= List of EastEnders: E20 episodes =

EastEnders: E20 is a British teen drama Internet soap opera, available on BBC Online, the official website of the BBC. The series is a spin-off from the long-running soap opera EastEnders and was created by Diederick Santer. It is set in Walford, a fictional borough of London, and follows the stories of teenagers who arrive in an attempt to escape from various problems. To date, there are three series available. The first episode of the first series was made available on 8 January 2010 and the first series ran for 12 episodes until 25 January. Each episode is between 3 and 16 minutes in length. The second series was made available from September 2010 and contains 10 episodes of 14 minutes each, following complaints from fans that some episodes in series one were too short. The third series, consisting of 15 episodes of around 10 minutes long, was originally available from 21 September until 21 October 2011. All three series are still available on the BBC website.

The first series follows the characters of Zsa Zsa Carter (Emer Kenny), Fatboy (Ricky Norwood), Mercy Olubunmi (Bunmi Mojekwu) and Leon Small (Sam Attwater), who meet in the first episode and decide to squat together in a flat at 89b George Street. The second follows Asher Levi (Heshima Thompson) and his brother Sol (Tosin Cole), Naz Mehmet (Emaa Hussen) and Stevie Dickinson (Amanda Fairbank-Hynes), who move into the flat above the beauty salon at 10 Turpin Road. The series 1 characters all make appearance in series 2, and Fatboy is a recurring character. The third series follows Donnie Lester (Samuell Benta), Ava Bourne (Sophie Colquhoun) and Mercy's sister Faith Olubunmi (Modupe Adeyeye), as well as brief appearances by Sol and Naz, and recurring appearances by Fatboy. Additionally, many EastEnders characters make cameo appearances throughout the three series.

Three omnibus editions of series one were available on BBC Red Button and BBC iPlayer for one week each in January 2010, and the episodes were edited into three 30-minute episodes for BBC Three, broadcast in April and May 2010. Five omnibus editions of series two were shown on BBC Three, and this continued for series 3. The first two series were written by a team of thirteen writers from London aged between 17 and 22 who responded to a writing competition and attended a summer school in August 2009 as part of the BBC's new talent initiative, where they created the entire first series. Different writers were brought in for series 3, including EastEnders actors Himesh Patel, Charlie G. Hawkins and Arinze Kene. John Yorke, along with Santer for series one, Bryan Kirkwood from series two and Sarah Miller from series 3, executively produces the series, and Deborah Sathe is producer. Michael Keillor directed the first two series, and John Howlett the third.

== Series overview ==
Series	Episodes	Originally released	
Series	Episodes	First released	Last released
1	12	8 January 2010	25 January 2010
2	10	7 September 2010	7 October 2010
3	15	21 September 2011	21 October 2011

== Series 1 ==
All episodes in series 1 were directed by Michael Keillor.

No. overall	No. in series	Title	Written by	Length	Character cameos	Original air date
1	1	"Episode 1"	Alex Oates	15m 40s	Zainab Masood, Lucy Beale, Lucas Johnson, Mo Harris, Masood Ahmed	8 January 2010
Zsa Zsa arrives in Albert Square on the run from her stepfather, Andy, who thinks she is inside 89b George Street. He leaves her belongings outside and waits for her. Leon is inside with Lucy Beale. He hears Andy shouting outside and when Lucy points out where Zsa Zsa is hiding, Leon defends Zsa Zsa, causing Lucy to leave. Mercy and Fatboy leave the community centre where Fatboy's attempts to encourage more young people to the church by setting up a website called godlypodly.co.uk has left them both humiliated. Zsa Zsa's clothes catch Fatboy's eye and he and Mercy take the bags. Andy catches up with Zsa Zsa but Leon fights him off her. Zsa Zsa runs off and Leon searches for her. He bumps into Fatboy and Mercy and persuades them to help look for Zsa Zsa. They find her but Andy's car comes round the corner and the four run to 89b George Street, which Zsa Zsa accesses with a key. Mercy then goes to the bathroom to take a pregnancy test. Leon tells Fatboy his alcoholic father has kicked him out of the house and Fatboy says his parents were killed in a drive-by shooting. The four then decide to stay in the flat.
2	2	"Episode 2"	Emer Kenny	11m 56s	Lucas Johnson, Heather Trott, George Trott, Lucy Beale, Jane Beale	9 January 2010
After spending their first night in the flat, Mercy has 12 unanswered phone calls from her grandmother. Worried that her grandmother will not fund her university place, she takes Fatboy to a bible class to help with ideas for the website, but he decides to leave when he sees Benjamin, the church's youth minister. Zsa Zsa wakes up and dumps Leon's things outside as she wants the flat to herself. She leaves the keys inside and gets locked out. Fatboy and Mercy return, and Fatboy sees Lucy and comes up with a plan. Mercy acts drunk in front of Lucy, and Leon asks for Lucy's help to get Mercy into the café. Lucy drops her bag and Fatboy takes the keys, throwing them to Zsa Zsa. On her way back to the flat, Zsa Zsa bumps into Heather Trott and recognises her baby George. In the café, Fatboy flirts with Jane Beale before Zsa Zsa returns Lucy's keys to her bag while she is in the toilet.
3	3	"Episode 3"	Florence Vincent	9m 37s	Heather Trott	11 January 2010
There is no food in the flat, so Mercy says everyone should put in £20. Zsa Zsa suggests anyone who does not make the money has to leave the flat. She goes to the launderette where Heather works, and steals her purse while she is in the back office. Fatboy tries to collect money, claiming it is for charity, but nobody will donate. He challenges Leon to strip in the launderette, which he does. Mercy meets Benjamin in the café and asks to borrow the money. Fatboy makes a call to someone and asks if they can lend him £40, and later gives half to Leon. After finding a photo of George in Heather's purse, Zsa Zsa returns the money. In the flat, she tells Leon she has not got the money, so he gives her his £20 and tells the others it looks like he is leaving. He then receives a call from his father and, worried he could be arrested for GBH, says he will think of something.
4	4	"Episode 4"	Kashman Harris	8m 23s	Ian Beale	13 January 2010
Leon's father, Malcolm, leaves the police station and calls his son but Leon ignores it as he has boxing practice. Mercy and Fatboy go the café to work on the website project, and then the chip shop where Fatboy accuses Ian Beale of racism because he does not serve the food they want. Malcolm turns up at Leon's practice and Leon asks him to leave but he says he will only go when Leon gives him his money back. Leon does not know about any money, but takes his father back to the flat. Leon picks up the jar of leftover money the gang collected, but refuses to give it to his father. Malcolm punches Leon in the stomach and takes the money. Zsa Zsa goes to see Leon at practice but finding him gone, returns to the flat where a man is waiting outside. Ian, the owner of the flat, brings the man inside. Leon and Zsa Zsa hide in a cupboard where they overhear Ian saying the man can move in next week. Ian moves a chair, putting it in front of the cupboard doors and trapping Leon and Zsa Zsa inside.
5	5	"Episode 5"	Abigail Pahnke	6m 41s	Shirley Carter, George Trott	14 January 2010
Fatboy pays Leon and Zsa Zsa to give him some time in the flat with Mercy. He asks Mercy to sit and talk but she says she has to go. Leon and Zsa Zsa go to an Indian restaurant and order the hottest thing on the menu. Mercy goes to a clinic to discuss abortion, while Fatboy cooks for her at home. On the way back from the restaurant, Zsa Zsa bumps into Shirley who tells her there is nothing for her in Walford. Leon gets a call saying that his father is in hospital and goes to see him. When Mercy gets home, Fatboy's meal is cold. He is angry as she promised to be there but then she tells him she is pregnant.
6	6	"Episode 6"	Muge Ahmet	4m 38s	Heather Trott, George Trott	16 January 2010
Heather asks Zsa Zsa to look after George. In the café, Fatboy asks Mercy who the father of her baby is. She gets annoyed with him and the laptop gets knocked onto the floor, breaking it. When Fatboy asks again who she slept with, Mercy walks out in anger and goes to the community centre to pray. Zsa Zsa asks Leon to help look after George and it brings them closer together. Heather collects George and Leon helps her with the pram, then comes back in and kisses Zsa Zsa.
7	7	"Episode 7"	Charlie George Weedon	6m 41s	Shirley Carter	17 January 2010
Mercy and Fatboy work on their project but he is still annoyed about the laptop breaking. Fatboy asks Mercy how she will pay for a child and says her parents will go crazy. They argue and she leaves. He runs after her to apologise. Leon visits Shirley who asks where Zsa Zsa is. He says she is visiting her father and Shirley reveals he is dead. Zsa Zsa is tidying her father's grave when Leon arrives and they flirt with each other, but then start talking and he says he visits his mother's grave. They kiss again, this time passionately, and have sex in the cemetery. Afterwards, Zsa Zsa says it was wrong and Leon says love makes people do funny things, but Zsa Zsa says it was just sex.
8	8	"Episode 8"	Matt Williamson	7m 22s	Tamwar Masood	20 January 2010
Mercy meets her grandmother in the community centre, who says Fatboy is a bad influence on her. Tamwar Masood offers to help Mercy with the website. Fatboy talks to Benjamin, saying Mercy is in trouble. Back at the flat, Fatboy and Mercy argue, and she leaves. Mercy goes to Tamwar for his help and Fatboy walks in thinking that Tamwar is her baby's father. Mercy walks out in tears, Leon comforts her and Fatboy sees them holding hands. Mercy then tells Benjamin she is expecting his baby.
9	9	"Episode 9"	Nicôle Lecky	6m 59s	Shirley Carter, Heather Trott, Patrick Trueman, Libby Fox	21 January 2010
Leon finds out his father has discharged himself from hospital. Fatboy says Mercy is "just another baby mama" and she says he should be more mature like Leon. Shirley pays Zsa Zsa to leave Walford. In the flat, Leon mentions that Mercy was the first girl he met in college, prompting Fatboy to leave. He convinces Patrick Trueman to sell him alcohol and then finds Zsa Zsa. He reveals he knows her father is dead and blurts out that Mercy is pregnant and Leon is the father. They go back to the flat where Leon is giving Mercy a boxing lesson and Zsa Zsa believes what Fatboy has told her.
10	10	"Episode 10"	Dionne Farrell	3m 59s	None	22 January 2010
Zsa Zsa starts throwing Leon and Mercy's belongings out the window and reveals that Fatboy told her that Mercy is pregnant by Leon, but Leon knows nothing about it. Mercy is collecting her things from outside when Benjamin arrives to talk but she sends him away. Fatboy is upset with Zsa Zsa for talking and he apologises to Mercy. Zsa Zsa says Fatboy is doing well for someone whose parents are dead and Mercy reveals they are alive. Angry at Fatboy's lie, Zsa Zsa throws his laptop out of the window. Mercy then doubles over in pain and asks for Benjamin while Leon calls an ambulance. When Fatboy comes back to the flat with Benjamin, Mercy, Leon and Zsa Zsa are gone and he gets a call from Leon to say he is with Mercy.
11	11	"Episode 11"	Joyce Lee and Nadia Gasper	10m 22s	Shirley Carter	24 January 2010
Mercy, Zsa Zsa and Leon are in the hospital, where it is revealed Mercy had a miscarriage. Zsa Zsa suddenly leaves and when Fatboy and Benjamin arrive, Mercy asks to be left with Benjamin, so Leon and Fatboy go to look for Zsa Zsa. They find she has packed her bags and left the flat, so Leon continues to look. Benjamin tells Mercy it has worked out for the best, but then apologises and says not to worry about the website. Mercy returns to the flat where Fatboy looks after her. Zsa Zsa is on a bus when Leon forces it to stop. Zsa Zsa tells him to leave her alone after getting off the bus. Leon says he wants her to stay as he has feelings for her but she says she means nothing more to him than Lucy Beale does, and he uses people. He says if she comes to his boxing match, he will know how she really feels.
12	12	"Episode 12"	William Hunt	9m 35s	Shirley Carter, Ian Beale, Mo Harris	25 January 2010
Mercy and Fatboy watch Leon's fight, where Fatboy says he has arranged a party for their last day in the flat and advertised it on the Internet. He says he has to go and gives Mercy a flash drive with the completed website project on it. Zsa Zsa is at her father's grave but returns to Albert Square to find Leon. Mercy finds the flat full of people and Leon turns up and is upset that Zsa Zsa is not there and was not at the match. Zsa Zsa goes to the community centre where Coach Roberts tells her Leon has already left. Leon goes outside and Zsa Zsa finds him and he tells her he won the fight and they kiss. Mercy and Fatboy join them just before the police turn up to stop the party. Fatboy invites the other three to stay at his house so they walk off. They find a milk float, which Fatboy hotwires and Zsa Zsa, Leon and Fatboy drive it away, while Mercy says she is going home to her grandmother.

== Series 2 ==
All episodes in series 2 were directed by Michael Keillor.

No. overall	No. in series	Title	Written by	Length	Character cameos	Original release date	Prod. code
13	1	"Episode 1"	Emer Kenny	15m 34s	Billy Mitchell	7 September 2010	E471X
Stevie and her boyfriend Olly have sex in their Walford flat but he dumps her afterwards and leaves. Asher and Sol are made homeless and Asher sees Stevie crying in Albert Square. Naz argues with Fatboy about a fake ID he made for her, and a fight breaks out, ending with Leon punching Sol in the face. Stevie invites Asher back to hers and asks him to move in. Naz returns home but hears her father shouting so leaves. Asher, Sol and Fatboy attend a dance audition at the community centre, but Sol messes up and leaves, meeting Naz outside. Asher joins them and they return to Stevie's flat, who says she does not mind them all staying with her. Asher returns to the community centre and offers money for Sol to be put through, and Skolla accepts when Asher offers him a watch. Fatboy sees this, and Asher tells him he did not see it, threatening him with a knife, and revealing a stab wound on his abdomen. After Fatboy leaves, Asher bins the knife.
14	2	"Episode 2"	Muge Ahmet, Matt Williamson	12m 07s	Masood Ahmed	8 September 2010	E472R
Olly turns up at the flat demanding £1000 rent from Stevie by the next day and tells her she should not go to Araminta's party that night before leaving. Stevie has half the money, Asher puts in some and Naz says she will take care of the rest. Naz tells Stevie to go to the party to make Olly jealous so he will take her back. At the party, Asher poses as Stevie's boyfriend and several people ask Sol to supply them with drugs. Naz uses food items to make fake drugs and sells them. Stevie gets drunk and Asher dances with Araminta. Stevie meets Pippa and badmouths her last boyfriend, and Pippa introduces Olly to her as her new boyfriend. After Asher and Araminta have sex, she invites him to a club night later in the week and her boyfriend comes in. Stevie insults Pippa and Pippa pushes her over into the punch bowl. The people Naz gave fake drugs to demand their money back and Olly tells Stevie to go home. Sol gives the money Naz made to Olly and the four leave. Back in Walford, Masood offers his coat to a cold Stevie and Naz kisses Sol to avoid being seen by a taxi driver.
15	3	"Episode 3"	Charlie George Weedon	16m 06s	Jane Beale, Heather Trott, Zainab Masood, Patrick Trueman, Tamwar Masood	14 September 2010	E473K
A hungover Stevie feels humiliated from the night before and thinks her last chance of getting Olly back is ruined. Sol and Asher go to the community centre to practice dancing but a latin dance class arrives. Asher pretends to be the dance teacher but when the real dance teacher arrives, Asher and Sol run off with the money. Zainab finds them but tells them to keep the money. Stevie reveals she had an erotic dream about Masood, and finds a takeaway curry leaflet in his coat. Naz orders a curry hoping that Masood will deliver it but Tamwar does instead, and he finds Stevie waiting in bed. The taxi driver, Ekin, finds Naz and takes her home, where it is revealed she is to become his wife.
16	4	"Episode 4"	Kashman Harris	14m 24s	Masood Ahmed	16 September 2010	E474E
Asher wakes up in bed with a girl who leaves because the bed is too small. Asher asks Stevie to swap bedrooms with him as she has a double bed. Olly then arrives to take his furniture from the flat, saying his new place is unfurnished. Asher and Stevie then agree that the first person to buy a bed gets to sleep in that bedroom. Naz arrives and apologises for the incident with Tamwar, and tells Stevie to flirt her way into employment. Naz takes Stevie to Masood's stall, where her attempts to flirt all fail. Naz then shows Stevie how to flirt properly by practicing on Sol. Asher tries to find work on the local market but nobody will take him, so he steals some trainers from a van. Stevie goes back to Masood and the techniques work as he asks her to come back the next day. Sol practices dancing at the community centre and Naz watches him. Afterwards, they almost kiss but her phone rings, and they return to the flat to meet Stevie. Asher sells the trainers and buys a bed, but when Stevie sees it, she thanks Asher for getting her bed back, as it is the same one Olly took earlier. Sol and Naz almost kiss again but they are interrupted by the arrival of Ekin, who reveals he and Naz are engaged.
17	5	"Episode 5"	E20 writers team	13m 12s	Patrick Trueman, Tamwar Masood	21 September 2010	E475Y
Stevie retrieves a box from under her bed, and when Naz checks on her she sees a birthday card so decides to organise a dinner party. Sol and Asher attend callbacks for the dance crew, but Skolla tells Sol he is too slow and asks him to do the routine solo. Sol is put off by having an audience and leaves. Asher assures Skolla that Sol is a good dancer and then meets Ekin, telling him that Naz is already seeing someone. Naz finds Stevie sitting alone in the launderette while Asher tells Sol that the dance crew is their future. Naz reveals that her arranged marriage to Ekin is down to her father and she does not want to marry him. She takes Stevie back to the flat where the dinner party is set up. Stevie gets a short phonecall from her mother in Brazil, and Naz looks at the birthday card. It is from when she was thirteen and Stevie reveals it is the last card she got from her family. Naz says to forget her family as tonight they will celebrate properly. The food is ruined so Sol goes out to buy chips, but Ekin sees him and tells him to tell Asher that he is not Naz's boyfriend and he should stick to his own kind, leaving Sol thinking Asher and Naz are seeing each other.
18	6	"Episode 6"	Nicole Lecky	13m 43s	Charlie Slater, Masood Ahmed	23 September 2010	E476S
Sol returns but is off with everyone and he insults Naz. Naz and Asher leave and go clubbing, and Asher hides Naz's phone when Sol texts her an apology. They get drunk and after Naz finds drugs in the toilet, they end up having sex. Meanwhile, Stevie tries to persuade Sol to go out by breaking the television, however, the electricity in the flat goes off. As they try to fix it, they manage to cause a blackout of the entire neighbourhood. Naz then phones Sol and he and Stevie go to find her. Stevie meets Pippa in the club and they become friendly, and Sol finds a drunken Naz, who Asher has left on her own. He takes her home on the tube and apologises for his earlier behavior, but he will not kiss as she is drunk. He then explains that Ekin put images of Naz and Asher in his head. As they hug, she looks worried.
19	7	"Episode 7"	Dionne Farrell	12m 11s	Billy Mitchell	28 September 2010	E477L
Sol and Naz wake up having spent the night together. Sol leaves to go to dance rehearsals but sees Asher and Naz talking. Stevie wakes up in bed with Pippa and tries to hide the fact she is there from Asher. Olly bursts in saying he has to let the flat go as he wants his deposit back. Stevie asks for a day to find it for him. Back in the bedroom, Pippa hides when Naz comes in, but Naz sees her foot. Skolla is impressed with Sol's dancing, and Asher arrives late. Naz turns up to watch and Asher returns her necklace. Sol sees this and asks Naz what he gave her. Naz leaves but Sol follows, and she reveals the necklace, saying she made a mistake with Asher that meant nothing. She denies receiving a text message from Sol. Pippa writes Stevie a cheque to pay for the deposit, tells Stevie she is very sexy and asks her to call her, before leaving. Sol punches Asher in the face in the market, saying his brother has betrayed him. A fist fight breaks out, which is split up by the dance crew. Skolla then asks Sol and Asher not to return and reveals Asher bought Sol's place. Sol returns home but his neighbour tells him his mother was taken away.
20	8	"Episode 8"	E20 writers team	10m 54s	Whitney Dean, Jane Beale	30 September 2010	E478F
Olly barges into the flat and Stevie gives him the deposit but he says he has already given notice and they have to leave the next day. After Olly and Asher leave, Stevie pretends to swallow the key to the door so Sol and Naz cannot leave. Asher sells stolen trainers to Whitney, and ignores Sol's calls. Whitney later tells Asher the trainers are different sizes and demands her money back. Jane says he did the same to her step son and snatches his wallet, taking a wad of cash, but Asher snatches it back. Jane then tells two police officers he is a thief and they chase him. Asher hides and Fatboy tells him that things will catch up with him. Naz reveals she is going to Turkey to meet Ekin's family and Sol, still angry with her, says she can stay there. Stevie pretends she needs to use the toilet and leaves Sol and Naz alone. They almost kiss when Asher comes in drunk. Stevie emerges and Sol goes to leave, and Stevie drops the key. She explains she wanted Sol and Naz to work things out. Sol leaves in anger and Stevie tells Asher he should be more of a friend to his brother. Outside, the police officers stop Sol and ask him where Asher is.
21	9	"Episode 9"	Florence Vincent	15m 02s	Roxy Mitchell	5 October 2010	E479A
Stevie ignores Olly's calls and checks the flat for safety violations. Her landlady, Roxy, arrives and Stevie asks to stay as she has the deposit, and tells Roxy she will contact the council about the violations, so Roxy agrees to let her stay. She asks Olly to come to the flat, and she ties him naked to a chair. She then humiliates him by giving him just a dress to leave in. Asher finds Sol sitting with their mother in hospital, and tells him he is better with his brother than his schizophrenic mother. However, Sol says Asher is the problem. Asher then tells Sol that he deleted the text message he sent Naz and that she loves him and he should do something about it. Naz packs her backs at home to go to Turkey, but as her father comes to get her, he finds she has escaped through a window.
22	10	"Episode 10"	E20 writers team	12m 15s	Masood Ahmed, Jane Beale	7 October 2010	E480T
Naz returns to Walford and tells Stevie she is on the run from her family. Her father and Ekin race into Walford while Stevie phones Asher, who is with Sol and their mother, to tell them to come to the flat as it could be Sol's last chance. Stevie lets Naz's father into the flat and he takes her out to the car and Stevie tells Naz she will save her. Asher and Sol arrive, and Asher asks Marlon if Sol can dance at the dance-off. Sol stops Ekin's car and Naz gets out and kisses Sol. Stevie tells Masood one day they will have tea before kissing him and leaving. Asher tells Sol he can dance. After Skolla's crew dances, Sol performs a solo routine and everyone cheers at how good he is. As they watch the dancing, Naz and her father hug. After Flawless perform a routine, Stevie says she loves a happy ending.

== Series 3 ==
All episodes in series 3 were directed by John Howlett.

No. overall	No. in series	Title	Written by	Length	Character cameos	Original release date
23	1	"Episode 1"	Corey Montague-Sholay	11m 27s	Jack Branning, Dot Branning	21 September 2011
Faith is kicked out by her grandmother, Grace. Donnie and Ava, on their way to stay in care, are involved in a car accident. They arrive in Walford, where Donnie decides to start squatting at 3 Albert Square. Faith follows, and the three start living together. Ava has a bag belonging to someone named Olivia, but threatens Faith when she asks about it.
24	2	"Episode 2"	Charlie G. Hawkins and Himesh Patel	10m 1s	Janine Malloy, Kim Fox	22 September 2011
Faith, Donnie and Ava attempt to feed themselves by stealing from local business. They see a newspaper saying two people have gone missing following a car crash.
25	3	"Episode 3"	Emer Kenny	7m 19s	Janine Malloy	23 September 2011
When Janine finds the gang hiding in the property, they lie that they are volunteers for a charity, and they are forced to make their lie true. However, Janine realises they are lying and threatens them with the police. Donnie receives a phone call from a woman saying the police are asking questions.
26	4	"Episode 4"	Wemmy Ogunyankin	9m 46s	Janine Malloy	27 September 2011
Faith has sex with Fatboy in order to get a shower. Donnie gets his leg wound seen to at the hospital and reveals to Ava that it was his sister, Riley, who phoned him and is in care. A nurse becomes suspicious about Ava and Donnie's identities and calls the police, and they flee, but are arrested on their return home.
27	5	"Episode 5"	Laura Turner	10m 52s	None	29 September 2011
Donnie and Ava are released from the police station without charge. Faith is placed in emergency care by her grandmother, and the three discover their squat is to become their hostel. Their keyworker, Richard, takes a liking to Ava. Riley arrives to see Donnie but Richard turns her away. Donnie threatens Richard when he finds out.
28	6	"Episode 6"	Alex Oates	11m 5s	Zainab Masood	30 September 2011
Zainab complains about the hostel being in her community. Richard gives the gang life books to fill out, which they do not do. Ava meets Riley, who has cuts on her arm. She says she is being bullied in her care home, and wants to be adopted by Donnie. Richard informs Donnie that Ava and Riley have spoken, leading to Donnie becoming angry and causing mayhem across the neighbourhood with Faith.
29	7	"Episode 7"	Sandra Townsend	12m 14s	Zainab Masood, Jack Branning	4 October 2011
Ava realises Donnie and Faith have had sex. Zainab discovers the Square has been vandalised and takes photos, showing them to Richard. Richard forces Donnie, Faith and Ava to clean up the mess. Donnie's illiteracy is revealed. Ava confides in Richard, and kisses him after misreading a sign. However, Richard kisses her back.
30	8	"Episode 8"	Florence Vincent	11m 12s	Phil Mitchell, Anthony Moon, Zainab Masood	6 October 2011
Richard destroys CCTV footage of him and Ava together, and tells her he is disappointed in her behaviour. The trio are forced to clean The Queen Victoria pub for Phil. Riley is taunted by her bully, Talia.
31	9	"Episode 9"	Tosin Badmus	8m 57s	Zainab Masood, Tamwar Masood	7 October 2011
The gang work at the local Indian restaurant, where Ava says she can help Donnie learn to read. Faith overhears this and Donnie is humiliated. Faith offers to help and Donnie accepts. Richard gets a call from the local newspaper, and Faith comments that Ava is Richard's favourite, leading to a fight.
32	10	"Episode 10"	Nessah Muthy	11m 10s	Zainab Masood	11 October 2011
A journalist arrives to report on the trio helping the community. Donnie rejects Faith when she flirts with him, and Fatboy also rejects her. Faith searches the internet for "Olivia Bryan", discovering that Ava was involved in an arson attack when she was younger. Ava invites Richard into her room and they kiss. She tells him to stop but he rapes her.
33	11	"Episode 11"	Arinze Kene	10m 29s	Zainab Masood	13 October 2011
Donnie realises something has happened between Ava and Richard, but Richard gives Donnie a letter of recommendation from Social Services in order to silence him. Faith calls the newspaper to tell them about Olivia Bryan. Ava confides in Faith about the rape, and Donnie overhears this.
34	12	"Episode 12"	Senem Boyaci	10m 59s	None	14 October 2011
Donnie punches Richard, and Richard is arrested. Ava is also taken for questioning. Journalists arrive but Faith tells them she lied and there is no Olivia living there. She ends up soaking their new keyworker, Theresa. Ava tells Donnie about her past.
35	13	"Episode 13"	E20 team	7m 39s	Dot Branning	18 October 2011
The press camp outside the carehome continue to hound Ava. Faith distracts the press by wearing a bikini and confronting them on her door step, whilst Donnie and Ava seek out another entrance. Faith performs a solo at the community centre and Riley asks Donnie for help.
36	14	"Episode 14"	E20 team	8m 37s	None	20 October 2011
Riley confess to Donnie that she has been bullied and that they stole her mobile phone, Riley goes missing. The bullies catch up with Riley but kick Donnie to the ground and Riley stabs the leader with a knife.
37	15	"Episode 15"	Meral Duzgun and Evan Parker	8m 52s	None	21 October 2011
The gang, Donnie, Ava and Riley run from the scene of the knife attack. Donnie, Ava and Riley hideout in the park. Donnie confess to the stabbing and he is arrested for grievous bodily harm.
