= BBC Writers Academy =

Training scheme for writers by BBC Studios

BBC Studios Writers’ Academy is a training scheme for writers of television drama. The course was originally run by the British Broadcasting Corporation from 2005 to 2013. It relaunched under the banner of BBC Studios in 2019.

== About the course ==
The Writers’ Academy offers each cohort of writers a year's paid training, which includes lectures and input from a range of leading industry practitioners. The writers receive commissions on the BBC's flagship continuing drama shows and are also given the opportunity to develop an original project with BBC Studios or one of their independent production partners.

The Writers' Academy is led by John Yorke.

== Alumni ==
As of 2021, the Writers' Academy has had 10 cohorts of writers. Participants are commissioned to write episodes for BBC's flagship Continuing Drama shows. These have included EastEnders, Casualty, Holby City, Doctors and River City.

In addition to their Continuing Drama commissions, Writers’ Academy alumni have written the following:

=== 2005 ===
- Rachel Flowerday: Co-creator of The Moonstone and Malory Towers with Sasha Hails. Co-creator of Father Brown with Tahsin Güner. Credits on The Sanctuary, Marcella, The Last Czars.
- Sasha Hails: Co-creator of The Moonstone & Malory Towers with Rachel Flowerday. Casualty lead writer 2007- 2014. Credits on Versailles, Beowulf: Return to the Shieldlands, Tarsas Jatek. Wizards vs. Aliens. Waterloo Road. Additional material on The Crown.
- Dana Fainaru: Lead writer and core writer Casualty & Holby City. Death in Paradise, The Last Czars.
- Joy Wilkinson: Core Writer for Doctors. Credits on Land Girls, Nick Nickleby and Dr Who. Screen International Star of Tomorrow and two-time Brit List nominee. Theatre includes The Sweet Science of Bruising (Southwark Playhouse), Acting Leader (Tricycle Theatre) and Fair (Finborough Theatre and Trafalgar Studios, West End).
- Mark Catley: Lead writer Casualty & EastEnders. Co-creator of Eggbox. Credits on Call The Midwife, The Interceptor, Youngers.
- Matt Evans: Lead writer EastEnders. Co-creator of Phoenix Rise and 6 Degrees. Credits on Riviera, Our Girl, New Tricks, Law & Order UK, Stella, Wild at Heart, Grange Hill, The Dumping Ground and The Worst Witch.
- Bradley Quirk: Executive producer Horrible Histories the Movie. Head of Development The Girl with All the Gifts.
- Chris Boiling: Doctors regular writer. Wine journalist.

=== 2006 ===
- Mark Clompus: Core writer Doctors & EastEnders. Credits on Missing.
- Daisy Coulam: Creator of Grantchester and Deadwater Fell. Credits on Humans and Death in Paradise.
- Ian Kershaw: Credits on EastEnders, Coronation Street, Cold Feet, The Dumping Ground, Death in Paradise, Shameless.
- Stephen Keyworth: Core writer Doctors, EastEnders and Casualty. Credits on animation Monkey & Gorilla. Playwright and radio dramatist.
- Al Smith: Co-creator of The Cut with Geoffrey Goodwin. Credits on Africa, The Coroner, Father Brown. Prolific playwright for theatre and radio. Recent theatre credits include Radio (Arcola Theatre), Harrogate (The Royal Court) and The Astronaut Wives Club (Soho Theatre). Recent radio drama credits include Life Lines and First Do No Harm (both BBC Radio 4).
- Jeff Young: Playwright and radio dramatist. Credits on Stepping Up. Author of the Costa Biography Prize Shortlisted book Ghost Town. Over 25 radio plays broadcast in the last two decades. Written plays for Liverpool Everyman, Kneehigh and Bristol Old Vic.
- Abi Brown: Credits on Stepping Up.
- Paul Jenkins: Theatre director. Play credits include These Trees are Made of Blood at the Southwark Playhouse.

=== 2007 ===
- Abby Ajayi: Credits on Coming Up, Hollyoaks, Hetty Feather, How to Get Away With Murder, Four Weddings & A Funeral. Currently writing Riches for ITV.
- Justin Young: Executive producer and showrunner Holby City. Credits on Ripper Street, Dickensian, Death in Paradise, Sanditon. Announced as lead writer Sanditon series 2 and 3.
- Samina Baig
- Paul Campbell: Core writer Doctors. Credits on The Dumping Ground.
- Fiona Evans: Playwright and Radio dramatist. Credits on Hollyoaks. Play credits include Scarborough and Geoff Dead: Disco for Sale. Radio credits include The Startling Truths of Old World Sparrows (BBC Radio 3) which won the Grand Prix Nova International Radio Drama Festival silver award.
- Karen Laws: Creator of 32 Brinkburn Street. Credits on Shameless, Waterloo Road, Hollyoaks. Radio credits include The Archers.
- Michael Levine: Core writer Casualty.
- Philip Gawthorne Writer Modern Life is Rubbish. Contributor to Underwater.

=== 2008 ===
- Tom Bidwell: Creator of The Irregulars, Watership Down, My Mad Fat Diary and Katy. Co-creator of Eggbox with Mark Catley.
- Sally Abbott: Creator of The Coroner. Credits on Death in Paradise and Vera.
- Rob Williams: Creator of The Victim and Chasing Shadows. Credits on DCI Banks, The Man in the High Castle and Killing Eve. Nominated BAFTA Mini Series and Scottish BAFTA Best Scripted for The Victim. Forthcoming original sres Channel 4 series Screw and showrunner of Apple TV+ thriller Suspicion.
- Sonali Bhattacharyya: Playwright and radio dramatist. Theatre credits include Two Billion Beats (Orange Tree Theatre), Megaball (National Theatre Learning), 2066 (Almeida Theatre), The Invisible Boy (Kiln Theatre) and the South Bank Show award nominated White Open Spaces (Pentabus Theatre). Radio credits include core writer on Silver Street.
- Rebecca Wojciechowski: Core writer EastEnders and Casualty. Credits on Death in Paradise and Father Brown.
- Gill Adams: Fringe First Award Winner. Part of Meet the Richardsons. Started the Hull Blokes playwriting group.
- Paul Mari: Regular writer EastEnders.
- Amanda Smith.

=== 2009 ===
- Kim Revill: Lea writer EastEnders. Lead writer and executive producer on Red Rock. Credits on Ackley Bridge.
- Tahsin Güner: Co-creator of Father Brown with Rachel Flowerday. Co-creator of Killed by my Debt (Winner of BAFTA Best Single Film). Credits on Lewis and New Tricks.
- Tim Price: Credits on Unprecedented, How to Fake a War, The Smoke, The New Worst Witch, Switch, Secret Diary of a Call Girl and Y Pris.
- Lauren Klee: Core writer on EastEnders. Credits on Call The Midwife, Red Water, Tina & Bobby, Waterloo Road.
- Nicola Wilson: Credits on Father Brown, Shakespeare & Hathaway, The Good Karma Hospital.
- Simon Vinnicombe: Playwright.
- Stacey Gregg: Credits on Little Birds, Here Before, The Letter for the King, The Innocents, Riviera, The Frankenstein Chronicles, Coming Up, Raw.
- Shazia Rashid:

=== 2010 ===
- Matthew Barry: Core writer on Casualty, Credits on Chilling Adventures of Sabrina, Stella, Redwater, Death in Paradise, Banana, Waterloo Road.
- Matthew Broughton: Credits on Manson, My Spy Family, Critical. Playwright and radio dramatist. Recent credits include Tracks andVincent Price and the Horror of the English Blood Beast (BBC Radio 4).
- Patrick Homes: Core writer on Holby City. Credits on The Bill.
- Peter McKenna: Creator and showrunner of Red Rock. Credits on The Musketeers, The Living and the Dead, The Last Kingdom, The Gloaming, Frankie. Forthcoming RTÉ and Acorn TV show Hidden Assets.
- Fiona Peek: Credits on Red Rock.
- Paul Matthew Thompson: Creator of Shakespeare & Hathaway. Writer and producer on forthcoming Imperial Spy. Credits on Vera, Father Brown, Land Girls.
- Andrea Page
- Natasha Langridge: Playwright

=== 2011 ===
- Christian O’Reilly: Credits on Red Rock, Deception, Ros na Run.
- Katie Douglas: Core writer on EastEnders and Holby City. Credits on Dani's Castle, Waterloo Road, The Revolting World of Stanley Brown, Sadie J, After You've Gone. Playwright.
- Emer Kenny: Actor and writer. Creator BBC series pilot Ladybaby. Credits on Red Rock, Save Me, EastEnders E20 and Harlots. Forthcoming series adaptation of Val McDermid's novel Karen Pirie.
- Kenneth Emson: Co-creator The Last Hours of Laura K.
- Kirstie Swain: Creator of Pure. Credits on Run, Clique and Eve.
- Steph Lloyd Jones: Credits on Red Rock, River City.
- Ben Tagoe: Credits on In the Long Run, Stan Lee's Lucky Man, Jamie Johnson. Core writer on Coronation Street.
- Rosalind O Shaughnessy: Medical adviser for 60+ Casualty episodes.

=== 2012 ===
- Robert Goldsbrough: Winner of the Sir Peter Ustinov Television Scriptwriting Award at the International Emmys for his debut script The Forge.
- Lucia Haynes: credits on River City, Annika Standed and JoJo & Gran Gran.
- Catherine Johnson Author and screenwriter. Writer of Bulletboy. Forthcoming series inspired by Miranda Kaufmann's book Black Tudors: The Untold Story.
- Kit Lambert: Credits on Father Brown, The Coroner and Shakespeare & Hathaway.
- Natalie Mitchell: Core writer on EastEnders. Credits on Ackley Bridge. Playwright.
- Janice Okoh: Credits on Hetty Feather and Channel 4 anthology series On the Edge. Playwright and radio dramatist. Radio plays include adaptations of Malorie Blackman's Noughts & Crosses and Kate Chopin's The Awakening.
- Laura Poliakoff: Regular EastEnders writer.
- Mark Stevenson: Core writer Casualty and EastEnders. Credits on Waterloo Road, River City and Eve.

=== 2019 ===
- Jess Green
- Katerina Watson
- Emma Dennis-Edwards
- Rebekah Harrison
- Lydia Marchant
- Jennie Davis
- Tom Powell
- Kellie Smith

=== 2021 ===
- Berri George: Credits on Coronation Street.
- Mahad Ali
- Daniel Nixon
- Orla Hannon
- Charlotte Cromie
- Jamie Davis: Forthcoming ITV drama You and Me.
- Gareth Farr
- John Servante: Credits on Channel 4's anthology series On The Edge.
