= Levi David Addai =

British playwright and screenwriter

- Born: South London, England
- Education: Brunel University
- Occupations: Screenwriter, playwright
- Notable work: Damilola, Our Loved Boy; Youngers; Dark Mon£y; Oxford Street; House of Agnes; 93.2FM
- Awards: Alfred Fagon Award (2011)

Levi David Addai is a British screenwriter and playwright. He is best known for the award-winning Damilola, Our Loved Boy, the critically acclaimed Youngers and his stage plays 93.2FM, House of Agnes and Oxford Street.

== Personal ==
Addai was born in South London to Ghanaian parents. He studied at Brunel University.

== Plays ==
Addai wrote his first play, 93.2FM, as part of the Royal Court Young Writers Programme. It was performed at Royal Court Theatre in 2005, and then revived in 2006 before touring to Cardiff, Birmingham, Liverpool and Brighton. In a Times review it was said that "There is an enormous generosity in Addai's writing. He shows us the caring, supportive side of community.. this is a memorable and decidedly promising debut." 93.2FM starred Richie_Campbell_(actor), Sharon Duncan Brewster, Lenora Crichlow, Javone Prince and Ashley Madekwe.

Addai's second play, House of Agnes, premiered in March 2008 at the Ovalhouse in a co-production with Paines Plough. A review in the Financial Times said "Addai writes his characters' most heartfelt emotions with the clarity and sincerity of a younger Richard Cameron." House of Agnes starred Cecilia Noble and Adam Deacon.

Addai's third play, Oxford Street, starring Ashley Walters and Daniel Kaluuya 'premiered at the Royal Court in May 2008, before transferring for a limited run in Elephant and Castle shopping centre. The Times in a review said "All the tawdry dazzle of London's most famous shopping district glitters in the third play by the sharp-eyed young talent Levi David Addai... This is a joyous hymn to our flawed, fabulous city." Oxford Street was nominated for a Writers' Guild award in the "Best Play (Theatre)" category (2008); and was nominated for the "Outstanding Achievement in an Affiliate Theatre" category of the Olivier Award (2009). Oxford Street also starred Nathaniel Martello-White, Cyril Nri, Preeya Kalidas, Shane Zaza and Kristian Kiehling.

His play for Polka Theatre, I Have A Dream, ran in September 2011, starring Troy Glasgow. A new play, Blacklands, won the Alfred Fagon Award (2011).

== Television ==
In 2011, Addai wrote a short film, Micah, starring Daniel Kaluuya for the Channel 4 series Coming Up which highlights films made for television by new directors and writers. It was broadcast in August and screened at the Edinburgh Film Festival. The short led to his winning "Best Breakthrough Talent" at the CDN Diversity Awards (2011). Micah also starred Cecilia Noble and David Ajala.

BBC Current Affairs commissioned Levi to write the drama My Murder starring John Boyega, based on a gang-related honey trap murder which premiered on BBC3 on 26 March 2012. My Murder won a Broadcast Awards (2013) in the "Best Single Drama" category; it won "Best Drama" at the Movie Video & Screen Awards (2012); it received a recognition at the 2012 Screen Nation Film and TV Awards for "Diversity in Drama Production"; and was nominated for "Best Single Drama" at the 2013 Royal Television Society awards. My Murder also starred Malachi Kirby and Franz Drameh.

Addai was lead writer, co-creator and associate producer of Youngers, an E4 critically acclaimed drama series, which was first broadcast on Channel 4 on 20 March 2013, and ran for two series. The Guardian in a review said, "Youngers has heart, conviction and a spring in its trainers so pneumatic it's surely only a matter of time before it crunks itself clean through the ceiling tiles". It was nominated for a Screen Nation Film and Television Awards for Diversity in Drama Production (2014), a Broadcast Award for Best Multichannel Programme (2014), and a BBC Radio 1 Teen Award for Best British TV show (2013). Youngers starred Calvin Demba, Arinze Kene, Samson Kayo, Joivan Wade, Percelle Ascott, Little Simz, Daisy Ridley, Curtis Walker, Danielle Vitalis, Ria Zmitrowicz and Ricky Champ.

Addai's 90-minute BBC One drama Damilola, Our Loved Boy, starring Babou Ceesay and Wunmi Mosaku, tells the story of Damilola Taylor from the point of view of the Taylor family. It won the Best Single Drama BAFTA TV Award and the Screen Nation Film and Television Award for Diversity in Drama Production. Other wins include the Banff Rockie Best Television Movie Award, the CDN Best Drama Award and the CDN Best Author/Creative Award. It was nominated for a BAFTA TV Award for Best Writer, a Broadcasting Press Guild Award for Best Single Drama, and the Banff Rockie Special Jury Prize. It has won at the inaugural Diversity Awards and at the Movie, Video & Screen Awards. Other nominations include best single drama for the Broadcast Awards 2018 and the RTS Awards 2018. Damilola, Our Loved Boy also starred Naomi Ackie, Robert Pugh and Ben Bailey Smith.

In 2016, the BBC announced they were producing an adaptation of acclaimed YA novels Noughts and Crosses, to be written by Addai, with Matthew Graham. They had to bow out and Toby Whithouse took over in 2018.

Addai's four-part serial Dark Mon£y, starring Babou Ceesay and Jill Halfpenny, was first broadcast between 8 and 16 July 2019 on BBC One and on Netflix in 2022. It deals with the ordeal of a family of a sexual abuse victim. Dark Mon£y also starred Max Fincham, Susan Wokoma, Tut Nyuot, Ellen Thomas, Rebecca Front and Arnold Oceng.

Addai wrote episode four and co-wrote (with Dennis Kelly) episode three of the critically acclaimed drama Waiting for the Out, broadcast in January 2026 on BBC One.
