= Hull Comedy Festival =

Annual event in Kingston upon Hull, England

The Hull Comedy Festival is an annual event that takes place in Kingston upon Hull, England.

== Background ==
The Hull Comedy Festival was established in 2006, when a local businessman John Gilbert received funding from Hull Business Improvement District to develop a sustainable event that would benefit the evening economy. John Gilbert handed over the reins of Hull Comedy Festival in 2013 to C69 Comedy (RTCE Productions).

However, in 2015, John Gilbert resumed the role as the director of Hull Comedy Festival with the support of a team of volunteers.

== 2007 ==
The festival ran from 26 October to 9 November and featured over seventy performers at over forty events. John Gilbert launches Hull Comedy Festival and assembled a team of sponsors and volunteers.

Performers included Russell Howard, Stewart Lee, Justin Moorhouse, Lucy Porter, Trevor Lock, Frank Sidebottom, John Shuttleworth and Ivan Brackenbury. These were a varied range of famous, local, and touring acts.

The Hull Blokes, The Live Naked Idiots (including comedy magician Alan Hudson), Masked Dan, Andy Train and Scarlet Lights Theatre Company are amongst the local performers who also appeared.

Participating venues in 2007 included: Hull Truck Theatre, The Quality Royal Hotel, The Lamp, The New Clarence, Northern Academy of Performing Arts, Tiger's Lair, Pave, The Octagon, The Freedom Centre, Durty Nelly’s, The Dorchester Hotel, Punchbowl, The Piper, Cineworld and the University of Hull. Street comedy performances were also scheduled to take place at Queen Victoria Square and St Stephen's in the city centre.

A festival taster, was also featured on ITV.

== 2008 ==
The festival ran from 23 October to 7 November. This year, Hull Comedy Festival became East Yorkshire's largest ticket festival, with a 400% increase in sales, it led to over 12,000 tickets being sold.

Paddy McGuinness, Frankie Boyle, Pete Firman, Russell Howard, Jason Manford, Keith Chegwin and Russell Kane performed at what was billed "the difficult second festival". Whilst local acts created Green Helmet Day and Festival anthems.

It was delivered in partnership by Hull City Centre BID, eskimosoup, Hull Colour Pages and St. Stephens with the support of over a dozen local companies and organisations.

== 2009 ==
The festival ran from 23 October to 7 November, organised by eskimosoup in partnership with Hull Business Improvement District, KCFM 99.8 and Hull Colour Pages.

Performers included Alistair McGowan, Al Murray, Rich Hall and Keith Chegwin. Shows included stage comedy Little Shop of Horrors and an adaptation of the TV sitcom, Porridge starring Shaun Williamson.

Festival Director John Gilbert hailed the festival the "most satisfying yet" due to high audience figures throughout the programme as well as several successful community projects.

The Festival hosted multiple community projects, that were aimed at improving health and boosting confidence.

== 2010 ==
The 2010 festival took place between 21 October and 7 November and was again organised by eskimosoup with Jon Reed as creative director.

Performers included Sarah Millican, Milton Jones, Ross Noble, Mark Watson, Joe Pasquale, Greg Davies and Phil Cool.

Organisers claim that 5,388 tickets of a target of 5,600 were sold and that the festival had become a commercial success as well as an annual highlight for the creative community.

In the 2010 the festival was voted Hull's second favourite festival by users of Karoo.co.uk and was short listed in the Visit Hull and East Yorkshire Remarkable Tourism Awards].

A week of events at the I-Scream creates a festival venue to big success. John Gilbert hands the festival over to a successor.

== 2011 ==
The festival ran from 21 October to 21 November under the new direction of Rich Quelch, who took over as festival director with assistance from creative consultants C69 Comedy (RTCE Productions) Performers included Tim Minchin, Tommy Tiernan, Andy Parsons, Paul Zerdin, Joe Pasquale, Lee Hurst and Jerry Sadowitz, however there where other acts also.

== 2012 ==
The Festival ran from 20 October 2012 to 23 November 2012.

This year's Comedy Festival included, Performers Al Murray, Rhod Gilbert, Frankie Boyle, Hairy Bikers, Stewart Francis, Kevin Bridges, Vikki Stone and Ross Noble.

There were over 10,000 tickets sold, and thousands of pounds were raised for charity.

== 2013 ==
This year the festival returned with a fresh new face now under the direction of C69 Comedy (RTCE Productions).

It ran from 1 to 17 November 2013 with performers including Jack Dee, Alan Davies, Josh Widdicombe, Jonny & The Baptists, Tony Law and Sean Lock to name but a few.

This is also the first year of the festival's Funny and Free Fringe bringing 18 free shows.

== 2014 ==
This year Hull Comedy Festival was scaled back, as the lead promoter cancels many of the shows.

Jon Richardson and Lucy Beaumont are amongst some of the remaining performances.

Local acts and fans rallied together to help save the festival and aim to bring it back stronger.

== 2015 ==
This year, the Festival founder John Gilbert took back his role as the director and was supported by a team of volunteers.

It took place from 1 to 15 November.

Acts such as Alan Carr, Bill Bailey, Dara Ó Briain, Horrible Histories, Alfie Moore, and Joe Lycett, were scheduled to perform.

== Tenfootcity Comedian of the Year ==
This competition started in 2007, and forms part of the festival. There is a cash prize and trophy awarded to the winner.

=== Winners ===
- 2017: 1st Friz Frizzle
- 2013: 1st Tom Taylor
- 2012: 1st Hayley Ellis
- 2011: 1st Jay Hampson
- 2010: 1st Sam Brady
- 2009: 1st Gareth Urwin, 2nd Andrew Ryan
- 2008: 1st Sam Gore, 2nd Ben Harland
- 2007: 1st Mick Sergeant
