= Dark Money (TV series) =

- Official Poster
- Genre: Drama
- Written by: Levi David Addai
- Directed by: Lewis Arnold
- Starring: Babou Ceesay; Jill Halfpenny; Rudi Dharmalingam; Max Fincham
- Composer: Sarah Warne
- Country of origin: United Kingdom
- Original language: English
- No. of series: 1
- No. of episodes: 4

Production
- Executive producers: Levi David Addai; George Faber; Mark Pybus; Lucy Richer
- Producer: Erika Hossington
- Production location: United Kingdom
- Cinematography: Mark Wolf
- Production companies: The Forge; BBC

Original release
- Network: BBC One
- Release: 8 July – 16 July 2019

Dark Money (stylized Dark Mon£y) is a 2019 British drama miniseries written by Levi David Addai. The drama deals with the sexual abuse of a minor by a film producer, and the challenges his family faces thereafter when they receive hush money to keep silent. The series was screened in the United States in 2020 by BET+. In 2023, the series was adapted into the Indian Hindi-language series Kafas.

== Plot ==
The family of a sexually abused child accepts hush money from a famous filmmaker to remain silent.

== Production ==
Screenwriter Levi David Addai was inspired to write the miniseries when he was sitting in his car on a Saturday morning, people-watching and waiting for his daughter to finish her drama lesson. He found it interesting that the parents who were offering up their children, and absorbing all the hopes and dreams of what the course leaders and the academy leaders were selling were so trusting of the virtual strangers.

== Cast ==
- Babou Ceesay as Manny Mensah
- Jill Halfpenny as Sam Mensah
- Olive Gray as Jess Mensah
- Max Fincham as Isaac Mensah
- Ellen Thomas as Maggie Mensah
- Susie Wokoma as Sabrina Stevens
- Tut Nyuot as Tyrone Stevens-Mensah
- Rudi Dharmalingam as Dominic Nadesan
- Rebecca Front as Cheryl Denon
- John Schwab as Jotham Starr
- Joseph May as Brett Huntley
- Arnold Oceng as Ryan Osei
- Lin Blakley as Avril Allen
- Henry Garrett as Mitch Colney

== Episodes ==
No.	Title	Directed by	Written by	Original release date
1	"Shattered Dreams"	Lewis Arnold	Levi David Addai	8 July 2019
A London family face a dilemma after their 13-year-old son Isaac is molested by a Hollywood film producer while filming in the U.S. Unable to pursue the perpetrator through the UK courts they accept a substantial pay-off to keep quiet.
2	"Valiant & Son"	Lewis Arnold	Levi David Addai	9 July 2019
As the day of the film premiere approaches and young Isaac is forced to come face to face with his abuser, will Manny finally act when he is confronted by his son's despair?
3	"All That Glitters..."	Lewis Arnold	Levi David Addai	15 July 2019
As it comes under increasing pressure the Mensah family begins to fracture, Isaac spirals out of control and as the truth starts to come out Jess plays a dangerous game with the press.
4	"The Valiant One"	Lewis Arnold	Levi David Addai	16 July 2019
With Isaac in hospital, Manny and Sam are threatened by Jotham's lawyer. Mother and father both decide to seek justice for their son - but in very different ways.

== Critical reception ==
The Independent gave it four stars, stating that it 'speaks eloquently about the abuse of children by the powerful, how persistent the phenomenon is and how uneven the balance of power between abuser and abused is – and will probably always be, given that so much of it is about money.' The Guardian gave it three stars and called it 'slight', stating that the subject matter was powerful, but its characters were 'not yet fine-grained enough for us to feel their personal agony and loss. Also, the question of what we would do in their situation is too far removed from likelihood to be a compelling draw.'
