= Emer Kenny =

British actress and screenwriter

- Born: London, England
- Occupations: Actress; screenwriter
- Years active: 2007–present
- Spouse: Rick Edwards (m. 2016)
- Children: 1

Emer Kenny is a British actress and screenwriter. She is best known for playing Zsa Zsa Carter in EastEnders and its spin-off EastEnders: E20, Danielle Reeves in Pramface and Penelope "Bunty" Windermere in Father Brown. Kenny also provides a motion capture and voice to Callie Mayer in the Formula One story mode video game, Braking Point.

== Career ==
Kenny made her professional debut in the 2007 BBC television drama Coming Down the Mountain, and, in 2009, she made her film debut in Phil Claydon's Lesbian Vampire Killers. She played the role of Kate in an improvisational BBC production called Freefall written and directed by Dominic Savage, which was screened in 2009. In January 2010, Kenny began her role in the EastEnders spin-off EastEnders: E20 as Zsa Zsa Carter as well as in EastEnders itself. Kenny was cast in the role of Zsa Zsa after writing the second episode of EastEnders: E20. A second series of EastEnders: E20 was announced in April 2010, with Kenny returning as a writer, although it was announced the following month that Zsa Zsa would be written out of EastEnders so Kenny could pursue further acting roles. She made her last appearance on 30 September 2010.

In 2010, Kenny was painted by Rolf Harris as Titania from Shakespeare's A Midsummer Night's Dream for an edition of BBC TV's Arena ("Rolf Harris Paints His Dream").

Kenny wrote a further episode of EastEnders: E20 for series three in 2011 and was selected as the youngest ever writer for the BBC Writers Academy where she trained to write for programmes such as EastEnders, Casualty, Holby City, and Doctors. Her first EastEnders episode as a writer was broadcast on 8 May 2012.

She joined the cast of E4's Beaver Falls for its second series playing the character Hope. The second series began airing in early August 2012 with the final episode of the series airing in early September 2012. It was announced on 22 September 2012 that the drama would not be recommissioned.

In 2011, she was cast as Danielle Reeves in the BBC Three dramedy Pramface alongside her Beaver Falls co-star Scarlett Alice Johnson. Pramface piloted in late February 2012 and was met with good reception, so much so the second series was commissioned by the BBC before the first series had even aired. She reprised her role for the second series which began airing in the new year of 2013 and was broadcast a second time on BBC One throughout the summer of 2013. She reprised her role again for a third series which commenced airing in late February 2014.

She played the role of Rachel alongside Matthew Crosby, Ben Clark and Tom Parry in the first series of BBC Three's sitcom Badults which aired in the summer of 2013. A second series was commissioned but it was announced that Kenny would not feature in it.

In 2016, Emer Kenny worked as a scriptwriter on Irish soap Red Rock for a few episodes.

In 2017, she joined the cast of the BBC TV series Father Brown as Penelope "Bunty" Windermere, the wayward niece of Lady Felicia.

Kenny wrote the screenplay for and co-starred in the 2022 ITV crime drama Karen Pirie, adapted from the Karen Pirie novels of Val McDermid. She co-wrote the 2025 second series with Gillian Roger Park.

Kenny voiced Callie Mayer in the Braking Point story mode of F1 23, a role she later reprised in F1 25.

== Awards and nominations ==
For writing the first episode of Karen Pirie, Kenny was nominated for the Edgar Allan Poe Award for Best Episode in a TV Series.

== Personal life ==
Kenny is of Irish and Welsh heritage.

Kenny married television presenter Rick Edwards in 2016, and gave birth to their son in January 2023.

== Filmography ==
Key
†	Denotes television productions that have not yet been released

Television
Year	Title	Role	Notes
2007	Coming Down the Mountain	Gail	
2009	Freefall	Kate	
2009	Lesbian Vampire Killers	Rebecca	Film
2010	EastEnders	Zsa Zsa Carter	56 episodes
2010	EastEnders: E20	Zsa Zsa Carter	Series 1, 12 episodes Series 2, episode 1
2011	Eric and Ernie	Joan Bartlett	Television film
2012–2014	Pramface	Danielle Reeves	
2012	Beaver Falls	Hope	Series 2
2013	Badults	Rachel	Series 1
2014	Siblings	Izzy	Series 1, episode 4
2017–2021	Father Brown	Penelope "Bunty" Windermere	Main role
2020	The Duchess	Rachel	Series 1, episode 3
2022–2023	The Curse	Natasha	Main role
2022–present	Karen Pirie	River Wilde	Recurring role
2026	Number 10 †		Upcoming series

Video games
Year	Title	Role	Notes
2023	F1 23	Callie Mayer	Voice and motion capture
2025	F1 25	Callie Mayer	Voice and motion capture

As writer
Year	Title	Episode(s)
2010–2011	EastEnders: E20	Series 1, episode 2; Series 2, episode 1; Series 3, episode 3
2012–2014	EastEnders	Episode 4423 (8 May 2012); Episode 4724 (7 October 2013); Episode 4883 (3 July 2014)
2012	Doctors	"A Lighter Note" (10 October 2012)
2012	Holby City	"After the Party" (27 November 2012)
2016	Red Rock	Episode 3.5
2018	Harlots	Episode 2.4
2020	Save Me	Episode 2.3
2022–present	Karen Pirie	All episodes
2022	The Bastard Son & The Devil Himself	Episode 7
2023	The Curse	Series 2; additional material
2026	Hijack (TV series)	Episode 2.5
2026	Black Doves	Episode 2.3
