= John Yorke (producer) =

British television producer and script editor

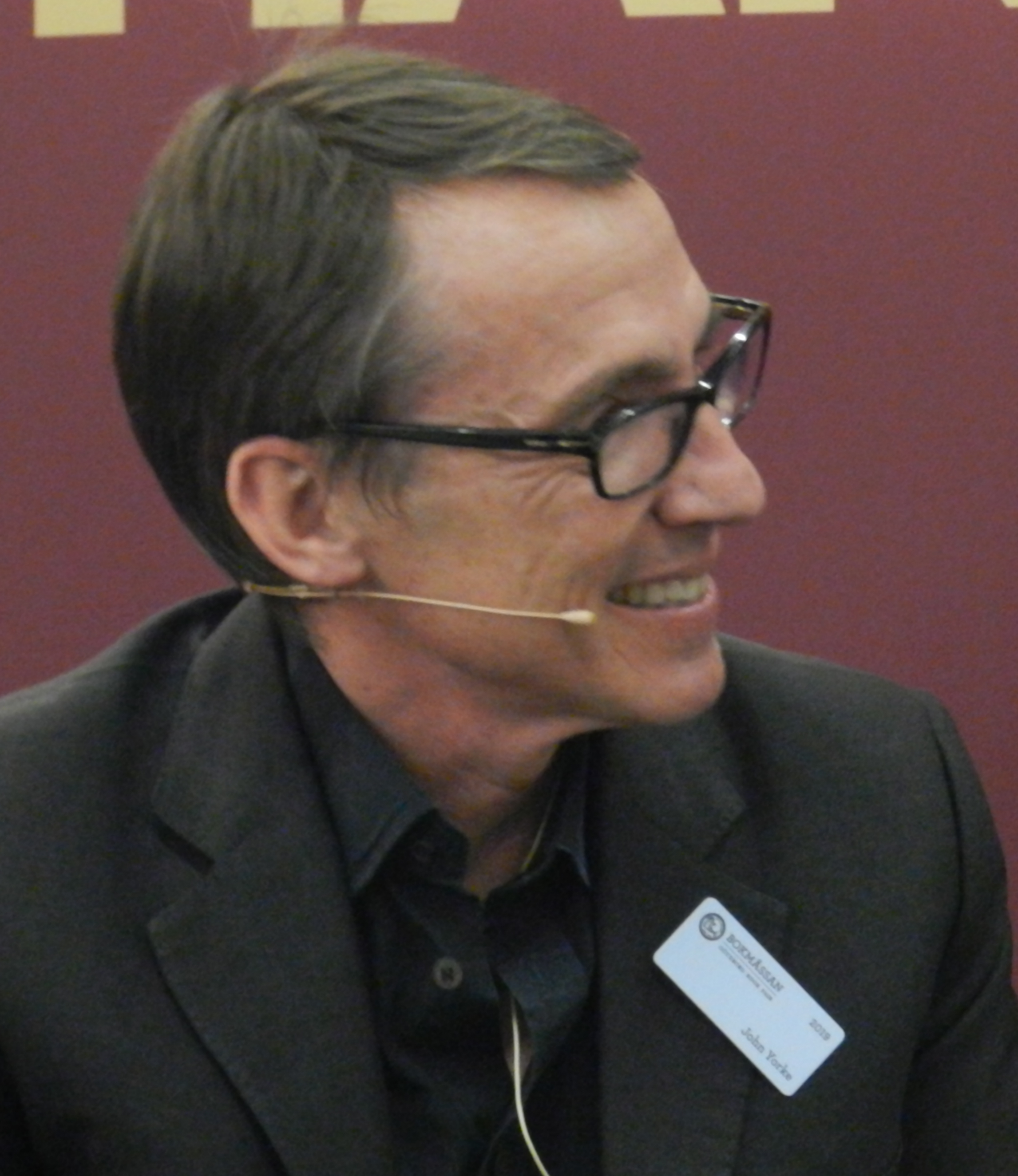
- Yorke in 2019
- Born: John Roland Clifford Yorke; 9 July 1962 (age 64); Barnes, London, England
- Education: Newcastle University
- Occupations: Television producer; script editor
- Years active: 1994–present
- Employer: BBC / Channel 4
- Television: EastEnders, Wolf Hall, Life on Mars

John Roland Clifford Yorke (born 9 July 1962) is a British television producer, screenwriter, editor, and author who, as head of Channel 4 Drama (2003–2005), controller of BBC drama production (2006–2012) and managing director of Company Pictures (2013–2015), has commissioned or produced many award-winning television and radio programmes, including EastEnders, Wolf Hall, Shameless, Life on Mars, Father Brown, Spooks and The Archers. Yorke also founded the BBC Writers Academy.

Yorke taught as a visiting professor of English Language and Literature at the University of Newcastle-upon-Tyne and teaches at the National Film and Television School. Since 2016, Yorke has taught screenwriting and story development through his own company, John Yorke Story.

Yorke is the author of Into the Woods: How Stories Work and Why We Tell Them (2014), an exploration of story structures particularly relevant to film and television, particularly the five-act structure. The book has been translated into multiple languages. Yorke's second book, Trip to the Moon: Understanding the True Power of Story, was published by Penguin in 2016.

== Early life and education ==
Yorke was born and grew up in Stepney, London. He “read avidly” as a child, a fact which he attributes to his mother, saying that she “used to read up to a really exciting bit, toss me the book and then I would have to finish it myself”. His favourite books were by British thriller writers such as Alistair MacLean, Hammond Innes, Ian Fleming, and Mark Twain.

Yorke studied English Literature at Newcastle University and then briefly worked as a theatre director before joining the BBC in 1986.

== Career ==
=== BBC ===
Yorke's first job at the BBC was as a studio manager and then as a producer on BBC Radio 5. In 1994 Yorke moved to television, working as a script editor on EastEnders before becoming the storyline consultant on Casualty. In 1999, after a brief period as producer on Sunburn, he took on the executive producer role on EastEnders. Yorke undertook a “radical shake-up” of the programme, introducing the Slater family and the Trueman family, and axing most of the Di Marco Family. These changes were broadly considered an improvement at the time.

During his tenure the show featured notable storylines such as Ethel Skinner's assisted death, Jim Branning and Dot Cotton's marriage, and "Who Shot Phil?", the finale of which attracted 20,000,000 viewers and led UEFA to move a semi-final match to avoid competing with the EastEnders broadcast slot. Yorke also oversaw some storylines which attracted national controversy. The 2002 episode in which Trevor Morgan attacked Little Mo over Christmas dinner drew so many complaints that the Broadcasting Standards Commission undertook their first study of sex and violence in soap operas in twenty years, and led to considerable negative media coverage. Yorke defended the inclusion of adult and distressing themes, pointing to the fact that police forces had requested copies of the episode to use in training and to the number of real victims who felt encouraged to call the BBC hotline that was promoted during the broadcast. During the period that Yorke was executive producer, EastEnders received commendations from The Meningitis Trust, Mental Health in the Media, the NSPCC, the Police, the National Schizophrenia Fellowship and the Terence Higgins Trust for the show's coverage of social issues.

=== Channel 4 ===
In May 2003, Yorke accepted a job at Channel 4 as the Head of Drama. Although he felt at the time that the channel's drama offering lacked a "coherent identity", he had a broad remit from the director of programmes and considered it an opportunity to make bold choices, stating in an interview: "[w]e need to be looking at the new and the innovative rather than the traditional. I don't want to do costume drama." This approach had some success, with commissions including Shameless, Omagh, and the two-parter Sex Traffic, which Yorke later described as one of the productions he is most proud of. However he was unable to persuade the channel's bosses to develop several of the projects he thought had a lot of potential, including Life on Mars.

=== Return to the BBC ===
After the exit of several key figures in 2005 the BBC offered Yorke a position under the new joint title of Controller of BBC Drama Series and Co-Head of Independent Drama Commissioning. One reason for approaching Yorke in particular was a decline in the popularity of EastEnders, with critics disparaging recent seasons and the show hitting a record low of 6,000,000 in viewers. Yorke returned to the BBC and commissioned several notable shows, whilst also acting as executive producer of the Internet spin-off EastEnders: E20 and BBC daytime drama, Land Girls.

That same year Yorke founded the BBC Writers Academy, a paid year-long training scheme for aspiring television writers. It was unusual in that successful applicants were given the chance to develop scripts for prominent BBC productions, with the finished work ultimately being produced as part of regular programming.

One of Yorke's last significant BBC roles was as acting editor of radio soap The Archers in early 2012, while the programme's editor Vanessa Whitburn took long service leave. Yorke left the BBC again later that year, although he returned briefly in 2017 when the then-executive producer of EastEnders Sean O'Connor stepped down. Although he was contracted for three months, Yorke ended up remaining as executive consultant for slightly over a year, during which time EastEnders won a BAFTA for Continuing Drama.

=== Post-BBC ===
In 2012, Yorke became managing director at Company Pictures, taking over from founders Charles Pattinson and George Faber, both of whom who he had previously worked with on Shameless for Channel 4. During this period he was credited as an executive producer and occasionally a writer on a range of dramas including Skins Redux (2013), The Missing (2014), Red Rock (2015-16) and The Moonstone (2016). In 2015 Company Pictures began production on an ambitious six-part adaptation of Hilary Mantel's Wolf Hall trilogy with Yorke again acting as executive producer. The resulting series was critically acclaimed, winning three Baftas, a Peabody award, and the Golden Globe Award for Best Miniseries or Television Film. In 2021, Yorke served as executive producer for the Channel 4 documentary Death on the Common, which explored the cicumstances and aftermath of the murder of Rachel Nickell from her son's perspective. The same events were used as the basis for the upcoming Netflix true crime drama series The Witness (2026), which Yorke also executively produced.

While working at Company Pictures Yorke completed his first book, Into the Woods: How Stories Work and Why We Tell Them, which was published by Penguin in 2013. The book develops the traditional aristotelian concept of the three-act story structure and compares it with later evolutions such as the five-act structure (sometimes attributed to Shakespeare but more rigorously delineated by the German novellist Gustav Freytag), arguing that “[e]very form of artistic composition, like any language, has a grammar”. Although Yorke argues that the five-act structure is the best interprative model for understanding how stories work, he stresses that Into the Woods "isn't a book advocating its conscious use. Its aim is to explore and examine narrative shape, ask how and why it exists, and why a child can write it effortlessly".

Given Yorke's experience in training and mentoring junior writers many reviewers were surprised that Into the Woods, as one reviewer put it, "is not a how-to book for screenwriters but a philosophical inquiry, with a particular emphasis on structure". Rather than identifying an underlying pattern and telling would-be writers how to follow it, Yorke wrote that he wanted to explore why stories ended up repeating similar patterns across different times and cultures, building an argument for what author and journalist Will Storr has termed Yorke's "hidden symmetry", a process "in which protagonists and antagonists function as opposites with their rising and falling fortunes mirroring one another." Into the Woods continued to be popular with both aspiring writers and academics - according to the publisher, it has sold over 250,000 copies, and Henry Sutton, who co-directs the UK's highest-ranked creative writing undergraduate course, has described it as a "seminal" work.

Yorke has continued to move into more roles involving teaching and speaking. In 2014, he presented his work on fundamental story structures as part of the Talks at Google speaker series, and in 2019 the BBC relaunched the BBC Writers Academy as part of BBC Studios, and Yorke was appointed as Head of the programme.

In 2016 Yorke founded John Yorke Story, an accredited online learning provider which runs training courses in writing for various genres and mediums, as well as other media production roles.

=== Radio ===
Since 2023 Yorke has presented the weekly BBC Radio 4 series Opening Lines, which explores the themes and cultural impact of the books and plays dramatised for Radio 4's weeend afternoon dramas. He has also worked as a narrative consultant for audio platforms including BBC Studios and Wondery, and on popular productions including Hannah Fry's Unchartered and Rosamund Pike's Mother, Neighbor, Russian Spy.

== Notable commissions ==
Yorke commissioned Waterloo Road on his return to the BBC from Channel 4. Briefed to find a new returning pre-watershed drama, he approached Shed Productions, who had made Bad Girls and Footballers Wives. During early conversations Yorke had the idea of using a school precinct as a setting, and Anne McManus and Maureen Chadwick wrote a pilot episode. After the first series aied in 2006, Yorke asked Anne Mensah – then assistant commissioning editor – to would take over, and under Mensah the show moved to BBC Scotland where it continued until 2015. In September 2021, it was announced that Waterloo Road would be revived and new seasons resumed from 2023.

After listening to a Radio 4 programme on GK Chesterton's Father Brown book series, Yorke proposed creating a television adaptation which would become Father Brown. BBC Daytime commissioned the first season and Yorke asked two of his former BBC Writers Academy students to create the show. It aired in January 2013 on BBC One and Yorke was executive producer for two seasons. On its thirteenth season in 2026, it is the UK's number one daytime drama series by viewers.

One of the first shows Yorke wanted develop at Channel 4 was Life on Mars, but according to show writer Ashley Pharoah broadcasters had been "very anxious about it as a concept". Although Yorke redeveloped the original script over 18 months it was ultimately turned down by director of programmes Kevin Lygo. When Yorke returned to the BBC, the show was finally greenlit by Julie Gardner, Head of Drama at BBC Wales. Yorke acted as joint commissioning editor for the show's entire run (2006 – 2007).

== Award-winning productions ==
This is a list of awards given to productions on which Yorke is credited as a producer or executive producer, where the award recognises the production as a whole.

See also List of awards and nominations received by EastEnders.

Year	Production	Awarding Body	Award	Result	Notes
1999	EastEnders	BAFTA Television Awards	Best Soap	Won	
1999	EastEnders	The British Soap Awards	Best British Soap	Nominated	
2000	EastEnders	BAFTA Television Awards	Best Soap	Won	
2000	EastEnders	The British Soap Awards	Best British Soap	Won	
2001	EastEnders	BAFTA Television Awards	Best Soap	Nominated	
2001	EastEnders	The British Soap Awards	Best British Soap	Won	
2002	EastEnders	BAFTA Television Awards	Best Soap	Won	
2002	EastEnders	The British Soap Awards	Best British Soap	Won	
2003	EastEnders	The British Soap Awards	Best British Soap	Nominated	
2004	EastEnders	The British Soap Awards	Best British Soap	Won	
2004	Omagh	Toronto International Film Festival	Discovery Award	Won	
2004	Omagh	Irish Film and Television Awards	Best Irish Film	Won	
2005	Omagh	BAFTA Television Awards	Best Single Drama	Won	
2005	Omagh	Monte Carlo Television Awards	Golden Nymph (Best Televivision Film)	Won	
2005	Sex Traffic	Gemini Awards	Best Dramatic Mini-Series	Won	
2005	Sex Traffic	BAFTA Television Awards	Best Drama Serial	Won	
2005	Sex Traffic	Royal Television Society Programme Awards	Drama Serial	Won	
2005	EastEnders	The British Soap Awards	Best British Soap	Nominated	
2006	EastEnders	BAFTA Television Awards	Best Soap	Won	
2006	EastEnders	The British Soap Awards	Best British Soap	Won	
2006	Life on Mars	International Emmy Awards	Best Drama Series	Won	
2006	Life on Mars	TV Quick and Choice Awards	Best New Drama	Nominated	
2007	EastEnders	BAFTA Television Awards	Best Soap	Nominated	
2007	EastEnders	The British Soap Awards	Best British Soap	Nominated	
2007	Life on Mars	BAFTA Television Awards	Best Drama Series	Nominated	
2007	Life on Mars	BAFTA Television Awards	Pioneer Award	Won	
2008	EastEnders	BAFTA Television Awards	Best Soap	Nominated	
2008	EastEnders	The British Soap Awards	Best British Soap	Won	
2008	EastEnders	Digital Spy Soap Awards	Best Soap	Won	
2008	Jekyll	Saturn Awards	Best International Series	Nominated	
2008	Jekyll	Monte Carlo Television Awards	Golden Nymph (Best Miniseries)	Nominated	
2009	EastEnders	BAFTA Television Awards	Best Soap	Nominated	
2009	EastEnders	Digital Spy Soap Awards	Soap of the Year	Won	
2009	EastEnders	The British Soap Awards	Best British Soap	Won	
2010	EastEnders	BAFTA Television Awards	Best Soap	Won	
2010	EastEnders	The British Soap Awards	Best British Soap	Won	
2010	EastEnders: E20	Banff World Television Festival	Original Online Programs	Nominated	
2010	Land Girls	Broadcast Awards	Best Daytime Programme	Won	
2010	Land Girls	Royal Television Society Awards	Best Drama	Won	
2011	EastEnders	BAFTA Television Awards	Best Soap	Won	
2011	EastEnders	The British Soap Awards	Best British Soap	Won	
2011	EastEnders	Digital Spy Soap Awards	Best Soap	Won	
2011	EastEnders	Broadcast Awards	Best Soap/Continuing Drama	Nominated	
2011	EastEnders: E20	Webby Award	Drama	Nominated	
2012	EastEnders	BAFTA Television Awards	Best Soap	Nominated	
2012	EastEnders	The British Soap Awards	Best British Soap	Won	
2012	EastEnders: E20	Virgin Media TV Awards	Best Soap	Nominated	
2015	The Missing	Golden Globe Awards	Best Miniseries or Television Film	Nominated	
2015	The Missing	BAFTA Television Awards	Best Drama Series	Nominated	
2015	Wolf Hall	Critics' Choice Television Awards	Best Limited Series	Nominated	
2015	Wolf Hall	2015 Peabody Awards	Entertainment	Won	
2015	Wolf Hall	Primetime Emmy Awards	Outstanding Limited Series	Nominated	
2016	Wolf Hall	Satellite Awards	Best Television Limited Series	Won	
2016	Wolf Hall	Golden Globe Awards	Best Miniseries or Television Film	Won	
2016	Wolf Hall	BAFTA Television Awards	Best Drama Series	Won	
2018	Red Rock	Irish Film and Television Awards	Best Television Drama Series	Won	
2019	EastEnders	BAFTA Television Awards	Best Soap	Won	
2023	Father Brown	TV Choice Awards	Best Family Drama	Nominated	
