= S.K.I.T.Z Beatz =

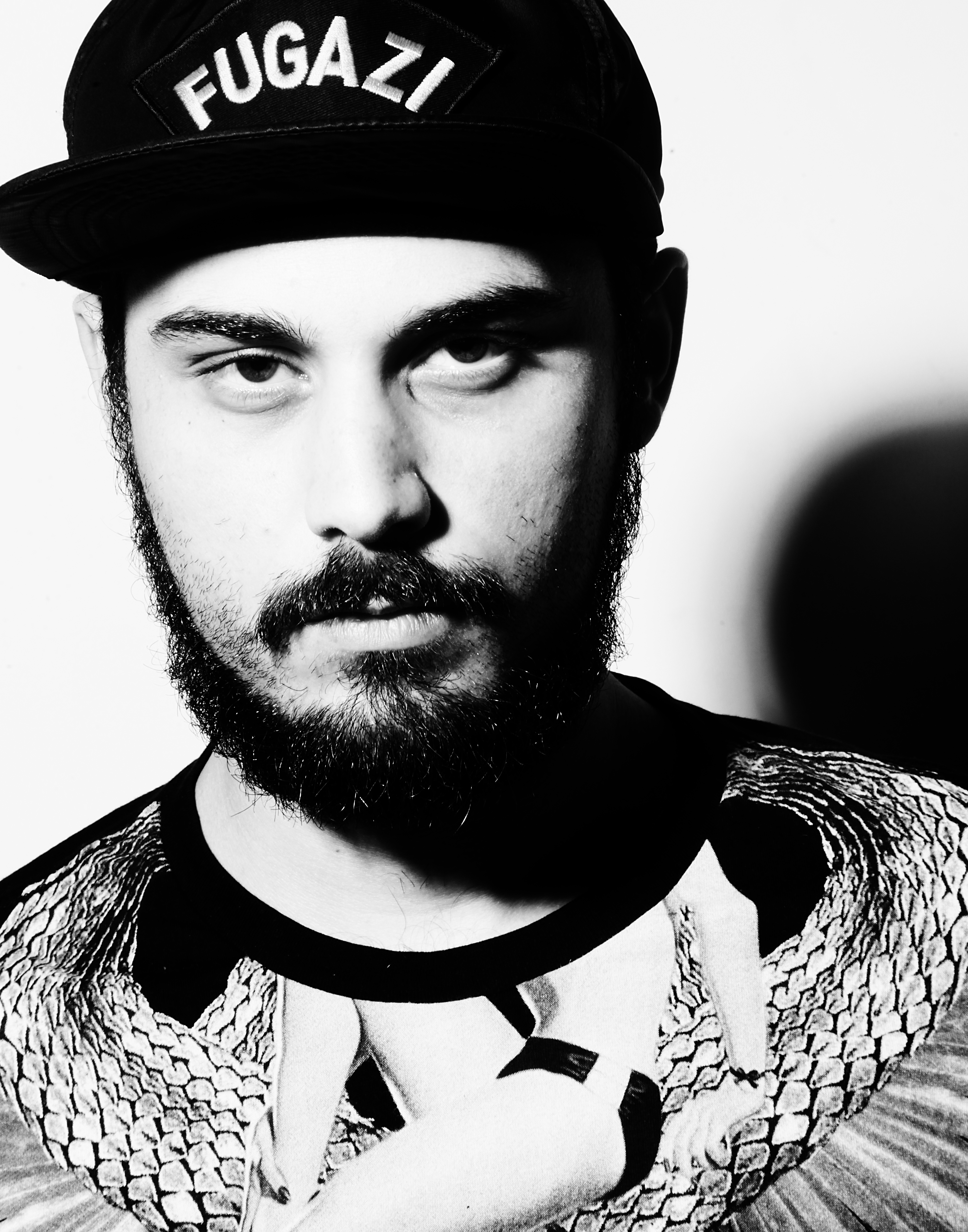
- S.K.I.T.Z. Beatz in 2015

Background information
- Born: Aiden Robert Hogarth; 2 May 1988 (age 38)
- Origin: Halifax, West Yorkshire, England
- Genres: Electronic; grime; hip hop; juke house
- Occupations: Record Producer, Composer, Music Supervisor, DJ, Record Label Owner, Songwriter
- Years active: 2004—present
- Label: N/A

Aiden Robert Hogarth (born 2 May 1988) better known as S.K.I.T.Z Beatz is an English composer and record producer based in London, England, and has been responsible for production for brand campaigns for Nike, Adidas, Jaguar, Lexus, Guinness, Puma, River Island & Ford and PlayStation.

In a February 2015 editorial feature popular music website Noisey credited SK!TZ with being "One of the most respected producers in the British scene".

== Collaborators ==
Hogarth has also produced for many notable artists including: Dizzee Rascal, Wiley, Skepta, Tempa T. and Wretch 32.

In mid-2015 Hogarth assisted American producer Timbaland on production for the record "Come Get It" feat Pusha T, Emerson Windy and P Money the video was exclusively premiered on MTV.

== Television and film ==
In 2010, he was appointed as composer on BBC's EastEnders: E20 followed by MTV series 'Slips' Channel 4 / E4's musical dramedy Youngers. with the British newspaper The Observer highlighting that Youngers "deserves every award going including best soundtrack". In a Tweet on 9 December 2014, he revealed that he had 'finished composition on Dani's Castle for BBC & ABC3' and the Channel 4 documentary Men In Pubs. In early 2017 Hogarth headed up composition on Channel 4 television series Pirate Mentality and Sky Atlantic production Guerilla Sounds featuring Idris Elba + Frida Pinto, in addition to composing the soundtrack for UK feature film The Weekend.

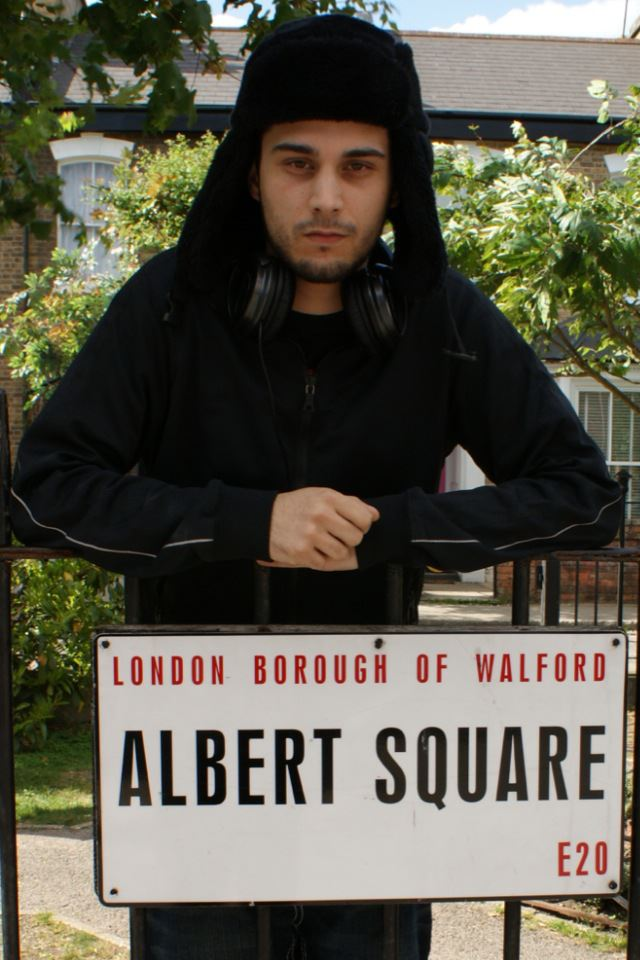
