= EastEnders: E20 =

British internet soap opera (2010–2011)

- The EastEnders: E20 series 3 titles
- Genre: Soap opera Teen drama
- Created by: Diederick Santer
- Developed by: Diederick Santer; John Yorke; Bryan Kirkwood
- Directed by: Michael Keillor (series 1–2); John Howlett (series 3)
- Starring: Emer Kenny; Ricky Norwood; Sam Attwater; Bunmi Mojekwu; Heshima Thompson; Amanda Fairbank-Hynes; Emaa Hussen; Tosin Cole; Samuell Benta; Sophie Colquhoun; Modupe Adeyeye
- Theme music composer: Simon May; Carl Darling
- Opening theme: Remix of the EastEnders theme tune
- Composers: Michael Palmer; Aiden Hogarth
- Country of origin: United Kingdom
- Original language: English
- No. of series: 3
- No. of episodes: 37 (list of episodes)

Production
- Executive producers: Diederick Santer (series 1); John Yorke (series 1–3); Bryan Kirkwood (series 2–3); Sarah Miller (series 3)
- Producer: Deborah Sathe
- Production location: BBC Elstree Centre
- Editors: Rob Platt; Stephen Young
- Camera setup: Multi-camera
- Running time: 3–16 minutes
- Production company: BBC

Original release
- Network: BBC Online
- Release: 8 January 2010 – 21 October 2011

Related
- EastEnders

EastEnders: E20 (sometimes just E20) is a British Internet soap opera, which aired from January 2010 to October 2011. A spin-off from the established BBC soap EastEnders, it is set in EastEnders' regular setting of Albert Square, a Victorian square in the fictional borough of Walford, in the East End of London. Each series follows a group of teenage characters: Zsa Zsa Carter (Emer Kenny), Leon Small (Sam Attwater), Fatboy (Ricky Norwood) and Mercy Olubunmi (Bunmi Mojekwu) in series 1; Asher Levi (Heshima Thompson) and his brother Sol (Tosin Cole), Naz Mehmet (Emaa Hussen), and Stevie Dickinson (Amanda Fairbank-Hynes) in series 2; and Ava Bourne (Sophie Colquhoun), Donnie Lester (Samuell Benta) and Faith Olubunmi (Modupe Adeyeye) in series 3. The show's title comes from Walford's fictional London postcode district, E20. The four characters from series 1 also appear in EastEnders, as well as Faith from series 3.

EastEnders: E20 originally aired as part of the main show's 25th anniversary celebrations. It was devised in a bid to develop and nurture new talent, including writers, actors, composers and remixers, and target a younger audience, as well as to attempt to drive more people onto the Internet. The series was the idea of executive producers Diederick Santer, who wanted a show where regular EastEnders characters would be in the background, and John Yorke, who wanted to improve the portrayal of teenagers in EastEnders and to get younger people writing for it.

The show's writers, all newcomers aged between 17 and 22, were selected through a writing competition, and created the series at a BBC summer school. The theme tune was also selected through a competition, promoted on BBC Radio 1. The show primarily operates as a standalone series but also cross-references storylines of the main soap, and features cameo appearances from several of the regular characters from EastEnders. The episodes are between three and 16 minutes each in length and are available via EastEnders' official website. Omnibus editions were also available on BBC iPlayer, BBC Red Button and, from April 2010, BBC Three.

== Conception and development ==
EastEnders: E20 was conceived by executive producer Diederick Santer as part of EastEnders' 25th anniversary celebrations. Described as the "naughty little brother or sister to the main show", it was devised in a bid to target younger viewers and to develop and nurture new talent. Executive producer John Yorke, who oversaw the show, and is also controller of BBC drama production and new talent, said "Fundamentally the whole idea of the show is it's a training ground for new talent, be that acting, writing, composing, remixing, everything. The fact is because it's online, we can take risks." Nevertheless, the makers said they knew they had to get it right because "the eyes of the World Wide Web would be watching."

Santer conceived the idea of a "parallel universe show" with new characters, where the regular characters are in the background. Yorke sought to improve the portrayal of teenagers in EastEnders and to get younger people writing for it. The ideas came together and EastEnders: E20 was created in what Yorke described as "one of the quickest periods from idea to screen I've ever known." Regarding the decision to create an online drama, Yorke said, "People don't watch television at fixed times anymore, they use iPlayer [to] get it at their convenience and so it made sense to make a programme that [viewers] can specifically get at their convenience." The show's producer, Deborah Sathe, added, "Technology is changing and it's changing really quickly and I think it's really appropriate that the BBC is leading the way in offering online content." The first series was commissioned by multi-platform commissioning executive Rosie Allimonos.

Another incentive for the show was to get more people to use the Internet. Sathe stated that it was an opportunity for younger people to bring the older members of their families onto the internet, and Yorke hoped that it would bring people onto the internet who had not used it before. Simon Nelson, BBC Vision controller of multiplatform and portfolio, said that this was an opportunity for the BBC to develop its expertise in drama production by exploiting the creative potential of the Internet to create a new online drama where few have succeeded. EastEnders: E20 primarily operates as a standalone series but also cross-references storylines of the main soap. According to Santer, the series also explores the stories of the soap's anonymous bystanders. He said, "There are always other people [in EastEnders] milling round the market and houses that we never go into. There are four or five parallels you could do. It will be nice to see well-known characters through strangers' eyes. Ian Beale may show up and he is just a strange, irritating man. Or they might ask: 'Who is that moody girl in the market?' And it will be Stacey Slater."

=== Series 2 ===
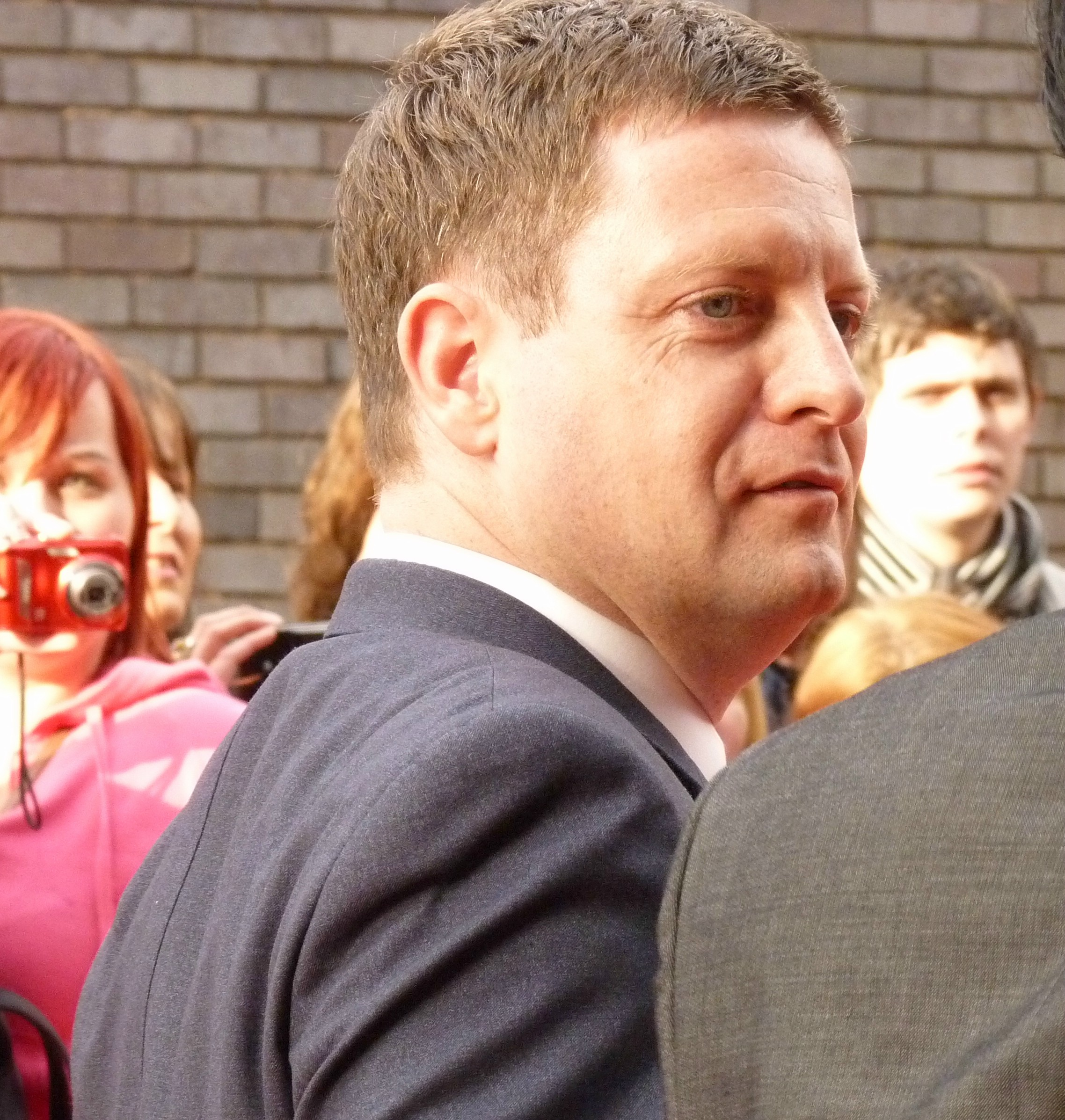
Bryan Kirkwood became an executive producer of EastEnders: E20 in 2010.

The second series was announced on 8 April 2010, brought back by Santer's successor, Bryan Kirkwood and commissioned by Sarah Clay. Nelson explained "We had no hesitation in commissioning another series, something which will delight the 17,000 fans who've been calling for more episodes on the E20 Facebook page." Script producer Peter Mattessi promised that the second series would take the characters to darker, scarier and more unattractive parts of their personalities, writer Muge Ahmet said it would be sexier, and Sathe stated there would be big secrets, while writer Alex Oates said that the show and the writers had grown up a lot since the first series. The Daily Star newspaper reported that the second series would be more controversial than the first, including scenes of drug dealing and violence.

With the return of the series, Sathe explained that some of the show's writers had already worked with the EastEnders team on storylines for the characters they had created, and hoped this would continue as the E20 brand develops, and that the show would become a "junior version" of the BBC Writers Academy. Series 2 sees the introduction of street dance to the series to give it an "authentic East End flavour of youth". The episodes were made all the same length following complaints about the length of episodes in the first series and the decision to show the series on BBC Three. Social networking site Twitter was also used to introduce teasers, with four of the characters having their own profiles.

=== Series 3 ===
A third series was announced on 27 September 2010, commissioned by BBC Learning, as part of a new BBC strategy to provide learning opportunities for all audiences. Saul Nassé, Controller of Learning, said, "I want to use BBC programmes that are known and loved by audiences that can serve as springboards for learning. [...] We'll be enlisting the help of the BBC's best talent to maximise the reach of our output," and Sathe commented, "We are thrilled with the success of the first two series and have already started to storyline the third. Be prepared for a few familiar faces, a couple of new ones and a lot of fireworks." It was confirmed that Learning would fund the third series and work with young people to develop storylines "that bring to life subjects in the Personal, Social, Health Education (PSHE) curriculum such as bullying or peer pressure." A regional schools tour was organised to tie in with the launch of the series, with pupils writing short scenes based on scenarios tying in with the PSHE curriculum, which were performed, filmed and edited. Sarah Miller, BBC Learning commissioner and executive producer of series 3, explained: "The schools tour was a terrific opportunity to deliver powerful face-to-face workshops, giving students and teachers the opportunity to develop key media production skills and to get behind the scenes of a top BBC drama."

== Production ==
The show was produced by television newcomer Deborah Sathe. The production process for series 1 took about six months, from commissioning to the final cut. Yorke stated that, "Television takes a notoriously long time to make and one of the joys of doing this online is that it's been incredibly quick, about a quarter of the time it would take a normal show to get off the ground. It's smaller, it's easier to do and also there's a collective will for it to succeed."

=== Writing ===
The first series was written by a team of 13 writers from London aged between 17 and 22 who responded to a writing competition and attended a summer school in August 2009 as part of the BBC's new talent initiative, where they created the entire series. The summer school took place over four weeks, with the first two weeks in Theatre Royal Stratford East and the last two at the BBC Elstree Centre. The writers did not know they would be writing a spin-off to EastEnders until they arrived. The writers, including Florence Vincent, Alex Oates, Kashman Harris and Emer Kenny, also wrote the ten episodes of series 2. They are from various parts of London, which Sathe said was "brilliant" as they represent different parts of life in London, and they have grown up with the Internet as a native medium. Santer stated that the writers created a new Walford, calling it a "fresh perspective on a British classic." The writers were given a day to travel around East London to listen to people talking to get ideas. Sathe commented: "We created some brilliant scenes from the eavesdropping stuff." After the summer school, the writers were commissioned to write the 12 episodes of series 1. Some of the scripts were allowed by be changed by the actors if they thought lines were not authentic, such as the use of London street slang. Sathe considered the use of slang to be a highlight of the series, calling it her proudest moment. Storylining and character creation for series 2 started in January 2010. The third series used mostly different writers to the first two. Each potential writer had to send in a monologue for a character they would like to see on television and the production team chose their favourites. The writers were then asked to write a scene between their character and one of the established EastEnders characters. Following this, the writers were interviewed and the most promising fifteen were selected. Kenny returned as a writer for series 3 and was joined by several of the young EastEnders cast members: Arinze Kene (Connor Stanley), Himesh Patel (Tamwar Masood) and Charlie G Hawkins (Darren Miller).

=== Filming ===
EastEnders: E20 was filmed on the same set as EastEnders, using three handheld cameras to give it a more "edgy" feel compared to EastEnders, which is filmed with cameras on tripods. Director Michael Keillor stated that although using handheld cameras is normally easier, the fact it was shot with a multiple-camera setup made it more challenging and created problems for the lighting and props teams as nobody knew exactly where the camera would be. Keillor said it was a "particularly tough day" when filming a party scene in a flat, as normally walls of the set would be removed but all the walls were left in to make it look more realistic, meaning the crew overheated. Series 1 was filmed over ten days with approximately 120 minutes of television being shot. Each of the first series' 12 episodes are between three and 16 minutes in length. The second series features 10 episodes averaging 14 minutes each, which was a response to complaints from viewers about the length of some of the episodes in series 1. Series 3 began production in May 2011, and took about four weeks to film.

=== Music ===
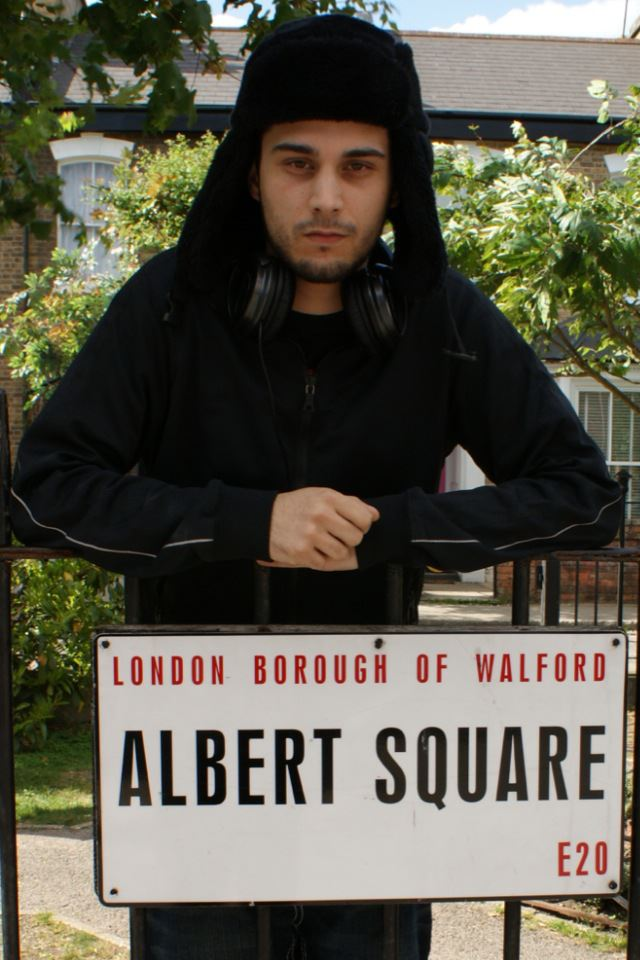
Aiden Hogarth, music director and composer for EastEnders: E20's second series

Unlike EastEnders, E20 uses incidental music, which Scott Matthewman of The Stage said makes it feel like an episode of Hollyoaks, a Channel 4 soap opera targeted at a teen audience. A remix of the EastEnders theme tune was created for the series, with members of the public submitting remixes in a competition held on the BBC website. The competition opened on 11 November 2009 and was officially launched on 13 November by Annie Mac on her BBC Radio 1 show. More than 250 entries were submitted. They were reduced to four and judged by Sathe, Santer, Keillor, original theme tune composer Simon May, and BBC Radio 1Xtra's DJ Ace. The winner, 21-year-old Carl Darling, was announced on 4 December 2009. He said "I was very excited to hear that my track was chosen by such an eclectic judging panel. And to spend time in the BBC studios and walking around the Square was phenomenal. I have grown up hearing Simon May's original theme tune and watching Albert Square and the iconic Queen Vic, so I feel very privileged to be a part of EastEnders: E20 history!" Darling explained that he wanted to keep all the "essential features" of the original theme, but to make a grimy drum and bass version.

Additionally producers worked with BBC Introducing to give unsigned bands and musicians the chance to have their music used on the series 2 soundtrack, and grime music producer Aiden "S.K.I.T.Z Beatz" Hogarth was appointed music director and composer, having been unable to take the role for series 1. He said "For E20 I will be providing all the best and what's current from the underground and mainstream music scene and instead of having the music playing out of stereos and stalls, we've taken the step to compose and source music as a soundtrack. Something seasoned EastEnders fans may not be familiar with. I honestly think that the viewers are ready for a refreshing and brand new take on how music direction for this show and others like it should be done."

== Casting ==
"Not content with having E20 written by new writers, and our theme tune remixed by the audience, we've now found four talented newcomers from London to front the show. Emer, Bunmi, Ricky and Sam are brilliant young performers, noisy and fun."

— Diederick Santer, executive producer of EastEnders: E20

Casting of the new characters for series 1 was announced on 25 November 2009. Open auditions were held at Theatre Royal Stratford East, followed by recalls until the possible actors were reduced to eight and then four. Yorke described it as a "painful process" and they had difficulty finding someone to play Zsa Zsa Carter. Emer Kenny was cast in the role whilst writing the second episode. Yorke said "She was so good that we suddenly went, 'It's her!'" Kenny said, "I'm really thrilled to have been given the opportunity to both write for and act in a show connected with such an iconic drama as EastEnders. Kids these days use their laptops more than their televisions, so it's really exciting to be a part of a project that's taking drama online and connecting with these viewers." To prepare for the role, Kenny had to disguise her "posh" accent, saying that when the director asked her what she would do about her voice, she travelled around the East End to listen to the way people spoke.

On his casting in the role of Fatboy, television newcomer Ricky Norwood said, "It's an honour to now be a part of [the] show. I am born and bred in the East End [so] it feels like a homecoming." Norwood adapted his own use of slang into the character to "try and bring it and from a true place." Bunmi Mojekwu, who plays Mercy Olubunmi, commented "I feel so blessed to be part of EastEnders: E20. My first day on set was just crazy. I was on Albert Square – a dream come true – I'm enjoying every second." Sam Attwater, who previously appeared in five episodes of Hollyoaks, was cast as boxer Leon Small. On his casting, he commented, "It's a great privilege to be working with such great actors and on such an established show. It's an amazing opportunity and I'm really enjoying tackling a character like Leon who has so much going on," He prepared for the role by attending a gym, as the character has a lot of topless scenes. He said: "As soon as I heard that I was straight down the gym. Lots of crunches. Everyone said don't worry about it, but every time I did one of those scenes I had to watch it back and see how it looked because there will be 10 million people watching it. I want to be on the best form."

The cast for series 2 were announced on 29 July 2010. Heshima Thompson and Tosin Cole were cast as brothers Asher and Sol Levi. Cole, who has previously starred in a modern adaptation of Shakespeare's Julius Caesar, said, "It's a privilege to work on something so big but so different. Everyone is fantastic to work with. I'm really excited." Thompson, who has appeared in The Bill and Spooks, stated "It's a great project to be a part of and I get to dance so this is going to be fun." Emaa Hussen was cast as Naz Mehmet, her first professional acting role, on which she commented: "it's a really exciting place to start my career. I'm from East London and a big fan of EastEnders, which is one of the reasons I wanted to do the show." Finally, Amanda Fairbank-Hynes, who appeared in An Education, said of her casting as Stevie Dickinson, "It all happened so quickly but I'm really excited to be working on EastEnders. It's an amazing group of people and they are great to work with." Additionally, Hollyoaks actress Roxanne McKee, and dance acts Flawless and Avant Garde also make appearances. Flawless were asked to appear in the show by Sathe, who has previously worked with Marlon Wallen from the troupe.

== Broadcasting ==
Each of the first series' episodes were made available on varying days of the week at 8.30pm via EastEnders' official website, starting on 8 January 2010 and ending on 25 January 2010. The series was also available in three omnibus shows on BBC iPlayer and via BBC Red Button after the EastEnders omnibus aired on BBC One. The first omnibus, comprising episodes 1–4, was available for one week from 17 January. The second omnibus was available for one week from 24 January, containing episodes 5–8. Episodes 9–12 were available as an omnibus from 31 January 2010. Additionally, the series was re-edited into three 30-minute editions and shown weekly on BBC Three from 23 April 2010.

The second series began on 7 September 2010, with two episodes being made available weekly on Tuesdays and Thursdays, excluding episode 2, which was available on a Wednesday. The series comprises 10 episodes in total of around 14 minutes each, and was also screened in five omnibus editions on BBC Three on Monday nights. Series 3 comprises 15 episodes of around 10 minutes each. Extra footage, such as video blogs and behind-the-scenes clips, is also available online. All episodes from all three series remain available to view on the BBC website.

== Characters ==
Each series features new teenage characters who move to Walford, as well as cameos from existing characters from the main show. The characters are described as sixth form students trying to escape from "family problems and crises of their own making". Series 1 follows Zsa Zsa, Fatboy, Mercy and Leon, who move into 89b George Street in Walford. Leon, Fatboy and Zsa Zsa also appeared briefly in EastEnders in January 2010 before EastEnders: E20 started, and returned as regular characters when EastEnders: E20 ended. It was later announced that due to positive reaction to the character, Mercy would also join EastEnders later in 2010. Series 2 follows brothers Sol and Asher, plus Naz and Stevie. Sathe said there was a "good chance" that they would also appear in EastEnders at some point. Zsa Zsa, Mercy and Leon also have cameo appearances in series 2, and Fatboy has a recurring role. Series 3 follows newcomers Ava, Donnie and Faith, Mercy's sister. Donnie's younger sister, Riley, also appears along with Richard, a care worker. Naz and Sol also make a cameo appearance. Fatboy continues his recurring role, along with Mercy and Faith's grandmother Grace Olubunmi, and regular EastEnders character Zainab Masood.

== Reception ==
=== Viewership and critical reception ===
Between 8 and 21 January 2010, EastEnders: E20 material available via the EastEnders website and BBC iPlayer, including episodes, behind the scenes videos and extra content, received 1.7 million views. By 19 February 2010, the episodes had 2.8 million views with additional content pushing the total to 3.3 million. Santer was reported to be "knocked out" by the figures, saying: "For our little side project, something that started life as an experiment, to go so big is very exciting. I'm delighted in particular that the 13 young London writers who wrote the series have reached such an audience with their first professional work." EastEnders: E20's official Facebook fan page grew in membership from 100 to 5000 in a matter of hours after the spin-off started, and as of 19 February 2010, had over 16,000 fans. Yorke said that due to the popularity of the first series, they hoped to make further spin-offs. The first BBC Three omnibus edition on 23 April 2010 received 302,000 viewers and a 1.4% audience share according to overnight figures. by 13 October 2011, series 3 had gained viewing figures across both BBC Online and BBC Three of 1.2 million viewers, and a 50% increase in its online audience since it launched on 20 September 2011. Sathe commented: "I am thrilled to see E20 has sustained its position as a front-runner in online drama." Grace Dent of The Guardian described the series as "rather brilliant", while Patrick Smith of The Daily Telegraph called it "vibrant" and Tony Stewart of the Daily Mirror called Zsa Zsa an "impressive" character. However, website Watch With Mothers gave a negative review of the show, saying "there’s no need for it." After the first episode of series 2 was available, Scott Matthewman from The Stage said "while it's good to have more black and minority ethnic characters in the Square, by concentrating on a very narrow age range of characters it'll make it all the harder for any new blood to effectively mesh into the full show."

=== Awards and nominations ===
In 2010, EastEnders: E20 was shortlisted for a Banff World Television Festival award in the Original Online Programs category. In April 2011, the show was nominated for a Webby Award in the Drama category. Sathe commented on this: "I am so proud of what we have achieved with EastEnders: E20, and to be nominated for a Webby proves how far the series has come." The show went on to win the award, on which Yorke stated, "To win such a prestigious award is a huge honour for all the team—and proof that the EastEnders brand is as brave and innovatory as it was when it first started, a quarter of a century ago." In December 2011, Sathe won the Creative Innovation Award at the Women in TV & Film Awards for her work on E20.

In 2012, Benta received a Screen Nation Awards nomination in the Emerging Talent category for his role as Donnie, while Adeyeye received a special mention for her role as Faith. The same year, the series was nominated in the Best Soap category at the Virgin Media TV Awards.

Awards and nominations for EastEnders: E20
| Year | Award | Category | Nominee | Result |
|---|---|---|---|---|
| 2010 | Banff World Television Festival | Original Online Programs | EastEnders: E20 | Shortlisted |
| 2011 | Webby Awards | Drama | EastEnders: E20 | Won |
| 2011 | Women in TV & Film Awards | Creative Innovation Award | Deborah Sathe (producer) | Won |
| 2012 | Virgin Media TV Awards | Best Soap | EastEnders: E20 | Nominated |
| 2013 | Screen Nation Awards | Emerging Talent | Samuell Benta (Donnie Lester) | Nominated |

== See also ==
- List of EastEnders television spin-offs
- List of teen dramas
- List of television programmes broadcast by the BBC
- List of television spin-offs
