= Emerson Windy =

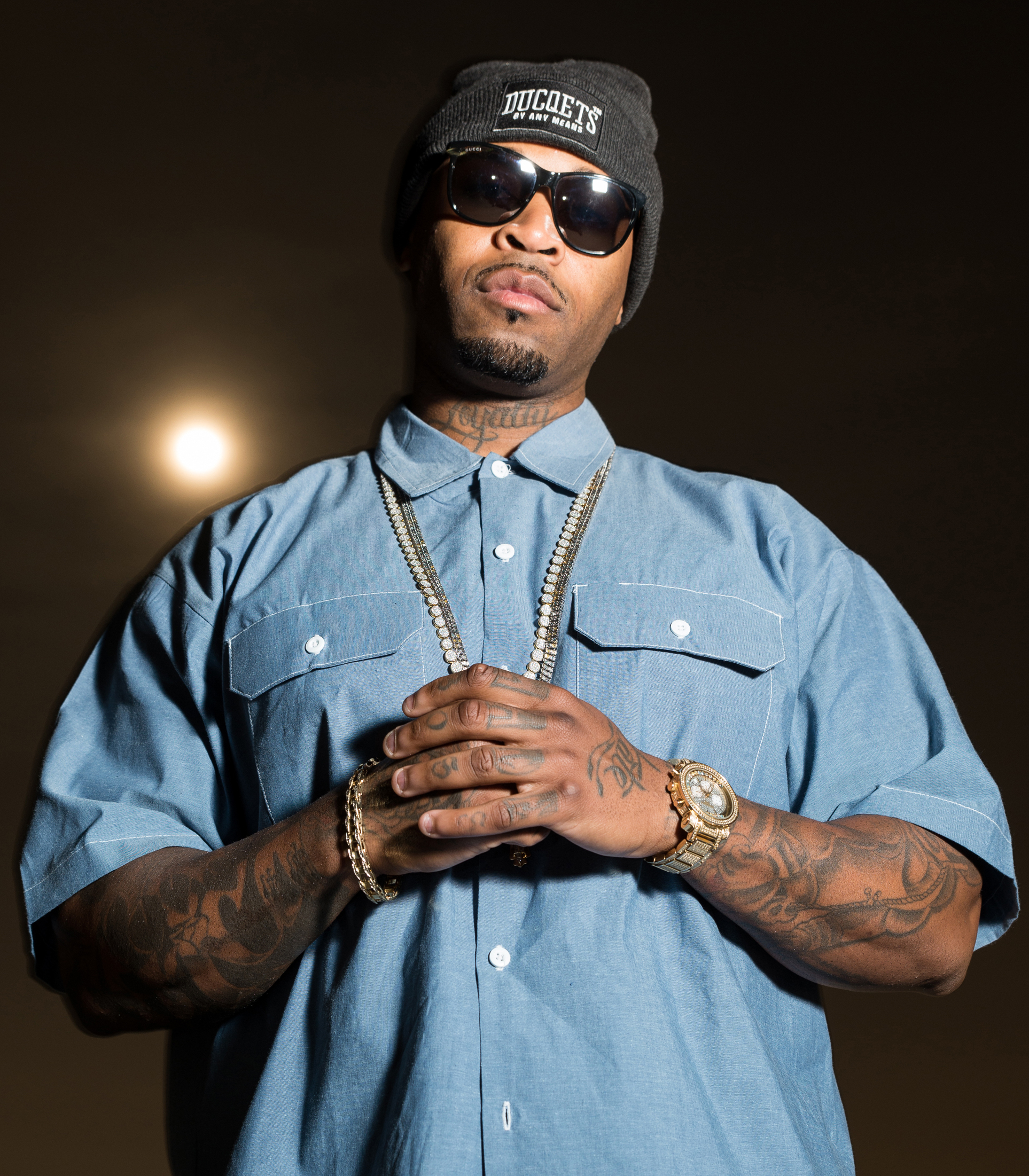
- Windy in 2014

Background information
- Origin: Oceanside, California, United States
- Genres: Hip hop
- Occupations: Rapper, Producer, Writer, CEO
- Years active: 2012–present
- Label: Pearl Harbor Entertainment (current) Universal Music Group (2013–2014)
- Website: emersonwindy.com

Emerson Windy is a West Coast hip hop recording artist from Oceanside, California. He is the founder, President and CEO of southern California based, independent label Pearl Harbor Entertainment. In May 2014, Emerson Windy released his debut project Herojuana on Datpiff.com and his first single "Peace Pipe" on WorldStarHipHop.com which garnered over 14 million views within days of release. Expanding his reach overseas, Windy worked with S.K.I.T.Z Beatz on a remix of "Come Get It" feat Pusha T & P Money (Originally produced by Timbaland ) has been featured on Noisey by Vice to over a million subscribers. The single was premiered exclusively on MTV Wrap UP where it was quickly picked up and released by Complex, Hip Hop DX, 2DopeBoyz, Stereogum, IllRoots and more.

== Biography ==
Emerson Windy grew up in Oceanside, California as an athlete playing football. Abandoning sports, he chose the path of a producer. Having started behind the controls he produced beats for the likes of Snoop Dogg, Waka Flocka Flame, Crooked I and Three 6 Mafia. Fueled by his mother passing from cancer, Emerson Windy decided it was the time to step out from behind the controls and begin a new path as a recording artist. Within ten days he created his first album The Emerson Windy Experience (unreleased). This album was printed up on a marijuana scented, scratch-n-sniff CD—one of the first of its kind. RadCircle.com interviewed Emerson, asking more about this idea. His single "Mr. Weedman" was reviewed by Beware at Uproxx.com via The Smoking Section, calling it "easy-listening hum-along joint, which is well-structured all around and really lets his outgoing personality shine. It’s actually very reminiscent of a Bobby Ray record, which is typically a good look.."

== Debut album release and controversy ==
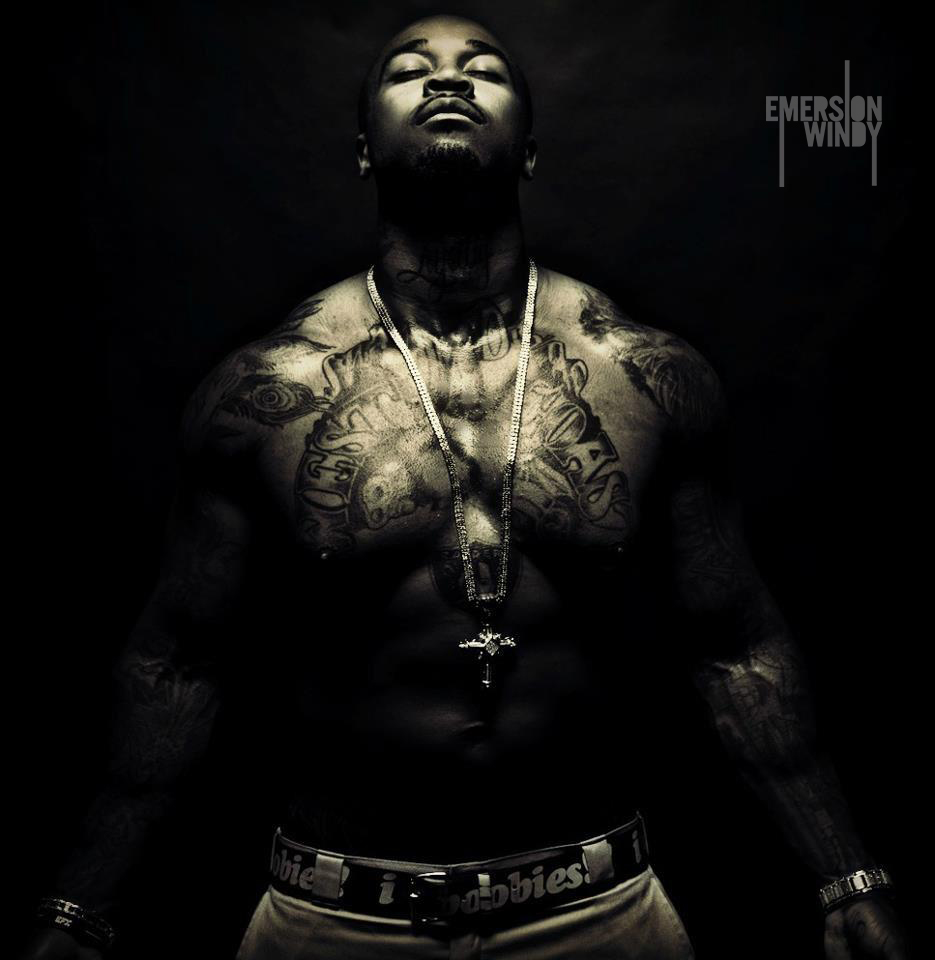
Windy photographed in 2014

In early 2014 Brandon Douglass aka DJ Trendsetter Sense, one of the founders of one of the most progressive DJ clique’s in hip hop—according to Allhiphop.com. The group known as the Aphiliates consists of DJ Trendsetter Sense, Gangsta Grillz creator, DJ Drama and newly named Def Jam VP - Don Cannon. DJ Trendsetter Sense reached out to Emerson to learn more about his movement and shortly thereafter, set up features with hip hop artists such as Lil Wayne, 2 Chainz, Pusha T, Raekwon and Birdman for Windy's debut project, Herojuana. On May 13, 2014 Windy released the album Herojuana on his label Pearl Harbor Entertainment with production credits that includes Timbaland, DJ Mustard, Mike Will Made It, Jazzfeezy, !llmind, Sonny Digital and The Nominees.

The album was available on Datpiff.com as a free download with the cover art depicting Emerson Windy in an Indian Chief's headdress. The first single "Peace Pipe" was premiered on WorldStarHipHop.com the same day which created controversy for some within the Native American community. The video shows Windy wearing a traditional Indian Chief headdress and using a peace pipe—two items considered sacred by the Native American Nation. After speaking with his Publicist, Shawnaleah Epps, a decision was made to address this with his fan base. Windy was invited to Z90.com studios by Radio Raymond T to make a response video to speak on the controversy and explain his motivation behind the video after which, Windy decided to pull the video down out of respect for Native Americans. The video went viral reaching over 14 million views in less than a week. Windy donated the headdress and peace pipe, and released new artwork for Herojuanaand was accepted by a Native Chief in acceptance of his apology.

== Current events ==
September 2014 Emerson released his second single "Black America" which touches on the issues and challenges facing black youth on a daily basis. The video was premiered exclusively on HipHopDX.com along with an extensive interview by industry writer Soren Baker. The record affected the community and was featured on Z90.com HotShot section. "Black America" reached over 2.6 million views on WorldStarHipHop.com. Emerson Windy was invited to perform the record and speak on a panel at the A3C Festival called "Raptivism Is... Transcending Hip Hop Beyond Rap". The panel discussion Takes a look at some of the ways hip hop is returning to its activist roots and how artists, producers and hip hop heads are impacting beyond music. Also part of the panel was Hip Hip-Hop Chess Federation’s Adisa Banjoko and RZA discussing "Living Like Kings" and "Hands Up Don’t Shoot: From Ferguson to A3C" put on by UnsignedHype.com.

On March 24, 2015 Emerson Windy released his third single "Poppin'" from Herojuana. The Oceanside, CA native visited his hometown for the video shoot and with Yellow One Productions, he was able to capture the essence of “The O”. Poppin' video premiered on WorldStarHipHop where it reached nearly 2.5 million views within 24 hours.

In Spring 2015 Emerson Windy released his first UK single remix "Come Get It" feat Pusha T and UK rapper P Money. Originally produced by Timbaland, SK!TZ added his own flavor, reflective of the grime scene popular in the UK. "Come Get It" on WorldStarHipHop.com reached over 3.1 million views. In addition

Emerson Windy was recently Core DJs certified by DJ YKCOR who remixed his debut project Herojuana and added Windy's single “KQing Of The World” as a bonus track.

== Philanthropy ==
In 2013 Emerson Windy went to New York City to record the video for "On My Way Downtown" to officially launch his #STOPHOMELESSNESS Campaign. DoSomething.org interviewed Emerson Windy to hear about the activities he and his late mother would take part in—one of them to raise awareness of the issue of homelessness and his desire to help others. Windy stays active in the community working with non profits like “Im My Own Blessing” in March 2014, over the course of two days, making sandwiches and distributing them to the hungry. Partnering with local radio station Magic 92.5, and Cruise For The Cause Emerson donated from his own collection a fully restored 1963 Chevrolet Impala which was auctioned off to a listener. The money raised was donated to The Emilio Nares Foundation who support families that have children with cancer. Emerson is currently working on his web series The CHRONICles of Weedman Windy which strives to educate and redefine the benefits cannabis offers with a release for mid 2015.

== Discography ==
=== Studio albums ===
- Herojuana (debut) (2013)
- The Emerson Windy Experience (2012) (unreleased)

=== Singles ===
- "KQing Of The World" (2015)
- "Come Get It" feat Pusha T & P Money (Remixed by S.K.I.T.Z Beatz) (2015)
- "Come Get It" feat Pusha T (Prod by Timbaland) (2015)
- "Poppin'" (2015)
- "Black America" (2014)
- "Money Up" feat 2 Chainz & Hofa Bang (2013)
- "Mr. Weedman" (2012)
- "My Best Friend" (2012)
- "Grenades" (2012)
