= British Academy Television Award for Best Soap and Continuing Drama =

Annual UK television award

- Country: United Kingdom
- Presented by: British Academy of Film and Television Arts
- First award: 1999
- Currently held by: EastEnders (2026)

Highlights
- Most wins: EastEnders (11)
- Website: http://www.bafta.org/

The British Academy Television Award for Best Soap and Continuing Drama is one of the major categories of the British Academy Television Awards (BAFTAs), the primary awards ceremony of the British television industry, presented by the British Academy of Film and Television Arts. Eligible drama series must be transmitted for at least 20 episodes a year. Only one episode of no more than an hour may be entered, and the episode selected must not be a special, as it must be fully representative of the series. The award was first given in 1999, for soap operas transmitted in 1998. Its title was changed from Best Soap to Best Continuing Drama in 2003, and to Best Soap and Continuing Drama in 2012. As of 2026, the award has been won by EastEnders eleven times, Coronation Street seven times, Casualty six times, Emmerdale three times, and The Bill and Holby City once each.

== Winners and nominees ==
=== 1990s ===
Year	Title	Recipient(s)	Production company	Broadcaster
1999	EastEnders	Matthew Robinson	BBC	BBC One
1999	Brookside	Phil Redmond	Mersey Television	Channel 4
1999	Hollyoaks	Phil Redmond, Jo Hallows	Mersey Television	Channel 4
1999	Coronation Street	Carolyn Reynolds, David Hanson	Granada Television	ITV1

=== 2000s ===
Year	Title	Recipient(s)	Production company	Broadcaster
2000	EastEnders	Matthew Robinson	BBC	BBC One
2000	Coronation Street	Jane Macnaught	Granada Television	ITV1
2000	Emmerdale	Keith Richardson, Kieran Roberts, Chris Thompson	Yorkshire Television	ITV1
2000	Brookside	Phil Redmond, Paul Marquess	Mersey Television	Channel 4
2001	Emmerdale	Kieran Roberts, Oliver Horsbrugh, Karin Young	Yorkshire Television	ITV1
2001	EastEnders		BBC	BBC One
2001	Coronation Street		Granada Television	ITV1
2001	Hollyoaks	Phil Redmond, Jo Hallows	Mersey Television	Channel 4
2002	EastEnders		BBC	BBC One
2002	Coronation Street		Granada Television	ITV1
2002	Doctors		BBC	BBC One
2002	Hollyoaks	Phil Redmond, Jo Hallows	Mersey Television	Channel 4
2003	Coronation Street	Carolyn Reynolds, Kieran Roberts	Granada Television	ITV1
2003	Doctors		BBC	BBC One
2003	EastEnders		BBC	BBC One
2003	Hollyoaks	Phil Redmond, Jo Hallows	Mersey Television	Channel 4
2004	Coronation Street	Carolyn Reynolds, Kieran Roberts	Granada Television	ITV1
2004	Casualty	Mal Young, Mervyn Watson	BBC	BBC One
2004	Holby City	Mal Young, Kathleen Hutchison	BBC	BBC One
2004	The Bill	Paul Marquess, Donna Wiffen, Jake Riddell	Talkback Thames	ITV1
2005	Coronation Street	Tony Wood, Ian Bevitt, John Fay	Granada Television	ITV1
2005	Doctors		BBC	BBC One
2005	Holby City		BBC	BBC One
2005	The Bill	Paul Marquess, Claire Phillips, Donna Wiffen	Talkback Thames	ITV1
2006	EastEnders		BBC	BBC One
2006	Coronation Street	Tony Wood, Tracey Rooney, Daran Little	ITV Productions	ITV1
2006	Casualty		BBC	BBC One
2006	Holby City		BBC	BBC One
2007	Casualty		BBC	BBC One
2007	Coronation Street	Stephen Russell, Tim O'Mara, Steve Frost, Kieran Roberts	ITV Productions	ITV1
2007	EastEnders		BBC	BBC One
2007	Emmerdale	Keith Richardson, Kathleen Beedles, Lindsay Williams, Piotr Szkopiak	ITV Productions	ITV1
2008	Holby City		BBC	BBC One
2008	The Bill	Johnathan Young, Tim Key, Maxwell Young, Robert Del Maestro	Talkback Thames	ITV1
2008	Emmerdale	Keith Richardson, Kathleen Beedles, John Anderson, Tim Dynevor	ITV Productions	ITV1
2008	EastEnders		BBC	BBC One
2009	The Bill		Talkback Thames	ITV1
2009	Casualty		BBC	BBC One
2009	EastEnders		BBC	BBC One
2009	Emmerdale		ITV Studios	ITV1

=== 2010s ===
Year	Title	Recipient(s)	Production company	Broadcaster
2010	EastEnders		BBC	BBC One
2010	Casualty		BBC	BBC One
2010	Coronation Street		ITV Studios	ITV1
2010	The Bill		Talkback Thames	ITV1
2011	EastEnders		BBC	BBC One
2011	Coronation Street		ITV Studios	ITV1
2011	Casualty		BBC	BBC One
2011	Waterloo Road	Sharon Hughff, Sharon Channer, Fraser MacDonald, Lis Steele	Shed Productions	BBC One
2012	Coronation Street		ITV Studios	ITV1
2012	EastEnders		BBC	BBC One
2012	Holby City		BBC	BBC One
2012	Shameless	Paul Abbott, George Faber, David Threlfall, Lawrence Till	Company Pictures	Channel 4
2013	EastEnders		BBC	BBC One
2013	Coronation Street		ITV Studios	ITV
2013	Emmerdale		ITV Studios	ITV
2013	Shameless		Company Pictures	Channel 4
2014	Coronation Street		ITV Studios	ITV
2014	Casualty		BBC	BBC One
2014	EastEnders		BBC	BBC One
2014	Holby City		BBC	BBC One
2015	Coronation Street		ITV Studios	ITV
2015	Casualty		BBC	BBC One
2015	EastEnders		BBC	BBC One
2015	Hollyoaks		Lime Pictures	Channel 4
2016	EastEnders		BBC	BBC One
2016	Coronation Street		ITV Studios	ITV
2016	Emmerdale		ITV Studios	ITV
2016	Holby City	Oliver Kent, Simon Harper, Kate Hall, Joe Ainsworth	BBC	BBC One
2017	Emmerdale		ITV Studios	ITV
2017	Casualty		BBC	BBC One
2017	EastEnders		BBC	BBC One
2017	Hollyoaks	Bryan Kirkwood, Emily Gascoyne, Vikki Tennant, Colette Chard	Lime Pictures	Channel 4
2018	Casualty		BBC	BBC One
2018	Coronation Street		ITV Studios	ITV
2018	Emmerdale		ITV Studios	ITV
2018	Hollyoaks	Bryan Kirkwood, Emily Gascoyne, Vikki Tennant, Colette Chard	Lime Pictures	Channel 4
2019	EastEnders		BBC	BBC One
2019	Coronation Street		ITV Studios	ITV
2019	Casualty		BBC	BBC One
2019	Hollyoaks	Bryan Kirkwood, Emily Gascoyne, Colette Chard, Kevin Rundle	Lime Pictures	Channel 4

=== 2020s ===
Year	Title	Recipient(s)	Production company	Broadcaster
2020	Emmerdale		ITV Studios	ITV
2020	Casualty		BBC	BBC One
2020	Holby City		BBC	BBC One
2020	Coronation Street		ITV Studios	ITV
2021	Casualty	Simon Harper, Loretta Preece, Sarah Beeson, Jenny Thompson	BBC Studios	BBC One
2021	Coronation Street		ITV Studios	ITV
2021	EastEnders	Jon Sen, Kate Oates, Sharon Batten, Liza Mellody	BBC Studios	BBC One
2021	Hollyoaks	Bryan Kirkwood, Hannah Sowden, Josie Day, Gary Sewell, Colette Chard	Lime Pictures	Channel 4
2022	Coronation Street		ITV Studios	ITV
2022	Casualty	Deborah Sathe, Loretta Preece, Debbie Biggins, Jenny Thompson, Sarah Beeson	BBC Studios	BBC One
2022	Holby City		BBC Studios	BBC One
2022	Emmerdale		ITV Studios	ITV
2023	Casualty		BBC Studios	BBC One
2023	Emmerdale		ITV Studios	ITV
2023	EastEnders		BBC Studios	BBC One
2024	Casualty		BBC Studios	BBC One
2024	Emmerdale		ITV Studios	ITV1
2024	EastEnders		BBC Studios	BBC One
2025	EastEnders		BBC Studios	BBC One
2025	Casualty		BBC Studios	BBC One
2025	Coronation Street		ITV Studios	ITV1
2026	EastEnders		BBC Studios	BBC One
2026	Casualty		BBC Studios	BBC One
2026	Coronation Street		ITV Studios	ITV1

- Note: The series that don't have recipients on the table had Production team credited as the recipients of the award or nomination.

== Eligible programmes ==
Series	Last win	Last nomination
Casualty	2024	2026
Coronation Street	2022	2026
EastEnders	2026	2026
Emmerdale	2020	2024
Hollyoaks	—N/a	2021
Waterloo Road	—N/a	2011

== Total awards by network ==
- BBC One – 17
- ITV/ITV1 – 11

== Programmes with multiple wins and nominations ==
=== Multiple wins ===
Series	Wins
EastEnders	11
Coronation Street	7
Casualty	5
Emmerdale	3

=== Multiple nominations ===
Series	Nominations
Coronation Street	23
EastEnders	23
Casualty	18
Emmerdale	12
Holby City	9
Hollyoaks	8
The Bill	5
Doctors	3
Brookside	2
Shameless	2
