= Youngers =

British comedy drama series

- Created by: Benjamin Kuffuor; Levi David Addai
- Written by: Levi David Addai; Benjamin Kuffuor; Mark Catley; Georgia Lester
- Directed by: Anthony Philipson
- Starring: Ade Oyefeso; Calvin Demba; Shavani Seth; Arinze Kene; Joivan Wade; Percelle Ascott; Dee Kartier; Little Simz; Michelle Ndlovu
- Composer: Aiden 'S.K.I.T.Z Beatz' Hogarth
- Country of origin: United Kingdom
- Original language: English
- No. of series: 2
- No. of episodes: 16

Production
- Executive producers: Luke Alkin; Kenton Allen
- Producer: Radford Neville
- Production locations: Peckham, United Kingdom
- Camera setup: Multi-camera setup
- Running time: 30 minutes
- Production company: Big Talk Productions

Original release
- Network: E4
- Release: 20 March 2013 – 25 June 2014

Youngers is a British comedy drama series created by Benjamin Kuffuor and Levi David Addai. It began airing on E4 on 20 March 2013. It is produced by Big Talk Productions. The series has been picked up for international distribution by BBC Worldwide.

== Premise ==
The series follows a group of south-east London teenagers aiming to become the next big thing on the urban music scene. It opens with Yemi (Ade Oyefeso) and Jay (Calvin Demba) on their way to school to collect their GCSE results. After collecting the results, Yemi finds out he has had straight A's, whilst Jay receives poor grades. Jay then receives a leaflet about a local music competition, and pays to go and perform at the competition. At the reception, a grumpy receptionist soon enlists them as 'youngers', on the performers sheet. They deliver an excellent performance, and slowly, rise to the top of the music charts. Yemi adds his secret-crush Davina to their group, who loves Jay. Getting managed by their good friend Ash, the Youngers slowly make their way to the top of the music charts in London, however, the higher they get, more problems emerge. Slowly, the group starts to fade away, as Jay and Davina get into a secret relationship to hide things from Yemi.

== Production and cast ==
The series was greenlit for an eight episode order in August 2012. Producer Luke Alkin said in an interview that the series is inspired by the mainstream success of British urban music, citing artists such as Dizzee Rascal and Tinie Tempah as models for the lead characters of Jay and Yemi. Well respected UK composer Aiden Hogarth aka S.K.I.T.Z Beatz was brought in to create the original soundtrack.

There was an open casting call in early 2012 for the lead roles of Jay and Yemi, where over 350 actors were seen. To audition, it was required that the actors have some rap or musical background. After Ade Oyefeso and Calvin Demba were added to the cast, the series was filmed between September and November in Peckham. The final cast was made up of predominantly new talent including YouTube act and Brit School graduates Mandem on the Wall.

== Broadcast ==
The series was declared a 'hit' after a 450,000 viewer turn out for the first episode. E4 have said, "Youngers has been a huge success, but we have to let time tell the tale from here, as the following episodes will have to be even better for it to continue." On 27 June 2013, Digital Spy reported that E4 had commissioned a second series of Youngers. The eight-episode series premiered on 7 May 2014, with Calvin Demba, Ade Oyefeso and Shavani Seth returning in their roles.

Series	Timeslot (GMT)	# Ep.	Premiered		Ended	Average Viewers
Series	Timeslot (GMT)	# Ep.	Date	Premiere Viewers	Date	Average Viewers
1	Wednesday 7:30 pm	8	20 March 2013	450,000	8 May 2013	463,000
2	Wednesday 7:30 pm	8	07 May 2014	—	25 June 2014	—

== Episodes ==
Series	Episodes	Originally released	
Series	Episodes	First released	Last released
1	8	20 March 2013	8 May 2013
2	8	7 May 2014	25 June 2014

Season 1

No.	Title	Original release date
1	"South's Finest – Part One"	20 March 2013
It is GCSE results day, and friends Yemi and Jay nervously make their way to school to find out what the future holds.
2	"South's Finest – Part Two"	27 March 2013
Jay and Yemi enter the world of Boxes nightclub, determined to win Mic Star. The competition does not seem as heavyweight as first expected, but the hostile crowd reaction lets the boys know that this will not be easy.
3	"For Man-dem Only"	3 April 2013
After the Boxes debacle, Jay attempts to get his phone back from Jodie, but she's not going to give it up easily.
4	"Enigma"	10 April 2013
Jay begins his first day working with his dad, which brings an opportunity that he believes will propel the Youngers into the big time.
5	"A to B and the Apology"	17 April 2013
Jay takes it upon himself (with a little help from Davina) to create a music video to make amends for Enigma. However, without Yemi, who is struggling to get to grips with his college work, he makes a mess of things.
6	"Money Mad"	24 April 2013
Davina has an idea to help boost the Youngers' profile and get more online hits for their music video.
7	"It's All About Love"	1 May 2013
Davina's school performance approaches, but she can not get Jay out of her head. Jay does his best to be loyal to Yemi, while Yemi takes the plunge and asks Davina out, but soon discovers the real reason for her rejection.
8	"United We Stand"	8 May 2013
Ashley lines the Youngers up as special guests at the Avengers Krew mixtape launch night concert. But unbeknown to the others, Yemi has already started work with AK, so Jay and Davina have a heart-to-heart. They are soon offered a record label.

Season 2

No.	Title	Original release date
1	"Divided Ain't Cool"	7 May 2014
Jay tries to work with a new producer on his first solo track, while Yemi struggles as the leader of his youth choir. With Davina out of the way can the two put the past behind them and move on?
2	"Boss Lady Business"	14 May 2014
Davina gets a job at the local gym but her patience is tested by her crazy boss. Ashley makes amends with the Youngers to secure a record deal.
3	"This Is Where The Magic Happens"	21 May 2014
The Youngers are on a deadline to produce a new track but are feeling the strain of working together again. Ashley comes face to face with a shady old friend who could be the answer to his problems.
4	"Professional Problems"	28 May 2014
The rivalry between Jay and MC Mar-Lon intensifies and threatens to mess up the band's first paid gig – along with the Youngers' big chance of finally getting signed.
5	"Links"	4 June 2014
Yemi chaperones the pastor's daughter around Peckham and has no idea what he's let himself in for. Mar-Lon and Davina enjoy their first date, but Jay is resentful.
6	"What Happened To Keeping It Real?"	11 June 2014
Ashley masterminds a new plan for success but gets in deeper with Benny to help him along. Bangs' track becomes an unexpected hit around town.
7	"Hotter Than The Sun"	18 June 2014
While Ashley appears to be solely focused on Bangs, whose track has gone big, Davina is devoting all her time to Mar-Lon. Yemi is totally caught up with Abena.
8	"Hook of Revelations"	25 June 2014
The Youngers, Bad Breeds and Bangs are due to perform at the opening party for Benny's studio. But Mar-Lon and Jay compete for Davina's affections and put each other at risk.
