= Calvin Demba =

British actor

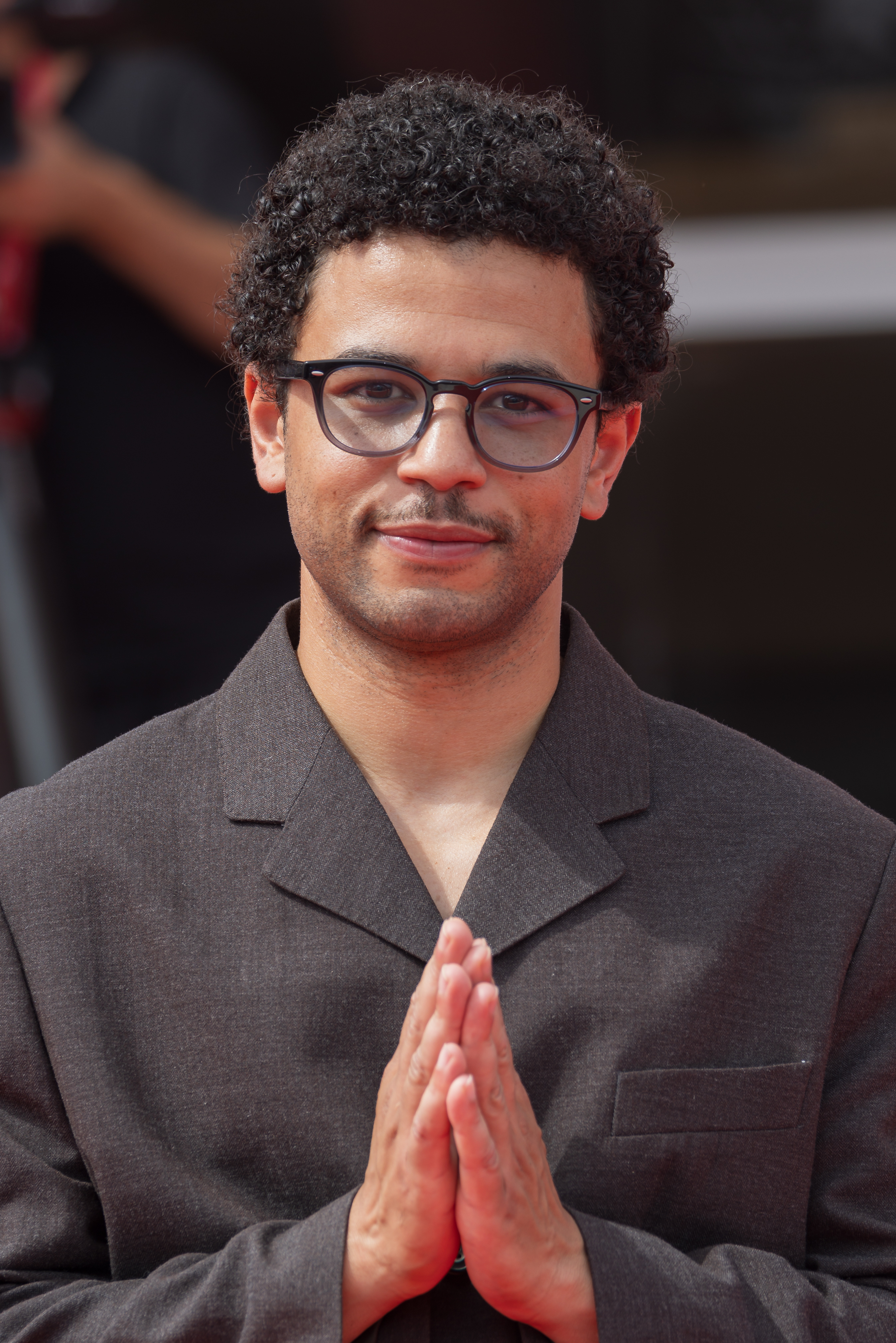
- Demba in 2025
- Born: Stepney, London, England
- Occupations: Actor, writer, director
- Years active: 2011–present
- Notable work: Supacell, Killed by My Debt, Kingsman: The Golden Circle

Calvin Arron A. Demba is an English actor, writer and director. He is known for his roles in the Channel 4 soap opera Hollyoaks (2011–2012), the E4 series Youngers (2013–2014), the BBC One drama Life (2020) and the Netflix series Supacell (2024–).

Demba made his directorial debut in 2022 with the BFI-backed short, BabyDolls – a spoken word film. His most recent short film, The Animals starred George MacKay and screened as part of the 70th London Film Festival.

== Early life and education ==
Calvin Arron A. Demba was born in Stepney, East London, and grew up in Bethnal Green. He is of Gambian and Scottish descent.

From the age of 17, Demba attended The Half Moon youth theatre in Limehouse, before signing with an acting agency in Hoxton.

== Career ==
Demba first came to prominence in 2011, when he was cast as Scott Sabeka in the Channel 4 soap Hollyoaks. Demba stayed in the role for a year, filming 82 episodes as Sabeka.

In 2013, Demba made his theatrical debut, in the play Routes, portraying Kola. The play was staged at the Royal Court Theatre in London.

From 2013 to 2014, Demba portrayed Jay in the E4 comedy-drama series Youngers. In an interview with The National Student, Demba shared, "I’m hoping shows like this will open up the doors for more young black actors and this will be good for that reason alone. It conveys young people in a positive way and as goal-orientated which is not always done. There are no drug references, no sex and not even any swearing. I feel like we’re going in the right direction with this because it shows we’re not all drug-taking people without hope. There are diamonds in the rough."

In 2015, Demba was nominated for the Evening Standard 'Emerging Talent' Award for his performance in Patrick Marber's The Red Lion at the National Theatre, London.

In 2020, Demba starred as Andy Okonkwo in the BBC drama Life, alongside Alison Steadman, Victoria Hamilton, and Adrian Lester. He also had a leading role in the Netflix superhero television drama series, Supacell, released in June 2024.

In 2022, Demba wrote and directed a short film, Babydolls, his directorial debut, and a project backed by the BFI. Demba was one of four writers honoured at the 2022 Film London Lodestars; the ceremony honours innovative creators and practitioners to watch. He returned to the role of director for 2026's The Animals, starring George MacKay, Eric Kofi Abrefa, Louisa Harland, and Nathalie Emmanuel. The short was also backed by the BFI, and screened at the 70th London Film Festival. Demba hopes to develop it into a feature-length film.

== Personal life ==
As of April 2023 Demba is in a relationship with Irish actress Louisa Harland.

== Credits ==
=== Film ===
Year	Title	Role	Notes
2012	Twenty8k	Inmate 1	
2015	London Road	Alec	
2015	Shakespeare on Death	The Speaker	Short film
2016	Brotherhood	Marshall	
2016	Rue Boy	Callum	Short film; also writer
2017	Nico, 1988	Alex	
2017	Kingsman: The Golden Circle	Brandon	
2017	The Vest	Macman	Short film
2018	Yardie	Sticks	
2018	Brixton Rock	Brenton Brown	Short film
2019	Mickey and the Bear	Wyatt Hughes	
2019	Last Christmas	Nathan	

=== Television ===
Year	Title	Role	Notes
2011	Fast Freddie, The Widow and Me	Terry	Television film
2011–2012	Hollyoaks	Scott Sabeka	Regular role; 82 episodes
2012	Casualty	Danny Beresford	Episode: The Blame Game
2013–2014	Youngers	Jay	16 episodes
2014	Sherlock	Isaac Whitney	Episode: His Last Vow
2014	Babylon	Jason Delgado	Episode: Maze Hill
2018	Killed by My Debt	Nat Rogers	Television film
2019	Urban Myths	Basquiat	Episode: Madonna and Basquiat
2020	Life	Andy Okonkwo	6 episodes
2021	Professor T.	Freddie Samson	Episode: The Dutiful Child
2022	Babydolls		Short film; Writer and director; directing debut
2023	The Rig	Baz	6 episodes; Prime Video
2024	Death in Paradise	Kurt Henderson	Episode: #13.8
2024–present	Supacell	Rodney	Regular role; 6 episodes Netflix
