= Omnibus (broadcast) =

An omnibus (or omnibus edition) is a compilation of several television or radio episodes into a single instalment. An omnibus is similar to, but distinct from, what is called a marathon in other countries; In an omnibus, individual episodes are edited together (with the first episode having its closing credits removed, the final episode having the opening credits removed, and each episode in between lacking any credits whatsoever) into a single programme, whereas in a marathon the episodes are aired separately but in sequence. The term has been most frequently used in the United Kingdom, though it has also been used in Australia, New Zealand and South Africa.

Brookside was the first television soap to have what was called an omnibus edition, in 1982; it continued until the series stopped showing the weekly prime time episodes in 2002 and the series moved to what was the omnibus slot to become extended episodes before ending a year later. EastEnders introduced the equivalent of an omnibus edition starting in 1985, but the term "omnibus" was not used until the 1990s.

== United Kingdom ==
In the United Kingdom, many soap operas have been regularly repeated in omnibus format; For example, both EastEnders and Hollyoaks air on weekends in an omnibus edition that compiles episodes previously aired during the week. Serials such as The Sarah Jane Adventures and Dead Set have been presented as complete storylines in this format.

Omnibus formatting has also been used on home video; for example, the first home video releases of Doctor Who from BBC Studios Distribution re-formatted each serial into a "feature-length adventure".

Programmes that are or have been transmitted in omnibus format in the UK include:

Television:

Programme	Years	Channel(s)
Brookside	1982–2002; 1995–2001	Channel 4 UK Living (classics)
Coronation Street	1989–2011; 2012–2023; 1996–2004	ITV; ITV2; Granada Plus (classics)
Doctor Who	1971–1977; 1992-2007; 2008; 2013; 2015	BBC One; UK Gold; Drama
EastEnders	1985–2015; 2016–2018; 1992–2001	BBC One; W UK Gold (classics)
Emmerdale	2000–present 2004–present	ITV2; ITV3
The Bill	1992–2001	UK Gold (classics)
Hollyoaks	1995–present 2001–present	Channel 4 (part of T4); E4
Home and Away	1999–2000; 1999–2002; 2001–2005; 2006–present 2015	ITV2; UK Living (classics); Channel 5; 5Star; Viva
Neighbours	1993–2001; 2008–2022; 2015	UK Gold (classics); 5STAR; Viva

Radio:

Programme	Years	Channel(s)
The Archers	1952–64; 1964–67; 1967-present	BBC Light Programme; BBC Home Service; BBC Radio 4

Internet:

- EastEnders: E20 (January 2010 on BBC Red Button and BBC iPlayer; April 2010 – October 2011 on BBC Three)

== Other countries ==
- The Bill (from 1987 to 1999 on ABC Television (Australia)
- Coronation Street on CBC Television (Canada)
- Shortland Street on TV2 (New Zealand)
- Isidingo on SABC 3 (South Africa)
- Generations on SABC 1 (South Africa)
- 7de Laan on SABC 2 (South Africa)

== United States ==
SoapNet in the United States also utilized the omnibus format for weekend re-airings of their major soap operas until its December 2013 demise; however, the term used in that case is as a marathon (the more common term for omnibus used by North American broadcasters) as all five weekday programmes aired by a soap per week were aired consecutively without editing them together. As all four current American soaps also carry their episodes either via Hulu or through network websites, omnibuses and marathons are no longer maintained for the format on any cable or broadcast network.

In the 2006–07 television season, the new network MyNetworkTV launched with four telenovelas, formatted with five episodes airing each weekday (two in the fall, two in the winter), then a 'highlights', or 'recap' omnibus episode on Saturday evenings. However, the entire debut format flopped, and by the time the network started its third cycle of telenovelas, they were reduced to weekly episodes, negating the need for an omnibus episode altogether.

== See also ==
- Rerun
