= Hull Blokes =

Writing Collective based in Kingston upon Hull

The Hull Blokes are a writing collective based in Kingston upon Hull, East Riding of Yorkshire, in the North East of England. They write and perform comedy and drama work, both for the stage and film.

== History ==
In May 2002, Gill Adams, a Hull-born playwright, used her column in the Hull Daily Mail to advertise for men to join a series of writing workshops funded by the Gulbenkian Foundation.

The project was actually part of the BBC's Northern Exposure ‘Writing in the Margins’ initiative, spearheaded by the Corporation's then creative director of new writing, Kate Rowland. Adams led the workshops for a year with exercises, discussions and readings, and it was she who coined the group's title. The term ‘Blokes’ was certainly being used by the time the group featured in Ariel in December 2002. In April 2003, the focus of the project – King of the Road, a six-part serial telling of the comings and goings of a local (fictional) taxi firm – received its first public reading in the Haworth Arms on Hull's Beverley Road.

Gill Adams’ contract with the BBC ended in the same month. The Blokes, however, had achieved a level of self-determination and success and decided to continue. They applied for and were awarded City Arts funding which enabled them to take part in Humber Mouth, the annual Hull Literature Festival. Their first ‘independent’ show was Counter Act, an evening of eight short plays performed at the Dorchester Hotel, Hull, on 13 November 2003. The group has continued, in subsequent years, to make regular contributions to Humber Mouth.

King of the Road was eventually broadcast on BBC Radio Humberside in March 2004.

== Present day ==
The Hull Blokes have continued to write and present comedy, drama and monologues not only for Humber Mouth but also as self-sufficient, self-supporting productions. Since 2005 their live performances have been staged at the Northern Academy of Performing Arts in Hull, and clips of their work, comprising extracts from the stage shows and stand-alone short films, have been made available on the internet.

Some of the writers are also performers and appear in their own and others’ pieces. Other personnel have been recruited for particular qualities or talents, and the need became apparent for a title which would include the whole company. Following the show of the same name, the term ‘Northern Conspiracy’ has been used informally since 2005 to refer to associates of the group whose contribution is unwritten but nevertheless crucial.

The Blokes are supported by the Arts Council, who have provided funding for the purchase of equipment used in the recording and projection of filmed pieces. The application necessitated the formalisation of the group's affairs, and a written constitution was adopted in February 2006.

== Current members ==
The Current members are: John Allbones, Wayne Dewsbury, Andy Hampel, Steve Kerry, Bernie Laverick, Gus Wilson, Sean Wilson and Steve 'Kippa' Wilson. The Wilsons are not related.

== Live shows to date ==
- Counter Act, 13 November 2003, Dorchester Hotel
- Play-ola, 1 July 2004, Dorchester Hotel
- Before the Fringe, 20–21 January 2005, The Ringside
- Never Mind The Ballcocks, 10 March 2005, The Ringside
- David Van Day's Hull Blokes Comedy Variety Show, 12 May 2005, The Ringside
- Tickling the Dragon's Tail, 22–23 June 2005, Dorchester Hotel
- Northern Conspiracy, 11–13 November 2005, Northern Academy of Performing Arts
- Love, 17–19 February 2006, Northern Academy of Performing Arts
- Hull Blokes On Air, 23–25 June 2006, Northern Academy of Performing Arts
- A Night of Comedy, Music, Films and Snowmen, 1–3 December 2006, Northern Academy of Performing Arts
- Tossa's in Spain, 22–24 June 2007, Northern Academy of Performing Arts.
- Hull Blokes Comedy Sketch Show, 2–4 November 2007, Northern Academy of Performing Arts.
- Confessions, 1–2 November 2008, The Haworth.

== Notes ==
In addition to several mentions in Gill Adams’ column in the Hull Daily Mail between 2002 and 2006, and various miscellaneous (and occasionally contentious) items of published correspondence, the group has featured in previews and reviews in the paper's news and entertainment pages (28/01/03, 15/03/04, 19/01/05, 21/06/05, 07/11/05, 17/02/06, 09/06/06, 22/06/06, 27/11/06, 0/06/07).
