= Jane Beale =

Fictional character from EastEnders

- EastEnders character
- Portrayed by: Laurie Brett
- Duration: 2004–2012, 2014–2017, 2024
- First appearance: Episode 2750; 21 June 2004
- Last appearance: Episode 6982; 19 September 2024
- Introduced by: Louise Berridge (2004); Dominic Treadwell-Collins (2014); Chris Clenshaw (2024)
- Spin-off appearances: EastEnders: E20 (2010)
- Crossover appearances: East Street (2010)
In-universe information
- Other names: Jane Clarke; Jane Collins
- Occupation: Caterer; Café manager; Businesswoman
- Family: Beale
- Father: Roger Clarke
- Mother: Linda Clarke
- Brothers: Christian Clarke
- Husband: David Collins (until 2004); Ian Beale (2007–2011, 2015–2020)
- Adoptive sons: Bobby Beale
- Stepsons: Steven Beale (adoptive); Peter Beale
- Stepdaughters: Lucy Beale; Cindy Williams (foster)

Jane Beale (also Collins) is a fictional character from the BBC soap opera EastEnders, played by Laurie Brett. She made her first appearance on 21 June 2004. Brett took maternity leave in 2011 and departed on 19 May. She returned on 8 November and departed again on 27 January 2012. Jane made a temporary return to the show on 6 January 2014 until 20 May of that year and permanently from 24 November 2014 to 23 October 2017.

Jane's storylines have included her relationship and later marriages to Ian Beale (Adam Woodyatt), an affair with Grant Mitchell (Ross Kemp), being accidentally shot by Ian's adoptive son Steven Beale (Aaron Sidwell) which results her desire to have a child of her own following a hysterectomy, a relationship with Masood Ahmed (Nitin Ganatra), her popular friendship with Tanya Branning (Jo Joyner), covering up her adopted son Bobby's (Eliot Carrington) role in the murder of her stepdaughter Lucy Beale (Hetti Bywater), being paralysed after being brutally attacked with a hockey stick by Bobby, caught up in the fire at Beale's restaurant, which was started by Steven before she was then left in the blaze by Max Branning (Jake Wood) and being forced by Max to leave Walford which led to a second departure.

Following the conclusion of her second stint, she made two voiceover appearances on 8 and 25 December 2017. The character made an unannounced return in the episode broadcast on 15 July 2024, and appeared until 17 July, before making a further appearance on 19 September of the same year to accommodate the exit of Bobby (Clay Milner Russell).

== Creation and development ==
Brett joined the cast of EastEnders in 2004 and was asked to dye her hair red and keep it short for the part. She also put on an English accent to disguise her natural Scottish accent. Brett described Jane as "warm, kind, caring and nurturing but she's not somebody that will be pushed around. She is quite feisty. She's a matriarch. Not as a dominant woman but she's definitely a matriarch, she's the centre of a family in the making for EastEnders."

In 2006, Jane has an affair with Grant Mitchell (Ross Kemp). The scenes began after writers saw chemistry between Kemp and Brett. Brett considered the storyline to be a turning point for the character as "All I did for the last year was say: 'What can I get you?' in the café." Jane was given a sexier look after a new producer came in and asked Brett to grow her hair and bleach out the red dye.

Jane marries Ian Beale (Adam Woodyatt), after co-habiting for around two years. Brett described Jane as "the straight man to Ian's buffoon. She's the other half who makes him whole." Speaking on the character's relationship with her husband, she likened herself to his mother, Kathy (Gillian Taylforth), stating: "if Jane doesn't work out for Ian, no one will! Perhaps because Ian is finally married to his mother. Jane is very Kathy-esque. They'd have got on really well, though I can't imagine Kathy would've been too impressed with Jane's affair with Grant – despite the fact she got through a few Mitchells herself!" She stated that she hoped Jane and Ian's marriage would be a lasting one, commenting that so far: "it's panned out brilliantly. There are millions of marriages like this one, involving a strong woman behind an incredibly weak man. But it's Ian's flaws that make everyone love him so much. The only time a character becomes boring is when they're two dimensional, and that's something you could never say about Ian. I can't imagine being anyone else's missus!"

On the Beale family as a whole, Brett commented: "we're probably the most normal family in Albert Square. The Beales are like the Trotters from Only Fools and Horses in many ways. They're salt-of-the-earth people who are trying to better themselves, so there's plenty of scope for drama and comedy. The writers certainly haven't run out of ideas for us yet – I haven't stopped working on big stories since I joined the show!"

=== Reintroduction (2014) ===
Jane returned to EastEnders in the 6 and 7 January 2014 episodes. Brett's return to filming was not announced by the show's producers so that viewers would be surprised. Brett found it easy to keep her return a secret, but said that the EastEnders press office and executive producer Dominic Treadwell-Collins probably found it more difficult. Brett said that she was "absolutely thrilled" with the reaction that she received, after the episode was broadcast, opining that it proved that Jane is a popular character. Brett's character returned to screens from late February to early May, and returned on 24 November 2014.

=== Second departure (2017) ===
On 23 October 2017, Jane made a previously unannounced departure from the show after being forced to leave Walford by Max Branning (Jake Wood). Of her departure, Brett commented: "I've loved every minute of playing Jane Beale. To return to EastEnders with such a huge storyline was an absolute gift. However, what I have known from the start is that with the soap gods watching us at all times, there is only so long before things go full circle. It's been hard keeping the secret but the storyline has been great to play out and I have loved every minute of it."

=== Second reintroduction (2024) ===
Jane made an unannounced return in July 2024. It was revealed on-screen that Ian had been meeting with Jane in secret, with her return scenes showing her first meeting with Cindy Beale (Michelle Collins).

== Storylines ==
=== 2004–2012 ===
Jane comes to Walford with a funfair, working the candyfloss stall. She argues with Ian Beale (Adam Woodyatt) but helps out when the funfair collapses. She moves to the Square and becomes friends with Ian. She reveals that her husband, David Collins (Dan Milne), is in a hospice with Huntington's disease. After he dies, Jane and Ian start dating and she moves in with him and his children, twins Lucy (Melissa Suffield) and Peter (Thomas Law), and Bobby (Alex Francis). When Jane and Grant Mitchell (Ross Kemp) intervene in a feud between Ian and Grant's brother Phil Mitchell (Steve McFadden), they end up kissing. Jane tells Grant she is not in love with him. After an argument with Ian, she has sex with Grant but stays with Ian, and Grant leaves Walford. Phil tells Ian about the affair so Ian proposes to Jane, quietly planning to humiliate her at the wedding. Jane learns this on their wedding day and disappears. Ian finds her and they fight but realise they love each other and want to be together. They marry in secret.

Ian's stepson Steven Beale (Aaron Sidwell), who has been living overseas, returns to Walford and takes Ian hostage, locking him in a flat. The family eventually learn where Ian is and try to rescue him, but Jane is shot in the process. She and Ian agree to have a baby when she recovers but Jane needs an emergency hysterectomy, leaving them devastated. Jane starts going to a stand-up comedy club, telling Ian that she is going to the gym. However, he knows she is lying so Tamwar Masood (Himesh Patel) takes him to the club where she is onstage. Amused initially, he is hurt by her jokes about him and their sex life. He gives her an ultimatum: give up her hobby or end their marriage. After she is accepted by a talent scout, she's shocked when Ian insists on being her agent. His interfering takes the fun out of her comedy career so she ends it.

After Ian invests in Masala Masood, the curry business run by Masood Ahmed (Nitin Ganatra) and his wife Zainab Masood (Nina Wadia), the Masoods and Beales go into business together, and Jane has a flirtatious relationship with Masood. When Ian refuses to consider the possibility of adopting a child, Jane turns to Masood for comfort and they kiss. Ian changes his mind but she knows it's only for her sake and leaves Walford, refusing to come home when Ian finds her and only returning when Bobby goes missing. Jane discovers her brother, Christian Clarke (John Partridge), is having an affair with Masood's son, Syed Masood (Marc Elliott), while acting as Syed's wedding planner. Zainab discovers this, and blames Jane for Christian coming to Walford. When Zainab hears Tamwar playing an audio recording of Ian having sex with Janine Butcher (Charlie Brooks), she plays it to Jane. Ian explains that Janine was blackmailing him and admits he stole Archie Mitchell's (Larry Lamb) laptop on the day he was murdered to retrieve the recording. Ian is arrested when Janine implicates Ian in Archie's death, but the charges are dropped. This damages Jane's chances of adopting.

Jane learns that Lucy is pregnant and suggests Lucy consider an abortion but Lucy wants Jane and Ian to adopt the baby. Jane agrees but Ian refuses and blames Jane for taking advantage of Lucy. Ian convinces Lucy to have an abortion and arranges it, then tells Jane that Lucy has miscarried. Fearing that Jane will learn the truth, Ian persuades her to visit her mother, Linda Clarke (Lynda Baron), in Florida. Jane is suspicious but Lucy convinces her to go. That night, Masood reminds her of their kiss and asks if he can go with her, but she goes alone as Masood stays in Walford after Syed attempts suicide. When Jane returns, the family learn that there are inconsistencies in Lucy and Peter's exam results and the papers will be investigated. Lucy denies cheating but later admits that she did. When Jane tells Lucy's friend Zsa Zsa Carter (Emer Kenny) that she is upset about Lucy's lies, Zsa Zsa assumes Jane is talking about the abortion and tells her about it. Jane asks Lucy to promise her that she is not hiding anything else and she does, but Jane learns that Ian knew about the abortion and that Lucy planned to cheat on her exam, so she decides to leave once she has what she feels she is owed. She opens another bank account and plans to transfer funds secretly before leaving, telling Ian that she no longer wants to adopt, but Ian suggests that she adopt Bobby and she agrees, as she can fight for access to him. Jane tells Christian about the abortion and he urges her to leave Ian, offering to help.

Kim Fox (Tameka Empson) brings Ian a letter from the bank about Jane's secret account. He asks Jane about it and she says she's been saving for a holiday and then has to book one, but suspicious Ian watches her every move. Jane discovers that Ian plans to buy the local Indian restaurant, the Argee Bhajee, without consulting her. Jane angrily tells friends that she no longer loves Ian, unaware that he has overheard. Ian attempts to woo Jane by cooking for her and offering the Argee Bhajee after her, admitting that he overheard what she said at Zainab's house. Jane then reveals that she knows about Lucy's abortion and is sick of his lies. She meets Masood and the pair console each other about their respective partners. They go to a hotel to have sex, but change their minds and decide to remain friends. When Jane returns home, she confesses to Ian and they reconcile.

Ian asks Jane to renew their wedding vows and she agrees. Days later, Ian admits to having an affair with Glenda Mitchell (Glynis Barber). He hopes she can forgive him but she cannot; they end their relationship but continue to live together, with Ian determined to win her back. She is horrified when Greg Jessop (Stefan Booth) asks Ian to be best man at his wedding to Jane's best friend Tanya Branning (Jo Joyner). During Tanya's hen night, Jane and Tanya get drunk and Tanya accuses Jane of being jealous, so Jane refuses to be Tanya's matron of honour. Returning home, Jane finds Greg bringing Ian home and she goes to kiss Greg, who pushes her away. Filled with guilt, Jane admits what she did to Tanya and they reconcile. Jane and Ian's relationship deteriorates when she meets a man named Martin (Alasdair Harvey) at a pub quiz. They have a brief affair; she ends it, but Ian tries to make Jane jealous by hiring an escort named Jeanette (Georgia Reece). Jane learns that she is an escort and mocks Ian; he calls Jane a prostitute disguised as a wife. She then vows to take everything she can in their divorce. Jane tells Masood she is in love with him and asks him to leave Zainab, but he refuses, telling her he loves her but does not want a divorce. Jane wins the café in her divorce from Ian. Bobby is upset by their arguments, and Jane realises she must leave Walford for his sake, so there are no more arguments. She promises to see Bobby regularly, and leaves after removing her wedding ring. Ian and Jane's divorce is later finalised.

When Jane returns six months later after Bobby visits her, she's shocked to learn that Ian is engaged to Mandy Salter (Nicola Stapleton) and that Masood and Zainab have split. Masood tells Jane that he cannot just be friends with her and they begin a romantic relationship. Masood and Jane go to dinner at Ian and Mandy's house and Ian asks how their relationship can develop if Jane is not a Muslim, so she tells Ian that she will convert, surprising Masood. Masood says she need not convert, so she is relieved. She sees Masood kissing Zainab and tells Zainab's new partner Yusef Khan (Ace Bhatti), and her relationship with Masood ends, though they stay friends. As Tanya has cervical cancer, Jane helps organise a function to raise money for cancer charities. At the event, Jane's former cuisine tutor Gethin Williams (Bradley Freegard) arrives. He is impressed with Jane's catering and asks her to interview for a job at his new restaurant. Jane is reluctant but Tanya sets it up regardless, telling Jane the next day and persuades her to go. She is offered the job, but it is in Cardiff, about 150 miles away. She accepts the job but Tanya assumes she has decided to stay in Walford and is horrified when Masood reveals the truth. Tanya is upset and says that Jane is no longer her friend. Jane is tempted to stay when Ian tells her that his half-brother Ben Mitchell (Joshua Pascoe) needs her but Christian convinces her to go, telling her not to give up on her dreams. As she and Christian are leaving, Tanya runs out of her house, and the two reconcile. She leaves and joyfully exclaims that she can now be whoever she wants.

=== 2014–2017 ===
Worried about Ian's behaviour, Peter (now Ben Hardy) calls Jane. She arrives at their house just as Ian is about to propose to his current fiancée, Jane's friend Denise Fox (Diane Parish). Ian is shocked and Jane and Denise feel awkward with each other. Ian and Jane have a heart-to-heart and Ian breaks down, saying that the pressure of his life is overwhelming. She encourages him to stay strong and advises Peter to talk to Denise about it. The next month, Jane returns to watch Bobby compete in a school spelling competition, lodges with Masood, and agrees to buy into Ian's restaurant. Misinterpreting her actions, Masood kisses Jane, but she rebuffs him. Bonding with Jane over past experiences, Ian kisses her, but she flees the house in humiliation, then is further appalled when Max Branning (Jake Wood) tries to seduce her. Jane makes clear to Ian that they are only friends but agrees to keep the truth from Denise. Masood's daughter Shabnam Masood (Rakhee Thakrar) dislikes Jane and Masood's closeness and plots to push Jane closer to Ian, but Denise is trying to push Jane and Masood closer together, and they eventually become a couple.

Jane is devastated when Lucy (now played by Hetti Bywater) is murdered (see Who Killed Lucy Beale?). Jane and Ian grieve together and have sex. This makes Ian hope they will reunite, but Jane immediately regrets it. When she tells Ian it was a mistake, he takes his anger out on Bobby (now played by Rory Stroud), and Jane breaks up with Masood and leaves with Bobby so Ian can grieve properly. Jane and Bobby stay with Christian, return for Lucy's funeral, and leave again when Jane realises that Ian needs more time alone.

Jane returns in November with the news that Bobby (now played by Eliot Carrington) is missing. Masood finds him asleep on Walford Common near where Lucy's body was found. When he is returned home it is apparent that he has been trying to solve the murder and wants to live in Walford. Jane agrees that Bobby needs his father and finds them a flat. Denise digs up Lucy's missing purse and phone in Patrick's allotment and Jane convinces Ian not to hand them in to the police. Denise is angry when she finds out Ian had sex with Jane the day after Lucy's death. Jane reunites Ian and Peter when they fall out after Ian discovers that Peter was sourcing Lucy's drugs for her, and later she decides to stay at the Beale house. She takes Lucy's phone and purse and hides them under a loose floorboard without telling Ian. Jane kisses Ian and regrets it, but later realises she loves him and they kiss again under the mistletoe. Jane does not want everyone to know about their relationship, but Alfie Moon (Shane Richie) has already found out and the news quickly spreads across the Square. When Jane finds out, she tells Ian that their relationship will not work, but after a discussion with Alfie, she changes her mind and proposes to Ian, who accepts. They plan their wedding for February. Jane is upset when her parents decline her invitation, disapproving of her remarrying Ian, but Sonia Fowler (Natalie Cassidy) supports her and she makes her matron of honour. On the day of the wedding, Jane receives a card from Lauren Branning (Jacqueline Jossa), revealing she knows that Lucy was killed at home. Visibly disturbed, she flees her wedding reception and is confronted by Peter, who also has discovered that Lucy died in the house. Ian realises Jane is lying and accuses her of killing Lucy; initially, she confesses, but Ian sees through her and realises Bobby is the real culprit. Jane covered for Bobby by taking Lucy's body and putting it in the common, then convinced Bobby that he didn't kill his sister; that is why they left Walford soon after the murder. Ian forgives Jane and, with the twins' maternal half-sister Cindy Williams (Mimi Keene), they agree that Bobby can never find out. Jane is devastated when Cindy stops her and Ian adopting Beth.

The Beales discover the police have a new suspect for Lucy's murder: Ben (now played by Harry Reid). Jane brings Lucy's effects up from under the floorboards, telling Ian she kept them as security, and she is seemingly happy to allow Ben to take the blame. Ian tells her to put the items back; she does so but they go missing, as Bobby has overheard the conversation, and he takes them to the police station. Phil prevents Bobby from turning in the evidence but it is clear that Jane is not coping, as she begins to behave erratically, suggests that the Beales flee Walford and ultimately confesses the truth to family friend Sharon Mitchell (Letitia Dean), who has found out after watching Cindy's video message meant for Bobby. Ian pleads with Sharon and she agrees not to tell the truth. Max is arrested and charged for Lucy's murder, leaving Jane racked with guilt. Ian and Bobby leave Walford on the eve of Max's trial, without telling Jane, who is distraught. Seeing Sharon comforting Jane, Phil works out that Jane knows Max is innocent, and confronts her. She admits she is covering for Bobby, and he decides to keep quiet, as Jane promises that she will keep Ben well out of this. She meets with Max's lawyer Marcus Christie (Stephen Churchett) and together they fabricate an alibi for Max on the night Lucy was killed, as she claims she had sex with him after turning to him for advice about Lucy. However, both the prosecution and her neighbours, including Max's sister Carol Jackson (Lindsey Coulson), are sceptical of her story.

When Max is convicted of the murder, the Beales struggle to move on and Ian attempts to commit suicide. Jane stops him in time but both are stunned when Ian's mother Kathy Sullivan (Gillian Taylforth) turns up in Walford after being believed to be dead for ten years. However, Jane grows close to Kathy, but is furious when Ian tells her that Bobby killed Lucy. Ian and Jane decide to move Bobby into Lucy's old bedroom, and Kathy into Bobby's, which infuriates him, especially when the rooms are swapped without his knowledge. Jane catches Bobby trying swap them back, and a physical scuffle ensues, which results in Bobby pushing Jane down the stairs. Jane tells Kathy that she slipped, but Bobby tells Kathy the truth, and Kathy asks Jane to think about Bobby's anger management problems. Jane refuses to admit he needs help, until he smashes a plate in the café when she refuses to get him a new bicycle for Christmas, so tells Kathy that she thinks there is something wrong with him. Ian decides sending Bobby to an expensive boarding school will solve Bobby's anger problems. Ian decides to sell his restaurant to pay for it, but there are protests when he decides to sell to a supermarket chain, causing Ian to change his mind. Bobby overhears Jane telling Sharon that she is wary of telling Bobby that he will have to leave the school, so in anger he damages her car with his hockey stick. The next day, Jane sees Bobby packing a bag and he says he knows what she has done and is returning to the school. She drags him back, and as she tries to phone Ian, Bobby attacks her, hitting her across the head with the hockey stick. When she falls, he strikes her two more times, leaving her seriously injured. Paramedics reveal Jane has head trauma and spinal injuries and, although Ian initially tries to protect Bobby, he accompanies Jane in the ambulance, denying Bobby access. In the ambulance, Jane enters critical condition when her spinal injury restricts her ability to breathe, requiring anaesthetics and spinal surgeons upon arrival at the hospital. While she remains in a coma at the hospital, consultants advise her brother Christian and mother Linda upon their arrival that Jane may never walk again. She wakes up, and initially struggles to speak and has lost most of the feeling in her hands and feet. Jane tells Linda that everything that has happened is her own fault, and, after discovering that Bobby has been charged with killing Lucy and Steven has returned, she tells Ian that she is the reason he has lost his family and tells him their relationship is over as the Beale family is better off without her. However, Ian manages to convince her otherwise. Jane decides to continue her recovery at home, and Ian has the downstairs of the house refurbished to aid this. Jane begins to recover but feels isolated.

When Grant returns briefly, Jane feels normal when at first he does not realise she is paralysed. She sees an incomplete online credit card application in Lucy's name and confronts Steven; he realises it was Ian and admits to it though later Ian admits the truth to Jane. Jane grows frustrated when Ian avoids spending time with her, so she tells Ian that she wants to be a normal couple again and wants to visit Bobby but Ian says Bobby does not want any visitors. When Lauren gives Jane a makeover, Ian compliments her. She starts to leave the house in her wheelchair and Jane has a good day with friends until she has incontinence and is humiliated; at home, Ian leaves the room when Jane asks him to sit with her. Jane thinks Steven is making excuses not to let her use the restaurant's laptop. Sharon has an idea so Jane can answer the telephone at the restaurant but Steven asks Jane to work in the kitchen as the restaurant is getting busy so Jane accuses him of not wanting a wheelchair in the restaurant which he denies, but Jane leaves. When Jane's paralysis improves that she is able to use a laptop properly, Lauren and Steven come up with a plan to distract her from looking at the restaurant's accounts. When she finally sees them, she realises payments are being made to a non-existent company so tells Sharon that it can only be Ian or Steven but she worries about confronting the wrong person. Jane eventually finds out that it is Steven but promises to not say anything when Steven says he did it to help Peter out of debts. Masood helps Jane to walk before he leaves Walford. Jane later admits to Stacey that she feels that Ian no longer finds her attractive. However, Ian learns of this and kisses her. When Max returns, Lauren arranges to meet him in the pub and invites Jane and Ian, but Ian tells Jane they need to leave because Max left Ian a note saying he would never forget what they did, however, Jane convinces him to meet Max. They both apologise to Max and he claims to understand their motivation to protect their child and says he wants to move on, shaking both their hands and buying them a drink.

By February 2017, Jane is able to push her own wheelchair. However, she is told by doctors that her physiotherapy is being withdrawn but that she can have private physiotherapy if she wants it. When Ian is told he is at risk of developing type-2 diabetes, Jane vows to help him lose weight. When Ian's fish and chip shop is destroyed, he decides to sell it so he can spend more time with Jane.

By May 2017, Jane is able to stand up and has crutches but still uses the wheelchair. In September, Jane discovers Steven's lie about his brain tumour, Steven's affair with Abi Branning (Lorna Fitzgerald), and Max's revenge plan. As Jane confronts Max, a gas explosion destroys Walford in Bloom. Max leaves Jane at the restaurant, but, Jane having told Max she knows his scheme, he orders Steven to kill Jane. Steven arrives and confronts Jane. Jane tries to talk Steven round but he is disbelieving about Abi expecting his child. Steven turns increasingly nasty on Jane, leaving her helpless on the floor and goes through with setting fire to Beales. Later Steven has a change of heart and refuses to kill Jane. Max violently shoves Steven to a corner of a kitchen counter leaving him badly injured. Max confronts Jane about his revenge on all Walford residents. Jane pleads with Max not to go through with his plans, however he proceeds to take the fire blanket, leaving Jane to burn to death. Jane survives and is taken to hospital, although Steven later dies from his injuries. Jane is left in a coma for several weeks afterwards, and upon waking up she is threatened by Max to stay quiet. Max eventually orders her to leave Walford, and although she and Ian make plans to leave, Max later orders her to leave alone, threatening Bobby if she doesn't comply. Jane says her goodbye but couldn't tell anybody about Max because he was watching her move every time. Jane leaves Walford in a taxi, leaving Ian a voicemail telling him she will ring him later. When she doesn't phone, Ian fears that she is missing, but is talked out of reporting it by Max, who then leaves her another message warning her to not contact Ian again. In a last attempt to oust Max, Jane sends a voicemail to her friend Stacey Fowler (Lacey Turner) warning her about Max, unaware that her phone is now in the possession of Bernadette Taylor (Clair Norris) after her younger brother Riley Taylor (Tom Jacobs) impulsively stole it for her. Riley and his brother Chatham (Alfie Jacobs) later listen to a different voicemail from Jane, which begs Stacey not to repeat the details of her first voicemail to anyone.

Stacey gets her phone back on Christmas Day 2017 and Max deletes most of the voicemails before she can hear them. However, Tanya arrives and reveals that Jane has told her everything, revealing the truth about Max's role in Steven's death and Jane's departure to Stacey and an eavesdropping Abi and Stacey's husband Martin Fowler (James Bye). Upon arriving back at Ian's house, Abi tells Lauren, Ian and Kathy about Max's role in Steven's death, and Kathy tells Phil; leaving all disgusted with Max's actions. In 2020, Jane files for divorce, leaving Ian free to marry his childhood friend Sharon.

=== 2024 ===
A few years prior, Ian reunites with Cindy Beale (Michelle Collins), Steven, Lucy and Peter's mother, who had faked her death and had been hiding in witness protection for the past 25 years. Suspecting that Ian is having an affair, Cindy follows him to a house in the Cotswolds and finds him meeting with Jane in secret. Jane wishes to reconnect with Bobby, whom she has been estranged with since his release from prison in 2019. Peter (Thomas Law again) brings Bobby (now Clay Milner Russell) to see Jane, but he is resistant to their reconciliation, admitting he does not understand why she covered up Lucy's death to protect him and still feels guilty about attacking her. Cindy and Jane clash over Jane's actions in covering up Lucy's death, but they briefly make peace when Jane tells Cindy that Steven had shot her leading to her infertility, hence why she covered up Lucy's death because Bobby is the only child she will ever have. After Ian argues with Cindy, he kisses Jane, but she turns him down. Jane and Bobby bond again and she gives him an Ayatul Kursi bracelet as a birthday gift before he leaves. Jane later has a phone conversation with Masood where it is revealed that they are dating again. A few months later, Bobby experiences a traumatic episode arising from his girlfriend Anna Knight (Molly Rainford) falling pregnant and having an abortion. Bobby decides to live with Jane, who returns to Walford to pick up Bobby and take him to live with her in the Cotswolds.

== Other appearances ==
Jane also made some cameo appearances in the Internet spin-off series EastEnders: E20. In Series 1 Episode 2, Jane is working in the café where Fatboy (Ricky Norwood) attempts to chat her up. In Series 2 Episode 3, Jane is seen briefly talking to a girl outside the café and in Episode 8 she confronts Asher Levi (Heshima Thompson) about some trainers he sold to Peter. He says he does not give refunds so she snatches his wallet and takes some money out but he snatches it back. Jane tells two police officers that Asher is a thief and they chase after him. In Episode 10, Asher says he will refund Jane and when his brother Sol Levi (Tosin Cole) needs him, she lets him go.

In November 2010, Jane appeared in the EastEnders and Coronation Street crossover mini-episode, East Street for Children in Need. In the episode, various characters from EastEnders visited Weatherfield, while characters from Coronation Street went to Walford.

== Reception ==
In a review of the first decade of the 21st century in soaps, Ruth Deller of lowculture.co.uk wrote that Jane was "one of the best new characters in soap this decade; really believable, sensitive, [and] sensible, [...] she gives EastEnders a bit of heart, which is rare indeed." Deller also expressed her belief that Jane transformed the Beale family into one of the strongest families of the late 2000s, further stating: "A genuinely nice character whom you could imagine being your mate, once they got that nonsense with Grant out of the way, she's been a real asset to the soap." Kevin O'Sullivan of the Sunday Mirror said that Jane was an EastEnders veteran who had a "seismic departure" as she "checked out of soapland's asylum in characteristically crazy style". When Jane departed she said "from now on I can be whoever I want" – in response O'Sullivan quipped "but you'll always be the loser who married Ian Beale". Virgin Media called 2009 the "Good year" for Jane because she left her ex-husband Ian, "the most boring and selfish man in Walford."

Brett was nominated for "Best Actress" at The British Soap Awards 2015, but lost to co-star, Kellie Bright, who portrays Linda Carter. However, she won "Best On-screen Partnership" alongside Woodyatt. In May 2017, Laura-Jayne Tyler from Inside Soap wrote that she was "elated" for Jane and Ian when Jane started walking again, calling the scene "beautifully acted" by Brett and Woodyatt.

== See also ==
- List of EastEnders: E20 characters
- "Who Killed Lucy Beale?"
