= Billy Mitchell (EastEnders) =

Fictional character from EastEnders

- EastEnders character
- Perry Fenwick as Billy Mitchell (2018)
- Portrayed by: Perry Fenwick; George Greenland (2022 flashback)
- Duration: 1998–present
- First appearance: Episode 1689; 2 November 1998
- Introduced by: Matthew Robinson
- Spin-off appearances: EastEnders: E20 (2010); Billy's Olympic Nightmare (2012); The Walford Apprentice (2012); The Ghosts of Ian Beale (2014)
In-universe information
- Occupation: Barman; Business manager; Market trader; Personal assistant; Chip shop assistant; Undertaker; Postman
- Family: Mitchell
- Father: Stevie Mitchell
- Mother: Val Mitchell
- Stepmother: Connie Mitchell
- Brothers: Charlie Mitchell
- Half-brothers: Teddy Mitchell
- Wife: Little Mo Morgan (2002–2006); Honey Edwards (2006–2008, 2025–present)
- Sons: Dan Pearce; Will Mitchell
- Daughters: Janet Mitchell
- Adoptive sons: Jay Brown (foster)
- Stepsons: Freddie Slater
- Granddaughters: Lola Pearce
- Uncles: Ted Mitchell
- Aunts: Renee Mitchell
- Nephews: Jamie Mitchell; Harry Mitchell; Barney Mitchell (adoptive)
- Other relatives: Lexi Pearce; Archie Mitchell; Ronnie Mitchell; Roxy Mitchell; Amy Mitchell; Eric Mitchell; Phil Mitchell; Ben Mitchell; Louise Mitchell; Grant Mitchell; Sam Mitchell

Billy Mitchell is a fictional character from the BBC soap opera EastEnders, played by Perry Fenwick, who made his first appearance on 2 November 1998. Billy was originally introduced by executive producer Matthew Robinson as a guest character, facilitating the introduction of Jamie Mitchell (Jack Ryder) to the show. Early on, Billy was Jamie's abusive uncle and guardian - which results in Jamie being taken away from Billy by his relative, Phil Mitchell (Steve McFadden). Billy was then brought back to the serial on 2 August 1999 and Fenwick was offered a longer-term contract, and Billy ended up becoming a regular character. Frequently portrayed as a small-time criminal, Billy is a luckless resident of Albert Square who often struggles financially. His most prominent storylines include two failed marriages with Little Mo Mitchell (Kacey Ainsworth) and Honey Mitchell (Emma Barton) and having a daughter, Janet Mitchell (Grace) born with Down syndrome. Fenwick filmed his 1,000th episode on 6 August 2010, and later his 2,000th on 24 September 2022.

Billy's other major story lines have seen him involved in criminal activities with both Phil and his brother Grant Mitchell (Ross Kemp); working for Steve Owen (Martin Kemp); and being blackmailed by Dan Sullivan (Craig Fairbrass) to gain leverage against Steve and Phil, leading to Dan kidnapping Mel Owen (Tamzin Outhwaite); his complicated relationship with Janine Butcher (Charlie Brooks); marrying Little Mo after she overcomes her abusive husband Trevor Morgan (Alex Ferns); a subsequent incident where Little Mo gets raped by Graham Foster (Alex McSweeney) and struggling to cope with raising their son Freddie; a feud with Andy Hunter (Michael Higgs) and attempting with Minty Peterson (Cliff Parisi) to stop Andy from marrying Phil and Grant's sister, Sam Mitchell (Kim Medcalf); getting employed by Johnny Allen (Billy Murray); having a close friendship with Jase Dyer (Stephen Lord) before witnessing the latter's brutal death at the hands of his gang boss Terry Bates (Nicholas Ball); becoming the guardian of Jase's son Jay Brown (Jamie Borthwick) up to the point of becoming his surrogate father; starting a short-lived romance with Jean Slater (Gillian Wright); reuniting with his former girlfriend Julie Perkins (Cathy Murphy) and discovering that their deceased son had a daughter Lola Pearce (Danielle Harold); and developing a romantic obsession with Lucy Beale (Hetti Bywater). He later reunites with Honey, becomes the manager of a funeral parlour from which he is later sacked; sleeps with Tina Carter (Luisa Bradshaw-White) which ends his relationship with Honey; a relationship with Karen Taylor (Lorraine Stanley), feuding with Jay over his relationship with Honey who he reconciles with after she splits with Jay; struggling to deal with Lola's brain tumour and death; reuniting with his estranged father, Stevie Mitchell (Alan Ford) discovering that he has a half-brother, Teddy Mitchell (Roland Manookian) and re-marrying Honey during the show's 40th anniversary episodes.

== Creation ==
The character Billy Mitchell was introduced by executive producer Matthew Robinson as a guest character in November 1998, used as part of a storyline to introduce Billy's nephew, Jamie, (Jack Ryder) to the regular cast. In the storyline, Billy was caught being abusive to Jamie and he was subsequently taken in by Billy's cousin Phil Mitchell (Steve McFadden). The character was only intended to appear for four episodes; however, Perry Fenwick revealed in 2006 that the role was extended by "coincidence and chance": "I was offered four episodes and here I am, about 800 later. [...] Ross Kemp (Grant) said that he was leaving, and there was a gap in the Mitchell family, so they brought me back to do stuff towards his leaving. After that they offered me a year." Billy was reintroduced in 1999, making recurring appearances. He was involved in the leaving storyline of Grant Mitchell in October 1999, before returning later in the year as a regular character.

== Development ==
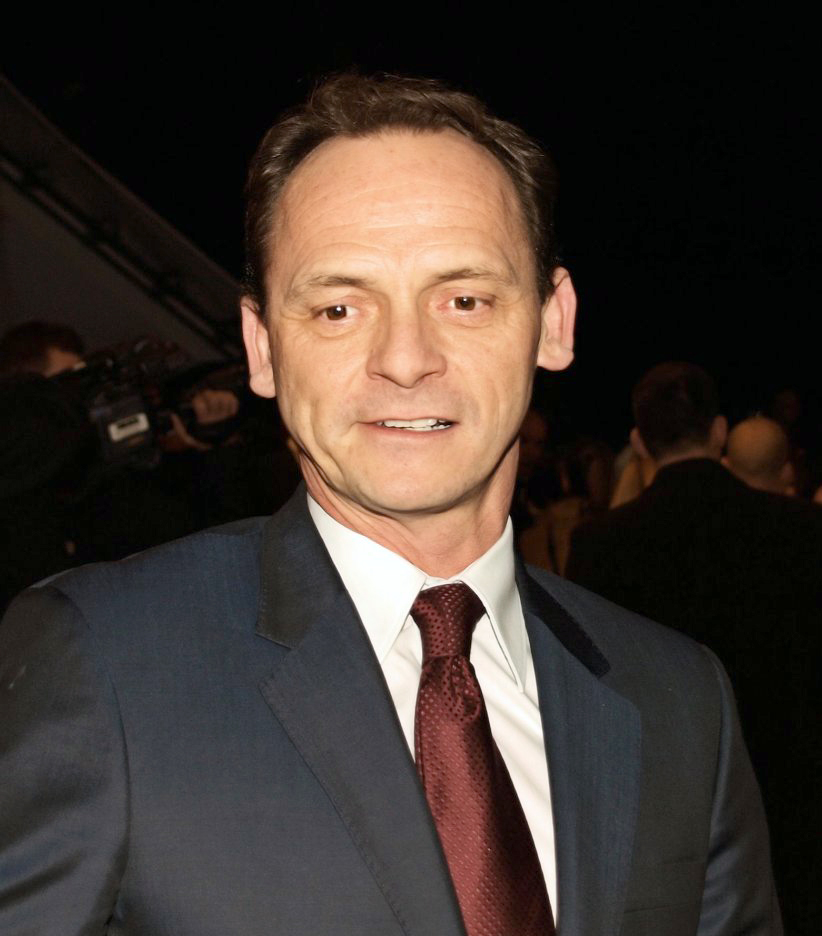
Perry Fenwick portrays Billy Mitchell.

=== Personality ===
When Billy was first introduced, he was depicted as a "runt of a man who's a catalyst for trouble." Kate Lock, author of EastEnders Who's Who, has noted that the character was something of an outcast to the rest of the Mitchell clan, commenting, "none of the other Mitchells likes to think of him as 'family' [..] Billy is held in great contempt by the Mitchell [brothers], who regard him as a lower lifeform than a worm".

It has been noted that when Billy was first introduced, he was a "nasty piece of work". However, Billy underwent a personality change circa 2002 and "became good". It was revealed that Bill's nasty streak was a result of him having been abused and bullied while growing up in a children's home. From then on, Billy was depicted as "clownish and a bit of a loser [...] a born romantic with a kind nature and a big heart". According to actor Perry Fenwick, it is doubtful that he would have continued with the role if Billy had not "mended his wicked ways". Billy was involved in an abuse storyline with his nephew, Jamie Mitchell (Jack Ryder), causing the actor to be "harangued" by strangers in public. In 2006, he commented, "I wouldn't have wanted to stay if Billy had been the way he was at the start. I didn't want to be another Nick Cotton, an out and out baddie, because it leaves you nowhere to go. You need to be a rounded character to fit in with the others. Then you can be a bit naughty, funny sometimes, in love sometimes — it all opens out. I'm proud of the way he's changed. I didn't like doing that nasty stuff. I needed and wanted the job, but I knew what would come with it — you can't go anywhere on this show without people telling you what they think."

Fenwick particularly likes the comedic side to the character. He has said, "I just ask them to keep it light and shade. I LOVE the comedy side of Billy but there's a sad side to him, too. He's like a little lost soul who is always beaten up and knocked down but he never gives up. He reminds me of Norman Wisdom."

=== Relationships ===
==== Honey Mitchell and Down syndrome ====
The character Honey Mitchell (Emma Barton) was introduced in November 2005. Her pregnancy was the start of an ongoing storyline about Down syndrome (DS) as, in September 2006, Honey and Billy's baby Janet was diagnosed with the disorder shortly after her birth. EastEnders' producers began to work on the DS plot in February 2006. Real parents with children who have Down Syndrome were approached to act as consultants in the making of the storyline, meeting with writers and the actors who play Billy and Honey. On-screen, Honey was shown to be devastated, rejecting her baby and wanting to have her adopted, while Billy wanted to keep his daughter, placing strain on the couple, who married in the serial the day of Janet's birth.

The Down's Syndrome Association (DSA) worked with EastEnders on the storyline. Their medical advisers were consulted about possible health problems that Billy and Honey's baby might encounter. According to the DSA in 2006, people with DS are under-represented on mainstream television and EastEnders helped to redress that imbalance. The DSA used their influence to change certain elements of the scripts that they were unhappy with, such as persuading them to change the way Billy and Honey were told of their baby's diagnosis; however, they had no influence over the characters' reactions or the plot in general. For the first two weeks after Janet's diagnosis, the DSA provided a helpline for worried parents or anyone wanting advice about DS. EastEnders also provided a link to the DSA website from theirs, to ensure that people looking for information could find the association.

The storyline was developed with characterisation in mind. Some characters, such as Peggy Mitchell, were shown to respond negatively towards the baby, views that were included so that the positive aspects could be voiced by the "more enlightened characters". The programme makers' main priority was to show the reality of having a child with the condition, "with all of its positives and negatives" and to "create awareness among thousands of people who know very little about Down syndrome, who might have out-dated or prejudiced views." EastEnders took advice from DS organisations and DS families throughout. Care was taken to ensure that viewers empathised with Billy and Honey, to portray their journey in a "realistic way".

The DSA have expressed their desire to see a character with Down syndrome becoming a permanent member of the EastEnders cast, as in their opinion "it would be a fantastic opportunity to bring Down's syndrome into mainstream awareness, and to present a 21st-century picture of family life for those who have children with the condition." In 2006, EastEnders pledged that they intended for Billy and Honey's baby to grow up as any other baby would in the soap; however, it has been noted that the plot is dependent on the actors involved, and other practical problems that could arise. EastEnders pledged to make every effort to portray "a positive image of a family who have a baby with the condition."

The episodes received criticism for inaccuracy. Sue Jacob, a teacher at the Royal College of Midwives (RCM), said EastEnders presented a "poor picture of midwifery practice". During Janet's birth, Honey was refused an epidural while in pain, and later she was told that her baby had Down syndrome alone, without her partner or family there to support her. Jacob commented, "Women are vulnerable after giving birth and they need support systems in place [...] The person caring for her is repeatedly referred to as a nurse in the episode but there is no way that a nurse would be in charge after birth. The midwife would also have been open and honest and said 'We need to get the baby checked out and we will get your partner' [...] What the soaps do is set scenes which prompt people to talk about things which are affecting their lives. We are concerned people will wrongly think this Down syndrome story shows what really happens, and that if you have a problem there is no one there to support you. Showing something like this is not helpful." Furthermore, Jacob noted that Honey was left alone for a long time to worry about the baby, which appeared rigid, and not floppy, as babies with DS do. In Jacob's opinion, a midwife would have been repeatedly in and out of the room to check on the mother. Additionally, one episode showed a health visitor reprimanding Honey for refusing Down syndrome screening and Karen Reay, director of the Community Practitioners' and Health Visitors' Association called the episode "insensitive and patronising". She added that the episode contained "glaring anomalies", giving new mothers a "fictitious and misleading" view of health visitors, which could "damage relationships with health professionals".

The BBC responded by saying, "EastEnders has undertaken a great deal of research to script the storyline of Billy and Honey giving birth to their baby daughter. EastEnders takes enormous care with its research and takes advice from experts in the given field. In addition, for this particular storyline EastEnders talked to numerous families with children who have Down Syndrome. Some of their experiences were depicted in these early episodes. Also closely involved was a senior midwife from a large UK general hospital who saw all scripts. In relation to some particular points raised, Honey was not denied an epidural — she made the choice to put herself out of reach of communicating effectively with the midwife by locking herself in the bathroom. When the news was broken to Honey and Billy that their baby had Down Syndrome, EastEnders has in fact drawn directly from one particular true-life story — and while this may indeed not be best practice it is worth saying that good drama does not necessarily come from best practice." Despite the BBC's "extensive search" to cast a real Down baby for the birth episodes, they were unable to do so, resulting in the shots of the newborn baby being less authentic and limited. The BBC added, "In the coming weeks Honey and Billy's child will be played by a baby with Down Syndrome. It is worth noting that EastEnders has received incredibly positive feedback from the Down Syndrome Association following the first few episodes, whom we are continuing to work with very closely." Carol Boys, chief executive of the Down Syndrome Association, has confirmed that 40% of parents whose babies were diagnosed after birth were given no written or practical information about the condition, and 11% were told, as Honey was, by a midwife rather than a paediatrician: "The way in which Billy and Honey have learnt of their baby's disability, and their subsequent support from their health professionals, is not a best-practice model. However, neither is it an unrealistic situation. BBC researchers and scriptwriters have based the scenes on conversations with families who have children with Down Syndrome, and the scenes have struck a chord with thousands of our parent members across the country. Some health professionals hold outdated or prejudiced views about people with Down Syndrome that prevent them from giving parents a balanced picture of what the future will hold for them."

==== Julie Perkins ====
In 2010, storylines show Billy receiving a letter from the care home he stayed in as a child, and a character from his past, Julie Perkins (Cathy Murphy) arrives in the series. Julie turns Billy's life upside-down and forces him to face some shocking home truths. The storyline was introduced as executive producer Bryan Kirkwood, who took on the role earlier in 2010, wanted Billy to have a storyline that was not connected to existing characters. Fenwick said the storyline was an acting challenge with plenty of twists and turns, and said "it's given me the chance to let go and be a little bit nutty."

In June 2011, it was announced that Danielle Harold had joined the cast, playing Julie and Billy's 15-year-old granddaughter Lola Pearce. It was reported that Billy and Julie would be shocked to learn of Lola's existence, not knowing the son they once gave up for adoption had a daughter, but would decide to track her down and find her living in a care home.

==== Ava Hartman ====
In 2013, Billy becomes romantically interested in Ava Hartman (Clare Perkins) and tries to impress her by fixing a scratch on her car, despite not knowing what he is doing; Dexter steps in to help him and Ava is grateful to Billy and the three go out for a drink together. Speaking of Billy's interest in Ava, Perkins told Inside Soap, "Ava has been by herself a long while...So when she realises that Billy fancies her, she thinks, 'Why not? Let's just see what happens!'" However, she believed that a romance between the pair would not work as she believed that the two characters would not "gel" due to Billy being a "kind of a loser", despite being "sweet and lovable", and Ava being a teacher.

Months later, Billy and Ava have a date which gets to a "promising start". When Ava tells Billy that she admires his closeness with Lola, he tells her that he is trying to make up for lost time, and this reminds Ava of her ex-husband Sam James (Cornell John). This sours the date as Billy realises that Ava is not over Sam. Ava then tries to rekindle the date by kissing Billy.

=== Olympic torch bearing storyline ===
In November 2011, Billy is selected to be a torch bearer for the 2012 Summer Olympics. In reality, Fenwick carried the torch through the setting of Albert Square, with live footage shown in the second episode on 23 July 2012.

== Storylines ==
Billy first arrives on Albert Square in November 1998 to break the news of his brother Charlie Mitchell's (Charlie Heptinstall) death, which leaves Charlie's 15-year-old son, Jamie Mitchell (Jack Ryder) orphaned and in Billy's care. Billy's cousin, Phil Mitchell (Steve McFadden), visits them and soon learns that Jamie has been in minor trouble in the police and that Billy has been taking his anger out on Jamie and violently abusing him. Phil threatens Billy to leave Jamie alone and takes Jamie back to the square to live with him.

While trying to settle himself in Walford, Billy becomes involved in criminal scams with Phil and his brother Grant Mitchell (Ross Kemp). However, Billy's relatives see him as little more than a lackey – up to the point where he is frequently denounced an embarrassment to the Mitchell name. Billy soon finds an ally in Grant's business partner Steve Owen (Martin Kemp), who hires Billy as an errand boy in numerous criminal activities – including drug-dealing – to antagonize the Mitchell brothers. Billy works at Steve's club, E20, and is given a 1% share of the club for his services; though he is left torn between his loyalties to his family and Steve himself.

After learning that Phil and Grant plan to do a robbery that is set to be botched, Billy alerts their sister Sam Mitchell (Danniella Westbrook) and her boyfriend Beppe di Marco (Michael Greco) about their plans – which sparks a police chase on the Mitchell Brothers that results in them driving into the River Thames; Phil is rescued while Grant is presumed dead. Following Grant's departure, Phil is shot (see Who Shot Phil?) by an unknown assailant on the night Steve marries their lover Mel Healy (Tamzin Outhwaite). As local chief detective DCI Jill Marsden (Sophie Stanton) embarks an investigation on Phil's shooting, Billy clashes with Phil's stepson Ian Beale (Adam Woodyatt) and his cousin Mark Fowler (Todd Carty) upon learning that the pair had separate motives for the crime. He also gets in a fight with Jamie over his ability to manage Phil's business, but is overpowered and forced to submit to his nephew's demand to be left alone. Soon afterwards, Phil discharges himself from hospital and frames his friend-turned-enemy Dan Sullivan (Craig Fairbrass) for the crime – even though his ex-girlfriend Lisa Fowler (Lucy Benjamin) was responsible for the shooting. Phil then forces Billy to testify against Dan to ensure his imprisonment. Steve observes this interaction – as he too wishes for Dan to get sent down, despite both of them being Phil's archenemies, in order to stop him from further tormenting Mel. However, Billy's testimony fails and Dan is found not guilty. Dan later confronts Billy in search of revenge for Phil and Steve, forcing him to acquire information about the pair's commonality to him. Billy ends up confiding to Dan about Mel sleeping with Phil before marrying Steve, which leads to him kidnapping Mel, holding her hostage, and asking for a £200,000 ransom. When Steve and Phil learn about this, they confront Billy about allowing Dan to get leverage over them. Billy manages to help Steve and Phil rescue Mel, but they fail to stop Dan from fleeing Walford with the money. In light of Dan's departure and Mel's kidnapping ordeal, Billy finds himself further embroiled in Phil and Steve's rivalry – up to the point where they each deem him distrustful. Their feud ultimately ends with Steve kidnapping Phil's infant daughter, Louise Fowler (Rachel Cox) to flee Walford with Mel and exact his last-ditch revenge. When Billy learns about this, he informs Phil and the latter manages to rescue Louise after Steve crashes his car and is killed in the ensuing explosion; Billy later accompanies Mel in arranging and then attending at Steve's funeral.

Eventually, Billy falls for local resident, Janine Butcher (Charlie Brooks) – even though she is only interested in his money. Janine dumps Billy after he runs out of money, he nevertheless helps her deal with some mental health issues – which leads Janine to hope for a reconciliation with Billy. However, he turns her down after developing romantic feelings for his colleague, Little Mo Morgan (Kacey Ainsworth) when the pair worked together in a cleaning company. As they bond, Billy confines to her about his past: he was physically abused by staff of a children's home in which he resided as a kid. She comforts him over his past ordeal, particularly when Ernie Johnson (John Junkin) – one of his former abusers – reappears in Walford as a pensioner. Billy later breaks into Ernie's home to confront him over the abuse, shaming him into moving away for good. Shortly afterwards, Billy uses his experience with confronting his demons to make amends with Jamie over the way he had treated him in the past. The two start to get along better, even when Billy learns that Jamie betrayed Phil and is being treated harshly because of it. By the time his relationship with Jamie is mended, Billy has become the sworn enemy of Little Mo's husband, Trevor Morgan (Alex Ferns) – because of the torment and abuse the latter imposed on her for the majority of their marriage. She soon leaves Trevor and starts a relationship with Billy. He later proposes to Little Mo by spelling out "MARRY ME" on her plate with alphabet spaghetti, and so they are engaged. When Trevor hears of it, he kidnaps Little Mo and his baby son Sean – intending for all three of them to die in a fire on Halloween night. However, Little Mo manages to escape from the house with Sean and they survive while Trevor is killed in a gas explosion. Despite the trauma Trevor put them through, Billy and Little Mo plan to get married on Christmas Day. Their happiness is virtually compromised when Jamie gets struck by a car driven by his best-friend and Mark's brother, Martin Fowler (James Alexandrou). Nevertheless, the pair get married – though, not before Billy visits Jamie to make peace with him before the latter dies of his injuries later that night.

Towards the first anniversary of their marriage, Little Mo is raped by her friend Graham Foster (Alex McSweeney) – which angers Billy. She discovers she is pregnant as a result of the assault and Billy presses her to have an abortion. However, Little Mo refuses and leaves Walford to clear her head – returning with baby Freddie to see Graham convicted of rape. Billy and Little Mo reunite, but their marriage eventually ends after he admits to being unable to love Freddie due to comparing him with Graham. Later, Billy starts a relationship with newcomer Honey Edwards (Emma Barton), whom he manages during her spell as a model. The relationship prospers, despite initial disapproval from Honey's father, Jack Edwards (Nicky Henson), who takes time to accept Billy. Honey falls pregnant and accepts Billy's marriage proposal. Their wedding is postponed when Honey is hospitalised, they reschedule, however the second ceremony goes awry because of a practical joke played on Billy during his stag night. Billy's aunt Peggy Mitchell (Barbara Windsor) then arranges a surprise wedding. Billy and Honey have just time enough to complete their vows before Honey goes into labour. She delivers a girl, Janet Mitchell (Grace), but the Mitchells are devastated to discover she has Down syndrome. Honey rejects her baby, she goes into depression, contemplating infanticide, and demands Janet be put up for adoption. Billy is opposed, but, after agonising over the decision, eventually consents. After Janet is taken into foster care, she has a health scare and is hospitalised – forcing Honey to acknowledge she loves her baby and so Janet is brought home.

Honey falls pregnant again and William Mitchell (Toby Walpole) is born. His birth is traumatic, as Honey goes into labour after being caught in a violent siege: she is assaulted by a member of a football firm led by local gang boss Terry Bates (Nicholas Ball). William seems stillborn at first but is resuscitated by medics. Billy and Honey have financial problems and their landlady, Manju Patel (Leena Dhingra), decides to evict them. Billy steals charity money to pay the rent and barricades them into the flat but they are evicted at Christmas. They rely on the kindness of friends and relatives until the council rehouses them. Desperate for money, Billy takes a job as a getaway driver for Jase Dyer (Stephen Lord), believing they are stealing money from Terry Bates, the leader of the firm responsible for hurting Honey. The job is a set-up, and Terry takes Jase's son Jay Brown (Jamie Borthwick) hostage in their absence. Assisted by Billy, Jay escapes but Jase is killed by Terry in the ensuing fight, while Billy hides in the bathroom, too afraid to help Jase. Not realising this, Jay hails Billy a hero for trying to rescue his father. Billy breaks down and confesses his cowardice to Honey, revealing that he kept some of Jase's money, allegedly to give to now orphaned Jay. Honey is incensed, she threatens to leave Billy but reconsiders on condition he never lies to her again. Billy does lie and keeps some of Jase's money, telling Honey he has donated it to charity. Honey subsequently ends their marriage and takes her children to live with her father, leaving Billy alone and depressed.

Billy visits Jay at his foster home and agrees to foster him, but problems arise when Nick Cotton (John Altman) blackmails Billy, threatening to tell Jay the truth about his cowardice on the night of Jase's death. Unable to meet Nick's demands, Billy is forced to tell Jay the truth instead and Jay reacts in fury. Terry's gang try to stop Billy testifying at the upcoming trial. Billy testifies, despite threats, and Terry is sentenced to life imprisonment for murdering Jase. Afterwards, Billy is redeemed in the eyes of Jay. However, Jay later begins to idolise Phil, to the virtual exclusion of Billy.

When Billy stops a man from pestering Jean Slater (Gillian Wright) at a club, she brands him a hero and they end up having sex. Embarrassed by the fling, the following day, Billy insults Jean, killing her hopes for romance. He later begins a more serious relationship with Julie Perkins (Cathy Murphy), a fellow resident of the children's home where he lived as a kid. Billy is shocked to discover Julie fell pregnant with his child in their teens, their son was adopted and is now a grown man. Billy attempts to find his son, Dan Pearce, but is devastated to discover he died of liver failure and that his granddaughter, Lola Pearce (Danielle Harold), is in care. Billy visits Lola and they bond. Lola moves in with her grandparents but proves troublesome, and, when Billy continuously overrules Julie's attempts to discipline her, a rift forms and Julie leaves Walford. Lola's announcement that she is pregnant leads to Billy going back to his criminal ways to provide for his great-grandchild —stealing from Janine and trading stolen goods and forgeries for Derek Branning (Jamie Foreman). Janine eventually discovers and sacks Billy for his deception. However, she has a change of heart, she reinstates him and allows him to keep the items he ordered for Lola's baby. Billy grows tired of Lola's troublesome behaviour and gives her a curfew and electronic tag After which he can focus on being an Olympic Torch bearer, of which he learnt several months earlier. Billy successfully carries the torch and witnesses the birth of his great-granddaughter, Lexi Pearce (Dotti-Beau Cotterill).

Billy and Lola are devastated when Lexi is taken into temporary foster care, as Lola's social worker, Trish Barnes (Tessa Churchard), does not think that they are coping. Lexi's father is revealed to be Phil's son, Ben Mitchell (Joshua Pascoe). Thus, Phil gains temporary custody of Lexi. He is even supportive when Lola runs away with Lexi, and tells her that he is the selfish one for sticking by the three times a week access rules. Billy persuades Phil to let Lexi stay over at their flat once or twice a week. He says that he is happy with that, but Trish is still unsure whether Lola should be alone with Lexi. Lola sets up her own business, doing manicures and pedicures, which she seems to enjoy. She and Billy make an effort to keep their flat a tidy environment, and set the small bedroom up for Lexi for when she returns home. Eventually, Lola is re-awarded custody of Lexi. Billy is over-protective of Lola when she starts a relationship with Peter Beale (Ben Hardy), but eventually becomes friends with him and realises that he is a good man. Peter moves into their flat, but moves out to look after his father when his sister, Lucy Beale (Hetti Bywater) is murdered (see Who Killed Lucy Beale?). However, Peter and Lola continue their relationship. Billy is delighted when Honey returns with Janet and William, and he thinks she wants to reunite with him. He is devastated to learn that Honey wants to move to Canada with their children. In the end, she decides to take just William, leaving Janet in Billy's care.

Billy gets a job working for undertaker Les Coker (Roger Sloman). He is confronted by Lee Carter (Danny Hatchard), Tina Carter (Luisa Bradshaw-White) and Tosh Mackintosh (Rebecca Scroggs) because Lee saw him arguing with Lucy on the night she was murdered. Billy lies about it and says he was working at the fish and chip shop and Lucy was frustrated with having to wait for her chips, causing the argument. Billy tells Phil that Lucy knew he was stealing fish from the chip shop, which is the real reason for the argument. Phil tells Tina, Tosh and Lee that Lucy was trying to take money from the till, and convinces them not to tell Ian. Billy realises his fingerprints are in Tina and Tosh's kitchen, where Lucy's blood and earring were found, as he was also stealing food, so he tries to clean them up, but Tosh catches him. Tosh and Lee then decide to go to the police. Then, babysitter Pam Coker (Lin Blakley) discovers photographs of Lucy behind Billy's fridge. Billy is questioned for his involvement with Lucy as it finally transpired he was arguing with her on the night of her death. However, he was not with her around the time of her murder at all, so he is cleared.

Billy is later revealed to be one of very few people who were aware that Kathy Sullivan (Gillian Taylforth) was still alive. When Lucy's murder investigation starts to come around to questioning Jay and Ben, he panics over Jay's intention to leave Walford following Phil's attempts to hand in Ben to the police thinking he did it, which disgusts Billy that Phil would betray his family. He attempts to distance himself from Phil but ends up doing exactly the same thing to Jay in a desperate attempt to keep Lola on the square when he discovers she was ready to leave Walford with him. Lola leaves on her own eventually feeling she has to try and break out and make something of herself that she won't be able to do in Walford, leaving him heartbroken. Later Billy reconciles with Phil to a degree, taking on board that the two have to try and hold together the family as best as they can. He pays for Billy to spend a few months in Canada with Honey and William. When he returns, he admits his feelings for Honey have returned, and drunkenly leaves a voicemail explaining how he feels. Honey comes to Walford and admits she feels the same, and they end up having sex. They decide to take things slow, with Honey moving in with Billy's cousin Ronnie Mitchell (Samantha Womack) and they decide to get engaged. However Honey ends the engagement when she discovers that Jay has been drug dealing and that Billy knew about it. Billy manages to convince Honey to give him another chance. Honey does so but on the condition they help Jay together, but they later catch him stealing their wedding fund from Janet's piggy bank, leading Honey to call the police. Jay is arrested but released a day later. When Honey discovers that Jay staying with them may result in Janet and Will being taken into care, Jay moves out. When Pam and Les decide to leave Walford, Les appoints Billy as the new manager of the funeral parlour. Despite initial problems, Billy eventually settles into his new role. Upon advice from Pam, Billy gives Jay a job in the funeral parlour. Pam and Les leave and Billy begins managing the parlour. However, unbeknownst to Billy, Jay secretly steals money from the undertakers to pay his drug dealers. He later follows this up by stealing jewellery from a corpse. However, he returns these saying he took them to be cleaned professionally, leading Billy to believe that Jay's behaviour is improving. Honey and Billy are burgled and their wedding fund and Janet's Christmas gift of a tablet computer are stolen, so Billy vows to build Janet a doll's house. They later move into the flat above the funeral parlour. Billy is then offered a partnership in the business, which he accepts. However, he struggles with the accounts and is visited by HMRC representatives who tell him that he could face a large fine, which Jay pays for him.

After Janet is hit by a car driven by Tina, Tina comforts Billy and they end up kissing and having sex while Honey is in hospital with Janet. Billy becomes part of a robbery arranged by Aidan Maguire (Patrick Bergin), and Billy hides the stolen money in a coffin. Billy exhumes a grave to find the cash but it has been taken. This is caught on CCTV, so Pam is forced to sack Billy. Billy tells Honey he got a pay rise but Tina urges him to tell her the truth; Honey sees them hugging and then tells Billy she knows what he is going to tell her, thinking they are having an affair. Billy admits to a one-night stand with Tina and the next day, he discovers Honey has cut up all his clothes. When Tina's sister, Shirley Carter (Linda Henry), sees Billy and Honey talking, she assumes Honey found out Tina was driving the car that hit Janet and reveals the fact to Honey. Honey then cuts Billy out of her photos. Billy starts sleeping rough in the office of the closed nightclub, and is discovered by Mel, who is reopening the club. She hires Billy and allows him to sleep on her sofa. In Aidan's search for the missing money, he attacks Billy for standing up to him. Honey tends to Billy's wounds and brings Janet to see him but she is too scared of his injuries to go to him. Billy then rents a room in a house with Jay and Donna Yates (Lisa Hammond). Donna later moves away. Honey begins dating Adam Bateman (Stephen Rahman-Hughes), much to Billy's jealousy. Lola and Lexi return to Walford and move in with Billy and Jay. Billy becomes suspicious that Adam is cheating on Honey, but she is in denial and stays with her partner. Billy gets involved with Karen Taylor (Lorraine Stanley). Shortly after they commit to a relationship, Honey and the children move back in with Billy after she splits from Adam. Honey kisses Billy on New Year's Eve but he rejects her as he is with Karen. Karen briefly breaks up with Billy when she believes he is in cahoots with Phil over the disappearance of her son Keanu Taylor (Danny Walters), but they reconcile when Billy insists he is on her side, not Phil's. Billy realises Honey has bulimia nervosa.

== In other appearances ==
The character of Billy Mitchell has been spoofed in the cartoon sketch show 2DTV. Billy appears in series 2 of the spin-off series EastEnders: E20.

== Reception ==
Billy has been described by Nicola Methven, TV editor of The Mirror, as one of EastEnders' most popular characters. According to actor Perry Fenwick, Billy was initially unpopular with a proportion of viewers for his abusive antics on-screen. In 2006, Fenwick commented, "In the beginning it was all old ladies having a go at me, and young girls who fancied Jack Ryder". However, when the character's personality altered, the reception to his character improved. Fenwick adds, " Now it's great — people really like Billy and shout out: "All right, Billy boy, how's it going?". According to Methven, "The turning point for Billy's popularity came when viewers learned his nasty streak was a result of him having been abused and bullied while growing up in a children's home" In 2020, Sara Wallis and Ian Hyland from The Daily Mirror placed Billy 49th on their ranked list of the Best EastEnders characters of all time, calling him a "Perpetual loser in life and love" who is portrayed "superbly" by Fenwick. In 2024, following the scenes where Billy discusses how his father neglected him, Chloe Timms from Inside Soap wrote "Perry Fenwick has been out of this world. Brilliant stuff!".

== See also ==
- List of EastEnders: E20 characters
- List of soap opera villains
