= Who Killed Lucy Beale? =

Storyline from the BBC soap opera EastEnders

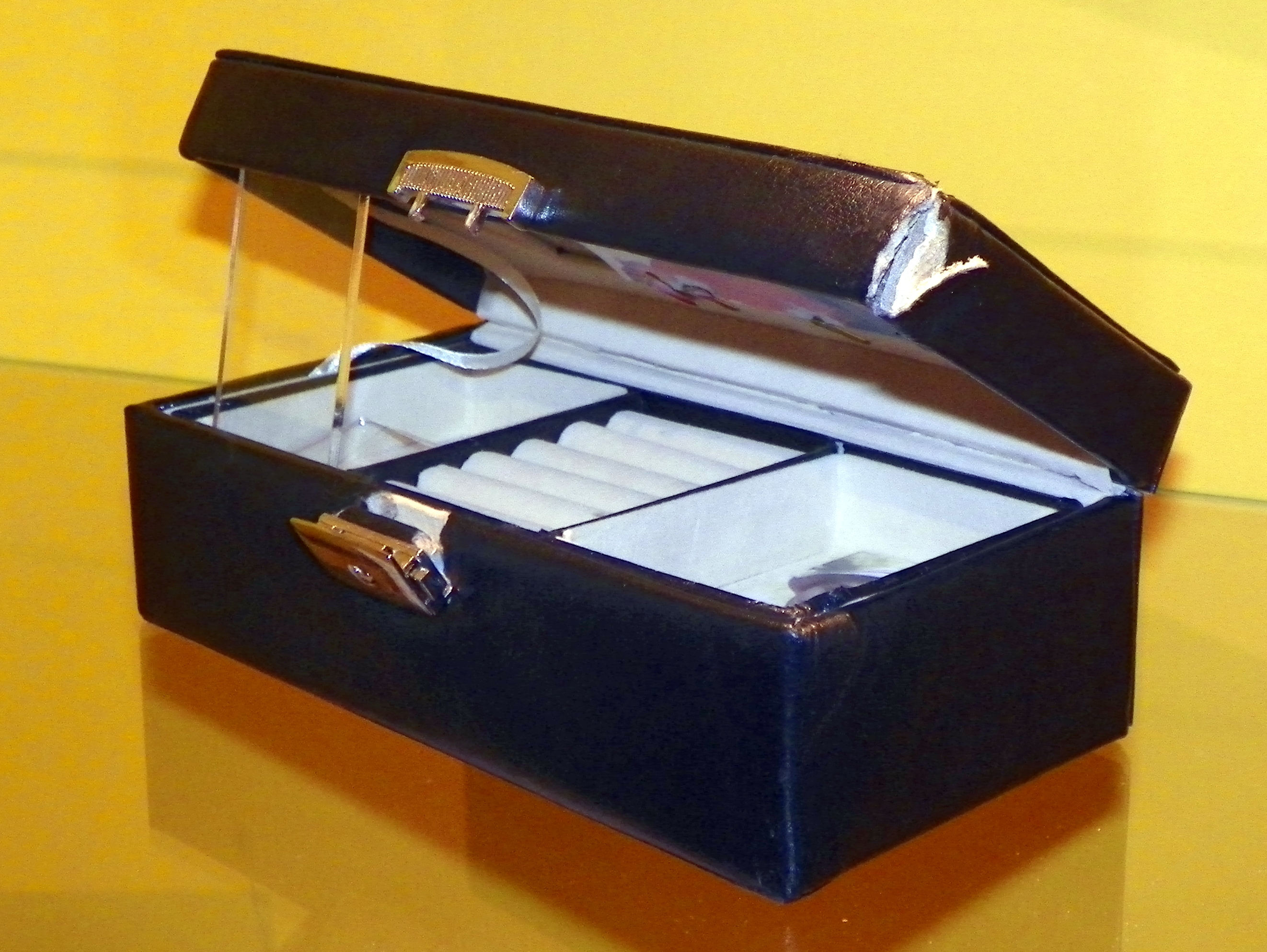
The jewellery box prop that was the murder weapon in the storyline

"Who Killed Lucy Beale?" is a storyline from the BBC soap opera EastEnders. It was announced on 21 February 2014, and began on 18 April 2014, when Lucy Beale (Hetti Bywater) was discovered dead on Walford Common from a deliberately inflicted head injury. The storyline reached a peak during EastEnders Live Week on 19 February 2015, the show's 30th anniversary episode, during which Lucy's 10-year-old half-brother, Bobby Beale (Eliot Carrington) is revealed to have killed her following a confrontation at home. Bobby's adoptive mother and Lucy's stepmother, Jane Beale (Laurie Brett), had covered for him, moving Lucy's body to Walford Common and convincing Bobby that he was not responsible for his sister's death.

The storyline was revived in July 2015, where it showed how the Beales coped with covering the secret and many locals being wrongfully arrested for committing the crime. The storyline reached another peak in December 2015, when Bobby discovers the truth. The storyline was revisited again in May 2016, when Bobby brutally attacks Jane, and reveals in a busy pub that he killed Lucy and attacked Jane. However, Jane survives the attack – although facing potential paralysis – and Bobby is arrested; he is later charged for Lucy's murder. The storyline culminated in the 16 June 2016 episode when Bobby is sentenced to three years custody in a young offenders institution for killing Lucy and causing grievous bodily harm upon Jane.

During the storyline, Max Branning (Jake Wood) was initially found guilty of Lucy's murder and sentenced to 20 years imprisonment. After Bobby is jailed for Lucy's murder, the story can be seen as the catalyst for 2017's central storyline, which saw Max seeking revenge on the community, particularly Sharon's husband Phil Mitchell (Steve McFadden) and Lucy's father Ian Beale (Adam Woodyatt), for allowing him to go to prison for Lucy's murder.

The storyline is revisited again in June 2019 when Bobby is released from the young offenders institution, and in 2021, when Bobby explores what it is to pursue a relationship after his criminal history and the tabloid headlines which surrounded the murder.

In August 2023, the storyline is returned to once again when Lucy's mother, Cindy Beale (Michelle Collins), is seen secretly returning to Walford in a flashback to the night Lucy died. Cindy had been in witness protection since 1998 and presumed dead, only returning upon hearing the news of Lucy's death. Her return to Walford risked blowing her cover and she subsequently had to abandon her new family in Marbella as well as leaving her family in Walford. Cindy's new family, including ex-husband George Knight (Colin Salmon), later moved to Walford, prompting her full-time return.

Cindy subsequently struggled to accept living with Lucy’s murderer, Bobby, causing tension between her and Ian. The story continues into July 2024 when Jane Beale returns. Cindy blames Jane for covering up Lucy’s murder, while Jane explains that she was only trying to protect her adoptive son, Bobby, as Cindy’s son Steven (Aaron Sidwell) had shot Jane in 2007, making her unable to have any biological children of her own.

== Storyline creation and development ==
The murder story was in the style of a "whodunit" mystery. Only four members of the show's production team knew who was responsible for Lucy's death. The marketing campaign for the storyline was EastEnders biggest yet; the first specially created trailer aired immediately after the murder. The identity of Lucy's killer was shown in a special live episode marking the 30th anniversary of EastEnders in February 2015. The story, which began on Good Friday 2014, is described by executive producer Dominic Treadwell-Collins as being "emotionally right, true and very exciting" and that, after initially deciding on a killer, they came up with an alternative killer early in the planning stages as their initial choice "didn't come from the heart".

In December 2014, it was stated that the list of suspects would be cut down to just 11, although 14 suspects were later revealed on-screen. On 5 January 2015, it was confirmed that the murderer would be revealed in a live flashback episode to mark the anniversary week.

=== Later development ===
Lucy's younger half brother Bobby Beale was revealed to be the killer on 19 February 2015, in a special flashback episode. Treadwell-Collins mentioned that the killer reveal would be different to the show's predecessing whodunit, "Who Killed Archie?". "With Archie, it was a one-line reveal, but with this one it's more complicated: there are a few conversations." Following the reveal, the executive producer said that the storyline is the "start of a bigger story". He also mentioned that the original killer was Jane Beale and then Cindy Williams, but stated his reason for the change: "There was one other suspect for about a day, but then it didn't feel right. We always said that this story had to come from the heart, and with this, it's the start of a whole big new story for the Beales." Bobby being the culprit was originally suggested by series producer Alex Lamb. On Twitter, Dominic Treadwell-Collins announced that drop-ins were filmed to accompany the recent killer reveal during live week. These scenes aired from 23 to 24 February.

== Suspects and motives ==
For a major part of the storyline, the premise was that every character on the show (except for Stacey Branning (Lacey Turner), who was in prison at the time) could be a suspect. Following the episode that aired on 1 January 2015, the number of official suspects was whittled down to a list of fourteen, when character Emma Summerhayes (Anna Acton) sent a text message to the person she believed was the killer, with the fourteen characters all being on screen when the message reached its unspecified recipient's phone. By the end of January, Lauren Branning (Jacqueline Jossa) no longer appeared as a suspect in promotional material ahead of the anniversary episode, bringing the list of suspects down to thirteen. On 20 February 2015, it was revealed that Emma had sent the text message to Jane Beale (Laurie Brett), who was in fact covering for her adoptive son, Bobby Beale (Eliott Carrington).

- Ian Beale, played by Adam Woodyatt. In the days leading up to Lucy's death, Ian was troubled by his daughter's behaviour and Cindy, jealous of Ian favouring Lucy over herself, revealed that Lucy had a secret stash of cocaine hidden in her jewellery box. After a heated argument, Ian told Lucy that she was his favourite child as Peter overheard, running off as Lucy chased after him. Ian stated in his alibi that he was at the restaurant the night she died, but Cindy mentioned that she went there to look for him and he was not there. He was in fact with Rainie Cross, a prostitute.
- Jane Beale, played by Laurie Brett. Jane had been staying at her friend Masood's house over Easter. She claimed not to have left the house, but provided Lauren with an alibi after claiming that she had seen Lauren approach the Beale house and then leave moments later without entering.
- Peter Beale, played by Ben Hardy. On the night of Lucy's death, Peter overheard his father Ian tell Lucy that she was his favourite child. He ran out, stating in his alibi that he needed some time alone. Prior to the murder, it was revealed that Lucy had been taking cocaine. Jane reads out the texts on Lucy's phone including an unsent message to Peter on the night of her death asking for drugs. He later confesses to being her drug dealer, making sure he can control her addiction.
- Abi Branning, played by Lorna Fitzgerald. Max received an anonymous email of a picture of him kissing Lucy, which was later revealed to have been sent by Abi. She was very unstable during her police interview, and stated in her alibi that she was at home with her father Max all night, but was left alone briefly when Max went out to walk the dog. On Halloween 2014, Abi stalked her sister Lauren wearing a Weeping Angel mask when she became uncomfortable with Lauren dismissing her problems in favour of her own. During a heated confrontation, Abi tries to drown Lauren. She later denies killing Lucy, but admits that she wishes that she had.
- Max Branning, played by Jake Wood. Prior to Good Friday, it was revealed that Max had been having an affair with Lucy. A few days before her death, the pair had a heated argument, resulting in Lucy falling and hitting her head and he later grabbed her aggressively. Both incidents were captured on CCTV footage and reviewed by David. David originally blamed Max for the murder, but after the two talk, David decides to keep quiet about the incidents and the laptop containing the evidence is destroyed. Max stated in his alibi that he was at home all night except for when he left for five minutes to walk the dog, which was later confirmed by an anxious Abi, after her maternal grandmother, Cora, called the police after noticing Max and Abi cleaning up Lucy's blood from the car lot.
- Jay Brown, played by Jamie Borthwick. Although no given motive has presented itself, CCTV footage revealed that Jay was on the same bus as Lucy the night that she was murdered, and was shown to have followed her after she got off. He burned the hat that he was wearing in the footage, and later buried Lucy's purse and phone.
- Lee Carter, played by Danny Hatchard. Lee had a fling with Lucy in the days running up to her death, upsetting love rival Whitney. In his alibi, Lee stated that he was at the housewarming party at the time of the death. Before the party he had seen Billy in a heated argument with Lucy.
- Les Coker, played by Roger Sloman. In Les' alibi, he states that he was watching "a Marlon Brando classic". Les runs a funeral business, and was heavily involved in faking the death of Nick Cotton before he was questioned by the police.
- Pam Coker, played by Lin Blakley. On the anniversary of her son's death, she became worried when Emma asked her questions surrounding Lucy's death. She later revealed to Billy that she had killed someone.
- Whitney Dean, played by Shona McGarty. Whitney developed feelings for Lee, but on the day of Lucy's death, discovered that the two had sex. Whitney and Lucy were also involved in cyberbullying conflicts on a social networking site in which Lucy supposedly made remarks about Whitney's weight. At Lucy's funeral, Whitney leaves a message saying "Rot in Hell" which is found by Tamwar. Whitney asked Lauren for the password to Lucy's profile, telling her that she wanted to delete the hate off of Lucy's profile, though deleted all of the messages, including ones that Whitney and Lucy shared. Later, DI Keeble notices suspicious activity which arose on Lauren's laptop in the run-up to Lucy's death, referring to the deletion of a conversation that happened between Whitney and Lucy.
- Denise Fox, played by Diane Parish. On the day of Lucy's death, Denise revealed to her daughter Libby that she was planning on leaving Ian, sick of him favouring his own family over hers. However, after learning about Lucy's death, she chose to stay with him, though eventually left him after learning of his involvement with Rainie. A few months later, she dug up Lucy's purse and phone in Patrick's allotments. She was initially hesitant about turning them over to Ian, but did after being urged to by Masood.
- Ben Mitchell, played by Harry Reid. Ben is Lucy's uncle. He returned to the square five months after Lucy's death and thus had not been questioned by the police. For unknown reasons, Ben possessed Lucy's missing phone and purse, and ordered Jay to dispose of them. When Denise accidentally dug them up, Ben claimed to Ian that he had found them on Good Friday, and then disposed of them after learning of Lucy's death.
- Cindy Williams, played by Mimi Keene. In the days running up to the murder, Cindy got increasingly jealous of Ian treating her poorly. Cindy told Ian that Lucy had something hidden in her jewellery box, which was later revealed to be cocaine, given to Lucy by her twin brother, Peter. On Christmas Day, Cindy unwrapped the jewellery box which was under the tree, noted as a present for her daughter Beth.

The following were listed as suspects prior to January 2015 and had been questioned by the police:

- Lauren Branning, played by Jacqueline Jossa. Lucy's best friend. Lauren was uncharacteristically happy to dismiss Lucy's emotional state during their final scene. She stated that she went to Ronnie and Roxy's housewarming party then returned straight home, but video evidence contradicted her story, showing her heading to the Beale house. Jane provides Lauren with an alibi, revealing that from the Masood house, she saw Lauren arrive and leave the Beale house without entering.
- Linda Carter, played by Kellie Bright. Linda is the mother of suspect Lee, and had disapproved of him having sex with Lucy on the night before her death.
- Mick Carter, played by Danny Dyer. Mick found out about his son Lee and Lucy's relationship in the days running up to the murder. At the time of her death, Mick was hosting a pool tournament at The Queen Victoria.
- Charlie Cotton, played by Declan Bennett. Upon Charlie's arrival, he had a deal in hand with fellow resident Les concerning the faking of his father Nick's death. He was questioned by the police following the incident.
- Billy Mitchell, played by Perry Fenwick. Billy was originally going into business with Lucy, but it was later revealed that she was playing him. Later in the storyline, Lee revealed that he had seen Billy in a heated confrontation with Lucy hours before her death, but was unsure if Billy had followed her or not. He and Lola were attending the wedding of Ronnie and Charlie when Emma met with the supposed killer.
- Lola Pearce, played by Danielle Harold. Lola became increasingly jealous of her boyfriend Peter's involvement in his sister's life. She and Billy were attending the wedding of Ronnie and Charlie when Emma met with the supposed killer.
- Jake Stone, played by Jamie Lomas .Jake sent a message addressed to Lauren as Mr jones a client that is interested in buying a flat to get her to meet him at the flats near walford common(where Lucy is later found dead) to declare he still loves her, however the email in read by Lucy and so arrives at walford common only to discover that Jake is actually mr jones. Lucy's blood was found in Jake's flat and he was arrested, but he was later released when a witness backed up Jake's story that he had been drunk and that Lucy helped him home.
- Dean Wicks, played by Matt Di Angelo. Dean was questioned by the police following the murder.

== Plot ==
=== Events leading up to the murder ===
Lucy Beale (Hetti Bywater) decides to set up a letting agency, despite cynicism from her father, Ian Beale (Adam Woodyatt). Her former colleague Billy Mitchell (Perry Fenwick) offers to be her business partner but she turns him down in favour of her friend, Lauren Branning (Jacqueline Jossa). It is revealed that Lucy is secretly having a sexual relationship with Lauren's father Max Branning (Jake Wood). She also has sex with Lee Carter (Danny Hatchard), despite being aware that Whitney Dean (Shona McGarty) harbours romantic feelings for Lee. Lucy's behaviour with Lee causes tension between her and Max; during a disagreement in Max's car showroom, Lucy trips and falls, resulting in a minor injury to her head. She then ends her relationship with Max, and continues her relationship with Lee. Max receives an anonymous email that states, "What have you been doing?" and contains a photograph of him and Lucy embracing. Lucy's half-sister, Cindy Williams (Mimi Keene) becomes jealous of Lucy being Ian's favourite. On Good Friday, Cindy tells Ian and Jane Beale (Laurie Brett) to open Lucy's jewellery box. They find a bag of cocaine inside. The revelation prompts Ian to cancel a planned trip with his fiancée Denise Fox (Diane Parish) to Oxford to see her daughter Libby (Belinda Owusu), upsetting Denise. Ian and Jane catch Lee and Lucy having sex in Ian's restaurant. Ian confronts Lucy about the cocaine but she runs off. She goes to the Branning's house to work with Lauren, but leaves after having words with Max. She later returns to speak to Ian, who tells Lucy that she has always been his favourite child. Lucy's twin brother Peter Beale (Ben Hardy) overheard this, and storms off. Lucy is furious with Ian and leaves to find Peter. In The Queen Victoria public house, Whitney is upset when she finds out about Lee and Lucy's relationship. In the Square, Lucy sees her friends going to Ronnie (Samantha Womack) and Roxy Mitchell's (Rita Simons) house-warming party. Lauren urges her to join them, failing to notice that Lucy is upset, while Whitney shoots angry glares at her. Lucy bumps into Max again rebuffing his advances; he grabs her violently by the wrist. Lucy reads a text and leaves Albert Square for an unknown location.

Lucy begins to walk towards the bus stop, texting Peter to ask for cocaine (he later buys some, but keeps it for himself). On her journey, she passes by her father's chip shop, where she spots Billy stealing fish during his shift. She confronts him and says that she is going to tell Ian. He follows her, grabs her by the wrist and begs her to keep quiet, before suggesting that he fancies her. Disgusted, Lucy heads off towards the bus stop, but is stopped by Lee, who has seen her argument with Billy. He encourages her to join him at the house-warming party, and Lucy agrees to join him later, but must go to show a buyer one of her flats first.

Lucy boards the Number 30 bus, and is followed by Jay Brown (Jamie Borthwick). Jay meets with Ben Mitchell (Harry Reid), who has just been released from prison following the death of Heather Trott (Cheryl Fergison). Ben surprises Lucy at the flat, and confronts her about not giving him money that she had originally promised, as he had planned to move to Miami. An intoxicated Jake Stone (Jamie Lomas) is revealed to be the potential buyer, but he admits he was only there in hopes of rekindling his romance with Lauren, who he had expected to be showing him the flat. Lucy and Jake take an unlicensed taxi, driven by Arsim Kelmendi (Tomasz Aleksander) back to Walford.

While out walking his dog, Max spots Lucy struggling to carry Jake back to his flat and reluctantly agrees to help. Max's other daughter Abi Branning (Lorna Fitzgerald) watches on, believing they're about to continue their sexual relationship. Once in the flat, Max goads Jake, who attempts to punch him. He misses Max and instead hits Lucy, causing her nose to bleed and her earring to fall out. Lucy goes into the bathroom to clean herself up, and Max tells her that their relationship doesn't have to end but Lucy rebuffs him. She leaves the flat but is robbed of her purse and phone by Ben, who has followed her back to Walford. Lucy begins to walk home and meets Abi, who expresses her disgust at her relationship with her father, and proceeds to slap her.

Lucy arrives on the Square, where Jane rushes over to talk to her. Lucy then tells Jane that she has had a terrible night, and asks her to resume living at the Beale house. Jane reminds Lucy about her father's engagement to Denise, but Lucy doesn't believe that they are happy, and asks Jane to be a mother-figure to her once again. Jane says that she doesn't want to return home, but Lucy misinterprets this as Jane rejecting her, and goes home. She then overhears Denise talking to her daughter Chelsea Fox (Tiana Benjamin) on the phone, and discovers that Denise plans to leave Ian. Lucy confronts Denise, and they engage in a bitter fight which is overheard by Lucy's youngest brother Bobby (Eliot Carrington). The fight culminates with Lucy slapping Denise and Denise pinning Lucy down on the floor. Elsewhere, Cindy heads to the restaurant looking for Ian, but after not finding him there, leaves a voicemail message for Lucy asking whether she will come home that night. She narrowly misses Lucy and heads to bed with Bobby who feigns being asleep. While jogging, Peter considers returning to the Beale house, but instead returns to Billy's bedsit. Lucy meanwhile sits outside on the street after brawling with Denise, distraught that her life has crumbled around her, as a jealous Whitney looks on. Lee leaves a voicemail for Lucy asking when he will see her, before returning to the party. Ian returns home after sleeping with prostitute Rainie Cross (Tanya Franks) and also leaves a message for Lucy, telling her that he is sorry. Lucy goes home and begins writing a letter in the living room. As she does, she is startled by someone when the floorboards creak, and she sees her assailant. Shortly afterwards, Jane receives a panicked phone call, and rushes over to the Beale house, where she sees the door is open. She walks in to find Lucy lying on the living room floor. Jane checks her pulse and is distraught to realise that Lucy is dead. She turns around to find Bobby, who tells her that "Whatever she [Lucy] says, she started it. She made everyone unhappy". Jane realises that Bobby is responsible as he is holding Lucy's jewellery box, the one which she stored cocaine in, having used it to hit Lucy with.

Jane convinces Bobby that he has done nothing wrong, and reassuring him that Lucy will be fine, sends him to bed. Jane contemplates taking Lucy to the hospital, but when she is unnerved at the devastation it could cause, she instead puts Lucy in the boot of her car, and takes her to Walford Common. Jane says her goodbyes to Lucy and leaves her body.

=== Investigation following Lucy's death ===
The next morning, Lucy's body is discovered by a young girl walking with her grandfather on Walford Common. DC Emma Summerhayes (Anna Acton) and DS Cameron Bryant (Glen Wallace) visit Ian to inform him they have found Lucy's body. Ian is inconsolable as he identifies her body and breaks the news to Jane, Denise, Cindy, Bobby and, later, Peter. It is revealed Lucy died because of a deliberate head injury. The police question the family and search Lucy's bedroom. Cindy tells Ian that Lucy was an habitual user of cocaine. Ian says that he was at his restaurant the previous evening, but Cindy says she went there and did not see him. Ian laments that he did not know his daughter at all and furiously throws Cindy out, forcing her to return to Devon. The police take a DNA sample from Lee before he returns to Afghanistan. Summerhayes returns to say that there has been a leak at the police station and the press have got hold of some vital information. It is explained that there was very little blood found at the common, meaning that Lucy was not killed in a mugging, but was murdered elsewhere, then dumped on the Common. Her purse and phone are also missing. Lucy's uncle David Wicks (Michael French) discovers Max's sexual relationship with Lucy and accuses him of killing her. Max denies it but David later finds CCTV footage of Max and Lucy arguing on the night of her death. David does not tell the police because he is worried that if Max is questioned it will affect the health of his cancer-stricken fiancée Carol Jackson (Lindsay Coulson), who is Max's sister. He says that he does not believe Max killed her and together they burn all computer evidence of the footage.

When Lauren reopens LB Lettings for business, she discovers the email intended for her but read by Lucy on the night of her death. The sender is asking that they meet and Lauren suspects it was sent by Lucy's killer. She takes the information to the police but they tell her they are already looking into the matter. Lauren arranges to meet the person herself at a café on Walford Common and is stunned to discover it is her former lover, Jake. Jake says that he sent Lauren the email, hoping to reconcile with Lauren and used a false name, guessing she would not reply if she knew it was from him. He arranged to meet her at the café, but instead found Lucy there. Jake explains he was very drunk and Lucy accompanied him back to Walford in an unlicensed taxi. He cannot remember any more details. Lauren does not believe him and suspects he made a pass at Lucy, was rejected, he lashed out and killed her. Lauren visits the police again. The police arrest Jake after finding Lucy's blood and one of her earrings in his flat. He is later charged with her murder.

On the day of Lucy's funeral, Max's youngest daughter, Abi, tells Max that she knew about his sexual relationship with Lucy and that it was she who sent the email and photograph. The relationship is made public and he is ostracised by the residents of Walford. Sharon Rickman (Letitia Dean) is also concerned when she overhears Cindy talking to Ian about his false alibi. After the funeral, Tamwar Masood (Himesh Patel) finds a note in the church to Lucy, "ROT IN HELL". He recognises the handwriting as Whitney's and confronts her. Whitney claims that Lucy had been relentlessly cyber-bullying her about her weight and appearance. She admits that she hated Lucy, but denies killing her. Tamwar agrees not to say anything. Following the funeral, Jane decides to take Bobby back to Cardiff with her, wanting to give him a new start away from the shadow of Lucy's death.

Curious about Ian's false alibi, Sharon and her boyfriend Phil Mitchell (Steve McFadden) decide to visit Jake in prison and begin to believe that he might be innocent. When they question Ian, he assures them that he is not involved with Lucy's death in any way. Peter discovers that Sharon and Phil are doubting Jake's guilt, so asks Lauren to visit Jake in prison. He tries to find the taxi driver who brought Jake and Lucy back to Walford. Lauren starts to reassess Jake's guilt and joins Peter in the search for the taxi driver, believing that Jake was too drunk to have committed the murder. Max tells Lauren that he saw Jake and Lucy together on Good Friday, and claims that Jake was sober but he has not informed the police. Max also tells Abi about the altercation he had with Lucy in the car showroom and a worried Abi cleans Lucy's blood from the car showroom floor, worried it will implicate Max. Abi claims that Max was at home with her on the night of the killing. When Cora Cross (Ann Mitchell) sees this, she informs the police that Max has new information.

Emma returns to clarify Max and Abi's new statements and Max flirts with her and they have sex. Lauren tracks down Kelmendi, who tells her that Jake was too drunk to stand on the night of Lucy's death, but he refuses to make a statement to the police. Lauren realises that Max lied about Jake being sober. Peter becomes more obsessed than ever about finding Lucy's killer. Ian starts receiving several phone calls and texts from a mysterious "R". Becoming more irate, Ian tells the contact not to contact him again. It is later revealed that "R" is Rainie, who is blackmailing Ian because he was having sex with her on the night of Lucy's murder, thus confirming that Cindy was telling the truth about Ian having a false alibi.

When Lee returns to Walford, he tells his family that he saw Billy arguing with Lucy on the night she was murdered. Lee confronts Billy who confesses to stealing fish from Ian's fish and chip shop, and using a key to enter Jake's flat to steal electricity. He claims that Lucy caught him stealing the fish and threatened to tell Ian. Phil encourages Billy to go to the police and frame Peter, but Billy cannot go through with this. After Billy makes a statement, Jake is released from prison without charge. Billy faces hostility from the Beales and is also confronted by Pam Coker (Lin Blakley) who finds photographs of Lucy underneath his fridge. Billy tells her the photographs are Peter's, but later bins them after telling Pam he would return them. The police say that they are still looking for Lucy's purse and mobile phone. The police ask Ian to do a press appeal after the investigation stalls and televise new CCTV footage from the night of Lucy's death, showing her on a bus. It is discovered that on the night of her death, Lucy went to some flats to see a client who has now been eliminated from the police inquiry. Ian struggles to cope when he is hounded by the press and the police do not intervene. Phil believes that the police suspect Ian is hiding something and demands that he tell him what it is. Ian admits to Phil that he was with Rainie. The CCTV footage shows a man wearing a West Ham beanie hat getting off the bus at the same stop as Lucy. Police say they are looking for this person. Jay has the hat and burns it. Jay is questioned by the police but not charged. He and Ian's half-brother, Phil's son Ben were robbing a shop near Walford Common on the night of Lucy's death. It is revealed that Jay buried Lucy's missing purse and phone at the allotments on Ben's instructions.

Emma is removed from the case when her sexual relationship with Max is exposed. Lauren is repeatedly followed by DS Bryant acting under the orders of the head of the investigation DI Samantha Keeble (Alison Newman). Denise finds Lucy's phone and purse buried in Patrick Trueman's (Rudolph Walker) allotment. Realising what Denise has found, Jay and Ben panic and unsuccessfully try to steal them back. Denise returns the phone and purse to Ian, and fearing that Ian will turn them over to the police, Ben confesses to Ian that he found a bag containing a phone and purse abandoned on Good Friday, but denies seeing Lucy or realising that they were hers until after learning of her death. Ian phones the police, but Ben pleads his innocence and Ian decides to not report this development, asking Jane to keep the items safe. Ian scrolls through the messages on Lucy's phone and finds a pending text to Peter asking for cocaine. Ian confronts Peter upon his return from a trip to New Zealand, just as he is proposing to Lauren, and Peter admits that he had been supplying Lucy with cocaine before her death in a bid to protect her from dangerous drug dealers. Lauren rejects Peter's proposal and Ian briefly disowns Peter, but they later reconcile.

Lee views a video of Fatboy (Ricky Norwood) taken on the night of the murder and spots Lauren heading to the Beale house, contradicting her alibi. He anonymously turns over the footage to Emma, who questions Lauren. Lauren admits that she went to see Lucy, but left without seeing her. Jane later backs Lauren up, claiming to have seen her leave the Beale house without entering from a window in the Masood house. Shortly before Christmas, Jane and Ian resume their romantic relationship, and Jane proposes to Ian. They plan their wedding for February.

Although no longer a policewoman, Emma continues to study her police files. Shortly after Christmas, she seemingly cracks the case, and contacts a mystery person, telling them that she has figured out that they killed Lucy. On New Year's Day, she arranges to meet the person in the park and urges them to go to the police. The unseen person leaves and Emma sends them a text message, saying that she can't keep their secret. Distracted, Emma wanders into the road and is hit by Roxy's car. Although she initially appears to be unharmed, Emma later starts bleeding from her ear and collapses. Max takes her to the hospital, but Emma dies from her injuries.

Carol finds a grief-stricken Max tearing up Emma's file on Lucy. Lauren retrieves the papers from the bin and sets about trying to restore the torn-up pieces. A few weeks later, after proposing to Peter, Lauren finds a missing scrap of paper in her kitchen, and after putting it with the rest of the work, realises some startling information on what happened to Lucy. Deeply disturbed by her discovery, Lauren begins rejecting those around her and breaks her sobriety. Her erratic behaviour is spotted by Stacey Branning (Lacey Turner), and Lauren admits her concerns that she might be pregnant. She takes a pregnancy test, which turns out to be positive. She later shares her belief that she knows what happened to Lucy. Stacey calls the police but Lauren keeps silent about her theory, handing over Emma's files, but retaining the crucial evidence. She kicks Stacey out of her house, and breaks off her engagement to Peter.

An emotional Lauren gets a wedding card for Ian and Jane, in which she writes "I know what happened to Lucy. She died at home." She addresses the card to Jane and leaves it in the Beale house on the day of the wedding. Peter finds her, and confronts her about their break-up, but Lauren leaves, refusing to speak to him. Moments before the ceremony is due to begin, Jane finds the card and is visibly shaken. She struggles to recite her vows to Ian, but the pair eventually remarry. Elsewhere, Stacey informs Max of Lauren's discovery and he begins a frantic search across Walford to find her. Lauren returns home and plans to leave Walford, but Max arrives and tries to stop her. Abi interrupts their conversation, allowing Lauren the opportunity to escape. Abi accuses her sister of attention seeking, but Max informs her that Lauren has figured out who killed Lucy, and accuses Abi of being the killer. Abi admits that she fought with Lucy the night she died, but denies killing her, though admits wishing that she had. After learning of Lauren's pregnancy, Max races to the hospital and attempts to talk her out of having an abortion, but she sends him away. Peter also learns of Lauren's plan, and confronts her. She reveals that she has figured out that Lucy died at home.

At the wedding reception, a troubled Jane returns home. She contacts Masood, and asks him to take Bobby (now Elliot Carrington) to his house overnight. Masood is confused but noticing how distressed Jane is, agrees to look after Bobby. Ian returns home looking for Jane, while Peter return to The Vic and drags Cindy home. There, he reveals Lauren's discovery and questions the family about their involvement. Realising that Denise was home all night, Ian heads out to find her, but is sidetracked when Martin Fowler (James Bye) informs him of the discovery of Nick Cotton's (John Altman) body. Ian speaks to Dot Branning (June Brown), who confesses that she allowed Nick to die. Ian realises that Lucy may not have been killed out of hate, and tells Mick Carter (Danny Dyer) that he is putting the final pieces of the puzzle together. Peter spots Denise on the Square and accuses her of killing Lucy, but Ian intervenes and protests Denise's innocence. He then phones home and makes an ambiguous call, instructing the person to get everyone else out of the house because he has figured out what happened. When he returns, Jane is home alone. Ian demands to know what happened, and covering for Bobby, Jane lies and claims to have accidentally killed Lucy during an argument. Ian smashes up the kitchen in rage, attracting the attention of Peter and Cindy. The three confront Jane, but Ian begins to suspect that she is lying, realising that her story makes little sense.

From Masood's house, Bobby tries to contact Jane, and Ian realises that Jane is covering for him. Jane crumbles, and admits that on Good Friday, Bobby phoned her in a panic and when she came to the Beale house, she found him standing over Lucy's lifeless body. She reveals that Bobby was frustrated with Lucy for all the trouble she was causing, and after confronting her, lashed out after failing to get through to her. Jane explains that after realising what had happened, she convinced Bobby that he wasn't responsible for Lucy's death and that he is under the belief that Lucy went back out after their argument and was later killed by someone else. Jane also reveals that Emma met her on New Year's Day and was having a hard time deciding whether to reveal the truth. Peter lashes out at Jane and accuses her of betraying Lucy's memory, while Jane protests that Bobby didn't mean to hurt Lucy. They are disturbed when Cindy brings Bobby home, and after seeing his son, Ian decides to keep the circumstances of Lucy's death a secret. He forgives Jane and insists that the family all rally around and keep the secret. Peter refuses, but Cindy empathises with Jane. Hearing the commotion downstairs, Bobby comes down resulting in Peter angrily leaving. Bobby reveals to Cindy that he has kept the letter that Lucy was writing safe since learning about her death. Cindy reveals its contents to the family: Lucy wrote to Ian, telling him that she was sorry for her behaviour and that she wants to change. She tells Ian that she is going to bed, but when he returns home to wake her up so she can tell him that she loves him. An emotional Ian gathers Jane, Cindy and Bobby and the family embrace. Peter leaves the Square and moves to New Zealand with Lauren after telling her that Bobby was the one who killed Lucy and that Jane covered for him. She agrees to keep it a secret.

Five months later, the police arrest Ben on suspicion of the murder. Jane shows Ian that she has kept Lucy's phone and wallet, but they agree to keep them hidden to ensure Ben's release. However, Bobby overhears them talking about Ben, so he takes the items to the police. Phil finds him there and stops him, but later believes that Ben may have killed Lucy, so hands the items to the police himself. The Mitchells hear of this and are angry that Phil did not wipe the fingerprints off the items, and Jay believes he will also be implicated, which he is. As a result, Jay receives a three-month suspended sentence and is tagged. However, Abi then tells Phil that she believes Max may have killed Lucy, so Sharon drives her to the police station. Despite being innocent, Max hands himself in to the police. Later that day, Max is arrested and charged with Lucy's murder after her blood is found on his shoes (blood from her nosebleed which occurred when Jake hit her), and Ben is released. Ben is furious that Phil handed the items in to the police, while Stacey visits Max in prison where he reveals that he believes that Abi killed Lucy. Stacey confronts Abi, which leads to a bitter fight between the pair. Max informs Carol that Abi had attacked Lucy violently on the night of the murder, which is why he thinks she killed her. After confronting Abi, Carol visits the Beales and vows to do all she can to help Max get released from prison and find the real killer.

Jane cannot deal with her guilt as she watches Carol fall apart over Max's arrest, and begins helping her by aiding her look for a solicitor and helping her search for Cora, who has been missing for months. Jane tells Carol she knows that Max did not kill Lucy, leading to Carol becoming suspicious. Jane is adamant that she is going to confess to Carol that Bobby killed Lucy; however, Ian persuades her not to. After Bobby attempts to throw a brick through Max's car windscreen, Cindy shouts at him at home, leading to him pushing her over; she lands where Jane found Lucy dead on the night of the murder. When Abi and Carol find Cora, Jane decides she will tell Carol that Bobby killed Lucy, but when Cora says she saw Abi and Max cleaning Lucy's blood off the car lot floor after she died, Abi admits that Max and Lucy argued there and that the evidence is stacked strongly against Max. Back at the Beale household, Cindy—believing that Ian and Jane have told Carol and Abi the truth—tells her boyfriend and Carol's grandson Liam Butcher (James Forde) that Bobby killed Lucy. Cindy learns that Ian and Jane did not tell Carol, and Ian persuades Liam not to reveal the secret, arranging for Cindy and Liam to move to Devon permanently. Cindy and Liam decide not to leave Walford, and Liam attempts to call the police on Bobby, but Ian states that he and Cindy could go to prison for perverting the course of justice. Liam blackmails Ian and Jane into giving him £100,000 to leave permanently, saying he will go to Germany to live with his father, but Liam eventually agrees to leave without payment. Jane tells Ian that she intends for all the Beales to move away from Walford, but instead, Liam and Cindy leave together without Jane and the others.

Cindy sends a video message to Bobby informing him that he killed Lucy and that Jane lied. Sharon watches the message on Bobby's laptop and hides it from Bobby, and later confronts Jane about it. Eventually, Jane confirms to Sharon that Bobby killed Lucy, while Ian deletes the email. Ian pleads with Sharon to keep the information a secret for the sake of his family, but Sharon says she needs time to think about what to do. Sharon decides not to tell Phil the truth about the murder and tells Ian that she will not tell anybody. She later asks Ian and Jane what to expect at Max's trial, after hearing that Ben, Jay, Abi and Lee have all been called to give evidence, so Jane contacts Keeble. Ian, however, visits Dot, who says that she wishes she had turned her criminal son, Nick, in to the police when he was younger, so Ian takes Bobby away in the middle of the night.

The next day, Jane is frantic to discover that Ian and Bobby are nowhere to be seen, so she visits Sharon, who covers for her when Phil starts asking questions. Jane is intent on giving an alibi for Max to his lawyer Marcus Christie (Stephen Churchett)—who also has history with Phil and Sharon—however Sharon strongly advises Jane against the idea. After a day of worrying, Jane eventually decides to contact Keeble and say that she killed Lucy; however Phil grabs her from behind and stops her from answering the door to Keeble. Keeble eventually leaves, and Phil tells Jane he knows she killed Lucy. She lies that she had an argument with Lucy over drugs. Phil vents his anger over Ben's arrest, and Jane lets slip she is covering for Bobby. Phil is stunned. When Sharon arrives, she tries to convince Phil not to call the police, but when he gets his mobile phone out, Jane punches him out of desperation and expresses how much she loves Bobby. Phil and Sharon convince her to continue protecting Bobby and allow Max to stand trial, as Bobby is more important to her than Max is. Jane contacts Ian and Bobby, who are in Kent, and reveals that she will be joining them.

=== Max's trial and Kathy's return ===
Jane is stunned when Lauren returns and reveals that she knows that Bobby killed Lucy. She pleads with Lauren to stay quiet; however, Lauren is determined to have Max released. In court, Lee takes to the stand and Marcus questions his recent sacking from the army due to violent behaviour, leading to Lee breaking down in tears. However, the prosecution, Hazel Warren (Clare Higgins), points out Marcus's character assassination on Lee. Lauren then decides to tell Jane that she is informing the police of the real killer, but as she leaves the house, her waters break. The following day, Abi is questioned in the docks, and is disgusted when she realises that Max has told Marcus about her fight with Lucy on the night she died. In pure anger, Abi lies that Max revealed to her that he killed Lucy. Abi later feels guilty and confesses to lying, and is shunned by the judge. When Lauren brings her baby Louie home, Carol tells her and Abi about how Max has always been a coward, so Lauren visits Max in prison. He reveals that he was planning to write Abi a letter of apology, and swears that Marcus forced him to confess about Abi and Lucy's fight. Lauren, seeing what Carol pointed out, urges Max to stand up for himself if he wants to prove his innocence. Max begins to suspect that Lauren knows more than she is letting on and questions her how she knows he didn't do it if she has a low opinion of him. Lauren does not answer and leaves the prison silently.

After Lauren and Abi are horrified when Max once again fails to defend Abi when accusations of her killing Lucy arise in court, Lauren warns Jane not to give evidence as planned, feeling that Max needs to defend himself. After failing to convince Carol to help Max defend himself, Marcus tries to contact Jane, who avoids him because of Lauren's warning. When the prosecution lawyer, Hazel, verbally attacks Max, Carol, who had until this point, lost faith in his innocence, finally agrees to help and encourages Marcus to interrogate him about his abusive childhood that caused his insecurities. Marcus and Jane then secretly come up with a plan to ensure Max will be found innocent. Jane then travels to court the following day and tells the jury that she and Max had sex when Lucy was murdered, though Hazel believes this is just a lie to ensure Max is found not guilty, because Jane had not mentioned this previously. Later, Jane pleads with Phil to help Max and he privately confronts the foreman of the jury in his car. The foreman later states in court that the jury have found Max guilty, which Ian briefly witnesses from outside. As a horrified Carol and Stacey protest, proclaiming his innocence, Max jumps out from his stand, punches Bryant, and quickly escapes the courthouse. Max visits Jane and realises she is covering for Bobby. When Max is rearrested, he shouts that Bobby killed Lucy but it is seen as an act of desperation. Max is sentenced to 20 years for the murder and a further 12 months for escaping lawful custody. Lauren then goes to the police and tells Bryant that it is true that Bobby killed Lucy, but Bryant does not believe her and says that Max deserves what he gets for what happened to Emma.

After returning to Walford with Bobby, Ian leaves Jane a suicide note saying he killed Lucy. When Jane finds Ian about to jump off a bridge, he tells her that this is the only way to protect everyone. However, Jane talks him down and he is then surprised to see his supposedly dead mother, Kathy Sullivan (Gillian Taylforth), on the other side of the road. Ian later tells Kathy that Bobby killed Lucy, rebuilding their trust. Jane is horrified that he told Kathy about Bobby, but Ian is confident she will not say anything to the police. Bobby protests over Ian and Jane's decision to move him into Lucy's old bedroom while Kathy moves into his bedroom. After unsuccessfully trying to swap the rooms back, Bobby pushes Jane down the stairs during a scuffle, knocking her unconscious. Jane lies to Kathy that she tripped, but Bobby tells Kathy the truth. Kathy tries to convince Jane that Bobby has anger management problems, and after Bobby later smashes a plate in anger, Jane expresses her concerns to Kathy that Bobby may well have anger issues.

Bobby and Sharon's son Dennis Rickman Jnr (Bleu Landau) start a feud, leading to Kathy telling Sharon that Bobby pushed Jane down the stairs. Sharon decides to go to the police, so Jane tells Ian of Sharon's plan. Dennis tells Bobby that he killed Lucy, having overheard it from Sharon and Phil. Sharon then has second thoughts after her father and Kathy's husband Gavin Sullivan (Paul Nicholas) tells her not to destroy a family. Bobby and Dennis go for a bike ride to Walford Common, so Phil and Ian go looking for them. They find Dennis brutally beaten, while Bobby's return home means Sharon thinks he has harmed Dennis. A distracted and drunk Phil crashes the car, leaving Phil and Ian with cuts and bruises and Dennis in a critical condition. Ian realises Phil was drunk, and when speaking to Jane, also realises Dennis must have told Bobby he killed Lucy. Ian then does a deal with Phil: stop Sharon going to the police about Bobby and Ian will say he drove the car, saving Phil's relationship with Sharon, but ending his own friendship with her. When Bobby throws his television down the stairs, he tells Ian what Dennis told him. Ian confirms that he did kill Lucy but everyone is protecting him out of love. Ian tells Jane, who decides it is time to go to the police. Bobby agrees he should face the police, but Ian decides that a private boarding school will be another way to help him, while keeping the family intact. When Phil confesses to Sharon that he was driving the car, Sharon leaves him and reconciles with Ian. Ian is able to get Bobby into boarding school early, and Bobby sees this as his punishment for killing Lucy, but he is reassured by Kathy.

=== Killer confession and Max's revenge ===
Ian decides to sell his restaurant to pay for Bobby's schooling, which causes protests when it is revealed he is selling to a supermarket chain. Because of this, Ian changes his mind and decides to take Bobby out of the school. Bobby overhears Jane talking to Sharon about this and is angry, so Bobby smashes Jane's car with his hockey stick. A day later, Jane catches Bobby packing a bag. Stating he overheard Jane's conversation with Sharon and he is going back to boarding school, he attempts to run out the front door; Jane drags him back and as she turns around to call Ian, Bobby strikes her over the head with his hockey stick, then twice more after she falls. Bobby interrupts Ian in a crowded Queen Vic and says that he has killed Jane, just like he killed Lucy. Ian, Sharon, Kathy and Ben rush to Jane's aid, and discover she is alive. The crowd in the pub wonder if Bobby is telling the truth or if he is confused. Ben realises that the family knew for some time and is angry because he was arrested for the murder, but tells Ian to get Bobby away to avoid him going to prison. Ian tells Bobby to change his bloodied shirt and they leave as paramedics arrive. However, Mick stops Ian leaving, as he recalls his earlier conversation with Ian and realises that Ian knew Bobby killed Lucy. Mick convinces Ian to return to Jane, and Ian does not allow Bobby in the ambulance. While being questioned about the attack on Jane, Bobby confesses to killing Lucy. Keeble is reluctant to reopen the case, having put a lot of effort into convicting Max; however, when Bobby reveals where the murder weapon is, Bobby is charged with unlawful killing and remanded into custody. Despite Ian's pleas, Jane decides to end their marriage, believing that the Beale family are better off without her and fearing she may be paralysed following Bobby's attack. Bobby is later sentenced to three years in prison for Lucy's murder.

Max is due to have a hearing to be released from prison following Bobby's confession, so Abi and Lauren write a letter to reconcile with him and to meet in The Queen Vic which they give to Stacey, who goes to the court. However, after being released, he posts it back through the letterbox and gets into a taxi as he is still unwilling to forgive them. Lauren tries to run after the taxi, but Max ignores her. Bobby pleads guilty in court and is sentenced to three years for killing Lucy, and one year for GBH upon Jane, to be served concurrently. He is then sent to a young offenders institute to serve his sentence. Upon hearing Ian saying he should have done more for Bobby when he found out the truth, Keeble asks Ian when he found out. He admits that it was on his wedding night, and Keeble opts not to charge him for perverting the course of justice, feeling that everyone has made mistakes in the murder investigation and that Ian has suffered enough. Bobby feels confident he can be released when Ritchie informs him of potential to appeal, but following Jane's wishes, Ian convinces Bobby to avoid doing so, saying that he needs to accept what he did and carry out his punishment like he deserves. Shortly afterwards, Ian receives a threatening note from Max – saying that he will never forget what Ian did.

On Christmas Day 2016, Max returns to Albert Square and makes amends with his family; he also apparently forgive Phil and the Beales as well for what they did to him. In 2017, however, it slowly becomes clear that Max is seeking revenge against the square for his wrongful imprisonment – with Phil and Ian being his particular targets for causing his conviction. Max's vengeful plot sees him perpetuate the events of his brother Jack (Scott Maslen) losing custody of his stepson Matthew Mitchell Cotton to the latter's father, Charlie Cotton (Declan Bennett); and blackmailing Steven before causing his death whilst attempting to kill Jane, whom Max then coerces into leaving the square. It soon transpires that Max is working in cahoots with James Willmott-Brown (William Boyde), a corrupt businessman who previously raped Kathy back in 1988 and the CEO of Albert Square's business company known as "Weyland & Co" – initially named "Grafton Hill". During the course of Max's revenge, he has been conspiring with Willmott-Brown in his scheme called "Project Dagmar" – wherein Weyland & Co would redevelop the square by overtaking many properties before later demolishing them for the purpose of building luxurious flats; this is revealed to be part of Willmott-Brown's own revenge against the square for wronging him in the past as well as attempting to recoup his obsessive crush on Kathy, all the while Max's collaboration was all to exact revenge for being wrongfully imprisoned for Lucy's murder. Following the revelation of their conspiracy, Max helps Willmott-Brown put his scheme into fruition before eventually getting betrayed. As Willmott-Brown finalises his development in taking over Walford, Max grows distant from his family when they learn about his revenge plot against the community. The aftermath of Max's betrayal quickly sees him spiral out of control, especially when he tries to kill both Ian and Phil when they learn about his plot. By Christmas 2017, Max has lost everyone and decides to commit suicide – but stands out at the last second before Lauren and Abi both end up falling off the roof while trying to talk their father out of suicide. Lauren survives the fall, but Abi dies later in hospital – though not before her and Steven's daughter, Abi, is born prior to her death. Before Abi's death and subsequent funeral, Max partly helps the community regain their lost properties when Willmott-Brown's scheme ultimately fails and he is later hospitalised after suffering a heart attack.

=== Aftermath in later years ===
Sixteen months later, Ian receives a letter saying that Bobby (now played by Clay Milner Russell) will be released in a matter of months, but he believes that Bobby will be better off with Jane; however, Kathy encourages Ian to tell Peter that Bobby is coming home and to be a father to Bobby and bring him back to Walford. Bobby is later released from prison and greeted by Kathy at home; however, he is suffering from a mental illness which has led him to experience hallucinations of his deceased half sister. He is not welcomed by other residents due to what he and his family did to Max that caused his revenge towards the residents, Steven's death, Jane's departure and ruined his relationships with his daughters, causing Abi's death and Lauren's refusal to return to Walford. Max soon realises that Bobby is a scared child and remorseful for his actions, so welcomes him to the community. Bobby meets with Imran (Reda Elazouar), a friend from the Young Offenders Unit, who gifts Bobby a Quran and a prayer mat because he is converting to Islam. Bobby begins working at his father's restaurant, where he befriends Iqra Ahmed (Priya Davdra). After realising that Bobby has converted, she invites him to the Eid Mubarak celebrations at her house.

In 2023, the music box murder weapon resurfaced in possession of Anna Knight (Molly Rainford), who alongside her father George Knight (Colin Salmon) and sister Gina Knight (Francesca Henry) was one of the new occupants of the Queen Vic. It was later revealed that Cindy Beale (Michelle Collins) was George's ex-wife and mother to the girls, having had her death faked after being placed into witness protection 25 years earlier. Cindy had suffered a mental breakdown following Lucy and Steven's deaths and had walked out on her new family before reconnecting with Ian and Peter and moving to France. Later, Cindy, Ian and Peter return to Walford, where Cindy confronts Bobby over killing Lucy and is hostile towards him.

== Reception ==
Kevin O'Sullivan described the storyline as a "clapped-out whodunit" but other critics were more positive. Kerry Barrett from All About Soap praised the start of the storyline, calling it "Emotional, heart-wrenching, devastatingly sad and—at times—a little bit uncomfortable to watch." Grace Dent argued that the storyline marked the beginning of a "golden era" for the show, stating that "EastEnders does death with grand aplomb". Katy Brent described the scene in which Phil Mitchell (Steve McFadden) comforts a grief-stricken Ian Beale (Adam Woodyatt) as "absolutely heartbreaking" and described Woodyatt as "one of the best [actors] in soap"

EastEnders also achieved 8.18 million (34.6%) viewers on Easter Monday 2014 in overnight figures. which increased to 8.4 million (overnight) the following evening, when the entire Beale clan learnt of Lucy's death. When full viewing figures were released, EastEnders was watched by 9.09 million viewers on Easter Monday followed by 9.06 million tuning in on the Tuesday.

The episode in which the Beales discover that Lucy has been murdered was nominated for the "Best Single Episode" award at the 2014 British Soap Awards under the title, "Lucy's Death: The Aftermath", but lost the award to rival soap Coronation Street's "Hayley's Death" episode. The storyline was nominated for "Best Soap Storyline" at the 2014 TV Choice Awards and "Best Storyline" at the 2014 Inside Soap Awards, but lost out on both. It won "Best Soap Storyline" at the 2014 Digital Spy Reader Awards, and "Best Storyline" at the 2015 British Soap Awards. At the same award ceremony, the live episode in which the Beales discover that Bobby killed Lucy also won "Best Single Episode".
