= Lucy Beale =

Fictional character from EastEnders

- EastEnders character
- Hetti Bywater as Lucy Beale (2012)
- Portrayed by: Eva Brittin-Snell (1993–1996); Casey Anne Rothery (1996–2004); Melissa Suffield (2004–2010); Hetti Bywater (2012–2015); Uncredited (2019–2020)
- Duration: 1993–2010, 2012–2015, 2019–2020
- First appearance: Episode 926; 16 December 1993
- Last appearance: Episode 6072; 31 January 2020
- Introduced by: Leonard Lewis (1993); Bryan Kirkwood (2012); Dominic Treadwell-Collins (2015); Jon Sen (2019)
- Spin-off appearances: EastEnders: E20 (2010); The Ghosts of Ian Beale (2014)
- Melissa Suffield as Lucy Beale (2010)
In-universe information
- Occupation: Student; Waitress; Chip shop worker; Company director; Estate agent
- Family: Beale
- Father: Ian Beale
- Mother: Cindy Beale
- Stepmother: Mel Owen; Laura Beale; Jane Beale
- Brothers: Peter Beale
- Half-brothers: Steven Beale; Bobby Beale
- Half-sisters: Cindy Williams; Gina Knight; Anna Knight
- Grandfathers: Pete Beale
- Grandmothers: Kathy Beale; Bev Williams
- Uncles: Ben Mitchell; David Wicks
- Aunts: Gina Williams; Donna Ludlow
- Nephews: Louie Beale; Jimmy Beale
- Nieces: Beth Williams; Abi Branning
- First cousins: Bianca Jackson; Joe Wicks; Lexi Pearce
- Other relatives: Pauline Fowler; Martin Fowler

Lucy Beale is a fictional character from the BBC soap opera EastEnders. The character was played by Eva Brittin-Snell, Casey Anne Rothery, Melissa Suffield, and Hetti Bywater. Lucy was introduced in December 1993 as the daughter of Ian (Adam Woodyatt) and Cindy Beale (Michelle Collins). She was the twin sister of Peter Beale (Thomas Law/Ben Hardy), and half-sister of Steven Beale (Aaron Sidwell), Cindy Williams (Mimi Keene), Bobby Beale (Eliot Carrington/Clay Milner Russell), Gina Knight (Francesca Henry), and Anna Knight (Molly Rainford).

From 2004, when the role was recast to the older Suffield, storylines featuring Lucy focused upon her teenage rebellion. In 2010, Suffield left EastEnders, after she was allegedly axed due to "unruly behaviour." On 14 November 2011, it was announced Lucy would be returning in 2012 with Bywater taking over the role. She returned on 12 January 2012. Her storylines have included teenage pregnancy, abortion, cheating in her exams, struggling to cope when Ian has a mental breakdown and runs away, feuding, taking over Ian's businesses, and multiple relationships, including an affair with her best friend Lauren's (Jacqueline Jossa) father, Max Branning (Jake Wood).

On 21 February 2014, it was announced that Lucy would be murdered, starting a dark chapter for the Beale family and a whodunit storyline that would run until the show's 30th anniversary in February 2015 when the identity of the murderer would be revealed. The "Who Killed Lucy Beale?" storyline was billed as the soap's biggest whodunnit, and was EastEnders' biggest marketing campaign to date. Bywater returned in a flashback episode on 19 February 2015 to explore unanswered questions about the night Lucy died. The same episode revealed that Lucy's 10-year-old half-brother Bobby was her killer, after 10 months of secrecy regarding her demise. The character reappeared as hallucinations in 2019 and 2020, portrayed by a body double and using archive footage.

== Casting and development ==
As a baby and toddler, Lucy was played by Eva Brittin-Snell for the first three years. Casey Anne Rothery took over the role in 1996 and played Lucy for nearly eight years. In August 2004 it was announced that Rothery, along with Joseph Shade, who played Lucy's twin brother Peter Beale, had been axed from EastEnders as producers were looking to mature the characters. The actors were told days before filming their final scenes that they would be leaving. Rothery's family were said to be furious, with a family friend telling The People, "It was a bolt out of the blue. She is devastated and has been in tears. To be booted out without any warning is a real kick in the teeth. She rang her dad in tears. He phoned soap bosses to complain and they admitted they could have handled things a lot better." An EastEnders spokesperson said, "Joseph and Casey Anne have done a fantastic job. They're written into EastEnders' history and everyone will miss them." Casey's final episode aired on 21 September 2004. It was later announced that young actress Melissa Suffield would take over the role, and she first appeared on 28 October 2004. In March 2010, Suffield said that she wished "people didn't think I was like [Lucy] in real life because I'm not."

In 2010, Lucy was involved in a pregnancy storyline, on which Suffield said "I'm excited about the storyline because it's something brilliant to get my teeth into. I love playing 'bitch Lucy', but you'll soon see a completely different side to her." The storyline involved Lucy offering to have the baby so that it could be brought up by Ian and her step mother Jane (Laurie Brett). An Albert Square insider said: "Lucy's run rings around her father Ian and stepmum Jane for years. Lucy falls pregnant just at a time when Jane's desperate for a child of her own. Jane believes that the baby could be the solution to her dream of having a baby with Ian.

In May 2010 it was announced that Suffield had been axed from the show allegedly due to "unruly behaviour" off-set. In June it was reported that the character would be recast. Suffield left the show on 27 August 2010. In February 2011 an EastEnders spokesperson said that no decision on Lucy's recasting had been made.

On 14 November 2011, it was announced the character would be returning to EastEnders in January 2012 with Hetti Bywater taking over the role. Of her casting, Bywater said "I'm really excited to be joining such an iconic show as EastEnders, especially becoming part of the Beale household. I'm looking forward to find out what's in store for Lucy and seeing what she's going to get up to when she returns to Walford." After seeing Bywater's first episode, Melissa Suffield said that she has moved on from EastEnders and also wished Bywater good luck in the role. Bywater expressed that she would like Peter Beale to return to the show, with Thomas Law playing him.

=== Departure and cameo appearances ===
On 21 February 2014, it was revealed that Hetti Bywater would leave the show, ending in a "raw", "emotional" and "gritty" storyline, with the character being killed off in the spring. The storyline was somewhat foreshadowed by new executive producer Dominic Treadwell-Collins stating at an EastEnders press event in December 2013 that "there's a big, big Beale story that will hit around Easter and keep going until the anniversary." Treadwell-Collins also stated that it would give Adam Woodyatt (who plays Lucy's father Ian Beale) "a big chance to shine" throughout the storyline. In the episode dated 18 April 2014, Lucy's lifeless body lay on Walford Common, beginning the storyline.

It was revealed on 19 February 2015 that Lucy was in fact killed by her younger brother, Bobby. Ian initially believes that Jane killed her, but it is later revealed that Jane covered for Bobby by placing Lucy's body on Walford Common. Jane reveals to Ian, Peter and Cindy that Bobby is unaware he killed her, and instead believes that she was killed when she headed out later that night in a mugging.

The character of Bobby was reintroduced in 2019, having been imprisoned for Lucy's murder for three years, with Clay Milner Russell in the role. Writers chose to explore Bobby's guilt over Lucy's murder and struggle adapting back to Walford, following his return. As part of the storyline, the character of Lucy was reintroduced for a cameo appearance. Bywater did not reprise the role for the appearance, and a body double was hired instead.

== Storylines ==
=== 1993–2010 ===
Lucy and her twin brother Peter Beale (Francis Brittin-Snell) are born off-screen on 9 December 1993, to Ian (Adam Woodyatt) and Cindy Beale (Michelle Collins). The twins are born on the same day Ian's father, Pete Beale (Peter Dean), dies in a car accident with his girlfriend, Rose Chapman (Petra Markham). In 1996, Cindy hires a hitman to kill Ian, but he survives and fearing she will be arrested, she goes on the run with Peter and her eldest son, Steven Beale (Stuart Stevens), and she is unable to get Lucy. Ian hires a private investigator, who locates Cindy in Italy and Ian, his stepfather Phil Mitchell (Steve McFadden) and Phil's brother Grant Mitchell (Ross Kemp), go to Italy and take Steven and Peter (now played by Stuart Stevens). Cindy returns to Walford with her boyfriend, Nick Holland (Dominic Taylor), and she wins custody of Steven, Lucy and Peter (now played by Joseph Shade), but is arrested for attempted murder and is remanded in custody, so the children stay with Ian. In November 1998, Cindy dies of complications after giving birth to hers and Nick's daughter Cindy Williams (Eva Wortley and Cydney Parker), who is Lucy's younger half-sister. Steven, Lucy and Peter grow up with various stepmothers: Mel Healy (Tamzin Outhwaite) splits from Ian straight after marrying him in Millennium Eve due to her finding out Lucy was not sick with cancer as initially feared and in July 2003, Ian's wife Laura Beale (Hannah Waterman) gives birth to hers and Ian's son, Bobby Beale (Kevin Curran), who is Lucy and Peter's younger half-brother, and they separate when Ian denies paternity, but she later dies in March 2004. Ian meets Jane Collins (Laurie Brett) at a fair, but Lucy and Peter struggle to bond with her due to Ian's past relationships, but are persuaded by Ian's aunt, Pauline Fowler (Wendy Richard) to give her a chance. Lucy and Peter are both picked on by twins Demi Miller (Shana Swash) and Darren Miller (Charlie G. Hawkins).

Progressing into her teens, Lucy becomes rebellious—stealing, smoking, drinking alcohol, lying, playing truant from school, being surly to Ian and Jane, and taking an interest in boys. Things worsen when Ian employs Craig Dixon (Rory Jennings) in his chip shop. Lucy and Craig are attracted to one another, and despite Craig being five years older than Lucy, they begin dating. Craig is a bad influence on Lucy, and upon discovering their relationship, Ian warns Craig away. Lucy runs away with Craig, unperturbed that he carries a gun and assaulted Patrick Trueman (Rudolph Walker). However, when he tries to press her for sex, she panics and returns to Walford, telling Ian that Craig assaulted Patrick. Craig is arrested for attempted murder; however, Lucy keeps his gun, which he had stashed in her bag.

In 2007, Lucy is contacted by a person claiming to be Cindy. It transpires that Steven (now played by Aaron Sidwell) was posing as Cindy to terrorise and kidnap Ian, blaming him for Cindy's death. Steven holds Ian hostage for weeks, while moving in with the Beale family. The situation ends when Steven accidentally shoots Jane with Craig's gun. Ian gets Steven psychiatric help and allows him to live with them, to Lucy's delight. In early 2008, Ian and Lucy argue about a destructive house party Lucy had in his absence. Lucy slaps Ian and he slaps her back; and she runs away. The Beales search for Lucy for weeks, before it is revealed that Steven has been hiding her, turning her against Ian and convincing her to move to France, so he can usurp her place in Ian's affections. Ian discovers the truth and convinces Lucy to come home and banishes Steven.

Lucy stays with Jane's brother Christian Clarke (John Partridge) briefly, has a relationship with an older boy, Olly Greenwood (Bart Edwards), decides to take the contraceptive pill and engages in blackmail to earn money. Lucy has sex with Leon Small (Sam Attwater) and gets pregnant; unaware of this, Leon dumps Lucy for Zsa Zsa Carter (Emer Kenny). Not ready to be a mother, Lucy asks Jane to adopt her baby and Jane agrees. Ian, however, is concerned that Jane manipulated Lucy to allow her to adopt the baby as she cannot have one of her own. He makes Lucy watch a video of a woman giving birth and persuades her to have an abortion. They agree to tell Jane that she miscarried.

Lucy receives excellent grades in her GCSEs, having paid Adam Best (David Proud) to help her cheat. When the school question the authenticity of her exam results, she admits that she cheated and is told to retake her final year. Lucy decides not to and goes to her grandmother Bev Williams (Diane Langton) in Devon.

=== 2012–2014 ===
Lucy returns to Walford for the funeral of Pat Evans (Pam St Clement) and is angry to find that Ian is engaged to Mandy Salter (Nicola Stapleton). Lucy dislikes Mandy and tries to stop her marrying Ian. She sabotages Mandy's wedding dress, sets her up, and tries to poison Bobby (now played by Alex Francis) against her, all unsuccessfully. Having noticed Whitney Dean's (Shona McGarty) attraction to Tyler Moon (Tony Discipline), Lucy causes trouble by upset by sleeping with him. Lucy and Whitney are antagonistic but eventually make amends because they are both friends with Lauren Branning (Jacqueline Jossa). On Mandy and Ian's wedding day, Lucy gives Ian an ultimatum: her or Mandy. She is distraught when he chooses Mandy but Mandy is unhappy and admits she does not love Ian and leaves. Ian has a nervous breakdown and disappears, leaving Bobby with Lucy. Following her father's disappearance, Lucy struggles to keep his businesses afloat and has trouble with Derek Branning (Jamie Foreman) who repeatedly steals money from the café and chip shop. Derek's son, Joey Branning (David Witts), tricks Derek to give him money, which he returns to Lucy. Joey and Lucy like each other and start dating.

Lucy decides she does not need Ian and renames the café "Cindy's". Lauren discovers that Ian is homeless but Lucy refuses to see him. Lauren's parents bring Ian back to Walford, and when Lucy opens the door, she slams it in his face. However, Sharon Rickman (Letitia Dean) convinces her to give Ian another chance and she agrees, providing that the businesses and properties are transferred to her so she will never be in that situation again. Ian agrees and signs the agreement. He eventually returns to work and Lucy promises to be there for him. Joey kisses Whitney, angering her. Eventually, Lauren urges Whitney to tell Lucy, and Lucy breaks up with Joey briefly. They reconcile, despite Joey not having feelings for her. Joey says that it will never work and leaves her. Lucy worries when she finds a lump in her breast, but it is benign.

Joey starts dating Lauren, his cousin. Lucy is jealous and splits them up by spiking Lauren's drink with vodka, making Joey believe that Lauren is drinking excessively. Lucy is opposed to Ian's plans to open a restaurant, worried he cannot cope. When Lauren applies for a job as a waitress, Lucy deliberately sets Joey up as Lauren's test customer, hoping she will fail. Although Whitney is chosen, she withdraws her application so Lauren gets the job but is soon sacked. Lucy provokes Lauren, who punches Lucy and smashes the café window. Lauren is arrested but Lucy decides not to press charges. Ian steals cheques from the business account to pay for his new restaurant; Lucy believes that Janine Butcher (Charlie Brooks) supplied the extra money. When she discovers the truth, she has a vicious row with Ian, which is interrupted by Peter's (now played by Ben Hardy) return to Walford.

Lucy gets upset when Joey insists that they do not have a future together and Ian takes advantage of this, manipulating her into signing a contract that gives control of the businesses back to him. When Lucy discovers what has happened, she and Ian argue and she goes to work for Janine. Lucy develops a rivalry with her colleague, Danny Pennant (Gary Lucy), and they use dirty tactics against each other to gain commission on their pay. However, Lucy discovers Danny is squatting in one of Janine's flats as he is homeless. Danny pleads with Lucy not to tell and she agrees but warns him that she now has power over him. Lucy is pleased when Ian invites his girlfriend, Denise Fox (Diane Parish) and Lucy's half-sister Cindy (now played by Mimi Keene) to move in. Lucy and Lauren start up their own letting agents company, called LB Lettings.

Lucy is revealed to be having a sexual affair with her best friend Lauren's father, Max. After secretly texting each other, Lucy meets with Max in a hotel and the pair sleep together. Lucy also has sex with newcomer Lee Carter (Danny Hatchard). He wants to begin a relationship but Lucy is more interested in Max who she continues to sleep with in secret. Lucy and Max have sex in a hotel again, but when Lee compliments her looks, Lucy realises that Lee cares about her and Max is just using her for sex. Lucy is devastated, however, when she sees Lee kissing Whitney. Lucy is shaken when Max shows her photographs of them kissing outside the flats and reveals that someone e-mailed them to him. Lucy swears she knows nothing about it. Ian begins to show how proud he is of Lucy and her new business, infuriating Cindy. Lucy later spots Lee and Whitney kissing again but meets him in the restaurant to have sex. Lucy breaks down, however, and Lee comforts her. Unbeknownst to Lee and Lucy, Jake sees them through the window. Cindy tells Ian that Lucy was arrested for shoplifting in Devon and is hiding something in her jewellery box. Worried, Ian and Jane open the box, and to their horror, find a bag of cocaine. After being chased out of the restaurant, Lucy angrily shouts at Ian, saying she wishes he was not her father. Ian tells Lucy that she is his favourite child but Peter overhears and leaves in shock. Lucy follows but cannot find him. Shortly after, Lucy gets a text message and leaves the Square.

The next day, Lucy's body is found on Walford Common after having been murdered the previous night. That afternoon, police officers DC Emma Summerhayes (Anna Acton) and DS Cameron Bryant (Glen Wallace) tell Ian that Lucy is dead. Ian identifies her body at Walford mortuary. Her funeral takes place, and the police continue to investigate her murder. When Peter proposes to Lauren, he confesses that he supplied drugs to Lucy. After the proposal, Lee finds a video that proves Lauren has given a false alibi.

Max, his daughters and Emma are invited for Christmas Day at Ian's. Cindy receives, as a present from a mysterious sender, Lucy's jewellery box. Who it could be and the reason why worries the Beales and their guests. Emma, no longer on the case officially, soon discovers who she thinks killed Lucy and confronts the killer. Before reporting them, Emma is accidentally run over and dies from a brain bleed. Lauren uses Emma's case notes and becomes suspicious as to who killed her. Lauren discovers Lucy was killed at home and writes this in a card to Ian and Jane.

Peter, after being told by Lauren that Lucy was killed at home, accuses Ian and Jane but Ian believes Jane is responsible, but realises that her story does not add up and that she is covering for Bobby (now played by Eliot Carrington). Jane explains that she found Lucy on the floor in the living room with Bobby holding her jewellery box—having hit her over the head—and that Bobby does not know he killed her. The Beales agree to keep it a secret from him. It also transpires that Lucy had been writing a letter to Ian shortly before Bobby hit her, telling her father to wake her when he returns home, that she has resolved to change and she loves him. Bobby gave the letter to Cindy, who gave it to Ian.

In 2016, over two years after Lucy's murder, Bobby is convicted of the crime and sentenced to three years imprisonment. Bobby (now portrayed by Clay Milner Russell) is released after three years, in 2019, and struggles with his guilt; in the Beale house, he begins seeing visions of Lucy. In 2023, it is revealed that Cindy Sr was alive all along, living in Spain with a new family in witness protection. Upon hearing of Lucy's murder, a grief-stricken Cindy had visited Walford that night, and watched Ian and Peter mourning Lucy from afar.

== Other appearances ==
Suffield appears as Lucy in the online spin-off, EastEnders: E20, in 2010, and Bywater portrays the character in the Children in Need 2014 special, "The Ghosts of Ian Beale", with other women from Ian Beale's past in a concussion-related flashback, shown on 14 November 2014. Bywater also appears as Lucy in the online exclusive clip, called "Under Suspicion", which sees Jay Brown (Jamie Borthwick) under questioning by the police.

== Reception ==
In July 2007, Gareth McLean of The Guardian lamented the lack of strong female characters in EastEnders, noting that Lucy "is yet to come into her own". Fellow Guardian critic Grace Dent commented on the repetitive nature of EastEnders storylines by comparing Lucy's relationship with Jane to the fraught mother-daughter bond between Kat (Jessie Wallace) and Zoe Slater (Michelle Ryan). Lucy was used by Jane Simon of the Daily Mirror to highlight a trend in the soap for husbands to prioritise their "Chavvy girlfriends" over their "doting wives", with the critic noting: "With Max (Jake Wood) and Rob (Stuart Laing) choosing Stacey and Dawn (Kara Tointon) over Tanya (Jo Joyner) and May (Amanda Drew), the feckless males of Albert Square are clearly voting with their, er, feet. No wonder Lucy Beale has started swigging alcopops on a park bench with a bunch of hoodies. By this time next week she'll have got herself a tattoo, a Staffordshire Bull Terrier and a chartered accountant lover."

When Lucy's brother Steven returned to the show, took Ian hostage and shot Jane, Digital Spy's Dek Hogan noted that: "Throughout all of this, credit has to be given to young Melissa Suffield whose role as Lucy has been pivotal. She's done an excellent job as the confused rebellious teenager and hints of Cindy have shone through." Suffield was nominated 'Best Child Actor' in the 2008 Digital Spy awards, but lost to Hollyoaks' Ellis Hollins.

When EastEnders embarked upon a storyline which saw Lucy's peer Whitney Dean (Shona McGarty) abused by the ephebophile Tony King (Chris Coghill), the Daily Mirror's Tony Stewart questioned whether viewers would take the plot seriously, given the "sexually precocious" nature of the soap's storylines, and the fact that only recently, Lucy, who is just a year younger than Whitney, had almost given her virginity to her older boyfriend. When Tony began to groom Lucy's friend Lauren, the Mirror's Maeve Quigley commented: "It's just a pity really that Tony didn't decide to turn his attentions to Lucy Beale instead – he would be minus a vital piece of his anatomy and his wallet by now."

The 2010 storyline in which Lucy falls pregnant and Ian tries to scare her into having an abortion by showing her a DVD of childbirth borrowed from one of his employees prompted a complaint to Ofcom from the woman featured giving birth in the footage shown, alleging "that her privacy and that of her baby son had been infringed by the broadcast of two EastEnders episodes." After investigation from Ofcom, the complaint was not upheld as the footage was in the public domain as part of a National Childbirth Trust DVD.

Bywater's portrayal of Lucy won her the 'Best Newcomer' award at the 2012 Inside Soap Awards. The episode immediately following Lucy's death earned a nomination for the "Best Single Episode" award at The British Soap Awards 2014, entitled "Lucy's death: The Aftermath".

In 2014, Matt Bramford from What to Watch put Lucy's recasting on his list of the 18 best recastings in British and Australian soap operas and called Lucy a "Teen rebel". In 2020, Sara Wallis and Ian Hyland from The Daily Mirror placed Lucy 71st on their ranked list of the best EastEnders characters of all time, calling her a troublemaker.
