= Hetti Bywater =

English former actress (born 1994)

- Born: Harriet Jessica Phoebe Bywater; 10 September 1994 (age 32); Sedlescombe, East Sussex, England
- Education: Birkbeck, University of London (BS)
- Occupation: Actor
- Years active: 2011–2017

Harriet Jessica Phoebe Bywater (born 10 September 1994) is an English former actress. She is known for portraying Lucy Beale in the BBC soap opera EastEnders, taking over the role from Melissa Suffield from 2012 until the character's murder in 2014.

== Life and career ==
Bywater was born on 10 September 1994 in Sedlescombe, East Sussex. She studied performing arts at the Theatre Workshop in Sussex, and from the ages of 13 to 15, attended Claverham Community College in Battle.

Bywater began her career in 2011 by making guest appearances in Casualty and Doctors. She also had a minor role in the St George's Day film in 2012. Later in 2012, Bywater was cast as Lucy Beale in the BBC soap opera EastEnders, taking over from Melissa Suffield. In 2014, it was announced that the character of Lucy would be murdered, introducing a whodunnit storyline ("Who Killed Lucy Beale?") that ran until the show’s 30th anniversary in February 2015, when the identity of the murderer was revealed. Although her character was killed off in 2014, Bywater returned for the flashback episode in February 2015, reprising the role.

Following her exit from EastEnders, Bywater starred as one of the main roles, Young Sally, in the short film Counting Backwards in 2014. Bywater had a guest appearance in the fourth series of Death in Paradise in 2015. Between 2016 and 2017, Bywater appeared in two episodes of the first series of the Sky One drama Delicious. In 2024, Bywater was seen working as a barmaid in a pub in Islington. She subsequently earned a Bachelor of Science in psychology at Birkbeck, University of London and, as of July 2025, was the Communications Officer for The Centre for Transforming Access and Student Outcomes (TASO) in London.

== Filmography ==
Year	Title	Role	Notes
2011	Doctors	Angelica Bater	Episode: "Jealous Girl"
2011	Casualty	Sara Barker	Episode: "A Real Shame"
2012	St George's Day	Lol's Girlfriend	Film
2012–2015	EastEnders	Lucy Beale	Regular role
2014	Counting Backwards	Young Sally	Short film
2015	Death in Paradise	Jess Chambers	Guest role
2016–2017	Delicious	Daisy	Recurring role
