= Claverham Community College =

Location
- North Trade Road; Battle, East Sussex, TN33 0HT; England; 50°54′58″N 0°28′01″E

Information
- Type: Community school
- Established: 1955
- Local authority: East Sussex
- Department for Education URN: 114584 Tables
- Ofsted: Reports
- Principal: Mr C Connor
- Staff: ~70
- Gender: Coeducational
- Age: 11 to 16
- Enrolment: c. 1250
- Capacity: 1120
- Houses: Caldbec, Montjoie, Oakwood, Santlache, Telleham
- Colours: Purple, blue, silver, red and green
- Publication: Claverham Newsletter
- Website: claverham.e-sussex.sch.uk

Claverham Community College is a comprehensive secondary school/community college in Battle, East Sussex, England. It has sports facilities such as a climbing wall, Community Sports Hall, gym, dance studio, fitness suite, and playing fields.

Claverham Community College is a mixed comprehensive school for pupils aged 11–16 and a Community College. It has approximately 1150 pupils and about 2500 associates of the College who attend adult evening classes or are members of affiliated societies.

The Community College was established in 1973 and was developed from the former Battle County Secondary School built in 1955. In school terms the College became fully comprehensive in 1976.

== History ==
The college takes its title from the Anglo-Saxon pre-conquest description of the particular area in which it is situated - place of clover or good pasture. The college opened in 1955.

== Campus ==
The college is about one mile west of the market town of Battle and is situated within 42 acres of wood and parkland.

The college grounds incorporate land which belonged formerly to the Battle Abbey Estate and are immediately adjacent to the site of the Battle of Hastings.
