= Melissa Suffield =

English former actress (born 1992)

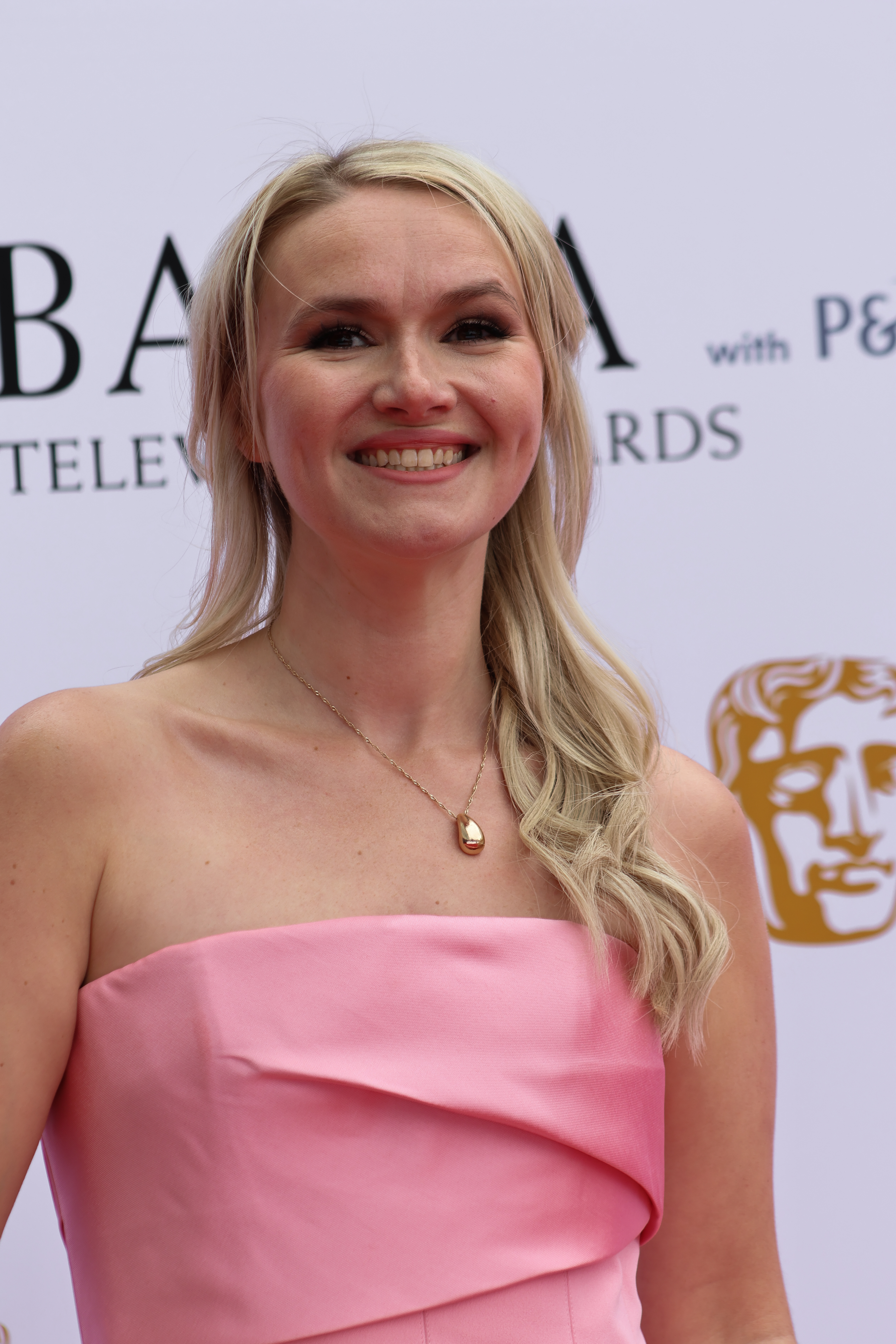
- Suffield in 2026
- Born: Melissa Holly Ivy Carter; 24 December 1992 (age 33); London, England
- Years active: 2003–2015
- Television: EastEnders (2004–2010)
- Spouse: Robert Brendan
- Children: 1

Melissa Holly Suffield (born 24 December 1992) is an English former actress known for her role in the BBC soap opera EastEnders as Lucy Beale. She appeared on the show from 2004 to 2010.

== Early life ==
Suffield was born in London in 1992 as Melissa Carter. She adopted the surname Suffield from her step-father. She attended Hatch End High School. Her first professional acting role was in an episode of the children's series Magic Grandad in March 2003. She appeared in one episode of Agatha Christie's Poirot (Five Little Pigs) and in two episodes of Chitty Chitty Bang Bang.

== Career ==
=== EastEnders ===
Suffield is best known for her appearance in television soap EastEnders, in which she played Lucy Beale, daughter of Ian Beale, a long standing character, from 2004 to 2010. She also appeared as Lucy in the 2010 spin off series EastEnders: E20. Suffield helped raise money for Children in Need in November 2007, by appearing in a special Beatles medley featuring cast members from EastEnders. She also took part in Children in Need 2008, when Suffield appeared in a West End production of Mary Poppins. She also appeared in a Motown medley for Children in Need 2009. In May 2010, it was announced that Suffield had been axed from EastEnders, after she allegedly ignored warnings about her "unruly" behaviour. On 14 November 2011, it was announced that the character would be returning to EastEnders in January 2012, with Hetti Bywater taking over the role.

=== Post-EastEnders ===
In August 2009, Suffield took part in a documentary called 16: Too Young To Vote? as part of BBC Three's Adult Season, in which she journeys around the UK to find out whether sixteen year olds should get the right to vote. In September 2009, she reported for the BBC programme Watchdog about the dangers of sunbeds. She also exposed centres that were not following guidelines by checking peoples ages. In addition, Suffield took part in a celebrity version of Total Wipeout. She has also acted in Casualty. In March 2015, she played the title role in Norma Jeane, a musical about Marilyn Monroe. In December 2019, it was reported that she had acted and directed a pantomime at Swallows Leisure Centre in Sittingbourne.

== Personal life ==
Suffield is married to cruise director Robert Brendan; they have one child together (b. 2020). They currently live on the Isle of Sheppey in Kent.

== Filmography ==
=== Television ===
Year	Title	Role	Notes
2003	Magic Grandad	Melissa	1 episode
2003	Agatha Christie's Poirot	Young Lucy	1 episode
2004–2010	EastEnders	Lucy Beale	317 episodes
2010	Little Crackers	Alison	Episode: "Julia Davis's Little Cracker: The Kiss"
2012	Casualty	Alicia Dans	3 episodes

=== Film ===
Year	Title	Role	Notes
2011	Rough and Ready II	Sammy	Television movie
2012	The App	TBA	Short film

=== Theatre ===
Year	Title	Role	Notes
2010	Olly's Prison	Sheila	Touring
2011	Beauty and the Beast	Belle	Touring
2015	Pinocchio	Cat/Blue fairy	Secombe Theatre, Sutton
