= Laurie Brett =

Scottish actress (born 1969)

- Born: 28 March 1969 (age 57); Hamilton, Lanarkshire, Scotland
- Occupation: Actress
- Years active: 1993–present
- Known for: EastEnders; Waterloo Road
- Spouse: Dennis Longman (m. 2019)
- Partner(s): Dave Evans (2001–2007); John Milroy (2009–2014)
- Children: 1

Laurie Brett (born 28 March 1969) is a Scottish actress, best known for her roles as Jane Beale in the BBC One soap opera EastEnders and Christine Mulgrew in the BBC One drama series Waterloo Road.

== Early and personal life ==
Brett was born in Hamilton, Lanarkshire, and studied at the London Studio Centre. She is fluent in Spanish. Brett has admitted to being a "wild child" in her youth and drinking heavily for 20 years.

Brett speaks with a Scottish accent; however, on moving to London, she adopted a London accent – fitting for her EastEnders role. She says she has always had a "knack" with accents and has admitted that prior to appearing in Waterloo Road speaking with a Scottish accent became very handy when people would ask if she was Jane from EastEnders. She has admitted that when asked that question she would then reply in her native Scottish accent and people then assumed they were mistaken.

Brett was in a relationship with musician Dave Evans for six years. The couple met on a blind date in 2001 and later got engaged; however, the relationship ended in 2007. Brett revealed in January 2011 that she was pregnant with her first child. She gave birth to Erin Anne Millie Brett in May 2011.

== Career ==
Young Brett enjoyed drama in her youth, but she needed an Equity card to be a paid professional actress in the UK, she replied to an advert in The Stage and joined Circo Magico Italiano, a travelling circus, at the age of 17 in Mexico and Central America.

Her first television role was as the officer manager in London's Burning (1993). She later appeared in The Bill in two roles: as Emma Gilmore (1996) and Irene Murray (1998), and also in My Hero (2002) playing a female customer. . On her return, she appeared in various productions on London's West End Stage, including playing a prostitute in Les Misérables, appeared in the UK Tour of The Rocky Horror Show as Magenta, starring alongside Jason Donovan as Frank, and appeared in the musical Smokey Joe's Cafe.

After being spotted in Les Misérables by EastEnders casting director Kat Collins, she was given the part of Jane Beale. She made her first appearance in June 2004, and initially signed a three-year contract, renewed in 2007. In 2010, she signed a further one-year contract. She also appeared as Jane in the 2010 spin-off series EastEnders: E20. In May 2011, Brett left the soap briefly on maternity leave. It was revealed that she would return to her role in November 2011. In January 2012, her character departed from EastEnders. Brett briefly reprised her role in January 2014, and returned permanently later in November. Brett departed EastEnders again in 2017; her final episode aired on 23 October 2017. Brett reprised the role for a short stint seven years later, with Jane making an unannounced return on 15 July 2024.

On 15 March 2012, it was announced Brett would be joining the BBC's ongoing drama Waterloo Road as Christine Mulgrew, a new English teacher hired by headmaster Michael Byrne (Alec Newman). For the first time in Brett's career, she spoke in her native accent as the show had relocated to Scotland. Brett's character then took over as acting headteacher at the end of the eighth series and was appointed as permanent headteacher at the beginning of series 9. Brett continued to appear in Waterloo Road in the second half of series 9, despite her return to EastEnders. Brett confirmed via Twitter that she will continue filming on Waterloo Road in late spring 2014 and stayed in the role until the show ended.

On 24 December 2018, Brett took part in a one-off celebrity special of All Together Now, and was crowned winner after receiving a score of 92. In January 2020, Brett starred as DC Gemma Darlington in the C4 crime drama Deadwater Fell. Then in 2022, she joined the cast of the BBC drama series Shetland.

== Filmography ==
Year	Title	Role	Notes
1993	London's Burning	Officer manager	Series 6: Episode 5
1996	The Bill	Emma Gilmore	Series 12: Episode 95: "Reminder"
1998	The Bill	Irene Murray	Series 14: Episode 6: "Forgive and Forget"
2002	My Hero	Female customer	Series 3: Episode 8: "Mine's a Double"
2004–2012, 2014–2017, 2024	EastEnders	Jane Beale	Regular role; 1,098 episodes
2010	EastEnders: E20	Jane Beale	Series 1: Episode 2
2010	East Street	Jane Beale	Charity crossover between Coronation Street and EastEnders
2012–2015	Waterloo Road	Christine Mulgrew	Regular role; 69 episodes
2018	All Together Now	Herself	Winner
2019	London Kills	Corinna Richardson	Series 1: Episode 4: "Sex Games"
2019–2020	Traces	Izzy Alessi	
2020	Deadwater Fell	DC Gemma Darlington	
2021	Casualty	Gail Donham	Series 35: Episode 14
2022	Shetland	Alison Woods	Main role
2025	Casualty	Maria Mayhew	Series 39: Episode 11
