= Stephen Odubola =

English actor

Stevie Odu
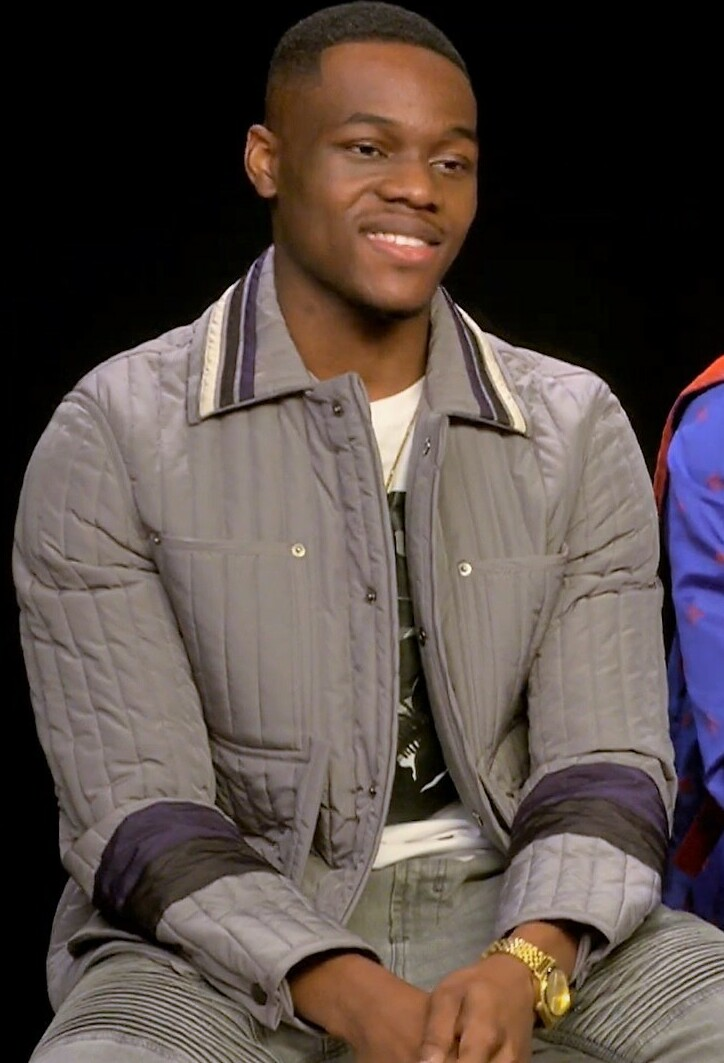
- Odubola in 2019
- Education: Identity School of Acting
- Occupation: Actor
- Years active: 2014–present
- Notable work: Blue Story (2019)
- Television: Boiling Point (2023)

Stephen Odubola also known as Stevie Odu is a British actor from London, England. His films include Blue Story (2019) and his television roles include the BBC One series Boiling Point (2023).

== Early life ==
Odubola grew up in Kennington, in South London, to Nigerian parents. When he was 16 years old, he briefly worked in the hospitality box at Chelsea's football stadium, Stamford Bridge. The son of Nigerian parents, he attended Identity School of Acting in London, before earning a degree in Business Entrepreneurship and Innovation.

== Career ==
In 2019, he played Timmy in Rapman and Paramount Pictures film Blue Story. He and Micheal Ward starred as two friends set on opposite sides of a gang-war in South London. Following that, Odubola appeared in the role of Marcus Wainwright in A Violent Man, alongside Jason Flemyng, and as Kevin Brodey in the Netflix adaptation of The Sandman.

In 2023, he portrayed a struggling father and chef in the BBC One London restaurant kitchen drama series Boiling Point. That year, he could also be seen as Ash in the George Amponsah film Gassed Up, which premiered at the 2023 BFI London Film Festival. He has an upcoming role in thriller series Embassy for MGM+.

== Filmography ==
Film
Year	Title	Role	Notes
2019	Blue Story	Timmy	
2023	Gassed Up	Ash	

Television
Year	Title	Role	Notes
2020	Holby City	Owen Gayle	1 episode
2022	A Violent Man	Marcus Wainright	
2022	The Sandman	Kevin Brodey	1 episode
2023	Boiling Point	Johnny	4 episodes
2025	Death in Paradise	Karlus Brice	1 episode
TBA	Embassy†	TBA	Filming
