= Supacell =

2024 British television series

- Genre: Action-adventure; Crime drama; Superhero
- Created by: Rapman
- Written by: Rapman
- Directed by: Rapman; Sebastian Thiel
- Starring: Tosin Cole; Nadine Mills; Eric Kofi-Abrefa; Calvin Demba; Josh Tedeku; Adelayo Adedayo
- Theme music composer: Sillkey
- Country of origin: United Kingdom
- No. of series: 1
- No. of episodes: 6

Production
- Executive producers: Anna Ferguson; Steve Searle; Mouktar Mohammed
- Producers: Joanna Crow; Mark Hedges; Sheila Nortley
- Cinematography: Sam Heasman; Aaron Reid
- Running time: 46-59 minutes
- Production companies: It's a Rap; New Wave Energy

Original release
- Network: Netflix
- Release: 27 June 2024 – present

Supacell is a 2024 British superhero television series, created and written by Rapman for Netflix. It was directed by Rapman and Sebastian Thiel, and features an ensemble cast, including Tosin Cole, Nadine Mills, Eric Kofi-Abrefa, Calvin Demba, Josh Tedeku and Adelayo Adedayo. Set in modern-day South London, the series is about a group of five ordinary Black British people, unified by family history of sickle cell disease. The sickle cell issues manifest as a super cell ("supacell") in their bodies when they unexpectedly develop superpowers, and this leads to them being pursued by a secret organization that intends to control them.

The series was a difficult sell to US broadcasters, and was rejected by HBO, ABC, and FX. Netflix picked it up in late 2019, ahead of the release of Rapman's feature-length film debut Blue Story. The development and writing process took place during the COVID-19 pandemic in 2020 and filming took place between July 2022 and April 2023 in the South London boroughs of Southwark, Lewisham and Bexley. The series explores themes such as knife crime, racial profiling, poverty, and the exploitation of Black bodies.

Supacell premiered on 27 June 2024 and received positive reviews from critics. In August 2024, the series was renewed for a second season.

== Premise ==
Five Black people from South London (a delivery driver, a gang leader, a nurse, a financially-struggling father, and a drug dealer) are unified by a family history of sickle cell disease and unexpectedly develop superpowers. They discover each other and fend off entrapment by a secret organisation seeking to control them.

== Cast ==
=== Main cast ===
- Tosin Cole as Michael Lasaki-Brown, a delivery driver, and a super with the ability to teleport and manipulate time
- Nadine Mills as Sabrina Clarke, a young woman living with her sister, and a super with the ability of telekinesis
- Eric Kofi-Abrefa as Andre Simpson, a financially struggling father, and a super with the ability of super strength
- Calvin Demba as Rodney Cullen, an inexperienced teenage drug dealer, and a super with the ability of super speed
- Josh Tedeku as Tazer, the leader of the Tower Boys gang, and a super with the ability of invisibility
- Adelayo Adedayo as Dionne Ofori, Michael's fiancée – present when he first manifests his power

=== Supporting cast ===
- Eddie Marsan as Ray, a leading member of the organization hunting down the supers
- Ky-Mani Carty as AJ Simpson, Andre's teenaged son
- Ghetts as Krazy, a powerful drug lord who faces off against Tazer. (Season 1)
- Mickira Oji as Skreamer, Tazer's Tower Boys lieutenant – the first friend he reveals his secret to
- Rayxia Ojo as Sharleen Clarke, Sabrina's sister – present when she first manifests her power
- Michael Salami as Gabriel, Michael's friend – the first he reveals his secret to
- Giacomo Mancini as Spud, Rodney's friend – the first he reveals his secret to

== Production ==
=== Development and writing ===
Rapman's plans to write a superhero series were first publicised in November 2019, during the promotion of his first feature-length film Blue Story. When asked by actor Junior Afolabi Salokun, who appeared in both Blue Story and Supacell, about what he would like to write next, Rapman responded with "I want to do a sci-fi one day. I could do something like a Misfits but a bit deeper. Like imagine someone from where we came from [South London] gets powers? Like real powers, like what would man really do with that power?"

The series was a difficult sell to US broadcasters, such as HBO, ABC, and FX, who all rejected it. During a dinner with some UK Netflix executives where Rapman pitched ideas for several shows, such as an untitled football-centric series, Supacell was successfully commissioned. He began writing the series during the COVID-19 pandemic, following the cancellation of his planned second film American Son, a remake of the 2009 French film A Prophet, starring Russell Crowe and Stephan James, for Paramount Pictures, as a result of the pandemic, and in November 2021, the series was announced in November 2021 with Mouktar Mohammed and Henrietta Lee of New Wave as executive producer and associate producer, respectively. Also executive producing are Anna Ferguson and Steve Searle of Netflix with Mark Hedges as series producer. In August 2024, Netflix renewed the series for a second season.

=== Casting ===
In August 2022, Tosin Cole was announced in the lead role along with a cast that included Adelayo Adedayo, Nadine Mills, Eric Kofi-Abrefa, Calvin Demba, Josh Tedeku, Rayxia Ojo and Giacomo Mancini. It was later revealed that Eddie Marsan had joined the cast as Ray.

=== Filming ===
Filming took place between 4 July and 10 December 2022 in South and South East London. Filming locations included Thamesmead, Peckham, Bermondsey and Deptford. It was reported that the production was using a specialised Arri 35 camera which has been designed to show Black skin in the best and most complimentary way. Filming had wrapped by April 2023.

Filming on the second series took place in October 2025.

== Episodes ==
No.	Title	Directed by	Written by	Original release date
1	"Michael"	Rapman	Rapman	27 June 2024
2	"Tazer"	Rapman	Rapman	27 June 2024
3	"Sabrina"	Sebastian Thiel	Rapman	27 June 2024
4	"Andre"	Sebastian Thiel	Rapman	27 June 2024
Sabrina resolves to turn herself in from the Onyx murder, but the police say there was no murder reported, and Sabrina finds the body missing. Andre makes a dangerous decision to rob a local gang hideout after the local bailiffs pay him a visit. Rodney's business slows down, and Dionne meets the mother of a missing girl, Jasmine. Her parents tell Dionne she was taken and has the power to heal. Dionne figures out that agents are kidnapping Black individuals who show powers and that all of them have parents who have sickle cell disease. Spud is taken and beaten up by the Sixes for selling weed. Michael finds Sabrina by using the names on packages and resolves to go with Sabrina and Shar, but his mom has a sickle cell flare-up, and he teleports away to help her. The other four all converge on the gang hideout- Andre to steal the money, Sabrina to protect Shar as she buys weed, Rodney to find his friend Spud, and Tazer to kill Krazy and the Sixes. The four encounter each other and flee separately after fighting with their powers.
5	"Rodney"	Sebastian Thiel	Rapman	27 June 2024
Rodney visits his mum, who is married to a racist white man, and she refuses to let him stay with her. With his best friend in hospital, Rodney has a change of heart. Michael resolves to tell Dionne everything, but Rodney comes to him, saying he wants to help find the others before he can. Andre is recovering after his encounter with the others while Michael and Rodney try to locate him. Sabrina is promoted at work, while Krazy physically assaults Shar. Sabrina realizes that Shar is now missing. Tazer and his gang are resolved to take down Krazy's gang, and Tazer assaults the girl who set them up with the Sixes while also following his family. Dionne is told by Jasmine's parents where the hooded men are taking superhumans, and they explain that Jasmine was taken and can heal others with her power. Tazer and his gang are pulled over by the police but Tazer escapes by becoming invisible. Andre is attacked by one of the hooded men who matches his strength and he is apprehended by them. Sabrina, Michael, and Rodney meet up, realizing that Shar and Andre may have been taken by the same people. Tazer is also attacked by the hooded men but escapes with the help of Sabrina, Michael, and Rodney.
6	"Supacell"	Rapman	Rapman	27 June 2024
Dionne finds the abandoned Ashington Estate where the hooded men are based and travels there, and Michael teleports to her. Michael finally tells Dionne what he saw in the future. Andre is taken by the hooded men, and it is explained to him that superpowers are a mutation of sickle cell they've deemed "supacell", and the Organization offers him a job to bring in others with supacell. Michael explains what he saw in the future to Sabrina, Rodney, and Tazer. Krazy calls and threatens Tazer. The stakes are high as Tazer and Sabrina both search for Krazy, who instructs them to meet him at A-Town (aka the Ashington Estate) that night. Rodney and Sabrina also converge on A-Town. Sabrina, Rodney and Michael confront Krazy and the Sixes, and Tazer arrives as well. Krazy reveals he is a supacell as well and has the power to replicate others' powers, and more hooded men arrive. It is revealed that all of the hooded individuals also have supacell powers, including Andre. In the ensuing fight, Krazy tries to kill them all, but Michael rewinds time and stops him. A stray bullet then hits Dionne and kills her; Michael does not have enough power left to rewind time again and wails as she dies. Some time later, the five gather and Michael tells them his intention to go to the future to find out more and get revenge against the Organization. Shar is revealed to be captured by the Organization, thinking she was the one with powers. The boss of the Organization is revealed to be the manager of the sickle cell treatment center Michael's mother is in treatment at, and orders Krazy killed before stating that the Organization would now do things her way.

== Release ==
The first season of the series was released on Netflix on 27 June 2024.

In August 2024, the series was renewed for a second season.

== Reception ==
On the review aggregator website Rotten Tomatoes, 100% of 20 critics' reviews are positive, with an average rating of 7.7/10. The website's consensus reads: "Finding a fresh approach to the superhero genre, Supacell works as both a savvy social commentary and satisfying entertainment." Metacritic, which uses a weighted average, assigned the series a score of 71 out of 100, based on 12 critics, indicating "generally favorable" reviews.

Leila Latif of The Guardian awarded the first episode four out of five stars, dubbing it "an absolute riot, strikingly performed and bracingly plotted". Aramide Tinubu of Variety praised the series' unique perspective on the genre with its characters and settings, remarking "Supacell considers how individualism has caused fractures in Western societies, specifically in Black communities that previously thrived because of collectivity. The show also reflects on why our dependence on technology undoubtedly comes at a cost".

The series has raised awareness of life with sickle cell disease.

== Accolades ==
In March 2025, it was nominated for Best Drama Series at both the Royal Television Society Programme Awards and the British Academy Television Awards. At the 2025 British Academy Television Craft Awards, it won Best Scripted Casting.
