= Nadine Mills =

British actress

- Occupation: Actress
- Known for: Lead role in Supacell (2024)

Nadine Mills is a British actress, best known for her role as the nurse Sabrina Clarke in Rapman's Netflix series Supacell (2024).

== Early life and education ==
Nadine Mills studied drama at college before completing a degree in media from the University of Westminster.

== Career ==
In 2024 Mills starred as the nurse Sabrina Clarke, one of the leading roles in Rapman's Netflix series Supacell. She has previously performed smaller roles in The Weekend (2016), The Strangers (2019), and The Pay Day (2022), and a made a guest appearance in Sliced.

== Filmography ==
=== Film ===
Year	Title	Role	Notes
2011	Drink, Drugs and KFC	Montana	
2013	Sable Fable	Baker Clarke	
2024	Supacell	Sabrina Clarke	
