= Josh Tedeku =

British actor

- Born: Joshua Kwabena Banin Tedeku; March 2003 (age 23)
- Education: Burnt Mill Academy
- Occupation: Actor
- Years active: 2019–present
- Television: Boarders, Supacell

Joshua Kwabena Banin Tedeku (born March 25, 2003) is a British actor. On television, he is known for his roles in Rapman's Netflix superhero series Supacell and the BBC Three coming-of-age teen comedy-drama Boarders (both 2024).

== Early life and education ==
Joshua Kwabena Banin Tedeku was born in March 2003 and grew up in Essex. He is of Ghanaian heritage. He attended Burnt Mill Academy in Harlow. He won the regional final of the Jack Petchey Speak Out Challenge in 2019.

== Career ==
Tedeku first came to prominence in 2019, when he was cast for The Last Straw II. In 2021 he was in the BBC One British medical TV soap opera Doctors. He played the lead role in the 2022 science fiction television series Moonhaven produced by AMC+.

In 2023, Tedeku starred in the short film Festival of Slaps. He then played Jaheim in the BBC Three British teen drama series Boarders.

In August 2022, Tedeku was announced as a lead character in Netflix's Supacell, directed by Rapman. The series premiered on 27 June 2024.

== Personal life ==
Tedeku is a fan of Arsenal FC.

== Filmography ==
=== Television and film ===
Year	Title	Role	Notes
2019	The Last Straw II	Josh	N/A
2021	Doctors	Todd Jarrett	
2022	Moonhaven	Wish	
2023	Festival of Slaps	Young Ade	
2023	A Town Called Malice	Eddie Carter	
2024-	Boarders	Jaheim	
2024-	Supacell	Tazer	

=== Theatre ===
Year	Title	Role	Venue(s)/Production	Note
2025	Let the Whale Die		Bush Theatre - Bomb Factory Theatre Annual Showcase	
2025	Seven Eleven		Young Vic	Rehearsed reading

== Awards and nominations ==
- Breakthrough Award at the 2025 Royal Television Society Programme Awards
