= Gassed Up (film) =

2023 British feature film by George Amponsah

- Theatrical release poster
- Directed by: George Amponsah
- Screenplay by: Archie Maddocks; Taz Skylar
- Produced by: Rupert Preston; Ed Caffrey; Bart Ruspoli; Hester Ruoff; Stefan D'Bart
- Starring: Stephen Odubola
- Cinematography: Stefan Ciupek
- Edited by: Richard Ketteridge
- Music by: Henry Counsell
- Production companies: Sunrise Films; Ascendent Fox Bromantics
- Distributed by: Vertigo Releasing
- Release dates: 10 October 2023 (London Film Fest); 9 February 2024 (United Kingdom)
- Running time: 102 minutes
- Country: United Kingdom
- Language: English

Gassed Up is a 2023 British film directed by George Amponsah in his feature film debut, and starring Stephen Odubola. It is co-written by Archie Maddocks with Taz Skylar, who also appears in the film. The film premiered at the 2023 BFI London Film Festival.

== Premise ==
A member of a moped street-gang in London, Ash uses his earnings from petty thefts to support his family, but he struggles with the moral complexities of his actions when a jewellery heist alerts an Albanian crime family to his crew.

== Cast ==
- Stephen Odubola as Ash
- Steve Toussaint as Roy
- Mae Muller as Kelly
- Harry Pinero as Self
- Yung Filly as Self
- Ms Banks as self
- Taz Skylar as Dubz
- Craige Middleburg as Roach
- Jelena Gavrilovic as Shaz
- David Monteith as Mo

== Production ==
The film was greenlit by Amazon Prime Video in July 2022 to be produced by Rupert Preston and Ed Caffrey of Sunrise Films, Bart Ruspoli and Hester Ruoff of Ascendant Fox and Stefan D’Bart of Bromantics. The script was co-written by Archie Maddocks and Taz Skylar who also appears as an Albanian-born criminal. It is directed by George Amponsah. The term "gassed up"is slang for someone who has delusions of grandeur.

=== Casting ===
Stephen Odubola leads the cast. Singer and British Eurovision entrant Mae Muller was approached to work on music for the film and appears in the film in her debut acting role. The film also includes performances by YouTubers Harry Pinero, Yung Filly and Ms Banks.

== Release ==
The film premiered on 10 October 2023 at the 2023 BFI London Film Festival. The film was released in the United Kingdom on 9 February 2024.

== Reception ==
Tom Davidson in the Evening Standard praised the performance of Odubola, and some of the action shots which use GoPro cameras attached to the gang's mopeds, but considered the film to use too many cliched tropes. Kevin Maher in The Times praised the "sharp" performances and the "deceptively smart" script, but described the film as "shakiest" when developing the Albanian gangster aspects of the plot and it "diverges from the earthy amphetamine-fuelled Ken Loach energy to something far more glossy and Tinseltown-lite".

The film won the Audience Award for Best Feature at the 2023 London Film Festival.
