= The Beautiful Game (2024 film) =

Film by Thea Sharrock

- Release poster
- Directed by: Thea Sharrock
- Written by: Frank Cottrell-Boyce
- Produced by: Graham Broadbent; Peter Czernin; Anita Overland; Colin Farrell
- Starring: Bill Nighy; Micheal Ward
- Cinematography: Mike Eley
- Edited by: Fernando Stutz
- Music by: Adem Ilhan
- Production companies: Film4; Blueprint Pictures
- Distributed by: Netflix
- Release date: 29 March 2024
- Running time: 125 minutes
- Country: United Kingdom
- Language: English

The Beautiful Game is a 2024 British sports drama film directed by Thea Sharrock and written by Frank Cottrell-Boyce. The film stars Bill Nighy and Micheal Ward.

The squad of English homeless footballers, including the talented but troubled striker Vinny, are led by their coach Mal, to compete in Rome at the global annual football tournament, the Homeless World Cup. The film was released by Netflix on 29 March 2024.

== Plot ==
Former youth football trainer Mal Bradley saves Vinny from an angry parent when he interrupts a youth training session. Introducing him to his "dream team", the squad he is training for a global annual football tournament in Rome, Vinny is unimpressed.

Vinny realises they are talking about the Homeless World Cup when he stays for a meal afterwards, so insists he does not qualify and leaves. Mal follows him to his car, where he has been living. Seeing Vinny is too proud to admit his hardship, he leaves his number and goes.

The troubled Vinny regularly has flashbacks to his brief West Ham United football career and youth team. In the present, Vinny is turned away from his part-time job. Visiting his young daughter Evie, she invites him to a school special assembly, where she will talk about someone she admires. His ex, Ellie, asks him to tell Evie if he will not make it, so Vinny says he will be in Rome.

The team heads to Rome with Vinny. At the opening ceremony, he can see it is a truly international event. Vinny is assigned a room with Nathan. When he discovers he takes methadone, he freaks out that Nathan is a heroin addict. Leaving, Vinny falls asleep in a park.

In the morning, Vinny arrives to play their first match with South Africa. As they do not turn up, England gets their first victory. They were held up at their home airport as their Zimbabwe refugee has a restrictive visa.

In the England vs. Portugal match, Vinny takes them to victory. It is Japan's first year participating, so their young female coach is hard on them. After they lose their first match, as she is reprimanding them, the squad sneaks off to explore Rome.

England's Jason is smitten by the USA's Rosita, but inadvertently expresses his interest in an excessively sexual way. Inexperienced with women, he does not realise he was offensive. Jason makes amends by giving Rosita a salmon. The Japan coach apologises too and reconciles with her team.

South African coach Protasia, a nun, coerces Vinny into agreeing to a match. His teammates are unhappy about that, but when Nathan tries to talk with him, he storms off. Feeling guilty, Nathan wants to retrieve him, but the squad insists he stay. During the search, Albar, Kevin, Jason and Cal see Rome's sights. Cal finally finds Vinny and they bond over being fathers, then the others come. Everyone decides Vinny was right in supporting a rematch with South Africa.

The next day, Vinny warms up to the squad. At the match against South Africa, Nathan cannot finish it. They lose the match but play Japan and recover the points needed to make the quarter-finals. Ecstatic, they become somber upon discovering Nathan leaving due to methadone withdrawal. He will be better in the UK, where he has support.

Rosita forgives Jason and invites him for a run, on the way explaining she is a "Dreamer". As she is not a permanent US resident, she hopes to be scouted.

England beats Mexico, so goes to the quarter-finals against Italy. Albar refuses to play for political reasons, as he is a Kurd and the Italian captain is Turkmen Syrian. England "borrows" an Argentinian player, but soon Vinny is sent off the field for two minutes. Albar jumps back in, and once Vinny returns to the field, he evens the score. In the penalties round, Italy wins. Albar and the Italian captain embrace.

Afterwards, the English squad fight. Vinny defensively points out why many of them are homeless. Albar points out that he is a refugee barber, then offers to give everyone a shave. When Evie calls Vinny to say her school presentation was on him in the Homeless World Cup, mortified and humiliated, Vinny leaves.

Over dinner with the Italian director of the Cup Gabriella, Mal explains he scouted Vinny while in West Ham's youth training. As being cut makes Vinny see himself as a loser, Mal is hoping to help him.

The next morning, although Vinny is too late for the USA match, they still win. Rosita is also college-scouted and named most valuable player. Vinny substitutes for South Africa, thanks to Protasia, helping them win the gold.

Mal shows Vinny he scouted him as a child. With his confidence returned, Vinny helps to motivate the next year's team.

== Cast ==
- Bill Nighy as Mal
- Micheal Ward as Vinny
- Valeria Golino as Gabriella
- Susan Wokoma as Sr. Protasia
- Callum Scott Howells as Nathan
- Kit Young as Cal
- Sian Reese-Williams as Sian
- Sheyi Cole as Jason
- Tom Vaughan-Lawlor as Kevin
- Robin Nazari as Aldar
- Aoi Okuyama as Mika
- Jesseye Romeo as Ellie
- Cristina Rodlo as Rosita
- Tadashi Watanabe
- Kazuhiro Muroyama

== Production ==
A previous iteration of the script was set up at Fox Searchlight Pictures, with Colin Farrell and Brendan Gleeson attached. Bill Nighy and Micheal Ward were confirmed as the leads in August 2021. Film4 helped develop the film. Producers on the project are Blueprint Pictures' Graham Broadbent and Peter Czernin with Anita Overland. Ben Knight and Diarmuid McKeown serve as executive producers alongside Ollie Madden and Daniel Battsek of Film4.

The production worked closely with the Homeless World Cup Foundation on the film. Frank Cottrell-Boyce met many participants in the Homeless World Cup and developed characters for the film from their stories, which was originally set to film in 2012 and for Cottrell-Boyce was an eleven year project. Principal photography took place in Rome and London in August 2021. The film used extras who had participated in real tournaments and are now no longer homeless which Bill Nighy described to the BBC as "a very sweet bit of symmetry."

== Release ==
The Beautiful Game was released by Netflix on 29 March 2024.

== Reception ==
On the review aggregator website Rotten Tomatoes, The Beautiful Game holds an approval rating of 88% based on 42 reviews with an average rating of 6.6/10. The website's critics consensus reads, "The Beautiful Game has an undeniable warmth that further elevates an already irresistible true story, helping this inspirational drama score despite a reliance on well-worn clichés." On Metacritic, the film holds a weighted average score of 60 out of 100, based on 10 critics, indicating "mixed or average" reviews.

Guy Lodge for Variety describes Ward's "darting, restless screen energy pleasingly complements Nighy's signature laid-back roguishness", but felt that the script has "more subplots and topical issues than it can meaningfully develop." Fionnuala Halligan for Screen Daily said that the discussion of mental health issues "distinguishes it from the rest of the field", and that the film "demonstrates that Micheal Ward is a leading man", but felt that the running time of over two hours was too long.

Brazilian journalist Eric Filardi, from the website Esportelândia, found at least 17 references to real-life football in the work. References ranging from Pelé, Diego Maradona, Lionel Messi, Johan Cruyff and David Beckham to Alex Ferguson, Eric Cantona, Raphinha, Bobby Moore and Geoff Hurst. The Brazilian journalist also found a real-life defeat portrayed in the film: a 5–2 by the English team over Portugal in 1951. In its review, the website praises the film, despite believing that the script could be better explored in a series.

== See also ==
- List of association football films
