= Embassy (upcoming TV series) =

American television series

- Genre: Political thriller
- Created by: Rom Lotan
- Written by: Rom Lotan
- Directed by: John Strickland; Christian Alvart
- Starring: Anna Kendrick; J. K. Simmons; Sam Heughan
- Country of origin: United States
- Original language: English

Production
- Executive producers: Rom Lotan; Hester Ruoff; Bart Ruspoli; Matt Mitchell; Daniel Hetzer; Jakob Neuhausser; Justin Thomson; David Tanner; Ford Lourdes Diaz; Miguel A. Palos Jr.; John Strickland
- Production companies: AGC Television; Ascendant Fox; Turbine Studios

Original release
- Network: MGM+

Embassy is an upcoming television series starring Anna Kendrick and J. K. Simmons. The series will broadcast on MGM+ in the United States.

== Premise ==
The Embassy of the United States, London is attacked by armed mercenaries.

== Cast ==
- Anna Kendrick as Layla
- J. K. Simmons as U.S. Ambassador Elliot Ashford
- Sam Heughan as Connor Wright
- Aleksandar Jovanovic
- James Murray
- Alexander Karim
- Natalie Mendoza
- Katie McGrath
- Lydia Leonard
- Luke Treadaway
- Stephen Odubola
- Hasan Akil

== Production ==
The series is created and written by Rom Lotan with episodes directed by John Strickland with both also executive producers. Christian Alvart is also directing episodes. It is produced by AGC Television with Ascendant Fox and Turbine Studios. Hester Ruoff, Bart Ruspoli and Matt Mitchell, Turbine’s Daniel Hetzer, Jakob Neuhausser, Justin Thomson and David Tanner, and AGC's Ford, Lourdes Diaz and Miguel A. Palos Jr. are also executive producers.

The cast is led by Anna Kendrick and J. K. Simmons. Sam Heughan joined the cast in January 2026. Aleksandar Jovanovic, James Murray, Alexander Karim, Natalie Mendoza, Katie McGrath, Lydia Leonard, Luke Treadaway, Stephen Odubola and Hasan Akil joined the cast in April 2026.

Filming took place in England and Germany with filming locations including London and Cologne.

== Broadcast ==
In April 2026, it was reported that Amazon Prime Video landed the rights in the United Kingdom, Ireland, Canada, France, Australia and New Zealand for the series, which is set to premiere in 2027.

In July 2026, it was reported that the series was also acquired by MGM+ for the United States, Italy, Spain, Italy, Belgium, the Netherlands, Brazil, Mexico, Chile, Colombia, and Argentina release. In Germany, the series is set to premiere on ZDF.
