= Shiro's Story =

British online series (2018)

Shiro's Story is a three-part YouTube series released in 2018, written, directed and narrated through the medium of rap by British rapper Rapman. It stars Joivan Wade as Shiro, Percelle Ascott as his best friend, Kyle, and features appearances from Konan, Deno, Ashley Walters, Headie One, Not3s and Cadet. Themes of betrayal, love and London gang rivalry play throughout, but there is no glamourisation of violence.

The series was shot guerrilla-style on a budget of £3,000 and had been seen 7.2 million times as of early November 2019. The series as a whole has a run time of 45 minutes. Part 2 of the series won GRM Daily's Video of the Year award in 2018.

Rapman subsequently signed a contract with Island Records and Jay-Z's ROC Nation, and in late 2018, Paramount Pictures and BBC Films bought the rights for his feature film Blue Story.

== Episodes ==
Episode	Production Companies	Released	Length	Views (as of 2024)	Notes
1	Aukes Media	Apr 8, 2018	10:15	10.5 Million	Self-financed and created by 'calling in favours'
2	Aukes Media	Jul 1, 2018	13:47	10.2 Million	Won GRM Daily Rated Awards - Video of the Year
3	Island Records, Aukes Media	Sep 16, 2018	21:42	13.6 Million	Received over a million views in five hours. Rapman signed to Jay-Z's ROC Nation soon after.

Behind the scenes episode 1-4

== See also ==
- Blue Story
- The Essence
