= Lenny Rush =

British actor and presenter (born 2009)

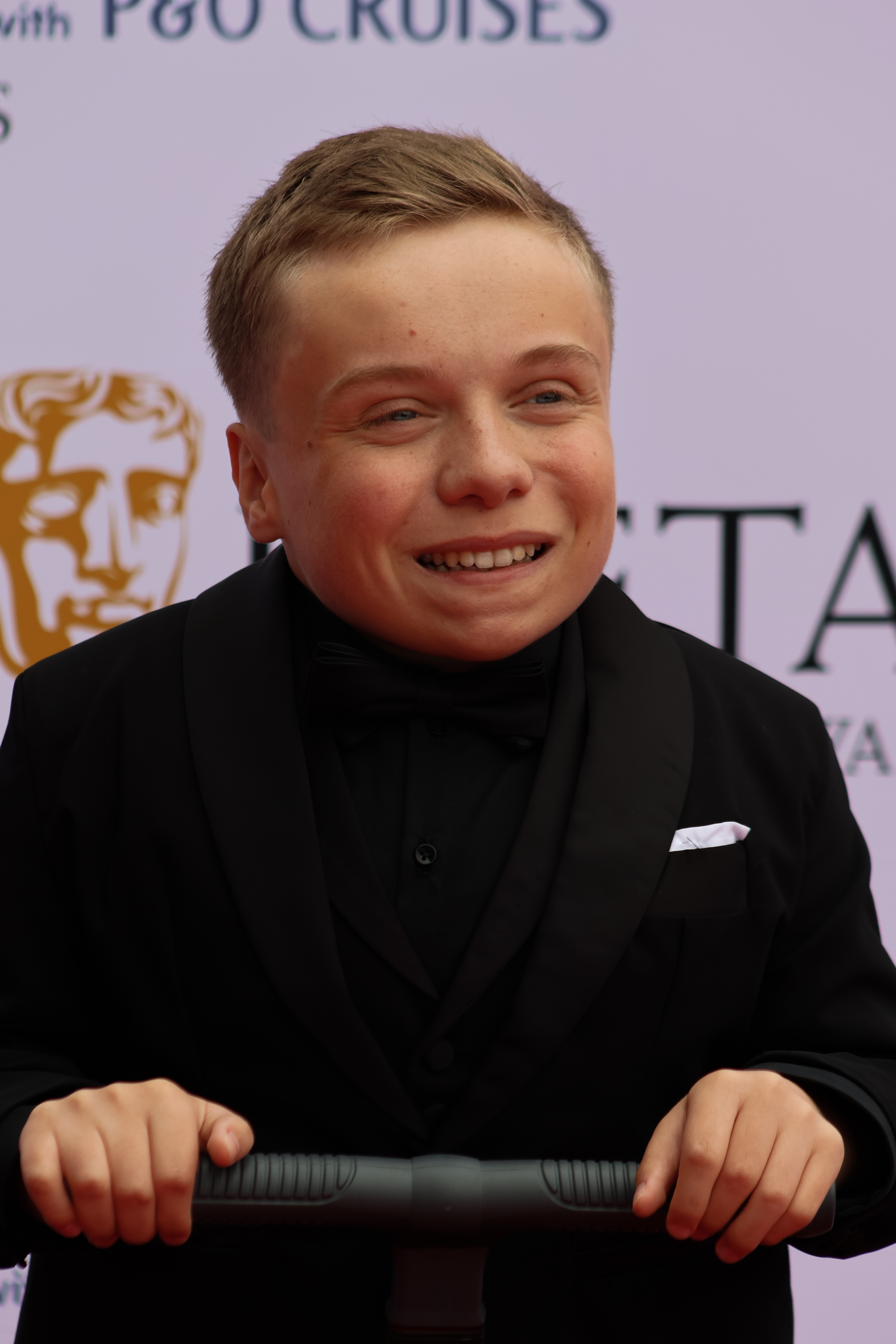
- Rush in 2026
- Born: 17 March 2009 (age 17)
- Occupations: Actor and presenter
- Years active: 2017–present

Lenny Anthony Rush (born 17 March 2009) is a BAFTA award-winning British actor. He is best known for his work on the Daisy May Cooper comedy drama series Am I Being Unreasonable?, for which he won a British Academy Television Award for Best Male Comedy Performance. He also led the television adaptation of Eric Morecambe’s The Reluctant Vampire as Val, and appeared in the sixth season of Slow Horses, as Reece Nesmith, on Apple TV. He received a breakthrough award at the 2023 National Comedy Awards, and won the Breakthrough Award and Best Comedy Performance (Male) at the 2023 Royal Television Society Programme Awards.

== Personal life ==
Lenny Anthony Rush was born on 17 March 2009.

Rush has a medical condition called spondyloepiphyseal dysplasia congenita which affects his growth, resulting in dwarfism.

He is an avid fan of the band Oasis.

== Career ==
Rush first appeared on camera on the CBeebies documentary Our Family. He began acting locally at the Pauline Quirke Academy in Essex. He played roles on CBeebies series Apple Tree House and CBBC's The Dumping Ground and had played Tiny Tim in versions of A Christmas Carol both on stage at The Old Vic in London in 2017 and 2018, and on-screen in a Steven Knight televised retelling of the Charles Dickens classic in 2019.

Rush was given a series regular role in the comedy drama Dodger alongside Christopher Eccleston. Initially a small role called The Sweeper, the part was expanded for Rush and given the character name Morgan. Rush also had the role of Ollie in Daisy May Cooper’s BBC One comedy Am I Being Unreasonable?, in which he improvised lines as well as performing from a script. He received praise for his performance in the show, with Lucy Mangan writing in The Guardian, "What a gift they have in Rush, who has the comic chops and emotional range of an actor twice his age, and the kind of chemistry with Cooper that is an absolute joy to watch."

Rush appeared in the BBC's Children In Need in 2022 and has been a co-host since 2023. He won the Breakthrough Award, and was nominated for the Comedy Performance (Male) Award, for Am I Being Unreasonable? at the Royal Television Society Programme Awards in March 2023.

In June 2023, it was announced that Rush would portray Morris Gibbons, UNIT's scientific advisor, in the fourteenth series of Doctor Who. He was initially cast as the voice of Eric in "Space Babies" before being offered the larger role.

In November 2023, Rush was the winner of Taskmaster New Year's Treat 2024.

In December 2025, Rush had the lead role of Chris in Channel 4 seasonal television film Finding Father Christmas alongside James Buckley and including cameo appearances by Stephen Fry and Hannah Fry. That month, he filmed the Eric Morecambe adaptation The Reluctant Vampire written by Neil and Rob Gibbons.

Rush played Frank Harte alongside Brenda Blethyn and Emmett J. Scanlan in a Channel 4 reboot of the Barbara Taylor Bradford bestselling novel, A Woman of Substance, which aired in March 2026. Rush appeared in series 6 of the spy thriller series Slow Horses, along with Gary Oldman, Christopher Chung and others, released on 16 September on Apple TV. In September 2026, it was announced that Rush would be playing the role of Dobby in the second series of HBO’s Harry Potter.

== Accolades ==
Rush was voted Best Breakthrough at the I Talk Telly Awards in December 2022. It was announced in January 2023 that he would receive a breakthrough award at the National Comedy Awards. On 29 March 2023, he won two awards at the Royal Television Society Programme Awards: the Breakthrough Award, and Best Comedy Performance (Male).

In May 2023, at the age of 14, he won the BAFTA for Male Performance in a Comedy Programme for his work in Am I Being Unreasonable? He was nominated for the same award again in 2026 for the same role.

In March 2026, he was nominated for best actor in a comedy at the British Academy Television Awards.

== Filmography ==
=== Film ===
Key
†	Denotes films that have not yet been released.

Year	Title	Role	Notes
2022	Enola Holmes 2	Newspaper Boy	
2023	Haunting of the Queen Mary	Lukas Calder	
2024	The Night Before Christmas in Wonderland	Robin	Voice role

=== Television ===
Year	Title	Role	Notes
2018–2019	Apple Tree House	Eli	4 episodes
2019	A Christmas Carol	"Tiny" Tim Cratchit	Main role
2020	Old Vic: In Camera - A Christmas Carol	"Tiny" Tim Cratchit	Digital theatre
2021–2022	The Dumping Ground	Murphy	7 episodes
2022–2023	Dodger	Morgan the Crossing Sweeper	10 episodes
2022–present	Am I Being Unreasonable?	Ollie	Main role
2023	Best Interests	George	1 episode
2023	The Kemps: All Gold	Anton	Television special
2024	W1A	Lenny Rush	1 episode
2024	Renegade Nell	Inn Keepers Lad	1 episode
2024	Doctor Who	Morris Gibbons	2 episodes
2025	Finding Father Christmas	Chris	Television film
2026	A Woman of Substance	Frank Harte	7 episodes
2026	Make That Movie	Ewin	1 episode
2026	Slow Horses	Reece Nesmith	5 episodes
2026	The Reluctant Vampire	Val	6 episodes
TBA	Harry Potter †	Dobby	Filming
