= Ada Player =

English actress

- Education: University of Bristol
- Occupations: Actress; Comedian; Filmmaker
- Years active: 2017-present

Ada Player is a British writer, director, comedian and actor, nominated for Best Newcomer at the Edinburgh Comedy Awards in 2025 and for Best Short at the 2025 British Academy Television Awards.

== Early life ==
From Wirksworth, Derbyshire, Player attended Anthony Gell School before studying drama at Belper School. Involved in performance from a young age, Player took part in InepenDANCE, as well as local theatre groups, community theatre, pantomime, and a local group called Big Theatre. Player trained at the French clown school L'Ecole Philippe Gaulier, and was a graduate of Broadway Cinema's 2017 BFI Film Academy Short Course. She also attended the University of Bristol, where she studied Theatre and Performance and met her frequent writing partner Bron Waugh, with both being part of the student sketch society Revunions.

== Career ==
Player won the 2021 Funny Women Comedy Shorts Award for the film Johnny and Tommy which Player created alongside Bron Waugh and Tashi Gool as part of the online mini-series Storytellers.

Appearing at the New Vic Theatre in The Killing of Sister George in 2023, Player was praised by The Daily Telegraph for a "beautifully tragicomic rendering of Alice" compared to a young Jane Horrocks.

Player was nominated at the 2025 British Academy Television Awards for the Channel 4 Comedy Blap pilot short comedy film Peaked (2024), in which she also starred alongside Ele McKenzie and Freddie Meredith, was set in the fictional town of Welworth and filmed in her hometown of Wirksworth.

Player took her show The Origin of Love with her creative partner Bron Waugh to the Edinburgh Fringe Festival in 2025. For the show, they were nominated for Best Newcomer at the Edinburgh Comedy Awards. Part of that show was the origin for her short film Spare Part (2025), which was developed collaboratively with Waugh and produced by Daniel Sved.

On television, Player appeared in comedy series Mr. Bigstuff, with roles in 2026 BBC One comedy series The Reluctant Vampire and Bill's Included. On radio, Player performed in BBC Radio 4's Time Of The Week. Player's film credits include Netflix Christmas comedy heist Jingle Bell Heist and Edgar Wright adaptation of The Running Man.

== Filmography ==
Key
†	Denotes works that have not yet been released

Year	Title	Role	Notes
2020	Coach	The Runner	Short film. Also writer and director
2021	Jonny & Tommy	Femme Fatale	Short film. Also writer and director
2024	Peaked	Beth	Short film. Also writer
2024	Mr Bigstuff	Poppy	
2025	The Power of Parker	Kelly Sue	
2025	Spare Part	Shy Girl	Short film. Also writer and director
2025	The Running Man	Checkout Girl	
2025	Jingle Bell Heist	Lilly	
2026	The Reluctant Vampire	Viv the Invisible Woman	
2026	Bill's Included†	Hettie	
