= Wizards vs Aliens =

British science fantasy television programme

- Genre: Science fiction; Fantasy
- Created by: Russell T Davies; Phil Ford
- Starring: Scott Haran; Percelle Ascott; Annette Badland; Michael Higgs; Dan Starkey; Jefferson Hall; Gwendoline Christie; Brian Blessed; Kristian Philips; Alex Childs
- Composers: Sam Watts; Dan Watts
- Country of origin: United Kingdom
- Original language: English
- No. of series: 3
- No. of episodes: 36

Production
- Executive producers: Russell T Davies (Series 1–2); Bethan Hunt (Series 1–2); Nikki Wilson (Series 3); Phil Ford (Series 3)
- Producers: Brian Minchin (Series 1); Peter Bennett (Series 2–3)
- Editors: Will Oswald; Tim Hodges
- Running time: 28 minutes approx.; 54 minutes approx. (Series 3 premiere)
- Production companies: BBC Cymru Wales; FremantleMedia Enterprises

Original release
- Network: CBBC
- Release: 29 October 2012 – 25 November 2014

Wizards vs Aliens is a British science fantasy television programme produced by BBC Cymru Wales and FremantleMedia Enterprises for CBBC and created by Russell T Davies and Phil Ford. The series focuses on the exploits of 16-year-old wizard Tom Clarke (Scott Haran) and his scientifically gifted best friend Benny Sherwood (Percelle Ascott) in their ongoing battle against the Nekross, a magic-consuming alien race who have arrived on Earth with the intention of hunting down wizards and feasting on their magical energies.

Production-wise, Wizards vs Aliens was created to fill the schedule gap left by the Doctor Who spin-off The Sarah Jane Adventures after its cancellation due to the death of the programme's lead Elisabeth Sladen. The show, however, is set in its own separate continuity; taking place in an alternate universe and unrelated to Doctor Who.

Two series were originally commissioned by the BBC in late 2011. The programme premiered on 29 October 2012 with a first series of 12 episodes (6 two-part serials). Series 2, made up of 14 episodes (7 serials) aired between 28 October to 10 December 2013, while a third and final series of 10 episodes (5 serials) was broadcast between 27 October to 25 November 2014.

Co-creator and former executive producer Russell T Davies stated that the programme could "easily run for ten years", but by January 2015, the series had been placed on an indefinite hiatus due to budget constrictions.

== Premise ==
Wizards vs Aliens is a science fantasy adventure series which sees the collision of two different worlds.

The first series focuses on Tom Clarke, a 16-year-old wizard, and his teenaged best friend Benny Sherwood as they encounter the forces of an alien race called the Nekross who have invaded Earth to consume anything or anyone connected to magic.

The second series continues the conflict between the two sides and sheds more focus on magical creatures and locations and Jathro and Kooth's plan to overthrow the Nekross royals.

In the third series, Tom and Benny part ways when Benny receives an opportunity to work with MIT in America. The Nekross return to Earth's galaxy, with Varg, now king regent of the empire, intending to have vengeance on Tom for turning his sister Lexi into a human (which he did to save her life) and sending her to Earth. He is assisted by his wife Lady Lyzera, who is secretly a sorceress who wishes to take Earth's magic for herself and take over the universe.

== Cast and characters ==
=== Wizards / unenchanted ===
- Scott Haran as Thomas Robert "Tom" Clarke – a football-loving teenage wizard who defends wizardkind and Earth from the alien Nekross. He is Michael and Helen's son and Ursula and Simeon's grandson.
- Percelle Ascott as Benjamin Claude "Benny" Sherwood – Tom's nerdy "unenchanted" best friend whose vast knowledge of science finds its use with Tom's magic against the Nekross. In The Quantum Effect, Benny leaves to study at the Massachusetts Institute of Technology in America but not before bidding farewell to Tom. He comes out as gay at the end of the Series 2 finale.
- Annette Badland as Ursula Crowe – Tom's happy-go-lucky grandmother, Simeon's wife, and Michael's mother-in-law, a wizard descended from the Magical Line of Crowe. She is also Tom's tutor when training him in magic and spells.
- Michael Higgs as Michael Clarke – Tom's widowed father and Ursula's son-in-law, an unenchanted who works as a veterinarian. His main concern is his son's safety and making sure he grows up without having to rely on magic all the time.
- Dan Starkey as Randal Moon – a hobgoblin who lives in the Chamber of Crowe – the source of the magical line of Crowe's magic – and aids the Wizards and their unenchanted allies with his vast knowledge of potions and spells.

=== Nekross ===
- Jefferson Hall (Series 1–2), later Kristian Phillips (Series 3) as Varg – King Regent (formerly Prince) of the Nekross; son of the Nekross King, Lexi's older brother and Lady Lyzera's husband, who fights the Wizards with brute strength. Like his father, he is demanding and determined to find all magic on Earth at all costs.
- Gwendoline Christie as Lexi (Series 1–2) – 17-year-old Princess of the Nekross; daughter of the Nekross King and Varg's younger sister, whose strategic skills and in-depth research into Earth's culture helps her kind in their fights against the Wizards and later develops an on-off relationship with Tom. After Tom turned her into a human (which he did to save her life) and sent her to Earth at the end of Series 2, Lexi is living a peaceful life with her son, Benny Junior.
- Tim Rose and voice of Brian Blessed as The Nekross King (Series 1–2) – King of the Nekross and father to Varg and Lexi. Immobile on the starship Zarantulus due to his obese size, he is in charge of the Royal Family's mission to find and consume all magic on Earth. It was revealed by Chancellor Kooth that the King had consumed Magic for himself and would only send his people scraps, something Varg was surprised to hear. After Series 2, the King is revealed to have retired to Nekron to avoid devourment, leaving Varg to lead the mission to take Earth's magic on his behalf.
- Tom Bell as Technician Jathro 15 – a Nekross of the Zarantulus technician class, who assists Varg and Lexi in their schemes against the Wizards while secretly working for his mother, Chancellor Kooth, as part of their plan to overthrow the Royal Family.
- Alex Childs as Lady Lyzera (Series 3) – Queen Regent of the Nekross and Varg's wife, secretly a Nekross Sorceress who schemes to harvest Earth's magic for herself and use it to conquer the universe.

=== Recurring ===
- Manpreet Bambra as Katie Lord – Tom and Benny's classmate and Tom's love interest, who is unaware of Tom's true nature. She briefly learns of Tom's nature as a wizard, but believing she couldn't handle the stress of worrying about him in his ongoing battle against the Nekross, asks him to perform a spell to wipe her memory.
- Connor Scarlett as Quinn Christopher – Tom and Benny's classmate who used to tease Benny but eventually befriends him. Like Katie, he is unaware of Tom's true nature.
- Victoria Wicks as Chancellor Kooth (Series 2) – a rogue Nekross who temporarily ruled Nekron whilst the Royal Family travelled the universe seeking magic. She is secretly working with her son Jathro to overthrow the Royal Family and become Nekron's permanent ruler.
- Voice of Brian Herring as Stickley (Series 2) – a Hobbledehoy, mischievous magical creature that speaks in rhyme. He resides in the Chamber of Crowe.

== Episodes ==
| Series | Episodes | Originally released | |
| Series | Episodes | First released | Last released |
|---|---|---|---|
| 1 | 12 | 29 October 2012 | 4 December 2012 |
| 2 | 14 | 28 October 2013 | 10 December 2013 |
| 3 | 10 | 27 October 2014 | 25 November 2014 |

=== Series 1 (2012) ===
| No. story | No. in season | Title | Directed by | Written by | Original release date | Prod. code | UK viewers (millions) |
|---|---|---|---|---|---|---|---|
| 1 | 1–2 | "Dawn of the Nekross" | Daniel O'Hara | Phil Ford | 29 October 2012 | 1.1 | 0.595 |
| 1 | 1–2 | "Dawn of the Nekross" | Daniel O'Hara | Phil Ford | 30 October 2012 | 1.2 | 0.502 |
Tom Clarke is secretly a schoolboy wizard. When the magic-eating alien Nekross arrive on Earth, a battle for survival begins. Tom must use his magical powers to protect his family, but only the school geek, Benny, can help him against the plans of the Nekross King.
| 2 | 3–4 | "Grazlax Attacks" | Daniel O'Hara | Phil Ford | 5 November 2012 | 1.3 | 0.508 |
| 2 | 3–4 | "Grazlax Attacks" | Daniel O'Hara | Phil Ford | 6 November 2012 | 1.4 | 0.478 |
Tom's quiet Saturday at Benny's house becomes a fight for their lives when the vicious alien Grazlax hunts them down. The two boys must learn to fight together, combining Tom's magic with Benny's science, or the Nekross's savage pet will devour them.
| 3 | 5–6 | "Rebel Magic" | Griff Rowland | Joseph Lidster | 12 November 2012 | 1.5 | 0.433 |
| 3 | 5–6 | "Rebel Magic" | Griff Rowland | Joseph Lidster | 13 November 2012 | 1.6 | 0.417 |
When Tom meets another wizard called Jackson Hawke, he can't resist dabbling in dangerous magic. Benny tries to warn him, to no avail, but all three lads are unaware of the Nekross getting closer and closer – and this time, alien Prince Varg is determined to make it personal.
| 4 | 7–8 | "Friend or Foe" | Griff Rowland | Clayton Hickman | 19 November 2012 | 1.7 | 0.543 |
| 4 | 7–8 | "Friend or Foe" | Griff Rowland | Clayton Hickman | 20 November 2012 | 1.8 | 0.497 |
Lexi adopts human form and transports to Earth, with one aim, to capture Tom Clarke, but both are unaware that a greater enemy is watching – scheming billionaire Stephanie Gaunt is determined to prove the existence of magic, and nothing can stand in her way.
| 5 | 9–10 | "Fall of the Nekross" | Joss Agnew | Gareth Roberts | 26 November 2012 | 1.9 | 0.409 |
| 5 | 9–10 | "Fall of the Nekross" | Joss Agnew | Gareth Roberts | 27 November 2012 | 1.10 | 0.458 |
Benny launches an attack on the Nekross ship. The schoolboy genius uses all the computers on Earth against the aliens, and the starship Zarantulus is stricken. Soon the plan runs out of control, with terrifying consequences for both wizards and aliens alike.
| 6 | 11–12 | "The Last Day" | Joss Agnew | Phil Ford | 3 December 2012 | 1.11 | 0.496 |
| 6 | 11–12 | "The Last Day" | Joss Agnew | Phil Ford | 4 December 2012 | 1.12 | 0.505 |
While the Nekross advance their Master Plan in secret, Tom is haunted by dreams of his childhood. When he tries to have a normal life by going on a date with Katie, he suddenly sees someone from his past, and discovers the impossible has happened. His entire life will never be the same again.

=== Series 2 (2013) ===
| No. story | No. in season | Title | Directed by | Written by | Original release date | Prod. code | UK viewers (millions) |
|---|---|---|---|---|---|---|---|
| 7 | 1–2 | "100 Wizards" | Beryl Richards | Phil Ford | 28 October 2013 | 2.1 | 0.309 |
| 7 | 1–2 | "100 Wizards" | Beryl Richards | Phil Ford | 29 October 2013 | 2.2 | 0.277 |
Tom and Benny discover a new wizard name Chloe. The race is on to find her before the Nekross can feast, but when Hex TV steps in to broadcast Chloe's powers worldwide, every wizard in the land faces danger.
| 8 | 3–4 | "Vice Versa" | Beryl Richards | Clayton Hickman | 4 November 2013 | 2.3 | 0.397 |
| 8 | 3–4 | "Vice Versa" | Beryl Richards | Clayton Hickman | 5 November 2013 | 2.4 | 0.432 |
The Hobbledehoy gives Benny Tom's magic, and Tom Benny's intelligence.
| 9 | 5–6 | "The Cave of Menla-Gto" | Mark Everest | Joseph Lidster | 11 November 2013 | 2.5 | 0.362 |
| 9 | 5–6 | "The Cave of Menla-Gto" | Mark Everest | Joseph Lidster | 12 November 2013 | 2.6 | 0.362 |
Tom is badly hurt in a magical accident, and the curse of the Devastation threatens his life. His entire family must journey to the wilds of Tibet in search of a cure, within the mystical Cave of Healing. With Benny and Moon left alone, the Nekross launch their most powerful attack yet.
| 10 | 7–8 | "The Curse of Crowe" | Mark Everest | Gareth Roberts | 18 November 2013 | 2.7 | 0.319 |
| 10 | 7–8 | "The Curse of Crowe" | Mark Everest | Gareth Roberts | 19 November 2013 | 2.8 | 0.319 |
Teenage wizard Gemma Raven makes a deal with the Nekross – if they save her mother's life, she will cast a spell strong enough to destroy Tom and Benny's friendship forever. When Ursula is drawn into the evil plan, she discovers that a fate worse than death awaits her, in the shape of the Neverwas.
| 11 | 9–10 | "The Thirteenth Floor" | Paul Murphy | Phil Ford | 25 November 2013 | 2.9 | 0.423 |
| 11 | 9–10 | "The Thirteenth Floor" | Paul Murphy | Phil Ford | 26 November 2013 | 2.10 | 0.380 |
Tom Clarke faces his greatest challenge yet when a mysterious elevator takes him to Floor 13 – a destination leading far beyond this world. While Benny struggles to understand this ancient trap, the Nekross arrive, ready to feast, only to discover that Floor 13 has terrible plans for them too. Note: The story was a rewritten version of one intended for Series 5 of The Sarah Jane Adventures. The series' lead actress Elisabeth Sladen died, which led to the cancellation of the program. The episode, therefore, had never entered production.
| 12 | 11–12 | "Endless Night" | Joss Agnew | Phil Ford | 2 December 2013 | 2.11 | 0.346 |
| 12 | 11–12 | "Endless Night" | Joss Agnew | Phil Ford | 3 December 2013 | 2.12 | 0.341 |
Randall Moon is worried when an eclipse is due to take place. He swears that evil will fall when the Moon blocks out the Sun. He is proved right when the Nekross activate their magnificent master plan – to take control of the Moon's orbit and bring everlasting night to Earth.
| 13 | 13–14 | "All Out War!" | Joss Agnew | Russell T Davies | 9 December 2013 | 2.13 | 0.357 |
| 13 | 13–14 | "All Out War!" | Joss Agnew | Russell T Davies | 10 December 2013 | 2.14 | 0.367 |
On the eve of war, Tom is visited by a wizard family who claim to have found the most powerful object on the planet - the Source of All Magic, but in the skies above, the Nekross are forced to take action, as Kooth sets her evil plan in motion.

=== Series 3 (2014) ===
| No. story | No. in season | Title | Directed by | Written by | Original release date | Prod. code | UK viewers (millions) |
|---|---|---|---|---|---|---|---|
| 14 | 1–2 | "The Secret of Room 12" | Mark Everest | Phil Ford | 27 October 2014 | 3.1 | 0.297 |
| 14 | 1–2 | "The Secret of Room 12" | Mark Everest | Phil Ford | 27 October 2014 | 3.2 | 0.297 |
Tom and Benny think that with the Nekross gone, life is going to get a whole lot easier. When students and teachers at Kings Park School are acting strangely, Tom and Benny fear their enemies have returned and soon suspect alien activity centred on the mysterious Room 12.
| 15 | 3–4 | "The Quantum Effect" | Mark Everest | Julie Dixon | 3 November 2014 | 3.3 | 0.266 |
| 15 | 3–4 | "The Quantum Effect" | Mark Everest | Julie Dixon | 4 November 2014 | 3.4 | 0.229 |
Tom is suspicious when Benny gets an invitation to help an eccentric scientist at the Brook Mill radio telescope. Meanwhile, the Nekross launch a new plan that will leave wizard kind with nowhere to hide.
| 16 | 5–6 | "The Daughters of Stone" | Lee Haven Jones | Phil Ford | 10 November 2014 | 3.5 | 0.288 |
| 16 | 5–6 | "The Daughters of Stone" | Lee Haven Jones | Phil Ford | 11 November 2014 | 3.6 | 0.276 |
Tom is contacted by Katie when something terrifies her grandfather at the spooky disused Blackberry Theatre. He doesn't believe in ghosts but they discover something far worse – a Neverside Witch with wicked plans for the Magical Line of Crowe.
| 17 | 7–8 | "The Key of Bones" | Lee Haven Jones | Sasha Hails | 17 November 2014 | 3.7 | 0.225 |
| 17 | 7–8 | "The Key of Bones" | Lee Haven Jones | Sasha Hails | 18 November 2014 | 3.8 | 0.225 |
There are more tears in the Line of Twilight as Simeon proposes a quest to find the only object that can heal it: the ancient and lost Key of Bones. Unbeknownst to Tom or his grandfather, the Lady Lyzera has invaded Simeon's dreams and is determined to acquire the Key for herself.
| 18 | 9–10 | "Twilight Falls" | Mark Everest | Phil Ford | 24 November 2014 | 3.9 | 0.241 |
| 18 | 9–10 | "Twilight Falls" | Mark Everest | Phil Ford | 25 November 2014 | 3.10 | 0.234 |
Randal Moon learns that the Lady Lyzera intends to release Warlock from his centuries-long exile on the Neverside and he is faced with a decision that may destroy the Chamber of Crowe. Soon, Tom is thrown into a fight to save the Dayside from destruction with an unlikely new partner.

== International broadcasts and releases ==
Wizards vs Aliens made its American debut on the cable channel Hub Network, where it ran from 27 May – 15 June 2013. The series was available on Netflix until December 2018.

In Australia the show airs on ABC 3.

In Poland, the show aired on teleTOON+ between 6 April 2013 – 1 January 2014. In Polish voice-over, the last episode of Series 2 was slightly censored – Benny's dialogue during his coming out was changed from "I'll go on a date, one day. Just not with her. Not with a girl" to "I'll go on a date, one day. Just not with her. Not yet".

In Italy the show aired on Rai Gulp between 2014 and 2015.
