= Finding Father Christmas (2025 film) =

British Christmas film

- Written by: Mark Chappell
- Directed by: Anthony Wilcox
- Starring: Lenny Rush; James Buckley; Greg Davies; Asim Chaudhry; Rochenda Sandall; Ele McKenzie; Stephen Fry; Hannah Fry; Maggie Aderin-Pocock
- Country of origin: United Kingdom
- Original language: English

Production
- Producer: Spencer Millman
- Running time: 90 minutes
- Production companies: Big Talk Studios; South Shore Productions

Original release
- Network: Channel 4
- Release: 24 December 2025

Finding Father Christmas is a British Christmas family television film for Channel 4, starring Lenny Rush with an ensemble cast featuring James Buckley, Greg Davies, Asim Chaudhry, Stephen Fry, Hannah Fry and Maggie Aderin-Pocock. It was broadcast on Channel 4 on 24 December 2025.

== Premise ==
A teenager who refuses to give-up on the idea of Father Christmas goes to great lengths to prove that he is real.

== Cast ==
- Lenny Rush as Chris
- James Buckley as Dad
- Greg Davies as Father Christmas
- Asim Chaudhry as Garden Centre Father Christmas
- Rochenda Sandall as Georgina
- Ele McKenzie as Holly
- Stephen Fry as himself
- Hannah Fry as herself
- Maggie Aderin-Pocock as herself
- Jason Fox as himself
- Marek Larwood as Security Guard

== Production ==
The one-off drama is written by Mark Chappell and produced by Big Talk Studios and co-produced by South Shore Productions. Anthony Wilcox is the director with Spencer Millman as producer. It is executive produced by Kenton Allen, Luke Alkin, and Toby Welch for Big Talk Studios, Mark Chappell, and Andrew Mackenzie for South Shore Productions. Filmed with the working title Dear Father Christmas, in December 2025, the title was confirmed to be Finding Father Christmas.

The ensemble cast is led by Lenny Rush, and also features James Buckley, Asim Chaudhry, Stephen Fry, Hannah Fry and Maggie Aderin-Pocock as well as Jason Fox and Rochenda Sandall, with Greg Davies as the title character.

== Broadcast ==
It premiered on Channel 4 on 24 December 2025.

== Reception ==
Ben Dowell in The Times awarded the film four stars, praising the script and suggesting it as "a Christmas story for the secular age", with Lenny Rush "undeniably dazzling”. Frances Ryan in The Guardian praised the chemistry between Rush and James Buckley, awarding three stars to the film, feeling it lacked a little "emotional punch". Patrick Smith for The Independent said that the "celebrity cameos work well enough" but that Rush "brings infectious optimism…without ever tipping into the mawkish – a high-wire act when your entire character is predicated on teenage belief in Santa Claus" and that Rush "locates the fine line between endearing and insufferable and walks it with the confidence of a seasoned pro."
