= The Reluctant Vampire =

2026 British television series

- Genre: Sitcom
- Based on: The Reluctant Vampire by Eric and Gary Morecambe
- Written by: Neil Gibbons; Rob Gibbons
- Starring: Lenny Rush; Tom Davis; Sian Clifford; Charlie Cooper; Asim Chaudhry; Joe Wilkinson; Kiell Smith-Bynoe
- Country of origin: United Kingdom
- Original language: English
- No. of series: 1
- No. of episodes: 6

Production
- Running time: 30 minutes
- Production company: Boffola Pictures

Original release
- Network: BBC One
- Release: 4 October 2026 – present

The Reluctant Vampire is a six-part British sitcom that is an adaptation of the 1982 children's novel of the same name written by Eric and Gary Morecambe. It stars Lenny Rush in the lead role and is written by Neil and Rob Gibbons. The series premiered on 4 October 2026 on BBC One.

== Premise ==
Described as a coming-of-age sitcom, a young vampire leads a double life.

== Cast and characters ==
- Lenny Rush as Val
- Tom Davis as Victor
- Sian Clifford as Valeeta
- Gabriel Nagy as Vernon
- Asim Chaudhry as Igon
- Joe Wilkinson as Wilf
- Kiell Smith-Bynoe as Kenny the Grocer
- Esther Smith as Susan
- Charlie Cooper as John
- Ellie May Sheridan as Gertie
- Ross Noble as Gary the Gargoyle
- Bill Bailey as Guy the Gargoyle
- Ray Fearon as Reuben
- Fergus Craig as Shane the Muck Raker
- David Hargreaves as Vanya
- Lorna Rose Treen as Trish the Maid
- Ada Player as Viv the Invisible Woman
- Youssef Kerkour as Alexis

== Production ==
The six-part series is adapted by Rob and Neil Gibbons from the 1982 novel of the same name by Eric Morecambe and Gary Morecambe. The series is produced by Boffola Pictures and was commissioned by the BBC in 2023. In May 2025, the series was announced as part of the BBC's upcoming comedy production slate.

The cast is led by Lenny Rush. In October 2025, Rush was joined in the cast by Tom Davis, Sian Clifford, Charlie Cooper, Asim Chaudhry, Joe Wilkinson, Kiell Smith-Bynoe, Esther Smith, Bill Bailey, Ray Fearon, Ellie May Sheridan, Ross Noble and Gabriel Nagy.

Filming commenced on the series in November 2025 and continued into December.Scenes were shot across Gloucestershire, including Woodchester Mansion, a Grade I listed mansion that is the location of the vampire's family home.

== Broadcast ==
The first episode was broadcast on 4 October 2026 on BBC One, with all episodes available that day on BBC iPlayer.

== Reception ==
The Times praised the writing which "infuses Morecambe's original idea with lovely modern touches but honoured the slapstick, the daft wordplay and the physical comedy that was Morecambe's style". Lucy Mangan in The Guardian awarded the series five stars, praising the cast and the performance of Rush. Anita Singh in The Sunday Telegraph gave a less positive review, saying that "the balance of the gags is weighted in favour of older viewers".
