= Abby McDonald =

British author

Abby McDonald is a New York Times bestselling British author and screenwriter, who also writes under the pen name Abigail Haas.

== Early life ==
She was born in England and grew up in Sussex, going on to study Politics, Philosophy & Economics at Oxford University. At college, she became music editor of The Oxford Student and completed her first novel.

== Career ==
She has worked as a music journalist and entertainment critic. Her writing has appeared in the New Musical Express, Plan B magazine, CosmoGIRL! and others.

She has written twelve novels.

As well as writing under Abby McDonald and Abigail Haas, she has written as Melody Grace, self-publishing her Beachwood Bay series. The series became a USA Today and international bestseller series before she revealed she was the author. She is also a staff writer for the Netflix series Bridgerton.

== Published works ==
(sources:) Young Adult novels:

- Sophomore Switch (Candlewick Press - 2009) (published as Life Swap in the UK)
- Boys, Bears & a Serious Pair of Hiking Boots (Candlewick Press - 2010)
- The Anti-Prom (Candlewick Press - 2011)
- Getting Over Garrett Delaney (Candlewick Press - 2012)
- Jane Austen Goes to Hollywood (Candlewick Press - 2013)
- Dangerous Boys (Simon & Schuster UK - 2014) (as Abigail Haas)
- Dangerous Girls (Simon Pulse - 2013) (as Abigail Haas) (republished as 'I'll Never Tell' in 2019)
- And Then He Kissed Me: an anthology (Avon - 2013)

Adult novels:

- The Popularity Rules (Random House - 2009)
- The Liberation of Alice Love (Random House - 2010)

== TV ==
- Bridgerton Season 1 - Staff Writer

104 'An Affair of Honor' (written by)
107 'Oceans Apart' (co-written with Jay Ross)

- Bridgerton Season 2 - Executive Story Editor

205 'An Unthinkable Fate' (written by)

== Movies ==
- Jingle Bell Heist. In December 2023, it was announced that McDonald's original script 'Jingle Bell Heist' had started production in London, starring Olivia Holt and Connor Swindells. The film was produced by ACE Entertainment, and directed by Michael Fimognari. It released on Netflix in November 2025, and debuted at #1 on the global Netflix movie charts that week with 19.3m views, and the #3 streaming movie on all US platforms.

== Personal life ==
In 2009, she lived in Sussex and Montreal. She has lived in London. She currently lives in Los Angeles.
