= Bill's Included =

British comedy television series

- Genre: Sitcom
- Written by: Ben Ashenden; Alexander Owen
- Directed by: Dave Lambert
- Starring: Rob Brydon; Samantha Spiro; Nigel Lindsay; Kevin Eldon; Ada Player
- Country of origin: United Kingdom
- Original language: English
- No. of series: 1
- No. of episodes: 6

Production
- Executive producers: Rupert Majendie; Ben Ashenden; Alexander Owen; Tom Basden; Justine Randle; Steve Coogan
- Producer: Lauriel Martin
- Running time: 27 minutes
- Production company: Baby Cow

Original release
- Network: BBC One
- Release: 20 November 2026 – present

Bill's Included is a British sitcom written by comedy duo The Pin, and starring Rob Brydon as a divorced landlord. It premiered on BBC One on 20 November 2026.

== Cast and characters ==
- Rob Brydon as Bill Beam
- Samantha Spiro as Siobhan
- Nigel Lindsay as Martin
- Kevin Eldon as Drew
- Dylan Brady as Christian
- Ada Player as Hettie
- Harry Baxendale as James
- Yasmin Al-Khudhairi as Zahra
- Alexander Marks as Nathan

== Production ==
The six-part series is produced by Baby Cow and written and executive produced by Ben Ashenden and Alexander Owen, known as comedy duo The Pin. It is directed by Dave Lambert, with Rupert Majendie, Rob Brydon, Tom Basden, Justine Randle and Steve Coogan also executive producers. Lauriel Martin is series producer.

The cast is led by Rob Brydon as a divorced landlord who begins to rent his house to students, with Brydon joining the project in May 2025. In March 2026, Samantha Spiro, Nigel Lindsay and Kevin Eldon joined the cast with students portrayed by Dylan Brady, Ada Player, Yasmin Al-Khudhairi and Harry Baxendale.

Filming took place in March 2026. Filming locations included Amersham.

== Broadcast ==
Bill's Included premiered on BBC One on 20 November 2026, with all episodes also releasing on BBC iPlayer.
