= I Came By =

2022 film by Babak Anvari

- Release poster
- Directed by: Babak Anvari
- Written by: Babak Anvari; Namsi Khan
- Story by: Babak Anvari
- Produced by: Lucan Toh; Babak Anvari
- Starring: George MacKay; Percelle Ascott; Kelly Macdonald; Hugh Bonneville
- Cinematography: Kit Fraser
- Edited by: Matyas Fekete
- Music by: Isobel Waller-Bridge
- Production companies: Film4; Regency Enterprises; XYZ Films; Two & Two Pictures
- Distributed by: Netflix
- Release dates: 19 August 2022 (United Kingdom); 31 August 2022 (Netflix)
- Running time: 110 minutes
- Country: United Kingdom
- Language: English

I Came By is a 2022 British crime thriller film written, co-produced and directed by British-Iranian filmmaker Babak Anvari. The film stars George MacKay, Percelle Ascott, Kelly Macdonald and Hugh Bonneville. The film was released in the United Kingdom on 19 August 2022, before its streaming release on 31 August 2022 by Netflix.

== Plot ==
Toby Nealey is a politically minded, 23-year-old graffiti artist who breaks into the homes of upper-class individuals and leaves tagging the message "I CAME BY" on the walls. His latest target is retired High Court Judge Sir Hector Blake. Despite the judge appearing socially progressive in public, Toby believes him to be a hypocrite. When Toby enters Blake's house, he discovers a pottery studio and an imprisoned man in the basement.

Toby tries to tell his friend and former accomplice, Jay, about what he found. However, Jay is distracted by personal troubles with his pregnant girlfriend, Naz. Toby anonymously calls the police, but they find nothing in Blake's house and leave.

Lizzie, Toby's widowed mother, has grown increasingly worried about her son's lack of direction. When she and Toby get into a shouting match, she throws him out of the house. Toby returns to Blake's residence to free the prisoner, but Blake murders Toby with a cricket bat. He then uses the kiln in his studio to cremate Toby's body, and flushes the ashes down the toilet.

Jay is reluctant to disclose his graffiti activities with Toby, but plants a letter addressed to Blake in Toby's room. The letter spurs the police to visit Blake's home again and they find the basement prison, which he claims is a "panic room". Blake is arrested for obstructing the investigation, but uses his connections to get released quickly.

Lizzie begins following Blake. She witnesses him bring a man to his house: Omid, a gay Iranian asylum seeker. Blake has offered to help him get permanent residency in the UK. Blake recalls how his cruel father took an Indo-Persian man as a lover, and this led to Blake's distraught mother's suicide. The teenage Blake eventually assaulted and nearly killed his father's lover. Despite being drugged, Omid manages to escape. However, he does not go to the police due to his precarious residential status. The next day, Blake tracks down, threatens, imprisons, and murders Omid.

Increasingly desperate, Lizzie asks Jay to help her break into Blake's house. Jay refuses because he has prior charges, and is responsible for his newborn son. Lizzie enters Blake's house alone, only to be caught, murdered, and cremated. When Jay goes looking for Lizzie, he realises she is dead and blames himself.

Jay and Naz's relationship falls apart due to his lack of communication. Sometime later, Naz informs Jay that Blake is going to attend the Birlstone School's tercentenary anniversary celebration.

After Blake leaves the event, Jay follows him to a country estate. Jay fights and subdues Blake. Jay then goes to the pottery studio in the estate's garage and finds a prisoner. Jay calls the police, frees the prisoner, and flees the scene. The police arrive and find Blake bloodied and restrained in the house. On the wall, Jay has left behind graffiti reading "I CAME BY."

== Cast ==
- Hugh Bonneville as Sir Hector Blake
- George MacKay as Toby Nealey
- Percelle Ascott as Jameel "Jay" Agassi
- Kelly Macdonald as Lizzie Nealey
- Varada Sethu as Naserine "Naz" Raheem
- Franc Ashman as DS Ella Lloyd
- Anthony Calf as Superintendent

== Reception ==
The film received mixed reviews from critics. On the review aggregator website Rotten Tomatoes, the film holds an approval rating of 68% based on 44 reviews, with an average rating of 5.7/10. The website's critics consensus reads, "Although it falls a fair bit shy of its Hitchcockian ambitions, I Came By gets a major boost from Hugh Bonneville's excellent against-type performance." Metacritic, which uses a weighted average, assigned the film a score of 57 out of 100 based on 10 reviews, indicating "mixed or average" reviews.

John Nugent for Empire magazine praised Bonneville's performance, but criticised the blunt political messaging, described the cinematography as "flat", and the final product as "messy". Noel Murray similarly praised Bonneville in the Los Angeles Times, and noted that the narrative's shift to different characters kept the film "unpredictable", but also harmed the pacing and tension. Brian Tallerico of RogerEbert.com felt the film was too ambitious, and had "the opposite problem of so many mini-series on the streaming service in that it has a TV season worth of ideas crammed into its runtime." Clarisse Loughrey of The Independent similarly critiqued the lack of focus in the film's messages, stating it was "a well-intentioned work scrambling to find its voice."
