= The Weekend (2016 film) =

2016 film by Sheridan De Myers

- Directed by: Sheridan De Myers
- Screenplay by: Marc Small; Davie Fairbanks
- Story by: Kojo Anim
- Produced by: Sheridan De Myers; Kojo Anim
- Starring: Joivan Wade; Percelle Ascott; Dee Kaate
- Cinematography: Diego Rodriguez
- Edited by: John Holloway
- Music by: Aiden Hogarth
- Production company: Running Films
- Release date: 2 December 2016 (United Kingdom)
- Running time: 94 minutes
- Country: United Kingdom
- Language: English

The Weekend is a 2016 British comedy film directed by Sheridan De Myers. Joivan Wade, Percelle Ascott, and Dee Kaate star as three London youths who find a bag full of money. After they spend tens of thousands of pounds on a shopping spree and massive party, the criminal it was stolen from demands they pay him back. It was released in the United Kingdom on 2 December 2016.

== Plot ==
As Derrick returns to London from college, he bumps into a man who has stolen £100,000 from a crime boss known as the Butcher. Derrick is waiting for a ride home from his friend Malcolm, and the thief is fleeing the Butcher's two thugs, Tiny and Streets; distracted, the two men unknowingly exchange bags. After the thief is struck by a car and killed, Derrick leaves with Malcolm. Before dropping off Derrick, Malcolm says he must take stop to take care of some business. It turns out to be a shady meeting in an alley, frightening Derrick, who believes it to be a drug deal. He is relieved but still frustrated when it turns out to be black market meat.

At his parents' house, Derrick's father first tells him he is proud that his son has attended Oxford, but he threatens to throw out Derrick unless he gets a job over the weekend. Derrick finds employment with a fast food chicken restaurant, annoying his friends, who say he smells like a dead rat. Derrick, Malcolm, and their friend Tyler later leave for a house party, where they hope to meet up with Derrick's friend Martina. However, they are denied entry by the hosts, obnoxious rivals who disliked them in high school. Though the others take it in stride, Derrick becomes flustered and angry, tired of being ridiculed by his peers.

After Derrick cools off, Malcolm and Tyler help him unpack. There, they discover the money amid his other belongings. Confused, Derrick says they should look for the owner or bring it to the police, but Malcolm and Tyler convince him they should spend it. As Derrick's parents have gone to visit family over the weekend, the boys attempt to come up a way to spend all the money in just three days. They first go on a wild shopping spree, buying designer clothes and dining in an upscale restaurant. When Malcolm's car is too small to hold all their purchases, they rent a new car.

Thinking back to how angry he was to be denied entry to the earlier party, Derrick suggests they host their own party – one so extravagant and unforgettable that nobody will ever disrespect them again. The others readily agree, recruiting Malcolm's excitable cousin to quickly spread the word. They rent a large venue, sparing no expense, and are especially pleased when they have the opportunity to deny entry to the rivals who had previously done the same to them. Disgusted by Derrick's behavior, Martina leaves his party, telling him that he has become everything he used to hate.

Tiny and Streets, having discovered the bags were switched, reluctantly pay a homeless man in Derrick's neighborhood to point them toward youths who have been ostentatiously spending money. They crash Derrick's party and introduce him to the Butcher, who gives the boys one day to return his money. Crushed, they realise they have already spent half. They go to a casino, hoping to quickly double their money. Although initially successful, they lose a high-stakes game of blackjack and a followup bet to the winner, who takes their rental car as a prize.

At Derrick's house, Tyler panics and runs, just as Tiny and Streets break in. The thugs briefly chase the boys, catch them, and take them to the Butcher, who plans to harvest and sell their organs on the black market. Before he can kill Derrick, the Butcher's accountant interrupts him. Overhearing the Butcher's financial difficulties, Derrick says he can save the Butcher from paying hefty banking fees. The Butcher lets them go after Derrick comes through, though they realise they must still clean Derrick's parents' house, which was ransacked by the thugs. Before they can, the police arrest them for selling rat meat at the fast food restaurant. After hearing their long story, the police let them go. As Derrick makes up with Martina, a representative from the rental car company hands them a mysterious bag left in the rental car. They are overjoyed to find it is full of money.

== Cast ==
- Joivan Wade as Derrick
- Percelle Ascott as Malcolm
- Dee Kaate as Tyler
- Samson Kayo as Tiny
- Arnold Jorge as Streets
- Nadine Mills as Martina
- Frankie Clarence as the Butcher

== Production ==
Shooting took place in the London Borough of Hackney. Wade and Ascott said they became tired of being offered stereotypical roles and wanted to show London's black community in a more positive light. They formed a YouTube channel with Kaate and later developed their own idea for a comedy film. The trio were contacted by Kojo Anim, a comedian who was working on his own script and wanted them to star in it. Wade said that "everything just aligned", and they agreed. Although set in London, they said the themes, identifying it as a coming-of-age story, are universal and not specific to that city. Ascott said the jump to making a feature film put more responsibility on everyone, but the requirement for teamwork and communication were the same.

== Release ==
The Weekend was released in the UK on 2 December 2016.

== Reception ==
Phil Hoad of The Guardian rated The Weekend 3/5 stars and compared it to On the Buses, calling it "likable, freewheeling, a bit ropey". In also rating it 3/5 stars, Stephen Puddicombe of Total Film wrote that "the jokes frequently land", but the film does not focus enough on character development.
