= Jingle Bell Heist =

2025 romantic comedy film

- Release poster
- Directed by: Michael Fimognari
- Screenplay by: Abby McDonald; Amy Reed
- Story by: Abby McDonald
- Produced by: Matt Kaplan
- Starring: Olivia Holt; Connor Swindells; Lucy Punch; Peter Serafinowicz
- Cinematography: Michael Fimognari
- Edited by: Jeffrey M. Werner
- Music by: Steve Hackman
- Production companies: ACE Entertainment; TeaShop Films; Lionsgate Films
- Distributed by: Netflix
- Release date: November 26, 2025
- Running time: 96 minutes
- Country: United States
- Language: English

Jingle Bell Heist is a 2025 American Christmas romantic comedy film directed by Michael Fimognari, written by Abby McDonald, and starring Olivia Holt, Connor Swindells, Lucy Punch and Peter Serafinowicz.

Just before Christmas, two strangers, Sophia and Nick, team up to rob one of London's most famous department stores both to seek revenge on the owner and overcome financial difficulties.

The film was released on Netflix on November 26, 2025.

== Plot ==
Sophia juggles two jobs — one at upmarket department department store Sterlings, one at a local pub — and commits small thefts to care for her cancer-ridden mother. When stealing a diamond dog collar and some cash at Sterlings, she is secretly recorded by Nick, a contractor who installed the store’s security system. Recently out of prison after being framed by owner Maxwell Sterling for theft, Nick uses the footage to pressure Sophia into helping him rob the store’s secure locker.

When their attempted heist turns up empty, Sophia learns a security guard, Eddie, has been scapegoated and discovers that Sterling keeps £500,000 in a private safe. Desperate to fund her mother’s treatment, she convinces Nick to go after that instead. After Nick fails to hack into the safe's security company servers, they go after a key fob kept by Sterling’s estranged wife, Cynthia, to open the safe. At the holiday party, Nick seemingly seduces her—only for Cynthia to reveal she knows their plan and wants in.

On Christmas Eve, Nick and Sophia break into Sterling’s office. Inside the safe, they find a second biometric lock, which opens when Sophia’s DNA unexpectedly works. She reveals that she is Sterling’s illegitimate daughter, disowned after he fired and abandoned her mother.

Before Nick and Sophia can escape with the money, they are confronted by a security guard, whom Sophia persuades to let them go by exposing Sterling’s long-running insurance scams. Meanwhile, Sterling arrives with police—only to find the items he actually stole planted in his own safe. Cynthia had orchestrated this twist to take over the company, which also avenges Nick and other wronged employees.

Sterling is arrested, Nick and Eddie are cleared, and Cynthia pays Sophia and Nick enough to resolve their financial struggles. Sophia’s mother receives treatment, Nick gets his own place to be closer to his daughter, and Sophia and Nick begin a relationship. The film closes with a warm Christmas dinner shared by their families.

== Cast ==
- Olivia Holt as Sophia
- Connor Swindells as Nick
- Lucy Punch as Cynthia Sterling
- Peter Serafinowicz as Maxwell Sterling
- Poppy Drayton as Brianna
- Natasha Joseph as Rita
- Michael Salami as Ralph
- Belal Sabir as Ali Zafar
- Jess Lloyd-Jones as Lulu
- Mariah Louca as Lori
- Ellie Nunn as Bethany
- James Dryden as Leo Stein
- Alana-Star Khan as Maddie
- Chyna-Rose Frederick as Matilda
- Nicola Alexis as Diane
- Ed Kear as Eddie Morris
- Ada Player as Lilly
- Homer Todiwala as Detective Jones
- Brooke Henzell as Samantha Warren
- Des Fleming as Dr. Wilson
- Ray Keith as Kabir

== Production ==
=== Development ===
In December 2022, Abby McDonald's screenplay Jingle Bell Heist was revealed to be included on that year's "Black List" of most-liked unproduced screenplays. The film is produced by Matt Kaplan for ACE Entertainment, and directed by Michael Fimognari.

=== Filming ===
Production got underway in December 2023 with principal photography taking place in London.

== Release ==
In August 2025, it was announced that Netflix would be releasing the film on November 26, 2025.

== Reception ==
On the review aggregator website Rotten Tomatoes, 76% of 25 critics' reviews are positive, with an average rating of 5.5/10. Metacritic, which uses a weighted average, assigned the film a score of 58 out of 100, based on 5 critics, indicating "mixed or average" reviews.
