= The Hard Stop =

2015 British documentary film

- Directed by: George Amponsah
- Written by: George Amponsah; Dionne Walker
- Produced by: George Amponsah; Dionne Walker
- Cinematography: Colin Elves; Matthias Pilz
- Edited by: Michael Aaglund; James Delvin
- Music by: Roger Goula Sarda
- Production company: Ga Films
- Distributed by: Metrodome Distribution
- Release dates: 14 September 2015 (Toronto); 15 July 2016 (UK)
- Running time: 85 minutes
- Language: English

The Hard Stop is a 2015 British documentary film, written and produced by George Amponsah and Dionne Walker, about the aftermath of the death of Mark Duggan, a young black man who lost his life at the hands of the Metropolitan Police in Tottenham, north London, in 2011 during a "hard stop" when officers "pulled out in front of Duggan's speeding cab, ready for confrontation" with the armed Duggan. A peaceful protest about the event escalated into several days of rioting that spread across London and beyond, and for a time made news headlines around the world.

== Background ==
The film begins with Martin Luther King Jr.'s quote: "A riot is the language of the unheard", which Catherine Bray of Variety says "intelligently informs and underpins the entire pic" as it "grapples sincerely with the cultural context of a wave of riots that broke out across England in the summer of 2011, in the wake of the fatal police shooting of London resident Mark Duggan." Picking up the story in the period after media coverage of it waned, Amponsah's film sheds light on the environment from which Mark Duggan came. Focusing on two of his childhood friends, Marcus Knox-Hooke and Kurtis Henville, against the backdrop of their home on Broadwater Farm — an estate that notoriously was the scene of a 1985 riot triggered by tensions between the police and local black people — the film follows the journey of the two young black men over 24 months, until the 2012 verdict that found Duggan to have been "lawfully killed".

Marcus Knox-Hooke was accused of being the instigator of the 2011 riots and, though that charge was dropped, he was sentenced to 32 months' imprisonment following a prosecution for other offences. Producer Dionne Walker has said: "We started with Marcus but then he went to prison. There was a whole inquest… [then] you see in the film where it was a clear decision to follow Kurtis and his home life, which helped set the context of the film. It’s a microcosm, but there were wider issues going on.… It’s not an investigative Panorama-esque TV format documentary. It’s an independent, observational, cinematic film." In the words of Amponsah, "Our objective is to tell a story and engage an audience. When Marcus is in the cab on his way to being sentenced and starts crying because of the frustration of his friend and what’s about to happen to him, I don’t put down the camera.... The story that you see on the screen, we’re talking about over 130 hours of footage. It all came down to the editing.… The emotional investment is in the edit."

== Reception ==
The Hard Stop had its world premiere on 14 September 2015 at the Toronto International Film Festival, in addition to being screened on 17 October 2015 at the London Film Festival, prior to general release in the UK on 15 July 2016.

The film has been generally well received, being given four-star reviews by Peter Bradshaw of The Guardian, Charlotte O'Sullivan of the Evening Standard and Emma Simmonds of The List, among others. Sight & Sound described The Hard Stop as "Powerful and timely", and The Voice newspaper called it "an intimate documentary ... a profoundly humane, thought-provoking and topical testament, which gives a voice to people who are rarely heard." Alice Charles in The Huffington Post noted that there was "something undeniably poignant" about the film, while acknowledging that it "raises more questions than it answers." According to Time Out, "What the film ends up being about is opportunity: the opportunities we’re born with or without, and the opportunity to defy destiny by making the right choices. It’s not a happy watch – but it’s an essential one if you want better to understand the city and people around you." Grace Hetherington in her review in The Metropolist gives The Hard Stop a five-star rating and observes:

"Amponsah wants the audience to connect with Marcus and Kurtis not just as subsidiaries of Mark Duggan’s character but as representatives of their own culture and the place they call home.... This film cleverly highlights that the riots did not initially start from hatred, but from a heart of frustration and from a seed of disdain between residents of Broadwater Farm estate and the police.... The film finishes with some hard-hitting truths. In Britain, since 1990 there have been over 1500 deaths in custody or following police contact. No officer has ever been convicted following an unlawful killing verdict. This film does not end on resolution, because it cannot. It highlights the repetitive society these residents are living in, transposing to deaths similar over in the US as of recent. It is a cycle of power, resentment and ultimately violence. And it is not just the people thrown into prison that have to realise their own demons in order for it to stop... [The Hard Stop] calls for those in authority to reflect on their wants and actions too, before it happens again."

In 2017 the film was nominated for a BAFTA in the category Best debut by a British writer, director or producer, and for two British Independent Film Awards: Best Documentary and Breakthrough Producer.
