= Percelle Ascott =

Zimbabwean-British actor and writer (b. 1993)

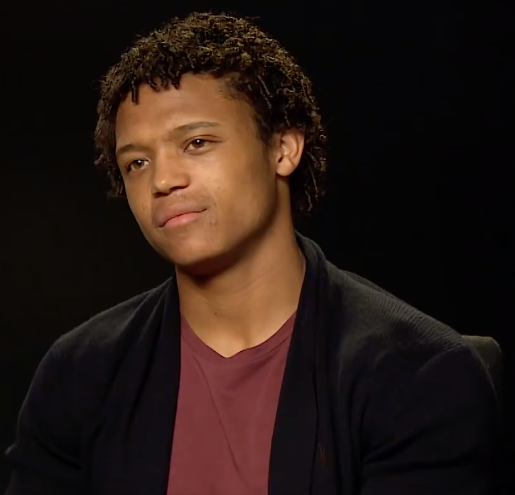
- Ascott in 2018
- Born: 10 June 1993 (age 33); Bulawayo, Zimbabwe
- Occupations: Actor, writer
- Years active: 2010–present

Percelle Ascott (born 10 June 1993) is a Zimbabwean actor and writer. He is known for his roles in the CBBC series Wizards vs Aliens (2012–2014) and the Netflix series The Innocents (2018). As a trio, Ascott collaborated with Joivan Wade and Dee Kaate on the web comedy Mandem on the Wall (2011–2013), the E4 series Youngers (2013–2014), and the film The Weekend (2016).

== Early life and education ==
Ascott was born in Bulawayo, Zimbabwe and moved to England with his family when he was three where he grew up in Penge, South London. He first discovered acting at the age of 11 through a school production of The Jungle Book. Ascott's drama teacher at Woodcote High School helped him get into the BRIT School when he was 16. It was here Ascott met his Mandem on the Wall collaborator Joivan Wade.

== Career ==
Ascott made his television debut as Wayne in the 2010 BBC Two television film Excluded and appeared as a guest lead in two episodes of Silent Witness.

In 2010, Ascott and Wade were approached by Glen Murphy of Twist and Pulse to perform a comedy sketch at one of the duo's live shows. Here they met another act Dee Kaate, with whom they created the web series Mandem on the Wall. The trio were then cast in the E4 series Youngers with their Mandem on the Wall characters incorporated into the story. Mandem on the Wall culminated in a live performance at the Hackney Empire in 2015.

From 2012 to 2014, Ascott starred in Russell T Davies and Phil Ford's CBBC science fiction series Wizards vs Aliens as Benny Sherwood, best friend of the main character Tom, who defends wizardkind and Earth against the Nekross. He made his feature film debut as Mike in the 2013 musical Beat Girl. He then had a supporting role as Ben in the drama film X+Y. He reunited with Wade and Kaate for The Weekend and the interactive online sci-fi Genesis.

Ascott starred in the 2018 Netflix supernatural series The Innocents alongside Sorcha Groundsell and Guy Pearce. That same year, he appeared in the Doctor Who episode "The Battle of Ranskoor Av Kolos" and Rapman's web trilogy Shiro's Story with Wade. Ascott played Cleveland in Julian Kostov's The Dare and Jesse in series 3 of the Sky Atlantic police procedural Tin Star.

Ascott has upcoming film roles in I Came By, Inner Bull, and Kukeri.

== Personal life ==
In 2024, Ascott welcomed his daughter, Zuri.

== Filmography ==
=== Film ===
Year	Title	Role	Notes
2010	Electric	Percy	Short film
2012	Callum	Jerome	Short film
2012	Sunroof	Adam	Short film
2013	Beat Girl	Mike	
2014	X+Y	Ben	
2016	The Weekend	Malcolm	
2016	Deep It	Kadz	Short film
2019	The Dare	Cleveland	
2019	Dawn in the Dark	Uncle Nate	Short film
2020	My Favourite Place	Alex	Short film
2022	Colby	Lace	Short film
2022	I Came By	Jameel "Jay" Agassi	Netflix film

=== Television ===
Year	Title	Role	Notes
2010	Excluded	Wayne	TV movie
2012	Silent Witness	Joel Baron	2 episodes
2012–2014	Wizards vs Aliens	Banjamín "Benny" Sherwood	Main cast
2013–2014	Youngers	Yungah Baby	Main cast
2015	The Dog Ate My Homework	Panelist	1 episode
2016	The Coroner	Jake Taylor	Episode: "Those in Peril"
2017	Casualty	Kalen Gardner	Episode: "When the Whistle Blows"
2018	The Innocents	Harry	Main cast
2018	Doctor Who	Delph	Episode: "The Battle of Ranskoor Av Kolos"
2020	Tin Star	Jesse	3 episodes
2024	Domino Day	Leon	Recurring role
2025	I, Jack Wright	Reuben	6 episodes

=== Web ===
Year	Title	Role	Notes
2011–2013	Mandem on the Wall	Yungah Baby	Co-writer
2016	Genesis		Interactive
2018	Shiro's Story	Kyle	Part 1-3 (Short YouTube Series)

== Stage ==
Year	Title	Role	Notes
2015	Mandem on the Wall Live	Yungah Baby	Hackney Empire, London
