= Scott Haran =

English actor

- Born: 11 April 1992 (age 34); London, England
- Occupation: Actor
- Years active: 1992–present
- Known for: Wizards vs Aliens & The Bystanders

Scott Haran (born 11 April 1992) is an English actor, best known for the CBBC series Wizards vs Aliens. He also appeared in the TV shows The Bill and Upstairs Downstairs. His recent work includes multiple award winning British Sci-Fi Comedy: The Bystanders (2022) by Director Gabriel Foster Prior.

== Filmography ==
| Year | Title | Role | Notes |
|---|---|---|---|
| 2010 | The Bill | Paul Hayes | Episode: Held Responsible |
| 2011 | Follow | Ryan | Short |
| 2012 | Upstairs Downstairs | Teddy Skinner | Episode: All the Things You Are |
| 2012–14 | Wizards vs Aliens | Thomas "Tom" Clarke | 36 episodes (main character) |
| 2017 | Snatch | Disciple | Episode: The Smelt Down |
| 2022 | The Bystanders | Pete Weir | Feature Film (lead) |
