= Joivan Wade =

British actor

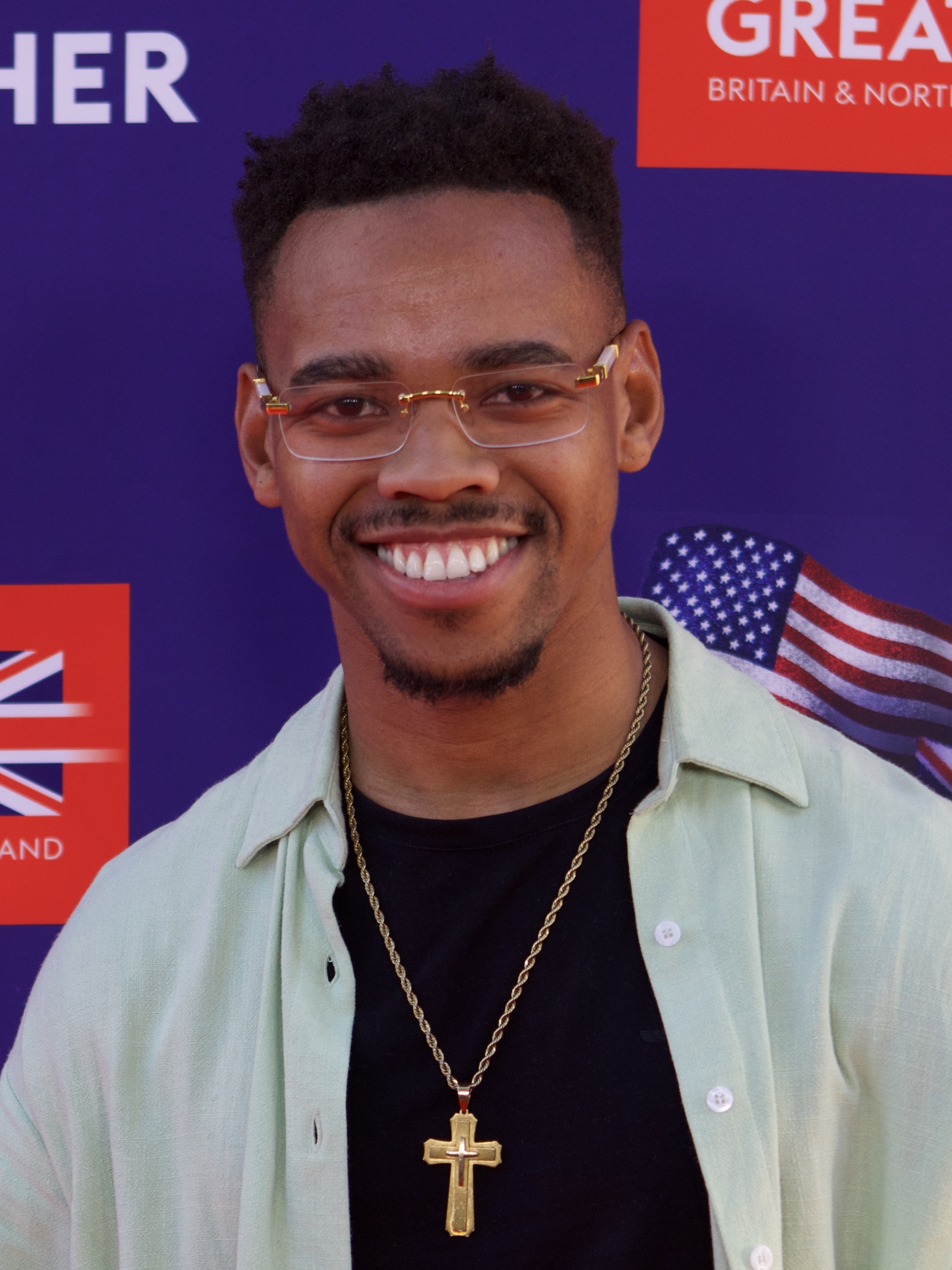
- Wade in 2026
- Born: 23 July 1993 (age 33); Bromley, South London, England
- Occupations: Actor, writer, director, producer
- Years active: 2011–present

Joivan Wade (/dʒəˈvæn/ juh-VAN; born 23 July 1993) is an English actor known for playing Manyou in the BBC comedy television series Big School, Jordan Johnson on the BBC soap opera EastEnders, and Victor Stone / Cyborg in the Max series Doom Patrol and Titans.

== Early life ==
Wade was born 23 July 1993 to Derek and Andrea Wade. His father was a social worker and a member of the 1980s gospel music group The Wades, who founded The Polishing Project, a scheme to help disadvantaged youth identify and achieve their goals. His mother is an ordained minister and corporate life coach. Joivan has three brothers. Derek Wade died in 2014, and his mother remarried. Wade read comic books heavily while younger.

A high-energy child, Wade enrolled at the age of 13 at the D&B Academy of Performing Arts in his home town of Bromley. He also played football, (Note: Two of his brothers played for Charlton Athletic F.C. Under-23s and Academy, and his cousin, Jordan Ayew, plays for Crystal Palace F.C.) and he was good enough to try out for both Charlton Athletic F.C. Under-23s and Academy and Crystal Palace F.C. Under-23s and Academy. Wade credits his parents for supporting him in both endeavors, and instilling in him the confidence to achieve whatever he wished to pursue. He decided when he was 15 years that he loved acting more than football. Friends told him to enroll at the BRIT School. He decided to apply only three days before the deadline. His father drove him to the school so that he could turn in his application the day it was due.

The BRIT School taught primarily dramatic acting, and Wade performed in a number of plays by William Shakespeare. Wade's biggest inspiration is Will Smith, an actor who also directs, produces, and writes. He has tried to model his career on Smith's by creating content, performing in it, and forming his own production company. Wade also cites Michael Fassbender, Daniel Day-Lewis, Tom Hardy, Kevin Hart, and Dwayne Johnson as role models in terms of acting and career path. While at the BRIT School, Wade met Percelle Ascott, and the two became close friends.

Wade graduated from the BRIT School and then successfully auditioned for the National Youth Theatre.

== Career ==
=== Mandem on the Wall ===
Deciding to accelerate his career, Wade decided to initially pursue comedy, as a comedy was the most likely to go viral on social media.

In 2010, Glen Murphy of Twist and Pulse asked Wade and Ascott to perform a comedy sketch at one of the dance-and-comedy duo's live shows. They wrote their sketch the night before the show, and were a hit with the audience. Dee Kaate, who had performed a stand-up comedy act in the show, met with them afterward. The three immediately began discussing ways to create their own content to boost their careers.

Eight days after the Twist and Pulse live show, the trio filmed their first episode of Mandem on the Wall, a web series about three young South London men sitting on a wall, flirting with passing girls, and "talking bullshit". Mandem premiered on 24 December 2011. Within a month, the episode had 1.1 million views on YouTube and the trio was famous among teens and young adults in Britain. Wade's father helped manage the Mandem project, which eventually had a live presentation at the Hackney Empire theatre in 2015.

=== British television success and film debut ===
The three worked on Mandem on the Wall in order to get on television. Based on the success of Mandem, Wade was cast in the first series of the BBC comedy Big School, which aired in 2013. Big Talk Productions became interested in the trio based on their success with Mandem as well, and cast Wade, Ascott, and Kaate in the teen drama Youngers on E4. Youngers lasted for two series. Big Talk Productions encouraged Wade, Ascott, and Kaate to pitch their own show. That pitch never happened: There were delays in securing the green-light for a second series of Youngers, and the trio did not want to leave the show in the lurch. In 2014 and 2015, Wade appeared in two episodes of Doctor Who as Rigsy, a young graffiti artist who helps save the world.

Wade joined the cast of BBC soap opera EastEnders in February 2016 as Jordan Johnson, taking over the role from Michael-Joel David Stuart. Filming four episodes a week for four months proved time-consuming, and Wade says his businesses suffered from it. Wade, Ascott, and Kaate filmed The JPD Show for BBC Three in mid-2016, but the pilot was not picked up. The trio also starred in the 2016 film The Weekend, a comedy about three youths who find a gangster's sack of money and spend it all before the mobster demands it back. The Weekend marked Wade's British feature film debut.

=== Wall of Comedy and Shiro's Story ===
Wade says that his acting career took so much time away from Mandem on the Wall that the trio lost their audience and the web series died. The three wrote, directed, and acted in their own and joint projects, but had no media platform for them. Reviving Mandem as a platform did not seem appropriate, so Wade, Ascott, and Kaate created the Facebook page Wall of Comedy in 2015 as their new platform. (Note: To "write on your wall" is slang to make a comment on someone's Facebook page. The trio chose the name "Wall of Comedy" as a riff on this slang phrase.) Wall of Comedy swiftly began to feature the work of other comedians, and subsequently developed channels on Instagram, Twitter, YouTube, and other social media as well. Wall of Comedy began with posts receiving about 300,000 "likes" on YouTube. Within six months, posts were receiving 1.5 million "likes" or more. By July 2019, Wall of Comedy had more than 3.5 billion views across all media platforms. The trio then co-founded Wall of Music to promote their own and others' musical endeavors, and Wall of Talent to promote up-and-coming actors and performers.

Wade and Ascott produced and co-starred in the short film Shiro's Story in 2018. Written and directed by Rapman (real name: Andrew Onwubolu), the story is about a South London boy who becomes involved with drug dealing and gang violence. His life is complicated when the girl he believed to be his was actually fathered by one of his friends. The story is told largely through rap music lyrics Lip synched by the cast. The film aired in three parts on YouTube. The last episode received 1 million views in its first five hours online.

=== American success ===
The same year he made Shiro's Story, Wade made his American feature film debut in The First Purge, portraying a vengeful drug dealer named Isaiah.

Producer Greg Berlanti saw Wade in The First Purge, and three days after the film's premiere invited him to audition for Berlanti's forthcoming DC Universe series Doom Patrol. Wade did an audition tape, and sent it in. Hearing that it was going to be 13 one-hour episodes, he lost interest because he didn't want to be taken away from his production company for any length of time. A month later, Berlanti's casting office in the United Kingdom asked him why he hadn't followed up. Only then did Wade learn the role was for Victor Stone / Cyborg. Wade still hesitated, and two hours later Wade's agent in Los Angeles called to say Berlanti had just sent him an email asking Joivan to take the role. His Los Angeles agent sent up a Skype call to explain the series further. Four days later, Wade flew to Los Angeles for an in-person audition. Two days later, Berlanti gave him the role.

== Other projects and accolades ==
Wade, Ascott, and Kaate jointly own JPD3 Entertainment, a production company.

With one of his brothers, Wade formed a charitable foundation, Wade's World. According to Wade, "It tackles things like how to pursue a nine-to-five while living out your dream, how to let go of what the naysayers are saying and forget the hate." The foundation produces videos for its own YouTube channel.

In 2019, Variety named Wade as one of the "10 Brits to Watch".

== Personal life ==
Joivan Wade is a Christian.

On the 26th August 2026 wade married American actress Melissa L. Williams.

== Filmography ==
=== Film ===
Year	Title	Role	Notes
2012	Callum	Ellis	Short film
2015	Chick or Treat	Jay	Short film
2016	Rwd/Fwd	Jay	Short film
2016	Deep It	Miles	Short film
2016	The Weekend	Derrick	
2017	The Riot Act	Jerome	Short film
2018	The First Purge	Isaiah	
2019	AMANI	Amani	Short film

=== Television ===
Year	Title	Role	Notes
2012	Casualty	Jacob	Episode: "#HolbyRiot - Part 2"
2013	Big School	Manyou	Main cast
2013–2014	Youngers	Failia	16 episodes
2014, 2015	Doctor Who	Rigsy	2 episodes
2015	Pompidou	Teenager	Episode: "Hoarder"
2015	The Interceptor	Benji	1 episode
2015	Walliams & Friend	Various characters	Episode: "Joanna Lumley"
2016	EastEnders	Jordan Johnson	
2016	Comedy Feeds	Various characters	Episode: "JPD"
2017	The Break	Raheem	Episode: "Special Delivery"
2019–2023	Doom Patrol	Victor Stone / Cyborg	Main role
2020	Legends of Tomorrow	Victor Stone / Cyborg	Episode: "Crisis on Infinite Earths, Part 5" (archive footage)
2023	Bel-Air	Fredrick Thompson	
2023	Titans	Victor Stone / Cyborg	2 episodes

=== Web ===
Year	Title	Role	Notes
2018	Shiro's Story	Shiro	Part 1-3 (Short YouTube Series)

== Awards and nominations ==
Year	Awards	Category	Nominated work	Result
2016	Screen Nation Film and Television Awards	Rising Star	Himself	Nominated
