= Michael Salami =

Actor

- Education: Stella Adler Studio of Acting
- Occupation: Actor

Michael Salami is an actor known for his roles as Mark in the BBC Three comedy series Just a Couple, Shane Sweeney in the Channel 4 soap opera Hollyoaks, Gabriel in the Netflix series Supacell, and Femi's uncle in the BBC series Boarders. In 2023, he won Best Actor at the British Short Film Awards for his performance in the short film Saving Art.

== Career ==
Salami trained at the Stella Adler Studio of Acting, where he was a member of the class of 2016.

In 2017, Salami starred opposite Frieda Thiel as Mark in Just a Couple, a six-part BBC Three comedy written and directed by Sebastian Thiel. The programme developed from a short-form project first released online, for which Salami had received a Screen Nation Award. He subsequently played Shane Sweeney in Hollyoaks.

In 2019, Salami played Sterling in a touring production of August Wilson's Two Trains Running, directed by Nancy Medina and co-presented by English Touring Theatre. Reviewing the production for The Guardian, Michael Billington included Salami among the cast members whose performances he highlighted.

In 2020, Salami portrayed astronaut Fred Haise in the online theatre production Apollo 13: The Dark Side of the Moon, written by Torben Betts and directed by Alastair Whatley and Charlotte Peters. The production was also reviewed by The Guardian. He also appeared as Max Halliday in a touring production of Dial M for Murder, which resumed touring in 2021 following disruption to its original run.

Salami was among the principal cast of the 2023 short film Saving Art, directed by Remi R. M. Moses. He won Best Actor for the film at the 2023 British Short Film Awards.

In 2024, Salami appeared as Gabriel, the friend of protagonist Michael Lasaki, in Rapman's Netflix science-fiction series Supacell. He was also among the guest cast of the 2024 Christmas special of the BBC crime drama Death in Paradise.

In 2025, he joined the second series of Boarders as Femi's uncle. The same year, he played Dan in Flora Wilson Brown's play The Beautiful Future Is Coming at the Bristol Old Vic. Reviewing the production for The Guardian, Gareth Llŷr Evans highlighted Salami's performance in the role. Salami also appeared as Ralph in the Netflix romantic comedy film Jingle Bell Heist.

== Selected credits ==
=== Screen ===
Year	Title	Role	Notes	Ref.
2017	Just a Couple	Mark	BBC Three series	
2017–2018	Hollyoaks	Shane Sweeney	Television series	
2024	Supacell	Gabriel	Netflix series	
2025	Boarders	Femi's uncle	Series 2	
2025	Jingle Bell Heist	Ralph	Film	

=== Theatre ===
Year	Production	Role	Notes	Ref.
2019	Two Trains Running	Sterling	Touring production	
2020	Apollo 13: The Dark Side of the Moon	Fred Haise	Online production	
2020–2021	Dial M for Murder	Max Halliday	UK tour	
2025	The Beautiful Future Is Coming	Dan	Bristol Old Vic	

== Awards and nominations ==
Year	Award	Category	Work	Result	Ref.
2023	British Short Film Awards	Best Actor	Saving Art	Won	
