= George Amponsah =

British director of documentary films

- Born: George Bernard Amponsah; Roehampton, London, England
- Occupation: Film director
- Notable work: The Hard Stop (2015); Gassed Up
- Website: www.gafilms.co.uk

George Bernard Amponsah is a British film director who is most notable for his documentaries. His 2015 feature-length documentary film The Hard Stop, about the death of Mark Duggan, won a 2017 BAFTA nomination for the Award for Outstanding Debut by a British Writer, Director or Producer. In 2023, Amponsah completed direction of his first drama feature, Gassed Up – described by The Guardian as "A Scorsese-like thrill ride" – which had a UK nationwide cinema release in February 2024, and subsequently played on the Amazon Prime streaming platform.

== Biography ==
Born and raised in London, England, Amponsah is of Ghanaian parentage. He started taking photographs and working with Super 8mm film in the 1980s. In 1989, he attended the University of East London, and a post-graduate film won him a scholarship to take the directing course at the National Film and Television School (NFTS). Since graduating in 2000 from the NFTS, he has taught documentary filmmaking there and at the Met Film School. He continued to work as a tutor with young people, while making short films for the web and developing new feature films.

His 2004 BBC documentary The Importance of Being Elegant was about Congolese singer Papa Wemba. The Fighting Spirit (2007) followed three young boxers in Ghana.

His 2015 feature-length documentary The Hard Stop, about the death of Mark Duggan, was nominated in 2017 for a BAFTA in the category "Outstanding Debut by a British Writer, Director or Producer", and for two British Independent Film Awards: Best Documentary and Breakthrough Producer.

Amponsah's debut drama feature film, Gassed Up was announced for launch on Amazon Prime Video in 2023. Gassed Up – which tells the story of a London youth who gets mixed up with a rampaging gang of moped thieves – was described in The Guardian as "A Scorsese-like thrill ride", having a UK nationwide cinema release in February 2024 and subsequently playing on Amazon Prime.

== Documentaries ==
- First steps, 1998.
- The Importance of Being Elegant, 2004.
- The Fighting Spirit, 2007.
- Bruised to Be Used, 2008.
- One Plus One, 2008.
- Diaspora Calling, 2011.
- The Hard Stop, 2015.
- Dope, 2018.
- Black Power: A British Story of Resistance, 2021.
- Gassed Up, 2024
