= Blue Story =

2019 film directed by Rapman

- Theatrical release poster
- Directed by: Rapman
- Screenplay by: Rapman
- Based on: Blue Story by Rapman
- Produced by: Joy Gharoro-Akpojotor; Damian Jones
- Starring: Stephen Odubola; Micheal Ward; Eric Kofi-Abrefa; Khali Best; Karla-Simone Spence; Richie Campbell; Jo Martin; Junior Afolabi Salokun
- Cinematography: Simon Stolland
- Edited by: Mdhamiri Á Nkemi
- Music by: Jonathon Deering
- Production companies: BBC Films; DJ Films; Joi Productions
- Distributed by: Paramount Pictures
- Release date: 22 November 2019 (United Kingdom)
- Running time: 91 minutes
- Country: United Kingdom
- Language: English
- Budget: £1.3 million
- Box office: £4.7 million

Blue Story is a 2019 British musical crime drama film written, directed, and narrated by Rapman (Andrew Onwubolu) through the medium of rap and starring Stephen Odubola and Micheal Ward, with Eric Kofi-Abrefa, Khali Best, Karla-Simone Spence, Richie Campbell, Jo Martin and Junior Afolabi Salokun in supporting roles. Serving as Rapman's feature directorial debut, the film is based on his 2014 YouTube series of the same name, which in turn is based on the real life gangs - the Peckham Boys and Ghetto Boys. The story follows best friends Marco (Ward) and Timmy (Odubola) who, from different areas of London (Peckham and Deptford), find themselves becoming enemies in a violent and insidious postcode war.

Following the success of his three-part YouTube series Shiro's Story and signing with Jay-Z to Roc Nation, Rapman and BBC Films developed and co-financed the film, and in late 2018 Paramount Pictures bought worldwide distribution rights for the film. Principal photography began in February 2019 and lasted for 23 days. The film focuses on themes such as gang violence, friendship, betrayal, love, youth, and black masculinity.

Blue Story was released in the United Kingdom on 22 November 2019 and was later released in the United States on 5 May 2020, after its original 20 March release date was cancelled due to the COVID-19 pandemic. The film received positive reviews from critics and grossed £4.7 million on a budget of £1.4 million, making it the highest grossing British urban film of all time.

At the 73rd British Academy Film Awards, the film earned one nomination, winning the BAFTA Rising Star for Ward and was short-listed alongside nine other films by the British Academy of Film and Television Arts for the category of the BAFTA Award for Outstanding Debut by a British Writer, Director or Producer but did not make it in the final nominations. At the 2020 NME Awards the film won two awards for Best Film and Best Film Actor for Ward.

== Plot ==
In London, a boy named Timmy starts secondary school in Peckham, Southwark, despite living in Deptford, Lewisham. His mother wants him to go to this school because of its good curriculum and so Timmy cannot be with his old friend Kiron, a trouble maker. On his first day, he befriends a boy named Marco and later on, two others named Dwayne and Hakeem.

Four years later, the boys are invited by classmate Karina to a party. Timmy, now 15, is reluctant to go but after he finds out that his longtime crush Leah is going, he reconsiders. Meanwhile, in Deptford, the Ghetto Boys are attacked by the Peckham Boys on the former's own grounds forcing them to flee. That night, Marco attempts to watch The Intent with his older brother Switcher who is the Peckham Boys leader but Switcher is called out to help fight the Ghetto Boys who have come for revenge. Later, the Peckham Boys are chased by the Ghetto Boys and the Ghetto second-in-command Galis is shot by Switcher in the back and is left to die when Ghetto leader Madder leaves due to the nearby police.

At the party, Timmy has a slow dance with Leah but is interrupted after Marco gets into a fight with another boy causing Karina's father to force everyone out. A few hours later, after Marco gets home, the police raid the apartment and arrest Switcher. The next day, Switcher is released after not having enough evidence against him and Timmy invites Leah to his house for the weekend to watch the final season of Game of Thrones while Marco goes to a college girl's house. Timmy and Leah have sex and the two start a relationship. Meanwhile, Marco runs into Kiron, who is now a Ghetto Boy nicknamed Killy, and has his arm broken by him. Whilst at school, Marco accuses Timmy of being an associate with Killy. Marco ends their friendship after insulting Leah, and slaps her in the face after she confronts him. Timmy then punches Marco in retaliation.

Three months later, Marco, Dwayne and Hakeem keep away from Timmy and Leah who are now celebrating their three-month anniversary. Marco has now become a Peckham Boy alongside Switcher. That night, Timmy is attacked by a gang and Leah is killed by being pushed to the ground and hitting her head too hard when she tries to save him. Timmy then hits one of them who picks up a brick and hits Timmy on the head with it. He accidentally lets his hood slip and is revealed to be Marco. After that, Marco is arrested for Leah's murder.

Three years later, Timmy, now 18, has become a Ghetto Boy and replaces Galis as the second-in-command. Madder recruits Timmy as his protégé. After Marco, who is now nicknamed Bricker after hitting Timmy with a brick, is released, he reveals he did not mean to kill Leah and he regrets it deeply. A few days later, Killy gets the drop on Switcher and Marco. The Ghetto Boys attack Marco and the Peckham Boys outside a nightclub. Madder is knocked out by Switcher who is stabbed by Timmy. Timmy attempts to kill Marco but the gun jams, leaving him to escape. Switcher is now disabled and has to be in a wheelchair. Marco now vows to kill off Timmy.

A week later, after many gunfights, Switcher is visited by his cousin Tyrone from Tottenham. He explains that every gang has a weak member and they just have to wait until the Ghetto Boys' is revealed. Meanwhile, a Ghetto Boy nicknamed Tiny Madder who is a close friend of Timmy is encouraged by him to make music for Link Up TV. Madder plans an attack on Peckham but is stopped by Timmy saying it's the wrong time of day. Madder argues with Timmy and insults Leah. The two then storm off.

That night, Timmy and Madder reconcile and Killy gets the drop on Marco again. When they get there though, Madder finds his gun box empty. Killy is revealed to have betrayed Timmy and is joined by Tyrone. Killy explains that he was jealous that Timmy became Madder's younger sidekick when he felt like he should’ve been. Timmy, who is trapped in a van, is approached by Marco who starts pouring petrol on the van. Madder knocks Tyrone out and wrestles with Killy before shooting him in the head. Marco sets the van alight and flees. Despite Madder's best attempts, Timmy accepts his fate, and dies by being asphyxiated by the fire. Madder finally gets the door open and pulls Timmy's body out. The police arrive and arrest Madder.

Later, as the film concludes, Madder becomes a youth worker, and Switcher (his real name revealed to be Jordan) commits suicide from a drug overdose after both Marco and Tyrone are arrested. Timmy is buried with honours.

In a credit scene, Tiny Madder's music has become famous around the UK and he vows to get revenge for Timmy by killing all the Peckham Boys.

== Cast ==
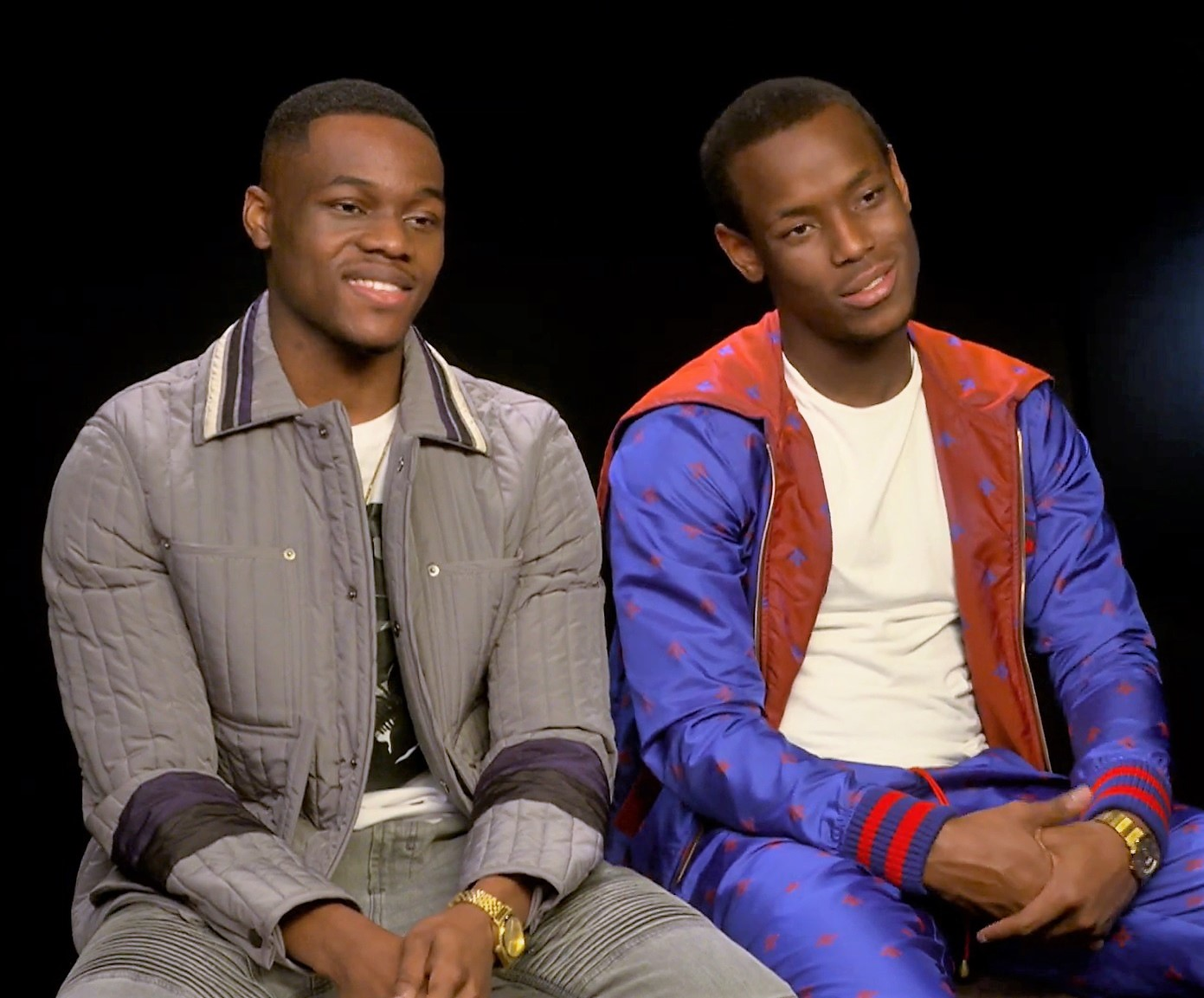
From left: Stephen Odubola and Micheal Ward discuss Blue Story in 2019

- Stephen Odubola as Timmy, a schoolboy from Deptford, Marco's best friend turned rival and Leah's love interest. After Leah's death, Timmy later become gang member as the second-in-command of Ghetto Boys leader Madder.
  - Micaiah Lewis portrays a younger version of Timmy.
- Micheal Ward as Marco, a schoolboy from Peckham, Timmy's best friend turned rival and the younger brother of Peckham Boys leader Switcher.
  - Tyler Andrew portrays a younger version of Marco.
- Khali Best as Killy/Kiron, Timmy's best friend from primary school and a member of the Ghetto Boys.
- Karla-Simone Spence as Leah, Timmy's classmate turn love interest from Peckham. She aspires to be a singer.
- Eric Kofi-Abrefa as Switcher, Marco's older brother and the leader of the Peckham Boys.
- Junior Afolabi Salokun as Madder, the leader of the Ghetto Boys. Afolabi Salokun reprises his role from the short film series.
- Kadeem Ramsey as Hakeem, one of Timmy and Marco's friends.
- Richie Campbell as Tyrone
- Ali Damiche as Dealer
- Jo Martin as Marco's Mum
- Rohan Nedd as Dwayne, one of Timmy and Marco's friends
  - Max Fincham as Young Dwayne
- Andre Dwayne as Galis, Madder's former second-in-command of the Ghetto Boys. He was killed by Switcher.

Additionally, Sean Sagar and Joshua Blisset play Skitzer and Daps, respectively, alongside Tuwaine Barrett as Striker, Duayne Boachie as Sneaks, Curtis Kantsa as Tiny Madder, Kemi Lofinmakin as Timmy's Mum, Giorgia Angelini Marquez as Karina and Jordan Peters as Cheddar. Deptford rapper DigDat cameos as the guy who beats up Marco at Karina's party and White Yardie appears as Karina's Dad. Comedian and rapper Michael Dapaah, who appeared in Shiro's Story Part 2, filmed a cameo appearance but it was cut from the final film.

== Production ==
Rapman, then known for his work on musical and short film projects, released the original Blue Story trilogy on YouTube in 2014, which was inspired by his real-life experiences as a working-class boy from Lewisham attending a school in Peckham, whilst both areas are in a postcode war. Following the feedback from the comments calling for it to be a movie, Rapman decided to write a feature-length version, which took six months to complete.

Once the script was finally finished, Rapman moved onto his next YouTube project, Shiro’s Story, a musical short film trilogy about a young black man from London who enters a violent life of crime after he learns that his girlfriend's daughter is actually his best friend's. Following the success of Shiro's Story, Rapman and BBC Films developed and co-financed the film, and in late 2018 Paramount Pictures bought worldwide distribution rights for the film. Damian Jones (of DJ Films) and Joy Gharoro-Akpojotor produced the film with Rose Garnett and Eva Yates of BBC Films; Charles Moore and Paul Grindey of Viewfinder, and Rapman were executive producers.

Principal photography began on 28 February 2019 and lasted for 23 days. The film had a budget of £1.3 million and was primarily shot in the London Borough of Enfield after Lewisham and other London boroughs refused to allow shooting, due to instructions from the office of the London Mayor, Sadiq Khan, although the director says no one at the mayor's office had actually read the script.

== Release ==
The film was released on 22 November 2019. Vue Cinemas and Showcase Cinemas in the UK decided to stop showing the film after an outbreak of violence during a screening at a cinema in Birmingham. Showcase resumed screenings a few days later. The film was released through Premium VOD in the United States on May 5, 2020, after the limited theatrical release on March 20, 2020, was cancelled due to the COVID-19 pandemic.

=== Critical response ===
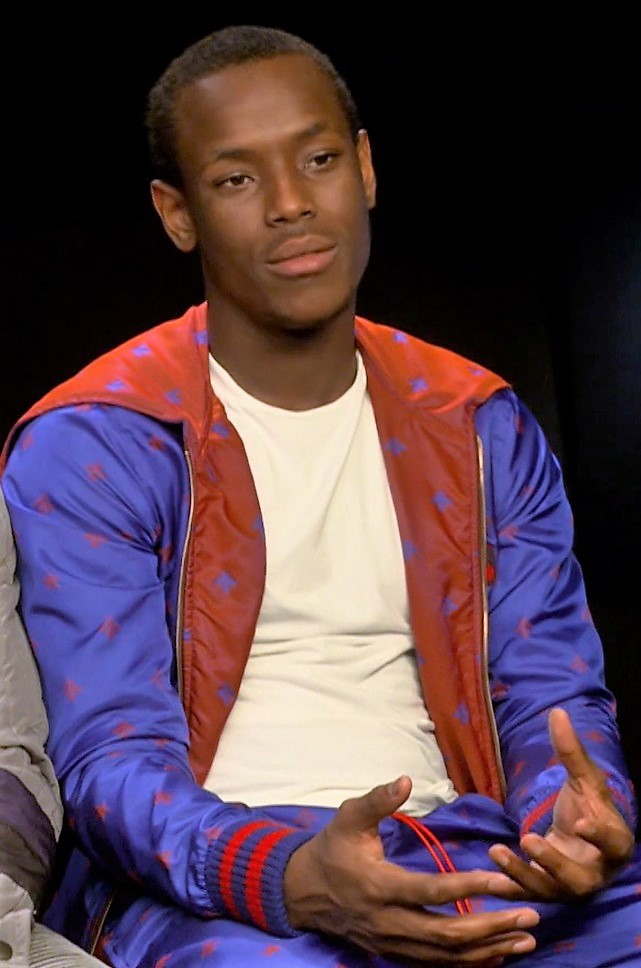
Micheal Ward's performance received critical praise and earned him the BAFTA Rising Star Award.

On the review aggregator website Rotten Tomatoes, the film has an approval rating of 93% based on 43 reviews, with an average rating of 7.00/10. The website's consensus reads, "Raw and riveting, Blue Story overcomes its somewhat prosaic story with powerful performances and an impressive clarity of purpose." On Metacritic, the film has a weighted average score of 69 out of 100 based on reviews from 15 critics, which indicates "generally favourable reviews".

Mike McCahill of The Guardian gave the film three stars out of five and called it "An assured and capably performed morality play." BBC Films say the film "powerfully depicts the futility of gang violence".

=== Awards and recognition ===
At the 73rd British Academy Film Awards, Michael Ward won the BAFTA Rising Star for his performance. The film was short-listed alongside nine other films by short-listed alongside nine other films by the British Academy of Film and Television Arts for the category of the BAFTA Award for Outstanding Debut by a British Writer, Director or Producer but did not make it in the final nominations. At the 2020 NME Awards the film won two awards for Best Film and Best Film Actor for Ward.

== Controversy ==
On 23 November 2019, The Independent reported that during a screening of Blue Story at Star City in Birmingham, England, police were attacked by a group armed with machetes. Police arrested five teenagers. Families were watching Frozen 2 when the disorder broke out, sparking an evacuation of the Star City complex, with police stating up to 100 teenagers were involved in the major disorder.

A spokesperson for West Midlands Police stated that "Dozens of officers were sent to the complex after a 999 call just after 5.30 pm reporting a group of youths with machetes. Two machetes were seized during the trouble, which saw pockets of fighting and seven police officers left with minor injuries as they dealt with the crowds in and around the cinema." On 24 November 2019, West Midlands Police reported that a sixth teenager had been added to those arrested, which had included a female aged 13, a male and female both aged 14 and a 19-year-old man.

Following the disorder at Star City, the Vue Cinemas chain cancelled all screenings of Blue Story. A statement from Vue said that during the first 24 hours of the film more than 25 significant incidents were reported and escalated to senior management in 16 separate cinemas. Cinema chain Showcase subsequently also ceased showing the film, but the Odeon and Cineworld chains continued to screen it. The ban by Showcase and Vue was labelled as racist by some people on social media, with Showcase later reversing their decision. The film's director Rapman also questioned the reasons behind the ban.

Vue also said they would restart showings, with increased security.

== See also ==
- London in film
- List of black films of the 2010s
- List of hood films
