= Rapman =

British rapper, director, producer and writer

Rapman MBE
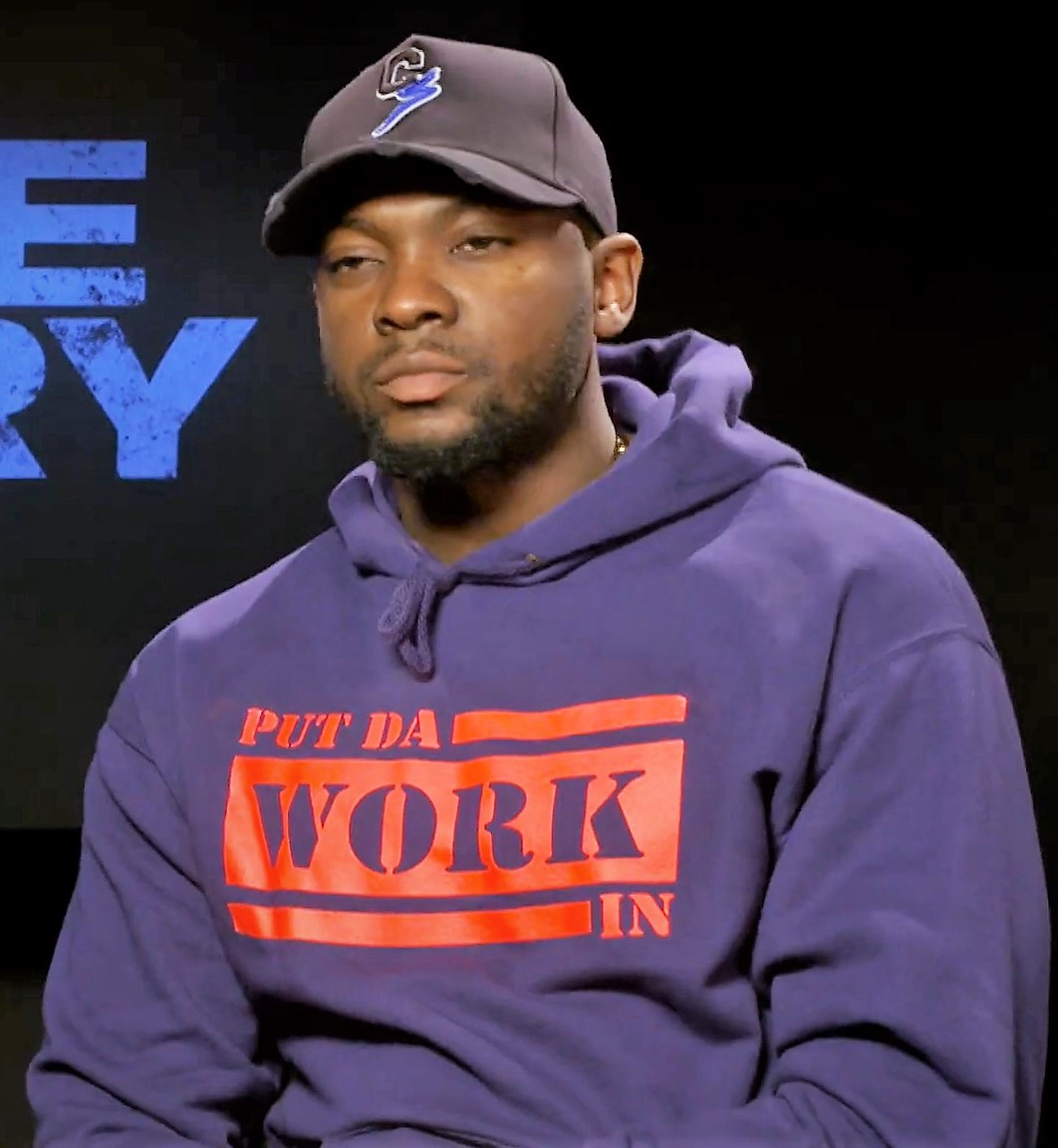
- Rapman discusses Blue Story in 2019

Background information
- Born: Andrew Onwubolu; Deptford, London, England
- Genre: British hip hop
- Occupations: Rapper; songwriter; record producer; actor; film director
- Years active: 2010–present
- Label: Roc Nation

Andrew Onwubolu MBE, better known by his stage name Rapman, is a British rapper, record producer, screenwriter, and film director. He is known for his three-part YouTube series Shiro's Story (2018), his debut feature film Blue Story (2019), and the Netflix superhero series Supacell (2024–present)

He made his debut with the Blue Story Trilogy (2013–2014), which he followed up with several charity music videos for SB.TV including Hope (2015), Pay As You Go (2016), and Promise (2017). After the success of Shiro's Story (2018), he signed with Jay-Z's Roc Nation.

Rapman was appointed MBE in the 2022 Birthday Honours from Elizabeth II for services to drama and music.

== Early life and education ==
Andrew Onwubolu was born in Deptford, London, of an Igbo mother and Yoruba father. His father was an engineer.

He was raised by his mother and from age 11 attended Sacred Heart Catholic School, Camberwell, in the midst of a "postal code war" between Deptford and Peckham.

== Music career ==
Rapman made his debut with the Blue Story Trilogy (2013–2014), which depicted two best friends from different areas of London (Peckham and Deptford) who find themselves becoming enemies in a violent and insidious postcode war between their respective areas. The series was released on the YouTube channel SB.TV and gained positive feedback.

Following the success of Blue Story, Rapman began collaborating with SBTV founder Jamal Edwards on several charity music videos for the channel. These included Hope (2015), which dealt with blood donors, Rollercoaster (2016) which dealt with suicide, Pay As You Go (also 2016), which dealt with unemployed fathers, and Promise (2017), a short film produced for Comic Relief 2017, which dealt with domestic abuse.

== Film and TV career ==
=== Shiro's Story ===
In 2018, Rapman created wrote, directed and produced the three-part YouTube musical crime drama series Shiro's Story, about a young Black man from London who enters a violent life of crime after he learns that his girlfriend's daughter is actually his best friend's. The series was inspired by a true story that Rapman heard from friends in Lewisham about a man whose daughter was actually his friend's.

Starring Joivan Wade, Percelle Ascott and Rita Bernard-Shaw, alongside rappers Konan, Deno, Ashley Walters, Headie One, Not3s and Cadet, the series was shot guerrilla-style on a budget of £3,000 and had massed over 33 million views on Link Up TV, since its release. Part 2 of the series won GRM Daily's Video of the Year award in 2018. The success of Shiro's Story led to Rapman signing a contract with Island Records and Jay-Z's Roc Nation.

=== Blue Story ===
In 2019, Rapman made his feature-length film debut by writing, directing and narrating Blue Story, a film adaptation of his YouTube series of the same name. The film, told through the medium of rap, starred Stephen Odubola, Micheal Ward, Eric Kofi-Abrefa, Khali Best, Karla-Simone Spence, Richie Campbell, Jo Martin and Junior Afolabi Salokun.

Despite the Vue Cinemas chain cancelling all screenings of the film following a machete incident in Birmingham, Blue Story received critical acclaim and grossed £4.7 million on a budget of £1.4 million, surpassing Noel Clarke's crime film Brotherhood to become the highest grossing British urban film of all time.

The film won the BAFTA Rising Star for Ward at the 73rd British Academy Film Awards and was short-listed alongside nine other films by the British Academy of Film and Television Arts for the category of the BAFTA Award for Outstanding Debut by a British Writer, Director or Producer but did not make it in the final nominations. At the 2020 NME Awards the film won two awards for Best Film and Best Film Actor for Ward.

=== Supacell ===
In February 2020, it was announced that Rapman was set to direct his second film, American Son, a remake of the 2009 French prison crime film A Prophet, starring Russell Crowe and Stephan James, for Paramount Pictures. However, it was eventually cancelled due to the negative impact that the COVID-19 pandemic had on the film and TV industry, resulting in the project being put on halt.

In November 2021, it was announced that Netflix had commissioned Supacell, a six-part superhero series created, written and directed by Rapman about a group of seemingly ordinary black-British people (a delivery driver, a gang leader, a nurse, a financially struggling father and a Cockney drug dealer) who unexpectedly develop superpowers. The series was released on 27 June 2024 to highly positive reviews from critics and audiences for its realistic portrayal of black people in Britain and for raising awareness of sickle cell disease. Upon its release, the series was number one on Netflix's global Top 10, with more than 18 million viewers in its first few weeks on the platform. In August 2024, the series was renewed for a second season.

== Influences ==
Rapman cites Tupac Shakur, the Notorious B.I.G., Nas, and Jay-Z as influences on his rap storytelling.

In regard to his filmmaking, he cites Martin Scorsese as a source of inspiration, with his favourite film being GoodFellas. Some of his other film influences include Ryan Coogler, F. Gary Gray, Paul Thomas Anderson, the Hughes Brothers, John Singleton, and Spike Lee.

== Honours and awards ==
In 2022, Rapman was appointed Member of the Order of the British Empire in the 2022 Birthday Honours from Elizabeth II for services to drama and music, through his rapping and filmmaking.
