= Micheal Ward =

British actor

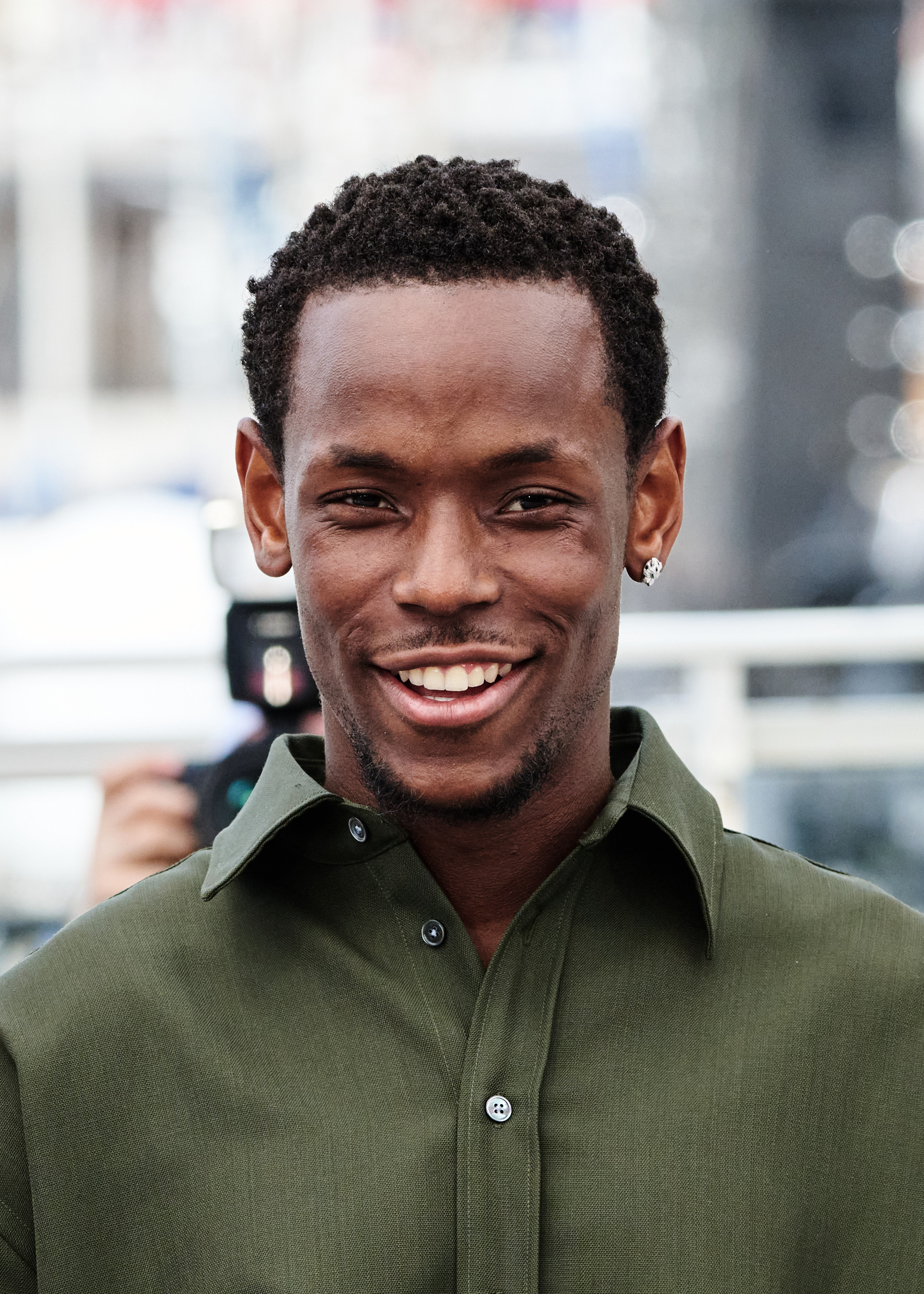
- Ward at the 2025 Cannes Film Festival
- Born: November 18, 1997 (age 28); Spanish Town, Jamaica
- Citizenship: Jamaica; United Kingdom
- Occupations: Actor; model
- Years active: 2016–present
- Awards: British Academy Film Award (2020)

Micheal Ward (born 18 November 1997) is a British actor and model. He was awarded the 2020 BAFTA Rising Star Award. He acted in the Sam Mendes drama Empire of Light (2022) for which he was nominated for the BAFTA Award for Best Actor in a Supporting Role. He has also acted in the films Blue Story (2018), The Old Guard (2020), and Eddington (2025).

On television, Ward acted in the BBC teen thriller series The A List (2018) and the Netflix crime drama series Top Boy (2019–2022). He also acted in the BBC anthology film series Small Axe (2020) earning a nomination for the BAFTA Award for Best Supporting Actor.

== Early life ==
Micheal Ward was born in Spanish Town, Jamaica to then 18-year-old mother Keisha. He has three sisters. His father was killed in a car crash when Micheal was two years old.

Ward then moved to Hackney, east London, with his mother and sister at the age of four, with the help of his aunt and uncle who ran a Caribbean restaurant in Chadwell Heath. The family later moved to Romford. He attended Chadwell Heath Academy and then studied performing arts at Epping Forest College after dropping out of sixth form. He worked delivering food for his aunt’s restaurant as a teenager and then later worked at a bookmakers shop.

== Career ==
=== 2016–2018: Modelling and early roles ===
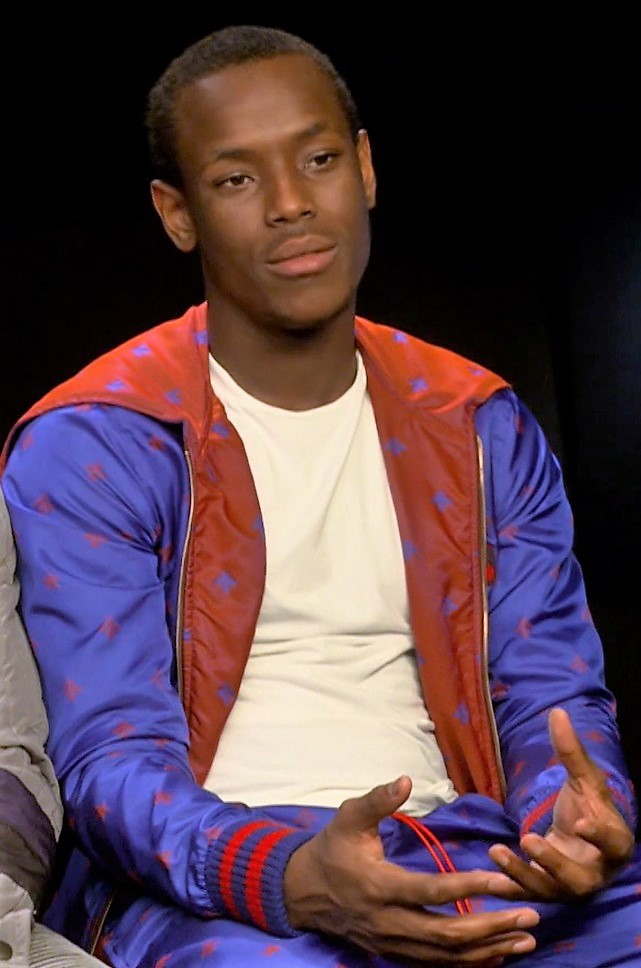
Ward in 2019

Ward began his career while he was at college when he signed with the talent agency. Through the agency, he landed roles in music videos for artists such as Lily Allen and Tom Walker. At the age of seventeen, Ward won the Face of JD Sports modelling competition. He has since modelled a number of brands and was handpicked by Virgil Abloh to model for Louis Vuitton's AW20 menswear campaign in August 2020. Ward made his film debut in Brotherhood in 2016. He starred in the first series of the teen thriller The A List on BBC iPlayer in 2018 and reprised his role for its second series on Netflix.

=== 2019–2022: Top Boy and other work ===
Ward's breakout year came in 2019, when he starred as Jamie in Netflix's revival and third series of Top Boy. He also appeared in a leading role in the film Blue Story in the same year. The film received critical acclaim, and Ward won the BAFTA Rising Star Award for his performance. Ward appeared in Steve McQueen's Small Axe: Lovers Rock in 2020, for which he received a BAFTA nomination for Best Actor in a Supporting Role.

Ward starred alongside Olivia Colman, Colin Firth and Tanya Moodie in Sam Mendes' 2022 film Empire of Light. The film was released in the USA in December 2022, with the release in the UK in January 2023. In January 2023 it was announced that Ward was included on the longlist in the best supporting actor category for the 76th British Academy of Film and Television Arts awards. In December 2022, he was cast in Jeymes Samuel's The Book of Clarence.

=== 2023–present ===
He appeared alongside Bill Nighy in the 2024 film The Beautiful Game. In 2025 he acted in the Ari Aster directed satirical western Eddington.

== Personal life ==
Ward is an Arsenal fan. He went to school with English professional footballer Rhian Brewster. Ward was named in Forbes' 30 under 30 list in 2020. Ward became a British citizen in 2015.

== Allegations and unanimous acquittal (2023–2026) ==
On 25 July 2025, the Metropolitan Police announced that the Crown Prosecution Service had authorised charges against Ward following allegations initially made in January 2023. He was charged with two counts of rape and three counts of sexual assault. The offences were alleged to have been committed in January 2023 against one woman.

The complainant alleged that there was blood on her leggings and underwear. However police forensic examination of all the relevant clothing found no trace of blood. It was revealed that she had hidden phone messages from the police and that it was not until 18 months after her original police interview she admitted having deleted parts of her messages with Ward.

Top Boy co-star Jasmine Jobson provided character evidence in support of Ward, describing him as being “lovely, polite, and outgoing” and “intelligent and hardworking, and popular”, she added that “The allegations are in stark contrast to the gentle and kind-hearted man I know.” and that she had never felt uncomfortable around him.

On 10 July 2026, at Snaresbrook Crown Court, the jury unanimously found him not guilty of all 5 charges.

== Filmography ==
=== Film ===
Year	Title	Role	Notes
2016	Brotherhood	The Supporting Artists	
2019	Blue Story	Marco	
2020	The Old Guard	Lykon	
2020	Good Thanks, You?	Lewis	Short film
2022	Beauty	Cain	
2022	Empire of Light	Stephen	
2023	The Book of Clarence	Judas Iscariot	
2024	Bob Marley: One Love	The Shooter	Uncredited
2024	The Beautiful Game	Vinny	
2025	Eddington	Michael	

=== Television ===
Year	Title	Role	Notes
2018, 2021	The A List	Brendan	Main role (series 1); Guest role (series 2)
2019–2022	Top Boy	Jamie	Main role (series 3-4)
2020	Small Axe: Lovers Rock	Franklyn	Anthology series

=== Music videos ===
Song	Year	Artist	Notes
"Blessings"	2017	Tom Walker	
"Trigger Bang"	2018	Lily Allen feat. Giggs	
"Black"	2019	Dave	

== Awards and nominations ==
Organisations	Year	Category	Work	Result	Ref.
BAFTA Awards	2019	Rising Star Award	Himself	Won	
BAFTA Awards	2021	Best Supporting Actor	Small Axe	Nominated	
BAFTA Awards	2022	Best Actor in a Supporting Role	Empire of Light	Nominated	
National Film Awards UK	2020	Best Newcomer	Blue Story	Nominated	
National Film Awards UK	2020	Outstanding Performance	Blue Story	Nominated	
NME Awards	2020	Best Film Actor	Blue Story	Won	
RTS Programme Awards	2020	Actor (Male)	Top Boy	Nominated	

== See also ==
- List of British actors
