= List of EastEnders: E20 characters =

The main characters from series 2: Naz Mehmet (Emaa Hussen), Sol Levi (Tosin Cole), Asher Levi (Heshima Thompson) and Stevie Dickinson (Amanda Fairbank-Hynes).

EastEnders: E20 is a British Internet teen soap opera, available on BBC Online, the official website of the BBC. The series is a spin-off from the long-running soap opera EastEnders and was created by Diederick Santer. The series is set in Walford, a fictional borough of London, and follows the stories of teenagers who arrive and reside at Walford's community called Albert Square in their bid to strive in overcoming from various problems.

For series 1, open auditions were held at Theatre Royal Stratford East, followed by recalls until the possible actors were reduced to eight and then four. The first series follows the characters of Zsa Zsa Carter (Emer Kenny), Fatboy (Ricky Norwood), Mercy Olubunmi (Bunmi Mojekwu) and Leon Small (Sam Attwater), who meet in the first episode and decide to squat together in a flat at 89b George Street. Leon, Fatboy and Zsa Zsa also appeared briefly in EastEnders in January 2010 before EastEnders: E20 started, and returned as regular characters when EastEnders: E20 ended. It was since announced that due to positive reaction to the character, Mercy would also join EastEnders later in 2010.

The second series follows four new characters, Asher Levi (Heshima Thompson) and his brother Sol (Tosin Cole), Naz Mehmet (Emaa Hussen), and Stevie Dickinson (Amanda Fairbank-Hynes), who move into the flat above the beauty salon at 10 Turpin Road. The third series follows Mercy's sister Faith Olubunmi (Modupe Adeyeye), Donnie Lester (Samuell Benta) and Ava Bourne (Sophie Colquhoun). Faith also appears in EastEnders for a short period before the start of the series. The three begin squatting in 3 Albert Square. Additionally, many EastEnders characters make cameo appearances in all three series.

== Cast table ==
Character	Portrayed by	Series		
Character	Portrayed by	Series 1	Series 2	Series 3
Main
Zsa Zsa Carter	Emer Kenny	Main	Guest	
Fatboy	Ricky Norwood	Main	Recurring	Recurring
Mercy Olubunmi	Bunmi Mojekwu	Main	Guest	
Leon Small	Sam Attwater	Main	Guest	
Asher Levi	Heshima Thompson		Main	
Sol Levi	Tosin Cole		Main	Guest
Naz Mehmet	Emaa Hussen		Main	Guest
Stevie Dickinson	Amanda Fairbank-Hynes		Main	
Faith Olubunmi	Modupe Adeyeye			Main
Donnie Lester	Samuell Benta			Main
Ava Bourne	Sophie Colquhoun			Main
Recurring
Lucy Beale	Melissa Suffield	Recurring		
Mo Harris	Laila Morse	Recurring		
Lucas Johnson	Don Gilet	Recurring		
Ian Beale	Adam Woodyatt	Recurring		
Andy	Steve North	Recurring		
Morgan Butcher	Devon Higgs		Recurring	
Zainab Masood	Nina Wadia	Guest	Guest	Recurring
Benjamin	Damien Lynch	Recurring		
Masood Ahmed	Nitin Ganatra	Guest	Recurring	Recurring
Heather Trott	Cheryl Fergison	Recurring	Guest	
Jane Beale	Laurie Brett	Guest	Recurring	
Malcolm Small	Paul Trussel	Recurring		
Shirley Carter	Linda Henry	Recurring		
Caroline Levi	Sandra Yaw		Recurring	
Olly Manthrope-Hall	Joshua McGuire		Recurring	
Mr Mehmet	Nayeef Rashed		Recurring	
Ekin Beg	Hemi Yeroham		Recurring	
Skolla	Tony Adigun		Recurring	
Pippa	Roxanne McKee		Recurring	
Janine Malloy	Charlie Brooks			Recurring
Richard Vance	Sam Phillips			Recurring
Riley Lester	Eliza Newman			Recurring
Tracey Bennett	Kelly Clarkson		Guest	

== Main characters ==
=== Series 1 ===
- Zsa Zsa Carter (Emer Kenny). She is the blue-haired niece of regular EastEnders character Shirley Carter (Linda Henry). She is a beautiful, funky and outspoken tomboy who is very bright, but does not like to accept anyone's help. She has a dislike of authority and does not care about other people. Zsa Zsa is similar to Shirley, though the writers said they did not plan this. The character changed greatly during the writing process and the writers were unsure who she was until filming started. She makes a cameo appearance in episode 1 of series 2 and is a regular character in EastEnders between January and September 2010.
- Fatboy (Ricky Norwood). He avoids being his real self by creating personas for himself, as he dislikes his real name and puts on a mask with his current and most sustained persona, Fatboy, a brash wheeler-dealer. He uses a lot of street slang, gets on well with his parents and gets what he wants from them. Fatboy also appears as a recurring character in series 2 of EastEnders: E20, and is one of four characters from the second series to have an official account on social networking site Twitter. He also appears in series 3. Fatboy was a regular character in EastEnders between January 2010 and December 2015.
- Mercy Olubunmi (Bunmi Mojekwu). She lives with her grandmother, from whom she is keeping a huge secret. A "good girl", she felt abandoned when her parents moved back to Nigeria. She is strong-willed, bound within her faith and motherly, but takes on other people's problems too much. She makes a cameo appearance in episode 1 of series 2 and is a regular character in EastEnders from May 2010 to June 2011.
- Leon Small (Sam Attwater). He is a boxer with a lack of respect for authority and is quick to anger, but is also described as effortlessly cool, strong-minded and sexy. His mother died when he was a child and he was left in charge of his alcoholic father, with whom he has a rocky relationship, which Attwater said is the character's weakness. He makes a cameo appearance in episode 1 of series 2 and is a regular character in EastEnders between January and September 2010.

=== Series 2 ===
- Asher Levi (Heshima Thompson). He is described as charming and sexy with the talent to make him a star. Thompson described the character as very confident and said that looking after his younger brother Sol has "taken a toll on him." He finds it difficult to refuse easy money as his brother and mother complicate things for him. Prior to his arrival in the series, he has been recently released from jail for theft, but has become a street dancer to keep him away from crime.
- Stevie Dickinson (Amanda Fairbank-Hynes). She is the privately educated daughter of rich parents who have abandoned her to go travelling. She is creative, empathetic, quirky, forward, lovely, eccentric, naïve and a daydreamer who lacks common sense but has bursts of assertiveness and intelligence. Stevie is one of four characters who has an official profile on social networking site Twitter.
- Naz Mehmet (Emaa Hussen). She is of Turkish descent and is described as being "torn between two worlds". Hussen described her as a family girl but wants to have fun, and said she is confident, but is also a daddy's girl. She is the apple of her father's eye and he sees her as a perfect student. Naz is one of four characters who has an official profile on social networking site Twitter. Naz also appears in series 3, along with Sol.
- Sol Levi (Tosin Cole). He is Asher's younger brother and is described as shy and loyal but has a bad temper and hides his feelings with violence. Cole described him as thoughtful, soft, easily hurt and dependent, and said he is reserved, finds it difficult to function without Asher and likes his family to be together. Asher has looked after Sol all his life and as a result, Sol finds it difficult to establish his own identity. Sol also appears in series 3, along with Naz.

=== Series 3 ===
The main characters from series 3 (l-r: Ava, Faith, Donnie).

- Faith Olubunmi (Modupe Adeyeye). She is Mercy's younger sister, who was sent to Nigeria by their grandmother "to get back on the straight and narrow, but she is back and worse than ever!" She is described as someone who can be "an incredible amount of fun and excitement, and she has a cheekiness that charms most people. But she's not nearly as bright as she thinks she is—she can sometimes be reckless and downright dangerous. When Faith runs into Donnie and Ava, she sees it as her chance to cause even more mischief!" Faith also has a profile on Twitter.
- Donnie Lester (Samuell Benta). His mother is absent from his life and his father is in prison, meaning he has spent a lot of time in care. He is described as "a boy of few words, but it'd be a mistake to get on the wrong side of him as he's got a temper. All Donnie wants is to get out of the system and look after his little sister Riley. However, when he meets Ava, something inside him changes—suddenly Riley isn't the only one he wants to care for..."
- Ava Bourne (Sophie Colquhoun). She is described as "a closed book [who] can look after herself." She has spent time in care, but because she comes across as certain, definite and hard, people think she is stuck up. She has a cool and brittle façade, but has a secret past which she is constantly trying to get away from. In the series is it revealed that her real name is Olivia Bryan and she was involved in an arson attack on a house she thought was empty. She is also raped by her keyworker, Richard.

== Recurring characters and EastEnders character cameos ==
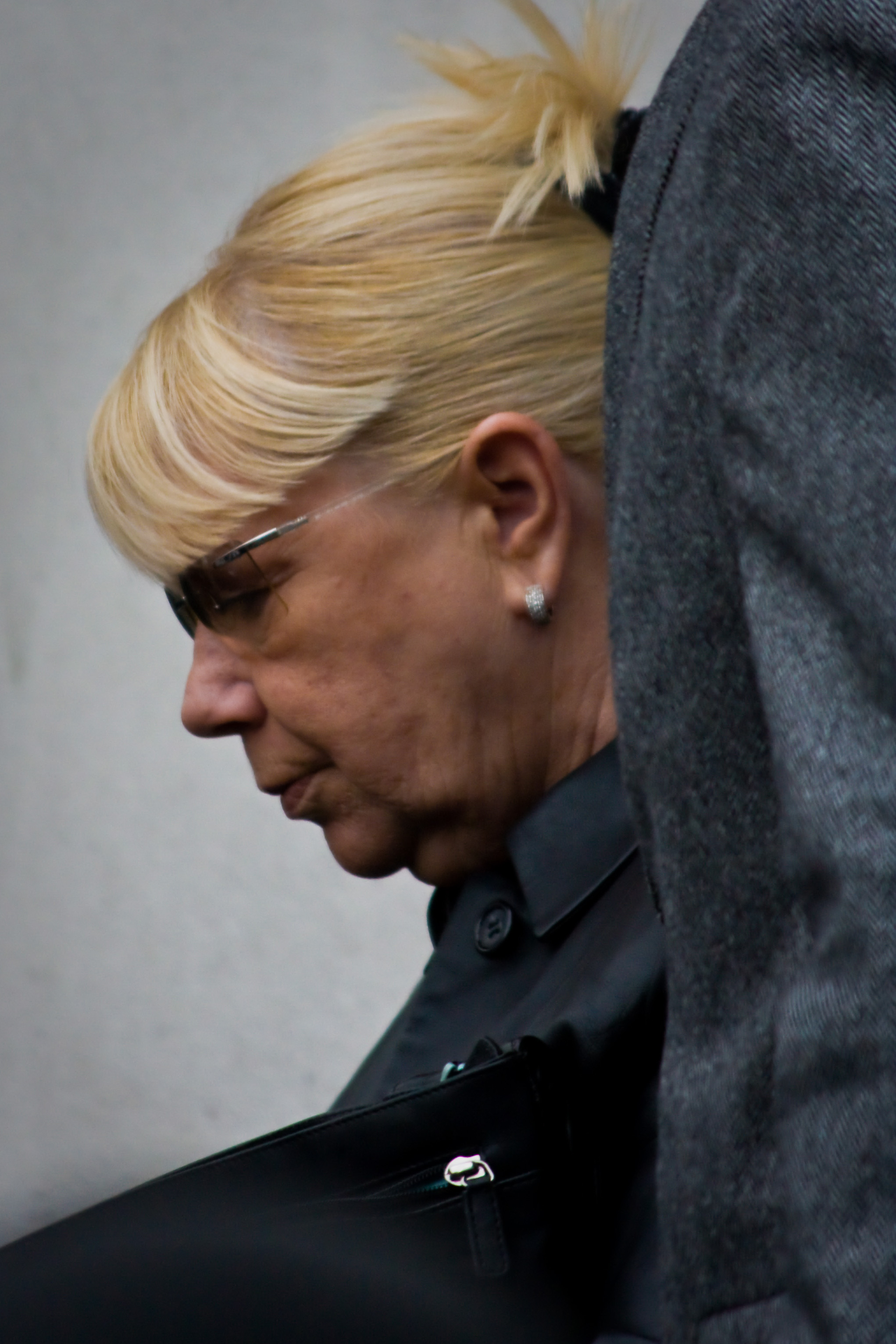
Laila Morse appears as her regular EastEnders character, Mo Harris, in series 1.

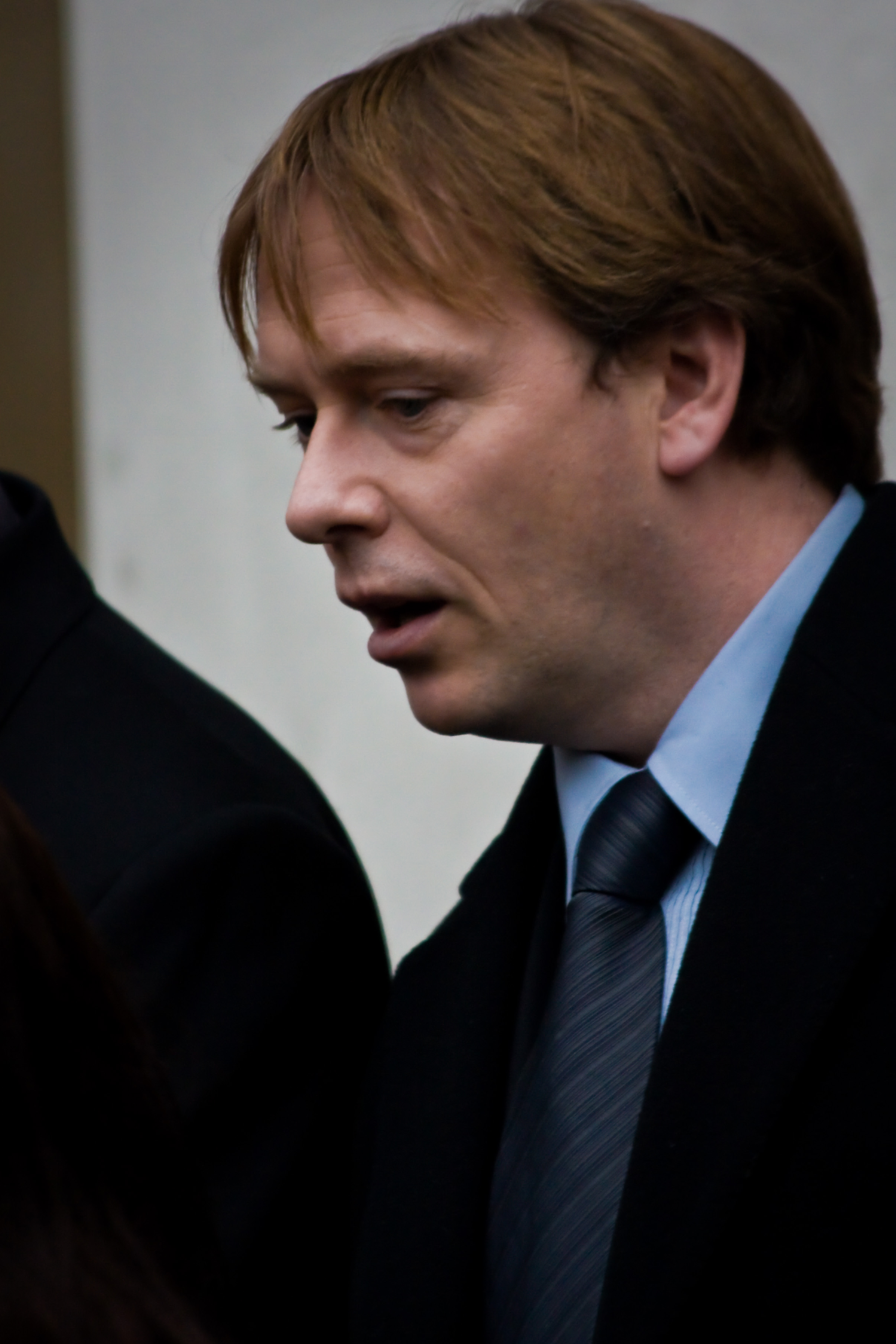
Adam Woodyatt appears as Ian Beale in two episodes of series 1.

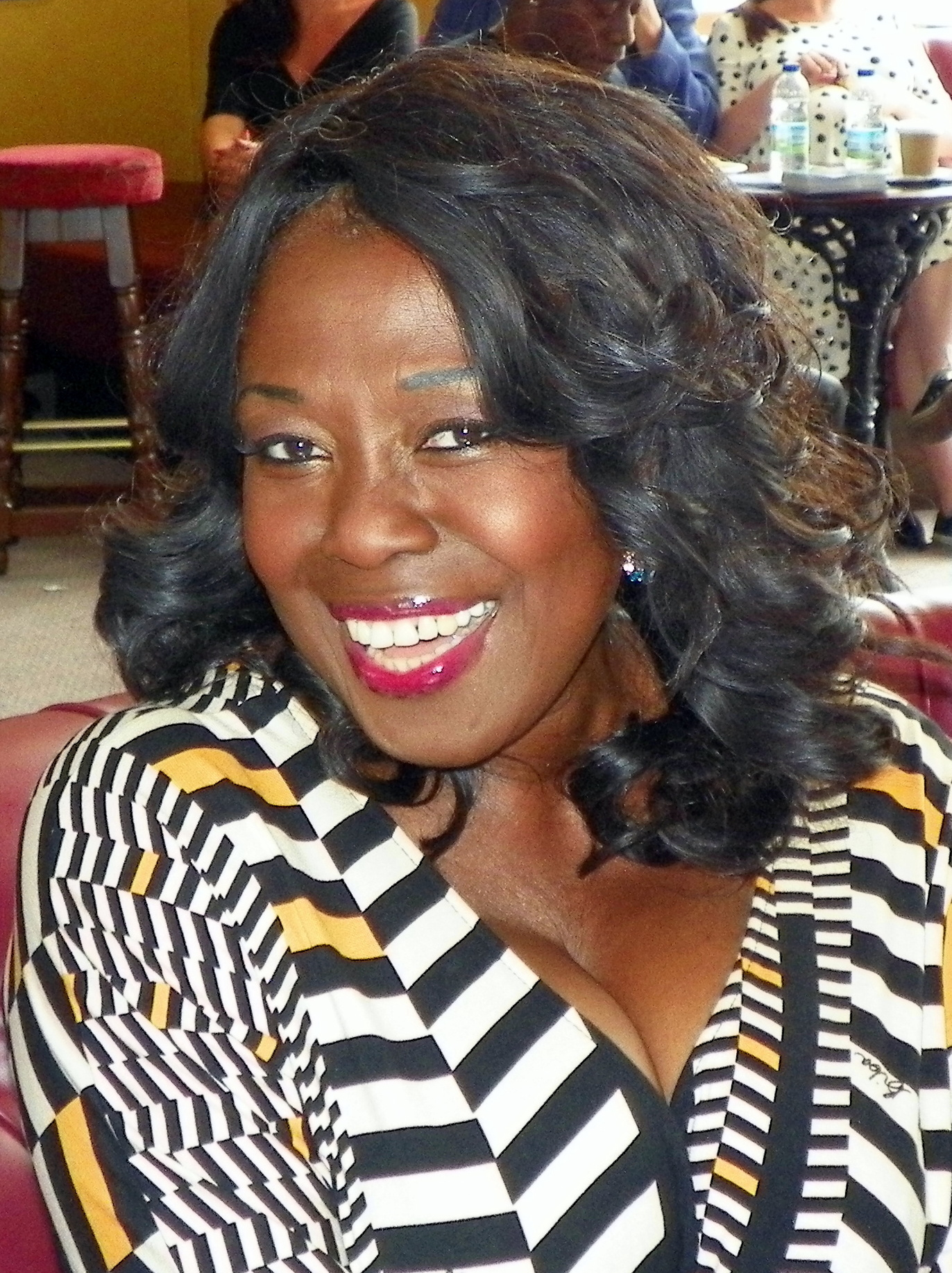
Ellen Thomas plays Grace Olubunmi in series 3.

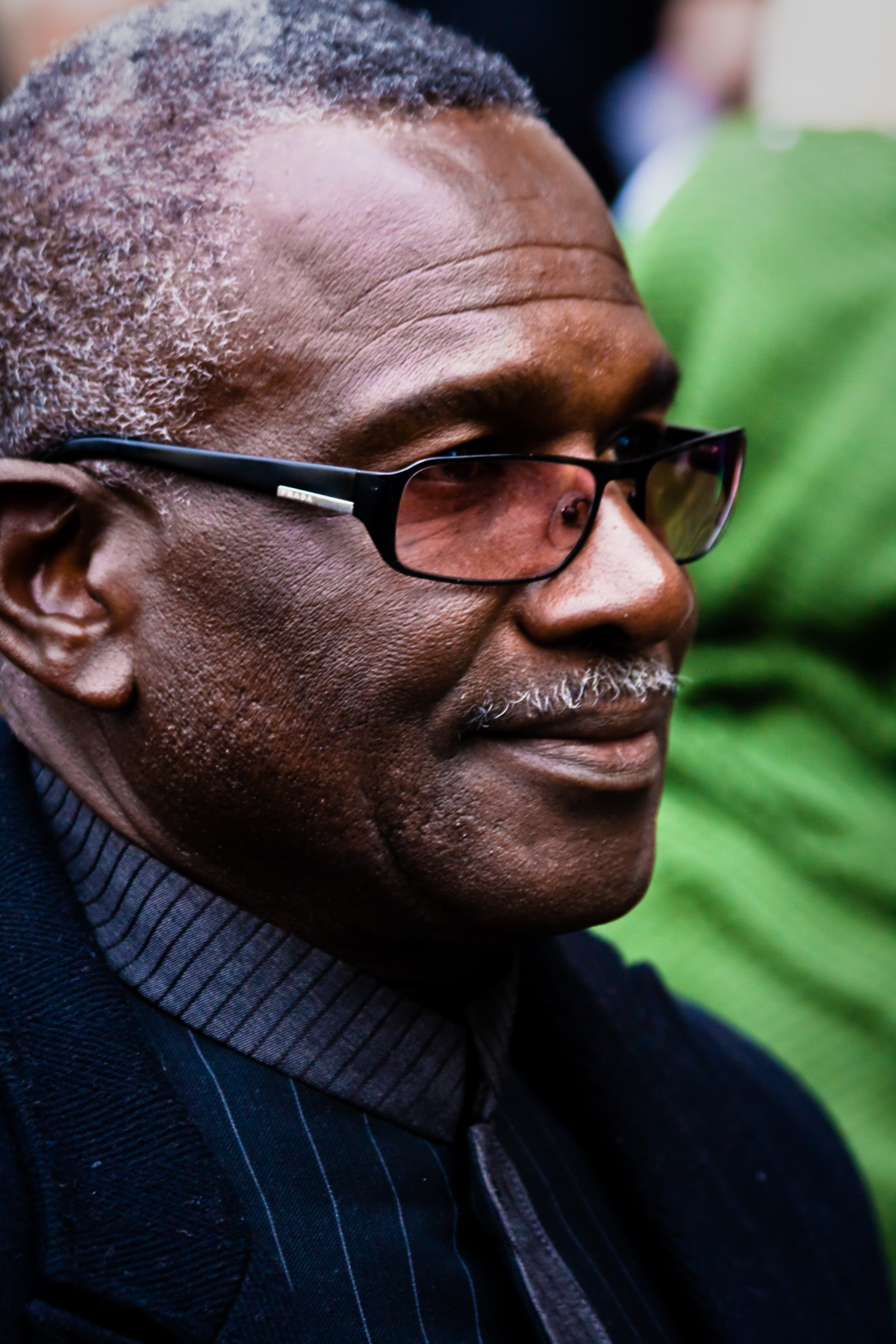
Rudolph Walker makes cameo appearances as Patrick Trueman in series 1 and 2.

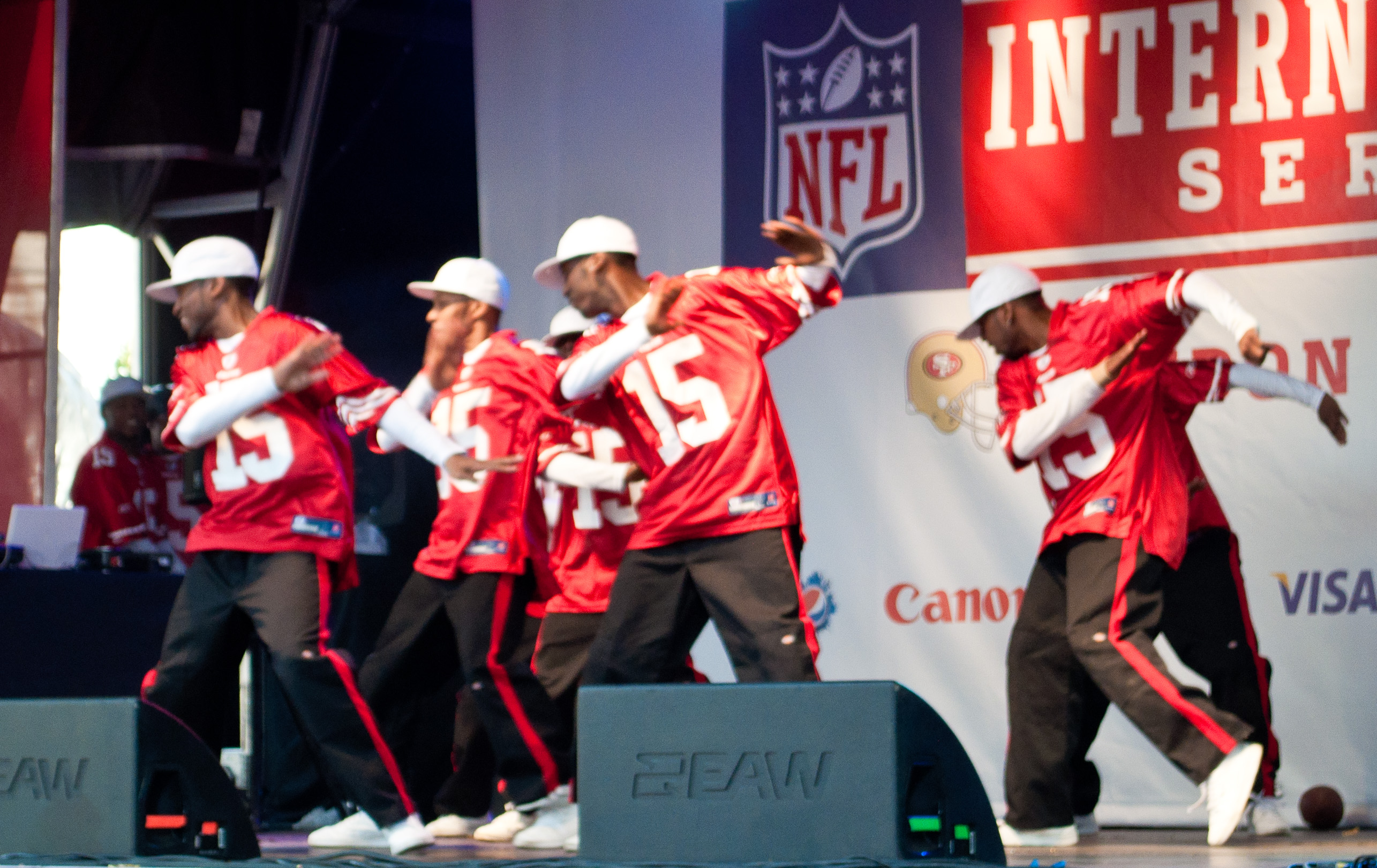
Marlon Wallen appears as himself along with the rest of his dance group, Flawless, in series 2.

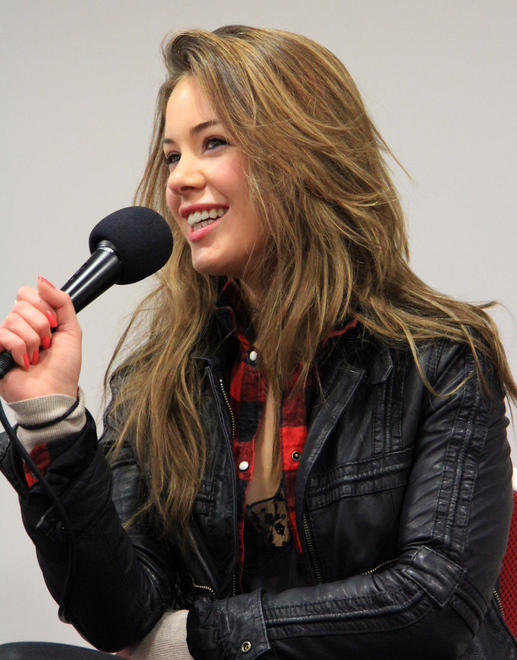
Roxanne McKee plays Pippa throughout series 2.

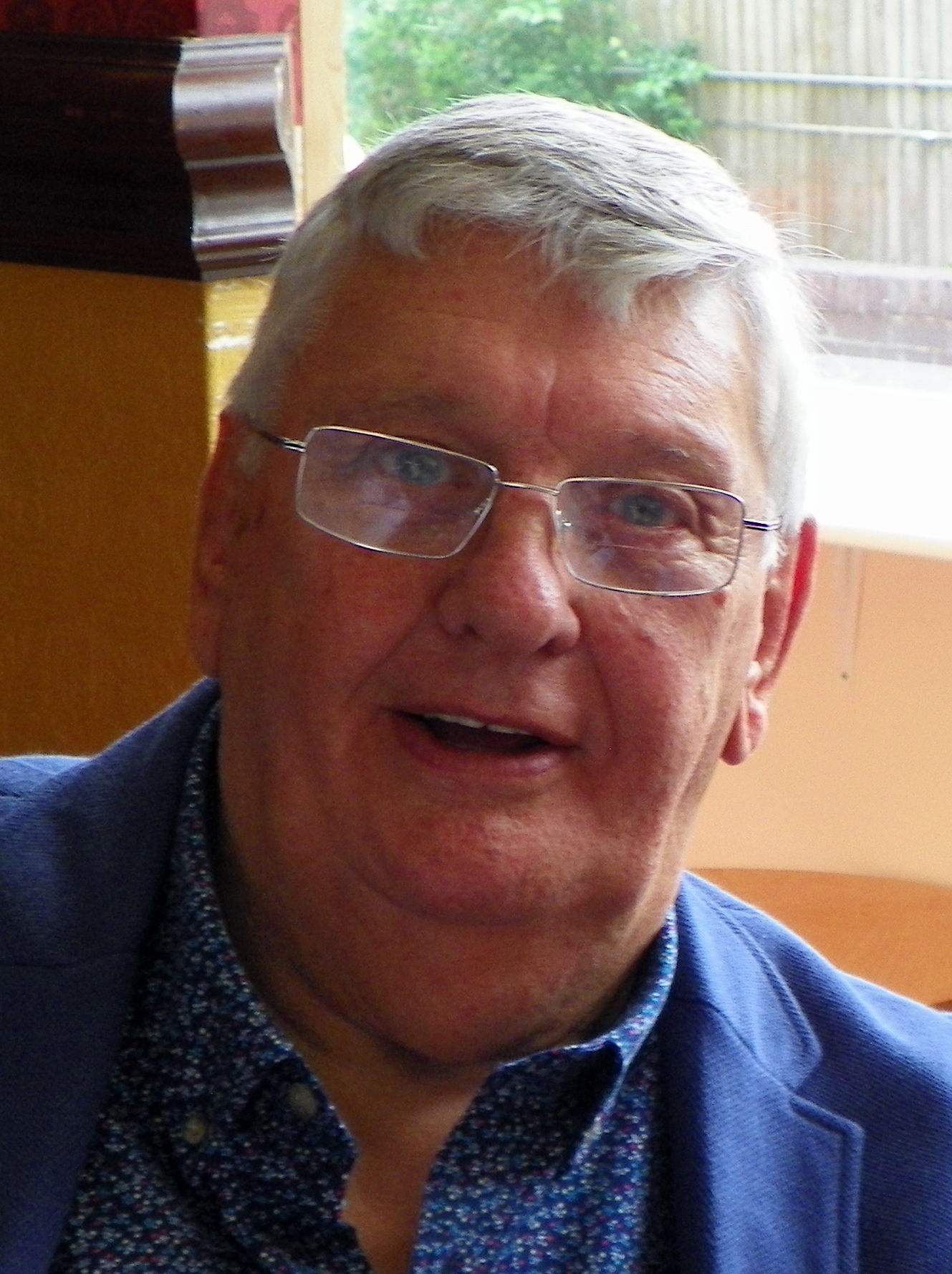
Derek Martin plays Charlie Slater in episode 6 of series 2.

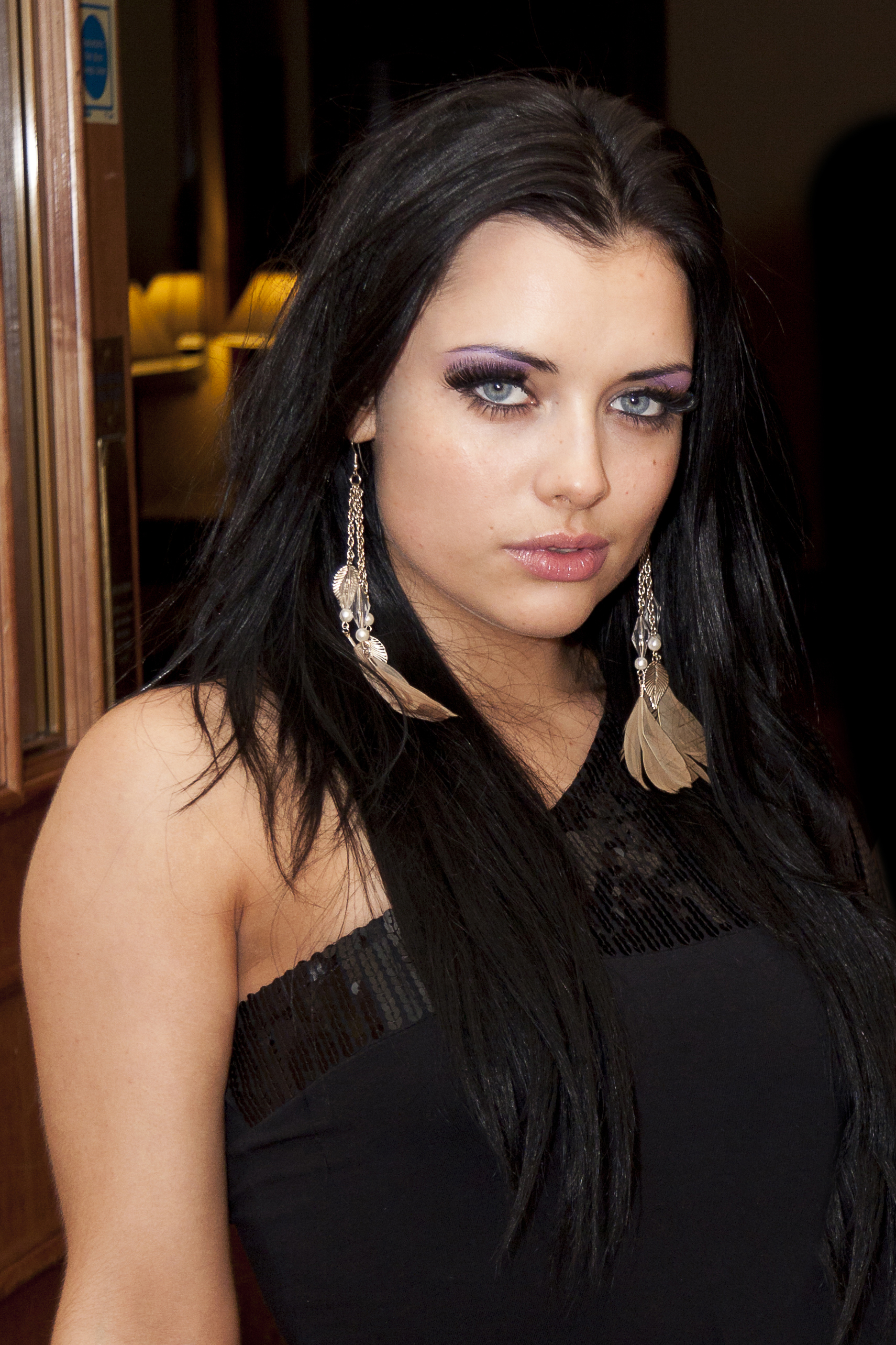
Shona McGarty appears as Whitney Dean in series 2, episode 8.

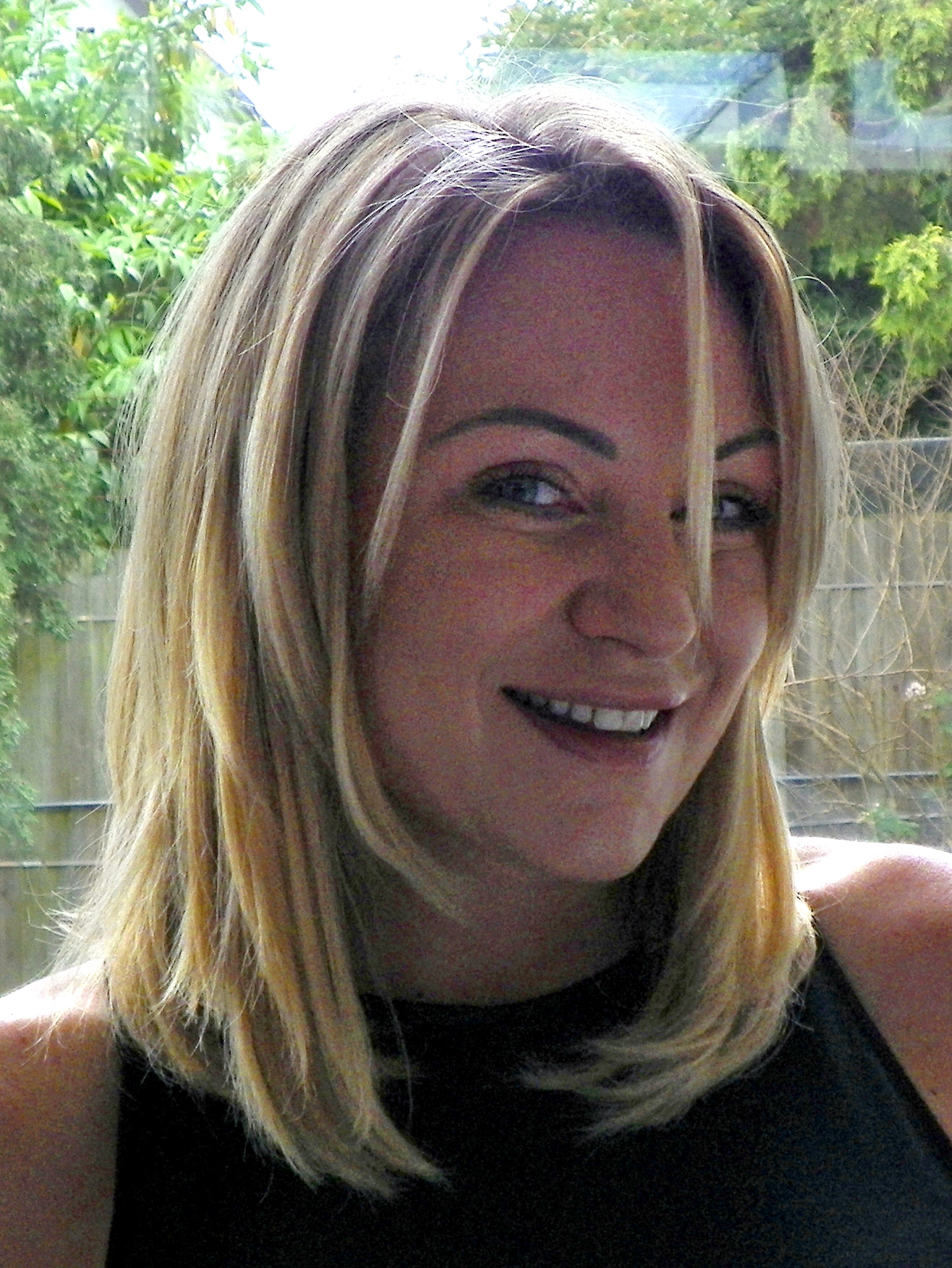
Rita Simons plays Roxy Mitchell in episode 9 of series 2.

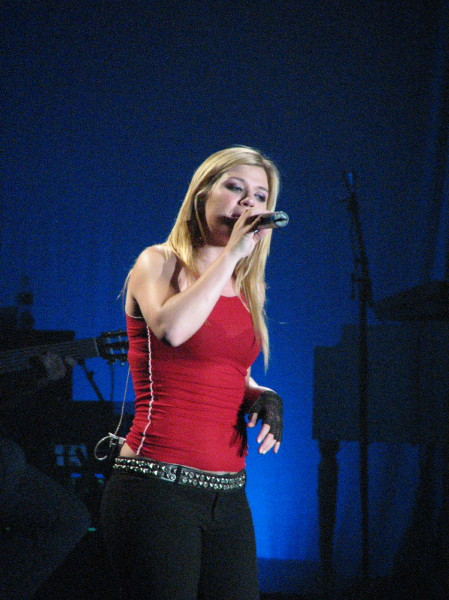
Kelly Clarkson plays Tracey Bennett in one episode of series 2

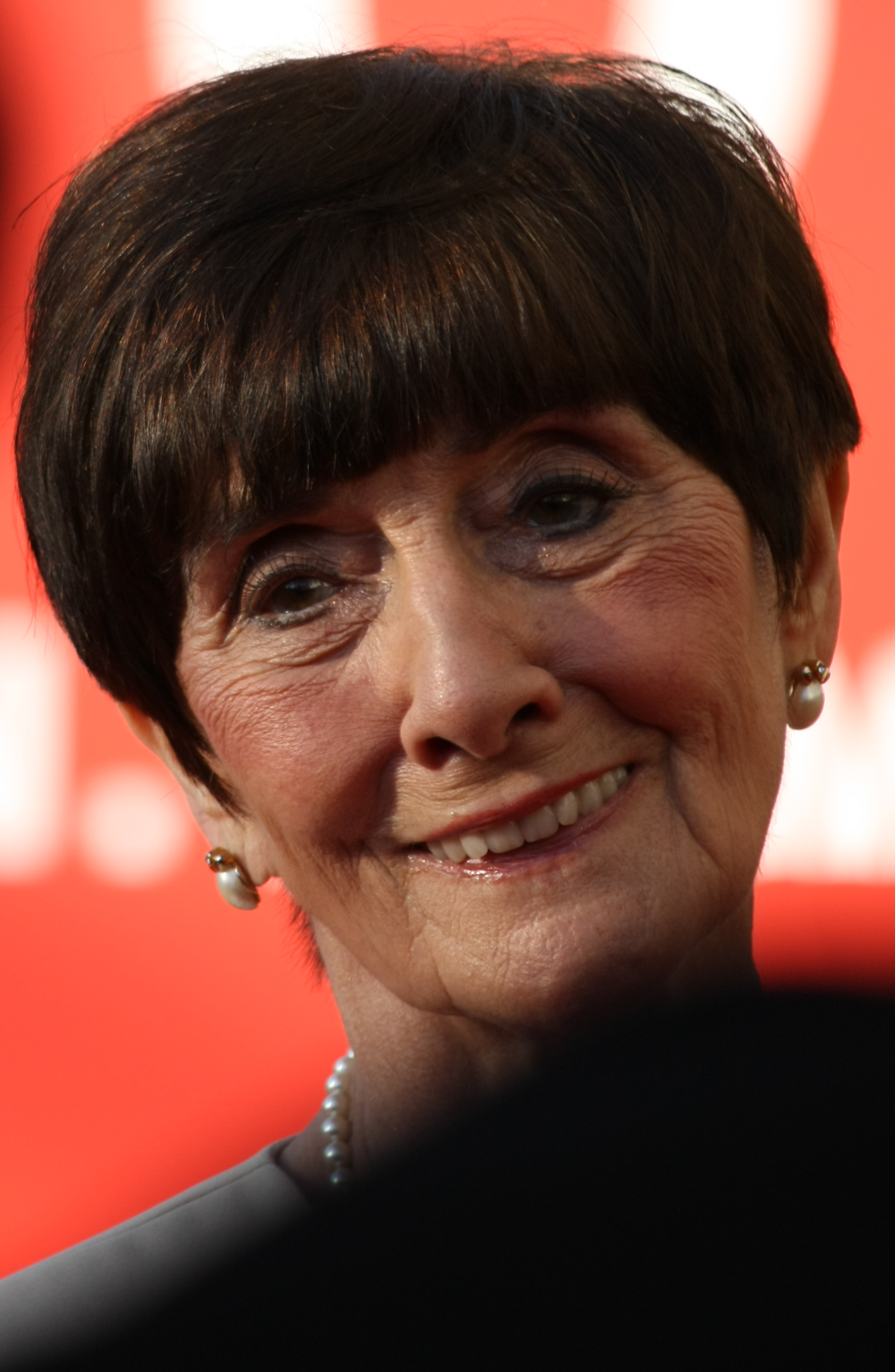
June Brown plays Dot Branning in two episodes of series 3

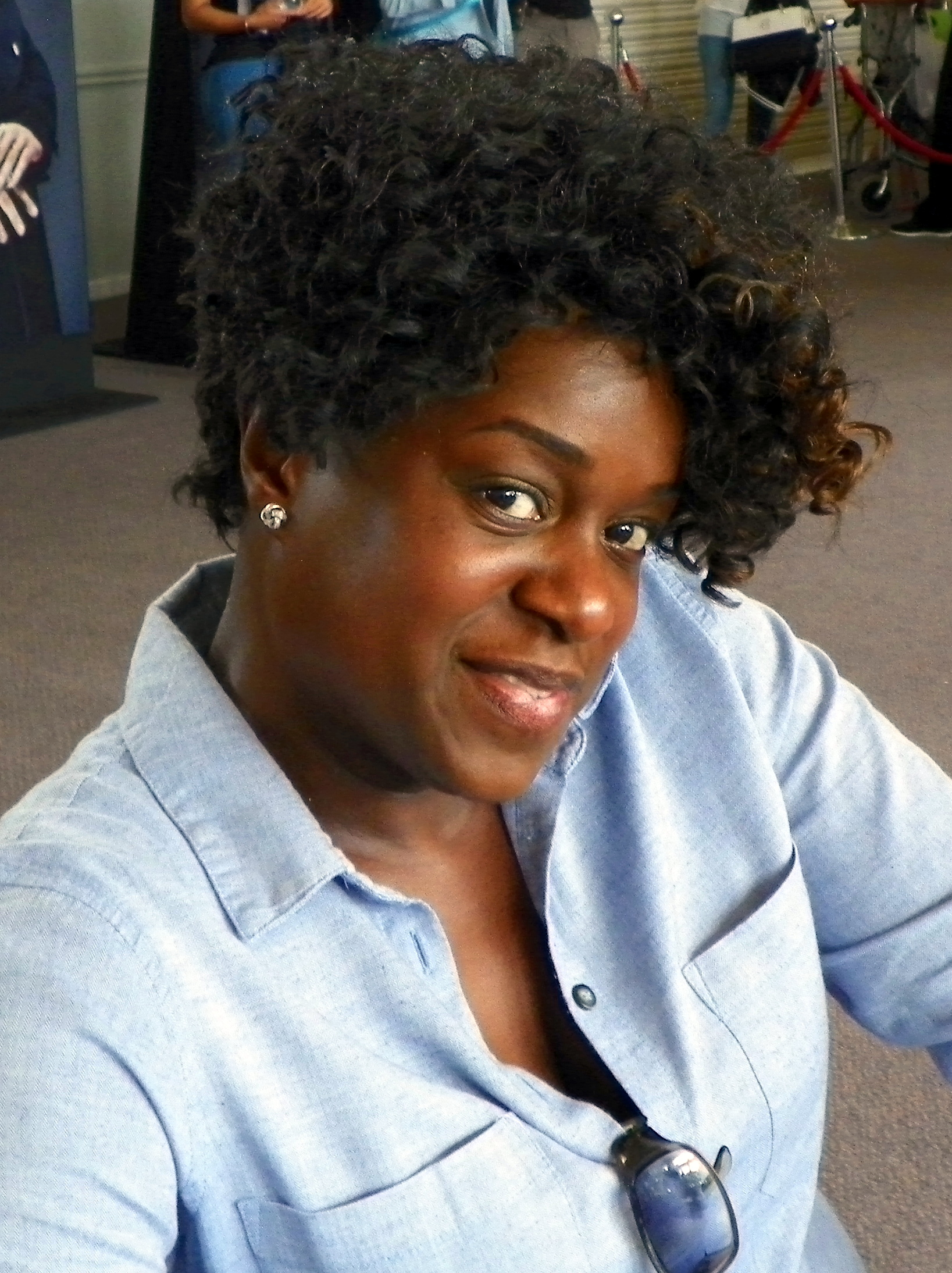
Tameka Empson plays Kim Fox in one episode of series 3.

=== Introduced in series 1 ===
- Andy (Steve North) – the ex partner of Zsa Zsa's mother (Tina Carter, introduced to EastEnders in 2013). In episode 1 he chases after Zsa Zsa and assumes she is inside 89b George Street. He shouts that he wants his money and dumps her belongings in the street, dropping his satellite navigation system. Lucy points out where Zsa Zsa is hiding, so Andy chases after her again. He is beaten up by Leon, allowing Zsa Zsa to get away. Returning to his car, he realises his sat nav has gone. When he sees Zsa Zsa, Leon, Mercy and Fatboy, he chases them in his car as they run into 89b George Street, and demands his sat nav back, which Fatboy found. Zsa Zsa throws it out of the window and tells Andy to leave.
- Zainab Masood (Nina Wadia) – Zainab appears in episode 1 when Zsa Zsa runs past her, then Andy, who is chasing Zsa Zsa, runs into her. She also appears in series 2, where in episode 3, she attends a dance class run by Roger, but assumes Asher is Roger as Roger is late. When Roger arrives, Asher runs off with the money and Zainab finds him, telling him to keep the money but advising him to stick to dancing rather than stealing. In series 3, Zainab is against a hostel being in her neighbourhood, and forces Faith, Donnie and Ava to clean up after two of them cause mayhem across Albert Square.
- Benjamin (Damien Lynch) – The church's youth minister who works with Mercy on her project to bring younger people to the church. In episode 1 he is disappointed when Fatboy shows his website plans. In episode 2 Fatboy greets him and his wife Celia in the church, and in episode 3 he visits Mercy in the café and says her grandmother is worried about her spending so much time with her new friends. She then asks him to lend her £20. In episode 8 he speaks to Mercy about her project. Fatboy speaks to him about Mercy being in trouble, which Benjamin thinks means she has a new boyfriend. Later, Mercy tells him she is pregnant by him. In episode 10, he approaches Mercy saying they need to talk, but she sends him away. When Mercy suffers a miscarriage, Fatboy brings Benjamin to the flat but Mercy is already on her way to the hospital. At the hospital in episode 11, Benjamin tells Mercy it worked out for the best, leaving her annoyed. He tells her not to worry about the website as she has been through a lot.
- Lucas Johnson (Don Gilet) – Lucas holds services and Bible classes at the Community Centre in episodes 1 and 2.
- Lucy Beale (Melissa Suffield) – In episode 1 Lucy is in 89b George Street with Leon. They kiss passionately until they are interrupted by Andy looking for Zsa Zsa. Lucy points out where Zsa Zsa is, upsetting Leon, who says they are over. In episode 2, the gang attempt to steal Lucy's keys by pretending that Mercy is drunk so that Lucy drops her bag, which Zsa Zsa returns when Lucy is in the café's toilet. Zsa Zsa tells Lucy she hates her.
- Celia (Marsha Henry) – Benjamin's wife, who appears alongside him at the church in episodes 1 and 2.
- Mo Harris (Laila Morse) – In episode 1, Fatboy attempts to sell Mo items he found on the street that actually belong to Zsa Zsa, and she is interested until Fatboy offers her an old toy. In episode 12, she sees Fatboy, Zsa Zsa and Leon leaving Albert Square in a milk float they have stolen.
- Masood Ahmed (Nitin Ganatra) – In episode 1, Masood appears when Fatboy attempts to sell him Zsa Zsa's belongings that he found but he leaves when Leon interrupts. Masood also appears in series 2. In episode 2, he is on the tube clutching his rucksack and Stevie suspects he is a terrorist, and tells him that love can heal his pain but Naz pulls her away. Later, a drunken Stevie apologises and when Masood notices she is cold and wet, he offers her his coat. In episode 4, Stevie returns the coat to Masood while he is working on the market and she attempts to flirt, however, it is a disaster. After Naz gives her tips, she goes back and flirts again, and asks if Masood has any work going. He asks her to come back tomorrow and Stevie thinks her flirting was successful so goes over the top and flashes him her bra. In episode 6 he comes out during the power cut and asks why Stevie's is the only flat with electricity. In episode 10, Stevie tells him that one day they will have tea together and kisses him before running off. In episode 1 of series 3, Masood gives Ava free food when she tells him she has been mugged, though it is a lie.
- Heather Trott (Cheryl Fergison) – Zsa Zsa runs into Heather in episode 2 and recognises her baby son George from a photo. In episode three, Zsa Zsa visits Heather in the launderette and steals Heather's purse while she is on the telephone. Leon goes into the launderette, stripping to his boxer shorts and leaving Heather embarrassed. Heather realises her purse is missing but Zsa Zsa returns it, saying she found it on the street. In episode 6, Heather asks Zsa Zsa to babysit George. In episode 9, she suggests that Zsa Zsa go back to stay with her mother after Shirley asks her to go home. She also appears in series 2, where in episode 3, Asher and Sol go into the launderette and she thinks they are going to rob her.
- George Trott (uncredited) – Heather's baby. He appears in episodes 2, 5 and 6.
- Jane Beale (Laurie Brett) – In episode 2, Jane is working in the café where Fatboy attempts to chat her up. She also appears in series 2. In episode 3 she is seen briefly talking to a girl outside the café, and in episode 8 she confronts Asher about some trainers he sold to her step son. He says he does not give refunds so she snatches his wallet and takes some money out but he snatches it back. Jane tells PC Adams and his colleague that Asher is a thief and they chase after him. In episode 10, Asher tells Jane he will refund her, and when Sol calls him, she lets him go.
- Malcolm Small (Paul Trussel) – Leon's alcoholic father who kicked him out before the start of the series. He phones Leon in episode 3 and Leon says he could be charged with grievous bodily harm. He first appears in episode 4 when he leaves the police station and phones Leon, but Leon does not answer. He interrupts Leon's training session at the community centre and asks for his money back. Leon does not know what he means but they go back to the flat and Malcolm punches Leon, taking the money Leon and his friends have saved. In episode 5, Leon gets a call to say Malcolm is in hospital. In episode 9, Leon visits him but he has discharged himself, and does not answer his phone.
- Coach Roberts (Grant Davis) – Leon's boxing coach. He appears during episode 4 while Leon is training and attends Leon's boxing match in episode 12. Zsa Zsa turns up late and Coach Roberts tells her was missed his fight and he has gone.
- Ian Beale (Adam Woodyatt) – In episode 4, Fatboy and Mercy ask Ian for patties in his chip shop, and Fatboy accuses him of racism. He shows a potential tenant around 89b George Street while Zsa Zsa and Leon are hiding in a wardrobe, and Ian inadvertently locks them in it. In episode 12, he sees a party going on at 89b George Street and attempts to stop it. When the police arrive, they ask if it is his flat and when he confirms it, he looks worried that they will arrest him.
- Nurse Warren (Rhiannon Harper-Rafferty) – A nurse who Mercy consults about abortion in episode 5. She also appears in episode 9 of series 2, where she is caring for Sol and Asher's mother Caroline.
- Shirley Carter (Linda Henry) – Zsa Zsa's aunt. In episode 5, she sees Zsa Zsa and tells her to leave as there is nothing for her there. In episode 7, Shirley answers the door to Leon and tells him Zsa Zsa's father is dead, as Zsa Zsa said she is visiting him. In episode 9, she pays Zsa Zsa to leave. In episode 11, Leon goes to Shirley's house looking for Zsa Zsa, but Shirley says Zsa Zsa has probably left Walford. In episode 12, Zsa Zsa runs past Shirley who tells Zsa Zsa she is going in the wrong direction, and Zsa Zsa returns the money Shirley paid her.
- Tamwar Masood (Himesh Patel) – Tamwar is seen in episode 8 when Mercy asks him for help with her project. Later, Fatboy sees them talking and accuses Tamwar of sleeping with Mercy and getting her pregnant. Tamwar also appears in series 2, where in episode 3, he delivers a curry to Stevie but finds her waiting in bed as she was expecting his father Masood who she had an erotic dream about. Tamwar takes the curry back when Stevie is unable to pay. In episode 5, Naz flirts with Tamwar, then asks if he would give her some food for free, saying if he does, one day he can touch her breasts.
- Grace Olubunmi (Jay Byrd in series 1, Ellen Thomas in series 3) – Mercy's grandmother, who is credited in series 1 as Mrs Olubunmi. She will fund Mercy's college education if her church project is successful. Mercy phones her in episode 1 to say she is not coming home, and in episode 2 Mercy has 12 missed calls from her, as she is upset about Fatboy's website design for the project. Mercy speaks to her and then Fatboy tells her everything will be fine. She appears in episode 8 at the community centre, saying she has barely seen Mercy in the past week, that Fatboy is a bad influence on her and that Mercy thinks she is grown up but she is just a child. She reappears in EastEnders following Mercy's transition into the main show, played by Ellen Thomas. Thomas also appears as Grace in series 3, along with her granddaughter Faith, where, in episode 1, she ejects Faith from her home, forcing her to squat in 3 Albert Square.
- Patrick Trueman (Rudolph Walker) – Fatboy convinces Patrick to sell him alcohol from his shop, the Minute Mart, despite having no identification. He also appears in series 2, where in episode 3, Stevie attempts to buy drinks from the shop but her payment card is declined. In episode 5, Naz goes to the shop asking for products that Patrick does not sell, and he asks her not to shop there any more. She later asks if he has seen Stevie.
- Libby Fox (Belinda Owusu) – In episode 9, Fatboy sees Libby walking down the street and makes up a story about her.

=== Introduced in series 2 ===
- Caroline Levi (Sandra Yaw) – Asher and Sol's mother, who throws Asher out in episode 1, threatening to kill him and Sol. In episode 7, Sol returns home but discovers from a neighbour that Caroline has been taken away, though the neighbour does not know where. In episode 9, Sol is with her in hospital, after she was picked up by police in the middle of the road with no shoes, though she is unconscious. It is revealed she is schizophrenic. In episode 10 she is conscious but still in hospital.
- Olly Manthrope-Hall (Joshua McGuire) – Stevie's boyfriend. Olly has a profile on social networking site Twitter revealing that he is already living in Walford with Stevie prior to the start of the series and he enjoys cycling. Further posts show that he went out on their anniversary and she hoped to make the relationship work but he hinted that he would end it. In episode 1, he ends his relationship with Stevie after they have sex and in episode 2 he goes to the flat asking Stevie for the rent money. In episode 4 he returns to the flat to take some of the furniture as his new flat is unfurnished. In episode 7 he barges in saying he will have to let the flat go as he needs his deposit, but Stevie asks for one more day. In episode 8 he goes to the flat and Stevie hands him the money but he says he has given notice anyway and they have one more day before moving out. In episode 9, he calls and texts Stevie but she ignores him until later when she invites him to the flat. When he arrives, he says he has ended his relationship with Pippa and wants Stevie back. She blindfolds him and handcuffs him naked to a chair, then makes him wear a dress so he has to go home in it.
- Billy Mitchell (Perry Fenwick) – In episode 1, Billy is angered when his fruit and veg is knocked over twice, and calls the police. In episode 7 he witnesses a fight between Asher and Sol in front of his stall.
- PC Adams (Andrew Watson) – A police officer who speaks to Sol and Billy in episode 1 after Billy calls them about his stock being knocked over. In episode 8 he and his colleague chase after Asher when Jane tells them he is a thief, and they later stop Sol asking if he knows where Asher is.
- Mr Mehmet (Nayeef Rashed) – Naz's father. In episode 1, she hears him shouting through the front door and in episode 3, she goes home to her parents' where it is revealed that Naz and Ekin are to be married. In episode 9, after Naz has packed to visit Turkey with Ekin, he finds she has escaped through a window. In episode 9, he and Ekin drive to Walford to find Naz and take her to the car, but Sol stops it and Naz gets out and kisses him. Later, Mr Mehmet is happy for her and they hug.
- Ekin Beg (Hemi Yeroham) – A taxi driver who Naz avoids in episode 2, but in episode 3 he finds her and takes her home where it is revealed they are to be married. In episode 4 he goes to Stevie's flat and reveals to Naz's friends that he and Naz are engaged. In episode 5, Asher meets Ekin to tell him to stay away from Naz as she is seeing someone. Ekin later returns to Walford and asks Sol to pass on a message that Asher is not Naz's boyfriend and he should stick to his own kind. He appears in episode 9 with Naz and her parents before they are due to travel to Turkey to meet his parents. Naz escapes through a window and in episode 10, Ekin and Mr Mehmet drive to Walford to find Naz and take her to the car, but Sol stops it and Naz gets out and kisses him.
- Marlon Wallen (himself) – Marlon and Skolla are in charge of the dance auditions attended by Fatboy, Asher and Sol. Marlon appears in episode 1 and again in episode 10 where he allows Sol to perform solo at the dance-off, and later performs with the rest of his dance group, Flawless.
- Skolla (Tony Adigun) – Marlon and Skolla are in charge of the dance auditions attended by Fatboy, Asher and Sol. Skolla accepts a bribe from Asher in episode 1 to allow Sol through. In episode 5, the crew dance at callbacks but Skolla tells Sol he is too slow and asks him to do the routine solo. Sol is put off by the audience and leaves, and Asher assures Skolla that Sol is a good dancer. In episode 7, Asher turns up late for rehearsals so Skolla asks him to leave. When a fight breaks out between Asher and Sol, Skolla helps to break it up and says he wants neither of them back, revealing that Asher bought Sol's place. In episode 10, Skolla and the rest of the dance crew perform at the dance-off.
- Araminta (Arabella Langley) – In episode 2, Araminta has a birthday party where Stevie says she is making her boyfriend wait for sex. She dances with Asher, and they end up having sex. Afterwards, she invites him to a club night later in the week and they are interrupted by her boyfriend.
- Pippa (Roxanne McKee) – Olly's new girlfriend. She is described as rich, attractive and sophisticated. McKee said she was "excited and proud to be part of this production." Mckee described the character to Digital Spy as generous and "always out for a good time", and said that Pippa's main role in the series is to drive Stevie's story forward. Pippa appears in episode 2 at Araminta's party, where Stevie badmouths her ex-boyfriend Olly, but Pippa introduces Olly as her new boyfriend. Stevie insults Pippa, who pushes her into the punch bowl. In episode 6, Stevie and Pippa bump into each other in a club and become friendly. In episode 7, they wake up in bed together at the flat, and she realises what sort of a person Olly is when she overhears him threatening to evict Stevie for not meeting his deadline for the deposit on the flat. Stevie is uncomfortable when Pippa wants her to return to bed and tries to hurry her out of the flat when Pippa comes out of the shower and walks around the kitchen wearing only a towel. Pippa decides to help Stevie by writing her a cheque for Olly's deposit. She tells Stevie not to waste her time on someone like Olly and asks her to call her before leaving. In episode 9, Olly tells Stevie he has ended his relationship with Pippa.
- Mrs Mehmet (Myriam Acharki) – Naz's mother who appears in episode 3 and again in episode 9, where Naz asks her if she ever had a dream when she was Naz's age. She says her dream was to marry Naz's father, but later tells Naz she wanted to be a hairdresser.
- Charlie Slater (Derek Martin) – In episode 6, Charlie is having his dinner in front of the television when the electricity goes off, caused by Sol and Stevie.
- Whitney Dean (Shona McGarty) – Whitney appears in episode 8 when Asher sells her a pair of trainers, however, she returns them saying they are different sizes. He says he cannot refund her so Jane, who has had a similar experience, snatches his wallet and takes some money, but Asher snatches it back and runs off.
- Roxy Mitchell (Rita Simons) – Roxy appears in episode 9 when Stevie is due to leave the flat. Stevie asks to stay and tells Roxy she will go to the council about all the safety violations she has found, so Roxy allows her to stay.
- DJ Ace (himself) – DJ Ace DJs at the dance-off in episode 10.
- Tracey Bennett (Kelly Clarkson) – Tracey watches Liam in the dance-off in with DJ Ace in episode 10.

=== Introduced in series 3 ===
- Dot Branning (June Brown) — Dot is seen with Fatboy in episode 1 when Faith asks if she can stay with them. She is also seen in episode 13, she is seen in the choir when she goes to 3 Albert Square, Teressa opens the door and she asks her if Faith, Donnie and Ava would want to join the choir.
- Jack Branning (Scott Maslen) — When Faith sees Jack in episode 1, she accuses him of eyeing her up.
- Janine Malloy (Charlie Brooks) — In episode 2, Donnie runs into Janine after stealing from a shop, causing him to fall over. She later finds him, Ava and Faith in 3 Albert Square where they are squatting, and threatens to tell the police when they start a scam.
- Kim Fox (Tameka Empson) — Donnie steals from Kim in episode 2 and she runs after him, but struggles in her shoes. When he says he thought she was the kind of person who would help someone in need, she lets him go.
- Richard Vance (Sam Phillips) – A care worker who has come from university and is described as someone who is "filled with plenty of trendy attitudes towards care. On the surface he's terrific, if occasionally a little condescending. Although he talks the talk, he thinks of the kids in care as either good or bad—and he thinks the bad ones are not worth the effort. He takes a shine to Ava when he meets her, but Richard has a sinister side to him and will go to any lengths to get what he wants..."
- Riley (Eliza Newman) – Donnie's 14-year-old sister, who has lived in care since the age of 6. She is described as someone who "knows how the care system works but she hates it. She's moved to a new care home but is getting badly bullied. She turns to Donnie for help but things don't go to plan, leaving them both in a horrifying situation..."
- Phil Mitchell (Steve McFadden)
- Anthony Moon (Matt Lapinskas) – In episode 8, Anthony is supervising Faith, Ava and Donnie while they do community service in The Queen Victoria. Anthony jokes that Ava and Donnie are a couple, which leads to Donnie attempting to attack Anthony. Phil Mitchell says it makes a change for someone to show the ladies some respect. He starts to chat Ava up but Donnie interferes once again and Anthony simply ignores him.
