= Zsa Zsa Carter =

Fictional character from EastEnders

- EastEnders character
- Portrayed by: Emer Kenny
- First appearance: Episode 3926; 5 January 2010
- Last appearance: Episode 4079; 30 September 2010
- Introduced by: Diederick Santer
- Spin-off appearances: EastEnders: E20 (2010)
In-universe information
- Occupation: Café waitress
- Father: Mark Reynolds
- Mother: Tina Carter
- Stepfather: Andy
- Grandfathers: Stan Carter
- Grandmothers: Sylvie Carter
- Aunts: Shirley Carter
- First cousins: Mick Carter; Carly Wicks; Dean Wicks; Jimbo Wicks

Zsa Zsa Carter is a fictional character from the BBC soap opera EastEnders and its internet spin-off EastEnders: E20, played by Emer Kenny. She is the daughter of Tina Carter (Luisa Bradshaw-White). She made her first appearance in EastEnders on 5 January 2010 and appears in all twelve episodes of the first series of EastEnders: E20. The character was created by a team of 13 writers aged between 17 and 22 and is described as bright, sarcastic and a rebel. In May 2010, the character's departure from the show was announced; her last appearance was on 30 September 2010. For her portrayal of Zsa Zsa, Kenny received a nomination for "Best Soap Newcomer" at the 2010 TVChoice Awards.

== Creation and development ==
"Beautiful, funky and outspoken tomboy, Zsa Zsa Carter has a lot in common with her Aunt Shirley, except for her bitterness. She's bright, but extremely stubborn. Her language can be as colourful as the streaks in her locks. The world is her playground, even if that world is just the size of Walford".

— The BBC on Zsa Zsa

Blue-haired Zsa Zsa is one of four characters created for EastEnders: E20 who also appear in EastEnders. Kenny's casting was announced on 25 November 2009. Zsa Zsa, along with the other characters from E20, was created by the show's 13 writers during a summer school run by the BBC in August 2009. Open auditions for the cast were held at Theatre Royal Stratford East but producers had trouble casting Zsa Zsa, having spent two months looking. Kenny was cast in the role whilst writing the second episode of E20. She received a phone call from her agent who told her about a character called Zsa Zsa and Kenny replied that she already knew the character well. She attended an audition and was offered the part the next day, three days before filming started. One of the executive producers of EastEnders: E20, John Yorke, said "She was so good that we suddenly went 'It's her!'" Kenny was said to be thrilled to be given the opportunity to write and act for EastEnders, describing the programme as "iconic" and adding that her part in the spin-off was exciting as it was connecting with viewers who use computers more than they watch television. To prepare for the role, Kenny had to disguise her accent, saying that Zsa Zsa's voice is "harder" than her own, which she called "posh". Director Michael Keillor advised her to spend a weekend in the East End of London, listening to different accents. The EastEnders website branded Zsa Zsa a "Beautiful, funky and outspoken tomboy".

Kenny told magazine Inside Soap that she found her first day on set intimidating because she had an argument scene with Henry, but said that she helped her feel "at ease." Along with her co-stars Sam Attwater (Leon Small) and Ricky Norwood (Fatboy), Kenny's initial contract was extended to six months, and in May 2010, along with Attwater, it was announced that she would be written out of the show, expressing a wish to pursue further acting roles. The new executive producer Bryan Kirkwood said "Emer and Sam have made a real impact in the short time they've been on the Square and we wish them all the best for the future." Her final appearance was in the episode broadcast on 30 September 2010.

Following Kenny's departure, the door has been left open for her return. Kenny commented: "All I can say is it's a very Zsa Zsa ending and it suits the character. The door is open, which is very nice - I'd absolutely consider going back. It was really emotional. It's just like leaving behind a massive family. I really miss it - but onwards and upwards". Kenny also discussed writing the second series of EastEnders: E20, saying: "I really wanted it to start with a bang. As soon as you come in it's exciting, there's sex and romance and kissing. I wanted it to be really fresh".

Although it was not planned, Zsa Zsa was given a personality similar to that of her on-screen aunt, Shirley Carter (Linda Henry), an established character in EastEnders. During the development of the character, she changed a lot and was fluid until filming started, when Kenny had a full day on set with Henry. She explained: "The words were there and I knew what she was like but when I saw Linda [Henry] speak and when I engaged with her, I realised that it was like looking in a mirror." When the character was announced, she was described as beautiful, funky, an outspoken tomboy, very bright, but likes to think she does not need anybody's help. Kenny said of the character in an interview with Soaplife magazine: "Zsa Zsa doesn't like authority or anyone who messes with her. She's a lone wolf and doesn't care about anyone." She told entertainment website Digital Spy that Zsa Zsa is "a real bitch" and "very mean and cold", while a profile for the character on the official EastEnders website says she is sarcastic, a rebel and "desperately wants the security that comes with a family but is terrified of being dependent on anyone. Her experience has taught her that adults let you down."

Kenny predicted two weeks after her first appearance on EastEnders that her on-screen mother may make an appearance in the future. Kenny replied: "Not yet, but there's definitely the possibility in the future. I'm sure she'll be in soon". Kenny also stated that her character is to be heavily involved with her on-screen aunt Shirley. She added: "The pair recognise their similarities and that brings a warmth to their relationship. At first, though, they really clash and Heather thinks that Zsa Zsa's complete trouble - which she is! Elsewhere on the Square, there's a lot of story between the other young people on the Square. Zsa Zsa definitely gets stuck in". Kenny also said about Zsa Zsa's second side: "It's quite interesting because I know when Zsa Zsa comes in, people will just hate her because she's a real bitch. That's quite intimidating because there are so many good bitches on the show - Janine being the queen of them all. Zsa Zsa's a little different in the way she looks and talks, though. So we've definitely tried to make her different".

== Storylines ==
Zsa Zsa arrives in the show's setting of Albert Square, jumping the barriers at the tube station. She sees Whitney Dean (Shona McGarty) selling T-shirts and makes up a story about her boyfriend dying in a car crash in order to distract Whitney so she can shoplift. She then heads to the café where she overhears Lauren Branning (Madeline Duggan) breaking up with Peter Beale (Thomas Law), and she talks to Peter outside. Peter's sister Lucy Beale (Melissa Suffield) decides to hold a party at 89b George Street, and Peter invites Zsa Zsa. She then asks Peter who lives there, and he says nobody does. They dance together and end up kissing. Lauren walks in and slaps Peter and Zsa Zsa, who fights with Lauren. Whitney intervenes, but ends up getting in the fight herself, and Zsa Zsa ends up with a cut on her forehead. When Lucy orders her out, Zsa Zsa throws punch over Lauren, Lucy and Whitney. Outside, she asks Peter if he knows Shirley Carter (Linda Henry), saying they go back a long way. Zsa Zsa visits Shirley and they talk. She is about to explain her reasons for being there when Phil Mitchell (Steve McFadden) comes in, and Shirley asks her to leave. Outside, Peter is waiting for Zsa Zsa. She goes to the bus stop and Peter wonders if he will see her again. She walks over to him and kisses him passionately, and says "maybe", taking his keys without him knowing.

Zsa Zsa's story continues in EastEnders: E20, where she runs from her stepfather, Andy (Steve North). He assumes she is in 89b George Street, where Shirley used to live, and dumps her bags outside. When he sees her, he runs after her but she is rescued by Leon Small (Sam Attwater). She runs off again and Leon, along with Fatboy (Ricky Norwood) and Mercy Olubunmi (Bunmi Mojekwu), finds her and she picks up her bags. Andy's car appears and they run into the flat with Peter's key. Andy leaves and they decide to stay in the flat. It is revealed that Zsa Zsa's father is dead and her mother Tina Carter (Luisa Bradshaw-White) has gone to Spain with a man named Miguel. She and Leon grow close, leading to them having sex in a cemetery. Fatboy tells Zsa Zsa that Leon is the father of Mercy's unborn baby, though it is untrue, and Zsa Zsa starts throwing everyone's belongings out of the window. Mercy suffers a miscarriage and Zsa Zsa freaks out and decides to leave. Leon stops her, saying he has feelings for her. He invites her to his boxing match, saying if she is there, he will know how she really feels. She turns up too late and misses the match, but when they meet up they kiss. Knowing they can no longer stay in the flat, Fatboy offers them a room at his house.

Several weeks later, she runs away from Fatboy's house without warning, returning to Walford and spending the night at Shirley's flat. Leon and Fatboy track her down and she apologises for disappearing. Shirley decides to let her stay with her for a while, and attempts to get Zsa Zsa into a local school. This fails, so she asks Phil for a favour, and he speaks to the headmaster Mr Allcock (Bill Buckhurst). Shirley tells Zsa Zsa she has an appointment with Mr Allcock but she is not interested until she sees him and takes a liking to him. She befriends Whitney and gives her relationship advice. Mr Allcock visits and Zsa Zsa flirts with him, but she gets a place in the school due to Phil's intervention. Zsa Zsa receives a letter from her mother asking her to join her in Spain, but she does not want to go, so tries to prove she is useful by babysitting Shirley's housemate Heather Trott's (Cheryl Fergison) baby George and saying it is a shame after Shirley went to all the trouble to get her into school. Shirley acts like she does not care if Zsa Zsa stays or goes but after she tears up Tina's letter, she lets on to Heather that she would have missed Zsa Zsa.

Zsa Zsa and Leon start a proper relationship, and she starts working on Whitney's market stall. She starts receiving gifts from an unknown person, calling themselves "The Blue Masquerader". They eventually discover the gifts are from Peter. Lucy attempts to help Peter break up Leon and Zsa Zsa, but after he changes his mind, she reveals to Zsa Zsa that Leon got her pregnant, causing Zsa Zsa to end the relationship. After a while, Fatboy attempts to reunite the couple as Leon has not been himself since. The couple nearly reunite, until Leon kisses Whitney without permission. Zsa Zsa travels to Hampshire with Leon, Fatboy, Lucy and Whitney and plans with Lucy to get revenge on Leon, though the plan fails when Lucy tells Leon about it and he runs off into the woods. The next day Leon is missing and she does not believe Lucy when she says Leon went out early because he left his wallet behind. She demands to know why Lucy lied so Lucy leaves. They search for Leon and find his mobile phone with blood on it, leading them to believe that Peter hit him with Fatboy's van the night before. However, he turns up having been in police custody overnight. Upon their return to Walford, Leon attempts to make amends with Zsa Zsa but she says she preferred it when she thought he was dead.

Zsa Zsa and her friends uncover the body of Owen Turner (Lee Ross) in Albert Square's gardens, and are horrified. The next day, Zsa Zsa makes a joke when Leon speaks after saying nothing all day, and he leaves. She finds him and apologises, and comforts him as she did not realise how badly he was affected. He then tells her about when his mother died in a car crash. Phil ejects Zsa Zsa and Shirley from their home, incorrectly claiming that Shirley has conspired with his mother Peggy Mitchell (Barbara Windsor) against him, leaving them homeless. They move in with Heather, but the landlord fails to make mortgage payments, meaning bailiffs turn up to take the house. They agree to squat but Shirley leaves the house, meaning they cannot return there. Zsa Zsa tells Shirley she is useless and would rather live in the gutter. She then asks Mercy if she can stay with her, and starts working in the café. Zsa Zsa later accidentally reveals that Lucy's miscarriage was actually an abortion to Jane, when she misunderstands Jane being upset over Lucy being dishonest about cheating to gain her grades.

Leon obtains two tickets to a music festival in France and chooses to take Zsa Zsa with him. However, Zsa Zsa finds out from Mercy that Leon slept with Glenda Mitchell (Glynis Barber). She lies to him that she slept with someone else a few months ago to see if he will confess, but he says he has not been with anyone else. Later, she seduces him in Fatboy's van but throws him out in his underwear, humiliating him. She says goodbye to Shirley and leaves Walford for France in the van.

== Other appearances ==
Zsa Zsa also appears in extra content on the official EastEnders: E20 website. The first is a video of her writing a text message to her mother, in which she says goodbye and that she is sick of trying to mend their relationship. However, she saves the message without sending it. Another video shows Leon filming Zsa Zsa as they mess around with their camera phones, ending with a kiss. Zsa Zsa also makes a cameo appearance in series 2 of EastEnders: E20. In the first episode, she insults Naz Mehmet (Emaa Hussen), who insults her back, before stealing some of Fatboy's money and running away.

== Reception ==
During her stint on EastEnders: E20, Zsa Zsa was called an "impressive" character by Tony Stewart of the Daily Mirror. A writer for The Northern Echo wondered if Zsa Zsa, along with Leon and Fatboy, brought a new injection of life into EastEnders or took away screen time from more established characters, Zsa Zsa was featured in Inside Soap's "Next Big Thing" feature in 2010, where they name the new stars of British soaps that they believe "will set the world of soap alight in the year ahead" but after her departure they branded her one of 2010's departed characters that would not be remembered. In May 2010, Kenny received a nomination in the "Best Soap Newcomer" category at the 14th TVChoice Awards for her portrayal of Zsa Zsa.

== See also ==
- List of EastEnders: E20 characters
