= Sol Levi =

Fictional character in EastEnders: E20

- EastEnders: E20 character
- Portrayed by: Tosin Cole
- First appearance: Series 2, episode 1
- Last appearance: Series 3, episode 1
- Created by: EastEnders: E20 writers team
In-universe information
- Occupation: Student (on suspension)
- Mother: Caroline Levi
- Brothers: Asher Levi

Solomon "Sol" Levi is a fictional character from EastEnders: E20, an Internet spin-off of the BBC soap opera EastEnders, played by Tosin Cole. Sol is a main character in series 2, where he is joined by his older brother Asher Levi (Heshima Thompson) and their new friends Naz Mehmet (Emaa Hussen) and Stevie Dickinson (Amanda Fairbank-Hynes). Sol is described as loyal, shy, thoughtful and reserved. He is dependent on his brother, who has looked after him for most of this life. Throughout the series, he has a romance with Naz but it is threatened by his bad temper, falls out but later reunites with his brother, and performs a solo dance routine in the finale.

== Storylines ==
Sol arrives in Walford with his brother Asher Levi (Heshima Thompson) after their mother Caroline (Sandra Yaw) throws them out of their home. Sol helps Naz Mehmet (Emaa Hussen) in an argument with Fatboy (Ricky Norwood) and is punched in the face by Leon Small (Sam Attwater). Sol and Asher attend a dance audition for Skolla (Tony Adigun) but Sol messes up. They then move into Stevie Dickinson's (Amanda Fairbank-Hynes) flat with Naz. They attend a party where several people ask Sol for drugs, leaving him annoyed. Naz sells them fake drugs, but when they complain, Sol gives their money back and they leave. Back in Walford, Naz kisses Sol to avoid being seen by Ekin Beg (Hemi Yeroham). Sol and Naz grow closer when she watches him do his dance routine, and they almost kiss twice but are interrupted both times, the second time by the arrival of Ekin who reveals he and Naz are engaged. Sol then argues with Naz about Ekin. He and Asher attend callbacks for the dance group but Skolla says Sol is too slow and gets him to perform solo, but Sol is put off but the audience and leaves. Asher later tells him he is a better dancer and the dance crew is their future, but Sol says it is Asher's dream and he just wants to go home to his mother. After Asher tells Ekin to back off from Naz, Ekin asks Sol to tell Asher he is not Naz's boyfriend, leading Sol to believe that Naz and Asher are seeing each other. Sol insults Naz and Asher who leave and go clubbing. Sol sends an apology via text message, and Stevie encourages him to find her. When he does, she is drunk. They reconcile but he is unaware that Naz and Asher have had sex.

Sol and Naz spend the night together but at later dance rehearsals, Asher gives Naz her necklace back, and Sol sees this. He confronts Naz about it and she reveals she had a one-night stand with Asher but it meant nothing to her. Sol punches Asher, saying his brother has betrayed him, and a fight breaks out, but is broken up by Skolla and the other dancers. Skolla tells Sol and Asher they are both out of the group and reveals that Asher bought Sol's place. Sol goes back home to his mother but a neighbour tells him she has been taken away. Back in Walford, Naz insists she did not receive Sol's text message but he is still angry. Stevie attempts to get them to reconcile by locking them in the flat and pretending to swallow the key, but Naz reveals she is going to Turkey to meet Ekin's family and Sol says she can stay there. Sol and Naz get close again but Asher interrupts them when he returns drunk. Stevie drops the key revealing she did not swallow it and Sol thinks Naz was in on the plan so he tells her to enjoy Turkey before leaving. Asher finds Sol with their mother in hospital, and tells Sol he is better off with him than their mother as she is schizophrenic and has stabbed Asher. Sol says Asher is the problem and leaves. Asher finds him and apologises for Naz and says she did not get Sol's text message because he deleted it, and tells Sol that Naz loves him and he should do something about it. Sol returns to Walford again as Naz is leaving, and stops Ekin's car. Naz gets out and they kiss. Asher tells him he can dance at the dance-off, but when his name is called, he is unsure and calls for Asher, saying he needs him. Asher tells him he can do it on his own. Everyone cheers him after his routine and he is called one of the best dancers.

In series 3, Naz and Sol are seen briefly together, and they are still a couple.

== Creation, development and characterisation ==
Sol is one of four main characters from series two of EastEnders: E20, created by its team of thirteen writers, along with Asher, Stevie and Naz. Tosin Cole was cast in the role, and said, "It's a privilege to work on something so big but so different. Everyone is fantastic to work with. I'm really excited." He said that he found it exciting and weird to work with the EastEnders cast, but they made him feel comfortable. However, he admitted to feeling nervous about having to dance in front of professional dance group Flawless in the series finale, saying that learning to dance was "very, very, very stressful." The character and casting were announced on 28 July 2010. The show's producer, Deborah Sathe, said "I am [...] proud of what the writers have achieved. [They] have created four new faces for [Albert] Square and their reaction to Walford life is really exciting."

Sol is Asher's younger brother, and Asher has provided for him most of his life. Asher has been a father figure to Sol since a young age, and Sol depends on him. Looking after Sol takes a toll on Asher, however. Sol is loyal to his brother, but depends on him so much that he finds it difficult to function without him. Sol likes his family to be together, but they are fractured due to Asher being a troublemaker and their mother being mentally unstable and Sol wants to reunite them. Sol's dependence on Asher also means he finds it difficult to establish his own identity. Asher is willing to put himself out to secure Sol's success, such as being stabbed by his mother and giving away his father's Rolex watch so Sol can get a place in the dance group, and has done things so that Sol would not have to do them himself. Thompson opined that Asher is not necessarily the best role model for Sol, but is a good brother even though the mistakes he makes override the good things he has done for Sol. Cole said that Sol is not a troublemaker but he gets into trouble without meaning to as trouble comes to him. Although he does not bring attention to himself, he has a bad temper and hides his feelings with violence. He gets into a few fights throughout the series, and makes situations worse by getting physical. Sol does not understand or think about what he is doing when he loses his temper. Cole also said that trust is an issue with Sol throughout the series.

Sol quickly falls for Naz when they meet, but his anger threatens their relationship. Sol has never met a girl like Naz before, and Cole said Naz probably has not met boys like Sol before either. Hussen said that there is something about Sol that attracts Naz. She is stronger than he is so Naz likes to take him in and teach him things. Cole explained that Sol is attracted to Naz because she is different from other girls and they are complete opposites. and Sol depends on him. Looking after Sol takes a toll on Asher, however. One of Cole's first scenes to film was a kiss between Sol and Naz. Cole found it tough and awkward as the actors had only just met, and would have preferred it to be filmed later on, but said that the scene was awkward anyway so he did not have to act much for it. Sol has also been described as shy, caring, sweet, thoughtful, soft, easily hurt and reserved.

== Other appearances ==
Sol also appears in extra video content on the E20 website. In one, he and Asher argue during filming of an advert for "SmasherDance", as Sol is more interested in getting food. The full SmasherDance advert is also on YouTube. In another video, the four friends play a drinking game in the café but Sol loses and ends up being sick from too much drink. In another video he calls his mother and leaves a message saying he misses her and is worried about her.

== See also ==
- List of EastEnders: E20 characters
