= Mercy Olubunmi =

Fictional character from the British soap opera EastEnders

- EastEnders character
- Portrayed by: Bunmi Mojekwu
- Duration: 2010–2011
- First appearance: Episode 4009/4010; 31 May 2010
- Last appearance: Episode 4246; 12 July 2011
- Created by: EastEnders: E20 series 1 writing team
- Introduced by: Diederick Santer
- Spin-off appearances: EastEnders: E20 (2010)
In-universe information
- Other names: Mercy Chubb (married name)
- Occupation: Student
- Sisters: Faith Olubunmi
- Husband: Fatboy (2011)
- Grandmothers: Grace Olubunmi

Mercy Olubunmi (also Chubb) is a fictional character from the BBC soap opera EastEnders and its Internet spin-off EastEnders: E20, played by Bunmi Mojekwu. Mercy is one of four main characters in EastEnders: E20, alongside Zsa Zsa Carter (Emer Kenny), Leon Small (Sam Attwater) and Fatboy (Ricky Norwood). She was the only character from the spin-off not to be automatically transitioned into EastEnders. It was subsequently announced that she would join EastEnders due to positive reaction to the character, and made her first appearance in the soap on 31 May 2010. In May 2011, it was announced that Mercy was to leave EastEnders and she departed on 12 July 2011.

== Development ==
Mercy is one of four characters created by a team of 13 writers aged between 17 and 22 for the Internet spin-off series EastEnders: E20. The characters were created in August 2009 and open auditions were held for the cast at Theatre Royal Stratford East. Mojekwu's casting was announced on 25 November 2009, on which she commented: "I feel so blessed to be part of EastEnders: E20. My first day on set was just crazy. I was on Albert Square—a dream come true—I'm enjoying every second." When Mojekwu was asked in an interview with media website Digital Spy how she felt about being the only main cast member from EastEnders: E20 not appearing in EastEnders, she said: "If I was meant to go into the main show, then I would have done. Obviously I'd have loved to but for someone like my character, it'll be the support of the viewers that decide[s] her fate. I don't feel upset or anything, I just thought that it's the way these things go." It was announced on 24 January 2010 that Mercy would appear in EastEnders later in 2010. Executive producer Diederick Santer said that once he had seen the completed episodes of EastEnders: E20, he wanted Mercy in the main show as well, and stated: "Mercy's also been a huge hit with E20 viewers—she's funny, warm, sensitive and rather mysterious. [...] I'm delighted Bunmi will be bringing those qualities to the wider EastEnders audience." Mercy and her grandmother Grace's introduction to EastEnders made them the first Nigerian family to appear in the series. Mojekwu was surprised at how long it took the programme to represent her community in the series, but congratulated them for doing so, saying "they have a long way to go in representing us." Mercy's younger sister Faith Olubunmi was introduced in series 3 of E20.

The character is described as having "always been a good girl, but when her parents head back to Nigeria she feels abandoned." Mojekwu described the character as "very strong-willed and bound within her faith. Her best attribute is that she's very motherly and takes people under her wing to look after them. Her worst is that she takes the world on her shoulders and you just want to tell her, 'You don't have to worry about [that], you can't deal with it alone'. Mercy takes too much on." The character often wears a yellow jacket and has a red hair weave, which Mojekwu said, "didn't look too great".

In April 2011, Mercy faces deportation to Nigeria, and Fatboy plans to save her by proposing. Norwood revealed that Mercy is shocked by the proposal, adding "Mercy thinks he's lost his marbles, but soon comes round to the idea. Fatboy reckons that this isn't about his feelings, it's all about keeping her in the UK. Of course, he's also hoping that if she stays, maybe she'll end up liking him in the way he likes her. [...] You can get into a lot of trouble for [trying to fool immigration officials], [b]ut all Fatboy can think is, 'How can I save Mercy?' She's the girl he loves."

On 10 May 2011, it was announced that Mojekwu would be departing EastEnders in July 2011. An EastEnders spokesperson said "Bunmi has done a great job of bringing the role of Mercy to life and we wish her every success in the future." In an interview with The Stage it was revealed that Mercy's family will remain in the series. Mojekwu told The Stage that she felt she was leaving at the right time, as she did not want to spend too much time in a soap opera and hoped to gain recognition and to be able to take on more challenging roles in the future.

== Storylines ==
=== EastEnders: E20 ===
In series 1 of EastEnders: E20, Mercy, who is friends with Fatboy, is trying to create a project for the local church with the youth minister Benjamin (Damien Lynch), to attempt to bring younger people to the church, and if it is successful, Mercy's grandmother (played by Jay Byrd), will fund her university place. She enlists Fatboy's help but his ideas leave them humiliated. Mercy, along with the others, ends up squatting in 89b George Street, where she takes a pregnancy test and then tells her grandmother she will not be coming home. She goes to a clinic to discuss abortion, and later tells Fatboy she is pregnant. It is soon revealed that Benjamin, who is married to Celia (Marsha Henry) is the father, but Fatboy accuses Leon of being the father, and after an argument, Mercy doubles over in pain and is rushed to hospital. She suffers a miscarriage and Benjamin tells her it was probably for the best. Back at home, Fatboy looks after her. She attends Leon's boxing match where Fatboy gives her the completed project. Knowing they can no longer stay at the flat, Fatboy invites her and the others back to his house but she decides to return home to her grandmother.

Mercy makes a cameo appearance in series 2 of EastEnders: E20 when she witnesses an argument between Fatboy and Naz Mehmet (Emaa Hussen) that Zsa Zsa also gets involved in.

=== EastEnders ===
Several months after the events of E20's first series, Mercy attempts to contact Fatboy as she has returned to Walford following a visit to her parents in Nigeria. She finds out he is at a party in Hampshire so she travels there with Billie Jackson (Devon Anderson). Mercy and Fatboy are extremely pleased to see each other but when a fight breaks out, they escape into Fatboy's van. Mercy then returns to Walford with her friends. Mercy's grandmother Grace Olubunmi (now played by Ellen Thomas) arrives in Walford and urges Mercy to tell Fatboy of their plans to return to Lagos permanently, however, when Mercy cannot find the right moment, Grace tells him. Fatboy soon realises that neither Mercy nor Grace want to leave London, and after Mercy hands in the keys to their home, he gets them to meet and helps them to realise it for themselves. They move into a property on Albert Square.

After an argument between Mercy and Fatboy, she pushes him and he falls onto a tree planted in memory of Trina Johnson (Sharon Duncan-Brewster), breaking it. Worried that Trina's ex-husband Lucas Johnson (Don Gilet) will be angry with them, they enlist Leon and Zsa Zsa's help to replace the tree. However, as they dig up the tree, they discover the body of Owen Turner (Lee Ross) buried beneath it. The next day, Fatboy comforts Mercy when she says it is all she can see when she closes her eyes. She attends Lucas's Bible class and questions him about false prophets and a passage that states that anyone who questions a priest should be put to death, causing Lucas to make an excuse to leave because he cannot answer her. Grace asks Mercy to write a letter of apology to Lucas, but Mercy throws it away. Mercy and Fatboy play rounders but smash Dot Branning's (June Brown) window, which Fatboy repairs. Mercy asks Dot if she can attend her church. When Zsa Zsa is left homeless, she asks to move in with Mercy and her grandmother.

Leon breaks one of Grace's commemorative plates, but Mercy gets the blame. However, Fatboy later admits it was his fault. When Alfie Moon (Shane Richie) sets up a drinking den in the cellar of The Queen Victoria public house, which is closed due to being burnt down, Mercy and her friends attend, and Alfie gets Mercy to serve drinks while he is not there. Later, Grace tells Mercy she cannot work in an illegal drinking establishment and says Fatboy corrupted her. Mercy then tells Zsa Zsa that she cannot go to France with Leon, as he slept with Glenda Mitchell (Glynis Barber). Zsa Zsa and Leon both leave, but separately, leaving Mercy and Fatboy upset at the loss of their friends.

At a New Year's Eve party, Mercy kisses Fatboy to put Kim Fox (Tameka Empson) off flirting with him. As the party continues, Fatboy cuts his finger and Kim starts to crawl along the bar offering to kiss him. Enraged by this, Mercy walks over and pushes Kim off the bar onto the floor below. She takes a liking to Seb Parker (Tommy Bastow), which leaves Fatboy jealous, and later he accuses them of having sex, to which Mercy does not reply. She then reveals she may face deportation as she only has a Nigerian passport and her visa has expired but she has lived in the United Kingdom since the age of nine. When Fatboy mentions this to his father Ashley Chubb (Colin Mace), Ashley reports Mercy to the UK Border Agency. Seb ends his relationship with Mercy, and then she is approached by Daniel Mansard (Richard Galazka) from the Agency, saying she is four months past her permit. She decides to leave the country before she has been asked to and says an emotional goodbye to Fatboy, but as he sees her saying goodbye to Grace and leaving in a taxi, he stops the car and asks Mercy to marry him. Mercy agrees in the hope she will stay in the country. Mercy confides in her friend Lauren Branning (Jacqueline Jossa) that the wedding is a sham. She later says she is worried about going to court as she feels she is being treated like a criminal. On the morning of the wedding, Mercy feels guilty when everyone comments on how much she loves Fatboy. She tells Lauren that she wants to do the right thing, and there will be no wedding. However, they do marry, and Mercy soon learns that she is able to stay in the country. However, she feels guilty about what has happened and decides to go to Nigeria anyway. She tries to tell Fatboy but eventually decides to leave without telling him. However, he finds out and tries to stop her. They say an emotional farewell before she leaves in a black cab. Mercy's younger sister Faith (Modupe Adeyeye) later arrives in Walford to tell Fatboy that Mercy has had the marriage annulled.

== Reception ==
In October 2011, Mojekwu was nominated in the Young Shooting Star (16–23) category at the Screen Nation Awards for her performance as Mercy, which celebrate the best British Black talent.
