= Stevie Dickinson =

Fictional character in EastEnders: E20

- EastEnders: E20 character
- Portrayed by: Amanda Fairbank-Hynes
- Appears in: Series 2
- Created by: EastEnders: E20 writers team
In-universe information
- Occupation: Student
- Brothers: Rupert Dickinson

Stevie Dickinson is a fictional character from EastEnders: E20, an Internet spin-off of the BBC soap opera EastEnders, played by Amanda Fairbank-Hynes. Stevie is a main character in series 2, where she is joined by her new friends Asher Levi (Heshima Thompson), Sol Levi (Tosin Cole) and Naz Mehmet (Emaa Hussen). Stevie is described as posh, naive, kind, forward, creative and a daydreamer. She has a complicated relationship with her boyfriend Olly Manthrope-Hall (Joshua McGuire), and throughout the series, she falls for Masood Ahmed (Nitin Ganatra), has an encounter with Pippa (Roxanne McKee) and gets revenge on Olly.

== Storylines ==
After making love in their flat, Stevie's boyfriend Olly Manthrope-Hall (Joshua McGuire) ends his relationship with Stevie and moves out. He leaves her in the middle of Albert Square with some flyers he printed so she can find a new flatmate. Asher Levi (Heshima Thompson) sees the flyers and helps Stevie up. She invites him back to her flat, and asks him to move in. When Asher returns later, he has his brother Sol (Tosin Cole) and new friend Naz Mehmet (Emaa Hussen) with him, and Stevie says she does not mind them staying, so they all become friends. Olly warns Stevie not to attend a party later but Naz says they should go anyway, and on the way there, Stevie meets Masood Ahmed (Nitin Ganatra), but assumes he is a suicide bomber. At the party, Asher poses as Stevie's new boyfriend to make Olly jealous. She gets drunk and badmouths Olly to a girl called Pippa (Roxanne McKee) but Pippa introduces Olly as her own boyfriend, so Stevie insults her, resulting in Pippa pushing Stevie. The four friends leave and Stevie meets Masood again and he offers her his coat because she is cold. Feeling humiliated by photos that have been posted on the internet from the party, Stevie worries her only chance to win Olly back has been ruined. She tells Naz she had an erotic dream about Masood and develops a crush on him. She tries to get work with Masood by flirting but is left embarrassed. She returns after being given tips from Naz, and Masood tells her they are short staffed and to come back the next day. Stevie thinks her flirting was successful so goes over the top and flashes her bra, so Naz ushers her away.

On Stevie's birthday, Naz arranges a dinner party for Stevie. Stevie's mother calls, asking her to carry out an errand but not mentioning her birthday. Naz sees a birthday card from when Stevie was thirteen and Stevie says it is the last card she received from her family. Naz tells her to forget her family. When Sol falls out with both Naz and Asher, Stevie tries to help resolve the problems. She and Sol go to a club where Stevie bumps into Pippa and they are more friendly. The next day, they wake up in bed together and Stevie tries to hide Pippa from her housemates. Olly bursts in saying he will have to let the flat go as he needs his deposit, but Stevie asks for one more day. Pippa writes Stevie a cheque to cover it, says she is one of the sexiest girls she has ever met, and asks her to call her, before leaving. Stevie gives Olly the deposit but he reveals he has already given notice and Stevie will have to move out the next day. Stevie visits her brother Rupert's grave before returning to the flat and making a list of safety violations. When her landlady Roxy Mitchell (Rita Simons) arrives, Stevie begs to stay, and says she will contact the council about the violations, so Roxy agrees. Stevie then invites Olly over, and he hopes to rekindle their relationship. However, she ties him naked to a chair, then humiliates him by making him walk home in a dress. She tells Masood they will have tea one day and kisses him before running off. The friends then all reunite and Stevie remarks that she loves a happy ending, saying they are now a happy family.

== Creation, development and characterisation ==
Stevie is one of four main characters from series two of EastEnders: E20, created by its team of thirteen writers. Amanda Fairbank-Hynes was cast in the role, on which she stated, "It all happened so quickly but I'm really excited to be working on EastEnders. It's an amazing group of people and they are great to work with." Fairbank-Hynes attended five auditions for the part, and she found out she got the part two days before filming started. She stated that she was pleased when she found out as attending that many auditions—the most she had auditioned for any part—made her want the part more. The character was still being written and changed a lot during the audition process. The character and casting were announced on 28 July 2010. The show's producer, Deborah Sathe, said "I am [...] proud of what the writers have achieved. [They] have created four new faces for [Albert] Square and their reaction to Walford life is really exciting."

Stevie is the privately educated daughter of rich parents, who have abandoned her to go travelling. She is said to be clueless about real life, with her profile on the official E20 website describing her as generous, creative and unlucky in love, though she has a boyfriend. Although she is described as posh, Fairbank-Hynes said Stevie is not just like a posh girl in East London, but would be out of place anywhere as she is in her own world. Fairbank-Hynes opined that posh characters in Walford stand out and can bring comedy to the show. Stevie is very naive and, according to Fairbank-Hynes, "away with the fairies"—the most naive person anyone could meet. However, writer Emer Kenny was worried that Stevie being "away with the fairies" would make her unrealistic, but said that Fairbank-Hynes made the character recognisable. Because of Stevie's naivety and her kind nature, people see this as an invitation to take advantage of her. Stevie does not understand why people are cruel to her because she sees the good in them and wants to look after them, be around people and mother them. Fairbank-Hynes commented, "Stevie's the type of person who thinks a stranger is a friend she hasn't met yet". However, Stevie is very forward, which can scare people away. She is also creative, empathetic and a complete daydreamer who lacks common sense but has bursts of assertiveness and intelligence, which can surprise people. Thompson said that Stevie has a good balance as she can be ditzy but also quite smart. Fairbank-Hynes identified with the character's mad outbursts, innocence and daydreaming, and also said Stevie is quirky, lovely and eccentric. Her daydreaming can lead people to believe she is a bimbo, but she is not.

Stevie's relationship with Olly is complicated and he treats her badly, but she ignores his flaws and holds onto any nice thing he does, however small. When he ends their relationship, Stevie is heartbroken, alone and lost, and does not fit in. She invites Asher to stay and is surprised when he brings Sol and Naz as well, but because Stevie loves to make new friends, she reacts in a way most people would not in that situation. She builds relationships with them and they grow to love her eventually. Fairbank-Hynes commented: "Sol, Naz and Asher inform her about the real world and help her harden up just enough to survive in Albert Square!" Stevie starts to see her new friends as the family she always wanted, but it proves to be difficult as they all have family issues of their own. Stevie wants to look after her new friends, which confuses them. The actress described the four friends as an unlikely gang, and said her favourite scenes were when Stevie and Sol caused a blackout across Albert Square, as the two characters did not have much interaction before then. Thompson described Stevie as a "fish out of water", and Hussen said Stevie starts off being unappreciated, but eventually her friends see that she is important to them.

Stevie falls for Masood quite early on and it plays out through the whole series. She believes she has met the man of her dreams, but her feelings are not reciprocated because of the way she is. Fairbank-Hynes said the storyline is interesting and funny. Stevie also sees Pippa as "the cold-hearted 'other woman'" who has stolen her boyfriend, but later discovers that she is "actually human too and not some evil goddess whose sole intention is to steal boyfriends!" McKee said that Pippa's role in the series is the drive Stevie's story forward and help her find her identity. In an interview with Last Broadcast the actress said that over the course of the series, Stevie becomes more streetwise and a better judge of character.

== Other appearances ==
Stevie is one of four characters who has an official profile on social networking site Twitter, where it is revealed that the character is living in Albert Square before the series starts, staying with her boyfriend Olly. Further posts show that he went out on their anniversary and she hoped to make the relationship work but he hinted that he would end it. Stevie also appears in additional video content on the official E20 website. In the first video, she performs a rap about Olly on the tube after leaving the party in episode 2. In another, Stevie and Naz have a picnic in the park, and Naz makes a video of Stevie, hoping to make Olly jealous, but Stevie ends up with cake on her face. The four friends play a drinking game in the café in another video, and another scene features Stevie and Naz talking about kissing.

== See also ==
- List of EastEnders: E20 characters
