= SC-9 =

SC-9, or variants, may refer to:

- (181711) 1993 SC9 (SC9 of 1993), an asteroid
- SC09, a FIPS 10-4 region code
- SC-09, a subdivision code for the Seychelles, see ISO 3166-2:SC
- Shorts S.C.9, a variation of the English Electric Canberra bomber
- South Carolina Highway 9
- South Carolina's 9th congressional district
- Southern Cross Nine, an Australian television network
- Spooks: Code 9, a British television series
