= Leon Small =

UK soap opera character, created 2010

- EastEnders character
- Portrayed by: Sam Attwater
- First appearance: Episode 3926; 5 January 2010
- Last appearance: Episode 4079; 30 September 2010
- Created by: EastEnders: E20 series 1 writing team
- Introduced by: Diederick Santer
- Spin-off appearances: EastEnders: E20 (2010)
In-universe information
- Occupation: Student
- Father: Malcolm Small

Leon Small is a fictional character from the BBC soap opera EastEnders and its Internet spin-off EastEnders: E20, played by Sam Attwater. He made his first appearance in EastEnders on 5 January and appears in all twelve episodes of the first series of EastEnders: E20. The character was created by a team of 13 writers aged between 17 and 22 and is described as sexy and cool with a short fuse and a lack of respect for those in authority. The character's departure was announced on 11 May 2010 and his last appearance was on 30 September 2010.

== Development ==
Leon is one of four characters created for the first series of EastEnders: E20 who also appear in EastEnders. Along with the other characters from E20, he was created by the show's 13 writers during a summer school run by the BBC in August 2009. Open auditions for the cast were held at Theatre Royal Stratford East, and Attwater's casting was announced on 25 November 2009, on which he said "It is a great privilege to be working with such great actors and on such an established show. It's an amazing opportunity and I'm really enjoying tackling a character like Leon who has so much going on!" The first scene Attwater filmed was of him in his underwear, the first of six semi-naked scenes that were filmed for EastEnders: E20. Attwater said he felt pressure to be in shape for the part and prepared by attending a gym, saying "I want to be on the best form." Leon is also a dedicated boxer, but Attwater had never boxed before. His boxing scenes in EastEnders: E20 were filmed with a stuntman who Attwater was allowed to hit as much as was necessary.

Leon is described as sexy, effortlessly cool, with a short fuse and a lack of respect for those in authority. His mother died when he was a child and he was left in charge of his alcoholic father. In an interview with entertainment website Digital Spy, Attwater said the character is strong-minded, going on to say: "He's a boxer, he wins in the ring and he has a way with the ladies. He can talk most into bed! That's his strong attribute! Leon's mum died when he was young, and that was a big thing for him. His relationship with his father's quite rocky, so I think that's where his weakness lies, in his family life. He tries to push that away as much as possible." He said that during EastEnders: E20, "[y]ou see his strengths and weaknesses and by the end of it, he becomes quite a rounded character, which is taken on into the main series."

Along with his co-stars Emer Kenny and Ricky Norwood, Attwater's initial contract was extended to six months, and he hoped for it to be extended further, however, on 11 May 2010, his departure from the show was announced, along with that of Kenny, who played Leon's girlfriend Zsa Zsa Carter. The new executive producer of EastEnders, Bryan Kirkwood, said "Emer and Sam have made a real impact in the short time they've been on the Square and we wish them all the best for the future."

== Storylines ==
Leon arrives in the show's setting of Albert Square as a new student at Walford High School, and Peter Beale (Thomas Law) is to be his "buddy". Peter's twin sister Lucy (Melissa Suffield) takes a liking to Leon and holds a party in 89b George Street so she can spend time with him. The party turns to chaos and Lucy and Leon get everyone out by saying the police are outside. Leon offers to help Lucy clean up and asks her to join in a game of Twister with him. As they are playing, a condom falls out Lucy's pocket. Leon sees it and says he did not want to take advantage of her. However, she kisses him passionately, which leads to sex. After they have sex, Leon receives a text message and gets dressed but asks if Lucy wants to do it again. Lucy says yes, but after appears disturbed.

In EastEnders: E20, Leon and Lucy go back to the flat but are disturbed by Zsa Zsa Carter's (Emer Kenny) stepfather Andy who thinks she is inside. Lucy tells Andy where Zsa Zsa is, but Leon defends Zsa Zsa and Lucy leaves. He finds Andy attacking Zsa Zsa and fights him off. He then meets Fatboy (Ricky Norwood) and Mercy Olubunmi (Bunmi Mojekwu) and along with Zsa Zsa, they run from Andy into 89b George Street where they decide to stay. Leon tells Fatboy his mother is dead and his father has kicked him out. Leon and Zsa Zsa grow close, leading to them having sex in a cemetery. He begins to get frustrated with Zsa Zsa and grows closer to Mercy, and Fatboy accuses Leon of being the father of Mercy's unborn baby, though it is not true. Mercy suffers a miscarriage and Zsa Zsa freaks out and decides to leave. Leon stops her, saying he has feelings for her. He invites her to his boxing match, saying if she is there, he will know how she really feels. Leon wins the match but Zsa Zsa is not there. When they finally meet up they kiss, and knowing they can no longer stay in the flat, Fatboy offers them a room at his house.

Having started a proper relationship with Zsa Zsa, Leon returns to Walford looking for her after she runs away. He performs as a stripper at Bianca Jackson's (Patsy Palmer) hen party. After the party, Zainab Masood (Nina Wadia) catches him in bed with Lucy. Lucy tries to break Leon and Zsa Zsa up when they are kissing in The Queen Victoria public house, managing to drag Leon back to her house until her father Ian Beale (Adam Woodyatt) interrupts them and asks Leon to leave. Lucy watches Leon and Zsa Zsa around Albert Square and reveals to her stepmother Jane (Laurie Brett) that she is pregnant. Leon humiliates Whitney Dean (Shona McGarty) by filming her cleaning a bench in the Square and sending it to people, so when she hears Ian talking about the pregnancy, she decides to tell Leon. He confronts Lucy in The Queen Vic and asks if the baby is his. They meet the next day and he says he is willing to go with her to get an abortion, but she lies that the baby is not his. When Leon demands the truth, Lucy tells him she had an abortion.

Zsa Zsa receives gifts from someone calling themselves "The Blue Masquerader" and Leon grows jealous. Leon and Fatboy eventually discover that Peter has been sending the gifts. Lucy helps Peter to split up Leon and Zsa Zsa but after Peter changes his mind, Lucy reveals to Zsa Zsa that Leon got her pregnant. Zsa Zsa breaks up with Leon and his attempts to win her back fail. Leon moves back in with his father but moves out again when he beats Leon after finding out he got Lucy pregnant. Leon tells Fatboy he is staying with someone but later sneaks back into 89b George Street. He helps Whitney with her T-shirt printing and flirts with her and kisses her, but she does not reciprocate as she has a boyfriend, Billie Jackson (Devon Anderson). He later tells Peter and Fatboy about it, and subsequently Lucy finds out and tells Billie, which leads to him ending his relationship with Whitney, who knees Leon in the groin while Fatboy attempts to get Leon and Zsa Zsa back together, as Leon has not been himself since they split up.

Leon, Fatboy and Peter plan to go to a party in Hampshire, but Lucy, Whitney and Zsa Zsa offer Leon a night out in the woods instead, planning revenge getting Lucy pregnant and lying to Zsa Zsa. In the woods, Zsa Zsa comes out with pig's blood on her hands saying that she has been attacked. Knowing that it is a plan, Leon runs away and drunkenly ventures into the dark woods, cutting his hand. The next day the gang discover that Lucy let Leon run off and he was out all night. Peter and Fatboy then fear they hit Leon with the van the night before. Fatboy gets a voicemail from Leon saying he is hurt, and when he calls back, Zsa Zsa finds Leon's mobile phone in the leaves, smeared with blood. They decide to go to the police but Leon turns up, having been in police custody overnight for being drunk. Leon reveals that Lucy had an abortion and they all realise that Lucy was trying to turn them against him, so on their return to Walford, they play a prank on Lucy, leaving her humiliated. However, Lucy reveals to her father that they are squatting in one of his properties and he evicts them.

After Fatboy breaks a tree in Albert Square, Leon helps to replace it but is horrified to discover the body of Owen Turner (Lee Ross) buried beneath it. The next day Zsa Zsa makes a joke when Leon speaks after a prolonged silence, causing Leon to walk out. She finds him to apologise, as she had not realised the discovery had affected him badly. He then recalls the day his mother died in a car crash when it took an hour for firemen to cut him free and he was unable to lean over to close his mother's eyes. He admits to Zsa Zsa that he sometimes feels alone. He fails most of his GCSE exams. Months later he flirts with Glenda Mitchell (Glynis Barber) in the local bookmakers and agree to meet later. He obtains two tickets to a music festival in France and plans to take Zsa Zsa, but he reveals to Fatboy that he slept with Glenda, who tells Mercy, who then tells Zsa Zsa. Zsa Zsa asks Leon if he has seen anyone else but he says no. Zsa Zsa then seduces Leon in Fatboy's van before throwing him out in his underwear and leaving Walford for France. Leon decides that as his bags are packed he will go to France anyway, hinting that he will follow Zsa Zsa to apologise and resume their relationship. Before leaving, he tells Fatboy that he will always be his best friend and they continue to stay in touch.

== Other appearances ==
Leon also appears in extra content on the official EastEnders: E20 website. In one video, he catches Fatboy singing along to the Destiny's Child hit "Bootylicious" on webcam, and in another he is caught posing by Fatboy, who threatens to post the video on the Internet. A third video shows Leon filming Zsa Zsa as they mess around with their camera phones, ending with a kiss. Leon also makes a cameo appearance in the first episode of series 2 of EastEnders: E20, in which he punches Sol Levi (Tosin Cole) in the face after he gets involved in an argument between Fatboy and Naz Mehmet (Emaa Hussen).

== Reception ==
In her review of the first six months of 2010 in British soap operas, Ruth Deller from lowculture.co.uk wrote about Leon, "As someone who didn't watch E20 and therefore has no idea what backstory, if any, these characters had, Leon is probably the worst of the new gang – no family on the square, no distinctive personality, no plotline beyond impregnating Lucy Beale. The most interesting thing about him was when it looked like Peter Beale had run him over [...], and even that turned out to be nothing. [I] can't say [L]eon will be missed." A writer for The Northern Echo wondered if Leon, along with Fatboy and Zsa Zsa, brought a new injection of life into the soap or took away screen time from more established characters. In May 2010, Attwater received a nomination in the "Best Soap Newcomer" category at the 14th TVChoice Awards for his portrayal of Leon.
