= Asher Levi =

Fictional character in EastEnders: E20

- EastEnders: E20 character
- Portrayed by: Heshima Thompson
- Appears in: Series 2
- Created by: EastEnders: E20 writers team
In-universe information
- Mother: Caroline Levi
- Brothers: Sol Levi

Asher Levi is a fictional character from EastEnders: E20, an Internet spin-off of the BBC soap opera EastEnders. Played by Heshima Thompson, Asher is a main character in series two. He is a charismatic street dancer, who uses his talent to escape from his criminal past. As a father-figure to his younger brother Sol Levi (Tosin Cole), Asher occasionally resorts to stealing in order to provide for them both. He is willing to go to extreme lengths to protect Sol, including being stabbed by their schizophrenic mother. Over the course of the series, Asher betrays Sol by sleeping with his girlfriend, Naz Mehmet (Emaa Hussen). The two are ultimately able to reconcile, and Asher makes amends by encouraging his brother's dancing talent.

The character was created by the programme's team of thirteen writers, alongside the series' other main characters: Sol, Naz, and their friend Stevie Dickinson (Amanda Fairbank-Hynes). Thompson appreciated that the role allowed him to combine his love of acting and dancing. It brought him public recognition, and led fans of the series to hope that he and the other main characters would appear in the parent show, EastEnders.

== Storylines ==
After being evicted by their mother Caroline (Sandra Yaw), Asher and his younger brother Sol (Tosin Cole) move in with Walford resident Stevie Dickinson (Amanda Fairbank-Hynes). The brothers attend a dance audition, at which Asher is successful but Sol fails. Asher offers the judge a bribe on his brother's behalf, and is witnessed doing so by Fatboy (Ricky Norwood). He threatens him with a knife, revealing a stab wound on his abdomen, but disposes of the weapon when Fatboy leaves. While practicing dancing in the local community centre, Asher is mistaken for a Latin dance class instructor and steals the group's money. Though he attempts to find legitimate work, he is turned down due to having a criminal record, and again resorts to stealing.

When Sol begins a romantic relationship with his new friend Naz Mehmet (Emaa Hussen), Asher tells Naz's fiancé, Ekin Beg (Hemi Yeroham), that she is cheating on him. Ekin leads Sol to believe that Asher and Naz are an item, which causes Sol to insult them both. Annoyed, the two go clubbing together, and have sex after getting drunk and taking drugs. Naz later confesses the one-night stand to Sol, who punches his brother. He leaves Stevie's flat after Asher returns home drunk, having got into trouble selling stolen property. Asher later finds Sol with their mother, who has been hospitalised. It is revealed that she has schizophrenia, and that Asher's stab wound was caused by her. Asher apologises for sleeping with Naz, and tells Sol that she loves him. Finally, he encourages Sol to enter a dance competition. Though nervous, Sol is reassured by his brother and completes his routine to great acclaim.

== Other appearances ==
Asher appears in extra video content on the E20 website. In one video, he and Sol argue during filming of an advert for "SmasherDance"—a video in which they demonstrate various dancing styles—as Sol is more interested in getting food. The full SmasherDance advert is also on YouTube. In another video, the four friends play a drinking game in the local café, and in another he is an Elvis Presley impersonator marrying Naz and Ekin in Naz's nightmare.

== Creation, development and characterisation ==
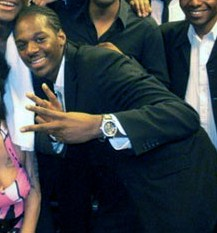
Heshima Thompson portrays Asher Levi.

Asher is one of the four main characters in series two of EastEnders: E20, alongside Sol, Naz and Stevie. They were created by the programme's team of thirteen writers. Actor and singer Heshima Thompson auditioned for the series, having learned about it from his agent. Part of the process involved a dance audition with Tony Adigun, the leader of dance group Avant Garde. Thompson was subsequently cast as Asher, and the character and his casting were announced on 28 July 2010. Deborah Sathe, the show's producer, expressed pride in the writers and stated, "[They] have created four new faces for [Albert] Square and their reaction to Walford life is really exciting." Thompson called E20 "a great project to be part of", and eagerly anticipated the dancing the role would entail. He later said in an interview with Daniel Kilkelly from entertainment news website Digital Spy that it was good to be able to combine his love of acting with his love of dance.

Asher is described on the E20 website as being charming and sexy, with the talent to make him a star. Thompson deemed his character "very confident" and a "bit of a bad boy". He is a hustler, who finds it difficult to refuse easy money, and seizes opportunities regardless of their legality. He has a criminal past, having recently been released from prison for theft prior to the start of the series. Thompson explained that Asher becomes a street dancer to help keep himself away from crime, which he commits in order to provide for Sol. He stated that Asher would "try his best to stay out of trouble", but may return to crime through learned behaviour.

Asher's life is complicated by his mother and brother. He has been a father-figure to Sol since a young age, and, as revealed in episode nine, has cared for him through their mother's schizophrenic episodes. Thompson assessed that Asher is not necessarily the best role model for Sol, but is willing to go to great lengths to protect him and ensure his success, such as being stabbed by his mother and giving away his father's Rolex watch to secure Sol a place in the dance group. Thompson said that looking after Sol has "taken a toll on [Asher]". Although he initially feels optimistic about moving to Walford, he loses perspective and makes a mistake by sleeping with Naz. Thompson deemed this out of character for Asher, as he loves his brother so much, but opined that despite his mistakes, Asher is still a good brother: "At heart, he's like anyone trying to do well. He wants to escape his old past and do well by his brother."

Aware of his own sex appeal, Asher's confidence and dance ability mean he has little difficulty in attracting women. Thompson characterises him as having youthful fun, rather than being "dirty". He feels he is easily intimidating, and intelligent enough to use his unpleasant façade to his advantage. This is demonstrated in the first episode, when he threatens Fatboy with a knife despite having no intention of using it.

== Reception ==
Appearing in EastEnders: E20 brought Thompson public recognition, from groups ranging from "screaming girls to proud parents". He has received comments on Asher's immoral behaviour, and compliments for his dancing. In October 2010, Thompson stated that many fans hoped Asher and the other E20 spin-off characters would go on to appear in EastEnders itself.

== See also ==
- List of EastEnders: E20 characters
