= Spooks: Code 9 =

- Also known as: Rogue Spooks, Spooks: Liberty; Spooks Club (working titles)
- Genre: Spy; Drama
- Created by: David Wolstencroft
- Written by: Chris Chibnall; Jack Lothian; Cameron McAllister; James Moran; Howard Overman; Ben Schiffer; David Wolstencroft
- Directed by: Toby Haynes; Brendan Maher; Mat Whitecross
- Starring: Michael Keogh; Liam Boyle; Joanne Froggatt; Ruta Gedmintas; Andrew Knott; Georgia Moffett; Christopher Simpson; Heshima Thompson; Lorraine Burroughs
- Country of origin: United Kingdom
- Original language: English
- No. of series: 1
- No. of episodes: 6

Production
- Executive producers: Karen Wilson; Sarah Brandist; Simon Crawford Collins; Eleanor Moran
- Producer: Chris Fry
- Production location: West Yorkshire
- Cinematography: Fabian Wagner
- Editors: Richard Mark Elson; Philip Hookway; David Mercer
- Camera setup: Paul Hanning; Jamie Hicks
- Running time: 50 minutes

Original release
- Network: BBC Three
- Release: 10 September – 7 October 2008

Related
- Spooks

Spooks: Code 9 (working titles – Rogue Spooks and Spooks: Liberty) is a counter-intelligence drama series broadcast on BBC Three in 2008.

The series was commissioned by BBC Fiction's controller Jane Tranter as a spin-off of their long-running drama Spooks, offering a "more maverick, younger perspective" that would attract a 16–24-year-old audience. The series follows a group of six new young MI5 recruits who "follow a different rule book". It was produced by the independent production company Kudos and was filmed in and around Leeds and Bradford. The first two episodes were broadcast on BBC Three on 10 August 2008 and repeated on the same channel on 11 August 2008.

The decision to relate the new project to the original Spooks was controversial, with star Georgia Moffett saying "it's slightly misleading in terms of the word Spooks." and producer Chris Fry saying "this is a completely new show. There are no crossover characters or storylines and, most importantly, it is set in a completely new world." After the first series ended relatively unsuccessfully (with an audience of 245,000 for the series finale) executive producer Karen Wilson claimed that many of the existing cast members were "contracted for another year" and outlined themes "we'd like to explore if we get a second series." However, due to low ratings and damning reviews, a second series was never commissioned.

== Plot ==
The series begins in 2012 (just after the 2012 Summer Olympics), when London and some of the south east has been evacuated in the wake of a nuclear attack during the opening ceremony of the Games. The government has relocated to Manchester; Thames House has been decommissioned, and MI5 is forced to set up offices across the UK in an attempt to help the country avoid new attacks.

== Cast ==
- Charlie Green (Liam Boyle) – an ex-mathematician who leads the team on an interim basis after the assassination of Hannah in the first episode. He gained the job after he stood up to Field Operations Director Sarah Yates (Lorraine Burroughs).
- Rachel Harris (Ruta Gedmintas) – a former police officer.
- Vik Kamath (Christopher Simpson) – an entrepreneur.
- Kylie Roman (Georgia Moffett) – a former psychology student.
- Rob Sullivan (Andrew Knott) – formerly a doctor, and now the team medic.
- Jez Cook (Heshima Thompson) – a reformed criminal.
- Sarah Yates (Lorraine Burroughs) – formerly head of operations for MI5
- Saeed Khan (Parvez Qadir) – director-general of MI6

== Marketing ==
The series was heavily promoted across the BBC channels, through conventional outdoor marketing and a viral marketing campaign by Agency Republic. As one of BBC Three's multi-platform programmes, there was also a heavy digital element, including streaming the programme live on the site simultaneously with its TV broadcast.

An experiential site called Facespook was launched in July 2008, which uses flash-based face-mapping to add 'you' into the video action. The story branches depending on choices you make.

Further interaction was through the extended reality site Liberty News, a 2013 news site created by online agency Six to Start. Offering relevant news stories associated with the episodes, the site was updated live during the programme with stories related to the on-screen action; the site encouraged role-play as though you were part of the in-series world to explore the issues raised. Following the last episode of the series, the site ran a live chat with characters representing various organisations relevant to the storylines. During this chat, the site was raided and the news organisation 'closed down'. The Liberty News site has since been archived.

== Episodes ==
| No. | Title | Directed by | Written by | Original release date | UK viewers (millions) |
|---|---|---|---|---|---|
| 1 | "A New Age" | Brendan Maher | Cal Bedford | 10 August 2008 | 1.02 |
As a new age of terrorists threatens the British Security Service, the government begins to recruit younger members into MI5. Ex-police officer Rachel runs her first undercover operation as Field Office 19 investigates the activities of a pair of suspected arms dealers. When Field Office leader Hannah is notified of a prime ministerial visit, she suspects an assassination plot; but with only six hours to stop him, will the team find the hitman in time?
| 2 | "Hackers" | Brendan Maher | Howard Overman | 10 August 2008 | 0.85 |
Hackers use the state Emergency Communications System to broadcast what they claim to behold video footage of dead prison inmates. When MI5 denounces the broadcast as a hoax, terrorists set off a series of false alerts. Mathematician Charlie suspects MI5 activity is related to the London bombing.
| 3 | "Fatality" | Mat Whitecross | Ben Schiffer | 17 August 2008 | N/A |
Jez and Kylie go undercover on a notorious housing estate to investigate a scam involving the sale of counterfeit radiation sickness medication, but the killing of a police officer puts the pair in grave danger. Meanwhile, officers question Rob about the death of a fellow medical student at the time of the London bombing, and Rachel and Charlie try to uncover the identity of the traitor within MI5.
| 4 | "The Ghost Man" | Mat Whitecross | Tony Basgallop and James Moran | 24 August 2008 | N/A |
Vik and Jez, investigating the brutal murder of two MI5 informants on the witness protection programme, discover that a loophole in the ID card system allows people to be tracked down through their biometric data, and that someone at the Missing Persons' Scheme may be implicated. Rachel goes undercover in search of the Ghost Man, hoping he can lead the team to the traitor within MI5.
| 5 | "Deal" | Toby Haynes | Cameron McAllister | 31 August 2008 | N/A |
Rob and Kylie, carrying out surveillance on a Korean businessman, followed him to a bank where eco-terrorists threaten to detonate a bomb strapped to the chief executive's daughter unless the businessman exposes an agreement to bury Korean nuclear waste in Britain. Will the team be able to free the hostages and stop the terrorists from completing their deadly mission? Charlie breaks into a prison camp to talk to one of the men wrongly imprisoned for the nuclear device that hit London, and discovers there may be a second nuclear bomb.
| 6 | "National Catastrophe" | Toby Haynes | Jack Lothian | 7 September 2008 | 0.24 |
With the anniversary of the London attack imminent and the knowledge there may be a second nuclear device still out there, Charlie and the team have 24 hours to locate the bomb and identify the MI5 traitor before another major national catastrophe is allowed to happen. Charlie is convinced that Abid Malik can lead him to the traitor, so Vik and Rob are sent undercover to Camp Windsmere to break him out.

== Reception ==
=== Audience ===
The first episode of the series had (estimated) 810,000 viewers for a multichannel share of 3.8%, with the second episode (broadcast immediately after the first) having 703,000 viewers and 4.0% share. The third episode (broadcast a week later) attracted 447,000 viewers and 2.1% multichannel share, having "lost nearly half of its audience last night, 17 August, compared with last Sunday's launch." The fourth episode, broadcast on 24 August, attracted 288,000 viewers and 1.4% multichannel share, the fifth (31 August) having 353,000 viewers, and the sixth (7 September) 245,000.

=== Reviews ===
For The Times reviewer Andrew Billen said the series "fancies itself as gritty and hip" and that it was "to Spooks what Torchwood is to Doctor Who (ie, not as good)", adding criticism of what he saw as its low budget, its combination of "state torture with a boozy, flirty This Life house-share", and its failure of nerve in not fully linking the attack "with either the Olympics or al-Qaeda". Roland White in The Sunday Times concluded "The script is poor and the acting little better. It's like watching recent graduates takes their first management-training exercise."

A preliminary piece in The Daily Telegraph wondered if the series could avoid accusations of trying to cash in on Spooks despite being "a spin-off with almost nothing in common with its namesake", whilst other reviews in the same paper called the general scenario "daft and unconvincing" and too ludicrous to work as well as similar spin-offs. Though the Telegraph did find some praise for the "surprising twist" in the first episode, it lampooned the nuclear attack for having seemingly "killed everyone over the age of 40" and left MI5 "staffed purely by the young and good-looking", comparing the series' youthful cast with that of Skins.

Internet reception by fans of the original Spooks was generally negative, largely due to the absence of any reference to the events of the main series. A review of the first episode by website Digital Spy found the show "utterly uninspired and stale", "shambolically written", "patronising", and "amateurish". The second episode "is certainly an improvement on the dire opener, although that's hardly a compliment." But "the entire show comes across as one of those school teachers who tries desperately to be trendy and get down wiv da kidz" and "has yet to show ...that it can transcend its current status as a piece of condescending, uninvolving tripe." However, by the sixth episode Digital Spy had detected a "stark improvement in the latter half of the first season", saying the finale "summed up the uneven nature of the season, but ultimately delivered a reasonably absorbing glimpse of a claustrophobic and panic-strewn future" that "leaves us wanting more...." But "was the budget being saved up for the grand finale? If so, that's a dodgy move indeed as ratings have shown that not many viewers have stuck around."

The Guardian described it as "a spin-off too far", with "clunky, lazy writing", "ropey indeed.... an utterly cynical venture and a damning indictment of the lack of imagination at work in commissioning new drama," going on to say that "given its patronising awfulness, SC9 actually damages the Spooks brand." Discussing The Guardian's opinion a year later, Adrian Hon (who was responsible for the Liberty News website) said "the branding plan had backfired" and if it had been launched with "a different name (i.e. not Spooks), everyone would have given the show more of a chance." In his opinion "they got it backwards": the first two episodes being "equally painful to watch", later episodes improved and episode six "really quite entertaining. In fact, the first minutes of the finale are captivating.... That's how SC9 should've started."
