= Naz Mehmet =

Fictional character in EastEnders: E20

- EastEnders: E20 character
- Portrayed by: Emaa Hussen
- First appearance: Series 2, episode 1
- Last appearance: Series 3, episode 1
- Created by: EastEnders: E20 writers team
In-universe information
- Occupation: Student
- Father: Mr Mehmet
- Mother: Mrs Mehmet

Nazan "Naz" Mehmet is a fictional character from EastEnders: E20, an Internet spin-off from the BBC soap opera EastEnders, played by Emaa Hussen. Naz is a main character in series 2, where she is joined by brothers Asher (Heshima Thompson) and Sol Levi (Tosin Cole), and Stevie Dickinson (Amanda Fairbank-Hynes). Naz is torn between two worlds: her traditional Muslim family life and modern London life. She loves and respects her family but also loves to party. She falls in love with Sol despite being engaged to Ekin Beg (Hemi Yeroham) by arrangement. This leads to Naz and Sol falling out and she sleeps with Asher, but eventually reunites with Sol. She is described as confident, strong, fiery and a troublemaker. Hussen briefly reprised the role in series 3.

== Storylines ==
Naz arrives in Walford having bought a fake ID from Fatboy (Ricky Norwood), but she is angry that the photo looks nothing like her and the age is too high, so she steals her money back from him. He chases after her but she is rescued by Sol Levi (Tosin Cole). She removes her makeup and changes into plain clothes to return home but hears her father (Nayeef Rashed) shouting so leaves. She meets Sol and his older brother Asher (Heshima Thompson), and goes with them to Stevie Dickinson's (Amanda Fairbank-Hynes) flat where Stevie allows them to stay. Naz and Sol begin to bond, and she kisses him to avoid being seen by Ekin Beg (Hemi Yeroham). However, Ekin later finds her and takes her to her parents' house where it is revealed that Naz and Ekin are to be married. Naz and Sol almost kiss twice but are interrupted both times, the second time by the arrival of Ekin, who tells Naz's friends they are engaged. Naz and Sol argue and she says she is not engaged to Ekin but then says she is, leaving Sol angry. She then discovers it is Stevie's birthday and arranges a surprise dinner party for her. Stevie tells her that Sol likes her and she should kiss him, but he insults her because Ekin has inadvertently led him to believe Asher and Naz are seeing each other.

Naz and Asher go clubbing and get drunk and high on drugs, and though Sol sends her an apologetic text message, Asher deletes it before Naz sees it. Naz and Asher end up having sex, but he abandons her afterwards and Sol finds her and apologises. They reconcile but she feels guilty. The next day they wake up after spending the night in the same bed, and Naz later watches Sol at dance rehearsals. Asher returns a necklace to Naz, and Sol sees this. He confronts her about it and she reveals she had a one-night stand with Asher but it meant nothing to her. She insists she did not receive Sol's text message but he is still angry. In an attempt to get Naz and Sol to reconcile again, Stevie pretends to swallow the key to the flat's front door, leaving them trapped. Naz reveals she is going to Turkey to meet Ekin's family and Sol angrily says she can stay there. When left alone, they get close again, but Asher interrupts them when he returns. Stevie drops the key revealing she did not swallow it and Sol thinks Naz was in on the plan so he sarcastically tells her to enjoy Turkey before leaving. She returns home and prepares to leave for Turkey but her father discovers she has escaped through a window. She returns to the flat but her father and Ekin come after her and try to take her back home. Sol stops the car and Naz gets out and they kiss. Later at the dance-off, she and her father talk and he finally accepts her choice of boyfriend.

In series 3, Naz and Sol are seen briefly together, and they are still a couple.

== Creation, development and characterisation ==
Naz is one of four main characters from series two of EastEnders: E20, created by its team of thirteen writers, along with Asher, Sol and Stevie. Newcomer Emaa Hussen was cast in the role, and said: "It's a really exciting place to start my career. I'm from East London and a big fan of EastEnders, which is one of the reasons I wanted to do the show." Hussen said she was offered the part as the producers saw something "authentic and real" in her and that she could play the character how they wanted, and said she is similar to the character in some ways, adding that she enjoyed playing a strong character and felt like Naz as soon as she got into costume. The character and casting were announced on 28 July 2010. The show's producer, Deborah Sathe, said "I am [...] proud of what the writers have achieved. [They] have created four new faces for [Albert] Square and their reaction to Walford life is really exciting."

The character, of Turkish descent, is described as being "torn between two worlds", which Hussen explained are her traditional family life and modern London life. Naz is a family girl who has reached a point in her life where she wants to have fun, but is also a daddy's girl, the apple of her father's eye. He sees her as a perfect student. She has a good relationship with her parents and is respectful of them, doing what they want, even though they do not know her very well. She loves her family but they do not understand her or what she wants. Hussen opined that Naz would be a good girl if her family did understand her more. What Naz wants is to be like everyone around her and to be able to pick her own boyfriend, but being from a Muslim family means she is unable to. She tries to keep each side of her life secret from the other, but more of each side is seen as the series goes on, and they eventually meet, leading to bad consequences. Hussen opined that this is a common real-life situation that is rarely portrayed on television, so girls would be able relate to the character. Naz likes to make everyone happy but ultimately is more likely to think about her own happiness; she likes to get her own way.

Naz believes that her new friends can take her away from her home life. She falls in love with Sol, which Hussen said leads to Naz having to make a difficult decision as Sol is "the wrong person". Naz turns out to be not as strong as first expected, and she puts up a wall. Hussen said that there is something about Sol that attracts her, and as she is stronger than he is, she sees it as taking him in and teaching him. Sol falls for Naz very quickly, and Cole said they have never met people like each other before. Naz is a party girl who loves to have fun, but causes trouble and drama, such as when her argument with Fatboy in episode 1 leads to a fight between the main characters of series 1 and 2. Hussen said that this was her favourite scene to film. Not everyone gets on with Naz straight away. She is confident and fiery, she has a strong power and people listen to what she has to say. Emer Kenny, who played Zsa Zsa Carter in series 1 of EastEnders: E20 and was one of the writers, introducing the characters in the first episode, said that although Naz was her favourite character to write for, she found it a challenge as she is funny but not a "clown" like Fatboy. Kenny compared Naz to Zsa Zsa, saying she is clever but cool, feisty, sassy and able to outwit Fatboy. Kenny also admired the character's costume and makeup, saying she looked perfect and was exactly as she imagined her to look.

== Other appearances ==
Naz is one of four characters from series 2 who has an official profile on social networking site Twitter, along with Stevie, Stevie's boyfriend Olly Manthrope-Hall (Joshua McGuire) and Fatboy, where it is revealed that the character works in a kebab shop during the summer holiday. Further posts on Twitter allude to the storyline running up to the start of the series, such as Naz buying the fake ID from Fatboy. Naz also appears in extra video content on the E20 website. In one video, she attempts to take a photo of herself to use on her fake ID. In another, Stevie and Naz have a picnic in the park, and Naz makes a video of Stevie, hoping to make Olly jealous, but Stevie ends up with cake on her face. In another video, the four friends play a drinking game in the café. Another scene features Stevie and Naz talking about kissing, and another features a nightmare scenario of her and Ekin getting married in a Laz Vegas wedding chapel.

== See also ==
- List of EastEnders: E20 characters
