= Bunmi Mojekwu =

English actress

- Born: Oluwabunmi Adaeze Mojekwu; 10 February 1989 (age 37); Brixton, London, England
- Education: Kingston University
- Occupation: Actress
- Years active: 2008–present

Bunmi Adaeze Mojekwu (born 10 February 1989) is an English actress. She is known for her role as Mercy Olubunmi in the BBC soap opera EastEnders (2010–2011).

== Early life and education ==
Mojekwu was born in Brixton, South London, to Nigerian parents. She is the eldest of four children. In 2006, her family moved to Strood, Kent, while Mojekwu attended St Simon Stock Catholic School in Maidstone. She had a small role in a school production of The Wizard of Oz.

Also in 2006, Mojekwu joined Identity Drama School in Kent and won the school's Actress of the Year award. She graduated from Kingston University in 2010 with a Bachelor of Arts in Business and Media Studies.

== Career ==
Mojekwu went on to play Paris in Bola Agbaje's award-winning play Gone Too Far!. In 2008, she played Ronnie Kiffin in the Channel 4 crime drama television film Fallout.

In 2009, Mojekwu was cast as Mercy Olubunmi in the Internet teen drama EastEnders: E20, a spin-off of the long-running BBC One soap opera EastEnders, which was broadcast in January 2010. Following this, she was contracted for six months to reprise her role as Mercy Olubunmi in the main EastEnders show. She left EastEnders on-screen on 12 July 2011.

Mojekwu made her feature film debut in MJ Delaney's 2013 comedy Powder Room. In 2016, Mojekwu founded Bam Film Productions.

Mojekwu featured in a 2022 BBC Two documentary about colourism with reality star Tan France titled Beauty and the Bleach.

== Filmography ==
Year	Title	Role	Notes
2008	The Bill	Isabel Prentice	1 episode: "Teacher's Pet"
2008	Fallout	Ronnie Kiffin	Television film
2009	Misfits	Jodi	Series 1, episode 3
2009	Coming Up	Aleysha	1 episode: "Apples and Oranges"
2010	EastEnders: E20	Mercy Olubunmi	Main role; web series
2010–2011	EastEnders	Mercy Olubunmi	Series regular
2013	Powder Room	Louise	Film
2016	Hush	Odera	Short film
2017	Quacks	Working Girl	1 episode
2021	In Case of Incasity	Gloria	Short film
2022	Beauty and the Bleach	Herself	Television documentary
2022	Castle in the Sky	Margaret	Short film
