= Sam Attwater =

English actor and singer (born 1986)

- Born: Samuel Attwater; 10 April 1986 (age 40); Basingstoke, Hampshire, England
- Education: Italia Conti Academy of Theatre Arts
- Occupation: Actor
- Years active: 2007–present
- Television: EastEnders; EastEnders: E20
- Spouse: Vicky Ogden (m. 2014)
- Children: 2

Samuel Attwater (born 10 April 1986) is an English actor and singer who played Leon Small in the British soap opera EastEnders and its online spin-off EastEnders: E20.

He won the sixth series of Dancing on Ice in March 2011 and participated in the 'All Stars' series in 2014. He was eliminated 11th, finishing in 4th place.

== Career ==
=== Acting ===
Attwater trained at the Italia Conti Academy of Theatre Arts and went on to star in musicals such as Tonight's the Night, 12 Tenors, 20th Century Boy, and Our Benny. He appeared as a dancer in Bollywood film Jhoom Barabar Jhoom and featured in four episodes of Hollyoaks in 2009, playing Ricky. In January 2010 he starred in the EastEnders spin-off EastEnders: E20 as Leon Small and went on to become a regular cast member in EastEnders, but was axed in May 2010, making his last on-screen appearance on 30 September 2010.

=== Singing ===
Attwater's debut EP, Breaking Boundaries, was released on 24 January 2011.

=== Dancing on Ice ===
In December 2010, it was announced that Attwater would be competing in the sixth series of Dancing on Ice in 2011. Attwater was partnered by neon figure skater Brianne Delcourt. Attwater won the series on 27 March 2011, beating Laura Hamilton in the final. He then went on to perform alongside gold medal winning skaters Torvill and Dean, on the Dancing on Ice Live Tour 2011, touring around the UK performing at arenas such as the Birmingham NIA and Wembley Stadium.

Sam finished fourth in the 'All Stars' series of Dancing on Ice with his fiance Vicky Ogden after they lost out to Ray Quinn and his partner Maria Filippov but head judge Robin Cousins praised Sam and his skating work.

=== West End ===
On 18 July 2011, Sam made his West End debut playing the character of "Norman" in hit West End musical "Dreamboats & Petticoats" at the Playhouse Theatre. He also performed "The Wanderer" a song from the musical, on ITV's "This Morning" on 4 August 2011. He then also appeared on "The Alan Titchmarsh Show" performing with some of the cast of Dreamboats and Petticoats, on 13 October 2011.

Between September 2013 and February 2014, Sam has appeared as Adam Pontipee in a nationwide tour of Seven Brides for Seven Brothers.

From January 2020 to February 2020, Sam starred in a West End adaptation of Rags the Musical where he played “Micheal the moustache man”

== Personal life ==
Attwater married Vicky Ogden in 2014, making them the first Dancing on Ice couple to marry. In 2016, Ogden gave birth to their two daughters.

== Filmography ==
Year	Title	Role	Notes
2009	Hollyoaks	Ricky Campbell	4 episodes
2010	EastEnders	Leon Small	42 episodes
2010	EastEnders: E20	Leon Small	13 episodes
2016	Mr Selfridge	Bumby Wallace	1 episode
