= Heshima Thompson =

British singer and actor

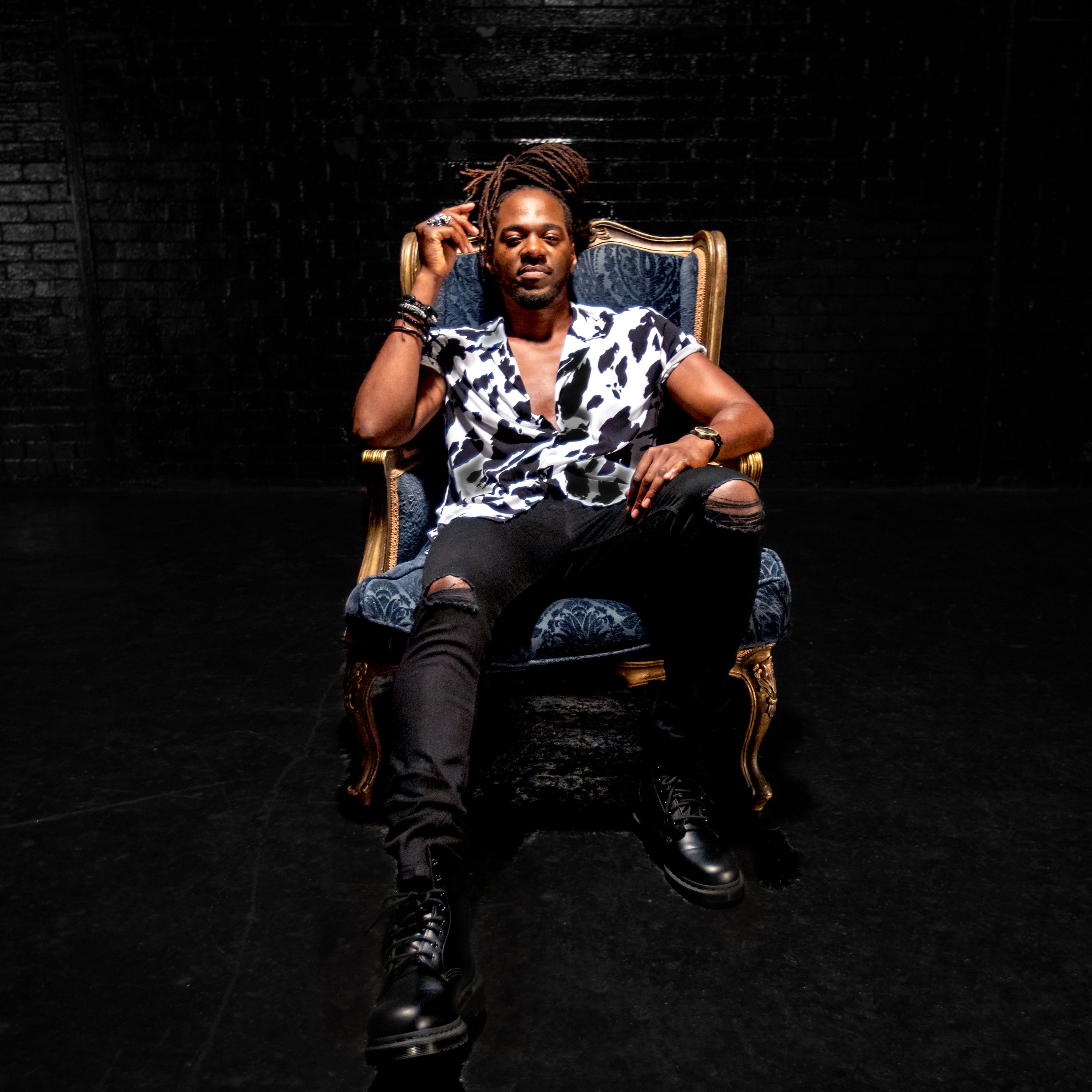
- Thompson on set of Come Thru music video shoot
- Born: Heshima Salim Thompson; 23 October 1986 (age 39); Brent, London, England
- Occupations: Entrepreneur; actor; singer; dancer
- Years active: 2002–present
- Spouse: Mrs. Thompson
- Website: www.iamht.com

Heshima Salim Thompson (/ˈiːʃmə/ EESH-mə; born 23 October 1986) is a British actor and singer.

Born in the London Borough of Brent, son of Jamaican Reggae singer Dr Alimantado and brother of soul singer Zalon.

In 2001, Heshima began his career singing on BBC Documentary Heart of Harlesden, he was scouted from the documentary to play a lead role in BBC’s Babyfather. He has appeared on television in Spooks, Spooks: Code 9 as Jez, Prime Suspect, Casualty, City Lights and Judge John Deed. In theatre he has appeared at The Young Vic in Generations and at the Royal Court Theatre in Incomplete and Random Acts of Violence. In 2009, he was nominated for a Screen Nation Award in the Young Shooting Star category. Heshima toured with Amy Winehouse along with brother Zalon on her Back to Black album which was only scheduled to last for 3 months, but the tour was so successful they ended up touring for six years and collected five Grammy Awards.

In 2009, he auditioned for the sixth series of The X Factor and in 2011, he auditioned for the eighth series. In 2010, he was cast as Asher Levi in series 2 of EastEnders: E20.

In March 2012, Thompson auditioned for the first series of The Voice UK After four chair turns, Heshima chose will.i.am as his coach and made it to the battle rounds of the competition. Heshima worked with Zalon, Salaam Remi and Mark Ronson singing and vocal producing on Amy Winehouse's Album Lioness: Hidden Treasures including singles "Our Day Will Come" and "Like Smoke", which features Nas. Lioness: Hidden Treasures debuted at number one on the UK Albums Chart.

In 2014, Heshima founded HTG Entertainment a British entertainment agency.

== Filmography ==
Year	Series	Role	Notes
2002	Babyfather	Eric	4 episodes
2003	Spooks	JJ	1 episode
2003	The Bill	Leo Price	4 episodes
2004	Holby City	Tyler Lindford	1 episode: "Smoke and Mirrors"
2005	Judge John Deed	Sky Rudkin	1 episode: "Above the Law"
2005	Ahead of the Class	Rory	
2006	Prime Suspect: The Final Act	Curtis Flynn	
2008	Spooks: Code 9	Jeremy 'Jez' Cook	6 episodes
2009	Casualty	Cole	1 episode: "No Going Back"
2010	EastEnders: E20	Asher Levi	Series 2
2011	The X Factor	Himself	Series 8
2012	The Voice UK	Himself	Series 1
