= Vanessa Gold =

Fictional character from EastEnders

- EastEnders character
- Portrayed by: Zöe Lucker
- Duration: 2010–2011
- First appearance: Episode 4013; 4 June 2010
- Last appearance: Episode 4295; 6 October 2011
- Created by: Simon Ashdown
- Introduced by: Diederick Santer & Bryan Kirkwood
In-universe information
- Occupation: Businesswoman
- Husband: Harry Gold (until 2011)
- Daughters: Jodie Gold

Vanessa Gold is a fictional character from the BBC soap opera EastEnders. She is portrayed by Zöe Lucker, and first appeared in EastEnders in the episode broadcast on 4 June 2010. A "dynamic and assured" businesswoman, Vanessa was created by series consultant Simon Ashdown to be "a Zöe Lucker-type". Lucker accepted the role on a seven-episode contract, which was extended after she impressed the series producers with her performance. In April 2011, it was announced that Lucker was to leave the show. She departed on 6 October 2011, after the conclusion of her storylines.

Vanessa was introduced as a love interest for local car salesman Max Branning (Jake Wood), intended to facilitate a reunion between Max and his former wife Tanya Branning (Jo Joyner). Concurrent to their romance, which was extended to span Lucker's increased tenure, Vanessa separates from her husband Harry (Linal Haft), and reveals that he is not the father of her teenage daughter Jodie (Kylie Babbington). Lucker describes Vanessa as a glamorous risk-taker, who does not fit into the soap's Albert Square setting. She received critical praise for her comic timing in the role, and was nominated Most Popular Newcomer at the 2010 Inside Soap Awards.

== Creation and development ==
=== Conception and introduction ===
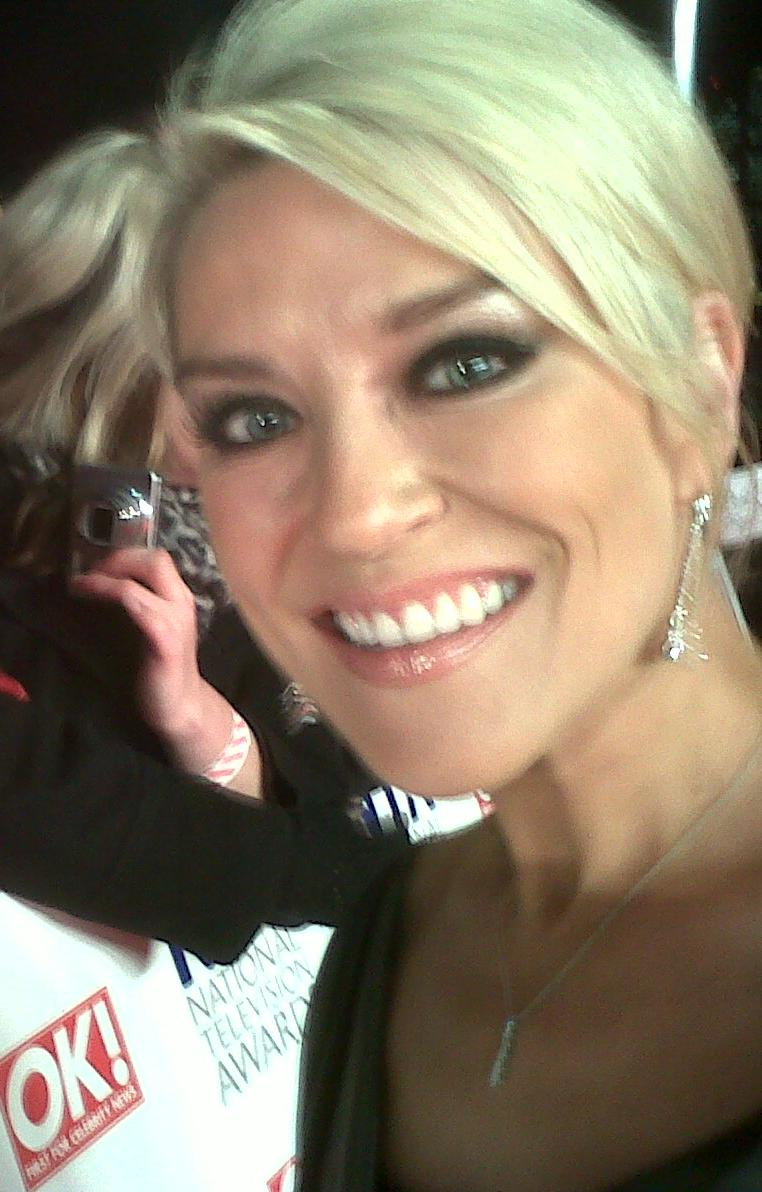
Vanessa was envisioned as a "Zöe Lucker-type" character (Lucker, pictured).

Vanessa was created by EastEnders series consultant Simon Ashdown, who wanted a "Zöe Lucker-type" character in the show. Lucker was approached and agreed to take on the role, initially on a seven-episode contract. The character was intended to help her love-interest Max realise that he was still in love with his ex-wife Tanya. Her impending arrival was announced by media entertainment website Digital Spy on 20 March 2010, at which point Lucker deemed herself a "huge fan" of the series, eagerly anticipated working alongside Wood. She later told the website that accepting the role "just felt so right, especially at this stage in [her] life."

Lucker was the third signing of new executive producer Bryan Kirkwood, following the reintroduction of Kat (Jessie Wallace) and Alfie Moon (Shane Richie). Kirkwood described Vanessa as "a strong confident force of nature who will play Max at his own game", while a spokesperson for the series said, "[Max and Vanessa] are both volatile and explosive characters and their meeting will be like putting a lit match next to a barrel [of] gunpowder." Pleased by the "absolutely perfect" casting, Kirkwood also anticipated Lucker and Wood's screen partnership. After filming began, Wood called Lucker a "fantastic addition" to the show, "fabulous" in the role and "a joy" to work with.

Vanessa's first appearance was in Kirkwood's first episode as executive producer. Originally scheduled for 7 June 2010, it actually aired on 4 June. Many of Lucker's first scenes involved driving a five-and-a-half litre Mercedes, which caused her some concern as she had only passed her driving test four weeks previously. Four days after her arrival, it was announced that Lucker's performance had so impressed the series producers that she had signed a new contract to appear more permanently.

=== Characterisation ===
Vanessa is a businesswoman who is described as "dynamic and assured". In an interview with Digital Spy, Kirkwood said Vanessa was strong-minded and quite positive, and they wanted a female character with a different energy to the many "strong, feisty, shouty" women in the show. He added: "She knows that she's likely to rub women up the wrong way and she knows what she wants. But she doesn't intimidate or use bullyboy tactics. She's clever, interesting and she might just have a secret." Lucker described Vanessa as savvy, strong, stylish, glamorous, a risk-taker who gets bored very easily, complicated, hard-working, laid-back, a doting mother, and opined that she looks out of place in Albert Square. Lucker went shopping with the costume department and it was decided that Vanessa would wear light-coloured clothing. Lucker said Vanessa's style is "very smart; power dressing really". Some of her clothes come from Reiss and Zara. During an interview on Loose Women, Lucker said Vanessa has "big" hair, which took 45 minutes to style. A full set of heated rollers was used, then it would be then backcombed and Lucker groomed it herself afterwards. She said that people often though she wore a wig to play Vanessa but it was her real hair. By the time Lucker left the series, she said her hair was so big that "it was ridiculous." Although Lucker is from the north of England and EastEnders is set in London, Lucker used her own accent.

=== Storyline development ===
Soon after Vanessa and her daughter Jodie appear, so does Vanessa's husband Harry, who is shown to be very controlling of Vanessa. In September 2010, Lucker said that she and Max's ex-wife Tanya could become friends as they are fairly similar, adding, "I think Vanessa probably really likes Tanya and I'm hoping that Tanya will warm to Vanessa. They've obviously got Max in common, so you never quite know which way that's going to work out". Lucker later said that she hoped Max and Vanessa would stay strong despite Harry's threats for revenge, calling them a "lovely couple".

In May 2011, it was reported that Max would cheat on Vanessa with Tanya. Lucker predicted that if Vanessa found out about the affair, it would be "very, very explosive". She said that Vanessa would fight to keep Max if she had to, and when asked if Vanessa would take revenge, she said, "We haven't seen that side to Vanessa, but I think she's pretty tough and if pushed, who knows how far she'd actually go? [...] Vanessa is trying hard to make Max realise that she is the right woman for him. What lengths will she go to in order to keep her man?" Kirkwood commented on the storyline, saying, "People had better duck for cover when Vanessa finds out that she's been betrayed again. She stood by her ex-husband Harry for years and in no time at all, she finds herself in the very same situation with Max. The end of that relationship doesn't mean the end of Vanessa, though. She's got a really exciting storyline still in store. It kicks off over the summer and there's a big change of direction for the character that will really give Vanessa some momentum for the time she's got left in Albert Square." Lucker said that viewers would see a more vulnerable side to Vanessa as she realises Max still loves Tanya.

=== Departure ===
It was announced on 30 April 2011 that Lucker was to depart from the series and would have an "explosive" departure. A spokesperson told Digital Spy: "Zöe was brought into EastEnders for a storyline playing Max's love interest and will go out with a bang. Zöe has done a fabulous job of bringing the character of Vanessa to life and the door has been left wide open for her return." An EastEnders insider said "Vanessa has proved to be a popular character and although her exit storyline will be explosive, there is every belief that she may return to the Square in the future." Lucker and Kirkwood both promised that Vanessa's exit storyline would be "exciting", and said that viewers had not seen the "full force" of Vanessa, explaining that there is much more to come before her departure.

== Storylines ==
Vanessa arrives in Albert Square to purchase a car from salesman Max Branning (Jake Wood). When she returns to sign her paperwork, the two kiss and are seen by Max's daughter Abi (Lorna Fitzgerald). Max's employee and lodger Darren Miller (Charlie G. Hawkins) begins dating Vanessa's daughter Jodie, unaware of the connection between them. Upon realising that they are mother and daughter, he and Max toss a coin to decide which one of them will terminate their new relationship. Max loses, but continues to see Vanessa regardless. Suspicious that Max may still be in love with his estranged wife Tanya (Jo Joyner), Vanessa returns to her controlling husband Harry (Linal Haft) in Chigwell. The two later reconcile, and Vanessa moves in with Max when Harry discovers the affair and breaks up with her. Jodie disowns her mother over her infidelity, but recants after they narrowly escape a fire in the local pub. Jodie plans to separate from Darren, as she feels uncomfortable spending time in his and Max's home while her father is alone in Chigwell. Instead, Vanessa sacrifices her relationship with Max, and moves back in with Harry.

The following week, Vanessa meets and gets on well with Tanya. On Vanessa's birthday, Tanya interrupts her celebration dinner to tell her Max misses her and that she should go back to him. Jodie agrees, having realised that her father treats her mother badly. Vanessa returns to Max, and Harry serves her with divorce papers. His claim that Jodie has always been a "daddy's girl" prompts Vanessa to reveal he is not her father. Harry begins a series of escalating attacks against Vanessa. Having learned that Harry is not her father, Jodie briefly disowns Vanessa again, before forgiving her. Vanessa tells Jodie that her real father is a Portuguese fisherman, whose name she did not know. Harry's attacks continue: he throws a brick through their window, slashes the tyres at Max's car lot and all of Vanessa's clothes, and kills Jodie's cat. Max and his brother Jack (Scott Maslen) threaten Harry, who retaliates by having Jack locked in the boot of his car on the night of his wedding.

Unbeknownst to Vanessa, Max's feelings for Tanya resurface. Although she remarries, he kisses her on her wedding day and continues to harbour hope that they will reconcile. Max's one year anniversary with Vanessa passes, and Max upsets her with his disinterest. She soon realises that he is still not over Tanya, and when she comforts him, Max makes a spur of the moment marriage proposal, which Vanessa accepts. However, Max and Tanya continue to have an affair, secretly meeting in a bedsit. Vanessa later finds perfume that she knows is not hers or Jodie's, and tells Tanya she knows Max is cheating. Tanya says it is her perfume that Lauren borrowed, and tells Vanessa that Max is not cheating. Vanessa takes off her engagement ring to clean the house and she panics when she cannot find it, though it is revealed that Max has it.

Vanessa is led to believe that Max is fully on board with the idea of a double wedding with Darren and Jodie, so cooks a candle-lit dinner for Max, unaware that he is meeting up with Tanya again because they are preparing to inform their partners of their affair. However, Tanya breaks up with Max and he returns home deflated. He tells Vanessa that he no longer loves her and breaks up with her. Vanessa is furious and heartbroken, accusing another woman of being involved. When Max's daughter Lauren Branning (Jacqueline Jossa) overhears this, she informs Vanessa, along with the rest of the family, that Tanya is the other woman. Vanessa confronts Tanya, slapping her, and reveals the affair to Tanya's husband Greg Jessop (Stefan Booth). Max leaves Walford but Vanessa believes he will come back to her. Vanessa discovers the bedsit and is stunned when Tanya tells her she broke up with Max and she does not know where he is, saying that if he has left Vanessa, it is because he no longer loves her. Vanessa returns home and completely loses control, smashing up the house. Max's sister Carol Jackson (Lindsey Coulson) and Jack agree to throw Vanessa out so Tanya and her family can live there, but find her smashing Max's photos, so Carol throws her out onto the street. Michael and his father Eddie Moon (David Essex) witness this and go to help. Vanessa tells Michael that Eddie is a good dad. However, Michael, who is plotting revenge against his father, informs Vanessa that Eddie destroyed his mother's life, before offering Vanessa cash to do the same to Eddie. Vanessa reluctantly agrees, desperate for money to fund Jodie's upcoming wedding. Vanessa gets back in touch with Harry after several months without contact, and asks if he will help pay for the wedding. Harry agrees as long as Vanessa will not attend, but Jodie learns of this and tells Harry not to come.

Vanessa confesses her true feelings for Eddie, but he rejects her; however, they later sleep together. Eddie and Vanessa's relationship continues, and eventually she moves in with him and his family, to Michael's despair. Michael attempts to pay Vanessa to leave, and she takes the money, but does not leave Eddie. Eddie then plans to move to Spain, and asks Vanessa to steal Michael's money, which she does. However, she panics as she is caught on CCTV, and tells Jodie what she has done. She says goodbye to Jodie, thinking she will go to prison, and then meets Eddie, thinking he is taking her with him to Spain. After she hands the cash to Eddie, he leaves her stranded on the street, telling her that the police are looking for her. A defeated Vanessa leaves Walford.

== Reception ==
Lucker was nominated for the "Most Popular Newcomer" award at the 2010 Inside Soap Awards for her portrayal of Vanessa but lost out to her EastEnders co-star, Ricky Norwood (Fatboy). The Guardian gave Vanessa an "Individual style award" in their "alternative soap awards", saying "There's more diversity of colour at a Ku Klux Klan Grand Wizards' Congress than in Vanessa's wardrobe. Drawing her inspiration in equal parts from whipped cream and Logan's Run, Vanessa's retro-futuristic look revolves around her signature white trouser suit, evidently versatile and stain-resistant enough for shopping, cooking, cleaning and servicing Max on the car lot desk." After Lucker left the show, Gay Times called Vanessa a "legend" and said she had a "gay legacy". Joe Anderton of Digital Spy called Vanessa a "gay icon".

In 2016, Daniel Kilkelly from Digital Spy put Vanessa on his list of seven characters that left EastEnders too soon, writing, "Guys, guys – you don't bring in Zöe Lucker and then do nothing with her. Hopes were sky high when EastEnders announced the arrival of the Footballers' Wives star as Vanessa Gold in 2010, especially when her planned short stint was extended into a regular role. Unfortunately, the writers forgot to think up any storylines for her. Poor Vanessa turned into little more than a spare part doing the cooking and cleaning at the Branning house while Max concentrated on a steamy affair with his ex-wife Tanya. When the truth was revealed, Vanessa did bring us the iconic "bubbly's in the fridge" meltdown, as she waged war on "Branning scum" (and Branning curtains). But not even going viral on YouTube was enough to save her when producers finally cut their losses – just when we were starting to like her."

=== "Bubbly's in the fridge" ===
After Vanessa discovers Max's affair with Tanya, she finds a scrunched up note from Max to Tanya reading "Bubbly in the fridge". She then dwells on this back at Max's home, before then flying in a fit of rage and destroying the living room, tearing curtains from their hooks, swiping everything from a sideboard, tipping over a coffee table, and then stabbing a photo frame. Lucker revealed that the script, which she said reminded her of Mommie Dearest, only called for her to say the line "bubbly's in the fridge" once, but she said it a lot more, which Lucker said led to the scenes becoming "a bit more of a big deal." Lucker was not aware of how the "bubbly in the fridge" meltdown became an internet hit, and did not know what it meant to be trending on Twitter. She told Digital Spy: "It's so weird, because I'm a huge technophobe! [...] I wasn't aware of all this, but I suddenly started getting all these texts saying, 'You're trending on Twitter!' I had no idea what that meant at all! My other half had to explain it to me, but it's great. I'm glad that people enjoyed what they saw." She explained that executive producer Bryan Kirkwood had called her to say there was a mash-up of the video on the internet. She said she had not yet seen it but would get someone to show her how.

Inside Soap called the scenes "Pure soap gold", while Devon newspaper Midweek Herald described the scenes as "reminiscent of horror movie The Shining" and said that "Vanessa Gold last week stabbed at a photo frame like a woman possessed". They added that the "immaculately-styled and normally ultra house-proud Vanessa slipped into psycho mode." The newspaper held an online poll, which revealed that 80% of those who took part would follow in Vanessa's footsteps if they discovered their partner was cheating. In 2016, Digital Spy listed the scene among their "10 of the best soap rampages", calling it a "somewhat amusing meltdown".

The scene became a standalone meme in animated GIF format and the phrase gained an entry on Urban Dictionary and became a technical expression among television viewers for any character in any soap opera who has a similar meltdown. Lucker discovered it had become a meme in December 2017 and revealed that people were still quoting the phrase to her, and that "Bubbly's in the fridge" post-it notes had been placed in the toilets of gay nightclub G-A-Y. Lucker said the scene was "relatable" because "we all have moments when we're angry or frustrated, but we tend to internalise it because our subconscious tells us it'd cost a fortune to replace everything, and, we'd potentially get arrested for being a psycho." Writer of the episode, Jesse O'Mahoney, said the note was "designed as [a] window into the casual indifference Max and Tanya had towards Vanessa. It's the lightness of it that eats away at her. Her life, her happiness, destroyed in the face of a flirtatious, throwaway note. It also has a metaphorical element; her rage has been kept on ice and here she explosively pops the cork. But again, without Zöe's performance, it's just a line in a script. [...] [Lucker] throws herself into a frenzied breakdown without reservation. You could imagine her continuing long after the end of the take, rampaging from set to set, tearing down the whole studio. She played the role of Vanessa with such confidence and poise and style that to see her properly lose it, with such authenticity, was a just joyful shock to the system." He said he wished he had thought of Vanessa stabbing the photo frame over and over, adding, "I don't know if that was [Lucker's] idea or the director's but it added a new dimension to her rage."
