= List of EastEnders characters introduced in 2010 =

EastEnders logo

The following are characters who first appeared in the BBC soap opera EastEnders during 2010, listed by order of first appearance. Executive producer Diederick Santer left EastEnders on 26 February 2010, handing over to Bryan Kirkwood, who fully took control from 1 March 2010.

Santer introduced five new main characters in January, three from the online spin-off EastEnders: E20, Zsa Zsa Carter (Emer Kenny), Leon Small (Sam Attwater) and Fatboy (Ricky Norwood), as well as two members of the long-established Mitchell family, Glenda Mitchell, played by Glynis Barber, and her son Danny (Liam Bergin). February saw the show's first birth of 2010, with Kamil Masood, the fourth child of the established Zainab Masood (Nina Wadia) and Masood Ahmed (Nitin Ganatra). The same month, Sandy Gibson (Caroline Pegg/Martha Cope), the mother of Dotty Cotton (Molly Conlin/Milly Zero) appeared. The character of Harvey Freeman, played by Martin Jarvis, was introduced in April, and the fourth main character from EastEnders: E20, Mercy Olubunmi (Bunmi Mojekwu), joined EastEnders in May. Kirkwood's first major casting was Zöe Lucker in the role of Vanessa Gold and later cast her daughter Jodie (Kylie Babbington) and husband Harry (Linal Haft), as well as Mercy's grandmother Grace (Ellen Thomas), all of whom appeared in June. June also saw the show's second birth of the year, that of Lily Branning, the daughter of Stacey Branning (Lacey Turner) and Ryan Malloy (Neil McDermott). In September, Richard Mitchell became the third birth of the year, born to Sam Mitchell (Danniella Westbrook/Kim Medcalf) and Jack Branning (Scott Maslen). Three characters arrived in October: Greg Jessop (Stefan Booth), Tanya Branning's (Jo Joyner) fiancé; Michael Moon (Steve John Shepherd), Alfie Moon's (Shane Richie) cousin; and Julie Perkins (Cathy Murphy), an old friend of Billy Mitchell (Perry Fenwick). In November, Kirkwood introduced Zainab's ex-husband, Yusef Khan (Ace Bhatti). Two more babies were born in December, James Branning and Tommy Moon, which triggered a long-running controversial storyline for Ronnie Branning (Samantha Womack) and Kat Moon (Jessie Wallace).

== Fatima Inzamam ==
Fatima Inzamam
- EastEnders character
- Portrayed by: Uncredited (2010); Anu Hasan (2015)
- Duration: 2010, 2015
- First appearance: Episode 3923; 1 January 2010
- Last appearance: Episode 5169; 6 November 2015
- Introduced by: Diederick Santer (2010); Dominic Treadwell-Collins (2015)
In-universe information
- Husband: Inzamam Ahmed
- Sons: Ali Inzamam
- Daughters: Jamila Inzamam

Fatima Inzamam is the wife of Inzamam Ahmed (Paul Bhattacharjee) and mother of Jamila (Sara Aisha Kent) and Ali (Omar Kent). She made her first screen appearance on 1 January 2010 played by an uncredited actress. Anu Hasan took over the role for Fatima's return from 15 May 2015.

She first appears before Syed Masood's (Marc Elliott) wedding to Amira Shah (Preeya Kalidas) but leaves when Inzamam's brother Masood Ahmed (Nitin Ganatra) tells Inzamam he is no longer welcome at the wedding. In May 2015, Fatima visits after being contacted by her niece Shabnam Masood (Rakhee Thakrar) to find her a husband for an arranged marriage, frustrated at her boyfriend Kush Kazemi's (Davood Ghadami) inability to commit. Fatima invites the suitor, Asim (Nitin Kundra), to the house and introduces him to Shabnam. However, when Shabnam dodges the question of future children, Fatima confronts her, revealing she knows Shabnam abandoned her daughter on her doorstep seven years earlier. She tells Shabnam that she does not keep in touch with the child's adoptive parents but assures her that she is in good health. After Shabnam accepts Kush's proposal, Fatima confesses to Masood that she and Inzamam have separated, he has moved back to Pakistan and that she lied to Shabnam about her daughter; she knows where she is. Fatima later visits again with Shabnam's wedding dress and makes alterations to it to conceal her pregnancy bump.

Fatima is shocked when Shabnam brings up Denise Fox (Diane Parish) and Stacey Slater's (Lacey Turner) past relationships, discovering that Denise's ex-husband, Lucas Johnson (Don Gilet), is a serial killer and that Stacey had an affair with her father-in-law, Max Branning (Jake Wood). Fatima is also shocked to discover Shabnam had been in numerous relationships previously and is unimpressed when Denise, Stacey and Kush's mother Carmel (Bonnie Langford) drink alcohol, worrying about the effect it will have on Masood's reputation. When Carmel questions her relationship with Masood, Fatima is forced to reveal that she is just his sister-in-law, stopping short of revealing that her marriage is over. Once she has finished with Shabnam's dress, Carmel disapproves of the alterations and tells an unimpressed Fatima that Shabnam should not be ashamed to be pregnant, which Shabnam agrees with. Masood later calls Fatima back to the house and she tells him that she felt that she had married the wrong brother. Shabnam then walks in on them kissing and leaves in shock. Fatima is then outraged to discover that Masood had slept with Carmel, and leaves angrily, telling her nephew, Masood's son Tamwar (Himesh Patel), that Masood is just as bad as Inzamam. She returns on the eve of Shabnam and Kush's wedding and helps Shabnam, Carmel, Stacey and Denise with the wedding preparations. She is also present at the wedding ceremony the next day where she meets her new nephew, Masood's youngest son Kamil (Arian Chikhlia), whose mother Zainab Masood (Nina Wadia) has flown out from Pakistan for the occasion.

Laura-Jane Tyler from Inside Soap praised the character, saying "how sweet is Shabnam's Auntie Fatima? Supportive, understanding, calm and reasoned, she's the loving mother the Masood kids never had!"

== Zsa Zsa Carter ==
Zsa Zsa Carter is played by Emer Kenny and made her first appearance on 5 January 2010 before appearing in the Internet spin-off EastEnders: E20. She is one of four characters created for the spin-off who also appear in the main show. Kenny's casting was announced on 25 November 2009. She was cast while writing the second episode of E20. Zsa Zsa is the niece of regular character Shirley Carter (Linda Henry), with whom she is said to have a lot in common. She is described as "Beautiful, funky and an outspoken tomboy," as well as "a lone wolf [who] doesn't care about anyone." Zsa Zsa was axed in May 2010 by new executive producer Bryan Kirkwood, though Kenny continued to write for EastEnders: E20. Her storylines mostly revolve around her relationship with Leon Small (Sam Attwater). The character's last appearance was on 30 September 2010.

== Leon Small ==
Leon Small is played by Sam Attwater and makes his first appearance on 5 January 2010 before appearing in the Internet spin-off EastEnders: E20. He is one of four characters created for the spin-off who also appear in the main show. Attwater's casting was announced on 25 November 2009. Leon is described as "Sexy and effortlessly cool [with] a short fuse and a lack of respect for those in authority." His mother died when he was a child and he was left in charge of his alcoholic father. He also practices boxing. He was axed in May 2010 by new executive producer Bryan Kirkwood. His storylines revolve around his relationships with Zsa Zsa Carter (Emer Kenny) and Lucy Beale (Melissa Suffield). The character's last appearance was on 30 September 2010.

== Fatboy ==
Arthur "Fatboy" Chubb is played by Ricky Norwood and made his first appearance on 5 January 2010 before appearing in the Internet spin-off EastEnders: E20. He is one of four characters created for the spin-off who also appear in the main show. Norwood's casting was announced on 25 November 2009. Fatboy is described as having "invented all manner of personas since he was seven years old—in an attempt to avoid being his real self. His current and most sustained self-creation is brash wheeler-dealer Fatboy." The character left the serial on 24 December 2015.

== Glenda Mitchell ==
Glenda Mitchell is played by Glynis Barber and first appears on 7 January 2010. Jill Gascoine was originally cast as Glenda, but she withdrew during her first day on set and the part was quickly recast to Barber. Glenda has been described as "complex", "vulnerable", "demure, dynamic and assured". She is the former wife of Archie Mitchell (Larry Lamb), and mother to Ronnie (Samantha Womack), Roxy (Rita Simons) and Danny Mitchell (Liam Bergin). She departed on 8 March 2011. Glenda made a brief return to EastEnders on 1 January 2016.

== Danny Mitchell ==
Danny Mitchell is played by soap newcomer Liam Bergin and made his first appearance on 21 January 2010. He is the son of Glenda Mitchell (Glynis Barber) and half brother to Ronnie (Samantha Womack) and Roxy Mitchell (Rita Simons). His arrival and casting were announced on 26 December 2009. The character is described as a "loveable rogue" and "a charmer with an eye for the ladies, while guys instantly see him as competition in the alpha male stakes." He departed the serial on 18 June 2010 after being axed by the new executive producer Bryan Kirkwood. His storylines revolved around his attempts to steal Roxy's inheritance.

== Kamil Masood ==
Kamil Masood
- EastEnders character
- Portrayed by: Arian Chikhlia
- Duration: 2010–2013, 2015–2016
- First appearance: Episode 3954; 23 February 2010
- Last appearance: Episode 5387; 17 November 2016
- Introduced by: Diederick Santer (2010); Dominic Treadwell-Collins (2015)
In-universe information
- Father: Masood Ahmed
- Mother: Zainab Masood
- Stepfather: Yusef Khan
- Brothers: Syed Masood; Tamwar Masood
- Sisters: Shabnam Masood
- Uncles: Inzamam Ahmed; AJ Ahmed
- Nephews: Zaair Kazemi
- Nieces: Yasmin Masood; Jade Masood
- First cousins: Ali Inzamam; Jamila Inzamam
- Other relatives: Arshad Ahmed; Iqra Ahmed; Habiba Ahmed

Kamil Masood, played by Arian Chikhlia, is the son of Masood Ahmed (Nitin Ganatra) and Zainab Masood (Nina Wadia) who is born on screen in the episode broadcast on 23 February 2010, which was set on 19 February 2010.

In August 2009, Zainab is forced to come to terms with the fact that she is 15 weeks pregnant in her mid-40s, and the pregnancy means that her and Masood's plans to see the world have to be cancelled. Zainab is terrified due to her age and the fact a baby will interfere with her career, and she feels trapped because she does not want the baby but abortion is forbidden by her faith.

In February 2010, Zainab becomes locked inside her office unable to contact anyone when her labour starts. She is found by Christian Clarke (John Partridge) who contacts Masood and his two sons Syed (Marc Elliott) and Tamwar (Himesh Patel). Christian calls for an ambulance, but the baby starts to come so Christian passes on instructions while Masood delivers the baby. Kamil is not breathing when he is born, so Christian instructs Masood to perform CPR, saving the infant's life. Zainab is then taken to hospital where she and Masood name their son.

Kamil's parents divorce, and Zainab marries Yusef Khan (Ace Bhatti) soon afterwards. Yusef wants to move to Pakistan and fearful that Zainab will not go with him, he kidnaps Kamil, telling Zainab that he is being kept in a safe place. Yusef later reveals that he has left him with an old friend called Laila. Masood manages to get Laila's address and goes to retrieve Kamil. Laila refuses to let Masood in as Yusef had told her Masood was dead, but Masood forces his way in and takes back his son. Yusef dies soon after and Kamil's parents reunite. When his parents separate again in February 2013, Kamil leaves Walford with his mother to live in Pakistan. Kamil returns at the end of July when Masood brings him back. During this time Kamil bonds with his uncle AJ Ahmed (Phaldut Sharma), and then later leaves again in September and goes back to Pakistan. In November 2015, Zainab sends Kamil to Walford to meet his sister Shabnam (Rakhee Thakrar) for the first time and attend her wedding. Masood later contacts Zainab and refuses her access to Kamil unless she comes back to Walford. In December, Kamil auditions for the lead part of Joseph in the Walford Nativity play, a part which Shabnam is unsure of. When Zainab decides to get remarried she sends for Kamil; Tamwar and his girlfriend Nancy Carter (Maddy Hill) accompany him on the flight to Pakistan before continuing in their travels around the world.

== Sandy Gibson ==
Sandy Gibson
- EastEnders character
- Portrayed by: Caroline Pegg (2010); Martha Cope (2021)
- Duration: 2010, 2021
- First appearance: Episode 3950; 16 February 2010
- Last appearance: Episode 5843; 25 December 2021
- Introduced by: Diederick Santer (2010); Jon Sen (2021)
In-universe information
- Other names: Sandy Cotton
- Daughters: Dotty Cotton

Sandy Gibson, played by Caroline Pegg made her first appearance on 16 February 2010 and departed on 23 February 2010 . In August 2021, it was announced Sandy would be returning to EastEnders with Martha Cope taking over the role. On joining the serial, Cope said: "I have watched EastEnders since it began and I'm beyond excited to join such an iconic show and having a great time playing Sandy." Executive producer Jon Sen added: "Martha is a brilliant addition to our cast – we're excited to welcome her to Walford. To say Sandy has a chequered past is an understatement and it's no secret that Dotty's upbringing was marred by her parents." He said further: "Sandy's arrival catches Dotty off guard and she'll be forced to confront everything she's tried to leave behind."

Sandy is Dotty Cotton's (Molly Conlin) mother. She turns up at Dot Branning's (June Brown) house looking for her daughter, Kirsty, but Dot says she knows nobody of that name. Dot and Sandy meet up in the café and Sandy says she was an alcoholic but gave up the day Dotty's father Nick Cotton (John Altman) took her away. Dot later decides to tell Dotty about her mother, who wants to see her. After Sandy visits Dotty, Dot decides that she should live with her mother. Dotty receives an emotional send-off from Dot as she and Sandy leave the Square. In October 2010 during a conversation with Grace Olubunmi (Ellen Thomas), Dot refers to Sandy as her daughter-in-law, suggesting that Sandy is or once was married to Nick.

In October 2021, eleven years later, Sandy returns and gatecrashes a private party at Ruby Allen's (Louisa Lytton) nightclub and ordered to leave by Vinny Panesar (Shiv Jalota). Sandy refuses to and she is bounced by club security. Sonia Fowler (Natalie Cassidy) finds Sandy drunk in the street, demanding to see Dotty (now played by Milly Zero). Sandy then returns to the club and causes a commotion, much to Dotty's shock. An argument ensues, where Sandy berates Dotty and Dotty discovers needle tracks on her arms, confirming she is using again. When Dotty asks Sandy what she wants, she tells her she wants money.

Dotty attempts to settle Sandy into one of Suki Panesar's (Balvinder Sopal) properties, but Suki evicts her. Meanwhile, Dotty's long-lost uncle Tom 'Rocky' Cotton (Brian Conley), who is deceitfully posing as Sonia's father, is horrified to discover that Sandy is back and demands Dotty make her leave.

On Christmas Day, Dotty reveals the truth about Rocky's identity. However, this does not go down well with Sandy who fears that Dotty has ruined their plan to extort money. Sandy angrily tells Dotty that Rocky is actually her father, and not Nick. A devastated Dotty asks Sandy if she is telling the truth but Sandy leaves. In September 2022, Dotty confronts Rocky, who says that he can't be her father, as he and Sandy never had sex and that Nick is actually her dad, proving that Sandy was lying.

In 2022, Laura-Jayne Tyler from Inside Soap called Sandy "chaotic" and called for her return, writing that there was huge "storyline potential" for her and Dotty that was being wasted.

== Kylie ==
Kylie
- EastEnders character
- Portrayed by: Elarica Gallacher
- First appearance: Episode 3955; 24 February 2010
- Last appearance: Episode 3974/3975; 1 April 2010
- Introduced by: Diederick Santer

Kylie, played by Elarica Gallacher, is a friend of Billie Jackson's (Devon Anderson) from his housing estate in Balham. Kylie appears between 24 February and 1 April, along with her fellow gang members Connor Stanley (Arinze Kene) and Mitch Gannon (Theo Barklem-Biggs).

Billie returns to Balham with Whitney Dean (Shona McGarty) and Kylie tells him he belongs with his crew. The next week, Whitney goes there looking for Billie, and when she meets Kylie, she insults her and Kylie and her friends attack her, telling her to ask Billie for their gun back. They later arrive in Albert Square and apologise to Whitney, and Billie insists he has disposed of the gun. Kylie and Connor turn up at a grime night at The Queen Victoria public house where Kylie gets Whitney drunk, insults Peggy Mitchell (Barbara Windsor) and throws drink over her. Outside, Connor sprays graffiti on a bench and then Kylie and Connor run off, leaving Whitney and Billie to suffer the consequences. Kylie, Connor and Mitch return a few weeks later and take Billie for drinks where they are told to leave by Phil Mitchell (Steve McFadden). The gang decide to rob the pub using a fake gun, and they get away with the money. Billie then realises the real gun that he hid has gone missing after Kylie found it earlier. Kylie tells Billie he must choose between the gang or Whitney. Billie chooses Whitney, so Kylie takes revenge by trying to shoot him during a family party. However, Jack Branning (Scott Maslen) is the one who is shot, and Kylie is tackled by a club employee. The next day, Connor arrives looking for Billie, and reveals that Kylie has been arrested. Several months later, she is sentenced to 15 years in prison.

The storyline was criticised by Ruth Deller of lowculture.co.uk, calling it flawed and unrepresentative of the real Balham, and describing Kylie as an "irritant". A writer on website Balham People expanded on this, saying that the writers had not researched Balham properly. An EastEnders spokesperson responded, saying "Although some of Billie's friends or associates are from Balham we have never implied the area had a problem with gangs". The Balham People writer feared that viewers who do not know the area would make "subconscious erroneous judgements almost by osmosis."

== Connor Stanley ==
Connor Stanley
- EastEnders character
- Portrayed by: Arinze Kene
- Duration: 2010–2011
- First appearance: Episode 3957; 1 March 2010
- Last appearance: Episode 4178; 15 March 2011
- Introduced by: Diederick Santer
In-universe information
- Occupation: Mechanic
- Mother: Kendra Stanley

Connor Stanley, played by Arinze Kene, is a friend of Billie Jackson's (Devon Anderson) from his housing estate in Balham. He appears between 1 March and 2 April along with his fellow gang members Kylie (Elarica Gallacher) and Mitch Gannon (Theo Barklem-Biggs). Connor appears again from 8 October 2010 until 24 January 2011, and again on 15 March 2011.

When Whitney Dean (Shona McGarty) goes to Balham looking for Billie, Connor and the rest of the gang attack her. They later arrive in Albert Square and apologise to Whitney, and Billie insists he has disposed of the gun they wanted back. Kylie and Connor turn up at a grime night at The Queen Victoria public house where Connor steals a bottle of tequila. Outside, he sprays graffiti on a bench and then Kylie and Connor run off, leaving Whitney and Billie to suffer the consequences. Kylie, Connor and Mitch return a few weeks later and take Billie for drinks where they are told to leave by Phil Mitchell (Steve McFadden). The gang decide to rob the pub using a fake gun, and they get away with the money. Billie then realises the real gun that he hid has gone missing after Kylie found it earlier. Kylie tells Billie he must choose between the gang or Whitney. Billie chooses Whitney, so Kylie takes revenge by trying to shoot him during a family party. However, Jack Branning (Scott Maslen) is the one who is shot. The next day, Connor arrives looking for Billie, and reveals that Kylie has been arrested.

Months later, Connor arrives at Billie's birthday party with four friends who bring plenty of alcohol. The next morning, after everyone has left, Billie is found dead. The next week, Billie's mother Carol Jackson (Lindsey Coulson) visits Connor in Balham, who says he has heard that Billie died. Carol rants at him, blaming him for Billie's death, and bans him from the funeral. She tells him she hopes one day he loses a child so he will know how she feels. Connor, Mitch and the rest of the gang arrive for Billie's funeral but Carol bans all of them. As the hearse passes, they remove their hoods and masks as a mark of respect. After the funeral, Connor goes to Carol's, angry that she banned him. However, he realises she is about to attempt suicide and tells her it will not work. They both break down about Billie and comfort each other, which leads to them having sex. However, they are interrupted and Connor leaves. At Kylie's sentencing, Connor sees Carol and compliments her on her new hair, and asks if she would come back to his. However, Jack interrupts and tells Connor to watch out as he has a score to settle. As Carol walks away, Connor apologises and says he will leave her alone. Kylie is then sentenced to 15 years in prison.

When Carol receives Billie's ashes, she takes them to Connor to ask him where Billie might have wanted them scattered. Connor reveals he has nowhere to live so Carol invites him to move in with her and Glenda Mitchell (Glynis Barber). They then start a sexual relationship, and Connor starts stealing cars for Phil Mitchell (Steve McFadden). Carol kicks him out after finding cannabis in the flat. However, it is Glenda's and Carol tries to call Connor to ask him to move back in. Carol's daughter Bianca Butcher (Patsy Palmer) still does not trust Connor however, and accuses him of manipulating her mother. Carol defends Connor, but then finds out that he is in possession of stolen jewellery, and throws him out again. Connor is handling the jewellery for Phil, and returns to Walford to pay for a delivery of it. Jay Brown (Jamie Borthwick) meets him with the jewellery, but Connor under-pays him and threatens him not to tell Phil. However Jay then confronts him again and beats him up, retrieving the cash owed in the process. Connor meets up with Whitney and flirts with her. He also asks her to help him sell the stolen jewellery, which she agrees to. However, Phil's partner Shirley Carter (Linda Henry) buys it and Phil finds out. He tells Connor to sell it by the end of the week. Connor then gives it back to Whitney to look after but Bianca finds it and dumps it down a drain. Bianca tells Phil that Connor should pay, so Phil beats Connor, but is interrupted by Carol. She takes Connor back to her flat where Connor admits he was only with Whitney to make Carol jealous, and they start kissing. They start their relationship again in secret, and spend New Year's Eve together. Connor also starts working for Phil at his garage and starts seeing Whitney behind Carol's back. When it is revealed that Connor has been sleeping with both Carol and Whitney, Bianca attacks Connor with a metal pipe, leaving him hospitalised. Carol visits Connor in hospital but his mother Kendra (Sharon D. Clarke) arrives and tells Carol to go home and leave Connor alone, and Connor tells Carol he now has his mother and does not need her.

Carol pays Connor a visit after Whitney goes missing to see if he knows where she is. He is pleased to see her but she realises she was only with him because of her grief over Billie. He tries to make a move on her but she rejects him. The incident gives Carol closure and she is able to scatter Billie's ashes.

=== Reception ===
The original storyline was criticised by Ruth Deller of lowculture.co.uk, calling it flawed and unrepresentative of the real Balham. A writer on website Balham People expanded on this, saying that the writers had not researched Balham properly. An EastEnders spokesperson responded, saying "Although some of Billie's friends or associates are from Balham we have never implied the area had a problem with gangs". The Balham People writer feared that viewers who do not know the area would make "subconscious erroneous judgements almost by osmosis." A number of viewers complained about Connor's comment—"Do I look like that skinny white boy?"—made in 13 December 2010 episode about Peter Beale (Thomas Law), feeling that it was racist. The BBC responded, saying "[It] was simply a description—and an accurate one at that—of Peter Beale. It was not intended to be a racist insult in any way."

Kene revealed in January 2011 that his role in the soap has meant he is recognised by fans on a daily basis. In February 2011, Kene was nominated for Best Newcomer at the All About Soap Bubble Awards for his portrayal of Connor. In October 2011, Kene was nominated for two awards at the Screen Nation Awards, which celebrate the best British Black talent. He was nominated for the Favourite Male TV Star and the Emerging Talent award.

== Harvey Freeman ==
Harvey Freeman
- EastEnders character
- Portrayed by: Martin Jarvis
- First appearance: Episode 3983; 15 April 2010
- Last appearance: Episode 4012; 3 June 2010
- Introduced by: Diederick Santer
In-universe information
- Occupation: Freelance journalist

Harvey Freeman is a freelance journalist, played by Martin Jarvis. He appears between 15 April and 3 June 2010. He is described as a mysterious 60-something and a perfect gent who arrives to report on local elections for Walford Gazette, and is said to be a potential love interest for characters Peggy Mitchell (Barbara Windsor) and Pat Evans (Pam St Clement). Jarvis said on his casting: "I'm absolutely thrilled to be a potential thorn between two roses working with two actresses I greatly admire and have had the pleasure of working with before. I'm delighted to be reunited with Pam and Barbara and to have a part in EastEnders."

He arrives in The Queen Victoria public house to interview Peggy on the upcoming council elections in which she is running. He later interviews Pat for the same reason, but Peggy plies them with free drinks and Pat gets drunk. Peggy tells Harvey that Pat cheated on her husband with Peggy's husband, and that anything she has said about the Mitchell family is a lie. After Pat pours a drink on Peggy's head, Harvey announces that he has more candidates to interview and leaves, after wiping Peggy's face. After hearing that Pat and Peggy have both chosen to withdraw from the election, Harvey visits them individually, giving them his card and inviting them out for drinks. A week later, they both decide to call him on the same day. He takes Pat out for lunch and Peggy out for dinner without them knowing he is seeing them both. The next day he tries his best to stop them finding out but eventually they realise what he has been doing, so he quickly leaves. Pat and Peggy argue over him but eventually agree not to let him come between their friendship. They tell him so and tell him to get out in unison. Later, Harvey talks to Pat and she asks who he would have chosen if he had to choose. He says Pat as he prefers a more intelligent woman. He then waits for Peggy and she asks him the same question, to which he says he would have chosen Peggy as he prefers a woman with class. Pat and Peggy meet again and agree they did the right thing, but then both their mobile phones receive text messages at the same time and they walk away from each other smiling.

Harvey spends time with Pat while Peggy is away but when Peggy returns he invites her to the theatre. She says she cannot make it so Harvey invites Pat who agrees. Peggy later says she can come but Harvey says he has given the tickets to someone else. Peggy buys tickets of her own and Pat and Peggy both turn up at the theatre together, and Harvey's face drops when he sees them both. He explains that they are at fault for not telling each other they were seeing him. Pat and Peggy begin to argue so Harvey leaves and escapes onto a tour bus. Pat and Peggy catch him up and take over the tour guide's microphone, saying that Harvey is vermin and slapping him before they get off. Harvey returns to Walford to explain that he wants to carry on seeing them both, but if it can only be as friends then so be it. When he goes to the toilet, Pat reveals that she has slept with Harvey and Peggy reveals that she has not. They realise he is just trying to get as much sex as he can and plan to humiliate him. Pat leaves Peggy and Harvey alone and Peggy says that night she was going to sleep with Harvey and they could still do so. He goes upstairs and Peggy steals his clothes. When he comes downstairs, Pat and Peggy are waiting and they tell him to leave after Pat throws his clothes out the door. Harvey has a sheet around him but Pat snatches it off him before he leaves humiliated.

== Mercy Olubunmi ==
Mercy Olubunmi is played by Bunmi Mojekwu. Mercy originally appears in the Internet spin-off series EastEnders: E20 as one of the main characters, alongside Zsa Zsa Carter (Emer Kenny), Leon Small (Sam Attwater) and Fatboy (Ricky Norwood), between 8 and 25 January 2010, however, she was the only character from the spin-off to not feature in EastEnders. Mojekwu's casting was announced on 25 November 2009, and It was subsequently announced on 24 January 2010 that she would feature in EastEnders due to positive reaction to the character. Executive producer Diederick Santer said that once he had seen the completed episodes of EastEnders: E20, he wanted Mercy in the main show as well. She is described as "funny, warm, sensitive and rather mysterious." She has always been a good girl but she feels abandoned when her parents move back to Nigeria, leaving her with her grandmother, Grace (Ellen Thomas). She first appears in EastEnders on 31 May. Her storylines include suffering a miscarriage after discovering she is pregnant by her local church's youth minister, Benjamin (Damien Lynch), and facing deportation back to Nigeria. She left EastEnders on 12 July 2011.

== Grace Olubunmi ==
Grace Olubunmi
- EastEnders character
- Portrayed by: Ellen Thomas (2010–2011); Jay Byrd (EastEnders: E20)
- Duration: 2010–2011
- First appearance: Episode 4013; 4 June 2010
- Last appearance: Episode 4286; 20 September 2011
- Introduced by: Diederick Santer and Bryan Kirkwood
- Spin-off appearances: EastEnders: E20 (2010–2011)
In-universe information
- Occupation: Retired teacher Launderette worker
- Granddaughters: Mercy Olubunmi; Faith Olubunmi

Grace Olubunmi is the grandmother of Mercy Olubunmi (Bunmi Mojekwu). She appears in episode 8 of the first series of EastEnders spin-off EastEnders: E20, credited only as Mrs. Olubunmi and played by Jay Byrd. New executive producer Bryan Kirkwood introduced the character to EastEnders in his first episode on 4 June 2010, this time played by Ellen Thomas. She also appeared in series 3 of E20 along with Mercy's younger sister, Faith Olubunmi, who Grace sent to Nigeria to get back on the straight and narrow, but she returns to the UK and is worse than ever.

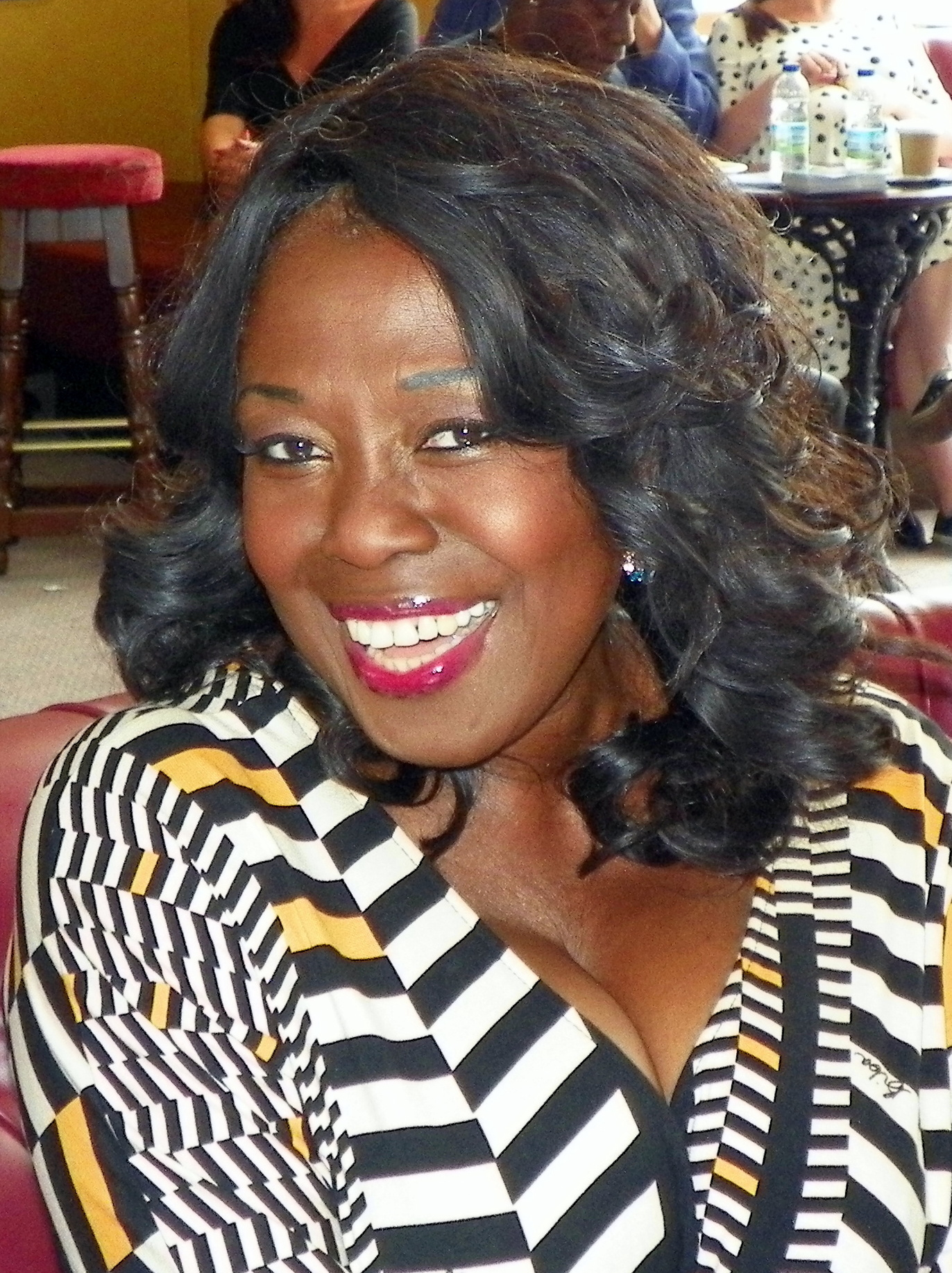
Grace is portrayed by Ellen Thomas, marking her third of four roles in the series.

In EastEnders: E20, Grace tells Mercy that her friend Fatboy (Ricky Norwood) is a bad influence on her. When the character arrives in EastEnders, she urges Mercy to tell Fatboy that they are moving to Lagos. She makes friends with Liz Turner (Kate Williams), mother of Owen Turner (Lee Ross) and later tells Fatboy about their plans. She hosts a lunch at the community centre and tells Lucas Johnson (Don Gilet) that she has grown fond of London but is going to Lagos for Mercy's sake. Fatboy then realises that neither Grace nor Mercy want to go and makes them realise this after Mercy has returned the key to their former home. Fatboy then says he has a plan for somewhere for them to live, and they move into a property on Albert Square. Grace attends a bible class with Mercy, held by Lucas. She apologises for Mercy's behaviour when she continues to ask about false prophets and a passage that states that anyone who questions a priest should be put to death, causing Lucas to leave. Grace makes Mercy write Lucas a letter of apology, but Mercy bins it.

Upset with the amount of litter around the streets, she urges Mercy and Fatboy to volunteer to pick it up. She takes Mercy's friends, Zsa Zsa Carter (Emer Kenny) and Leon Small (Sam Attwater), to get their GCSE results and says she used to be a teacher. The next month Leon breaks one of her commemorative plates and Fatboy tries to create a new one in the hope Grace will think it is real, but she does not fall for it. However, she praises Fatboy for his eventual honesty and displays the plate with her others. However, when she discovers Mercy has been serving drinks in Alfie Moon's (Shane Richie) illegal den, she berates her granddaughter and says Fatboy has corrupted her. Grace overhears Dot Branning (June Brown) planning to collect jumble for her church. Grace collects the jumble instead, leaving Dot upset. They quote bible passages to each other to try to show who is in the right, but Grace later admits that she is lonely and just wanted to meet new people. The next day, Mercy tries to get Grace and Dot to make up, by suggesting Grace work in the launderette. Grace puts some shirts in a broken washing machine, which annoys Dot, and after Grace gets it open Dot is still not happy. Grace later gives Dot her CV to give to her boss, and Dot says there is not a job for her but Grace tells her that Jesus disagrees.

The next day, Grace asks Dot if she has looked at her CV yet. Dot says Grace is overqualified as she used to be a teacher. Grace says she will not be teaching again as she was dismissed from her last job. Later, Dot finds a tin of cakes in the launderette with a note from Grace saying it was not about the job. Dot visits Grace and offers her a few weeks work while Dot is away. Grace feels honoured, and tells Dot she was dismissed for slapping a pupil. Dot thanks her for her honesty. However, when Dot joins a local choir that Grace is a member of, the pair start quarrelling again, as Dot is unimpressed with the singing standard of the group. She later holidays in her native Nigeria but returns in time for the wedding of Prince William and Catherine Middleton. She does not watch the wedding, however, as Mercy is leaving because she faces deportation. Grace and Mercy say goodbye to each other but as Mercy's taxi drives off, Fatboy stops it and asks Mercy to marry him. Grace is opposed to the idea at first, until she realises that Fatboy loves Mercy.

After Mercy and Fatboy's wedding, Grace attends Mercy's hearing and is annoyed that they will not get a decision over whether she can stay in the country straight away. Mercy is allowed to stay in the UK but decides to leave anyway over guilt at her deception. Grace waves Mercy off as she leaves in the back of a black cab. Two days later Grace worries when Fatboy does not come home, and finds he stayed with Dot. Fatboy later tells Grace that he will be living with Dot as Grace's house holds too many memories of Mercy. Grace is surprised when Mercy's sister Faith Olubunmi (Modupe Adeyeye) arrives from Nigeria and moves in with her. Faith later holds a party at Grace's house and she has sex with Fatboy but they are caught by Grace. The next day, when Faith returns home drunk, Grace slaps her and kicks her out of the house. Following this, Grace makes appearances in EastEnders: E20, where Faith continues to ask her for a place to stay, but Grace refuses. Grace is also upset when Lola Pearce (Danielle Harold), Abi Branning (Lorna Fitzgerald) and Ben Mitchell (Joshua Pascoe) prank call her and then break her hanging basket. When Faith returns home drunk, Grace slaps her telling her to leave. Although Grace is not seen on-screen after this, she still lives locally and is mentioned on occasion. In April 2013, Max Branning (Jake Wood) informs his wife Kirsty (Kierston Wareing) that Grace has left Walford to move back to Nigeria, and that her flat is for sale. Ava Hartman (Clare Perkins) also likes the flat, and eventually buys it, before Max and Kirsty. Grace is not mentioned since.

Mercy and Grace's introduction to EastEnders made them the first Nigerian family to appear in the series. Mojekwu, who plays Mercy, was surprised at how long it took the programme to represent her community in the series, but congratulated them for doing so. On the announcement of Mojekwu's departure, it was revealed that Mercy's family would remain in the series. Bryan Kirkwood confirmed this. In October 2011, Thomas received a special mention at the Screen Nation Awards, which celebrate the best British Black talent.

== Vanessa Gold ==
Vanessa Gold, played by Zöe Lucker, is a businesswoman who is described as "dynamic and assured" and is a love interest for Max Branning (Jake Wood). The character first appears on 4 June. She was created by Simon Ashdown. Lucker's initial contract was for seven episodes, but this was extended and Vanessa became a regular character. She is the mother of Jodie (Kylie Babbington) and wife of Harry (Linal Haft). It was announced in April 2011 that Lucker was to depart from the series and would have an "explosive" departure. Vanessa was introduced as a love-interest for local car salesman Max, intended to facilitate a reunion between Max and his former wife Tanya (Jo Joyner). Concurrent to their romance, which was extended to span Lucker's increased tenure, Vanessa separates from her controlling husband Harry, and reveals that he is not the father of her teenage daughter Jodie. Lucker describes Vanessa as a glamorous risk-taker, who does not fit into the soap's Albert Square setting. She received critical praise for her comic timing in the role, and was nominated Most Popular Newcomer at the 2010 Inside Soap Awards. She departed on 6 October 2011.

== Jodie Gold ==
Jodie Gold, played by Kylie Babbington, is Vanessa Gold's (Zöe Lucker) daughter. The character was announced on 10 May 2010 and first appeared on screen on 7 June 2010 when she arrived in the show's setting of Albert Square in Walford looking for her mother. She is a love interest for Darren Miller (Charlie G. Hawkins) and is described as big-hearted with "an infectious smile and a personality to match." Executive producer Bryan Kirkwood told entertainment website Digital Spy, "I'm really excited about Kylie taking on the role of Jodie. She brings yet more fresh energy to the show—she's a ray of sunshine." The character is 19 years old on her arrival and Jodie is Babbington's first television role. Jodie left the series on 14 November 2011.

== Jade ==
Jade
- EastEnders character
- Portrayed by: Niamh Webb
- First appearance: Episode 4015; 8 June 2010
- Last appearance: Episode 4018/4019; 15 June 2010
- Introduced by: Bryan Kirkwood

Jade, played by Niamh Webb, is a character which meets Lucas Johnson (Don Gilet) and appears in the episodes broadcast on 8, 9 and 15 June 2010. Jade first appears when Lucas visits a bar and sees her on her own. He offers to take her somewhere more quiet and they leave together. He takes her to a secluded spot and tells her that drinking and throwing herself at men is wrong and that her soul is lost. He says she needs to be cleansed and forces her to pray, but she attempts to fight back. She escapes but Lucas catches up to her, again telling her to beg for God's forgiveness. Lucas then removes his tie, and when he returns home, there are deep scratch marks on his neck. Jade's fate is unknown until Lucas's wife Denise (Diane Parish) suspects Lucas is cheating on her, so Lucas takes her to see where he got the scratches. They go to Jade's flat where she tells Denise that she prayed with Lucas and he baptised her, though initially she tried to resist and scratched Lucas. She says she will get help for her alcohol dependence and get her daughter back, who was taken away from her.

Jade was originally scripted as a prostitute who Lucas picks up and forces to pray for forgiveness before apparently strangling her. However, following the charging of Stephen Griffiths with the murder of three prostitutes in Bradford, the decision was made to reshoot the scenes to remove the prostitute references, less than a week before the scenes were due to air. A spokesperson for the programme said the decision was made to "ensure we do not cause distress to the families involved in these tragic events."

== Harry Gold ==
Harry Gold
- EastEnders character
- Portrayed by: Linal Haft
- Duration: 2010–2011
- First appearance: Episode 4023; 23 June 2010
- Last appearance: Episode 4274; 30 August 2011
- Created by: Simon Ashdown
- Introduced by: Bryan Kirkwood
In-universe information
- Occupation: Businessman
- Wife: Vanessa Gold (1990 -2011)
- Stepdaughters: Jodie Gold

Harry Gold, played by Linal Haft, is Vanessa Gold's (Zöe Lucker) husband and stepfather to Jodie (Kylie Babbington). The character was announced on 15 June 2010 and appears from 23 June. He was created by Simon Ashdown and was described by Kris Green from entertainment website Digital Spy as being controlling and similar to the character Archie Mitchell (Larry Lamb). He left on 9 November 2010, and returned again on 29 August 2011.

Harry first appears when Vanessa returns home from seeing Max Branning (Jake Wood). He asks her for a drink and then says he smells cigarette smoke on her. She lies that she was out with friends but he says one of her friends called earlier that day and has not seen Vanessa for weeks. Vanessa then says she went out on her own as she could not face being bored at home, and admits to smoking, which Harry dislikes. He wonders if she is seeing someone else, and after he watches Vanessa go upstairs to bed, he moves an ornament back to where it was before Vanessa moved it when she came home. He comes to Walford several weeks later, looking for Max. He asks Liam Butcher (James Forde) and his younger half-brother, Morgan (Devon Higgs) if he knows Max. Liam tells him where he lives, and Harry gives them some money. However, he mistakes Darren Miller (Charlie G. Hawkins) for him and knees him in the groin, telling him to keep off his property, leaving Darren in immense pain as he has just returned from having a circumcision operation. He takes Vanessa to Walford and dumps her bags outside Max's house, realises who Max really is, and asks Vanessa what Max has that he does not, to which she says he can manage sex more than once a week. Harry says they are welcome to each other and leaves, taking Vanessa's car.

However, when Jodie reveals to Vanessa that Harry is heartbroken, Vanessa ends her affair with Max and moves back to Chigwell. Harry then comes to Walford with Vanessa and Jodie to meet Darren. At Vanessa's birthday party, Max's ex-wife Tanya (Jo Joyner) tells Vanessa that Max misses her and she should go back to him. Jodie sees that Harry is not very interested in celebrating Vanessa's birthday and tells her mother that she agrees with Tanya as Vanessa deserves better than Harry, so Vanessa goes back to Max again.

Harry attempts to contact Vanessa but she continues to ignore him as it is Billie Jackson's (Devon Anderson) funeral. He sends Vicky Saunders (Jessica Ellerby) to issue Vanessa with some papers but she sends her away. Harry later turns up at Vanessa's house and hands her the papers, revealing that he wants Vanessa to get nothing in their divorce. He also threatens her with Jodie, saying he can get her to take his side, saying she has always been a daddy's girl, but Vanessa reveals he is not her father. In spite, Harry spray-paints the word "slapper" on Max's door, and plasters Walford with nude photos of Vanessa. When Darren catches Harry about to spray-paint a car, he stops him and Harry tells him that he is not Jodie's father. Later, Darren begs Harry not to tells Jodie but when Jodie says Harry phoned her, Darren assumes he told her and accidentally reveals the truth.

Vanessa meets Harry and he says he will do anything to hurt Vanessa, even keeping Jodie from her despite no longer feeling anything for her. He takes Vanessa's jewellery and calls her a prostitute, saying that he will let Jodie stay with her if they have sex. Harry takes revenge by throwing a brick through Max and Vanessa's window and slashing the tyres of the cars on Max's car lot. Jodie's cat goes missing and while everyone looks for it, Harry slashes Vanessa's clothes, and when she goes to throw them away, she finds the cat dead in the bin. Max and his brother Jack (Scott Maslen) then decide to take revenge on Harry. They send Harry a text message from Vanessa's phone asking to meet, and when he turns up, they threaten him and tell him to never contact Vanessa again or next time it will be worse. After they all go their separate ways, Jack is grabbed by two men and bundled into a car. Jack is later released, but reveals to Max that Harry was behind the kidnapping.

Nine months later, Vanessa contacts Harry in need of money to pay for Jodie and Darren's wedding. Harry agrees so he can make amends with Jodie, as long as Vanessa does not attend. However, Darren overhears this and reveals it to Jodie. Darren tells Harry to leave and he does so telling Darren that he and Jodie will not make it down the aisle.

== Ricky Branning ==
Ricky Branning
- EastEnders character
- Portrayed by: Uncredited (2010); Henri Charles (2016–2018); Frankie Day (2018–present)
- Duration: 2010, 2016–present
- First appearance: Episode 4063; 2 September 2010
- Introduced by: Bryan Kirkwood (2010); Dominic Treadwell-Collins (2016)
In-universe information
- Other names: Richard Branning; Ricky Mitchell
- Family: Branning/Mitchell
- Father: Jack Branning
- Mother: Sam Mitchell
- Stepmother: Ronnie Mitchell; Denise Fox
- Half-brothers: James Branning
- Half-sisters: Amy Mitchell; Penny Branning
- Daughters: Charli Slater
- Grandfathers: Eric Mitchell; Jim Branning
- Grandmothers: Peggy Mitchell; Reenie Branning
- Uncles: Phil Mitchell; Grant Mitchell; Derek Branning; Max Branning
- Aunts: Carol Jackson; Suzy Branning; April Branning
- Nephews: Ethan Branning-Panesar
- First cousins: Ben Mitchell; Mark Fowler Jnr; Courtney Mitchell; Louise Mitchell; Raymond Fox; Albie Watts; Joey Branning; Alice Branning; Bradley Branning; Lauren Branning; Abi Branning; Oscar Branning; Annie Carter; Bianca Jackson; Robbie Jackson; Sonia Fowler; Billie Jackson; Kevin; Rebecca
- Other relatives: Aunt Sal; Stevie Mitchell; Archie Mitchell; Clive Mitchell; Billy Mitchell; Teddy Mitchell; Harry Mitchell; Jamie Mitchell; Ronnie Mitchell; Roxy Mitchell; Danielle Jones; Matthew Mitchell Cotton; Janet Mitchell; Will Mitchell; Liam Butcher; Tiffany Butcher; Morgan Butcher; Bex Fowler; Julia Fowler; Sami Jackson; Lola Pearce; Lexi Pearce; Louie Beale; Jimmy Beale; AJ Branning

Richard "Ricky" Branning (also Mitchell) is the son of Sam Mitchell (Danniella Westbrook/Kim Medcalf) and Jack Branning (Scott Maslen), born in the episode broadcast on 2 September 2010. Sam becomes pregnant after having an affair with Jack while in a relationship with Ricky Butcher (Sid Owen). The character's appearances as a baby in 2010 are uncredited. He returned in 2016 played by Henri Charles. Two years later, Ricky was recast to Frankie Day, who made his debut in the episode broadcast on 13 August 2018.

At first, Sam (Danniella Westbrook), wants to put Richard up for adoption but her mother Peggy Mitchell (Barbara Windsor) insists she keep him, saying Richard is the only way Sam can get back with Ricky Butcher (Sid Owen), who is now remarried to Bianca Jackson (Patsy Palmer). Peggy promises to help raise Richard, but she leaves Walford, leaving Sam alone. Sam insists that Ricky is Richard's father but Bianca orders a paternity test to be sure. Sam tells them the result is positive for Ricky, but Bianca double checks and discovers it is her uncle Jack Branning (Scott Maslen), and when she confronts Sam, she reveals that her cousin and Jack's fiancée, Ronnie (Samantha Womack), pressured her into lying. When Sam feels that she is struggling to cope, she asks Jack and Ronnie to take Richard. They agree and make plans for Sam to bring Richard and his belongings over to Jack and Ronnie; Sam does not arrive, so Jack and Ronnie visit her. Ronnie goes in and asks Sam to think it through, as she can see that Sam is more attached to Richard than she is willing to admit. Ronnie offers her money to leave Walford with Richard, as when Jack finds out she is keeping Richard, he will come after her. Ronnie leaves alone, but Sam leaves Richard with Jack without Ronnie's knowledge. Later, Ronnie and Sam meet, and she gives Sam the money, telling her to take Richard back and leave. Sam takes Richard and emigrates to Portugal to live with her brother, Grant (Ross Kemp) in September 2010.

Richard, now nicknamed Ricky (Henri Charles), returns to Walford with Sam for Peggy's funeral in June 2016 and when Jack sees him, he refuses to have anything to do with him. However, Jack later decides that he wants to get to know Ricky, who is left at Jack's house to bond with him and Jack's daughter Amy (Abbie Burke). Deciding he is better off without her, Sam secretly abandons Ricky, leaving him with Jack, and goes back to Portugal without telling anybody. Realising Sam has allowed Ricky to do what he wants, Jack attempts to get him to end his bad habits of eating sweets and constantly playing video games by giving him healthy meals, throwing his games console in the bin and encouraging him to join scouts. Ricky shuts himself in a cupboard and when he comes out, he says he dislikes being called "Richard" and then attends Scouts. On New Year's Day 2017, during Jack and Ronnie's wedding night, both Ronnie, her sister and Amy's mother Roxy Mitchell (Rita Simons) drown in a hotel swimming pool. Jack initially does not want Amy or Ricky to know, but when they start asking questions about their whereabouts, Jack says they have "gone away" and are never coming back. Ricky and Amy are left confused, so continue to question Jack and his brother Max Branning (Jake Wood) until their stepmother Dot Branning (June Brown) explains to them with sensitivity that they have died.

In April 2022, Sam (now played by Kim Medcalf) returns to Walford on business and tries to reignite her relationship with Ricky (now Frankie Day), much to the opposition of Jack and his civil partner Denise Fox (Diane Parish). Initially, Ricky is frosty towards Sam for abandoning him six years ago, but soon comes around when she takes him out of school and brings him to the local gay bar, The Prince Albert, for a meal without Jack's knowledge. Sam decides to stick around in Walford and proceeds to blackmail Jack into letting her stay with him and Denise, so she can be closer to Ricky. After many conflicts at Jack's house, Sam moves in with her older brother Phil (Steve McFadden) and his fiancée Kat Slater (Jessie Wallace). Following a public brawl with Kat and Phil's former wife Sharon Watts (Letitia Dean), Phil kicks Sam out and Jack offers her accommodation in one of his flats so she does not have to leave Ricky again. Whilst Jack and Denise are preoccupied with Amy (now played by Ellie Dadd) when she begins self-harming, Ricky starts slipping away to "see friends".

In January 2023, Ricky is revealed to be the father of twelve-year-old Lily Slater's (Lillia Turner) unborn baby following a one-night stand. Lily later tells him, resulting in Ricky blurting it out to Sam. Sam then tells Jack and Denise, angering Ricky. Jack and Sam accompany Ricky to the police station to answer questions about his relationship with Lily. After agreeing to start a new life in Germany with her former husband Ricky Butcher (Sid Owen), Sam then changes her mind and decides to remain in Walford to support her son. Ricky later tells Lily that he will support her and the baby. Sam, Jack and Denise pay a visit to the Slaters and berate Lily's mother Stacey Slater (Lacey Turner) and her stepfather Martin Fowler (James Bye) for their refusal to have Lily's pregnancy terminated. Stacey tells them that it is Lily's choice. Sam explains that they have rights over the decision too. Jack intervenes by trying to manipulate Lily into changing her mind by scaring her about the prospects of parenthood. Lily then tells Stacey, resulting in Stacey furiously banning the Brannings and Mitchells from having anything to do with Lily's baby.

Due to this Ricky decides to move in with Sam, who convinces Jack to allow her and Ricky to move into 5D Albert Square. At the gender reveal, Lily and Ricky are delighted to announce they are having a daughter. When Ricky learns his mother Sam has chosen to take a job managing a hotel in Spain, Ricky is hurt and pushes his mother away by telling her he would not care if she leaves, refusing to go to her leaving party organised for Sam by Honey before Sam leaves Ricky decides to reconcile with his mother thanks to Amy talking about how she doesn't have her mother anymore. Ricky and Sam part on good terms Ricky telling his mum he loves her and Sam saying she isn't abandoning him this time and she will call him every day and is coming back and that when Ricky daughter is born she will be his world like Ricky is Sam's. Due to Sam leaving for Spain Ricky has moved back in with his dad full time.

A week later Denise revealed to Jack what has been happening with her and Ravi and how that is causing Amy to act out again. Ricky finds out and is mad at Denise because he told his mum to leave as he thought if she did he would still have Denise. The next morning Ricky finds out Denise and Raymond have moved out due to Jack finding out about Ravi and Denise and it fracturing their relationship and by extension their family unit. Ricky believes that Denise and Jack are getting divorced due to everything that's happened Amy does not share this and tries to force Jack and Denise back together which has disastrous results. Later on Ricky, Amy, Denise and Jack go to Family therapy the morning of Jack looks at Family photo on his laptop Amy is trying to do touch therapy with her necklace that broke and Ricky looks at a picture of his daughters scan on his phone. During Family therapy Ricky brings up how affected he was by having to deal with Amy when she self harmed herself and had to call ambulance.

Later on Ricky had braces put on and on Fathers day Lily gave him a fathers day card to celebrate and when Denzel tells them a story about his cousins mate they worry and start thinking about making money for their daughter and Lily thinks of trying to get money from Theo which Ricky agrees to help with Lily meets with him and Ricky is round corner out of sight. At a family group conference Ricky and Lily families meet with social services to discuss and plan for Ricky and Lily's daughter's arrival. Ricky covers for Lily when she is asked how she afforded some baby equipment. During the meeting Ricky suggests asking if school would let them take maybe one day a week off to spend with their daughter which Jack shuts down as he tells Ricky it isn't realistic. Following the birth of their daughter, Ricky and Lily name her Charli, after singer/songwriter Charli XCX. Ricky then tells Jack that he has decided to change his own surname to Branning, as he has always felt more of a Branning than a Mitchell.

== Greg Jessop ==
Greg Jessop is the fiancé of Tanya Branning (Jo Joyner), making his first appearance on 1 October 2010. He appears to get on well with Tanya's children, Lauren (Jacqueline Jossa), Abi (Lorna Fitzgerald) and Oscar (Charlee & Neo Hall), although her former husband Max Branning (Jake Wood) dislikes Greg. The character left EastEnders on 12 August 2011, after Tanya's affair with Max was revealed by Max's fiancée Vanessa Gold (Zöe Lucker). He returned on 21 October 2011, however, after being informed by Lauren that Tanya has cervical cancer. He left that same episode.

== Michael Moon ==
Michael Moon, played by Steve John Shepherd, is a distant cousin of Alfie Moon (Shane Richie), who first appears on 1 October 2010 after Alfie's return. Michael is described as a competitive and manipulative risk-taker who lives dangerously. He is a charmer with an eye for the ladies, but is willing to stab anyone in the back. He is the father of Tommy Moon, whose mother is Kat Moon (Jessie Wallace), Alfie's wife. He has a relationship with Roxy Mitchell (Rita Simons) but is disliked by Roxy's sister Ronnie (Samantha Womack), because when her son James died, she secretly swapped him with Tommy. In 2011, he is joined by his father Eddie Moon (David Essex) and brothers Anthony (Matt Lapinskas) and Tyler (Tony Discipline), and Michael's personality is further explored with their arrival. On 1 November 2013, Michael died after being stabbed by his wife Janine Butcher (Charlie Brooks), although Michael's young lover Alice Branning (Jasmyn Banks) is framed for his murder by Janine.

== Julie Perkins ==
Julie Perkins
- EastEnders character
- Portrayed by: Cathy Murphy
- Duration: 2010–2011
- First appearance: Episode 4087; 14 October 2010
- Last appearance: Episode 4260; 5 August 2011
- Introduced by: Bryan Kirkwood
In-universe information
- Occupation: Cleaner; Flower stall worker
- Sons: Dan Pearce
- Granddaughters: Lola Pearce
- Other relatives: Lexi Pearce

Julie Perkins, played by Cathy Murphy, is a woman from Billy Mitchell's (Perry Fenwick) past. She made her first appearance on 14 October 2010. When Billy is visited by police, it is revealed that Julie became pregnant by Henry Mason (Brian Hibbard), a paedophile who worked at the children's home where Julie and Billy lived during their childhood. Julie arrives in Walford the following week and surprises Billy by coming to his door. Julie says she does not want to testify against Henry, and leaves when Phil Mitchell (Steve McFadden) and Jay Brown (Jamie Borthwick) return home. She telephones Billy asking him to meet her at the café, where she reveals that even though Henry Mason raped her, they always used contraception, and the only time she did not was when she had sex with Billy. She tells Billy that he has an adult son. She explains that he was taken away from her a week after he was born, and says he probably had a better life. However, Billy gets angry, saying a child should know his parents and tells Julie she should never have come, so she leaves. However, Billy soon contacts Julie again, and she helps him sell stock on his market stall. He invites her round the next week, and Jay notes that she has made an effort to look good for Billy. They go to a party at the Slaters, where Billy invites Julie to his cousin Ronnie Mitchell's (Samantha Womack) upcoming wedding and she accepts. She later sees Stacey Branning (Lacey Turner) taking off her high heel stilettos and steals them, leaving her own shoes behind. When Billy realises Julie has gone, he phones her and she says she left the party because she felt unwell.

Julie arrives for Ronnie's wedding where £20,000 goes missing. Ronnie's sister Roxy Mitchell (Rita Simons) accuses Julie of stealing it, though she did not. At the reception, Stacey sees Julie wearing her shoes and confronts her, and Roxy empties Julie's bag looking for the money, revealing Julie has filled it with food. Julie runs off and Billy catches up to her. She reveals she is wearing an electronic tag and is under curfew as she is staying in a hostel and she is trying to make her room feel like her own. Billy says this does not matter to him. Julie is accused again when she wears an expensive coat that she found, that the real thief, Shirley Carter (Linda Henry), bought. Julie spends the day helping Dot Branning (June Brown) at the laundrette and they become friends. However, Julie leaves embarrassed after Mo Harris (Laila Morse) reveals to Dot that Julie is wearing the tag. She later gets a job from Mo's granddaughter Kat Moon (Jessie Wallace), cleaning at The Queen Victoria pub but she accidentally disconnects the beer pumps. Kat sacks her but Patrick Trueman (Rudolph Walker) and Billy persuade Kat to give Julie another chance. When Julie asks to store some things around Billy's house, he discovers some photos of a man. Thinking Julie is in a relationship, he confronts her, but she explains that they are pictures of their son, Roger Green (Daniel Brocklebank). Billy wants to see Roger, but Julie warns it is too late. However, Billy finds his address in Julie's belongings and goes to visit him. Once at the house, Billy announces that he is his father. Roger denies this, and Julie turns up and pulls Billy away. She explains that she could not trace their real son, so fantasised that Roger, her former boss, was their son instead. Billy forgives Julie, but informs her that he has contacted an adoption agency about their son. Billy and Julie then start a proper romantic relationship as a couple and after her tag is removed she moves in with him, as well as getting a job on the flower stall. She befriends Heather Trott (Cheryl Fergison) after Heather catches her stealing and then writing a birthday card to her son, forcing her to reveal that she gave him up for adoption.

Julie asks Kat to come with her to the park as she is meeting Billy's son, Will Mitchell (Toby Warpole), for the first time and is worried that she is not ready to be a stepmother. However, as they play in the park, it goes well and Julie thanks Kat for coming. Billy discovers the name of his and Julie's son is Dan Pearce. They go to visit him but find out he died three months previously. However, they discover they have a granddaughter, Lola Pearce (Danielle Harold). Billy and Julie visit Lola in care and Billy bonds with her, but Julie feels she is trouble and not their problem when she continues to visit Billy. Lola tells Julie that she will win if Billy is forced to choose between them, so Julie calls the police to have Lola taken back into care. She later admits to Billy that she did this, however, she later allows Lola to move in with her and Billy. She is angry with Billy when he refuses to discipline Lola, and worries when a social worker allows Lola to stay though they are squatting and the social worker will want to see a tenancy agreement.

Julie takes the blame when Lola accidentally injures Jay while he is working in the Arches. The accident occurs when Lola begins working for Phil but he fires her after catching her stealing. Lola, in a fit of rage, smashes up the Arches and kicks a piece of heavy equipment down into the pit, which hits Jay and knocks him unconscious. Lola goes back to the care home when Jay gives her a day to confess the truth, and is persuaded to come back by Billy. She tells Julie that she will win if Billy is forced to choose, and Julie, realising she and Lola have no future together, leaves after saying an emotional farewell to Billy.

=== Development ===
Described as a feisty character who is an "antidote to the snarling women of Albert Square", Julie's arrival leaves Billy shocked and turns his life upside down. The character is also described as a "cockney geezer bird [who] is more at home down the pub with the boys but underneath her robust layer, there's a little girl abandoned by her mum wanting to be loved." Her profile on the EastEnders website additionally describes her as straight talking, good, tough, kind-hearted with a good sense of humour and vulnerable. She tells the truth and is not intentionally malicious, and deals with the world by putting up a barrier. She never complains, gets on well with children and young people, has a firm sense of morality and questions everything around her. Speaking about the role, Murphy said: "Like our characters, I've known Perry since I was 16 and he is a brilliant actor. We've never worked together before so I am looking forward to getting stuck into our fantastic rollercoaster of a story." Julie is Murphy's third role in the soap, having appeared in 1991 as Lorna and again as Trisha Taylor in 2005.

An EastEnders spokesperson commented on Julie's storyline: "Julie and Billy have a real connection despite being out of each other's lives since they were teenagers. She's a true Cockney sparrow and tells it like it is. However, Billy is staggered to learn he may have more skeletons in the closet waiting to be discovered." Fenwick discussed the storyline saying, "They were both 15 when Julie got pregnant, but Billy, like everyone else in the children's home, thought it was this carer who knocked him and the other kids about. But when she explains it wasn't her fault and they took the baby away from her, he shifts his anger to the authorities. They haven't told me exactly what's going to happen, but I know they're going to be really clever with this story. There'll be lots of twists and turns..."

In June 2011, it was announced that Danielle Harold had joined the cast, playing Julie and Billy's 15-year-old granddaughter Lola Pearce. It was reported that Billy and Julie would be shocked to learn of Lola's existence, not knowing the son they once gave up for adoption had a daughter, but would decide to track her down and find her living in a care home.

On 21 June 2011, it was revealed that Murphy had left EastEnders. Digital Spy reported that she had finished filming and her last scenes would air over the following weeks. Julie's exit is sparked by the arrival of her granddaughter and when Lola gets into trouble, Julie takes the blame and leaves.

== Kai Jackson ==
Kai Jackson
- EastEnders character
- Portrayed by: Shay Spencer
- First appearance: Episode 4093; 25 October 2010
- Last appearance: Episode 4094; 26 October 2010
- Introduced by: Bryan Kirkwood
In-universe information
- Father: Alan Jackson
- Half-brothers: Billie Jackson
- Other relatives: Blossom Jackson

Kai Jackson, played by Shay Spencer, is the son of Alan Jackson (Howard Antony) and half brother of Billie Jackson (Devon Anderson). He appears on screen on 25 and 26 October 2010. Kai appears alongside his mother, father and great grandmother Blossom Jackson (Mona Hammond) at Billie's wake. When Alan's ex-wife and Billie's mother Carol Jackson (Lindsey Coulson) sees him, she leaves as he reminds her of Billie at that age. Kai then shows the family a trick that Billie had taught him, namely axillary flatulence. They return home after the wake.

Five-year-old Spencer was cast in the role after a friend of his mother's found out EastEnders was looking to cast a boy of his age, fitting his description. Spencer's mother, Jo Dufficy, sent in a photo and said the programme's makers liked what they saw. He filmed his scenes over three days in August 2010. His father Trevor said, "This was a wonderful experience for Shay and everyone thought he did a great job, especially as this was his first acting role. He [...] was a little bit nervous at first but the cast of EastEnders were really good and made him feel welcome. At the end of filming he received a big round of applause from the cast and crew. We are really excited about seeing him on TV."

== Yusef Khan ==
Doctor Yusef Khan, played by Ace Bhatti, is the father of Afia Khan (Meryl Fernandes) and former husband of Zainab Masood (Nina Wadia). He appears from 23 November 2010. Described as strong-willed, he arrives as Walford's new general practitioner. Bhatti has praised the cast for being so welcoming to him. Speaking to Inside Soap, he explained that he is "thrilled" to be a part of the regular EastEnders cast.

Yusef is Zainab's former husband and started a fire that Zainab was trapped in while they were married off screen. Yusef arrives in Walford and immediately makes a strong enemy in Zainab's husband Masood Ahmed (Nitin Ganatra) and continues to enrage him, leading Masood to kidnap Yusef, but Yusef gets his payback by turning Masood's family against him. He constantly tries to make amends with Zainab and is mistakenly accused of having an affair with her; Zainab's entire family abandons her when they find out Yusef stayed the night with Zainab, immediately seeing the wrong side of it. However audiences start to see that bad side to Yusef as he starts to show violence towards Zainab in the events running up to Christmas 2011.

== Edward Bishop ==
Edward Bishop
- EastEnders character
- Portrayed by: Frank Barrie
- Duration: 2010–2011
- First appearance: Episode 4116; 3 December 2010
- Last appearance: Episode 4217; 24 May 2011
- Introduced by: Bryan Kirkwood
In-universe information
- Occupation: Church organist; Church choirmaster; Volunteer

Edward Bishop, played by Frank Barrie, is the leader of the local church choir, who appears between 3 December 2010 and 24 May 2011. The choir is attended by Grace Olubunmi (Ellen Thomas), Dot Branning (June Brown), Heather Trott (Cheryl Fergison), Kim Fox (Tameka Empson), Mercy Olubunmi (Bunmi Mojekwu) and Fatboy (Ricky Norwood). After the choir's performance on Christmas Eve, Edward collects money for the church organ and becomes friends with Dot. He asks Dot if she could help collect the money to buy a new organ and she accepts. He collects the collection money form the Launderette, leaving a note that gets lost, and plays at Tommy Moon's funeral. He later visits Dot when she applies for community meals for her husband Jim Branning (John Bardon). He upsets Dot by bringing Jim the wrong food, but then reveals that he has been asked to stop volunteering because he spends too much time playing dominoes with clients instead of just delivering food. Dot then successfully helps Edward get his job back.

When Edward takes Jim to the park and the bookmakers, she is angry, feeling it could affect Jim's health. She later forgives him and he brings her a tape of old music. When Carol Jackson (Lindsey Coulson) calls Edward Dot's "fancy man", she is annoyed and later tells Edward she does not want him there any more, other than to bring Jim his meals. When community meals are cancelled, Fatboy, Mercy and Kim bring Dot much food, so Edward arrives and throws them out. Edward leaves after taking Dot to the pub, and says he does not know when he will see her again. He visits Dot after buying flowers from Walford market to take to his wife's grave. They go to an over-60s film night at The Queen Victoria pub, and Edward tells Dot about his former lover, Betty, whom he met years ago and Dot tells him that she will help him find her on the internet. Dot contacts Betty via email and Betty then contacts Edward and they agree to meet. Dot hires a new carer, Marta Demboski (Magdalena Kurek) when Marta asks Edward why Dot is treating her badly, Edward sorts it out. Edward organises tea at the Ritz with Betty, but cancels so he can go with Dot. However, Dot has to cancel because Jim is returning home unexpectedly. Edward visits Dot again and invites her to watch a film at home. While they watch, Edward holds Dot's hand, but she pulls away. He admits that he likes her but she says she is married, so thanks Edward for the nice things he has done but tells him to leave and never return. The next day he calls her several times but she tells him to stop. He arrives on Albert Square to talk to Dot and she agrees to hear him out, but she ends up telling him again to leave her alone.

=== Development ===
In March 2011, June Brown discussed Dot and Edward's relationship in an interview with Digital Spy. She opined that the two characters have a lot in common, Edward enjoys Dot's company and would probably want a more romantic relationship but respects the fact she has a husband. Dot also enjoys spending time with Edward but is mortified when Carol Jackson (Lindsey Coulson) calls him her "fancy man" and is worried that other people will think they are more than friends. He was described by TV Scoop as "Dot's doting pal". An insider explained: "Carol doesn't really mean anything by it, but she makes a comment about Dot's relationship with Edward that really stings. Dot thinks Carol is implying there is something inappropriate about their friendship, and she's outraged and humiliated." In May 2011, Brown said that Dot feels guilty about her relationship with Edward as "there is an attraction there, but because of her religious views she feels it is wrong."

== James Branning ==
James Branning
- EastEnders character
- Portrayed by: Uncredited
- Duration: 2010–2011
- First appearance: Episode 4134; 30 December 2010
- Last appearance: Episode 4136; 1 January 2011
In-universe information
- Other names: Tommy Moon
- Family: Branning/Mitchell
- Father: Jack Branning
- Mother: Ronnie Mitchell
- Half-brothers: Ricky Branning; Matthew Mitchell Cotton
- Half-sisters: Penny Branning; Amy Mitchell; Danielle Jones
- Grandfathers: Jim Branning; Archie Mitchell
- Grandmothers: Reenie Branning; Glenda Mitchell
- Uncles: Derek Branning; Max Branning; Danny Mitchell
- Aunts: April Branning; Carol Jackson; Suzy Branning; Roxy Mitchell
- Nephews: Ethan Branning-Panesar
- Nieces: Charli Slater
- First cousins: Joey Branning; Alice Branning; Bradley Branning; Lauren Branning; Abi Branning; Oscar Branning; Annie Carter; Bianca Jackson; Robbie Jackson; Sonia Fowler; Billie Jackson; Amy Mitchell
- Other relatives: Phil Mitchell; Grant Mitchell; Sam Mitchell; Ben Mitchell; Louise Mitchell; Raymond Dawkins; Lexi Pearce; Peggy Taylor; Billy Mitchell; Will Mitchell; Janet Mitchell; Lola Pearce

James Branning is the son of Jack Branning (Scott Maslen) and Ronnie Mitchell (Samantha Womack). He is born on-screen in episode 4134 first broadcast on 30 December 2010. Ronnie Branning (Samantha Womack) discovers that her son, who was born on the same day as Kat's, has died of sudden infant death syndrome and desperately tries to get help. When she hears Tommy crying, she sneaks into The Queen Vic and decides to swap the children. Ronnie eventually regrets her actions, but by the time she decides to swap them back, James has been found by Alfie and Jack has returned to the country and meets Tommy, thinking he is James.

== Tommy Moon ==
Tommy Moon
- EastEnders character
- Portrayed by: Shane and Ralfie White (2010–2015); Shay Crotty (2015–2021); Sonny Kendall (2021–present)
- Duration: 2010–2016, 2018–present
- First appearance: Episode 4134; 30 December 2010
- Introduced by: Bryan Kirkwood (2010); John Yorke (2018)
- Spin-off appearances: Kat & Alfie: Redwater (2017); EastEnders: The Podcast (2018)
In-universe information
- Other names: James Branning
- Family: Slater
- Father: Michael Moon
- Mother: Kat Slater
- Adoptive father: Alfie Moon
- Stepfather: Phil Mitchell (2023-25)
- Stepmother: Janine Butcher (2012-13)
- Half-brothers: Dermott Dolan; Bert Moon; Ernie Moon
- Half-sisters: Zoe Slater; Scarlett Butcher; Cherry Slater (adoptive)
- Grandfathers: Eddie Moon; Charlie Slater
- Grandmothers: Viv Slater
- Uncles: Craig Moon; Anthony Moon; Tyler Moon
- Aunts: Lynne Hobbs; Belinda Peacock; Little Mo Mitchell; Francesca Moon
- Nephews: Josh Goodwin
- Nieces: Jasmine Fisher
- First cousins: Freddie Slater; Vivienne Hobbs
- Other relatives: Mo Harris; Harry Slater; Sean Slater; Stacey Slater; Lily Slater; Arthur Fowler; Hope Fowler; Kyle Slater; Hayley Slater; Alfie Moon; Spencer Moon; Bert Moon; Ernie Moon; Cherry Slater; Charli Slater

Tommy Moon is the son of Kat Slater (Jessie Wallace) and Michael Moon (Steve John Shepherd). Tommy is initially played by two twin babies named Ralfie and Shane White, though in November 2013, Richie talked about Ralf (now aged three years) playing Tommy and made no mention of Shane. Shay Crotty took over the role from White in December 2015, and returned to it when Tommy returned in December 2018. In the Kat and Alfie spin-off series Redwater, which aired in 2017, Tommy is played by Henry Proctor. On 25 November 2018, it was announced Tommy and his half-brothers, Bert and Ernie Moon, would be returning to EastEnders. In April 2021, the role was recast to Sonny Kendall, who made his on-screen debut as Tommy on 2 July 2021.

Tommy is born on-screen on 30 December 2010. In the following episode, Kat is taken to hospital and leaves her father Charlie Slater (Derek Martin) to look after Tommy. However, Charlie joins a party downstairs in The Queen Victoria public house. Meanwhile, Ronnie Branning (Samantha Womack) discovers that her son, James, who was born on the same day as Kat's, has died of sudden infant death syndrome and desperately tries to get help. When she hears Tommy crying, she sneaks into The Queen Vic and decides to swap the children. Ronnie eventually regrets her actions, but by the time she decides to swap them back, James has been found by Alfie and Jack has returned to the country and meets Tommy, thinking he is James. When Kat sees the baby in the hospital, she refuses to believe it is Tommy, as he looks different, but Alfie convinces her it is because he has died. When a midwife visits Ronnie, she is surprised at how quickly James' club foot appears to have gone. Ronnie is denied access to the funeral by Kat but goes anyway, hiding behind a tree. She later realises she has to put an end to the situation, and takes Tommy back to Kat during the wake. Ronnie's attempts to explain that the baby is Tommy are all misunderstood and Kat demands that the baby be taken away from her.

Ronnie continues to care for Tommy but starts behaving erratically. She later returns to the hospital where she gave birth, and meets her midwife, Diane McLean (Hannah Kew). Ronnie realises she has to give Tommy back to Kat immediately. She tells Jack that the baby is not his son, and then explains to Kat what happened on the night James died. Kat refuses to believe it, but takes Tommy, while Ronnie hands herself in to the police. Jack says an emotional goodbye the next day as he hands Tommy over to social services. Alfie is interviewed by a social worker, but Kat leaves the hospital unable to cope.

However, Jean Slater (Gillian Wright) tells Kat that it is a miracle that Tommy is alive, so Kat returns to the hospital to be interviewed, and they are reunited with Tommy. Although Kat struggles to bond with Tommy at first and refuses to say his name, she soon adjusts and she and Alfie have Tommy christened; his godparents are Jean and Ian Beale (Adam Woodyatt). However, Alfie and Kat end their marriage, and they share custody of Tommy. Michael tells Tommy that he is his real father, angering Alfie, though Tommy is still too young to understand. Michael dies in November 2013 after being stabbed by Janine Butcher (Charlie Brooks); however, later that month, Kat and Alfie reunite. In 2014, Kat gives birth to Tommy's twin brothers Bert and Ernie Moon (Freddie and Stanley Beale). Kat is badly burnt in a fire, and afterwards, she becomes depressed, separating from Alfie, which affects Tommy negatively. Kat eventually reunites with Alfie. They win £1 million on a scratchcard and depart for a new life in Spain. Kat returns on Christmas Day to surprise her cousin, Stacey Branning (Lacey Turner), without Alfie and the children. Later, Alfie returns with Tommy, Bert and Ernie, annoyed that Kat has left them without warning.

=== Development ===
In September 2010, Shane Richie, who plays Kat's husband Alfie Moon, teased an upcoming storyline involving Alfie and Kat. Although he gave no details of the plot, he said that when he was offered the chance to return to the show to reprise his role as Alfie, he was informed of the storyline, which would be ongoing for "the best part of a year or maybe two years." He said it would be "the biggest soap story in probably the history of soaps," and that he and Wallace were excited to be involved. On 11 November 2010, details of the upcoming storyline were revealed by the BBC.

Executive producer Bryan Kirkwood said of the baby swap storyline: "This story built on the rich history both characters have built up over the years and the story team have worked hard to make this convincing and powerful. Although EastEnders is a fictional drama we have, of course, taken great care to thoroughly research this storyline, which will reflect a [sic] issue close to the hearts of some of our audience. We're fortunate to have two wonderful actresses, Jessie Wallace and Samantha Womack, who understand the need to portray such an emotive subject sensitively. Viewers will know that Ronnie has had a difficult past, losing both her daughter and father in the last couple of years. When she loses the one thing she's always wanted, she acts on impulse in a moment of sheer grief and desperation." Kirkwood later said the scenes would be believable and the storyline bold and gritty. He confirmed that a maternity nurse had been consulted on what would happen in real life, saying the crew made sure the two babies were born in different circumstances. The baby swap scenes are balanced with scenes of celebration elsewhere, to show "a community with a lot of love" in the hope it would "counter the inevitable darkness of this story."

It was reported on 24 December that several scenes had been edited prior to the broadcast. Shots of Ronnie touching James's cold hand were reportedly edited out and the sound of Tommy crying was toned down. A scene showing Kat in blood-soaked pyjamas after haemorrhaging was also edited. The baby's funeral was filmed on 25 November at St James' Church in Bushey.

The scene where Ronnie swaps the children was called "powerful". Around 3,400 viewer complaints were received by the BBC, with viewers branding the storyline "insensitive", "irresponsible" and "desperate". Roz Laws from the Sunday Mercury called the plot "shocking and ridiculous" and asked "are we really supposed to believe that Kat won't recognise that the baby looks different?", although this comment was made prior to the episode where Kat didn't recognise 'her' baby. The Foundation for the Study of Infant Deaths (FSID) praised the storyline, and its director Joyce Epstein explained, "We are very grateful to EastEnders for their accurate depiction of the devastating effect that the sudden death of an infant can have on a family. We hope that this story will help raise the public's awareness of cot death, which claims 300 babies' lives each year." According to overnight figures, 10.6 million people watched 3 January 2011 episode, in which Kat claims the dead baby is not her son and Ronnie struggles to bond with Tommy.

In February 2011, the storyline was nominated in the Soap Bubble Awards under the name of 'baby swap', in the category 'Best Baby Drama'. In May, it was nominated for 'Best Storyline' at the 2011 British Soap Awards, under the title "Ronnie swaps her baby for Kat's".

In April 2021, actor Crotty announced that he would be leaving EastEnders via Instagram. He stated that it was an honour to work alongside Wallace and Richie, and thanked the producers of the soap for having him on the soap. Digital Spy confirmed that despite Crotty's departure, Tommy would continue to appear in the soap. In June 2021, it was announced Sonny Kendall would be taking over the role and his first scenes would air on 1 July 2021.

== Others ==
Character	Date(s)	Actor	Circumstances
Emma West	14–15 January (2 episodes)	Ellie Beaven	Archie Mitchell's (Larry Lamb) solicitor. She arrives for the reading of Archie's will, but her paperwork gets dropped and blows around the Square. When Archie's second wife Peggy (Barbara Windsor) finds out that Archie divorced his first wife Glenda (Glynis Barber), Glenda denies it but Emma confirms that this would be possible even without Glenda's signature. Before she leaves, Billy Mitchell (Perry Fenwick) invites her to come back for a drink any time she wants.
Loretta	18–22 January (3 episodes)	Nicola Hughes	The chair of the church's fundraising committee. She helps out Lucas Johnson (Don Gilet) with a jumble sale and Lucas' wife Denise (Diane Parish) takes a disliking to her. Loretta returns some clothes to Denise that she donated, implying they are unfashionable and nobody would buy them. Denise gets rid of her by getting Bianca Jackson (Patsy Palmer) to call her pretending to be from a lottery, saying she has won a prize and has to go to collect it. When Loretta calls Bianca back, Bianca says it must be a wrong number and hangs up.
Julia	18 January	Vinny Dhillon	A social worker who visits Ian Beale (Adam Woodyatt) and Jane Beale (Laurie Brett), who are applying to adopt a child.
Nick Greenway	19 January	David Annen	Ian Beale's (Adam Woodyatt) solicitor after he is arrested on suspicion of murdering Archie Mitchell (Larry Lamb).
Reg	21–26 January (2 episodes)	Trevor Byfield	Glenda Mitchell's (Glynis Barber) neighbour. When Glenda's daughter Ronnie (Samantha Womack) visits her, Reg is outside the flat and stares at Ronnie. He later tries to give Glenda some flowers and is very insistent that he sees her, but Ronnie tells him to go. Outside, he tells Ronnie that Glenda has never mentioned her. The following week, when Ronnie and her sister Roxy (Rita Simons) come looking for Glenda, Reg tells them she has moved on. After they leave, Glenda pays Reg with cigarettes for lying for her.
Dr Clayton	25 January	Claire Askam	A doctor who talks to Pat Evans' (Pam St Clement) family after Pat suffers a heart attack.
Leyton	26 January – 1 February (2 episodes)	Daniel Crowder	A man who Christian Clarke (John Partridge) spends the night with, and wakes up not remembering anything. He annoys Christian, who tries to avoid him, but Christian later introduces him as his boyfriend to make Syed Masood (Marc Elliott) jealous. The next week, Christian tells Leyton they need to talk. It is revealed later in the week that Christian split up with Leyton.
Mr Allcock	23 February– 2 March, 24–26 August (7 episodes)	Bill Buckhurst	Walford High School's headmaster. After Shirley Carter (Linda Henry) fails to get her niece Zsa Zsa (Emer Kenny) into the school, Mr Allcock is paid a visit from Phil Mitchell (Steve McFadden), asking him for a favour. Zsa Zsa is given an appointment, which she decides to attend after taking a liking to Mr Allcock's physique. Zsa Zsa flirts with him, and when Shirley asks her to leave the room, she does too. Zsa Zsa gets a place in school but Shirley realises it is down to Phil's visit. In August, Mr Allcock visits Ian Beale (Adam Woodyatt) to say his daughter Lucy's (Melissa Suffield) GCSE results are inconsistent, there has been an allegation of cheating, and both Lucy and her twin Peter's (Thomas Law) exam papers must be looked at.
David Hensler	24–25 February (2 episodes)	Jonty Stephens	David is Masood Ahmed's (Nitin Ganatra) line manager at Royal Mail. He watches Masood on his round, and later turns up at the house with his colleague Steven Fuller from the Royal Mail Investigation Unit, saying there has been an allegation of stolen post and they must search Masood's house. They find a package for Max Branning (Jake Wood) that Masood was holding, and David later issues Masood with a caution.
Steven Fuller	24–25 February (2 episodes)	Uncredited	David is Masood Ahmed's (Nitin Ganatra) line manager at Royal Mail. He watches Masood on his round, and later turns up at the house with his colleague Steven Fuller from the Royal Mail Investigation Unit, saying there has been an allegation of stolen post and they must search Masood's house. They find a package for Max Branning (Jake Wood) that Masood was holding, and David later issues Masood with a caution.
Mitch Gannon	2–29 March, 25 October (6 episodes)	Theo Barklem-Biggs	A friend of Billie Jackson's (Devon Anderson) from his housing estate in Balham. He appears alongside his fellow gang members Kylie (Elarica Gallacher) and Connor Stanley (Arinze Kene) when they attack Whitney Dean (Shona McGarty). A few weeks later, Kylie, Connor and Mitch take Billie for drinks but are told to leave by Phil Mitchell (Steve McFadden). The gang decide to rob the pub using a fake gun, and they get away with the money. After Billie dies, Mitch and the rest of the gang arrive for his funeral but are told to stay away by his mother Carol Jackson (Lindsey Coulson).
Dave	9 March	John Cummins	A customer at the car lot. Carol Jackson (Lindsey Coulson) attempts to sell him a car and uses Billy Mitchell (Perry Fenwick) to help increase the price, but when Billy goes too high, Dave says he cannot afford it and leaves.
Theresa	11 March	Dolya Gavanski	A florist who Libby Fox (Belinda Owusu) and Patrick Trueman (Rudolph Walker) visit to find out who sent flowers to Liz Turner (Kate Williams). They pretend they were from Patrick's son whom they had not heard from until he sent the flowers, but when Theresa refuses to give out details, Libby steals a CCTV tape.
Tim Brown	15 March	Keir Charles	A man looking at the beauty salon that Roxy Mitchell (Rita Simons) is thinking of buying. Roxy flirts with him but tells him it is a bad site as the last business had no customers. Roxy later tells him she will not be bidding and he reveals he is not bidding himself but was looking at the property on behalf of Roxy's sister Ronnie (Samantha Womack).
Bev	15 March	Nichola Jane Theobald	Two attractive women who come into The Queen Victoria public house. Phil Mitchell (Steve McFadden) and Minty Peterson (Cliff Parisi) offer to pay for their drinks but they leave when Phil gets annoyed with Minty.
Debs	15 March	Uncredited	Two attractive women who come into The Queen Victoria public house. Phil Mitchell (Steve McFadden) and Minty Peterson (Cliff Parisi) offer to pay for their drinks but they leave when Phil gets annoyed with Minty.
Dr Cameron	23–25 March (2 episodes)	Aicha Kossoko	The doctor who Lucy Beale (Melissa Suffield) visits to have a termination.
Terry	29 March– 5 April (3 episodes)	Jon Foster	A social worker who assesses Phil Mitchell's (Steve McFadden) suitability for custody of his estranged daughter Louise (Britney Papple). After questioning the family, he tells them Louise should be able to move in.
Luther	1 April	Peter McNally	An employee at R&R who takes charge after his boss Jack Branning (Scott Maslen) is shot by Kylie (Elarica Gallacher).
Mr Steele	1–22 April (8 episodes)	Simon Wilson	The consultant who tells Jack Branning's (Scott Maslen) family that he could end up severely brain damaged after being shot. He looks after Jack and explains to the family that he is paralysed down one side of his body. When Ronnie Mitchell (Samantha Womack) drops some paperwork at the hospital, he returns it to her and when she thinks he is coming onto her, she orders him out. He later returns to apologise and they end up dancing together and later, kissing. When Jack's brother Max (Jake Wood) tells Jack he saw Ronnie and Mr Steele kissing, Mr Steele makes a comment about Ronnie's lips so Jack punches him in the face. When Ronnie finds out, she breaks up with Mr Steele as she realises Jack still has feelings for her.
Cllr Singh Walia	9 April	Ranjit Krishnamma	A local councillor who comes to meet residents at The Queen Victoria public house. As Pat Evans (Pam St Clement) and Peggy Mitchell (Barbara Windsor) tell him he is doing a bad job, he suffers a heart attack and is taken away in an ambulance. He stands down from the council, prompting Pat and Peggy to both apply for his position.
Julie	12 April	Amy Edge	Fatboy's (Ricky Norwood) date, who Fatboy brings on a double date with Leon Small (Sam Attwater) and Zsa Zsa Carter (Emer Kenny). After the date, Fatboy tells Leon that she is bisexual and fancies Zsa Zsa.
Tasha	12–16 April (4 episodes)	Charlotte Beaumont	The leader of a gang of schoolgirls that bully Ben Mitchell (Charlie Jones). After one confrontation, they chase Ben and take his new trainers. When Ben's father Phil (Steve McFadden) discovers this, he tells Tasha to have the trainers cleaned. When she returns them, she apologises to Ben, but then tells her friends that she stood up to him. Shirley Carter (Linda Henry) hears her bragging and tells her that Phil is the least of her worries. After Phil and Shirley talk to Tasha's father, Ben reports that there have been no more problems.
Elaine	15 April	Joanne Zorian	Louise Mitchell's (Brittany Papple) dance teacher. She encourages Louise's father Phil (Steve McFadden) to stay for her first lesson to build Louise's confidence.
Nurse Denton	19 April – 10 September (4 episodes)	Elicia Daly	A nurse who tends to Jack Branning (Scott Maslen), who is paralysed down one side after being shot in the head, Jordan Johnson (Michael-Joel David Stuart), who is in a coma after being hit on the head with a spanner, and Stacey Branning (Lacey Turner) and her baby Lily, who were injured in a fire.
Wałdoch (Note: The character is credited as "Tasha's father".)	20 April	Robert Jezek	Tasha's (Charlotte Beaumont) Polish father who Phil Mitchell (Steve McFadden) and Shirley Carter (Linda Henry) talk to about Tasha bullying Phil's son Ben (Charlie Jones). He agrees to talk to Tasha.
Dr Bickerton	4–7 May (2 episodes)	Catherine Kanter	Jack Branning's (Scott Maslen) doctor who Ronnie Mitchell (Samantha Womack) talks to about sending him to a private clinic.
Jonno	7 May	Garry Lammin	A man who gives a quote to fix the electrics at R&R nightclub for Ronnie Mitchell (Samantha Womack). However, he tells her the club must remain closed for a few days as it is a big job.
Nadim Abbasi	10–13 May (2 episodes)	Kriss Dosanjh	Bushra Abbasi's (Pooja Ghai) husband, an apparently wealthy man, who visits Masood Ahmed (Nitin Ganatra) and Zainab Masood (Nina Wadia) along with his wife. He also meets their gay son Syed Masood (Marc Elliott) at the mosque and allows him in when some men are blocking the entrance, but later tells him people will not forgive and forget and he should attend a different mosque.
Alex	14 May	Ben Joiner	A man who meets Christian Clarke (John Partridge) in The Queen Victoria public house. They get a bottle of wine but Christian leaves after hearing that Syed Masood (Marc Elliott) is in hospital after an overdose. Later, Christian meets Alex again invites him out to dinner.
Carver	20 May	Simon Tcherniak	Phil Mitchell's (Steve McFadden) solicitor.
Allen Conlon	20 May – 13 July (4 episodes)	Peter Vollebregt	A man claims he can cure Syed Masood (Marc Elliott) of his homosexuality. Although Syed's parents Zainab (Nina Wadia) and Masood (Nitin Ganatra) and brother Tamwar (Himesh Patel) are sceptical, Syed and Allen say it is possible and Syed can re-educate his mind. After several weeks of therapy, Syed is angry with Allen when he feels it is not working. Syed then decides to admit that he cannot change his sexuality and stops seeing Allen.
Katy	31 May	Leila Mimmack	When Peter Beale (Thomas Law) and Fatboy (Ricky Norwood) attend a party in Hampshire, Katy kisses Fatboy and Hayley kisses Peter. A fight breaks out between Peter and Hayley's boyfriend Vince, and Fatboy gets involved when he insults Hayley. Peter knees Vince in the groin and Peter and Fatboy escape from the party.
Vince	31 May	Oscar Ward	When Peter Beale (Thomas Law) and Fatboy (Ricky Norwood) attend a party in Hampshire, Katy kisses Fatboy and Hayley kisses Peter. A fight breaks out between Peter and Hayley's boyfriend Vince, and Fatboy gets involved when he insults Hayley. Peter knees Vince in the groin and Peter and Fatboy escape from the party.
Hayley	31 May	Charlotte Skeoch	When Peter Beale (Thomas Law) and Fatboy (Ricky Norwood) attend a party in Hampshire, Katy kisses Fatboy and Hayley kisses Peter. A fight breaks out between Peter and Hayley's boyfriend Vince, and Fatboy gets involved when he insults Hayley. Peter knees Vince in the groin and Peter and Fatboy escape from the party.
Simon James	31 May – 1 June	Peter Temple	A man who interviews Bianca (Patsy Palmer) and Ricky Butcher (Sid Owen) as their son Liam (James Forde) has not been accepted into his first choice of secondary school.
Andrew	1 June	Christopher Scoular	Two men that meet Pat Evans (Pam St Clement) and Peggy Mitchell (Barbara Windsor) in a restaurant and buy them drinks. Pat and Peggy run out on them because they both have dates that night.
Donald	1 June	Jack McKenzie	Two men that meet Pat Evans (Pam St Clement) and Peggy Mitchell (Barbara Windsor) in a restaurant and buy them drinks. Pat and Peggy run out on them because they both have dates that night.
DC Walker	8 June	Alexander Newland	A police officer who visits Jordan Johnson (Michael-Joel David Stuart) to see how he is before his attacker Ben Mitchell (Charlie Jones) is due in court. He explains that Ben could get up to four years detention.
Kirsty Montgomery	25 June	Bridget Fry	Stacey Branning's (Lacey Turner) midwife.
Gloria Fisher	30 June	Sharon Hinds	A woman who attends Lucas Johnson's (Don Gilet) Christian disco. His wife Denise (Diane Parish) dislikes her.
Rob Wilkins	30 June	Chris Bennett	A man who tries to chat up Ronnie Mitchell (Samantha Womack) but is thrown out when he insults her mother Glenda (Glynis Barber).
Gemma Charleston	30 June	Rita Balogun	A prostitute who asks Lucas Johnson (Don Gilet) if he wants some company. However, when he sees the crucifix around her neck, he leaves. Off-screen, Lucas murders Gemma and dumps her body in a canal, but identifies the body as that of his wife Denise (Diane Parish), who he has locked in a basement. Denise's funeral takes place with Gemma's body, but when Denise is found to be alive, Gemma has her own funeral on 6 August, with Denise and Patrick Trueman (Rudolph Walker) as the only attendants. The vicar (David Peart) says that none of Gemma's family could be traced, her funeral has been paid for by a charity and she will be buried in a mass grave.
Cal Childs	19, 30 July (2 episodes)	Danny Barnham	A boy who bullies Ben Mitchell (Charlie Jones) at the Young Offender Institution where he is being detained. After Ben's family visit him a second time, his father Phil (Steve McFadden) confronts Cal, and Cal punches him in the back.
Dagenham Derek Smith	20 July	Steven Osborne	A man who works at Dagenham Dave's selling furniture and bric-a-brac. He sells a mattress to Christian Clarke (John Partridge) and Syed Masood (Marc Elliott).
Mr Barker	20 July	Tom Keller	The funeral director who visits Denise Johnson's (Diane Parish) family to arrange her funeral.
Daphne Fox	23 July	Emi Wokoma	Denise Johnson (Diane Parish) and Kim Fox's (Tameka Empson) sister. She arrives to attend Denise's funeral (with everyone unaware Denise is actually still alive) and tells Denise's daughter Libby (Belinda Owusu) that she wishes she could have apologised to Denise for what she said to her. At Denise's wake, Liz Turner (Kate Williams) insults Denise, causing Daphne and Kim to start shouting at her.
Reverend Wallace	29 July	Mark Meadows	The vicar who speaks to Heather Trott (Cheryl Fergison) about a christening for her son George.
Rob Stevenson	30 July	Neil Grainger	A news reporter who disguises himself as a doctor to question Denise Johnson (Diane Parish) on her recent ordeal. He then poses as a police detective inspector to speak to Denise's family but when they ask for ID and he is unable to show any, they tell him to go away. The following week, a news story is printed in the Walford Gazette, stating that Denise misses her "killer husband", Lucas (Don Gilet).
Sgt Lewis Daley	3 August– 5 October (4 episodes)	Deka Walmsley	An army recruitment officer who is visited by Carol Jackson (Lindsey Coulson), Bianca Butcher (Patsy Palmer) and Whitney Dean (Shona McGarty) to find out why Billie Jackson (Devon Anderson) has been denied leave. He informs them that Billie took leave with his friends, and gives his number to Carol after Bianca tells him she is single. A few weeks later, they go on a date, but Carol walks out. He follows and shows her he would like to see her again by kissing her. They go on another date, meeting in the local park. When they see Carol's grandson Liam Butcher (James Forde), who is worried about going to his new school, Lewis gives him encouragement. A few weeks later he sends Carol chocolates so she arranges to meet him again. The following day he takes her to lunch, saying he has been busy with new army recruits. After the date, Glenda Mitchell (Glynis Barber) tells Carol she saw him remove a wedding ring, so Carol confronts him. Lewis says he is unhappy in his marriage but Carol pushes him away and he leaves.
Colin Logan	9 August	Matthew Barker	Jack Branning's (Scott Maslen) physiotherapist.
Kenneth "Ken" Tate	9–13 August (4 episodes)	Peter Blake	A brewery representative who wants to buy The Queen Victoria public house. He speaks to Glenda Mitchell (Glynis Barber) before introducing himself to Peggy Mitchell (Barbara Windsor), and realises that Peggy is trying to put him off. Peggy starts to like him and he says the pub is perfect. However, the owner, Roxy Mitchell (Rita Simons), eventually decides not to sell.
Officer Tamsin Reilly	23 August – 2 September (4 episodes)	Ruth Keeling	A prison officer who escorts Sam Mitchell (Danniella Westbrook) to hospital and supervises her during her stay.
Matt Hearn	2 September	Paul Jibson	Sam Mitchell's (Danniella Westbrook) midwife.
Brogan Callan	3 September	Lucinda Millward	The leader of a young mother's group attended by Stacey Branning (Lacey Turner), Becca Swanson (Simone James) and Stacey's baby Lily.
Tim Kenward	3 September	Danny Seldon	A man from an adoption agency when Sam Mitchell (Danniella Westbrook) wants her baby adopted, however, she changes her mind.
Richard Monroe	6–7 September (2 episodes)	Andrew Hall	A man who picks up Janine Butcher (Charlie Brooks) at the end of her hen party. She is impressed by his wealth and they go back to his house. The next morning he apologises for falling asleep, and Janine leaves, revealing she is getting married.
DC Andrew Newton	10 September 2010– 24 March 2014 (3 episodes)	Luke Harris	A police officer who speaks to Peggy Mitchell (Barbara Windsor) following a fire at The Queen Victoria public house (see Queen Vic Fire Week). In April 2011, he speaks to Ricky Butcher (Sid Owen), believing him to be picking up prostitutes, when he is searching for Whitney Dean (Shona McGarty). In March 2014, he arrests Stacey Branning (Lacey Turner) for the murder of Archie Mitchell (Larry Lamb).
Lee Finnerty	20–21 September (2 episodes)	Dylan Brown	Two men who come to Walford looking for Kat Moon (Jessie Wallace). They talk to her former neighbour Dot Branning (June Brown) saying Kat has won a prize, and Dot reveals where she lived. They are then let in the house by Jean Slater (Gillian Wright) before Kat returns. It is revealed Kat is on the run from them as she and her husband Alfie Moon (Shane Richie) conned their relative Frankie Finnerty. The break into the kitchen and argue with Kat and her family, and as Kat throws money at them, her husband Alfie enters pretending to be from the CID, causing them to run off quickly.
Jono Finnerty	20–21 September (2 episodes)	Colin Parry	
Edward Brooks	27–28 September (2 episodes)	Luke Striffler	The American boyfriend of Lauren Branning (Jacqueline Jossa) who she talks to on webcam and asks if he has booked his flights. The next day they speak again and he breaks up with her because she is in England now.
Claudia Maskry	4 October	Maria McErlane	A journalist for the Walford Gazette. Alfie Moon (Shane Richie) and his cousin Michael (Steve John Shepherd) try to sell her a story that they discovered they are long-lost identical twins. She does not believe it, but Alfie then tells her that The Queen Mother hid in The Queen Victoria public house during the war, and Mo Harris (Laila Morse) and Dot Branning (June Brown) back up his claims, and Michael shows her a piece of metal from an old German engine, saying it is part of a doodlebug.
Thommo Newby	4 October	Ras Barke	A man at R&R nightclub. First, he asks Billy Mitchell (Perry Fenwick) to supply toilet roll, and later dances behind Jean Slater's (Gillian Wright) back, so Billy tells him to leave.
DS Mulligan	8 October	Paul Ham	A police officer who visits Billy Mitchell (Perry Fenwick) as he is investigating a man who worked at the care home where Billy lived as a child.
Sgt Major Banfield	14 October	Toby Gaffney	An army major who gives Billie Jackson's (Devon Anderson) personal belongings to his mother, Carol (Lindsey Coulson), following his death.
Sgt Stone	19 October	Alun Raglan	The police sergeant in attendance at the police station when Kat Moon (Jessie Wallace), Stacey Branning (Lacey Turner), Janine Malloy (Charlie Brooks), Pat Evans (Pam St Clement), Kim Fox (Tameka Empson), Alfie Moon (Shane Richie) and Billy Mitchell (Perry Fenwick) are all arrested and locked up for the night.
Vicky Saunders	25 October	Jessica Ellerby	A woman who visits Vanessa Gold (Zöe Lucker) to issue divorce papers on behalf of Harry Gold (Linal Haft), but Vanessa rejects her. Later, Harry reveals that Vicky has replaced Vanessa, acting as his hostess.
PC/Sgt/DS Anthony Heathcote	1 November 2010– 7 January 2015 (8 episodes)	Jack Pierce	A police constable who attends when Stacey Branning (Lacey Turner) reports her daughter Lily missing. Heathcote appears again on Christmas Day when Stacey is accused of stabbing Janine Malloy (Charlie Brooks), but Stacey flees before she can be arrested. In June 2012, now a Sergeant, he questions Lola Pearce (Danielle Harold) about an allegation of vandalism and charges her the following week. In August 2012, Heathcote is the custody sergeant at Walford police station and charges Ben Mitchell (Joshua Pascoe) with the murder of Heather Trott (Cheryl Fergison). In October 2012, he attends Derek Branning's (Jamie Foreman) house, as his daughter Alice Branning (Jasmyn Banks) has been mugged. In January 2015, now a Detective Sergeant, Heathcote searches Dot Branning's (June Brown) house, looking for her son Nick Cotton (John Altman) who has faked his own death. He questions Dot, her grandson Charlie Cotton (Declan Bennett) and Charlie's mother Yvonne Cotton (Pauline McLynn) and reveals that Nick is wanted for armed robbery. Dot, Charlie and Yvonne deny seeing Nick and Heathcote leaves after giving Charlie his card.
Mr Atherton	22–26 November (3 episodes)	David Cann	An estate agent selling the local Indian restaurant, the Argee Bhajee. He shows Zainab Masood (Nina Wadia) and Ian Beale (Adam Woodyatt) around and Ian attempts to bribe him to find out Zainab's bid but Mr Atherton does not divulge. When Ian hands his bid to Mr Atherton, he pays him for another favour, namely to use the restaurant to host a romantic meal for him and his wife Jane (Laurie Brett).
Roger Green	6–7 December (2 episodes)	Daniel Brocklebank	A man who Julie Perkins (Cathy Murphy) claims to be her and Billy Mitchell's (Perry Fenwick) son. Billy meets Roger and tells him this, but Roger denies it. Julie explains to Billy that she could not trace their real son, so fantasised that Roger, her former boss, was their son instead.
Gloria MacDonald	20–21 December 2010, 5 February 2016 (3 episodes)	Michele Austin	Lucas Johnson's (Don Gilet) sister. When Lucas's wife Denise (Diane Parish) discovers that Lucas's son Jordan (Michael-Joel David Stuart) has been in contact with Gloria for five months since Lucas went to prison, she allows Jordan to stay with Gloria. In 2016, after hearing that Jordan has been in trouble with the police, Denise contacts Gloria, asking for his whereabouts so she can help him. Gloria reveals Jordan got involved in a gang and she was constantly visited by members from his or rival gangs and the police, so, unable to help him, she threw Jordan out after he was violent towards her and has not seen him since. Gloria tells Denise not to trust Jordan or Lucas, but Denise persuades her to at least spread the word and tell people she is looking for Jordan. Before Gloria leaves, Denise's friend Patrick Trueman (Rudolph Walker) gives her his telephone number so she can let him know first if she hears anything, so he can protect Denise.
Midwife Brigitte	28 December	Zina Badran	Kat Moon's (Jessie Wallace) midwife, though she sends Kat home as she is not ready to give birth yet.
Midwife Diane McLean	30 December 2010, 15 April 2011 (2 episodes)	Hannah Kew	Ronnie Branning's (Samantha Womack) midwife when she gives birth to her son James. In April 2011, Ronnie is at the hospital and meets Diane again.
Nurse Jenny	31 December– 6 January 2011 (3 episodes)	Alexia Healey	A nurse who looks after Kat Moon (Jessie Wallace) while she is in hospital after part of the placenta is left behind following the birth of her son Tommy. Kat also visits her after Tommy's supposed death, wondering if she did something wrong. Jenny tells Kat to speak to her husband.
