= Cathy Murphy =

British actress (born 1967)

- Born: 7 August 1967 (age 59); Essex, England
- Occupation: Actress
- Years active: 1982–
- Children: 2

Catherine McKevitt Murphy (born 7 August 1967) is a British actress. She is known for her television roles as Tilly Watkins in the BBC drama The House of Eliott (1991–1994), Cheryl Barker in the Channel 5 soap opera Family Affairs (2003–2004), and as Julie Perkins in the BBC soap opera EastEnders (2010–2011).

== Career ==
Born in Essex, England, Murphy studied at the Sylvia Young Theatre School. She played the role of Lorna in 1991, a love interest of Mark Fowler in soap opera EastEnders. In 2005 she returned to the show to play the recurring role of Trisha Taylor. Murphy had earlier played the ongoing role of Cheryl Barker in serial Family Affairs for one year. Prior to that, she played Tilly Watkins (later Foss) in The House of Elliot.

It was announced on 23 September 2010 that Murphy was to return to EastEnders for a third time, this time playing Julie Perkins, an old friend of long-running character Billy Mitchell. It was revealed on 21 June 2011 that Murphy had quit the role after nearly a year.

== Filmography ==
=== Film ===
Year	Title	Role	Notes
1982	Made in Britain		Television film
1983	Those Glory Glory Days	Tub	Television film
1984	Stars of the Roller State Disco	Paulette	Television film
1987	The Love Child	Linda	
1989	Edge of Sanity	Cockney Prostitute	
1989	The Phantom of the Opera	Esther	
1990	Memphis Belle	Jitterbugger	
1992	Fergie & Andrew: Behind the Palace Doors		Television film
1994	Captives	Companion	
1996	Moll Flanders	Polly	
1996	London Suite	Hotel Waitress	Television film
1999	The Murder of Stephen Lawrence	Woman at door	Television film
2001	On the Nose	Dolores	
2002	About a Boy	Nurse	
2003	Oh Marbella!	Tina	
2006	Irish Jam	Dora	
2007	Kings	Bridie	
2008	Poppy Shakespeare	Astrid	Television film
2009	Beacon77	Bag Lady	
2013	Welcome to the Punch	Nurse	
2016	Bridget Jones's Baby	Cashier	
2016	Their Finest	Vee	

=== Television ===
Year	Title	Role	Notes
1983	Nanny	Gloria Gaffen	Episode: "The Home Front"
1985	Scene	Jane	Episode: "Your Place or Mine"
1985	A.D.	First Girl	Episode: "Part 5"
1985	Bleak House	Housemaid	Miniseries; 2 episodes
1985	Sorry!	Sharon	Episode: "My Huckleberry Friend"
1985	Summer Season	Carol	Episode: "Time Trouble"
1986	The December Rose	Miranda McDipper	Miniseries; 6 episodes
1987	Foreign Bodies	Nurse	Episode: "Culture Clash"
1987	My Family and Other Animals	Jonquil	Miniseries; 1 episode
1988	Screen Two	Lois	Episode: "Lucky Sunil"
1989	The Bill	Cashier	Episode: "One for the Ladies"
1989	Agatha Christie's Poirot	Maid	Episode: "The King of Clubs"
1990	That's Love	Margaret	Recurring role; 2 episodes
1990	She-Wolf of London	Mary	Episode: "The Wild Hunt"
1991	May to December	Mrs. Elsworth	Episode: "That'll Be the Day"
1991	Screen Two	Nurse	Episode: "Aimée"
1991	Streetwise	Simone	Recurring role; 3 episodes
1991	Minder	Vicky	Episode: "The Cruel Canal"
1991	EastEnders	Lorna	Recurring role; 5 episodes
1991–1994	The House of Eliott	Tilly Foss (née Watkins)	Series regular; 34 episodes
1994	The Bill	Mandy Boxer	Episode: "Blackout"
1994	Men Behaving Badly	Saleswoman	Episode: "Bed"
1995	Rumble	Bryony	Recurring role; 5 episodes
1996	The Bill	Janine McPhail	Episode: "Decent Proposals"
1996	Casualty	Karen Knight	Episode: "Cheatin' Hearts"
1996	Expert Witness	Rita Barron	Episode: "The Body in the Box"
1996	Karaoke	Nurse	Episode: "Friday"
1996	The Tenant of Wildfell Hall	Miss Myers	Miniseries; 2 episodes
1997	The Bill	Angela Carey	Episode: "Crying Wolf"
1998	Real Women	Janet's Neighbour	Episode: "The Hangover"
1998	Maisie Raine	Patsy	Episode: "An Ordinary Little Tragedy"
1999	Casualty	Val Milburn	Episode: "Benny & the Vets"
1999	Oliver Twist	Vigil Keeper	Miniseries; 1 episode
2000	Doctors	Val Mason	Episode: "Damage Limitation"
2000	Hero to Zero	Janice	Recurring role; 5 episodes
2001	Best of Both Worlds	Trish	Miniseries; 2 episodes
2001	World of Pub	Lovely Susan	Episode: "Ladies"
2001	The Armando Iannucci Shows		Episode: "Mortality"
2002	Silent Witness	Alison Veness	Episode: "Kith and Kill"
2002	The Queen's Nose	Maria	Episode: "Series 6, Episode 4"
2003	Happiness	Denise Doyle	Recurring role; 2 episodes
2003	The Vice	Mrs. Holmes	Episode: "Outcast"
2003–2004	Family Affairs	DC Cheryl Barker	Recurring role; 22 episodes
2005	Holby City	Annie Fell	Episode: "It's Kinda Rock'n'Roll"
2005	EastEnders	Trisha Taylor	Recurring role; 11 episodes
2005	Doctor Who	Mum	Episode: "The Christmas Invasion"
2006	Vital Signs	Fertility Nurse	Episode: "Episode 4"
2006	Ghostly Encounters	Sophia	Episode: "When Folk Tales Come True"
2006	Extras	Nurse	Episode: "Jonathan Ross"
2006	Casualty 1900s	Mrs. Sarah Hills	Episode: "Casualty 1906"
2007	Holby City	Carole Morgan	Recurring role; 2 episodes
2007	Gina's Laughing Gear	Mum	Episode: "Life in the Underpass"
2008	Doctors	DI Sarah Lane	Episode: "What's Love Got to Do with It?"
2008	The Revenge Files of Alistair Fury	Dr. Tara Lyer	Episode: "Alice in the Middle"
2008	Cold Blood	Hardman's Mother	Episode: "Immortal"
2009	The Bill	Emma Dowson	Episode: "Feet of Clay: Part 3"
2010	The Increasingly Poor Decisions of Todd Margaret	Woman Crying in Pub	Episode: "In Which Claims Are Made and a Journey Ensues"
2010	Shameless	D'Reen	Episode: "From Chatsworth to Cuba"
2010	The Bill	Daisy Harris	Episode: "Protect & Serve"
2010	Harry & Paul		Episode: "Series 3, Episode 6"
2010–2011	EastEnders	Julie Perkins	Series regular; 55 episodes
2012	Holby City	Jan Cheshire	Episode: "Fault Lines"
2014	Holby City	Luisa Stevenson	Recurring role; 2 episodes
2015	Doctors	Muriel Hicks	Episode: "The Bingo Conspiracy"
2015	River	Marlena Fielding	Episode: "Episode 1"
2016	The Increasingly Poor Decisions of Todd Margaret	Lonely Divorcee	Episode: "The Decisions of Todd Margaret"
2017	Fearless	Beth Simms	Miniseries; 5 episodes
2019	Summer of Rockets	Doreen	Miniseries; 3 episodes
2020	Holby City	Tracey McKendrick	Recurring role; 6 episodes
2020	I Hate Suzie	Lila	Episode: "Guilt"
2021	The Larkins	Glenda	Episode: "In Which Pop and Ma Go on Holiday"
2022	This Is Going to Hurt	Harry's Mum	Episode: "Episode 5"
2022	Doctors	DS Mandy Jameson	Episode: "The Innocent Sleep"
2023	Still Up	Nikki	Episode: "The Dress"
2025	Casualty	Sheila Addison	Episode: "Jodie"
