= Funland (TV series) =

- DVD Cover of Funland
- Genre: Comedy drama
- Created by: Jeremy Dyson; Simon Ashdown
- Starring: Daniel Mays; Kris Marshall; Burn Gorman; Sarah Smart; Ian Puleston-Davies; Judy Parfitt; Kenny Doughty; Frances Barber; Roy Barraclough; Paul Courtenay Hyu
- Country of origin: United Kingdom
- No. of episodes: 11

Production
- Executive producer: Kenton Allen
- Producer: Sanne Wohlenberg
- Production location: Blackpool
- Editors: Tony Cranstoun; Emer Reynolds; Mark Elliot
- Running time: 1x50 minutes 10x30 minutes

Original release
- Network: BBC Three
- Release: 23 October – 7 November 2005

Funland is a British eleven-part television comedy thriller, produced by the BBC that was first screened from 23 October 2005 to 7 November 2005, on the digital channel BBC Three. Created by Jeremy Dyson (of The League of Gentlemen) and Simon Ashdown, the series consists of a fifty-minute opening episode followed by ten half-hour instalments.

== Plot ==
A prudish couple, Dudley (Kris Marshall) and Lola (Sarah Smart), arrive in Blackpool by bus from Stoke-on-Trent, and find themselves in a seedy boarding house run by the sinister Leo Finch (Philip Jackson). At the same time Carter Krantz (Daniel Mays) arrives from London, thrown out of a car naked and carrying only a key and a piece of paper with the name "Ambrose Chapel". He thinks that this is a man responsible for his mother's murder, but after roughing up an innocent taxidermist, Ambrose Chapfel, (Mark Gatiss), he discovers it is actually a disused church, now a nightclub called "Sins" which is run by Shirley Woolf (Ian Puleston-Davies). Shirley and his second wife Connie (Frances Barber) are in conflict with Shirley's mother Mercy (Judy Parfitt), a wheelchair user and owner of a lapdancing club. Meanwhile, the mayor of Blackpool, Onan Van Kneck (Roy Barraclough) has launched a campaign to clean up the town, but is constantly harangued by journalist Ken Cryer (Simon Greenall), who accuses Van Kneck himself of corruption.

On his first night in Blackpool, Dudley is inveigled by Finch into joining a game of poker, where he loses £3,000. When he says that he is penniless, Finch tells him that his wife will have to earn the money for him. Lola is forced to become a stripper at Mercy's club. Initially terrified, she discovers both that she is good at it and that she enjoys it. Later, Shirley Woolf offers her £1,000 for sex. Dudley encourages her to do it, and stays to watch in case she needs him to intervene, but is upset when he sees that she enjoys it more than she ever enjoyed sex with him. Krantz links up with Cryer, who says he can get information on Ambrose Chapel. When he goes to meet Cryer, however, he finds his things strewn over the beach and, under a bucket, his head. His only clue, once again, is a scrap of paper that says "Malcolm Carpet". Mercy holds a birthday party, which Shirley and Connie are obliged to attend. While another son, Willie (Brian Hibbard) is performing a magic trick, Mercy tortures Shirley by reminding him that it was while he was watching this, his favourite trick, that his father drowned in the bath. After Connie tells her she is pregnant, she puts on a "party mix" tape that is actually a recording of Shirley having sex with one of the lapdancers. Krantz sees "Malcolm Carpet" on one of Willie's old posters, and Willie tells him that that was the stage name of Leo Finch.

Mercy, who has engaged Krantz to offer his services to Shirley in order to spy on him, calls him into her office to demand a report. During their conversation, she tells him that his mother had lived with her in Blackpool, that her name was not Frannie Krantz but Frannie Poole (she had taken her pseudonym from a conductor named Otto Krantz) and that she had left following a rape. Kranz goes to Finch and accuses him of the rape, but Finch says that it was his brother, Van Kneck, and that Krantz is the product of that rape. Krantz goes to Van Kneck and holds him at gunpoint, but Van Kneck tells him that he cannot be his father, because he has had prosthetic testicles from the age of ten. Meanwhile, Van Kneck and Shirley have teamed up to deal with Mercy, and Van Kneck has employed the services of two Finnish brothers. The first brother (Ewan Bailey) arrives and is treated to a cabaret and drinks, but makes extravagant demands, including a girl. He picks Lola out of a brochure of Mercy's girls. Lola at first agrees to have sex with him, but once in the room changes her mind. When he tries to rape her, she takes up his gun and shoots him in the head, chest and foot. In a panic, because the second brother is due, Shirley and Kranz decide they have to allow him to be seen, apparently alive, and then fake his death in a drowning accident. This is a problem because he has two bullet wounds in the head and half his foot is blown off, but the taxidermist Ambrose Chapfel comes to the rescue, and they are able to carry off the deception.

Shirley asks Dudley if Lola is likely to go to the police and Dudley, in a funk, says that she might. Shirley then takes her off with the intention of killing her, but at the last moment decides to spare her. When he gets home, he finds that there has been an explosion. It was caused by his son Liam (Kenny Doughty), but Connie tells him that it was Mercy, and that he has to kill her. When he goes to her office, it is revealed that he had sex with his mother as a teenager, and has never got over her. Lola goes back to the boarding house to confront Dudley, and leaves with Krantz, who happens to be at the front door. Together they investigate another of Cryer's possible leads, the mysterious Bridewell Holdings. On going to the company's office, Krantz receives a message to be in a certain hotel suite at a certain hour. He and Lola go, but are abducted by two men and brought to the beach where the older of the two questions Krantz about "the relic", which apparently refers to the key that his mother gave him, and about the "little fellow", which Krantz does not understand, but which is apparently a reference to Bridewell. The two gunmen get into a row which results in the older one killing the younger one, and Krantz gets the drop on the older one and asks him who he is working for. He tells him it is Mercy, and that it was Mercy that killed his mother. He takes the killer at gunpoint to Mercy's office. Mercy tells him that she had not ordered the man to kill him, only to fetch him. She then tells him that she is his real mother, and that Shirley is his father. Frannie had found them once in the crypt of Ambrose Chapel. After Mercy had tried to drown her three-month-old baby, Frannie had taken him and vanished, taking as well something very precious: a key to the chapel, where she had placed something of great value. Mercy had burned down the chapel, bought it up and, using Finch as a middle-man, sold it to Shirley.

Krantz goes to the boarding house looking for Lola and, failing to find her there, goes to Shirley's office and finds him with Lola, trying to persuade her to make a life with him. He confronts Shirley with the fact that he is his son, and produces the key, asking where the crypt is. Shirley smashes the wood panelling in his office to reveal the crypt, and inside is a safe. Just as they unlock the safe, the lights go out and Lola and the contents of the safe are snatched. Shirley and Krantz head for Blackpool Tower, where a ball organized by Mercy is in full swing. They are refused entry because all male guests have to wear gorilla costumes. Eventually, having put on costumes, they find Lola and Mercy on the top platform of the tower, with the bag from the safe. Mercy holds them all at gunpoint. The bag contains a teddy-bear hot water bottle, which Mercy's father gave to Frannie as a child, and whose name is Bridewell. In Bridewell's neck is the title deed to Blackpool Beach. With this in her possession, Mercy expects to become very rich. Lola grabs the document from her, but loses it to the wind, which blows it high into the tower's framework. Both men, in their gorilla costumes, begin to climb the tower. Mercy stands up from her wheelchair and struggles with Lola, then shoots one of the "gorillas", who falls to his death on the road below. It is revealed to be Shirley. Krantz has Mercy locked up in Chapfel's basement, then goes walking on the beach with Lola, carrying the deed. Lola asks him what he is going to do, but he does not answer.

== Filming and Production Notes ==
- Produced by Sanne Wohlenberg, the series is directed by Dearbhla Walsh, Susan Tully and Brian Kirk, and filmed on location in Blackpool, the town in which the programme is also set.
- Funland was nominated for a BAFTA (2006) in the "Best Drama Serial" category, but was beaten by Bleak House.
- A scene involving Mercy and the Mayor is filmed on the Big Dipper ride at Pleasure Beach Blackpool.

== Cast ==
- Daniel Mays – Carter Krantz
- Kris Marshall – Dudley Sutton
- Sarah Smart – Lola Sutton
- Ian Puleston-Davies – Shirley Woolf
- Judy Parfitt – Mercy Woolf
- Frances Barber – Connie Woolf
- Roy Barraclough – The Mayor
- Mark Gatiss – Ambrose Chapfel
- Cheryl Campbell – Valerie Hinchcliffe (Lola's Mum)
- Ewan Bailey – The Finn
- Burn Gorman - Tim Timothy
- Emily Aston - Ruby Woolf
- Kenny Doughty - Liam Woolf
- Ryan Pope - Chris Church
- Philip Jackson - Leo Finch
- Beth Cordingly - Vienna Keen
- Kevin Eldon - Shadowman
- Simon Greenall - Ken Cryer
- Paul Courtenay Hyu - Bryan Luke
- Katrina Rafferty - The Teddy Picker Girl
- Jason Watkins - Bradley Stainer
- Brian Hibbard - Willy Woolf

== Episodes ==
No.	Title	Directed by	Written by	Original release date
1	"Episode One"	Dearbhla Walsh	Jeremy Dyson & Simon Ashdown	23 October 2005
Double-length episode. Carter Krantz has arrived in Blackpool, naked and only with a key and a piece of paper. He starts to go through the city, running into all kinds of people. Dudley Sutton and his wife Lola try to spice up their relationship and discover more than expected. Shirley and Mercy get into an argument about their family, revealing several secrets.
2	"Episode Two"	Dearbhla Walsh	Jeremy Dyson & Simon Ashdown	24 October 2005
Lola has to realise what it really means to pay off her husband's debt. Things get even worse for her when Dudley comes along. Connie finally confessed to Shirley and they agree to get rid of Mercy.
3	"Episode Three"	Dearbhla Walsh	Jeremy Dyson & Simon Ashdown	24 October 2005
The negotiations between the mayor and Mercy get out of hand and result in a showdown of corruption. Carter asks Ken Cryer for help, but the things Ken reveals put Carter in serious danger.
4	"Episode Four"	Susan Tully	Jeremy Dyson & Simon Ashdown	30 October 2005
Lola starts having fun as lap dancer. Her passion isn't satisfied by Dudley any more. The Woolf family gathers for Mercy's birthday where again, secrets get revealed and new wars start. Carter learns that Malcolm Carpet might be involved in his mother's death.
5	"Episode Five"	Susan Tully	Jeremy Dyson & Simon Ashdown	30 October 2005
Shirley is kicked out by Connie and runs into Lola. She and Dudley try to get him to pay their debt but Shirley is not as honest as he looks. The mayor tries to finalise a deal to get rid of Mercy but fails for now.
6	"Episode Six"	Susan Tully	Jeremy Dyson & Simon Ashdown	31 October 2005
Carter continues searching for his mother's murders but realises two hitmen are tracking him. He turns to Mercy for help and she provides it. The mayor tries to get rid of Mercy once again.
7	"Episode Seven"	Susan Tully	Jeremy Dyson & Simon Ashdown	31 October 2005
Connie tries to get Shirley to stand up against Mercy. Carter helps Lola but where is Dudley in this situation? He is getting jealous and calls Lola's mother for help.
8	"Episode Eight"	Brian Kirk	Jeremy Dyson & Simon Ashdown	6 November 2005
Carter has a new lead and suddenly faces the mayor, who is preparing to leave town. Lola is in more and more danger every day. Her mother goes out with Leo instead of providing help to her daughter.
9	"Episode Nine"	Brian Kirk	Jeremy Dyson & Simon Ashdown	6 November 2005
Ruby is planning her wedding and Liam tries to reunite with his rock band. Connie tries to get Shirley to get rid of Mercy and put an end to her power. Carter learns that he has to find Bridewell to get the answers he searches for. The problem: Who is Bridewell?
10	"Episode Ten"	Brian Kirk	Jeremy Dyson & Simon Ashdown	7 November 2005
Carter finally gets closer to an answer but what is his key for? And what's up with Shirley?
11	"Episode Eleven"	Brian Kirk	Jeremy Dyson & Simon Ashdown	7 November 2005
Things rise to a huge and dramatic end and the most exclusive location in Blackpool, the Blackpool Tower. The man with the monkey mask is finally found and his face revealed, but for many of the people involved, the sight isn't pretty.

== DVD releases ==
The complete boxset was released in 2006.

DVD	Release date
The Complete First Series (2 discs)	26 June 2006
