= Linal Haft =

English actor

- Born: 23 March 1945 (age 81); Leeds, England
- Other name: Lionel Haft
- Occupation: Actor
- Years active: 1968–present
- Notable work: Roger and the Rottentrolls (1997); EastEnders (2010–2011)

Linal Haft (born 23 March 1945) is an English actor, best known for playing controlling or manipulative characters in both film and television, most notably his role as businessman Harry Gold in the popular BBC soap opera EastEnders from 2010 to 2011. He is sometimes credited as Lionel Haft.

== Biography ==
Haft made his acting debut in an episode of Homicide as Harry Bruce in 1968. He went on to play his second role later the same year, as Adams in an episode of Contrabandits. From 1968 to 1978, he had many more roles, including Curly in an episode of Riptide (1969); Don in an episode of The Squirrels (1976); as the blackmailer and hard-man Brian Frederick Fischer in The Sweeney episode "Money, Money, Money" (1977) and as Cookson in two episodes of Armchair Thriller (1978). He appeared as Monty Fish in the second series of ITV's post-war comedy drama Shine on Harvey Moon in 1982. Haft also appeared in an episode of Dempsey and Makepeace. He appeared in three separate episodes of The Bill (1985, 1998 and 2007), portraying a different character in each. Haft accepted the role of Reno in the 2006 thriller film Solo.

Haft portrayed Harry Gold in the British soap opera EastEnders, from 23 June 2010 until late November 2010. He returned on 29 August.

In February 2013 he played Joseph Lavender in the BBC One drama series Ripper Street.

In 2023, Linal appeared as American Navy deserter Petty Officer Frank Doherty in NCIS: Sydney Series 1 Episode 4 – Ghosted.

He, Frank Mills and Paul Brooke are the only actors to appear in both the classic and new versions of Minder, but starring in different roles in each.

== Theatre ==
His live work includes his much lauded performance as Arnold Beckoff, the Harvey Fierstein role, in the groundbreaking A.I.D.S. and LGBT play, Torch Song Trilogy.

== Selected filmography ==
- I, Claudius (1976)
- Jesus of Nazareth (TV series) (1977)
- The Sweeney (1977)
- Sexton Blake and the Demon God (1978)
- Birth of the Beatles (1979)
- Comedians (BBC) (1979)
- Minder (1982)
- The Professionals:

A Man Called Quinn (1983)

- Matlock season 2 episode 2
- The Bill (1985–2009)
- Shine On Harvey Moon (1982–4)
- First Among Equals (1986)
- Escape from Sobibor (1987)
- The Charmer (1987)
- Roger and the Rottentrolls series 2 episode 9 (1997)
- Soft Fruit (1999)
- The Three Stooges (2000)
- Moulin Rouge! (2001)
- He Died with a Felafel in His Hand (2001)
- The Man Who Sued God (2001)
- Liquid Bridge (2003)
- The Incredible Journey of Mary Bryant (2005)
- Solo (2006)
- Tu£sday (2008)
- EastEnders (2010–2011)
- New Tricks (2011)
- Frozen Moments (2011)
- Naked Before the World (2011)
- Death (2012)
- Doctors (2020)
- NCIS: Sydney (2023)
