= Simon Ashdown =

British television writer

Simon Ashdown is a British television writer, best known as being a BAFTA award-nominated EastEnders writer.

== Career ==
From 1995 to 2013, Ashdown was series consultant and lead writer on EastEnders. He was involved in the creation of the Slater family, and along with other writers, developed the characters around the actors themselves, rather than the other way round. He created the character of Max Branning and was responsible for numerous key episodes such as Ethel Skinner's death, Stacey Slater's bipolar and the "Who Killed Archie?" storyline. In 2010 he wrote the twenty fifth anniversary live episode, "EastEnders Live". More recent episodes that he has written include Pat Evans' death, Mandy Salter's second exit, Janine Butcher's temporary exit, the aftermath of David Wicks' return and the Jake Stone and Sadie Young reveal. He returned to EastEnders to write the Christmas 2017 episode which saw Tanya Branning return and Abi Branning and Lauren Branning fall from a rooftop. He then returned to write the Christmas 2018 episodes, in which Hayley Slater pushes Alfie Moon down the stairs and he then kidnaps their daughter, Cherry Slater. He returned to EastEnders in December 2019 and in September 2020, to write the climax of Linda Carter's battle with alcoholism and Chantelle Atkins's death at the hands of husband Gray Atkins, respectively. In January 2021 he wrote the episode of Ian Beale's departure and the following month, he wrote the departing episode of Max Branning.

Alongside his work on EastEnders, he also wrote and co-created, with Jeremy Dyson of The League of Gentlemen, the innovative drama Funland which was nominated for the Best Drama Serial BAFTA in 2006. He wrote the two-part drama Kitchen starring Eddie Izzard and Perfect for Film Four, directed by Rankin and starring Marc Warren. He has worked on numerous other drama series including City Central, Casualty and has acted as story consultant on numerous productions including Crash Palace for Sky and Come Fly With Me for the BBC. He recently adapted Franz Kafka's The Trial with Jeremy Dyson for the BBC.

The RTÉ series Raw is based on Kitchen and is currently in its fourth season.

== Writing credits ==
Production	Notes	Broadcaster
EastEnders	153 episodes (1995–2013, 2017–present)	BBC One
EastEnders: E20	Teen drama	BBC Two Northern Ireland & BBC Four
Casualty	"Nightfall" (1996)	BBC One
City Central	"A Night on the Town" (1998)	BBC One
EastEnders: Ricky & Bianca	Television film (2002)	BBC One
Perfect	Short film (2003)	N/A
Holby City	"Hair of the Dog" (2003)	BBC One
Funland	11 episodes (co-written with Jeremy Dyson, 2005)	BBC Three
Kitchen	Television film (2007)	Channel 5
Come Fly with Me	6 episodes (story consultant, 2010–2011)	BBC One
"EastEnders: Phil on Remand"	Mini-episode (series consultant, 2012)	BBC Red Button
"EastEnders: Billy's Olympic Nightmare"	Mini-episode (series consultant, 2012)	BBC Red Button
"EastEnders: All I Want for Christmas"	Mini-episode (series consultant, 2012)	BBC Red Button
"EastEnders: T&B 4Eva"	Mini-episode (series consultant, 2012)	BBC Red Button

== Awards and nominations ==
Year	Award	Work	Category	Result
2006	British Academy Television Awards	Funland	Best Drama Serial (with Kenton Allen, Jeremy Dyson and Sanne Wohlenberg)	Nominated
2008	British Soap Award	EastEnders (the aftermath of Max Branning and Stacey Branning's affair)	Best Storyline (with Charlie Clements, Jo Joyner, Lacey Turner and Jake Wood)	Won
2009	British Soap Award	EastEnders (Bianca discovers Tony is a paedophile)	Best Storyline	Nominated
2010	British Soap Award	EastEnders: "Who Killed Archie?"	Best Storyline	Won
2011	British Soap Award	EastEnders (Billie Jackson's death)	Best Single Episode	Nominated
2011	Writers' Guild of Great Britain Award	EastEnders: "Dot's Impossible Decision"	Best Continuing Drama	Nominated
2012	British Soap Award	EastEnders	Special Achievement	Won
2012	British Soap Award	EastEnders (Pat Evans's death)	Best Single Episode (with Pam St. Clement and Jennie Darnell)	Nominated
2012	British Soap Award	EastEnders (The Brannings deal with Tanya's cancer diagnosis)	Best Storyline	Nominated
2013	British Soap Award	EastEnders (The demise of Derek Branning)	Best Exit (with Jamie Foreman and Jennie Darnell)	Nominated
2013	British Soap Award	EastEnders (The identity of Kat's lover is revealed)	Best Single Episode (with Karl Neilson)	Nominated
2013	British Soap Award	EastEnders (The demise of Derek Branning)	Best Storyline	Nominated
