= Eddie Moon =

UK soap opera character, created 2011

- EastEnders character
- Portrayed by: David Essex
- First appearance: Episode 4223; 3 June 2011
- Last appearance: Episode 4295; 6 October 2011
- Introduced by: Bryan Kirkwood
In-universe information
- Occupation: Antiques dealer
- Wife: Maggie Moon (backstory); Colleen Moon (backstory)
- Sons: Michael Moon; Craig Moon; Anthony Moon; Tyler Moon
- Daughters: Francesca Moon
- Grandsons: Tommy Moon
- Granddaughters: Scarlett Butcher
- Other relatives: Alfie Moon

Eddie Moon is a fictional character from the BBC soap opera EastEnders, played by David Essex. Eddie is the father of Michael (Steve John Shepherd), Tyler (Tony Discipline) and Anthony Moon (Matt Lapinskas). Along with his children, Eddie was introduced to bring a "new generation" of the Moon family to the programme. Essex began filming in April 2011 and first appeared on screen on 3 June 2011. His initial contract ended in August, and Essex hoped he would be able to return to the role. The character has been described as cheeky, likeable and charismatic, and has a dark past. Through the series' narrative, it is revealed that there is a rift between Michael and Eddie, because Michael blames his father for the death of his mother, who killed herself when Michael was left alone with her. Eddie is also a love interest for Carol Jackson (Lindsey Coulson) and Vanessa Gold (Zöe Lucker).

Critics have responded mostly positively to the character. Tony Stewart from the Daily Mirror praised his "grand entrance" to the series, and a reporter from the Evening Chronicle said Eddie would bring a "breath of fresh air" to the soap. However, Jim Shelley from the Daily Mirror branded the character a "cliche". The character was written out in September 2011 and departed on 6 October 2011.

== Development ==
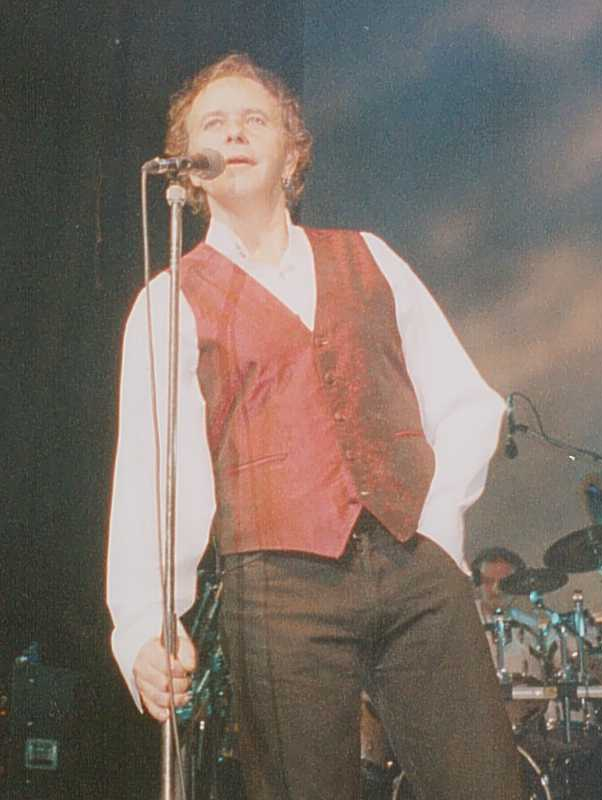
David Essex (pictured) was originally cast to play Jack Edwards but was unavailable at the time.

=== Creation ===
On 24 January 2011, it was announced that Essex had been cast in the role of Eddie, the father of Michael Moon (Steve John Shepherd). It was stated that Eddie's other children would arrive after him, and his "fractured" relationship with Michael would be explored. Of his role, Essex said, "Being an East-Ender myself, I'm really excited to be joining the Square. Eddie Moon is a great character and I can't wait to get to grips with the role and work with such a fantastic cast. I'm really pleased that I've been able to make filming work around my tour dates this time." Executive producer Bryan Kirkwood said that Essex would "bring warmth and charisma to the role of Eddie Moon" and added that Eddie and the return of Michael will bring "a new generation of the Moon family to Walford." Essex had been cast as Jack Edwards six years previously, but withdrew from the role due to a clash with his touring schedule. He revealed "[T]he character [...] wasn't as interesting as this one. I think we would've made something out of it, but there's much more texture and weight to this." On 27 February 2011, Essex told Elaine Paige on Sunday that he would start filming as Eddie in April and that the character and his storylines were being brainstormed. He revealed that his initial contract would end in August 2011 and although he could stay on longer, he said there are other acting and touring projects "pulling me out of EastEnders, but emotionally, I'm here." He later revealed that Eddie would remain on screen until October. He hoped that he could return and become a regular returning character, joking that he would be an "occasional Mooner", but later he ruled out a return to the show. He said that joining the cast was "daunting" and a "great adventure" that was "taking over [his] life", and because he was writing a film score at the same time as filming for EastEnders, it was "tricky" and he found it difficult to adjust.

Eddie's sons, Tyler (Tony Discipline) and Anthony (Matt Lapinskas), were announced on 10 May 2011, and Kirwood said that the Moon family were "on their way to becoming an established family in the Square." Kirkwood later said, "[Essex] is a legend in his own right. I can't wait for the audience reaction when he hits the screens in a few weeks. I'm hoping viewers come to love him." Essex said that he was determined to show off his acting skills and explained: "It's important to me that Eddie is a character and not David Essex. Because of my track record it might be difficult for some people to differentiate the two, and that's going to be a challenge. But my fans are thrilled I've joined EastEnders—it means that they get to see me on the telly rather than waiting for my next tour!" However, Essex admitted, "Eddie Moon is not a million miles from David Essex", saying that he had tweaked the character's accent and had brought some of himself into the role. Essex made his first on-screen appearance in the episode broadcast on 3 June 2011.

=== Characterisation ===
Eddie is described as a "loveable rogue" who is cheeky, likeable and charismatic. The EastEnders website says he has a dark past that he is trying to escape, and calls him a polite gentleman who makes friends for life, and is popular with the ladies. Essex said that when Eddie was younger, he would have been a "mirror image" of Michael, but has since become more philosophical, and is less hot headed than Michael. Essex told Digital Spy that Eddie is "a strong character", who is an ex-boxer. Essex said Eddie's chequered past would unfold and opined that "He's not a bad guy". He also explained that Eddie is separated from his wife, and that Tyler and Anthony are Michael's half brothers. Eddie works as an antiques dealer and also has a daughter, Francesca, referred to as Frankie in the series.

=== Relationships with other characters ===
Essex has said that there is a "massive rift" between Eddie and his estranged son, Michael. He explained: "When [Eddie] arrives, he has no idea that Michael is around! Eddie and Michael haven't really spoken for years, but as a father does, Eddie reaches out and reaches out, trying to mend that." Essex opined that Eddie and Michael may be quite similar, but Eddie would not be as manipulative as "the ages are different—with age comes a certain attitude for Eddie that's a bit more philosophical and not so hot-headed." It was revealed by Inside Soap that the rift between Michael and Eddie is because Michael's mother committed suicide and Michael found her body but he is convinced that Eddie killed her. Essex confirmed that Michael blames Eddie for the death.

Eddie and Carol meet in Eddie's second episode when he arrives in Walford and she hits him with her car. Essex explained: "Afterwards, Eddie and Carol have a bit of a discussion about that—she reckons that she just nudged him, but he reckons that she hit him! We see Eddie get thrown up into the air in that scene. I've done my own stunts for films in the past, but I didn't do that one!" Carol is flattered when Eddie makes a move on her and their relationship could develop at a later time. Essex told Soaplife: "There's a spark between [Eddie] and Carol. He starts off pushing her away but they get closer when he helps out with Liam. Carol thanks Eddie and he kisses her."

== Storylines ==
Eddie is first seen reading a newspaper mentioning his second cousin Alfie Moon (Shane Richie) and decides to visit as he has not seen him for 15 years and wants to see Alfie's son, Tommy, but is hit by Carol Jackson's (Lindsey Coulson) car outside The Queen Victoria public house while saving Amy Mitchell (Amelie Conway). When he comes to, he argues with Carol and Kat Moon (Jessie Wallace) asks who he is. At that point, Alfie enters and recognises Eddie. Kat does not want Eddie to stay as she does not want him to know that Eddie's son, Michael (Steve John Shepherd), is Tommy's biological father. Michael sees Eddie in the pub but leaves immediately as he does not want to speak to him. Alfie later tells Eddie that Tommy is his grandson.

The next day, Eddie and Carol talk but he defends his son when she says she thinks Michael has a mean streak. He gives Kat some money for Tommy before leaving but does not go far and bonds with Carol's grandson, Liam Butcher (James Forde). Kat finds Eddie and invites him to stay. They visit Michael's boxing club where he tells Michael that he should have told him Tommy is his grandson. Michael, however, gives Eddie money and tells him to take his family far away. Eddie asks what it will take for him to get over what happened, and later tells Michael's girlfriend Roxy Mitchell (Rita Simons) that he does not remember why they fell out. Roxy and Eddie bond and Michael is annoyed. Michael repeatedly tells Eddie to stay away from him, Tommy and Roxy but Kat tells him he can stay for as long as he wants. Michael tells Roxy that Eddie murdered his mother, Maggie. Eddie confirms this but says he was not there when she died but left Michael with her (he was then 6 years old), knowing he shouldn't. She died of an overdose and Michael blames him. He later helps Carol fix a blocked sink at the café and she invites him for tea after he bonds further with Liam. Liam skips school and Eddie helps him with a hobby. Carol is annoyed that Liam did not go to school but thanks Eddie for spending time with Liam by kissing him. Eddie's son, Tyler (Tony Discipline), arrives in Walford and makes Eddie miss meeting Michael to try to make amends. Michael refuses to accept Eddie's apology.

Eddie sends Kat and Alfie on holiday to Spain and runs the pub in their absence. He teaches Liam about antiques but considers returning to Upton Park as he hasn't seen anywhere to move his business to. When Carol discovers that Eddie has allowed Liam to skip school, they argue and Carol tells him to stay away from her and Liam. Eddie discovers that someone is squatting in a local lock-up and decides to take over the premises. Eddie asks Liam to watch his stock, which he leaves in the gardens. Eddie's son, Anthony (Matt Lapinskas), poses as a member of the council to force the squatter out. Eddie returns to find his stock on fire and cannot extinguish the flames. He confronts Michael, thinking he started the fire, but Lola Pearce (Danielle Harold) told Liam that she was responsible in revenge for comments Anthony and Tyler made about her grandfather Billy Mitchell (Perry Fenwick). Eddie finds out it was Lola and confronts her. Eddie and Michael seemingly make amends but Eddie is unaware that Michael has a plan. He later gets a letter that intrigues Jean Slater (Gillian Wright) and she becomes fascinated by Eddie. When she tells him she knows his secret, that he wears silk underwear, Eddie assumes she read the letter and shouts at her. Eddie moves into a house on Albert Square and tells Michael that he likes Carol. They are set up by Eddie's sons to spend time alone and are caught under a blanket by Tyler and Anthony.

When Vanessa Gold (Zöe Lucker) is humiliated after Max Branning's (Jake Wood) affair with his ex-wife Tanya Jessop (Jo Joyner), Eddie is kind to her and Michael takes the opportunity to pay Vanessa to break Eddie's heart and she accepts. Eventually, Eddie and Vanessa sleep together but she starts to like him for real. She finds out Tyler is entering an unlicensed boxing match, and tells Eddie. Despite his anger, he supports Tyler after Michael convinces him there will be a proper doctor and referee present. Carol sees Eddie and Vanessa together, and after Tyler wins the fight, he collapses and suffers a seizure. Eddie then finds out that Anthony bet £8,000 from the business on Tyler to lose. Eddie tells Anthony he wishes Anthony was the one in hospital instead of Tyler. When Eddie speaks to Michael, Michael blames Eddie for the events because Tyler worships his father. Michael then tells Eddie he knows about Eddie's other child after finding a photograph of Eddie, a woman and a baby with a date of birth on the back, and says that Eddie cheated on his mother, causing her to kill herself. Eddie then speaks to Carol and she rejects him, calling him a monster for cheating with Vanessa. Eddie then promises Michael he will tell him the truth about everything. It transpires that Maggie had hoped Michael would find her and save her life. Michael and Eddie then make amends until Vanessa, with whom Eddie now has a relationship, reveals that Michael paid her to break his heart and arranged Tyler's fight so Tyler would end up hurt. Eddie later reveals this to Tyler and Anthony, who turn against Michael, and Michael is left distraught. Eddie convinces Vanessa to steal cash from Michael, planning to move to Spain with his family. However, Tyler and Anthony refuse to leave and Eddie dumps Vanessa, telling her the police are looking for her. Eddie then collects Craig and they go to Spain to meet Frankie, Eddie's daughter. Several months later, it is mentioned that Eddie has no money. He also refuses to attend Michael's wedding to Janine Butcher (Charlie Brooks) in June 2012 or Michael's funeral in November 2013.

== Reception ==
Tony Stewart from the Daily Mirror also positively reviewed Eddie's arrival in Albert Square, saying, "Dressed in a smart, black three-piece whistle and flute [suit] and a white button-down collar shirt, the dapper grey-haired man looks like he could have been a guest at a Big, Fat Gypsy Wedding. But within four minutes of arriving in Albert Square on Monday, he's been knocked over by Carol's car as he snatches Roxy's toddler Amy from its path. Although there have been reports that this newcomer has been banned from singing in the Vic, within 15 minutes he's croaking out a line from the Leyton Orient supporters' song. This is the grand entrance of former 70s teen idol David Essex[.]" Conversely, Jim Shelley, also from the Daily Mirror, criticised Eddie's arrival, saying, "on Monday they blessed us with the arrival of Whispering David Essex as Eddie Moon, the latest example of the Long-Lost Relative Who Has Never Been Mentioned Before that is routine in soaps nowadays. [...] Eddie had been in EastEnders three whole minutes before the writers unleashed the bi-annual cliche of The Mean & Moody New Guy Saving A Child Running Out In Front Of A Car. [...] Eddie spent the week ticking off the components of that great EastEnders cliche, the 'rough diamond'/silver-tongued 'ladies' man.' (See also Dennis Watts, Michael Moon, Johnny Allen, Max & Jack Branning, Steve Owen et al.)" A reporter from the Metro called the character "mischievous", and another from the Evening Chronicle called him "a pleasant, charming character", adding "It seems as if a little bit of Essex will brighten up the East End for a while. [...] [A]s far as I can tell, [he] will be a breath of fresh air in a soap that sometimes forgets to have a laugh."

Inside Soap held a poll to see which of the new Moon family members, Eddie, Tyler or Anthony, its readers were most looking forward to seeing. Eddie came first in the poll with 74% of the votes. Sarah Ellis from Inside Soap praised Eddie, saying, "If there's one thing EastEnders has been missing recently, it's a strong patriarch to go up against Walford's gobby ladies. Enter David Essex as charming Eddie Moon—whose presence has caused something of a stir among [viewers]." A critic for the Daily Record admitted they were wrong about the character and Essex's casting, writing "We may have had some misgivings about the casting of ageing former heart-throb David Essex as Alfie's uncle Eddie, but he's proving to be one of the soap's brightest elements. Eddie has already done the impossible – he's managed to put a smile on the ever-miserable Carol Jackson's face, and even cheered up Kat and Alfie by sending them on a much needed holiday to Spain with little Tommy."
