= Tyler Moon =

Fictional character from EastEnders

- EastEnders character
- Portrayed by: Tony Discipline
- Duration: 2011–2013
- First appearance: Episode 4236; 27 June 2011
- Last appearance: Episode 4687; 6 August 2013
- Introduced by: Bryan Kirkwood
- Spin-off appearances: "All I Want for Christmas" (2012)
In-universe information
- Occupation: Antiques salesman Market trader
- Father: Eddie Moon
- Mother: Colleen Moon
- Brothers: Anthony Moon
- Sisters: Francesca Moon
- Half-brothers: Michael Moon; Craig Moon
- Nephews: Tommy Moon
- Nieces: Scarlett Butcher
- Other relatives: Alfie Moon

Tyler Moon is a fictional character from the BBC soap opera EastEnders, played by Tony Discipline. Tyler is the son of Eddie Moon (David Essex), half brother of Michael (Steve John Shepherd) and Craig Moon (Elliot Rosen), brother of Anthony Moon (Matt Lapinskas) and cousin of Alfie Moon (Shane Richie). He made his first appearance in the episode broadcast on 27 June 2011.

Tyler, along with brother Anthony, were both announced as new characters in May 2011, being played by Discipline and Lapinskas respectively, though Tyler made his debut at an earlier date. Described as having a short fuse and "quick to use his fist to sort things out", Tyler begins boxing and when half brother Michael pushes him to do an unlicensed fight, Tyler agrees, unbeknown to Tyler that Michael is fixing the fight, putting a boxer in the ring who once killed a man. Tyler wins the fight, though suffers a seizure and undergoes life saving operations.

Other than this, he is described as a "heart-throb" and "ladykiller". When Tyler first arrives, he chats up a number of girls and even kisses Roxy Mitchell (Rita Simons). Tyler later starts dating Whitney Dean (Shona McGarty), though their relationship suffers badly due to Whitney's past. A love triangle begins to develop between Tyler, Whitney and Fatboy (Ricky Norwood). When Whitney chooses Fatboy, Tyler has a one-night stand with Lauren Branning (Jacqueline Jossa), though later regrets it after finding out that Whitney still has feelings for him. Discipline later left the soap and Tyler last appeared on 6 August 2013.

== Creation and development ==
=== Casting ===
The character was announced on 10 May 2011, along with Anthony, and made his first appearance on 27 June 2011. Discipline heard about the part in November 2010 from his agent, so decided to audition and returned two weeks later for a workshop. At the workshop, there were six actors shortlisted to play Tyler and six shortlisted to play Anthony. The actors were paired off and Discipline was paired with Lapinskas. A month later, Discipline attended a screen test, and after a further screen test, he found out he had got the part. Discipline said of his casting: "It's really exciting to be able to work on a show that you have grown up watching and have followed your whole life. I am very grateful to be given this opportunity and am looking forward to working on the show and becoming an East-Ender!" Executive producer Bryan Kirkwood said, "Both Tony and Matt are fabulous additions to the show. Headed up by David Essex, the Moon clan are on their way to becoming an established family in the Square."

=== Personality ===
Introduced as the younger half brother of Michael, Tyler was described as having a short fuse and "quick to use his fist to sort things out", and the two new brothers are said to be "a couple of likely lads who are more than likely to cause a stir in Albert Square." Discipline described Tyler as "very sparky and very charismatic! He can be quick to snap at certain people sometimes if they get on the wrong side of him, but he's a lovely guy. He's also very flirty when it comes to the women! He's a bit of a chap to say the least! It's not because he's seedy or he's horrible or anything like that—he genuinely enjoys chatting to women and chasing them. Even if they turned him down, it's all part of the chase and that's fun for Tyler. You can expect a lot of flirting, a lot of girls and maybe some arguments. We shall see!" Daniel Kilkelly from Digital Spy added that the character has much energy. Additionally, Tyler was called a "bloke's bloke" who loves to have fun with his friends, but often ends up in trouble, especially because of women. A source told Inside Soap that Tyler would quickly get to know some of the "gorgeous girls" of Walford, and the two brothers would be "heart-throbs" and "ladykillers".

Tyler's an easy-going geezer, he has a short fuse and isn't averse to throwing the odd punch where he deems it necessary. He once followed his old man into the boxing ring, but ended up in hospital, so any fights are now purely recreational. Tyler works for the family business, alongside brother Anthony, in an antiques/junk shop called The Emporium. There's nothing in the world that Tyler wouldn't do for Anthony. His relationship with his other brother, Michael, is more unsettled. Though this has more to do with Michael's inability to bond with anyone (except Janine), than Tyler.

— The BBC describes Tyler (2012)

Discipline stated that Whitney is the perfect girl for Tyler. Discipline told Inside Soap: "A lot of people say to me, 'Oh, Tyler and Whitney suit each other so much, they're meant to be together'. Then other people come up and they're like, 'Fatboy will be a lot nicer to her'. Yeah, he's a safer bet, but it's all down to what Whit wants - the safer bet or the man she's destined to be with." He continued: "I don't know how it's going to go. It could be Fatboy and Whitney who break Tyler's heart, couldn't it? In Tyler's defence, I think he understands Whitney more than anyone else. He's from a similar world to her and can comprehend the things that have gone on in her life. He cares for her."

=== Storyline development ===
Discipline has revealed that he would like to see his character engage in a serious relationship. His character, Tyler, is already seen as a ladies man. In an interview with the Inside Soap magazine, he commented: "Tyler hasn't got very far, has he? It'd be nice to see how he copes in a relationship and how he'd change from being this cheeky guy." After he was branding a soap hunk, he replied: "Oh gosh, well I get a bit of stick about it from my mates, especially when people come up to me in the street. Occasionally when you walk in somewhere, people can be like, 'Tyler Moon! Tyler Moon!', which my friends find hilarious. But I'm actually really flattered by it all." After hearing about his upcoming storyline about a boxing match he is to be injured in, he said: "I'm a massive fan of boxing. When they wrote that into the show, I was really happy."

After hearing about another upcoming storyline with colleague Shona McGarty, Discipline said to New Magazine: "It could be a lot worse! Shona's a lovely person and a great actress. And she's beautiful! There are loads of beautiful girls in EastEnders, aren't there?". He is instantly caught in a love triangle between his character Tyler, Whitney and Fatboy. For the upcoming boxing storyline, Discipline shaved all of his hair off to reflect the circumstances. Discussing his new look, the 22-year-old said: "I didn't mind, but it makes me look a lot younger. When I first had it done, I walked out of the make-up room and David Essex was p*ssing himself. He said, 'You look about ten years old, mate!'"

Discipline said he wants Tyler to get a girlfriend. He predicted that Tyler will eventually get together with Whitney. Discipline said: "I think Tyler needs to decide what he wants when it comes to women. I'd really like to see him settle down with Whitney eventually. He's harbouring some big love for her." Discipline later said that he wants Tyler to marry Whitney. He told Soaplife that the two characters have the "potential for a strong future together". He commented: "Once they finally get together and everyone's accepted it for what it is and they're left alone, I think they could go really far." Asked whether if a wedding is possible, he replied: "I hope so! Their characters would have a big East End wedding. Maybe they'd get Tyler's dad Eddie back from Spain." Viewers will see Tyler get back together with Whitney. Speaking of the plot development, Discipline added: "Lucy starts meddling and tells Tyler that Fat Boy is going to propose to Whitney on Valentine's Day. They're at R&R and Tyler feels he has to tell her not to do it, and reveals his feelings for her. [But] she tells him it's too late. He's really hurt. He knows what he feels about Whitney, and he knows he wants to be there for her, but he can't put it into the right words. This is all new to Tyler. He's never found a girl that he really wants to be with like this." McGarty said that the plot with Tyler and Whitney is "weird".

Speaking to the Sunday Mirror, McGarty commented: "We didn't plan this, but you can't help who you fall in love with. I got together with Matt last August and I love absolutely everything about him. He makes me laugh and I tell him stuff I wouldn't tell anyone else. I completely trust him. But I suppose at the moment it is a bit like the kind of plot our writers would come up with, because I'm sort of going out with two brothers. It was a bit weird at first. But we've all brought the situation upon ourselves by falling for each other and now we just laugh about it. Jacqueline doesn't mind me kissing her man and Matt doesn't mind me kissing his EastEnders brother. It's just a job and the romantic scenes are all part of it." However, McGarty said that she wanted Whitney and Fatboy to have a future. Speaking on This Morning, McGarty says she personally thinks that Whitney should stay with because he is so lovely and he genuinely cares. She commented: "For Whitney to go with Tyler now is just a risk to take. She doesn't know where it's going to go." She also added that she thinks Whitney has always loved Fatboy as a friend but she was just confused after everything that happened to her. She said: "Whitney needed a shoulder to cry on."

=== Departure ===
It was announced on 9 June 2013 that Discipline would be leaving the show. Tyler's final episode was broadcast on 6 August 2013.

== Storylines ==
Tyler arrives in Walford with his father Eddie Moon (David Essex) and his brother Anthony Moon (Matt Lapinskas), and works in his father antiques emporium. He takes up boxing, and floors his first opponent, but does not know that his other brother Michael Moon (Steve John Shepherd) paid him to let Tyler win. Tyler later dates Poppy Meadow (Rachel Bright), though she is just trying to make her boyfriend jealous. Michael manipulates Tyler into taking part in an unlicensed boxing match, and sets him up with a boxer called Artie Stiller (Maurice Lee), who is known to fight dirty. Tyler wins the fight, after taking quite a few beatings, but shortly after he collapses having a seizure in the ring. He later recovers in hospital, and when he finds out that Michael was trying to kill him, Tyler grows violent toward Michael and intimidates him for a while.

Tyler starts a relationship with Whitney Dean (Shona McGarty), but she leaves him after a few days. Tyler has a one-night stand with Whitney's best friend Lauren Branning (Jacqueline Jossa). Weeks later they kiss again and the pair begin a casual relationship, though Whitney is jealous. Whitney's boyfriend Fatboy (Ricky Norwood) notices that Tyler has lingering feelings for Whitney and warns him off. His casual relationship with Lauren continues until her grandmother Cora Cross (Ann Mitchell) tells him she needs stability, so he tells Lauren they should be friends without sex. Derek Branning (Jamie Foreman) asks Tyler and Anthony for £4000 they owe him for selling some goods for him, but they only have £3000. They agree to steal copper wire from train tracks for Derek, but Michael finds out and calls the police, leading to Derek's arrest. He is released without charge and accuses Anthony and Tyler of calling the police, increasing their debt to £8000. They realise Michael called the police and confront him and his fiancée Janine Butcher (Charlie Brooks) discovers what is going on. She pays off the debt, but Michael takes a beating from Derek.

Tyler tells Whitney he loves her and wants to be with her, she walks away, but later they kiss, causing her to refuse to go on holiday with Fatboy. Whitney then admits she likes Tyler but finds him kissing Lucy Beale (Hetti Bywater). She then tells him to leave her alone. However, Tyler makes a grand gesture with Valentine's balloons and tells her that he cannot as he loves her. Whitney admits she feels the same way and the two become a couple. Whitney believes she is pregnant and when she tells Tyler, he seems reluctant to take on a child. He comes round to the idea, but Whitney discovers she is not pregnant after all. Tyler then moves in with Whitney, but they share a house with Derek and he vows to watch Tyler closely. Tyler visits Eddie and is angry on his return to discover Anthony has left and Derek has taken control of the business. Tyler then works on the market selling Derek's stock. Whitney and Tyler end up sharing the house with several of Whitney's family, so consider getting their own home. Whitney feels guilty over a previous kiss with Joey Branning (David Witts) so tells Tyler. He fights with Joey and breaks up with Whitney. He regrets the breakup, and to prove he loves her, he proposes and she accepts. Tyler is insensitive to Whitney when she learns of the death of Tony King (Chris Coghill), an older man who groomed her into a sexual relationship with him from when she was just 12. Whitney leaves and later has sex with Joey. She tells Tyler and they both realise that they are better off apart. With Michael's help, Tyler cons Danny Pennant (Gary Lucy) into giving him his sports car, and leaves Walford to work on a cruise ship with Anthony.

== Reception ==
Inside Soap held a poll to see which of the new Moon family members, Eddie, Tyler or Anthony, its readers were most looking forward to seeing. Tyler came second with 14% of the vote. During an Inside Soap feature on the Moon brothers vs the Mitchell brothers, Kate Woodward said "Two sexy brothers to shake up Albert Square? That sounds familiar! But are Anthony and Tyler really the new Grant and Phil Mitchell?" Lapinskas commented on this, saying "It's a lot of pressure to put us both under, but what a duo to be compared to! [...] Phil and Grant were in the show together for at least 10 years, and they were fantastic—so to be linked to them is phenomenal. It really is a lot to live up to, but Tony and I are hoping to come in with our own energy and bring something completely new to EastEnders.

A columnist for All About Soap said that Tyler was "lovesick" over Whitney and he behaved like a "complete prat" in his attempts to win her back. They added that he failed miserably and predicted that in future he will think before opening his "big gob". A columnist for Soaplife said that they thought Tyler was bisexual. They noted that there had been many hints that indicated he may like men. They added that it would be fitting because Whitney never chooses the right men and predicted that Tyler would sleep with Christian Clarke (John Partridge). For his portrayal of Tyler, Discipline won Best Soap Newcomer at the 2012 TVChoice Awards.
