= Tony Discipline =

English actor (born 1989)

- Born: 8 May 1989 (age 37); Gravesend, Kent, England
- Occupations: Actor and Firefighter
- Years active: 2010–present
- Television: EastEnders
- Partner: Jacqueline Jossa (2011-2013) Shona McGarty (2026-present)
- Children: 1

Tony Discipline (born 8 May 1989) is an English actor. He is best known for playing Tyler Moon in the BBC soap opera EastEnders between 2011 and 2013.

== Early life ==
Discipline was born on 8 May 1989 in Gravesend, Kent. He became interested acting through working for a theatre lighting company while at school.

== Career ==
In November 2010, Discipline was working on Billingsgate Fish Market when he was informed by his agent of an audition for the part of Tyler Moon in the BBC soap opera EastEnders, the youngest son of already established character Eddie Moon (David Essex), brother of Anthony (Matt Lapinskas) and Michael Moon (Steve John Shepherd) and cousin of Alfie Moon (Shane Richie). Following his initial audition, he took part in a workshop two weeks later in which there were six actors shortlisted to play Tyler and six shortlisted to play Anthony. The actors were paired off, and Discipline was paired with Lapinskas. A month later, Discipline attended a screen test, and after a further screen test, he found out he had got the part. His casting was announced in May 2011 and he made his first on-screen appearance on 27 June 2011. For his portrayal of Tyler, he won the award for Best Soap Newcomer at the TV Choice Awards in 2012. In June 2013, it was announced that Discipline would be leaving the soap after two years after his character was written out. His final episode was broadcast on 6 August 2013. Discipline has since expressed interest in returning to the show.

Since his departure from EastEnders, Discipline has appeared in the short film Birds and Dogs (2016) and an episode of Murder in the Carpark (2020). In 2021, he appeared in the sci-fi film Override and The Drugs Game which was a self-biographical film of a former gangster's life in which he co-starred alongside his former EastEnders co-star Lapinksas. In 2025, he appeared in the film Dream Hacker as Harry Lucchese.

== Personal life ==
Outside of acting, Discipline works as a firefighter and is co-owner of a mobile cocktail bar. Discipline has a daughter, born in 2021.

In July 2026, Discipline and his former EastEnders co-star Shona McGarty confirmed they are in a serious romantic relationship. McGarty confirmed he's "The One" and admitted they've "always fancied each other." While supporting McGarty on the opening night of her West End performance in From the Heart, Discipline shared with The Sun his intentions to spend the rest of his life with her: "She's the love of my life, I don't want anyone else. That's my woman, my soulmate."

== Filmography ==
Year	Title	Role	Notes	Ref.
2011–2013	EastEnders	Tyler Moon	Series regular	
2011	Daybreak	Himself	Guest; 1 episode	
2011	Loose Women	Himself	Guest; 1 episode	
2011	EastEnders Revealed	Himself	Episode: "The New Moon's"	
2011	Lauren's Diaries	Tyler Moon	EastEnders spin-off	
2012	All I Want for Christmas	Tyler Moon	EastEnders spin-off	
2013	Pointless Celebrities	Himself	Contestant; 1 episode	
2013	Celebrity Juice	Himself	Guest; 1 episode	
2016	Birds and Dogs	Jimmy	Short film	
2020	Murder in the Carpark	Jimmy Cook	1 episode	
2021	Override	Steven	Film role	
2021	The Drugs Game	Ronnie	Film role	
2024	Doctors	David Marsden	Episode: "Lessons in Love"	
2025	Dream Hacker	Harry Lucchese	Film role	

== Awards and nominations ==
Year	Award	Category	Work	Result	Ref.
2011	TV Choice Awards	Best Soap Newcomer	EastEnders	Won	
