= Anthony Moon =

UK soap opera character, created 2011

- EastEnders character
- Portrayed by: Matt Lapinskas
- Duration: 2011–2012
- First appearance: Episode 4253; 25 July 2011
- Last appearance: Episode 4488; 30 August 2012
- Introduced by: Bryan Kirkwood
- Spin-off appearances: EastEnders: E20 (2011)
In-universe information
- Occupation: Antiques dealer
- Father: Eddie Moon
- Mother: Colleen Moon
- Brothers: Tyler Moon
- Sisters: Francesca Moon
- Half-brothers: Craig Moon; Michael Moon
- Nephews: Tommy Moon
- Nieces: Scarlett Butcher
- Other relatives: Alfie Moon

Anthony Moon is a fictional character from the BBC soap opera EastEnders, played by Matt Lapinskas. He was introduced on 25 July 2011, as an extension to the Moon family. The son of Eddie Moon (David Essex), half brother of Michael Moon (Steve John Shepherd) and brother of Tyler Moon (Tony Discipline), his storylines have focused on the friendship between him and Tyler, and his relationships with Poppy Meadow (Rachel Bright), Jodie Gold (Kylie Babbington), Amira Masood (Preeya Kalidas) and Alice Branning (Jasmyn Banks).

Anthony and brother Tyler were announced as new characters in May 2011, played by Lapinskas and Discipline respectively, although Tyler made his debut at an earlier date. Described as someone who "will rely on his brains and natural wit to find a more sensitive solution to any conflict", it is found out that Anthony has a gambling problem before his character arrived in Walford, which is later a focus of one of the storylines. Lapinskas said of his relationship with half-brother Michael that Anthony "idolises" him, and that Michael "corrupted" Anthony. When Eddie leaves, Anthony takes charge of his antiques business. Executive producer Bryan Kirkwood said that the Moon brothers would bring a new element to the show. Inside Soap held a poll to see which of the new Moon family members, Eddie, Tyler or Anthony, its readers were most looking forward to seeing; Anthony came third with 12 per cent of the vote. Anthony left EastEnders on 30 August 2012.

== Introduction, casting and characterisation ==
The character was announced on 10 May 2011, as an extension to the Moon family, with the part being cast to Matt Lapinskas. The character was announced at the same time as Anthony's brother Tyler, which was to be played by Tony Discipline. Lapinskas said he was over the moon over his casting and said it's good that he will be appearing on a show that he has been a lifelong fan of. He also added that the cast and crew ere very welcoming. Executive producer Bryan Kirkwood said that Lapinskas and Discipline are great additions to the show and that along with Eddie, they could become an established family on the Square. Tyler and Anthony were suspected to be "a couple of likely lads who are more than likely to cause a stir in Albert Square." Anthony first appears on 25 July 2011. Lapinskas appears as Anthony in EastEnders E20 before starting in EastEnders, saying that it "broke him in". In February 2012, Lapinskas said to Daniel Kilkelly from Digital Spy that he was "really enjoying" EastEnders and that it is "a real learning curve".

In an interview with Inside Soap, Kirkwood said that Anthony and Tyler would bring a new element to EastEnders, "There's been no shortage of brilliant and sexy women in EastEnders over the past few years and it was about time there were some blokes to join them. Tony and Matt are great actors, and the fact that they're easy on the eye is a great advantage". "What the brothers bring is romance and fun, because that's something we've been a little short-changed on in EastEnders recently. The Moons are a very interesting family to work with – they're all big characters. It's a great new era for that clan". Kirkwood added that "there is more to the pair than meets the eye" saying that there "are a couple of buried secrets between Eddie and his sons" confirming it will be "a big story for the summer". He finished, "there'll be consequences for all concerned". Kirkwood later added, "What I hope we've created in Tyler and Anthony are blokes you might see in the pub on a Friday night with an appetite for life – and for women."

"Anthony Moon's a good looking, well groomed & reliable young lad. Like many of the Moon clan, he can turn on the charm with the ladies, but deep down, he is a romantic like his father and likes to fall in love."

— The BBC on Anthony.

When Anthony was introduced, it was revealed that he was a gambling addict. Of this, Lapinskas said, "it's a great thing that our executive producer Bryan Kirkwood and the EastEnders team came up with for Anthony – that he does have this gambling problem and various insecurities connected with it. It adds some more depth to the character and it's brilliant when we can explore that. With every topic and every storyline that crops up, I think Anthony's background will always have an effect and impact on it. That's really nice to play."

Anthony is described as someone who "will rely on his brains and natural wit to find a more sensitive solution to any conflict" and "calm" by Digital Spy and the BBC. Tyler and Anthony were described as "heart-throbs" and "ladykillers", with the official EastEnders website adding that Anthony is a "well groomed & reliable young lad". Anthony and Tyler's different personalities are teased in the promotional video, which sees them recalling a prank Tyler played on his older brother before he mocks Anthony's inability to speak to "gorgeous" girls".

== Development ==
=== Notable relationships ===
==== Eddie and Michael ====
Anthony's relationship with father Eddie was not as good as Tyler's relationship with Eddie, Lapinskas told Digital Spy of this, "[Anthony] wants to show his dad that he's the man to take over the [family] business. For Anthony, his main interest is the antiques emporium – forget the girls!". Of his relationship with his half brother Michael (Steve John Shepherd), he said that Michael "corrupted" Anthony explaining, "Anthony just idolises him, the fact of the matter is that Michael has his own business and has all this money coming in, without having to worry about all the family politics, so Anthony's in awe of that".

Anthony always admired Michael and looked up to him. Michael was a businessman and very independent, and I think that's what Anthony wanted to be himself. So Anthony definitely took it to heart when he found out about the boxing match and how Michael had put Tyler in danger. But I think Anthony has always wanted to forgive Michael – it was Tyler who wanted to keep his distance. Anthony is always going to stick by Tyler, but he does have a soft spot for Michael and that's why he made the first move by approaching him for help. I think they might be able to trust Michael, because he is family. But if they do trust him, they'll always be open to being taken for granted and maybe backstabbed by him again. We'll have to wait and see what happens, because he is very devious."

— Lapinskas on Anthony's relationship with half brother Michael (Steve John Shepherd).

==== Jodie Gold and Poppy Meadow ====
Lapinskas previously had teased that Anthony would get a love interest and in November 2011, Anthony started dating Poppy Meadow (Rachel Bright). Lapinskas deemed his character "pleased that somebody likes him", and said that while he was also interested in Jodie Gold (Kylie Babbington), he was put "on the spot" by Poppy and so did what he thought was expected of him in asking her out. He and Jodie later kissed; Lapinskas revealed that Jodie would be angry with herself for betraying Poppy and decide to leave London. An Inside Soap writer predicted that Anthony had landed himself in a big mess, and that he was "playing with fire" by kissing both Poppy and Jodie. A source told RTÉ, "[Jodie] and Poppy have never let a man come between them. Poppy may have something to say to Jodie when she finds out they have kissed."

==== Amira Masood ====
In January 2012, Anthony takes an interest to Amira Masood (Preeya Kalidas), Amira states in EastEnders to Zainab Masood (Nina Wadia) that Anthony 'brightens up her life by treating her like a princess'. Speaking of his relationship with Amira, Lapinskas told Digital Spy, "From the very first time Anthony saw Amira at the pub, he said she was a goddess. Since then, he's been helping her out a bit, and she's warming to him. You never know what could happen – watch this space. It could turn into something beautiful! He added, "I think at first she might have wanted to use him to make Syed (Marc Elliott) jealous, but over a period of time, she might start warming to him. He is genuinely a nice guy and quite charming, so she could fall for him".

==== Derek Branning ====
In February 2012, Anthony and Tyler get involved with criminal Derek Branning (Jamie Foreman). Of this storyline Lapinksas said, "I loved the challenge. Every time you get a big storyline and lots of scripts, it's fantastic – there's lots to sink your teeth into. Myself, Jamie and Tony Discipline sat down and spoke about the scenes beforehand, discussing how we were going to perform them. It's like taking on a new project, so every time I get a new storyline, I'm hands-on and ready to go for it." On the scenes involving Anthony, Tyler and Derek, Lapinskas said, "I think it was definitely a shock for them to see his true colours! Anthony was really worried as he didn't want them to get into trouble, so as we saw, he was trying his best to get them out of it. But even though they were scared of Derek, Anthony and Tyler are brothers and they've got each other's backs, so it was nice that we saw them standing up to Derek in some of the scenes."

=== Departure ===
On 9 May 2012, Daniel Kilkelly of Digital Spy reported Lapinskas would be leaving EastEnders. His character departed 30 August 2012. Of his exit, Lapinskas said "I'm having a fantastic time working on EastEnders and playing the role of Anthony Moon. Working with David Essex, Tony Discipline and the EastEnders cast has been an absolute pleasure. Although I will really miss EastEnders and everyone involved, I am very excited about future projects and what is next for me as an actor." Lapinskas revealed that Anthony's exit plot sees him make a "big mistake". Anthony realises how much he loves Alice Branning (Jasmyn Banks) but is unsure how to deal with her brother and father Joey (David Witts) and Derek Branning (Jamie Foreman) respectively. Speaking to Soaplife, Lapinskas said "Joey manipulates Anthony into challenging Derek, which is a big mistake. I can't give too much away, but I can tell you that after going up against Derek, Anthony has no choice but to leave the Square." Magazine reports claim that Anthony packs his bags after losing everything to Joey and Derek, revising his gambling problem. Lapinskas hopes that Anthony will return someday. In an interview with Inside Soap, Lapinskas said that EastEnders was his first job outside of drama school and added that he has learnt a lot from the people he worked with. He also added "I was quite disappointed when I found out Anthony would be leaving, I'd have liked to do a lot more stuff with him. It's a shame to not be a part of what's coming up."

== Storylines ==
Anthony first appears when he poses as a member of the Walford council to help Eddie eject a squatter from a premises that they want to move their antiques business into. He then decides to remain in Walford and helps his father set up the business. Anthony buys some candlesticks from Cora Cross (Ann Mitchell), though she does not know their true value, but when Cora finds out their true value, she accuses Anthony of scamming her. Eddie sells the candlesticks for £8000, and when Tyler decides to take part in an unlicensed boxing match, Michael convinces Anthony that Tyler will win and that it would be a good idea to place a bet on him, knowing that Anthony suffers with a gambling addiction. Anthony steals £8000 from Eddie's safe, but bets on Tyler's opponent Artie Stiller (Maurice Lee), which leaves Michael unimpressed, as he has researched Artie and found out he is tough. During the fight, however, Tyler narrowly wins so Anthony has to confess to Eddie that he has lost the money. Shortly after he does, Tyler collapses and has a seizure, so is rushed to hospital. Eddie is sickened by Anthony's actions and tells him he wishes he was dying in a hospital bed, rather than Tyler. Distraught, Anthony storms out and attends a party run by Mandy Salter (Nicola Stapleton), culminating in him kissing her. Afterwards, Anthony returns to the hospital to learn that Tyler has been taken for a life-saving operation and is furious that Eddie was not around. Eddie then admits that his children would be better off without him. Tyler survives and recovers, but the brothers are told by Eddie that Michael set up an unfair fight to punish the family, leading Tyler and Anthony to reject Michael. Eddie then leaves Walford, leaving Tyler and Anthony the antiques business.

When Jodie Gold (Kylie Babbington) and Poppy Meadow (Rachel Bright) become homeless, Anthony asks them to move in with him and Tyler. The girls move in, and it soon emerges that Poppy is attracted to Anthony. He prefers Jodie though, but nevertheless asks Poppy out on a date. After he and Jodie talk, Anthony suddenly kisses her, but she pulls away immediately. Jodie later reveals she is moving out and later confesses that she and Anthony kissed, which greatly upsets Poppy. Jodie and Poppy reconcile and decide to move away from Walford which upsets Anthony. Anthony takes a romantic interest to Amira Masood (Preeya Kalidas) when she kisses him, however Anthony becomes frustrated when she pays more attention to her soon-to-be ex-husband Syed (Marc Elliott), who she is trying to win back. Amira later invites Anthony for a meal at her family's home, but it is awkward.

When Derek Branning (Jamie Foreman) demands £4000 for some goods he asked Anthony and Tyler to sell, Anthony says he only has £3000 as he needed to pay some bills. He agrees to sell a necklace to get some of the money, but instead, he gives it to Amira. He then gambles the rest but loses it. Derek then asks Anthony and Tyler to either pay up or steal cable from the railway, otherwise he will break their legs. Anthony goes to Michael for financial help but Michael locks Anthony in his office and calls the police, who arrest Derek and Patrick Trueman (Rudolph Walker), who offered to help the brothers. They are released without charge, but Derek then accuses Anthony and Tyler of calling the police, and increases their debt to £8000. They realise Michael called the police and confront him, and his partner Janine Butcher (Charlie Brooks) discovers what is going on. She pays off the debt, but Michael takes a beating from Derek.

Amira and Anthony's relationship continues and after having a small argument with Christian Clarke (John Partridge), Amira goes over to Anthony's house and the pair end up having sex for the first time. However, she later cries afterwards and appears to regret it. She tells him it felt wrong, but it is not his fault. She then decides to leave Walford without telling him. Anthony later learns that Amira has left after Syed tells him. When Alice Branning (Jasmyn Banks) takes a liking to Anthony, her father Derek forces Anthony to take her out. Anthony is not interested in Alice, but is scared of Derek so cannot refuse. They have a couple of dates, but they go badly. Several weeks later, Alice receives flowers and assumes they are from Anthony. Anthony is then forced to take her out again, as he does not want to upset her. However, he tries to put her off by behaving and dressing badly. Later, during a game of spin the bottle, Anthony and Alice kiss, and he then decides that he really does like her and invites her on a proper date. Alice decides she is ready to lose her virginity to Anthony, although he does not pressure her. Her brother Joey (David Witts) overhears and manipulates Anthony into playing poker with Derek. Anthony cannot resist due to his gambling addiction and ends up losing the emporium. Both Derek and Joey tell him to leave and Alice is left stood up. Joey tells her Derek drove Anthony away, so she rushes to the emporium to find Anthony, but is too late as he leaves Walford via the tube station.

== Other appearances ==
Anthony appears in the third series of the spin-off series EastEnders: E20. In episode 8, he is supervising Faith Olubunmi (Modupe Adeyeye), Ava Bourne (Sophie Colquhoun) and Donnie Lester (Samuell Benta) while they do community service in The Queen Victoria. Anthony jokes that Ava and Donnie are a couple, which leads to Donnie attempting to attack Anthony. Phil Mitchell (Steve McFadden) says it makes a change for someone to show the ladies some respect. He starts to chat Ava up but Donnie interferes once again and Anthony simply ignores him.

== Reception ==
Inside Soap held a poll to see which of the new Moon family members, Eddie, Tyler or Anthony, its readers were most looking forward to seeing. Anthony came last with 12% of the vote. During an Inside Soap feature on the Moon brothers vs the Mitchell brothers, Kate Woodward said "Two sexy brothers to shake up Albert Square? That sounds familiar! But are Anthony and Tyler really the new Grant and Phil Mitchell?" Lapinskas commented on this, saying "It's a lot of pressure to put us both under, but what a duo to be compared to!... Phil and Grant were in the show together for at least 10 years, and they were fantastic – so to be linked to them is phenomenal. It really is a lot to live up to, but Tony and I are hoping to come in with our own energy and bring something completely new to EastEnders. Rachel Tarley from the Metro said "it's nice to have a bit of fresh blood in the soap, especially since the appearance of another one of his siblings always seems to leave Michael a little more demented than he was before. Lapinskas revealed to the Daily Mirror that because of his role in EastEnders, he is recognised in public, calling the experience "surreal".
