= Michael Moon (EastEnders) =

Fictional character from EastEnders

- EastEnders character
- Portrayed by: Steve John Shepherd
- Duration: 2010–2013
- First appearance: Episode 4080; 1 October 2010
- Last appearance: Episode 4739; 1 November 2013
- Introduced by: Bryan Kirkwood
In-universe information
- Occupation: Con artist Businessman; Gym owner
- Father: Eddie Moon
- Mother: Maggie Moon
- Stepmother: Colleen Moon
- Brothers: Craig Moon
- Half-brothers: Anthony Moon; Tyler Moon
- Half-sisters: Francesca Moon
- Wife: Janine Butcher (2012–2013)
- Sons: Tommy Moon
- Daughters: Scarlett Butcher
- Other relatives: Alfie Moon

Michael Moon is a fictional character from the BBC soap opera EastEnders, played by Steve John Shepherd. The character is a second cousin once removed of Alfie Moon (Shane Richie), and first appears on 1 October 2010 after Alfie's return. He is also the father to Tommy Moon, whose mother is Alfie's wife Kat Moon (Jessie Wallace). Michael is later joined by his father Eddie Moon (David Essex) and half-brothers Tyler (Tony Discipline) and Anthony Moon (Matt Lapinskas).

A psychopath, Michael is described as a competitive and manipulative risk-taker who lives dangerously. He is a charmer with an eye for the ladies, but is willing to stab anyone in the back. He has a relationship with Roxy Mitchell (Rita Simons), which is disliked by Roxy's sister Ronnie (Samantha Womack), and later marries Janine Butcher (Charlie Brooks). In June 2012, it was announced that Shepherd decided to leave the role. Michael's last episode is on 1 November 2013, when Michael is murdered by Janine. Shepherd quit to explore new roles.

== Casting and characterisation ==
Shepherd's casting in the role of Michael was announced on 28 July 2010. Shepherd said of his casting: "I can vividly remember watching the first ever episode of EastEnders and I'm very excited to be joining such a fantastic and iconic programme. Michael Moon will be an exciting character to play". Executive producer Bryan Kirkwood explained that he had been a fan of Shepherd for many years, adding: "He's a fantastic signing for EastEnders, an exciting addition to the Moon family, and is set to cause a big splash in Albert Square from the moment he arrives." Shepherd's contract was a long-running negotiation and he received confirmation whilst filming Waking the Dead. His first appearance on screen was on 1 October 2010.

Michael is described as a competitive and manipulative risk-taker who lives dangerously, and a charmer with an eye for the ladies, but he is willing to stab anyone in the back. Shepherd said that "on the surface he's a loveable, cheeky chappy, but underneath he has hidden depths which will be exciting to explore." Shepherd opined that viewers would be unlikely to vote for him in polls such as 'sexiest male' because his character is "duplicitous": "I think viewers tend to fall in love with the character you play, and if they go for a duplicitous rogue, I'd be very surprised!" He told What's on TV that Michael can be mercenary and has a cruel streak, but "there's darkness and light to him, really. Some moments you can see him being really quite cruel and then the next he can be quite compassionate and thoughtful." He told We Love Telly that "[Michael] takes pride in the way he dresses and he's always been quite successful with the ladies." Daniel Kileklly from Digital Spy called Michael "enigmatic", and said he has a nasty side. Kirkwood compared Michael to Ronnie and Roxy's father, Archie Mitchell (Larry Lamb), saying they approach life and treat people in similar ways. The EastEnders website additionally calls Michael a "sinister", "flashy" and "jealous" man who "wouldn't think twice about screwing people over—even those he loves". It continues to read: "Michael possesses all the charming characteristics of his loveable rogue of a cousin Alfie, a cheeky-chappy with a silver tongue and an eye for the ladies, but with a more sinister and cruel streak. Michael is a serial womaniser and with a string of broken hearts and failed marriages behind him, he’s got the track record to prove it. Whenever he needs a port in a storm, there’s a girl he knows that will put him up for a night, a week or more." The London Evening Standard dubbed Moon as the "Albert Square psychopath"; Shepherd has described the character as a "functioning psychopath".

== Storyline development ==
Michael leaves Walford when he is rejected by Kat. When Alfie sees Kat kissing Michael, he feels embarrassed and shocked, but also concerned about Alfie and Kat's marriage, which Shepherd said shows a new side to Michael. After going on a date with Roxy, Shepherd said that Michael likes her no-nonsense, feisty nature and her wild side, adding that they make a good couple. Kirkwood said that "Roxy's a little girl lost and Michael could be the worst possible man for her. But how long will it take her to realise that?"

On 24 January 2011, it was announced that David Essex had joined the cast as Michael's father, Eddie, with whom Michael has a "fractured relationship". Shepherd said that Eddie's arrival will allow the reasons behind Michael's behaviour and his personality to be explored. Shepherd explained that animosity between Michael and Eddie exists because of "something dark and it's still very raw for Michael. It's made him the person he is today. It's why he is so damaged. And dangerous." He added that Eddie's return would stir up bad memories which could have a "damaging effect on Michael's relationships with the people around him". It was announced on the 10 May 2011 that Michael's half brothers were being introduced; Tony Discipline playing Tyler Moon, and Matt Lapinskas playing Anthony Moon. Kirkwood said, "The Moon clan are on their way to becoming an established family in the Square." It was revealed by Inside Soap that the rift between the two is because Michael's mother committed suicide and Michael found her body but he is convinced that Eddie killed her.

In May 2011, it was reported that Michael would develop an obsession with Ronnie Branning (Samantha Womack) and start to stalk her, with scenes including him sneaking into her bedroom to watch her sleep and going through her underwear drawer. It was also reported that Michael would spread lies about Ronnie, and ask Roxy to wear the same perfume as her sister. A source told the Daily Star, "Everyone knows Michael has a mean streak but he is set to get a whole lot worse. He's trying to meddle in as many people's lives as possible. It seems he wants Ronnie all to himself. But what exactly is he up to?" The storyline was reportedly filmed in May 2011. Speaking of Ronnie's dislike of Michael, Shepherd said "He can't work out why Ronnie doesn't like him, so he assumes she must fancy him."

Upon the reintroduction of Derek Branning, it is revealed that Michael and Derek have clashed in the past. Speaking to Inside Soap, Shepherd promised that he will continue to "oppose" Derek. He commented: "It's already been alluded to that Derek and Michael didn't get along in the past. The true extent of Derek's emotional and physical bullying of Michael still hasn't been revealed, but Michael's well aware of how unpleasant he is. Derek's a nasty piece of work." Asked whether Michael will "settle the score" with Derek, Shepherd replied: "Absolutely! Michael holds grudges and doesn't forget anything. He has a bad feeling that the Brannings will become too powerful in Walford if Derek continues to ride roughshod over everyone, so he's definitely in Michael's sights. We can expect these two to clash, that's for sure."

After Janine becomes pregnant with Michael's child, their relationship has seemed to be smoother. Shepherd revealed to Inside Soap that their relationship is set to get "rockier" in the coming weeks. He commented: "The relationship is going to get very fraught and rocky—mountainous, actually. I gather that Janine has made a habit of killing off her husbands, so Michael will have to keep one eye open where she's concerned!" Discussing Michael and Janine's connection, he continued: "They both have this 'black dog' that follows them around—it's a darkness. They share similar histories with family dysfunction, so he knows why Janine is so unpredictable and uneven. He sees himself in Janine." Shepherd also joked about how Michael and Janine's child might cope with having such twisted parents. He added: "I pity Michael and Janine's baby! How would I rate his skills as a father? Quite low. Imagine Michael changing a nappy! But he sees this as a chance to redeem himself."

Shepherd explained why his character starts to turn against his friend Jack Branning in early 2012. It was earlier reported that Michael will discover that Jack has forged Roxy's signature in order to get their daughter Amy and then shares this information with Roxy. Asked whether Michael is worried about betraying Jack, Shepherd commented: "No, as Michael doesn't like Jack's attitude towards Derek. Derek has come in and assumed the role as head of the Branning family. He's bossing everyone around and he's committing all sorts of low-level crime. Michael is galled by this. He also doesn't want the Brannings to be too powerful on the Square." Discussing his character's twisted personality, he continued: "I like his complexity and I do enjoy playing him. I feel very fortunate to be able to explore his darkness. There's a lot more territory to cover too, so I'm looking forward to that. People have taken to him as well—but one woman I met once did scream at me!" Even though Janine's pregnancy has brought Janine and Michael closer, Shepherd had revealed that it will not last.

=== Investment fraud ===
In April 2012, it was announced that Jean Slater (Gillian Wright) would form an unlikely relationship with Michael. Michael seizes this opportunity to trick Jean into giving him a large sum of money. Michael tells Jean, that because one of the suspects for the murder of Heather Trott (Cheryl Fergison) had a large sum of money, the police could easily target Jean as an additional suspect. Jean gives her scratch card winnings consisting of £8000 to Michael so he can invest it into his gym, but in fact Michael plans to use it to pay for his wedding to Janine Butcher (Charlie Brooks). Michael, seeing that Jean is an easy target, decides to con her again by asking her for a second investment by "lending" him Alfie Moon's (Shane Richie) savings. Even though Jean is initially reluctant at first, she hands over the VAT money for The Queen Victoria. Shepherd expressed his excitement for forthcoming storylines for his character Michael and Wright's character Jean. Speaking to All About Soap, Shepherd said: "We are building up to something, but I don't know what the pay-off is. It'll be a real crescendo and the thing with Jean becomes extremely intense. It's a bubbling cauldron." Shepherd later confessed that Michael doesn't care if Janine finds out where the money is coming from. He added: "He balances the risk he might be thrown out of the relationship against the benefits and decides it's worth the gamble."

Wright has said that viewers are "protective" of Jean and that Michael's scam against Jean has led to people supporting her. Wright told Inside Soap: "It's funny how protective the viewers are of Jean," she said. "The other night, I was putting the bins out and a woman screeched up in her car, wound the window down and said, 'Don't give him the money! He's a git!' I thought that was very sweet." Shepherd later said on 24 May 2012 that Michael is playing a "dangerous game" as his scam intensifies. Wright later reassured viewers that Jean will fight back against Michael and will not remain a victim. Wright commented: "This [story is] quite special, I think - it's the longest one I've ever had, but also it's taking advantage of someone with bipolar and making them feel like they are losing the plot - that's a tough story." Wright also said that the storyline is a "huge responsibility". It was later revealed in 2012 that Jean will become an unlikely Ally to Michael after she urges him not to make a terrible mistake. Wright said that she is thrilled that Jean is standing up for herself as the storyline continues. Speaking on This Morning, Wright said: "Jean is a victim and the storyline is about a victim, I suppose. [But] I didn't want it to be played as a victim. So I'm looking for any opportunity for her to seize her own power. Sometimes that might be the smallest thing, like breaking into somebody's house and searching. That's a big thing - hiding under a table is a big thing!"

=== Departure ===
In March 2013, it was announced that Shepherd had decided to leave EastEnders after three years. The actor explained that he felt it was time to move on from the show and that he had "relished every minute" of exploring Michael. He added "I feel extremely privileged to have had this amazing experience and want to thank everybody — most importantly the fans of the show — for taking Michael and his numerous flaws into their hearts." On 25 August 2013, Susan Hill from the Daily Star reported that Michael would be killed off, following "a bitter custody battle" with Janine.

== Storylines ==
Michael arrives in Albert Square to lend money to his cousin Alfie Moon (Shane Richie) for the lease of The Queen Victoria public house. Alfie's wife, Kat (Jessie Wallace), is not pleased to see him as she is carrying his baby. Kat agrees to go to Spain with him, but then decides to stay with Alfie so Michael leaves for Spain alone. He returns a few months later, wanting to see his son, Tommy, but Alfie has to break the news that Tommy died from cot death. Michael leaves and is reunited with Max Branning (Jake Wood) and Jack Branning (Scott Maslen), with whom he went to school. He stays with Jack and meets his wife, Ronnie Branning (Samantha Womack) and her sister, Roxy Mitchell (Rita Simons), who shows an interest in Michael. Kat, who is still grieving for baby Tommy, tries to get Michael to show his feelings and desperately kisses him, but he rejects her and leaves. Jack and Michael set up a boxing club. Ronnie is paranoid that because Michael is Tommy's biological father, as the baby grows up there will be similarities in their appearances, so she attempts to get rid of Michael by falsely claiming that he kissed her. Her plan fails, however, and Michael and Jack open the boxing club. Ronnie tries again to get rid of Michael by asking Phil Mitchell (Steve McFadden) for help but is unsuccessful. Michael starts dating Roxy and helps Kat and Alfie reunite when their relationship breaks down. After Ronnie reveals that she swapped her and Kat's babies and Tommy is alive, Michael shows little interest. His relationship with Roxy suffers but they soon reconcile. Michael's father, Eddie Moon (David Essex), visits Alfie, much to Michael's disgust. Michael repeatedly tells his father to leave Walford and to stay away from him. Michael calls Eddie a murderer; Eddie allegedly killed Michael's mother, and Michael rejects his half-brother Tyler Moon (Tony Discipline) when he arrives.

Michael sees Jay Mitchell (Jamie Borthwick) and Abi Branning (Lorna Fitzgerald) leaving The Queen Vic after breaking into it, but tells Kat, Alfie and Eddie that he saw Ronnie running from the scene. Everyone believes Michael and he sets Ronnie up repeatedly. Roxy refuses to believe Ronnie until she sees a text message on Ronnie's phone sent by Michael and Roxy ends the relationship. Eddie and Michael seem to make amends, but Eddie is unaware that it is part of a scheme, which includes paying a boxer to allow Tyler to believe he is a talented boxer and paying Vanessa Gold (Zöe Lucker) to break Eddie's heart. Michael also sets up an unlicensed boxing match between an ambitious Tyler and a superior boxer, Artie Stiller (Maurice Lee). Tyler wins but suffers a seizure afterwards. At the hospital, Eddie reveals Michael has a brother, Craig Moon (Elliott Rosen), who has Down's syndrome. He takes Michael to meet Craig and Eddie reveals that Craig is his full brother, who he placed in a care home. After talking with Craig, Michael accuses Eddie of rejecting him, but Eddie reveals that his mother committed suicide and that she used Michael to get back at Eddie. Michael apologises to Eddie and the two reconcile. Vanessa asks Michael for her money but he says the deal is off, so Vanessa tells Eddie about Michael's scheme. Eddie tells Tyler and Michael's other half-brother Anthony Moon (Matt Lapinskas) what Michael was doing before leaving Walford, leaving Michael rejected by his family. Michael starts a relationship with Janine Butcher (Charlie Brooks). When Max and Jack's brother, Derek Branning (Jamie Foreman) arrives in Walford, Michael is fearful of him as Derek had bullied him when they were younger. Janine later discovers she is pregnant and the couple decide to keep the baby. Michael suggests to David Wicks (Michael French) that they should team up to get Derek arrested and David agrees. Michael plants stolen goods in Derek's home but Derek catches Michael in the act, and Michael says it was David's plan. Derek uses Michael to lure David to meet him, and Derek forces David to leave Walford. When Tyler and Anthony are in debt to Derek, Anthony asks Michael for help but Michael locks Anthony in his office and calls the police on Derek. Derek threatens to kill Anthony and Tyler, and Michael suggests they leave. They soon discover he called the police and confront him. Janine hears about the trouble and pays the debt. Michael allows Derek to beat him up hoping it will help, but then discovers the debt was already paid.

Michael is surprised to find a baby scan photo and annoyed that Janine insists their child will be called Butcher, not Moon. He ends their relationship as he feels she does not trust him and she refuses to let him to be part of the child's life, insisting the child is raised by a nanny. Janine is distraught by this. Michael lures her to a "business meeting" where he proposes. She accepts on the condition that he signs a prenuptial agreement, which he does. He then cons Jean Slater (Gillian Wright) out of her lottery winnings in order to pay for the wedding so Janine cannot make all the decisions. He persuades Jean to give him more money, promising he will invest it for her. Michael then moves in with Janine.

As Jean is working for Janine, Michael worries Janine will find out where his money is coming from and tries to convince Jean to leave her job as the investment will do well. Janine grows suspicious of Michael and Jean's friendship and is angered when Jean tells her that Michael has actually confided in her about his mother's suicide. She then goes to Michael to see if she was telling the truth but he claims that Jean is lying. Jean then invests more money but Michael tries to put her off as it is for The Queen Vic's VAT bill. She soon regrets giving him the money and asks for it back but he ignores her message and claims he does not know what she is talking about. Jean is forced to tell Janine what Michael has done but Michael claims that Jean is obsessed with him and Janine's unborn baby. He attempts to turn everyone against Jean by saying she is obsessed with Roxy's daughter, Amy Mitchell (Amelie Conway), and sets up a bed containing Amy's things in Jean's bedroom. Kat believes Jean over Michael and tries to help her find proof. The day before Michael and Janine's wedding, Michael is arrested for the alleged fraud and released on bail. The truth emerges on the wedding day, when Kat tells Michael that Jean threatened to kill herself if she is sectioned because of him, leading Michael to admit to Kat that he took the money. Michael then confesses to Janine and convinces her to destroy the prenuptial agreement. They marry and Janine then suffers a placental abruption. She is taken to hospital and has the baby by emergency caesarean section. Their daughter is put on a ventilator and Michael struggles to bond with her as she fights for life; he abandons her and Janine at the hospital. However, he soon returns and assures Janine that he will stay. They name the baby Scarlett Moon and they decide to have her christened as she is in a stable condition. Even though Kat understands what he is going through, she insists he repay Jean, which he does, plus £1,000 from Janine.

Michael begins running Janine's businesses while she in hospital, and becomes a signatory on her bank accounts, which she resents. Janine's lack of trust for Michael is evident and she cannot accept that he is interested in her, not her money. She thinks his behaviour is suspicious, and eventually offers him £450,000 cash, giving him the choice of taking the money or staying, proving that he loves her. Michael does not take the money but calls Janine twisted, saying she will leave their daughter twisted too. Janine begins to doubt herself as a mother and decides to leave Michael and Scarlett. Michael struggles to cope with his daughter and the business, but later discovers Janine has shut the business down and ceased trading. Michael bonds with Scarlett and is a responsible father, hiring Alice Branning (Jasmyn Banks) as a babysitter. Alice develops an attraction to Michael, and Janine returns several months later, saying she wants sole custody of Scarlett. She manipulates Michael into giving her custody and refuses to let him see Scarlett. Alice works for Janine as Scarlett's nanny, and Michael uses Alice's attraction to manipulate her into letting him see Scarlett. Janine finds out and leaves Walford with Scarlett, so Michael angrily blames Alice but when she states that he is angry because he has no control over anything or anyone, he once again manipulates Alice by kissing her. They have sex after she reveals she is a virgin. However, the next day he coldly tells Alice that he does not love her and that their fling meant nothing, deeply hurting Alice's feelings. This leads to Alice's brother Joey (David Witts) punching Michael in The Queen Vic. Michael then has a one-night stand with Kat, who is vulnerable after Alfie tells her he wants a divorce.

Janine returns to Walford with Scarlett and she and Michael agree to be civil when Scarlett is nearly injured while they are arguing. When Janine tells Michael she wants to change Scarlett's last name to Butcher, he pins her up against the wall and puts his hands around her neck, so she has an injunction taken out, stopping him from seeing Scarlett. Michael manipulates Alice, who is Scarlett's nanny again, telling her that he loves her, and they have sex again. He persuades her to carry on as normal when they are not alone, including continuing her relationship with Tamwar Masood (Himesh Patel). He decides to kill Janine, so steals her credit card and orders sleeping tablets from the internet, planning to crush them up to put in her drink, telling Alice that they can be a family with Scarlett in Morocco. Alice decides to drug Janine's drink for Michael so he does not break his injunction, but realises that Michael has given a lethal dosage, so does not go through with it and confronts Michael, kneeing him in the groin. When she returns, she says she contemplated telling the police but instead vows to help Michael kill Janine. The next day, Michael invites Janine to meet him at The Queen Vic, so that Alice can babysit, and plant the pills. Alice goes to Janine's, and later Michael finds her at home with blood on her hands. He goes to Janine's house but finds her alive. She reveals that she and Alice have lured him into a trap where he will be framed for attempting to kill Janine. She calls the police and following several arguments, Alice arrives. Michael tries to manipulate Alice further, who tells him to run away, but when he discovers that Scarlett is locked in her room so he cannot see her, he tries to throttle Janine again. Alice stabs Michael in the back to stop him, and then she answers the door to the police. Michael and Janine both try to grab the knife, but Janine gets it first and stabs Michael again, killing him. However, Alice believes she killed him. Janine lies in her police statement, saying that Alice attacked both her and Michael, and Alice is charged with murder. Eventually, Janine is arrested, but she and Alice are both found not guilty of murder.

== Reception ==
Michael was called "creepy and a bit slimy" by a writer for website Holy Soap. In May 2011, Shepherd was nominated in the Best Soap Newcomer category at the 2011 TV Choice Awards for his portrayal of Michael. Kate White of Inside Soap praised the character, saying "Darling 'Midnight Michael'...how we love your crazy schemes, oddball ways and eccentric comments. And now you've knocked up Janine, the possibilities are endless. Lots, lots more in 2012, please!" Shepherd admitted that playing a villain has made him unpopular with viewers. He said that one woman screamed at him and a child hid behind her mother and would not speak. He commented: "It was quite upsetting, but the flip side is that they clearly believe in the drama." In February 2025, Radio Times ranked Michael as the 12th best EastEnders villain, with Laura Denby writing that "Janine met her match in the toxic but tormented Michael".
