= Jean Slater =

Fictional character from EastEnders

- EastEnders character
- Portrayed by: Gillian Wright
- Duration: 2004–present
- First appearance: Episode 2852; 16 December 2004
- Created by: Tony Jordan
- Introduced by: Louise Berridge (2004); Kate Harwood (2005); Bryan Kirkwood (2011); Dominic Treadwell-Collins (2014); Sean O'Connor (2017); John Yorke (2018)
- Spin-off appearances: EastEnders E20 (2011); Tamwar Tales – The Life of an Assistant Market Inspector (2013); The Queen Vic Quiz Night (2020)
In-universe information
- Other names: Jean Elaine Hale; Jean Walters
- Occupation: Secretary; Market trader; Barmaid; Caterer; Cleaner
- Family: Slater
- Father: Russell Hale
- Husband: Brian Slater (backstory); Ollie Walters (2015–2018)
- Sons: Sean Slater
- Daughters: Stacey Slater
- Grandsons: Arthur Fowler
- Granddaughters: Lily Slater; Hope Fowler
- Grandmothers: Rosa
- Other relatives: Charli Slater

Jean Slater (also Walters) is a fictional character from the BBC soap opera EastEnders, played by Gillian Wright. Her first appearance is in the episode first broadcast in the United Kingdom on 16 December 2004. Having only been introduced for one episode, Wright was reintroduced for four more episodes the following year and became more of a regular character in the following two years. The character is introduced as the mother of Stacey Slater (Lacey Turner) who suffers severely with bipolar disorder. Her disorder strains her relationship with her children, Stacey and Sean Slater (Robert Kazinsky). Wright researched the disorder to prepare for the role. In April 2010, it was announced that Jean would be written out of the series, however, Wright was awarded a reprieve in late 2010. Jean departed on 13 January 2011 and returned on 29 March 2011. Wright announced her intentions to leave the series in July 2013, and Jean departed on 17 September 2013. Following her departure, Wright reprised the role for 15 episodes between 2014 and 2017. In December 2017, it was announced that Jean would be reintroduced as a regular character, along with Kat Slater (Jessie Wallace) and Mo Harris (Laila Morse). She returned on 20 March 2018. On 11 December 2023, Wright appeared in her 1,000th episode as Jean.

Jean's storylines include supporting Stacey with her bipolar disorder, relapsing and attempting suicide after Stacey flees Walford due to being framed for attempted murder by Janine Butcher (Charlie Brooks), a feud with Pat Butcher (Pam St Clement), an unlikely friendship with Michael Moon (Steve John Shepherd) in which he begins conning Jean in a storyline tackling investment fraud, revealing to Stacey that her deceased husband Brian had been bigamous, being diagnosed with ovarian cancer, suffering another bipolar episode after her medication becomes ineffective, being scammed out of her pension, and a feud with Zoe Slater (Michelle Ryan) after blaming her for causing Stacey's departure in 2025. Other storylines include a failed marriage to Ollie Walters (Tony O'Callaghan), and relationships with Billy Mitchell (Perry Fenwick), Ian Beale (Adam Woodyatt), Daniel Cook (Adrian Edmondson), and Harvey Monroe (Ross Boatman).

== Creation and development ==
=== Casting ===
"I don't think she was ever intended to be a regular. She snuck in the back door really! She's a character that's grown after being created for a week of episodes back in 2005 for that big storyline where Stacey found Jean in the flat that was all boarded up. There was the odd little bit here and there over the following months and it just gradually built up to becoming a regular. It was quite hard to turn her from someone who was quite an intensive character to someone who could be watched on a regular basis."

— Wright on how Jean became a regular character (2009)

Jean was originally a guest-character, appearing for a storyline where her daughter Stacey Slater, played by Lacey Turner, struggles to look after her in December 2005. The character eventually became a regular, but Wright said she did not believe this was originally intended: "She's a character that's grown after being created for a week of episodes back in 2005 for that big storyline where Stacey found Jean in the flat that was all boarded up. There was the odd little bit here and there over the following months and it just gradually built up to becoming a regular. It was quite hard to turn her from someone who was quite an intensive character to someone who could be watched on a regular basis."

=== Bipolar disorder ===
In Jean's original storyline and initial episodes, which show a much grittier persona, Stacey returns to live with her mother, who has bipolar disorder, amidst one of her mental breakdowns. Scenes showed a very ill Jean, "as she sank into the dark despair of her illness", living in squalor, off her medication, starved, petrified, drinking heavily, suicidal, and being abused and ridiculed by her neighbours". Stacey is forced to admit her to a psychiatric hospital for her own safety. For the storyline, Wright contacted a bipolar sufferer who she continued to remain in contact with when researching the condition. Wright received an immensely positive reception from her character's bipolar storyline, with viewers of the serial approaching her with their stories relating to Jean's. She told Louisa Baldwin of Eastern Daily Press that a woman approached her on the tube and informed her that after watching Jean's storyline, she realised her son has bipolar disorder. The actress commented, "I was touched and realised the huge responsibility I had playing the character".

In May 2009, Stacey started showing signs of bipolar disorder. Series consultant Simon Ashdown said the storyline tests Jean, adding, "you'll see her attempt to adopt more of a maternal role towards Stacey. Up till now it's Stacey who has been the 'carer' in the relationship." In an interview with entertainment website Digital Spy, Wright discussed Jean's complex character, saying "She's slightly quirky and off-kilter but also has bipolar, if that makes sense? The disorder's different for everybody. I wait until the scripts come in and sometimes I think 'we've been on a flat level for too long' so I find a way within the dialogue to make it a bit different." The actress also revealed that she greatly enjoys working on EastEnders as it is always full of surprises.

=== Departure and return (2011) ===
On 29 April 2010, it was announced that Jean and Stacey were both to depart from the soap later in the year. Wright said of her departure: "It's been an honour to play Jean especially as the public response to her has always been so supportive. It's been a real privilege to be able to heighten awareness of bipolar disorder. I've thoroughly enjoyed working with my onscreen Slater family, in particular working with Lacey and developing such a great rapport over the years." Executive producer Bryan Kirkwood added: "Gillian has brought real heart and pathos to the role of Jean Slater, a complex and fragile character who has really been taken into the public's affection." In May 2010, Wright told Kris Green of Digital Spy that working with EastEnders is a privilege. She said of her departure: "Things can't last forever. I am an actress and it's all a big adventure, isn't it? It's wonderful to have been in it for so long. [Jean] wasn't meant to be a regular character, so to have crept in slowly, then become a regular...for the audience to love and for me to be able to play something a little quirky, fun and also bipolar has been a privilege." However, Wright was given a reprieve in late 2010, when it was announced that a storyline had been created for Jean and Wright had signed a new contract to return in 2011. Jean left EastEnders on 13 January 2011 and returned on 29 March 2011.

=== Investment fraud ===
In April 2012, it was announced that Jean would form an unlikely relationship with Michael Moon (Steve John Shepherd). Michael seizes this opportunity to trick Jean into giving him a large sum of money. Michael tells Jean, that because one of the suspects for the murder of Heather Trott (Cheryl Fergison) had a large sum of money, the police could easily target Jean as an additional suspect. Jean gives her scratch card winnings consisting of £8000 to Michael so he can invest it into his gym, but in fact Michael plans to use it to pay for his wedding to Janine Butcher (Charlie Brooks). Michael, seeing that Jean is an easy target, decides to con her again by asking her for a second investment by "lending" him Alfie Moon's (Shane Richie) savings. Even though Jean is initially reluctant at first, she hands over the VAT money from The Queen Victoria. Shepherd expressed his excitement for forthcoming storylines for his character Michael and Wright's character Jean. Speaking to All About Soap, Shepherd said: "We are building up to something, but I don't know what the pay-off is. It'll be a real crescendo and the thing with Jean becomes extremely intense. It's a bubbling cauldron." Shepherd later confessed that Michael doesn't care if Janine finds out where the money is coming from. He added: "He balances the risk he might be thrown out of the relationship against the benefits and decides it's worth the gamble."

Wright has said that viewers are "protective" of Jean and that Michael's scam against Jean has led to people supporting her. Wright told Inside Soap: "It's funny how protective the viewers are of Jean," she said. "The other night, I was putting the bins out and a woman screeched up in her car, wound the window down and said, 'Don't give him the money! He's a git!' I thought that was very sweet." Shepherd later said on 24 May 2012 that Michael is playing a "dangerous game" as his scam intensifies. Wright later reassured viewers that Jean will fight back against Michael and will not remain a victim. Wright commented: "This [story is] quite special, I think – it's the longest one I've ever had, but also it's taking advantage of someone with bipolar and making them feel like they are losing the plot – that's a tough story." Wright also said that the storyline is a "huge responsibility". It was later revealed in 2012 that Jean will become an unlikely Ally to Michael after she urges him not to make a terrible mistake. Wright said that she is thrilled that Jean is standing up for herself as the storyline continues. Speaking on This Morning, Wright said: "Jean is a victim and the storyline is about a victim, I suppose. [But] I didn't want it to be played as a victim. So I'm looking for any opportunity for her to seize her own power. Sometimes that might be the smallest thing, like breaking into somebody's house and searching. That's a big thing – hiding under a table is a big thing!"

=== 2013 departure ===
Former The Bill star Tony O'Callaghan was cast in 2013 as Ollie Walters, a new love interest for Jean. It was reported that they would meet after Jean is given an allotment, where they initially clash. Wright opted to leave EastEnders in 2013 after eight years with the serial and Jean's departure was announced in July 2013, with her exit scheduled for October 2013. The actress decided to leave so she could explore other acting roles, although hoped the character could return in the future. Wright called the opportunity a "huge privilege" and said she will miss the serial "enormously". Following weeks of being in an on-off relationship, Ollie tells Jean that he is moving to Brighton, leaving Jean saddened. Ollie confesses his love to Jean on the day of his move and she makes a "huge decision" by moving to Brighton with him. The characters departed on 17 September 2013. Jean and Ollie drove away from the show's fictional setting of Albert Square in a convertible sports car, although originally, writers planned for them to leave in a Ford Fiesta, which Wright found "utterly boring". She hoped for an "imaginative" exit so they changed the vehicle to the convertible sports car. The show's health and safety officers informed Wright that she would have to remain seated for the scene, but she did not agree with that and chose to stand regardless.

=== Guest returns ===
In December 2013, it was announced that Turner had chosen to return to EastEnders as Stacey and would be filming her return scenes in January 2014. Stacey returned for six weeks between 7 February and 25 March 2014, before being arrested for the murder of Archie Mitchell (Larry Lamb). On 18 May 2014, it was confirmed that Wright had chosen to return to the soap for a short stint, where she would be reunited with Stacey, who would be making a permanent return that summer. Speaking on her upcoming return, Wright said: "I feel very honoured to be asked to reprise my role as Jean Slater for a short while. The storyline promises to be challenging and exciting! I look forward to playing again with old friends and new, and to pick up the special relationship between Stacey and Jean." Executive producer, Dominic Treadwell-Collins also commented: "We are so pleased to have Gillian back with us to reprise her role as Jean Slater, albeit briefly. Stacey and Jean have such a rich, loving but difficult history. There is still so much to plumb between them as we delve deeper into what it means to have bipolar disorder as a mother but also as a daughter. There are some truly heartbreaking scenes ahead for our audience." In June, Wright and Turner returned to filming, with pictures of the filming being released on 27 June. The pictures revealed that Jean would end up in hospital, with Stacey visiting her. It was also promised that Jean and Stacey's bipolar would be revisited, with Treadwell-Collins commenting: "Stacey and Jean have such a rich, loving but difficult history. There is still so much to plumb between them as we delve deeper into what it means to have bipolar disorder as a mother but also as a daughter. There are some truly heartbreaking scenes ahead for our audience."

The following month it was revealed that Jean's return storyline would see her plot to get Stacey out of prison. Spoiler pictures were released on 27 July showing Jean and Kat visit Stacey in prison. Days later, more spoiler pictures were released and it was revealed that Jean would end up in hospital after collapsing, with Stacey visiting her from prison. Wright's return scenes aired on 4 August 2014 and she departed on 11 August, one week later.

On 26 May 2015, it was announced that Wright would be returning to EastEnders for a second guest stint since her 2013 exit. It was thought that Jean would be returning for her wedding to Ollie, after paparazzi caught Wright wearing a 'Bride-to-be' top. O'Callaghan and Turner were also spotted on-location, filming in wedding attire. It was also considered that Jean's return may link with an ongoing storyline for Stacey with a key she has, given to her by Sean. Wright's return scenes aired on 3, 6 and 7 July 2015, with the main focus on Stacey's key as Jean disagreed with Stacey having it. Wright filmed further scenes as Jean in October 2015, with Jean making onscreen appearances on 3, 17 and 18 December 2015. Jean's return saw the truth behind Stacey's key being uncovered as Jean revealed that her deceased husband, Brian, had a second family and the man, Kyle (Riley Carter Millington), who had been following Stacey for months, had been contacting Jean. The BBC announced that Wright would return in late January 2016, appearing in episodes on 19 and 21 January. Jean returned for one episode in April 2016. Despite it being Stacey's wedding in May 2016, she did not appear, which Laura-Jayne Tyler of Inside Soap said she "couldn't believe" as Jean would normally "turn out for the opening of a gas bill." Wright said she enjoyed her frequent guest appearances, calling herself "lucky" for having that opportunity. She also revealed that she hopes her character will not be killed off and instead, will continue making appearances in the soap.

=== Reintroduction (2018) ===
On 20 December 2017, it was announced that Wright would reprise the role in early 2018. Jean's reintroduction was announced alongside that of Kat (Wallace) and Mo (Morse). Jean returns with Kat and Mo to help Stacey following a "nightmare Christmas run-in" with Max Branning (Jake Wood). Wright expressed her delight at the Slater family being reintroduced and said she enjoyed working with Turner, Wallace and Morse. Yorke, who returned as the show's executive consultant in 2017, called the Slater family "one of the all-time great families in EastEnders" and opined that the show is very different without them. On their reintroduction, Yorke commented, "It has been a real joy to find a way to bring them back together and we're incredibly excited about where we are taking them next." Yorke also revealed that new Slater family members would be introduced too.

=== Ovarian cancer ===
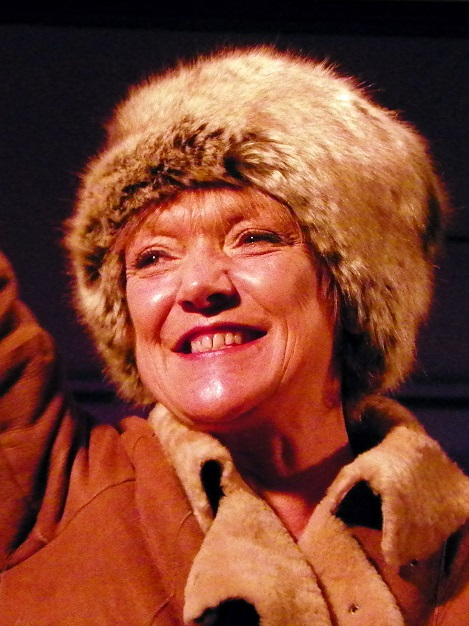
Gillian Wright (pictured) felt honoured to be portraying Jean's ovarian cancer storyline.

In December 2018, new EastEnders executive producer Kate Oates outlined some of her upcoming storylines for the show, including her desire to put Jean at the forefront of an emotional storyline, which would "look at her mental health through the lens of her physical health". In January 2019, it was announced that Jean would be diagnosed with ovarian cancer, and following the announcement that Sean would be returning to the serial, the connection was made that he would be returning for her illness storyline. Following further details of the story, Oates stated, "Jean's diagnosis will impact every aspect of her life, including her family, her friendship groups and her mental health, and I know an actor of Gillian's calibre will approach the story with great truth and depth. The Slaters are an amazing ensemble family, full of complex and well-drawn characters, and this story is a completely fresh subject for them to tackle. I know they'll do it justice and in turn raise awareness of such an important issue that affects so many people." On being given the plot to tackle, Wright expressed, "It's an honour and a huge responsibility to be taking on such an enormous issue, affecting so many women and their families. I'm aware of the impact such stories can have. It's important we treat the issue of cancer diagnosis and treatment with huge sensitivity, dignity and respect. I hope the storyline helps awareness of the disease and is supportive to those that are affected."

== Storylines ==
Jean suffers with bipolar disorder and her condition steadily deteriorates. Despite her daughter Stacey Slater's (Lacey Turner) help, Jean attempts suicide and is sectioned. Over the following years, she attempts to rebuild her relationship with Stacey and her son, Sean Slater (Robert Kazinsky), following his return from the army. She makes progress with Stacey, but Sean continues to reject her. Jean moves in with the Slater family in Walford and meets Ted (Richard Hope) at a singles' night. They date; however, Ted ends it because he cannot handle Jean's personality. Jean takes the rejection badly, has a breakdown and is admitted to a psychiatric ward for several months. When Stacey begins showing symptoms of bipolar, Jean intervenes and Stacey is sectioned. During her stay in hospital, Stacey grows close to another patient, Becca Swanson (Simone James); upon Stacey's release, Becca returns to live with her. Becca vies for Stacey's attention. She grows jealous of Stacey's husband Bradley Branning (Charlie Clements) and Jean. Following Bradley's death and the birth of Stacey's baby daughter Lily Branning (Alfie Duncan), Becca successfully attempts to exclude Jean from Stacey's life. It is not until the true extent of Becca's involvement in Bradley's death is revealed (Becca had called the police and implicated him for Archie Mitchell's (Larry Lamb) murder (see Who Killed Archie?) and Bradley died in the subsequent police chase by jumping off the roof of the Queen Vic that Stacey finally sees sense and begins to trust Jean again.

While at R&R nightclub, Jean is saved by Billy Mitchell (Perry Fenwick) from a man who pesters her. Jean invites Billy back to her house and they have sex, but Billy hurts her feelings the next day when she hears him making insulting comments about her. Despite being upset, she accepts Billy's apology, dismissing it as just a one-night stand. Following Stacey's confession that it was she, not Bradley, who murdered Archie a year before, Jean begins to doubt Stacey is fit to care for Lily. Her fears worsen when Janine Malloy (Charlie Brooks) stabs herself and makes it look like Stacey is responsible. Jean phones the police asking them to detain Stacey. Fearing prison, Stacey attempts to flee and is eventually helped to escape by Jean once Stacey reveals her motive behind Archie's murder — he had raped her. Stacey takes Lily and leaves. Jean is heartbroken by her departure; she grows depressed and Stacey's relative Kat Moon (Jessie Wallace) finds her in the bath fully clothed attempting to drown herself. Realising that she is not coping, Jean admits herself into a psychiatric hospital.

Kat visits Jean three months later and Jean reveals she is better and can leave. Kat invites her to stay with her, which she does. She works for Kat and her husband Alfie Moon (Shane Richie) as barmaid and cook at The Queen Victoria public house. She develops crushes on Alfie's cousin Eddie Moon (David Essex) and Janine's uncle Norman Simmonds (George Layton), but her interest is not returned by either. Jean is thrilled when she wins £8000 on a lottery scratchcard. She makes an incorrect assumption that a man named Carter (Andrew Scarborough) is attracted to her, but he is later revealed to be a benefit fraud officer who declares Jean has been illegally claiming benefits whilst working at the pub. Kat's grandmother Mo Harris (Laila Morse) later admits that she has been claiming benefits in Jean's name. Jean begrudgingly agrees to take the blame as Mo has a previous conviction, but the stress causes another mental breakdown; she obsesses over Shenice Quinn (Lily Harvey), a young girl who the Moons care for, believing she is an angel. Instead of having her readmitted to hospital, Kat vows to care for Jean at home, and Jean eventually improves.

As Alfie has hired Ray Dixon (Charles Venn) as a professional chef, Jean is fired from the pub kitchen, but is given the job of events manager. Jean is conned out of her lottery winnings by Michael Moon (Steve John Shepherd), who tells her he will invest the money for her. He persuades her to "invest" Alfie's money, which Jean has been given to pay bills with and she also invests money saved for The Queen Vic's VAT bill. Barmaid Roxy Mitchell (Rita Simons) discovers the money missing, so a worried Jean asks Michael to return it, but he denies any knowledge of her investment. Jean tells Michael's fiancée, Janine, that he has taken her money, but Michael claims Jean is obsessed, thinking he is her son, Sean, therefore making Janine's unborn baby her grandchild. Roxy believes Jean, but Michael convinces her that Jean is also obsessed with Roxy's young daughter Amy Mitchell (Amelie Conway), and plants Amy's belongings in Jean's bedroom to prove it. Nobody believes Jean, and she becomes desperate to clear her name. Eventually, Roxy warns her to stop making allegations. Realising that she cannot cope with Jean alone, Roxy calls Alfie. Alfie returns with Kat, and Kat believes Jean, vowing to help prove Michael took the money. The truth eventually emerges when Kat tells Michael that Jean threatened to kill herself if she is sectioned over him, leading to Michael admitting to Kat that he took the money. When all these events cause Janine to go into premature labour on her wedding day to Michael, Jean has a sudden change of heart and strongly advises Michael to support Janine after he decides to flee. Kat then tells Michael that he must repay the money to Jean, which he does.

Jean forms an unlikely friendship with Shirley Carter (Linda Henry) and supports Ian Beale (Adam Woodyatt) following his nervous breakdown. When he recovers and decides to open up a new restaurant he appoints Jean as his sous-chef. However the stress of holding down two jobs, coupled with Ian's constant bullying, results in Jean quitting, especially when she falsely accuses Ian of sexually harassing her. Drowning her sorrows with Shirley and Bianca Butcher (Patsy Palmer), Jean realises that she has left her handbag at the restaurant and they break in at night to retrieve it. Shirley and Bianca continue to get drunk and a fire soon breaks out; the sprinkler system puts it out but floods the restaurant. The women escape unseen, but Jean struggles with her guilt. She confesses to Kat, who convinces her to keep quiet but when Jean volunteers to help clean up the restaurant with Ian she confesses to him. Ian threatens to call the police, but he later decides against it. Jean takes up an allotment, where she meets Ollie Walters (Tony O'Callaghan). Ollie asks Jean on a date but she is reluctant upon finding out he is a retired police officer, but Kat and Alfie convince her to go. She confesses about her recent crimes to Ollie on their second date, but he tells her it does not matter as she was not charged so she can forget about it. Their date goes well and afterwards Jean invites Ollie to spend the night with her. Eventually, Jean tells Ollie about her bipolar disorder, despite worrying that he would reject her. He researches the illness but Jean realises that he does not really want to be with someone who has a mental illness, so they break up. She tries to reunite with him later but discovers he is retiring to Brighton. She attends his retirement party but leaves before he sees her. Ollie comes to visit Jean asking if she would move to Brighton with him, but Kat tells Jean not to go as she is needed in Walford. However Kat later regrets this and tells Jean she should go. Jean then leaves Walford with Ollie to start a new life in Brighton after saying an emotional farewell to Kat and Alfie.

When Stacey returns to Walford, she publicly confesses to killing Archie, which leads to her clearing Bradley's name and being imprisoned with a five-year sentence, and Lily is temporarily left in Jean and Ollie's care. A few months later, Jean arrives at Kat and Alfie's home with Lily. She visits Stacey in prison, urging her to appeal her sentence, but Stacey refuses. Jean struggles to cope with looking after Lily, and when she overhears Alfie and Kat talking about her, she attempts suicide. Stacey is allowed to visit Jean in hospital, where Stacey realises how much her family need her, especially as Jean wants to stay in a psychiatric hospital. Jean eventually convinces Stacey to appeal her sentence and then returns to a psychiatric hospital in Brighton.

Jean returns to Walford and surprises Stacey and Lily by revealing that she and Ollie are getting married. She runs away after spotting a key that Stacey is wearing, who reveals Sean gave it to her, and that it is connected with her deceased husband, Brian. Stacey, Shirley, Lily and Stacey's new boyfriend Martin Fowler (James Bye) all travel from Walford to Brighton to attend the wedding. She and Ollie then marry with their friends and family around them. Jean is furious when she returns home and finds Stacey looking through her belongings, trying to find out what the key is for. She accuses Stacey of being unwell, but then snatches the key from Stacey and appears to flush it down the toilet. Stacey leaves in anger, taking Martin, Lily and Shirley with her. It is then revealed that Jean still has the key.

Jean later visits Stacey and steals an unopened letter after recognising the handwriting, and when Jean and Ollie visit again, Stacey tells Jean she is being followed. Ollie reveals someone visited Jean and when Stacey asks Jean who he is, Jean takes the key from her bag, saying it was Stacey's father's. Jean tells Stacey is it for Brian's safety deposit box, Stacey finds it is empty, so Jean tells Stacey that her father, Brian, had another family, and Stacey realises the man following her must her half brother. In January 2016, Jean and Ollie return to Walford to meet Stacey's newborn son Arthur Fowler. Stacey allows Jean to hold him, but when Jean hands him to Martin, Stacey snatches him out of Martin's hands and flees, claiming that she is seeing the devil. Jean berates Martin for not handling Stacey's bipolar properly and wants to call for professional help, but Martin convinces her to let him find Stacey and convince her himself. Eventually, Martin finds Stacey and convinces her that a hospital is the safest place for her and Arthur, so Jean and Ollie decide to stay in a hotel nearby just in case Stacey needs them. Jean later visits Stacey at the hospital and later contacts Martin and informs him that she has returned to Brighton. In April 2017, Jean arrives to visit her family and meets Martin's sister, Michelle Fowler (Jenna Russell). Martin tells her about Michelle's affair with her student, Preston Cooper (Martin Anzor), who was also in a relationship with his daughter, Bex Fowler (Jasmine Armfield). Later that year, Stacey leaves Walford with her children to stay with Jean, after admitting to cheating on Martin with Max Branning (Jake Wood).

Mo returns to Walford and the news Kat has died spreads. Whilst arranging her funeral and fundraising for it, Jean arrives when a concerned Martin contacts her and she tells Stacey that Kat could not be dead as she spoke to her on the phone earlier in the day, but when Stacey checks Jean's call history, there are no calls from Kat. Stacey puts it down to her not taking her bipolar medication. Kat returns to the house after Jean sees her from the upstairs window and upon learning the truth of what has been going on, she is annoyed with Mo, but is forced to hide in a cupboard when Ian visits with the raised money. Annie Pritchard (Martha Howe-Douglas), the daughter of Terry, who is the man that Mo conned money out of, arrives to get the money back, but the family fool her into believing Mo has died. Annie finds out that the family have not suffered a bereavement and one of her henchmen turns up on the doorstep and tells Mo that Annie wants £5,000 by Friday. Jean pays off the debt using her life savings, and the family decide to stay in Walford until Jean is repaid. When the family are offered money for the sale of Charlie's old cab, Jean is given the deciding vote but chooses not to sell it so Kat wonders why Jean is avoiding returning home. Jean admits that Ollie has hurt her. Kat invites Ollie to Walford but he denies hitting her. Jean says that Ollie kissed a woman, Elsie, which is why she left, but she still loves Ollie and wants to go home with him, however, Ollie accidentally calls her by Elsie's name so she realises he has been having an affair. Ollie leaves and Jean decides to stay after returning her wedding ring. She later applies for a divorce. Jean then helps Stacey's cousin Hayley Slater (Katie Jarvis), during her pregnancy and soon finds out that Alfie is the father, then prevents Hayley from committing suicide.

Jean grows close to Ian when they attend the same choir, and eventually they kiss when Jean is drunk. At Christmas, Jean thinks Ian has bought her an engagement ring and she says "I do" but he has given her earrings that belonged to his ex-wife. The truth about the paternity of Hayley's baby, Cherry Slater, is revealed and eventually, Hayley is hospitalised for mental health issues so the Slaters, including Jean, all care for Cherry. Ian and Jean meet for lunch but she leaves when he says she is probably menopausal. Jean later says that whatever they had is not working, so he says it is fine as she is not her type so she throws wine on him. Later, Jean feels bloated and wonders if Ian was right about the menopause. Jean sees a doctor who wants to refer her for further tests so Jean says she is making it sound like ovarian cancer, then realises that is what the doctor is actually thinking. Jean then calls Ian a selfish man after he tries to apologise for how he treated her. Stacey worries about Jean's behaviour so makes her go back to the doctor but Jean sneaks out. Kat finds a letter from the hospital so Jean makes Kat promise not to tell anyone, however, Kat tells Stacey and makes an appointment at a private clinic. After overhearing Kat and Stacey discuss cancer, Jean leaves Walford, staying in a caravan in Wales under the pseudonym, "Petronella Mills". Stacey eventually finds Jean and with the help of Lily, eventually convinces her to come home.

Upon her return to Walford, Jean wants Stacey to help her contact Sean. Though Stacey claims she does not know Sean's contact details or whereabouts, Kat finds out that Stacey had contacted Sean weeks earlier and told him about Jean's cancer. Stacey claims that Sean acted strangely and talked morbidly about Jean dying during the phone call. After much hesitation, Stacey gives Sean's number to Jean, who leaves a voicemail message. Several days later, Sean and Jean reunite at The Queen Vic where he takes Jean to her chemotherapy appointment. After Sean scares Jean by asking morbid questions, Stacey takes him aside and rebukes him for his actions, wishing he would be a normal person. Though Sean admits he cares about their family, Stacey tells him he is a damaged person and should leave Walford for Jean's sake. When Jean is adamant that she will not let him walk out on her again, Sean suggests that they run away together. They take a trip to the countryside, where he helps her shave her head bald. While they are out on a walk, Jean injures her leg when falling on a sharp metal wire. Jean hides her injury from Sean but he later finds out, calls for an ambulance and tries to stop her from bleeding. When Jean tells Sean that she thinks she is going to die, Sean confesses that he killed his father, Brian. As he goes into detail about his crime she begins to drift out of consciousness. When Sean leaves the room, a dazed Jean asks for Sean and tells him that she loves him. Sean retreats to the barn, intending to commit suicide by shooting himself. Recovering from the injury, Jean tells Stacey what Sean did and they both find him at the barn. Jean reassures Sean that he is not a bad person for his actions, and that Brian had been living a double life with another family the entire time. Sean agrees to let go of the gun and collapses in tears as Jean comforts him. After spending the weekend at the Slater house and quickly becoming overwhelmed, he asks to be left alone for time to gather his thoughts. Jean finds a nearby flat for Sean to live in, but when she comes home to tell him, she finds him having packed his bags to leave Walford. He reveals he has booked an appointment at a mental health facility to get the help he needs. He says an emotional goodbye to Jean and gives her a ringtone for when he will call her.

While at a doctor's appointment, Jean and Stacey see Daniel Cook (Adrian Edmondson) being difficult with the nurses. He later approaches Jean and attempts to initiate a conversation, but accidentally makes an offensive comment which causes Jean to throw a glass of water over him. Stacey later confronts him about making Jean angry. Daniel continues to be seen each time Jean makes a visit to the hospital and they start to grow close. In September 2019, Daniel reveals that his cancer has returned and is now terminal, and Jean promises to care for him. As her feelings for Daniel begin to blossom, and she gets excited about introducing him to Stacey, Jean receives a call from Daniel's neighbour saying that Daniel has died, having been discovered at his home. Jean attends his memorial alongside Kush Kazemi (Davood Ghadami), but it is revealed that Daniel faked his own death because he felt that he was getting too emotionally involved with Jean and did not want to put her through the pain of watching him die slowly.

Two months later, while Jean watches videos of Daniel and gets emotional, Kush visits the hospital to give some magazines on Jean's behalf and bumps into Daniel. He persuades him to come back to Walford and tell Jean the truth but he refuses. On Christmas Day, after the Panesars almost evict the Slaters from their home while demanding back rent, Daniel re-introduces himself to Jean, who is furious at him for faking his death until her family tells her that someone paid the back rent in full, making her realise that Daniel paid the rent for her. She asks him for an explanation as to why he faked his death; he admits that it is because he was falling in love with her and knowing she was falling for him as well, he did not want her to go through the pain of saying goodbye to him on his deathbed. Touched, she kisses him passionately and assures him she will help him live out the rest of his time as fulfilling as possible. As his condition worsens, Daniel promises her that he will hold on to his life until he knows Jean is free of cancer. When she learns that the cancer has gone, she initially lies, saying the consultant mixed up her results and she has to wait a few days, but Mo then reveals the truth about the outcome. As the pair sit on a bench together, Daniel sends Jean to get hot chocolates; when she returns, Daniel has died.

Following Daniel's death, Jean begins a relationship with Harvey Monroe (Ross Boatman). Jean suffers a bipolar relapse and on her wedding day flees to Southend, where she attempts suicide, confusing Harvey with Daniel in her distressed state. Stacey saves her and Jean is subsequently sectioned.

== Reception ==
The episodes showing Stacey struggling to look after Jean were described as a "harrowing and bleak", were praised by critics in the media. Wright and Turner were complimented for giving "graphically powerful performances", and the storyline won a Mental Health Media Award in September 2006. The actress expressed her delight at being awarded with the accolade, stating she is "chuffed". Wright also won 'Best Actress' at the 2012 Inside Soap Awards Kate White of Inside Soap praised the friendship between Jean and Shirley Carter (Linda Henry) writing: "We love, love, love the genius pairing of Jean and Shirley. With Heather Trott, played by Cheryl Fergison having been brown bread [dead] for over a year, it's time Shirley got a new BFF – and we reckon zany Jean is perfect."

In June 2019, Wright received the Best Female Dramatic Performance accolade at 2019 British Soap Awards for her portrayal of Jean throughout her ovarian cancer storyline. In July 2019, Wright was nominated for the Best Actress accolade at the Inside Soap Awards.

In 2020, Sara Wallis and Ian Hyland from The Daily Mirror placed Jean 74th on their ranked list of the best EastEnders characters of all time, commenting that the character has "had a lot going on" and that she is most "famous" for her "sausage surprise".
