= Forgive and Forget (2000 film) =

- Directed by: Aisling Walsh
- Written by: Mark Burt
- Produced by: Simon Passmore
- Starring: John Simm; Steve John Shepherd; Laura Fraser; Maurice Roëves
- Cinematography: Kevin Rowley
- Edited by: Chris Bucland
- Music by: Hal Lindes
- Production company: Scottish Television Enterprises
- Release date: 3 January 2000
- Running time: 100 minutes
- Country: United Kingdom
- Language: English

Forgive and Forget is a 2000 British made-for-television film in which a young latent gay man confronts his sexuality and increasing jealousy when his best friend moves in with his new girlfriend. The film was broadcast on ITV on 3 January 2000.

== Plot ==
The close friendship between plasterer David (Steve John Shepherd) and mature-aged student Theo (John Simm) becomes threatened when Theo reveals that he intends to move in with Hannah (Laura Fraser), his photographer girlfriend of six months. The short-tempered David, intensely protective of his best friend, plots to break the pair up, using Hannah's insecurities against them. When they do separate, David reveals his sexual orientation and true feelings for Theo on his favourite talk-show, Judith Adams' (Meera Syal) Forgive and Forget.

== Cast ==
- John Simm as Theo
- Steve John Shepherd as David O'Neil
- Laura Fraser as Hannah
- Maurice Roëves as Michael O'Neil
- Ger Ryan as Ruth O'Neil
- Meera Syal as Judith Adams
- Stephen Graham as John
- Roger Griffiths as Carlton
- Huggy Leaver as Paul
- Charles De’Ath (credited as Charlie De'Ath) as Alex
- Isabella Marsh as Gabby
- Jonathan Slinger as Carl
- Nikki Amuka-Bird as Nicky
- Annette Bentley as Michelle
- June Page as Carol
- Paul Panting as Gerry
- Jenny Paterson as Caroline
- Jack Pierce as John
- Sam Rumbelow as 1st Man in Bar
- Ash Logan as 2nd Man in Bar
- Nicola Sanderson as Jackie
- Cameron Williams as Gary
- Thomas Jamerson as Homeless Man

== Reception ==
Writing for Variety, Dennis Harvey has mixed feeling about the script, praising Mark Burt's balance of "the primary character trio's unremarkable yet complex emotions, framing them in well-captured pub/construction site/family milieus." But felt that the "somewhat gratuitous running gag—glimpses of the titular, fictional chat show, a kinder-gentler Jerry Springer-type mix of real folks and hot-button topics—suddenly takes center stage." He added that this "good little movie abruptly grows loud, large and heavy-handed in the last reel." Harvey praised the acting saying that "there's much to enjoy here, particularly in the uniformly fine cast. … Shepherd … is a real find, convincingly rendering David as withdrawn, laddish and lovesick all at once. Apart from some killing-time interludes set to pop tunes, and the rather cheesy flash of horizontal-wipe scene transitions, helmer Aisling Walsh lends material both youthful breeziness and emotional weight."

Filmcritic.com's Christopher Null dismissed the film, declaring that if "you manage to stay interested, well, you're a stouter fellow than I."

TV Guide's Troy Lambert wrote that despite "the reality-challenged script, director Aisling Walsh delivers decent performances from the cast, especially Shepherd, Simm and Fraser as the unlikely three-way."
