= The Last Chancers =

2002 British television sitcom

- Genre: Sitcom
- No. of series: 1
- No. of episodes: 8

Original release
- Network: E4
- Release: November 21, 2002

The Last Chancers is British television sitcom, originally a one-off show screened under the Comedy Lab banner at 11:40pm on Thursday 21 November 2002. The show was later developed into a five-part series which was broadcast on E4 in December 2002. Currently the Channel 4 website has one series consisting of eight episodes listed.

== History ==
The show was initially screened under the Comedy Lab banner. Stephen Merchant directed the initial screening, which featured the actors Adam Buxton and Steve John Shepherd. Channel 4 subsequently slated the show for production in two instalments. Tony MacMurray and Buxton wrote The Last Chancers series. The show is a comedy drama.

== Cast ==
- Adam Buxton - Johnny
- Steve John Shepherd - Paul
- Kevin Bishop - Dan
- Patrick Driver - Brian
- Tony MacMurray - Alex
- Alice Lowe - Claire
- Joe van Moyland - Tom

== Crew ==
- Tony MacMurray - Writer
- Stephen Merchant - Director
- James Harding - Executive Producer
- Richard Osborne - Executive Producer
- Sally Martin - Producer

== Reception ==
In a mixed review, Rupert Smith of The Guardian wrote, "Any programme that involves puking, guitar solos and incredibly stupid drummers is always going to get a thumbs-up from me, but I wished The Last Chancers had decided whether it was vicious satire, feelgood comedy or laddish high-jinks." Referring to Valerie Edmond, The Sunday Times television critic John Dugdale criticized the show, writing, "Underused on TV since The Crow Road, Edmond is a welcome signing; but the comedy's problem is its hero, who suffers as many humiliations as Brent and Alan Partridge but lacks their compelling and richly imagined awfulness."

The Independent's Thomas Sutcliffe praised the show, calling it "quite strongly reminiscent of Peep Show, with its anti-climactic rhythms and loser slapstick, but good enough not to suffer by the comparison". In a positive review, Gabrielle Starkey of The Times said the show is "well observed and written", "funny", and found every character to be "well-defined and instantly recognisable without being total cliches".
