= Roxy Mitchell =

Fictional character from EastEnders

- EastEnders character
- Rita Simons as Roxy Mitchell (2016)
- Portrayed by: Rita Simons (2007–2019, 2023); Elodie de Rohan Willner (2022 flashback)
- Duration: 2007–2017, 2019, 2022–2023, 2027-
- First appearance: Episode 3405; 24 July 2007
- Last appearance: Episode 6688; 27 April 2023
- Created by: Dominic Treadwell-Collins
- Introduced by: Diederick Santer (2007); Kate Oates (2019); Chris Clenshaw (2022, 2023)
- Spin-off appearances: EastEnders: E20 (2010)
In-universe information
- Other names: Roxy Slater
- Occupation: Barmaid; Businesswoman; DJ; Pub landlady; Bar manager; Market trader
- Family: Mitchell/Slater
- Father: Archie Mitchell
- Mother: Glenda Mitchell
- Stepmother: Peggy Mitchell
- Sisters: Ronnie Mitchell
- Half-brothers: Danny Mitchell
- Husband: Sean Slater (2008–2009); Alfie Moon (2013–2014)
- Daughters: Amy Mitchell
- Uncles: Eric Mitchell; Clive Mitchell
- Nephews: James Branning; Matthew Mitchell Cotton
- Nieces: Danielle Jones
- First cousins: Phil Mitchell; Grant Mitchell; Sam Mitchell
- Other relatives: Billy Mitchell; Ben Mitchell; Louise Mitchell; Ricky Branning; Lola Pearce; Lexi Pearce

Roxy Mitchell (also Slater) is a fictional character from the BBC soap opera EastEnders, played by Rita Simons. Roxy arrived in Walford with her older sister Ronnie (Samantha Womack) on 24 July 2007 and decides to move permanently to Walford from Ibiza where they ran a bar together. Roxy is the younger of the two sisters. She is described as the "fire", as opposed to Ronnie's "ice". Simons took a temporary hiatus in 2016, with Roxy off screen from 1 January until 4 May 2016. Following the announcement that Womack would be leaving the series, Simons' departure was also announced. Roxy departed the series in scenes broadcast on 1 January 2017, when she drowned in a hotel swimming pool along with Ronnie. Simons returned in 2019 to record a voiceover as Roxy, which was broadcast on 3 May 2019. A younger version of Roxy, played by Elodie de Rohan Willner, appeared in a flashback episode broadcast on 5 September 2022, which focuses on the Mitchell family in the 1970s. Simons reprised her role on 27 April 2023 for a one-off appearance as a hallucination to her daughter, Amy Mitchell (Ellie Dadd).

During Roxy's time on the show she has been married twice — to Sean Slater (Robert Kazinsky) and Alfie Moon (Shane Richie) — and engaged an additional three times — to Damian (James Hiller), Aleks Shirovs (Kristian Kiehling) and Dean Wicks (Matt Di Angelo). Her major storylines have included the paternity of her daughter Amy, becoming landlady of The Queen Victoria, becoming a millionaire before squandering all the money on frivolous spending, her popular friendship with Christian Clarke (John Partridge), a feud with Alfie's ex-wife Kat Slater (Jessie Wallace), one-night stands with her sister's two husbands Jack Branning (Scott Maslen) and Charlie Cotton (Declan Bennett), Dean's attempted rape of her, becoming a drugs mule, and drowning in a hotel swimming pool alongside Ronnie on New Years' Day 2017. The character has proved popular with viewers, with Simons winning the "Best Newcomer" award at the Digital Spy Soap Awards in 2008 for her role in the soap opera.

== Creation ==
=== Promotion ===
Both Mitchell sisters were featured heavily in a BBC marketing campaign. Several promos aired on the BBC network in summer 2007. Using the slogan "The square, under new management", one promo depicted both sisters as party girls, dancing, serving tequila in The Queen Victoria public house (The Vic), shocking the older residents with their raunchy antics and squirting men with a soda siphon to the tune of "The Girls" by Calvin Harris. This scene was recreated for the sisters' final episode in 2017.

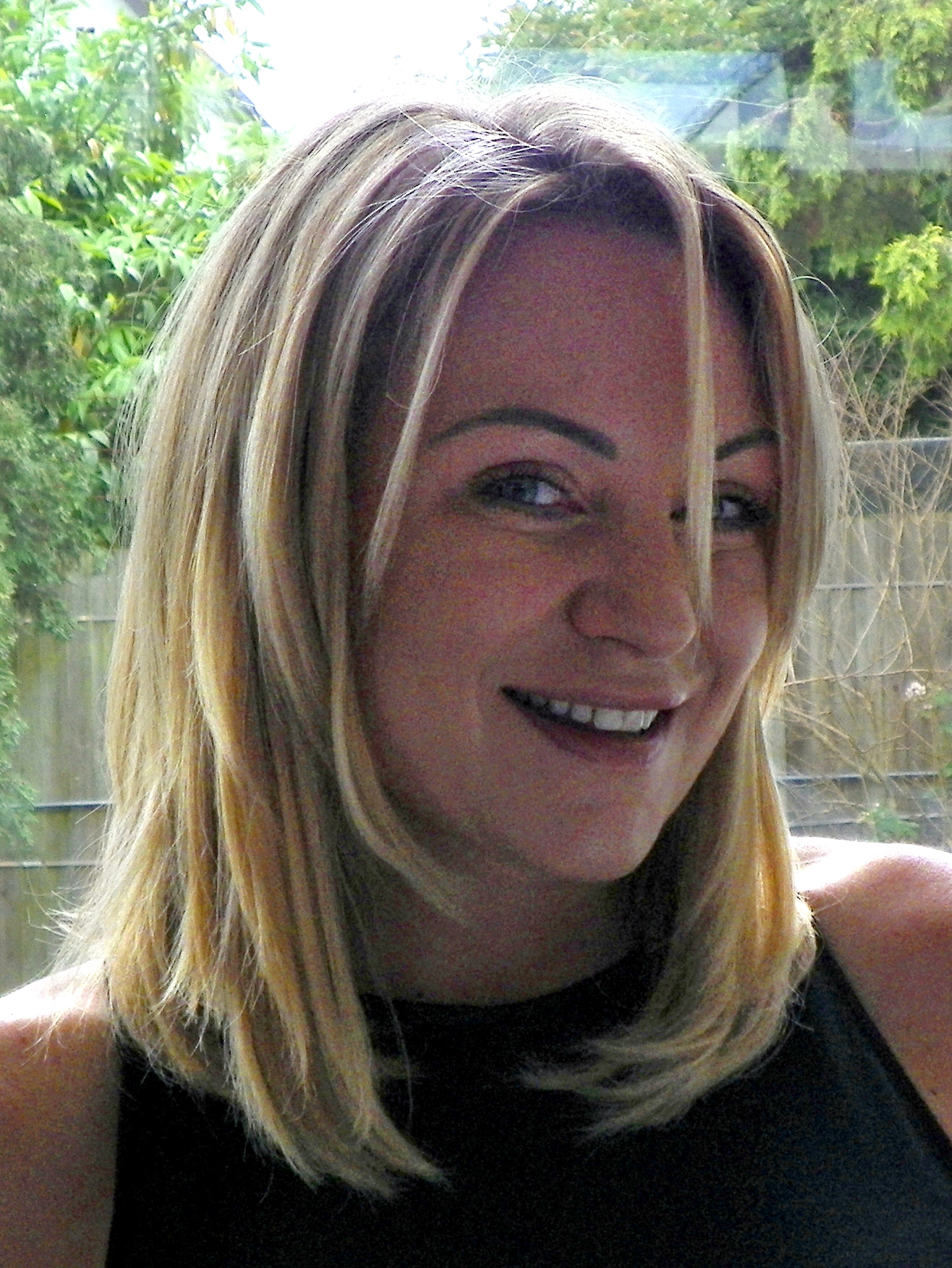
Rita Simons portrayed Roxy.

Two other trailers featured Ronnie and Roxy (Samantha Womack and Rita Simons) speaking individually. To the instrumental sound of "Little Green Bag" by George Baker (famously used in the Quentin Tarantino film Reservoir Dogs), each sister discussed their sibling, giving snippets of information on their personality and the dynamics of their relationship. Discussing Ronnie, Roxy said "My big sister Ronnie, she'd do anything to stop me getting hurt, including getting hurt herself. Boy she means business. We mean business. We're the Mitchell sisters after all... and you don't wanna find that out the hard way." Discussing Roxy, Ronnie said "Roxy will always be my kid sister. Fights, broken hearts, over the years we've had them all. She can be quite a handful, and she's definitely gonna stir things up around here. But remember, wherever Roxy Mitchell is... I'm right behind."

The promotion was received favourably by Leigh Holmwood, television journalist for The Guardian newspaper and MediaGuardian.co.uk. He commented, "now there's more to the long running BBC1 soap, apparently...Yes, it's the new sexed-up, soft focus, raunchy EastEnders trailer and it's hitting your TV screens now. In a bid to welcome the Mitchell sisters to Albert Square, the beeb have pulled out all the stops and come up with a very slick marketing campaign indeed." Referencing to the soap's reputation for being miserable and depressing, Holmwood said that the upbeat trailers were "about as un-EastEnders as you can get...Maybe the arrival of Roxy and Ronnie will herald a new golden age for the soap? Or maybe the BBC marketing department is just very good at putting a trailer together..."

In addition to the trailers, the BBC also planned a "glitzy" EastEnders BBC Radio 1 competition to promote the arrival on the Mitchell sisters, called "I love R&R" (Ronnie and Roxy). It ran from the end of June 2007, and included online promotion and video via the website iloverandr.com. The prize consisted of VIP tickets to a special party, which was to be attended by EastEnders actors and Radio 1 DJ Dave Pearce. Despite inviting the winners to attend, Radio 1 cancelled the event due to orders from BBC director general Mark Thompson, who called a halt to all BBC radio, TV and online competitions following a review of its programming, which uncovered scores of editorial breaches. Radio 1 reportedly decided to cancel the promotion as a "precautionary measure", though it is unknown whether the competition breached the BBC ban. Winners were instead told that they would be getting a tour of the EastEnders set, and the website was closed down on 26 July 2007.

=== Personality ===
Simons has described Roxy's insecurities, commenting: "whatever insecurities she's got, she has a shag".

== Development ==
Discussing the storyline which saw Roxy sleep with Ronnie's boyfriend, Jack Branning, Simons has said: "This is by far the worst Roxy has ever felt in her entire life. The guilt is absolutely killing her. I really hope the viewers sympathise with her Filming was hard and it got to the stage where she couldn't even look at Sam without crying. What she's done to Ronnie is so out of order, but if she could take it back, she would." Making it clear that what happened between Roxy and Jack was a one-off, she stated: "There's no lingering attraction between them [...] He makes Roxy's skin crawl." Simons also considered the outcome were Ronnie to find out about the betrayal, speculating: "One thing the Mitchells are good at is sweeping things under the carpet. And these girls have been through so much together. Perhaps in time, Ronnie could find it in her heart to forgive Roxy..." She mentioned the character's relationship with friend Christian Clarke, assessing that Roxy would be "really lost without him. He's her rock".

With the introduction of Roxy and Ronnie's mother, Glenda Mitchell (Glynis Barber) in 2010, Simons stated that Roxy had Archie's genes while Ronnie had Glenda's. Before Glenda's introduction, Archie is murdered by an unseen person, and Simons stated that she did not think Roxy was the killer, but said that in the last few days of Archie's life, she saw what he was really like, though she believed that Roxy would still forgive Archie regardless.

In December 2010, Simons stated she hoped that Roxy would have a new romance, saying "She's supposed to be the slapper of the Square—but hardly. Okay, she slept with Jack Branning once, was married to Sean and had a thing with Dr Al for about five minutes. But she hasn't had a bit of stuff for ages, so I think she's due some romance. Not that there's anyone on the Square she fancies. [...] She wants nothing more than a ring on her finger and to settle down, but she's a loose cannon, so I don't think she's going to get that anytime soon."

Discussing Roxy's friendship with Alfie Moon (Shane Richie), Simons told Soaplife that although Roxy flirts with Alfie, she would not steal him from his wife Kat (Jessie Wallace). Roxy is the only person to ask Alfie how he feels after the death of his son Tommy Moon, which Simons said showed how close Roxy and Alfie have become as friends. The actress commented, "She cares about Alfie and can see that a lot of what he's feeling is hidden behind his sparky exterior. She's a bit like that too."

In 2011, Roxy agrees to become a surrogate mother for Christian and his boyfriend Syed Masood. Simons explained that although Roxy would do anything for Christian out of love for him, she probably agrees for selfish reasons as well, as she is a single mother and wants what her friends have. She expressed a wish for Roxy to grow up and be less moody. Simons also said she wanted Roxy to be successful in a forthcoming revenge storyline following Roxy's discovery that Phil and Shirley stole her money, telling Soaplife magazine, "[The plan is] to steal back the money [Phil] stole from her. Glenda's in on it with Roxy and they plan to rob the club for what's rightfully Roxy's."

In April 2011, Roxy discovers that Ronnie swapped her dead baby, James, with Kat Moon's healthy son, Tommy. Speaking to Digital Spy, Simons discussed Roxy and Ronnie's relationship and how Ronnie's crime affects them. She stated that Roxy is loyal to Ronnie, despite Ronnie's mistakes, and would stand by her, but has conflicting feels as she finds it hard to come to terms with what Ronnie did. She called Roxy "quite a moral person", but her loyalty to her sister would most likely win. She said it is hard on their relationship, comparing it to when Roxy discovered that Ronnie was raped by their father as a child. Roxy tries to help release Ronnie from prison, and Simons said the storyline marks a transition for Roxy as she starts to grow up and stand on her own feet with Ronnie out of her every-day life.

=== Relationship with Alfie Moon ===
"There's undeniable chemistry between Alfie and Roxy, but at the end of the day, he's still married to Kat and he loves her to bits. Plus, I'm not sure whether Alfie would want to have a relationship with Roxy – she's got a lot of baggage."

— Shane Richie (2012)

In March 2012, Roxy realises that she is in love with Alfie Moon (Shane Richie). Alfie and Roxy share a strong friendship and Roxy starts to see him as her "ideal man". After a confrontation with Cora Cross (Ann Mitchell), Roxy goes to see Alfie and they have a heart-to-heart which leads Alfie to hug Roxy, making her realise that she is in love with him. Richie admitted that he did not want Alfie to cheat on Kat with Roxy. Alfie was tipped to face temptation as the storyline developed. Speaking to an Inside Soap writer, Richie commented "As far as Alfie's concerned, he's a happily married man. He can see that Roxy is flirting with him, but he just thinks she's being friendly. They've got a great friendship and enjoy some good banter together, but Alfie banters with half of Albert Square."

The following month, it was revealed that Roxy would confess her feelings to Alfie. Simons stated that she did not want Roxy and Alfie to have an affair, saying "Roxy knows it can't happen, but she can't help being in love with him. She leaves The Vic and says she just can't work there any longer. She just decides she has to leave because he goes on and on about Kat. It's too much for her." Simons added that she wanted the storyline to be "slow-burning". Simons later admitted that she does not know whether she will be sharing an on-screen kiss with Richie. Speaking to Press Association, Simons commented "It's been lovely to work with Shane, he's a great actor. We haven't had a kissing scene yet, I don't know if we will. He's a very generous actor." Roxy later daces more heartbreak when her friend Christian Clarke (John Partridge) says that Alfie does not love her, leading to Roxy denying this saying that there is definitely something between them.

It was revealed that Roxy will confess her feeling for Alfie to his wife Kat Moon (Jessie Wallace) when she returns to the square. A source told the Daily Star Sunday "Everyone has been eagerly awaiting Kat's return to Albert Square and it doesn't disappoint. Roxy confesses all in a bid to stay on friendly terms with Kat and Alfie. He then decides the best distraction would be to set up a football team." Kat manages to keep her temper following Roxy's revelations but warns her that she is not to do any further shifts in the pub and is to leave immediately, leading to Roxy moving on from Alfie.

=== Departure and death ===
On 18 August 2016, it was reported that Roxy would be leaving the series in 2017 along with Ronnie after executive producer Sean O'Connor chose to write them both out. A spokesperson said: "We can confirm that Rita Simons will be leaving EastEnders. Having joined the show in 2007, Rita immediately won the hearts of the audience in the role of Roxy Mitchell and between her and Samantha Womack they created one of the most iconic duos EastEnders has ever seen. Alongside Samantha, Rita was recently offered to take part in the same big storyline that will see the Mitchell sisters depart Walford forever, but we will not be releasing any further details at this time. We wish Rita all the best for the future."

Following the 1 January 2017 episode in which Ronnie and Roxy drown in a swimming pool, the BBC released a 10-second alternate ending clip on their Snapchat account, in which Ronnie survives, finding Roxy's corpse on a pool table with Jack. It then cuts to a hospital where Ronnie is shown grieving when Roxy dies in hospital from a suspected drug overdose.

== Storylines ==
Roxy arrives in Walford with her sister, Ronnie Mitchell (Samantha Womack), from Ibiza, and they help run their aunt Peggy Mitchell's (Barbara Windsor) public house, The Queen Victoria. Roxy's philandering fiancé Damian (James Hillier) follows them to Walford, and Roxy seduces him for money so she and Ronnie can buy the local nightclub. However, Jack Branning (Scott Maslen) usurps Roxy, buying the club and going into partnership with Ronnie, whom he also dates. Roxy starts dating Sean Slater (Robert Kazinsky), but Ronnie tries to break them up when she discovers Sean is a drug dealer. It later emerges Roxy was once addicted to cocaine. After arguing with Ronnie, Roxy gets extremely drunk and has sex with Jack. She later discovers she is pregnant and tells Sean that he is the father, while she and Ronnie plan to return to Ibiza. They leave, but Ronnie soon returns looking for Roxy, revealing that after they argued in Ibiza, she disappeared. It transpires Roxy is living with their father Archie Mitchell (Larry Lamb) in Weymouth, to Ronnie's horror. Roxy is adamant she will live with Archie but Sean persuades her to return to Walford, telling her he loves her. They move in together upon their return, and later marry. Roxy goes into premature labour and gives birth to a girl, named Amy (Amelie Conway), after Ronnie's daughter who was adopted as a newborn. Roxy and Sean plan to move to Dagenham, but then Sean discovers Jack is Amy's father on Christmas Day. He pretends to forgive Roxy and asks her to move away with him. He drives Roxy and Amy to a frozen lake, revealing he intends to kill them. Roxy gets Amy to safety, but she and Sean fall through the ice. They both survive, and in the wake of this Sean flees. Roxy then begins dating local GP Al Jenkins (Adam Croasdell), however their relationship ends when someone complains that he is seeing his patient.

Archie continually attempts to ruin Roxy's relationship with Ronnie, but it takes Roxy a long time to acknowledge the extent of her father's duplicity and his attempts to destroy Ronnie. Archie is murdered, having made numerous enemies in Walford. Roxy inherits Archie's estate, including £3 million. Following Archie's funeral, Roxy meets their younger brother Danny Mitchell (Liam Bergin) for the first time; they invite him to stay. He gains Roxy's trust, but she is unaware that he and their estranged mother Glenda Mitchell (Glynis Barber) are planning to steal her inheritance. Glenda double-crosses Danny, exposing the con, claiming Danny has been abusing her and that he is not really Archie's son. Roxy tells Danny to leave and asks Glenda to stay. Roxy spends frivolously until she only has £20,000 left and this is stolen by her cousin Phil Mitchell (Steve McFadden) and his partner Shirley Carter (Linda Henry). Glenda, who is having an affair with Phil, discovers the theft; when Phil dumps her, she urges Roxy to steal back her money as revenge, but they are caught. Phil manages to convince Roxy that it is Glenda who stole her money; he plants money in Glenda's wardrobe and Roxy sends her away.

Roxy agrees to be a surrogate mother for her gay friend Christian Clarke (John Partridge) and his partner Syed Masood (Marc Elliott) in 2011, but despite their attempt, she does not become pregnant. Roxy is left mortified upon discovering Ronnie's newborn baby, James Branning, died of sudden infant death syndrome and Ronnie swapped her baby with Kat Moon's (Jessie Wallace) newborn, Tommy, who is also the biological son of Roxy's boyfriend Michael Moon (Steve John Shepherd). Before Ronnie is tried in court, Michael attempts to frame Ronnie for kidnapping Tommy a second time to ensure she will receive a custodial sentence. Roxy finishes with Michael as a result, but the damage sticks and, to Roxy's horror, Ronnie is given three years imprisonment. When Ben Mitchell (Joshua Pascoe) babysits Amy, she almost drowns in the bath when he leaves her alone. She is revived but Jack accuses Roxy of neglect then attempts to gain custody of Amy; he is awarded this temporarily and stops Roxy having any contact with Amy. Roxy hires a solicitor, Jimmie Broome (Samuel James), who suggests she discredit Jack. The animosity has a negative effect on Amy, so Roxy and Jack agree not to argue in front of her. They momentarily soften towards each other, which leads to sex, but after Roxy discovers Jack has forged her signature to get Amy a passport, she believes he is intending to flee the country with her daughter. She threatens to report this, and Jack withdraws his bid for custody; Amy is returned to her mother.

Roxy is comforted by her friend and boss, Alfie Moon (Shane Richie), after her attempts to seduce Max Branning (Jake Wood) are made public. Realising she has feelings for Alfie, she confesses she loves him. Although Alfie admits to being tempted, he remains faithful to his wife Kat, who is away visiting family. Roxy and Alfie remain friends and colleagues despite Roxy's growing affection for him. After Alfie goes to visit Kat, Roxy becomes concerned for Jean Slater's (Gillian Wright) welfare and asks Alfie to return home. He returns with Kat, who throws Roxy out. Seeing that Alfie is in financial difficulty, Roxy gives him a loan from Amy's Child Trust Fund. Suspicious of Roxy and Alfie's friendship, Kat confronts Roxy and she admits she had a crush on Alfie. Kat sacks her from the pub and she moves back in with Phil. Phil once again takes control of the Queen Vic kicking Kat and Alfie out due to unpaid rent. He then appoints cousin Roxy as manager once again running it alongside Alfie and Kat. Roxy has brief flings with AJ Ahmed (Phaldut Sharma) and Michael, who she moves in with for a short time. When Alfie and Kat split up, Alfie asks Roxy to live with him and they declare their love for each other. Roxy is delighted when Alfie decides to divorce Kat, though it leads to more hostility between Kat and Roxy, which leads to a physical fight.

Roxy and Alfie decide to try for a baby and Kat is upset about this. When a builder, Josef (Aleksander Mikic), tries to steal money from the pub's till and later the safe, Kat helps Roxy to stop him and Roxy thanks Kat but then accuses her of trying to win Alfie back. Initially Kat promises Roxy that she will not tell Alfie about the incident, but when Roxy tells Janine Butcher (Charlie Brooks) that Kat is having a relationship with her estranged husband Michael, Kat tells Roxy that she has to tell Alfie about the attempted robbery. Roxy is later delighted when she discovers that Kat and Alfie's divorce has been finalised, but is upset when Alfie does not tell her about it. Alfie proposes to Roxy and she accepts.

Roxy does not tell Alfie that Ronnie is due to be released from prison soon, but when he finds out, he forbids Roxy from meeting her at the prison gates. Instead, Kat meets Ronnie and brings her back to Walford. Ronnie and Roxy spend time together while Alfie is out, but he returns early to find them together, so tells Roxy to choose between him and Ronnie. Roxy chooses Alfie, but is miserable, so starts seeing Ronnie in secret. Michael sees them and tells Alfie, who nearly ends his and Roxy's engagement, but instead, tells Roxy they must leave Walford immediately to sort out their relationship. When they return, Roxy tells Ronnie she can no longer see her, but Alfie sees Roxy crying, so announces their wedding date and invites Ronnie to the wedding. Alfie and Ronnie spend time together, but she is suspicious that he still has feelings for Kat, and warns him not to hurt Roxy. However, after the death of Michael, even Roxy notices how Alfie looks to Kat for comfort. At Roxy's hen party, Ronnie expresses her doubts about the upcoming marriage to Roxy, and the sisters argue. This leads to Roxy declaring that she does not want Ronnie at the wedding. Ronnie attends anyway and the sisters reconcile. Kat walks in during the ceremony, but Alfie continues his wedding vows and they marry. However, Roxy soon realises that Alfie still loves Kat and orders him to go to her as she is leaving for Ibiza. He does so, and Ronnie and Phil worry about Roxy, who gets drunk and humiliates herself. Phil then gets revenge on Alfie on Roxy's behalf by selling The Queen Vic. Roxy has sex with Carl White (Daniel Coonan) and they begin a relationship, much to Phil and Ronnie's annoyance, especially as Roxy is not looking after Amy. Ronnie tries to get Carl to break up with Roxy, and when he refuses, she buys tickets for her and Roxy to return to Ibiza. Carl tries to outmaneuver Ronnie by inviting Roxy on a holiday of his own, but when he fails to turn up Roxy leaves with Ronnie for Ibiza instead.

They return to Walford three months later and Ronnie confesses to Roxy that the reason Carl didn't show up to take her away was because Ronnie had murdered in him in self-defence several hours earlier. Despite initially struggling with the confession, Roxy forgives her sister, and together they buy their own house on the square. When Carl's mother, Nora White (Lynn Farleigh), arrives looking for Carl, Roxy wants to help convince her that Carl has moved away from Walford, but Ronnie intervenes and pretends to be her instead. Ronnie pays Aleks Shirovs (Kristian Kiehling) to date Roxy, but she becomes distrusting of him and tells him to stop. Aleks continues to date her and falls for her, acting as a father-figure to Amy (now Abbie Knowles). Roxy discovers that Ronnie was paying Aleks to date her, but eventually forgives Aleks when he declares his love for her publicly. When Alfie tells her that Aleks is married to Marta Shirovs (Noeleen Comiskey) and has a daughter Ineta Shirovs (Gledisa Osmani), they break up. Aleks convinces her that they have separated. Ronnie warns Roxy about her being a mistress; she orders her to give him an ultimatum. She does, and he arranges a holiday.

On her wedding day to Charlie Cotton (Declan Bennett), Ronnie goes into labour. On the way to the hospital, Roxy, Charlie and Ronnie are all involved in a car accident after Charlie's father Nick Cotton (John Altman) cut the brakes as the vehicle crashes. Emma Summerhayes (Anna Acton) is killed after being run over by the car and Ronnie is seriously injured and comatised. While Ronnie is in her coma, Roxy and Charlie have sex, later agreeing that it was a mistake. Later, Charlie learns that Roxy has feelings for him. Aleks finds out that Roxy and Charlie had sex, and he and Roxy make plans to leave for Latvia immediately, but they split after Roxy admits to Aleks she does not love him, so Aleks leaves with Marta and Ineta. Charlie admits to Roxy that he thinks he is falling in love with her but says they should stay apart. Roxy confesses to Ronnie about her one-night stand, and their relationship becomes strained.

Roxy turns to drink and has sex with Dean Wicks (Matt Di Angelo), later admitting that she likes him. She asks Dean to keep their relationship secret, due to him being hated by the community for raping Linda Carter (Kellie Bright). Ronnie discovers their relationship and tries to stop them from seeing each other. However, they carry on seeing each other. Whilst Dean is hiding from Ronnie, he finds the hidden camera Ronnie is using to spy on Roxy and Charlie. When Ronnie threatens him, Dean tells Roxy about this, and, when Roxy confronts Ronnie, they argue, then Roxy moves in with Dean. When Ronnie and Charlie's marriage begins to fall apart after Ronnie has sex with Vincent Hubbard (Richard Blackwood), Roxy tries to convince Ronnie to repair the marriage for Matthew's sake. However, when Amy is due to go to France to visit Jack, Charlie asks Roxy if they can join her. After Roxy drops Amy off at the airport the next day, she learns that Charlie wants to take Matthew with them. Although initially hesitant, she says she wants to come with him. However, when she learns that Ronnie has been prescribed anxiety medication, she tells Ronnie the plan and they conspire against Charlie together. Roxy is stunned when Dean, jealous of Charlie, burns her with a hair straightener. Dean becomes insecure that Roxy is spending time working with Masood Ahmed (Nitin Ganatra), so employs her as manager of his salon. When she says he needs to take himself less seriously, Dean cuts a chunk out of her hair in anger, but immediately apologises and proceeds to give her a proper haircut. As a result of this, Ronnie worries about Dean trying to control Roxy. Roxy and Ronnie have a furious row over Charlie and Dean, which turns violent. Roxy then reports Ronnie's murder of Carl to the police. This results in Roxy fighting with Sharon Mitchell (Letitia Dean) as the Mitchells despair of Roxy not seeing Dean as a rapist. When Jack returns, he finds out from Mick Carter (Danny Dyer) that Dean raped Linda, so he packs Amy's belongings and removes her from Roxy's care, pointing out that Roxy's feisty personality has gone since she started dating Dean. As Roxy ends her engagement to Dean, who has assaulted her again, he attempts to rape her but Shirley interrupts. A tearful Roxy is found by Linda and her mother Elaine Peacock (Maria Friedman), who support her. Linda encourages her to tell the police, which Roxy does. Shirley then attempts to drown Dean who finally admits he raped Linda before running away from the police. Roxy is examined in the hospital with bruises and scars left by Dean on her body, and gives her statement. Roxy visits Glenda and decides to leave the country, but Glenda enlists Ronnie to try to stop her. They are unsuccessful after Roxy tells Ronnie she has controlled her all her life and she needs to be alone. Roxy leaves Amy with Jack, who also departs Walford shortly after, in January 2016. One month later, Roxy does not return for Dean's court case, where he pleads not guilty and is remanded in custody until a retrial in June, so Ronnie calls her to inform her of this.

She returns in May having been assaulted. She is hospitalised but discharges herself. Glenda has also returned, looking for Roxy as she took money from her and Danny before disappearing. Roxy tells Ronnie that she needs money to pay off a debt, so Ronnie gives her money, and Roxy gives some of it to Glenda as long as Glenda never returns to Walford. Roxy leaves, and when she returns, she tells Ronnie her debt is paid and she has money coming in. Jack refuses to let her see Amy. Roxy appears in discomfort and pain, and tells her relative Billy Mitchell (Perry Fenwick) that she has £10,000 worth of cocaine inside her and she thinks something has gone wrong. Jack and Jay Brown (Jamie Borthwick) find out, and when Roxy passes the bags of drugs through her system, she tells Jack and Billy she has flushed them but reveals to Jay that she has kept them, and he offers to help her sell them. However, they both change their minds for the sake of their families, and Roxy puts effort into finding work, and agrees to help Donna Yates (Lisa Hammond) on her market stall. Roxy starts a relationship with Andy Flynn (Jack Derges) but Roxy struggles with being intimate because her last relationship was with Dean, and she admits that she is not ready for a relationship. She later learns that Andy is in fact Gareth Jones, Ronnie's dead daughter Danielle Jones' (Lauren Crace) adoptive brother, who has been plotting revenge on Ronnie as he blames her for Danielle's death. Despite Andy telling Roxy that his feelings for her were genuine, she firmly believes that he used her to get to Ronnie and she coldly tells him to leave. Roxy is then left further distraught along with Linda when Dean is later found not guilty, despite Roxy and Dean's mother Shirley giving testimony in court.

Roxy struggles to be a good mother to Amy, especially when Ronnie suggests that Roxy take Amy shopping, but not knowing this, Jack books a trip to Paris, which upsets Roxy when she finds out, and when Roxy wants to buy an expensive gift for Amy's birthday, her credit card is declined. Roxy asks Ronnie to lend her the money, so Ronnie asks her to help Amy with her homework but afterwards Roxy says she enjoyed it so much she does not want any money for it. Roxy is then upset to discover that Ronnie and Jack plan to move out of London, taking Amy with them. Roxy is also angry when Jack decides to sell the house Ronnie and Roxy co-own, but he tells her she well get half of the money from the sale. Donna helps Roxy to realise that letting Amy live with Jack and Ronnie will be the best thing for Amy, but then Roxy suspects Jack of having an affair with Billy's partner Honey Mitchell (Emma Barton) and tells Ronnie this, but Jack denies it. Roxy also agrees to move away to be near Amy but soon changes her mind. Roxy fears that Amy will not remember her, and she starts drinking heavily but when Phil tells her off and she forgets to collect Amy from school, she realises her problems and asks Donna if she can change. Donna suggests that the best thing she can do for Amy may be to allow Ronnie to adopt her. After an emotional discussion, Ronnie agrees to the adoption. Roxy then starts using drugs again. On Ronnie's hen night, Roxy tells Ronnie that she is not going to the wedding and will be in Tenerife instead. Ronnie insists that Roxy is at the wedding and also asks her to move to Essex with her, Jack and Amy. A few nights later, Roxy embarrasses herself at the market traders' party after taking cocaine. She calls Glenda, who collects her.

Roxy returns a day later to pack her things and refuses to go to Ronnie's wedding in fear she will ruin it, saying she is going to move in with Glenda and Danny. However, she changes her mind after Ronnie shows how much Roxy means to her. At the wedding, Roxy agrees to give Ronnie away but is uncertain once more, believing Ronnie needs to tell Jack the truth about Roxy moving away with them before marrying him. Ronnie dismisses this, but runs off in tears when walking down the aisle. Roxy makes Ronnie tell Jack, who understands that Ronnie needs Roxy and agrees to let Roxy come with them. At the wedding party, Roxy and Max dance and flirt, and afterwards they go to her room for sex but are interrupted by Ronnie, who asks Roxy to join her while Jack reads the children a bedtime story. Ronnie and Roxy reminisce about their time on the square and talk optimistically about their future whilst getting increasingly drunk. They find the hotel's swimming pool and Roxy jumps in. Ronnie is shocked to see her unconscious at the bottom of the pool and attempts to rescue her, but her wedding dress weighs her down and she drowns alongside Roxy. Later, Jack is informed Roxy suffered a heart attack in the pool and he surmises cocaine was to blame. Following their funerals, an inquest into the deaths concludes that Roxy drowned following a cardiac arrest when hitting the cold water and both deaths are ruled as misadventure, however, Jack still blames Roxy for Ronnie's death.

In May 2019, Roxy's ex-husband Sean returns to Walford and picks Amy up from school. He hopes to reunite with Roxy, unaware of her death. Jack takes Sean to Ronnie and Roxy's grave where he reveals this to Sean. Jack blames Roxy's drug use for Ronnie's death which leads to them fighting by their grave. Sean wears his and Roxy's wedding ring and he later speaks to Roxy's gravestone, where he tells her that he will soon join her. Roxy's voice is later heard when Sean replays an old voicemail left by Roxy when they were married, before he unsuccessfully attempts suicide. In April 2023, Roxy appears as a hallucination to Amy (now portrayed by Ellie Dadd) at a family therapy meeting, where she tells her not to give up amidst Amy's ongoing struggles with her mental health and self-harming.

== Reception ==
Rita Simons won the 'Best Newcomer' award at the Digital Spy Soap Awards in 2008 for the part of Roxy and also collected an award at the Dublin awards and the TV Now awards. She also won the National Television Award 2008 for Best Newcomer. Singer Duncan James said that he watches EastEnders to follow Roxy. Speaking to Inside Soap, James said "I like to watch the show and see what they're doing with her character. Purely because Rita is one of my best friends." In August 2017, Simons and Womack were longlisted for Best Exit at the Inside Soap Awards, while Roxy and Ronnie's deaths were longlisted for Best Show-Stopper. Both nominations made their shortlists, but they did not win any awards. In 2020, Sara Wallis and Ian Hyland from The Daily Mirror placed Roxy 34th on their ranked list of the Best EastEnders characters of all time, writing that she had " a string of bad relationships, feuds and a coke habit".
