= Matt Lapinskas =

English actor (born 1989)

- Born: Matthew William Lapinskas; 27 February 1989 (age 37); Surrey, England
- Other name: Matt Lapinskas
- Education: Italia Conti Academy of Theatre Arts
- Occupation: Actor
- Years active: 2007–present
- Notable work: EastEnders; Dancing on Ice; Hollyoaks
- Spouse: Karina Hind (m. 2025)

Matthew William Lapinskas (born 27 February 1989) is an English actor, known for playing Anthony Moon in the BBC soap opera EastEnders from 2011 to 2012. He was a contestant in the eighth series of Dancing on Ice, finishing as the runner-up with skating partner Brianne Delcourt.

== Early life ==
Lapinskas was born in 1989 in Surrey and is of Canadian and Lithuanian origin from his father's side. He studied for a BTEC National Diploma in Performing Arts at Brooklands College, and became a member of their theatre company, where he won a number of accolades for his performance in The Opposite of People. He then went on to study at Italia Conti in London from 2007 to 2010, where he graduated with a BA (Hons) degree in Acting.

== Career ==
Lapinskas played a student in the 2007 Stephen Surjik film I Want Candy, and in 2011, he was cast in the BBC soap opera EastEnders, playing Anthony Moon. Of his casting, he said "I'm absolutely over the moon! It's been my lifetime ambition to be on EastEnders – I have watched it growing up with my nan, who is a big fan. I'm so pleased to get my first TV role, I just didn't believe it would be so big. I've met some of the cast I will be working with who were very friendly and welcoming and I can't wait to start filming". Lapinskas stated that he was "nervous" about debuting, but as he had shot an episode of EastEnders' spin-off EastEnders: E20 before appearing in the main show, he felt it helped him to feel more comfortable.

On 9 May 2012, Daniel Kilkelly of Digital Spy reported Lapinskas would be leaving EastEnders, and his character would depart on screen in the coming weeks. Of his exit, Lapinskas said "I'm having a fantastic time working on EastEnders and playing the role of Anthony Moon. Working with David Essex, Tony Discipline and the EastEnders cast has been an absolute pleasure. Although I will really miss EastEnders and everyone involved, I am very excited about future projects and what is next for me as an actor." In an interview with Inside Soap, Lapinskas said that EastEnders was his first job outside of drama school and added that he has learnt a lot from the people he worked with. He also added "I was quite disappointed when I found out Anthony would be leaving – I'd have liked to do a lot more stuff with him. It's a shame to not be a part of what's coming up."

In December 2012, he was revealed as one of 12 celebrities taking part in the eighth series of Dancing on Ice. Lapinskas was Dancing on Ice (Series 8) runner-up to Olympic bronze medalist Beth Tweddle. He then took part in the Dancing on Ice UK tour. Since the show, Lapinskas has played Prince Charming in pantomime productions in Bromley, Sunderland and Bournemouth. He also toured the country with Bill Kenwright's production of Joseph and the Amazing Technicolor Dreamcoat playing 'Pharaoh'. It was during this time that he met his current girlfriend Camilla Rowland.

Lapinskas has since moved onto stage roles as Messalla in the production of Ben Hur opposite Miles Yekinni as Ben Hur at The Hexagon theatre in Reading, Tony Manero in the production of Staying Alive in Jersey (both in 2017) and completed a film role in Red Devil shot in London in February 2018.

In April 2018, Lapinskas starred as a young Victor Frankenstein in Mary Shelley's Frankenstein: Modern Day Prometheus at the Barnfield Theatre in Exeter.

On 30 August 2022, Lapinskas first appeared as Villainor/Karl in Ian Hallard's comedy Horse-Play, which opened at the Riverside Studios in London and was due to run until 24 September 2022.

== Filmography ==
Year	Title	Role	Notes
2007	I Want Candy	Student	Film; minor role
2011–2012	EastEnders	Anthony Moon	Regular role; 102 episodes
2011	EastEnders: E20	Anthony Moon	1 episode
2013	Dancing on Ice	Contestant	Partnered with Brianne Delcourt
2018	Dead Ringer	Detective Burbank	Film
2019	The Seven	Michael	Film
2022	Hollyoaks	Alex Ramsdan	Guest role
