= Steve John Shepherd =

English actor

- Born: 1 August 1973 (age 53); Plaistow, London, England
- Occupation: Actor
- Years active: 1996–present
- Spouse: Anna Wilson-Jones
- Children: 3

Stephen John Shepherd (born 1 August 1973) is an English actor. He is known for his portrayals of Jo in the TV drama This Life and Michael Moon in the soap opera EastEnders from 2010 to 2013.

== Early life and education ==
Shepherd was born in London in 1973, and grew up first in the East End of London, and then Essex. His mother is of English and Burmese ancestry, and his father is of English and Chinese ancestry.

He attended St Bonaventure's Catholic School, where he first discovered an interest in acting. He first went to ballet school but was not a good dancer, and after that attended drama school.

== Career ==
Shepherd's first well-known role was in 1996 in This Life. He remained in the role for two series (1996–1997). Other credits include The Best Man (2005), The One That Got Away (1996), Maisie Raine (1998), Virtual Sexuality (1999), G:MT – Greenwich Mean Time (1999), Forgive and Forget (2000), Star Wars: Episode II – Attack of the Clones (2002), Boudica (2003), Layer Cake (2004), The Last Chancers (2004), Too Much Too Young (2005), and Dalziel and Pascoe. He played Paul in Channel 4's Plus One (2007) and appeared in Piaf at the Donmar Warehouse until 20 September 2008.

Shepherd appeared in BBC Three sitcom Lunch Monkeys as Charlie Brierson. On 17 January 2010, he appeared in the second episode of the second series of Being Human as Carl, a gay vampire. In 2011 he played the role of child abductor Max "Bag Man" Harding in the BBC series Waking the Dead.

In July 2010, Shepherd's casting as Michael Moon, the cousin of Alfie Moon, in EastEnders was announced. He made his first appearance on 1 October 2010. In May 2011, Shepherd was nominated in the Best Soap Newcomer category at the 2011 TV Choice Awards for his portrayal of Michael. In March 2013, Shepherd announced that he would be leaving EastEnders later that year. Shepherd's final storyline surrounded Michael's plan to murder his wife Janine Butcher. Michael's last episode was on 1 November 2013, when he was killed by Janine. Shepherd left the show to explore new roles.

== Personal life ==
As of April 2014 Shepherd was living in west London with his wife Anna Wilson-Jones and their three children.

== Filmography ==
=== Screen credits ===
Year	Title	Role	Notes
1996	The One That Got Away	Small Bob	TV movie
1996	This Life	Jo	TV drama
1998-1999	Maisie Raine	DC George Kyprianou	Main cast (2 seasons - 12 eps)
1998	RPM	Rudy	
1999	Virtual Sexuality	Jason, Narcissus Guy	
1999	G:MT – Greenwich Mean Time	Sam	
2000	Forgive and Forget	David O'Neil	TV movie
2001	Me Without You	Carl	
2001	From Hell	Special Branch Constable	
2002	Star Wars: Episode II – Attack of the Clones	Naboo lieutenant	
2003	Boudica	Catus	
2004	Layer Cake	Tiptoes	
2004	The Last Chancers	Paul	TV series; 2 episodes
2005	The Best Man	James	
2006	Dalziel and Pascoe	Steve Pitt	Episode: "A Death in the Family"
2007	Too Much Too Young	Vic Chambers	
2007	Bonkers	Andrew	
2009	Plus One	Paul	
2010	Being Human	Carl	TV series; 1 episode
2010–2013	EastEnders	Michael Moon	TV series; 304 episodes
2015	Christmas Eve	Glen	
2019	Hetty Feather	Ambrose	TV series; 9 episodes
2020	London Kills	Adrian Cook	1 episode
2020	Shakespeare & Hathaway: Private Investigators	Gerald FitzAllan	Episode: "The Sticking Place"
2022, 2025	Karen Pirie	Simon Lees	

=== Stage ===
Year	Title	Role	Theatre	Notes
2022	Tammy Faye	Jimmy Swaggart / Archbishop of Canterbury / Ronald Reagan	Almeida Theatre	
2023–2025	Harry Potter and the Cursed Child	Draco Malfoy	Palace Theatre	
