= List of EastEnders characters introduced in 2012 =

EastEnders logo

The following are characters who first appeared in the BBC soap opera EastEnders during 2012 listed by order of first appearance. New characters were introduced by Bryan Kirkwood, executive producer. He stepped down from the role in April. His last episode was on 13 July 2012. From 16 July, characters were introduced by his successor, Lorraine Newman.

The first character to be introduced was the undertaker, Les Coker (Roger Sloman). The first regular character to be announced was Ray Dixon (Chucky Venn), the biological father of Morgan Butcher (Devon Higgs), followed by Alice Branning (Jasmyn Banks), the daughter of Derek Branning (Jamie Foreman) and, Alice's brother, Joey (David Witts). June 2012 also saw the first birth of the year: Janine Butcher (Charlie Brooks) and Michael Moon's (Steve John Shepherd) daughter, Scarlett. July saw the arrival of Masood Ahmed's (Nitin Ganatra) brother, AJ Ahmed (Phaldut Sharma). July also saw the second birth of the year: Lola Pearce's (Danielle Harold) daughter Lexi, Newman's first introduction. After the announcement that Sharon Rickman (Letitia Dean) was returning, her son Dennis Rickman Jnr (Harry Hickles), was introduced, along with guest character, Sharon's fiancé John Hewland (Jesse Birdsall). Danny Pennant (Gary Lucy) arrived in September, as part of a love triangle storyline involving Syed Masood (Marc Elliott) and Christian Clarke (John Partridge). Ava Hartman (Clare Perkins), the long-lost daughter of Cora Cross (Ann Mitchell) was introduced in November and Kirsty Branning (Kierston Wareing), Max's (Jake Wood) secret wife, made her first appearance on Christmas Day. December also saw the arrival of Zainab Khan's (Nina Wadia) family friend, Ayesha Rana (Shivani Ghai).

== Les Coker ==
Les Coker
- EastEnders character
- Portrayed by: Roger Sloman
- Duration: 2012, 2014–2016
- First appearance: Episode 4354; 9 January 2012
- Last appearance: Episode 5368; 14 October 2016
- Introduced by: Bryan Kirkwood (2012); Dominic Treadwell-Collins (2014)
In-universe information
- Other names: Christine (female alter-ego)
- Occupation: Funeral director
- Wife: Pam Coker
- Sons: Lawrie Coker
- Grandsons: Paul Coker

Les Coker, played by Roger Sloman, first appeared on 9 January 2012. He subsequently appeared in five episodes in 2012, before returning for an episode in 2014. Les was reintroduced as a regular character in April 2014 and continued to appear until 14 October 2016 when the character was axed from the show.

Les first appears when he visits Carol Jackson (Lindsey Coulson) and David Wicks (Michael French) to arrange Pat Evans' (Pam St Clement) funeral. He tells them he used to know Pat when he was an apprentice, implying he was her client when she was a prostitute, and offers a discount on the funeral. He says that he arranged funerals for many of the other local residents, including David's father Pete Beale (Peter Dean), Pat's husband Roy Evans (Tony Caunter), Ethel Skinner (Gretchen Franklin), Pat's former sister-in-law Pauline Fowler (Wendy Richard) and Archie Mitchell (Larry Lamb). He returns to meet Jean Slater (Gillian Wright) to finalise arrangements for the funeral of her daughter Stacey Branning (Lacey Turner). Jean is distressed to hear that Stacey has died, but Mo Harris (Laila Morse) reveals she has just spoken to Stacey on the phone, meaning Stacey is alive. Les apologises profoundly before leaving. Les is seen by Sasha Dixon (Rebecca Sanneh) doing business with Anthony Moon (Matt Lapinskas) and it turns out that when someone dies, Les offers to empty their house and sells the goods to Anthony for his business. Sasha and her employer, Cora Cross (Ann Mitchell), then ask Les to offer every other house to them for the charity shop. He attends a wake for a former Walford resident at The Queen Victoria public house, where Kim Fox (Tameka Empson) pretends to know the deceased, and talks to Les, successfully gaining Sasha a work experience placement with Les's firm. He attends the wake of a man previously known by Patrick Trueman (Rudolph Walker) and is annoyed when Cora turns up, as he has agreements with her and Anthony. Les later appears when Sasha starts her first day of work experience.

Les appears again to arrange Nick Cotton's (John Altman) funeral, although it is later revealed to be a scam in which Les is in on. Les moves his funeral business, Coker & Sons Funeral Parlour, to Turpin Road following the relocation of Pam's flower stall to Bridge Street Market. When walking home one night, Fatboy (Ricky Norwood) notices Les being handed money by Dot Branning's (June Brown) grandson, Charlie Cotton (Declan Bennett). Fatboy tries to tell Dot what Les and Charlie are up to, but is unsuccessful. In July, Les hires Billy Mitchell (Perry Fenwick) at the undertakers, however he is disappointed when Billy doesn't turn up for work on his first day. Pam is upset when Les insults Emma Summerhayes (Anna Acton) while drunk, fearful it will reveal a big secret they have been keeping; that she euthanised their dying son, Lawrie. Billy eventually establishes a good working relationship with Les and a friendship as they spend Christmas together. Billy discovers the business is deeply in debt and forces Les to tell Pam this. They vow no more secrets, but after Les meets with his "other woman", Claudette Hubbard (Ellen Thomas) and gives her an expensive necklace. Claudette and Pam are revealed to be old friends, as Claudette is a foster mother and Pam used to help children in care. Les holidays in Gran Canaria with Claudette, although Pam sees it as a coincidence when she learns from Claudette's foster daughter Donna Yates (Lisa Hammond) that they are both there at the same time.

Les arranges a party for the centenary of Coker & Sons, and Pam gets upset at the thought that their grandson, Paul (Jonny Labey), will not attend. The same day, Paul returns but is cold towards Les. He reveals he is aware of his long running affair with Claudette and that was why he went to work abroad in the first place, not because of Pam's decision to euthanise his father as they previously believed. Paul threatens to expose the affair to Pam so Les tries to end things with Claudette, but Claudette tells Les that it will not be that easy. Claudette's son Vincent Hubbard (Richard Blackwood) then becomes aware of the relationship between her and Les, and Paul tells Pam about it. Pam then finds Les's tie at Claudette's house, and when Les and Claudette give conflicting explanations, Pam leaves to stay with her sister. Les becomes very distraught at her departure, and Claudette urges him to tell Pam the truth, just as Pam returns and walks in on them together. Shortly after Claudette leaves the house, Pam urges Les to end the affair or their marriage is over. Two months later, Les visits Claudette for comfort after Pam refuses to speak to him on Lawrie's birthday. He later calls Claudette, telling her he cannot stop thinking about her, and makes an excuse to Pam to go and be with Claudette again. He is then caught in his underwear in Claudette's house by Donna, who concludes they are having an affair, and despite Les and Claudette denying it, Donna tells Pam what she saw. Pam then goes to Claudette's house and sets about destroying gifts from Les until Claudette says the presents are not hers, and Pam should ask Les about Christine. When Pam asks Les, he reveals that Christine is his secret feminine alter ego, where he dresses up in women's clothes and has done so since he was seven years old, but after they married he did not need Christine until Lawrie died, when the alter-ego became a grief outlet for him, and Claudette has been supporting this secret. Pam is horrified at him having lied to, and tells Les he disgusts her. However, Pam agrees to "meet" Christine. Les, as Christine, explains that this is how he can cope with things, as Christine is more open than Les, and he is still the same person. Pam apparently begins to accept this, but when Paul interrupts, Pam says she cannot accept it, so packs a bag and leaves, while Paul comforts Les. Paul manages to convince Pam to return home to talk to Les, but when she gets hesitant again, Les moves out to give Pam some time to think, and he moves in with Billy. Pam and Les have dinner together but she still cannot get the image of him dressed as Christine out of her mind, soLes burns all of Christine's clothes and photos and Pam agrees to take things one day at a time, but Babe Smith (Annette Badland) is watching and finds and pockets a surviving photo of Les dressed as Christine. Shortly after, Paul encourages Les to remind Pam of the man she first fell in love with and she agrees to his moving back in as long as they sleep in separate beds.

A few months later, Les spurns Babe, so she sends Les an anonymous email, blackmailing him over his crossdressing. When Pam notices money has been paid from their account, Les admits he has been blackmailed. The blackmailing continues regularly, and Pam starts to suspect Babe, and eventually they discover the truth. Les confides in Claudette and says he misses Christine, so she gives him some of her clothes and makeup that she still has. Stressed, Les dresses up again but is caught by Paul. Paul refuses to destroy Christine's things for Les, saying Les should not suffer for who he is. When Pam finds Les dressed as Christine, she chastises him and he suffers a heart attack. Billy sees him as he enters the ambulance. Billy calls Les a "pervert" to Pam, so she fires him from the funeral parlour. Pam then tells Les they should retire away from London and Les agrees; when Paul and his boyfriend Ben Mitchell (Harry Reid) find out, they decide they should take over the running of the funeral parlour. Paul's mother, Jenny Rawlinson (Amy Marston), arrives looking for him, but he only assumes she is the blackmailer and orders her away. Pam and Les vow to tell Paul who she is, but Paul is killed in a homophobic attack. Pam struggles to cope, refusing to talk to Les about Paul, so he considers dressing as Christine; he explains why he cross-dresses to Billy and gives him his job back. Les then decides to be strong for Pam so tells Claudette he will no longer be Christine, but the blackmailing continues, with Pam refusing to go to the police, but she tells Claudette that Babe is the blackmailer. After four months of blackmail, Claudette reveals this to Babe's family, and Babe, who has just been attacked by Abi Branning (Lorna Fitzgerald) and come close to death, tells Claudette that she now sees how bad she has been and regrets everything, so it will stop. Les and Pam later attend a court hearing for Paul's killers. Les calls one of them, Simon Atmore (Tom Palmer), a liar after he denies having anything to do with Paul's death. When they arrive home, Pam tells him he needs to be Christine again. Les later suffers a small heart attack after talking to Linda Carter (Kellie Bright) who tries to comfort him and he eventually dresses up as Christine. Les then asks Pam if she would consider leaving Walford together for a fresh start after the trial is over which she agrees. Les and Pam are delighted when Babe returns all of their money. However, they decide to leave and Les appoints Billy as the manager of Coker and Sons. Pam packs a box of Christine's wig and clothes suggesting she has accepted her. After saying an emotional farewell to his friends and after giving Billy his funeral hat, Les departs with Pam for a new life in Worthing.

=== Development and reception ===
Having been originally introduced as the funeral director who arranged Pat Evans' (Pam St Clement) funeral, Sloman appeared in one episode on 9 January 2012 as a guest character. He then appeared in five episodes between June and July 2012. Les was reintroduced for one episode on 25 March 2014 when he arranges Nick Cotton's (John Altman) funeral. Following this, Sloman was reintroduced as a regular cast member with Les' wife, Pam (Lin Blakley) being introduced also. Executive producer Dominic Treadwell-Collins said "Les and Pam are part of our plans to rejuvenate the show's older generation. It's already so exciting to watch the chemistry between Roger and Lin on set, playing characters who have been together for so long, they know each other inside out. Or so they think." Les and Pam arrived on 14 April 2014 when they relocated their funeral business to Turpin Road.

Sloman and Blakley were axed by new executive producer Sean O'Connor in 2016, with a show insider commenting, "Pam and Les have been a big part of the show over the past few months and with their current storyline, bosses felt that it was the right time for their characters to leave the Square. There is still plenty more drama to come from the Cokers before they leave Walford."

Of Pat and Les, Kate White of Inside Soap said "Pat had, erm, 'relations' with Mr Coker the undertaker. What a forward-thinking way to get a discount on your funeral." The Daily Mirror's Jane Simon commented on Les's scenes, saying "You don't often get laughs out of an undertaker, but the chap who turns up to arrange Pat's funeral has Carol Jackson spluttering into her tea." A reporter writing for the Inside Soap Yearbook described Pam and Les as a "soap favourite" and hoped they would "hurry home soon".

== Ray Dixon ==
Ray Dixon, played by Chucky Venn, is an ex-partner of Bianca Butcher (Patsy Palmer) and the father of her son Morgan Butcher (Devon Higgs). He made his first on screen appearance on 10 January 2012. Venn was cast in the role after hearing that producers were interested in him for the part. The character and casting were then announced on 15 November 2011.

Ray is a former army soldier with "discipline and [the ability] to handle himself in certain situations." He is also described as "noble" and "a man of principles". He also has a daughter, Sasha Dixon (Rebecca Sanneh). His storylines include meeting Morgan for the first time and having a relationship with Kim Fox (Tameka Empson). Ray left the soap on 28 May 2013.

== Gethin Williams ==
Gethin Williams
- EastEnders character
- Portrayed by: Bradley Freegard
- First appearance: Episode 4359; 17 January 2012
- Last appearance: Episode 4365; 27 January 2012
- Introduced by: Bryan Kirkwood
In-universe information
- Occupation: Chef

Gethin Williams, played by Bradley Freegard, appears on 17 and 27 January. He is Jane Beale's (Laurie Brett) former haute cuisine tutor, who attends a fundraising event organised by Jane after hearing about it on the radio. Impressed with her catering for the function, he asks her to interview for a job at his new restaurant. Jane does not want to take the job but, when Gethin rings the next day, her friend Tanya Jessop (Jo Joyner) arranges for them to meet up. Jane passes the interview, but reveals to Tanya that the restaurant is in Cardiff. Gethin returns to Walford to attend Jane's leaving party. Jane has doubts about leaving Walford but later assures Gethin she wants to take the job, with him revealing his plans to set up a restaurant in Paris, with Jane as sous chef.

Freegard auditioned for the part of Gethin but thought his audition did not go well because he found it "difficult without any sense of context to get the full grasp of what your character's all about." He filmed his scenes over two days in November 2011. Gethin is the first Welsh character in EastEnders since Huw Edwards, played by Richard Elis from 1996 to 1999.

== Sasha Dixon ==
Sasha Dixon
- EastEnders character
- Portrayed by: Rebecca Sanneh
- First appearance: Episode 4364; 26 January 2012
- Last appearance: Episode 4477; 14 August 2012
- Introduced by: Bryan Kirkwood
In-universe information
- Occupation: Student; Charity shop volunteer
- Father: Ray Dixon
- Mother: Deanne
- Half-brothers: Morgan Butcher

Sasha Dixon, played by Rebecca Sanneh, is the daughter of Ray Dixon (Chucky Venn) and half-sister to Morgan Butcher (Devon Higgs). She appears on 26 January 2012, and more regularly from 14 May 2012 onwards. The EastEnders website says that Sasha's father Ray sees Sasha as "being the best thing in his life, but he wishes her mother didn't exist." Ray is very loyal to Sasha, and Chucky Venn, who plays him, said that when Kim and Sasha fall out, he can create harmony between them.

Sasha first arrives in The Queen Victoria public house in search of her father. She reveals she has an interest in forensic pathology and is questioned by Kim Fox (Tameka Empson) about Ray's past relationships. Ray introduces her to Morgan, angering Morgan's mother, Bianca Butcher (Patsy Palmer). In May Sasha returns to stay with Ray, and his girlfriend Kim. Kim struggles to accept Sasha and worries that Sasha will make her look stupid. Kim then looks after Sasha, and after Sasha tells Kim about her interest in forensic science, Kim takes her to a murder scene. Kim exaggerates the details of the murder, which scares Sasha. Kim then hears from Ray that Sasha is a good dancer, but it emerges that she has no rhythm. Sasha then attends Kim's fitness class but does not enjoy it. When Kim opens her bed and breakfast, Sasha offers to help book theatre tickets for a customer. She is caught using Kim's credit card at school and gets a detention for it. However, she reveals she tried to get a detention on purpose, just to avoid working for Kim. When playing basketball with Kim and Morgan, the charity shop window is broken and Sasha takes the blame. Sasha then starts working at the shop to make up for it, and falls out with Kim. Kim treats her to dinner and sees that Sasha fancies Fatboy (Ricky Norwood). Kim then helps Sasha to find a work experience placement in a hospital, but is forced to reveal that she lied about knowing someone in forensics. However, she successfully gets Sasha a placement with Les Coker's (Roger Sloman) firm of funeral directors, and Sasha enjoys her first day there.

== Nico Papadopoulos ==
Nico Papadopoulos
- EastEnders character
- Portrayed by: Aykut Hilmi
- First appearance: Episode 4415; 24 April 2012
- Last appearance: Episode 4483; 21 August 2012
- Introduced by: Bryan Kirkwood
In-universe information
- Occupation: Fast-food restaurant manager
- Uncles: Andonis Papadopoulos

Nico Papadopoulos, played by Aykut Hilmi, is a worker at McKlunky's fast food restaurant, who Fatboy (Ricky Norwood) irritates after a night out. When Fatboy gets a job at McKlunky's the next day, Nico gives him his uniform, revealing himself to be the manager. Nico later arrives in The Queen Victoria public house, revealing that he is a friend of Fatboy's friend Dot Branning (June Brown) and the nephew of her boss, Andonis Papadopolous. Later, while Fatboy is working a day shift, Nico tells him he has to work the late shift, meaning he will miss his DJ gig. During the Diamond Jubilee of Elizabeth II, Fatboy lies to Nico to get off work, only for Nico to see Fatboy enjoying the festivities on television. Later, Nico calls the police when Lola Pearce (Danielle Harold) becomes aggressive with him, after he discovers that Fatboy has given her free food. Nico is later present at the birth of Lola's baby Lexi Pearce, which happens in the restaurant. Nico and Fatboy decide to use this to gain publicity for the restaurant, having Lola, Lexi and Lola's grandfather, Olympic Torch bearer Billy Mitchell (Perry Fenwick), appear with them in a photo for the local newspaper. On 7 August, Nico asks Fatboy for Lauren Branning's (Jacqueline Jossa) number, to which Fatboy agrees, even though Lauren calls Nico a fascist. On 9 August, McKlunky's enters the local cook-off, competing against other local food establishments. Nico makes Fatboy dress as a chicken, and is annoyed when they do not win. On 21 August, Nico sacks Fatboy when he stands up to him about being mistreated at work. This is his last appearance.

In Inside Soap magazine, Kate White said of Nico: "He may give Fat Boy a headache, but we have a crush on McKlunky's manager. He's not had the fanfare of Tyler (Tony Discipline) or Joey (David Witts), but he's the fittest fella on the Square right now!"

== Alice Branning ==
Alice Branning, played by Jasmyn Banks, is the daughter of Derek Branning (Jamie Foreman). The character and casting were announced on 14 April 2012. Alice made her first appearance on 10 May 2012. On 22 September 2013, it was announced that Banks would be written out of the show and will leave following the conclusion of Michael Moon's (Steve John Shepherd) exit storyline. Her last episode was on 24 December 2013.

== Joey Branning ==
Joey Branning, played by David Witts, is the estranged son and eldest child of Derek Branning (Jamie Foreman), and the brother of Alice Branning (Jasmyn Banks). He made his first appearance in the episode broadcast on 22 June. Witts quit his role in 2013 and left on 26 December 2013.

== Scarlett Butcher ==
Scarlett Butcher
- EastEnders character
- Portrayed by: Amelie (2012–2013); Tabitha Byron (2021–2023)
- Duration: 2012–2013, 2021–2023
- First appearance: Episode 4448/9; 22 June 2012
- Last appearance: Episode 6636; 26 January 2023
- Introduced by: Bryan Kirkwood (2012); Jon Sen (2021)
In-universe information
- Other names: Patricia Moon; Scarlett Moon
- Father: Michael Moon
- Mother: Janine Butcher
- Stepfather: Mick Carter
- Half-brothers: Tommy Moon
- Grandfathers: Eddie Moon; Frank Butcher
- Grandmothers: Maggie Moon; June Butcher
- Uncles: Ricky Butcher; Craig Moon; Anthony Moon; Tyler Moon
- Aunts: Clare Butcher; Diane Butcher
- First cousins: Liam Butcher; Tiffany Butcher; Jacques Butcher
- Other relatives: Alfie Moon; Bert Moon; Ernie Moon

Scarlett Butcher (also Moon) is the daughter of Janine Butcher (Charlie Brooks) and Michael Moon (Steve John Shepherd). She was played by Amelie until 2013 and Tabitha Byron from 2021 to 2023. She is born in the episode broadcast on 22 June 2012. Scarlett was written out of the series in late 2013, as part of Janine's upcoming exit storyline. On 14 June 2021, it was announced that Scarlett would be returning alongside Janine. The character returned on 27 August 2021 to tie in with Janine's return, and left on 26 January 2023, to tie in with Janine's fourth exit from the show.

Scarlett is 11 weeks premature via Caesarean section on her parents' wedding day and has no heartbeat, so is placed on a ventilator. Her condition stabilises and she is baptised, with Janine naming her Patricia, after her late stepmother, Pat Evans (Pam St Clement), but she starts to regret using the name Patricia and Michael registers the name Scarlett Patricia Moon. Concerned with Scarlett's deteriorating health, her parents organise a christening for her at the hospital with her uncle, Ricky Butcher (Sid Owen) and his stepdaughter Whitney Dean (Shona McGarty), as godparents. Janine and Michael bring Scarlett home on 7 August 2012 and Janine worries as there are no nurses to help her. On 14 September, Janine leaves Walford temporarily, leaving Scarlett in Michael's care.

It was reported in May 2012 that the character of Janine would go into labour on her wedding day to Michael, three months early. It was then reported in June 2012 that the baby would be named Scarlett Patricia Moon, after Janine initially decides to call her Patricia, after her former stepmother Pat Evans (Pam St Clement), who died earlier that year on 1 January. However, when she has second thoughts about the name, Michael registers the new name without telling her. A source from EastEnders said, "With a mother like Janine, this little girl is sure to be a fighter." Scarlett was portrayed by a prosthetic baby until the episode broadcast on 7 August 2012, when she was played by a real baby.

Eight years later, Scarlett reappears in London when she contacts her half-brother, Tommy Moon (Sonny Kendal) online.

== AJ Ahmed ==
AJ Ahmed, played by Phaldut Sharma, is the younger brother of established character Masood Ahmed (Nitin Ganatra). AJ made his first on-screen appearance on 9 July 2012. He left on 10 January 2014 to start a new job in Birmingham.

== Lexi Pearce ==
Lexi Pearce
- EastEnders character
- Portrayed by: Dotti-Beau Cotterill (2012–2015); Isabella Brown (2019–present)
- Duration: 2012–2015, 2019–present
- First appearance: Episode 4466; 23 July 2012
- Introduced by: Lorraine Newman (2012); Kate Oates (2019)
In-universe information
- Other names: Lexi Mitchell
- Family: Mitchell/Beale
- Father: Ben Mitchell
- Mother: Lola Pearce
- Adoptive father: Jay Brown
- Stepfather: Callum Highway
- Grandfathers: Phil Mitchell; Dan Pearce
- Grandmothers: Kathy Beale; Emma Harding
- Uncles: Ian Beale; Raymond Dawkins; Albie Watts; Dennis Rickman Jnr (adoptive)
- Aunts: Louise Mitchell; Donna Ludlow
- First cousins: Peter Beale; Lucy Beale; Bobby Beale; Peggy Taylor; Alyssa Lennox (adoptive)
- Other relatives: Stevie Mitchell; Billy Mitchell; Julie Perkins; Teddy Mitchell; Grant Mitchell; Sam Mitchell; Peggy Mitchell; Ronnie Mitchell; Roxy Mitchell; Danielle Jones; Courtney Mitchell; Harry Mitchell; Will Mitchell; Janet Mitchell; Amy Mitchell; Ricky Branning; Charli Slater

Lexi Pearce (also Mitchell), played by Isabella Brown, is the daughter of established characters Lola Pearce (Danielle Harold) and Ben Mitchell (Joshua Pascoe/Harry Reid/Max Bowden), who is born in the live segment of 23 July episode. From 2012 until July 2015, Lexi was portrayed by Dotti-Beau Cotterill. She was previously played by two babies. Her return in 2019, alongside Lola's, was announced on 20 December 2018. Isabella Brown's casting was announced on 19 March 2019. Lexi made her return alongside Lola and Ben on 1 April 2019.

Lexi is conceived during a one-night stand and Lola discovers she is pregnant in November 2011. Lola denies that Ben is the father and Abi Branning (Lorna Fitzgerald) breaks up with Jay Brown (Jamie Borthwick) when she thinks he is the father of Lola's baby. In April 2012, Lola discovers her baby is a girl.

During the live episode of 23 July 2012, Lola goes into labour whilst her grandfather Billy Mitchell (Perry Fenwick) is carrying the Olympic Flame through Walford. Aided by Cora Cross (Ann Mitchell), Jay, Ben, Patrick Trueman (Rudolph Walker), Fatboy (Ricky Norwood) and Nico Papadopalous (Aykut Hilmi), Lola gives birth to her daughter, with Billy making it just in time to witness the birth of his great-granddaughter. Lola brings the baby home and names her Lexi, after an old friend, which later transpires to be Alexa Smith (Saffron Coomber), with the middle name Billie, in honour of her grandfather. Lexi then wins a local "beautiful baby" competition.

Lola gets a new social worker, Trish Barnes (Tessa Churchard), who visits regularly, one time seeing paint on Lexi's feet and becomes concerned that Lexi could have an allergic reaction, and later worrying when Lexi develops a cough, so Trish decides to visit daily. When Lola is arrested for assault, Trish takes Lexi into care. In a desperate plea to save Lexi, Lola tells Ben's father, Phil Mitchell (Steve McFadden), that Ben is Lexi's father, following their one-night stand a year previously. Phil agrees to help get Lexi back, on the condition that Lexi lives with him. Lola eventually agrees and Lexi visits her 3 times a week. Lola is angered when Phil decides to tell Ben he is a father. Phil later wins custody of Lexi and is allowed to be her kinship foster carer and Lola's access is not increased, leaving her devastated. Phil organises a christening for Lexi on 1 January 2013, but Lola is angry to discover that he plans to name her "Mitchell" instead of "Pearce", however after a talk with Phil – Lola later agrees that they are all part of the Mitchell family, and agrees to change Lexi's last name to Mitchell. Lexi is baptised with Jay and Cora as godparents. Phil starts controlling Lola and Lexi's relationship and is determined to stop Lola from being reunited with her daughter. At a hearing to determine Lexi's future, his solicitor tells the court that Lola is an unfit mother, so her access is unchanged. Lola overhears Phil saying she will never get custody of Lexi, so she snatches her from Phil's house. They are eventually found, and the next day when Trish visits, Phil says he intends to help reunite Lexi and Lola, and Lola is then given increased access to Lexi. Phil later takes Lola and Lexi to prison to see Ben, so Lexi can meet her father, although Ben tells Lola to keep Lexi away from Phil. Lexi is later taken to the hospital after Lola suspects Lexi has meningitis, although she is relieved to discover that Lexi is fine. At the final court hearing, Phil says that Lola deserves her daughter and Lexi is returned to Lola.

In March 2014, Lexi is kidnapped by Adam White (Ben Wigzell), but her grandfather, Phil, and his cousin Ronnie Mitchell (Samantha Womack) get Lexi back to Lola, who is unaware that her daughter was the subject of a confrontation between Adam and Ronnie about the whereabouts of Carl White (Daniel Coonan), who was killed in the New Year by Ronnie. Lola worries that Ben might want involvement in Lexi's upbringing when she discovers that Ben will be returning to Walford for his father's wedding to Sharon Rickman (Letitia Dean). Ben informs Lola that she does not need to worry as he comments that she is a good mother to Lexi, who is in the right place to be brought up.

In July 2015, Lola and Jay begin a relationship and plan to leave Walford when Jay is wanted by the police. When Lola, Lexi and Jay try to leave, Jay is arrested by the police and Lola discovers that Billy was the one who reported Jay to try and stop Lola and Lexi leaving. Lola eventually convinces Billy that she does not want to live in Walford, so she and Lexi can have a better life. Billy and Lola share an emotional farewell and Lola leaves for Newcastle, taking Lexi with her. In October, Jay receives a call from Lola on his 21st birthday, ending her relationship with him and revealing she is now with Dexter Hartman (Khali Best), who is determined to provide Lexi with a stable upbringing. On 20 December 2018, it was announced that Harold would reprise the role of Lola, set to return in April 2019 with her daughter, Lexi.

== John Hewland ==
John Hewland
- EastEnders character
- Portrayed by: Jesse Birdsall
- First appearance: Episode 4476; 13 August 2012
- Last appearance: Episode 4477; 14 August 2012
- Introduced by: Lorraine Newman
In-universe information
- Sisters: Nina Hewland

John Hewland, played by Jesse Birdsall, is the fiancé of Sharon Rickman (Letitia Dean). He first appears on 13 August 2012, cast as part of a storyline to bring Sharon back to the series. A show insider called the storyline "dramatic" and said: "The scriptwriters have come up with a dramatic storyline that sees Sharon contact Phil (Steve McFadden) after she realises she doesn't want to marry her fiancé."

John first appears when Sharon returns to her wedding to collect her son Dennis Rickman (Harry Hickles) after walking out on John, but forgetting to collect Dennis. Dennis is with John and is fine, until John demands to know why Sharon is leaving him. She says she and Dennis are not happy, and he says she will regret going. Sharon realises Dennis is missing, and sees John driving off with him. She and Phil follow in their car, but lose them. They go to John's house where they force his sister Nina (Juliet Cowan) to reveal where she is meeting John with their passports. They get there but Nina warns him and he drives away. Another car chase ends when they get stuck in traffic and Dennis escapes from the car. John calls Sharon and Dennis scum, so Phil punches John. He is not seen again after this.

== Dennis Rickman Jnr ==
Dennis Rickman Jnr
- EastEnders character
- Portrayed by: Harry Hickles (2012–2015); Bleu Landau (2015–2020)
- Duration: 2012–2020
- First appearance: Episode 4476; 13 August 2012
- Last appearance: Episode 6089; 21 February 2020
- Introduced by: Lorraine Newman
In-universe information
- Other names: Denny Rickman; Dennis Rickman Jnr
- Occupation: Student
- Family: Watts/Mitchell
- Father: Dennis Rickman
- Mother: Sharon Watts
- Adoptive father: Phil Mitchell
- Half-brothers: Albie Watts; Ben Mitchell (adoptive); Raymond Dawkins (adoptive)
- Half-sisters: Louise Mitchell (adoptive)
- Daughters: Alyssa Lennox
- Grandfathers: Gavin Sullivan; Den Watts
- Grandmothers: Peggy Mitchell (adoptive); Angie Watts (adoptive)
- Aunts: Vicki Fowler

Dennis Rickman Jnr, portrayed by Harry Hickles from 2012 to 2015 and Bleu Landau from 2015 to 2020, is the son of Sharon Watts (Letitia Dean) and Dennis Rickman (Nigel Harman). Having believed that she was infertile, Sharon discovers that she is pregnant on Christmas Day 2005. Dennis is stabbed and killed in the early hours of New Year's Day 2006 and Sharon moves to Florida, where she gives birth to Dennis Jr. Born off-screen in 2006, he made his first appearance on 13 August 2012. The role was recast from Hickles to Landau in 2015; no specific explanation was provided for the decision to recast the role. As he aged, Dennis started to become more thuggish and even hits Sharon at one point. The character was killed-off during the soap's 35th anniversary celebrations, making his final appearance in the episode originally broadcast on 21 February 2020. Dennis is killed in a boat crash that was unintentionally caused by his adoptive father, Phil, after being locked in a room by Ian Beale. Ian attempted to save Dennis, but it was too late. The day Dennis died was the same day his younger brother, Albie Watts was born. Well over a year after his death, in November 2021, Dennis is revealed to be a father to a baby girl named Alyssa Lennox, having slept with Jada Lennox merely months before his death. The character's departure had not been publicised prior to broadcast. In November 2021, a baby is left on Sharon's doorstep and after several weeks, the baby's mother Jada Lennox (Kelsey Calladine-Smith) reveals that she had a one-night stand with Dennis while he was associated with drug dealing prior to his death, and that he is baby Alyssa's father, becoming a father at 13.

Kate White of Inside Soap opined that Dennis' nickname "Denny" is "the single most annoying thing in soap. If we hear Sharon shout it once more, we'll go mad!" After Landau's first appearance as Dennis, viewers reacted on social media website Twitter, saying that the "new Denny" looked nothing like the "old Denny". In August 2017, Landau was longlisted for Best Young Actor at the Inside Soap Awards. He did not progress to the viewer-voted shortlist.

== Pete ==
Pete
- EastEnders character
- Portrayed by: Jason Riddington
- Appears in: Episode 4491; 4 September 2012
- Introduced by: Lorraine Newman

Pete, played by Jason Riddington, appears on 4 September. He is first seen in the local nightclub R&R, where he flirts with Tanya Cross (Jo Joyner), Shirley Carter (Linda Henry) and Sharon Rickman (Letitia Dean). Shirley calls him desperate, and he tells her he has just been released from prison. Shirley then gets drunk with him, but when he grabs club manager Sharon's buttock, she tells him to leave. Pete then meets Shirley's ex-partner Phil Mitchell (Steve McFadden), and leaves with Shirley. He buys chips for her but when she says goodbye, he grabs her, so she kicks him. He grabs her by the face, so Phil punches him. Inside Soap called Pete "a dodgy guy". All About Soap called him "a creepy man", a "slimy stranger" and a "sleazy stalker".

== Jimmy Wicks ==
Jimmy Wicks
- EastEnders character
- Portrayed by: Ryan
- Appears on: Episode 4493; 7 September 2012
- Introduced by: Lorraine Newman
In-universe information
- Mother: Carly Wicks
- Grandmothers: Shirley Carter
- Uncles: Mick Carter; Dean Wicks; Jimbo Wicks
- First cousins: Frankie Carter; Lee Carter; Nancy Carter; Johnny Carter; Ollie Carter; Jade Masood
- Other relatives: Stan Carter; Sylvie Carter; Babe Smith; Tina Carter; Zsa Zsa Carter

Jimmy Wicks is the son of Carly Wicks (Kellie Shirley), born off screen in July 2012. He is portrayed by a baby named Ryan. Jimmy is named after Carly's dead brother James "Jimbo" Wicks (Lloyd Richards). He appears in the episode broadcast on 7 September when his mother introduces him to his grandmother Shirley Carter (Linda Henry). Shirley is instantly smitten with Jimmy and cries as she holds him for the first time. Carly and Jimmy leave Walford, taking Shirley to stay with them.

Kellie Shirley said that she was worried about dropping the baby while filming, but said it was "a really nice experience, especially as he was a really good baby." She confirmed that Ryan's mother was on set during filming so that he did not become frightened or confused, and the scenes were filmed quickly "because you can only film with a baby for a certain amount of time."

== Trish Barnes ==
Trish Barnes
- EastEnders character
- Portrayed by: Tessa Churchard
- Duration: 2012–2013, 2017
- First appearance: Episode 4499; 18 September 2012
- Last appearance: Episode 5451; 2 March 2017
- Introduced by: Lorraine Newman (2012); Sean O'Connor (2017)
In-universe information
- Occupation: Social worker

Trish Barnes, played by Tessa Churchard, is a social worker.

She is first seen when she visits Lola Pearce (Danielle Harold), but Lola is out buying nappies for her daughter Lexi Pearce, and her grandfather Billy Mitchell (Perry Fenwick) has the baby. Billy lies to Trish that he still has a job, even though he has recently lost it. Billy is also concerned when Lola returns with her friend Jay Brown (Jamie Borthwick), as he is on police bail for perverting the course of justice in relation to a murder. Trish comes back the next day with a list of concerns, and tells Lola she will be visiting more due to her bad attitude. Trish visits Lola again on several occasions, and sees paint on Lexi's feet, so tells Lola off as it could cause an allergic reaction, though it does not. Trish later worries when Lexi develops a cough. Trish finds out that Billy has lied about being employed, and then decides to visit daily as she feels he and Lola are not coping as she has used a tea towel as a nappy and the flat has not been cleaned. When Lola is arrested for assaulting Alexa Smith (Saffron Coomber), she is angry to see Trish arrive with the police. She bites Trish to stop her taking Lexi, but fails to stop her and is devastated when Trish takes Lexi from her. Lola decides to fight for Lexi and visits Trish at her office, apologising for biting her and asking when she can take Lexi home. Trish says she will have to attend parenting classes and have three access visits a week. Lola gets angry, so Trish says that her behaviour could cause her to lose Lexi for good. Trish brings Lexi to Lola again, but after Lexi leaves, Lola is devastated again, so Billy asks Lexi's grandfather Phil Mitchell (Steve McFadden) for help, and Phil decides to apply for a residency order for Lexi to live with him. Trish later arrives at Lola's, but without Lexi as she is ill. Trish is present when Phil decides to take Lexi to see his son, Lexi's father Ben Mitchell (Joshua Pascoe), who is in prison for murder, and Trish and Lola both refuse to let him. Phil asks Sharon Rickman (Letitia Dean) to pretend to be his fiancée to have a better chance of getting Lexi, and during a meeting between Trish, Phil and Lola, where Trish is assessing Phil, Sharon interrupts and introduces herself to Trish. When Alexa drops the assault charge, Lola thinks she will get Lexi back, but Trish informs her that the neglect case is still pending. Trish attends court where Phil is granted custody of Lexi, being her foster father, and Lola is allowed three access visits per week. When Lola learns that Phil wants to take Lexi on holiday for two weeks, Lola asks Trish's advice. Trish says that Lola is entitled to her access visits and can seek legal advice, however Lola agrees to let Phil go. When Phil returns, Trish informs him that she is pleased with Lola and she may get full custody of Lexi soon, leaving Phil unhappy. Trish attends a court hearing, stating Lola's positive progress and recommending that Lola has increased access to Lexi, but Phil has his solicitor tell the court that Lola turns up late and has a bad temper, so Lola's access does not change. Lola is angry and devastated, and Trish lends her support to Lola. After Phil and Lola sort their differences, Trish visits Phil and informs him that social services are preparing to increase Lola's visits to Lexi, with a view to returning Lexi to Lola in a couple of months. Checking on Lola's progress, Trish arrives unexpectedly and is invited to and attends a family dinner with Lola, Phil and Sharon. At the dinner, Sharon tells Trish that she and Phil are back together. At the court hearing, Trish is present when Lola is re-awarded custody of Lexi. She also visits Lola at home to see how she is coping. On another visit in August, Trish tells Lola she will cut back her visits to once a month as Lola is doing so well, and says soon she may not need to visit at all.

Five years later, Trish visits Denise Fox (Diane Parish), who is planning to have her baby adopted when it is born. She tells Trish that she does not want to spend any time with the baby. Trish visits Denise to inform her about how her son is doing with his potential adoptive parents. Trish and Denise both sign the paperwork for the adoption and Trish gives Denise a letter from the adoptive family, who have named the child Raymond.

=== Development ===
Churchard's official credits list her as having filmed a 10-episode recurring role in EastEnders, the first episode being on 18 September 2012. Speaking of the storyline involving Trish, Harold told Inside Soap that when Trish arrives at Lola's house, "everything goes wrong at once", and explained that "Trish isn't given a good impression of Lola as a mother, and Lola isn't impressed when she sees her taking pages of notes". Lola is not happy about Trish getting involved in her life with daughter Lexi. All About Soap described Trish as the "bossy new social worker".

=== Reception ===
The scenes where Trish takes Lexi from Lola were criticised by the charity The Who Cares? Trust on Twitter, who called the storyline an "unhelpful portrayal" and said it had already received calls from members of the public who were "distressed about the EastEnders scene where a social worker snatches a baby from its mother's arms". The scenes were also condemned by the British Association of Social Workers (BASW), calling the BBC "too lazy and arrogant" to get correctly portray the child protection process, and saying that the baby was taken "without sufficient grounds to do so". Bridget Robb, acting chief of the BASW, said the storyline provoked "real anger among a profession well used to a less than accurate public and media perception of their jobs". She stated:

It is disgraceful to see a publicly funded broadcaster deliberately spreading misinformation about the child protection process because it is too lazy and arrogant to get it right. We regularly give advice to programmes about social work storylines; we would like to know who advised EastEnders so badly. Social workers have a difficult enough job as it is. Unlike the writers and actors on EastEnders, they have to step through those front doors that no one else wants to step through, and they do it on a daily basis, to protect children, not to target families. EastEnders' shabby portrayal of an entire profession has made a tough job even tougher.

Another social worker said "Accurate procedures were not followed [when a character's baby was taken away]. Was it police protection, section 20? Where was the immediate risk to the baby? As a social worker, I was in tears, as was a colleague of mine, watching how our profession was portrayed on television." The BBC responded to BASW by saying:

• We understand you're unhappy with the current storyline concerning Lexi and Lola as you feel it portrays social workers inaccurately. We consulted with the programme's production team in writing our response and we'd like to assure you our intention is not to portray social workers in a negative light.
• Whilst the audience has seen how much Lola loves Lexi and how responsible she can be with her baby, we were careful to ensure that when the social worker was visiting, she generally saw only more worrying behaviour. Lola was often abrasive when speaking to the social worker and casual—sometimes even flippant in her responses to the social worker's suggestions.
• Given that Lola is a young mother, who has been, until this episode, wearing an electronic tag (for criminal damage to the car lot), with a history of getting into trouble with the police, and is known to have had a difficult childhood herself (indeed, three generations of the family have been through the care system), it was clearly important for social services to be involved with the family in order to ensure that Lola could cope with having a baby. In the last few weeks the social worker witnessed a series of unfortunate incidents, including Lexi wearing a tea-towel as a makeshift nappy, reports of Lola not taking Lexi to the mother and baby group, a messy and unclean flat, and the discovery that Billy had lied to her about having a job.
• Under the circumstances, we believe the audience will have understood why she had to act to remove Lexi quickly when the allegation of assault is made against Lola by Alexa. There was no suggestion that the social worker's actions were anything other than a genuine desire to protect Lexi, or that her concerns about Lola were unreasonable, given the picture she and the previous social worker had formed over a substantial period of time. There was certainly no inference that her actions were anything personal against Lola or her family.

A social worker who received the BBC's statement commented:

I don't think I need to spell out the ridiculousness of this response from the BBC and whether the grounds they claim, such as wearing a tea towel as a nappy, would constitute grounds for emergency removal in real life. I work in a long-term care team and take great offence at the suggestion that because Lola was in care there is an assumption that social services should be involved in her care of her child. Not that I am suggesting she doesn't need some support, but where is her aftercare worker? I am always disappointed at how social workers are portrayed in EastEnders, but this was the last resort. I do not agree that the public will think that this was reasonable and it just makes our job harder.

In November 2012, Irish politician Robert Troy expressed concerns that the storyline could influence the result of an upcoming referendum on children's rights. Troy said, "Quite a few times I have been asked about a storyline on EastEnders where a young mother has had her child taken into care and has faced a very difficult battle to get access to the child. People have been emotionally affected by the story and have a real concern about the sort of heavy-handed state intervention that's portrayed."

== Danny Pennant ==
Danny Pennant, played by Gary Lucy, made his first screen appearance on 27 September 2012, appearing until 2 November. On 6 March 2013, it was announced that Lucy was returning to the cast. Danny appeared on 7 June 2013 before becoming a regular character in July. On 19 January 2014, it was announced that Lucy would be leaving EastEnders. He left on 14 February 2014.

== Alexa Smith ==
Alexa Smith
- EastEnders character
- Portrayed by: Saffron Coomber
- Duration: 2012–2013
- First appearance: Episode 4506; 1 October 2012
- Last appearance: Episode 4600; 7 March 2013
- Introduced by: Lorraine Newman

Alexa Smith, played by Saffron Coomber, is a former friend of Lola Pearce (Danielle Harold). She appears in four episodes from 1 to 5 October 2012, two episodes on 13 and 15 November 2012 and one on 7 March 2013.

Alexa first appears when Lola sees her with a group of friends and recognises her from their time together in a care home. The next day, Lola meets Alexa and her friends, and Lola tries to impress them, keeping a look out while they shoplift. Later, they go to the local café where Alexa starts throwing things at people, including Lola's friend Abi Branning (Lorna Fitzgerald). Lola defends Abi, and Alexa says that she can only be friends with one of them, so Lola sides with Abi. Alexa is later shocked to discover Lola has a baby, and that Lola named her Lexi, after her. The next day, Lola sees Alexa and her gang, and Alexa insults Lexi, saying she should have had an abortion. When Abi arrives, Alexa mocks her for wearing makeup, wiping it from her face, and she and her friends start pushing and slapping Abi, filming everything on a mobile phone. They take Abi's phone, so Lola snatches it from Alexa. Alexa's friends grab Lola and when Alexa says that Lexi is dead, Lola breaks free and punches Alexa in the face, leaving her with a nosebleed. Alexa and her friends then show the police the part of their mobile phone video showing Lola attacking Alexa, and Lola is arrested, with Lexi being taken away by social services.

About six weeks later, Alexa and her gang return and attempt to bully Alice Branning (Jasmyn Banks) until her friend Ray Dixon (Chucky Venn) chases the gang away. The next day, Alexa and her friends see Lola and her friend Jay Mitchell (Jamie Borthwick) and taunt them about Lexi being in care. Lola tries to attack Alexa, but she is stopped by Jay and her grandfather Billy Mitchell (Perry Fenwick). Later, Billy sees Alexa alone and tells her he knows what it is like to be in care, as she does, and asks Alexa to give Lexi a chance to come home. Alexa is affected by Billy's words but when Lola arrives, she accuses Billy of witness tampering. However, Lexi's grandfather Phil Mitchell (Steve McFadden) learns from his lawyer that Alexa has dropped the assault charges against Lola. Three months later, Phil has custody of Lexi, but Lola snatches her after hearing Phil say she will never get Lexi back. Lola calls Alexa, having nobody else to turn to. Phil, Billy and Sharon Rickman (Letitia Dean) find Lola's phone and call Alexa, offering her money for information. They meet Alexa, who says Lola is in Tottenham, as she could not help Lola. Phil searches the squat that Alexa is staying in, but does not find Lola, though she is hiding in the house. She and Alexa talk, and Alexa says she ran away from her foster home. Alexa says Lola can stay the night while she parties with her friends, but Lola leaves when the police arrive.

Harold explained to Katy White from Inside Soap that Lola and Alexa were best friends when they were in a care home together, but when Alexa was fostered, Lola felt abandoned. She said that "in [a care home] environment, friends mean more than family", and is now happy to see Alexa. White said that Alexa and her friends are "very wild", meaning that "getting caught up with them is the last thing Lola needs." She explained that Lola's affection for her friend and her desire to fit in see her hanging out with them and putting up with their bad behaviour. Harold told All About Soap that while Lola has changed since they were in care, Alexa has not, and called the Alexa and her gang "scary", saying "They don't care about anyone but themselves […]. It's nasty." White described Alexa as "vicious" and "a very nasty piece of work." Digital Spy's Daniel Kilkelly called her "a boisterous girl".

== Lisa ==
Lisa, played by Marianne Benedict, appears on 1 October when Jack Branning (Scott Maslen) sets his brother Derek Branning (Jamie Foreman) up on a date with her. She is much taller than Derek, which makes everybody else laugh. Inside Soap found the scenes funny, saying "Sometimes the simplest jokes are the best. We loved pint-sized Derek's supersize date! Tee-hee!" Heat called it the "Awkward date of the week", commenting that "[it] looks like Derek needs to take a leaf out of Tom Cruise's book and get himself some man-heels, what with his date towering over him like that. He looks pretty smug, she looks pretty miserable. Should have stuck with the other brother, love."

== Jackie Bosch ==
Jackie Bosch
- EastEnders character
- Portrayed by: Frances Lima
- Appears in: Episode 4531; 13 November 2012
- Introduced by: Lorraine Newman

Jackie Bosch, played by Frances Lima, is a former girlfriend of Derek Branning (Jamie Foreman). She appears on 13 November 2012, when Derek's brother Max Branning (Jake Wood) decides to take Derek to visit the love of his life to cheer him up. Derek knew Jackie when she was 16 and is the only woman he has ever loved but she broke his heart. However, Jackie remembers Derek as a bully who beat up David Wicks (Michael French), and says their few dates were not a big love affair as Derek calls it. Derek leaves after Jackie says she was not surprised when she heard Derek had been in prison.

News of Jackie's appearance was first reported in October 2012, when photographs emerged from on-location filming, featuring actors Foreman and Jake Wood, who plays Derek's brother Max Branning, and two women, one of whom was Lima. At the time, no details of the characters were known. All About Soap and Inside Soap both speculated that they may have something to do with a secret Max is keeping from his fiancée Tanya Cross (Jo Joyner), but All About Soap noted that the house where filming took place was different from one seen in a previous episode where Max dropped off an envelope of cash, while Inside Soap said it was the same one. They also said that the women did not appear to be Max's usual type, but said Jackie (the older of the two women) did not seem happy to see them. When it emerged that Jackie was Derek's ex-girlfriend, and that Derek would be angry about the meeting and threaten to reveal Max's secret, Soaplife stated: "So [East]Enders specially casts Jackie, spends a packet on a location shoot so that Derek can get angry and mention the Max secret again? Hope the secret's better than this plot..."

== Ava Hartman ==
Ava Hartman, played by Clare Perkins, is the daughter of Cora Cross (Ann Mitchell) and half-sister of Tanya Cross (Jo Joyner) and Rainie Cross (Tanya Franks). Ava first appears on 20 November 2012. It was announced in September 2013 that Ava would be leaving the series at the end of her storylines with Sam James (Cornell S John), as was originally planned. She left on 17 December 2013.

== Tansy Meadow ==
Tansy Meadow
- EastEnders character
- Portrayed by: Daisy Wood-Davis
- Appears in: Episode 4535; 22 November 2012
- Introduced by: Lorraine Newman
- Spin-off appearances: "All I Want for Christmas" (2012)
In-universe information
- Sisters: Poppy Meadow

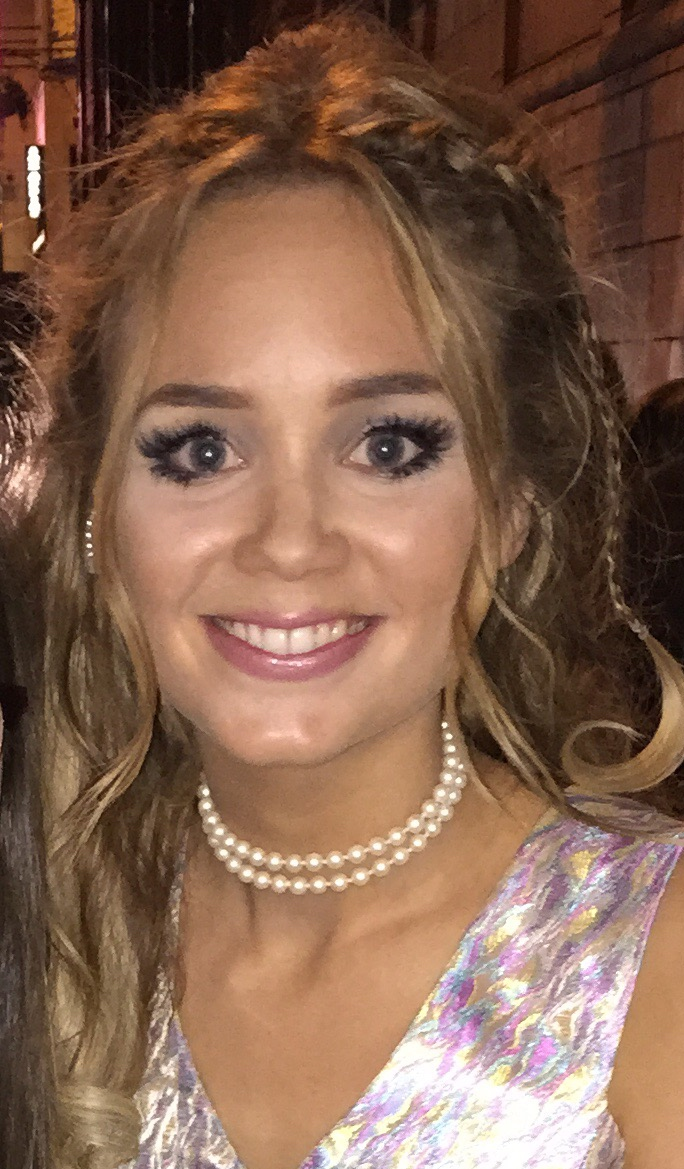
Actress Daisy Wood-Davis was introduced for one episode as Tansy Meadow.

Tansy Meadow, played by Daisy Wood-Davis, is the sister of Poppy Meadow (Rachel Bright). She appeared on 22 November 2012. Poppy receives a phone call from Tansy to say she is visiting the next day, and Poppy is unhappy about it. Poppy tells her friends that Tansy is successful and has a fiancé, and Poppy has lied to Tansy about her life. Poppy's friends Lucy Beale (Hetti Bywater) and Whitney Dean (Shona McGarty) refuse to pretend to be her employees at the salon, calling Poppy their boss, when in fact Poppy is employed there. Poppy calls Tansy to try to put her off, but Tansy arrives while Poppy is on the phone to her. Tansy shows off her engagement ring, so Fatboy (Ricky Norwood) pretends to be Poppy's successful banker boyfriend until Mo Harris (Laila Morse) reveals that Fatboy is a barman. Poppy apologises to Tansy for lying, and then Lucy and Whitney turn up pretending to be Poppy's employees, with an emergency at the salon. Later, Tansy cries as Poppy has everything perfect, and reveals she split from her fiancé three weeks ago because he cheated on her, and although she has worked out that Poppy does not own the salon, she thinks Poppy and Fatboy are good together. Poppy says they are just friends, but Tansy says that he clearly likes her a lot.

Tansy's arrival for a single episode was announced when it was revealed that Poppy was to become a regular character. Wood-Davis filmed her scenes in late August and early September. Inside Soap said of Tansy: "Super-successful Tansy is always bragging about her wonderful life and fiancé, so Poppy feels a bit of a failure in comparison." Tansy also appears in a 15-minute spin-off episode, called "All I Want for Christmas".

== Ayesha Rana ==
Ayesha Rana
- EastEnders character
- Portrayed by: Shivani Ghai
- Duration: 2012–2013
- First appearance: Episode 4549; 17 December 2012
- Last appearance: Episode 4596; 1 March 2013
- Introduced by: Lorraine Newman

Ayesha Rana, played by Shivani Ghai, is a family friend of Zainab Khan (Nina Wadia). She makes her first appearance in the episode broadcast on 17 December 2012. She was written out in early 2013 and left on 1 March 2013, after the departure of Zainab.

Ayesha is first seen in the café, where Zainab does not recognise her, and accuses her of pushing in the queue ahead of her. Later, Ayesha arrives at Zainab's home while Zainab is wearing a face mask. Zainab is annoyed that she was not ready for Ayesha's visit as she is three weeks early. Ayesha then overhears Zainab telling her son Tamwar Masood (Himesh Patel) that he would be better for her than her suitor, Rashid Kayani (Gurpreet Singh). Zainab tries to get Ayesha and Tamwar together, and she thinks it has worked at her New Year's Eve party, but Tamwar is just looking after Ayesha because she is sick after AJ Ahmed (Phaldut Sharma) spiked the punch. Ayesha then meets Rashid, and thinks he is "alright". However, she soon develops a crush on Masood, which he discovers and does not tell Zainab. He urges her to try with Rashid and she does meet him again. She thinks Rashid is not right for her and it is clear she still wants Masood. She lies to Zainab that she is still seeing Rashid, while telling Masood she loves him. He rejects her advances, and she later confesses her love of Masood to Zainab, saying he feels the same, and then leaves Walford. After Masood and Zainab break up and Zainab moves to Pakistan, Ayesha returns for Masood. She ruins his date with Carol and the next day they kiss. Masood attempts to move away with Ayesha but in the end he rejects her and she leaves alone. Tamwar sees she is back and thinks she is the reason Zainab left.

=== Development ===
Ayesha's arrival was teased by executive producer Lorraine Newman in an interview with Digital Spy when she said, "The Masoods are rightfully incredibly popular and we've got big plans for them. […] We also have a new female character joining the household in December. Let's just say that she's bound to cause a bit of mischief!" The character and casting were announced on 16 November, when Ayesha was described as "Sweet and studious, but rather shy", having lived a sheltered life. She is also described as a "naïve introvert". A BBC statement said of her storyline: "Since the tragic death of her beloved father, she has been left alone with a distant mother and uncaring brothers. Ayesha has agreed to fulfil her father's dying wish, going through with an arranged marriage. Can the Masoods help her? And will her time on [Albert] Square encourage this naive young woman to find her voice?" It was said that Ayesha would find living in Walford "a shock to the system, as she is used to grander surroundings." Shivani said of her casting: "I've been watching EastEnders for years and am excited to be joining such an iconic show." Details of Ayesha's arrival emerged on the day of her first episode, when it was revealed that Ayesha would be moving to Walford to get to know her suitor who lives in London, and that Ayesha would have a "shaky start" with Zainab, as she initially does not realise who Ayesha is.

== Adam White ==
Adam White
- EastEnders character
- Portrayed by: Ben Wigzell
- Duration: 2012–2014
- First appearance: Episode 4549; 17 December 2012
- Last appearance: Episode 4821; 17 March 2014
- Introduced by: Lorraine Newman (2012); Dominic Treadwell-Collins (2014)
In-universe information
- Mother: Nora White
- Brothers: Carl White

Adam White, played by Ben Wigzell, is Kirsty Branning's (Kierston Wareing) ex-boyfriend Carl White's (Daniel Coonan) brother.

Adam first appears when he is in a group of men who give Carl's former prison cellmate Derek Branning (Jamie Foreman) a beating after running his car off the road and chasing him. In February 2013, Kirsty's husband Max Branning (Jake Wood) goes to Adam's house to find Kirsty. Kirsty has a bruise on her neck, and realising Adam caused the injury, Max punches him. Adam and another man then beat Max after locking him inside the house. In May, Adam starts calling Kirsty, as Carl is due to be released from prison. Kirsty worries that they will track her down so Max returns with his brother Jack Branning (Scott Maslen) to confront Adam again. Adam punches Max so Jack throws him to the ground and the brothers order him to stop contacting Kirsty. In August 2013, Adam attacks Kirsty, asking her for money. Carl stops Adam, who did not know Carl would be there. Carl blames Adam for Kirsty marrying Max and their mother Nora White (Lynn Farleigh) being in a care home, and Adam explains he owes money to somebody. Carl and Adam go to nightclub R&R, where Carl plans to sell drugs but they are confronted by Max and club owner Phil Mitchell (Steve McFadden). Carl then disowns Adam and he leaves.

Adam returns in March 2014, in search for Carl, who has since been murdered by Ronnie Mitchell (Samantha Womack), alongside his mother, Nora (Lynn Farleigh). Ronnie lies to both of them about her identity, claiming to be her sister Roxy (Rita Simons), who had been Carl's girlfriend, and says she does not know where he went. However, Adam knows she is lying as Carl had sent Adam a photo of himself and Roxy together. Adam later kidnaps Lexi Pearce, which displeases his mother. Phil and Ronnie track them down, demanding Lexi back. The Whites demand to know what happened to Carl in return for the baby. When the Mitchells are hesitant to provide an explanation, Adam loses his patience but Phil warns him off harming Lexi and takes Lexi off Adam. Nora begs them for answers and Ronnie breaks down and admits that she killed Carl, leaving a distraught Nora and Adam shocked.

Ronnie and Phil return with Lexi, and give her back to her mother Lola (Danielle Harold) who is unaware of what has happened. Phil tells Ronnie she has to deal with Adam and Nora or he will. Ronnie then gets market inspector Aleks Shirovs (Kristian Kiehling) to attack Adam and beat him up. Ronnie takes Phil to visit Adam in hospital after Aleks's assault on him whilst Nora sits beside his bedside. Ronnie warns both Nora and Adam off hassling the Mitchells further, threatening them with more violence. Ronnie and a disturbed Phil then leave. Adam and Nora have not been seen since.

In Adam's first appearance, he is credited as "Thug", but his name was revealed in his second appearance. In August 2013, Heat said of Adam: "As if having bad boy Carl on the Square wasn't bad enough, now his brother Adam has popped up as well. And he's even more of a villain than Carl." Adam returned on 10 March 2014 and left on 17 March 2014.

== Kirsty Branning ==
Kirsty Branning
- EastEnders character
- Portrayed by: Kierston Wareing
- Duration: 2012–2014
- First appearance: Episode 4554/4555; 25 December 2012
- Last appearance: Episode 4782; 9 January 2014
- Introduced by: Lorraine Newman
In-universe information
- Occupation: Barmaid; Market trader assistant
- Family: Branning
- Husband: Max Branning (until 2014)
- Stepsons: Oscar Branning
- Stepdaughters: Lauren Branning; Abi Branning

Kirsty Branning, played by Kierston Wareing, is the third wife of Max Branning (Jake Wood) and the secret that Max has withheld from his former wife and current fiancée Tanya Cross (Jo Joyner) for several months. Kirsty's storylines include faking a pregnancy to stop Max leaving her, suffering a panic attack when Max nearly discovers her deceit, and her ex-fiancé Carl White (Daniel Coonan) trying to end her relationship with Max. In September 2013, it was announced that the character had been axed by new executive producer Dominic Treadwell-Collins, and Kirsty left on 9 January 2014.

=== Storylines ===
Kirsty unexpectedly arrives at Max's home on Christmas Day after his brother Derek Branning (Jamie Foreman) informs her of where he lives. Tanya answers the door and Kirsty introduces herself as Max's wife, moments before Max and Tanya are going to remarry. It is revealed that Max met Kirsty in 2011 after his split from Tanya, when he was living with Derek. Kirsty was working as an erotic dancer and was introduced to Max through Derek. They were both at a low ebb and Kirsty fell in love with Max, and they married. They planned to move to Manchester together but Max returned to Walford after hearing there was trouble there. Max learnt of Tanya's cervical cancer and stood by her, and left Kirsty behind. Unknown to Max, Kirsty was pregnant with his child. Derek stayed in contact with Kirsty, and Max sent money so she could divorce him. Derek did not give Kirsty the last payment, but lied to Max that Kirsty had signed divorce papers. Derek told Kirsty that Max did not want the child and she terminated the pregnancy. After this is revealed, a huge argument ensues after which Derek suffers a massive heart attack and dies. Kirsty stays in Walford and gets a job at the local public house, The Queen Victoria. On the day of Derek's funeral, Max and Derek's sister Carol Jackson (Lindsey Coulson) tells Kirsty that if she cannot find proof that Max loves her, then she must leave. When Kirsty meets Max, they argue but end up kissing passionately. Kirsty then attends the funeral, upsetting Tanya as Max has told her that Kirsty has left Walford. Tanya pays Kirsty to leave, but she does not go, so Tanya allows Kirsty to come to a family dinner to see what Max has with her. Kirsty revels in the fact that there are family problems. When Max's daughter Lauren Branning (Jacqueline Jossa) is upset, Kirsty takes the opportunity to bond with her, upsetting Tanya. Kirsty gives Lauren the keys to her room at the B&B. Max finds the keys and pockets them. Tanya finds them and assumes Max is still involved with Kirsty, so she goes to Kirsty's room and starts packing her belongings. Kirsty catches her, so Tanya tells Kirsty to leave, giving her the divorce papers to sign but Kirsty writes "never" on them. Lauren visits Kirsty and tells her to leave as Max will always want Tanya. Later, Kat Moon (Jessie Wallace) urges Kirsty to move on from Max, and as she realises how much she is hurting Max by staying, she signs the divorce papers. She tells Max she is leaving Walford. Tanya realises that Max still has feelings for Kirsty and ejects him from their home as Kirsty leaves Walford. Kirsty returns her wedding ring through the post. Max finds her staying with her ex-boyfriend Carl's brother, Adam White (Ben Wigzell), who is abusive towards her. After Adam beats Max up, Kirsty and Max reconcile with a passionate kiss in Max's car. She returns to Walford and lives with Max in the B&B.

Kirsty is angry when Max continues to say he has a special connection with Tanya because they have children. Kirsty tells Max she is pregnant, and Max says he is not ready to have a child with her. They agree that she will have an abortion, but she confides in Kat that she is not really pregnant, and Max then asks Kirsty to not abort the pregnancy. Kirsty then hopes she will get pregnant, and announces to her neighbours in the pub that she is pregnant. Max then finds himself and Kirsty their own home. Kirsty worries when people ask questions about her pregnancy, and Kat urges her to tell Max the truth. Adam starts calling Kirsty, as Carl is due to be released from prison. She also starts worrying when they will track her down. Kirsty cancels an ultrasound scan appointment but lies to Max that the hospital cancelled it. Max takes her anyway and Kirsty suffers a panic attack, so she does not have a scan. Kirsty is stunned to see that Carl has arrived in Walford. She tells him she is married and pregnant, and that he should leave. However, Carl insists he will win Kirsty back. Eventually Kirsty thinks she may be pregnant, so takes a pregnancy test but bins it when Max arrives. They argue about Carl and the bin is knocked over, so Max finds the test. She admits that she was never pregnant, so Max returns to Tanya, as he was only with Kirsty because of the pregnancy. Tanya, however, refuses to take him back, and leaves Walford. Max moves into his old house. While Max is away from Walford, Kirsty and Carl visit Carl's mother, Nora White (Lynn Farleigh), because she does not know they have split up. On Max's return, Carl lets Max think he is now with Kirsty. Max tells Kirsty he could not stop thinking about her while he was away, so she suggests that they meet later, and if Max does not arrive then their relationship is over for good. Carl discovers this, so makes sure Max is busy at work and visits Kirsty at the time Max was meant to be there. The next day, Carl implies to Max that he and Kirsty had sex. Max tells people about this. She is angered by what both Max and Carl have done and rejects them both. When she confronts Max again, they passionately kiss, but are interrupted by Lauren, who has been in a rehabilitation clinic. Kirsty then puts the relationship on hold for Lauren's sake. However, Lauren convinces them to reunite, as Max is lovesick. Carl continues to interfere in Kirsty and Max's marriage, and when Max is arrested for cutting the brakes of Carl's car, he ends his relationship with Kirsty and says he is guilty. Kirsty does not believe him, and suspects Carl forced Max into this position. In desperation for money, Kirsty has sex with Carl, and then steals £1000 from him. Max is then acquitted of the crime and reunites with Kirsty. However, Carl then tells Max that he had sex with Kirsty while he was in prison, and this leads to Max ending his relationship with her.

In the New Year, Kirsty becomes concerned when Carl is nowhere to be seen, unaware that he has actually been murdered by Ronnie Mitchell (Samantha Womack). She asks Phil Mitchell (Steve McFadden), Shirley Carter (Linda Henry) and Terry Spraggan (Terry Alderton) about Carl's whereabouts, but nobody knows where he is. When Jane Beale (Laurie Brett) reveals to Max that Tanya is in a new relationship, he takes Kirsty back. The reunion is short, however, when Kirsty makes the mistake of cooking the meal with wine, knowing that Max's daughter Lauren is an alcoholic. Max throws the meal at the wall and Kirsty is thrown out of the house. The next day, Kirsty is homeless and Max gives her £20 to live on, so she seeks advice from Shirley. At Denise Fox (Diane Parish) and Ian Beale's (Adam Woodyatt) engagement party, Kirsty acts drunk and tries to hug Max, stealing his car keys. Max and Lauren step outside to find Kirsty in Max's car. She insults Max and throws away her wedding ring and drives out of Walford.

=== Development ===
Wareing knew about the part of Kirsty in April 2012, and discovered she had the part in August at a meeting with executive producer Lorraine Newman and series consultant Simon Ashdown, who offered her the role. She started filming at the end of October, knowing her first episode would be on Christmas Day. She described her first scene as "really weird", "surreal" and "bizarre" because she had grown up watching EastEnders. The character was kept a secret, with no announcement being made, and the only people Wareing told she had the part were her father and brother. She found it more difficult over time to keep the secret, as for her, it was "exciting and nerve-wracking" and she wanted to share her news. She had to tell people who saw her arriving at BBC Elstree Centre that she was temping in the office or playing a background role.

Wareing said in an interview released after her first episode was broadcast, that she loves playing Kirsty, saying "there are a lot of places she can go, I feel." She said that Kirsty has "a lot of sides to her", meaning there are a lot of directions in which the character could be taken. She said that as not much is known about the character, "there is potential for a lot to come out about her." At first she thought Kirsty was "a bitch", but felt that eventually people may need another side to her and sympathise with her. She added that Kirsty is "far from boring". An official statement said "Kirsty is set to cause trouble for Max and Tanya. Will Max and Tanya's relationship survive, and will Kirsty want to give up her husband? One thing's for sure, Kirsty is fiery, flirty and does what she wants."

== Others ==
Character	Date(s)	Actor	Circumstances
Aaron	3–5 January (2 episodes)	Robert Curtis	Two brothers who meet Christian Clarke (John Partridge) and his sister Jane Beale (Laurie Brett) on a night out. Aaron remembers Christian from New Year's Eve, and when the four sit down to talk, Christian and Jane are bored as Aaron and Warren only talk about their business in doors and windows. Christian considers leaving but when his ex-boyfriend Syed Masood (Marc Elliott) enters, Christian flirts with Aaron, and they end up spending the night together.
Warren	3 January	Sean Browne	Two brothers who meet Christian Clarke (John Partridge) and his sister Jane Beale (Laurie Brett) on a night out. Aaron remembers Christian from New Year's Eve, and when the four sit down to talk, Christian and Jane are bored as Aaron and Warren only talk about their business in doors and windows. Christian considers leaving but when his ex-boyfriend Syed Masood (Marc Elliott) enters, Christian flirts with Aaron, and they end up spending the night together.
Miranda Powell	3 January	Victoria Pritchard	A marriage counsellor who Alfie Moon (Shane Richie) visits to talk about his relationship with his wife Kat Moon (Jessie Wallace), who does not come to the session.
Gerry	5 January	Paul Reynolds	A friend of Alfie Moon's (Shane Richie), who he pays to pretend to be a marriage counsellor for him and his wife Kat Moon (Jessie Wallace). Alfie tells Gerry to say he thinks there are no problems in their marriage, but when Gerry and Kat are left alone, Kat tells him that she believes Alfie no longer loves her and wants to end their marriage. Gerry wants to tell Alfie this but he thinks that Gerry had helped their marriage get back on track.
Sgt. Davis	12–13 January (2 episodes)	Brendan Fleming	A police officer who visits Derek Branning (Jamie Foreman) with a search warrant following a tip off that Derek has stolen goods in the house, however, the police find nothing.
Dr Hugh	16 January	Jessica Tomchak	A GP who Max Branning (Jake Wood) and Tanya Jessop (Jo Joyner) visit regarding their daughter Lauren Branning's (Jacqueline Jossa) drinking problems. Hugh uncovers that the source of Lauren's drinking may be recent stress at home.
Tristram Knight	6 February	Spencer Burrows	Mandy Salter's (Nicola Stapleton) wedding dress fitter, who is horrified when Lucy Beale (Hetti Bywater) purposefully throws coffee on the dress and claims she saw a mouse.
Sinclair	7 February	Colin Michael Carmichael	A man who goes on a date with Kim Fox (Tameka Empson). Sinclair tells Kim he is curious about her because she is black, and continues to make inappropriate comments regarding this, leading to Kim slapping him.
Rachel	9 February	Sarah Malin	Jack Branning's (Scott Maslen) lawyer in his custody battle against Roxy Mitchell (Rita Simons) for his daughter, Amy Mitchell (Amelie Conway). She is unimpressed when Roxy's brief, Jimmie Broome (Samuel James), brings up unsavoury events from Jack's past during the hearing.
DC Short	14 February	Matthew Burgess	A police officer, who, with his colleague, searches The Queen Victoria public house, suspecting that there is stolen cable hidden there. However, they find nothing.
Ali	20 February – 8 March (2 episodes)	Miren Patel	A man hired as a waiter by Afia Masood (Meryl Fernandes), but her husband Tamwar Masood (Himesh Patel) accuses her of finding Ali attractive, so tells him the job has already gone to someone else. Several weeks later, Tamwar is unhappy when Afia reveals she has hired him to help out at the restaurant. During his cover, Kim Fox (Tameka Empson) flirts with him and asks if he is married, causing him to threaten her with a wooden spoon and not allowing anybody to leave until she apologises. Eventually, Tamwar and Afia calm the situation down, and he explains that his wife as threatened to leave him. Afia speaks to her wife, who says it was just an argument and she will not leave him, and Tamwar apologises to Afia as he did not realise that Ali was married.
Andy	21–23 February (2 episodes)	Chris Reilly	An old friend of Derek Branning's (Jamie Foreman), who is given money by Derek to scare Roxy Mitchell (Rita Simons) into giving Jack Branning (Scott Maslen) custody over their daughter. He tells Derek that Roxy stole some alcohol he was expecting to be delivered, and Derek then pays him to send Roxy a message (implied to be that he wants her dead) to make sure Amy stays with the Brannings. However, when Andy visits Roxy, he hands over the money Derek gave him and says he does not want anything to do with the Mitchell family.
"Chrissy"	21 February	Uncredited	A girl who Derek Branning (Jamie Foreman) claims is his daughter, and takes his brother Jack Branning (Scott Maslen) to see her coming out of her school, to convince him to fight for his own child, Amy Mitchell (Amelie Conway). However, his brother Max Branning (Jake Wood) later tells Jack that Derek does not have a daughter and Derek admits he does not know the girl.
Jacqui Aspinall	5 March	Francine Morgan	Tanya Jessop's (Jo Joyner) nurse, who visits her to discuss her impending MRI scan. Tanya admits her insecurities about the effects her cervical cancer is having on her physical relationship, but is embarrassed when her mother, Cora Cross (Ann Mitchell) interrupts the pair.
Matt	5 March	Daniel Kendrick	A man who a drunken Lauren Branning (Jacqueline Jossa) knocks drink on during a night out. Later, he sees her passed out on the ground outside and comments that she could not handle her drink.
Annie	13 March	Uncredited	A woman who works at the local beauty salon, Booty, and rejects Roxy Mitchell (Rita Simons) for a haircut as she has nits.
Alex Foster	16–19 March (2 episodes)	Michael Vivian	Mandy Salter's (Nicola Stapleton) ex-boyfriend. He arrives in Walford looking for her and spots her going into a club. He later finds her in the local pub and tells her he will not leave without her. She says she will call the police and accuse him of groping her. Mandy later phones Alex as they witnessed Billy Mitchell (Perry Fenwick) on the night he is accused of murdering Heather Trott (Cheryl Fergison) and she knows that he could not have done it. Alex refuses to talk to the police, so Mandy does, and the police say they will contact Alex to confirm the information.
Gerry	20–21 March (2 episodes)	Michael Elliott	A tramp who Andrew Cotton (Ricky Grover) helps when he spots him sleeping in a toilet. Gerry later steals money given to Andrew by Dot Branning (June Brown) and when Andrew realises, Gerry runs away.
PC Shaw	21–26 March (2 episodes)	Daniel Millar	A police constable investigating the murder of Heather Trott (Cheryl Fergison). He is one of the first officers at the scene and calls for DS Crisp to investigate as there are signs of a burglary. After Andrew Cotton (Ricky Grover) suggests that his aunt, Dot Branning (June Brown), might know about his and Heather's plan to elope, Shaw visits Dot but she refuses to talk about it.
DC Swinton	21–22 March (2 episodes)	Laura Dalgleish	A police detective who appears at the scene of Heather Trott's (Cheryl Fergison) murder, and confirms that Heather is dead.
DS Luke Crisp	21 March – 20 August (12 episodes)	Rufus Wright	A police detective and a member of the homicide assessment team, investigating the murder of Heather Trott (Cheryl Fergison). He questions Phil Mitchell (Steve McFadden), Jay Mitchell (Jamie Borthwick), Billy Mitchell (Perry Fenwick), Ben Mitchell (Joshua Pascoe) and Shirley Carter (Linda Henry) about the incident and later concludes that the supposed burglary in her flat was faked. Later, he questions Andrew Cotton (Ricky Grover) and makes it clear that he knows about Andrew's past conviction for GBH. He then arrests Andrew on suspicion of murder and interviews him along with his colleague PC Shaw (Daniel Millar). Upon the discovery that a partly burnt hooded top was found, Crisp obtains one from the market stall that six of them were bought from, and then asks to see Jay's. Jay's has been burnt, but Phil replaces it with the one owned by Billy. Jay later visits Crisp at the police station and tells him he saw Andrew on the night of the murder and knows he is innocent. In April, he visits the crime scene when Shirley realises that a photo frame is missing and was probably the murder weapon. When Crisp is in the local pub, he sees Billy paying with a £50 note, which makes Crisp suspicious of Billy. After Heather's funeral, Crisp arrests Billy on suspicion of the murder, and then interviews him. When Shirley offers a reward for information about Heather's death, Crisp confronts her, telling her she is hindering his investigation by creating false leads. Crisp reappears in August when Ben confesses to Heather's murder. Crisp arrests Ben for the murder and interviews him. Ben is then charged and remanded into custody. Crisp informs Ben that Jay has been charged with perverting the course of justice and has been released on bail before telling Ben that he is on his own now. He then interviews Shirley and Roxy Mitchell (Rita Simons) about the day of Heather's murder.
DC Lythe	22 March	Tim Chipping	A police detective investigating the murder of Heather Trott (Cheryl Fergison).
Gemma Hopkins	26 March	Lynette Creane	A journalist who questions various Walford residents about the murder of Heather Trott (Cheryl Fergison), and overhears Billy Mitchell (Perry Fenwick) saying he is a key witness. Billy's story appears in the local newspaper the next day.
PC Lomax	27 March – 2 November (3 episodes)	Ayden Callaghan	A police officer who conducts a search of Andrew Cotton's (Ricky Grover) home to find a hooded top he was wearing on the night Heather Trott (Cheryl Fergison) was murdered. He also catches Dot Branning (June Brown), Rose Cotton (Polly Perkins) and Cora Cross (Ann Mitchell) breaking into the local nightclub where Andrew worked to find the hoodie. Lomax brings the women back to Walford and tells them that if they do it again they will be in trouble. In November, Lomax arrests Christian Clarke (John Partridge) for assaulting Danny Pennant (Gary Lucy).
Dave	2 April	Laurence Hobbs	A builder who is working for Jack Branning (Scott Maslen) on his boxing gym. Denise Fox (Diane Parish) sees him and asks him to work on her bed and breakfast, which needs rebuilding. Dave leaves Jack's job for Denise's, causing a rift between them.
Trevor	5 April	Mick Bartlett	A man involved in an alcohol-stealing scam with Derek Branning (Jamie Foreman), Alfie Moon (Shane Richie) and Billy Mitchell (Perry Fenwick). Trevor turns up late to meet Derek and Alfie, and tells them he was robbed at gunpoint. He later meets Alfie and Billy and it is revealed that they were double-crossing Derek.
Dr Curtis	10 April	Michael Elwyn	A psychiatrist working for the Crown Prosecution Service, who interviews Ben Mitchell (Joshua Pascoe) about lying to the police about his father Phil Mitchell's (Steve McFadden) involvement in the death of Stella Crawford (Sophie Thompson).
DC Damien McKenzie	13 April	Uncredited	A police officer who interviews Billy Mitchell (Perry Fenwick) following his arrest for murder, along with his colleague DS Crisp (Rufus Wright).
Miss Woods	17 April	Mercy Ojelade	Tiffany Butcher's (Maisie Smith) form tutor at school, who talks to her mother Bianca Butcher (Patsy Palmer) about how Tiffany is not doing well in her lessons.
James Real	26 April	John White	A man who comes to read Bianca Butcher's (Patsy Palmer) electricity meter. Bianca's mother Carol Jackson (Lindsey Coulson) lets him in, and he finds that Bianca is using an illegal meter key. Bianca says it was given to her by one of the electricity company's employees, but James says he will have to charge her £50, and replace the meter.
David Pitt	26–27 April (2 episodes)	Thomas Coombes	A man who visits Bianca Butcher (Patsy Palmer). She says she is Bianca's babysitter, and David says he will return the next day. He does return, and demands the full payment of a loan that day.
Mike	27 April	Paul Pariser	A man whose bag containing cash is stolen by Bianca Butcher (Patsy Palmer). He catches her, while the police are called.
Dan	7–8 May (2 episodes)	William Rodell	A man who meets Lauren Branning (Jacqueline Jossa) on a night out. She is drunk and kisses him as soon as she sees him. They then get into his car with several of his friends. Lauren's friend Lucy Beale (Hetti Bywater) eventually gets Lauren out of the car, but her handbag is left behind. Dan arrives in Walford the next day to return Lauren's handbag and, after falling out with her parents, Lauren gets in his car again. They drink vodka together but when Dan repeatedly tries to kiss her, Lauren becomes worried and runs away.
DS Bourne	14–15 May (2 episodes)	Mark Leadbetter	A detective who confronts Derek Branning (Jamie Foreman) with a search warrant to look for stolen alcohol. After searching Derek's home, nothing is found.
PC Teresa Ndiaye	14 May 2012– 7 September 2017 (7 episodes)	Amelia Donkor	A police officer who accompanies DS Bourne when he searches Derek Branning's (Jamie Foreman) house for stolen alcohol. She intervenes in an argument between Phil Mitchell (Steve McFadden) and Shirley Carter (Linda Henry) which threatens to get heated. She then leaves with Bourne when no booze is found. On Boxing Day, she questions Carol Jackson (Lindsey Coulson), Jack Branning (Scott Maslen) and Max Branning (Jake Wood) after Derek, their brother, dies of a heart attack. On Boxing Day 2015, she arrests Ian Beale (Adam Woodyatt) for dangerous driving after he covers for Phil after a road accident. In September 2017, Ndiaye is present when a demonstration is held against council cutbacks during the Walford in Bloom competition, attended by the mayor and several local dignitaries, and she tries to hold the demonstrators back. A gas explosion then occurs, injuring several people and Ndiaye helps with the rescue attempts.
Frank Hawkins	17 May	Mark Straker	A man from Walford Borough Council, who tells Kim Fox (Tameka Empson) that the name of her bed and breakfast, "Kim's Olympic Palace", is a copyright infringement.
Beryl Barr	18 May 2012– 10 October 2014 (2 episodes)	Maxine Evans	A woman who gives Janine Butcher (Charlie Brooks) a 4D baby scan. In 2014, she gives a scan to Ronnie Mitchell (Samantha Womack). She tells Ronnie and Charlie Cotton (Declan Bennett) that they are expecting a boy.
Trevor Brains	31 May	Daniel Coll	A journalist who attends the reopening of Kim Fox's (Tameka Empson) bed and breakfast, where he tries to persuade Andrew Cotton (Ricky Grover) to do an interview about his perspective of Heather Trott's (Cheryl Fergison) murder. Andrew refuses and Trevor leaves.
Dr Antonia Moyles	19 June	Pandora Clifford	A doctor who sees to a pregnant Janine Butcher (Charlie Brooks) after she collapses in pain. Dr Moyles diagnoses a urinary tract infection, but advises Janine to postpone her wedding as it is causing stress.
Nurse Annabel	25 June 2012– 27 February 2015 (8 episodes)	Lisa Greenwood	A nurse who cares for Scarlett Moon after she is born 11 weeks premature. She later leads a first aid course, attended by Scarlett's parents Michael Moon (Steve John Shepherd) and Janine Butcher (Charlie Brooks), and asks Janine to leave when another baby becomes ill. She is seen again when Michael attempts to visit Scarlett in hospital on her first birthday and he accuses Annabel of sneaking Janine and Scarlett into the hospital behind his back when they don't turn up for their appointment. In 2015, she appears at the hospital when Kim Fox (Tameka Empson) and Denise Fox (Diane Parish) visit Kim's newborn daughter Pearl in the neo-natal unit. Denise later asks her for an update on Pearl's condition but Annabel is unable to give her any further details. She offers to ask a consultant to answer Denise's queries. She later informs Kim that Pearl is making good progress.
Terry Willis	29 June	Tristram Wymark	The regional manager of the Minute Mart shop who visits the Walford branch where Denise Fox (Diane Parish) and Zainab Khan (Nina Wadia) work.
Sara Ellis Sakeena Ahmed DC Nick Crane Charlie Bearman	29 June	All uncredited	Colleagues of Lola Pearce's (Danielle Harold) social worker, Helen Roberts (Martine Brown), who attend a meeting along with Lola and her grandfather Billy Mitchell (Perry Fenwick). They are social worker Sara Ellis, Sakeena Ahmed from Walford General Midwifery Team, DC Nick Crane, a special case worker from Walford police, and Charlie Bearman, who chairs the meeting.
Viv Martinez	4 July	Kim Tiddy	The manager of The Queen Victoria's rival football team, the Old Lions. Viv's team win, and they return to The Queen Victoria, where Kat Moon (Jessie Wallace) is landlady and manager of their team. Viv tries to steal chef Ray Dixon (Chucky Venn) for her pub, and then badmouths Kat, so Derek Branning (Jamie Foreman) escorts her out of the building. As she leaves, Viv remarks that Derek has clearly taken a shine to Kat. Ray keeps in contact with Viv, and attempts to play for both her team and The Queen Victoria's.
Frankie	5 July	Frank Keogh	A young man who pesters Lucy Beale (Hetti Bywater) and ends up being punched by Joey Branning (David Witts).
Jed Quinn	5 July	Harry Macqueen	A manager for the Minute Mart chain of local shops, who visits Denise Fox (Diane Parish) and Zainab Khan (Nina Wadia) after their shop wins best in East and South London.
Doug	10 July	Ged Forrest	A man who buys Ben Mitchell (Joshua Pascoe) and Jay Mitchell's (Jamie Borthwick) stock car after seeing it race.
Hannah	12–19 July (4 episodes)	Leila Crerar	A couple whose child, Jake, is in the same hospital as Janine Butcher (Charlie Brooks) and Michael Moon's (Steve John Shepherd) baby Scarlett Moon, who is on a respirator. Jake appears to be improving, but then becomes ill and is taken off the ward.
Rob	12–19 July (4 episodes)	Thomas Snowdon	A couple whose child, Jake, is in the same hospital as Janine Butcher (Charlie Brooks) and Michael Moon's (Steve John Shepherd) baby Scarlett Moon, who is on a respirator. Jake appears to be improving, but then becomes ill and is taken off the ward.
Joy	17–23 July (2 episodes)	Carolyn Jones	The widow of an old friend of Patrick Trueman (Rudolph Walker). Patrick attends his wake along with Cora Cross (Ann Mitchell) and Rose Cotton (Polly Perkins), and Anthony (Matt Lapinskas) and Tyler Moon (Tony Discipline) also attend, with funeral director Les Coker (Roger Sloman), as Cora wants the deceased's belongings for her charity shop and the Moon brothers want them for their business. Joy dislikes Patrick, so Cora pretends to be his wife so Joy changes her mind about him. However, Rose reveals they are not really married. Eventually, Cora and Anthony decide to split the items between them. Joy later visits Anthony and Tyler, who reveal that Cora does not live with Patrick, so Joy accuses Cora of being a "grave robber". However, Cora kisses Patrick to prove they are in a relationship, and Cora says that Joy has been listening to lies.
Stuart	23 July	Justin Brett	A man who is looking for Ian Beale (Adam Woodyatt). Ian's daughter Lucy Beale (Hetti Bywater) assumes he is from social services, but when Tanya Jessop (Jo Joyner) comes to help Lucy, it emerges that he is a debt collector, and says he will be back in a few days for money.
Sarah Brown	30 July – 21 September (2 episodes)	Amanda Daniels	When Lola Pearce (Danielle Harold) is sentenced to community service, Sarah leads a group, which includes Shaiyana (Dani Moseley). They set about picking litter from the streets of Walford. Sarah refuses to allow Lola to see her newborn daughter Lexi, and takes away her mobile phone. Lola's grandfather Billy Mitchell (Perry Fenwick) later brings Lexi out, but Sarah refuses to let Lola see her. In September, Sarah is present while Lola works at the local charity shop on her last day of community service. Sarah does not believe Lola should have brought her daughter Lexi, and tells her off for messing around and arguing with Abi Branning (Lorna Fitzgerald).
Shaiyana	30 July	Dani Moseley	A member of a group taking part in community service, led by Sarah Brown (Amanda Daniels), which includes Lola Pearce (Danielle Harold). They set about picking litter from the streets of Walford. Shaiyana thinks it is unfair when Sarah refuses to allow Lola to see her newborn daughter Lexi, and takes away her mobile phone, so Shaiyana lends her phone to Lola.
Fran	31 July	Imogen Slaughter	A woman in charge of a homeless drop in at the local community centre, where Lauren Branning (Jacqueline Jossa) and Whitney Dean (Shona McGarty) volunteer in exchange for concert tickets.
Betty	2 August	Kirstie Brough	A homeless girl. When Max Branning (Jake Wood), Tanya Jessop (Jo Joyner) and Alfie Moon (Shane Richie) go looking for Ian Beale (Adam Woodyatt) at a homeless shelter where Lauren Branning (Jacqueline Jossa) saw him, Betty tells them she recognises Ian from a photo. Max pays her £30 to take them to a place he may be. Another person there says they have seen him, so Max pays Betty a further £20 to take them. When they get there, Betty tries to run away but Max stops her and accuses her of lying. However, Tanya then finds Ian.
Nina Hewland	13–14 August (2 episodes)	Juliet Cowan	Sharon Rickman's (Letitia Dean) bridesmaid, and sister of her fiancé John Hewland (Jesse Birdsall). After Sharon jilts John, she leaves her son Dennis (Harry Hickles) behind, and returns with old friend Phil Mitchell (Steve McFadden) to collect him. After Sharon and John talk, John and Nina drive away with Dennis as revenge. Sharon and Phil chase after John and Nina to get him. They lose them but go to John's home, where they find Nina, and get her to talk to John on the phone, revealing where they are meeting them. They turn up but Nina shouts to John to go, and another car chase ensues. Eventually, they get stuck in traffic and Dennis escapes and is reunited with Sharon. Phil punches John and Nina tends to him.
Mike Sommers	17 August	David Warwick	A duty solicitor who advises Ben Mitchell (Joshua Pascoe) after he confesses to murdering Heather Trott (Cheryl Fergison). Ben is not believed by DCI Jill Marsden (Sophie Stanton) but is arrested by DS Luke Crisp (Rufus Wright). Ben then gets his friend Jay Mitchell (Jamie Borthwick) to back up his story by getting Mike to pass a note to Jay's solicitor.
Mary Smith	17 August	Uncredited	The appropriate adult when Ben Mitchell (Joshua Pascoe) confesses to and is arrested for murdering Heather Trott (Cheryl Fergison). Not to be confused with original character Mary Smith (Linda Davidson).
Lester Rodney	17 August	Richard Betts	Lucy Beale's (Hetti Bywater) solicitor when she gets her father Ian Beale (Adam Woodyatt) to sign all of his businesses and properties over to her.
Andy	21 August	Reece Beaumont	A colleague of Fatboy (Ricky Norwood) at the local fast-food restaurant, who works for Nico Papadopoulos (Aykut Hilmi). Fatboy gets Andy to back him up when he confronts Nico about being mistreated at work. This leads to Fatboy losing his job.
Aliyah Ahmed	31 August	Ann Wenn	AJ Ahmed's (Phaldut Sharma) wife. She arrives at AJ's brother Masood Ahmed's (Nitin Ganatra) house after Masood's wife Zainab Khan (Nina Wadia) calls her so she and AJ can sort out their marriage. However, Aliyah only wants to drop off AJ's belongings, and reveals that she did not have an affair as AJ had previously said, but AJ and Aliyah split because she wants children and he does not.
Bethan Hickey	3 September	Uncredited	A woman from a fine café blog, who meets Lucy Beale (Hetti Bywater), owner of the local café "Cindy's". Lucy is forced to close the café to meet Bethan, but when they arrive back at the café, Lucy is surprised and relieved to discover that Cora Cross (Ann Mitchell) and Patrick Trueman (Rudolph Walker) are running it, as Lucy left her keys in the door.
Graham Avens	10–17 September (2 episodes)	Ian Conningham	A social worker who visits Lola Pearce (Danielle Harold) and her baby Lexi without warning. Jay Mitchell (Jamie Borthwick), who is on bail for perverting the course of justice, hides in the room so Graham cannot see him. Graham later visits again to let Lola know that there will be a new caseworking coming the next day.
PC Arnold	11 September 2012, 26 March 2013, 2 April 2015 (3 episodes)	Grant Burgin	A police officer who stops Ray Dixon (Chucky Venn) and asks to search him as he suspects him of a mugging. Ray is angry and accuses Arnold of being racist. In March 2013, Bianca Butcher (Patsy Palmer) reports her son Liam Butcher (James Forde) missing to Arnold, who tells Bianca that as Liam has gone of his own free will there is nothing the police can do, but when Bianca reveals that there are criminal matters involved, Arnold passes the case on to his colleague DC Booth (Sanchia McCormack). In April 2015, Arnold escorts Ben Mitchell (Harry Reid) home after discovering him naked and abandoned in the middle of the M11 motorway.
Dave	17–21 September (2 episodes)	John Burton	A man who Syed Masood (Marc Elliott) owes money to for the sale of some cleaning goods. Syed has been unable to sell them on, and Dave asks him to pay by the end of the week. Syed later calls Dave, leaving him a message to say that he cannot pay. Dave then visits Syed at his brother Tamwar Masood's (Himesh Patel) restaurant, and Syed pays the debt, forging a cheque with Tamwar's signature.
Matthew	17 September	William Findley	A man who delivers a notice to Billy Mitchell (Perry Fenwick) from Janine Butcher (Charlie Brooks), for her husband Michael Moon (Steve John Shepherd), to say that she is closing her property management business, Butcher's Joints.
Jenny Gunn	25–28 September (2 episodes)	Marnie Baxter	A private investigator hired by Michael Moon (Steve John Shepherd) to try to trace his wife Janine Butcher (Charlie Brooks). She later informs Michael that Janine has left the country.
Caroline	25 September 2012 – 8 January 2013 (2 episodes)	Charlotte Allam	A health worker at the community centre who tells Michael Moon (Steve John Shepherd) he needs to buy bigger nappies for his daughter Scarlett Moon. In January 2013, she is present when Michael and Phil Mitchell (Steve McFadden) bring Scarlett and Lexi Pearce to the community centre.
Samina Anwar	25 September	Sheena Bhattessa	Lola Pearce's (Danielle Harold) new youth offender officer.
Parvez	25 September	Uncredited	The new chef at the Argee Bhajee restaurant.
Adam Beecroft	27 September	Kevin McGowan	A debt collector who visits Tamwar Masood (Himesh Patel) as he has missed three payments on his mortgage for his restaurant. Tamwar's older brother Syed Masood (Marc Elliott) pretends to be Tamwar, and tells Tamwar that Adam is there to talk about advertising. When Adam returns later, he gives Syed ten days to pay £9000.
Coach Roberts	28 September	Grant Davis	A boxing coach who Jack Branning (Scott Maslen) wants to work at his gym. He had previously appeared in the first series of EastEnders: E20 in 2010.
Chantelle	1–5 October (4 episodes)	Kelsey Hardwick	A girl who approaches Lola Pearce (Danielle Harold), Abi Branning (Lorna Fitzgerald) and Jay Mitchell (Jamie Borthwick) to say that her friend fancies Jay. Lola tells her that Jay has higher standards than Chantelle's friend. Lola later sees that her old friend Alexa Smith (Saffron Coomber) is one of Chantelle's friends. The next day Alexa introduces Lola to Chantelle and her other friends and they shoplift. They go to the local café, where Chantelle asks Lola about her electronic tag and offers her alcohol. Lola declines and when she tries to leave, Chantelle, Alexa and their friends try to convince Lola to stay. The gang pick on Abi, so Lola takes Abi's side. They then threaten Lola and Lexi. Later, the gang attack Abi and film it, which leads to Lola attacking Alexa and being arrested.
Keith	1 October	Charles Armstrong	A man who Ray Dixon (Chucky Venn) has a meeting with to secure funding for a project he is planning to help children who are discriminated against.
Gillian	2 October	Sharon Cherry Ballard	A woman who runs a mother and baby class, which Lola Pearce (Danielle Harold) attends without her baby Lexi. Gillian says she will have to inform social services.
Emily	4 October	Amy Loughton	A woman who Michael Moon (Steve John Shepherd) wants to hire as an au pair for his daughter Scarlett. Emily decides not to take up the job.
Michelle	5 October	Kim Barry	The woman who removes Lola Pearce's (Danielle Harold) ankle tag when her curfew ends.
Marcus	15 October	Jonathan Taylor	A man who gives unwanted attention to Denise Fox (Diane Parish) during a party in The Queen Victoria public house. Fatboy (Ricky Norwood) intervenes so Marcus punches him and throws a drink over Denise before leaving.
Suzanne Parker	16 October 2012– 4 November 2016 (4 episodes)	Beatrice Curnew	The registrar who performs Syed Masood (Marc Elliott) and Christian Clarke's (John Partridge) civil partnership ceremony. In September 2014, she marries Phil Mitchell (Steve McFadden) and Sharon Rickman (Letitia Dean). In May 2016, she marries Martin Fowler (James Bye) and Stacey Branning (Lacey Turner). In November 2016, she marries Lee Carter (Danny-Boy Hatchard) and Whitney Dean (Shona McGarty).
Olivia	25 October	Samantha Best	Rainie Cross' (Tanya Franks) addiction sponsor. Olivia meets Rainie's mother Cora Cross (Ann Mitchell) when Cora has arranged to meet Rainie, and gives Cora a letter from Rainie. Cora refuses to finish reading the letter and Olivia tells her that she triggers Rainie's bad behaviour, and does not want further contact with her.
Preeti, Dani, Sophie and Dani	5 November	Uncredited	Four friends of AJ Ahmed (Phaldut Sharma) who he gets to dance at his fireworks display.
Rick Gekowski	6 November	Laurence Saunders	A Fostering Assessment Social Worker who visits Phil Mitchell (Steve McFadden) and Sharon Rickman (Letitia Dean) as they plan to foster Phil's granddaughter Lexi Pearce. They are pretending to be in a relationship, and convince Rick that they are a happy couple after he questions them about their families. Later, Sharon's real boyfriend Jack Branning (Scott Maslen) sees Rick in the pub and knows him from his previous work in the police. He asks Jack about Sharon and Phil and is annoyed when Rick says they seem well suited.
Matthew Grindlay	8 November	James Bradshaw	An Environmental Health Officer who visits Kim Fox's (Tameka Empson) bed and breakfast after a customer complains that there were mouse droppings on their plate. Kim tells Matthew she got the breakfasts from the café, but after he finds no problems there, he says the B&B must be the problem. He asks Kim about her food standards and then shuts down the kitchen when a mouse is caught in a trap.
Mr Parr	13 November	Dominic Kemp	Cora Cross' (Ann Mitchell) area supervisor at the charity shop. Cora is accused by Mr Lister (Nick Wilton) of stealing a bag that he donated. Mr Parr finds the bag in a back room with a bottle of rum in it, so sacks Cora.
Sylvia	19 November	Uncredited	A girl who works at the local chemist, who Fatboy (Ricky Norwood) likes. Fatboy's friend Poppy Meadow (Rachel Bright) gives him advice for asking her on a date, and when he sees her at The Queen Victoria public house, he does so, and they drink together. They exchange telephone numbers, but the next day, Sylvia rejects Fatboy.
Jayden	20 November	Cedric Essumang	A student at the school where Ava Hartman (Clare Perkins) works. Ava reprimands him for being out of the classroom.
John Edwards	22 November	Uncredited	A man from Walford Council who meets Ray Dixon (Chucky Venn) at the launch of his youth mentoring scheme.
Dave	6 December	Luke Hamill	A Fostering Assessment Social Worker who is covering for Rick Gekowski (Laurence Saunders). He visits Phil Mitchell (Steve McFadden) and Sharon Rickman (Letitia Dean), who are trying to foster Lexi Pearce. Phil tells Dave that his and Sharon's relationship is over, though it was a fake relationship anyway. Dave says they will have to be reassessed.
Jenni Stewart	10 December	Claire Carrie	Lola Pearce's (Danielle Harold) new social worker, who visits her and her and her daughter Lexi Pearce's grandfather Phil Mitchell (Steve McFadden). Lola says she will prove she is the best mother for Lexi.
Judge Mavis Pritchard	13 December	Veronica Roberts	The judge deciding if Phil Mitchell (Steve McFadden) should be the foster carer of Lola Pearce's (Danielle Harold) daughter and his granddaughter Lexi Pearce. Pritchard decides that Phil should foster Lexi and that Lola should have three access visits per week.
Stella	18 December	Danielle Meehan	A stripper hired to perform at Max Branning's (Jake Wood) stag party.
Fred	25 December	Michael O'Connor	The registrar who arrives to marry Max Branning (Jake Wood) and Tanya Cross (Jo Joyner). However, the wedding does not go ahead.
Mr Passmore	27 December	Leigh Jones	A man whose car is being repaired at the local garage, telling mechanic AJ Ahmed (Phaldut Sharma) to fix it promptly. When he arrives to collect the car, Zainab Khan (Nina Wadia) is there with AJ, and the car is not ready. Zainab finds a pair of woman's knickers in the car, threatens to call Mr Passmore's wife about them, tells him the car will be ready the next day and says he will not be rude next time.
