= Ava Alexander =

Ava Alexander may refer to:

- Eva Alexander (born 1976), pronounced Ava, TV presenter
- Ava Alexander, character in Up All Night (TV series)
