= Saffron Coomber =

English actress

- Born: 15 November 1994 (age 31); Greenwich, London, England
- Education: Blackheath High School, Royal Academy of Dramatic Art
- Occupation: Actress
- Years active: 2003–present

Saffron Marni Coomber (born 15 November 1994) is an English actress, best known for her role as Sapphire Fox in Tracy Beaker Returns from 2010 to 2012. She also portrayed Alexa Smith in EastEnders from 2012 to 2013. In 2023, she starred in the ITV drama Three Little Birds.

== Early and personal life ==
Coomber was born on 15 November 1994 in Greenwich, London, to an English father and mother of Jamaican descent. She attended Blackheath High School and Theatre Street Performing Arts. She has a sister named Saskia, who is also an actress. Coomber also trained at the Royal Academy of Dramatic Art.

== Career ==
=== Television ===
In 2003, Coomber provided the voice for the PlayStation 2 video game, EyeToy: Play. She began her acting career in 2008 when she starred in the television movie adaptation of Jacqueline Wilson's Dustbin Baby as Cathy. She also played Molly in three-part children's drama Runaway in 2009, as well as guest roles in The Bill and Doctors.

In 2010, Coomber began playing the role of Sapphire Fox in the CBBC children's television series Tracy Beaker Returns. Sapphire was introduced as the care homes' eldest resident in the first series and was interested in art. Her character also often acted as a sister figure to many of the other residents. In the third series, Sapphire's storylines revolved around her moving out of The Dumping Ground and into her own flat, she made her final appearance in the last episode of Tracy Beaker Returns in 2012. She also appeared in the spin-off series, Tracy Beaker Survival Files. Coomber reprised her role of Sapphire in 2015 for the spin-off cooking series The Dumping Ground Dish Up.

In 2012, Coomber appeared in an episode of Holby City as Lauren Earnshaw, before joining the cast of EastEnders as Alexa Smith, an old friend of Lola Pearce (Danielle Harold) who Lola named her daughter Lexi after. Alexa and Lola were in care together and Alexa initially appears to rekindle her friendship with Lola, however soon changes her mind as she believes Lola and her friend Abi Branning (Lorna Fitzgerald) are stuck up, starting a fight with them, which Alexa records and results in Lola's daughter being taken away by social services, however she later returns to and gives Lola a place to stay when she runs away with her daughter. In 2013, she played a Box Office Girl in Youngers. In 2014, Coomber played Rachel in the short film Electricity. In 2015, Coomber appeared in 3 episodes of Cuffs as Bethany Hawkins.

In 2020, Coomber made guest roles in the television series' Flack, Deceived, and Strike. In 2023, Coomber was announced to be starring as Chantrelle in the ITV drama Three Little Birds, a drama written by Lenny Henry based on his mother's arriving in Britain from Jamaica as part of the Windrush generation in 1957.

=== Theatre ===
In 2019, Coomber starred as Emilia in the play of the same name, alongside Adelle Leonce and fellow EastEnders co-star Clare Perkins, who played older versions of the character. Coomber's other stage credits include Sonnet Sunday and A New and Better You.

== Filmography ==
Year	Title	Role	Notes
2003	EyeToy: Play	Additional Voices	Video game
2008	Dustbin Baby	Cathy	Television film
2009	Runaway	Molly	3 episodes
2009	The Bill	Rebecca Evans	Episode: "Down South"
2009	Doctors	Asha Bass	Episode: "Guidance"
2010–2012	Tracy Beaker Returns	Sapphire Fox	Regular role
2011–2012	Tracy Beaker Survival Files	Sapphire Fox	Regular role
2012	Holby City	Lauren Earnshaw	Episode: "To Absent Friends"
2012–2013	EastEnders	Alexa Smith	Recurring role; 7 episodes
2013	Youngers	Box Office Girl	1 episode
2014	Electricity	Rachel	Short film
2015	Mingmong	Annalise	Short film
2015	Cuffs	Bethany Hawkins	3 episodes
2015	The Dumping Ground Dish Up	Sapphire Fox	Regular role
2019	At Any Time	Lauren	Short film
2019	China Towns	Janet	
2020	Flack	Steph	3 episodes
2020	The Deceived	Annabelle	2 episodes
2020	Strike	Flick Purdue	3 episodes
2020	Small Axe	Grace	Episode: "Lovers Rock"
2023	Three Little Birds	Chantrelle	Main role
