= Whatever It Takes (2009 film) =

- Genre: Drama
- Written by: Paula Milne
- Directed by: Andy Hay
- Starring: Shane Richie; Amy Beth Hayes; Sara Alexander; Gary Lucy; Ron Cook
- Country of origin: United Kingdom
- Original language: English

Production
- Producer: Nick Pitt
- Running time: 90 minutes
- Production company: Twenty Twenty Television

Original release
- Network: ITV
- Release: 26 July 2009

Whatever it Takes is a 2009 British television drama film directed by Andy Hay and starring Shane Richie, Amy Beth Hayes, Sara Alexander, Gary Lucy and Ron Cook. Ritchie plays a publicist observing and interacting on the story of Daisy Cockram, a police officer catapulted to fame after she is arrested for public indecency with a footballer in the back of a car and who becomes a national celebrity, which is soon shown to have many pitfalls. The moral of the story being "be careful what you wish for". It was first aired on ITV (ITV1 & UTV) on Sunday 26 July 2009.

== Plot ==
JJ Merrick (Ritchie) is narrating the story of Daisy Cockram who is about to be "devoured by the venus flytrap of fame" after winning tickets to attend a première when she meets a leading professional footballer who seduces her. Shortly afterwards they are discovered having sexual intercourse in the back of a car by a police patrol officer and taken in. This is particularly embarrassing for Daisy as she is herself a police officer - and she is fast suspended from duty for bringing the force into disrepute. The tabloid newspapers speedily track Daisy down using various underhand methods and she is soon splashed across the front pages of the media, with many lurid and exaggerated details about her life.

It is at this point that she approached by JJ Merrick, who offers to represent her and help her out. She is hoping he will be able to hold the press off, so that she can appeal against her dismissal from the police, but he insists that is impossible once the media has scented blood. Instead he impresses on her the need to get her side of the story across. He sets up a major deal with a Sunday Newspaper, and arranges a photo-shoot where a number of glamour shots are taken with Daisy taking provocative poses. At first she is withdrawn and uncomfortable, but soon relaxes and proves to be a natural in front of the camera.

As Merrick had predicted, the kiss-and-tell article proves a major success, launching Daisy into the spotlight. However it leads to an angry row with her father, a senior police officer, who considers her "a slut" and is hurt at how her behaviour has undermined people's respect for him. Her sister is not as angry as father, but she is also made unhappy by the new public persona of Daisy. Daisy is distressed by her family's reaction, but it does not change her interest in pursuing a new career as a celebrity. Her management by JJ Merrick helps her to scale new heights in the celebrity world, where her freshness help propel her upwards.

JJ has become increasingly cynical about his profession, yet he manages to successfully bury his misgivings and has moved to the top of his game. He revels in his own invisibility, he is unknown to the public at large which gives him enormous power. He visits her a year later remarking "if a week is a long time in politics, a year is a lifetime in show business". He is paying a visit to Daisy who has now changed completely beyond recognition. She has moved from her dingy tower-block flat to a large country mansion, has had numerous plastic surgery operations and is now dating a leading soap actor.

Daisy now has a seemingly "perfect life", in which she has become a sexual icon - an idol for many teenage girls, lots of money and a large personal staff. She has ambitions to launch a singing career as well. She is able to pick up large fees just for turning up for public appearances. However the first cracks begin to appear in her life - pictures of her having sex are being sold to the newspapers, she has not had an invite to her sister’s wedding and she is finally pictured snorting cocaine. This provokes a howl of condemnation of her from the media, led by a hatchet-job article written by a leading left-wing journalist from the leading broadsheets.

On the advice of Merrick, she stages an overdose and then goes to a private hospital to recover. As Merrick had intended this stokes public interest and gains her a deal of sympathy. However shortly afterwards a rival appears on the scene who steals the show from Daisy. Kaitlin now has a fresh face, and natural breasts, and she is fast elbowing Daisy aside. Merrick knowing that celebrity is merely a carousel promptly signs up Kaitlin and makes her his new protégé - effectively abandoning Daisy. He tells her she has had a good run, made several million pounds with no discernible talent - and should get out of showbusiness while she still could with some sort of humanity left inside.

Instead of Daisy taking his advice, she instead stages an orgy with the soap actor and releases it to the press, in a last attempt to claw back some public interest, showing as Merrick had observed that she has become totally addicted to celebrity.

== Cast ==
- Shane Richie - JJ Merrick
- Amy Beth Hayes - Daisy Cockram
- Ron Cook - David Cockram
- Sara Alexander - Ella Cockram
- Gary Lucy - Matthew Cassaday
- Jill Baker - Estelle
- Lucy Gaskell - Fiona
- Sadie Pickering - Caitlin
- Chantelle Houghton - herself

== Reception ==
Whatever It Takes attracted 2.7 million viewers when it was aired, losing out in its time slot to the BBC documentary Rivers presented by Griff Rhys Jones. The critical reception was generally poor, The Mirror described it as "shameful" and attacked it for miscasting and being out of date.
