= Amy Beth Hayes =

Welsh actress (born 1982)

- Born: 8 October 1982 (age 43); Abergavenny, Wales
- Education: Keble College, Oxford, and Central School of Speech and Drama
- Years active: 2008–present

Amy Beth Hayes (born 8 October 1982) is a British actress. She is best known for her roles as Kitty in Mr Selfridge; Lucy in "The Entire History of You", an episode of Black Mirror; Ruth in Misfits; Clem in Shameless; Amy in The Syndicate; and Maxine Fox in Sirens. She has also appeared in Doctor Who and Secret Diary of a Call Girl.

== Early life ==
Hayes was born in Abergavenny, Wales, but grew up in Darlington, County Durham, England. Her first taste of acting was as a 14 year old at the National Youth Theatre, she joined a course with much older students and decided to pursue acting as a possible career path. However, first she chose the academic route, studying English Literature and Language at Keble College, Oxford. After graduating, she enrolled at the Central School of Speech and Drama for three years.

== Career ==
Hayes career started with a 4 month stay in Romania, filming Eva, later released in 2009. Her screen debut came in 2008, in Doctor Who, episode "The Stolen Earth", and the same year she was cast in a lead role in the ITV drama Whatever It Takes.

Hayes appeared in the 2009 Romanian film Eva, and in Micro Men, a BBC-made film charting the rise and fall of the home computer industry in the United Kingdom in the early 1980s, where she played Cynthia alongside Martin Freeman. In 2009, she played Ruth, an old woman restored temporarily to her younger self by a peculiar thunder storm, in E4's superhero comedy-drama Misfits.

In 2011 she played Lucy in "The Entire History of You", an episode of the anthology series Black Mirror created by Charlie Brooker. In 2012, she starred in BBC drama The Syndicate, alongside Timothy Spall, playing the girlfriend of one of the lottery winners.

From 2012, she appeared in the ITV drama Mr Selfridge as Kitty Hawkins Edwards. In 2013, she appeared as Rosemary in the Norwegian comedy-gangster television series Lilyhammer, alongside Steve van Zandt.

In 2019, Hayes played Charlotte Bellinge in an episode of the Acorn TV series Agatha Raisin. In 2020, she played the role of Lady Trowbridge in Netflix's Bridgerton. In 2021, she starred in Lenny Henry's Three Little Birds.

== Theatre ==
In 2008, Hayes appeared in On the Waterfront directed by Steven Berkoff. She received a nomination for Best Supporting Actress at the Manchester Evening News Theatre Awards for her work in True Love Lies (2009), at the Royal Exchange, Manchester. She appeared in Jerusalem in 2010, with Mark Rylance, and in Linda at the Royal Court Theatre (2015–2016). and Hayes received a nomination for Best Supporting Actress at the Manchester Evening News Theatre Awards for her work in True Love Lies at the Royal Exchange, Manchester.

== Acting credits ==
=== Film ===
Year	Title	Role	Notes
2009	Whatever It Takes	Daisy Cockram	TV film
2009	Micro Men	Cynthia	TV film
2010	Eva	Eva	
2014	United We Fall	Beth Amoako	
2021	The Power	Sister	

=== Television ===
Year	Title	Role	Notes
2008	Doctor Who	Albino Servant	Episode: "The Stolen Earth"
2008	Harry & Paul	Siobhan the Receptionist	Series 2, Episode 3
2008	The Children	Kelly	Mini-series
2009	FM	Evie	Episode: "Blinded by the Light"
2009	Misfits	Young Ruth	2 episode
2011	Secret Diary of a Call Girl	Amber	2 episodes
2011	Case Sensitive	Sally Thorne	Episode: "The Point of Rescue"
2011	Sirens	Maxine Fox	Series regular
2011	Black Mirror	Lucy	Episode: "The Entire History of You"
2012	Shameless	Clem	2 episodes
2012	The Syndicate	Amy Cartwright	Series regular
2013	Lilyhammer	Rosemary	3 episodes
2013–2016	Mr Selfridge	Kitty Hawkins / Edwards	Series regular
2017	Death in Paradise	Sophie Boyd	Episode: "Man Overboard"
2017	Timewasters	Nicola	Episode: "Return of the Macs"
2017	Love, Lies and Records	Saskia	1 episode
2018	Action Team	Samantha	3 episodes
2019	Agatha Raisin	Charlotte Bellinge	Episode: "The Curious Curate"
2019	The Mallorca Files	Leanna Mountford	Episode: "Death in the Morning"
2020	Flack	Cheryl	2 episodes
2020	Bridgerton	Lady Trowbridge	2 episodes
2021	Princess Mirror-Belle	Mum	10 episodes
2023	Three Little Birds	Diana Wantage	4 episodes

=== Audio dramas ===
Year	Title	Role	Notes
2022	Torchwood Soho	Helena Brompton	6 episodes
2023	Torchwood: The Story Continues	Tania	Episode: "Propaganda"

=== Theatre ===
Year	Title	Role	Director	Venue	Notes	Ref.
2009	True Love Lies	Madison	Braham Murray	The Royal Exchange		
2010	Jerusalem	Dawn	Ian Rickson	Royal Court Theatre		
2011	Les Liaisons Dangerouses	Emilie	Gerald Garutti	Royal Shakespeare Theatre	Royal Shakespeare Company	
2015	Linda	Amy	Michael Longhurst	Royal Court Theatre		
2023	Cracked	Woman		Waterloo East Theatre	Vault Festival; Writer; debut performance	
