= Aykut Hilmi =

Aykut Hilmi (born in London, United Kingdom) is a British actor and model. He is best known for starring in numerous West End theatres (such as the Royal Opera House and the Royal National Theatre) and his role in the film Mamma Mia!. Hilmi has also appeared in several TV episodes including: Zen, Spooks, The IT Crowd, and Panorama. His father is a Turkish Cypriot and his mother is Italian. Aykut resides in North London, with his wife and child.

== Theatre ==
Actor
Play	Role	Venue
Dalston Songs	Naz	Royal Opera House
Fram	Imran (the poet)	Royal National Theatre
Macbeth	Banquo	Courtyard Theatre
Not the love I cry for	Emin	Arcola Theatre
Saturday Night Fever	Tony	Apollo Victoria Theatre and in Germany/Scandinavia
Yesterday Was a Weird Day	Dave	Battersea Arts Centre
Identity Panic	Tony	Greenwich Playhouse
The Curse of the Starving Class	Wesley	Cockpit Theatre
West Side Story	Chino	Haymarket Theatre
Aladdin	Aladdin	Malvern Theatre
Quiet Storm	Marco	CockEyed Productions

== Filmography ==
Year	Film	Role	Notes
2003	Dinotopia	Skybax Pilot	TV series (1 episode)
2004	Beyond the Sea	Slim	
2007	The IT Crowd	Fitness Instructor / Karl	TV series (1 episode)
2007	Spooks	Abdul Kharami	TV series (1 episode)
2008	Mamma Mia!	Stag	
2009	Nine	Reporter	
2011	Zen	Italian Policeman	TV series (1 episode)
2012	EastEnders	Nico Papadopoulos	TV soap opera (9 episodes)
2016	24-Live Another Day	Head MI5 Agent	TV series (9 episodes)
2017	Benidorm	Jose	TV soap opera (2 episodes)
2017	War Machine	Afgan Beurocrate	TV series (2 episodes)
2017	Jack Ryan	Hakan	TV film (2 episodes)
2018	Fantastic Beasts: The Crimes of Grindelwald	Shafiq	
2022	The Sandman	Pub Visitor #4 (1389)	TV series (1 episode)
