= Eva (2010 film) =

- Directed by: Adrian Popovici
- Written by: Steve Attridge; Radu Petrescu-Aneste; Adrian Popovici
- Produced by: Cornelia Palos; Adrian Popovici
- Starring: Amy Beth Hayes; Patrick Bergin; Dustin Milligan; Maia Morgenstern; Vlad Radescu; Claudiu Bleonț
- Cinematography: Mihail Sarbusca
- Edited by: Tudor Chivulescu
- Music by: Vlady Cnejevici
- Distributed by: MarVista Entertainment
- Release dates: March 23, 2010 (Hungary); October 8, 2010 (Romania)
- Running time: 90 minutes
- Country: Romania
- Language: English

Eva is a 2010 Romanian drama film directed by Adrian Popovici. It premiered on 20 May 2010 at the Cannes Film Festival.

== Plot ==
As Europe reels amidst the Second World War, Eva faces immense tragedy as she struggles for love and her own survival.

== Cast ==
- Amy Beth Hayes as Eva
- Patrick Bergin as Oswald
- Dustin Milligan as Lucien
- Maia Morgenstern as Maria
- Vlad Rădescu as Gunther
- Claudiu Bleonț as Doctor
- Vincent Regan as Tudor
- Michael Ironside as Alfonse
- Emily Hamilton as Betty
