= Three Little Birds (TV series) =

British television series

- Written by: Lenny Henry
- Country of origin: United Kingdom
- Original language: English
- No. of series: 1
- No. of episodes: 6

Production
- Executive producers: Russell T Davies; Sir Lenny Henry; Angela Ferreira; Lucy Bedford; Diederick Santer
- Production companies: Tiger Aspect Productions; Douglas Road Productions

Original release
- Network: ITV1
- Release: 22 October 2023

Three Little Birds is a British historical drama television series written by Lenny Henry in collaboration with Russell T Davies. Developed by Douglas Road and Tiger Aspect Productions under Banijay UK, the six-part series is based on Henry's mother Winifred's experiences arriving in Britain from Jamaica as part of the Windrush generation in 1957.

It premiered on 22 October 2023 on ITV1.

== Synopsis ==
Two sisters, Leah and Chantrelle, and their acquaintance Hosanna travel by steamboat from Saint Ann Parish in Jamaica to the United Kingdom in the 1950s, arriving in London's Notting Hill and later moving to the Midlands.

== Cast ==
- Rochelle Neil as Leah Whittaker, who moves to England without her three children to escape her abusive husband
- Yazmin Belo as Hosanna Drake, Leah's religious friend
- Saffron Coomber as Chantrelle Brahms, Leah's younger half-sister who becomes a tutor
- Javone Prince as Aston Brahms, Leah and Chantrelle's older brother who already lives in England
- Bobby Gordon as Shelton Powell, who moved to England as part of the RAF
- Arthur Darvill as Ernest Wantage, a man who employs Chantrelle as a tutor
- Amy Beth Hayes as Diana Wantage, Ernest's wife
- Michelle Fox as Siobhan
- Michael Crump as Jimmy
- Leemore Marrett, Jr. as Ephraim Whittaker, Leah's abusive husband
- Tierney Turner as Selah Whittaker, Leah's and Ephraim youngest child
- Malachi Hall as Caleb Whittaker, Leah's and Ephraim middle child
- Shay Descartes as Gideon Whittaker, Leah's and Ephraim eldest child
- Mitch Morgan as Ewan Boyce
- Elaine Ward as Mrs. Boyce
- Liberty Miller as Rosie Hawksley
- Susan Lawson-Reynolds as Momma Gladys, mother of Leah, Chantrelle and Aston
- Lenny Henry as Remuel Drake, Hosanna's father
- Shobu Kapoor as Mrs. Biswas
- Shvorne Marks as Bernadette
- Allyson Devenish as Winifred Atwell
- Gamba Cole as Gregory

== Production ==
=== Development ===
In December 2020, it was announced ITV had commissioned Three Little Birds from Lenny Henry, who would write and executive produce the six-part fictionalisation of his mother Winifred's stories. Russell T Davies was attached to the project as a script consultant and executive producer. Also set to executive produce were Angela Ferreira of Douglas Road Productions, Lucy Bedford of Tiger Aspect Productions, and Diederick Santer of BritBox International.

Henry described it as a "dream come true. This series will be a tribute to the giants who came before us". Henry described Davies having "mentored" him through the writing process. In October 2022, speaking after he picked up the Special Recognition award at the National Television Awards at Wembley Arena, Henry said, "I hope the show will make you laugh and cry and understand how it was for those men and women to swap the sun and the sea for the rain and the cold. They were seeking a better place where not everybody was welcoming. We wanted to make a drama that showed what it took to overcome great adversity. When we can relate to each other it brings us together, right? This is a time for people like us to be together, to be allies, telling all kinds of stories and leaving no one behind. I want to thank everybody who’s helped me to get to where I am."

=== Casting ===
The cast was announced in November 2022, with Rochelle Neil, Yazmin Belo, and Saffron Coomber set to star in Three Little Birds. Also joining the cast were Javone Prince, Bobby Gordon, Arthur Darvill, Amy Beth Hayes and Michelle Fox.

=== Filming ===
Filming took place at the Green Man pub and Clarendon Square in Leamington Spa in September 2022. Filming locations in the Midlands also included Dudley Zoo and Castle Coventry, with Spon Street as a location with period-era shop signs, transport and decor. Filming was reported in October 2022 at the TSS Duke of Lancaster, which is docked in Llannerch-y-Mor Wharf at northeast Wales. November saw filming on Fitton Street in Nuneaton.

== Release ==
With the announcement of ITV's new streaming service ITVX in March 2022, it was revealed Three Little Birds would be launched on the platform in advance of airing on ITV. In June 2022, BritBox boarded the project as an international distributor.

At the 2022 National Television Awards, Henry said Three Little Birds would be aired in 2023. The series was showcased at the London Screenings.

Three Little Birds premiered on ITV1 on 22 October 2023. After the first episode had aired, the whole series was made available on ITVX streaming service.

== Reception ==
The series won the Scripted prize at the Royal Television Society Midlands Television Awards in 2024.
