= Frances Lima =

British actress

Frances Lima is a British actress known for her brief role as Georgina Lee in ITV soap opera Emmerdale. She also been a guest on The Bill for three episodes.

== Filmography ==
- The Imitators (1996)
- The Theory of Flight (1998)
- Metrosexuality (1999)
- The Bill (2000–2005)
- Rocket Man (2005)
- EastEnders (2012)
