= Sara Alexander =

British actress (born 1976)

- Born: Sara Jane Alexander; 9 August 1976 (age 49)
- Occupations: Actress, presenter, voice actress
- Known for: Shortest-serving CBeebies presenter
- Spouse: Cory English

Sara Jane "Eva" Alexander (born 9 August 1976) is a British actress, writer and was a television presenter. Eva is pronounced "Ava".

== Career ==
Until March 2007, she was a continuity presenter on the BBC preschool television channel CBeebies, joining as a replacement for Nicole Davis who left in February 2006. She became and still is the shortest-serving presenter at just thirteen months.

In 1993, Alexander appeared (under her real name) in Franco Zeffirelli's film Storia di una capinera (aka Sparrow).

Alexander has had a variety of small parts in television dramas such as Waking the Dead, The Brief and Casualty, in addition to a range of theatre and radio work. She also starred in the Children's BBC programme The Mysti Show as Ella, a stubborn teenager who is helped by Mystical Rainbowfrost (aka Mysti), a fairy who can change into a human. She appeared in the 2009 ITV drama Whatever It Takes and in 2010 she appeared once again on CBBC, this time as the character Gill in Hounded. She appeared in the 2010 film Harry Potter and the Deathly Hallows – Part 1 as a waitress. Most recently, she was in an episode of the BBC series: Cuffs.

== Personal life ==
She attended the University of Bristol, graduating in 1997, and also attended The Drama Studio London where she gained a postgraduate diploma in acting. She is married to American actor Cory English.
