= Phaldut Sharma =

British actor

Phaldut "Paul" Sharma
- Born: Phaldut Sharma
- Occupations: Actor; dancer

Phaldut "Paul" Sharma is a Welsh dancer and actor, best known for playing AJ Ahmed in EastEnders, Achmed in Gavin & Stacey and as DCI Ram Sidhu in Unforgotten. Sharma is also known for his recurring work as a Sammy Davis Junior tribute act in both West End Theatre and web series and for his roles in the Alfonso Cuarón movies Children of Men and Gravity.

== Early life ==
Sharma was born in London to Guyanese Hindu parents, whose ancestors came from Uttar Pradesh, before they moved to Newport, Wales in his youth.

== Career ==
=== Television and film ===
Sharma played Vinnay Ramdas in Casualty and then Damon Lynch in 2011, Rajiv in comedy-drama Roger Roger and Paul in Meet the Magoons. He has also appeared in episodes of Life on Mars, Dalziel and Pascoe and the BBC daytime series Doctors. also appeared in one episode of Ultimate Force Series 4 Episode 3 "the dividing line".

Sharma was in the first episode of the UK comedy The Office, playing Sanj, and was Stacey Shipman's (Joanna Page) ex-fiancé, Achmed, in Gavin & Stacey. In 2009, Sharma appeared as Hindu nationalist Harish Dhillon in an episode of Spooks. In 2012, Sharma was cast in EastEnders as Masood Ahmed's (Nitin Ganatra) brother AJ, a regular character. He left the soap opera in 2014. He also appeared in episode six of Hunted.

In 2013, Sharma garnered notable attention from South Asian outlets for a small role in the 2013 science fiction move Gravity, where he chose to sing a short portion of the popular Hindi song Mera Joota Hai Japani.

In 2015, Sharma released 'I Gotta Be Me' - a ten-part web comedy in which he plays Paul Shah - a semi-autobiographical character based on his experience as a Sammy Davis Junior tribute act. He also appeared as Leigh in episodes four and five of Cucumber. In 2019, he appeared as Tom, the father of Sophie who befriends the titular character in season 1 of Hanna.

In 2021, Sharma appeared as DCI Ram Sidhu in the fourth series of ITV drama Unforgotten. In 2023 he filmed the BBC television feature Men Up, about the first clinical trials for the drug Viagra that took place in Swansea in 1994. He plays Peetham "Pete" Shah.

In early 2025 he appeared in the sixth series of Unforgotten, reprising the role of Ram Sidhu.

=== Stage ===
Sharma played Sammy Davis Jr in the West End production of Rat Pack Confidential in 2003.

From September to October 2010, he appeared in Factory Theatre Company's Boiling Frogs at Southwark Playhouse, London.
