= List of EastEnders characters introduced in 2011 =

EastEnders logo

The following are characters who first appeared in the BBC soap opera EastEnders during 2011 listed by order of first appearance. New characters were introduced by Bryan Kirkwood, executive producer. The first regular character to be announced was Eddie Moon (David Essex), the father of Michael Moon (Steve John Shepherd). Poppy Meadow (Rachel Bright) was introduced in January 2011 as the best friend of Jodie Gold (Kylie Babbington), and Rob Grayson (Jody Latham) joined the series in February, as did Shenice Quinn (Lily Harvey). Ashley Chubb (Colin Mace) was introduced in March as the father of established character Fatboy (Ricky Norwood). In April, Janine Butcher's (Charlie Brooks) maternal grandmother, Lydia Simmonds (Margaret Tyzack/Heather Chasen), and Tanya Branning (Jo Joyner) and Rainie Cross' (Tanya Franks) mother, Cora Cross (Ann Mitchell), both joined the series and Martin (Alasdair Harvey) was introduced as the new love interest for Jane Beale (Laurie Brett). Eddie's sons Tyler (Tony Discipline) and Anthony Moon (Matt Lapinskas) were announced in May along with Dot Branning's (June Brown) half-sister, Rose Cotton (Polly Perkins) and her son Andrew (Ricky Grover). Lola Pearce (Danielle Harold), the granddaughter of Billy Mitchell (Perry Fenwick) and Julie Perkins (Cathy Murphy), was announced in June along with Norman Simmonds (George Layton), Lydia's son. A fourth Moon brother was introduced in September, Craig (Elliot Rosen), as well as Faith Olubunmi (Modupe Adeyeye), the younger sister of Mercy Olubunmi (Bunmi Mojekwu). In October, Syed (Marc Elliott) and Amira Masood's (Preeya Kalidas) daughter Yasmin arrives and Mark Garland (Chris Simmons) was introduced as a new love interest for Kat Moon (Jessie Wallace).

== Poppy Meadow ==
Poppy Meadow, played by Rachel Bright, was introduced by executive producer Bryan Kirkwood on 11 January 2011 as the best friend of established character Jodie Gold (Kylie Babbington) in scenes filling in for those cut from a controversial baby-swap storyline. Poppy returned to the series in June 2011 as a supporting character and comedy element, in a move that was generally welcomed by the tabloid press; her storylines focused on her friendship with Jodie and their intertwined love lives. Both Jodie and Poppy left the series on 14 November 2011, but the possibility was left open for Poppy to return in the future. In June 2012 Bright reprised her role as Poppy, quickly moving into Walford and resuming her employment at the local beauty salon. Bright filmed her final scenes before Christmas 2013 and Poppy departed in the last week of January 2014.

== Rob Grayson ==
Rob Grayson
- EastEnders character
- Portrayed by: Jody Latham
- First appearance: Episode 4166; 22 February 2011
- Last appearance: Episode 4272; 26 August 2011
- Introduced by: Bryan Kirkwood
In-universe information
- Occupation: Pimp

Rob Grayson, played by Jody Latham, is a pimp who exploits Whitney Dean (Shona McGarty) for financial gain. His first appearance was on 22 February 2011, and he appeared until a special Comic Relief episode on 18 March 2011. He made a short return from 19 August 2011 until 26 August 2011.

He first appears when he witnesses Whitney attempting to pickpocket a man but ending up with cuts on her face. Rob rescues her from the situation, and buys her a meal. He gives her his number so she can contact him any time she needs to get away from Walford, before taking her home. They stay in contact and Rob is seen showing a friend a photo of Whitney. When Whitney either rejects or is rejected by all her friends and family, she contacts Rob and he takes her to stay with him. After Whitney has been missing for several days, Lauren Branning (Jacqueline Jossa) tries to phone her, leaving several messages. When she finally gets a voicemail back, it is from Rob saying if she calls again, there will be trouble.

Lauren tracks Whitney down to Dartford, but Whitney insists she is fine with Rob, and that they are in love. Rob meets Lauren at their bedsit and invites her out with them, but Lauren leaves. Rob then leaves Whitney alone with Chris (Richard Simons) and it is revealed that Rob is using Whitney to pay off his debts. Rob meets Lauren in a café and again invites her out and calls her beautiful. He then threatens her, saying he does not want to see her again. When Rob returns to the bedsit, Whitney is there with Janine Malloy (Charlie Brooks), who says she is taking Whitney home. Whitney refuses to go and Rob ejects Janine from the building. Rob then tells Whitney they are going out immediately, and drags her to the car as she refuses to go. Lauren and Janine watch as Rob drives away with Whitney. Rob takes Whitney to a house where she meets Chloe (Georgia Henshaw), another girl being exploited. Whitney realises she is there to have sex with men, so asks Rob if she can leave. Rob says to either be nice to his friends or he will hurt her. He grabs her and locks her in a room. She is unable to open the windows so when she hears people outside the door, she smashes a window, jumps to the ground and runs away with Rob calling after her. She then stops a car and asks for help. She later returns to Walford after being arrested for shoplifting. Whitney's half-brother Ryan Malloy (Neil McDermott) learns of what happened and wants to find Rob but Whitney says he has moved.

When Whitney starts a relationship with a man named Lee (Mitchell Hunt), it is revealed that he is a friend of Rob's, and when Whitney agrees to meet Lee by text, Rob takes control of Lee's mobile phone. Whitney goes to meet Lee and is shocked to see Rob instead. She is taken in by his charm until she texts Lee not to come, and then sees the message on Rob's phone. She allows Rob to take her home but then tells him to wait outside while she escapes through the back door and hitches a lift to Southend-on-Sea with friends. She leaves Rob a voicemail message not knowing that he has followed her. He finds her in her hotel room and tells her how much he loves her, but when Fatboy (Ricky Norwood) comes in, Rob attacks him, so Whitney tells him to leave. Fatboy calls Ryan, who comes to Southend to look for Rob. When he finds him, they fight and fall over the edge of the pier. A body is recovered from the sea, and is later revealed to be Rob's.

=== Development ===
In January 2011, it was announced that Whitney would be part of the sexual exploitation storyline. She is left alone and vulnerable, and falls for Rob, who then exploits her. EastEnders worked alongside charity Comic Relief on the storyline, which started planning in 2010. The storyline culminated during Red Nose Day 2011 on 18 March 2011, in a special 10-minute episode. Gilly Green, Head of UK Grants at Comic Relief, said: "It is vital that we continue to alert young people to the dangers if we are to stop them being exploited and the opportunity to work with EastEnders will make a huge audience aware of this issue. We have been working with the EastEnders script writers and some of the young women from projects we support to ensure the story reflects the reality of young people caught up in sexual exploitation." Kevin Cahill, Chief Executive of Comic Relief, added "We have worked over many years with EastEnders in all kinds of ways. It's been a real pleasure this year to work together on a piece of serious drama, in the best traditions of public service, which will highlight an important issue and also, because it occurs on the night of Comic Relief, actually help raise crucial funds to help young women caught up in it." An EastEnders insider spoke of the storyline leading up to Rob's arrival: "Janine's a terrible influence and is soon dragging Whitney into all sorts of shady schemes. Given that Janine used to be a prostitute, it makes sense that she's part of Whitney's journey. Whitney has no idea what she's letting herself in for. Janine is only part of the problem though. It's when she meets Rob—a deeply unscrupulous man—that her life starts to fall apart in a terrifying way." Rob has been called "evil" by The People and by executive producer Bryan Kirkwood, a "nasty piece of work" by Orange, and "sinister" by Daniel Kilkelly from Digital Spy.

McGarty hoped the storyline would raise awareness of the issue for young people, and explained that the storyline would be a continuing one, as "Whitney will live in fear that Rob and his gang are going to come after her when she escapes. That's what these people do. They don't just leave you to get on with your life. In their mind they own you." She also added that she hopes that the storyline will lead to better conviction rates as she said that they aren't 'good enough'. Latham revealed after his stint that he hoped to return, saying, "I always say it's better to play the bad guy—everyone remembers the bad guy. They get the best endings. I had an absolutely great time on EastEnders. It was a breath of fresh air. [...] Judging from the way it was left, the door is wide open, so you never know. I would love to come back and cause some trouble."

On 1 May 2011 it was reported by the Daily Star that Latham would return to EastEnders in a couple of weeks time to film the conclusion to the storyline. A source said, "Whitney will not be going back on the streets but the writers felt the storyline needed to be tied up so Jody is coming back for a couple of episodes. Whitney is currently having to come to terms with everything that she did while under Rob's spell and she's not coping very well. She's trying to move on but, with everyone knowing that she worked as a prostitute, she's finding it all very difficult. The writers decided it would be good for her to come face to face with Rob again once she's strong enough to do so. They've written the conclusion to her storyline and Jody will be back to film the dramatic ending in a couple of weeks time. Rob is set to finally get his come-uppance [sic]." An EastEnders spokesperson confirmed this. Kirkwood said that Rob would return when Whitney is at her most vulnerable, following the reveal of her brother Ryan's affair with her best friend Lauren. Scenes were filmed in Southend-on-Sea, Essex, for Rob's return, after Ryan tracks Rob down and finds Whitney with him. Ryan and Rob had a massive showdown on the pier, and Ryan murdered Rob as revenge for forcing Whitney into prostitution. Ryan then went on the run from the police, not wanting to get caught for murdering Rob.

Latham had received criticism from viewers who struggled to understand his Burnley accent. He said, "I'm sorry people are having difficulty with my accent. I'm sure the great fans of EastEnders will get used to it!" The storyline reportedly received criticism from fans. The BBC issued a statement, saying:

The EastEnders audience would have been aware of the dark situation Whitney was getting into. In the preceding episodes viewers saw Whitney feeling increasingly unwanted and unloved, with her brother and her step-mother absent, her life was taking a downward spiral. [...] It was a natural progression of Whitney's story thus far and we felt it was an important story to tell, and hopefully to raise awareness of amongst our audience. In doing so, we believe it was right to show the—albeit unpleasant—reality of the situation faced by these girls, rather than put a gloss on it. In the episode Whitney is seen to escape and to raise the alarm—we did not leave the audience on a cliffhanger. The menace and danger Whitney is in whilst clear is implied rather than graphic or sensationalised and is in keeping with the audience expectations of how EastEnders would tackle a tough story in a pre-watershed manner and indeed how Whitney's story has evolved over the last few years. We are conscious that Red Nose Day programming includes many different tones and themes, ranging from light comedy sketches to difficult and emotional appeal films, all of which played out around the time the EastEnders episode was scheduled to transmit. We hope that the majority of the audience would have heard the first extended warning and that the serious tone of the introduction, though truncated, pointed to the fact that the upcoming film was a gear change. It was further put into context by the presenters at the end of the piece, when they talked about the Comic Relief-funded charities working to help girls like Whitney."

Speaking about how members of the public reacted to the storyline, Latham told OK!, "Considering Rob makes Phil Mitchell look like a field mouse, I've got to be quite grateful. I've not had a tin of baked beans chucked at me in Asda by some nice old lady. It's just a bit of banter off the public, which I relish. I've not had anyone threaten to beat me up yet, which is a plus point!"

== Martina Quinn ==
Martina Quinn
- EastEnders character
- Portrayed by: Tamara Wall
- First appearance: Episode 4169; 28 February 2011
- Last appearance: Episode 4175; 10 March 2011
- Introduced by: Bryan Kirkwood
In-universe information
- Daughters: Shenice Quinn

Martina Quinn, portrayed by Tamara Wall, was an old friend of Kat Moon's (Jessie Wallace) from Spain, who reported Kat and her husband Alfie Moon (Shane Richie) to the police in Spain, leading to some animosity between Kat and Martina. Martina and her daughter Shenice (Lily Harvey) arrive at The Queen Victoria public house, and Kat immediately throws water over Martina. However, she reveals that her bar was smashed up by the police and she was worried that she would lose Shenice if she did not tell the truth. Alfie bonds with Shenice, and Martina tells Kat that she has lost her bar and has nothing left, so Kat allows her them to stay. After a night out with Kat, Martina spends the day in bed. Kat later finds Shenice wearing her clothes and makeup. Kat shouts at Shenice to take the clothes off, and Shenice flinches thinking Kat is going to hit her. The next day, Shenice is caught trying to steal cigarettes from the local shop, which Kat chastises a drunken Martina for. Martina calls her daughter useless before going to bed, and Shenice tells Kat and Alfie that Martina says things she does not mean when she is drunk. The next day, Martina tells Kat that she will get some money so she and Shenice can move out and that she is back with her boyfriend. Kat and Alfie organise a birthday party for Shenice as Martina has forgotten and Shenice takes a disliking to Tiffany Butcher (Maisie Smith) as they are wearing the same outfit. Shenice has to leave halfway through the party as Martina finds a place to live, and they move out, leaving Alfie and Kat distraught. They return to Spain, but Shenice later returns with Kat and Alfie after a holiday. When Shenice goes to visit Martina in Spain, Martina gets herself more settled and Shenice stays with her.

=== Departure ===
In July 2020, Wall, who was now known for playing series regular, Grace Black in Channel 4 soap opera, Hollyoaks, explained to Digital Spy why her character "disappeared into obscurity back in 2011." She said that her character was "meant to develop into something more". Wall told The Dog in the Pond podcast host, Kelly Condron, "I ended up doing this little part in EastEnders, which was meant to develop into something more. And then there was the whole thing at EastEnders with the baby swapping story, which just went ridiculous. For whatever reason, Bryan [Kirkwood, producer] decided to leave EastEnders and because of that, whoever came in went: 'Oh, I don't know who Tamara is'. My character was dropped." Wall described the situation to be "really funny," as she had left her daughter Shenice in a bedroom in The Vic all on her own, without saying anything. Wall continued to explain what happened to her character, but also how it helped her get her role as Grace in Hollyoaks, where Bryan Kirkwood became executive producer after leaving EastEnders: "The best thing is that, unlike anything in this business, I got a hand-written letter from Bryan through the post to my home address saying: 'I'm so, so sorry it didn't work out for your part.'I thought you were fabulous and I feel partly responsible for the fact that the part hasn't carried on. I want you to know that, wherever I go to from now on, you will be first in my thoughts if something crops up'. What a lovely thing to do."

== Shenice Quinn ==
Shenice Quinn
- EastEnders character
- Portrayed by: Lily Harvey
- Duration: 2011–2012
- First appearance: Episode 4169; 28 February 2011
- Last appearance: Episode 4466; 23 July 2012
- Introduced by: Bryan Kirkwood
In-universe information
- Mother: Martina Quinn

Shenice Quinn, played by nine-year-old (at the time of casting) Lily Harvey, is the daughter of Martina Quinn (Tamara Wall), who is an old friend of Kat Moon's (Jessie Wallace) from Spain. Martina reported Kat and her husband Alfie Moon (Shane Richie) to the police in Spain, leading to some animosity between Kat and Martina. Martina and Shenice arrive at The Queen Victoria public house, and Kat immediately throws water over Martina. However, she reveals that her bar was smashed up by the police and she was worried that she would lose Shenice if she did not tell the truth. Alfie bonds with Shenice, and Martina tells Kat that she has lost her bar and has nothing left, so Kat allows them to stay with her and Alfie at The Queen Vic. After a night out with Kat, Martina spends the day in bed. Kat later finds Shenice wearing her clothes and makeup. Kat shouts at Shenice to take the clothes off, and Shenice flinches thinking Kat is going to hit her. The next day, Shenice is caught trying to steal cigarettes from the local shop, which Kat chastises a drunken Martina for. Martina calls her daughter useless before going to bed, and Shenice tells Kat and Alfie that Martina says things she does not mean when she is drunk. The next day, Martina tells Kat that she is back with her boyfriend and she will get some money so she and Shenice can move out. Kat and Alfie organise a birthday party for Shenice as Martina has forgotten and Shenice takes a disliking to Tiffany Butcher (Maisie Smith) as they are wearing the same outfit. Shenice has to leave halfway through the party as Martina finds a place to live, and they move out, leaving Kat and Alfie distraught.

Kat and Alfie holiday in Spain and return with Shenice. Shenice and Tiffany become friends again but Shenice grows bored as Kat cannot take her and Tiffany out anywhere because of Kat's baby son Tommy. Shenice bonds with Kat's relative Jean Slater (Gillian Wright) after helping her plant some window boxes. When Shenice is due to go back to Spain, she begs to stay in Walford and Alfie agrees. Shenice is then enrolled at Walford Primary School. Martina allows Shenice to spend Christmas with Kat and Alfie. When Jean is questioned for benefit fraud, it sparks off another bipolar episode. This results in Jean believing that Shenice is an angel sent from her daughter Stacey Branning (Lacey Turner). Jean tries to take Shenice ice skating whilst dressed in pyjamas. Shenice manages to escape and runs back to The Queen Vic to alert Kat and Alfie. Jean's mental health improves, and though Shenice is wary of her for a time, she allows Jean to become her honorary grandma. Shenice goes to visit Martina in Spain, and on 7 September 2012 Kat reveals to Alfie that she is not coming back.

=== Development ===
Harvey is the real-life sister of Lacey Turner, who played Stacey Slater, and first appears on screen on 28 February 2011. Producers were unaware that Harvey and Turner were related until after the casting was made. Executive producer Bryan Kirkwood explained: "I sat down and watched a tape of a very talented young girl and it was only after we decided to cast [Harvey] that I was told [she] was [Turner]'s sister. [Harvey] got the role entirely on her own merits." In April 2011 it was announced that Harvey would be reprising the role. She made her return on 1 August 2011.

In July 2012, Harvey was nominated in the Best Young Actor category at the 2012 Inside Soap awards for her portrayal of Shenice.

== Ashley Chubb ==
Ashley Chubb
- EastEnders character
- Portrayed by: Colin Mace
- First appearance: Episode 4186; 31 March 2011
- Last appearance: Episode 4222; 2 June 2011
- Introduced by: Bryan Kirkwood
In-universe information
- Sons: Fatboy

Ashley Chubb, played by Colin Mace, is the father of established character Fatboy (Ricky Norwood). He is mentioned in the episode broadcast on 14 March 2011 when Fatboy says his parents have split up because Ashley has lost his job. Ashley arrives in Walford two weeks later, needing a place to stay. Fatboy invites him to stay with his friend, Mercy Olubunmi (Bunmi Mojekwu), and her grandmother, Grace Olubunmi (Ellen Thomas), but has to sneak him in so Grace does not find out. Ashley then rents a room at the local bed and breakfast, run by Kim Fox (Tameka Empson). He asks Fatboy for money, saying he has a job interview out of town but spends it on alcohol, telling Kim that he has done a one-off job for a friend. Fatboy discovers that Ashley is simply drinking away the money he lent him, and Kim leaves, telling Ashley not to stress about the rent. Fatboy tells Ashley that he is in love with Mercy but she has a boyfriend, so to help Fatboy, he reports Mercy to the border agency for having an expired visa, which Fatboy told him about. Ashley then leaves Walford and two days later the UK Border Agency talk to Mercy and deport her. Before she leaves, Fatboy proposes.

It was announced on 23 January 2011 that EastEnders producers were planning to expand Fatboy's family due to his popularity, and were in the process of casting his father. The part was cast to Mace, who filmed five episodes. Ashley is said to be a wheeler-dealer like his son. Ashley's arrival is reported to be due to difficulties in his personal life. An EastEnders insider is reported to have said "Fatboy has been a real hit with viewers and the bosses have decided that it's now time to bring in his dad so people can see what Fatboy is really all about." Ashley has been described as "dishevelled". Although Ashley only makes a guest appearance, Norwood expressed a hope for the character to return so the relationship between father and son could be further explored, adding, "There's great chemistry between Ashley and Fatboy". Ashley appeared in episodes between 31 March and 21 April 2011. He returned on 31 May 2011.

== Lydia Simmonds ==
Lydia Simmonds, initially played by Margaret Tyzack and then by Heather Chasen, is the maternal grandmother of Ricky (Sid Owen) and Janine Butcher (Charlie Brooks). She made her first appearance on 5 April 2011. She left the series on 13 June 2011. Described as twisted, manipulative, damaged and "[a] lady of class and dignity", Lydia's backstory states that she loved her daughter June but hated the man June married, Frank Butcher (Mike Reid), so she grew old alone and lived a life of solitude. Lydia and Janine were estranged for years and Janine is shocked to have her grandmother back in her life. The character and casting were announced on 15 February 2011, and of her casting, Tyzack said "I am delighted to be joining a great British tradition and a fine company of actors", and Executive Producer Bryan Kirkwood said: "What a coup to have Margaret Tyzack starring in EastEnders. She is an actress of incredible class and talent. Lydia has endless possibilities as a character, and I can't wait to see Janine meet her match."

== Cora Cross ==
Cora Cross, played by Ann Mitchell, is the mother of Tanya Branning (Jo Joyner) and Rainie Cross (Tanya Franks). Cora initially appeared from 11 to 15 April 2011, and returned as a regular character on 28 July. Cora and her casting were announced on 21 March 2011, when she was described as having "a brash, outspoken attitude and does not care who she offends. She also quickly puts Tanya under scrutiny, believing that success has turned her into a snob". It was said that she secretly wants to heal the rift between Tanya and Rainie. She has also been described as a "bolshie battleaxe". Mitchell said of her casting "As a lifelong fan of EastEnders, I am thrilled to join the cast. I am a great fan of June Brown's [who plays Dot Branning] and am looking forward to sharing some scenes with her." Cora initially appeared from 11 to 15 April 2011. On 31 May 2011, it was confirmed that Cora would be returning to EastEnders as a regular character. Kirkwood said, "We all love Cora here—actress Ann Mitchell could be one of the Walford greats. She'll be returning late in the summer and is here to stay." Kirkwood added that he was keen to establish the Cross women.

Daniel Kilkelly from Digital Spy said, "During her brief stay on Albert Square, Cora quickly became known for her brash attitude and outspoken ways." Kate White of Inside Soap praised the character saying "All hail the new queen of soap – fabulous Cora is everything the discerning viewer could ever want." White added she could watch Mitchell acting "her socks off" all day long.

== Martin ==
Martin
- EastEnders character
- Portrayed by: Alasdair Harvey
- First appearance: Episode 4201; 26 April 2011
- Last appearance: Episode 4205; 3 May 2011
- Introduced by: Bryan Kirkwood
In-universe information
- Occupation: Bus driver

Martin, played by Alasdair Harvey, is a love interest for Jane Beale (Laurie Brett), who appears between 26 April and 3 May 2011. He first appears when he is seen sitting at the bar of The Queen Victoria public house and Jane asks him to join her pub quiz team. Afterwards, Martin asks Jane to invite him next time. Martin passes his number to Jane via her brother Christian Clarke (John Partridge), asking her to call him. On Jane's 40th birthday, he turns up at the pub and goes over to Jane. They both lie about their lives and jobs, but as they are about to kiss, Martin says he cannot keep lying as he likes Jane too much, and says he's divorced with a child and lives in a pokey flat. Jane also tells the truth and stops Martin leaving, saying her house is not pokey and they can go there. They kiss as they enter the house but are surprised by Jane's husband Ian Beale (Adam Woodyatt) and his son Bobby (Alex Francis), throwing her a surprise dinner. The next day, Jane tries to end their brief relationship, but he kisses her, which Ian sees through the window, though Jane dumps him.

The Daily Star reported that Jane will have a one-night stand with Martin and viewers would be left wondering if she would confess to her husband, Ian. However, an EastEnders source told Digital Spy, "It doesn't go as far as a one-night stand, but Jane is flattered by the attention, they exchange phone numbers, there's some flirting and a couple of kisses." Martin has been described as a "hunk".

== Marta Demboski ==
Marta Demboski
- EastEnders character
- Portrayed by: Magdalena Kurek
- First appearance: Episode 4207; 6 May 2011
- Last appearance: Episode 4217; 24 May 2011
- Introduced by: Bryan Kirkwood
In-universe information
- Occupation: Carer

Marta Demboski, played by Magdalena Kurek, is a Polish carer interviewed and subsequently hired by Dot Branning (June Brown), who appears from 6 to 24 May 2011. When she starts working, Dot is strict and wants everything done a certain way. Marta tells Dot's friend Edward Bishop (Frank Barrie) that nothing she does is right in Dot's eyes. Dot later finds out that Marta is working nights as well, and Marta explains that her husband drinks and lost his job. She begs Dot not to tell the agency, and Dot allows her to continue working for her. When Marta returns a week later, Dot says she does not need any help and makes Marta look after her husband, Jim Branning (John Bardon), but Marta protests that that is not her job. The following day, Marta arrives late, annoying Dot. While Dot is looking through her purse, she finds a £10 note which she drops on the floor. She leaves the room, but comes back having lost the cash and accuses Marta of stealing it, thinking she put it on the table; Marta is fired by Dot. Dot later finds the money on the floor and regrets sacking Marta.

After Marta was seen smoking an electronic cigarette, it was reported that some viewers who smoked had switched from real cigarettes. The electronic cigarettes were supplied by E-Lites, and Adrian Everett, one of the company's founders and directors, said: "[W]e were delighted to be asked to supply E-Lites to the makers of EastEnders as part of a new storyline. The fact that electronic cigarettes were featured in an everyday scene is a fantastic example of how our products are being accepted by the wider population. More people are becoming aware of E-Lites every day and this is yet another big step forward."

== Jimmie Broome ==
Jimmie Broome
- EastEnders character
- Portrayed by: Samuel James
- Duration: 2011–2012, 2017
- First appearance: Episode 4213; 17 May 2011
- Last appearance: Episode 5491; 16 May 2017
- Introduced by: Bryan Kirkwood (2011); Sean O'Connor (2017)
In-universe information
- Occupation: Lawyer

Jimmie Broome, played by Samuel James, is Phil Mitchell's (Steve McFadden) lawyer. He appeared between 17 May 2011 and 13 December 2012, before returning on 12 May 2017.

He first appears after being hired by Phil to represent Jane Beale (Laurie Brett) in her divorce hearing with Ian Beale (Adam Woodyatt). In November, he is hired again to help Phil's cousin Roxy Mitchell (Rita Simons) regain custody of her daughter Amy Mitchell (Amelie Conway) from the father, Jack Branning (Scott Maslen). He suggests that Roxy dig up as much dirt on Jack and his family as she can. Roxy does this, deciding to use Jack's brother Derek Branning's (Jamie Foreman) criminal past against Jack, as Derek is staying with him, but this fails and a court grants custody to Jack. Phil then sacks Jimmie, though his relative Billy Mitchell (Perry Fenwick) asks Jimmie for advice on his pregnant granddaughter, Lola Pearce (Danielle Harold), whose baby could be taken into care once it is born. Jimmie advises Billy to apply for a Special Guardianship Order, which would grant him legal responsibility for the child. He returns on 9 February 2012 at Amy's custody case, after which Roxy gains custody of her. On 23 October 2012, apparently re-hired, Jimmie speaks to Phil about gaining custody of Lola's baby Lexi Pearce, as she has been taken into care and is actually Phil's granddaughter. Jimmie says that Phil would have a better chance of gaining custody if he is in a stable relationship. Jimmie later tells Phil that his son Ben's (Joshua Pascoe) murder charge has been dropped and he will be tried for manslaughter, and that Ben has agreed to a visit from Phil. When Jimmie advises Phil that he needs to find a way to prove to the court that he has a good support network for Lexi, Phil secretly orders Jimmie to put Sharon's name down on the application as his fiancée. Jimmie helps Phil to become Lexi's foster father, while Lola is allowed three access visits a week.

In 2017, Jack hires Jimmie when Charlie Cotton (Declan Bennett), father of Matthew Mitchell Cotton, who is the son of Jack's deceased wife, Ronnie Branning (Samantha Womack), wants residence of Matthew.

== Eddie Moon ==
Eddie Moon, played by David Essex, is the father of Michael Moon (Steve John Shepherd), Tyler Moon (Tony Discipline) and Anthony Moon (Matt Lapinskas). On 24 January 2011, it was announced that Essex had been cast in the role of Eddie, Michael's father. It was stated that Eddie's other children would arrive after him, and his "fractured" relationship with Michael would be explored. Eddie's sons, Tyler and Anthony, were announced on 10 May 2011, and Kirkwood said that the Moon family were "on their way to becoming an established family in the Square." Kirkwood later said, "[Essex] is a legend in his own right. I can't wait for the audience reaction when he hits the screens in a few weeks. I'm hoping viewers come to love him."

Eddie is described as a "loveable rogue" who is cheeky, likeable and charismatic. The EastEnders website says he has a dark past that he is trying to escape, and calls him a polite gentleman who makes friends for life, and is popular with the ladies. Essex said that when Eddie was younger, he would have been a "mirror image" of Michael, but has since become more philosophical, and is less hot headed than Michael. Essex told Digital Spy that Eddie is "a strong character", who is an ex-boxer. Essex said Eddie's chequered past would unfold and opined that "He's not a bad guy". He also explained that Eddie is separated from his wife, and that Tyler and Anthony are Michael's half brothers. Eddie works as an antiques dealer and also has a daughter, Francesca, referred to as Frankie in the series.

== Shameem ==
Shameem
- EastEnders character
- Portrayed by: Seeta Indrani
- First appearance: Episode 4233; 21 June 2011
- Last appearance: Episode 4234; 23 June 2011
- Introduced by: Bryan Kirkwood
In-universe information
- Nieces: Afia Masood

Shameem, played by Seeta Indrani, is the sister-in-law of Yusef Khan (Ace Bhatti) and aunt of Afia Khan (Meryl Fernandes). She appears on 21 and 23 June 2011.

She appears when she arrives for Afia's mehndi to Tamwar Masood (Himesh Patel). She arrives before the mehndi to help out, at Kim Fox's (Tameka Empson) bed and breakfast. Yusef introduces her to everyone, and Shameem takes an instant dislike to Kim and her sister, Denise Fox (Diane Parish). Shameem is a witty and confident woman who is willing to drink in moderation despite her religion however she is also shown to be haughty and arrogant with a vicious tongue. She insults Denise in her own home and accuses her of wanting seduce Yusef. She is also annoyed at Afia for not doing a proper Muslim mehndi ceremony, though later agrees to it. She attends the mehndi and whilst she is outside, she overhears Yusef and his ex-wife Zainab Masood (Nina Wadia) talking about their history. She suspects they are having an affair, and tells all the guests at the mehndi, leaving everyone shocked. When Zainab tries to prove that she is not having an affair, her husband, Masood Ahmed (Nitin Ganatra) punches Yusef.

When it was reported that Shameem would suspect that Yusef and Zainab are having an affair, a source said, "The whole day turns into a disaster. When Shameem sees Yusef and Zainab together she automatically thinks they're having an affair. Everyone struggles to come to terms with what they have just heard. Afia is devastated and demands answers from her dad Yusef. He assures her it is all lies before leaving to find Zainab. It's one hell of a fall-out."

== Tyler Moon ==
Tyler Moon, played by Tony Discipline, is the son of Eddie Moon (David Essex), half brother of Michael Moon (Steve John Shepherd), brother of Anthony Moon (Matt Lapinskas) and cousin of Alfie Moon (Shane Richie). The character was announced on 10 May 2011, along with Anthony, and made his first appearance on 27 June 2011. Discipline heard about the part in November 2010 from his agent, so decided to audition and returned two weeks later for a workshop. At the workshop, there were six actors shortlisted to play Tyler and six shortlisted to play Anthony. The actors were paired off, and Discipline was paired with Lapinskas. A month later, Discipline attended a screen test, and after a further screen test, he found out he had got the part. The younger of the brothers, Tyler was described as having a short fuse and "quick to use his fist to sort things out", and the two new brothers are said to be "a couple of likely lads who are more than likely to cause a stir in Albert Square." Discipline described Tyler as "very sparky and very charismatic! He can be quick to snap at certain people sometimes if they get on the wrong side of him, but he's a lovely guy. He's also very flirty when it comes to the women! He's a bit of a chap to say the least! It's not because he's seedy or he's horrible or anything like that—he genuinely enjoys chatting to women and chasing them. Even if they turned him down, it's all part of the chase and that's fun for Tyler. You can expect a lot of flirting, a lot of girls and maybe some arguments. We shall see!" Daniel Kilkelly from Digital Spy added that the character has a lot of energy.

== Norman Simmonds ==
Norman Simmonds
- EastEnders character
- Portrayed by: George Layton
- Duration: 2011–2012
- First appearance: Episode 4241; 5 July 2011
- Last appearance: Episode 4350; 2 January 2012
- Introduced by: Bryan Kirkwood
In-universe information
- Occupation: Loan dealer
- Mother: Lydia Simmonds
- Sisters: June Butcher
- Nephews: Ricky Butcher
- Nieces: Janine Butcher; Diane Butcher; Clare Butcher
- Other relatives: Liam Butcher; Tiffany Butcher; Scarlett Butcher

Norman Simmonds, played by George Layton, is the estranged son of Lydia Simmonds (Heather Chasen). He is first mentioned in the episode broadcast on 9 June, when Lydia calls him a waste of space and says he will get nothing in her will. He arrives in Walford on 5 July, as an "unexpected guest" at his mother's funeral. Norman left EastEnders on 27 October 2011. Norman returned for a single episode on 2 January 2012.

Norman goes to Pat Evans' (Pam St Clement) house and they recognise each other, and he mentions that he is widowed again, having been married five times. Norman's niece, Janine Malloy (Charlie Brooks) is angry with him because he never bothered with his mother while she was alive. A week later, Pat calls him and asks him to contest the will against Janine who is the sole beneficiary. The next day, Norman phones up Pat, and asks her to visit him in hospital after he stepped on a rake. Pat tries to persuade Norman not to contest the will after all, and he later agrees. It is clear that Norman likes Pat, but she is oblivious to this. Jean Slater (Gillian Wright) takes a liking to Norman and asks him to dress as a Pearly King to help with her campaign to stop the community centre closing. Jean hopes that she can be his Pearly Queen, but he asks Pat to do it instead, and she reluctantly agrees.

Norman asks Pat out but she rejects him, while Jean's liking of Norman intensifies. Jean agrees to go to a skiffle event with him. However, she misunderstands, as he is actually giving her both tickets and not going with her. Jean's relative Kat Moon (Jessie Wallace) confronts Norman for playing games but he insists he was never planning to go with Jean. This causes an argument between Kat, Pat and Janine, and Janine tells Norman that Pat used to be a prostitute. Norman tells Janine he is ashamed to be related to her. Jean soon becomes obsessed with Norman, constantly sending him text messages. She invites him to dinner, but he says no, saying he would not want to make a habit of it. Jean then mistakenly thinks Norman wants to live with her. He is shocked at this, and asks Kat's husband Alfie (Shane Richie) for help. Alfie makes things worse though, so Norman is forced to tell Jean that they should just be friends, as he feels she is too good for him.

When Pat discovers that her son, Simon Wicks (Nick Berry), who lives in New Zealand, is going to lose his home, she fails to get a loan because of her age. Norman offers to help and organises a loan for her. After speaking to her great-grandson Liam Butcher (James Forde), Pat decides she likes Norman and they kiss, she also asks him to stay. However, the next day Norman tells Patrick Trueman (Rudolph Walker) that he regularly earns commission for organising loans for people. Patrick then warns Pat about this, and once Pat finds out that the terms of the loan mean if she misses a payment she could lose her house, she rejects Norman, tells him to leave and says she never wants to see him again.

In January 2012, Norman returns to Walford, saying he has raised enough money to help Pat with the loan. However, Pat has since died from pancreatic cancer, so he goes to the Butchers' house to pay his respects.

Digital Spy reported that "sparks fly" when Norman runs into Pat Evans and he develops a soft spot for her. The character and casting were announced on 12 June 2011. Norman is described as "hapless, clumsy and unlucky in life." Of his casting, Layton said "I am thrilled to be joining such a wonderful cast and crew—Norman is a great part and I'm excited to play him. I can't wait to get stuck into life in Albert Square—and hopefully the odd tipple or three in the Queen Vic!"

== Lola Pearce ==
Lola Pearce, played by Danielle Harold, is the 15-year-old granddaughter of Billy Mitchell (Perry Fenwick) and Julie Perkins (Cathy Murphy). The character of Lola was announced on 7 June 2011 and she was created as an extension of the established Mitchell family. As she meets her grandparents for the first time, Lola quickly forms a bond with them as she has been deserted by everyone else in her life. Eighteen-year-old Harold was cast in the role and she said "I am so excited to be joining EastEnders. I have watched the show all my life and I never thought that one day I could be in Albert Square. It feels strange to be walking round Walford with people I have grown up watching—I still have to pinch myself.". EastEnders is Harold's first acting job and she was given the role following her first audition, which shocked her. Harold told Daybreak, "It was my first audition that I'd ever had, so I was really nervous and I was thinking, 'I'm never going to get it – I'm just going to have fun while I'm there'. I was just shocked to even get the casting for it, so I was over the moon when I actually got the part." Harold previously starred in Jamie Oliver's Channel 4 reality show Jamie's Dream School and got into an acting school because of the show. Harold said she had always wanted to be an actress and was grateful to be given a great character in Lola. Lola made her first appearance on 12 July 2011.

== Anthony Moon ==
Anthony Moon, played by Matt Lapinskas, is the son of Eddie Moon (David Essex), half brother of Michael Moon (Steve John Shepherd), brother of Tyler Moon (Tony Discipline), and cousin of Alfie Moon (Shane Richie). The character made his first appearance in the episode broadcast on 25 July 2011. Anthony, along with brother Tyler, were both announced as new characters in May 2011 being played by Lapinskas and Discipline respectively, though Tyler made his debut at an earlier date. Described as someone who "will rely on his brains and natural wit to find a more sensitive solution to any conflict", it is shown that Anthony has a gambling problem before his arrival, which is later a focus of a storyline. Lapinskas said of his relationship with half brother Michael that Anthony "idolises" him and that Michael "corrupted" Anthony. When Eddie leaves, Anthony takes charge of his antiques business.

== Lee ==
Lee
- EastEnders character
- Portrayed by: Mitchell Hunt
- First appearance: Episode 4265; 15 August 2011
- Last appearance: Episode 4273; 29 August 2011
- Introduced by: Bryan Kirkwood

Lee, played by Mitchell Hunt, is a friend of Rob Grayson (Jody Latham), who lures his ex, Whitney Dean (Shona McGarty), back into Rob's hands. He appears between 15 August and 29 August 2011.

Lee approaches Whitney in Walford's café, where she refuses to let him pay for her. Later, he apologises and says he will go for a drink with her if he buys something from her market stall. She calls him a pervert and tells him to leave. He later talks to her again and asks for her phone number. Whitney is eventually convinced to do so. Lee takes Whitney bowling, and afterwards they kiss. When Whitney texts Lee that she wants to meet again, it is revealed that Lee is a friend of Rob, who previously forced Whitney into prostitution, and Lee hands his phone to Rob. After Rob is killed in a fight with Whitney's brother Ryan Malloy (Neil McDermott), Lee visits Whitney and tells her not to get his name involved as police have visited him. She tells him to leave, deliberately causing a scene, and he leaves.

Speaking of his time on EastEnders, Hunt said in an interview, "It was great. It was my first job out of drama school, as I only finished a few weeks before. I had to jump straight into it, but everyone was so nice. The cast and crew really are just like one big family. Everything moves so fast. There are four cameras on you at any one time, so there is no room for error." Hunt also hoped for a return for Lee, saying, "Well, my character doesn't die, so there's always hope!"

== Rose Cotton ==
Rose Cotton
- EastEnders character
- Portrayed by: Polly Perkins
- Duration: 2011–2012
- First appearance: Episode 4269; 22 August 2011
- Last appearance: Episode 4464; 19 July 2012
- Introduced by: Bryan Kirkwood
In-universe information
- Occupation: Receptionist; Cleaner
- Mother: Martha Taylor
- Brothers: Gerry Colwell; Tim Taylor
- Half-sisters: Dot Cotton
- Husband: Charlie Cotton (void)
- Sons: Andrew Cotton
- Stepsons: Nick Cotton
- Nephews: Nick Cotton

Rose Cotton, played by Polly Perkins, is the estranged half-sister of Dot Branning (June Brown). On 18 May 2012, Daniel Kilkelly of Digital Spy confirmed Perkins was leaving EastEnders. Rose's last episode was on 19 July 2012.

She is first seen when Dot goes to visit her in Southend-on-Sea where she lives, as she has decided to make amends before she dies. Dot sees Rose in a bar, drinking and flirting with a group of men, and leaves without speaking to her. She later follows her to an address, and Rose lies that she is well off and her husband has died. Dot leaves but returns when she realises she has left something behind. She finds that the dead man is alive and Rose has lied about everything. Dot goes to her actual home and Rose admits she did not want Dot to think bad of her. Dot tells Rose she may not have long to live and did not want to die before making amends. They start to bond, and Dot meets Rose's son Andrew (Ricky Grover), and there is animosity between mother and son. Before Dot is due to leave, Rose asks to spend some more time with her. Dot says as they are both lonely, Rose should live with her in Walford, and Rose agrees. Andrew drives them there but reveals his last name is Cotton, and Rose is forced to admit that Andrew's father is Dot's first husband Charlie Cotton (Christopher Hancock), who had a bigamous marriage with Rose. Dot kicks Rose out but she later returns, saying she does not want to lose her sister again.

Rose moves in and Dot urges her to earn money. When Dot gossips to her about Jean Slater (Gillian Wright) and her family, Rose uses this information to make Jean think she is psychic, and Jean pays her for her services. She then gets a trial working for Dr. Yusef Khan (Ace Bhatti) as his receptionist. She gets the job and appears to enjoy it, although her constant pining over Yusef appears to irritate him somewhat. Rose reveals to Dot that she is behind with the paperwork at the surgery while Yusef has been away. Dot helps Rose sort through her workload, but they discover that Rose has misplaced some test results for a patient who has since died. Rose fears her oversight resulted in the patient's death, but Reverend Stevens (Michael Keating) tells her the patient died of a bee sting. A relieved Rose then flirts with Reverend Stevens, much to the chagrin of Dot. A few days later, Dot reveals Rose's shady past to Reverend Stevens. However, the Reverend is intrigued, and he and Rose share a drink at The Queen Victoria public house, as he wants to know more about her life. Rose brings alcohol to a church social event, which Dot is against, but Reverend Stevens thanks Dot for making it the best so far. Rose and Reverend Stevens grow closer at the event, resulting in him asking for Dot's blessing to date Rose. Rose later has sex with Patrick Trueman (Rudolph Walker) upsetting Reverend Stevens. Cora finds this funny but Dot kicks Cora out for laughing. Rose later apologises to Dot for embarrassing her and forgives Dot for the things she said, however, Dot asks Rose to move back to Southend. Dot also discovers Rose's passport which reveals Rose had remarried again and had the surname of Beauchamp. When Dot confronts her, Rose reveals that the marriage was abusive. Dot then allows Rose to move back in with her. Rose later does some card readings with Jean, Kim Fox (Tameka Empson) and Denise Fox (Diane Parish). In December 2011 Andrew comes back to Walford in December, and promises to stay for Christmas, much to the delight of Rose and Dot.

In January 2012, Abi Branning (Lorna Fitzgerald) finds a love note in the charity shop and finds out the book the note was in belongs to her maternal grandmother, Cora Cross (Ann Mitchell). However, Abi sees Rose reading the same note, leaving Abi confused. Cora then discovers the letter Rose is reading and asks why is anybody writing to her, leaving the two ladies to have an argument. When Rose receives more love letters, Dot and Cora rummage through her things to try and discover who the mystery man is. They are horrified when they learn he is serving a life sentence in prison, although Rose seems unfazed by this. Dot then attempts to put a stop to it by writing on Rose's behalf, but reveals her real name and address, not realising that Rose used a false name and a PO Box address.

Andrew announces that he is to marry Heather Trott (Cheryl Fergison). Rose is unhappy at Andrew's choice of bride, and tries to undermine Heather. Heather eventually stands up to Rose, saying she is bullying her, and Rose later realises that she is just jealous and does not want to lose her son. Rose then helps dot arrange the wedding. However, on Heather's hen party, Rose gets drunk and leaves early. At home, she tries on Heather's wedding dress. Andrew discovers her, gets angry and rips the dress. It is also revealed that Andrew has spent time in prison for assaulting Rose's abusive husband. Dot and Rose hastily repair Heather's wedding dress on the night before the wedding, but are distraught when they learn that Heather has been murdered. The police arrest Andrew, and Patrick finds the burnt remains of a hoodie worn by members of Andrew's stag-party. Desperate to prove Andrew's innocence, Rose, Dot and Cora break into the R&R nightclub where he worked and find Andrew's hoodie, which they hand to the police. Andrew is released from custody. In May 2012, Dot leaves to spend a few months with her granddaughter Dotty (Molly Conlin). Rose then becomes lonely, and is jealous of the friendship between Cora and Patrick. Andrew calls Dot, who invites Rose to stay with her, and Rose leaves Walford.

In 2022 after Dot's death, Rose is mentioned by Sonia Fowler (Natalie Cassidy) as not being able to attend the funeral as she and Andrew are stuck on a cruise.

=== Development ===
The casting of Perkins in the role was announced on 27 May 2011 and the character first appeared on screen on 22 August 2011. She is described as "flighty, fun and not one to age gracefully". Rose and Dot have been estranged for most of their lives, since Rose had an affair with Dot's first husband, Charlie Cotton. Dot decides to track Rose down after suffering a bout of hypochondria, feeling it is time to put things right, however, Rose is not pleased to see Dot again after so many years. Perkins said of her casting, "I am thrilled to be joining the cast of EastEnders, the show is a real British institution with an extraordinary creative team. I'm really looking forward to working with June again, who I have been friends with for over 30 years." Perkins and Brown were pictured filming scenes on a beach in Thorpe Bay in Essex. A spokesperson said "All I'll say is we are filming some big episodes, which we plan to broadcast later this summer. It's not our policy to comment on episodes like this so early."

== Andrew Cotton ==
Andrew Cotton
- EastEnders character
- Portrayed by: Ricky Grover
- Duration: 2011–2012
- First appearance: Episode 4269; 22 August 2011
- Last appearance: Episode 4485; 24 August 2012
- Introduced by: Bryan Kirkwood
In-universe information
- Occupation: Doorman; Self-employed food vendor
- Father: Charlie Cotton
- Mother: Rose Cotton
- Stepmother: Dot Cotton
- Half-brothers: Nick Cotton; Tom "Rocky" Cotton
- Aunts: Dot Cotton
- Nephews: Ashley Cotton; Charlie Cotton
- Nieces: Dotty Cotton
- Other relatives: Matthew Mitchell Cotton; Reiss Colwell; Julia Fowler

Andrew Cotton, played by Ricky Grover, is a love interest for Heather Trott (Cheryl Fergison) who first appears on 22 August 2011 until 26 August. He returned on 13 December. He departed on 24 August 2012.

Andrew is first seen when Heather and her friend Shirley Carter (Linda Henry) go to a 1980s festival in Southend-on-Sea, though Heather has not told Shirley it is for couples. Shirley walks out but when she returns, it is too late for them to go in but Andrew, who is working on the door, lets them in anyway. Heather tells Andrew that she and Shirley are lesbians as the event is for couples, but he thinks Heather is lying, and she admits it. When Andrew talks to Shirley, she says Heather is not interested and Heather thinks Andrew is more interested in Shirley. Eventually, Shirley tells Heather that Andrew likes her, but did not tell her in case it was purely for a bet. This upsets Heather, who tells Andrew the bet is off. Heather soon realises she was wrong and meets Andrew in the restaurant of the hotel where she is staying. Heather's friend Dot Branning (June Brown) arrives with her half sister Rose Cotton (Polly Perkins) and it is revealed that Andrew is Rose's son and they do not get on. Andrew and Rose trade insults at the table and he and Heather decide to leave. Heather tells Andrew he should not speak to his mother that way and decides to leave. Andrew finds out Rose has decided to live with Dot and will be left on his own. He drives them to Walford and finds Heather, and she says she will find him next time she is in Southend. He tells her his name as Andrew Cotton, revealing to Dot that his father is her first husband Charlie Cotton (Christopher Hancock), and that he had a third bigamous marriage. Andrew then returns to Southend.

Andrew returns to Walford in December and promises to stay for Christmas, much to Rose and Dot's delight. He meets Heather again, and vows to her that he will make up for his past mistakes with her. Heather initially rejects him, but then they share a kiss. He later asks to spend Christmas with her, and she agrees. Andrew starts working as a doorman at the R&R nightclub. Heather is upset when he chooses to work instead of spending the night with her. Andrew leaves Heather several messages, explaining he was scared and he will wait in the café until she arrives. However, he is asked to leave because he is taking up a seat and he refuses. In his anger, he pushes a table over, which Heather witnesses. She forgives him, and the couple soon admit their love for each other. They attend a dance class with Kim Fox (Tameka Empson) and Heather is impressed with Andrew's dance moves. He also picks up a poster about gastric band surgery, which Rose finds and confronts Heather about. He tells Heather he is fixing Dot's tap but Heather thinks he is having the surgery, but he reveals he was looking for an engagement ring. He proposes and Heather accepts and they have sex for the first time. Andrew soon notices that Heather spends more time with Shirley than with him, and gets angry with Heather. Heather and Andrew settle their differences and spend more time together.

At Heather's hen night, Andrew's temper emerges again when he almost hits Shirley and it is revealed that Andrew went to prison for assaulting Rose's husband. Heather stays with Andrew as he explains that Rose's husband regularly abused her. Sick of the interference in their wedding, Andrew suggests to Heather that they elope. Heather is unsure, so he gives her two train tickets and tells her to meet him at The Queen Victoria public house by 6 pm if she wants to elope with him. Heather does not arrive, so Andrew gets drunk, leaves the pub and considers leaving Walford. He is persuaded to stay by a homeless man, Gerry (Michael Elliott), and returns to Heather's flat, only to find that Heather has been murdered. Andrew is arrested by the police, as he doesn't have an alibi for where he was when Heather died and they suspect him as he cannot prove that a tramp stole Heather's money from him. However, he is eventually released without charge. Shirley confronts Andrew and publicly accuses him of murdering Heather. However, when it is suggested that Andrew should leave Walford, he declares that he plans to stay. Dot doubts Andrew's innocence but when Andrew opens up to Dot about his feelings for Heather, Dot changes her mind. This leads to Shirley banning Andrew and Dot from Heather's funeral. However, Shirley later finds the train tickets that Andrew gave Heather the night she died and realises he is innocent. She later admits that she wanted him to be the killer as she was jealous and the pair agree to unite to find Heather's real killer. Dot and Rose eventually leave Walford, leaving Andrew with no family there. Heather's killer is eventually revealed to be Ben Mitchell (Joshua Pascoe) after he confesses to the police. When Jay Mitchell (Jamie Borthwick) is released on bail charged with perverting the course of justice for protecting Ben, Andrew accuses Shirley of protecting them as they were living with her. When he sees Jay, he attacks him in The Queen Vic by pushing him onto a table. The next day, Andrew realises that he will never be able to move on as long as he stays in Walford because of the memories and decides to leave. In 2022, he cannot attend Dot's funeral as he is on a cruise with Rose.

=== Creation and development ===
In November 2011, executive producer Bryan Kirkwood told Inside Soap that Andrew would be returning to EastEnders to woo Heather. In March 2012, Grover said that Andrew will be staying with EastEnders, despite Heather's departure. Speaking to Inside Soap, Grover said: "EastEnders have asked me to stay on as a more regular character, so I'm hoping to be involved for another year or so." He added that it was a lovely compliment as Andrew was originally intended for four episodes only and that it was a shock to hear that Fergison would be leaving the show. Grover revealed in April 2012 that he initially turned down the role of Andrew up to five times, before being persuaded to accept the role. Grover said he was scared of being branded a "silly fat couple" as both Andrew and Heather are overweight. He said he spoke to Steve McFadden (who plays Phil Mitchell), who is a friend of his and he told Grover that he can play the role how he wants so eventually accepted it. Speaking about his introduction, Grover added that Heather and Andrew were "hitting it off" and it is like he and Fergison have been working together for years. Grover also added that when he is filming, he "makes it sound authentic".

Fergison commented on Heather feelings when Andrew proposes to her, saying that Heather "couldn't be happier". Fergison told All About Soap: "He tells Heather he has to go and fix Dot's leaky tap, but she discovers he's lying. Her mind goes into overdrive and she's convinced he must be involved in dodgy dealings. She's been let down so many times before, and her initial reaction is to fly off the handle. In the end, he proposes with a plastic washer from Dot's tap," she continued. "Heather's thrilled, though, and couldn't be happier – the ring could have been from a lucky-dip bag and she'd have still said yes. She can't believe her luck." Fergison also added that Heather and Andrew are likely to have a budget wedding if it goes ahead. She continued: "It will all be done on a shoestring, but they'll want it to look like the whole William-and-Kate affair," she said. "As for her dress, I'm sure with Mrs Branning and Mrs Cotton interfering, it could be anything from a lacy number to a meringue. Whatever they pick, it won't be very Heather-ish and it'll be completely out of her hands. She won't mind — as long as the family pull together to make it a special day, she'll be happy."

Fergison said that there will be tension between Andrew and Heather's best friend Shirley Carter, played by Linda Henry. In an interview with Inside Soap, Fergison commented: "Heather has put her trust in Andrew in a very short period of time. Recently she walked into the café to see Andrew turn over a table in anger, so she knows he has a temper. But Heather really wants things to work out. She's aware there are alarm bells ringing, and whereas in the past she would have totally ignored them, she's more wary these days. But when better things override that and he's her lovely Andrew again, it's all fine." Speaking about Shirley's take on the situation, she continued: "There has always been friction between Shirley and whichever man Heather gets involved with. I think she was even jealous of baby George when he was born. That means there'll be serious sparks as the friction between Andrew and Shirley grows. We're talking fire and brimstone! And that's going to bring out this other side of Andrew once more."

== Faith Olubunmi ==
Faith Olubunmi
- EastEnders character
- Portrayed by: Modupe Adeyeye
- First appearance: Episode 4282; 13 September 2011
- Last appearance: Episode 4286; 20 September 2011
- Introduced by: Bryan Kirkwood
- Spin-off appearances: EastEnders: E20 (2011)
In-universe information
- Sisters: Mercy Olubunmi
- Grandmothers: Grace Olubunmi

Faith Olubunmi, played by Modupe Adeyeye, is the younger sister of Mercy Olubunmi (Bunmi Mojekwu). Faith is one of three main characters in the third series of EastEnders spin-off EastEnders: E20, and the only one to appear in EastEnders as well. She appears in EastEnders from 13 September 2011, before appearing in the spin-off. Faith was sent to Nigeria by her grandmother Grace Olubunmi (Ellen Thomas) "to get back on the straight and narrow, but she is back and worse than ever!" She arrives in Walford to tell Mercy's husband Fatboy (Ricky Norwood) that she has had the marriage annulled and asks for his wedding ring so she can sell it. She stays with Grace and attends a party where she kisses several men. Faith later holds a party at Grace's house and she has sex with Fatboy but they are caught by Grace. The next day, when Faith returns home drunk, Grace slaps her and kicks her out of the house. In EastEnders: E20, she is unable to find anywhere to live so starts squatting with Donnie Lester (Samuell Benta) and Ava Bourne (Sophie Colquhoun). They attempt to feed themselves by stealing from local business. When there is no hot water, Faith has sex with Fatboy to get a hot shower. Faith is placed in emergency care by Grace, and the three discover that their squat is to become their hostel. While there, Faith and Donnie have sex, and Faith discovers that Donnie is illiterate but offers to help him learn to read. She is then rejected by both Donnie and Fatboy. She discovers that Ava was involved in an arson attack when she was younger and is using a new identity, and calls a newspaper to tell them this. Ava then tells Faith that she was raped by their keyworker, Richard. Donnie overhears this and Richard is arrested. Journalists arrive but Faith tells them she lied. She ends up soaking their new keyworker, Theresa. Faith distracts the press by wearing a bikini and confronting them on her doorstep, whilst Donnie and Ava seek out another entrance.

Faith is described as someone who can be "an incredible amount of fun and excitement, and she has a cheekiness that charms most people. But she's not nearly as bright as she thinks she is—she can sometimes be reckless and downright dangerous. When Faith runs into [E20 characters] Donnie and Ava, she sees it as her chance to cause even more mischief!" Faith also has a profile on Twitter. In September, Adeyeye told Digital Spy that she had finished filming for EastEnders.

== Craig Moon ==
Craig Moon
- EastEnders character
- Portrayed by: Elliot Rosen
- First appearance: Episode 4284; 16 September 2011
- Last appearance: Episode 4295; 6 October 2011
- Introduced by: Bryan Kirkwood
In-universe information
- Father: Eddie Moon
- Mother: Maggie Moon
- Brothers: Michael Moon
- Half-brothers: Anthony Moon; Tyler Moon
- Half-sisters: Francesca Moon
- Nephews: Tommy Moon
- Nieces: Scarlett Butcher
- Other relatives: Alfie Moon; Spencer Moon

Craig Moon, played by Elliot Rosen, is the long-lost brother of Michael Moon (Steve John Shepherd), and son of Eddie Moon (David Essex).

The character and casting was announced on 24 July 2011 and Craig first appeared on 16 September 2011. EastEnders worked closely with the Down's Syndrome Association whilst devising the storyline and were praised for "Presenting people with Down's Syndrome living successful lives." A spokesperson for the show added they were committed to raising issues such as Down's syndrome.

== Yasmin Masood ==
Yasmin Masood
- EastEnders character
- Duration: 2011–2012, 2014
- First appearance: Episode 4297; 10 October 2011
- Last appearance: Episode 4857; 19 May 2014
- Introduced by: Bryan Kirkwood (2011); Lorraine Newman (2012); Dominic Treadwell-Collins (2014)
In-universe information
- Father: Syed Masood
- Mother: Amira Masood
- Stepfather: Christian Clarke
- Grandfathers: Masood Ahmed; Qadim Shah
- Grandmothers: Zainab Masood
- Uncles: Tamwar Masood; Kamil Masood
- Aunts: Shabnam Masood
- First cousins: Jade Masood; Zaair Kazemi

Yasmin Masood is the daughter of Syed Masood (Marc Elliott) and Amira Masood (Preeya Kalidas). Yasmin is mentioned in two extra scenes available on BBC Online and BBC Red Button, called Amira's Secret, on 6 and 8 September 2011, when Amira reveals that no man will want her any more, as she has Yasmin. Yasmin appears in the second scene. Yasmin made her first appearance in EastEnders on 10 October 2011 and left the show on 12 November 2012. Yasmin made another one off appearance on 19 May 2014.

Amira leaves Walford after finding out Syed is having an affair with Christian Clarke (John Partridge), though she is carrying a baby, which he does not know about. When Amira returns to Walford over a year later, she meets Yusef Khan (Ace Bhatti), who believes she has come to discuss getting divorced. However, Amira reveals that she wants Syed to meet his daughter. Yusef tries to persuade her she is doing the wrong thing and that Syed will want custody of Yasmin. However, Amira goes to Syed and Christian's engagement party and tells Syed he has a daughter but she does not want Christian to have anything to do with Yasmin but Syed refuses to visit without Christian. However, he later meets Amira and Yasmin in the park. Amira tries to manipulate Syed into spending more time with her and Yasmin. Amira lies, saying that Yasmin has swallowed her ring, leading to Yasmin going for an unnecessary trip to the hospital. Yusef, trying to tear the Masood family apart, tells Christian that Syed may not be Yasmin's father so he and Christian get a paternity test done, taking a hair from each of them. However, Yusef, who is the local GP, swaps Syed's hair sample for one of his own. The test results then show that Syed is not Yasmin's father, causing consternation for those involved, though Yusef's falsification is subsequently exposed. When Amira leaves Walford, she leaves Yasmin with Syed and Christian.

When Christian enters Yasmin into a "beautiful baby" competition, Syed becomes angry and refers to Yasmin as his daughter, not his and Christian's, leading to an argument between them. Amira returns a few months later as she wants Yasmin to live with her and her new fiancé in Birmingham. Syed eventually agrees but when Christian finds out, he tries to stop her. Syed tells him that it is for the best and after agreeing to stay in touch, Amira and Yasmin leave after a tearful goodbye. However, Syed and Christian soon leave Walford to move nearer to Yasmin. In May 2014, Yasmin appears when Ian Beale (Adam Woodyatt) visits Christian at his home in Birmingham, following the death of his daughter Lucy (Hetti Bywater). Christian is looking after Yasmin whilst Syed is at work and Ian is affected by seeing Yasmin, telling Christian the sort of things to expect with having a daughter, and when she grew up.

=== Development ===
In August 2011, it was revealed that Amira had "[gone] ahead with the pregnancy and will come back with a little girl", and Kalidas promised a lot of drama. Kalidas said Amira still loves Syed after what he did, and that Amira wants to get back with Syed as she "doesn't want her daughter to grow up without knowing her father". She said that Amira cannot move on from Syed, as Yasmin is a constant reminder of him. Nina Wadia, who plays Syed's mother Zainab, said of the storyline, "I can't wait for Syed's baby to come. I think it will help Zainab and Syed get closer as she'll want her grandchild and it may make her feel like her son is a proper man." Elliott said in May 2010 that Amira being pregnant was "a real shocker".

== Mark Garland ==
Mark Garland
- EastEnders character
- Portrayed by: Chris Simmons
- First appearance: Episode 4300; 14 October 2011
- Last appearance: Episode 4301; 17 October 2011
- Introduced by: Bryan Kirkwood
In-universe information
- Occupation: Delivery driver

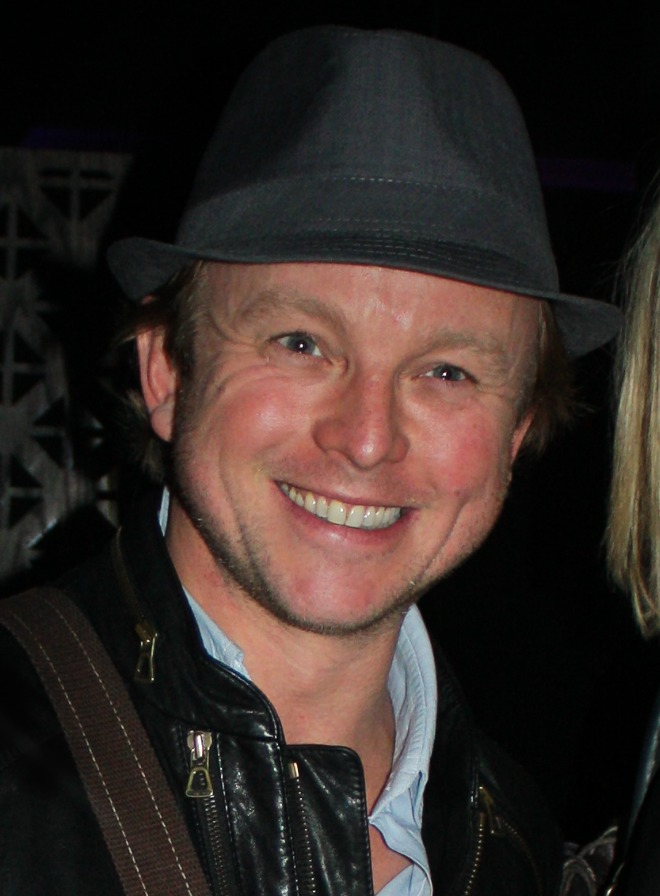
Chris Simmons portrays Mark.

Mark Garland, played by Chris Simmons, is a love interest for Kat Moon (Jessie Wallace). He first appears on 14 October 2011, when he is delivering alcohol to The Queen Victoria public house, of which Kat is a landlady. Mark tries to flirt with Kat but she tells him she is married. Mark later appears in the local nightclub, R&R, where he tries to chat up Kat, this time succeeding and they have a one-night stand. The next day, he returns at The Queen Vic and reminds her about the previous night and Kat refuses to serve him and makes Mark leave. The next day, Mark continues to phone Kat, but she rejects his calls.

It was reported that Kat faces temptation from Mark when she goes through marriage problems with her husband, Alfie Moon (Shane Richie), after he accuses her of having an affair. A source from EastEnders said, "A delivery driver who calls at The Queen Vic makes a big play for Kat—and soon she's facing serious temptation". Despite Kat and Mark flirting, it is unknown whether she will succumb to his charms. The Metro described him as "hunky" and "good looking". Inside Soap called him "creepy".

== Others ==
| Character | Date(s) | Actor | Circumstances |
|---|---|---|---|
| Midwife David | 3–4 January | Daniel Abelson | The midwife who attends when Alfie (Shane Richie) and Kat Moon (Jessie Wallace) visit who they believe is their dead son Tommy in hospital. |
| DI Sallinger | 4 January | Sam Barriscale | A police detective inspector who investigates into the sudden death of whom is believed to be Tommy Moon. |
| Taneshia | 4 January | Cecilia Noble | A midwife who visits Jack (Scott Maslen) and Ronnie Branning (Samantha Womack) to see who she believes is their baby James, though it is actually Tommy Moon as Ronnie secretly swapped the babies after James died suddenly. Taneshia is surprised to note that James's club foot has cleared up so quickly. |
| Mrs Dibley | 17 January | Jo-Anne Stockham | Tiffany Butcher's (Maisie Smith) school headteacher. Tiffany's parents Ricky (Sid Owen) and Bianca (Patsy Palmer) visit Mrs Dibley when Tiffany received a two-day suspension for getting into a fight. |
| Kendra Stanley | 24 January | Sharon D. Clarke | Connor Stanley's (Arinze Kene) mother. She visits Connor in hospital where Carol Jackson (Lindsey Coulson) is also visiting him, and they fight over Connor, with Kendra telling Carol to leave Connor alone. It is revealed that Kendra was a drug addict but is now clean. |
| Ms Underwood | 28 January | Joy Blakeman | Ben Mitchell's (Joshua Pascoe) head of year at school. She visits Jane Beale (Laurie Brett) and Shirley Carter (Linda Henry) to discuss Ben's truancy and bullying, and assumes they are in a relationship. Ms Underwood says this may be why Ben is being bullied but Shirley insists the problem is with the school. |
| David Priors | 1–24 February (3 episodes) | Daniel Coonan | A man in R&R nightclub who assumes Whitney Dean (Shona McGarty) and Janine Malloy (Charlie Brooks) are prostitutes. Knowing this, Janine tries to put an oblivious Whitney off him but Whitney refuses. Back at Whitney and Janine's flat, Janine asks David for £50 before he has sex with Whitney. The next day he and his friend Gary Dewsbury meet Whitney and Janine in R&R. When Whitney and David are left alone, he makes it clear he wants sex again but Whitney says she would rather go home alone. She steals his wallet while he is in the toilet, so David goes to the flat where Janine tells him if he calls the police, she will tell his wife, so he leaves, saying it is not over. Later, Janine arranges to meet him, but when he arrives he is expecting Whitney so refuses sex with Janine, offering her £10. She feels insulted and orders him out of her flat. |
| Dr Griffiths | 1 February | Michael Mueller | Ronnie Branning (Samantha Womack) visits Dr Griffiths when her baby (actually Tommy Moon) has a temperature. |
| Gary Dewsbury | 7 February | Daniel Husbands | David Priors' friend who meets Janine Malloy (Charlie Brooks) in R&R nightclub. When Janine says she wants to leave, he tries to kiss her so she knees him in the groin. He attacks her but she is saved by her brother Ricky Butcher (Sid Owen). |
| Jenny Ashwood | 14–17 February | Tracey Pretty | Michael Moon's (Steve John Shepherd) date, whom he met in Brighton. Roxy Mitchell (Rita Simons), who has been seeing Michael, is annoyed when she sees Michael with her, and later when she tries to make up with him, Jenny tells Roxy to leave and get her own man. |
| Doris Hounslow | 15 February | Maryann Turner | A former neighbour of Queenie Trott (Judy Cornwell). When Queenie's daughter Heather (Cheryl Fergison) tries to visit her, Doris says that Queenie moved away a few years ago. Heather gives Doris a photo of her son George to pass on before leaving. |
| Sarah Holding | 18 February | Uncredited | A woman sent to Kat Moon (Jessie Wallace) by the coroner to deliver the report on her baby Tommy Moon's autopsy. |
| Nick Meth | 21 February | Hywel Morgan | A journalist who attends the opening of Kim Fox's (Tameka Empson) new bed and breakfast. He pretends to be a friend of Denise Johnson's (Diane Parish) daughter Chelsea (Tiana Benjamin) but Denise realises he is from the press. He says that Denise's story of how her husband Lucas Johnson (Don Gilet) kidnapped her is great but Denise and Patrick Trueman (Rudolph Walker) tell him to leave. |
| Seb Parker | 24 February, 8–19 April | Tommy Bastow | A friend of Lauren Branning's (Jacqueline Jossa) from college. Lauren invites him to her house for a horror film night with her friends Mercy Olubunmi (Bunmi Mojekwu), Fatboy (Ricky Norwood) and Whitney Dean (Shona McGarty), and Lauren is annoyed at Mercy for flirting with him as Lauren is interested in him. Fatboy later becomes jealous when he sees Mercy and Seb together, and accuses Mercy of having sex with Seb. He ends his relationship with Mercy off screen. |
| Chris | 17 March | Richard Simons | A man who has sex with Whitney Dean (Shona McGarty) so that Rob Grayson (Jody Latham) can pay off a debt he has with Chris. |
| Chloe | 18 March | Georgia Henshaw | A girl at a party attended by Whitney Dean (Shona McGarty) and Rob Grayson (Jody Latham). She is being exploited sexually and tells Whitney she is pleased there is another girl there, and says she is Whitney's future. |
| Tommy | 22 March | Uncredited | A boy who is a friend of Morgan Jackson-King's (Devon Higgs). They play in Albert Square's gardens and Alfie (Shane Richie) and Kat Moon (Jessie Wallace) are disturbed by Morgan shouting his name, as their supposedly deceased son was also called Tommy. |
| Jools | 25 March | Sophie Austin | One of four promo girls hired by Michael Moon (Steve John Shepherd) to help promote his new gym, Basher Jim's. |
| Dr Will | 25 March | Andrew Forbes | The doctor that Kat (Jessie Wallace) and Alfie Moon (Shane Richie) visit at a fertility clinic to discuss IVF. |
| Tammy | 5 April | Emma Carryl | A prostitute who Ricky Butcher (Sid Owen) sees when searching for Whitney Dean (Shona McGarty), who is missing. Tammy wants payment to help search for Whitney, but she leaves when DC Newton (Luke Harris) arrives to question Ricky. |
| Andy | 8 April | Terence Frisch | A builder hired by Masood Ahmed (Nitin Ganatra) to provide a quotation for repairs at the Argee Bhajee restaurant after the roof collapses. Masood's wife Zainab Masood (Nina Wadia) mistakenly assumes that Andy is from their insurance company. |
| Rev Jonathan Bryars | 14–15 April | Paul Cawley | The reverend at Greg Jessop (Stefan Booth) and Tanya Branning's (Jo Joyner) wedding. |
| Lynette | 18 April | Rebecca Charles | The Forensic Medical Examiner who interviews Ronnie Branning (Samantha Womack) after she confesses to stealing Kat Moon's (Jessie Wallace) baby Tommy. |
| Dr Niall Heaton | 18 April | Andrew MacBean | A doctor who confirms to Jack Branning (Scott Maslen) that the baby Tommy Moon is not James Branning, who Jack believed him to be, as a DNA test does not match the hospital records. |
| PC Cyril Hickey | 18 April | Simon Killick | A police constable who attends when Jack Branning (Scott Maslen) finds out that the baby he thinks is his son James do not match the DNA samples the hospital have on record. |
| Jill | 18 April | Paddy Navin | A social worker who interviews Alfie Moon (Shane Richie) so that he and his wife Kat (Jessie Wallace) can be reunited with their baby Tommy, who was swapped with Ronnie Branning's (Samantha Womack) baby James. |
| Steve Merryman | 19 April | Richard Pepper | A journalist from the Walford Gazette, who interviews Whitney Dean (Shona McGarty) about Ronnie Branning's (Samantha Womack) story. When the story is published, Whitney insists Steve has twisted her words. |
| Nathan Clayton | 22 April–12 May | Sam Melvin | A bully at Ben Mitchell's (Joshua Pascoe) school. In Albert Square, he and two friends call Ben a "weirdo", saying that Ronnie Branning (Samantha Womack), who stole a baby to replace her dead baby, is his sister, and madness must run in the family. He later threatens Ben, saying he will end up back in prison. A few days later, he chases Ben through Albert Square, but Ben is saved by Abi Branning (Lorna Fitzgerald) and Nathan leaves when Jack Branning (Scott Maslen) gets involved. When Jay Mitchell (Jamie Borthwick) finds out that Nathan is bullying Ben, he forces Nathan into the house to apologise, but when Ben leaves, Jay lets Nathan go and Nathan threatens Jay. Later, Ben attacks Nathan, pushing him to the ground, but Jay stops him from attacking him further. |
| Daniel Mansard | 26–28 April | Richard Galazka | A man from the UK Border Agency who Fatboy (Ricky Norwood) sees on Bridge Street market, and calls him dodgy as he is just looking at people. The next day, he and a colleague approach Mercy Olubunmi (Bunmi Mojekwu), saying she is four months past her permit to stay in the UK. |
| Mr Kendrick | 2 May | Edward Hughes | Ronnie Branning's (Samantha Womack) solicitor, who tells Ronnie's sister Roxy Mitchell (Rita Simons) that Ronnie has refused bail and she has fired him. |
| Jeanette | 3–5 May | Georgia Reece | An escort hired by Ian Beale (Adam Woodyatt). He takes her for drinks in The Queen Victoria public house and tells her about his estranged wife Jane Beale (Laurie Brett). Ian gives her a necklace that he planned to give Jane for her birthday. The next day, Ian introduces Jeanette to people as his new girlfriend and tells Jane they knew each other from school. However, Jeanette tells Jean Slater (Gillian Wright) that they met online. Jean tells Jane, who gets the truth from Jeanette and tells her some things about Ian, so Jeanette decides to leave. |
| Kevin Flynn | 3 May | Ben Frimstone | A mechanic who Heather Trott (Cheryl Fergison) tracks down as she thinks he is a man she has been speaking to on the Internet. They get on well and he says he will have something interesting to blog about later. She asks him to have a drink with her, but he rejects her politely by saying that he is in a relationship. |
| Brenda | 6 May | Fiz Marcus | A woman interviewed by Dot Branning (June Brown) and Carol Jackson (Lindsey Coulson) to be Dot's carer though Dot dislikes her and sends her away. |
| Warren | 10 May | Darren Daly | Ben Mitchell's (Joshua Pascoe) youth offending officer. |
| Elaine | 17 May | Rebecca Saire | Ian Beale's (Adam Woodyatt) solicitor in his divorce hearing with Jane Beale (Laurie Brett). |
| Diane Finn | 20 May | Sally Hurst | A woman from an adoption agency who meets Christian Clarke (John Partridge) and Syed Masood (Marc Elliott). |
| Lorna | 2 June | Kate Sissons | A woman who interviews Ricky Butcher (Sid Owen) about a job in Dubai. |
| Gavin | 3–6 June | Bob Goody | A man who runs a group for people with drug problems, attended by Phil Mitchell (Steve McFadden) and Rainie Cross (Tanya Franks). |
| Judge Jasper Patterson | 14 June | Ian Targett | The judge in Mercy Olubunmi's (Bunmi Mojekwu) immigration hearing. |
| DS Tanfield | 16 June | Bob Cryer | A police officer who questions Janine Malloy (Charlie Brooks) over the death of her grandmother Lydia Simmonds (Heather Chasen). |
| Danny | 16 June | Andrew Jones | A friend of Christian Clarke's (John Partridge) who Christian and his partner Syed Masood (Marc Elliott) meet in a nightclub. |
| Catherine Kane | 17 June, 7 July | Tracy Wiles | Ronnie Branning's (Samantha Womack) lawyer. She advises Ronnie to expect a custodial sentence for stealing Tommy Moon. She later tells Ronnie that she could get off by using her history as her defence, claiming that she is the victim. |
| Tariq | 23 June, 2–5, 29 December | Antony Bunsee | Yusef Khan's (Ace Bhatti) cousin. He turns up late for the mehndi of Yusef's daughter Afia Khan (Meryl Fernandes) and her husband Tamwar Masood (Himesh Patel), and it is revealed through Tariq that Yusef started the fire that burnt Zainab Masood (Nina Wadia) when she was a teenager. Tariq returns in December, having heard that Yusef and Zainab are to marry. He tells Yusef not to go ahead with it as their family would be opposed to it. Yusef tells Tariq that he and his new family will move to Pakistan and not return, and offers Tariq the family's restaurant as thanks for his silence. However, Afia meets Tariq and reveals that Yusef does not own the restaurant, so Tariq tells Afia that Yusef started the fire and not his family. Afia accuses Tariq of lying, but he says he was there when Yusef struck the match. After Afia tells Yusef she has seen Tariq, Yusef visits him again and Tariq is angry at Yusef for lying about the restaurant. He threatens to tell the family about the wedding, and says that Yusef must find a way to get him the restaurant to keep his silence. After Yusef is killed in a fire, Tariq arrives at the Masoods' house to pay his respects, but is angrily told to leave and never return by Zainab and Afia. |
| Kelly | 28 June | Anna Johnson | Two of three sisters who turned up at The Queen Victoria public house to confront Tyler Moon (Tony Discipline) about him seeing all three of them at the same time. Kelly, the middle sister, pours cocktails over Tyler, and the three sisters, the younger of which is unnamed and uncredited, all slap him before leaving. |
| Gemma | 28 June | Leona O'Sullivan | Two of three sisters who turned up at The Queen Victoria public house to confront Tyler Moon (Tony Discipline) about him seeing all three of them at the same time. Kelly, the middle sister, pours cocktails over Tyler, and the three sisters, the younger of which is unnamed and uncredited, all slap him before leaving. |
| Henry Mason | 4–8 July | Brian Hibbard | A man who ran a children's home where Billy Mitchell (Perry Fenwick) and Julie Perkins (Cathy Murphy) were in care. He was accused of abusing some of the girls, including Julie, but was found not guilty at trial. Billy meets him in the hope that he can help track down the son he had with Julie while they were in care. They meet again later and Billy realises that Henry is just using Billy to get free meals when Henry says he has not found the old paperwork. However, they have a scuffle and Henry reveals Billy's son's last name is Pearce, before leaving. |
| Det Frank Merrill | 5 July | Steven Swan | A police detective who speaks to Ronnie Branning (Samantha Womack) while investigating a break-in at The Queen Victoria public house. |
| Philip Granger QC | 7 July | Simon Dutton | Ronnie Branning's (Samantha Womack) barrister at her trial for kidnapping Tommy Moon. |
| Mrs Bartlett | 7 July | Barbara Drennan | The prosecuting barrister in Ronnie Branning's (Samantha Womack) trial for kidnapping Tommy Moon. |
| Jon Hadley | 8 July | Tom Cornish | The executor of Lydia Simmonds' (Heather Chasen) will who informs her granddaughter Janine Malloy (Charlie Brooks) that she is the sole beneficiary of Lydia's estate. |
| Paul | 11 July | Adam Leese | A man visited by Billy Mitchell (Perry Fenwick) and Julie Perkins (Cathy Murphy) when they are looking for their son Dan Pearce. Paul is staying at Dan's address and pretends to be Dan until Billy and Julie reveal they are Dan's parents. Paul then admits he has stolen Dan's identity but Dan is actually dead. He gives them some of Dan's belongings, and they discover they have a granddaughter, Lola Pearce (Danielle Harold). |
| Hannah Gray | 12 July, 5 August | Cassie Friend | A care worker at the children's home where Billy Mitchell (Perry Fenwick) and Julie Perkins (Cathy Murphy) visit their granddaughter, Lola Pearce (Danielle Harold). She appears again after Lola returns to the home. |
| Shanessa | 12 July | Jodie Bagnell | A girl who Lola Pearce (Danielle Harold) fights with in the children's home. |
| Andy | 18 July | Jethro Skinner | A man seen by Rainie Cross (Tanya Franks) outside the R&R nightclub. Inside, he talks to Rainie and later offers her drugs. She is tempted but declines, and he is later ejected from the club by Shirley Carter (Linda Henry). |
| Mad Dog | 22–25 July | Vincenzo Nicoli | A friend of Mo Harris' (Laila Morse) who helps get her supplies for Bobby Beale's (Alex Francis) eighth birthday party. Eddie Moon (David Essex) learns that Mad Dog is squatting in his lock up, meaning he could be kicked out so Eddie would have premises to move his antiques business to. Eddie gets his son Tyler (Tony Discipline) to pose as a locksmith and his son Anthony (Matt Lapinskas) to pose as a member of the council, to evict Mad Dog. |
| Annie Farnham | 28 July – 8 August | Helen Elizabeth | A social worker who visits Billy Mitchell (Perry Fenwick) and Julie Perkins (Cathy Murphy) to see if their home is suitable for their granddaughter Lola Pearce (Danielle Harold) to live with them. They hide from Annie the fact that they are sqatting in the property. When she later visits Billy, he reveals that he now has a tenancy agreement as his relative Phil Mitchell (Steve McFadden) is paying for his rent, and that Julie has left him. Annie says that if Julie was not totally on board with taking Lola on, then it could be a good thing. |
| Andy 'Big Andy' Wilkins | 29 July | Derek Lea | A boxer who fights Tyler Moon (Tony Discipline) and loses. It is revealed that Tyler's brother Michael (Steve John Shepherd) paid Andy to lose. |
| Cheryl Matthews | 1–18 August | Heather Craney | A woman who Ian Beale (Adam Woodyatt) meets when he tries to get his son Bobby (Alex Francis) into a playgroup. She assumes that Ian's wife Jane (Laurie Brett) is dead, and Ian goes along with this. Cheryl then finds Bobby a place, even though she previously said they were full. Ian and Cheryl meet again and he offers to let Cheryl meet Jane, buying an urn and filling it with cigarette ash. When they meet again, she tells Ian that Jane still loves him and then kisses him, offering to go back to his house. She stays the night and the next day, speaks to Mo Harris (Laila Morse), who gossips about Ian, but Cheryl refuses to believe it and leaves before Mo reveals the truth about Jane. She later visits Ian but he pretends to be ill as he is expecting another woman, Rebecca (Louise Breckon-Richards). |
| Fiona Walker | 4 August | Sarah Head | A woman from Bobby Beale's (Alex Francis) playgroup, the mother of a girl called Maia. She meets Bobby's father Ian Beale (Adam Woodyatt) and takes sympathy as he claims his wife Jane Beale (Laurie Brett) is dead. When she leaves, she gives Ian her phone number. Fiona phones Ian later while he is with another woman, Rebecca (Louise Breckon-Richards). |
| Jude | 4 August | Keisha Atwell | Cora Cross' (Ann Mitchell) neighbour. Cora claims she has been evicted because Jude has an ASBO, but Jude confronts Cora and her daughters Tanya Jessop (Jo Joyner) and Rainie Cross (Tanya Franks) when they turn up to empty the house, and reveals that Cora is the one with the ASBO. |
| Rebecca | 16–19 August | Louise Breckon-Richards | A woman who visits Ian Beale (Adam Woodyatt) after meeting him at the playground with his son Bobby Beale (Alex Francis). When Darren Miller (Charlie G. Hawkins) wants to rent a flat from Ian, Ian is reluctant until Rebecca takes pity on Darren, and when Ian invites Rebecca over, she assumes it is to clear the flat while Ian wants to go on a date. Later when she visits Ian, he tells her he likes her, but then reveals that he has not been honest about his wife Jane Beale (Laurie Brett), as Rebecca believed she had died. Rebecca is unhappy about this and leaves. |
| Nurse Connock | 18 August | Sheena Patel | A nurse who sees Tanya Jessop (Jo Joyner) when she is tested for cervical cancer. |
| PC Evans | 18 August 2011– 25 December 2017 (12 episodes to date) | Adam McNamara | A police officer who leads a drugs raid on The Queen Victoria public house and discovers Ryan Malloy (Neil McDermott) to be in possession of cocaine and arrests him. In April 2012, he arrests Bianca Butcher (Patsy Palmer) for theft. In October, he arrests Lola Pearce (Danielle Harold) for assaulting Alexa Smith (Saffron Coomber). In November 2013, he attends Janine Butcher's (Charlie Brooks) house after she calls the police to say she is being attacked, and discovers that her husband Michael Moon (Steve John Shepherd) has been stabbed to death. Later that month, he comes to Albert Square to look for Ian Beale (Adam Woodyatt), who is due to give evidence against Max Branning (Jake Wood) in court but has not turned up. In July 2014, he visits the Butcher family after a report that Tiffany Butcher (Maisie Smith) brought brownies baked with cannabis into school. Evans questions Liam Butcher (James Forde) who had given his sister the cakes, and he claims that he found them on a bench. In November, he arrests Buster Briggs (Karl Howman) for absconding from prison day release. In February 2015, Evans visits The Queen Vic and informs Shirley Carter (Linda Henry) that a man, matching the description of her son Dean Wicks (Matt Di Angelo), had been discovered badly injured in a burnt-out car. Evans tells Shirley that the man had Dean's wallet and driving license on him and asks Shirley to come to the hospital to identify him, but Shirley refuses to believe that it is Dean and Evans leaves, giving Shirley's eldest son, Mick (Danny Dyer), his card in case Shirley changes her mind. Shirley later does so and accompanies Evans to the hospital to identify the man but it is not Dean. In April, Evans arrests Dean for breaching his bail conditions. Dean resists and shoves Evans and is also charged with assaulting a police officer. In September, Evans appears at The Queen Vic and arrests Cora Cross (Ann Mitchell) for failing to appear in court as a witness at Max's trial for Lucy Beale's (Hetti Bywater) murder. On Christmas Day 2017, Evans is called to the Vic after Lauren (Jacqueline Jossa) and Abi Branning (Lorna Fitzgerald) fall off the roof. |
| Nurse Roger | 19 August | Daniel Curtis | A nurse who sees Tanya Jessop (Jo Joyner) when she goes to get her cervical cancer test results. |
| Debs | 23–25 August | Jessica Ellis | Two women who talk to Heather Trott (Cheryl Fergison) and Shirley Carter (Linda Henry) at a 1980s music festival in Southend-on-Sea. |
| Tilly | 23 August | Leah Whitaker | Two women who talk to Heather Trott (Cheryl Fergison) and Shirley Carter (Linda Henry) at a 1980s music festival in Southend-on-Sea. |
| DC Blake | 26 August | Sally Orrock | A police officer who talks to Whitney Dean (Shona McGarty) after Rob Grayson (Jody Latham) and her brother Ryan Malloy (Neil McDermott) fight and fall off a pier into the sea. |
| Paul Ward | 29–30 August | Danny Midwinter | A man who attacks Mandy Salter (Nicola Stapleton) outside the lap dancing club where she works. He claims she stole money from him. Mandy sees Ian Beale (Adam Woodyatt), who rescues her from him. Mandy claims Paul is her ex-boyfriend, and Ian gathers some people to help get rid of Paul when he follows them to Albert Square. He leaves after threatening Ian, when it emerges he is actually Mandy's boss. He later reports Ian and Mandy for stealing his money, which Mandy has hidden in Ian's car. |
| DC Towers | 30 August | Grant Ibbs | An undercover police officer who questions Ian Beale (Adam Woodyatt) after he was wrongly arrested for soliciting. |
| Geoff | 2 September | David Gillies | A man who Rainie Cross (Tanya Franks) lets stay at her sister Tanya Jessop's (Jo Joyner) house overnight because his wife has left him. |
| Duncan Willis or Wilkins | 2–29 September | Steven France | A 16-year-old boxer brought to Walford by Michael Moon (Steve John Shepherd). He then befriends Ben Mitchell (Joshua Pascoe). When Ben decides he wants to box, his father Phil Mitchell (Steve McFadden) pairs him with Duncan. Duncan tells Ben to look into his eyes as they are fighting, causing Ben to blush. Later, when Duncan tends to Ben's injured hand, Ben kisses Duncan, and immediately apologises, but Duncan kisses him back. A few days later, they take a break from training and kiss in the alleyway again, and are seen by Patrick Trueman (Rudolph Walker). Things go wrong between Ben and Patrick, which causes Phil to start a hate campaign against Patrick, so Duncan tells Ben things between them were only a bit of fun, and he decides to change to a different gym. Duncan is credited as Duncan Willis but is referred to as Duncan Wilkins in the show. |
| Mr Waverly | 2 September | David Acton | Tanya Jessop's (Jo Joyner) consultant when she is tested for cervical cancer. She later visits him and he tells her that she needs to have tests to see if her cancer has spread, and her options are a hysterectomy if it has not spread or radiotherapy and chemotherapy if it has. |
| Dr Leonard Graham | 9, 20–23 September | Tim Berrington | A couple who meet Yusef Khan (Ace Bhatti) and Zainab Masood (Nina Wadia) at an event, and assume that Zainab is Yusef's wife. Zainab goes along with it. Later, when he comes to Walford, he calls Zainab by "Mrs Khan", causing Zainab to tell Yusef to stay away from him, as they have acted inappropriately. Dr Graham meets Yusef at the hospital when Zainab is taken in following an overdose caused by Yusef, and meets her actual husband, Masood, but is unaware that Zainab is the patient. |
| Alison Graham | 9 September | Liz Wyatt | A couple who meet Yusef Khan (Ace Bhatti) and Zainab Masood (Nina Wadia) at an event, and assume that Zainab is Yusef's wife. Zainab goes along with it. Later, when he comes to Walford, he calls Zainab by "Mrs Khan", causing Zainab to tell Yusef to stay away from him, as they have acted inappropriately. Dr Graham meets Yusef at the hospital when Zainab is taken in following an overdose caused by Yusef, and meets her actual husband, Masood, but is unaware that Zainab is the patient. |
| Artie Stiller | 13–14 September | Maurice Lee | A boxer who fights Tyler Moon (Tony Discipline). Artie is known to fight dirty and apparently someone died following a fight with him. He knocks Tyler down several times but he continues to get up and eventually beats Artie, before suffering a seizure. |
| Sandra Halliday | 14–16 September | Victoria Wicks | A woman at the hospital who explains to Eddie Moon (David Essex) that his son Tyler (Tony Discipline) has bleeding on the brain following a boxing match. She later confirms that Tyler could have brain damage after he comes out of surgery. |
| Nicky | 15 September 2011– 14 March 2016 (4 episodes) | Melissa Dean | A paramedic. In 2012, she tends to Heather Trott (Cheryl Fergison). In 2013, she tends to Lexi Pearce when she falls ill with a high temperature. |
| Nurse Linda | 19 September | Sally Ann Burnett | Tanya Jessop's (Jo Joyner) nurse when she has a laparoscopy operation. |
| Dr Arnott | 23 September | Gregory Finnegan | The doctor who deals with Zainab Masood (Nina Wadia) and her family when Zainab goes into hospital for a suspected drugs overdose. |
| Ashton Burns | 29 September | Daniel Attwell | A man who flirts with Kat Moon (Jessie Wallace) in R&R, though Mandy Salter (Nicola Stapleton) flirts with him first. |
| Sophie | 4–18 October; 3 February 2012 | Jane Cameron | A woman who Whitney Dean (Shona McGarty) talks to about becoming a nursery nurse. Sophie gives Whitney a work experience placement. Sophie later appears at the nursery when Roxy Mitchell (Rita Simons) is there with her daughter Amy Mitchell (Amelie Conway). In February 2012, Whitney notices Amy pinching George Trott and tells Sophie, who says she will look out for it but thinks it is probably nothing. After Whitney tells Roxy and Amy's father Jack Branning (Scott Maslen) about Amy, Roxy calls Sophie to complain. After an investigation Sophie tells Whitney she can keep her job but Whitney says that she wants to work with teenagers instead but still takes her job back until she makes a decision. |
| Gordon Bags | 4 October | Gerard McDermott | A member of the local Community Trust, who indecently propositions Mandy Salter (Nicola Stapleton), knowing she has worked as a stripper, at a Trust event. This leads to Ian Beale (Adam Woodyatt) pushing cake into Gordon's face, which leads to a food fight. |
| Kris Jennings | 4 October | Adam Woodroffe | A member of the local Community Trust, who is having a leaving party attended by many local business people. |
| Nurse Vicky | 7 October | Pauline Whitaker | A nurse who gives Tanya Jessop (Jo Joyner) a scan and blood tests, and then a list of appointments for radiotherapy and chemotherapy. |
| Brian | 10 October | Uncredited | A man employed by Janine Malloy (Charlie Brooks) to measure up Roxy Mitchell's (Rita Simons) flat, which Janine has bought. When Brian walks dog faeces on the carpet, Janine says Roxy's rent increase will pay for new carpets. |
| Sam | 10 October, 28 November | Babatunde Aleshe | A specialist nurse who tends to Tanya Jessop (Jo Joyner) when she has her first chemotherapy session. A few weeks later Sam tells Tanya that her friend and fellow cancer patient, Siobhan (Sara Stephens) has died, and then calms Tanya when she suffers a panic attack. When Tanya's daughter Lauren (Jacqueline Jossa) goes to the hospital to her mother, she meets Sam. Although Sam only says to Lauren that she needs to speak to her mother urgently, Lauren understands that this means that Tanya has not been going to her treatment sessions. Tanya resumes her therapy, and Sam, along with Dr Faye Morrison (Anna Francolini), talk her through what will happen. |
| Siobhan | 10 October | Sara Stephens | A woman who Tanya Jessop (Jo Joyner) meets before her first chemotherapy session. Siobhan says she is just visiting and tells Tanya that if she does not want the treatment then she should not get it. When Tanya is having her treatment, Siobhan enters without her wig, revealing that she is a cancer patient. Tanya and Siobhan then become friends, communicating by text message. A few weeks later, Tanya is informed that Siobhan has died of pneumonia. |
| Dr Robin Dennington | 24 October | Martin Fisher | A doctor who sees to Amira (Preeya Kalidas) and Syed Masood's (Marc Elliott) baby, Yasmin Masood, when Amira thinks she has swallowed a ring. |
| Dr Clements | 4 November | Simon Shackleton | A doctor who sees to Amy Mitchell (Amelie Conway) after she nearly drowns in a bath. |
| Bev Gregory | 4 November, 10 February 2012 | Kate Miles | A social worker who awards temporary custody of Amy Mitchell (Amelie Conway) to her father Jack Branning (Scott Maslen), after interviewing both Jack and Roxy Mitchell (Rita Simons), Amy's mother, about an incident in which Amy almost drowned. In February 2012 she is present after Roxy wins custody of Amy and Jack has to hand her over. |
| Brendan | 11 November | James Farrar | One of a group of boys who cycle around Albert Square, shouting "pervert" and "paedo" following 15-year-old Ben Mitchell's (Joshua Pascoe) false accusation that Christian Clarke (John Partridge) touched him inappropriately. |
| PC Grant | 17 November 2011, 26 November 2012 | Drew Edwards | A police constable who investigates a lock-in at The Queen Victoria public house. When he arrives at the pub, a drunken Tanya Jessop (Jo Joyner) asks who has ordered a stripper. The landlord Alfie Moon (Shane Richie) is forced to apologise to him on her behalf. In November 2012, he attends a car crash scene and speaks to Joey Branning (David Witts) and later interviews Lauren Branning (Jacqueline Jossa) about the crash in hospital. |
| Dr Faye Morrison | 22–28 November | Anna Francolini | The oncologist who Tanya Jessop (Jo Joyner) sees when she goes to hospital. Tanya, who has cervical cancer, tells Dr Morrison that she no longer wishes to continue her treatment. Dr Morrison tells Tanya that she could die, but Tanya still refuses. She soon changes her mind, and Dr Morrison, along with specialist nurse Sam (Babatunde Aleshe), talk her through what will happen. |
| Devon | 23 November | Jack Morris | A man who Lauren Branning (Jacqueline Jossa) wakes up with after a night out. |
| PC Angus Clarkson | 23 November | Craig Henderson | A police officer who returns Abi Branning (Lorna Fitzgerald) to her mother Tanya Jessop (Jo Joyner) after she is caught shoplifting a pair of shoes that Tanya refused to pay for. |
| Rita | 24–25 November | Amanda Horlock | A blonde woman who is with Max Branning (Jake Wood) and Derek Branning (Jamie Foreman) when they return to Walford. She waits in the car until they decide to leave. When Derek and Max decide to stay in Walford, Derek tells Rita to go back to Leyton, giving her bus fare to do so. |
| Harpreet | 28 November | Danny Rahim | A social worker who wants to see Lola Pearce (Danielle Harold) to introduce himself as he is new. Abi Branning (Lorna Fitzgerald) pretends to be Lola, who has gone missing. Lola's grandfather, Billy Mitchell (Perry Fenwick) assumes Harpreet heard that Lola is pregnant, and reveals this to him. Abi impresses Harpreet when she talks about being a mother. However, as he is about to leave, Lola arrives and the truth is revealed. Harpreet then says they have lost his trust and Lola may not be able to keep the baby. |
| Troy | 5 December | Darren Saul | A man who Kat Moon (Jessie Wallace) flirts with in The Queen Victoria public house to make her husband Alfie Moon (Shane Richie) pay her more attention. Later, Kat goes out with her friends and meets Troy again, ending up alone at his house, but she falls asleep and leaves early in the morning. |
| DS Adrian Kain or Bain | 6–9 December; 20 June 2012; 13 March–1 April 2013; 20 June 2014; 2 January 2015 | Joe Tucker | A police officer who leads a search of Phil Mitchell's (Steve McFadden) properties—his home, The Queen Victoria public house and Mitchell's Autos—in a dawn raid. Kain does not say what they are looking for but leaves empty handed, saying they will be back. Kain later returns to tell Phil they have recovered several items of stolen jewellery buried at the local allotments. Kain later arrests Billy Mitchell (Perry Fenwick), as they found his fingerprints on the stolen goods. In June 2012, Kain questions Michael Moon (Steve John Shepherd) about an allegation of fraud, and releases Michael on police bail. He returns in 2013, credited as DS Bain, and speaks to Bianca Butcher (Patsy Palmer) about the mugging of Tamwar Masood (Himesh Patel), as her son Liam Butcher (James Forde) may be involved. Bianca gives Bain a false alibi for Liam. After Liam and the gang he is involved with are arrested, Bain and his colleague DC Booth (Sanchia McCormack) interview Liam about his involvement with the gang. Bain offers help as long as Liam is honest with them. After Liam is stabbed by a gang member, Chris, Bain tells Liam that Chris has been arrested, but tells Bianca that he has not been charged as the gang all denied any involvement and there is a lack of evidence. In June 2014, Bain appears when he investigates an assault on Sharon Rickman (Letitia Dean) during a break-in at her Wine Bar, The Albert. Bain questions Sharon as she is recovering in hospital and she is unable to give him a description of her attackers. Phil, who is Sharon's partner, tells Bain to leave as he is distressing her. Bain does so after giving Sharon his card. In January 2015, Bain arrests Phil for criminal damage with intent to endanger life by cutting the brakes of his cousin, Roxy Mitchell's (Rita Simons) car. |
| Hayley or Helen Roberts | 9 December 2011; 29 June–24 July 2012 | Martine Brown | In 2011, the character is called Hayley. She is a social worker from Children's Services who visits Lola Pearce (Danielle Harold) in hospital after a fall. Her grandfather Billy Mitchell (Perry Fenwick) tells her that it was an accident, and Lola later backs this up. In 2012, the character is called Helen, and she attends a meeting with Lola, Billy and several of her colleagues—social worker Sara Ellis, Sakeena Ahmed from Walford General Midwifery Team, DC Nick Crane, a special case worker from Walford police, and Charlie Bearman, who chairs the meeting. She reappears with the police when Lola is arrested for vandalism, and advises Lola to plead guilty. After Lola receives an electronic tag and curfew, Helen tells Lola it is a good opportunity to relax. When Lola gives birth to her daughter Lexi Pearce, Helen says she will keep an eye on Lola and Billy. |
| Nurse Green | 9 December 2011, 26 November 2012, 14–15 February 2013 | Tala Gouveia | A nurse who tends to Lola Pearce (Danielle Harold) after she falls down the steps, and confirms that she and her unborn baby are fine. In November 2012, she is present when Joey Branning (David Witts) and Lauren Branning (Jacqueline Jossa) are in hospital following a car crash. In February 2013, she cares for Patrick Trueman (Rudolph Walker) when he is hospitalised following a fall. |
| Carter | 12 December | Andrew Scarborough | A man to whom Jean Slater (Gillian Wright) is attracted after she meets him in the local shop and he takes an interest in her work at The Queen Victoria public house. However, he reveals he is a benefit fraud officer and accuses Jean of illegally claiming benefits whilst working. |
| PC Ali Psyk | 20 December; 21–22 March 2012; 16 July 2012; 14 February 2013 | Yvonne Dodoo | A police officer who, along with her unnamed colleague, attends Zainab (Nina Wadia) and Yusef Khan's (Ace Bhatti) house after Zainab's ex-husband Masood Ahmed (Nitin Ganatra) reports their son Kamil Masood (Arian Chikhlia) missing. Yusef gives the officers the address where Kamil is staying, and they then tell Masood they cannot get involved in a domestic dispute. In March 2012, she is present during the investigation into the murder of Heather Trott (Cheryl Fergison). In July, she arrests Lola Pearce (Danielle Harold) after she stays out beyond her curfew and takes food from a fast food restaurant without paying. In February 2013, she speaks to Bianca Butcher (Patsy Palmer) and Kat Moon (Jessie Wallace) about stolen goods. |
| Paul | 22 December | Richard Sutton | A nurse who sees to Jean Slater (Gillian Wright) after her bipolar disorder takes a turn for the worse. Jean's relative Kat Moon (Jessie Wallace) tells Paul that Jean thinks Shenice Quinn (Lily Harvey) is an angel. Paul allows Jean to stay with Kat after Kat persuades him. |
| Laila | 23–25 December | Manjeet Mann | A friend of Yusef Khan (Ace Bhatti), who looks after Kamil Masood (Arian Chikhlia) for Yusef after he takes the child away from his mother, Zainab Khan (Nina Wadia). Yusef and Zainab meet Kamil and Laila in a café and Zainab tries to escape but Yusef stops her. Yusef then takes Zainab, Kamil and Laila and leaves. She appears later when Kamil's father Masood Ahmed (Nitin Ganatra) tracks her down to retrieve Kamil. |
| Rahul | 24 December | Pommy Bhogal | A man who Tamwar Masood (Himesh Patel) temporarily leaves in charge of his restaurant while he and his wife Afia Masood (Meryl Fernandes) are away. Yusef Khan (Ace Bhatti) tells Rahul the move will be permanent. |
| DI Savage | 27 December | Andrew Whipp | Two police officers who arrest Phil Mitchell (Steve McFadden) for the murder of Kevin Wicks (Phil Daniels) and interview him at the police station. |
| DC McEwen | 27 December | Uncredited | Two police officers who arrest Phil Mitchell (Steve McFadden) for the murder of Kevin Wicks (Phil Daniels) and interview him at the police station. |
| Joseph Hardcastle | 27 December; 12 June 2012 | Michael Quartey | Derek Branning's (Jamie Foreman) probation officer, who visits Derek following reports that his house was searched for stolen goods. Derek convinces Joseph that he has given up crime since getting back in touch with his daughter, Alice (Jasmyn Banks), but Joseph realises he is lying after speaking to Derek's brother Max Branning (Jake Wood). |
| Dr Kelly | 29 December | Brendan Hughes | A doctor who looks after Pat Evans (Pam St Clement) when she is hospitalised for chest pains and shortness of breath, assuming she is suffering from stress. She discharges herself but later returns, and Dr Kelly tells her that abnormalities could be because of cancer. |
| Dr Etheridge | 30 December | Ken Drury | A doctor who diagnoses Pat Evans (Pam St Clement) with pancreatic cancer, telling her that it has spread to various parts of her body. He offers her treatment, but she refuses and is then discharged. |
