= Bryan Kirkwood =

British television producer (born 1975)

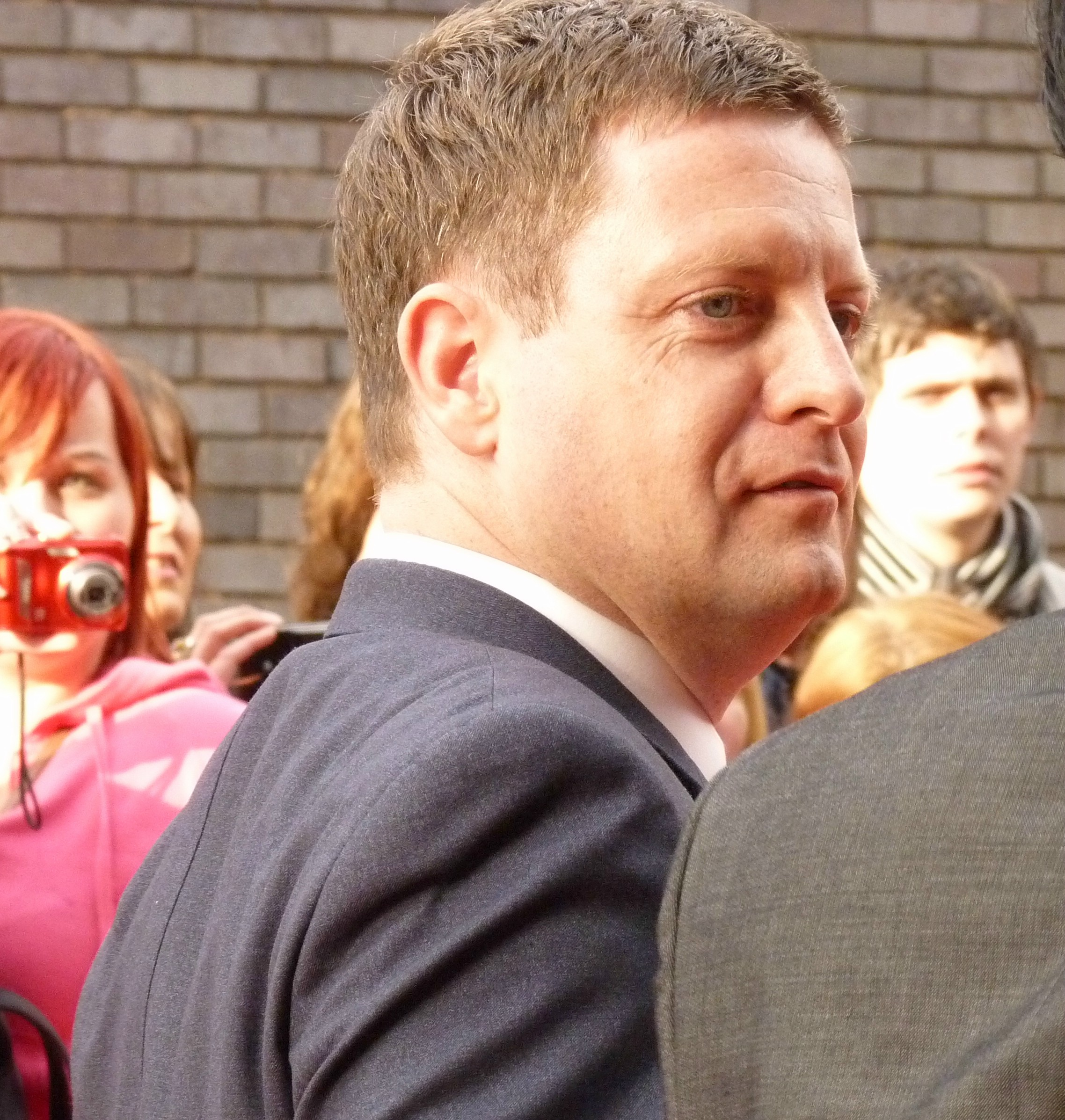
- Kirkwood in 2011
- Born: November 1975 (age 50–51); Bellshill, Scotland
- Occupation: Television producer
- Years active: 2002–present
- Employer(s): Lime Pictures (prev. ITV, Channel 4 and the BBC)
- Television: Coronation Street; Hollyoaks; EastEnders; Mark Wright's Hollywood Nights

Bryan Kirkwood (born November 1975) is a British television producer. He was the producer of the Channel 4 soap opera Hollyoaks from 2006 until 2009 and was the executive producer of the BBC soap opera EastEnders from 2010 until 2012. He returned as the executive producer of Hollyoaks in late 2012, before leaving again in March 2021. His final episodes aired in June of that year. In 2022, he returned to EastEnders as a writer.

== Career ==
Kirkwood's first major role came as a storyline for ITV's Coronation Street. He later took control as the producer for Channel 4's Hollyoaks between 2006 and 2009, a period in which the show explored a number of well-loved and critically acclaimed storylines (such as that of the relationship between John Paul McQueen and Craig Dean and the Dog at the Pond explosion that killed five characters). After leaving the main Hollyoaks team, he produced the second series of the late-night spin-off Hollyoaks Later, shown in 2009 on E4. He became responsible for the casting of several new characters and guest appearances, such as Bonnie Tyler.

On 2 November 2009, it was announced that he would become the executive producer of the BBC One soap opera EastEnders, replacing Diederick Santer. He faced criticism from the media before he even assumed his role on EastEnders, with many reporting he planned to 'sex up' the show on arrival. His appointment came on 1 March 2010 as Santer stepped down from the role after the 25th anniversary celebrations. His first episode was broadcast on 4 June 2010 (moved from 7 June due to a schedule change), though he shares the executive producer credit with Santer for two weeks.

Kirkwood's tenure oversaw numerous high-profile storylines, such as the death of Billie Jackson (Devon Anderson), and the introduction of such characters as Michael Moon (Steve John Shepherd), Yusef Khan (Ace Bhatti), Vanessa Gold (Zöe Lucker), Jodie Gold (Kylie Babbington), Julie Perkins (Cathy Murphy), Lola Pearce (Danielle Harold), Rose Cotton (Polly Perkins) and Andrew Cotton (Ricky Grover). Other ideas, however, such as the decision to kill off long-standing soap veteran Pat Butcher (Pam St Clement) and Heather Trott (Cheryl Fergison), were not as well-received and prompted heavy criticism. The show was also criticised for pandering too heavily towards a younger demographic, insofar that the soap was, at one point, dubbed the "East End version of Hollyoaks."

In January 2011, an EastEnders baby swap storyline involving Ronnie Branning (Samantha Womack) and Kat Moon (Jessie Wallace) gained over 10,000 complaints, which resulted in the BBC ending the storyline earlier than planned. On 12 March 2012, it was announced Kirkwood had decided to leave his position of executive producer of EastEnders, and left in April 2012, after two years in charge with series producer Lorraine Newman temporarily taking over his role. Of his departure, Kirkwood said "Being the executive producer of EastEnders is one of the most exciting jobs in TV, but it's also the most exhausting - so after two years, I've decided it's time to leave Walford."

Later that month it was announced that Kirkwood had returned to working with Lime Pictures. Working alongside Tony Wood, Kirkwood will help create new scripted and reality drama. He produced Mark Wright's Hollywood Nights before returning as executive producer of Hollyoaks. In September 2020, it was announced that Kirkwood had made the decision to depart from Lime Pictures and Hollyoaks in March of that year, with his final episode airing in June 2021.

In April 2022 it was announced that he would be returning to EastEnders as a writer.

== Personal life ==
Kirkwood was born in Bellshill, Scotland. He formerly lived in East Kilbride and in Edinburgh prior to moving to Brighton, England at a young age. Kirkwood is openly gay, and was living in Liverpool with his partner in 2006.
