= Jane Cameron =

English actress

- Born: Jane McDermott; 29 November 1974 (age 51); Yorkshire, England, UK
- Occupation: Actress
- Years active: 1996–present
- Notable work: See below
- Television: Emmerdale; M.I.High

Jane Cameron (born 29 November 1974) is an English actress, known for her roles as Sophie Wright in the ITV soap opera Emmerdale and as Ms. Templeman in the BBC children's show M.I.High. In 2011–12, she appeared on EastEnders as Sophie for four episodes.

== Early and personal life ==
Cameron was born in Yorkshire and attended Ilkley Grammar School. In 1998, she, her mother, and her stepfather were involved in a car accident. Her stepfather Steven Wood was driving the car with Jane and her mother inside, when it collided with Melanie Powell, 20, a friend of Jane's younger brother. The two cars crashed into a field near Menwith Hill, Harrogate, North Yorkshire at an unlit junction. All of the passengers in Wood's car survived, suffering minor bruises, but Powell, who worked in Bradford, and was driving home to see her boyfriend, died.

== Career ==
"In ways, it's nice to have a baby on screen. When he's supposed to be crying, often he'll be as happy as anything. And when he's supposed to be happy, he can be a bit grizzly. We have to wait for the crying".

— Cameron describes having a baby in the majority of her scenes on Emmerdale (1997)

Throughout 1996 to 1997, Cameron appeared as nanny Sophie Wright in the ITV soap opera Emmerdale. Cameron got the role after a year out of drama school, "being thrust into a gruelling schedule in Emmerdale". She was initially auditioning for another part at Yorkshire Television, but got the Emmerdale role instead. Her father, David McDermott, was once a set designer on the show and was introduced as the nanny to James Tate. Cameron said that when she and her parents moved to America for six months when she was 16, she worked as nanny, calling it a "great experience". She said, "Until you've spent every day with a baby, you don't know what it's like. In one of the first scenes, which I read in the audition, someone said, 'Doesn't it make you want to have one of your own?' My character replied, 'No, absolutely not', it's a 24-hour-a-day job". Cameron spoke to a number of parents so she was prepared for the role of Sophie, wanting to be "professional", something which Cameron described Sophie as.

Cameron opined that she enjoyed having a baby on screen all the time, saying it is "like a prop", adding; "You can focus all your energies on the job in hand. But in other ways it can be hard, like when the baby cries. When he was a small baby, he slept most of the time, which is easier. When I got more used to things, the baby got more irritated. But his mother is always around and feels safe when she hands him over to me". The main storyline Cameron received was being paired with "lesbian vet" Zoe Tate (Leah Bracknell), until Cameron quit Emmerdale in 1997. Of her appearance in Band of Gold in 1996, she described her role as "brilliant" and "so well written".

== Filmography ==
Television

Year	Title	Role	Notes
2012	Silent Witness	Sharon Roberts	1 episode
2011–12	EastEnders	Sophie	4 episodes
2008	Doctors	Becky Gainer	1 episode
2008	EastEnders	D.C. Bedows	1 episode
2008	Holby City	Natalie Reynolds	1 episode
2008	Primeval	Teacher	1 episode
2007–08	M.I. High	Ms. Templeman	22 episodes
2006	Green Wing	Nurse	1 episode
2005	Man Stroke Woman	Gloria/Customer	1 episode
2005	The Bill	Maxine Burt	1 episode
2004	North & South	Young woman	1 episode
2001	Doctors	Sally Piper	1 episode
1999	Holby City	Lisa	1 episode
1996	Band of Gold	Sarah Levison	2 episodes
1996	Dalziel and Pascoe	Shelia	1 episode
1996–97	Emmerdale	Sophie Wright	81 episodes

Film

Year	Title	Role
2005	You Can Run	Lucy

Radio

Year	Title	Role
1998	Divided Harvest	Katherine

Stage

Year	Title	Role
2007	Humble Boy	Rosie
2004	Frankestein	Justine
2001	Accrington Pals	Sarah
2001	Stairs to the Roof	Alma
2001	The Clandestine Marriage	Fanny
2000	Cinderella- The Ash Girl	Ruth
2000	Lonely Lives	Kitty
2000	Six Degrees of Separation	Elizabeth
1999	Reader, I Murdered Him	Emily Brontë
1999	Under Milk Wood	Mae Rose/Polly Garter
1998	The Storm	Glasha
