= Yusef Khan =

Fictional character from EastEnders

- EastEnders character
- Portrayed by: Ace Bhatti
- Duration: 2010–2011
- First appearance: Episode 4109; 23 November 2010
- Last appearance: Episode 4344; 26 December 2011
- Introduced by: Bryan Kirkwood
In-universe information
- Occupation: General practitioner
- Wife: Zainab Masood (backstory, 2011)
- Daughters: Afia Masood
- Stepsons: Syed Masood; Tamwar Masood; Kamil Masood
- Stepdaughters: Shabnam Masood
- First cousins: Tariq

Dr. Yusef Khan is a fictional character from the BBC soap opera EastEnders, played by Ace Bhatti. Yusef is the father of Afia Khan (Meryl Fernandes) and former husband of established character, Zainab Masood (Nina Wadia). He appears from 23 November 2010. Described as strong-willed, he arrives as Walford's new general practitioner. He departed on 26 December 2011, following the end of his domestic abuse storyline with his wife Zainab Masood (Nina Wadia) in which he served as the show's main antagonist. Bhatti was voted "Best Newcomer" at the TV Quick awards and for "Best Storyline" for destroying the Masoods.

== Creation and development ==
=== Casting, introduction and departure ===
Bhatti was already known to EastEnders executive producer Bryan Kirkwood when he auditioned for the part, as Kirkwood and Bhatti worked on Coronation Street at the same time. Bhatti was the only actor who auditioned for the part of Yusef. In fact, Wadia recommended Bhatti to Kirkwood to play Yusef, as she "thought that he definitely had the quality that Yusef would need—which is a very ambiguous but charming quality!" Bhatti explained to Digital Spy that the EastEnders cast are very welcoming. He explained: "They're so welcoming. There's a lot of joking about. I'm having a great time at EastEnders—it's a real privilege to be here. I've known Nitin and Nina Wadia, who plays Zainab, for a very long time and we've always got on very well. Nitin and I play tense scenes together so it's nice that we can have a laugh afterwards."

Yusef is introduced as part of a storyline involving the Masood family. Tamwar dates Afia and when Yusef is introduced to Tamwar's parents, Masood and Zainab, Masood "explodes" with anger at the sight of him, recognising him as a man from their past. Ganatra explained that although Yusef allegedly tried to save Zainab from the fire, all Masood saw was Zainab locked in a burning kitchen: "we are only playing it from each person's point of view. Yusef is playing it from his point of view that he did try and save her. Masood is saying, 'All I know is that I went back to get her and she had been locked in this kitchen and it was on fire'." Patel said the storyline is shocking with a clever twist. In March 2011, Bhatti said he was staying with EastEnders until around June 2011, and would "see from there". He made his first appearance on 23 November 2010. Ganatra spoke at the British Soap Awards 2011 to Digital Spy and praised the impact of Yusef, saying,"He's very much an arch-villain—he's a great character who's there to put jeopardy into the Masoods' relationship. Zainab and Masood have been married for 28 years and they're mad about each other—for someone to come and destroy that slightly, it's exciting. It's exciting for us to play."

Bhatti's departure was not announced. When a fire was reported to be happening around Christmas 2011, rumours emerged from an alleged EastEnders insider that "Yusef has long been tipped as a possible fatality". The insider added, "This is the biggest fire EastEnders has ever seen and there will be casualties. It is such a huge disaster that it will affect most of the families on the show in one way or another. There is a great tradition at EastEnders of captivating Christmas Day storylines and this year is no different." Yusef's death aired on 26 December 2011, concluding his storyline.

=== Personality ===
On the EastEnders website, Yusef is described as calm, collected, strong-willed, mysterious, loyal to Afia and regretful of his past. Daniel Maier from The Guardian said that Yusef "is clearly a wrong 'un but it's hard to tell exactly what his game is. You suspect he's not sure himself. A Baddie Without Portfolio, most of his time seems taken up with malicious glances and general inveigling." Susan Hill from the Daily Star called Yusef "twisted", while Tony Stewart from the Daily Mirror called him "smug, deceitful and dangerous". Wadia opined that Yusef is not evil but much more complex than that, and his personality would be explored during his storyline.

=== Storyline development ===
"Yusef would die for his daughter - without question, at a moment's notice. I think he's very happy that she's found love with Tamwar - he likes the combination between them and he likes the fact that Tamwar makes his daughter happy. He likes Tamwar, but at the same time, that wouldn't stop him from manipulating him."

— Ace Bhatti describes Yusef's relationship with his daughter

In an interview with Digital Spy, Bhatti described his relationship with his daughter Afia, explaining that they have a "strong bond" and that Yusef would die for his daughter. He said that "it definitely hurts" when he finds out that Tamwar and Afia are already married, as he is so close to Afia and she has betrayed him. In an interview with Inside Soap, Bhatti admits that he is sympathetic for his character, Yusef. He said that Yusef is very insecure and that he can understand his behaviour in some ways. Meanwhile, discussing the fan reaction to his character, Bhatti admitted that women have told him that he's a "bad man". Bhatti also hinted that Yusef will become more firmly established as a Walford villain over the next few weeks, stating that Yusef does have more bad qualities than good and that fans call him "Dr. Evil".

Yusef is wrongly accused of having an affair with Zainab, due to his sister-in-law overhearing them speaking. A source said that the whole day turns into a disaster. When Shameem sees Yusef and Zainab together, she automatically thinks they're having an affair, and everyone struggles to come to terms with what they have heard. Bhatti has admitted that he is surprised by his status as a heartthrob. Interviewed by Will Payne of the Sunday Mirror, he said that it's a great compliment; however, it was a complete surprise. Bhatti hinted that perhaps women love the character, but he prefers trainers and jeans to smart suits.

==== Kidnap ====
In April 2011, it was reported that Masood would kidnap Yusef, pour petrol on him and threaten to set him on fire. Yusef will then go to the Masood's house and tell Zainab what Masood has done. An EastEnders insider told the News of the World, "Masood has never got over that. Tension has been simmering for a while and leads to an outpouring of violence from Masood that leaves Yusef seriously injured. But Yusef will get his own back. It is a twisted love triangle that will also show the sometimes brutal side of arranged marriages. It's not clear if their marriage will survive Yusef's meddling. [...] Yusef obviously wants [Zainab] back and will do anything he can to drive a wedge between Masood and Zainab." Ganatra said that Yusef will turn "very manipulative and very nasty" and Masood finds him as a big threat, saying, "He throws a real spanner in the works for Masood. [...] He is doing everything he can to wreck Masood's life, really, and the way you do that is to get to his family. It's a very clever way of doing things—it's not about destroying his family, it's about winning his family and turning them against him, so that Masood is left isolated and on his own." Ganatra spoke of the storyline, saying, "I think there's rumours of revenge! Yusef is a really nice catalyst—he's a very exciting character to throw into the mix. If it goes that way, it's more drama for us to play." The scenes were broadcast on 2 June 2011 with Phil Mitchell also taking revenge alongside Masood.

==== Domestic violence ====
In late 2011, Yusef manages to win his former wife back. They later make plans to get married. Nina Wadia explains why Zainab is willing to forgive Yusef. Wadia said to Inside Soap: "He tells Zainab that he was forced to start the fire by his family. Yusef goes on to explain that he knew it was wrong the minute he lit the match, and that he ran into the house to save her. And by the end of this conversation, she finds herself saying to him, 'Let's get married'—regardless! Obviously, it was something I struggled to get my head around. But being burnt in that fire is what they both have in common—and that experience connects them so deeply. She recognises that he made a mistake, but also decides that the whole thing was probably her fault because she walked out on their marriage." Wadia continued: "It doesn't look like Zainab's going to listen. But as Denise leaves, it's clear she's torn about what to do." A short time before their wedding day arrives, Yusef starts to abuse Zainab both physically and mentally. He forbids Zainab to leave the house and later starts using her son, Kamil, to control her. Wadia explains that she wants the storyline to have a positive impact on real-life violence. She told BBC News: "I think the idea behind showing a strong woman like Zainab changing like this is to show that it can happen to even the strongest of women. They can change and they can be manipulated—especially if they're isolated from their friends and family. The manipulator can take advantage, so it's to prove that it can even happen to people like her. To be honest, if even one woman rings that Action Line at the end of the show and there's some difference made to her life, I'll feel like we've done our job," she continued. "It is a serious issue and I'm glad it's being highlighted. I hope that it wakes anyone up—not just women, I know that there are abused men out there as well. So if it gives anyone the strength to leave a relationship like that, we'll have done our job." The scenes where Yusef refused to let Zainab see Kamil pulled in 8.69 million viewers at 7.30pm. BBC Three's repeat of the episode later secured 994,000 thousand viewers at 10pm.

Wadia admitted to feeling "emotionally drained" after her scenes with Ace Bhatti. She explained to The People: "It's very draining. I'm putting myself into this very dark place which I know sadly is a reality for so many women. Zainab's confidence has been steadily eroded. She's feeling isolated and has fallen under Yusef's control. He wants revenge. She is totally in his power. I had to show this can happen to any woman, no matter how strong she seems. Zainab was strong and not naive, but a woman is vulnerable if the man hits the right psychological weak spots. But both Ace and I have found it hard to do. I've known Ace for a long time and we're good friends. He has been wonderful to work with on this and very concerned about me all the way through." Wadia has been given advice on the storyline from the Roshni refuge in Birmingham, which specializes in abuse within Asian families.

Wadia warns that Yusef will ultimately get worse as time progresses. She said to Inside Soap: "I was filming out on location recently with Ace and a bunch of women came over to him and said, 'God, you're such a horrible man!' It's funny because Ace is such a sweet man—and you haven't even seen the worst of Yusef yet!" Wadia continued: "Let's just say that what happens is the complete opposite of what you want to see. Zainab and Yusef share a dark and twisted love, and she definitely has feelings for him. It's not true and pure like what she used to have with Masood—and if Yusef manages to get her back to Pakistan, it will be the end for her. I wouldn't be surprised if Zainab ends up in some sort of home to recover from everything that's going to happen."

""At first, Masood is quite suspicious of Zainab and thinks that she's trying to stop him from seeing Kamil. But when he talks to Denise, he starts to see things differently. It's been really, really good to work with Diane Parish as Masood doesn't often get to mix with the other characters."

— Nitin Ganatra describes Masood's reaction to Zainab's abuse

Nitin Ganatra who plays Masood Ahmed explains to Digital Spy Masood's reactions when he discovers that Yusef has taken Kamil away. "Masood goes crazy over this!" Nitin replies. "I've got kids myself, and I know I'd react the same way if I found out that some other guy had taken my child to somebody's house who the child doesn't even know. Masood is still the only person who can see Yusef for what he really is, so he goes into a blind panic over the situation. Masood calls in the police, and they make sure that Kamil is safe, but we're left to wonder if he will stay that way. The police say that they can't get involved in domestic disputes, so Masood says, 'Well, what about the father's rights? If a mother reported this, you'd see it as kidnap'. I thought that was a great line and really interesting—I think in that moment, Masood's representing a lot of fathers who have separated or divorced and don't have access to their children in the same way."

Asked what Masood's reactions are to Zainab's abuse, Nitin says: "Masood tells Denise, 'It's just another one of Zainab's dramas', but then there comes a point where he sees bruises on Zainab. Then Masood becomes very concerned for Zainab in a very genuine way. It also might reignite something between the two of them as well, as they have to work together to solve these problems." The scenes showing Masood and Denise racing to the café where Kamil was raised 8.26 million viewers. BBC Three's repeat screening later secured 781k viewers at 10pm.

== Storylines ==
Yusef first appears when Afia introduces him to her boyfriend Tamwar Masood (Himesh Patel). Tamwar feels he is not good enough for Afia in Yusef's eyes as he is from a poor background, but Yusef says that is not relevant and approves of Tamwar. After Tamwar mentions his mother, Zainab Masood's name, Yusef visits the Masood home and finds the door open. When Zainab sees him, she screams and orders him out. It is revealed they were husband and wife from an arranged marriage when Yusef was 17, and Yusef's family had poured oil on her and set her on fire. Yusef says it was his family, not him, and he attempted to save her, revealing bad scarring on his body. Tamwar's father, Masood Ahmed (Nitin Ganatra), Tamwar and Afia return home, and Masood attacks Yusef, punching him twice. After Yusef returns, Tamwar asks Masood to speak to Yusef, and when he visits, he finds out Tamwar and Afia are still seeing each other. He gives his blessing for them to be married.

Yusef becomes the local general practitioner for Walford and takes an interest in Denise Fox (Diane Parish). He is later pickpocketed by Janine Malloy (Charlie Brooks). Denise tells Yusef that there have been rumours about him going around, Dot Branning (June Brown) is responsible, so he goes and talks to Dot; she ignores him. Zainab tells Yusef that Afia will be welcome to the family, but he will not. Yusef reminisces about the past, leading to Zainab telling Masood they must stop the wedding. Yusef starts a relationship with Denise.

Yusef encourages Zainab and Masood's estranged son Syed Masood (Marc Elliott) to take the first step in making amends as he is gay, and Syed goes to Tamwar and Afia's mangni (engagement party). The roof collapses and Syed is hospitalised and Yusef lies to Zainab that Syed could die, so she visits him, but his injuries were not serious, noticing that Yusef tricked her.

Yusef later convinces a very exhausted Zainab to take sleeping pills to help her rest. While she is sleeping he stands by the window to ensure that Masood sees him standing in their home.

Yusef makes out that he is sleeping with Zainab so Masood and Phil Mitchell (Steve McFadden) then kidnap Yusef in an attempt to scare him away. Masood threatens to pour petrol over Yusef, though it is only water and leaves him unharmed. When Masood returns home, Yusef has cuts on his face and blames it on Masood. Everyone believes Yusef, and Masood is rejected from his home. Yusef convinces Tamwar, Afia and Zainab that Masood should not be at the mehndi. At the wedding, Masood turns up to try to stop it, but Tamwar reveals that he and Afia already married.

Yusef continues to manipulate Zainab into believing that Masood is spiraling out of control. As a result the family shuns Masood and turns him away.

After hearing news that Syed is trying to find his wife Amira Shah (Preeya Kalidas), Yusef visits her father, Qadim (Ramon Tikaram) at his office and offers to avenge his family for causing Amira pain. When Zainab and Yusef attend an event together, people assume they are married and Zainab does not correct them. Afterward, Yusef admits to Zainab that he has great feelings for her, but they should maintain some distance as she is married. Yusef continues to manipulate Zainab and ply her with pills, but she says she wishes to stop taking them, so Yusef crushes up a bottle of pills and conceals them in Zainab's food. Zainab passes out and is hospitalised, with her family believing she took a deliberate overdose, as was Yusef's plan. Concerned that he himself is causing Zainab's worries, Masood divorces Zainab by saying the triple talaq.

Yusef learns that Amira gave birth to Syed's daughter Yasmin, so persuades Zainab to take a holiday with him and Kamil in Pakistan. While there, he suggests that they move there permanently as a family. On their return to Walford, Yusef learns that Amira has been seeing Syed, so tells Amira that she is not wanted by the Masood family. Amira ignores him and Zainab meets Yasmin, and informs Yusef that she cannot leave Walford after becoming a grandmother. Yusef then puts doubt into the mind of Syed's boyfriend, Christian Clarke (John Partridge), about Syed's paternity of Yasmin. Christian then asks Yusef to perform a secret paternity test on Yasmin; however, Yusef uses his own DNA for the test, creating a false result. However, his falsification is exposed, leaving the Masood family hostile towards him, and Zainab devastated. Later, Yusef tells Zainab that he told the lies to protect her. She is sceptical, but when Yusef revives Amy Mitchell (Natalia and Kamil Lipka-Kozanka) who has almost drowned, Zainab is impressed with Yusef's caring attitude, but says it does not change things.

Amira goes to Yusef for help, saying she needs him on her side, threatening to tell Zainab that Yusef bought her a plane ticket if he does not help her get Syed back. She convinces Zainab to talk to Yusef, and when Yusef sees 15-year-old Ben Mitchell (Joshua Pascoe), who has recently come out as homosexual, running out of Christian's flat, he asks if Christian acted inappropriately. At first, Ben says nothing happened, but later Ben tells Yusef that Christian touched him, and they tell Ben's father, Phil. This turns out to be untrue, but leads to Christian leaving Syed and Walford.

Yusef continues to manipulate Zainab, to the point of becoming violent with her. Yusef then tries to encourage Zainab to move to Pakistan, and recruits Amira to manipulate Syed with the same idea. As Zainab starts to disrespect his wishes, Yusef slaps her and apologises as he thought he was going to lose her.

Yusef's cousin Tariq (Antony Bunsee) arrives, and he reveals to Yusef that he knows Yusef started the fire that burnt Zainab.

Yusef meets up with Tariq and offers him his daughter's restaurant. Upon discovering that the restaurant doesn't belong to Yusef, he reveals to Afia that Yusef started the fire involving Zainab. Afia then tells Yusef she knows he started the fire and threatens to tell Zainab if he does not do so first. Yusef admits to Zainab that he started the fire and she kicks him out of the house. She later forgives Yusef, and tells Afia that she deserved what happened to her when he started the fire, because he had been her husband and she had cheated on him. Yusef and Zainab then marry again.

After Zainab and Jane argue in the street, Zainab and Yusef return home. Zainab slaps Yusef after he says Kamil will be an outcast to him, but Yusef slaps Zainab back. Yusef then hastily arranges a flight for himself, Zainab and Kamil to Pakistan, but Zainab purposefully discards her passport to prevent the trip. Yusef then kidnaps Kamil, telling Zainab that he is being kept in a safe place, and refuses to let Zainab see him. After about four days of not knowing, Yusef takes Zainab to a café in the High Street, where a relative returns Kamil to Zainab. During the visit, it emerges that Yusef told Bushra's family that Zainab had a nervous breakdown, which is why he needed to have Kamil looked after. When Yusef takes a call outside the café, Zainab tries to escape with Kamil through an emergency exit in the back of the shop. However, Yusef guessed her plan and was waiting for her outside the exit. As she tried to escape, Yusef warned her that he knows everything, and if she leaves him, he will kill Tamwar and Kamil. Masood races to the restaurant and secretly promises that he'll do whatever it takes to get her out of her marriage to Yusef. Zainab finally stands up to Yusef and refuses to leave for Pakistan. Yusef attacks her and, after learning that Masood has Kamil, retaliates towards her. Yusef drugs Zainab, and the family returns to the house. Masood punches Yusef before calling the police. Afia confronts Yusef and orders him to leave. Yusef is later found by Masood at the bed and breakfast with a match and some petrol. Yusef attacks Masood and lights a fire, leaving Masood for dead. Shirley Carter (Linda Henry) and Christian put the fire out, but the fire is later reignited, trapping Masood, Phil and Denise inside. Yusef taunts Zainab outside. Zainab lies and tells him that Afia is in the building, and he runs in, followed by Tamwar. Masood is later rescued and as Yusef remains upstairs, he realises that Afia is, in fact, outside. Realising Zainab tricked him, he briefly smiles, and the floor collapses beneath him, and he succumbs to the flames. The following day, firefighters retrieved his body. He leaves everything to Zainab in his will.

== Reception ==
In May 2011, Bhatti was nominated in the Best Newcomer category at the TV Quick Awards, and the storyline where he tries to destroy the Masoods' marriage was nominated for Best Storyline. Bhatti was surprised to hear that Yusef is liked mainly by women, but in an interview with the Daily Mirror, he admits that he is nothing like Yusef in real life. BBC News branded Yusef as "Zainab's sinister first husband", elsewhere, Metro.co.uk described Yusef as a "deceptive doctor". Jane Simon of the Daily Mirror said that Zainab sending Yusef into the blazing building was a "stroke of genius". Simon also said that it's unknown what Yusef is hoping to achieve with his "one-man reign of terror. Being married to a woman he can't stand, with a son he doesn't want." She added: "It doesn't sound like much of a game-plan."

== See also ==
- List of fictional doctors
- List of soap opera villains
