= Ace Bhatti =

British actor

- Born: Ahsen Rafiq Bhatti; Nottingham, England
- Occupation: Actor
- Years active: 1984–present
- Notable work: The Sarah Jane Adventures, Cold Blood, EastEnders

Ahsen Rafiq "Ace" Bhatti is a British actor. Early in his career, he appeared in the BBC series Cardiac Arrest (1994–1995), Holding On (1997), NCS: Manhunt (2001–2002), and New Street Law (2006–2007), as well as the ITV series Cold Blood (2005–2008). He had a recurring role in the Doctor Who spin-off The Sarah Jane Adventures (2008–2011) and played Yusef Khan in the soap opera EastEnders (2010–2011).

== Early life and education ==
Bhatti was born in Nottingham. He trained at the London Academy of Music and Dramatic Art.

== Career ==
Bhatti began acting at age fourteen starring in the children series Dramarama, however it wasn't until the nineties until he furthered his career, for which he appeared in the British soap opera Family Pride, Band of Gold, Holding On, and most notably as Dr Rajesh Rajah in Cardiac Arrest, among many other television roles during this time. In 2002, Bhatti made a brief appearance in Bend It Like Beckham, played the central character Dave in BBC Three's dark comedy Grease Monkeys (2003), and played flashy Ash Aslan in 2006's New Street Law. In 2007, he took on a minor role for two episodes in the first series of Secret Diary of a Call Girl as Ashok, a regular client of the main character, Belle. He reappeared in 2010 in the same role. In 2008, Bhatti appeared as a supporting character in the second series of The Sarah Jane Adventures, and reprised his role for the third series in 2009, the fourth series in 2010 and in the fifth series in 2011. Although credited in his early career by his birth name Ahsen Bhatti, Bhatti changed his professional name to Ace Bhatti (Ace is a childhood nickname). In 2011, he played Commander Khokar in the BBC2 series The Shadow Line.

In April 2013, Bhatti became a patron of Theatre Royal Wakefield. In 2018, he played Freddie Mercury's father Bomi Bulsara in the biopic Bohemian Rhapsody.

=== EastEnders ===
In 2010, Bhatti was cast as Yusef Khan, the father of already established character Afia Masood (Meryl Fernandes). Bhatti was already known to EastEnders executive producer Bryan Kirkwood when he auditioned for the part, as Kirkwood and Bhatti worked on Coronation Street at the same time. Bhatti was the only actor who auditioned for the part of Yusef. In fact, Wadia recommended Bhatti to Kirkwood to play Yusef, as she "thought that he definitely had the quality that Yusef would need—which is a very ambiguous but charming quality!" Bhatti explained to Digital Spy that the EastEnders cast are very welcoming. He explained: "They're so welcoming. There's a lot of joking about. I'm having a great time at EastEnders - it's a real privilege to be here. I've known Nitin and Nina Wadia, who plays Zainab, for a very long time and we've always got on very well. Nitin and I play tense scenes together so it's nice that we can have a laugh afterwards." He featured in a domestic violence storyline in late 2011 with co-star Nina Wadia who plays Yusef's wife Zainab. Yusef starts to abuse Zainab both physically and mentally. He forbids Zainab to leave the house and later starts using her son, Kamil, to control her. Wadia explains that she wants the storyline to have a positive impact against real-life violence. She told BBC News: "I think the idea behind showing a strong woman like Zainab changing like this is to show that it can happen to even the strongest of women. They can change and they can be manipulated - especially if they're isolated from their friends and family. The manipulator can take advantage, so it's to prove that it can even happen to people like her. To be honest, if even one woman rings that Action Line at the end of the show and there's some difference made to her life, I'll feel like we've done our job," she continued. "It is a serious issue and I'm glad it's being highlighted. I hope that it wakes anyone up - not just women, I know that there are abused men out there as well. So if it gives anyone the strength to leave a relationship like that, we'll have done our job." The scenes where Yusef refused to let Zainab see Kamil pulled in 8.69m viewers at 7.30pm. BBC Three's repeat of the episode later secured 994k viewers at 10pm.

== Filmography ==
=== Film ===
Key
†	Denotes films that have not yet been released

Year	Title	Role	Notes
1995	Brothers in Trouble	Irshad	
1997	Sixth Happiness	Cyrus	
2002	Bend It Like Beckham	Nairobi Grandson	
2004	The Secret of Year Six	Abdul	Short film
2009	Wish 143	Consultant	Short film
2010	It's a Wonderful Afterlife	Tej	
2010	My Lad	Aziz	Short film
2015	Amar Akbar & Tony	Doctor Kumar	
2018	The Academy	Rayner	Short film
2018	Free Dance	Ravi	aka High Strung Free Dance
2018	Bohemian Rhapsody	Bomi Bulsara	
2019	Break Clause	Kadir	
2022	We've Only Just Begun	Goldie	Short film
2023	Runs in the Family	Varun Chetty	
TBA	Blueberry Inn †	Alfred	Post-production

=== Television ===
Year	Title	Role	Notes
1984	Dramarama	Eddie	Episode 2.8: "Josephine Jo"
1991–1992	Family Pride	Suresh	Unknown episodes
1993	The Bill	Rajik Patel	Episode 9.44: "Bedfellows"
1994	Finney	McDade's Minder	4 episodes
1994–1996	Cardiac Arrest	Dr. Rajesh Rajah	Series 1–3; 27 episodes
1995	The Ghostbusters of East Finchley	DI Cunliffe	2 episodes
1995	The Adventures of Young Indiana Jones: Treasure of the Peacock's Eye	Indian Lieutenant	Television film
1995–1996	Band of Gold	Dez	5 episodes
1997	The Bill	Salman Malik	Series 13; 2 episodes: "Shades of Grey: Parts 1 & 2"
1997	Holding On	Zahid	Mini-series; 8 episodes
1998	Verdict	Sanjay Mehta, QC	Episode 1.3: "The Doctor's Opinion"
1999	Cleopatra	Sceptical Citizen	Mini-series; 2 episodes
1999	Grafters	Tom	Series 2; 5 episodes
1999	Last Christmas	Doctor	Television film
2000	Peak Practice	Specialist	Episode 9.6: "Once Too Often"
2000	Harbour Lights	Ramesh	Episode 2.5: "Storm Damage"
2000	Silent Witness	DCI Ranjeet Naval	Series 5; 2 episodes: "The World Cruise: Parts 1 & 2"
2000	Urban Gothic	Jim Takeshi	Episode 1.4: "Sum of the Parts"
2001	Dalziel and Pascoe	Ravi Ghataura	Episode 6.2: "Home Truths"
2001	Love or Money	Ali	Television film
2001-2002	NCS: Manhunt	DC Johnny Khan	8 episodes
2002	Holby City	Nick Woods	Episode 4.41: "From This Moment On"
2003	The Second Coming	Peter Gupta	Mini-series; 2 episodes
2003	Emmerdale	Bobby Khan	2 episodes
2003–2004	Grease Monkeys	Dave Dhillon	Series 1 & 2; 20 episodes
2004	The Deputy	Nickhall Gangwani	Television film
2004	Bodies	Rajesh Rajah	2 episodes
2004–2006	Coronation Street	Jayesh Parekh	12 episodes
2005	Ultimate Force	Handsome	Episode 3.3: "Class of 1980"
2005	Life Isn't All Ha Ha Hee Hee	Deepak	Mini-series; 3 episodes
2005	Holby City	Andy Fishman	Recurring role; 3 episodes
2005–2008	Cold Blood	DC Ajay Roychowdury	Series 1 & 2; 5 episodes
2006	Bradford Riots	Faisal	Television film
2006	Blue Murder	Saadiq Aziz	Episode 3.3: "The Spartacus Thing"
2006	Goldplated	Haq	4 episodes
2006–2007	New Street Law	Ash Aslan	Series 1 & 2; 10 episodes
2007	Casualty	Andy Fishman	Episode 22.3: "Meltdown"
2007	Frankenstein	Dr. Dhillon	Television film
2007–2008	Secret Diary of a Call Girl	Ashok	Recurring role; 3 episodes
2008	Kiss of Death	Miles Trueman	Television film
2008	The Bill	Sunil Davdra	Series 24; 2 episodes
2008–2011	The Sarah Jane Adventures	Haresh Chandra	Series 2–5; 24 episodes
2009	Casualty	Rafiq	Episode 23.29: "Shields"
2009	New Tricks	Geeten Mistry	Episode 6.3: "Fresh Starts"
2009	Coming Up	Shahid	Episode 7.1: "Adha Cup"
2009	The Fixer	Supari	Episode 2.6
2009	Spooks	Amish Mani	Episode 8.1
2010–2011	EastEnders	Dr. Yusef Khan	95 episodes
2011	The Shadow Line	Commander Khokar	4 episodes
2011	A Dangerous Place to Meet My Family	Himself - Narrator	Television film
2012	Midsomer Murders	Harry Dutta	Episode 15.3: "Written in the Stars"
2013	The Last Witch	Doctor	Television film
2014	Silent Witness	Mousa Rashid	Series 17; 2 episodes: "Commodity: Parts 1 & 2"
2014	Silk	Dani Kakwani	Episode 3.4: "Mother Country"
2014	From There to Here	DI Graves	Mini-series; 2 episodes
2014	Lewis	Rizwan Nooran	Series 8; 2 episodes: "Entry Wounds: Parts 1 & 2"
2014, 2016	In the Club	Vinay	Recurring role; 2 episodes
2015	Father Brown	Syrus	Episode 3.8: "The Lair of the Libertines"
2015	Black Work	DCI Jahan Kapoor	Mini-series; 3 episodes
2015	Jekyll and Hyde	Dr. Vishal Najaran	Mini-series; 3 episodes
2016	Shetland	Calvin Sarwar	Series 3; 3 episodes
2016	Beowulf: Return to the Shieldlands	Harken	4 episodes
2016	DCI Banks	Malik Nadir	Series 5; 4 episodes
2017	Revolting	Various characters	3 episodes
2017	Vera	Stuart Mayfield	Episode 7.2: "Dark Angel"
2017	Versailles	Sultan of Bijapur	Episode 2.6: "The Sands of Time"
2017	Three Girls	Nazir Afzal	Mini-series; 2 episodes
2017	Still Star-Crossed	Venetian Moneylender	Episode 1.2: "The Course of True Love Never Did Run Smooth"
2017	Love, Lies and Records	Mr. Hussain	Episode 1.6
2017	My Pure Land	–	Associate producer
2018	Shakespeare & Hathaway: Private Investigators	Chester Patterson	Episode 1.4: "This Rough Magic"
2018	No Offence	Mayor Kashif Hassan	Series 3; 3 episodes
2018	Hounslow Diaries	Uncle Abdul Azeez	Episode 1.1: "Pilot"
2018	Civilisations	Himself - Presenter	Episode 1.2: "Art and the Sea"
2019	The Feed	Dr. Adu	Episode 1.4
2019–2021	Line of Duty	PCC Rohan Sindwhani	Series 5 & 6; 8 episodes
2020	The Stranger	Parth Kuhalam	Mini-series; 2 episodes
2020–2024	Alex Rider	John Crawley	Series 1–3; 21 episodes
2021	Baptiste	Nadeem	Series 2; 6 episodes
2022	Agatha Raisin	Karim Khan	Episode 4.4: "There Goes the Bride"
2022	The Good Karma Hospital	Jules Fonseca	Series 4; 2 episodes
2022	Sherwood	Vinay Chakarabati	Episode 1.2
2022	Ackley Bridge	Imran Farooqi	Episode 5.6
2023	Midsomer Murders	Richard 'Dickie' Dent	Episode 23.4: "Dressed to Kill"
2023	The Effects of Lying	Naveen	Television film
2023	The Couple Next Door	DC Collins	Episode 1.6: "Crimes of Passion"
2024	Finders Keepers	Adil Kumar	Mini-series; episode 2
2024	McDonald & Dodds	George Sharma	Episode 4.1: "The Rule of Three"
2024	Protection	DCI Arun Kapoor	Mini-series; 5 episodes
2025	Malpractice	Mr. Arun Mansoor	Series 2; 5 episodes
2025	The Hack	Rahul Shah	Mini-series; episode 6
2026	Death in Paradise	Alasdair Hartnell	Episode 15.2

=== Video games ===
Year	Title	Role (voice)	Notes
2017	Dark Souls III: The Ringed City	White-faced Locust	
