= List of EastEnders characters introduced in 2007 =

EastEnders logo

The following is a list of characters that first appeared in the BBC soap opera EastEnders in 2007, by order of first appearance. A new family were introduced in this year, with Zainab Masood (Nina Wadia), Masood Ahmed (Nitin Ganatra), Shabnam Masood (Zahra Ahmadi/Rakhee Thakrar) and Tamwar Masood (Himesh Patel) creating the Masood clan. Heather Trott (Cheryl Fergison) was introduced, and the Mitchell family was extended, with Ronnie Mitchell (Samantha Womack) and Roxy Mitchell (Rita Simons) as a fiery new double act. August saw the arrival of Tanya Branning's (Jo Joyner) drug-addicted sister Rainie Cross (Tanya Franks). Former The Bill actor Scott Maslen joined the soap opera as Jack Branning in October, and Tanya and Max Branning's (Jake Wood) son, Oscar Branning, was born in November.

== DI Kelly ==
DI Kelly
- EastEnders character
- Portrayed by: Ian Burfield
- Duration: 2007–2008, 2010
- First appearance: Episode 3288; 1 January 2007
- Last appearance: Episode 4033; 13 July 2010
In-universe information
- Occupation: Detective Inspector

Detective Inspector Kelly, played by Ian Burfield, is a police detective at Walford Police Station. He is first seen when he investigates the death of Pauline Fowler (Wendy Richard) and subsequently arrests her daughter-in-law Sonia Fowler (Natalie Cassidy) for her murder following the funeral. He arrests May Wright (Amanda Drew) for abducting Summer Swann, and also Phil Mitchell (Steve McFadden) on suspicion of murdering his fiancée Stella Crawford (Sophie Thompson). Kelly appears again when he is investigating Jay Brown's stabbing. Later that year, he investigates the murder of Jase Dyer (Stephen Lord) and interrogates Billy Mitchell (Perry Fenwick) as a key witness. Two years later, he informs Liz Turner (Kate Williams) that a body found in Albert Square is that of her son Owen (Lee Ross), and takes his ex-wife Denise Johnson (Diane Parish) in for questioning. Denise is released without charge. Kelly later informs Denise's family that her car has been discovered abandoned by a canal, and then that the body of a woman was pulled from the canal along with Denise's mobile phone. Lucas identifies the body as Denise's, however, Kelly still believes somebody else was involved in Owen's murder. Actor Ian Burfield had previously played a police detective in 1997, DI Hamilton, and went on to play a third, DCI Peter Arthurs in 2018.

== Derek Evans ==
Derek Evans
- EastEnders character
- Portrayed by: Simon Lowe
- Duration: 2007–2010, 2015–2016
- First appearance: Episode 3322; 1 March 2007
- Last appearance: Episode 5405; 20 December 2016
- Created by: Julia Gilbert
- Introduced by: Diedrick Santer (2007); Dominic Treadwell-Collins (2015)
In-universe information
- Occupation: Social worker

Derek Evans is a social worker, played by Simon Lowe. In March 2007, he visits Bert Atkinson (Dave Hill) and his grandson Jay Brown (Jamie Borthwick), when Bert is trying to get a residency order for Jay to live with him permanently. Jay charms Derek, offering him a cup of tea and talking to him politely, impressing him. In January 2008, Derek visits Tanya Branning (Jo Joyner) and her sister Rainie Cross (Tanya Franks). In October that year, he attempts to sort out Jay's foster care problems when Billy Mitchell (Perry Fenwick) offers to care for him, as Jay does not want Dawn Swann (Kara Tointon) to be his foster mother. Derek inspects the flat above The Queen Victoria public house, and allows Jay to stay with Billy, despite Roxy Mitchell's (Rita Simons) messiness. In July 2009, he visits Denise Wicks (Diane Parish) after Jordan Johnson's (Michael-Joel David Stuart) mother Trina (Sharon Duncan Brewster) reports her to the police, claiming that Denise has been abusing Jordan. In June 2010, he visits Phil Mitchell (Steve McFadden) to assess his family situation involving his children Louise (Brittany Papple) and Ben (Charlie Jones), who has assaulted Jordan. The following month he visits Phil and his mother Peggy Mitchell (Barbara Windsor) to say that Louise's mother Lisa Fowler (Lucy Benjamin) has made an application to see her daughter. Derek explains that the final decision is not up to Phil and Peggy says that Derek is a typical social worker – an interfering, home-wrecking busybody. Derek responds sarcastically and leaves. When Peggy returns Louise to Lisa, they contact Derek again, and when he arrives, Phil steals his bag to get Lisa's address.

In April 2015, Derek visits Kat (Jessie Wallace) and Alfie Moon (Shane Richie) after Kat attempts suicide. Kat refuses to tell Derek why she did it but assures him that it will not happen again. Alfie then tells Derek that he felt he had let Kat down but he would help her get better. Derek is satisfied with this and leaves. In July, he visits Shirley Carter (Linda Henry) and Buster Briggs (Karl Howman) to discuss them gaining custody of their granddaughter, Jade Green (Amaya Edward). Buster informs Derek of his criminal record and Derek tells Shirley that single people can adopt children as well, prompting Shirley to nearly split up with Buster. In May 2016, Derek visits Billy and his partner Honey Mitchell (Emma Barton) after Jay returns to live with them after being convicted of a child sex offence to assess Jay being around their children, Janet (Grace) and Will Mitchell (Freddie Phillips). Billy and Honey insist Jay is innocent but Derek informs them that Jay's contact with their children must be supervised. Derek returns in August after Honey reports Jay to the police for possession of drugs which he had been dealing, to reassess their living arrangements. Derek tells Honey that he is concerned about her children's welfare due to the presence of the drugs and implies that Jay might be a danger to Janet and William, causing Jay to decide to move out of the flat. After Jay's home assessment discovers he is living with an underage Louise (now played by Tilly Keeper) at Phil's house, Derek visits Sharon Mitchell (Letitia Dean) and despite Sharon insisting that she and Phil trust Jay, Derek tells her if Jay does not move out, Louise may have to be taken into care as her needs come first.

== Marco Bianco ==
Marco Bianco
- EastEnders character
- Portrayed by: Bart Ruspoli
- First appearance: Episode 3332; 20 March 2007
- Last appearance: Episode 3400; 16 July 2007
In-universe information
- Occupation: Interior designer

Marco Bianco, played by Bart Ruspoli, is the interior designer who redesigns the flat above The Queen Victoria pub for Peggy Mitchell (Barbara Windsor). He works on the design to renovate the pub itself, after Pat Evans (Pam St Clement) found a flea on the bar, though the regulars think the pub looks the same, and Peggy berates him for it.

Peggy then gets him to do some work for Stella Crawford (Sophie Thompson) and Phil Mitchell's (Steve McFadden) wedding reception. At one stage Marco breaks down crying to Peggy, after his boyfriend left him. Marco also helps Patrick Trueman (Rudolph Walker) mend a fan of his wife Yolande's (Angela Wynter) that Patrick broke by tripping up.

== Anya Covalenco ==
Anya Covalenco
- EastEnders character
- Portrayed by: Olga Fedori
- First appearance: Episode 3344; 9 April 2007
- Last appearance: Episode 3347; 13 April 2007
- Created by: Diederick Santer
In-universe information
- Occupation: Pole dancer
- Sons: Tomas Covalenco

Anya Covalenco (Ukrainian: Аня Коваленко), played by Olga Fedori, is a Ukrainian illegal immigrant, a pole dancer who abandons her month-old baby, Tomas, in a church in Kent for vicar Mary Lavender (Regina Freedman) to look after. Dot Branning (June Brown) later finds the baby, and knowing Reverend Lavender is on holiday, takes Tomas back to Walford, leaving a note in the church with her address on it.

Dot's husband Jim (John Bardon) goes to a pole dancing club, finding a flyer for it with Tomas, to track Anya down, but is told she no longer works there by a hostess he speaks to. As Jim travels back to Walford, Anya arrives at Dot and Jim's house. After shouting at Dot for interfering, Dot offers her a place to stay, and she accepts. Jim, however, does not agree with this, and reports Anya to the immigration authorities. Immigration officers arrive and Jim tells Dot what he has done. Dot takes Anya and Tomas out of the house and hides them in the back of her car. Dot returns to the house and tells immigration that there is nobody there and it must have been a hoax. Dot and Jim then take Anya and Tomas to a church, believing it to be a sanctuary where they will be safe. The immigration officers follow them to the church, where Dot says Anya and Tomas will be safe in a room at the back of the church and could live there. Dot confronts the officers, Paul Jenkins (Simon Quarterman) and Warren Rice (Ewan Bailey) telling them it is a sanctuary and they cannot go through. Rice tells Dot she is wrong about this. Anya eventually decides to give herself up, but tells Jim to take care of Tomas as she now trusts them.

She later writes to Dot in June 2007, telling her to care for her son – not knowing that Tomas is now up for adoption, when Dot realises that she cannot bring up baby Tomas.

== Tomas Covalenco ==
Tomas Covalenco
- EastEnders character
- Portrayed by: Dylan Woolf; Tyler Woolf; Joshua Wing
- First appearance: Episode 3344; 9 April 2007
- Last appearance: Episode 3379; 8 June 2007
- Created by: Diederick Santer
In-universe information
- Mother: Anya Covalenco

Tomas Covalenco (Ukrainian: Томас Коваленко) is a baby that is abandoned on 9 April 2007 by his mother, Anya (Olga Fedori) in a church in Kent, and found by Dot Branning (June Brown). Dot leaves her address on a notice board in the church, and Anya arrives in Walford to collect Tomas on 10 April. She is later arrested by immigration officials Warren Rice (Ewan Bailey) and Paul Jenkins (Simon Quarterman) for being an illegal immigrant, but she does not tell them she has a baby, leaving him with Dot and her husband Jim (John Bardon).

Jim later tells his family that Tomas is the product of an affair between Dot's son Nick Cotton (John Altman) and a prison nurse with no maternal instincts. He is then known as George Merton, until Dot is persuaded by Reverend Stevens (Michael Keating) and her oldest friend, Harold Legg (Leonard Fenton) to tell Social Services that she has him. He is collected on 8 June by social worker Natasha Powell (Natasha Gordon).

== Hazel Hobbs ==
Hazel Hobbs
- EastEnders character
- Portrayed by: Kika Mirylees
- Duration: 2007–2008
- First appearance: Episode 3345; 10 April 2007
- Last appearance: Episode 3566; 24 April 2008
- Created by: Diederick Santer
In-universe information
- Occupation: Cruise ship entertainer
- Sons: Garry Hobbs
- Granddaughters: Vivienne Hobbs
- First cousins: Reg

Hazel Hobbs, played by Kika Mirylees, is the mother of Garry Hobbs (Ricky Groves). She first appears in April 2007, when Garry attends her wedding. Hazel then decides she does not want to marry her fiancé, Gerald (Brian Cowan), because he has too much nasal hair, describing it as "like tusks". She and Garry rush back to Gerald's house to collect her belongings, but Gerald arrives at the house before they leave, and hits Garry, thinking he is Hazel's toyboy. Hazel then stays with Garry in Walford, and falls for his best friend, Minty Peterson (Cliff Parisi). However, this leads to Garry punching Minty, and Hazel leaves Walford.

In August 2007, it is revealed that Hazel and Minty have started a relationship behind Garry's back. They take a romantic weekend in Brighton, but do not know that Garry is also there with Dawn Swann (Kara Tointon). Garry finds out they are seeing each other and is outraged. Back in Walford, Minty finds the engagement ring that Garry had used to propose to Dawn (she said no) and bends down to pick it up off the floor. He is on one knee, holding the ring, when Hazel comes in the room, and she assumes that Minty is planning to propose to her and immediately says "Yes, I do". Hazel then starts planning the wedding, and she gets a job as a receptionist at Booty.

Hazel befriends Heather Trott (Cheryl Fergison), who is infatuated with her son Garry. Hazel then asks an elated Heather to be her bridesmaid at her upcoming wedding to Minty, to which she accepts. After fainting at work, Hazel starts to believe she is pregnant. Minty buys lots of things for the baby, but Hazel tearfully reveals on in February 2008 that it is the menopause, and she can never have a baby. Hazel then leaves the square, believing that she would be restricting Minty's future desires to have a family if she stayed with him.

However, Hazel returns on 22 April and proposes to Minty on his wedding morning to Heather. Hazel tells him that they would get married and set for a life on the cruise ships, but he says no and goes after Heather. Hazel then watches as the wedding goes ahead without her, then says goodbye to Garry and leaves. This is her last appearance, but it is mentioned in February 2009 that Hazel is on a cruise ship heading for Monaco.

== Olive Woodhouse ==
Olive Woodhouse
- EastEnders character
- Portrayed by: Sylvia Syms
- Duration: 2007, 2009–2010
- First appearance: Episode 3349; 17 April 2007
- Last appearance: Episode 4037/4038; 20 July 2010
- Introduced by: Diederick Santer
In-universe information
- Occupation: Bridal shop owner Dress fitter

Olive Woodhouse, played by Sylvia Syms, is a friend of Peggy Mitchell's (Barbara Windsor) whom she has known since childhood. She is a dress fitter and first appears fitting Stella Crawford's (Sophie Thompson) wedding dress in April 2007, and criticises her taste, making her angry.

She returns on 5 March 2009 to fit Peggy's wedding dress and she takes an instant dislike to Peggy's niece and future stepdaughter Roxy (Rita Simons). The wedding dress she creates for Peggy is slightly provocative and Peggy's fiancé Archie (Larry Lamb) sees the plans and purposely walks in, seeing Peggy in the dress, making her want to change it in fear of bad luck. She then notices Janine Butcher (Charlie Brooks) following Archie and grows suspicious, thinking they are having an affair. She asks Archie, who then tells her that now they are paying for another dress, he wants to make some changes making the new dress less revealing.

She returns again in 2010, when Peggy, Roxy, Roxy's sister Ronnie (Samantha Womack) and Ronnie and Roxy's mother Glenda (Glynis Barber) arrive at her bridal shop to find a dress for Ronnie's wedding to Jack Branning (Scott Maslen). Olive feels insulted when Roxy insults the dresses. When Ronnie finds a dress she likes, Olive returns with them to The Queen Victoria public house to make adjustments. However, whilst Olive is making the adjustments, Ronnie tears the dress off and runs out of The Queen Vic when the conversation turns to her father.

== Verity Wright ==
Verity Wright
- EastEnders character
- Portrayed by: Amanda Ryan
- First appearance: Episode 3357; 1 May 2007
- Last appearance: Episode 3372; 28 May 2007
- Created by: Diederick Santer
In-universe information
- Sisters: May Wright
- Husband: Richard
- Sons: James
- Daughters: Esther

Verity Wright, played by Amanda Ryan, is the sister of May Wright (Amanda Drew). She visits May with her two children on 1 May 2007, when she finds the nursery in May's flat meant for Dawn Swann's (Kara Tointon) baby, presuming May is pregnant. She later visits May on her birthday, and is shocked to find out that May's husband Rob (Stuart Laing) has filed for divorce. She returns once more on 28 May to visit May and gives her a present for the baby she thinks she is having.

== Manju Patel ==
Manju Patel
- EastEnders character
- Portrayed by: Leena Dhingra
- First appearance: Episode 3359; 4 May 2007
- Last appearance: Episode 3490; 20 December 2007
- Created by: Alexander Lamb
- Introduced by: Diederick Santer
In-universe information
- Occupation: Shopkeeper

Manju Patel is played by Leena Dhingra. Originally a guest character, Mrs Patel's primary purpose was as a plot device in the exit of nurse Naomi Julien, after the actress Petra Letang left the show. However, following her two appearances on 4 May and 21 May 2007, Mrs Patel became popular with fans, to the point where she was called a "cult icon" by Digital Spy soaps editor Kris Green. It was announced on 16 August 2007 that she would be return to the show later in 2007.

Mrs Patel is a patient of Walford's general practitioner, May Wright (Amanda Drew). May writes out a double prescription for her, and takes one of the bottles of dihydrocodeine pills for her own personal use. She later tells nurse Naomi Julien (Petra Letang) that it is a mistake, after Mrs Patel points this out.

Mrs Patel is later mentioned on 9 August 2007 during a telephone conversation between Dot Branning (June Brown) and Charlie Slater (Derek Martin). On 9 November it is revealed that Mrs Patel is Billy Mitchell's (Perry Fenwick) new landlady. She gives him one month's notice to vacate the flat along with his wife Honey (Emma Barton) and baby Janet because she wants a professional couple with no children to live there. Eventually, Mrs Patel decides to evict the couple from the flat. However, Billy changes the locks so Mrs Patel cannot enter. When Billy is out buying nappies, Mrs Patel gets help from her nephews to get into the flat and remove Honey, the children and all their belongings. She offers Billy money as a goodwill gesture, but Billy refuses to accept it.

Though she does not appear again, Manju is mentioned on 13 May 2008 by Shabnam Masood (Zahra Ahmadi) who tells her mother Zainab (Nina Wadia) that she is going to see if Mrs Patel has any new clothes in her Sari shop. On 24 July, Mrs Patel's shop is mentioned by Jane Beale (Laurie Brett) when she is looking to buy some fabric for an Indian lunch that she and husband Ian (Adam Woodyatt) are holding at the café. They buy the material from Mrs Patel after seeing it although Mrs Patel is not seen. Mrs Patel is then mentioned on 24 March 2009 when Syd Chambers (Nina Toussaint-White) announces she is renting 13a Turpin Road, the flat above the bookies from her. In April 2010, she rents the flat to Syed (Marc Elliott) and Amira Masood (Preeya Kalidas). In 2012 she is mentioned by Denise Fox (Diane Parish) and Zainab at Heather Trott's (Cheryl Fergison) funeral service.

== Erek ==
Erek
- EastEnders character
- Portrayed by: Goran Kostić
- First appearance: Episode 3360; 7 May 2007
- Last appearance: Episode 3383; 15 June 2007
- Created by: Diederick Santer
In-universe information
- Occupation: Builder

Erek, played by Goran Kostić, was a Polish builder who first appears on 7 May 2007. Ian Beale (Adam Woodyatt) is annoyed by him and the other builders, and when a feud breaks out between Ian and Phil Mitchell (Steve McFadden), Erek helps Phil to humiliate Ian. He later starts a relationship with Shirley Carter (Linda Henry) but it ends when Shirley's son Deano (Matt Di Angelo) speaks badly about her, Erek punches him and Shirley then punches Erek.

== Warren Stamp ==
Warren Stamp
- EastEnders character
- Portrayed by: Will Mellor
- First appearance: Episode 3372; 28 May 2007
- Last appearance: Episode 3375; 31 May 2007
- Created by: Alison Fisher
- Introduced by: Diederick Santer
In-universe information
- Occupation: Salesman

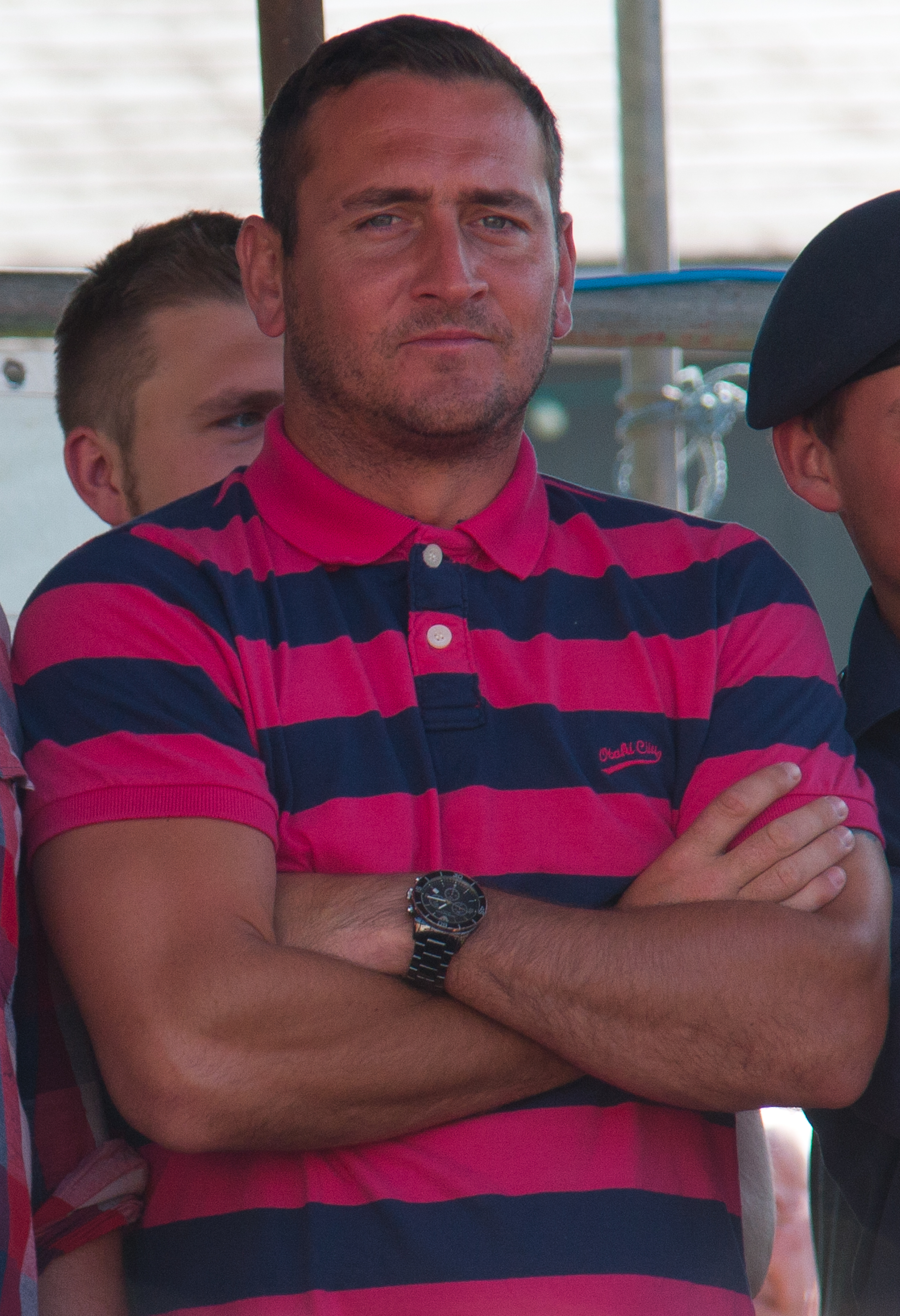
Actor Will Mellor was cast as Warren Stamp.

Warren Stamp, played by Will Mellor, appears in three episodes first broadcast in May.

Warren is a salesman who asks Preeti Choraria (Babita Pohoomull) out on a date after trying to sell her supplies at Booty salon. He assaults Preeti on the date leaving distinct bruises on her arm. A day later, he goes on a date with Carly Wicks (Kellie Shirley) where he puts drugs in her drink in an attempt to rape her. She is rescued by Sean Slater (Robert Kazinsky), and Warren runs away.

== Summer Swann ==
Summer Swann
- EastEnders character
- Portrayed by: Daisy Fitter (2007); Abbie Hackworth (2007); Harry Swash (2007); Isabella & Rebecca Hegarty (2007–2009)
- Duration: 2007–2009
- First appearance: Episode 3386; 21 June 2007
- Last appearance: Episode 3848; 27 August 2009
- Created by: Diederick Santer
In-universe information
- Father: Rob Minter
- Mother: Dawn Swann
- Stepfather: Garry Hobbs
- Grandfathers: Mike Swann
- Grandmothers: Rosie Miller
- Uncles: Mickey Miller; Darren Miller
- Aunts: Demi Miller
- First cousins: Aleesha Miller; George Trott

Summer Swann is the daughter of Dawn Swann (Kara Tointon) and Rob Minter (Stuart Laing). She has been played by on-screen uncle Joe Swash's son, Harry Swash, Abbie Hackworth as well as by Daisy Fitter, and by twins Isabella and Rebecca Hegarty. Along with actors Ricky Groves and Kara Tointon, the character made her final appearance on 27 August 2009.

Summer is born in June 2007 after Dawn goes into premature labour on the tube. Dawn gets to hospital and safely delivers Summer with her friend Carly Wicks (Kellie Shirley) by her side. Dawn initially finds it hard to bond with Summer as she still wants to go out partying. However, during a trip to Brighton in August 2007 with Summer and Garry Hobbs (Ricky Groves), Dawn takes responsibility for Summer and vows to become a proper mother to her. In January 2008, Dawn starts dating Jase Dyer (Stephen Lord), and Summer begins modelling for catalogues after Dawn takes her to an audition. Dawn also enters her for the "Beautiful Baby" competition at The Queen Victoria pub on her first birthday in June 2008. Dawn puts fake tan on Summer for the competition, which she has an allergic reaction to, but she is named runner-up at the competition anyway.

On Summer's birthday, May Wright (Amanda Drew) returns to Walford, intending to kidnap Summer. May was married to Summer's birth father Rob Minter as they were taking a break and he had a brief relationship with Dawn and she got pregnant. May, who is unable to have children, never got over this, especially as during her pregnancy, Dawn agreed that May could adopt Summer. However, Dawn changed her mind and refused to let May take Summer. Upon seeing Summer in fake tan, May brands Dawn a terrible mother before attacking her and her brother Mickey Miller (Joe Swash) and then trying to leave with Summer, whom she calls Sophie. However, Mickey snatches Summer back and locks May out of the bedroom, leaving May trying to break down the door, screaming for Summer. Devastated, May goes down to the kitchen and blows the house up by lighting a cigarette in the kitchen while the gas cooker was on. Mickey then tries to throw Summer out the window but he drops her when he passes out and Jase catches her. Summer was unharmed. In July 2008, it is revealed that Jase has adopted Summer, (Dawn did not put Rob's name on Summer's birth certificate as she registered the birth alone and was not married to Rob).

More tragedy strikes for Dawn and Jase when Jase is murdered in August 2008 by members of a gang he used to be in. Being in Walford after Jase's death proves too much for Dawn and in September 2008, she and Summer join her family in the Cotswolds. Dawn returns to Walford in October 2008 for Jase's funeral and is adamant that she is returning to the Cotswolds, but she is eventually persuaded by Garry to stay in Walford. Dawn and Summer move in with Garry, Minty Peterson (Cliff Parisi) and Callum Monks (Elliott Jordan). Dawn and Garry start dating but Dawn has an affair with Phil Mitchell (Steve McFadden). Garry finds out but decides to give Dawn another chance and they leave Walford together with Summer, sailing on a boat, in August 2009.

== Kenny Morris ==
Kenny Morris
- EastEnders character
- Portrayed by: Ryan Philpott
- Duration: 2007–2009, 2011, 2015, 2023
- First appearance: Episode 3388; 25 June 2007
- Last appearance: Episode 6692; 4 May 2023
- Introduced by: Diedrick Santer (2007); Bryan Kirkwood (2011); Dominic Treadwell-Collins (2015); Kate Oates and Chris Clenshaw (2023)
In-universe information
- Occupation: Police officer

Sergeant Kenny Morris, played by Ryan Philpott, is a police officer who is originally introduced as a police constable, but later becomes a sergeant. He is first seen as an associate of Ian Beale (Adam Woodyatt), who Ian gives free food to in his café, in return for an occasional police presence. He is later called to Shirley Carter's (Linda Henry) flat when a party is getting out of hand. He breaks up a fight and is almost hit by Shirley, however, he ends up staying the night and having sex with her.

He later appears in September 2007, after Patrick Trueman (Rudolph Walker) is attacked by Craig Dixon (Rory Jennings), and Chelsea Fox (Tiana Benjamin) and Deano Wicks (Matt Di Angelo) try to frame Sean Slater (Robert Kazinsky) for the crime. In November 2007, Kevin Wicks (Phil Daniels) unknowingly sells Morris a stolen car. When Darren Miller (Charlie G. Hawkins) tells Kevin that the car is stolen and that Morris is a police officer, they steal the car from Morris and set it on fire. In October 2008, Morris visits Stacey Slater's (Lacey Turner) stall after Ronnie Mitchell (Samantha Womack) calls the market inspector about her selling stolen clothes. He later appears when Dawn Swann (Kara Tointon) accuses Jay Brown (Jamie Borthwick) of trying to set fire to her house. He appears again when Max Branning (Jake Wood) calls the police following a faked burglary at his home. On 12 January 2009, Morris appears when he and a colleague find Danielle Jones (Lauren Crace) sleeping rough on Albert Square.

On 15 January 2009 he appears when the police receive complaints of a protest outside Gilly's Massage Parlour. On 7 January 2011 he visits Phil Mitchell (Steve McFadden) after his son Ben (Joshua Pascoe) has been accused of pushing Glenda Mitchell (Glynis Barber) down her stairs. Morris later visits Glenda to take a statement from her. He visits Phil again in October 2011, after his car is vandalised with graffiti. Phil demands a crime reference number from Morris who mocks Phil along with his colleague.

In July 2015, he appears at the police station when Ben (now Harry Reid) is arrested for the murder of Lucy Beale (Hetti Bywater). He tells DCI Jill Marsden (Sophie Stanton) that witness Arsim Kelmendi (Tomasz Aleksander) has arrived at the station and escorts Ben back to his cell. He is later on desk duty when Ritchie Scott (Sian Webber) arrives and asks for Ben's whereabouts. Morris is on the phone and tells her to wait but she ignores him and goes into the station. Morris is forced to apologise to Marsden for not stopping her and she tells him to escort Ritchie back to the front desk. He is also present when Phil arrives at the police station and Morris asks him to wait. Bobby Beale (Eliot Carrington) later comes to the police station and asks to see DI Samantha Keeble (Alison Newman) but Morris is taking another phone call and tells him to wait too. Morris later informs Marsden that Phil has returned to the station and wants to see her.

In November 2015, Morris visits Denise Fox (Diane Parish) and tells her that a person the police have in custody has given her address as theirs. She confirms to Morris all of the people who live in her house. Denise then tries to find out from Morris who the arrested person is, and although he is unable to tell her, she realises it is her former stepson Jordan Johnson (Joivan Wade).

== Heather Trott ==
Heather Trott, played by Cheryl Fergison, is first introduced as a guest character, but later becomes a regular. The sidekick of character Shirley Carter (Linda Henry), most of Heather's storylines involve comedy, and Fergison won the 'Funniest Performance' award at the 2008 Inside Soap Awards. Heather's character is known for her headbands, love of cheese and karaoke, and being a fan of singer George Michael. In 2009, Heather is involved in a whodunnit-style storyline when she becomes pregnant by an unknown man. Several characters are possibilities, and the father, teenager Darren Miller (Charlie G. Hawkins) is revealed after the baby, George Trott, is born.

== Charity Kase ==
Charity Kase
- EastEnders character
- Portrayed by: Morgan Crowley
- Duration: 2007, 2009
- First appearance: Episode 3396; 9 July 2007
- Last appearance: Episode 3898; 24 November 2009
In-universe information
- Occupation: Drag artist

Karl "Charity Kase", played by Morgan Crowley, is an Irish drag act employed by Peggy Mitchell (Barbara Windsor) for a night in The Queen Victoria public house. He sings "Big Spender" to Billy Mitchell (Perry Fenwick) and Bradley Branning (Charlie Clements), makes Bradley go up on stage and repeat his proposal to Stacey Slater (Lacey Turner) in front of the audience, and sings a duet with barmaid Shirley Carter (Linda Henry). After being told by Sean Slater (Robert Kazinsky), he dresses up Deano Wicks (Matt Di Angelo) and makes a fool of him.

He later appears when Shirley is in Brighton with her best friend Heather Trott (Cheryl Fergison) and they run into him. He offers them a lift back to Walford because their car has been clamped.

In 2009, Kim Fox (Tameka Empson) books him for her sister Denise Wicks's (Diane Parish) wedding to Lucas Johnson (Don Gilet).

== Zainab Masood ==
Zainab Masood, played by Nina Wadia, is first seen as the owner of Walford Post Office, and employer of Denise Wicks (Diane Parish). Zainab is the mother of Shabnam (Zahra Ahmadi), Tamwar (Himesh Patel) and Syed Masood (Marc Elliott), and is the wife of Masood Ahmed (Nitin Ganatra). Zainab and Masood stay strong through various family difficulties, and Zainab gives birth to another son, Kamil in 2010, but their joy is short-lived as Syed soon admits that he is gay. When Zainab's ex-husband Yusef Khan (Ace Bhatti) arrives, this ultimately leads to her divorcing Masood, and she later remarries Yusef. He abuses her and is killed, leaving her a widow.

== Shabnam Masood ==
Shabnam Masood, played by Zahra Ahmadi, is the daughter of Zainab Masood (Nina Wadia) and Masood Ahmed (Nitin Ganatra), and the sister of Tamwar (Himesh Patel) and Syed Masood (Marc Elliott). A university graduate, she has not yet decided what career path she wants to follow and works in her parents' posy office in the meantime. She has aspirations to travel and makes secret plans to leave Walford, but she is forced to rethink when she discovers her parents are having financial difficulties. Shabnam struggles with the clash between her family's traditional Muslim culture and modern British life, and after her mother catches her poledancing in a club, Shabnam starts to feel confused about where she belongs. In 2014, Shabnam returned to Walford, this time played by Rakhee Thakrar.

== Myra Sim ==
Myra Sim
- EastEnders character
- Portrayed by: Naomi Ryan
- Duration: 2007, 2009
- First appearance: Episode 3401; 17 July 2007
- Last appearance: Episode 3920; 28 December 2009
In-universe information
- Occupation: Police officer

Police Constable Myra Sim, played by Naomi Ryan, is a police officer who investigates Wellard's kidnapping. She speaks to Mickey Miller (Joe Swash) and Gus Smith (Mohammed George), and finds the recently departed Li Chong's (Elaine Tan) stash of dodgy mobile phones. Mickey asks her not to tell Gus about the phones, which she does not. When Bert Atkinson (Dave Hill) later plasters posters of Wellard around Walford, she deals with a complaint about them, telling Gus to take them down or he will be fined.

She appears again on 26 and 28 December 2009 following the murder of Archie Mitchell (Larry Lamb), questioning Bradley Branning (Charlie Clements) and Stacey Slater (Lacey Turner). She is also present at the police station and takes Ronnie Mitchell's (Samantha Womack) clothes from her for forensic analysis after she is arrested for the murder.

== Jase Dyer ==
Jase Dyer, played by Stephen Lord, is the father of Jay Brown (Jamie Borthwick). He arrives in Walford to reunite with his estranged son. Jase quickly bonds with Jay, and soon replaces Bert Atkinson (Dave Hill) as his guardian. It is revealed that Jase used to be in a gang of football hooligans led by Terry Bates (Nicholas Ball), and his involvement led to him spending time in prison. After a brief fling with Roxy Mitchell (Rita Simons), Jase starts a relationship with Dawn Swann (Kara Tointon) and becomes engaged to her. However Jase finds his gang-related past hard to break free from.

== Roxy Mitchell ==
Roxy Mitchell, played by Rita Simons, arrives in Walford with her sister Ronnie (Samantha Womack). Described as the "fire", as opposed to Ronnie's "ice",

== Ronnie Mitchell ==
Ronnie Mitchell, played by Samantha Womack, arrives in Walford with her sister Roxy (Rita Simons). Described as the "ice", as opposed to Roxy's "fire", Ronnie takes over Scarlet nightclub and forms a relationship with her business partner, Jack Branning (Scott Maslen). However Ronnie finds it difficult to move on from the years of manipulation and abuse she suffered from her father, Archie Mitchell (Larry Lamb).

== Craig Dixon ==
Craig Dixon
- EastEnders character
- Portrayed by: Rory Jennings
- First appearance: Episode 3407; 27 July 2007
- Last appearance: Episode 3431; 7 September 2007
- Introduced by: Diederick Santer

Craig Dixon, played by Rory Jennings, arrives in Albert Square for an interview with Ian Beale (Adam Woodyatt), to work in Ian's chip shop. Ian employs Craig, and Craig goes on to secretly date Ian's daughter, Lucy (Melissa Suffield). It is soon revealed that Craig has a gun in the glove compartment of his car. Lauren Branning (Madeline Duggan) invites him and Lucy to her house and they play truth or dare. Craig and Lucy leave when they are interrupted by Lauren's sister, Abi (Lorna Fitzgerald). Craig later dares Lucy to shoplift from the Minute Mart. Craig also has a minor disagreement with Patrick Trueman (Rudolph Walker) when purchasing alcohol from the Minute Mart when Patrick asks him for proof of age much to the annoyance of Craig, who shows him his passport, proving he is 18 years old. Patrick is attacked soon after.

Ian finds out about Lucy and Craig dating from his wife Jane (Laurie Brett) and Lauren at a party. Ian rushes to find Lucy and Max Branning (Jake Wood) offers to help. Ian and Max find Lucy and Craig in bed at Craig's flat. Craig is warned by Max whilst Lucy is told to button her top and get out. The next day after taking Lucy home, Ian reports the incident to the police and Craig is cautioned, much to Ian's annoyance. He visits Craig and gives him £300 to leave his daughter alone. Lucy and Craig later meet in secret. It is later revealed that it was Craig who attacked Patrick. A tape discovered by Kevin Wicks (Phil Daniels), shows him hitting Patrick over the head. Sean Slater (Robert Kazinsky), who had also disagreed with Patrick, is charged with the crime. On the same day, it is revealed that Craig and Lucy have got back together. When Lucy plays truant, she goes to see Craig and gets into his car, almost discovering his gun, but he stops her by saying there is a wasp in her hair and quickly changes the subject.

On 6 September, Craig and Lucy run away to a hotel. When Craig comes out of the shower topless, he makes it clear that he wants to have sex but she throws her drink on him and locks herself in the bathroom. She phones Ian on her mobile but her family have gone looking for her so they never get the call. She leaves a message but it is cut short when her battery runs out. She persuades Craig to leave the hotel by saying they will steal money from Ian. Lucy runs to her father, pretending to cry, and tells the police that Craig attacked Patrick. Craig is arrested for attempted murder and is not seen again, resulting in Sean's freedom. However, Craig hides his gun in Lucy's bag. Steven (Aaron Sidwell), Lucy's half-brother, later attempts to use the gun to shoot himself but instead wounds Jane.

== Rainie Highway ==
Rainie Highway, played by Tanya Franks, is the drug-addicted sister of Tanya Branning (Jo Joyner). As of April 2011, she has had four separate stints in the series, in 2007 (two episodes), 2008 (four episodes), 2010, and 2011 onwards. Rainie has been called "troublesome" and "troubled". Franks said that Rainie would be "unlikely to return without stirring up a bit of trouble". Her most notable storyline is one of getting Phil Mitchell (Steve McFadden) addicted to the drug crack cocaine, which Frank said "gets quite dark and dirty". She was given advice from the charity DrugScope on how to act the part and also undertook some of her own research. The storyline attracted several complaints.

== Ellen Dunn ==
Ellen Dunn
- EastEnders character
- Portrayed by: Phillipa Peak
- First appearance: Episode 3413; 7 August 2007
- Last appearance: Episode 3431; 7 September 2007
In-universe information
- Occupation: Police officer

Detective Sergeant Ellen Dunn, played by Phillipa Peak, is the leading officer investigating the attack on Patrick Trueman (Rudolph Walker). She interrogates Sean Slater (Robert Kazinsky), and later interviews Deano Wicks (Matt Di Angelo) when he is attacked after making a statement against Sean. One month later, she leads a team of officers to arrest Deano and Chelsea Fox (Tiana Benjamin) for attempting to pervert the course of justice.

== Zachary Carson ==
Zachary Carson
- EastEnders character
- Portrayed by: Jonah Russell
- First appearance: Episode 3413; 7 August 2007
- Last appearance: Episode 3416; 13 August 2007
In-universe information
- Occupation: Police officer

Detective Constable Zachary Carson, played by Jonah Russell, is one of the police officers investigating the attack on Patrick Trueman (Rudolph Walker). He collects witness statements from Deano Wicks (Matt Di Angelo) and Chelsea Fox (Tiana Benjamin), who claim they saw Sean Slater (Robert Kazinsky) attack Patrick, and later he interviews Patrick when he regains consciousness, distressing him until Denise Wicks (Diane Parish) tells Carson to leave the hospital. He leaves Patrick his card, and Patrick later telephones him and tells him Sean is the culprit. One month later, the police officers arrest Chelsea and Deano after it has been discovered they are perverting the course of justice.

== Wayne Hughes ==
DC Wayne Hughes
- EastEnders character
- Portrayed by: Jamie Treacher
- Duration: 2007–2010
- First appearance: Episode 3419; 17 August 2007
- Last appearance: Episode 3952; 19 February 2010
In-universe information
- Occupation: Detective Constable

Detective Constable Wayne Hughes, played by Jamie Treacher, is a police officer who interviews Craig Dixon (Rory Jennings) after he had been caught in bed with an underage Lucy Beale (Melissa Suffield). He returns on 18 March 2008 when Lucy runs away from home and leaves again on 28 March when Lucy is found and returns home.

Hughes returns on 28 December 2009, investigating the murder of Archie Mitchell (Larry Lamb). He is the central colleague of DCI Jill Marsden (Sophie Stanton). When a DNA screening begins, Jack Branning (Scott Maslen) pays Hughes a bribe to make the samples disappear. Hughes contacts Jack when his nephew Bradley Branning (Charlie Clements) is about to be arrested. He becomes involved in police chase with Bradley and he watches him fall to his death from the roof of the Queen Victoria Pub.

Actor Jamie Treacher, who plays the character, is the son of former EastEnders actor Bill Treacher, who played original character Arthur Fowler from 1985 to 1996.

== Len Harker ==
Len Harker
- EastEnders character
- Portrayed by: Christopher Ellison
- First appearance: Episode 3420; 20 August 2007
- Last appearance: Episode 3423; 24 August 2007
In-universe information
- Occupation: Rocking horse maker

Len Harker, played by Christopher Ellison, is a man who unknowingly helps Shirley Carter (Linda Henry) and Heather Trott (Cheryl Fergison) to steal a car that Pat Evans (Pam St Clement) borrowed from Kevin Wicks (Phil Daniels). As Shirley and Heather drive away to Brighton, Pat comes out from the service station and calls out that it is her car, but she slips and breaks her shoe. Len mends her broken shoe, and then offers her a lift to Worthing, where she had been heading for.

After Pat accepts, he drives her to a run-down mental facility where Pat's long-lost sister Joan had been sent sixty years previously. After being refused entry, he helps Pat to break in, where they discover that Joan had not died aged 22 as Pat had been told, but had been sent to a different hospital in the 1980s.

However, while running from the police, Len drops the paper which reveals which hospital she had been sent to, but he searches the internet and finds the location. He takes Pat there, where they discover that Joan had only died a few years ago, and that she had married in 1963. He takes Pat back to Walford, where he says goodbye to her, giving her his card, looks around, and then drives away. Len is not heard of again until Christmas Eve 2007, when Pat receives a rocking horse and card from him.

== Damian ==
Damian
- EastEnders character
- Portrayed by: James Hillier
- First appearance: Episode 3424; 27 August 2007
- Last appearance: Episode 3460; 29 October 2007
In-universe information
- Occupation: Businessman

Damian, played by James Hillier, is Roxy Mitchell's (Rita Simons) fiancé, whom she starts avoiding calls from during her stay in Walford. Roxy tells her sister Ronnie (Samantha Womack) she is going to leave Damian and never go back to Ibiza, but Ronnie warns her to wait until she gets the money out of his business. They then both get into an argument over the situation, during which Damian arrives unexpectedly at The Queen Victoria pub. Roxy and Ronnie then trick him into believing Roxy's new boyfriend is Ian Beale (Adam Woodyatt) and that she is pregnant with Ian's baby. Roxy even kisses Ian to prove she loves him, in front of Damian. Damian then leaves to go back to Ibiza.

Two months later, Damian returns to Walford to be with Roxy, who pretends that she had a miscarriage. Roxy tries not to let him know that she is using him only for the money to help Peggy pay off her £40,000 debts and the funds for her and Ronnie's future ownership of the Scarlet nightclub. On 29 October, Damian attacks Ian in the café when he discovers that he and Roxy were never in love, and then gets himself arrested by Jack Branning (Scott Maslen) when he "hits" Ronnie (this is set up by Ronnie, when she makes it look like he was sexually assaulting her). Damian then realises that Roxy does not really love him, but is using him to get the money he owes her. This is the last time he is seen.

== Queenie Trott ==
Queenie Trott
- EastEnders character
- Portrayed by: Judy Cornwell
- Duration: 2007–2008
- First appearance: Episode 3441; 25 September 2007
- Last appearance: Episode 3566; 24 April 2008
In-universe information
- Father: William Trott
- Mother: Holly Trott
- Sisters: Val
- Daughters: Heather Trott
- Grandsons: George Trott

Queenie Trott, played by Judy Cornwell, is the emotionally abusive mother of Heather Trott (Cheryl Fergison). Queenie is a controlling woman, who regularly taunts, insults and demeans her daughter, always calling her by the name "Pig". When Shirley Carter (Linda Henry) asks Heather to move out of her mother's flat and into hers, Queenie manipulates Heather into staying by pretending to have an accident. Heather is so concerned for her mother's safety that she decides not to move out, but she later hears Queenie laughing about her deception to a friend on the phone. Heather is so angry that she decides to move in with Shirley after all, only to find that Shirley has been evicted as she'd failed to pay the rent. Not wanting to remain living with her spiteful mother, Heather decides to pay the rent with money she has in her savings account. When she sneaks back to Queenie's to find her savings book however, she discovers that her mother has stolen most of her money.

Queenie arrives on Heather's doorstep on 16 March 2008 to meet her new fiancé, Minty Peterson (Cliff Parisi). When she discovers that Heather is pretending to be Hazel Hobbs (Kika Mirylees) so they can win a wedding competition in a magazine, Queenie blackmails Minty and Heather, saying she will not leave unless they give her their winnings from the competition. Heather reveals to Minty that Queenie had told her that her father walked out on them because he hated living with Heather. Minty then encourages Heather to stand up to Queenie, which she does, prompting Queenie to leave. Queenie later tries to stop Minty and Heather's wedding, revealing Heather's true identity to Marni (Lisa Ellis) from the magazine. Heather marries Minty anyway and later berates Queenie for trying to ruin her happiness, and Queenie leaves.

When Heather gives birth to a baby boy named George in 2009, she phones Queenie to let her know that she is a grandmother, but is unsurprisingly let down by her mother's response. In 2011, Heather tries to visit Queenie but a neighbour tells her that Queenie has moved to Eastbourne a few years before. When Heather is murdered in 2012, Queenie does not attend her funeral. In 2015, it was revealed that Shirley's aunt Babe Smith (Annette Badland) and Queenie were baby farmers in Ramsgate years before.

== Tamwar Masood ==
Tamwar Masood, played by Himesh Patel is the son of Zainab Masood (Nina Wadia) and Masood Ahmed (Nitin Ganatra), and the brother of Shabnam (Zahra Ahmadi; Rakhee Thakrar) and Syed Masood (Marc Elliott). Tamwar works hard on his studies to please his parents, but he fails to achieve the grades he needs for his place at university. At his brother Syed's wedding to Amira Shah (Preeya Kalidas), Tamwar meets Afia Khan (Meryl Fernandes) and they kiss. Later in 2010, Tamwar meets Afia again and they begin dating, leading to a marriage. This is despite Afia's father, Yusef Khan (Ace Bhatti), being Zainab's ex-husband. However, the various dramas between the two families, including Yusef physically abusing Zainab, ultimately lead to Afia divorcing Tamwar.

== Brendan Hughes ==
Brendan Hughes
- EastEnders character
- Portrayed by: Tim Hudson
- First appearance: Episode 3444; 1 October 2007
- Last appearance: Episode 3449; 9 October 2007
In-universe information
- Occupation: Solicitor

Brendan Hughes, played by Tim Hudson, is the solicitor of Chelsea Fox (Tiana Benjamin) and Deano Wicks (Matt Di Angelo). He represents them in court after they are charged with falsifying evidence in a police enquiry. Despite Mr Hughes' plea for lenience, Deano and Chelsea are sentenced to 6 months in prison.

== Vinnie Monks ==
Vinnie Monks, played by Bobby Davro, meets Shirley Carter (Linda Henry) after he hits her with his car. Vinnie and Shirley soon enter a relationship, but Shirley finds herself more in love with Phil Mitchell (Steve McFadden) and less in love with Vinnie. After she forgets his birthday, Vinnie finally confronts her, resulting in Shirley revealing her true feelings for Phil. They split, but Vinnie is soon joined by his son, Callum (Elliott Jordan). When an old friend offers him the chance to travel across the world in a vintage car, Vinnie accepts the offer, but is unsure whether he should take his ex-girlfriend, Shirley.

== Masood Ahmed ==
Masood Ahmed, played by Nitin Ganatra, is the husband of Zainab Masood (Nina Wadia), and the father of Shabnam (Zahra Ahmadi), Tamwar (Himesh Patel) and Syed Masood (Marc Elliott). Masood appears as the local postman, and moves to Albert Square with his family.

== Bird Meadows ==
Bird Meadows
- EastEnders character
- Portrayed by: Brett Fancy
- Duration: 2007, 2009
- First appearance: Episode 3456; 22 October 2007
- Last appearance: Episode 3797; 29 May 2009
In-universe information
- Occupation: Gangster

Liam "Bird" Meadows, played by Brett Fancy, is a member of Terry Bates's (Nicholas Ball) gang of football hooligans. He catches up with Jase Dyer (Stephen Lord), a former member of the gang, in Walford and attempts to recruit him back into the gang. When Jase refuses, Bird helps Terry and the gang to arrange a car crash for Dee (Steve Chaplin), the man who had sent Jase to prison. When this fails to win Jase back, the gang raid The Queen Victoria pub looking for him.

In May 2009 he returns during Terry's trial, though he is arrested for assaulting Billy Mitchell (Perry Fenwick) and holding Jay Brown (Jamie Borthwick) hostage.

== Terry Bates ==
Terry Bates
- EastEnders character
- Portrayed by: Nicholas Ball
- Duration: 2007–2009
- First appearance: Episode 3458; 25 October 2007
- Last appearance: Episode 6011; 29 May 2009
- Introduced by: Diederick Santer (2007)
In-universe information
- Occupation: Gangster recurring]]
- Wife: Viv Bates (until 2019)

Terry Bates, played by Nicholas Ball, is a notorious gang lord and the leader of a football firm; amongst his gang members include Terry's right-hand man Bird Meadows (Brett Fancy), their fellow accomplice Dee (Steve Chaplin), and formerly his protege Jase Dyer (Stephen Lord). At the age of 15, Jase had arrived in London from Manchester and Terry ended up taking him under his wing. After Dee told the police about Jase's unruly behaviour, Jase went to prison and came out a changed man - caring for his son Jay. In October 2007, Terry sends Bird to find Jase in Walford; Jase soon meets up the gang at a pub. The gang later turn on Dee when they find out he had told the police about Jase, and arrange for his car to crash - injuring him severely. Jase expresses his wish to have no part in the gang, so Terry visits Jay while Jase is out; he takes Jay to see a firework display. Jase later finds Terry in a snooker hall, and again says that he wants no further involvement with the gang. They play snooker afterwards, and Terry allows him to go home - but is left fuming as Jase leaves.

Later, Terry leads a gang of hitmen to storm The Queen Victoria public house - believing Jase is there on a date with his girlfriend Dawn Swann (Kara Tointon). Not finding him, Terry orders his gang to smash up the pub and they end up taking hostages; which consists of the pub's landlady Peggy Mitchell (Barbara Windsor), her nieces Roxy (Rita Simons) and Ronnie (Samantha Womack); her close friend Patrick Trueman (Rudolph Walker); and his wife Yolande (Angela Wynter), Garry Hobbs (Ricky Groves), Minty Peterson (Cliff Parisi), Gus Smith (Mohammed George) and Dawn's brother Mickey Miller (Joe Swash) and their common-law stepfather Keith (David Spinx). While his gang observes the hostages, Terry confronts Jase in the cellar and has him attacked - knocking down a pregnant Honey Mitchell (Emma Barton) onto some empty beer kegs. Jase rushes her to hospital after Terry leaves the area with his gang members. He later appears at the hospital, then later visits Jase's flat to turn Jay against his biological father. Though he achieves with his scheme, Terry - along with Bird - is eventually arrested after Jase teams up with Peggy's son Phil (Steve McFadden) to claim that Terry's actions had resulted in the death of Phil's relative, Will (Toby Warpole).

Terry soon returns to Walford on 25 July 2008, after Jase - desperate for money - agrees to work for him again. Terry reappears in August, where he makes plans for Jase to get some of his money back for him. It turns out that Jase has been stealing from him, and Terry, in retaliation, sets Jase up, then returns to his flat and holds Jay hostage. Jase seeks help from Phil's cousin Billy (Perry Fenwick), and together the pair rush to the rescue. A confrontation ensues where Billy managed to get Jay out of the flat to safety in Jase's van. Terry has his men beat Jase to the brink of death. Terry then viciously stabs Jase in an attempt to kill him. After Jay makes a frantic call to Honey, armed CO19 officers storm 89 George Street and arrest Terry, his men and Billy, who had been hiding in the bathroom after seeing the gang standing over Jase and was too frightened to try to save him. Jase later dies in hospital.

In May 2009, Terry reappears on trial; he has been arrested and charged with Jase's murder. Prior to the events of his trial starting, Terry gets his wife Viv (Dido Miles) to threaten Billy by saying she will hurt Jay if he does go to the trial to testify. When his name is still on the witness list, Viv sends Bird and two other hitmen to hold Jay hostage. However, Terry is found guilty of Jase's murder and is sentenced to life imprisonment. He later orders his wife to get Bird to call him, but she instead turns on Terry by standing up to him - telling her husband that she will no longer take orders from him. Terry accuses Viv of betraying and using him, before threatening her with revenge - stating that she'll "get what she deserves" just like Billy. Unfazed, Viv calls Terry weak and continues to taunt her husband until she throws her wedding ring at him. Viv then leaves the prison, telling her husband that he is on his own now, and Terry is left seething at having to spend the rest of his life in prison.

In October 2019, Terry dies and his body is brought to Coker and Mitchell Funeral Directors. This enrages Jay, who manages the funeral parlour. However, after realising Viv does not recognise him, Jay agrees to bury Terry.

== Dee ==
Dee
- EastEnders character
- Portrayed by: Steve Chaplin
- First appearance: Episode 3458; 25 October 2007
- Last appearance: Episode 3467; 8 November 2007
- Introduced by: Diederick Santer
In-universe information
- Wife: Vicky

Dee, played by Steve Chaplin, is a member of Terry Bates's (Nicholas Ball) hooligan firm alongside Terry, Bird Meadows (Brett Fancy) and Jase Dyer (Stephen Lord). It is revealed that Dee was the one who informed on Jase to the police, resulting in Jase being sent to prison. Terry and his firm arrange a car crash for Dee, which leaves him severely injured.

== Jack Branning ==
Jack Branning, played by Scott Maslen, is the son of Jim Branning (John Bardon) and brother of Carol Jackson (Lindsey Coulson) and Max Branning (Jake Wood). Soon after his arrival in Walford Jack begins an on-off relationship with Ronnie Mitchell (Samantha Womack), but he betrays her by having sex with her sister Roxy (Rita Simons), and getting her pregnant. Jack also has a brief fling with Sam Mitchell (Danniella Westbrook), resulting in another baby. He goes on to reunite with Ronnie, however their child, James dies of sudden infant death syndrome. Jack then has a relationship with Sharon Rickman (Letitia Dean), but he jilts her moments before they are due to marry. Maslen departed from the show on 15 October 2013 after six years on the show, but later returned full time at Christmas 2015. Jack has been regarded as one of the soap's "iconic" characters.

== Will Mitchell ==
Will Mitchell
- EastEnders character
- Portrayed by: Toby Walpole (2007–2014); Freddie Phillips (2015–present)
- Duration: 2007–2012, 2014–present
- First appearance: Episode 3470; 13 November 2007
- Created by: Diederick Santer
- Introduced by: Diederick Santer (2007); Bryan Kirkwood (2011); Dominic Treadwell-Collins (2014)
- Spin-off appearances: Billy's Olympic Nightmare (2012)
In-universe information
- Occupation: Student
- Family: Mitchell
- Father: Billy Mitchell
- Mother: Honey Mitchell
- Sisters: Janet Mitchell
- Half-brothers: Dan Pearce
- Grandfathers: Jack Edwards; Stevie Mitchell
- Uncles: Charlie Mitchell; Teddy Mitchell
- Nieces: Lola Pearce
- First cousins: Jamie Mitchell; Harry Mitchell; Barney Mitchell (adoptive)
- Other relatives: Phil Mitchell; Sam Mitchell; Ronnie Mitchell; Roxy Mitchell; Ben Mitchell; Louise Mitchell; Amy Mitchell; Caroline Bishop; Lexi Pearce

Will Mitchell, played by Toby Walpole until 2014, and Freddie Phillips from 2015, is the son of Billy (Perry Fenwick) and Honey Mitchell (Emma Barton).

In March 2007, Honey finds out she is pregnant again and tells Pat Evans (Pam St Clement), but asks her not to tell Billy. Pat persuades Honey to tell him, but he is distant initially. He soon comes round, following a heart to heart, and admits to being concerned, like Honey, that they would love the new baby more than their daughter Janet Mitchell (Grace) if it did not have Down syndrome, which Janet has. Honey reassures him it will not happen. After this, Billy and Honey agree they want the baby and gradually tell their families. On the due date in November 2007, Honey is knocked over during an incident at The Queen Victoria public house involving Jase Dyer (Stephen Lord), Terry Bates (Nicholas Ball) and Terry's gang of football hooligans, and she goes into labour. When William is born, it seems that he is stillborn because he is not breathing but he pulls through. Honey wants to name him after Billy and feels guilty about being happy that he does not have Down's syndrome.

William leaves Walford with Honey and Janet in September 2008 when Billy lies about giving Jase's money to charity, which had led to his death. It is revealed a few days later that they are living with Honey's father Jack Edwards (Nicky Henson). Janet and William return when Peggy Mitchell (Barbara Windsor) wants a family photo taken. On Christmas Day 2008, Janet and William return again for Christmas but are not seen on-screen. In April 2009, when it is revealed that William is ill, Billy goes to see him, leaving the Mitchell family, who are torn apart by the true identity of Danielle Jones (Lauren Crace) and her subsequent death, to see William. William reappears in May 2009, along with Janet, for Billy's birthday party. In December 2009, Peggy's ex-husband Archie Mitchell (Larry Lamb) and his girlfriend, Janine Butcher (Charlie Brooks), convince Honey to allow Billy to have Janet and William for Christmas in return for him keeping quiet about their plotting against the Mitchells. In May 2010, Billy has trouble telling Janet and William that Honey has been involved in a car crash and that Jack has died. William appears again in May 2011 when he meets Billy's girlfriend Julie Perkins (Cathy Murphy) for the first time as they play in the local park. In June 2011, he visits Billy on Father's Day and in July 2011, Janet and William meet their niece Lola Pearce (Danielle Harold) off-screen for the first time.

In July 2012, Janet and William make an appearance in the spin-off episode Billy's Olympic Nightmare. During the live segment at the end of the second episode, William returns to the Square to watch Billy take part in the Olympic Torch relay.

William returned in February 2014 with Janet to stay with Billy. Lola's boyfriend Peter Beale (Ben Hardy), feels squeezed out by this as the flat is overcrowded. Peter also asks his father Ian Beale (Adam Woodyatt) to give Billy a job in his fish and chip shop, so Billy can provide for Janet and William.

In May 2014, William returns again along with Honey and Janet. Billy and Honey take Janet and William out for the day and Billy believes Honey wants to reconcile with him, but she reveals that William has been offered a modelling job in Canada and she plans to move there with Janet and William. She explains that she wanted Billy to be able to spend as much time with Janet and William as he could before they left. Billy is outraged by this, even more so when he discovers that William's contract lasts for a year. Billy burns Janet's passport and pleads with Honey not to take Janet and William but Honey is adamant and refuses to change her mind. She allows Janet and William to stay with Billy until their departure. Billy decides to flee with Janet and William and stays the night at a hotel, with the intention of going to stay with Garry Hobbs (Ricky Groves). Billy's cousin Phil Mitchell (Steve McFadden) and Jay Brown (Jamie Borthwick), track Billy down and convince him to return to Walford with Janet and William. Honey finds out what Billy had been planning to do and she decides to let Janet stay with him whilst she is in Canada with William. Billy is satisfied with this solution, and after bidding farewell to Billy, William leaves for Canada with Honey.

In November 2015, William, now called Will, (now Freddie Phillips) returns with Honey to visit Billy and Janet. He is left devastated when Honey tells him his modelling contract has not been renewed. He and Janet are delighted when Honey decides to move near to Billy and they then move in with Billy's cousin, Ronnie Mitchell (Samantha Womack). In 2016, Billy, Honey, Janet and Will move into the flat above the funeral parlour, where Billy is made a partner in the business, but Will struggles to sleep. In July 2017, Will and Dennis Rickman Jnr (Bleu Landau) plan to throw eggs at Keegan Baker (Zack Morris), but accidentally hit his half-sister, Bernadette Taylor (Clair Norris). Keegan gets into Dennis's house and tells them Bernadette is pregnant. Dennis and Will apologise and Keegan attempts to force Dennis to smoke, but is caught and thrown out by Michelle Fowler (Jenna Russell). In 2024, Will is caught vaping by his mother after he was given a vape by Avani Nandra-Hart (Aaliyah James). In June 2024, Will confides in his grandfather Stevie Mitchell (Alan Ford) that he is being blackmailed. He tells Stevie that he has been catfished and needs £300 to stop the blackmailer from uploading nude images he has sent to the catfish. After Stevie's plan backfires, at the charity night that is held for Lola some money is stolen. Everyone believes it to be Stevie. After working out that it was really Will that stole it, Stevie confronts him and Will knocks him over resulting in Stevie being hospitalised. Phil discovers about the blackmailing and confronts the catfish. He gets the money back and makes out Stevie stole it. He tells Will to go along with the story. After Stevie's secret family turn up and there's arguments, Will finally admits what's been going on and he was to blame for the money and hurting his grandad.

=== Reception ===
The scenes in which Honey was attacked were subject to heavy criticism, with Ofcom receiving 78 complaints from viewers about the level of violence displayed, and concerns for the safety of her baby. The media regulatory body stated that: "In Ofcom's view the violence was not appropriately limited for this time of the evening when many children are available to view television." EastEnders was found to have breached the broadcasting code on this occasion, though the BBC defended itself by stating that there had been a gradual buildup to the event over several episodes, and that a content warning was aired prior to the episode's broadcast.

== Jamie Stewart ==
Jamie Stewart
- EastEnders character
- Portrayed by: Edward MacLiam
- Duration: 2007–2009
- First appearance: Episode 3478; 29 November 2007
- Last appearance: Episode 3827; 21 July 2009
In-universe information
- Occupation: Doctor
- Wife: Laura Stewart (divorced)
- Sons: Felix Stewart

Doctor Jamie Stewart, played by Edward MacLiam, is an Irish doctor at Walford General Hospital who helps Ronnie Mitchell (Samantha Womack) when she sprains her wrist. He flirts with Ronnie's sister, Roxy (Rita Simons), who invites him to attend the opening of their new nightclub, R&R, which he attends on 30 November.

He reappears in May 2008 when Roxy has to go to hospital after fainting. Jamie gives Roxy his number. He later meets up with her at The Queen Victoria pub, though he is interrupted when his former wife Laura Stewart (Jessica Regan) arrives and asks him to look after their son, Felix Stewart (Oaklee Pendergast). Roxy gets on well with Felix, but when she faints again and finds out that she is pregnant, Jamie tells her that he cannot commit to a relationship with her, as he is already preoccupied with Felix.

In 2009, he treats Stacey Slater (Lacey Turner) after she falls and cuts her head.

== Bernadette Logan ==
Bernadette Logan
- EastEnders character
- Portrayed by: Olivia Grant
- Duration: 2007–2008
- First appearance: Episode 3484; 10 December 2007
- Last appearance: Episode 3601; 24 June 2008

Bernadette Logan, played by Olivia Grant, is a pupil in Abi Branning (Lorna Fitzgerald) and Ben Mitchell's (Charlie Jones) school year. She is first seen when she takes part in Dot Branning (June Brown) and Yolande Trueman's (Angela Wynter) 2007 nativity play. Abi is jealous of her as Bernadette is playing Mary. After Abi tries to sabotage Bernadette to gain the role of Mary, she is demoted from narrator to the role of the donkey.

Bernadette later appears at Abi's twelfth birthday party in June 2008, when she teases Abi about having a childish party, but they later become friends. In September 2008, Abi tells her father Max (Jake Wood) that she'd confided in Bernadette about her mother Tanya's (Jo Joyner) relationship with Max's brother Jack (Scott Maslen), and Bernadette had been calling Tanya a "scrubber". Max tells Abi to stand up to Bernadette, and it is revealed that Abi had assaulted Bernadette (off-screen) and been suspended from school for four days.

== Oscar Branning ==
Oscar Branning, played by Gabriel Miller-Williams until 2008, then Neo Hall in 2008 to February 2015, Charlee Hall in 2017, and Pierre Counihan-Moullier from 2025, is the son of Tanya Branning (Jo Joyner) and Max Branning (Jake Wood) and is born onscreen on 14 December 2007. Oscar initially appears on a recurring basis with minor storylines as a child until 2017. In 2025, it was announced that Oscar would be returning to EastEnders after an eight-year break. Counihan-Moullier was recast in the role. Executive producer Ben Wadey, who reintroduced the character, said that upon his return, he is "very much a Branning". Counihan-Moullier stated that viewers should "be prepared for the unexpected" as the character had become complex. Digital Spy described Oscar as a "chaotic teenager who feels like both of his parents have abandoned him".

Upon the role being recast to Counihan-Moullier, it saw Oscar receive more mature storylines. This began with him feeling abandoned by his parents as a result of his involvement with gangs, which saw him serve a sentence in a youth offender institution. After his release, he is taken in by his elder sister, Lauren Branning (Jacqueline Jossa). Other focuses have been his friendship and eventual attack on Patrick Trueman (Rudolph Walker), his rocky relationship with Jasmine Fisher (Indeyarna Donaldson-Holness), reconciling with Max and unknowingly becoming romantically involved with Jasmine's twin brother, Josh Goodwin (Joshua Vaughan). For his portrayal of Oscar, Counihan-Moullier was nominated for Best Soap Newcomer at the TV Choice Awards.

=== Casting ===
Oscar was originally played by Gabriel Miller-Williams. In 2008, Miller-Williams was fired, as the BBC were cutting costs, and it cost £300 a day to transport him to the set from his home in Leigh-on-Sea. His mother, Claire, said she was going to sue the BBC as she only found out he was sacked after a taxi failed to pick him up. She said, "It's a disgusting way to treat people. We still haven't had a call explaining why he was sacked. I've sent his contract to solicitors to investigate legal action." A BBC spokesperson said, "We're looking to hire local babies as we watch costs." They also said Miller-Williams' agent had been informed.

In June 2025, it was confirmed that the character would return, with the role recast to Pierre Counihan-Moullier. His return aired on 14 July.

== Gaynor Lucas ==
Gaynor Lucas
- EastEnders character
- Portrayed by: Kathleen Frazer
- Duration: 2007–2014
- First appearance: April 2007
- Last appearance: January 2014
- Created by: Diederick Santer
In-universe information
- Occupation: Beautician

Gaynor Lucas played by Kathleen Frazer, is an old friend of Tanya Branning (Jo Joyner), who works in Tanya's beauty salon Booty. On 24 February 2009, Gaynor appears as part of an iconic episode of EastEnders featuring only black members of the cast. Gaynor arranges with Chelsea Fox (Tiana Benjamin) to meet in The Queen Victoria public house for a drink. Theo Kelly (Rolan Bell) uses her to get Chelsea to come to the pub so he can speak to her. This episode marks her first credited appearance and first main speaking part.

Booty closes down in late 2009, so Gaynor loses her job. Gaynor works as a makeup artist for Denise Fox's (Diane Parish) wedding, to Lucas Johnson (Don Gilet). In February 2010, Gaynor gives out beauty treatments at Bianca Jackson's (Patsy Palmer) hen party. Gaynor resumes her old job when Roxy Mitchell (Rita Simons) reopens the beauty salon as Roxy's. When Roxy faces financial difficulties, Roxy sells the salon back to Tanya, and Gaynor continues working there. Tanya sells the salon to Sadie Young (Kate Magowan) in 2013, and Gaynor continues as an employee. Sadie leaves and sells the salon; Gaynor stops appearing during this period, as she does not have a job any more.

== Others ==
Character	Date(s)	Actor	Circumstances
DS Grimwood	1 January, 11 October 2008, 11 September 2009 (18 episodes)	Steve Hansell	A police officer investigating Pauline Fowler's (Wendy Richard) murder. In October 2008 he investigates Max Branning's (Jake Wood) attempted murder case. In September 2009, he searches for Sam Mitchell (Danniella Westbrook), who becomes a fugitive for the murder of Den Watts (Leslie Grantham).
Adam Childe	8 January	Matthew Ashforde	A duty solicitor who is assigned to represent Sonia Fowler (Natalie Cassidy) when she is arrested on suspicion of the murder of her former mother-in-law, Pauline (Wendy Richard). He is nervous, and Sonia is relieved when Phil Mitchell (Steve McFadden) pays for Ritchie Scott (Sian Webber) to represent her instead of Adam.
Dermot	11 January, 12–15 May 2009 (4 episodes)	Scott Mean	A man who comes onto Stacey Branning (Lacey Turner), but is beaten up by her brother Sean (Robert Kazinsky). In 2009, he and Stacey meet up again and have sex.
Ellie	11 January–8 May (2 episodes)	Hazel Holder	A nurse at Walford General Hospital. She appears when May Wright (Amanda Drew) pushes Dawn Swann (Kara Tointon) down the steps.
Jonathan	15 January	Iain Stirland	
Jenny	15 January	Hattie Ladbury	
Dr Newton	16–18 January (2 episodes)	Rebecca Sarker	
Maddy	16–18 January (2 episodes)	Annabel Scholey	Naomi Julien's (Petra Letang) mortgage adviser.
Mr Rogers	29–30 January (2 episodes)	Alan Perrin	
Andy Henderson	5–15 February, 4–17 December 2009, 9 April 2010 (7 episodes)	Jem Wall	A police officer involved in the search for missing Kevin Wicks (Phil Daniels). In 2009, PC Henderson questions Masood Ahmed (Nitin Ganatra) about a car crash, and appears again when Roxy (Rita Simons) and Ronnie Mitchell (Samantha Womack) hold an event at the community centre, to tell them that they do not have a licence. In 2010, he questions Billie Jackson (Devon Anderson) about a witness statement he gave regarding Jack Branning's (Scott Maslen) shooting.
Guy	13 February	Andrew French	
Anna Price	15–16 February (2 episodes)	Mandana Jones	A marriage counsellor who sees Max Branning (Jake Wood) and Tanya Branning (Jo Joyner).
Jed	9 March	Burn Gorman	A man who had been left on Dungeness beach whilst on his stag party. Kevin Wicks (Phil Daniels) meets him and Jed tells him that he is getting married next week and has a daughter, but that he is a bad father. Kevin tells him to sort out his life, but Jed steals Kevin's bag and ferry ticket to France, and gets on a bus. Kevin follows the bus, but when he catches up with it he discovers it has been involved in an accident. Jed appears with blood pouring down his face and falls to the floor. Kevin then holds him as he dies.
Carl Talbot	20 March	David Fox	A bailiff who is sent to claim money from Billy Mitchell (Perry Fenwick). After a confrontation with Billy's relative Phil (Steve McFadden), Billy is forced to give Talbot money from the Video shop he is working in.
Nadezhda	27–29 March (2 episodes)	Irina Diva	A Bulgarian woman brought in to work at the Launderette. Dot Branning (June Brown) berates her for booking too many service washes, so she throws a tantrum, jumping on the laundry.
Danny Fuller	5 April – 30 August (2 episodes)	Gyuri Sarossy	A man who rents 55 Victoria Road from Ian Beale (Adam Woodyatt) for himself, his wife Jess and their family. When Phil Mitchell (Steve McFadden) tells them of the crime around Walford, Danny barters with Ian, demanding that he reduce the rent price by 30%. Ian later accepts this. Danny later informs The Beales that his family are leaving Walford as his daughter secured a place at a private school.
Jess Fuller	5 April		The wife of Danny (Gyuri Sarossy). They rent 55 Victoria Road from Ian Beale (Adam Woodyatt).
Vince Franks	6 April	Jamie Kenna	The father of school bully Jez Franks (Tex Jacks). Phil Mitchell (Steve McFadden) approaches Vince about Jez bullying his son, Ben (Charlie Jones). Vince seems sceptical about his son's bullying, so Phil punches him, threatening to attack him again if Jez does not leave Ben alone.
Mary Lavender	9 April	Regina Freedman	A vicar for the church that Dot Branning (June Brown) used to attend with her friend, Margot Baker. When Dot and her husband Jim (John Bardon) visit Kent, Dot visits the church and Reverend Lavender informs her that Margot had died two weeks previously. Later, A young refugee named Anya Covalenco (Olga Fedori) leaves her son Tomas (Dylan and Tyler Woolf) in the church for Reverend Lavender to take in, but Dot takes him back to Walford because Mary is on holiday.
Douglas Baker	9 April	Paul Kaye	A former vicar who has lost his faith in God. His mother, Margot, was friends with Dot Branning (June Brown), and he was also a former playmate of Dot's son Nick Cotton (John Altman), until Nick put a frog down his trousers. Margot died in March 2007, and Douglas is clearing out her house when Dot visits him. They argue about religion, and Dot reminds Douglas of his mother. He tells Dot he is glad his mother is dead, and says that Nick will feel the same when she dies.
Paul Jenkins	13 April	Simon Quarterman	An immigration official, acting on a tip-off from Jim Branning (John Bardon), who searches 25 Albert Square for illegal immigrant Anya Covalenco (Olga Fedori). When Jim's wife Dot (June Brown) returns home, after hiding Anya, she asks him to leave. He later follows Jim, Dot and Anya to a church, where he brands Dot a "religious nut", and is told to back off by his superior, Warren Rice (Ewan Bailey). He later takes Anya away when she gives herself up, not knowing she has left her son Tomas (Dylan and Tyler Woolf) with Jim and Dot.
Gerald	12 April	Brian Cowan	A man who is Hazel Hobbs (Kika Mirylees) fiancé. Hazel then decides she does not want to marry him because he has too much nasal hair, describing it as "like tusks". She and Garry rush back to Gerald's house to collect her belongings, but he arrives at the house before they leave and hits Garry Hobbs (Ricky Groves), thinking he is Hazel's toyboy.
Warren Rice	13 April	Ewan Bailey	A senior immigration official, acting on a tip-off from Jim Branning (John Bardon), who follows Jim, his wife Dot (June Brown) and illegal immigrant Anya (Olga Fedori) to a church, where he berates his junior, Paul Jenkins (Simon Quarterman) when he brands Dot a "religious nut". He then explains to Dot that under British law, churches are not a sanctuary.
Jimbo Wicks	23 April	Lloyd Richards	The son of Kevin Wicks (Phil Daniels) and Shirley Carter (Linda Henry) who died several years earlier of cystic fibrosis. He is seen only in an old home movie along with his younger sister, Carly Wicks (Kellie Shirley), and brother Dean Wicks (Matt Di Angelo).
PC Shona Blake	24 April 2007– 28 May 2010 (8 episodes)	Catherine Bailey	A police officer who arrests Shirley Carter (Linda Henry) and Pat Evans (Pam St Clement) for fighting in the street. Two years later, she comes to The Queen Victoria public house to arrest Sam Mitchell (Danniella Westbrook) after she absconds. She then interviews Ben Mitchell (Charlie Jones) when he confesses to assaulting Jordan Johnson (Michael-Joel David Stuart).
Sergeant Lewis	26 April 2007– 31 May 2013 (8 episodes)	Andy Greenhalgh	A police desk sergeant. He first appears when Shirley Carter (Linda Henry) and Pat Evans (Pam St Clement) are arrested for fighting in the street, and then when Rob Minter (Stuart Laing) was arrested for assaulting May Wright (Amanda Drew). He is seen again when Lauren Branning (Madeline Duggan) confesses to her father Max's (Jake Wood) attempted murder, and appears later when Roxy (Rita Simons) and Ronnie Mitchell (Samantha Womack) are arrested. Sergeant Lewis is present when Peggy Mitchell (Barbara Windsor) visits Danny Mitchell (Liam Bergin) at the police station after he is arrested for fighting. He then appears when Ben Mitchell (Joshua Pascoe) confesses to Heather Trott's (Cheryl Fergison) murder, and later when Lauren (now Jacqueline Jossa) is arrested for assaulting Lucy Beale (Hetti Bywater).
Natasha Powell	7–8 June (2 episodes)	Natasha Gordon	A social worker who arrives to collect Tomas Covalenco (Dylan and Tyler Woolf) from Dot (June Brown) and Jim Branning's (John Bardon) house, after Dot phoned Social Services and told them that Tomas was the baby of an illegal immigrant, Anya (Olga Fedori).
Marion Crawford	29 June	Ann Firbank	The mother of Stella Crawford (Sophie Thompson) who appears when Stella and her fiancé Phil Mitchell (Steve McFadden) visit Marion and her husband Edward Crawford (David Quilter) to announce their engagement. While Phil is out of the room, Marion tells Stella that she should not be left alone with Phil's son Ben (Charlie Jones), and blames her for the death of her other daughter, Catherine. Later Marion and Edward reveal to Phil that Catherine had died in Stella's care.
Edward Crawford	29 June	David Quilter	The father of Stella Crawford (Sophie Thompson) and husband of Marion Crawford (Ann Firbank), who appears when Stella and her fiancé Phil Mitchell (Steve McFadden) visit to announce their engagement. Edward hides in a room away from Stella, and when confronted by Phil, he and Marion reveal that they blame Stella for the death of their other daughter, Catherine.
Cheryl Andrews	3 July	Charlotte Palmer	The wife of Bradley Branning's (Charlie Clements) boss, Tony (Alan McKenna), who attends a dinner party with Bradley and his girlfriend Stacey Slater (Lacey Turner). She gets on well with Stacey, and tells her of the merits of being married to a banker.
Sian	13 July	Claire Adams	A woman who Max Branning (Jake Wood) flirts with, but it is revealed she is a supplier for his wife, Tanya (Jo Joyner).
Fin	17 July	Danny Alder	A vet who tells Abi Branning (Lorna Fitzgerald) that her guinea pig, Marge is pregnant.
Jasmine Field	24 July 2007; 11–12 February 2010 (3 episodes)	Karen Ascoe	A police officer who, along with her partner PC Tony Webster, interviews Ben Mitchell (Charlie Jones) about the abuse he has received from Stella Crawford (Sophie Thompson). In February 2010, she arrests Dot Branning (June Brown) for assaulting her granddaughter Dotty Cotton (Molly Conlin), but releases her without charge as Dot is Dotty's primary carer.
Tony Webster	24 July	Uncredited	A police officer who, police officer who, along with his partner DC Jasmine Field (Karen Ascoe), interviews Ben Mitchell (Charlie Jones) about the abuse he has received from Stella Crawford (Sophie Thompson).
Alice Lord	2 August	Toni Palmer	A family friend and of Tanya Branning (Jo Joyner) and her sister Rainie Cross (Tanya Franks). She appears when Tanya tries to get in contact with Rainie, and tells Tanya that Rainie had many men visiting her flat.
Alan Simon	10–13 August (2 episodes)	Simon Meacock	Sean Slater's (Robert Kazinsky) duty solicitor when he is accused of attacking Patrick Trueman (Rudolph Walker). He constantly advises Sean that he is allowed to answer "no comment", as Sean is getting irate with police officers in the interview room. He later visits Sean's girlfriend Carly Wicks (Kellie Shirley).
Jo Davis	20 August	Jennifer Taylor	A receptionist who books Garry Hobbs (Ricky Groves) and Dawn Swann (Kara Tointon) a room in a hotel in Brighton. She is unable to book them a twin room, so books them a double room instead, and assists them in getting a cot for Dawn's baby Summer.
Ashok	20 August	Ash Varrez	A motorist that Pat Evans (Pam St Clement) has an argument about right of way, Pat agrees to give Shirley Carter (Linda Henry) and Heather Trott (Cheryl Fergison) a lift if they get rid Ashok. Shirley pretends she is the landlady of The Queen Victoria public house and tells he if he gives way she will reward him with a free drinks.
Will Passmore	24 August	Patrick Brennan	The manager of a care home called Springview, where Pat Evans's (Pam St Clement) sister, Joan, once lived. Pat and her companion Len Harker (Christopher Ellison) find the care home, and Will tells them that Joan had died three years ago, but that she had been happily married to a man named Michael and was well liked in the community.
Tamara	3–4 September (2 episodes)	Helen Coombe	Gus Smith's (Mohammed George) date, twin sister of Tonicha.
Tonicha	3–4 September (2 episodes)	Rachel Coombe	Mickey Miller's (Joe Swash) date, twin sister of Tamara.
Norman	24 September 2007– 12 March 2008	David Schaal	Shirley Carter's (Linda Henry) landlord whom she humiliates.
Pedro	5 October	Joseph Thompson	Manager of a gay bar which Carly Wicks (Kellie Shirley) worked at. Carly and her brother Deano Wicks (Matt Di Angelo) lodge at his flat.
Gwen	9 October	Rebecca Jo Hanbury	Chelsea Fox's (Tiana Benjamin) cellmate.
PC Annie Young	15 October; 10 March–11 September 2009 (6 episodes)	Lu Corfield	A police officer. In September, she investigates a break-in at the community centre.
Tony Evans	15 October	Uncredited	A psychiatrist friend of Ian Beale (Adam Woodyatt), who agrees to take Ian's stepson, Steven (Aaron Sidwell), into his mental hospital.
Felix Riley	22 October	John Webber	A loan shark who tries to loan money to Peggy Mitchell (Barbara Windsor). When he explains that he would effectively be buying The Queen Victoria public house from her and renting it back to her, Peggy throws him out.
Vicky	25 October – 8 November (3 episodes)	Louise Fullerton	Dee's (Steve Chaplin) wife. She blames Jase Dyer (Stephen Lord) for her husband's injuries.
Raymond Storry	8 November	Julien Ball	A psychiatrist who works at Tony Evans's mental hospital, who looks after Steven Beale (Aaron Sidwell). He tells Steven's grandmother Pat Evans (Pam St Clement) that Steven is ready to leave the hospital, and prescribes him some pills, which Steven later throws away.
Monique	20–23 November (3 episodes)	Heather Cave	Peter Beale's (Thomas Law) French exchange student who takes a liking to Steven Beale (Aaron Sidwell). She leaves Albert Square when the Beales forbid her from seeing Steven, setting up Peter with Lauren Branning (Madeline Duggan) in the process.
Dave Stewart	20 November	Vincent Carmichael	A colleague of Max Branning (Jake Wood) who interviews Max's son Bradley (Charlie Clements) for a job as an insurance salesman. Stewart is impressed by Bradley in the interview and offers him the job, but Bradley turns it down as he does not feel that it is the right career path for him.
