= Natasha Gordon =

British playwright of Jamaican heritage (born 1976)

Natasha Gordon MBE
- Born: Natasha Delia Letitia Gordon; 1976 (age 49–50); London, England
- Education: Holy Family Catholic School; Guildhall School of Music and Drama
- Occupations: Actor; playwright
- Writing career
- Notable work: Nine Night (2018)

Natasha Delia Letitia Gordon MBE (born 1976) is a British playwright of Jamaican heritage. In 2018, after a career as an actor, she made her debut as a playwright with the play Nine Night, becoming the first black British female playwright to have a play staged in the West End. Nine Night was also nominated for Best New Comedy at the 2019 Olivier Awards, making Gordon the first Black British Female Playwright to be nominated.

== Early life and education ==
Natasha Gordon was born in North London in 1976 to parents who were both migrants from Jamaica. Her grandparents had arrived in London from Jamaica by boat as part of the so-called Windrush generation in the late 1950s. Her mother joined them in 1963, where she found work, a Jamaican-born husband, and a comforting West Indian community.

Gordon grew up in the Leyton and Walthamstow areas and was a pupil at Holy Family Catholic School. She has credited her drama teacher at school for her love of acting and performing on stage. Gordon studied acting at the Guildhall School of Music and Drama, graduating with a Bachelor of Arts degree in 1999. She had auditioned three times before being accepted onto the course.

== Career ==
=== Acting ===
As an actor, Gordon's stage credits include Red Velvet (Tricycle Theatre), The Low Road and Clubland (Royal Court Theatre), Mules (Young Vic) and As You Like It (Royal Shakespeare Company). Her film and TV credits include Dough, Line of Duty, Class and Danny and the Human Zoo.

=== Writing ===
Initially trained as an actor, Gordon started writing later in her career in response to the lack of opportunity offered to actresses of colour, especially as they get older and especially in lead roles. She has spoken about feeling a sense of responsibility to "create work for Black actors and for female actors" as a playwright. Nine Night is Gordon's debut play, which premiered in 2018 at the National Theatre and won her several accolades.

Gordon was appointed to be an Associate of the National Theatre in 2023, where she is also under commission. In 2024, she was a finalist in the Hermitage Major Theater Award, earning her a residency and fellowship at Hermitage, as well as a cash prize of US$1,500. In 2025, she was announced as one of six writers in residence at the Royal Shakespeare Company, where she has been commissioned to write a new play.

==== Nine Night ====
Gordon's debut play, Nine Night, premiered at London's National Theatre in April 2018 and received critical acclaim. It later transferred to London's Trafalgar Studios on 1 December, marking a historic moment as Gordon became the first black British female playwright to have a play in the West End. In a profile by The Guardian newspaper, Gordon explained that the "nine night" ritual of gathering to eat, drink and share stories helped her connect with her family's past and served as inspiration for her first play. She also mentioned the deportation threats faced by many of the Windrush generation as a catalyst for her to delve deeper into her grandparents' challenges. The success of the play led to Gordon winning the London Evening Standard Theatre Awards Charles Wintour Award for Most Promising Playwright in 2018.

In 2019, The Guardian writers ranked Nine Night the 17th best theatre show since 2000.

== Recognitions ==
In 2019, Gordon was recognised in The Stage 100 list, which recognises 100 most influential people in the theatre and performing arts sector in the UK in a given year. She was appointed Member of the Order of the British Empire (MBE) in the 2020 New Year Honours for services to drama. In 2021, she was made a Fellow of the Guildhall School of Music and Drama, her alma mater.

== Personal life ==
Gordon's partner is Tom Anderson, who is also an actor. She has two children.

Gordon has spoken about the lack of racial diversity in the theatre industry in the UK. On becoming the first Black female playwright to have her work staged in the West End in 2018, Gordon said, "It didn't occur to me that it hadn't happened before; I felt sad and angry that that is the case". Gordon sees her achievement as a way to pave the way and "push the door open even wider" for other Black British theatre makers.

In 2018, Gordon was a contributor to the book Mother Country: Real Stories of the Windrush Children, edited by journalist Charlie Brinkhurst-Cuff.

== Acting credits ==
=== Theatre ===
Year	Title	Role	Venue/Production company	Refs
2001	Clubland (by Roy Williams)	Sandra	Royal Court Theatre	
2001-2002	Aladdin	Princess	Lyric Theatre, Hammersmith; Told by an Idiot production	
2002	Skin Deep (by Richard Vincent)	Dr Amanda Holland	Warehouse Theatre	
2002	Inside Out (by Tanika Gupta)	Diana	Arcola Theatre; Clean Break production	
2003	As You Like It	Phebe	Swan Theatre and Eisenhower Theater; Royal Shakespeare Company production	
2003	Cymbeline	Helen	Swan Theatre; Royal Shakespeare Company production	
2003-2004	The Tamer Tamed	Country Wife	Swan Theatre, Queen's Theatre, Eisenhower Theater; Royal Shakespeare Company production	
2010 - 2012	Speechless	Jennifer Gibbons	Sherman Cymru and Shared Experience production; Traverse Theatre, Bute Theatre (Royal Welsh College of Music & Drama), and UK tour	
2012-2014	Red Velvet	Connie	Tricycle Theatre, St. Ann's Warehouse	
2013	The Low Road	Old One-eyed Tizzy	Royal Court Theatre	
2016	LUCE	Harriet	Southwark Playhouse	
2018	Nine Night	Lorraine	Trafalgar Theatre	

=== Film and television ===
Title	Year	Role	Network/Channel	Note
The Bill	1994	Annie Sims	ITV	Series 10, Episode 41
The Bill	2000	Amy Okin	ITV	Series 16, Episode 35
Holby City	2004	Gayle Horton	BBC One	Series 6, Episode 34
Little Miss Jocelyn	2006		BBC	2 episodes
EastEnders	2007	Natasha Powell	BBC One	2 episodes
EastEnders	2016	Kay Breeze	BBC One	1 episode
Doctors	2006	Karen Dennis	BBC One	Series 7, Episode 166
Doctors	2007	Nimi Jones	BBC One	Series 9, Episode 131
Doctors	2016	Ella Ward	BBC One	Series 17, Episode 166
10 Days to War	2008	Receptionist	BBC Two	Episode 3
Law & Order UK	2010	Andrea Poole	ITV	Series 4, Episode 2
Danny and the Human Zoo	2015	Pearl	BBC One	Television film
Dough	2015	Safa Habimama	—N/a	Feature film
You, Me and the Apocalypse	2015	Higgs	Sky One	Series 1, Episode 1
Line of Duty	2016	PS Karen Marley	BBC Two	Series 3, Episode 1
Class	2016	Vivian Adeola	BBC Three	3 episodes

== Writing credits ==
- Nine Night (2018), writer, National Theatre
- Mr Loverman (2027), adaptation, National Theatre

== Awards and nominations ==
Year	Award	Category	Work	Result	Refs
2010	Stage Awards for Acting Excellence	Best Actress	Speechless	Nominated	
2018	The Stage Debut Awards	Best Writer	Nine Night	Nominated	
2018	Standard Theatre Awards	Most Promising Playwright	Nine Night	Won	
2018	Critics' Circle Theatre Award	Most Promising Playwright	Nine Night	Won	
2019	Olivier Award	Best New Comedy	Nine Night	Nominated	
2024	Hermitage Major Theater Award		—N/a	Finalist	
