= Nine Night =

2018 play by Natasha Gordon

- Original language: English
- Written by: Natasha Gordon

Premiere
- Date: 21 April 2018
- Place: Dorfman Theatre
- Directed by: Roy Alexander Weise - London (2019)
- Original run: 21 April - 26 May 2018

Nine Night is a 2018 play by Natasha Gordon. It focuses on the traditional Jamaican Nine nights, as a family struggles with their loss.

== Productions ==
=== National theatre and West End (2018) ===
Nine Night had its world premiere production at Dorfman Theatre beginning on 21 April 2018, playing a limited run to 26 May. The production was transferred to the West End, beginning previews at Trafalgar Studios on 1 December 2018 prior to opening night on 6 December. The production played a limited run to 23 February 2019. The transfer to Trafalgar Studios in 2018 made Natasha Gordon the first Black female playwright to have their work staged in the West End. The playwright herself also stepped into the role of Lorraine for this production. Both the original production and the West End transfer were directed by Roy Alexander Weise.

=== US (2022) ===
Nine Night was originally announced to be premiered in the US on 5 January 2022. However, the production was postponed due to cases of COVID-19 being detected in the company. The postponed production was premiered at the Round House Theatre (Bethesda, Maryland) on 14 September 2022, with the run finishing on 9 October. The US production was directed by Timothy Douglas.

=== Leeds and Nottingham Playhouses (2022) ===
In 2022, the play was scheduled for a revival at Leeds Playhouse from 24 September to 15 October, followed by a run at Nottingham Playhouse from 19 October to 5th November. This production was directed by Amanda Huxtable. Nine Night's run in Leeds was also part of the Out of Many Festival, which celebrated Jamaican culture in the city.

Actress Josephine Melville, who played the part of Aunt Maggie in this production, died backstage at Nottingham playhouse on 20 October 2022 after a performance. All subsequent performances of the Nottingham run were cancelled following Melville's death.

=== Kiln Theatre, London (2026) ===
In June 2026, Kiln Theatre announced a revival of Nine Night as part of its 2026/27 season. Directed by Amit Sharma, the production is set to run from 12 November to 19 December.

== Cast and characters ==
Character	Dorfman Theatre	West End	US	Leeds and Nottingham
Character	2018	2018-19	2022	2022
Lorraine	Franc Ashman	Natasha Gordon	Lilian Oben	Shereener Browne
Trudy	Michelle Greenidge	Michelle Greenidge	Joy DeMichelle	Andrea Davy
Anita	Rebekaha Murrell	Rebekaha Murrell	Kaitlyn Boyer	Jessica Whitehurst
Aunt Maggie	Cecilia Noble	Cecilia Noble	Kim James Bey	Josephine Melville ^{†}
Uncle Vince	Ricky Fearon	Karl Collins	Doug Brown	Wayne Rollins
Robert	Oliver Alvin-Wilson	Oliver Alvin-Wilson	Avery Glymph	Daniel Poyser
Sophie	Hattie Ladbury	Hattie Ladbury	Katie deBuys	Jo Mousley

^{†} Actor passed away during the production's run.

== Critical reception ==
The play received generally positive reviews. Paul Taylor for The Independent states "Natasha Gordon's debut play buzzes with comic energy...The piece generates a fantastic atmosphere of inclusion. Natasha Gordon is an actress, but I have no doubt that from now on, we will be hearing a lot more from her as a dramatist." In a five star review for the Evening Standard, Henry Hitchings states "Right now there’s probably no funnier performance in town than Cecilia Noble as Aunt Maggie, the clucking matriarch in Natasha Gordon’s richly enjoyable family drama."

== Awards and nominations ==
Year	Award	Category	Nominee	Result
2018	Evening Standard Theatre Award	Best Actress	Cecilia Noble	Nominated
2018	Evening Standard Theatre Award	Most Promising Playwright	Natasha Gordon	Won
2018	Evening Standard Theatre Award	Emerging Talent	Roy Alexander Weise	Won
2018	Critics’ Circle Theatre Award	Most Promising Playwright	Natasha Gordon	Won
2019	Laurence Olivier Award	Best New Comedy		Nominated
2019	Laurence Olivier Award	Best Actress in a Supporting Role	Cecilia Noble	Nominated
