= Ravinder Randhawa =

- Born: 1952 (age 73–74); India
- Citizenship: United Kingdom
- Occupation: Writer
- Writing career
- Language: English
- Website: ravinderrandhawa.com

Ravinder Randhawa (born 1952) is a British Asian novelist and short story writer. She founded the Asian Women Writers' Collective, an organisation for British Asian women writers.

== Life ==
Randhawa was born in India in 1952, but moved to England with her parents when she was seven years old, and grew up in Warwickshire. She has worked with an organisation setting up refuges and resource centres for Asian women, and participated in antiracism campaigns. As of 2014, she was living in London.

Randhawa is the subject of a chapter in British Asian Fiction: Twenty-first Century Voices by Sarah Upstone. Upstone writes that Randhawa "was essential to the burgeoning British Asian literature" and "not only wrote prolifically about the lives of British Asian women, but also fostered the careers of others, including Meera Syal."

== Work ==
In 1984, she founded the Asian Women Writers' Collective, which has published multiple collections of Asian women writers works. Her first novel A Wicked Old Woman is described as "a pioneering work of fiction", "one of the first [novels] to be published by a British Asian writer in the postwar period", and "a linguistically and structurally playful text that seems to foreground itself as artwork." The Coral Strand, published in 2001, was reissued as A Tiger's Smile. It "moves between pre-Independence Bombay and contemporary London" and "shifts seamlessly between places and states of mind, physical settings and stream of consciousness, between poetic prose and documentary realism".

== Selected publications ==
- A Wicked Old Woman. St. Paul: Women's Press (1987). ISBN 9780704350328
- Hari-Jan. London: Mantra Lingua (1992). ISBN 9781852691189
- The Coral Strand. Looe: House of Stratus (2001). ISBN 9780755103447

=== Contributed works ===
- A Girl's Best Friend. St. Paul: Women's Press (1987) ISBN 0704349078
- Right of Way. St. Paul: Women's Press (1989). ISBN 978-0704340916
- Flaming Spirit. London: Virago Press (1994). ISBN 9781853817496
- How Maxine Learned to Love her Legs: And Other Short Stories. London: Aurora Metro Books (1995) ISBN 9780951587744
- The New Anthem. Delhi: Tranquebar Press (2009). ISBN 9380032455
