= Leena Dhingra =

British Asian actress

- Born: India
- Education: University of East Anglia
- Occupations: Writer, actress and teacher
- Website: www.leenadhingra.com

Leena Dhingra is a British writer, actress and teacher.

== Life ==
Born in India, Dhingra came to Europe after the 1947 Partition of India. She was educated in India, England, France and Switzerland.

She was a key member of the Asian Women Writers' Collective in the 1980s.

Dhingra's 1988 novel Amritvela tells the story of Meera, a woman taken to England as a child, who is forced to confront her diasporic identity when returning to visit India after having married an Englishman. Dhingra graduated from the University of East Anglia with an MA in creative writing in 1991 and a PhD in 2001.

She has appeared in television soap operas Doctors as Nina Parmar, Coronation Street as Mina Parekh and EastEnders as Manju Patel. Her role as Manju was only supposed to be for two episodes but after an internet campaign, EastEnders made her a recurring character in the soap from Autumn 2007.

Furthermore, Dhingra has done the rounds of popular British TV by making appearances in The Bill, Casualty, Peak Practice, Cutting It, Silent Witness, Prime Suspect and Doctor Who.

She has also appeared in comedy shows Life Isn't All Ha Ha Hee Hee as Auntie Bindu and Grease Monkeys as Pinky Alluwahlia, and the film East is East (1999) as Mrs. Shah.

In 2021 Dhingra had a main role in the fourth series of Channel 4 school drama Ackley Bridge as Zainab Hyatt.

== Works ==
- Amritvela. London: Women's Press, 1988.
- First Light. Calcutta: Rupa & Co., 1991.
