= Rukhsana Ahmad =

British-Pakistani writer of novels, short stories, poetry and plays

- Born: Rukhsana Ahmad; December 1948 (age 77); Karachi, Pakistan
- Citizenship: Pakistan; United Kingdom
- Education: University of Karachi; Reading University; University of the Arts London
- Occupation: Writer
- Known for: Novels, plays and poetry
- Website: rukhsanaahmad.com

Rukhsana Ahmad (born December 1948) is a British Pakistani writer of novels, short stories, poetry, plays, and a translator, who after marriage migrated to England for further studies and pursue a career in writing. She has campaigned for Asian writers, particularly women.

== Biography ==
Rukhsana Ahmad was born in Karachi, Pakistan, in 1948. She did her schooling in many schools in different cities in Pakistan. She did her college education in Punjab University and in Karachi obtained Master of Arts degree from the Karachi University in English Literature and Linguistics. She then joined the University of Karachi and taught English Literature, until she married. Subsequent to her marriage she migrated to England, where she obtained degrees from the Reading University and the University of the Arts.

Stationed in London with her family, Ahmad began a freelance career as a playwright and journalist. She began translating works from Urdu into English, such as a volume of women's protest poetry under the title We Sinful Women (1991), which included the work of Kishwar Naheed, Fahmida Riaz, and Sara Shagufta among others; and Altaf Fatima's novel The One Who Did Not Ask (1993). Ahmad's first novel was The Hope Chest (1996), which highlights the life of a young woman brought up in two "different worlds". During 1991, as resident writer in Cleveland, Ahmad was editor of Dreams into Words and Daughters of the East. She was also a contributing writer to 2024's Feminist Theatre Then & Now: Celebrating 50 years.

As a popular playwright she has written numerous plays, such as Homing Birds and Song for a Sanctuary, which launched her career in radio and stage shows and Mistaken...Annie Besant in India (2007). She has also adapted plays for BBC Radio, including Wide Sargasso Sea by Jean Rhys, Woman at Point Zero by Nawal El Saadawi, Midnight's Children by Salman Rushdie and Maps for Lost Lovers by Nadeem Aslam. In June and October 1991, Ahmad's play Song for a Sanctuary' was played in many theaters in Britain. It was also published in an anthology of plays; Six Plays by Black and Asian Women Writers.

Ahmad became a member of the Asian Women Writers Collective in London in 1984. Along with Rita Wolf, in 1990 she co-established the Kali Theatre Company in London, which she headed for eight years. She has founded the South Asian Arts and Literature in the Diaspora Archive in the United Kingdom known as Salidaa (now Sadaa). She is also an advisory fellow of the Royal Literary Fund at Queen Mary's College, University of London.

== Awards ==
Ahmad has won many accolades in the form of nominations for well-known awards such as the Commission for Racial Equality Award, the Writers' Guild of Great Britain Award, the Sony Award, and the 2002 Susan Smith Blackburn Prize. Her play River on Fire (2001) won her the second place for the Susan Smith Blackburn theatre award. For her play Wide Sargasso Sea she received the Writers' Guild of Great Britain radio adaptation award.
