= Sara Shagufta =

Pakistani poet

- Born: 31 October 1954; Gujranwala, Pakistan
- Died: 4 June 1984 (aged 29); Drigh Colony, Karachi, Pakistan
- Occupation: Poet
- Partner: Ahmad Javed Qaiser Munawar Afzal Ahmad Syed
- Writing career
- Language: Urdu, Punjabi
- Notable works: Aankhein; Neend Ka Rang

Sara Shagufta (31 October 1954 – 4 June 1984) was an in Urdu and Punjabi language poet from Pakistan.

== Life ==
Sara was born on 31 October 1954 in Gujranwala, Pakistan in a lower-class family. Her family had migrated to Karachi from Punjab during the partition of India. Her father had remarried, and her mother supported her family through home-based work such as making flower garlands. Sara's letters offer insight into the difficulties she and her family faced growing up in a household with an absent father. They faced economic hardship, which escalated to the extent that the family had to go hungry. Belonging to a poor and uneducated family, she wanted to rise socially but could not pass her matriculation.

She was forcibly married at the age of 17 and the couple had a child that died as a newborn. The blame for the baby's death was directed towards Sara, which led to her divorce from her husband. This was followed by three other unsuccessful marriages.

An abusive relationship with her father, emotionally and sexually abused in her childhood, divorced by four men, shunned by her children and outcast by society, Sara Shagufta led a life filled with suffering. She developed mental illnesses as a result of the challenges she faced. She was admitted to a mental hospital due to her illness. After a non-fatal suicide attempt, she died by suicide at an early age of 29 on 4 June 1984, around 11 PM.

== Works ==
Her collections of poetry was published posthumously as Aankhein and Neend Ka Rang by Saeed Ahmed, a person she was in love with. Asad Alvi translated her poetry into English and published as The Colour of Sleep and Other Poems (2016). English translations of her poems 'Woman and Salt', 'To Daughter, Sheely' and 'The Moon is Quite Alone' appear in We Sinful Women by Rukhsana Ahmad.

== Legacy ==
Indian author Amrita Pritam, also a close friend of Sara, wrote two books based on the life and works of Sara; Ek Thi Sara (There was a Sara) (1990) and Life and Poetry of Sara Shagufta (1994). Main Sara (Me, Sara), a play written by Shahid Anwar, is based on the life of Sara. Sara Ka Sara Aasman, another play written by Danish Iqbal and directed by Tarique Hameed, is also based on the life of Sara. Based on Amrita Pritam's books on Sara, the play was presented by Wings Cultural Society at All India Radio's Urdu Theatre Festival in 2015.

== See also ==
- List of Urdu Poets
