= Asian Women Writers' Collective =

Organization of British Asian women writers

The Asian Women Writers' Collective (AWWC), formerly known as the Asian Women Writers Workshop, was an organization of British Asian women writers. Founded by the writer and activist Ravinder Randhawa in 1984, the AAWC provided a platform for several British Asian women to enter writing, including Ravinder Randhawa, Meera Syal, Leena Dhingra, Tanika Gupta and Rukhsana Ahmad.

== History ==
The Asian Women Writers' Workshop was founded in London in 1984. Its aim was to support creative writing by Asian women and increase access to publishers. It was initially supported by the Black Ink Collective, and funded by the Greater London Council (GLC). After the GLC's 1986 abolition, it received funding from Greater London Arts Association and Lambeth Council.

The group grew from a core group of eight South Asian members to a national membership of over a hundred, participating together in creative writing exercises and sharing work with each other. In 1987 they changed their name to the Asian Women Writers' Collective (AAWC), with some political debate over whether to include the term "Black" in their name in recognition of political blackness. As Asha Sen recounts:

Some members were in favour of calling themselves 'black' to show their solidarity with Afro-Caribbean women, while others felt discriminated against by certain dominant Afro-Caribbean women's groups. Another set felt that there were too many cultural differences between Asian and Afro-Caribbean writing to make it possible for the groups to respond critically to each other. The title 'Asian Women Writers' Collective' was finally agreed upon on the grounds that there had hitherto been no forum for Asian women to express themselves. It was decided that the collective would work closely with black women's groups and participate in events for black women writers.

In 1991, the AAWC lost its Arts Association funding. In 1992, moving beyond its original South Asian membership, the collective explicitly adopted a wider definition of the term "Asian", to include those from China, Japan, Korea and Turkey.

Two AAWC anthologies – Right of Way (1988) and Flaming Spirit (1994) – opened up opportunities for previously unpublished AAWC members. Though the AAWC was based in London, its postal membership scheme enabled writers outside London to receive feedback on their writing, so that Flaming Spirit also included writers based in Sheffield, Birmingham, Manchester and Cardiff.

From 1996, Lambeth Council started cutting funding and the organization ceased activity around early 1997. Its papers are held at the Birmingham Museum and Art Gallery.

== Anthologies ==
- Right of Way: Prose and Poetry from the Asian Women Writers' Collective. Women's Press. 1988. ISBN 9780704340916.
- Rukhsana Ahmad; Rahila Gupta, eds. (1994). Flaming Spirit: Stories from the Asian Women Writers' Collective. Virago. ISBN 9781853817496.
