= Wing and a Prayer (TV series) =

1997 British television series

- Genre: Legal drama
- Created by: Matthew Hall
- Starring: Sean Arnold; Rita Wolf; David Bark-Jones; Philip Martin Brown; George Irving; Connie Hyde; Kate Buffery
- Composer: Rob Lane
- Country of origin: United Kingdom
- Original language: English
- No. of series: 2
- No. of episodes: 14

Production
- Executive producers: Antony Root; Chris Parr; Mal Young
- Producers: Matthew Kuipers; Jacinta Peel
- Cinematography: Roger Bonnici
- Running time: 50 minutes
- Production company: Thames Television

Original release
- Network: Channel 5
- Release: 22 September 1997 – 7 March 1999

Wing and a Prayer is a BAFTA-nominated British television legal drama series, written and created by Matthew Hall, first broadcast on Channel 5 on 22 September 1997. The series, produced by Thames Television, was described as "an inside, behind-the-scenes look at the practice of law, and the lawyers whose lives are caught up in their work with each other". Sean Arnold starred as primary character Stephen Arlington, while Rita Wolf, David Bark-Jones, Philip Martin Brown and George Irving are also credited amongst the principal cast members.

A review of the series on AllMovie stated; "in the fine tradition of such American weeklies as L.A. Law and The Practice, the attorneys herein played as hard as they worked, with sexual intrigues and one-upsmanship abounding." The first series was released on DVD in Australia on 5 June 2013.

== Cast ==
- Sean Arnold as Stephen Arlington
- Rita Wolf as Jasmin Jamal
- David Bark-Jones as Simon Hudson
- Philip Martin Brown as John Daley
- George Irving as Judge Michael Freeman
- Connie Hyde as Catherine Heywood
- Kate Buffery as Amanda Dankwith
- Mark Womack as Chris Merchant
- William Ilkley as Kevin Granger
- Dominic Mafham as Carl Hallam
- Maureen Beattie as Anna Crozier
- Geoffrey McGivern as Don Gittings

== Episodes ==
=== Series 1 (1997) ===
No. overall	No. in series	Title	Directed by	Written by	Original release date	Viewers (millions)
1	1	"Hello, Goodbye"	Robin Sheppard	Matthew Hall	22 September 1997	N/A
2	2	"A Sense of Belonging"	Richard Laxton	Matthew Hall	29 September 1997	N/A
3	3	"Looking After Number One"	Richard Laxton	Matthew Hall	6 October 1997	N/A
4	4	"The Ties That Bind"	Robin Sheppard	Matthew Hall	13 October 1997	N/A
5	5	"A Fair Exchange"	Richard Laxton	Matthew Hall	20 October 1997	N/A
6	6	"The Greater Good"	Richard Laxton	Matthew Hall	27 October 1997	N/A

=== Series 2 (1999) ===
- Broadcast of Series 2 was switched from 8pm on Wednesdays to Sundays mid-way through the series.

No. overall	No. in series	Title	Directed by	Written by	Original release date	Viewers (millions)
7	1	"Episode 1"	David Skynner	Matthew Hall	13 January 1999	N/A
8	2	"Episode 2"	David Skynner	Chris Lang	20 January 1999	N/A
9	3	"Episode 3"	Justin Hardy	Stephen Brady	27 January 1999	0.91
10	4	"Episode 4"	Justin Hardy	Lindsey Hill	7 February 1999	N/A
11	5	"Episode 5"	Martin Hutchings	Martin Stone	14 February 1999	N/A
12	6	"Episode 6"	Martin Hutchings	Patrick Melanaphy	21 February 1999	N/A
13	7	"Episode 7"	David Skynner	Peter Palliser	28 February 1999	N/A
14	8	"Episode 8"	David Skynner	Matthew Hall	7 March 1999	N/A
