= Rita Wolf =

British-Indian actress

- Born: Rita Ghose; 25 February 1966 (age 60); Kolkata, India
- Occupations: Actress, director
- Children: Anjeli Chapman; Kiran Chapman
- Awards: Beinecke Fellowship (2024); Drama Desk Award Nomination (Featured Actress)

Rita Wolf (born Rita Ghose) is a British-Indian actress born in Kolkata, India.

== Biography ==
She and writer Rukhsana Ahmad founded the Kali Theatre Company in London, a registered charity that has a goal to encourage, develop, promote and produce the works of Asian female writers. Wolf directed the company's first production, Song for a Sanctuary in 1991, written by Ahmad. Kali is supported by the Arts Council of England.

Wolf has lived in New York City for over three decades. As a child, her daughter, Anjeli Chapman had a major role in the independent film The War Within. Her son, Kiran Chapman was featured as a child in A Heartbeat to Baghdad, a play about the US/Iraq War at The Flea Theatre NYC.

== Filmography ==
- Majdhar (1984) as Fawzia Khan
- The Chain (1984) as Carrie
- My Beautiful Laundrette (1985) as Tania
- Slipstream (1989) as Maya
- Khush (1991)
- Girl 6 (1996)
- Second Generation (2003)

== Television ==
- Wing and a Prayer (UK)
- Calling the Shots (UK)
- Coronation Street (UK) (1990) as Felicity 'Flick' Khan
- Law & Order (US)
- Tandoori Nights (UK)
- The Good Wife (US)

== Theatre ==
- Borderline
- Homebody / Kabul
- The House of Bernarda Alba
- The American Pilot
- Chaos Theory
- An Ordinary Muslim
- The Michaels
- Out of Time
- A Delicate Balance
- Escaped Alone
