= Kali Theatre =

Kali Theatre is a theatre company that specialises in presenting plays by women of South Asian descent. Founded in 1991 by Rita Wolf and Rukhsana Ahmad, Helena Bell became the theatres artistic director in 2016, succeeding Janet Steel. Bell died in 2025.

Kali Theatre was supported by the Arts Council in 2014 for "nurtur[ing] strong individual writers who challenge perceptions through original and thought-provoking theatre".

== History ==
In 1990, after reading about Balwant Kaur, a Sikh woman murdered by her husband in front of their children for running away to a women's refuge, Rita Wolf felt "outraged" that the story was not more widely spread. Wolf found out about writer Rukhsana Ahmad, who was compelled to write about Balwant Kaur's story. Ahmad went on to write Song for a Sanctuary, Kali Theatre's inaugural production, which Wolf directed. Kali was formed after repeated approaches to established venues and companies for help to produce the play failed. Due to this Wolf & Ahmad established Kali Theatre company with Wolf taking on the role of artistic director.

Kali toured plays nationally. Helena Bell became the theatre's artistic director in 2016, succeeding Janet Steel. Bell died in 2025. Playwright Aisha Zia was appointed Artistic Director in September 2025.
