= Hattie Ladbury =

British actress (1974–2022)

- Born: Harriet Louise Ladbury; 20 May 1974; Salisbury, Wiltshire, England
- Died: 20 January 2022 (aged 47)
- Education: South Wilts Grammar School for Girls
- Alma mater: Guildhall School of Music and Drama
- Occupation: Actress

Harriet Louise Ladbury (known as Hattie Ladbury) (20 May 1974 – 20 January 2022) was a British actress.

== Early life ==
Ladbury was born in Salisbury, Wiltshire, England, on 20 May 1974, to Roger Ladbury and Jean Scott. She grew up in Britford, and attended South Wilts Grammar School for Girls. She joined the Salisbury youth theatre group Stage '65 at the age of 10, and was trained at the Guildhall School of Music and Drama, where she won the drama gold medal. She then spent a year with the Forest Forge theatre company at Ringwood.

== Stage work ==
Ladbury's stage work included Catherine Winslow in The Winslow Boy and Silvia in The Game of Love and Chance at the Salisbury Playhouse; Marlene in Top Girls at the Oxford Stage Company; Gwendolen Fairfax in The Importance of Being Earnest at the Bath Theatre Royal; Luciana in The Comedy of Errors at the Sheffield Crucible; Amanda in Private Lives at the Chichester Festival Theatre; Beatrice in Much Ado about Nothing at the Queen's Theatre, Hornchurch; and Hester in The Deep Blue Sea at the Watermill Theatre, Newbury. She performed in five productions at Regent's Park Open Air Theatre: Josephine Vanderwater in Lady, Be Good (2007), Helena in A Midsummer Night's Dream (2007), Lady Macduff in Macbeth (2007), Maudie Atkinson in To Kill a Mockingbird (2013) and Mum / Geraldine in Running Wild (2016). In 2018 she was cast as Sophie in Nine Night at the National Theatre and then on West End transfer. Three weeks before her death, she performed as the Duke in Measure for Measure at the Sam Wanamaker Playhouse, in a performance described by The Guardian's theatre critic Arifa Akbar as "stately and mischievous".

== Film and television ==
Her television work included roles in Sherlock, Jenny in EastEnders, Nurse Banks in Call the Midwife, Scarlett Lyle and Kim Felix in Holby City, Penny Dear, Martha Newman and Nina Fraser in Doctors, Interviewer in Hollyoaks, Miss Keneally in Casualty 1906, Cathy Hewlett in Midsomer Murders, Viv in The Worst Week of My Life, PC Paula Redwin in Family Affairs, and Heidi in Casualty.

Her film work included Beth in The Black Forest, Rich Woman in A Street Cat Named Bob, Princess Alice in Mrs Brown, and the short films Death of a Pet and Emily.

== Personal life ==
Ladbury married Oliver Fenwick, a lighting designer, in 2007; they had two children, Lucy and Ted. She died on 20 January 2022, aged 47, from cancer.
