= Robert Kazinsky =

English actor (born 1983)

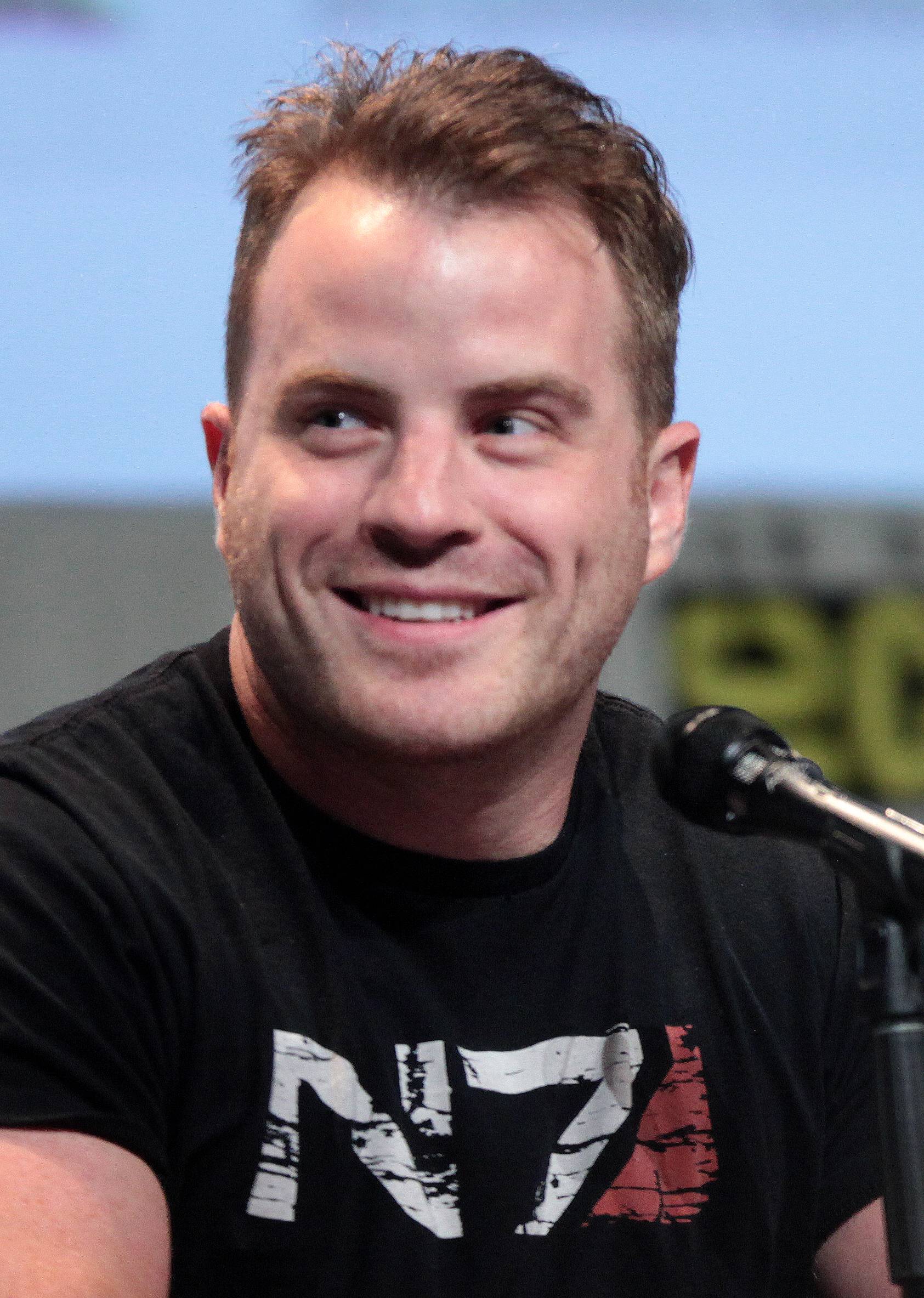
- Kazinsky in 2015
- Born: Robert John Appleby; 18 November 1983 (age 43); Haywards Heath, West Sussex, England
- Education: Guildford School of Acting
- Occupation: Actor
- Years active: 2002–present

Robert John Appleby (born 18 November 1983), known professionally as Robert Kazinsky, is a British-English actor. He is known for his roles as Casper Rose in the Sky One drama Dream Team (2005–2006) and Sean Slater in the BBC soap opera EastEnders (2006–2009, 2019, 2021–2022, 2026–present). In 2013, he portrayed Chuck Hansen in Pacific Rim and Macklyn Warlow in the sixth season of HBO's True Blood. In 2016, he played Orgrim Doomhammer in Warcraft and Jimmy Pritchard in the Fox television series Second Chance. In 2019, he appeared as the Don in Captain Marvel.

== Early life ==
Kazinsky was born Robert John Appleby in Haywards Heath, Sussex, on 18 November 1983. Kazinsky was educated at Hove Park School in Hove as well as K-Bis Theatre School in Brighton, from 1995 to 2000. He appeared in their productions of Bugsy Malone and A Midsummer Night's Dream. Kazinsky trained as an actor at the Guildford School of Acting from September 2002 to July 2005. He took his grandfather's middle name as his stage name.

Kazinsky is Jewish.

He is a fluent speaker of Hebrew.

== Career ==
Kazinsky appeared in Israeli television adverts before he started acting. He made his acting debut in 2005 when he had a guest role in an episode of the CBBC children's programme The Basil Brush Show, playing a character named Sven Garley. Kazinsky then got a role in Sky One's football drama series Dream Team, in which he played Casper Rose from late 2005 to 2006, when he was killed off towards the end of the ninth series, after he announced his intention to leave.

Kazinsky next played Sean Slater in EastEnders; he made his first appearance on 22 August 2006. On 27 March 2007, Kazinsky was suspended from work on EastEnders for two months. A story in The People newspaper alleged that Kazinsky had bombarded a model with "obscene text messages and photographs." Kazinsky issued a statement apologising "for any offence caused and for bringing the show into disrepute". Kazinsky announced he would be leaving the show in October 2008 and made his last appearance in the show on 1 January 2009. On YouTube, Kazinsky was featured as the presenter in the EastEnders launch video when they launched their own video channel on the website.

He made his film debut in 2012 when director George Lucas offered him a part in his Second World War film Red Tails, in which Kazinsky plays a "pilot who has to adapt to being among African-American comrades." In October 2010, Kazinsky was cast in the film The Hobbit: An Unexpected Journey. He would have played Fili, a member of the Company of Dwarves, but in April 2011, Kazinsky resigned from the role for personal reasons. On 9 January 2011, he guest-starred on the drama series Brothers & Sisters as Dr Rick Appleton.

On 13 November 2012, Kazinsky joined the cast of the sixth series of the fantasy drama series True Blood, which was premiered in 2013. That same year Kazinsky appeared in Guillermo del Toro's science-fiction monster film Pacific Rim as Chuck Hansen, an Australian Jaeger pilot.

In March 2015, he was cast in the leading role in the Fox drama series Second Chance. His character, Jimmy Pritchard, was a murdered elderly ex-policeman who is genetically brought back to life as a man in his mid-30s with unusual powers. The series was debuted in 2016. Due to low ratings it was cancelled after one series.

Kazinsky co-starred as Orgrim Doomhammer in the fantasy adventure film Warcraft, based on the video game of the same name which was released in May 2016. An avid World of Warcraft player, Kazinsky credits the game with giving him self-confidence during a period in which he used to be harassed and attacked by people who confused him with the Sean Slater character he played in the soap opera EastEnders.

In 2018 he appeared in the science-fiction film Mute which premiered on Netflix. In 2019 he had a cameo in the Marvel Cinematic Universe film Captain Marvel.

In January 2019, it was announced that Kazinsky would reprise his role of Sean Slater for a guest appearance. He returned to EastEnders for a brief stint which commenced on 26 April 2019. Kazinsky returned for two further one-off appearances, in the episode broadcast on 1 November 2021, and appeared via video call on 7 April 2022. In August 2026, it was announced he would reprise the role of Sean on a permanent basis later in the year. His return was broadcast on 29 October 2026.

== Filmography ==
=== Film ===
| Year | Title | Role | Notes |
|---|---|---|---|
| 2009 | Love | Mikey | Short |
| 2009 | Cowboy | Mark | Short |
| 2012 | Red Tails | Chester Barnes | |
| 2012 | The Hobbit: An Unexpected Journey | Fili | Uncredited |
| 2013 | Pacific Rim | Chuck Hansen | as Rob Kazinsky |
| 2013 | Siren | Guy | |
| 2015 | Hot Pursuit | Randy | |
| 2016 | Warcraft | Orgrim Doomhammer | Voice |
| 2018 | Spivak | Chuck | |
| 2018 | Mute | Rob | as Rob Kazinsky |
| 2019 | For Love or Money | Mark | |
| 2019 | Captain Marvel | Biker (The Don) | |
| 2019 | The Assent | Joel | |
| 2020 | Big America | Henry | |
| 2022 | The Gray Man | Perini | |
| 2025 | Star Trek: Section 31 | Zeph | |

=== Television ===
| Year | Title | Role | Notes |
|---|---|---|---|
| 2005 | The Basil Brush Show | Sven Garley | Episode: "Basil's Brush with Fame" |
| 2005–2006 | Dream Team | Casper Rose | 30 episodes |
| 2006–2009, 2019, 2021–2022, 2026–present | EastEnders | Sean Slater | Series regular |
| 2010 | Law and Order: Los Angeles | Ronnie Powell | Episode: "Sylmar" |
| 2010 | Brothers and Sisters | Dr Rick Appleton | 2 episodes |
| 2013 | Robot Chicken | George Jetson | Voice; Episode: "Robot Fight Accident" |
| 2013 | True Blood | Macklyn Warlow | 9 episodes |
| 2016 | Second Chance | Jimmy Pritchard (revived younger version) | 11 episodes |
| 2016 | Face Off | Himself | Guest judge |

=== Video games ===
| Year | Title | Role | Notes |
|---|---|---|---|
| 2017 | Mass Effect: Andromeda | Archon | Voice |

== Awards and nominations ==
| Year | Group | Award | Nominated work | Result |
|---|---|---|---|---|
| 2006 | British Soap Awards | Sexiest Male | EastEnders | Nominated |
| 2006 | British Soap Awards | Villain of the Year | EastEnders | Nominated |
| 2007 | British Soap Awards | Sexiest Male | EastEnders | Nominated |
| 2007 | British Soap Awards | Villain of the Year | EastEnders | Nominated |
| 2007 | Inside Soap Awards | Sexiest Male | EastEnders | Nominated |
| 2007 | Inside Soap Awards | Best Bad Boy | EastEnders | Nominated |
| 2008 | All About Soap Awards | Fittest Fella | EastEnders | Nominated |
| 2008 | British Soap Awards | Sexiest Male | EastEnders | Nominated |
| 2008 | British Soap Awards | Villain of the Year | EastEnders | Nominated |
| 2008 | Inside Soap Awards | Sexiest Male | EastEnders | Won |
| 2008 | Inside Soap Awards | Best Actor | EastEnders | Won |
| 2008 | Inside Soap Awards | Best Bad Boy | EastEnders | Nominated |
| 2008 | Digital Spy Soap Awards | Most Popular Actor | EastEnders | Nominated |
| 2008 | Digital Spy Soap Awards | Sexiest Male | EastEnders | Nominated |
| 2008 | Digital Spy Soap Awards | Villain of the Year | EastEnders | Nominated |
| 2008 | Soaper Star Awards | Best Actor | EastEnders | Won |
| 2008 | Soaper Star Awards | Best Bad Boy | EastEnders | Nominated |
| 2008 | Soaper Star Awards | Sexiest Male | EastEnders | Won |
| 2009 | EastEnders Awards | Male Hottie | EastEnders | Won |
| 2009 | All About Soap Awards | Killer Secret | EastEnders | Nominated |
| 2009 | All About Soap Awards | Fatal Attraction | EastEnders | Won |
| 2009 | British Soap Awards | Best Actor | EastEnders | Won |
| 2009 | British Soap Awards | Sexiest Male | EastEnders | Nominated |
