= Sean Slater =

- EastEnders character
- Portrayed by: Robert Kazinsky
- Duration: 2006–2009; 2019; 2021–2022; 2026–present
- First appearance: Episode 3209; 22 August 2006
- Created by: Sarah Phelps
- Introduced by: Kate Harwood (2006); Kate Oates (2019, 2022); Jon Sen (2021); Ben Wadey (2026)
In-universe information
- Occupation: Soldier; Market trader (clothing); Barman; Drug dealer; Restaurant owner
- Family: Slater
- Father: Brian Slater
- Mother: Jean Slater
- Sisters: Stacey Slater
- Half-brothers: Kyle Slater
- Half-sisters: Siobhan Slater; Shannon Slater
- Wife: Roxy Mitchell (2008–2009)
- Stepdaughters: Amy Mitchell
- Grandfathers: Russell Hale
- Grandmothers: Violet Slater
- Nephews: Arthur Fowler
- Nieces: Lily Slater; Hope Fowler
- First cousins: Hayley Slater
- Other relatives: Charlie Slater; Kat Slater

Sean Slater is a fictional character from the BBC soap opera EastEnders, portrayed by Robert Kazinsky who made his first appearance on 22 August 2006. It was announced in January 2008 that Kazinsky was exiting the show, with scenes concerning Sean's departure airing on 1 January 2009. He returned for a brief stint between 26 April and 6 May 2019, and for one-off appearances on 1 November 2021 and 7 April 2022. In August 2026, it was announced that Kazinsky would reprise the role on a regular basis, with Sean's return airing on 29 October of that same year.

== Creation ==
Sean was created as an addition to the soap's existing Slater family, comprised initially of sister Stacey Slater (Lacey Turner) and mother Jean Slater (Gillian Wright). He was first mentioned on 9 December 2005 when his sister, Stacey, unfolded a family picture to reveal a fourth member (Sean). It was first announced on 13 April 2006 that the character would be joining EastEnders in the coming months, with the revelation made that: "He's going to enter the Square with a bang and will be at the centre of some of the biggest storylines of the year." A month later, on 18 May 2006, it was announced that Robert Kazinsky had been cast in the role of Sean. Kazinsky said of his casting: "I've grown up with EastEnders so I can't quite believe I'll soon be part of the Slater family."

== Development ==
=== Characterisation and relationships ===
Kazinsky has described his character as "a raging psychopath". Explaining in greater detail his understanding of Sean's personality, he has expanded:

He's a violent person with a violent disposition. He lashes out. He can't differentiate between friend or foe and he won't allow anyone to get close to him. [...] He's not naturally aggressive; he chooses to be because it gets a reaction. It's a cry for help. The reason he challenges the alpha male characters in the Square is that he wants a father figure. He wants someone who can basically run him into the ground, then take him under his wing. [...] He's a nice guy, a good kid. He does the things he does because he just wants someone to help him. He's a charming, affable guy when he wants to be. It's just that you don’t cross him, ever.

Kazinsky has also spoken extensively on several of his character's romantic relationships, declaring in August 2007 that: "Until he knows himself and can forgive himself and actually let his guard down, he's never going to be in a position where he can give to anybody other than himself. At the moment he's a completely selfish, self-serving character." At the time, he speculated that "There's not a single woman who can bring him out of himself, because he's plagued by inner turmoil. Women can have a tempestuous fling with Sean, but they can't ever have love with him, because he doesn't love himself." This idea was expanded on during the character's relationship with Tanya Branning, of which Kazinsky explained: "I don't believe he loves Tanya, I think he's obsessed with her which is a different thing entirely. I think that unconsciously he wants to pay homage to his dad Brian by being the father that he was. And stepping into Max's shoes and taking over his family would have helped him to do that. It's all to do with the guilt he felt over killing his father which is silly really. He didn't stick a knife in him or anything. He hit him and the next day he died of an aneurysm. But as a 16-year-old boy Sean blamed it on himself."

=== Departure (2008) ===
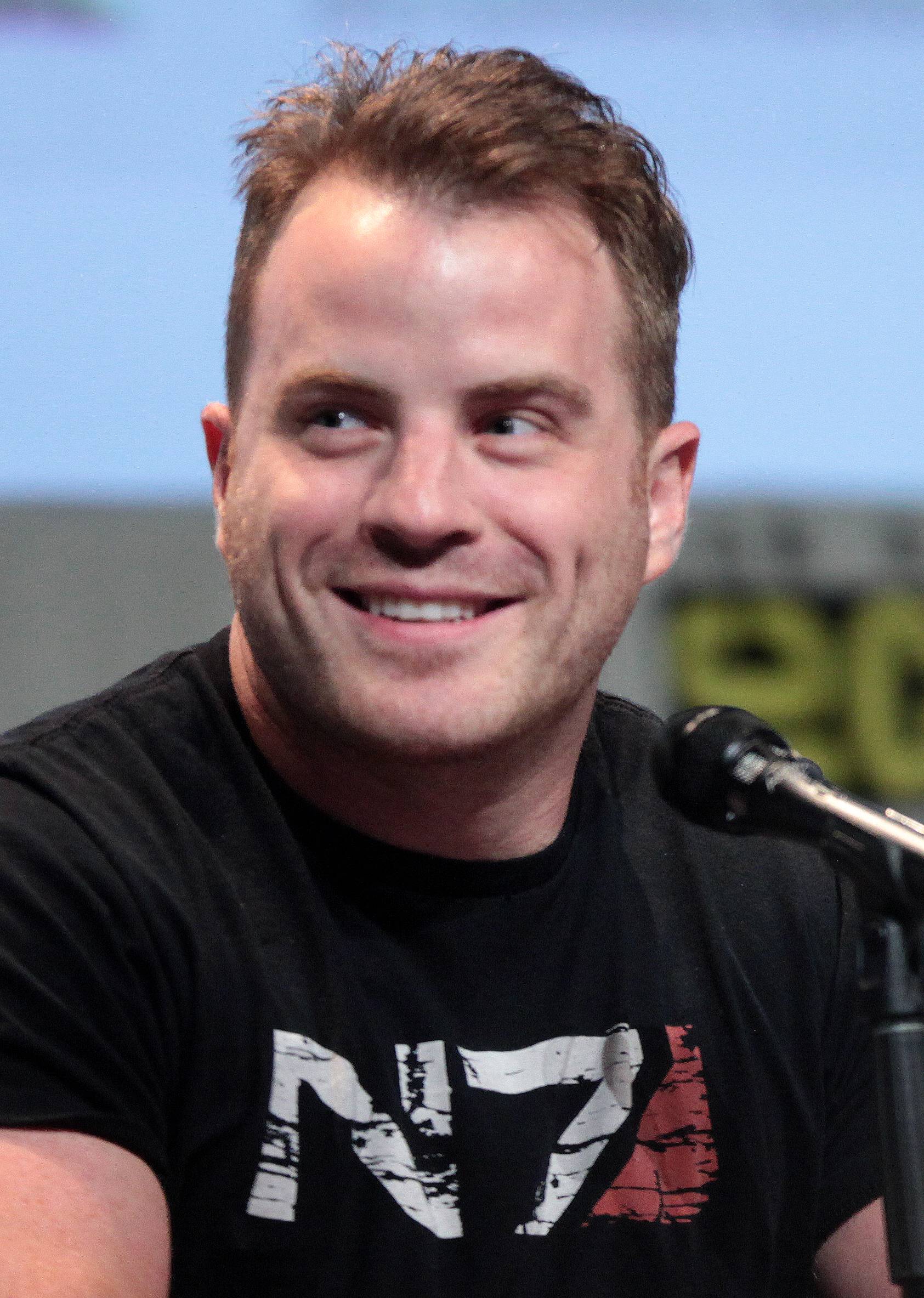
Robert Kazinsky was suspended from the soap in 2007.

In January 2007, Kazinsky was suspended from the show for a period of two months, following allegations he had sent raunchy, inappropriate text messages to a model. The character was temporarily written out of the soap, with a statement released by the BBC which explained: "Following the story in the Sunday People on 7 January 2007, EastEnders executive producer Diederick Santer has taken the decision to suspend Robert Kazinsky from early February for a period of two months. In addition, Robert Kazinsky would like to apologise for any offence caused to EastEnders viewers and for bringing the show into disrepute."

On 18 January 2008, it was announced that the character was to be written out of EastEnders following Kazinsky's decision to quit the soap. The actor said of his decision: "If I had done everything I wanted to do as an actor before I joined EastEnders I would have wanted to stay forever. I have really enjoyed my time with the show – it's such a wonderful place to work and it's become more like a second home to me. I'll be sad to leave." In December 2009, Diederick Santer was asked if anything in the year had not gone as he expected it to. He replied: "[F]or whatever reason, I don't think Sean's exit on New Year's Day was our finest moment. Unusually for EastEnders, we peaked Christmas and New Year with the story and the same bunch of characters and by the time we got to New Year it had rather played out."

=== Returns ===
In May 2009, Kazinsky revealed that he would return to EastEnders if Roxy was leaving and would be part of her leaving storyline. Talking to Digital Spy he said, "I've always said that whatever happens if Rita ever leaves, I want to be in her exit storyline... I'd love to do that." In 2017, Simons did leave EastEnders, but Kazinsky was not a part of her exit storyline.

"It's exciting to work with an actor with Rob's drive, passion, and eye for detail, and I can't wait to see the impact his arrival has on the Square amidst those who loved or loathed the troubled Sean Slater."

— Senior executive producer Kate Oates talking about Sean's return.

On 17 January 2019, it was confirmed that Kazinsky would reprise his role as Sean for a "short stint in the spring", ten years after his exit. Kazinsky's return was previously teased in an interview with senior executive producer Kate Oates that month. In a press release, Kazinsky said that he thought that his "best work was on EastEnders as Sean Slater" because he understood the character and his background well. On his return, the actor commented, "I have unfinished business in Albert Square and am thrilled to be returning to what I still consider to be my home, however briefly." He also looked forward to being involved in his storyline and appearing alongside his on-screen family. Oates praised Sean and Kazinsky, opining that he created "a modern EastEnders icon" through Sean. She confirmed that Kazinsky had involvement in the development of his return story, and added that she looked forward to Sean's return.

Kazinsky made another return for a single episode which was broadcast on 1 November 2021. His return was not announced. Kazinsky later revealed why his return was brief, and expanded on a possible return in the future: "It was simple really, I live in LA and when conditions allow I'll try and see my family every year – or more if I can – so I thought why wouldn't Sean do that. Pop in for a cuppa?" he explained. So I said to Kate [Oates]: 'I'm in London for one day, let's write a scene and I'll swing by in the morning and we can do it, better than that, every time I'm in the UK, if I can, let's do it again' and she rallied the troops and made it happen." He later returned again on 7 April 2022 in an appearance via FaceTime.

=== Reintroduction (2026) ===
On 17 August 2026, it was announced that Kazinsky would reprise his role on a full-time basis, with Sean set to return later that same year. Teasing the character's comeback, executive producer Ben Wadey expressed his enthusiasm, stating, "Sean Slater was a big part of the Slater family, and as viewers will already know, where Sean goes, drama is not far behind." Kazinsky conveyed his gratitude for the opportunity to return to EastEnders and shared his excitement for the upcoming storylines. Sean returned during the 29 October episode.

== Storylines ==
=== Backstory ===
Growing up, Sean adored his father Brian and younger sister Stacey (Lacey Turner), but had a fractured relationship with his mother Jean (Gillian Wright) due to her bipolar disorder. He became rebellious, constantly going out of his way to scare Jean. Sean punched his father during an argument. The next day, Brian suffered a brain haemorrhage and died whilst working on a building site. Believing that he killed his father, Sean panicked and on his sixteenth birthday, he ran away, joined the army and lost all contact with his family. Stacey, aged 11, was left alone to take care of their mother.

=== 2006–2009 ===
Sean Slater first appears in August 2006, seeking revenge on his old friend Al (Andrew McKay) after the latter ended up causing Sean to be kicked out of the Army. Sean breaks into Al's flat and follows him into The Queen Victoria public house, where he ends up seeing his sister Stacey, whom he had lost contact with for seven years. After taking revenge on Al, Sean decides to stay in Walford to look after Stacey. Sean immediately begins pursuing Tanya Branning (Jo Joyner), despite briefly dumping her for Stacey's best-friend Ruby Allen (Louisa Lytton) after learning that she is wealthy. Sean soon begins forging his relationship with Ruby in order to secret exploit control of her financial assets. However, his plan is quickly discovered by Ruby's business partner Jake Moon (Joel Beckett), whom he begins clashing with in the process. Their feud escalates when Ruby confides to Sean that Jake had killed his younger brother Danny (Jake Maskall) to stop him from murdering the "Mitchell brothers", consisting of the square's local hardman Phil Mitchell (Steve McFadden) and his younger brother Grant (Ross Kemp), at the behest of their crime boss and Ruby's father, Johnny Allen (Billy Murray).

Later on, Jake informs Johnny of Sean's plan and subsequently tells Sean that Johnny wishes to meet him in person; Johnny has recently been sentenced to life imprisonment for his criminal activities, specifically for the murders of his gangland rival Andy Hunter (Michael Higgs) and his best-friend Dennis Rickman (Nigel Harman). The next day, Sean visits Johnny and attempts to fabricate his story by proclaiming that his intentions are to create goodwill for Ruby and her future. However, Johnny does not buy it and threatens to have Sean killed unless he leaves Ruby alone. At first Sean appears to feel intimidated, but he then surprises Johnny by taunting him over his real plans for Ruby before leaving prison. This enrages Johnny, who then attempts to have Sean killed by phoning Jake to carry out the order, but he ends up having a heart attack and dies before Ruby can visit him; Jake then leaves Walford after learning about his boss' death. Following Johnny's funeral, Sean proposes marriage to Ruby. They begin to plan out a wedding until Ruby learns of Sean's plan, and Sean also grows irritated when she attempts to help mend his relationship with Jean. Eventually, they split and Ruby leaves Walford afterwards. Sean then continues to pursue Tanya, only to end up having sex with numerous other women – including Karin Jones (Anna Lauren) and Preeti Choraria (Babita Pohoomull).

In 2007, Sean starts dating Chelsea Fox (Tiana Benjamin) and also has sex with her stepsister Carly Wicks (Kellie Shirley), causing a number of arguments. Scorned, Chelsea and Deano Wicks (Matt Di Angelo) try to get revenge on Sean by attempting to frame him for assaulting shopkeeper Patrick Trueman (Rudolph Walker). Sean's attempt to escape arrest fails and he is held on remand. From prison, Sean has Deano attacked so Carly ends the relationship, but discovers that Chelsea has CCTV footage proving that Sean did not attack Patrick. Despite her family's protests, Carly takes the footage to the police. Sean is released, and Deano and Chelsea are arrested for conspiracy to pervert the course of justice. Sean gets revenge on Deano by giving him a bogwash and he also cuts Chelsea's hair.

Sean and Tanya start dating at the beginning of 2008, and Sean tells her that he was responsible for his father's death. In March 2008, they plot to fake Tanya's reconciliation with her estranged husband Max (Jake Wood) in order to gain control of his assets and then leave the country. Tanya pretends to split up with Sean and reunite with Max, but secretly they conspire to bury Max alive. However Tanya feels guilty and releases Max. Much to Sean's surprise, Tanya scorns and rejects him when he says he wants them to be a family and reveals that she used him to get revenge on Max. Sean threatens to tell her children what she has done but Tanya retaliates by threatening to tell Stacey that Sean killed their father. Sean keeps quiet but takes the rejection hard. He then begins to torment his flatmate Gus Smith (Mohammed George). Sean reveals that he plans to kill Gus and make it look like suicide, but Stacey stops him and makes him move back in with the Slaters. Roxy and Sean split up, and Gus reveals to the Slaters that Sean is involved in drugs.

By then, Sean has begun a relationship with Phil's cousin Roxy (Rita Simons), who soon reveals that she is pregnant. This causes Sean to believe that he is the father, but is left unaware that Roxy had a one-night stand with Max's younger brother Jack (Scott Maslen). He offers to support her but Roxy refuses his offer and returns to Ibiza. Sean leaves Albert Square briefly and returns in July after learning that Roxy is in Weymouth with her father, Archie (Larry Lamb), so he goes to see her. Archie encourages Roxy to stay in Weymouth with him, but her sister Ronnie (Samantha Womack) and Sean persuade her to return to Walford, and she moves in with him. Ronnie disapproves of Roxy and Sean's relationship as she suspects him of selling drugs, but comes round after they get married in August. Sean has a difficult relationship with Roxy's father, Archie, and is unhappy about accepting his money for a deposit on a flat. In November 2008, when Roxy goes into premature labour, Archie pretends to call Sean, but does not, so he misses the birth of Amy.

In December 2008, Jack asks Roxy for a paternity test. She receives the results and hides them away; however, Archie finds them and makes a copy. A few weeks later, Archie persuades Jack and Max's sister Suzy (Maggie O'Neill) to help him reveal the DNA test results to Sean on Christmas Day. Sean is devastated and attacks Jack, Amy's biological father, then goes on the rampage, kidnapping Amy. On New Year's Day 2009, Sean asks Stacey to look after Amy for a few days, knowing that she will return her to Roxy. Sean soon returns himself, and convinces Roxy to leave with him and Amy, but she is scared, and calls Ronnie, so she and Jack follow them. Sean drives them to an icy lake, intending to drive into the water and drown as a family. Roxy escapes but cannot get Amy out, so when she sees Ronnie and Jack arrive, Roxy coaxes Sean out onto the ice so they can rescue Amy. With Ronnie and Jack watching, the ice breaks, and Sean and Roxy go under. Sean frees Roxy from the weeds that she has got entangled in, as Ronnie dives into the water to rescue her. Roxy and Ronnie escape safely, but there is no sign of Sean. Roxy then sees Sean crawling out of the water whilst Ronnie and Jack are warming up back at the car. She signals to him to leave and Sean walks away.

In May 2015, Stacey makes a videocall to Sean via Skype; while he does not appear on-screen, he reminds her to take care of her mystery key due to its link to their father. When Jean reacts badly upon seeing her with the key, Stacey attempts to find out what the key represents, but Jean catches her and, unwilling to tell her the truth other than Sean apparently could not trust her with it, seemingly throws it down the toilet. However, after Stacey leaves, it is revealed that Jean still has the key. She returns the key to Stacey four months later, revealing that it unlocks a safety deposit box in which Brian left Stacey and Sean some information about his other family, but Sean took the key from Jean after Brian's death before she could give it to Stacey when she turned 21.

=== 2019 ===
When Jean is diagnosed with ovarian cancer in March 2019, she wants Stacey to help her contact Sean. Though Stacey claims she does not know Sean's contact details or whereabouts, Kat Moon (Jessie Wallace) finds out that Stacey had contacted Sean weeks earlier and told him about Jean's cancer. Stacey claims that Sean acted strangely and talked morbidly about Jean dying during the phone call. After much hesitation, Stacey gives Sean's number to Jean, who leaves a voicemail message.

Several days later, Sean secretly picks up Amy from school. He proceeds to learn about Amy, talking about Roxy with her and realising how much Amy resembles her mother. Not realising that Roxy died in 2017, Sean says something insensitive about her which upsets Amy so she asks to be taken home. Sean tells Jack that Amy had been with him and asks to see Roxy. Jack drives Sean to the graveyard and shows him where Ronnie and Roxy are buried and talks about Roxy dragging Ronnie down, resulting in both sisters dying on his and Ronnie's wedding night. A fight ensues when Jack continues to insult Roxy. Sean is left at the graveside where he apologizes to Roxy for how things ended between them and tells her he will be joining her soon. Sean and Jean reunite at The Queen Vic where, after a brief confrontation with Ruby, he takes Jean to her chemotherapy appointment. After Sean scares Jean by asking morbid questions, Stacey takes him aside and rebukes him for his actions, wishing he would be a normal person. Though Sean admits he cares about their family, Stacey tells him he is a damaged person and should leave Walford for Jean's sake. When Jean is adamant that she will not let him walk out on her again, Sean suggests that they run away together. They take a trip to the countryside, where he helps her shave her head bald. While they are out on a walk, Jean injures her leg when falling on a sharp metal wire. Jean hides her injury from Sean but he later finds out, calls for an ambulance and tries to stop her from bleeding.

When Jean tells Sean that she thinks she is going to die, Sean confesses that he killed his father, Brian. As he goes into detail about his crime she begins to drift out of consciousness. When Sean leaves the room, a dazed Jean asks for Sean and tells him that she loves him. Sean retreats to the barn, intending to commit suicide by shooting himself. Recovering from the injury, Jean tells Stacey what Sean did and they both find him at the barn. Jean reassures Sean that he is not a bad person for his actions, and that Brian had been living a double life with another family the entire time. Sean agrees to let go of the gun and collapses in tears as Jean comforts him. After spending the weekend at the Slater house and quickly becoming overwhelmed, he asks to be left alone for time to gather his thoughts. Jean finds a nearby flat for Sean to live in, but when she comes home to tell him, she finds him having packed his bags to leave Walford. He reveals he has booked an appointment at a mental health facility to get the help he needs. After saying an emotional goodbye to Jean and giving her a ringtone for when he will call her, he also says goodbye to Amy, promising to take her to Ronnie and Roxy's bar in Ibiza on her 18th birthday.

=== 2021–2022 ===
In November 2021, it is revealed that Stacey has married a prison inmate called Eve Unwin (Heather Peace), a former solicitor who tries to help Stacey fight her eviction. However, Jean does not trust Eve and enlists Sean's help in making her leave. Sean does so by convincing Eve that she will cause trouble for Stacey. Stacey is unhappy to learn about Sean's involvement and informs him that Eve was only trying to help. Before leaving, Sean tells Jean to call him if she needs anything. Five months later, Stacey is worried that Jean is having an episode of her bipolar disorder and calls Sean to speak to her. Sean video calls Jean, but she assures him that she is fine. Sean accepts this and sends Stacey a bouquet of flowers telling her not to worry about Jean. However, Stacey bins them.

In February 2025, Stacey goes to stay with Sean for a few weeks, struggling to cope with the death of her ex-husband, Martin Fowler (James Bye), in an explosion at the Queen Vic. A few months later, Sean invites Stacey and her children to live with him in Brazil, but does not invite Jean, leaving her hurt. Stacey accepts the offer and leaves Walford for Brazil with her children Arthur (Rocco Brenner) and Hope (Isabelle Smith) in October 2025.

=== 2026–present ===
In October 2026, Sean returns to Walford and promises to help Jack rescue Amy (Ellie Dadd), who has been groomed and kidnapped by Craig Ingram (Matthew James-Bailey).

== Reception ==
In 2020, Sara Wallis and Ian Hyland from the Daily Mirror placed Sean 63rd on their ranked list of the best EastEnders characters of all time, calling him Stacey's "brooding" brother who "had affairs with half the women in Walford and picked fights with most of the gangsters".
