= Nine nights =

Funerary tradition of the Caribbean

Nine-Night, also known as Dead Yard, is a funerary tradition originating from the Asante people of Western Africa and practiced in several Caribbean countries (primarily Jamaica). It is an extended wake that lasts for nine days, with roots from the Akan culture during a 9-day period of observing the dead known as Dabɔnɛ(say: dah-boh-neh). During this time, friends and family come together to the home of the deceased. They share their condolences and memories while singing hymns and eating food together.

In the old days, the nights were calm and reserved for the most part - but that tradition has changed with the times. Today, these gatherings resemble parties much more than they resemble wakes (though this is not true of every "nine-night").

== Traditions ==
Nine-Nights are no longer a time to mourn, but a time to celebrate since the loved one is no longer suffering in life. When friends come they do not come with just condolences, instead they come with food, drink and music; this is after all a celebration. True to its name this celebration lasts nine nights and days with the ninth and final night being the night before the church service (Though some modern Islanders only celebrate for seven days and seven nights). On the ninth night the family prepares the food for all who come.

As tradition has it, on the ninth night the spirit of the deceased passes through the party gathering food and saying goodbye before continuing on to its resting place. Out of all the nights this night is the most revered since it is the end of the celebration. Stories about the deceased and the fondest memories are shared, along with prayers. Games, such as dominoes, are played and there is the singing of hymns, which is also done on the other nights as well.

On the ninth night a table is set up under a tent with food for the loved one, though no one is allowed to eat from it before midnight, which is believed to be the time when the spirit passes through. Along with the food are drinks, most often Jamaican rum with no less than 100 proof. The types of food on the table can vary from one celebration to the next, but typically fried fish and bammy or bread are the main foods on the table. This time is very important to the family because it gives them the opportunity to celebrate the life of their loved one and to be able to say their goodbyes. This celebration is done with an ancestral practice in Jamaica called Kumina.

In order for the deceased to move on there is a process that must happen. First, there is the "seeing". This is when someone looks at a doorway and sees the spirit. They then tell someone and that person tells someone and so on. The leader of the ceremony greets the duppy (spirit) and then the night song begins. This is a song played for the duppy while he or she is told stories by the elders. Traditionally on the ninth night of the deceased's death their bed and mattress are turned up against the wall, in order to encourage the spirit (Jamaican patois "duppy") to leave the house and enter the grave. Then the leader of the ceremony uses a piece of white chalk to draw a cross over the exit that the spirit used to leave, allowing the spirit to never return.

In Trinidad and Tobago many Christians participate in a "wake" in the days leading up to the funeral service which resembles the 'nine night' traditions of other islands. In this country, Christians celebrate the "nine-night" service nine days after the death of the deceased which may coincide with a few days after the funeral service and burial.

== See also ==
- Wake (ceremony)
- Shiva (Judaism)
- Jazz funeral
- Month's Mind
- Nine Days (film)
- Kumina
