= Liam Butcher =

Fictional character from EastEnders

- EastEnders character
- Alfie Deegan as Liam Butcher (2021)
- Portrayed by: Sonny Bottomley (1998–1999); Jack & Tom Godolphin (1999–2000); Gavin & Mitchell Vaughan (2002); Nathaniel Gleed (2002–2004); James Forde (2008–2015); Alfie Deegan (2021)
- Duration: 1998–2000, 2002–2004, 2008–2015, 2021
- First appearance: Episode 1715; 25 December 1998
- Last appearance: Episode 6363/6364; 14 December 2021
- Introduced by: Matthew Robinson (1998); John Yorke (2000, 2002); Diederick Santer (2008); Jon Sen (2021)
- Spin-off appearances: Ricky & Bianca (2002); Last Tango in Walford (2010); EastEnders: E20 (2010–2011)
- James Forde as Liam Butcher (2012)
In-universe information
- Occupation: Fast food worker; Café worker
- Family: Beale/Branning
- Father: Ricky Butcher
- Mother: Bianca Jackson
- Sisters: Tiffany Butcher
- Half-brothers: Morgan Butcher
- Half-sisters: Whitney Dean (adoptive); Kira Salter
- Grandfathers: David Wicks; Frank Butcher
- Grandmothers: Carol Jackson; June Butcher
- Uncles: Joe Wicks; Robbie Jackson; Billie Jackson
- Aunts: Sonia Fowler; Janine Butcher; Diane Butcher; Clare Butcher
- Nieces: Dolly Dean-Hudson (adoptive)
- First cousins: Bex Fowler; Sami Jackson; Jacques Butcher; Scarlett Butcher; Julia Fowler; Holly
- Other relatives: Pat Butcher; Norman Simmonds; Jim Branning; Derek Branning; Jack Branning; Max Branning; Alice Branning; Ian Beale; Martin Fowler

Liam Butcher is a fictional character from the BBC soap opera EastEnders, played by Sonny Bottomley for two months in 1998 and 1999, twins Jack and Tom Godolphin from 1999, Gavin and Mitchell Vaughan in 2002, and Nathaniel Gleed from 2002 to 2004. Upon his reintroduction in 2008, the character was portrayed by James Forde. Liam is the son of Bianca Jackson (Patsy Palmer) and Ricky Butcher (Sid Owen) and his stories have mostly revolved around his family. The character took a six-month break in 2012 for story purposes. Following his return, producers used Liam in a story about gangs, working with the charity Comic Relief. Forde was written out permanently in 2015 and Liam departs in the episode first broadcast on 17 August 2015. Liam was reintroduced for a short stint in 2021, with the role recast to Alfie Deegan.

== Creation and development ==
Liam is a character that was born in the serial; the first son of Bianca (Patsy Palmer) and Ricky Butcher (Sid Owen) who was conceived following the forced abortion of their first daughter in 1997 after she was diagnosed with spina bifida. Bianca's pregnancy with Liam was used by the programme makers to spread a public message in 1998; the scriptwriters included scenes of a practitioner advising Bianca to take folic acid, which protects against spina bifida. The Association for Spina Bifida and Hydrocephalus (ASBAH) issued a public plea to EastEnders, urging them to allow Bianca's second baby to be born with spina bifida, in order to show parents that having a baby with spina bifida is "not the end of the world". This did not occur, however, and Bianca was shown to give birth to a premature but healthy baby Liam in an episode that aired on Christmas Day 1998.

Following three separate stints in EastEnders played by different child/baby actors – most substantially from 2002 to 2004, when Liam returned to Albert Square as part of his father Ricky's reintroduction – Liam returned in a more prominent role in 2008, played by James Forde. His return was confirmed on 29 October 2007 following the announcement that Patsy Palmer and Sid Owen were reprising their roles as Bianca and Ricky; he reappeared on-screen in April 2008. Upon his return, it was said that Liam had "taken to being the man of the house", and was described as "not very academic, but [...] always willing to try new things – a trait which sees him quite often in trouble. His laddish demeanour, however, is softened by the affection he is not afraid to show his mum." As part of the reintroduction of Bianca, four children, including Liam, were scripted into the character's narrative, including Whitney Dean (Shona McGarty), the sixteen-year-old daughter of Bianca's deceased partner; Tiffany Dean (Maisie Smith), Bianca's five-year-old daughter; and Morgan Jackson-King (Devon Higgs), Bianca's two-year-old son, "the most [spoilt] out of all of the kids".

To promote the family's introduction, the BBC began airing trailers across the BBC network in March 2008. One trailer saw Bianca singing The Jackson 5 hit "I Want You Back" and performing a dance routine along with her four children. The promo uses the tag line "Introducing The Jackson 5". Within three days of being posted on the video sharing website YouTube, the promo had been viewed 52,000 times.

Palmer and Lindsey Coulson, who portrays Liam's grandmother Carol Jackson, took a break from the series for six months in 2012. Producers wrote out Liam, Tiffany and Morgan in conjunction with their break. They departed in April 2012.

=== Gang involvement ===
In January 2013, it was reported that Liam would be involved in a gang storyline, starting in March. Digital Spy said Liam "[goes] off the rails when he gets involved with a gang in an upcoming storyline." They said the storyline would run "for a while", and Forde had tweeted about being "very busy" at work with "great stuff coming up". It emerged that EastEnders producers had worked with charity Comic Relief to "highlight the growing problem of teen involvement in gangs." The plot was called "hard-hitting", and it was reported that Bianca would try to get Liam to choose between the gang and his family, though his choice remained to be seen. EastEnders undertook research into why teenagers become involved in gangs and the effects the it can have. Executive Producer Lorraine Newman said of the storyline, "We are delighted to be working with Comic Relief once again. This subject matter is something which is touching the lives of so many young people in London and other cities around the UK. We have taken the opportunity to see the impact from a mother's perspective, and Patsy Palmer gives a powerful performance of a mother doing all she can to protect her son. The telling of this story has also given us the chance to explore the reasons behind the attraction of gangs for teenagers." Judith McNeill, Grants Director for Comic Relief, added: "Comic Relief is really excited to be working with EastEnders again to highlight an important issue supported by Red Nose Day. [...] This year's storyline should play an [...] important role in promoting greater understanding of why young people are vulnerable to becoming involved in gangs." The storyline included a six-minute episode broadcast during Red Nose Day on 15 March 2013.

=== Departure (2015) ===
On 27 April 2015, it was announced that Forde would be written out but exact details of his exit were being kept under wraps. James Forde tweeted; "Absolutely honoured to have a world with some of the people I have worked with. It's amazing and the future is exciting." The character made his final appearance on 17 August 2015.

=== Return (2021) ===
A return for the character was speculated in September 2021 after his name was released in an upcoming episode synopsis online. The character made an unannounced return in the episode first broadcast on 1 October 2021. Producers chose to recast the role and actor Alfie Deegan took over the role. He returns for a guest stint. Liam's return story sees him arrive to Walford under the guise of supporting Tiffany but with an ulterior motive. Forde, who changed careers after leaving EastEnders, was not disgruntled by the recast and expressed his happiness with his new career. Liam's guest stint ends in the episode first broadcast on 14 December 2021. His exit story ties in with Tiffany's exit from the series as they both move to Germany together.

== Storylines ==
=== 1998–2004 ===
The son of Ricky (Sid Owen) and Bianca Butcher (Patsy Palmer), Liam is born prematurely on Christmas Day 1998, in The Queen Victoria public house. In September 1999, Liam's parents separate and Bianca takes him to Manchester. Despite returning to Walford briefly in April 2000 to visit his father, Liam rarely sees Ricky.

In May 2002, Ricky visits him with his fiancée Cassie to discuss custody of Liam. Following a series of events, Bianca gives Liam to Ricky. Shortly afterwards, Ricky and Liam return to Walford but leave in 2004. Off-screen, Liam is returned to Bianca in 2008, following Ricky's engagement to Melinda (Siobhan Hayes), who did not want children.

=== 2008–2015 ===
Liam returns to Walford with his mother and siblings, Tiffany Dean (Maisie Smith), Morgan Jackson-King (Devon Higgs) and Whitney Dean (Shona McGarty), in April 2008 after they are evicted by their landlord. He and his siblings spend a week in care due to the police finding them homeless and Bianca assaulting a police officer, Liam settles back in Walford, living with Bianca, Ricky and his great-grandmother Pat Evans (Pam St Clement). Later that year, Liam begins skipping school, feigning illness and it is subsequently revealed that he is dyslexic, explaining his inferior grades and repeated absences. Ricky takes an active role in Liam's schooling, helping to improve his grades. With secondary school approaching, Liam is denied a place at Walford High and is offered a place at King Edward V, which Bianca and Ricky think is too far away. Their appeal is unsuccessful so Bianca decides to homeschool Liam instead. However, when Bianca and her mother Carol (Lindsey Coulson) argue, Liam says he will go to King Edward V and will work hard. However, before he starts there, he worries that none of his old friends will be there and sneaks out to the park, where Carol's date Lewis Daley (Deka Walmsley) gives him encouragement and tells him that life is never easy.

At Liam's uncle Billie Jackson's (Devon Anderson) birthday party, Liam sees Kim Fox (Tameka Empson) drunkenly kiss Ricky. The morning after, Liam, Tiffany and Morgan are told Billie is unwell, but Liam correctly guesses that he has died. Later, he is angry at Kim and sends her away when she brings food to the house. He then talks to Ricky, and Bianca overhears him saying Kim kissed Ricky. When Morgan accidentally squirts tomato ketchup over Billie's hoody, Liam tries to wash off the stain but is caught by Carol; who slaps him on his face, causing his forehead to bleed. Although they make amends, Bianca discovers the cut, which causes an argument. Carol then bans the family from attending Billie's funeral. Carol embarks on an affair with a friend of Billie's, Connor Stanley (Arinzé Kene), but Connor continues to see Whitney. Tiffany sees this and tells Liam, who encourages her to keep quiet as he worries it will split up the family. Liam eventually tells Ricky but Bianca has already found out and beaten Connor, leaving him unconscious. Liam is upset when Bianca gives herself in to the police. He is then suspended from school for hitting another boy. Bianca is subsequently sent to prison, and Ricky later leaves for a six-month job in Dubai. Liam makes friends with Eddie Moon (David Essex), who Carol is interested in romantically. However, when Eddie allows Liam to skip school for three days so Eddie can teach him about antiques, Carol tells Eddie to stay away from her and Liam. Liam continues to be friends with Eddie and is looking after his stock when Lola Pearce (Danielle Harold) takes him away and burns the stock. Eddie gives Liam a job after he moves his antiques business to Walford, and Lola confesses to Liam that she started the fire. Liam is happy when Carol and Eddie begin a relationship, but is saddened when they break up and Eddie leaves Walford.

When Lola, Ben Mitchell (Joshua Pascoe) and Liam's cousin Abi Branning (Lorna Fitzgerald) want to steal alcohol from a party at Kim Fox's (Tameka Empson) bed and breakfast, they get Liam to dress up in a Halloween costume to do it for them. He steals a bowl of punch, which they drink in the local launderette. Kim later finds them and takes the punch back. Lola pays Liam to take a bag from Phil Mitchell (Steve McFadden) but is caught, forcing him to reveal that Lola told him to take the bag. In December 2011, the family begin to have financial difficulties, and Liam becomes hostile towards Ricky, blaming him for their situation. After the local bed and breakfast burns down, Liam is paid by his uncle Derek Branning (Jamie Foreman) to enter the building and find scrap metal. Liam is upset by the death of Pat and the departure of his father, Ricky. Although Bianca and Ricky tell Liam it is only temporary, Liam knows it is permanent. Liam then gets a part-time job cleaning to help out the family with money. Bianca is later caught stealing money and returns to prison, but this time located in Suffolk. Liam then moves to Suffolk with the rest of his family to be near his mother, but returns to Walford with his family in November 2012. After the death of Derek on Christmas 2012, Liam finds the smuggled goods Derek has been hiding in the Jackson garage he tells Bianca who calls the police but when Bianca opens the garage to show the police the smuggled goods, everything is gone. It is revealed that Liam has done a deal with Michael Moon (Steve John Shepherd) to sell them.

Liam starts truanting from school and is brought home to Bianca by the police. Bianca is warned that if he continues, she could receive a fine or go back to prison. Liam promises to go to school the next day but does not, and tells Bianca she thinks he is a loser and knows nothing about him. Liam becomes involved in a gang, who mug Tamwar Masood (Himesh Patel). The gang leader, Kane (Harry Rafferty) gives Liam Tamwar's money belt, which Bianca finds. She suspects he has joined the gang, and confronts them at an estate, where she tells Liam to come home, but he stays with them. The next morning, Liam returns home and refuses to go to school, so Bianca locks him in his room to stop him seeing the gang, and also slaps him. Liam manipulates Whitney into letting him out, and he runs away. He returns to the gang, who initiate him into the gang by making him shoplift alcohol, smash a car window and mug his colleague Shirley Carter (Linda Henry). Shirley realises it is Liam and sends him away with £10. The gang then throw Liam a party, but the police arrive and arrest the gang over Tamwar's mugging. Liam refuses to talk to the police and is released on bail without charge. Liam wants to talk to Kane, and when he finds the gang, they blame him for their arrests, and one of the gang members, Little Chris (Rizwan Shebani) stabs Liam on Kane's orders. Bianca sees this and Liam is rushed to hospital, where the police offer him help but only if he tells them the truth. Bianca leaves the decision to Liam. He eventually tells them the truth but this only makes the situation worse when the entire gang including Little Chris are bailed without charge once again as they deny any involvement in Liam's stabbing. Fearing the gang may harm his family, Liam arranges to live with his father Ricky but later changes his mind. Liam receives death threats from Kane, which leads to a final confrontation after which Kane is arrested again and Liam goes to stay with Ricky. Liam then returns for the court case, but does not need to give evidence because Little Chris changes his plea to guilty.

Liam settles into living in Walford again and soon develops a crush on Cindy Williams (Mimi Keene). Liam is shocked when Ian Beale (Adam Woodyatt) accuses him of having had underage sex with Cindy and threatens to report him to police, forcing Cindy to confess that she made it up to impress TJ Spraggan (George Sargeant). A drunk Cindy later kisses Liam and he loses his virginity to her. Ian discovers that Cindy is pregnant but Liam denies responsibility and is furious when TJ reveals himself to be the father. Liam discovers that Carol has breast cancer and supports her through her treatment. Bianca decides to move the family to Milton Keynes following Carol's recovery but a reluctant Liam is eventually allowed to stay in Walford. Cindy kisses Liam after she tells him that she is struggling to be a mother to Beth. Liam stops the kiss, knowing that Cindy is upset. Liam develops a sexual relationship with Cindy. Liam supports Cindy through her parental struggles, but Beth is eventually handed over to TJ. Ian throws Cindy out, so Liam hides her in his room, which Carol eventually discovers. Cindy tells Liam that Bobby killed Lucy and Liam threatens to tell the police, but Ian gives Liam and Cindy a ticket to leave for good. Carol finds out about this and Liam demands £100,000 for him and Cindy to leave Walford to live with Ricky in Germany or he tells Carol and the police that Bobby killed Lucy. However, Ricky informs Liam he cannot take any money, but he relents when Jane promises him recurring payments. He and Cindy then leave Walford together after saying goodbye to their families.

=== 2021 ===
Liam returns to Walford in October 2021, deciding to reunite with Tiffany and Whitney. He enters into a rivalry with Tiffany's husband Keegan Baker (Zack Morris) over his liaison with Dotty Cotton (Milly Zero), which has ended his marriage with Tiffany. Keegan becomes suspicious of Liam, and he tells Tiffany that he is running a garage in Germany, but it is discovered that he has been lying and is penniless. Liam decides to stay in Walford to help Tiffany recover from her separation with Keegan, and approaches Ben Mitchell (Max Bowden) for a job at The Arches. He soon starts to ignore Cindy's calls and is confronted by her half brother, Peter Beale (Dayle Hudson), when Cindy asks Peter for money. He schemes with his aunt Janine Butcher (Charlie Brooks) and Billy Mitchell (Perry Fenwick) to steal cars and sell them. One of their operations is nearly unsuccessful when Liam accidentally abducts Frankie Lewis (Rose Ayling-Ellis) when she is trapped inside the booth of the car. He turns on Janine when she refuses to give him his share of the money, and is later manipulated by her to steal the car keys of one of Tiffany's clients. Keegan suspicions of Liam continues and he exposes his plans to Tiffany, but Liam deceives her. He drives a wedge between the pair by convincing Tiffany to start dating resident Aaron Monroe (Charlie Wernham), making Keegan jealous. After receiving money from his quick money schemes, Liam decides to return to Germany, and Tiffany decides to follow him following the breakdown of her fling with Aaron. Tiffany decides to write a heartfelt letter to Keegan asking him to meet her at the train station so they can reconcile, but Liam switches the letters, leaving Tiffany devastated when Keegan does not show up. Liam and Tiffany then leave together. Months later, Tiffany returns and realises that Liam swapped the letters. She then reconciles with Keegan and they leave for Germany together. In 2023, it is revealed by Cindy’s half brother Peter Beale (Thomas Law) that Liam and Cindy have broken up and are not on speaking terms.

== Reception ==
Kate White of Inside Soap praised Forde's acting during Liam's gang involvement storyline, but admitted she could not see the appeal of gangs: "The Bianca and Liam story was brilliantly acted – but we really couldn't see what the great appeal of gang life was supposed to have been. It seemed to be all dingy bedsits and general skulking about."
