= List of EastEnders characters introduced in 2013 =

EastEnders logo

The following are characters who first appeared in the BBC soap opera EastEnders during 2013, listed by order of first appearance. New characters were introduced by Lorraine Newman, executive producer until December 2013, when Dominic Treadwell-Collins took over.

The first character to be announced was Dexter Hartman (Khali Best), the teenage son of Ava Hartman (Clare Perkins). He was introduced in January. Steve Lowe (Michael Simkins), Bianca Jackson's (Patsy Palmer) probation officer and a love interest for Carol Jackson (Lindsey Coulson), arrived as a recurring character in February, and in March, Kane and his gang appeared for a storyline involving Liam Butcher (James Forde). Dexter's father Sam James (Cornell John) arrived in May. Kirsty Branning's (Kierston Wareing) ex-boyfriend Carl White (Daniel Coonan) joined the show in June. Two short-term characters, Betty Spragg (Tessa Wyatt), and Ollie Walters (Tony O'Callaghan), arrived in July. Sadie Young (Kate Magowan) arrived on the show in August, as the new owner of the beauty salon. Former Hollyoaks actor Jamie Lomas made his first appearance in August as well, playing Jake Stone. Upon the announcement that established character David Wicks (Michael French) was returning to the show, Lisa Maxwell was cast as his girlfriend, Naomi, who appeared in September for one episode. Terry Alderton, playing Terry Spraggan, made his debut in November, along with his children TJ (George Sargeant) and Rosie (Jerzey Swingler). Former Holby City actress Luisa Bradshaw-White was cast as Shirley Carter's (Linda Henry) younger sister Tina, who first appeared in November, followed in December by Shirley's brother, who later transpired to be her son, Mick Carter (Danny Dyer), Mick's partner, Linda (Kellie Bright), and their youngest son, Johnny (Sam Strike).

== Dexter Hartman ==
Dexter Hartman, played by Khali Best, is the son of Ava Hartman (Clare Perkins) and grandson of Cora Cross (Ann Mitchell). He made his first appearance on 7 January 2013. The casting and character was announced on 8 November 2012. Best was offered the role after he was paired up with Perkins at a workshop held by the producers of EastEnders. Executive producer, Lorraine Newman described Dexter as a "force of nature". Dexter comes to Walford and gets a job as a mechanic at The Arches, and befriends Jay Brown (Jamie Borthwick) and Lola Pearce (Danielle Harold). His significant storylines include his struggle to accept his estranged father, Sam James (Cornell John) and his losing Phil Mitchell's (Steve McFadden) £10,000. More recently, Dexter has been taking an interest in Nancy Carter (Maddy Hill).

== Steve Lowe ==
Steve Lowe
- EastEnders character
- Portrayed by: Michael Simkins
- First appearance: Episode 4585; 11 February 2013
- Last appearance: Episode 4622; 15 April 2013
- Introduced by: Lorraine Newman
In-universe information
- Occupation: Probation officer
- Daughters: Emily

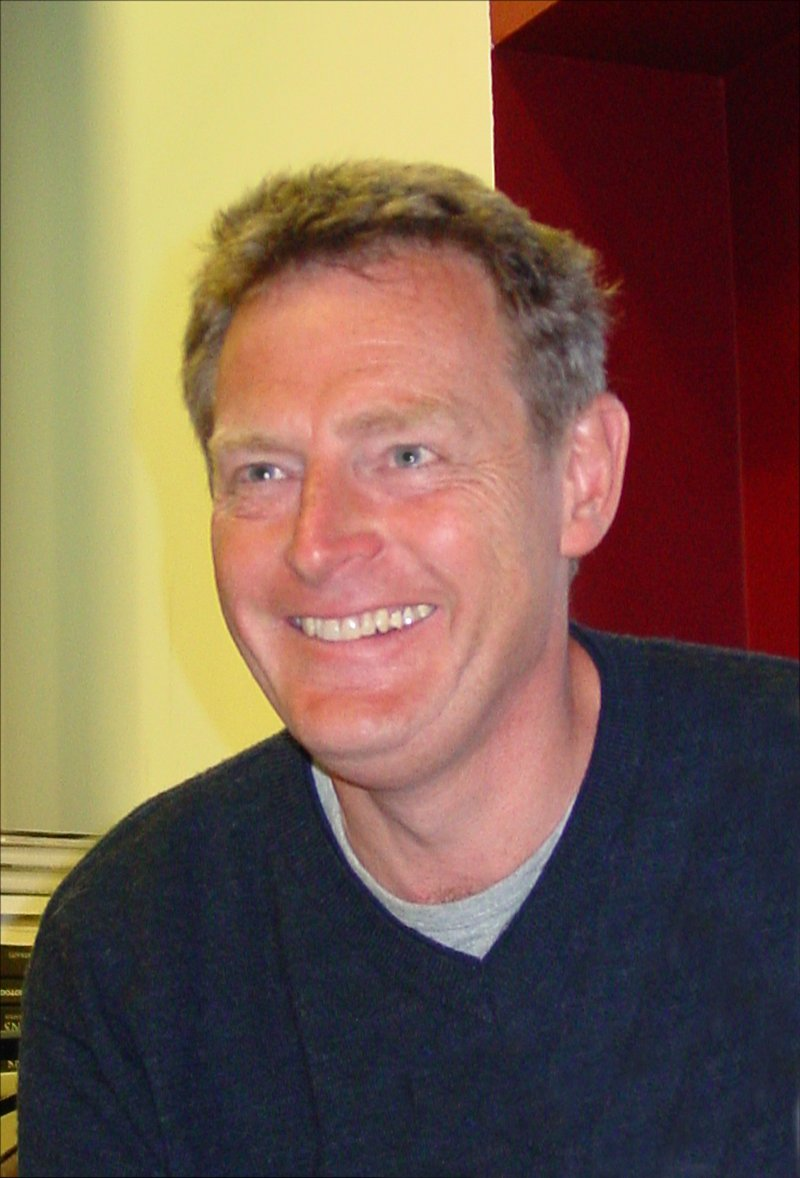
Steve Lowe is portrayed by Michael Simkins.

Steve Lowe, played by Michael Simkins, first appears in episode 4585, first broadcast on 11 February. He is introduced as Bianca Jackson's (Patsy Palmer) probation officer. He makes his last appearance in episode 4622, first broadcast on 15 April.

Steve first appears when he visits Bianca at her home. He later meets Bianca in the café and takes a liking to her mother Carol Jackson (Lindsey Coulson). He arranges to meet Carol, and stops being Bianca's probation officer. He tells Carol that when he heard that her son Billie Jackson (Devon Anderson) had died, he felt they had a connection, as his daughter Emily died in 1998, two days before her 10th birthday. They meet again the next day. A few weeks later, Bianca sees Steve on heading for her house, and thinks it has something to do with her son Liam Butcher (James Forde), but is shocked to find them on a date. Bianca is angry and wants Carol to end the relationship, because Steve could see something and report to Bianca's new probation officer. Carol tells Bianca that she has ended her relationship with Steve but he approaches Bianca in the market and she realises that Carol lied. Carol tells her friend Masood Ahmed (Nitin Ganatra), who tells Steve about Carol's difficult position. Steve assumes Carol has sent Masood to tell him their relationship is over and is angry with her.

Kate White from Inside Soap wrote on Steve's storyline: "Carol certainly can't be blamed for taking a liking to Steve. Not only is he a nice, eligible fella who's clearly interested in her, but they share a deep bond through having both experienced the agony of losing a child."

== Kane, Little Chris, Renzo, Ali and Tayo ==
Kane, Little Chris, Renzo, Ali and Tayo
- EastEnders character
- Portrayed by: Harry Rafferty, Rizwan Shebani, Chase Willoughby, Leanne Dunstan and Youssef Berouain
- First appearance: Episode 4601; 8 March 2013
- Last appearance: Episode 4613; 29 March 2013 (all but Kane); Episode 4629; 26 April 2013 (Kane)
- Introduced by: Lorraine Newman
In-universe information
- Father: Mick Kane (Kane's)

Kane (Harry Rafferty), Little Chris (Rizwan Shebani), Renzo (Chase Willoughby), Ali (Leanne Dunstan) and Tayo (Youssef Berouain) are members of a gang, of which Kane is the leader. The gang make their first appearance in the soap on 8 March 2013, and the storyline is the focus of a six-minute episode broadcast during Red Nose Day 2013 on 15 March. The gang's last appearance as a whole is on 29 March, but Kane appears again on 25 and 26 April. In the episode broadcast on 29 March 2013, a character refers to Kane as "Delton Kane".

The gang first appear running from the tube station, having evaded their fare. They are chased by a ticket inspector, and Liam Butcher (James Forde), who already knows them, helps them to hide. They later meet Liam and invite him to join, giving him cash and saying he will make more money than at his job. They later create a mess in the market, and market inspector Tamwar Masood (Himesh Patel) stands up to them, so they leave. They later mug him, taking his money belt, and Kane goes to Liam's house, giving him some money and thanking him for letting them know about Tamwar's money belt. Liam's mother Bianca Jackson (Patsy Palmer) finds the money belt in Liam's bedroom and is then told that Liam has been associating with a gang. Kat Moon (Jessie Wallace) tells Bianca that the police think the mugging was done by a known gang from an estate where a shooting took place recently. Bianca goes there when Liam does not come home, and sees him messing around with the gang. She confronts them, saying they bullied Liam into joining the gang and she knows about the mugging. She tells Liam to come home, saying he could end up dead. Renzo states that Liam is having dinner with him and his mother that night, but Bianca refuses to believe it. Kane threatens Bianca, eventually pushing her to the ground, which displeases Renzo, who checks if Bianca is okay. Some of the other gang members then take Liam away, while Renzo calmly warns Bianca about the area before disappearing. Liam comes home the next day and the gang arrive later on. Bianca finds them, and tries to make them stay away, while Liam has to be physically restrained by Ray Dixon (Charles Venn) and locked in his bedroom to stop him seeing the gang. After he is let out, he returns to the gang, and they tell him to prove his loyalty to them, by walking a dangerous wall, smashing a car window, stealing alcohol and stealing money from his colleague Shirley Carter (Linda Henry). The gang then congratulate Liam for passing, by holding a party in his honour. Liam tries to leave the party after being warned off by a girl he knows, but the gang stop him leaving so he hides in the bathroom. As Kane confronts Liam, the police arrive and the entire gang, including Liam, are arrested. They are all released without charge, but the gang blame Liam. When Bianca arrives and sees them all together, Little Chris stabs Liam and they run away. Ava and Dexter then discover the gang have trashed their flat. The gang members are arrested again but as they deny any involvement in the stabbing, they are released on bail.

Liam receives death threats from the gang via text message. Liam's younger sister Tiffany Butcher (Maisie Smith) receives an MP3 player from Ali, so Liam tells Bianca and shows her the text message. Tiffany identifies Ali to the police, who then start to patrol the streets outside the school and the Butchers' home. The next day, a brick is thrown through the kitchen window. Liam decides to stay at home while everyone else is out, locking all the doors and unplugging the phone, but then finds Kane sitting at the kitchen table. Kane tells Liam that he can rejoin the gang if he will go to the police and withdraw his statement. Liam agrees until Kane threatens Tiffany, and Liam runs to escape. He unlocks the door but Kane grabs him. Bianca then arrives and attacks Kane, and Kane is arrested.

=== Development ===
It was reported on 4 February 2013 that EastEnders was working with the charity Comic Relief on a storyline "to highlight the growing problem of teen involvement in gangs" and that Liam Butcher (James Forde) would become involved with the gang, leaving his mother Bianca frantic with worry. It is the second time the soap has worked with the charity, following 2011's storyline of Whitney Dean's (Shona McGarty) sexual exploitation. EastEnders' executive producer said, "We are delighted to be working with Comic Relief once again. This subject matter is something which is touching the lives of so many young people in London and other cities around the UK. We have taken the opportunity to see the impact from a mother's perspective, and Patsy Palmer gives a powerful performance of a mother doing all she can to protect her son. The telling of this story has also given us the chance to explore the reasons behind the attraction of gangs for teenagers." Additionally, Judith McNeill of Comic Relief said the storyline should be equally important as Whitney's in helping people to understand why young people are vulnerable to becoming involved in gangs.

== Norman Pike ==
Norman Pike
- EastEnders character
- Portrayed by: Timothy Bentinck
- First appearance: Episode 4627; 23 April 2013
- Last appearance: Episode 4655; 11 June 2013
- Introduced by: Lorraine Newman
In-universe information
- Occupation: Solicitor

Norman Pike, played by Timothy Bentinck, is a solicitor who appears in two episodes on 23 and 29 April 2013, and again on 11 June. Michael Moon (Steve John Shepherd) asks Norman for advice when his estranged wife Janine Butcher (Charlie Brooks) returns and says she wants full custody of their daughter Scarlett Moon and wants to divorce her. Norman advises mediation as a court case could be expensive and emotionally draining. He then attends a meeting between Michael and Janine, with Simone Turnbell (Kate Loustau) as Janine's solicitor. When Janine denies Michael access to Scarlett and takes her away from Walford, Michael goes to the police, who advise him to speak to his solicitor. Michael angrily telephones Norman, and when they meet, Norman tells Michael he can apply for a court order, but Scarlett has not been abducted because they have not left the country.

Bentinck posted on Twitter that he was filming his first scenes on 28 February 2013. After his scenes aired, a Manchester solicitor received an increase in calls requesting information about mediation, and welcomed the storyline, saying, "I watched the episode of EastEnders when it aired on Tuesday and was really pleased to see that such a high profile show was featuring [mediation]. When couples come to divorce, being offered mediation as an option can make a huge difference to their short and long-term future, especially if children are concerned, as in this storyline. We have seen numerous calls on Wednesday asking about mediation, which can only be a positive thing, especially in the light of the recent cuts to legal aid."

== Josef ==
Josef
- EastEnders character
- Portrayed by: Aleksandar Mikic
- First appearance: Episode 4634; 6 May 2013
- Last appearance: Episode 4636; 9 May 2013
- Introduced by: Lorraine Newman
In-universe information
- Occupation: Builder

Josef, played by Aleksandar Mikic, appears in three episodes from 6 to 9 May 2013. Josef is a builder hired by Ian Beale (Adam Woodyatt) to work on a restaurant that Ian plans to open. Ian is annoyed that Josef hangs a sign up badly, and when Josef falls and cuts him arm, Ian tells him to go to the hospital and return tomorrow, saying he will not be paid for the rest of the day. Josef instead goes to The Queen Victoria public house, where he speaks to Roxy Mitchell (Rita Simons) about his family. Ian sees Josef and tells him he will get a written warning the next day. The next day, Ian sacks Josef because he is on a break instead of getting cement. Josef gets drunk at the pub and when Roxy leaves the till open, Kat Moon (Jessie Wallace) stops him from taking money and Roxy bars him. Kat later sees Josef enter the pub, and Roxy is shocked to see Josef upstairs. He wants cash from the safe, which Roxy closes. Kat arrives and Josef grabs Roxy. Kat tells Josef he is not thinking straight because he is drunk, and he would not be invited to his daughter's wedding if she found out. Roxy's daughter Amy Mitchell (Amelie Conway) comes in, and Josef lets Roxy go and apologises before leaving.

Heat called Josef "shifty" and said he is the one person in Walford they would not "want barging into [their] lounge uninvited".

== Sam James ==
Sam James
- EastEnders character
- Portrayed by: Cornell John
- First appearance: Episode 4639; 14 May 2013
- Last appearance: Episode 4763; 16 December 2013
- Introduced by: Lorraine Newman
In-universe information
- Occupation: Builder
- Wife: Ava Hartman (backstory)
- Sons: Dexter Hartman

Sam James, played by Cornell John, is the former husband of Ava Hartman (Clare Perkins) and estranged father of her son Dexter Hartman (Khali Best). He made his first appearance on 14 May 2013. He departed on 16 December 2013.

Sam visits Ava unexpectedly when she is expecting Billy Mitchell (Perry Fenwick), with whom she has a date. Ava is shocked to see Sam and he asks if a voice he hears is his son, Dexter. Ava tells Sam to wait outside while she sends Dexter out, then invites Sam in. He explains his father, who abandoned him as a child, has died and he wants to reunite with Dexter, who he abandoned when he was three months old. Ava is angry but Sam blames her, saying she was not intimate with him after Dexter was born. Dexter comes back and Sam introduces himself as Jacob, an old friend of Ava's. Dexter likes "Jacob", thinking he is better suited to Ava than Billy. When Sam leaves, Ava tells him to never return. Sam stays overnight at the local bed and breakfast where proprietor Kim Fox (Tameka Empson) takes a liking to him. Sam helps Ian Beale (Adam Woodyatt) with a plumbing problem at his new restaurant and Dexter invites Sam to go for a drink with him. Sam is about to leave, when Ava arrives and angrily tells Sam to leave. Ava's mother Cora Cross (Ann Mitchell) calls Sam by his real name and Dexter realises that he is his father, and is angry at Ava for lying to him. Ava and Dexter continue to reject Sam, until eventually Ava realises she is still in love with Sam and they have sex. Dexter is angry to discover this and tells his mother to choose between them. She chooses Dexter and Sam prepares to leave, but when Dexter sees Ava crying, he reluctantly allows Sam to stay. It emerges that Sam requires a kidney transplant. Ava hopes to donate one of hers but is not a match. Dexter decides to take a test to see if he is a match but Ava refuses to let him. He does so anyway and he is a match, but Sam refuses to let him donate. Dexter persuades his father to accept his kidney and they go through the transplant operation. Ava fusses over both of them while they are recovering, and while Dexter is used to Ava's overprotective nature, Sam feels smothered and considers leaving. On Dexter's birthday, Sam invites Dexter's nurse, Laura (Nathalie Buscombe), who tells Ava how long Sam was waiting for a kidney. Ava then finds a letter confirming that Sam has been on a waiting list since before he returned. Ava confronts Sam, realising that he only returned for Dexter's kidney and tells him to leave. He does but tells Dexter that he is coming back after the weekend. Ava tells him he is not returning but refuses to tell him the truth. This begins to anger Dexter and cause him to insult Ava constantly. Eventually Dexter manages to locate Sam and tells him that he wants to live with him and start afresh. Sam tries to persuade Dexter to go back to Walford and live with Ava but Dexter refuses due to Ava not telling him the truth about the real reason on Sam's departure. Sam assures Dexter that Ava did nothing wrong and confesses that he only came to Walford for a kidney transplant due to failing health and Ava found out when she discovered Sam's letter from a hospital. Once Dexter learns the truth about Sam and realising why Ava ejected Sam from her home, he punches Sam and tells him he does not deserve Ava. As he leaves, Sam profusely apologizes to Dexter but he rejects Sam's apology. He then tells Sam that he is no father to him and mentions he never wants to see Sam again. This leaves Sam heartbroken and Dexter scowls at him for the last time before leaving him to go back home to Ava.

=== Development and reception ===
The character and John's casting were announced by Susan Hill from the Daily Star on 14 April 2013. Hill stated that Sam's arrival is an attempt made by producers to "shake up" the show. She revealed how Sam once walked out on his wife Ava and their infant son Dexter: he went to buy some milk and did not return. Sam decides to seek out his family following his father's death. He is an unwelcome arrival as Ava and Dexter direct their anger towards him. Sam is described as a "master manipulator and charmer". EastEnders producer Lorraine Newman said: "We are delighted to have Cornell join the cast. His powerful presence and natural gravitas will ensure he's a strong presence. The addition of Sam gives us a solid family unit." In September 2013 it was announced that Sam would be leaving at the end of his storyline.

Victoria Garo-Falides, writing for the Daily Mirror, said of Sam's kidney transplant storyline: "Sam's got a bad case of PMT and it's all because his kidney's kaput and he needs a new one. Ava's not a match, but would you Adam and Ava it? Dexter's only gone and got the one he needs. Cue lots of shouty, budget-Morgan-Freeman-style acting from Sam and Ava about butchering their son. But bearing in mind we've warmed to Sam as much as we have a bout of haemorrhoids, does anyone actually care what happens to him or the family? Not so much."

== Albert ==
Albert, played by Huw Parmenter, appears on 18 June. He is a French curate who arrives in Walford with Reverend Stevens (Michael Keating). Dot Cotton (June Brown) asks her step-granddaughter Abi Branning (Lorna Fitzgerald) to show Albert around. Gary Gillatt from Inside Soap wrote of Albert: "We were entirely mystified as to the purpose of Albert (pronounced "Al-bear") the French curate in Walford this week. "Ze poverty! Ze vermin! Ze underworld!" he enthused to Abi—so he's clearly a fan of EastEnders. But what was he for?"

== Carl White ==
Carl White, played by Daniel Coonan, is the ex-boyfriend of Kirsty Branning (Kierston Wareing). He made his first appearance on 20 June 2013. The character was axed in September 2013, and he made his last appearance on 1 January 2014, when he was murdered by Ronnie Mitchell (Samantha Womack).

The character and Coonan's casting were announced on 6 May 2013, when it was revealed that Carl has been in prison, where he had previously shared a cell with Derek Branning (Jamie Foreman). Coonan said of his casting: "EastEnders has been a part of my life since I was 12 years old. I even remember talking about the storylines in school playgrounds in Tottenham and I am very happy and proud to now be a small part of its life." Executive producer Lorraine Newman said: "It's wonderful to have Daniel Coonan joining us in Walford to play Carl White." This is Coonan's second role in EastEnders, as he played David Priors in 2011.

== Betty Spragg ==
Betty Spragg
- EastEnders character
- Portrayed by: Tessa Wyatt
- First appearance: Episode 4669; 5 July 2013
- Last appearance: Episode 4674; 15 July 2013
- Introduced by: Lorraine Newman

Betty Spragg, played by Tessa Wyatt, first appeared on 5 July 2013. Having previously been asked by Patrick Trueman (Rudolph Walker) to be his dance partner, Cora Cross (Ann Mitchell) arrives at his house to discover she is too late as Patrick has found Betty to be his dance partner. Betty further infuriates Cora by baking cakes for Patrick and giving him attention. Cora calls Betty "ridiculous" behind her back. When Patrick and Betty dance together again, he realises he would prefer someone more exciting, but is unable to let Betty down, agreeing to dance again the next day. However Patrick soon ends his friendship with Betty, and resumes his relationship with Cora.

Wyatt's casting was announced on 13 June 2013, when it was revealed that Betty is a dance partner and companion of Patrick who will reportedly clash with Cora, forcing Patrick to choose between the two women. Betty, a Women's Institute member, is a guest character, but Wyatt said she would not turn down the opportunity to extend the role.

== Ollie Walters ==
Ollie Walters
- EastEnders character
- Portrayed by: Tony O'Callaghan
- Duration: 2013–2016, 2018
- First appearance: Episode 4672; 11 July 2013
- Last appearance: Episode 5732; 29 June 2018
- Introduced by: Lorraine Newman (2013); Dominic Treadwell-Collins (2014); John Yorke (2018)
In-universe information
- Occupation: Retired police officer
- Wife: Jean Slater (2015–2018)

Ollie Walters, played by Tony O'Callaghan, is a recurring character who appears in four separate stints, from 11 July to 17 September 2013, 7 August 2014, 6 and 7 July, 17 and 18 December 2015, 19 to 21 January 2016, and finally on 14 April 2016. On 10 June 2018, it was announced that Ollie would return later in the year. He made an appearance in two episodes broadcast on 29 June.

Ollie first appears at the local allotments and overhears Jean Slater (Gillian Wright) talking about what vegetables she hopes to grow. He introduces himself to her and gives her advice, saying he will keep an eye on her. The next time they meet, he upsets her because she is overwhelmed by his constant talking. He apologises via a note on a fork. They meet again at a speed dating event, and she agrees to see him again. They go on a date but she worries when he says he is a police officer, because she has broken the law. He says he does not care about that and they kiss. Later, she worries he will be put off by the fact she has bipolar disorder, so does not tell him. She does tell him eventually because he thinks she is acting strangely, but she walks away before he can speak. He researches the condition and tells Jean he wants to continue to see her. However, when she cleans instead of getting ready to go out, he says they can go out another night and she thinks he is scared of her bipolar and thinks their relationship is over.

He returns a few days later and tells Jean's in-law Kat Slater (Jessie Wallace) that he made a mistake, but she warns him to stay away. When Jean's friend Shirley Carter (Linda Henry) prepares to leave, she urges Jean to make up with Ollie. Jean discovers that Ollie has given up his patch at the allotments. She discovers he is retiring to Brighton but is having a party first, so she decides to go, but leaves without seeing Ollie when his friend Frank (Patrick Driver) makes fun of mental illness. The next day, she misses Ollie and is surprised when he arrives to say goodbye. He admits that he loves her and she agrees to come to Brighton with him, but Kat convinces Jean to stay. However, when Kat realises that Jean loves Ollie, she enlists Alfie Moon's (Shane Richie) help to find him, but they fear they are too late. Ollie finds Jean at the allotments, saying he has cancelled his move so he can stay with her, but she says he cannot stay just for her. They declare their love for one another, and leave for Brighton together with Kat's blessing.

When Jean's daughter Stacey Slater (Lacey Turner), confesses to killing Archie Mitchell (Larry Lamb), and is sentenced to five years in prison, her daughter Lily Slater (Aine Garvey) goes to live with Jean and Ollie. Five months later, Jean and Lily arrive at Kat and Alfie's house, and Jean says she and Ollie have split up. Jean attempts suicide, after which Ollie visits her in hospital and says they have not split up and is upset that Jean did not talk to him about her problems. One year later, Jean returns to Walford and reveals to Stacey that Ollie has proposed to her and that they are getting married. Ollie arrives in Walford the next day, but Jean is upset so Ollie immediately takes her back to Brighton. Ollie and Jean then get married.

When Jean and Ollie visit Walford in December, Stacey tells Jean she is being followed. Ollie reveals someone visited Jean back in Brighton and when Stacey asks Jean who he is, only then it emerges that Stacey's father, Brian, secretly had another family, and Stacey discovers the man following her is actually her half brother Kyle Slater (Riley Carter Millington). Ollie is shocked as to why Jean did not tell him, and Jean says that she wanted to forget it and to start afresh. Jean and Ollie return later to meet Stacey's newborn son Arthur Fowler. Stacey is hospitalised after suffering with postpartum psychosis so Jean and Ollie stay in a hotel nearby in case Stacey needs them. They then return to Brighton.

In December 2017, Stacey leaves Walford with her children to stay with Jean and Ollie for a few weeks, after admitting to cheating on Martin with Max Branning (Jake Wood). When Jean returns to Walford in March 2018, Kat asks why Jean is avoiding returning home. Jean admits that Ollie has hurt her. Kat and Stacey invite Ollie to Walford but he denies hitting her. Jean says that Ollie kissed a woman, Elsie, which is why she left, but she still loves Ollie and wants to go home with him, however, Ollie accidentally calls her by Elsie's name so she realises he has been having an affair. Jean then asks Ollie to leave after returning her wedding ring, and she later files for a divorce.

The character and O'Callaghan's casting were announced on 13 June 2013, when it was revealed that Ollie is a gardening enthusiast and a love interest for Jean after she gets her own allotment. O'Callaghan said of his casting, "I am very excited to be joining a show with as much prestige as EastEnders and I'm looking forward to portraying the nice side and humour of Ollie." Since leaving the series in September 2013, O'Callaghan and Wright have returned to the show for three guest stints. Jean returned in August 2014, with Ollie appearing once on 7 August. She returned again in July 2015 when Jean and Ollie married. This saw Ollie appear on 6 and 7 July 2015. Jean returned to the show in December 2015, with Ollie appearing on 17 and 18 December. Jean returned again in March 2018 and on 10 June 2018 it was confirmed that O'Callaghan would reprise the role once again for a "brief return".

== Nora White ==
Nora White
- EastEnders character
- Portrayed by: Lynn Farleigh
- Duration: 2013–2014
- First appearance: Episode 4679; 23 July 2013
- Last appearance: Episode 4821; 17 March 2014
- Introduced by: Lorraine Newman (2013); Dominic Treadwell-Collins (2014)
In-universe information
- Sons: Carl White; Adam White

Nora White, played Lynn Farleigh, is the mother of Carl (Daniel Coonan) and Adam White (Ben Wigzell). She appears on 23 July 2013, when Carl and his ex-girlfriend Kirsty Branning (Kierston Wareing) decide to visit her in her nursing home for her birthday. Nora does not know they have split up, and she says she is pleased they are still together. While Carl gets some tea, Nora tells Kirsty she hopes for a grandchild from them, but while Kirsty gets a vase for her flowers, Nora takes Carl's hand and digs her nails in, threatening to kill him if he hurts Kirsty, comparing him to his "pathetic" father. Carl and Kirsty leave, and Kirsty can tell Carl is troubled, but does not see the cuts on his hand.

Nora returns to Walford in March 2014. Carl has not been in contact with her for over three months. A meeting with Roxy Mitchell (Rita Simons), Carl's girlfriend, is arranged but Roxy's sister Ronnie (Samantha Womack) tricks her into believing that she is Roxy. Carl's brother, Adam (Ben Wigzell) joins her in Walford, and shows her a picture of Roxy, making Nora realise that she had been lied to. Adam kidnaps Lexi Pearce, which Nora is unhappy about. They arrange to meet Ronnie, who brings Lexi's grandfather Phil Mitchell (Steve McFadden) as back up. Nora demands to know what happened to Carl in return for Lexi but Phil manages to convince Adam to give Lexi back to them. Nora begs the Mitchells for answers causing Ronnie to break down and admit that she killed him, leaving a distraught Nora and Adam shocked. Ronnie later has Adam beaten up by Aleks Shirovs (Kristian Kiehling) and she and Phil visit Adam in hospital whilst Nora sits by his bedside. Ronnie warns the Whites to leave them alone, threatening them with more violence if they do not. She and Phil then leave. Nora has not been seen since.

Inside Soap called Nora "pure, unbridled evil", saying she may be the reason Carl is such a menace. They explained that there is tension between Carl and Nora, and Nora is charming to Carl's ex-girlfriend Kirsty Branning (Kierston Wareing) but when Kirsty is out of the room, "Nora shows her true colours", digging her fingernails into Carl's hand while urging Carl not to lose Kirsty, unaware they are no longer a couple. The magazine compared this behaviour to Carl's burning Ian Beale's (Adam Woodyatt) hand, speculating that he "learnt everything from his evil mum". David Brown from Radio Times suggested bringing Nora back, saying she "was ten times more intimidating [than Carl] and she was only in one episode. [...] Get Carl and his old ma to join forces—then we'd be getting somewhere." Coonan said that Nora is "dominating and horrible" and shows that Carl has "demons within his own family" and a "troubled background". Nora reappeared on 10 March 2014, along with Adam to find the truth about Carl's death.

== Sadie Young ==
Sadie Young, played by Kate Magowan, made her first appearance on 5 August 2013. The character and Magowan's casting were announced on 12 July 2013, when it was said that Sadie is "bound to bring some class to Albert Square". It was said that the character would be "shrouded in mystery" initially. Magowan said of her casting, "I'm thrilled to be joining EastEnders and look forward to seeing what the character of Sadie will get up to in Walford." Magowan was only brought in for the storyline with Lauren and Jake, and it was confirmed in October 2013 that she would leave the show permanently . Inside Soap said Sadie was a "welcome addition" to the cast, calling her a "breath of fresh air", "smart", "sexy", "mysterious" and "intriguing".

== Jake Stone ==
Jake Stone
- EastEnders character
- Portrayed by: Jamie Lomas
- Duration: 2013–2015
- First appearance: Episode 4692; 15 August 2013
- Last appearance: Episode 5019; 19 February 2015
- Introduced by: Lorraine Newman (2013); Dominic Treadwell-Collins (2015)
In-universe information
- Occupation: Businessman sous chef minicab driver
- Wife: Sadie Young (until 2014)
- Daughters: Bella Young

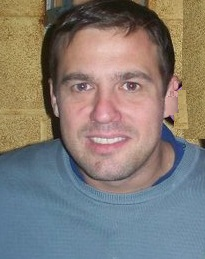
Jamie Lomas, who plays Jake Stone

Jake Stone is played by Jamie Lomas and made his first appearance on 15 August 2013, when he meets Lauren Branning (Jacqueline Jossa) who is attending counselling for alcoholism for the first time. She notices his wedding ring. He is angered when she laughs in a group therapy session. Afterwards he tells her that he was a chef and ran two restaurants in Manchester before alcohol ruined his career and marriage, though he and his wife are trying to mend their relationship. The next time they meet, Jake says he has split from his wife, Sadie Young (Kate Magowan). Lauren starts leaning on Jake for support, because he understands her addiction when her family and friends do not. Jake and Lauren have an affair. Whilst arguing with Sadie, it is revealed that years before he and Sadie accidentally hit a girl with their car and killed her while they were arguing many years before. Jake gets a job at Ian Beale's (Adam Woodyatt) restaurant, Scarlett's, and continues his affair with Lauren behind Sadie's back. When Sadie discovers their affair, she leaves Walford with Bella. Unknown to Jane Beale (Laurie Brett), Jake is later discovered by her in their restaurant. Ian invites him to sleep on his sofa, and asks Alfie Moon (Shane Richie) if he would give Jake a job at his burger van. Alfie agrees, and Jake and Aleks Shirovs (Kristian Kiehling) rent a flat.

The burger van is later taken away, leaving Jake unemployed again. He seeks employment at the café, and also designs Lucy Beale (Hetti Bywater) a website for her new business, causing slight upset with her partner, Lauren. It is hinted that both Jake and Lucy are having a fling as both of them are seen constantly checking their phone and having occasional small talk. It is also implied when Lucy is in a rush to meet her mystery man for a date and Jake was preparing a meal whilst looking out his window, but this is disproved when it is revealed, in a conversation with Aleks, that he has actually been getting in contact with Sadie who refused to attend his meal last minute, as she has not forgiven him. He now works in Ian and Jane's new restaurant, where he sees Lee Carter (Danny-Boy Hatchard) and Lucy having a heart to heart moment. Jake is constantly seen watching both Lucy and Lauren around the square when they pass him, causing Aleks to jokingly taunt him claiming Jake has an obsession with them. Lucy is later killed in mysterious circumstances and when Lauren investigates her death, she discovers the police have already questioned Jake. It is revealed that Jake, under a different guise, sent an email to LB Lettings asking to meet Lauren, which was later read by Lucy. Lucy met with an intoxicated Jake on Walford Common, with Jake claiming that she sent him home in a taxi and he did not see her again. Lauren does not believe his claims, however, and thinks that he killed Lucy. He tries to convince her he is telling the truth but becomes forceful with her. After their confrontation, Lauren visits the police. Jake is later arrested after Lucy's blood and one of her earrings is found in his flat.

Jake is remanded in custody, and a date set for his trial. However, three months later, he is released on bail after new evidence emerges. Jake returns to Tina and Tosh's apartment where Lauren visits him and apologises for accusing of him of murder. He tells her he is leaving for good, so he can be a father to Bella. In February 2015, he returns in a flashback episode of the night Lucy died to rule him out as her murderer. It was revealed the night Lucy died that she took him home by taxi, where she met Max and they helped him get into his flat. During which he unintentionally hit her causing a nose bleed. Max is later identified by the taxi driver, which in part results in him being found guilty and sent to prison.

He is described as "sexy, charming and seductive", and is a recovering alcoholic who is unable to resist temptation. He is good looking and charming, but keeps his secrets to himself. The character and casting were announced on 20 June 2013. Lomas said, "I'm over the moon to be joining the cast of EastEnders. I have admired the show for many years and I can't wait to start working with such a strong cast of actors. Jake Stone is a great character to play and I'm really looking forward to getting my teeth stuck into the role." Executive producer Lorraine Newman said, "We're delighted to welcome Jamie to the world of Walford. I have no doubt he'll make a big impact on screen as Jake Stone. The show's about to enter a really exciting period which Jamie will be a huge part of, with a great storyline allowing him to truly shine." Lomas started filming for his role in June 2013. In March 2014, it was announced Jake was axed and would leave at the end of Lomas's contract in July 2014.

== Naomi ==
Naomi
- EastEnders character
- Portrayed by: Lisa Maxwell
- Appears in: Episode 4719; 27 September 2013
- Introduced by: Lorraine Newman
In-universe information
- Husband: Don

Naomi is played by Lisa Maxwell and appears as the girlfriend of David Wicks (Michael French) in one episode on 27 September 2013. Naomi appears at Carol Jackson's (Lindsey Coulson) door because she has been waiting outside for David. It emerges that Naomi is cheating on her husband Don (Simon Thorp) with David and they have stolen his money and are planning to go away to Spain. David and Naomi talk in Carol's kitchen, where she discovers that David has taken £20,000 of the money to give to his daughter Bianca (Patsy Palmer). Naomi dislikes this and the pair argue, with David saying they are just using each other. When David goes upstairs to speak to Carol, Naomi calls Don, who then arrives. Naomi gives Don back his money and tells him that David still has some of it. Don's associates, Leo (Andy Pilgrim) and Mick (James Cox), punch David and take the money. David follows as they leave the house and begs for the money, so they beat him as Carol watches on, and leave.

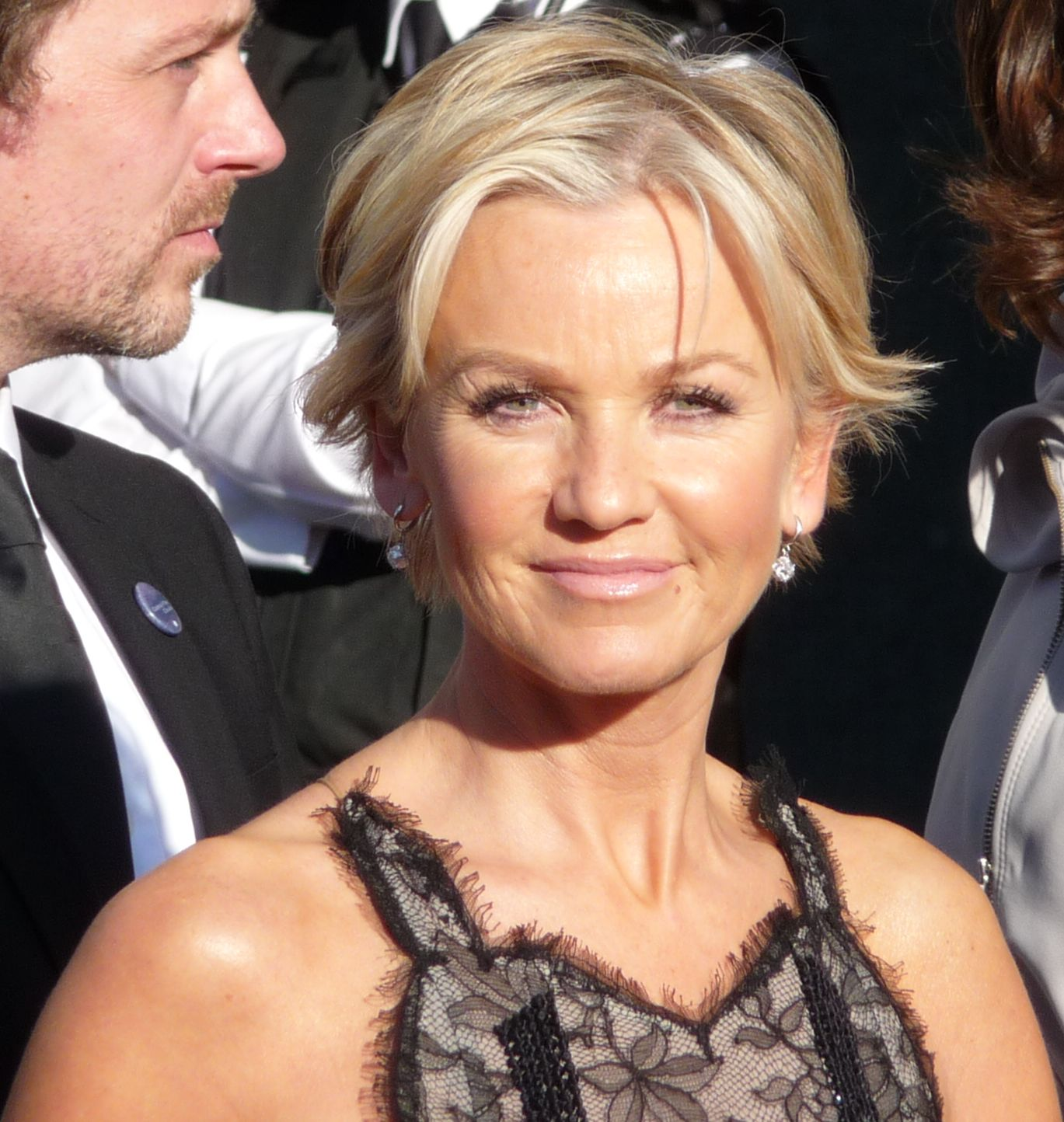
Lisa Maxwell, who plays Naomi

Maxwell's appearance in the show was announced on 2 August 2013, when a statement said, "Viewers won't be surprised to see the lothario with a woman in tow, however things aren't quite what they seem when the past quickly catches up with them." Maxwell said of her casting, "I've had a fantastic time filming at EastEnders and working with the wonderful Michael [French], Lindsey [Coulson] and Nitin [Ganatra, Masood Ahmed] has been an absolute joy. I can honestly say it's one of the happiest jobs I've done. Michael French is an amazing actor and to be part of such an iconic character's return to the Square felt very special." Maxwell revealed in an interview with Radio Times that she filmed her scenes over a period of "about a week", but she lost her voice on her first day of rehearsals, and said by the time she started filming, "I barely had any voice. I don't know if anybody could tell, but I knew, because I had to breathe properly and make sure that my voice was there. It was a concern for me at one point!" She called the character "fun", and explained Naomi's story: "David Wicks has been in Spain, where Naomi lives with her husband, Don. David and Don are what you would loosely term 'business associates'. Her husband's a bit dodgy and he probably had a few bad goings on in the past. Naomi and Don are back and forth between Spain and Essex, having businesses in both places. But David and Naomi are having an affair and they've decided to nick Don's money and do a runner. But on the way he decides he wants to stop off and see Bianca and bung her a few quid, which is how they find themselves in Albert Square." She explained that she thinks Naomi does love David, but called her "quite a manipulative character", adding that "She's tough, she likes the nice things in life and I imagine that she couldn't be happy without money! And in that sense she's been thoroughly spoilt by Don. So I think she does love David, but only the condition that he's got a few quid. As long as David can provide for her then I think she'd stay with him." Maxwell went on to say that Naomi could return to the series, saying, "She's in love with David Wicks and they've been having an affair for quite some time, from what I gather, so there's unfinished business there. [...] If the experience working on EastEnders is anything like the one I had doing that episode, then in a heartbeat I'd go back."

== Bella Young ==
Bella Young
- EastEnders character
- Portrayed by: Isobelle Molloy
- Duration: 2013–2014
- First appearance: Episode 4730; 17 October 2013
- Last appearance: Episode 4789; 20 January 2014
- Introduced by: Lorraine Newman
In-universe information
- Occupation: Student
- Father: Jake Stone
- Mother: Bella Young

Bella Young (also Stone), played by Isobelle Molloy, is the daughter of Sadie Young (Kate Magowan) and Jake Stone (Jamie Lomas). Molloy's casting was announced on 3 October 2013 and Digital Spy confirmed that her first scenes had been filmed.

Bella is first seen when her mother drops her off at school. At Halloween, Cindy Williams (Mimi Keene) looks after Bella while Sadie goes to a party in The Queen Victoria public house. Bella then moves to Albert Square with her parents in October 2013 after her mother bought the salon off of Tanya Branning (Jo Joyner). In January 2014, after finishing school early, Bella discovers her father's affair with Lauren Branning (Jacqueline Jossa) after going upstairs and finding Lauren in her parents' bedroom. She later informs her mother, who despite Jake's pleas, leaves Walford taking Bella with her to stay at her mother's.

== Terry Spraggan ==
Terry Spraggan
- EastEnders character
- Portrayed by: Terry Alderton
- Duration: 2013–2015
- First appearance: Episode 4741; 5 November 2013
- Last appearance: Episode 5080; 5 June 2015
- Introduced by: Lorraine Newman (2013); Dominic Treadwell-Collins (2015)
- Spin-off appearances: "T & B 4 Eva" (2013)
In-universe information
- Occupation: Taxi driver
- Sisters: Val
- Wife: Nikki Spraggan (backstory)
- Sons: TJ Spraggan
- Daughters: Rosie Spraggan
- Granddaughters: Beth Williams

Terry Spraggan is played by comedian Terry Alderton. His first appearance is in episode 4741, first broadcast on 5 November 2013. In April 2014, it was announced that Terry would be leaving the series. He departs in episode 4924, first broadcast on 12 September 2014, although he makes a guest appearance in episode 5080, first broadcast on 5 June 2015.

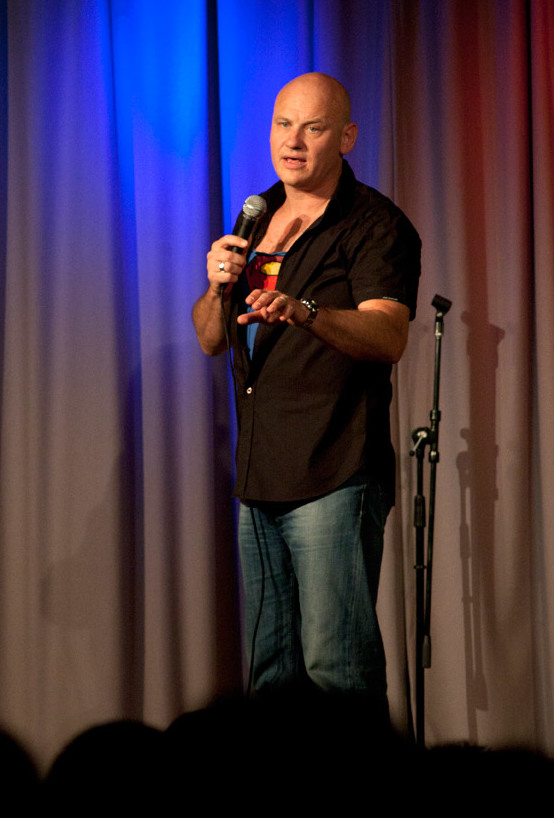
Actor and comedian Terry Alderton was cast as Terry Spraggan.

Terry arrives with Bianca Jackson (Patsy Palmer), who has returned from Manchester, and meets Bianca's parents Carol Jackson (Lindsey Coulson) and David Wicks (Michael French). Bianca then announces that Terry is moving in, along with his children, TJ (George Sargeant) and Rosie (Jerzey Swingler), because his landlord has forced him to move out. Bianca's family struggle to accept Terry, as they know nothing about him. Terry's air hostess ex-wife Nikki Spraggan (Rachel Wilde) visits Terry and his new family with presents for TJ and Rosie. This makes Bianca's children jealous, and Bianca clashes with Nikki as a result. She visits again at Christmas, but over Christmas Dinner she clashes with Bianca when she accidentally spills gravy down her front and Bianca perceives this as being deliberate. She throws Terry and his family out as a result, and, although they reunite, he decides to rent his own place, around the corner, to live in with TJ and Rosie.

Bianca helps Terry accept circumstances when Cindy becomes pregnant and reveals TJ is the father, and he clashes with Cindy's guardian, Ian Beale (Adam Woodyatt). Carol develops cancer, and it is revealed she has a cancer susceptibility mutation in her BRCA2 gene, meaning that there is a 50% chance of Bianca having the gene and being extremely likely to develop breast cancer like her mother. As a result, Bianca struggles to cope and pushes Terry away. Terry steps up to support Bianca's adopted daughter, Whitney Dean (Shona McGarty), but, in her upset state, Bianca accuses Terry of molesting her, like her ex-partner Tony King (Chris Coghill). As a result, Bianca and Terry split up.

Terry supports his friend Alfie Moon (Shane Richie) through his wife Kat's (Jessie Wallace) pregnancy. He attracts the attention of new market trader Donna Yates (Lisa Hammond), but it is clear his interests still lie with Bianca. It is later revealed that Terry and Bianca have secretly been seeing each other for two months, not telling anyone for fear of complicating things. Terry wants to tell the truth, but Bianca remains firm about keeping it a secret. TJ tells Bianca that they are moving to Milton Keynes, and she is angry with Terry as he did not tell her. He tells her he needs to move on as she obviously does not have the same feelings as he does. However, Bianca proves her commitment by telling Terry she loves him and agreeing to move to Milton Keynes with him. They take Bianca's children to see the house, and they agree to give living in Milton Keynes a go. Nine months later, Terry appears to collect his granddaughter, Beth Williams, from Ian and Jane Beale (Laurie Brett). In 2024, Bianca tells Whitney that Terry has left her.

=== Development ===
The character and Alderton's casting were announced on 23 August 2013, when it was announced he would be Bianca's new boyfriend, after meeting her off-screen in Manchester. Terry is a cab driver, described as a "typical Cockney" and a "bloke's bloke", who is "never short of an entertaining story to tell about who he's had in his cab the night before".

It was announced that Terry would leave the soap later in 2014, as part of Bianca's exit storyline, and it was later confirmed that his children, TJ and Rosie, would leaving alongside him. Alderton filmed his final scenes on 18 July 2014.

== TJ Spraggan ==
TJ Spraggan
- EastEnders character
- Portrayed by: George Sargeant
- Duration: 2013–2014, 2018
- First appearance: Episode 4741; 5 November 2013
- Last appearance: Episode 5641; 19 January 2018
- Introduced by: Lorraine Newman (2013); John Yorke (2018)
In-universe information
- Father: Terry Spraggan
- Mother: Nikki Spraggan
- Sisters: Rosie Spraggan
- Daughters: Beth Williams

TJ Spraggan, played by George Sargeant, is Terry Spraggan's (Terry Alderton) son. He makes his first appearance on 5 November 2013, and departed on 12 September 2014 after appearing in 28 episodes. Sargeant reprised the role in 2018 and the character appeared on 18 and 19 January.

TJ first appears with his sister, Rosie Spraggan (Jerzey Swingler), arriving together when their father moves to Albert Square with his new girlfriend Bianca Jackson (Patsy Palmer). TJ asks questions about a crime scene at the house next door, scaring Rosie when he tells her it was a murder. The two clash with Bianca's children, especially Liam Butcher (James Forde). TJ finds out that Liam was once in a gang, Whitney Dean (Shona McGarty) was sexually exploited and Bianca was imprisoned for assault, and is not happy about living with them, so calls his mother, Nikki Spraggan (Rachel Wilde). She arrives but TJ changes his mind about wanting to go. Eventually, Bianca and Terry agree that Nikki should have Christmas dinner at theirs, because it is what Rosie and TJ want. When a positive pregnancy test is found, TJ meets with Cindy Williams (Mimi Keene) and panics what they should do, revealing that she is pregnant with his child. Cindy initially decides to have a termination so they go to the abortion clinic, but after a disagreement, TJ leaves her there. Cindy later informs that TJ that she did not go through with the abortion and is keeping the baby. After talking to his father, TJ then tells Cindy that he is committed to raising their baby together.

TJ stays with his gran for while until Cindy, who returns from Plymouth suddenly, gives birth to his daughter, Beth. TJ struggles with the prospect of being a father so young, despite Terry's determination for him to face up to his responsibilities. He reveals to Bianca that Terry is planning to move them to Milton Keynes, and that is part of his reasoning for not wanting to get close to Beth; Bianca is initially furious, but later agrees to move there with them after reuniting with Terry. Liam is furious when he hears TJ saying that he wants nothing to do with Beth. Then before Terry and Bianca move to Milton Keynes, Liam takes TJ to see Beth one last time. TJ leaves with Bianca, Morgan Butcher (Devon Higgs), Tiffany Butcher (Maisie Smith), Rosie and Terry but Whitney and Liam stay. Nine months later, Cindy sends Beth to live with TJ and he takes over custody for her.

Over three years after leaving, Tiffany returns to Walford and informs Whitney that Bianca has attempted suicide. When Whitney tries contacting Bianca, TJ tells her that Bianca is on a cruise. TJ and Whitney arrange to meet but TJ fails to provide any answers for Tiffany's behaviour. When Tiffany realises that TJ is in Walford, she disappears; TJ acts casual about her disappearance. When she returns, Tiffany reveals that Bianca and Terry left Tiffany in TJ's care but TJ had sex with random girls in the house and threatened Tiffany so that she would not tell anyone. Whitney orders TJ to leave and keeps Tiffany in her care.

In an interview with Laura-Jayne Tyler of Inside Soap, Alderton explained that TJ struggles to deal with the tension between Terry's children and Bianca's children. On 20 July 2014, it was announced that the Spraggan family would be written out of the series following Palmer's decision to quit. The characters departed on 12 September 2014. On 18 January 2018, Sargeant made an unannounced return to the series for two episodes following Tiffany's reintroduction.

For his role as TJ, Sargeant was longlisted for "Best Young Actor" at the 2014 Inside Soap Awards.

== Rosie Spraggan ==
Rosie Spraggan
- EastEnders character
- Portrayed by: Jerzey Swingler
- Duration: 2013–2014
- First appearance: Episode 4742; 7 November 2013
- Last appearance: Episode 4924; 12 September 2014
- Introduced by: Lorraine Newman
In-universe information
- Father: Terry Spraggan
- Mother: Nikki Spraggan
- Brothers: TJ Spraggan
- Nieces: Beth Williams

Rosie Spraggan, played by Jerzey Swingler, is Terry Spraggan's (Terry Alderton) daughter. She first appears on 7 November 2013 with her brother, TJ (George Sargeant), arriving together when their father moves to Albert Square with his new girlfriend Bianca Jackson (Patsy Palmer). TJ asks questions about a crime scene at the house next door, scaring Rosie when he tells her it was a murder. The two clash with Bianca's children, especially Liam Butcher (James Forde). Bianca and Terry agree that Rosie's mother, Nikki Spraggan (Rachel Wilde) should have Christmas dinner at theirs, because it is what Rosie and TJ want.

Alderton told Inside Soap that Rosie is "just as gobby as her dad", explaining that "if there's something to be eaten, she'll eat it—something to play with, she'll play with it." Rosie left alongside Terry and TJ on 12 September 2014.

== Tina Carter ==
Tina Carter, played by Luisa Bradshaw-White, is the sister of Shirley Carter (Linda Henry), aunt of Mick Carter (Danny Dyer) and mother of Zsa Zsa Carter (Emer Kenny). She first appears on 18 November 2013. Tina was first mentioned in the 2010 spin-off series EastEnders: E20, in which Zsa Zsa was a main character. The character and Bradshaw-White's casting were announced on 19 September 2013. It was said that Tina is similar to Shirley, and is "loud, brash, cheeky and full of energy". Bradshaw-White said of her casting, "I am so excited to be joining EastEnders to play Tina as she is such a brilliant character to play. Linda is an amazing person to work with and the energy between Shirley and Tina is explosive!" The character was originally going to be "an overweight 50-year-old who's past it", but was changed for Bradshaw-White.

== Nikki Spraggan ==
Nikki Spraggan
- EastEnders character
- Portrayed by: Rachel Wilde
- Duration: 2013–2014
- First appearance: Episode 4755/4756; 2 December 2013
- Last appearance: Episode 4884; 4 July 2014
- Introduced by: Lorraine Newman
In-universe information
- Occupation: Flight attendant Check-in assistant
- Husband: Terry Spraggan (backstory)
- Sons: TJ Spraggan
- Daughters: Rosie Spraggan
- Granddaughters: Beth Williams

Nikki Spraggan, played by Rachel Wilde, is Terry Spraggan's (Terry Alderton) ex-wife, and the mother of his children TJ (George Sargeant) and Rosie Spraggan (Jerzey Swingler). She first appears on 2 December 2013. She visits Bianca Jackson's (Patsy Palmer) house after TJ telephones her, and Bianca begrudgingly invites her to lunch. However, Bianca is surprised when they bond, until Nikki reveals that Terry has lived with several women since they divorced. Nikki returns a few weeks later after TJ calls her, unhappy about living at Bianca's house. She insists that her children should live with her but TJ says he is happy to stay. Terry then says the children will stay with him for a family Christmas and Nikki invites herself. She arrives two days before Christmas with presents for TJ and Rosie, and Terry says the children can stay with Nikki for Christmas because she will be alone. On Christmas Day, Bianca tells Nikki that she wants her to let Terry go and she responds by saying that she did that three years before when they had separated. During Christmas dinner, Nikki accidentally spills gravy on Bianca and, believing Nikki did it on purpose, she throws milk over her and a food fight takes place. Bianca asks Terry, Nikki and the children to leave, which they do. However, he makes it clear that he blames her for ruining things with Bianca.

In February, Bianca's father David Wicks (Michael French) invites Nikki to the square to talk to TJ when she learns that he has got Cindy Williams (Mimi Keene) pregnant. Following a heart-to-heart with TJ and advice from David, she decides to stay in Walford for her children's sake but continues to interfere in Terry and Bianca's relationship and attempts to seduce David. He initially resists and they are almost caught by Bianca, her half-sister Sonia Fowler (Natalie Cassidy) and her mother Carol Jackson (Lindsey Coulson). Nikki learns that Carol has breast cancer but promises not to say anything. David proposes to Carol and tells Nikki to stay away from him. However, he later responds to her advances and kisses Nikki. She later leaves on a flight for Acapulco but offers David the chance to come with her but he refuses, wanting to stay loyal to Carol. Nikki returns to the Square at Easter. She is heartbroken when she is transferred to the check-in desk at work and confides in David. She attempts to kiss him again when he comforts her but he rebuffs her advances. When Nikki continues to text him, David goes to her house and finds Nikki in a towel having run a bubble bath. Nikki seductively drops her towel and allows him to see her stark naked but he still rejects her. When Bianca discovers this, she attacks Nikki in the street, pushing her into a pile of rubbish. David does this too when Nikki again tries to tempt him on his and Carol's wedding day so Nikki goes back to work. In July, she returns and tells Terry that she is homeless, and he allows her to stay with him. Terry and Nikki contemplate getting back together, although new market stallholder Donna Yates (Lisa Hammond) is attracted to Terry. Terry and Nikki arrange to meet in The Queen Victoria public house, but Terry does not show up as he is comforting Bianca and tells Nikki that he fell asleep on the sofa. Terry has second thoughts about reconciling with Nikki and when the couple have dinner that evening, Terry tells Nikki how he feels, explaining that whatever feelings they had once had for each other are gone and that they should not settle for each other. When Terry tells Nikki that he knows that she does not love him, she realises that he is right and decides to move out. Nikki packs her bags and after bidding farewell to Terry, she leaves Walford in a taxi to stay with some of her colleagues. It is later revealed that she has returned to work as a stewardess.

Alderton described Nikki, a flight attendant, as "a selfish woman" who "thinks it's okay to pop back when she feels like it and pick up where she left off [with the children]." Inside Soap said that Nikki is "the picture of immaculate grooming" when she arrives, and that she causes friction between Terry and his new girlfriend Bianca Jackson (Patsy Palmer). The magazine also called her "scheming".

== Tramp ==
Tramp
- EastEnders character
- Portrayed by: Duffie
- Duration: 2013–2015
- First appearance: Episode 4757; 3 December 2013
- Last appearance: Episode 5019; 19 February 2015
- Introduced by: Lorraine Newman
- Species: Dog

Tramp is a stray dog found by Abi Branning (Lorna Fitzgerald). He first appears on 3 December 2013. The dog wakes up several Albert Square residents in the night by barking, and in the morning, Abi tells her father Max Branning (Jake Wood) that she will deal with the dog. She immediately takes a liking to him and brings him in the house. Max wants him gone, but Abi says she has named him. Max calls him "Tramp" and when Abi's sister Lauren Branning (Jacqueline Jossa) arrives, she and Abi convince Max to let them keep the dog. He mates with the Carter family's bulldog, Lady Di, who becomes pregnant. Upset over her break-up with Jay Brown (Jamie Borthwick), a drunken Abi tries to leave Albert Square, and when Max refuses to take her she decides to drive herself, but runs over Tramp, killing him.

Tramp is played by a four-year-old rescue dog named Duffie. Duffie's owner, Chris Mancini, from Enfield Town, said: "I am so excited about seeing Duffie on EastEnders and this is the best moment of his career so far. He is in the programme for the foreseeable future and although he has done adverts in the past, this is the biggest job for him." Duffie was signed to Animal Ambassadors, and his breed is unknown. Jossa said of the new addition to the Branning family, "Tramp is really cool and very well trained. He's big, scruffy and fluffy—and so cute!" She explained that in the first scene the Brannings filmed with the dog, Wood had to shout at Tramp and tell him to get out, and Tramp was supposed to stare and not move, but said that "Tramp got up and walked out right away. It was very funny!" Tramp's final appearance is on 19 February 2015 during a flashback episode.

== Linda Carter ==
Linda Carter, played by Kellie Bright, is the partner of Mick Carter (Danny Dyer). She was introduced by executive producer Dominic Treadwell-Collins. Bright's casting was announced on 1 October 2013. From Boxing Day 2013 onwards, they became the new landlord and landlady of The Queen Victoria public house.

Mick and Linda, a former glamour model, have been together since they were children, and she is the love of his life. The BBC said of Linda, "She's the first to admit she wasn't blessed with brains, but her fluffy candyfloss exterior belies an inner steel. A lioness who will fight tooth and nail for her brood, she can be 'more smother than mother'."

== Mick Carter ==
Mick Carter, played by Danny Dyer, is the son of Shirley Carter (Linda Henry), the brother of Dean Wicks (Matt Di Angelo) and the nephew of Tina Carter (Luisa Bradshaw-White). On 1 October 2013, it was announced that Dyer had been cast in the role of Shirley and Tina's younger brother, Mick, along with his partner Linda Carter (Kellie Bright), though it emerged that he is actually Shirley's son. The character became the new landlord of The Queen Victoria public house, appearing from Christmas 2013. Executive producer Dominic Treadwell-Collins, who introduced the characters, said: "I'm so excited to have actors of Danny and Kellie's calibre joining what is an already strong and talented company of actors." Dyer said of his casting, "I am so excited about starting a new chapter in my career and cannot wait to become part of the East End family."

Mick was described by the BBC as someone who loves his wife, his children, his pet dog, the monarchy, and the song "Land of Hope and Glory". He was called "a bloke's bloke" and it was said he would "apparently think nothing of throwing on Linda's pink dressing gown and cooking breakfast for the family." Upon the character's announcement, Treadwell-Collins explained that Mick and Linda had been married for over twenty years, and were moving to Walford from Watford. He called it a "good marriage" and said they have "an easy shorthand with each other—but can also still fight like teenagers." He said that the characters would laugh, cry, argue and make up, which would embarrass their children, but would delight their neighbours. It was said that the couple "still love each other, no matter what life throws at them", and that after moving, "life's about to throw them a few curve balls."

== Johnny Carter ==
Johnny Carter, played by Sam Strike from 2013 to 2014 and Ted Reilly from 2016 to 2018, is the son of Mick Carter (Danny Dyer) and Linda Carter (Kellie Bright). On 5 December 2023, it was announced the character would be returning in 2024, with Charlie Suff assuming the role. Johnny's return scenes aired on 9 February 2024.

== Lady Di ==
Lady Di
- EastEnders character
- Portrayed by: Hot Lips
- Duration: 2013–2018, 2021–2022
- First appearance: Episode 4771; 26 December 2013
- Last appearance: Episode 6619; 29 December 2022
- Introduced by: Dominic Treadwell-Collins
- Breed: Bulldog
In-universe information
- Owners: Mick Carter; Linda Carter; Shirley Carter

Lady Di is the Carters' pet bulldog. A new canine character in EastEnders was first known about when Linda Carter (Kellie Bright) and her husband Mick (Danny Dyer) were announced to be joining the series on 1 October 2013. Lady Di was billed as the first major animal character in EastEnders since Wellard died in 2008. The Radio Times speculated what breed of dog would be joining the show, but it was revealed to be a bulldog when the first promotional photo of the entire Carter family together was released on 29 October. Further details were released on 10 November, when it was said the dog's name would be Lady Di, named after Diana, Princess of Wales, by Linda. It was said that in the show's narrative, Linda named the dog after the Princess because "bulldogs are kind, gentle dogs and love kids". Inside Soap said that Lady Di would be "the true queen of the new Vic dynasty", who would "win everybody's hearts from day one". They reported that the dog is "the apple of [...] Mick's eye", and would help show a softer side to Mick's character. A source from EastEnders told the magazine that Lady Di would "make quite an impression" and would be "top dog" in her new home. They added that "Lady Di is at the centre of EastEnders' most exciting new arrivals, and she'll be involved in plenty of drama!" Lady Di was originally portrayed by a bulldog named Tottie, who used the stage name "Hot Lips". Following Hot Lips' death, Lady Di has been portrayed by an uncredited dog since 2021.

After moving into the Queen Victoria public house with her owners, Linda plans to make money by breeding Lady Di's pedigree. However, Lady Di becomes pregnant after mating with Abi Branning's (Lorna Fitzgerald) dog, Tramp (Duffie), to Linda's annoyance. Lady Di gives birth to five puppies, although the youngest almost does not survive until Phil Mitchell (Steve McFadden) saves her. Lady Di stays with Babe Smith (Annette Badland) until she sells the puppies before returning home a couple of months later. After the birth of Mick and Linda's son, Ollie, Lady Di starts behaving in a way that Mick struggles with, and Lady Di is sent to live with Mick's aunt, Tina Carter (Luisa Bradshaw-White), at Carol Jackson's (Lindsey Coulson) house. Lady Di takes a dislike to Tina's girlfriend, Sonia Fowler (Natalie Cassidy), and is sent to live with Mick's mother, Shirley (Linda Henry), without Mick's permission. When Mick finds out, he furiously takes Lady Di back to the Queen Vic, where she is welcomed by Linda, who has missed her. Mick later uses taking Lady Di for walks as way of meeting Shirley in secret. Lady Di alerts Linda that something is wrong with Ollie following a fall from his highchair and she also alerts them when Ollie is suffering a seizure. Following months of roof leaks, the kitchen ceiling collapses on top of Lady Di, who is in her cage at the time. Though Lady Di is not harmed, tests show that she has pneumonia and her insurance does not cover treatment as it is a pre-existing condition, despite that Carters not knowing about it before. Shirley and Linda sell the freehold of the Queen Vic to pay for Lady Di's operation, which is successful.

== Others ==
Character	Date(s)	Actor	Circumstances
Rashid Kayani	1–18 January (3 episodes)	Gurpreet Singh	Members of a family who visit the home of Masood Ahmed (Nitin Ganatra) and Zainab Khan (Nina Wadia). Rashid is the son of Mr and Mrs Kayani, and is Ayesha Rana's (Shivani Ghai) suitor. When they arrive, Ayesha is not there. They wait around but decide to leave, saying the Masood family are chaotic. Zainab's partner Masood finds Ayesha and she meets Rashid. Ayesha tells Rashid some home truths about herself, but he says he only cares that they like each other. Rashid then leaves. Ayesha later decides to see Rashid again, so he visits the next day for dinner. Masood wants to make sure it works out between them because he knows Ayesha has a crush on him. Ayesha decides that she likes Rashid, and they go on a date the next night, and Rashid kisses Ayesha on the cheek. Afterwards, Ayesha tells Masood that it feels "flat" with Rashid. When Rashid calls Ayesha, she makes Masood lie that she is not well. Ayesha lies to Zainab that she has been seeing Rashid, and he sends her a gift. Masood tells Ayesha not to marry Rashid just to please her family, but later urges her to see him when she continues to pursue Masood, so she goes on a date with him.
Mrs Kayani	1 January	Shelley King	
Mr Kayani	1 January	Uncredited	
Reverend Juley Connors	4 January	Katy Maw	The vicar who performs Derek Branning's (Jamie Foreman) funeral.
Janie Rivers	18 January	Lucy Black	A woman from the local council who tells Dot Branning (June Brown) that she is over £1000 in rent arrears.
Dom Edwards	29–31 January (2 episodes)	Christopher Hughes	The new regional manager of the Minute Mart chain of shops, and new boss to Zainab Khan (Nina Wadia) and Denise Fox (Diane Parish).
Imam Ali	1 February	Sanjiv Hayre	The new imam, who visits Zainab Khan (Nina Wadia) to discuss her upcoming wedding. (Not to be confused with the 2009 character, Imam Ali.)
Marcus	4 February	Uncredited	A man who interviews Whitney Dean (Shona McGarty) for a job, though she turns it down as the contract is too long.
Meesha	12 February	Kirsten Foster	A woman who does a deal with Joey Branning (David Witts) to host hen and stag parties at R&R nightclub.
Kyle	18 February	Jamie Davis	A boy at the community centre who refuses to pay attention when being supervised by Whitney Dean (Shona McGarty) and Ava Hartman (Clare Perkins). He pushes over a chair and refuses to pick it up until Ava intervenes.
PC Danson	28 February 2013– 17 June 2014 (2 episodes)	Alice Havillyn	A police officer who questions Phil Mitchell (Steve McFadden) in hospital after he is assaulted by Jack Branning (Scott Maslen) and refuses to press charges. The following year, she questions Nancy Carter (Maddy Hill) and Johnny Carter (Sam Strike) after Sharon Rickman (Letitia Dean) is assaulted at her wine bar.
Dr Farah Singh	28 February	Robert Mountford	The doctor who looks after Phil Mitchell (Steve McFadden), who is in hospital after being attacked by Jack Branning (Scott Maslen).
Sophie Hamilton-Wallace	28 February	Daisy Aitkens	Two women from Walford council's fraud investigation team who interview Dot Branning (June Brown) about a possible benefit fraud.
Elaine Stevens	28 February	Uncredited	Two women from Walford council's fraud investigation team who interview Dot Branning (June Brown) about a possible benefit fraud.
Magda Bakowska	28 February – 4 March (3 episodes)	Wanda Opalinska	A carer hired by Denise Fox (Diane Parish) to look after Patrick Trueman (Rudolph Walker) while he is in a wheelchair following a fall. Patrick does not know Magda has been hired. He allows her to look after him, but he despairs of her fussing. Denise later cancels Magda's services so she and her sister Kim Fox (Tameka Empson) can look after Patrick.
David Dessler	4 March–23 May (3 episodes)	Tristan Beint	David is a solicitor standing in for Jimmie Broome (Samuel James) when Phil Mitchell (Steve McFadden) and Lola Pearce (Danielle Harold) attend court in the hope that Lola can increase her access visits to her daughter Lexi Pearce, whom Phil is caring for. Hattie is Lola's solicitor, and Judge Alex Madeley is the judge. Hattie allows Lola to speak up for herself in court, so David, on Phil's request, tells the court that Lola is late for visits and does not know how to handle Lexi's tears. This angers Lola, who shouts at Phil in court. Because of this, the judge rules that there should be no change in access. In May, the three appear in court again, and Lola is successful in regaining custody of Lexi.
Hattie Brownlow	4 March–23 May (3 episodes)	Amy Hall	
Judge Alex Madeley	4 March–23 May (3 episodes)	Helen Schlesinger	
Mr Garner	11 March	Michael Begley	Tamwar Masood's (Himesh Patel) supervisor on the market. Mr Garner tells Tamwar to get tough with the market traders, demanding they pay their pitch fees.
Donna	18 March	Uncredited	A woman who is given Bianca Butcher (Patsy Palmer) and Kat Moon's (Jessie Wallace) market stall pitch when neither of them arrive to open the stall.
Christine	19 March	Elizabeth Conboy	A financial advisor, who meets Ian Beale (Adam Woodyatt) and his daughter Lucy Beale (Hetti Bywater), when Ian wants a loan to start his own business, a restaurant. Christine refuses after Ian mentions his previous mental illness.
Mick Kane	25–29 March (2 episodes)	Julian Rivett	Kane's (Harry Rafferty) father, who meets Bianca Butcher (Patsy Palmer) when she is handing out leaflets on his estate to try to find her missing son Liam Butcher (James Forde). Mick visits Kane and his gang, and sees Liam, saying he can stay as long as the rent is paid. Mick then hands Kane the leaflet. Later, Bianca comes looking for Liam again and knocks on Mick's door, but he denies seeing him. Mick's last name is not specifically mentioned, but his son is referred to as "Delton Kane" at one point, meaning that Mick's last name is Kane.
DC Sally Booth	26 March 2013– 10 January 2023 (9 episodes)	Sanchia McCormack	A police officer who speaks to Bianca Butcher (Patsy Palmer) after Bianca reports her son Liam Butcher (James Forde) missing. Booth brings up a recent mugging that Liam was questioned about, but Bianca insists he was not involved and does not know the gang who committed the crime, and she leaves, thinking Booth is trying to get her to incriminate Liam. However, Bianca later tells Booth that Liam was involved in the mugging. After Liam and the rest of the gang are arrested, Booth and her colleague DS Bain (Joe Tucker) question Liam about his involvement. When Bianca's daughter Tiffany Butcher (Maisie Smith) is given an MP3 player by one of the gang members and Liam receives death threats, Booth comes to their house and gets Tiffany to identify gang member, Ali. In 2016, Booth arrests Jay Brown (Jamie Borthwick) after it emerges he has been in a relationship with 14-year-old Linzi Bragg (Amy-Leigh Hickman). She questions him the following day and he tells her that he has not had sex with Linzi and did not know how old she was. Booth charges Jay with the possession of indecent images of children, due to there being sexually explicit photos and a video of Linzi on his mobile phone. In 2017, when Louise Mitchell (Tilly Keeper) thinks she has been raped by Keegan Baker (Zack Morris), she and her stepmother, Sharon Mitchell (Letitia Dean), report it to the police. Sally takes Louise's statement and tells Louise that they want her to be physically examined. Booth arrives at The Taylors with PC Jaz Jones (Charlie de Melo) and she arrests Keegan's mother, Karen Taylor (Lorraine Stanley), for assaulting Sharon. In January 2023, she interviews Lily Slater (Lillia Turner) about her teenage pregnancy, working alongside Holly Riley (Lauren Drennan), a social worker. They visit Lily's stepfather, Martin Fowler (James Bye), to discuss Lily's pregnancy, unaware that he does not know about it. They later visit the men who live with Lily: Freddie Slater (Bobby Brazier) and Alfie Moon (Shane Richie); Freddie becomes defensive about the questioning and worries they believe he is the father of the baby. Booth and Holly are concerned to learn Lily's mother, Stacey Slater (Lacey Turner), knows who the father is, and explain that they may have to take Lily into police protection to safeguard her. Booth and Holly reach a conclusion with Stacey to have no men living in the house with Lily. When they visit again, they encourage Stacey to tell them the truth and explain they need to inform the father for safeguarding measures. Lily interrupts their meeting and nearly tells them, but becomes upset, so Booth and Holly leave.
Sheila Morris	26–28 March (2 episodes)	Sara Crowe	A woman whose husband Russell's lost luggage is bought at an auction by Poppy Meadow (Rachel Bright). Poppy contacts Sheila when she finds an address in the suitcase, pleasing Sheila, as Russell lost his cases due to a heart attack. Poppy shows Sheila the envelope, which Sheila opens, finding a letter from Russell to his solicitor, stating that he wants to divorce Sheila. Sheila gives Poppy and her boyfriend Fatboy (Ricky Norwood) Russell's watch as revenge.
Ashleigh	28 March	Claire Wolf	A girl who attends a party hosted by Kane (Harry Rafferty) and his gang, including Liam Butcher (James Forde). She knows Liam from school and warns him about the gang's anti-social behaviour, saying he should leave them. She attempts to leave the party with him, but Kane stops her from doing so and tells her to leave.
Dr Alex Burham	2 April 2013– 12 September 2017 (4 episodes)	Joanna Bending	A doctor who treats Lexi Pearce after she is hospitalised after being sick. She diagnoses Lexi with gastroenteritis. She appears again two years later when Kim Fox-Hubbard (Tameka Empson) is angry with her for letting a stranger leave a teddy bear as a gift for her newborn baby daughter Pearl. Kim apologises to Dr Burnham when she discovers that the bear came from her sister, Denise (Diane Parish). She then treats Jane Beale (Laurie Brett) when she is seriously injured in a fire at her husband Ian's (Adam Woodyatt) restaurant and is hospitalized in a coma. After Jane briefly regains consciousness then goes into cardiac arrest, Dr Burnham tells Ian that Jane may have suffered brain damage.
Lindsay Bassett	4 April	Susie Emmett	A solicitor hired by Ian Beale (Adam Woodyatt) for Dot Branning (June Brown) when she appears in court because of rent arrears.
Siren	8–9 April (2 episodes)	Jennifer Lee Moon	A stripper hired by Fatboy (Ricky Norwood), Tyler Moon (Tony Discipline) and Dexter Hartman (Khali Best) for Jack Branning's (Scott Maslen) stag party. They plan to have Jack locked in the office with her. They see her arrive and text message Joey Branning (David Witts) that she has arrived. He hears footsteps go into the office and locks the door, but then Siren is seen running back to her taxi as she was given the wrong change, and Phil Mitchell (Steve McFadden) is locked in the office instead.
Jake	16 April	Billy Pamphilon	Two men who are first seen in the café where they are rude to Roxy Mitchell (Rita Simons). In the grocery shop, Denise Fox (Diane Parish) refuses to sell them alcohol because they do not have identification to prove their ages, and Shirley Carter (Linda Henry) helps remove them when they threaten to steal from the shop. Later, they arrive in the fast food restaurant where Shirley works, and they are rude to her, dropping their food on the floor. The manager (played by Rahul Kohli) tells her to clean it up, but instead she pours drink on the head of one and rubs chips into the head of the other. She then quits her job.
Rowly	16 April	Max Williams	
Simone Turnbell	29 April	Kate Loustau	Janine Butcher's (Charlie Brooks) lawyer at a mediation meeting between her and her estranged husband Michael Moon (Steve John Shepherd), over custody of their daughter Scarlett Moon.
Wojciech	7–10 May (3 episodes)	Ivan Marevich	A builder colleague of Josef (Aleksandar Mikic) who drinks with other builders in The Queen Victoria public house. Lauren Branning (Jacqueline Jossa) convinces him to buy her a drink.
Marco	10 May	Shaun Stone	Two customers at The Arches garage.
George	10 May	Tom Bonnington	Two customers at The Arches garage.
Mr Murphy	13 May	Uncredited	A customer of Jenna Reagan's (Alexandra Guelff) at Kim Fox's (Tameka Empson) B&B.
Jessica	13 May	Kat Burdette	A nanny hired by Janine Butcher (Charlie Brooks) to look after her daughter Scarlett Moon, angering Scarlett's father, Michael Moon (Steve John Shepherd). Michael's former nanny Alice Branning (Jasmyn Banks) helps Michael by taking Scarlett when Jessica is not looking, and telling Janine that Scarlett was left on her own, leading to Jessica being fired.
Jenna Reagan	13 May – 4 June (2 episodes)	Alexandra Guelff	A masseuse who hires a room at Kim Fox's (Tameka Empson) bed and breakfast. In June, Jenna loses her phone, and it is revealed that she is a prostitute when Dot Branning (June Brown) calls her at random, getting her number from the newspaper, because she wants the church to offer support to prostitutes, and she is horrified that she is holding a meeting with the vicar, Reverend Stevens (Michael Keating), at a brothel. Jenna is subsequently asked to leave the bed and breakfast, and the story is leaked to the local newspaper, the Walford Gazette. It is revealed that one of her regular customers is Mr Lister (Nick Wilton), the market inspector.
Dawn	29 May	Sarah McVicar	When Max (Jake Wood) and Kirsty Branning (Kierston Wareing) go for a baby scan, Dawn is the receptionist confronted by Max, who believes the clinic cancelled their appointment, when in fact Kirsty did. Dawn later helps Kirsty when she suffers a panic attack.
Dave Seymour	3 June 2013– 17 April 2014 (2 episodes)	Will Bliss	A photographer from the Walford Gazette who takes promotional photos for Ian Beale's (Adam Woodyatt) new restaurant. He later appears again working as a reporter for the Gazette, interviewing Ian and his ex-wife and business partner, Jane (Laurie Brett), in the run up to the restaurant's re-opening. Dave wrongly assumes that Ian and Jane are still married and they are forced to correct him. Ian also introduces Dave to his son Peter (Ben Hardy) and shows him round his other businesses.
Miranda Quinn	4 June	Sarah Annis	A colleague of Reverend Stevens (Michael Keating), who meets with Dot Branning (June Brown) to interview her for the position of church warden. Dot has the meeting at Kim Fox's (Tameka Empson) B&B, because she fears there is a snake loose in her own house. Miranda finds a phone, which Kim says belongs to Jenna Reagan (Alexandra Guelff), a masseuse who has been using one of her rooms. Dot tells Miranda and Reverend Stevens she wants to help prostitutes, and calls a number from the local newspaper. Jenna's phone rings, which horrifies Dot, Miranda and Reverend Stevens when they realise the meeting is in a brothel. They are further horrified when the snake escapes from Dot's handbag.
Phil Douglas	6 June	Michael Elkin	A reporter from the East London Star, who interviews Kim Fox (Tameka Empson) to get her side of the story after the Walford Gazette reports that her B&B was a brothel when Jenna Reagan (Alexandra Guelff) was staying there, and a snake escaped when Dot Branning (June Brown) had a meeting there with Reverend Stevens (Michael Keating). Phil hears that Dot was trying to become a church warden, and reports that Kim's "brothel" ruined Dot's chances.
Councillor Byford	7 June	Uncredited	A councillor from the local planning office who attends Ian Beale's (Adam Woodyatt) restaurant opening.
Dr Liz Farley	25 June	Alexandra Gilbreath	A doctor who diagnoses Lauren Branning (Jacqueline Jossa) with alcoholic hepatitis and warns Lauren and her mother Tanya Cross (Jo Joyner) that if Lauren consumes any more alcohol she could die.
PC/DC Dev Bansal	8 July 2013– 15 December 2016 (2 episodes)	Gary Pillai	A police officer who investigates a fire at Ian Beale's (Adam Woodyatt) restaurant, Scarlett's. He questions chef Jean Slater (Gillian Wright) and former waitress Whitney Dean (Shona McGarty) after discovering that Whitney's adoptive mother Bianca Butcher (Patsy Palmer) lied about Whitney's whereabouts. In December 2016, he has been promoted to DC and is part of the Public Protection team. He visits registered sex offender Jay Brown (Jamie Borthwick) to assess his home with the Mitchell family, but when he discovers 15-year-old Louise Mitchell (Tilly Keeper) is living there, he tells Jay he must find alternative accommodation immediately and warns the family that Social Services must be involved. Louise's father Phil Mitchell (Steve McFadden) refuses to let Jay leave, so DC Bansal warns him that Louise may be taken into care.
Sally	15 July	Pepper Harrison	A girl who Joey Branning (David Witts) brings into the café, upsetting Lucy Beale (Hetti Bywater).
Pogo	25 July	Pete Lee-Wilson	A friend of Tony King (Chris Coghill), who delivers a letter from him to Whitney Dean (Shona McGarty).
Frankie	29–30 July (2 episodes)	Max True	A boy at the community centre where Whitney Dean (Shona McGarty) is working. Whitney talks to Frankie, who is sad because his mother is having another child. The next day, Frankie is playing charades with other children.
Mark	2 August	James Marchant	Two men in a group of four seen by Whitney Dean (Shona McGarty). She asks if she can join them in their car but is stopped by Kat Moon (Jessie Wallace). Whitney goes into a pub with the men, but Kat convinces her to not drink with them.
Steve	2 August	Matt Harrison	Two men in a group of four seen by Whitney Dean (Shona McGarty). She asks if she can join them in their car but is stopped by Kat Moon (Jessie Wallace). Whitney goes into a pub with the men, but Kat convinces her to not drink with them.
Elaine	5 August	Uncredited	A woman who Danny Pennant (Gary Lucy) brings to The Queen Victoria public house to let Michael Moon (Steve John Shepherd) know that Danny is actually bisexual, not gay.
Warren	5 August	Billy Geraghty	A friend of Carl White's (Daniel Coonan), who Carl asks to keep Max Branning (Jake Wood) busy at his car lot so that Max cannot meet Kirsty Branning (Kierston Wareing), Carl's ex-girlfriend.
Henry	6 August	Michael Lumsden	A potential investor who meets Janine Butcher (Charlie Brooks) and Danny Pennant (Gary Lucy). On the way to a property, Danny is stopped by Tyler Moon (Tony Discipline) posing as a man repossessing his car, set up by Michael Moon (Steve John Shepherd), so Henry backs out of the deal.
Mary	15 August – 19 September (2 episodes)	Jenny Jules	Lauren Branning (Jacqueline Jossa) and Jake Stone's (Jamie Lomas) alcoholism counsellor.
Colin	16–19 August (2 episodes)	Bob Golding	At a singles' night in R&R, Colin is set up with Bianca Butcher (Patsy Palmer) by AJ Ahmed (Phaldut Sharma) when they promise to find a date for each other. Bianca brings Colin to a double date with her friend Kat Moon (Jessie Wallace) and Colin's friend Ted. Bianca is jealous that Ted is much better looking than Colin, and asks Kat if they can swap. Ted overhears Bianca insulting Colin, so they both leave.
Ted	19 August	Tom Benedict Knight	At a singles' night in R&R, Colin is set up with Bianca Butcher (Patsy Palmer) by AJ Ahmed (Phaldut Sharma) when they promise to find a date for each other. Bianca brings Colin to a double date with her friend Kat Moon (Jessie Wallace) and Colin's friend Ted. Bianca is jealous that Ted is much better looking than Colin, and asks Kat if they can swap. Ted overhears Bianca insulting Colin, so they both leave.
Chloe	20–22 August (2 episodes)	Siobhan Athwal	A girl who Poppy Meadow (Rachel Bright) sees her boyfriend Fatboy (Ricky Norwood) with, after seeing text messages on his phone from her. Poppy suspects Fatboy is cheating on her with Chloe. Poppy decides to leave Walford, especially as the stress of suspecting Fatboy is cheating has caused her to lose her job. She sees Fatboy and Chloe, and accuses him of cheating, so Fatboy reveals Chloe is his colleague and he has started working at the local fast-food restaurant, McKlunky's, to save up for a holiday.
Tara	26–30 August (4 episodes)	Liz May Brice	A guest at the B&B. She meets Billy Mitchell (Perry Fenwick) and he offers to show her where the shops are. The next day she agrees to a date with Billy, and on the date she suggests they have a picnic with Billy's great granddaughter, Lexi Pearce. After the date, Billy takes Tara shopping, saying he will pay for whatever she wants. She buys a dress, shoes and a necklace, and then discovers Billy won the money he has been spending on her. Kim Fox (Tameka Empson) warns Billy off Tara, saying she is only interested in his money, but Billy does not care, saying he is enjoying himself. The next day, Tara tells Billy she has to go to Scotland, but Billy knows this is a lie and calls her cruel for leaving him with his hopes up. She says she was being kind but Billy says he was the kind one, and Tara leaves. Billy tells Kim that he enjoyed his time with Tara, saying it made other men jealous and shop assistants called him "sir".
Kitty	26–30 August (4 episodes)	Chloe May-Cuthill	Kitty is a barmaid at a pub in the New Forest, where Dexter Hartman (Khali Best), Jay Brown (Jamie Borthwick), Abi Branning (Lorna Fitzgerald), Lola Pearce (Danielle Harold), Peter Beale (Ben Hardy) and Cindy Williams (Mimi Keene) are on holiday, selling Kitty's father Bob a car from Phil Mitchell (Steve McFadden). Kitty flirts with Dexter. The next day Bob buys the car for £10,000 cash. When Jay and Abi argue, Jay assumes they have split up and meets Kitty in the pub, leading to them sharing a kiss. When the money goes missing, they blame Bob, and Dexter, Peter and Lola meet Kitty so she can contact Bob. When Bob arrives, the entire gang steal the car back. However, unknown to everyone, Cindy has the cash.
Bob	27–30 August (2 episodes)	Tim Faraday	
Christine	2 September	Louise Bailey	A woman at a group therapy session for alcoholics, attended by Jake Stone (Jamie Lomas), who brings Lauren Branning (Jacqueline Jossa). When Christine speaks, Lauren laughs, causing Jake to take her out of the meeting.
DS Miles Dunstable	5 September	Gavin Kean	Police officers who interview Carl White (Daniel Coonan) after he is involved in a car crash with Phil Mitchell (Steve McFadden). Carl implies his brakes were cut and after saying he parked his car outside Max Branning's (Jake Wood) house, Dunstable and Penrith arrest Max on suspicion of causing criminal damage with intent to endanger life.
DC Brook Penrith	5 September	Julia Dalkin	Police officers who interview Carl White (Daniel Coonan) after he is involved in a car crash with Phil Mitchell (Steve McFadden). Carl implies his brakes were cut and after saying he parked his car outside Max Branning's (Jake Wood) house, Dunstable and Penrith arrest Max on suspicion of causing criminal damage with intent to endanger life.
Frank	13 September	Patrick Driver	A friend of Ollie Walters' (Tony O'Callaghan), who attends his retirement party and speaks to Jean Slater (Gillian Wright) there, causing her to leave when he makes fun of mental illness.
Megan Phillips	16 September	Suzanne Bonetti	Lexi Pearce's child minder, who tries to contact Lexi's mother Lola Pearce (Danielle Harold) when Lexi is unwell.
Nurse Ellen Phillips	16–20 September (2 episodes)	Liza Sadovy	Phil Mitchell's (Steve McFadden) nurse who treats him whilst he recovers from injuries sustained in a car crash. When Phil's mother Peggy Mitchell (Barbara Windsor) visits him, she gets Ellen's phone number for Phil.
Don	27 September	Simon Thorp	Don is Naomi's (Lisa Maxwell) husband and David Wicks' (Michael French) business partner. He arrives at Carol Jackson's (Lindsey Coulson) house, where David and Naomi are, because Naomi has called him. Naomi and David are having an affair and are planning to go to Spain with David's money, but Naomi called Don because David has revealed he is just using her. Don's two associates, Leo and Mick, punch David to get back £20,000 of the money David is planning to give to his daughter, Bianca Butcher (Patsy Palmer), and the three men and Naomi leave. David goes after them to try to get the money back, begging Don to let him have it for Bianca. Don, Leo and Mick beat up David as Carol looks on, and Don tosses him a £1 coin before leaving.
Leo	27 September	Andy Pilgrim	
Mick	27 September	James Cox	
Mr Young	10–11 October (2 episodes)	Simon Coates	The surgeon looking after Sam James (Cornell S John) and Dexter Hartman (Khali Best), for an operation to transplant Dexter's kidney into Sam.
Matthew	11 October	William Findlay	A man who delivers an injunction to Michael Moon (Steve John Shepherd), informing him that he must stay away from his ex-wife Janine Butcher's (Charlie Brooks) home.
Nurse Laura Sneddon or Seddon	11 October – 29 November (4 episodes)	Nathalie Buscombe	The nurse looking after Sam James (Cornell S John) and Dexter Hartman (Khali Best), for an operation to transplant Dexter's kidney into Sam. On Dexter's birthday in November, Sam invites Laura to their home as Dexter had taken a liking to her. However, Dexter puts her off him with his behaviour and she leaves to go to a nightclub alone.
DC Rawlins	28 October	Nicola Goodchild	DC Rawlins interviews Whitney Dean (Shona McGarty) over an alleged assault on Dennis Rickman (Harry Hickles).
DC Edward Lloyd	4 November	Phillip Langhorne	The police officer who interviews Janine Butcher (Charlie Brooks) about the murder of Michael Moon (Steve John Shepherd).
DS Sally Grant	4 November	Sara Poyzer	The police officer who interviews Alice Branning (Jasmyn Banks) about the murder of Michael Moon (Steve John Shepherd), and charges her with the murder.
PC Carrie White	7 November	Claire Lichie	A police officer who allows Janine Butcher (Charlie Brooks) back into her house following the murder of Michael Moon (Steve John Shepherd) there.
DS Noah Baker	8 November	Sam Wilkin	A police officer who visits Ian Beale (Adam Woodyatt) because he has not confirmed that he will give evidence in court against Max Branning (Jake Wood). Ian confirms that he will.
Rob Topp	8–11 November (2 episodes)	Dean Roberts	A loan shark who demands £1000 from Kirsty Branning (Kierston Wareing) the next day, or he will seize her possessions. When he arrives, Kirsty is absent, so Rob and his colleagues start working out what they will take from Cora Cross (Ann Mitchell), Lauren Branning (Jacqueline Jossa) and Abi Branning (Lorna Fitzgerald), but Kirsty arrives with cash.
Jeff Holland	12 November	Richard Huw	Jeff Holland is Max Branning's (Jake Wood) solicitor when he is on trial, accused of causing a car crash, and Gerald Palmer is the prosecuting solicitor. Jeff questions Carl White (Daniel Coonan), who was injured in the crash, but when witness Ian Beale (Adam Woodyatt) fails to arrive, Holland urges the judge (Philip Bird) to accept there is no case to answer, and a jury then find Max not guilty.
Gerald Palmer	12 November	Jonathan Tafler	Jeff Holland is Max Branning's (Jake Wood) solicitor when he is on trial, accused of causing a car crash, and Gerald Palmer is the prosecuting solicitor. Jeff questions Carl White (Daniel Coonan), who was injured in the crash, but when witness Ian Beale (Adam Woodyatt) fails to arrive, Holland urges the judge (Philip Bird) to accept there is no case to answer, and a jury then find Max not guilty.
Rhoda	22 November	Rebecca Thorn	A palm reader who attends Roxy Mitchell's (Rita Simons) hen party.
Reverend Daniel Peters	25–26 November	David Annen	The vicar who performs Alfie Moon (Shane Richie) and Roxy Mitchell's (Rita Simons) wedding.
Dean	28–29 November	Robin Crouch	Lola Pearce (Danielle Harold) meets Dean at a snooker club, and the next day invites him to Dexter Hartman's (Khali Best) birthday party as her date. Peter Beale (Ben Hardy) is jealous, and when Dean says that single mothers like Lola are "easy", Peter punches him. Dexter's father Sam James (Cornell S John) then throws him out.
Mark Sager	5–26 December (3 episodes)	Matthew Douglas	Alice Branning's (Jasmyn Banks) solicitor, who tells her brother Joey Branning (David Witts) and aunt Carol Jackson (Lindsey Coulson) that she should plead guilty to the manslaughter of Michael Moon (Steve John Shepherd). He attends court when Alice pleads guilty to murder. After Janine Butcher (Charlie Brooks) is arrested for the murder, Sager visits Joey and tells him that Alice will not be released because she already pleaded guilty.
Dr Hall	17 December	Grant Gillespie	The resident GP on Albert Square, who Carol Jackson (Lindsey Coulson) visits when she finds a lump in her breast.
Cyril	19 December	Uncredited	A customer at Linda Carter's (Kellie Bright) pub in Watford.
Dougie	20 December	Nick Grimshaw	A caretaker at the community centre.
Lenny	20 December	John Walters	A drunk man at an event for pensioners at the community centre. He interrupts Lauren Branning (Jacqueline Jossa) and Jake Stone (Jamie Lomas) secretly kissing, and then dances with Kat Moon (Jessie Wallace).
Mr Rana	24 December 2013– 13 January 2014 (2 episodes)	Ravi Aujla	The consultant who Carol Jackson (Lindsey Coulson) sees when she has a mammogram. He later confirms that Carol has breast cancer.
PC Scott Beckley	25 December 2013– 11 February 2016 (5 episodes)	Richard Hurst	A police officer who arrests Janine Butcher (Charlie Brooks) for the murder of Michael Moon (Steve John Shepherd). He later escorts Lola Pearce (Danielle Harold) home after arresting her for shoplifting. Beckley lets Lola off with a caution. He then appears at the police station, visiting Ben Mitchell (Harry Reid) in his cell after he is arrested for the murder of Lucy Beale (Hetti Bywater), mocking him when he realises that Ben has not eaten. He later brings Ben a drink and explains that there has been a hold up, making Ben become impatient. Beckley makes a joke and leaves the cell. Beckley later visits Denise Fox (Diane Parish) whilst looking for Jordan Johnson (Joivan Wade) when he absconds from hospital after being assaulted by a gang.
