= Cindy Williams (EastEnders) =

Fictional character from EastEnders

- EastEnders character
- Mimi Keene as Cindy Williams (2014)
- Portrayed by: Ella Wortley (1998–1999); Cydney Parker (1998–1999); Eva Sayer (2007); Mimi Keene (2013–2015)
- Duration: 1998–1999, 2007, 2013–2015
- First appearance: Episode 1692; 9 November 1998
- Last appearance: Episode 5122; 18 August 2015
- Introduced by: Matthew Robinson (1998); Diederick Santer (2007); Lorraine Newman (2013)
In-universe information
- Occupation: Student; Waitress; Chip shop assistant
- Family: Beale
- Father: Nick Holland
- Mother: Cindy Beale
- Adoptive father: Ian Beale (foster)
- Adoptive mother: Jane Beale (foster)
- Half-brothers: Steven Beale; Peter Beale; Bobby Beale (foster)
- Half-sisters: Lucy Beale; Gina Knight; Anna Knight
- Daughters: Beth Williams
- Grandmothers: Bev Williams
- Aunts: Gina Williams
- Nephews: Louie Beale; Jimmy Beale
- Nieces: AJ Branning

Cindy Williams is a fictional character from the BBC soap opera EastEnders, that has been played by four actresses since being introduced in 1998. She makes her debut in episode 1692, originally broadcast on 9 November 1998. Cindy is brought up by her maternal grandmother and aunt off-screen after her mother, Cindy Beale (Michelle Collins), had supposedly died off-screen in prison during childbirth. In 2023, Cindy Sr was revealed to be alive, confirming that she had not died during childbirth and had gone into a witness protection programme. The character's most prominent storylines see her learn of (and subsequently come to terms with) the murder of her half-sister Lucy (see Who Killed Lucy Beale?), enter a relationship with Liam Butcher (James Forde), and struggle as a teenage mother to daughter Beth Williams. Cindy made an unannounced departure on 17 August 2015.

Ella Wortley and Cydney Parker both portrayed the role from 1998 to 1999, followed by Eva Sayer in a brief appearance in 2007. On 18 July 2013, it was announced that Cindy would return to the series as a regular character, with Mimi Keene taking over the role. Cindy leaves her home in Devon to join her half-siblings Peter (Ben Hardy) and Lucy Beale (Hetti Bywater) in Walford.

== Creation and development ==
=== Conception, birth, and custody battle ===
The chaotic relationship of the fictional character Cindy Beale (Michelle Collins) with her husband Ian Beale (Adam Woodyatt) has been struggling for some time. The marriage is damaged by both partners' selfishness and Cindy's promiscuity, with Cindy growing tired of Ian, which leads to an affair with Ian's half-brother David Wicks (Michael French). However, Ian discovers their relationship and vows to obtain custody of their children, Steven, Peter and Lucy. Later, Cindy snaps and hires a hitman to kill Ian; when this proves unsuccessful she flees the country with the help of David and Barry Evans (Shaun Williamson), taking Steven and Peter to Italy.

A couple of years later, viewers see her begin an affair with businessman Nick Holland (Dominic Taylor), before she is tracked by a private investigator, with her sons abducted and taken back to Britain. Cindy, who has been forced to leave Lucy behind, is desperate to have her back - and follows Ian back to Walford with Nick. After gaining custody of her children, she is arrested moments later for attempted murder when Ian's associates persuade the hitman, John Valecue (Steve Weston), to tell the police that Cindy has hired him. Ian is then given custody of their children, with Cindy being charged and held on remand. Although she has become pregnant with Nick's child, he abandons her in prison after realizing her true nature and knowing she is guilty of shooting Ian.

As the soap opera progresses, Cindy Beale later gives birth to her daughter (Ella Wortley and Cydney Parker) off-screen in prison, but Ian is informed that she has died in childbirth from an embolism. He is forced to break the news to their children, which devastates him. Ian is shocked to be told that, as he is still officially Cindy’s next of kin, he is in line for custody of the child. On attending Cindy’s funeral, Ian meets with Cindy's mother Bev Williams (Diane Langton), who agrees Ian should have custody of the baby, and Cindy is named after her mother. However, Bev's another daughter Gina (Nicola Cowper), is unable to have children, and Ian decides to let her have custody. Cindy is therefore not seen again until years later, where she makes a brief appearance, played by Eva Sayer, when Ian visits Devon thinking Gina is sending him poison pen letters as Cindy, his wife.

=== Reintroduction (2013) ===
On 18 July 2013, EastEnders revealed that Cindy would be returning, with the role recast to actress Mimi Keene, who had previously performed in Kin at London's Royal Court Theatre during 2010, before starring in Sadie J and war drama Our Girl. Keene made her first appearance as Cindy on 20 August 2013.

== Storylines ==
Cindy is born to Cindy Beale (Michelle Collins) and Nick Holland (Dominic Taylor) in prison, as her mother is serving a sentence for hiring a hitman to murder her former husband Ian Beale (Adam Woodyatt). Cindy Sr supposedly dies shortly after the birth due to an embolism. Nick is not interested in his daughter, so Cindy lives with her grandmother Bev Williams (Diane Langton) and aunt Gina Williams (Nicola Cowper) in Devon. Ian is aware of the responsibility he has towards Cindy Jr as her guardian, and is concerned as to who should care for her. However, Bev is unwilling to look after Cindy due to her age and suggests that Ian has her, but Gina unable to have children, contests this. She is subsequently given custody of Cindy. When Cindy is eight years old, Ian visits Gina and Cindy, thinking Gina is sending him poison pen letters as Cindy Sr, though she is not.

When Cindy is 14 years old, she breaks into Ian's house in Walford, wanting to see her half-brother Peter Beale (Ben Hardy) about something that happened in Devon. Peter tries to drive her away, but Ian allows her to stay. Cindy is difficult, stealing money from Phil Mitchell (Steve McFadden) and winning the Miss Teen Vic beauty pageant by persuading Patrick Trueman (Rudolph Walker) to rig the votes. Despite having attracted the attention of Liam Butcher (James Forde), she has a one-night stand with TJ Spraggan (George Sargeant). She realizes she is pregnant but hides this from Ian as she fears that he will send her back to Devon. Depressed, Cindy drinks heavily and has sex with Liam. She is later found drunk by Tina Carter (Luisa Bradshaw-White), who takes her to the hospital.

When Ian discovers Cindy's pregnancy, he confronts Liam, prompting TJ to admit he is the father. Cindy and TJ decide to raise their baby together, despite initial concern from both families. Cindy struggles to hide her resentment over Ian, who favoured her half-sister Lucy Beale (Hetti Bywater), and tells him and his former wife Jane Beale (Laurie Brett) that Lucy has a cocaine addiction. Soon after, Lucy is murdered. Cindy reveals Lucy's addiction to the police, angering Ian, as he is convinced Lucy only took drugs as a one-off. He throws Cindy out, sending her back to Devon. Cindy attends Lucy's funeral but when Ian tries to make amends, she reminds him that she knows he is lying about his alibi.

A heavily pregnant Cindy returns to Walford and meets Ian, who is trying to reconcile with fiancée Denise Fox (Diane Parish). He shows little interest until he notices Cindy is in labour, and she admits that she ran away after discovering Gina and Bev were planning to have her baby adopted. Ian helps her deliver her daughter Beth Williams. She reconciles with Ian, but this is marred by Denise leaving him and TJ struggling to bond with Beth. TJ admits he cannot cope with being a father and moves to Milton Keynes with his family. Cindy struggles to cope with being a single mother. She confides in Liam, but when she tries to kiss him, he turns her down realizing that it would be for the wrong reasons. Cindy finds a Christmas present addressed to Beth; inside is Lucy's jewellery box. Former police officer Emma Summerhayes (Anna Acton) tries to get information from Cindy in her grief about her involvement in Lucy's death, but fails.

Ian and Jane remarry, but Ian comes to think that Jane murdered Lucy. Jane says that she killed Lucy following a row, but Ian realises she must be lying and works out the actual killer is his young son Bobby Beale (Eliot Carrington). Jane admits to protecting Bobby after seeing him standing over Lucy with the jewelry box, and moving her body to where it was found on Walford Common. Bobby is unaware that he killed Lucy, so the family, including Cindy, decides that they will keep the truth from Bobby, but Peter leaves for New Zealand.

When Ian and Jane leave for their honeymoon, they take Beth with them to allow Cindy some time to herself. Cindy continues to see Liam and confides in him that she misses her teenage life before she becomes a mother. After Ian and Jane return, Cindy is unable to bond properly with her daughter and feels stressed. Cindy abandons Beth in the park, but when she returns to collect her, Beth is not there. A panicked Cindy later finds her with Liam, and fearing that she will be unable to be a good mother, decides to put her up for adoption. When Ian and Jane suggest they adopt Beth, Cindy threatens to leave. After Ian admits that he is using Beth as a distraction from all the pain he endured in losing Lucy, Cindy changes her mind and realizes that she does not want Beth to be adopted by strangers. Wanting her daughter to grow up with her family, she agrees to let the Beales adopt Beth. She soon has second thoughts about the decision, worried that she might still be responsible for Beth and that living in the same house as her will remind her of her failure as a mother. Soon, she gives the Beales an ultimatum: either they let her give Beth up, or she will tell everyone that Bobby killed Lucy. When Ian confronts her about her ultimatum the next day, Jane decides to have Beth live with TJ but regrets it at the same time. When Cindy tries to make things better for them, Ian declares that it will not work and forces her to leave. After learning that Cindy has spent the night at Liam's house, Jane goes there to apologize to her on Ian's behalf, but Liam explains that Cindy has left Walford to stay with friends in Devon and may not be returning. Two weeks later, Liam's grandmother, Carol Jackson (Lindsey Coulson), discovers that Cindy is sleeping underneath Liam's bed. When she refuses to go back to the Beales' house, Carol lets her stay after Jane secretly pays her. Ian accidentally tells Cindy this on the night of her prom. Feeling unwanted, she goes to a bar and asks two older men to buy her drinks. She ignores Liam's warnings and gets into a car with them, but when she decides to leave, they refuse to let her. She returns later and tells Jane how she managed to escape; the men did not harm her. She contemplates leaving Walford for good due to feeling nobody wants her, but Liam convinces her to go home and reunite with her family.

When Carol's brother Max Branning (Jake Wood) is charged with Lucy's murder, Bobby attempts to smash Max's car. Cindy stops him and calls him stupid, so he pushes her, causing her to fall and hit her head on a table, exactly where Lucy was killed. Believing that Jane and Ian have told Carol the truth about Bobby, Cindy tells Liam this. Ian stops Liam from telling Carol or the police and buys Liam and Cindy a one-way ticket each to Devon so the truth does not come out. Carol finds out about this and warns Ian not to mess with her family. Liam demands £100,000 from the Beales in exchange for his silence and departure. Liam and Cindy then go to live with Liam's father Ricky Butcher (Sid Owen) in Düsseldorf, Germany, though Ricky advises them not to take any money from the Beales. Before she leaves, Cindy sends a video message by email to Bobby, informing him that he killed Lucy. However, the email is instead opened by Sharon Mitchell (Letitia Dean). When Cindy calls Bobby from Düsseldorf, Ian takes the phone and tells her never to contact Bobby again.

In June 2023, it is revealed that Cindy Sr. had in fact survived the childbirth to Cindy Jr. and that she had been placed into a witness protection programme after she had informed on her cell mate. Cindy Sr. tells Kathy Beale (Gillian Taylforth) that she has not been in touch with Cindy Jr. because she felt that she had no right to after giving her up and walking away from her. In September 2023, it is revealed that Cindy has broken up with Liam and has gone travelling. In February 2024, Cindy Sr. tracks Cindy down, but their reunion was short lived, as Cindy Jr. told her mother that she wished she really was dead. In April 2024, Cindy Sr. receives a text from Cindy Jr. saying that she hopes that she is okay, with a heart emoji, after Ian had sent Cindy Jr. a message saying that it would mean a lot to Cindy Sr. if she did so.

== Reception ==
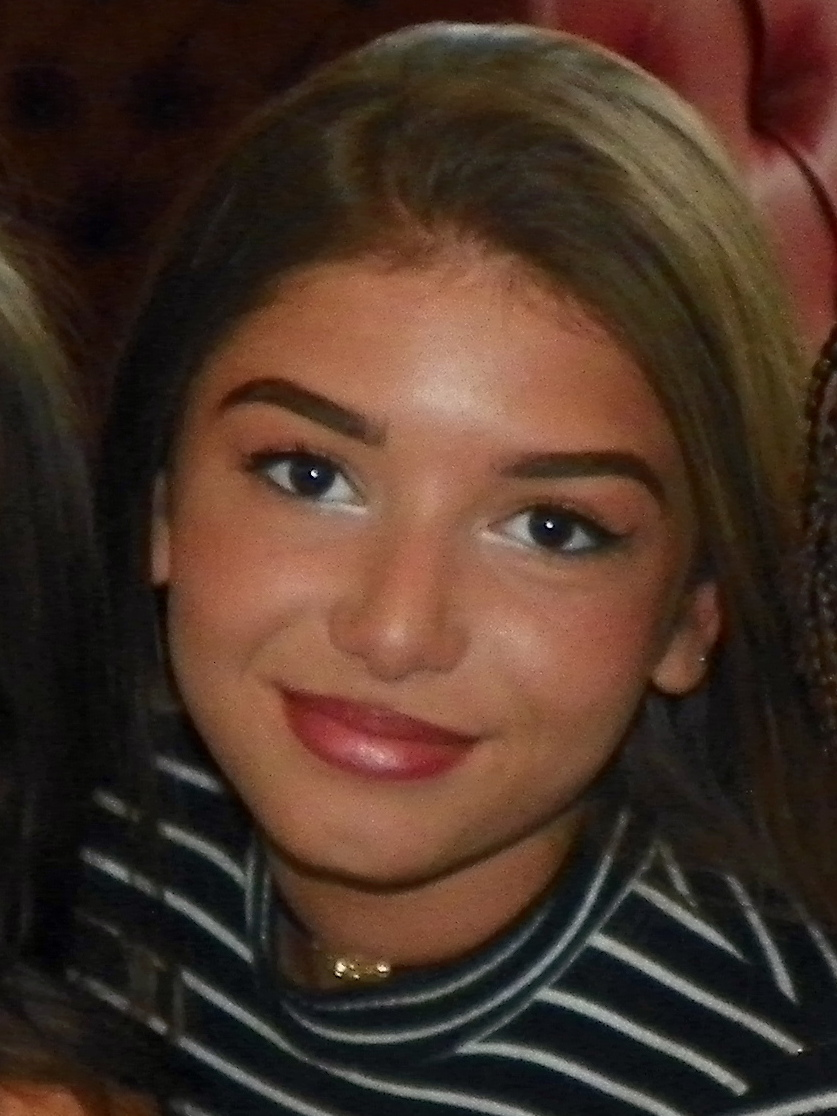
Mimi Keene's (pictured) performance was praised by critics.

After Carol Jackson (Lindsey Coulson) discovers an abandoned pregnancy test in January 2014, she was seen to inquire with family members - possible owners included Carol's daughter Bianca (Patsy Palmer) and Peter's ex-girlfriend Lauren Branning (Jacqueline Jossa). A week later, the test was revealed to belong to Cindy when she was seen to go for an abortion. She had fallen pregnant with TJ Spraggan's baby after a one-night stand, but afterwards decided to keep the baby, before the truth was revealed to their two families. The storyline subsequently received minor negativity from fans, with the Metro's Amy Duncan revealing that some viewers were outraged by what had been deemed as a "gross underage pregnancy storyline". Several EastEnders fans then commented on Twitter to voice their displeasure over the episodes: one said they "[couldn't] be arsed with Cindy being pregnant in Eastenders [...] She has a 5 min cameo every month how is she gonna cope with this storyline?", whilst another felt that the storyline was "just promoting underage pregnancies tbh" rather than actually raising awareness about the issue. Despite this, Keene went on to be nominated in 2014 in the category of "Best Young Performance" at the British Soap Awards for her portrayal of Cindy, but lost to Hollyoaks child actor Ellis Hollins. Anna Howell of Unreality TV praised Keene's birth scenes in an article on who they thought had given the best performances of 2014, with Cindy giving birth to baby Beth rated third on their list for EastEnders. Howell branded Keene's performance as "one of the most powerful, and convincing labour scenes [Unreality TV] have ever seen", and stated that whilst many women had portrayed childbirth in the soaps over the years, given Keene's age and limited experience in soap acting, felt it was worth "a massive mention at just how well this young girl handled something quite as dramatic as the birth of her on-screen daughter."

In 2016, Daniel Kilkelly from Digital Spy put Cindy on his list of seven characters that left EastEnders too soon, writing, "It took us a while to warm to Cindy. Her early storylines of hooking up with TJ (remember him?) and falling pregnant were decent enough as standard soap fare, but they didn't exactly set our screens alight. It was in EastEnders' Live Week last year that Cindy finally shone, breaking down in tears as she read out the heartbreaking letter that Lucy had written before her death. After Mimi Keene's perfectly-pitched performance, we just couldn't wait to see what would happen next to Cindy. But not much did. She packed her bags to leave the Square six months later, but surely more could have been done with her to build up the next generation of Beales."
