= Perfect 10 (film) =

2019 film directed by Eva Riley

- Directed by: Eva Riley
- Written by: Eva Riley
- Produced by: Jacob Thomas; Bertrand Faivre; Valentina Brazzini
- Starring: Frankie Box; Alfie Deegan; Sharlene Whyte
- Cinematography: Steven Cameron Ferguson
- Edited by: Abolfazl Talooni
- Music by: Terence James Dunn
- Production companies: BBC Films; Creative England; British Film Institute iFeatures; The Bureau; Ngauruhoe Films
- Distributed by: 606 Distribution
- Release date: October 3, 2019 (BFI London Film Festival)
- Country: United Kingdom
- Language: English

Perfect 10 is a 2019 British feature film, written and directed by Eva Riley. It stars teenage gymnast and actress Frankie Box as Leigh, whose life and training is disrupted by changes in her family life. The film had its world premiere at the BFI London Film Festival on 3 October 2019, and was released in the UK on the 7 August 2020.

== Plot ==
Leigh is a 15-year-old living with her father and preparing for her first gymnastics competition. Her life is disrupted when her older half-brother Joe, who she never knew she had, unexpectedly moves in. The disruption affects her gymnastics performance and Joe leads her into a world of moped crime.

== Cast ==
- Frankie Box as Leigh, a teenage gymnast
- Alfie Deegan as Joe, Leigh's half brother
- Sharlene Whyte as Gemma, Gymnastics coach
- William Ash as Rob, Leigh's Dad
- Delyse Chate as Alice, Joe's grandmother

== Production ==
The film was shot in and around Brighton, East Sussex. Composed music is attributed to Terence James Dunn, with Crazy, Stoned & Gone by Angelo De Augustine also included on the soundtrack.

== Release ==
Perfect 10 had its world premiere at the BFI London Film Festival on 3 October 2019. It was released on 8 July 2020 in France, and 7 August 2020 in the UK.

== Accolades ==
Cath Clarke in a film review for The Guardian described the film as "a dazzling coming-of-age tale lit up by a pair of remarkable first-time performances". The film won The Discovery Award at the British Independent Film Awards in February 2021.
