= Tony O'Callaghan =

English actor (born 1956)

- Born: 16 June 1956 (age 70); London, United Kingdom
- Occupation: Actor
- Spouse: Siobhan Gallagher (m. 1999)
- Children: 1

Tony O'Callaghan (born 16 June 1956) is a British television actor from London, known for his role of Sergeant Matt Boyden in the ITV police procedural drama The Bill from 1991 to 2003. After leaving The Bill, O'Callaghan played Father Thaddeus in Fair City and Ollie Walters in EastEnders.

== Career ==
O'Callaghan previously appeared as a villain in the fifth series of The Bill in 1989. O'Callaghan played the "flawed", yet popular Sergeant Matthew Boyden in The Bill until 2003. He appeared in over 700 episodes. His character's death led to big ratings for the show.

In addition to his role on The Bill, he has also appeared in the television series The Magnificent Evans, Family Affairs, Holby City, Doctors, Shameless, Three Up, Two Down, The Upper Hand and The Coven (in 2014).

In 2007, O'Callaghan appeared in the UK "Let It Out" Kleenex television advertisement.

He also appeared in the Irish television soap opera Fair City on RTÉ One, where he played the character Father Thaddeus, a British priest living in Dublin, Ireland, and who is having a relationship with a female character. In 2013, he joined the cast of EastEnders, playing Ollie Walters. O'Callaghan said of his casting: "I am very excited to be joining a show with as much prestige as EastEnders and I'm looking forward to portraying the nice side and humour of Ollie". He played the role on a recurring basis until 2016. On 10 June 2018, it was announced that O'Callaghan would make a "brief return" to EastEnders.

O'Callaghan has also appeared in several plays.

== Personal life ==
O'Callaghan is the son of Irish immigrants. He married his partner Siobhan Gallagher in Gougane Barra, West Cork in May 1999. The couple have one child, a daughter, born in 2002.
