= Cloe and Holly Mackie =

British twin sister actors

- Born: Cloe Isabella Mackie; Holly Elizabeth Mackie; 1996 or 1997 (age 28–29); London, England
- Occupation: Actresses
- Years active: 2007 – present

Cloe Isabella Mackie and Holly Elizabeth Mackie (also known as Cloi Mckee and Holli Mckee; born 1996 or 1997) are British twin actresses, best known for playing Tania and Tara, respectively, in the 2007 and 2009 St Trinian's films.

== Filmography ==
=== Cloe Mackie ===
- Home Grown (2006) short film -Zoe
- Wednesday (2006) short film – young Lilya
- Death Defying Acts (2007) feature Film – Psychic Twin One
- St Trinian's (2007) feature film – Tania
- St Trinian's 2: The Legend of Fritton's Gold (2009) feature Film – Tania
- The Coven (2015) feature film – Cara

=== Holly Mackie ===
- Home Grown (2006) short film – Zoe
- Death Defying Acts (2007) feature film – Psychic Twin Two
- St Trinian's (2007) feature film – Tara
- St Trinian's 2: The Legend of Fritton's Gold (2009) feature film – Tara
- The Coven (2015) – feature film – Ruby
