= The Coven (film) =

- Film poster
- Directed by: John Mackie
- Written by: Jayney Mackie
- Produced by: Jayney Mackie
- Starring: Dexter Fletcher; Cloe Mackie; Holly Mackie; Tony O'Callaghan
- Cinematography: Franz Pagot
- Edited by: Ben Hooton
- Music by: Michael Crowther
- Production companies: FX Team Productions; Phelan Good
- Distributed by: 4Digital Media
- Release date: 16 March 2015 (United Kingdom) (DVD)
- Running time: 86 minutes
- Country: United Kingdom
- Language: English

The Coven is a 2015 United Kingdom fantasy horror feature film directed by John Mackie (director) and starring Dexter Fletcher. It is stated that the film is based upon actual events. The plot revolves around a Wiccan group, whose leader Uri Clef, and seven followers disappear. They were last seen at The Coven, a ring of trees in Queens Wood once used as a meeting place by practitioners of Cochrane's Craft. Some schoolkids are drawn to visit Queen's Wood in Highgate on Halloween. The film was finally released direct to DVD in the UK on 16 March 2015.

== Plot ==
The film opens with a map of Queen’s Wood in Highgate. A burning tree appears in a dark night. A goats head is overlaid visually in the tree. The scene then moves to a school where Mr. Shears (Dexter Fletcher) is giving a lesson about Witchcraft. He holds a book with a title page containing the words ‘Diabolus quod igneus frutex’, meaning the devil is the fire tree. He asks the class ‘Is Wicca a religion or little more than devil worship’. He mentions that Robert Cochrane ‘founded a Wicca coven as recently as the 1960s’, and that his coven split up, but later reformed and met in the nearby Queens Wood at the titular coven, a particular ring of trees. He is interrupted by a Mrs. Belial, posing as a supply teacher who tells him that he needs to see the headmaster. He leaves and she takes over the lesson. She explains how there was a spiritual leader and politico, Uri Clef who went missing on Halloween with seven of his followers, and they were last thought to be in Queen’s Wood.

Five of the girls decide to go into the Queens Wood on Halloween, on the way they are involved in a near miss with a biker while crossing a road. They enter the wood and discover the word Lucifer in ash upon the ground. They notice that their five names have first letters that are the letters of Lucifer. Izzy, one of the girls, adds their names in chalk underneath. As they put up their tent they are watched, apparently by the biker from earlier. The film then cuts to the lounge of one of the other girls in the class, Eve, who was not invited, she has found a nursery rhyme that states ‘You can make him go away with a cross stick, you can make him go away with a shoe’. Her private tutor explains that it refers to the devil. He says that there are plague pits in Queen’s Wood and that those who were buried went to the devil. He asks "I wonder how the devil gets people now".

Meanwhile, two boys, Eddie and Louie, decide to take a short cut across the park, but get lost. Their names fill out the two missing letters from the word Lucifer. Eddie climbs a tree for a better view, but is startled by a bat, falls, and is injured by landing on a horn, which Louie refers to as possibly belonging to a deer. Louie leaves him to get help. Meanwhile, Mrs. Belial alone in her flat is seen eating the raw meat of a bird. Later she constructs a model of The Coven out of earth and foliage, and places tin foil figures are inside. It appears that she is doing a magic spell on those in the wood.

The biker picks off seven of the teenagers, including Eve, who has entered the wood after receiving a text asking for help. The fire tree reappears, and images of seven of the teenagers are shown being sucked into the tree. The name Lucifer on the ground of the coven is completed with the names of Louie and Eve, it is implied that Eddie is not taken by the biker and so survives. The film ends with the singing of the nursery rhyme.

== Cast ==
- Dexter Fletcher as Mr. Sheers
- Cloe Mackie as Cara
- Holly Mackie as Ruby
- Tony O'Callaghan as Charlie
- Mark Harris as Edward Latimer
- Howard Lee as Eve's Tutor
- Magda Rodriguez as Mrs. Belial
- Billy Red Mackie as Louie
- Kazim Benson as Eddy
- Madeleine Rose Witney as Izzy
- Maya Charlery as Fran
- Rachel Summers as Eve
- Fiona Maeve O'Brien as Ulrika
- Josie Benson as Eve's Mum

== Reception ==
The Coven received generally poor reviews from critics. It received 0.5 out of 5 when reviewed at the Pagan Federation website.

== See also ==
- List of films about witchcraft
