= Alfie Deegan =

British actor

- Born: 2001 (age 24–25); London, England
- Occupation: Actor
- Years active: 2019–present
- Television: EastEnders

Alfie Deegan (born 2001) is an English actor. He is known for playing the role of Liam Butcher on the BBC soap opera EastEnders in 2021. Deegan also guest starred in an episode of The Chelsea Detective and portrayed the role of Flynn in the film Silver Haze in 2023. That same year, Deegan began releasing rap music under the stage name Alf.

== Career ==
In 2019, Deegan was cast for the short film Perfect 10, his first role. In 2021, Deegan took over the role of Liam Butcher from James Forde on the BBC soap opera EastEnders for 2 months. His storylines during his stint on the soap included a feud with Keegan Baker (Zack Morris), accidentally abducting Frankie Lewis (Rose Ayling-Ellis) whilst trying to steal cars and sell them for Janine Butcher (Charlie Brooks). In 2022, he was cast for a guest role on The Chelsea Detective for 1 episode as Jake Turner. Deegan then appeared in the short film Taylor in 2022, and in 2023, he was cast for the role of Flynn in a film called Silver Haze.

In January 2023, Deegan revealed that he had returned to working on a construction site in between his acting career. Deegan also began releasing rap music in 2023 under the stage name Alf.

== Filmography ==
| Year | Title | Role | Notes |
|---|---|---|---|
| 2019 | Perfect 10 | Joe | Film |
| 2021 | EastEnders | Liam Butcher | Regular role |
| 2022 | The Chelsea Detective | Jake Turner | Guest role |
| 2022 | Taylor | Short Mark | Short film |
| 2023 | Silver Haze | Flynn | Film |
