= Rachel Wilde =

British actress

- Born: Rachel Wilson; East London, London, UK
- Occupation: Actress
- Known for: EastEnders (2013–14)

Rachel Wilde (born Rachel Wilson) is a British actress who played Nikki Spraggan in the BBC soap opera EastEnders.
