= James Marchant =

British eugenicist, social reformer and author

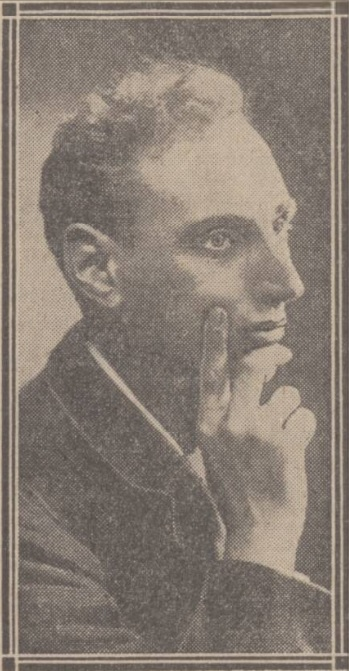
- Born: 18 December 1867; London
- Died: 20 May 1956 (aged 88)
- Occupations: Social reformer, author
- Spouse: Eleanor Jane Gordon

Rev Sir James Marchant KBE FRSE FLS FRAS LLD (1867–1956) was a British eugenicist, social reformer and author. He was leader of the National Vigilance Association, concerned with social morality, and also the Director of the National Council of Public Morals. He epitomised the view of the priggish Victorian attitude to sex and morality.

== Life ==
James Marchant was born in London on 18 December 1867.

Between 1889 and 1893, Marchant was a lecturer on Christian apologetics to the Bishop of St Albans and to the Christian Evidence Society.

In 1895, Marchant became a minister of an independent Congregational church in Plymouth. He went on to lead a Presbyterian church in north London before serving as an assistant minister to a Presbyterian church in Clapham.

In 1903, he became clerical secretary to Dr Barnardo's Homes.

In 1913, he was appointed secretary of the National Birth-rate Commission.

In 1917, he was elected a Fellow of the Royal Society of Edinburgh. His proposers were Sir Thomas Clouston, Sir Alexander Russell Simpson, John Arthur Thomson and John William Ballantyne.

In 1921, Marchant was created a Knight Commander of the Order of the British Empire by King George V for his work on birth-rate and contraception.

Marchant died at his home in Sherborne on 20 May 1956.

== Family ==
In 1895, he married Eleanor Jane Gordon.

== Publications ==
- Theories of the Resurrection of Christ (1896)
- Theories of the Person of Christ (1903)
- Social Hygienics: A New Crusade (1909)
- Aids to Purity (1909)
- A Plea for Regeneration (1912)
- The Cleansing of a City (1917)
- The Master Problem (1917)
- The Coming Renaissance (1923)
- British Preachers (1927)
- The Coming of Age of Christianity (1951)
- Winston Spencer Churchill: Servant of Crown and Commonwealth (1954, edited)
- The Censorship of Low Orade Literature
- The Reunion of Christendom
- The Life of Alfred Russel Wallace
