= Mimi Keene =

English actress (born 1998)

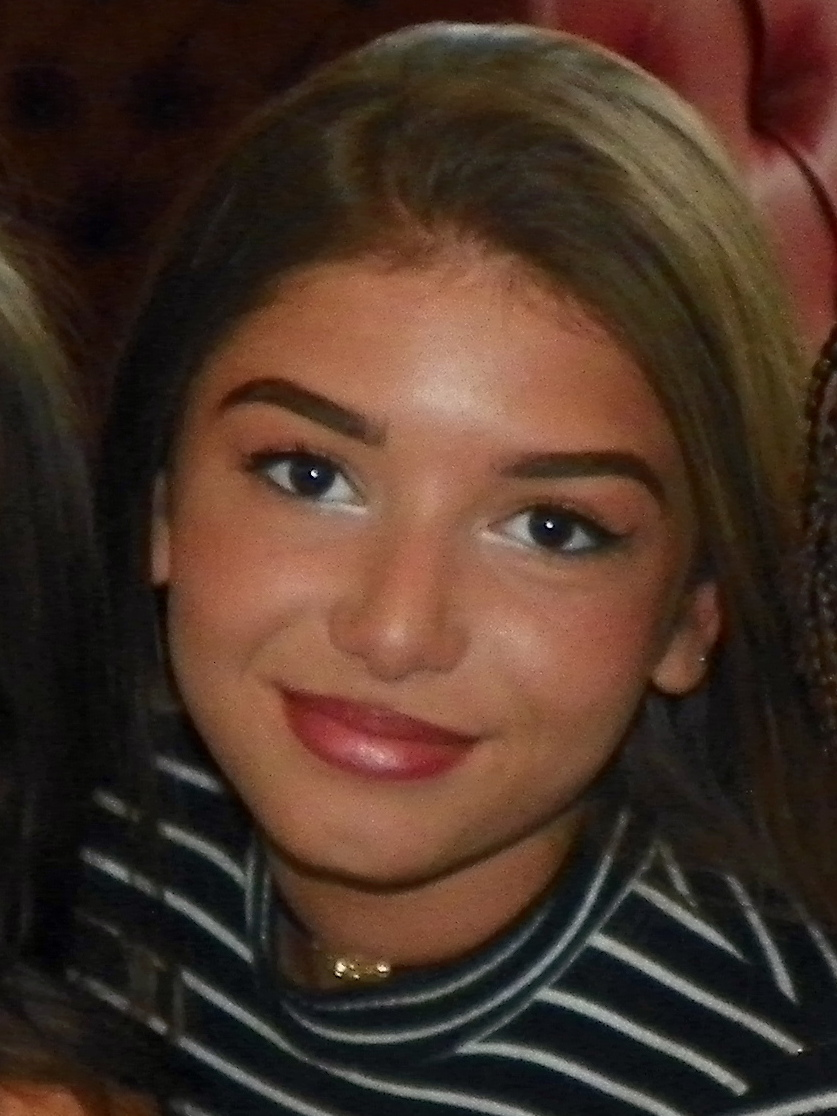
- Keene in June 2016
- Born: Mimi Roshan Saeed; 5 August 1998 (age 27); London, England
- Occupation: Actress
- Years active: 2010–present

Mimi Roshan Saeed (born 5 August 1998), better known as Mimi Keene, is an English actress. She is known for her roles as Cindy Williams on the BBC soap opera EastEnders (2013–2015), Ruby Matthews on the Netflix comedy-drama series Sex Education (2019–2023), and Natalie in the film After Everything (2023).

== Early life ==
Keene was born Mimi Roshan Saeed in the Redbridge area of London on 5 August 1998. She is the daughter of Alexis Keene, whose mother is English, the daughter of Polish-German parents, and Hassan Saeed, a British man of Bulgarian-Pakistani descent. She lived in South Woodford and attended Churchfields Junior School. She then moved to Hertfordshire and attended Divine Saviour Roman Catholic School in Abbots Langley, before training in acting at the Italia Conti Academy of Theatre Arts in Barnsbury from 2009 to 2014.

== Career ==
Keene began her career as a child actress on stage, making her professional debut playing Janey in Kin at The Royal Court Theatre from 19 November to 23 December 2010. In 2013, she appeared in CBBC's Sadie J as Brandy May Lou and in Our Girl as Jade Dawes. Between 2013 and 2015, she was a series regular in EastEnders, playing Cindy Williams. For her role, she earned British Soap Award and Inside Soap Award nominations. She voiced Euryale, Stheno, and Medusa in the 2013 video game Castlevania: Lords of Shadow – Mirror of Fate and its 2014 sequel Castlevania: Lords of Shadow 2. In 2016, she appeared in an episode of Casualty as Lana Westmore, and played Megan in a short film, The Escape, in 2017. In 2019, she portrayed the younger version of Edith Tolkien in Tolkien, also in 2019 she began playing Ruby Matthews in the Netflix series Sex Education, and appeared in the film Close. In 2023, Keene appeared in the film After Everything. She appeared in the BBC's 2025 adaptation of Agatha Christie's Towards Zero, as Kay Elliott-Strange.

== Filmography ==
=== Film ===
Year	Title	Role	Notes	Ref.
2017	The Escape	Megan	Short film	
2019	Close	Claire		
2019	Tolkien	Young Edith Bratt		
2023	After Everything	Natalie		

=== Television ===
Year	Title	Role	Notes	Ref.
2013	School for Stars	Herself	Series 3; episodes 3 & 5	
2013	Sadie J	Brandy May Lou	Series 3; episode 6: "Dederama"	
2013	Our Girl	Jade Dawes	Feature-length television pilot episode	
2013–2015	EastEnders	Cindy Williams	Regular role. 127 episodes	
2016	Casualty	Lana Westmore	Series 30; episode 27: "High Tide"	
2019–2023	Sex Education	Ruby Matthews	Main role. Series 1–4; 24 episodes	
2025	Towards Zero	Kay Elliott-Strange	Mini-series; episodes 1–3	

=== Video games ===
Year	Title	Role	Notes	Ref.
2013	Castlevania: Lords of Shadow – Mirror of Fate	Eurayle / Stheno / Medusa	Voice	
2014	Castlevania: Lords of Shadow 2	Eurayle / Stheno / Medusa	Voice and motion capture	

== Awards and nominations ==
Year	Award	Category	Result	Ref.
2014	British Soap Awards	Best Young Performance	Nominated	
2014	Inside Soap Awards	Best Young Actor	Nominated	
2015	Inside Soap Awards	Best Young Actor	Nominated	
