= George Sargeant =

British actor (born 1997)

- Born: 30 November 1997 (age 28)
- Occupation: Actor
- Years active: 2011–present
- Television: Doctors (2011); EastEnders (2013–2014, 2018)

George Sargeant (born 30 November 1997) is a British actor. He is best known for playing the role of TJ Spraggan in the BBC soap opera EastEnders.

== Career ==
Sargeant made his acting debut during a two part episode of the BBC medical drama Doctors as Ross Milton on 19 and 20 October 2011. Then in 2013 featured in a 28 episodes in the BBC soap EastEnders as TJ Spraggan between 7 November 2013 and 12 September 2014. Sargeant reprised the role in 2018 and the character appeared on 18 and 19 January.

== Filmography ==
=== Television ===
Year	Title	Role	Notes
2011	Doctors	Ross Milton	Dougal and the Factory: Part 1+2
2011	Holby City	Woody Blakeman	See You on the Ice
2012	One Night	Fitz	3 episodes.
2013–2014, 2018	EastEnders	TJ Spraggan	30 episodes.
2013	The Big Albert Square Dance	Himself	
2014	The British Soap Awards	Himself	
2016	The Hollow Crown	Falstaff's Boy	1 episode.
2023	Sister Boniface Mysteries	Ben Matthews	1 episode.
2024	Casualty	Lachlan Daniels	1 episode.

=== Film ===
Year	Title	Role
2011	Halloween (Short)	Colbran
2011	Wildland (Short)	Gang Member
2012	Broken	Dillon
2012	What If (Short)	Joe
2016	The Hand of the Creator (Short)	Michael
2016	City of Tiny Lights	Stuart

=== Stage ===
Year	Title	Role
2009	Les Misérables	Gavroche

== Awards and nominations ==
Year	Award	Category	Result	Ref.
2014	Inside Soap Awards	Best Young Actor	Nominated	
