= Ava Hartman =

Fictional EastEnders character

- EastEnders character
- Portrayed by: Clare Perkins
- Duration: 2012–13
- First appearance: Episode 4534; 20 November 2012
- Last appearance: Episode 4764; 17 December 2013
- Introduced by: Lorraine Newman
In-universe information
- Occupation: Teacher
- Mother: Cora Cross
- Half-sisters: Rainie Cross; Tanya Branning
- Husband: Sam James (until 2013)
- Sons: Dexter Hartman
- Nephews: Oscar Branning
- Nieces: Lauren Branning; Abi Branning

Ava Hartman is a fictional character from the BBC soap opera EastEnders, played by Clare Perkins. Perkins' casting was announced in September 2012 and she made her first appearance on 20 November 2012. Ava had previously been mentioned in 2012 as the long-lost daughter of established character Cora Cross (Ann Mitchell) and the half-sister of Tanya Branning (Jo Joyner), who never knew she had another sibling. Cora initially claims that Ava died shortly after birth, but she actually was forced to give her up for adoption. When Tanya discovers the truth, she tracks Ava down and Ava ends up meeting Cora. Ava and her son Dexter Hartman (Khali Best) end up moving to Walford when Ava tries to help Liam Butcher (James Forde) with a gang that Dexter used to be part of. Perkins praised the soap for raising awareness of gangs as she grew up in London and it was an issue that she was passionate about.

Ava later has a brief romance with Billy Mitchell (Perry Fenwick), though Perkins did not believe that the pair were suited for each other. EastEnders later introduced Ava's former husband and Dexter's father, Sam James (Cornell John), and he and Ava rekindle their relationship. However, it is later revealed that Sam only tracked them down to get Dexter to donate his kidney to him, which leads to the end of their second relationship. In September 2013, it was announced that both John and Perkins would be leaving EastEnders, and Ava made her last appearance on 17 December of that year. Ava's debut episode was watched by 7.71 million viewers when it aired, making it the most watched soap opera of the day.

== Casting and characterisation ==
In September 2012, it was announced that Claire Perkins had been cast in the role of Ava Hartman, the long-lost daughter of established character Cora Cross (Ann Mitchell) and the half-sister of Tanya Branning (Jo Joyner). Perkins' casting had been rumoured prior to it being confirmed a few days later. Perkins had previously appeared in another soap opera, Family Affairs, and had previously appeared in EastEnders in 1997 as a member of a darts team. Ava was characterised as having just turned 48-years-old upon her introduction. In her official BBC profile, Ava was described as being "shrewd, determined, and strong", and having a "good heart" despite seeming "hard".

== Development ==
=== Backstory and introduction ===
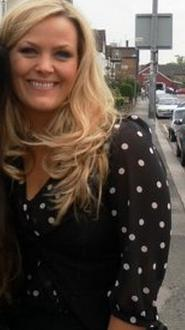
Jo Joyner portrays Ava's long-lost half-sister Tanya Branning, who tracks Ava down.

Ava was first mentioned in July 2012 in a storyline where Tanya discovers a document of Cora's that reveals a "shocking family secret" that Cora has kept from her: a birth certificate that revealing that Cora gave birth to another daughter, Ava, that Tanya never knew about. Tanya confronts Cora and she tell Tanya that Ava died shortly after being born, but Tanya does not accept her explanation and is confused as to why Cora kept it a secret for so long. However, months later, Cora admits to Tanya that she lied about Ava being stillborn and that she actually gave her up for adoption. Speaking about the storyline, Mitchell told Soaplife that Cora's parents forced her to give Ava up for adoption after her making her feel enormous "shame", revealing that Ava's father "was black and he left Cora before he knew she was pregnant. She was 18 and unmarried, and at that time, having a baby in her situation was a social stigma". Mitchell explained that Cora kept Ava a secret as she felt a great sense of guilt and she also wanted to "keep things as safe and uncomplicated as they could be". Mitchell also teased that Ava's arrival would cause "mayhem", adding, "The implications will be huge. The family will want answers, and I'm sure we won't be seeing the back of Ava".

Perkins made her first appearance on 20 November 2012. In the episode, Tanya and Patrick Trueman (Rudolph Walker) go to the school that Ava works at to meet her, though Patrick is reluctant to as he believes that it is not what Cora would want. Tanya pretends that she is enquiring about her son Oscar Branning (Neo Hall) possibly joining the school and hopes to find the right moment to tell Ava the truth, but she panics and leaves instead. Tanya leaves her purse and Ava, clueless about Tanya's real identity or reason for visiting her, comes to Albert Square to return her purse, and she comes face to face with Cora, who answers Tanya's door. With both Ava and Cora unaware of their relationship, Cora invites Ava inside for a cup of tea. Daniel Kilkelly from Digital Spy hinted that this would change the lives of both women "forever" when Ava properly introduces herself. Perkins believed that Ava and Cora are two "completely different people" and that trying to build a relationship between them is difficult, although the actress saw that it was getting easier. She believed that Ava does not like Cora a lot even though she wants to. Ava's BBC profile explained that Ava had grown up with a happy adoptive family and did not feel the need to seek out her biological parents.

Shortly after Ava's debut, it was announced that actor Khali Best had been cast as Ava's son, Dexter Hartman, who arrived in 2013 to meet his extended family. Ava's BBC profile explained that whilst Ava wants to keep her biological family at a "safe distance", Dexter enjoys bonding with Cora, which makes Ava uncomfortable. The profile added that Ava enjoys living a "quiet life" and that she feels that she will become "embroiled" in her new family's various issues the more she gets to know them. In March 2013, it was reported that Perkins' contract had been extended by six months. Perkins commented that she felt "really settled in" and bonded a lot with Best, adding that they often laugh together and call each other "mum" and "son". Perkins later said that she was making the most of all the "wonderful stuff" that she had been given, commenting, "As an actor, you never know how long a job like this will last. I feel like I've settled in, but I can't sit back and think, 'That's it'. I want to do a really good job". In another storyline, Ava sees Bianca Jackson (Patsy Palmer) struggling with her son Liam Butcher (James Forde) getting involved in a gang that Dexter used to be in and she does everything she can to help, much to Dexter's reluctance. Perkins praised EastEnders for tackling the topic of street gangs as she grew up in London and she would often see stories on the news about young people being stabbed, with Perkins commenting, "I have known youngsters who have lost their lives. I don't want to get too personal about it, but it is something that I'm passionate about. It's just senseless". Perkins enjoyed working with Patsy Palmer, who plays Bianca Jackson, during the storyline, commenting that Palmer "really sweet and really funny" and nothing like Bianca. Ava's involvement leads to her home being trashed and being branded as a "snitch", which leads to her and Dexter moving to Walford. Perkins had previously revealed that Ava and Dexter would move to Albert Square. The actress added that she and Best liked the setting of their house, adding, "I love Ava's kitchen - there are things in there that I really want for myself. In fact, I keep thinking it's a lot nicer than my place".

=== Relationships ===
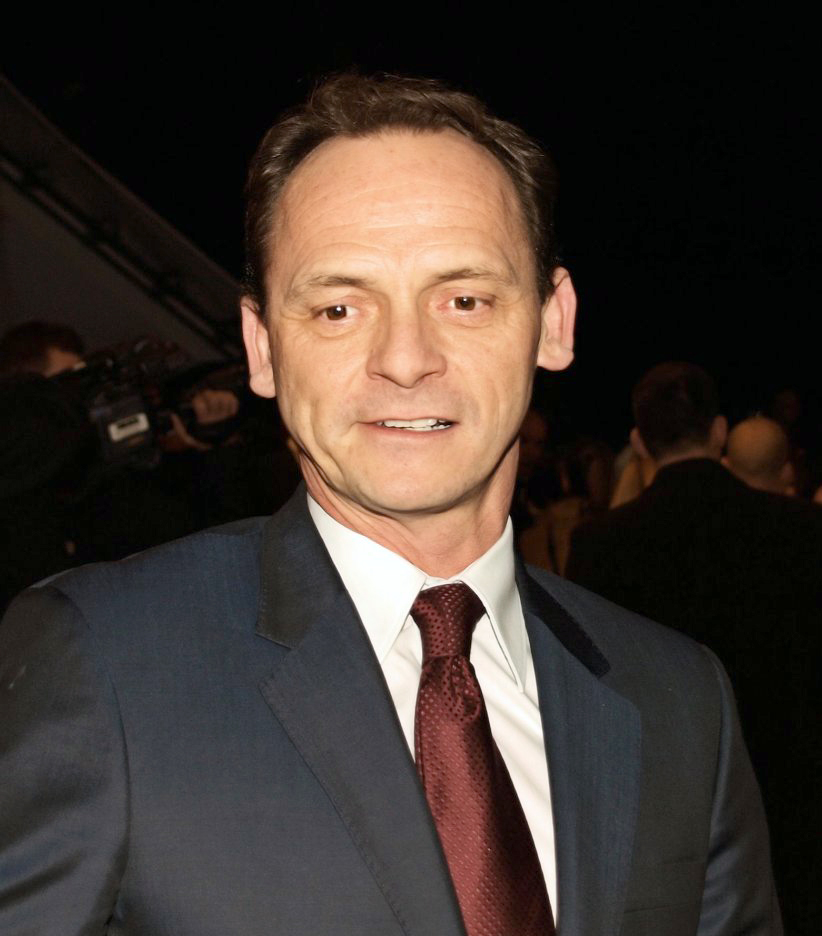
Perry Fenwick portrays Billy Mitchell, a love interest for Ava.

In 2013, established character Billy Mitchell (Perry Fenwick) becomes romantically interested in Ava and he tries to impress her by fixing a scratch on her car, despite not knowing what he is doing; Dexter steps in to help him and Ava is grateful to Billy and the three go out for a drink together. Speaking of Billy's interest in Ava, Perkins told Inside Soap, "Ava has been by herself a long while, and I think she can't be bothered with relationships. But as the years go on and her son Dexter is growing up, she's thinking, 'Oh! I haven't got anybody'. So when she realises that Billy fancies her, she thinks, 'Why not? Let's just see what happens!'" However, she believed that a romance between the pair would not work as she believed that the two characters would not "gel" due to Billy being a "kind of a loser" despite being "sweet and lovable" and Ava being a teacher. Months later, Billy and Ava have a date which gets to a "promising start". When Ava tells Billy that she admires his closeness with his granddaughter Lola Pearce (Danielle Harold), he tells her that he is trying to make up for lost time, and this reminds Ava of Sam. This sours the date as Billy realises that Ava is not over Sam. Ava then tries to rekindle the date by kissing Billy.

In April 2013, it was announced that Cornell John had been cast as Sam James, Ava's former husband and Dexter's father. In the character's fictional backstory, Sam left Ava a little after she gave birth to Dexter, when he went to buy milk and never returned. It was reported that Ava and Dexter would be "shocked" when Sam returns after the death of his father and that he wants to get to know Dexter. EastEnders executive producer Lorraine Newman said that Dexter's introduction would create a "solid family unit" with Ava and Dexter, though she teased, "after such a long absence, sparks are sure to initially fly. Let's just hope he's got the milk!" Sam's BBC profile revealed that Sam was genuinely in love with Ava and "showered" her and Dexter with love in his backstory, but he left when he could no longer cope with the "mundane nature of everyday life". The BBC profile also revealed that Sam got involved with many women, but he never got the same "deep connection" that he shared with Ava.

Sam first appeared on 14 May of that year, where he leaves Ava "shellshocked" when she sees him on her doorstep "out of the blue". Sam explains that he has been reflecting on his life after the death of his father and wants to build a relationship with Dexter, but Ava is not keen on the idea and warns him to stay away. When Dexter meets Sam, Ava lies that he is a family friend and Dexter is won over by him and believes that he is a better match for his mother than Billy is, not knowing that Sam is his father. Dexter tries to matchmake Ava and Sam, which makes Ava angry and leads to an argument. Dexter then figures out that Sam is his father and is angry at Ava for lying to him. Dexter tells Sam that he does not want to reconcile and this upsets Sam and he seeks comfort in Ava, which leads to the pair having sex. The following day, Ava is "lost for words" when Sam reveals that he will be staying in Walford as he believes that their night together was "too amazing". Sam and Ava then reignite their relationship, which Ava enjoys. Perkins told Inside Soap that she was not optimistic about the reconciliation and believed that Ava should not be with him, saying, "If that were me, it wouldn't be all that easy to walk back into my life. Sam didn't even call or email - he literally just turned up on the doorstep after walking out on her two decades ago! If I were Ava's friend, I'd say she was crazy to forgive him like that. There's bound to be some kind of upset - something else is going to happen, isn't it?". Perkins added that she would never let a man like Sam into her life as ""He walked out on Ava when their baby was three months old - and then had the cheek to knock on the door 20 years later". Cora and Ava later clash when Cora tries to get Ava to tell Dexter about her new relationship with Sam. Perkins called the ongoing relationship between Ava and Cora "nice" but believed that it was "ridiculous" that they were "playing this cat-and-mouse game, with one of them being nice, and the other refusing the invitation and pretending that they're not bothered" whilst bothering living in Albert Square. Perkins believed that it was unhealthy for the pair to not explore their "many issues" and wanted to see their relationship "blossoming".

In September 2013, Ava is upset when Sam does not show up for their date and believes that he has left again; however, he eventually turns up and reveals that he has been diagnosed with a worrying health issue. Although she thinks that he should be honest, Sam persuaded Ava to not Dexter, but their son senses the tension and believes that they are going to split up. Sam reassures Dexter that he and Ava are "solid", but he later collapses when playing football, and he admits that he urgently needs a kidney transplant as his are damaged. Ava is "heartbroken" to find out that she cannot donate her kidney to Sam as she is not a match, and Dexter shocks his parents when he vows to donate a kidney instead, having gotten himself tested without Ava knowing; Ava does not want Dexter to do this as her "worst fear" is losing both him and Sam, and Dexter initially respects her wishes but later finds out that he is a match. Perkins told Inside Soap that she related to Ava's reservations, saying, "For me there would be no contest - I'd be like Ava and say, 'No way are you having his kidney!' Transplants aren't easy things, even if everyone thinks they are.". Dexter ends up donating his kidney to Sam, and although Dexter initially loses consciousness after the operation, the father and son both make a full recovery.

=== Departure ===
In September 2013, it was announced that both Perkins and John would be leaving EastEnders. This was reported on the same day that it was announced that new executive producer Dominic Treadwell-Collins would be writing off four other characters; however, it was reported that Ava and Sam were always intended to depart at the conclusion of the Hartmans' transplant storyline and that Treadwell-Collins was continuing the story "as it was originally mapped out" several months ago and that their departures were not part of the cast "culling". It was also reported that Dexter would remain on the soap despite the departure of his parents. A BBC spokesperson confirmed that John and Perkins would be leaving the soap and wished them the best.

In November 2013, Sam considers fleeing Walford as he finds his new life with Ava too much to cope with. It becomes clear that Sam is beginning to feel trapped again and he lies to Ava that he has a special day for her birthday planned; Ava and Dexter are worried when he is late to her birthday lunch, but he shows up with flowers, although he struggles to hide his "look of suffocation" when Ava talks about their future and panics when Ava suggests going on a family holiday. Sam offers to buy milk and takes his passport and medicine with him and debates whether to leave when he is at the tube station, and Ava worries about his whereabouts.

At Dexter's birthday party, Ava gets a "nasty surprise" when a nurse at the party accidentally reveals that Sam has been on the transplant list since March, two months before he came to Walford. Realising that Sam has been lying to her since arriving and that he only tracked her down to get Dexter to donate his kidney, Ava asks Sam whether he really loves her after he insists that he stayed after the transplant due to her and Dexter meaning "the world to him"; however, the fact that he does not say yes to whether he loves her shows Ava there is no future in the relationship and so she orders him to leave. Sam refuses to leave Dexter, but when Dexter tells everyone at the party how thankful he is that Sam is back in his life, it becomes too much for Sam and he wants to run away. When Ava catches Sam about to leave, she gives him an ultimatum to either stay or to leave and never come back.

Sam ends up leaving the Square and Ava lies to Dexter, not wanting him to learn that Dexter abandoned him again. Ava claims that she told Sam to leave as she did not want to be with him anymore, which makes Dexter angry and he blames her for Sam's departure. This leads to Dexter moving in with Cora as he does not want to be around Ava. Ava is offered a job in Newcastle but rejects it as she wants to be there for Dexter. Dexter then tracks down Sam after stealing his address from Ava's bag and he finds out the truth, leading to Dexter wanting to make amends for how he treated his mother. Dexter feels more guilty when Cora tells him that Ava gave up a job opportunity to be there for him and so he contacts the job to tell them that Ava has reconsidered. Ava then plans to leave Walford with Dexter, but at the last minute she tells him to stay in Walford with his friends. Ava's departure aired on 17 December 2013, where she departs Walford for her new job in Newcastle.

== Storylines ==
When Tanya Branning (Jo Joyner) finds a birth certificate revealing that her mother Cora Cross (Ann Mitchell) had another daughter that she knew never knew about, Cora tells her that the baby, Ava Anderton, died shortly after birth. However, she later reveals to Patrick Trueman (Rudolph Walker) that this was a lie and she was actually forced to put her up for adoption. Patrick tells Tanya and they track Ava down at the school that she is deputy headteacher of, despite Patrick advising Tanya that Cora would not want this. When Tanya meets Cora, she is surprised to learn that she is mixed race and she lies to Ava that she is looking for a school for her son, Oscar Branning (Neo Hall). Tanya runs out and leaves her purse. Ava returns the purse to Tanya's house the next day and Cora invites her in for tea and is shocked when she finds out her name. Ava learns the truth and they have a long talk, where Ava explains that she considered finding Cora before but decided that the past was best left in the past and she leaves. A few weeks later, Cora gives Ava a Christmas card and a bracelet from Ava's father, and Ava gives her a Christmas card in return and wears the bracelet.

Tanya's daughter, Abi Branning (Lorna Fitzgerald), befriends Dexter Hartman (Khali Best) and he comes for dinner with her family. Ava arrives to the dinner and tells a clueless Tanya off for meddling, and it is revealed that Dexter is Ava's son. Ava then gets a job at a school in Walford, where Tanya and Cora live. Ava helps Liam Butcher (James Forde) with a gang that Dexter used to be part of. She and Dexter move to Walford when the gang trashes their home. Dexter urges Ava to start a relationship with Cora, despite Ava not wanting to, and she begins a friendship with Billy Mitchell (Perry Fenwick), who is interested in her romantically. They have a date, but this is interrupted by Sam James (Cornell John), Dexter's father and Ava's ex-husband that walked out on them 20 years prior. Ava and Dexter want him to leave but Ava ends up having sex with him and, realising she still has feelings for him, they reignite their relationship. Sam stays in Walford and Dexter begins to warm to Sam.

Ava finds out that Sam urgently requires a kidney transplant and wants to donate one of hers but she is not a match. Dexter wants to test to see if he is a match but Ava does not let him, but he does so anyway and is found to be a match. Dexter goes through the transplant and both he and Sam have a full recovery. Ava fusses over both of them whilst they're recovering, which makes Sam feel smothered. Ava is furious when she finds out that Sam only came to Walford to get Dexter's kidney. She throws him out but does not tell Dexter the reason why, leading to him moving with Cora as he blames her for his father's disappearance. Ava is offered a job in Newcastle and despite Cora encouraging her to take it, Ava rejects it. Dexter finds out the truth about Sam and emails the company pretending to be Ava and accepts the job. Ava agrees to go but decides that Dexter should stay as he has his own life in Walford. Ava thanks Cora and calls her "mum" and she then departs Walford.

== Reception ==
Ava's debut episode was watched by 7.71 million viewers (33.5%), making it the most watched British soap opera of that day. The BBC Three screening of the episode drew in 544,000 viewers (3.6%). Digital Spy chose Ava meeting Cora for the first time as their Picture of the Day. Daniel Kilkelly from that website had previously called the discovery of Cora having another baby "shocking". David Brown from Radio Times believed that Ava and Billy had a "blossoming relationship" and that their first date had a positive start but that Ava being reminded of Sam "put a dampener" on the date. Daniel Kilkelly from Digital Spy also called it a "blossoming relationship" but opined that being reminded of Sam made the date "awkward". Kilkelly believed that it was not surprising that Ava was shocked to see Sam again due to him leaving her when Dexter was a baby. Kilkelly also believed that Ava was trying to spare Dexter from "unnecessary heartache" by not telling him the truth about Sam's 2013 departure. Victoria Garo-Falides from the Daily Mirror called the arguing between Ava and Sam about Dexter donating his kidney "lots of shouty, budget-Morgan-Freeman-style acting" and questioned whether anyone cared about what happens to their family unit. Speaking of Ava's planned departure, Stuart Heritage from The Guardian opined that it was a "good thing" as he believed Ava and the other characters that had been written out had not "really made a dent" and deserved to be "binned".
