= Cora Cross =

Fictional character from EastEnders

- EastEnders character
- Portrayed by: Ann Mitchell
- Duration: 2011–2015, 2017–2018, 2026
- First appearance: Episode 4192; 11 April 2011
- Last appearance: Episode 7294; 16 March 2026
- Introduced by: Bryan Kirkwood (2011); Sean O'Connor (2017); John Yorke (2018); Ben Wadey (2026)
- Spin-off appearances: Lauren's Diaries (2011)
In-universe information
- Occupation: Charity shop manager; Launderette assistant; Food bank volunteer
- Husband: Bill Cross (backstory)
- Daughters: Ava Hartman; Rainie Cross; Tanya Branning
- Grandsons: Dexter Hartman; Oscar Branning; Roland Highway (adoptive)
- Granddaughters: Lauren Branning; Abi Branning
- Other relatives: Louie Beale; Jimmy Beale; AJ Branning

Cora Cross is a fictional character from the BBC soap opera EastEnders, played by Ann Mitchell. Cora is the mother of Tanya Branning (Jo Joyner), Rainie Cross (Tanya Franks) and Ava Hartman (Claire Perkins) and the grandmother of Lauren (Jacqueline Jossa), Abi (Lorna Fitzgerald), and Oscar Branning (Neo and Charlee Hall/Pierre Counihan-Moullier) as well as Dexter Hartman (Khali Best). Cora initially appeared from 11 to 15 April 2011, and returned as a regular character on 28 July. Cora is described as having "a brash, outspoken attitude and does not care who she offends", deemed "an archetypal East End matriarch" and Inside Soap says that Cora is a "brash, loud lady who likes to tell everyone what she thinks and has absolutely no shame."

In May 2011, when it was confirmed that Cora would be returning to EastEnders, executive producer Bryan Kirkwood said, "We all love Cora here—actress Ann Mitchell could be one of the Walford greats". Kirkwood was keen to find a new matriarch for the show after the departure of Peggy Mitchell (Barbara Windsor) and explained that Cora is a perfect fit. Kate White of Inside Soap praised Cora and added she could watch Ann Mitchell acting "her socks off" all day long.

Mitchell took a break from the show between April and July 2015, returning for various guest stints until 15 December the same year, when she departed. It was confirmed that Mitchell was on a temporary year-long break from the serial although Cora did not return in 2016. It was announced in March 2017 that Mitchell would reprise the role and Cora returned for two appearances on 18 and 19 May. She made several further appearances until 16 February 2018, followed by two further return stints that July and November. Mitchell made an unannounced one off return to the show on 16 March 2026.

== Character creation ==
=== Casting ===
Cora and her casting were announced on 21 March 2011. It was announced that award-winning actress, Ann Mitchell would be playing the role. Mitchell said of her casting "As a lifelong fan of EastEnders, I am thrilled to join the cast. I am a great fan of June Brown's [who plays Dot Branning] and am looking forward to sharing some scenes with her." Executive producer Bryan Kirkwood opined: "I'm very excited to have the much-loved Ann Mitchell joining us. Cora Cross is a formidable woman, cut from the same cloth as many glorious Walford women of the past, and Ann Mitchell is just perfect for the role." It is Mitchell's second role in EastEnders, having previously played Jane Williams from 2001 to 2002. Cora initially appeared from 11 to 15 April 2011. On 31 May 2011, it was confirmed that Cora would be returning to EastEnders as a regular character. Kirkwood said, "We all love Cora here—actress Ann Mitchell could be one of the Walford greats. She'll be returning late in the summer and is here to stay." Kirkwood added that he was keen to establish the Cross women. Mitchell was originally a guest artiste, appearing from 11 April to 15 April but was brought back as a regular character as of 28 July 2011.

In an interview with Inside Soap, the executive producer of EastEnders, Bryan Kirkwood commented: "With the loss of Barbara Windsor, I was keen to find a new matriarch for the show, and Ann Mitchell is a dream booking. I've always been a fan of her work, and with the storyline we've got planned, we'll wonder how we ever did without Cora". Discussing the permanent return of Cora, Tanya Franks commented: "Ann Mitchell isn't that scary in real life! It'll be nice to see these three crazy women as a family unit. There's room for lots more skeletons to fall out of the closet."

=== Personality ===
Cora was described as having "a brash, outspoken attitude and does not care who she offends. She also quickly puts Tanya under scrutiny, believing that success has turned her into a snob". It was said that she secretly wants to heal the rift between Tanya and Rainie. Cora has also been described as a "bolshie battleaxe". The BBC website describes Cora as "tough as old boots" and to "cross her at your peril." It continues to read: "Outwardly, Cora’s tough as old boots and doesn’t give a stuff what people think of her. But underneath all her bling and hair dye there is a sadness to her. She’s lonely, and wishes she had a relationship with her daughters Tanya and Rainie. Unpredictable Cora has lived on an estate all her life. She’s never really had any money and finds it impossible to hold down a job. Even though she’s always skint, she does enjoy the finer things in life. She’s a fan of gold, and her big earrings may even outshine some of Pat's. This lary lady won’t back down from an argument and holds life long grudges. Cross Cora at your peril!"

"Cora likes the high life. She likes to get out, have a drink and a sing-song, tell a few stories – and maybe dole out a few home truths when someone needs taking down a peg or two. But though Cora likes to cut people down to size, she has been less than exemplary in her own life. Although relationship-building generally comes second to sticking her beak in where it's not wanted and offering unwanted advice, she is fiercely defensive of her family and only wants the best for them. If a fight breaks out, this is a lady you want on her side."

— A description of Cora Cross from the BBC (2012)

Inside Soap says that Cora is a "brash, loud lady who likes to tell everyone what she thinks and has absolute no shame." An EastEnders informant says: "She'll be a massive embarrassment to Tanya, who likes to think she's risen above her roots and made a better life for herself. While Cora will be pretty impressed with Tanya's lot, she'll be quick to accuse her daughter of becoming snobby and stuck-up. That'll lead to plenty of drama and lots of comedy." Mitchell said that Cora has a "gutsy spirit" and "thick skin".

== Development ==
In an interview with Digital Spy, Jake Wood was asked what kind of a dynamic he thinks that viewers could expect from Max and Cora. He replied: "If Max does move back home, they'd potentially have to spend a lot of time together, so I think they'd have to put their differences aside for Tanya's sake. Ann Mitchell is a superb actor and Cora is a great character – a great addition to the show. I'm very happy that she's here." Also in an interview with Digital Spy, Jo Joyner commented on the relationship between Tanya and Cora at present. She said: "I think that now we've explored all of the history with Tanya's father, the two of them are in a new territory. Cora can sometimes be distant and cold, but you have to remember that they hadn't spoken for a long time. At the moment, because of Tanya's illness, Cora is being supportive and quite 'mummy' – but there's always the possibility that things could take a turn for the worse with their relationship, so I think that could change." Joyner later added: "There's some really great stuff to come with Max, Cora and Tanya and her past. It all comes to a bit of a head."

In October 2011, Daniel Kilkelly of Digital Spy reported that Max would be returning to EastEnders with his brother Derek (Jamie Foreman) and teased that Tanya will reveal a long-held family secret which will shock Cora. Tanya reveals to Cora and Rainie that she helped her father to die. Joyner stated that particularly enjoyed filming the scene where Tanya reveals the truth about her father's death. Rudolph Walker revealed in July 2012 that Cora and Patrick Trueman are to embark on a fling with each other. Upon Tanya discovering that Cora had another daughter, Mitchell said that many twists and turns will follow. She added: "The whole situation has pierced her thick skin."

=== Ava Hartman ===
In September 2012, Kilkelly reported that Tanya would discover Cora has been keeping a secret from her for years. Tanya discovers that Cora once had a daughter by the name of Ava, after coming across a birth certificate by accident. Tanya questions Cora, but she remains secretive and refuses to talk to her daughter. Cora later opens up to Tanya and tells that her daughter was called Ava, but that she died shortly after birth. It was later announced that Ava would be introduced to the show and that actress Claire Perkins had been cast in the role. Mitchell said that Cora was "forced to give up Ava" adding "The baby's father was black and he left Cora before he knew she was pregnant. She was 18 and unmarried, and at that time, having a baby in her situation was a social stigma. She was made to feel enormous shame by her parents, who forced her to give the baby up for adoption." On the subject of Cora keeping the secret for a significant amount of time, Mitchell also said that it's down to guilt and wanting things to be kept safe and uncomplicated. Mitchell added "It's going to be mayhem. The implications will be huge. The family will want answers, and I'm sure we won't be seeing the back of Ava."

=== Departure and return ===
Mitchell took a break from the show in April 2015 and returned on a recurring basis for five months from July to December 2015. It was reported that she would make a full return after a year, however the character did not return by the end of 2016. In March 2017, it was announced she would be returning, which she did on 18 and 19 May, and again on 23 June. She returned again on 10 August.

Mitchell reprised her role as Cora once again by making an unannounced return to the show on 16 March 2026.

== Storylines ==
Cora turns up at her daughter Tanya Branning's (Jo Joyner) house unannounced, revealing that Tanya's fiancé Greg Jessop (Stefan Booth) invited her to their wedding against Tanya's wishes. Cora's other daughter, Rainie Cross (Tanya Franks), also arrives at Tanya's house, which Tanya is initially unhappy about, but Cora vouches for her by promising that she is now clean from drugs and explains that Rainie's counsellor thinks she should reconnect with her family. Cora returns months after the wedding as she can no longer handle her abusive neighbours and asks to stay with Tanya for a few days. Tanya lets her stay longer and Cora eventually reveals she has been evicted from her home because her neighbour has an ASBO, but when Cora, Tanya and Rainie return there to empty the house, the neighbour reveals that Cora is the one with the ASBO. Eventually, Cora is forced to move out of Tanya's and convinces Dot Branning (June Brown) to let her stay with her and sister Rose Cotton (Polly Perkins). Dot later kicks Cora out for laughing at her and using language that Dot dislikes. Cora arrives at Tanya's house just as Shirley Carter (Linda Henry) is throttling Rainie, so Cora fends Shirley off and threatens her. Tanya then lets Cora stay with her. After Tanya reveals that she has cervical cancer, Cora vows to support Tanya through her illness. Cora starts voluntary work at a cancer charity shop, where she is quickly promoted to manager. Cora also returns to live with Dot and Rose.

Cora pretends to be in a relationship with Patrick Trueman (Rudolph Walker) at a funeral of one of his old friends, but they then decide to start a real relationship, taking it slowly. Tanya discovers a birth certificate for a sister she knew nothing about, Ava Anderton (Clare Perkins). Cora refuses to discuss the matter, until later, when she burns the birth certificate and tells Tanya that Ava died shortly after birth. When Patrick questions Cora about a cake she is baking, she tells him it is for Ava's birthday, she is in fact alive and she was forced to give her up for adoption by her parents because she was unmarried and the baby was mixed race. Her erratic behaviour continues and she is subsequently fired from the charity shop. Patrick reveals to Tanya that Ava is alive, so Tanya tracks her down. Tanya is shocked to discover that Ava is mixed-race and decides to leave things. However, she leaves her purse behind, and Ava returns it to Tanya's home, where Cora is horrified when she introduces herself by her name. Cora then speaks to Ava, who has many questions. Cora angrily ends her relationship with Patrick due to him telling Tanya about Ava.

Cora befriends her grandson, Ava's son Dexter Hartman (Khali Best), who helps to bring Cora and Ava closer. When Dexter's father Sam James (Cornell John) arrives, he tries to win Cora over, but she sees that Ava and Dexter are upset and warns him off. Ava and Sam reunite, and Cora eventually tells Dexter, who is initially angry but comes to terms with the relationship. Cora's granddaughter Abi Branning (Lorna Fitzgerald) and Kim Fox (Tameka Empson) plot to get Cora and Patrick back together, locking them in a shed. Patrick ends his friendship with Betty and resumes a relationship with Cora. Cora supports her granddaughters when Max is in prison for attempted murder, but following his release from prison and separation from his third wife Kirsty Branning (Kierston Wareing), he buys 5 Albert Square, and throws Cora and Dexter out. They move in with Patrick, but he ends his relationship with Cora due to her insensitive comments that she makes to Dot following the death of her son Nick Cotton (John Altman). He tells her that she and Dexter have one month to find somewhere else. Cora steals money from the laundrette to rent a flat, but after Dot finds her stealing money from the washing machines, Cora loses hope until Stan Carter (Timothy West) agrees to give her some cash. Cora and Dexter later move into a flat together.

Cora and Stan start dating and Stan, who has terminal prostate cancer, decides he wants to commit the time he has left with her. However, they soon break up. Stan collapses due to his cancer spreading, leaving him paralysed from the waist down. After much hesitation, Cora visits Stan in hospital to say goodbye to him. Stan dies from his cancer, devastating Cora. After his funeral, Cora departs, saying she will stay with Tanya in Exeter. A few months later, a dishevelled Cora attends a charity drive for the homeless at the community centre, but ensures nobody sees her. Abi discovers Cora has not visited Tanya and attempts to find her. Cora is found sleeping rough in a bus shelter and at first does not recognise Abi, however, she soon returns to Walford and lives in an allotment shed and in alleyways until she is found a house.

Two years later, when Denise Fox (Diane Parish) is referred to a food bank, she finds Cora is volunteering there so leaves. Cora persuades Denise to get some food and explains to Denise that when she first used the food bank, she was abusive, but it helped her. She returns to the Square later in the year in order to meet her granddaughter Lauren Branning’s (Jacqueline Jossa) fiancé, Steven Beale (Aaron Sidwell) and senses Lauren isn’t entirely happy in her relationship, telling her she knows she will make the right decision in the end. She also observes Max and realises he is involved in something dodgy. She returns again later in the year after Denise phones her to inform her Max was involved in plans to redevelop the Square, informing him that she has spoken to Tanya and that her grandson Oscar Branning (Charlee Hall) will no longer be visiting as planned due to Max’s actions.

After her granddaughters, Abi and Lauren, fall off the roof of The Queen Victoria public house, Cora visits Abi in hospital and slaps Max, blaming him for the accident. She learns that Abi is brainstem dead and will never recover. Abi is pregnant and the baby is delivered and survives. Cora is present when Abi's life support is turned off and she peacefully dies. On the day of Abi's funeral, Cora tells Max to stay away as he has damaged the family, and afterwards, she drives Tanya home. Max then names the baby Abi Branning, but Cora receives temporary custody of her. Max marries Rainie as part of a scam to gain custody of Abi, and a battle between them and Cora ensues. Cora visits with Abi one day and allows Rainie and Max to look after her overnight. Cora then offers Rainie the chance to leave Max and move to Exeter to run a tea shop and bring up Abi with Cora and Tanya. Rainie asks Cora for more, and gets her to write a cheque for £50,000, which Rainie shows to Max, saying she is turning it down as she wants to bring up Abi with Max. Rainie then calls social services and reveals Cora's bribe to them. Rainie slaps Cora when she insults her in the pub, so Cora punches Rainie in the face. When Rainie tries to apologise later, Cora accuses Rainie of trying to abduct Abi and knocks her unconscious with a frying pan. The police then arrive to put Abi into temporary care.

In December 2022, when Lauren returns for Dot's funeral, she reveals that Cora is unable to attend due to a recent hip operation, and is sad to be missing the funeral.

In March 2026, Lauren's husband, Peter Beale (Thomas Law) invites Tanya to surprise Lauren for Mother's Day, but Cora shows up instead, revealing Tanya can't make it. Lauren is happy to see Cora but Max is angered. Cora aggravates Max at the dining table so he leaves. Later, Cora realises that Lauren is nervous about Mark Fowler's (Stephen Aaron-Sipple) offer to sell cars, as she was recently attacked while out for a test drive. In private, Cora encourages Lauren to remain confident and make a success of the business. Before leaving, Cora also makes amends with Oscar (now Pierre Counihan-Moullier), from whom she became estranged.

== Reception ==
Speaking of Cora's arrival, Jane Simon of the Daily Mirror said "Tanya's mum Cora provides a stark warning about the dangers of Botox. She turns up tonight looking like Ronald McDonald in drag – no wonder Tanya's been avoiding her." Daniel Kilkelly from Digital Spy said of Cora's guest stint, "During her brief stay on Albert Square, Cora quickly became known for her brash attitude and outspoken ways." Kate Woodward from Inside Soap said the introduction of Cora and Sylvia Goodwin (Stephanie Cole) from Coronation Street proved that soap operas need more "outspoken older women". She commented that the characters cannot resist a barb and say the things many people would not; just like "famous battleaxe" Blanche Hunt (Maggie Jones). Cora and Sylvia have the "edge" that cannot be achieved by younger characters. Woodward described Cora as rough and that she owned a "gob as scary as her slap-plastered mug". Woodward later said that "outrageous Rose is the perfect foil for caustic Cora". She named them as "the best double-act ever" and added that they deserved a whole episode dedicated to them.

Kate White from the publication later praised the character saying "All hail the new queen of soap—fabulous Cora is everything the discerning viewer could ever want." White added she could watch Mitchell acting "her socks off" all day long. The writer later said that Cora has the "undisputed title of The Biggest Hair In Soap". Michael Cregan of Inside Soap said that Cora has "proved that she isn't a woman to be messed with". He also admitted that "it was a real surprise" to see Cora's vulnerable side as she listened to the truth of her husband's supposed "peaceful death". He added that it is clear that viewers still have a lot to learn about Cora. In October 2011, Inside Soap readers voted Cora their "favourite soap battleaxe" over Sylvia Goodwin (Stephanie Cole) and Edna Birch (Shirley Stelfox). Kevin O'Sullivan of the Daily Mirror rated one of Cora's lines his favourite. Cora said "I used to be able to walk down the street and stop traffic." O'Sullivan replied: "So she was a lollipop lady." In Heat, Julie Emery called Cora "a bouffanted harridan of a mother". Simon of the Daily Mirror later hinted that "Cora has a real soft spot for bad boy Derek Branning." A writer for the Daily Mirror called Rose Cotton (Polly Perkins), Patrick Trueman (Rudolph Walker) and Cora "diamond geezers". Mitchell revealed in July 2012 that she was shocked to see that Cora has a young fanbase. She added that it is very interesting as people seem to believe there is great division between young and old people, and that youngsters respond to her because she is a tough mother and grandmother. A writer for Press Association called Cora a "larger-than-life pensioner". Mitchell received a nomination in the "Funniest Female" category at the 2012 Inside Soap Awards for her portrayal of Cora. Upon receiving the nomination, Mitchell commented "I'm chuffed to be nominated for this award, Cora's sense of humour is so dry. I love her. She's so much fun to play!"
