= Tanya Branning =

Fictional character from EastEnders

- EastEnders character
- Portrayed by: Jo Joyner
- Duration: 2006–2013, 2015, 2017–2018
- First appearance: Episode 3177; 27 June 2006
- Last appearance: Episode 5657; 16 February 2018
- Created by: Simon Ashdown
- Introduced by: Kate Harwood (2006); Dominic Treadwell-Collins (2015); John Yorke (2017)
- Spin-off appearances: EastEnders: E20 (2010)
In-universe information
- Other names: Tanya Cross; Tanya Jessop
- Occupation: Beautician; Businesswoman; Salon owner
- Family: Branning
- Father: Bill Cross
- Mother: Cora Cross
- Sisters: Rainie Cross
- Half-sisters: Ava Hartman
- Husband: Max Branning (1994–2010); Greg Jessop (2011–2012)
- Sons: Oscar Branning
- Daughters: Lauren Branning; Abi Branning
- Stepsons: Bradley Branning
- Grandsons: Louie Beale; Jimmy Beale
- Granddaughters: AJ Branning
- Nephews: Dexter Hartman; Roland Highway (adoptive)

Tanya Branning (also Cross and Jessop) is a fictional character from the BBC soap opera EastEnders, played by Jo Joyner. She made her first appearance on 27 June 2006. Joyner left the show temporarily on 25 December 2009 for maternity leave. Following a guest appearance, Tanya eventually returned on 27 September 2010. On 1 April 2013, it was announced that Joyner would be departing the role and she made her final appearance on 28 June 2013. Tanya returned in February 2015 for two episodes as part of the show's 30th anniversary celebrations. Joyner made a surprise return to the role of Tanya for two episodes on 25 and 26 December 2017. She made two further appearances on 19 January 2018 and 16 February 2018, coinciding with the exits of her daughters Lauren (Jacqueline Jossa) and Abi (Lorna Fitzgerald), and Abi's death.

Tanya's storylines have included opening her own salon, giving birth to her third child, Oscar), discovering her husband Max Branning (Jake Wood) had an affair with Stacey Slater (Lacey Turner) before divorcing and then burying him alive with the help from her new partner Sean Slater (Robert Kazinsky), marrying Greg Jessop (Stefan Booth), starting an affair with Max on her wedding day to Greg, dealing with her eldest daughter Lauren's alcoholism, battling cervical cancer, discovering that Max has a secret wife, Kirsty Branning (Kierston Wareing) on their second wedding day, witnessing her daughters Lauren and Abi fall from the roof of The Queen Victoria public house and subsequently dealing with Abi's death, which leads to her suffering a mental breakdown.

== Creation and development ==
=== Casting ===
In early reports of the character's arrival, her name was spelt Tania. This was later changed on the official BBC website. Joyner originally turned down the role as she had doubts over whether she could work in a soap opera. She said "It was a massive decision. I said no originally. Playing someone in a soap is a big responsibility. People are very protective of the soap and if you are rubbish you can't get away from it." Also, having worked quietly and successfully in the industry for eight years, Joyner was unsure if she would be comfortable with the level of fame being on EastEnders would bring her. During the affair storyline between Stacey Slater (Lacey Turner) and Tanya's husband Max (Jake Wood), Joyner did not read any parts of the EastEnders scripts other than her own, as she felt her acting was improved by not knowing what Max did behind Tanya's back, and because she felt that she could better justify to herself why Tanya would not suspect Max of cheating if she in reality did not know what he was getting up to. After she began appearing in the show as Linda Carter, it was revealed that Kellie Bright had auditioned for the role of Tanya.

=== Characterisation ===
"I have to say actually, I do prefer playing a sort of tarty, nasty bitch, because quite frankly it's more fun. I do love playing Tanya, but it is very different to the roles I had before EastEnders. I'd like to see a bit more of her feisty side."

— Jo Joyner

In a July 2008 interview with The Sunday People, Joyner revealed that she was disappointed that Tanya's wild child past had not been explored more in the aftermath of her character burying Max alive, saying "I didn't think Tanya would be as mumsy at first. She was quite hard in her past and it would have been fun to have that side come out. Tanya has a really naughty side. When she was young she was a lot like Stacey Slater. That hasn't really come out yet but she definitely has it in her." Joyner temporarily left the show in December 2009 for maternity leave. Her departure was facilitated through a storyline in which Max hid financial problems from the family and Tanya left him. The show's executive producer Diederick Santer revealed that some planned storyline material for Max and Tanya was put on hold until Joyner's return from maternity leave. On 6 May 2010, Joyner filmed a single episode that was broadcast on 23 June, and she made her full-time return on 27 September 2010.

Family is paramount to Tanya. Max was the love of her life, but his affair with Stacey destroyed their marriage, and nearly destroyed her. Though she's had dalliances with Sean Slater, Jack Branning and even went up the aisle with Greg Jessop, it's Max she always goes back to. Tanya may be one of Walford's most loving mums, but she also has a wild side. So she's wise to any and all of the tricks pulled by her rebellious daughter, Lauren – she pulled them herself when she was the same age.

— Description of Tanya on the BBC Website (2012)

In an interview with Digital Spy, Joyner admitted that she prefers playing a "feisty" character and would like to explore that side of Tanya. Joyner confirmed that she wants sparks to fly between her character and estranged husband Max. She added: "I hope it comes out. I think she's been a little bit calm and a little bit mumsy lately and I think if she's been away from Max for a while, she needs to come back with a bit more fight about her and have him on his knees a bit." Of her experiences as a mother, she added: "It's fantastic. It's full on but it's just been a whirlwind. I've just been so lucky."

On 21 March 2008, Joyner revealed a script in which Tanya would bury Max alive. Speaking of when she first heard about the burial idea, the actress admitted: "I actually was really upset! I heard about the theory and I thought 'how are you going to get me there? She's not a killer!" "I did always say to Diederick [Santer] when this happened that as far as I was concerned, the only way she can kill Max is when she finds out on Christmas Eve in a blind fit of rage – that's the only time when she could be a murderer." In February 2011, it was announced that filming had started on location for Greg and Tanya's wedding in April 2011. However, at the time it was unconfirmed whether they would actually marry, meaning that the couple's future would hang in the balance until the time of broadcast. Digital Spy reported that Tanya would flee the wedding to help Max and Abi when they are hurt in a serious accident, though they said that Tanya and Greg may have already exchanged vows.

Joyner revealed to What's on TV that she thinks that happy storylines are boring and that EastEnders needs depressing storylines to be dramatic. She added that Walford is a miserable place, which is part of the fun.

=== Cervical cancer ===
On 26 June 2011, it was announced by EastEnders that Tanya will feature in a cervical cancer storyline. Executive producer Bryan Kirkwood said that viewers will see Tanya receive the devastating news that she has cervical cancer. EastEnders has worked closely with experts in the field to ensure that the issue is accurately portrayed. Viewers will see how Tanya, a mother of three, will use her inner determination to deal with what will be one of the toughest challenges of her life. The director of Jo's Cervical Cancer trust Robert Music said that EastEnders must depict the disease accurately and responsibly saying "It's about educating the general public who perhaps aren't aware of the disease, but also with cervical cancer, there are thousands of women out there who have been diagnosed or are living with this." Music of added: "As the UK's only charity solely dedicated to informing and supporting women affected by cervical abnormalities and cervical cancer, we think it is fantastic that EastEnders has decided to highlight the issue of cervical cancer." "This is a disease that affects thousands of women and their loved ones in the UK every year, and for many can be preventable by taking proactive steps, such as attending cervical screening when invited." Music added: "EastEnders have gone to great lengths to research this story with us and we hope that by showing this storyline to its millions of viewers, it will not only raise awareness of cervical cancer but also help the public to be more informed about this issue." Ellen Lang of Macmillan Cancer Support said that cervical cancer is diagnosed in thousands of women every year in the UK, so EastEnders is congratulated for tackling this difficult subject that affects many people.

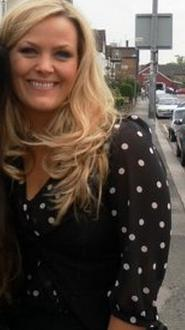
Ahead of Tanya's cervical cancer storyline, Jo Joyner (pictured) did research so she could portray the plot as realistic as she could.

Jo Joyner said that she will make sure that the storyline will be "honest and true to life" as possible. Talking to All About Soap about how she has researched the plot, Joyner said that she has talked to many survivors of cervical cancer through a charity named Jo's Trust and added that they have a great website, which is very informative and has helped her a lot. Joyner said that it is a privilege to be given any sort of serious storyline and a real responsibility. Asked whether it makes Tanya think twice who she wants to be with, Joyner replied: "Definitely. She remembers her mum looking at her dad with pity [when he was ill] and she'd hate that happening to her. She has some serious thinking to do about her future now." Jo's Cervical Cancer Trust has praised EastEnders for helping spread the awareness of cervical cancer. The trust received extra calls following Tanya's diagnosis. Kirkwood said in a news release that EastEnders worked closely with experts to ensure that the issue is accurately portrayed and that viewers will see how Tanya will use her inner determination to deal with what will be one of the toughest challenges of her life.

Music said that Joyner was "fantastic" when visiting the charity. He added that she was "really hungry to learn, to understand what the impact was, and she felt a responsibility to get this right" Joyner stated that she "feels grateful" to be in a cervical cancer storyline. She told Soaplife magazine: "It's a privilege to be given any sort of serious storyline and a real responsibility. I'm going to make it as honest and true to life as I possibly can. I will grab every chance I can to show Tanya dropping her guard." Speaking of her past, she added: "Tanya remembers her mum looking at her dad with pity and she'd hate that happening to her. Tanya's dad died of cancer and she nursed him through it. She's seen it first hand and therefore has a deep-seated fear of it."

Joyner said it's important to keep her cervical cancer storyline as realistic as possible. She said that viewers will see Tanya's appearance change as the storyline progresses. Asked whether Tanya will start to look ill, Joyner said to Soaplife: "I'd like her to and I made a point of saying, 'Unless we ever see Tanya looking tired these references are going to be rubbish', because she's keeping up the pretence and putting on lots of make-up. But I've had my extensions out and the false lashes are coming off. It will be a slow decline." Joyner later said that she does not become depressed over the cancer plot, saying she can switch off from the emotions instantly. Speaking to the Daily Star, Joyner said that rather than becoming depressed over the scenes, she goes home relieved that it's not her life. She added: "I go home and laugh even more hysterically than I would normally because of what's happening to Tanya. My husband doesn't agree. He thinks I carry it all more than I think I do. He says I come back miserable, but once I've put the kids in the bath and had a laugh, then I feel good again."

=== Departure (2013) ===
On 1 May 2012, it was reported that Joyner would take a prolonged break from the show at the end of her current contract, to spend time with her family, and an inside source stated that she "will definitely return". Joyner confirmed this herself, saying that the break would last six months, similar to other actors who took breaks in 2012, such as June Brown (Dot Branning) and Charlie Brooks (Janine Butcher). However, on 1 April 2013, it was announced that Joyner's departure would be indefinite as she wished to try new career paths. Speaking of this, Joyner said, "I love playing Tanya and being part of such a great show, but she has been on quite a rollercoaster over the past seven years and I have come to realise that it's right for her to step away from Walford for a bit longer than originally planned. I have been very fortunate to have been part of some fantastic storylines over the years, and I have worked with some wonderful people during my time on the show which I will always be very grateful for, but I feel that as a mother and an actress it is time for me to explore some other avenues for a while." Executive Producer Lorraine Newman stated that whilst Tanya will be missed, her exit will bring a new era to the Branning family but refused to say how Tanya will leave the show. Joyner filmed her final scenes on 15 May 2013, and Tanya departed the serial on 28 June.

=== Guest stints (2015–2018) ===
In December 2014 it was announced that Tanya would return in February 2015 for a few episodes, for Ian Beale (Adam Woodyatt) and Jane Beale’s (Laurie Brett) wedding and for the show's 30th anniversary. Tanya appears in the episode broadcast on 18 and 19 February. The episodes were shown live, and Joyner accidentally referred to Ian by his actor's name.

Joyner made an unannounced return on 25 December 2017 as part of Jossa and Fitzgerald's departures. Simon Ashdown, who created the character of Tanya, was invited back to write the Christmas Day episode and Joyner was approached by Ashdown and executive consultant, John Yorke. Joyner was initially nervous about going back due to her mistake in the live episodes, but knew she had to return when the story was pitched to her. The episodes were mainly filmed at night due to Joyner's other work commitments. Joyner then went on to appear in the episodes broadcast on 19 January 2018 and 16 February 2018 as part of her on-screen daughter Abi Branning's (Lorna Fitzgerald) death and funeral.

== Storylines ==
=== 2006–2013 ===
Tanya arrives in Albert Square after her husband Max Branning's (Jake Wood) car breaks down, not realising in fact Max is visiting his family. She finds out he had an affair with Gemma Clewes (Natalie J. Robb) but forgives him. To make it up to her, Max buys 10 Turpin Road for Tanya, which she turns into a beauty salon named Booty. Tanya, after much pressure from Max, gives birth to Oscar. Unbeknown to Tanya, Max has started an affair with Stacey Slater (Lacey Turner), who is Max's son Bradley Branning's (Charlie Clements) former girlfriend. When the affair is revealed on Christmas Day on a video recording recorded by Tanya and Max's daughter, Lauren Branning (Madeline Duggan/Jacqueline Jossa), Tanya asks for a divorce and starts a relationship with Stacey's brother Sean Slater (Robert Kazinsky). Tanya plots to bury Max alive and with the help of Sean, they drug Max and bury him in the woods. Tanya later feels guilty, digs him up and ends her relationship with Sean. Tanya then has to face her sister, Rainie (Tanya Franks), turning up as she did the year before, claiming she is clean of drugs, though she tests positive, so Tanya orders her to leave. Tanya then starts a relationship with Max's brother Jack Branning (Scott Maslen) and Max tries to split them up. Tanya and Max later share a kiss, after Max is abducted and beaten by Jack. Max is knocked down in a deliberate hit-and-run. Tanya admits to the police that she tried to kill Max; however, Lauren was the real culprit. After the police find out Lauren was the driver, Max and Tanya suffer a bumpy relationship, which ends up with Tanya forgiving Max and allowing him to move back in, but when she finds out they are in debt and Max has been hiding it, she leaves with Lauren and Oscar after finding out Booty was to close down, with daughter Abi Branning (Lorna Fitzgerald) refusing to go with Tanya and staying with Max.

Tanya returns to Walford with her new fiancé Greg Jessop (Stefan Booth). Tanya's mother, Cora Cross (Ann Mitchell), and Rainie arrive in Walford for her wedding, much to Tanya's dismay. Greg and Tanya marry, and Tanya soon starts an affair with Max. Greg later buys the beauty salon from Roxy Mitchell (Rita Simons) and later pushes Tanya to have another baby, though Tanya is against the idea. Tanya allows Rainie and Cora to move in. Tanya and Max plan to reveal their affair, but Tanya finds out that she may have cervical cancer. After discovering this, she breaks up with Max, but he decides to tell the truth to his fiancé, Vanessa Gold (Zöe Lucker) who reveals all to Greg. Heartbroken, Greg leaves Walford and when Max realises Tanya does not want to be with him either, he leaves too. Tanya is diagnosed with cervical cancer and tells only Lauren and forbids her from telling anyone else. Greg briefly returns but cannot handle the news that Tanya has cancer and quickly leaves again. Tanya then decides to stop her therapy, but does not tell Lauren about this. Later, Tanya agrees to allow Cora to move back in, after she has been thrown out by Dot Branning (June Brown). Tanya's doctor, Yusef Khan (Ace Bhatti), later confronts Tanya and asks why she has stopped her treatment. Tanya goes to the hospital where she tells her doctor that she wants no more treatment as she does not have the strength to fight, despite the fact she could die.

Max returns to Walford with his brother Derek Branning (Jamie Foreman). Max insults Tanya, and Tanya throws him out. As Tanya starts to throw her mother and sister out, Lauren reveals that Tanya has cancer and confronts her about stopping her therapy. Tanya then tells Cora and Rainie the truth about how her father died: he did not die peacefully as they believed, but was in constant pain and so Tanya helped him to die. Max then reconciles with Tanya and they become a couple again. She learns that she has been given the all-clear from cancer but is worried that it might return. She finds it difficult to be close to Max, but after a frank discussion over their marriage and sex life, Max reassures Tanya that she is all that matters to him. When Derek discovers that Tanya scared his daughter Alice Branning (Jasmyn Banks) away, he threatens to kill Tanya if she does it again. When Tanya discovers that cars at the car lot are being repossessed, she and Max argue, which leads to passion and they have sex for the first time since Tanya's all-clear from cancer. Tanya announces that her divorce from Greg will soon be finalised and proposes to Max. Lauren tells Tanya that Derek stole from Lucy Beale (Hetti Bywater) and she confronts him about it. Derek, in response, taunts Tanya about what he and Max did in Manchester. She confronts Max, who says he was involved in criminal dealings causing someone to get hurt. He then accepts her proposal from earlier and they get engaged.

Tanya discovers a birth certificate for a sister called Ava Anderton (Clare Perkins). She confronts Cora, who refuses to talk about it, but eventually tells Tanya that Ava died not long after her birth and it hurt so much she never told anyone, not even the father. Tanya then tells Cora that she can talk to her any time. When Ian Beale (Adam Woodyatt) goes missing, Tanya helps to bring him back to Walford, which makes her decide she wants Rainie at her wedding, but Cora lies to her that Rainie does not want to attend, when in fact Rainie does not want to see Cora. Patrick tells Tanya the truth about Ava: that she is alive, and Cora gave her up for adoption, so Tanya secretly tracks down Ava to her place of work, a school in Dalston. Tanya is shocked that Ava is mixed-race, and decides not to see her again. Tanya leaves her purse behind and Ava returns it, meeting Cora. Cora is shocked when Ava says her name, and is angry at Tanya, disowning her. Lauren is involved in a car crash and tells Tanya that she is in love with her cousin, Joey Branning (David Witts). Derek blackmails Tanya to keep Lauren and Joey's relationship secret from the rest of the family, and Joey is forced by Derek to end his relationship with Lauren. On Christmas Day, Tanya is stunned when Max's secret wife Kirsty Branning (Kierston Wareing) arrives moments before she is due to remarry Max. Max insists he thought they were divorced (Derek had lied to him) and Tanya and Max continue their relationship, but when Tanya finds Kirsty's keys in Max's pocket (given to Lauren by Kirsty), Tanya assumes Kirsty and Max are still involved. She tells Kirsty to sign divorce papers, but Kirsty refuses. Lauren also discovers that Tanya has not attended a hospital appointment, when Tanya said she was given the all-clear from cancer. Kirsty agrees to the divorce, realising she is hurting Max. Max shows Tanya this by saying Kirsty is leaving. Tanya realises Max still loves Kirsty because he refuses to have sex with her and is sad about Kirsty leaving. Max confirms this, so Tanya ejects Max from the house, saying their relationship is over for good, and she celebrates the break-up. She does not cope though, and is nearly drawn back to Max. She decides that to resist temptation she must leave Walford, and Max is deeply disappointed.

She returns a few weeks later to find Max, Kirsty, Abi and Lauren having a meal together and laughing. Lauren continues to drink, but Tanya refuses to believe she is addicted until she keeps Lauren in the house and she reveals that she has been sipping vodka from a water bottle. Tanya locks Lauren in the house but she escapes through the upstairs window. Later, Lauren gets drunk on a night out and leaves with a stranger; she does not return the next morning. Eventually, when she does come back, her skin and eyes are yellow and she collapses in pain. She is taken to hospital where Tanya and Max are told she is an alcoholic, has alcoholic hepatitis, and one more drink could kill her. The doctor suggests that the best treatment for Lauren is residential care. Later, Lauren tells her family that she cannot stand her parents' constant arguing, so Tanya decides to take Lauren, Abi and Oscar to Exeter, where Lauren can get help for her alcoholism. Abi refuses to leave, so Tanya leaves Walford with Lauren and Oscar in a taxi, after telling a heartbroken Max she will always love him. Lauren soon returns to Albert Square, but Tanya and Oscar remain in Exeter. In January 2014, Tanya's best friend, Jane Beale (Laurie Brett), reveals to Max that Tanya is now in a relationship with a man named Tim, and that they are planning on getting engaged.

=== 2015 ===
In February 2015, Tanya returns to Walford to attend Ian and Jane's wedding, and after the reception, she agrees to sit and have a conversation with Max. During the conversation, she reveals that she is taking part in a fashion course in Manchester and asks Max if Oscar can move in with him for a while, as he would be stuck with a nanny most of the time if he went with her, due to Tanya's commitment to the course. Tanya also explains her concerns about Abi's recent troubling behaviour leading to being accused of killing Lucy, and she and Max end up arguing over whether each other are to blame for this. Before leaving, Tanya admits that she was thinking of rebuilding her relationship with Max, but Jane assures her that that would have been one of the biggest mistakes of her life. Max is falsely accused of the murder of Lucy in July 2015 and after he is arrested, Oscar is sent back to live with Tanya, who denies Max any contact with his son, although Max is later released after Bobby Beale (Eliot Carrington) confesses to the crime.

When Cora visits Walford, she senses that Lauren does not love her fiancé Steven Beale (Aaron Sidwell) and questions whether he is controlling her. She then arranges for Lauren to visit Tanya for relationship advice. Later, Tanya agrees to let Max see Oscar for his birthday but Cora turns up instead and tells Max that she has told Tanya all about his work with Weyland & Co. and that she is not allowing Max to see Oscar.

=== 2017–2018 ===
Tanya returns on Christmas Day to take Lauren and Abi away from Walford, informing Ian and his mother, Kathy Beale (Gillian Taylforth), that Lauren is moving to Glasgow with her boyfriend, Josh Hemmings (Eddie Eyre). Tanya goes to collect Abi and confronts Max over his recent behaviour and is disgusted that Max and Stacey have resumed their affair. When Stacey defends Max, Tanya tells Stacey that Jane has told her that he killed Steven and tried to kill Jane. Abi overhears this and tells Lauren. As they prepare to leave, they see Max on the roof of The Queen Vic and Lauren and Abi attempt to talk him down. Max agrees to come down but Lauren and Abi slip and fall off the roof. Tanya accompanies them to the hospital, where Lauren undergoes surgery whilst Abi has a CT scan. Tanya initially accepts Max's comfort but then pushes him away. They are then told that whilst Lauren is expected to make a full recovery from her injuries, Abi has suffered critical brain damage and remains in a coma. Tanya is devastated and leaves the hospital in tears. A few days later, she plans to visit Lauren and Abi with Cora, but Cora comes alone and slaps Max, blaming him for his daughters' injuries. She later apologises to Max before learning that Abi is brain-dead and that she will never recover. Tanya avoids being around Max in the hospital and when Abi's life support is due to be withdrawn, Max asks if it can be withdrawn at Abi's time of birth. Cora tells Max that Tanya does not want him present. Max finds Tanya in the hospital's chapel, who is angry with Max that Abi has to die because of him, and agrees to stay away. At the last minute, however, Tanya requests Max to be there when the life support is withdrawn.

Before Abi's funeral, Tanya's friends talk about her being unable to attend the funeral as she has had a nervous breakdown. Lauren lies to Max that the funeral has already taken place, but later admits that Tanya does not want him there. On the day of the funeral, Cora shouts at Max, urging him to stay away as he has done enough damage to his family, and mentions that she had to sedate a grief-stricken Tanya to get her into the car to go to the funeral. Tanya arrives at the church with Cora, but is unable to get out and tells Lauren that she feels like she has failed as a mother. Lauren reassures Tanya it is fine for her to miss the service as Abi loved her and at the end; Tanya says goodbye to Lauren. Months later, Cora reveals that Tanya has been admitted to a psychiatric hospital because of the increasing trauma of losing Abi. When Lauren returns for Dot's funeral in December 2022, she reveals that Tanya has been caring for Cora after she injured her hip, and is upset to miss her funeral. When Oscar (now played by Pierre Counihan-Moullier) returns in July 2025, he reveals that Tanya kicked him out due to his involvement in a gang. When Oscar unintentionally attacks and injures Patrick Trueman (Rudolph Walker), he explains to Lauren that Tanya was unable to look after him growing up due to the emotional toll that Abi's death took on her. He therefore stopped going to school and in an effort to avoid burdening a grieving Tanya, he started to spend more time away from home, eventually turning to crime and leading to their estrangement. When Max returns, he mentions that he left their granddaughter AJ in Tanya's care.

== Reception ==
For her role as Tanya, Joyner was nominated for "Best Newcomer" at the 2007 Inside Soap Awards. Joyner won the 'Most Popular Actress' award at the Digital Spy Soap Awards in 2008 for the part of Tanya and also went on to win 'Best Dramatic Performance' at the 2008 British Soap Awards and made the final four in the 'Best Actress' category. Joyner was nominated for the "best actress" award at the All About Soap Awards in 2012 and later won the award. In 2012, Joyner and Wood won the Best On-Screen Partnership category at the British Soap Awards. On Digital Spy's 2012 end of year reader poll, Joyner was nominated for "Best Female Soap Actor" and came fourth with 13.4% of the vote.

The character has been pivotal in the transformation of EastEnders. Christmas Day 2007 saw Tanya discover husband Max and stepdaughter-in-law Stacey's affair and was watched by 14.3 million viewers, making it the highest rated EastEnders episode in three years and the highest rated television broadcast of 2007. In March 2008 viewers watched Tanya bury husband Max alive. This was the most watched EastEnders episode of 2008 and the episode received 116 complaints from viewers.

The UK communications regulator Ofcom later found that the episodes depicting the storyline were in breach of the 2005 Broadcasting Code. They contravened the rules regarding protection of children by appropriate scheduling, appropriate depiction of violence before the 9 p.m. watershed and appropriate depiction of potentially offensive content.

== Awards and nominations ==
List of award nominations, with the year of ceremony, category, nominated work, and result
Award	Year	Category	Nominated work	Result	Ref(s)
All About Soap Awards (Note: Previously known as All About Soap Awards.)	2008	Best Slap (with Lacey Turner)	EastEnders	Won	
All About Soap Awards	2008	Best Tearjerker	EastEnders	Won	
All About Soap Awards	2008	Fatal Attraction (with Rob Kazinsky)	EastEnders	Nominated	
All About Soap Awards	2009	I'm A Survivor	EastEnders	Nominated	
All About Soap Awards	2012	Best Actress	EastEnders	Won	
All About Soap Awards	2012	Best Couple (with Jake Wood)	EastEnders	Won	
British Soap Awards	2008	Best Actress	EastEnders	Nominated	
British Soap Awards	2008	Best Dramatic Performance	EastEnders	Won	
British Soap Awards	2009	Best Actress	EastEnders	Nominated	
British Soap Awards	2012	Best Actress	EastEnders	Shortlisted	
British Soap Awards	2012	Best Dramatic Performance	EastEnders	Won	
British Soap Awards	2012	Best On-Screen Partnership (with Jake Wood)	EastEnders	Won	
British Soap Awards	2013	Best Dramatic Performance	EastEnders	Nominated	
Digital Spy Soap / Readers Awards	2008	Most Popular Actress	EastEnders	Won	
Digital Spy Soap / Readers Awards	2011	Best Soap Actress	EastEnders	Won	
Digital Spy Soap / Readers Awards	2012	Best Female Soap Actor	EastEnders	Nominated	
Digital Spy Soap / Readers Awards	2015	Funniest Soap Moment	EastEnders	Won	
Inside Soap Awards	2007	Best Newcomer	EastEnders	Shortlisted	
Inside Soap Awards	2008	Best Actress	EastEnders	Longlisted	
Inside Soap Awards	2008	Best Dramatic Performance	EastEnders	Shortlisted	
Inside Soap Awards	2011	Best Wedding	EastEnders	Longlisted	
Inside Soap Awards	2011	Sexiest Female	EastEnders	Shortlisted	
M.E.N. Theatre Awards	2007	Best Fringe Performer	Raw	Nominated	
National Television Awards	2007	Most Popular Newcomer	EastEnders	Shortlisted	
Rose d'Or	2006	Best Female Comedy Performer	Swinging	Won	
Royal Welsh College of Music & Drama		'Friends’ prize for acting'	The woman who walked into doors	Won	
RTS Midlands Awards	2018	Female Acting Performance	Shakespeare & Hathaway: Private Investigators	Nominated	
RTS North West Awards	2011	Best Performance in a Comedy	Candy Cabs	Nominated	
RTS North West Awards	2015	Best Performance in a Single Drama or Drama Series (Female)	Ordinary Lies	Shortlisted	
TRIC Awards	2012	TV Soap Personality	EastEnders	Nominated	
TV Choice Awards (Note: Previously known as the TV Quick Awards and then the TV Quick & Choice.)	2007	Best Soap Actress	EastEnders	Nominated	
TV Choice Awards	2007	Best Newcomer	EastEnders	Nominated	
TV Choice Awards	2012	Best Soap Actress	EastEnders	Shortlisted	
TV Choice Awards	2021	Best Actress	Ackley Bridge	Nominated	
TV Now Awards	2009	Favourite Female Soap Star	EastEnders	Nominated	
TV Now Awards	2010	Favourite Soap Family	EastEnders	Nominated	
