= Dexter Hartman =

- EastEnders character
- Portrayed by: Khali Best
- Duration: 2013–2015
- First appearance: Episode 4565; 7 January 2013
- Last appearance: Episode 4990; 2 January 2015
- Introduced by: Lorraine Newman
In-universe information
- Occupation: Mechanic
- Father: Sam James
- Mother: Ava Hartman
- Grandmothers: Cora Cross
- Aunts: Tanya Branning; Rainie Cross
- First cousins: Abi Branning; Lauren Branning; Oscar Branning

Dexter Hartman is a fictional character from the BBC soap opera EastEnders, played by Khali Best. His debut was on 7 January 2013. Dexter is the grandson of Cora Cross (Ann Mitchell) and son of her illegitimate daughter, Ava Hartman (Clare Perkins). Dexter's storylines include his feuds with Jay Brown (Jamie Borthwick) and Lola Pearce (Danielle Harold), his job as a mechanic under Phil Mitchell (Steve McFadden) and his struggle to accept his drunk father, Sam James (Cornell S John).

In 2014, Best was suspended from the show for three months by executive producer Dominic Treadwell-Collins after attacking a taxi driver in London. In November 2014, it was confirmed that Dexter would be written out of EastEnders in early 2015, and he made his final appearance on 2 January 2015.

== Creation and development ==
=== Casting and introduction ===
Introduced by then executive producer, Lorraine Newman, the character and casting was announced on 8 November 2012. Khali Best would join the cast as a series regular and play Dexter, Ava Hartman (Clare Perkins)'s son. Best said of his casting, "I am delighted to be joining the cast of EastEnders and working with such great actors so early in my career is an amazing opportunity. I am really excited to see what the writers have in store." The show's executive producer, Lorraine Newman, predicted that Dexter would be hugely popular with the audience", and it was revealed that he would work at the local garage (the Arches) and would be friends with Jay Brown (Jamie Borthwick) and Lola Pearce (Danielle Harold). It was said that he comes to Walford to meet his family, that he previously knew nothing about.

Best was cast in the role of Dexter after he attended several workshops held by the producers of the series where they observed his improvisational skills. During one of the final workshops, Best was paired with Clare Perkins as her son, which is wear the writers came up with the idea for the storyline and the characters. Best had just booked a role in Choir Boy at the Royal Court Theatre, when he was called to audition for EastEnders and offered the role of Dexter. In September 2013 when it was announced that Cornell John and Clare Perkins would depart the series, new executive producer, Dominic Treadwell-Collins decided to keep Best on as Dexter. Of the decision, Best said, "It means the world—to do something and be recognised is a great feeling. Anyone would love that—I'm just going to keep doing what I am doing and as long as it's beneficial for the show I have no problem staying here." In May 2014, Best was suspended from filming for three months. Reports later surfaced that Best had allegedly assaulted a taxi driver. Best made his onscreen return on 22 September 2014.

Dexter arrives in Albert Square on 7 January 2013 and briefly clashes with Jay when he befriends his cousin, Abi Branning (Lorna Fitzgerald), Jay's girlfriend. Of his character's introduction, Best explained, "It's a great introduction. There's already a lot of tension within the family for various reasons, so there's a little bit of fun to be had by adding Dexter to the mix." Dexter is adamant about having a relationship with his grandmother, Cora Cross (Ann Mitchell) and she immediately takes a liking to him.

In an interview with All About Soap, Best revealed that Dexter is delighted when they move to Walford. "He's looking forward to moving there, because it's a new start for him." Dexter, who has been having some difficulties, but with this move to Walford, "he's coming out on top now." Newman revealed that the characters would be involved in a storyline with Bianca Jackson (Patsy Palmer) in 2013, which would help familiarise them with the Square. The executive producer also discussed plans to set Ava and Dexter up as a "unit." The writers introduced the character gradually, with viewers seeing the character in "small doses," which Best appreciated. In an early storyline, Dexter reconnects with a former friend and gang member from his past who has taken an interest in the young Liam Butcher (James Forde), Bianca's son. According to Best, Dexter's involvement in the storyline provides insight into what Dexter could have been, had his life turned out differently. Dexter's friendship with Lola however seems to be much more. Though Best was not aware of any potential plans to pair the characters, he believed Dexter liked Lola because she is a "real, genuine person."

=== Characterisation ===
Dexter is 20 years old upon his arrival. Upon his announcement, Newman called him a "force of nature", adding that he is "cheeky, forthright, confident but highly protective of his mum and vice versa." Best described Dexter as having a "watchful eye," over his mother particularly. Best said that he and Dexter had a similar background, but both he and his character make the best of their lives. In an interview with Inside Soap, Best said there are many different sides to the character's personality. Dexter does not have a problem admitting his mistakes, if he feels he has made an error in his judgement. In a behind the scenes interview, Best described Dexter as a "very passionate person. If he sees something wrong he won't let things lie." Best said "Dexter has a funny way of charming the pants off of people." In an interview with Radio Times, Best described Dexter as being "very eccentric." In a television interview on ITV's Lorraine, Best said "Dexter is full of mischief. He's always full of mischief..."

=== Sam James and kidney donation ===
In April 2013, it was announced that actor Cornell S John had joined the cast in the role of Dexter's absent father and Ava's ex-husband, Sam James. Lorraine Newman said Sam's addition created a "solid family unit with Dexter and Ava." However, both Ava and Dexter would have a difficult time allowing Sam back into their lives. Best told Digital Spy that Sam's introduction would give the characters "more colours." Best said that Sam coming back is the "biggest hurdle that Dexter has had to overcome." The actor continued, "It was quite challenging for me to get my head around the emotions that Dexter was experiencing, given that his dad has been completely absent for 20 years." Ava introduces Sam as "Jacob," an old friend. Dexter's immediate reaction upon finding out about Sam is anger because Ava have been lying to him. However his anger comes from not understanding how to deal with Sam because "it's too much emotion to deal with at that time," Best said. In an interview with Inside Soap Best admitted that it was "fun to play Dexter's angry side." Best explained that it would take a while before Dexter could work through his anger because he has every reason to be angry. Best described the process as "Dexter's moral clock ticking over—and his attitude doesn't wash with Sam."

In September 2013, it was announced that Cornell John and Clare Perkins would exit the series as Sam and Ava. When new executive producer, Dominic Treadwell-Collins took over, several actors were fired from the cast, however, an insider revealed that the "conclusion of the Sam storyline was planned many months ago," and Treadwell-Collins decided to leave it be. However, it was confirmed that Best would continue with the series beyond the departures of his onscreen parents. Best revealed that he did not expect Dexter to stick around when the story about Sam, Ava and Dexter was finished but he was excited about the new producer choosing to stick with the character. However, Best said he was a bit scared, considering Dexter was kind of left out in the cold after Sam and Ava's departures.

In an interview with What's on TV, Best explained that learning that Sam may die without a kidney transplant "puts it all into perspective about what it means to have his dad in his life." Dexter does not consider being Sam's donor until he hears of Ava's plans to get tested and he makes plans to get tested on his own. However, he doesn't tell Ava because he "doesn't want her to worry." Fortunately, Dexter can confide in Jay about his dilemma. When Ava tries to talk him out of donating his kidney, he refuses. According to Best, "Dexter has his own moral barometer and will do what he needs to do for the sake of his new-found family. I think he's got the tools in the box to do the right thing..." However, Dexter is eventually to work through his anger and resentment toward his father. Of Dexter being happy with his father, Best said "It grew into something people wanted to see." However, Best previewed that the storyline would take a dark turn. The story culminates with Dexter learning that Sam was aware that he needed a kidney transplant before he came to Walford. Best stated to Radio Times, "Dexter needed to understand the family situation, especially the relationship that he hadn’t had with his dad." However, Best appreciated that instead of the characters being killed off, the door was left open for their return. With Sam and Ava absent from his life, the writers set the character up to interact more with Cora and the Branning family, including his "uncle" Max Branning (Jake Wood).

=== The Arches ===
Dexter quickly realises that Phil (Steve McFadden) is in a position of power, as the owner of the garage, and "works out a way he can best manipulate that," Best said of Dexter's job at the Arches. When Dexter loses Phil's £10,000 after selling a car he blames himself and "he's very frightened," when thinking about his potential fate Best remarked. Phil even goes so far as to threaten Dexter with a wrench. Best continued and said that Dexter has come to understand the "power triangle at the Arches and his place within it." However, Best on the other hand enjoyed any opportunity he got to work with McFadden. Best said that the location shoot where the money was stolen was one and the wrench scene with Steve McFadden's Phil Mitchell as some of his favorite memories with the series.

=== The Carters ===
In late 2013/early 2014, the writers introduced the Carter family and Dexter immediately clashes with the daughter, Nancy Carter (Maddy Hill). Best admitted that of all the female characters, Nancy is one of three that he thought Dexter would work well with, due to the "nature of the characters." Despite Nancy's parents, Mick (Danny Dyer) and Linda (Kellie Bright) seeming very protective of their children, Best believed Dexter's charm would help him win them over. However, he hinted that Mick would be much tougher than Linda. Of a potential relationship with Nancy, Best said, "Only time will tell." However, Best and his costar Maddy Hill attended acting school together, and he helped her get acclimated to her new job. In an interview with Unreality Primetime, Best said Dexter and Nancy had become "good friends." He continued, "Dexter doesn't like 'ordinary' and [Nancy]'s very much out of the ordinary." According to Best, they share a mutual attraction.

== Storylines ==
Dexter arrives in Albert Square after finding a photograph and address for his mother, Ava's (Clare Perkins), family that she has recently been reunited with after being placed for adoption as a baby. Dexter meets his cousin, Abi Branning (Lorna Fitzgerald), and they quickly become friends, with Dexter being invited to a family dinner, though Abi and the rest of the family are unaware that Dexter is related to them until Ava arrives to take him home. Abi is angry with Dexter for lying and Ava is unhappy that Dexter has gone back to Walford. Later, Ava's car breaks down in Walford on her way to a job interview, so Dexter takes it to the local garage where he becomes friends with Abi's boyfriend, Jay Brown (Jamie Borthwick), and Phil Mitchell (Steve McFadden) offers him work so he can pay for the repairs. Dexter becomes friends with Lola Pearce (Danielle Harold) and is shocked to discover that she is a mother. Lola is disappointed by his reaction but they remain friends. However, Phil, who has custody of Lola's baby, Lexi Pearce, is unhappy about Lola and Dexter being friends and tells Lola to stop seeing him. When Bianca Butcher (Patsy Palmer) tells Ava that her son Liam Butcher (James Forde) is in a gang, Ava reveals that Dexter used to be in a gang, which turns out to be the same gang. Ava and Dexter give Bianca advice, but after the gang are arrested and released on bail, they trash Ava and Dexter's home. Dexter tells Ava they have to move away.

Ava decides to move to Walford and rents a flat on the Square. Dexter's father, Sam James (Cornell S John), arrives unexpectedly and initially hides his true identity from Dexter, who takes a liking to him. When Dexter discovers the truth, he is angry at both Ava and Sam. Sam stays in Walford despite Ava and Dexter telling him to leave. Ava slowly realises she still has romantic feelings for Sam and they reunite. Dexter is initially hostile to this, but he slowly warms to his father. It emerges that Sam requires a kidney transplant. Dexter decides to take a test to see if he is a match, but Ava refuses to let him. He does so anyway, and he is a match, and Dexter and Sam go through the transplant operation. Ava fusses over both of them while they are recovering, and while Dexter is used to Ava's overprotective nature, Sam feels smothered. On Dexter's birthday, Ava discovers Sam came back to Walford to get Dexter's kidney, and ends their relationship, throwing him out onto the street. However, she does not tell Dexter the truth about Sam's departure, and he is angry with her, blaming her for his sudden disappearance. He moves in with Cora at the Branning's, and begins drinking heavily. He tries to kiss Lola but she rejects his advances as she is now with Peter Beale (Ben Hardy). He is fired from his job at the Arches after arguing with Phil and accidentally injuring Jay, and later, in a row with him and Abi, he reveals Jay's infidelity with Kitty to his stunned cousin. However, they reconcile and forgive Dexter for his wayward actions. After learning the truth, Dexter reunites with Ava, but when she goes to Newcastle for a new job, Dexter and Cora move in with Cora's boyfriend, Patrick Trueman (Rudolph Walker), as they are no longer wanted at the Branning's.

In January 2014, Dexter clashes with Nancy Carter (Maddy Hill), when she refuses to serve him alcohol, and she later punches him in the face, after untruthfully exclaiming that he touched her bum. In March 2014, Cora and Patrick's relationship ends, due to her making some insensitive comments to their friend and neighbour, Dot Branning (June Brown), about her deceased son, Nick Cotton (John Altman). After forming a close friendship with Nancy, Dexter realises that he loves her, although he is unsure whether she feels the same way about him. In May 2014, Dexter decides to tell Nancy how he feels, but she punches him in the face again, after mistaking him for an intruder. He later kisses her, and she is unsure how to react. After Patrick kicks Cora and Dexter out of his house, Cora's new friend, Stan Carter (Timothy West), who is Nancy's grandfather, gives Cora money to buy her own flat. Dexter then later stays with Ava for a while, returning in September in time for Phil and Sharon's wedding. He later begins a relationship with Nancy but she is upset when he leaves to stay with Ava over Christmas. Dexter later realises that his relationship with Nancy is not working out but gives her some heartfelt advice before leaving for Newcastle to stay with Ava.

== Reception ==
=== Critical response ===
Best revealed to Radio Times that on the day his first episode aired, he was unaware that the episode was on, and he "literally stopped traffic" on his way to the cash point. "People were getting out of their cars and beeping their horns" Some fans hoped for a romance between Dexter and Lola.

=== Awards and nominations ===
Best was nominated in the "Best Newcomer" at the 2013 Inside Soap Awards for his portrayal of Dexter. Best picked up one of two awards for the series by winning the category. Best was nominated for The British Soap Awards "Best Newcomer" category for the year 2013. Best was also nominated in the "Best Newcomer" category at the 19th National Television Awards in 2014. Best won the category. Vicky Prior of the British newspaper Metro said Best was worthy of his victory and praised his portrayal of Dexter.
