= Lorraine Newman =

British television producer (born 1978)

- Born: 1978 (age 47–48)
- Occupations: Producer, scriptwriter
- Years active: 1997–present
- Employer: BBC (1997–2017)
- Notable work: See below
- Television: EastEnders

Lorraine Newman (born 1978) is a British scriptwriter, television producer, and the executive producer of the BBC soap opera EastEnders from 2012 to 2013. Newman, who has worked on EastEnders for "nearly 20 years", received the role of executive producer when her predecessor stepped down in 2012. Newman was also the executive producer of Babs, a BBC biopic about Dame Barbara Windsor.

== Career ==
=== EastEnders ===
"She knows EastEnders like the back of her hand, so everyone feels very confident and happy because we're in safe hands. Lorraine knows the show and everybody knows Lorraine, so it doesn't feel like a new boss. You can trust her opinion on things because she knows the characters so well".

— Nitin Ganatra talking about Newman becoming the executive producer (2012).

Newman first began working on the BBC soap opera EastEnders aged 19 as a script secretary and, according to John Yorke (Controller of BBC Drama Production and New Talent), is the first executive producer to have "occupied every editorial role on the show".

In March 2012, it was announced that the then current executive producer of EastEnders, Bryan Kirkwood was to step down, with "experienced series producer" Newman taking over the role on a temporary basis. Kirkwood said, "I'm delighted to leave the show in the capable hands of Lorraine Newman. Lorraine has been by my side every step of the way for the last two years and knows EastEnders inside out. I wish her and the show every future success". In June 2012, it was announced that Newman would become the full-time executive producer. Newman commented, "It is an absolute honour to be taking on the role of executive producer at EastEnders on a permanent basis. I am looking forward to leading a talented creative team, cast and crew into 2013". Yorke said, "Over the last few months, Newman has steered the show through a period of considerable change, and she's done an amazing job positioning the show for one of the most exciting autumns I can remember. With her depth of experience, her passion for the programme and her commitment to talent on-screen and off, she's the perfect person to take EastEnders forward". Her first episode aired on 16 July.

==== As Executive Producer ====
One of Newman's first key tasks as temporary executive producer was to oversee production of a special episode featuring a live segment in which the character of Billy Mitchell (Perry Fenwick) carries the Olympic Torch as an official torch bearer in the 2012 Summer Olympics torch relay. Carl Doran, creative head of the BBC’s Torch coverage, revealed the London Organising Committee of the Olympic and Paralympic Games (LOCOG) and EastEnders production team had worked for two years to organise this. The episode was part of the official torch relay, meaning the torch made a special detour from London to the EastEnders set at the BBC Elstree Centre, Borehamwood.

Billy Mitchell was also involved in one of Newman’s most controversial storylines, in which his granddaughter Lola Pearce (Danielle Harold) has her baby taken away by social worker Trish Barnes. Real-life social workers protested this "unhelpful portrayal", with the British Association of Social Workers (BASW) calling the BBC "too lazy and arrogant" to correctly portray the child protection process, and saying that the baby was taken "without sufficient grounds to do so". Bridget Robb, acting chief of the BASW, said the storyline provoked "real anger among a profession well used to a less than accurate public and media perception of their jobs".

Newman's first major cast change was reintroduction of Sharon Watts (Letitia Dean) in August 2012, which Newman revealed had been a year in the planning. Upon her return, Dean said that Newman was "very good at character insight". Ben Mitchell (Joshua Pascoe) departed in the same month following the conclusion of the storyline of Heather Trott (Cheryl Fergison)'s murder storyline, with Newman confirming the departure of Anthony Moon (Matt Laspinskas) soon afterwards. Newman later introduced Ava Hartman (Clare Perkins), the secret daughter of Cora Cross (Ann Mitchell), and Ava's son Dexter (Khali Best), and also upgraded Poppy Meadow (Rachel Bright) from a recurring to a regular character. Major departures under Newman’s tenure include Syed Masood (Marc Elliott) and Christian Clarke (John Partridge) in November 2012 and villain Derek Branning (Jamie Foreman), killed off in the Christmas Day episode.

On 29 July 2013, Newman left the post, with Dominic Treadwell-Collins taking over. Her final episode aired on 5 December 2013 In 2018, she returned to EastEnders as a writer.

== Filmography ==
Television

Year	Title	Role	Employer
1997	EastEnders	Script Editor/Secretary	BBC
1998	City Central	Script Editor/Secretary	BBC
1998	EastEnders: The Mitchells - Naked Truths	Script Editor/Secretary	BBC
2000–2001	EastEnders	Script Producer	BBC
2000	Thin Ice	Script Editor	BBC
2001–2003, 2005–2012	EastEnders	Series Producer	BBC
2002	EastEnders	Producer	BBC
2003	Perfectly Frank	Producer	BBC
2003	Slaters in Detention	Producer	BBC
2010–2011	EastEnders: E20	Series Producer	BBC
2012–2013	EastEnders	Executive Producer	BBC
2012	Billy's Olympic Nightmare	Executive Producer	BBC
2016–2017	Babs	Executive Producer	BBC
