= Cornell John =

British actor

- Born: Cornell Solomon John; 1963 (age 62–63)
- Occupation: Actor
- Years active: 1999–present

Cornell Solomon John (born 1963) is a British actor who has appeared in various film and television productions since 1999. He is most renowned for his role as Trife's uncle, Curtis, in the films Kidulthood (2006), Adulthood (2008) and Brotherhood in addition to later starring in the BBC soap opera EastEnders as Sam James, during 2013. He is also known for having originated the role of Mufasa in the West End production of the musical The Lion King.

== Career ==
John made his screen debut in two episodes of the television series The Knock. Over the course of the next few years he appeared in television shows including Maisie Raine and Lenny Henry in Pieces, and also appeared in the films Rottweiler and Red Mercury.

However, his most establishing role as a film actor was as Curtis, Trevor's Uncle, in the 2006 film Kidulthood, a role which he reprised for the sequel to the film Adulthood (2008), the latter of which was directed by fellow actor Noel Clarke. He then reprised the role for a 3rd time in the sequel to Adulthood, Brotherhood in 2016. He also appeared as Glenstorm in the fantasy film The Chronicles of Narnia: Prince Caspian in 2008, and the same year he appeared playing the same character in a video game of the same name. He has also appeared in other video games including EyeToy: Play and Fable. He has appeared on soap opera Doctors on two occasions, the first in 2001 and the second in 2005. He has also appeared in another medical drama Holby City on two occasions, the first in 2002, before returning to appear in another episode of the series ten years on in 2012. He appeared in his third medical drama Casualty in 2010. He appeared as Didi Mputu in four episodes of Five Days (2010) and as Sid in three episodes of Inside Men (2012).

He appeared in an episode of Top Boy in 2011, while other film credits include Anuvahood (2011) and Jack the Giant Slayer (2013).

From 2011 until 2012, he played the role of Wensley Dale in the children's television show Rastamouse. He appeared in 31 episodes of the series in total.

In 2012, he made a one-off appearance in the BBC television series, Waterloo Road. He played the role of Lionel Tsibi, the uncle of regular character Lula Tsibi (Marlene Madenge).

In 2013, he was cast in the role Sam James in the long-running BBC soap opera EastEnders. His character is introduced as the estranged husband to established character Ava Hartman (Clare Perkins) and father to Dexter Hartman (Khali Best). He was cast in the role by executive producer Lorraine Newman, and made his first appearance on the show on 14 May 2013. He made his final appearance on 16 December 2013.

In 2016, Cornell John played the character of Jonas Barrett in the British TV series Victoria shown on PBS MASTERPIECE.

In 2018, John appeared as 'Arnold Guzman' in the film Fantastic Beasts: The Crimes of Grindelwald.

== Filmography ==
Year	Film	Role	Other notes
1999	Rage	Razor	
2003	Kaena: The Prophecy	Demok	Voice role, English version
2004	Rottweiler	Dongoro	
2006	Kidulthood	Uncle Curtis	
2008	Adulthood	Uncle Curtis	Billed as Cornell S. John
2008	The Chronicles of Narnia: Prince Caspian	Glenstorm	
2005	Red Mercury	Neville	
2011	Anuvahood	Yardie	
2013	Jack the Giant Slayer	Fee	Voice role, billed as Cornell S. John
2016	Brotherhood	Uncle Curtis	
2016	Captain America: Civil War	Attaché	Billed as Cornell S. John
2018	Fantastic Beasts: The Crimes of Grindelwald	Arnold Guzman	
2020	His House	The Apeth	Voice role
2023	The Pope's Exorcist	Bishop Lumumba	
Year	Television series	Role	Other notes
1997	Thief Takers	Thomas Keyworth	1 episode
1999	Maisie Raine	Rene	1 episode
1999	The Knock	Gannon	2 episodes
2000	Lenny Henry in Pieces		1 episode
2001	Doctors	Ray Adams	1 episode
2002	EastEnders	Jimmy	3 episodes
2002	Holby City	Harry Sutherland	1 episode
2002	Doctors	D.S. Dave Patterson	1 episode
2009	No Signal!		2 episodes
2010	Casualty	Joey Craven	1 episode
2010	Five Days	Didi Mputu	4 episodes
2011	Top Boy	Wendell	1 episode
2011–12	Rastamouse	Wensley Dale	Voice role, 38 episodes
2012	Waterloo Road	Lionel Tsibi	1 episode
2012	Holby City	Vivian Wallace	1 episode
2012	Inside Men	Sid	3 episodes
2013	EastEnders	Sam James	49 episodes
2015	Death in Paradise	William Lee	1 episode
2016	Victoria	Jonas Barrett	1 episode
2020–22	Gangs of London	Joseph Singer	5 episodes
Year	Video game	Role	Other notes
2000	Crash Bash	Aku Aku, Uka Uka	Voice role, listed under "Special Thanks"
2008	The Chronicles of Narnia: Prince Caspian	Glenstorm	Voice role
