= Patrick Trueman =

Fictional character from EastEnders

- EastEnders character
- Portrayed by: Rudolph Walker
- Duration: 2001–present
- First appearance: Episode 2166; 13 September 2001
- Introduced by: John Yorke
- Spin-off appearances: EastEnders: E20 (2010); The Queen Vic Quiz Night (2020)
In-universe information
- Other names: Patrick Neville Loftus Alfonzo Trueman
- Occupation: Shopkeeper; B&B owner; Barman; Potman
- Mother: Eleanor Trueman
- Wife: Audrey Trueman (until 2001); Yolande Duke (2004–2009, 2025–present); Sheree Baptiste (2019–2021)
- Sons: Anthony Trueman; Isaac Baptiste
- Stepsons: Paul Trueman
- Grandsons: Josh Goodwin; Euan Trueman
- Granddaughters: Jasmine Fisher

Patrick Trueman is a fictional character from the BBC soap opera EastEnders, played by Rudolph Walker. He made his first appearance on 13 September 2001. On 7 December 2015, Walker filmed his 1,000th episode as Patrick. For his portrayal of Patrick, Walker was awarded the British Soap Award for Outstanding Achievement at the 2018 British Soap Awards.

His storylines include reconciling with his adoptive son Paul Trueman (Gary Beadle) and biological son Anthony Trueman (Nicholas Bailey), being the possible father of Denise Fox (Diane Parish), to whom he is a father figure, a friendship with both Dot (June Brown) and Jim Branning (John Bardon), his marriage to Yolande Duke (Angela Wynter), an affair with Pat Evans (Pam St Clement), the death of his adoptive son Paul, being assaulted by an unknown assailant in his own shop, dealing with Ben Mitchell (Joshua Pascoe) and his father Phil Mitchell (Steve McFadden) starting a vendetta against him, a relationship with Cora Cross (Ann Mitchell), being injured after falling from a ladder, discovering that Denise's fiancé Ian Beale (Adam Woodyatt) had sex with prostitute Rainie Cross (Tanya Franks), suffering two strokes, a relationship with Claudette Hubbard (Ellen Thomas), becoming embroiled in Claudette's feud with her son Vincent Hubbard (Richard Blackwood), marrying his childhood sweetheart Sheree Trueman (Suzette Llewellyn) and discovering he fathered her son, Isaac Baptiste (Stevie Basaula). After the breakdown of his marriage to Sheree, Patrick reunites with his ex-wife Yolande, who he supports through her sexual assault by her pastor Gideon Clayton (Howard Saddler). Patrick and Yolande remarry, and the same year Patrick has to cope with Anthony's death on Christmas Day, and the revelation that Anthony's secret daughter Jasmine Fisher (Indeyarna Donaldson-Holness) had murdered him in defence of her mother Zoe Slater (Michelle Ryan).

== Creation and development ==
=== Introduction ===
Patrick was introduced by executive producer John Yorke as a replacement parental figure to the Trueman brothers; Anthony (Nicholas Bailey) and Paul (Gary Beadle), following the departure of Audrey Trueman (Corinne Skinner-Carter), the mother of Anthony and Paul who was killed off in September 2001. Patrick first appeared at Audrey's "rum-fuelled wake" as her estranged husband. Patrick has gone on to be one of the longest running characters in the serial, having appeared continuously for over two decades.

=== Characterisation ===
Walker was keen to play a comic element to the character; telling Larry Jaffee of Walford Gazette, "Before joining, I told the producer comedy is an area I would like to explore with the character because there was not enough of it in the show. Patrick treats a lot of things with a certain amount of humour. His way of escaping a problem is to find something funny to do or say or sometimes to get himself out of a tight corner. That’s really the sort of foundation. I try to put as much humour as possible into the character."

In 2018, Patrick was described by Bailey as "charisma personified" and a "Caribbean alpha male" who "stands his ground" and "takes no nonsense". Yorke revealed that a lot of Patrick's character traits come from ideas from Walker himself, so the character is not stereotypical. The character is known for his trademark laugh, trilby hat and his catchphrase, "Yeah, man!".

=== Relationships ===
Yolande Trueman (Angela Wynter) was introduced in 2003 as a love interest for Patrick. Following their screen marriage in 2004, the characters were involved in the BBC's season "Taking Care", which covered issues "surrounding a different kind of childhood". The Truemans were involved in a storyline about fostering after they decided to foster a 14-year-old boy, JJ, following an encounter with him at their Bed and Breakfast. In 2007, executive producer Diederick Santer used Patrick and Yolande to cover a storyline about racism, that according to the producer, was inspired by the 2007 Celebrity Big Brother race row, sparked by supposed racist bullying of Bollywood actress Shilpa Shetty by UK celebrity Jade Goody. In the storyline, the characters Jay Brown and Sean Slater used racist phrases to the Truemans, and their reaction to the insults. Santer commented, "The Celebrity Big Brother race row kicked off as I took charge of my first scripts. I thought it was fascinating because it showed there was a real need for a debate about race in Britain. [Big Brother] didn’t do it particularly well, so I thought it could be something EastEnders should do. Our stuff won’t be overly moralistic or preachy but it will tackle this serious issue head on." Wynter was axed from EastEnders in 2008, ending Patrick and Yolande's screen union. Wynter commented, "Patrick and Yolande’s marriage is the only representation of a black union in British TV, which I am very proud to have played." Discussing Wynter's axing, Rudolph Walker said: "I really enjoyed working with Angela, because apart from anything else, she was a tremendous help to me – we've known each other a long time. I have to be thankful for the time she was in the show, and I'm in regular contact with her. I know she does watch EastEnders and while she obviously misses being part of the cast, she still enjoys it. Whether she's keeping an eye on Patrick or Rudolph, I can't be sure!"

=== Racism ===
In February 2009, EastEnders aired its first episode consisting of an entirely black cast. The episode focused up on Patrick and the Fox family. It concentrated on Patrick reminiscing about London in the 1950s after his arrival from the Caribbean. The script involved discussion about racism, with reference to the real life occurrence of the 1958 Notting Hill race riots in London. Taking the discussion of racism further, the characters considered it lessened in the 21st century, but that it still existed, possibly in more subtle forms. The episode averaged 8.37m (35.6%) viewers. It was part of a wider storyline concentrating on Patrick's past, and the murder of his fiancée during the race riots. Actor Edward Woodward was brought in especially for the storyline as Tommy Clifford, the man who killed her and subsequently sought his redemption before he died.

== Storylines ==
Trinidadian Patrick arrives in Walford for his estranged wife, Audrey Trueman's (Corinne Skinner-Carter) funeral, reuniting with his two sons, Paul (Gary Beadle) and Anthony Trueman (Nicholas Bailey), after decades apart. After a period of adjustment, the Trueman brothers accept Patrick; however, Paul grows suspicious of him and secretly performs a DNA test, where it is revealed that although Anthony is Patrick's biological son, Paul is not. It transpires that Paul is the son of Patrick's best friend Milton Hibbert (Jeffery Kissoon). Despite the upset, Patrick and Paul maintain a father-son relationship. Patrick becomes close friends with pensioner Jim Branning (John Bardon), who helps him woo Yolande Duke (Angela Wynter) with love letters after Patrick has a holiday romance with her in Trinidad. As a result, Yolande moves to Walford, leaving her strict Christian husband Victor Duke (Ben Thomas), whose attempt to bribe Patrick to finish with Yolande ultimately fails. Patrick and Yolande marry and briefly foster a young girl named Katie (Parhys-Jai Cato) in 2004, though they find it difficult when she is returned to her mother. Paul starts dealing drugs for Andy Hunter (Michael Higgs), ultimately leading to his death when he tries to double-cross Andy. Patrick is devastated to lose his son and begins a vendetta against Andy.

Patrick rents the car-lot, hiring Pat Evans (Pam St Clement) to do bookkeeping. Patrick and Pat begin a casual affair, which Yolande discovers when Stacey Slater (Lacey Turner) informs her; Yolande slaps Pat, who retaliates. Yolande threatens to leave, but Patrick persuades her to rebuild their marriage. Yolande remains resentful and almost strays with Aubrey Valentine (Joseph Marcell), a member of Patrick's former band, The Five Hectors; Aubrey tries to destroy Patrick but fails and the Truemans remain together. Denise Fox (Diane Parish) discovers that a member of Patrick's band is her father although she is unsure which member. Patrick takes a DNA test and it is revealed that he is not Denise's father, but he pretends he is as he has grown attached to her. The truth comes out while Patrick and Denise holiday together; despite initial upset, Denise and the Truemans remain close. Patrick sees Denise as the daughter he never had and acts as grandfather to her two daughters Chelsea (Tiana Benjamin) and Libby Fox (Belinda Owusu).

After purchasing the Minute Mart grocery store, Patrick and Yolande run it together. Patrick is assaulted there, and although Chelsea and her friend Dean Wicks (Matt Di Angelo) claim the assailant is Sean Slater (Robert Kazinsky) in a set-up, it is later revealed to be Craig Dixon (Rory Jennings), whom Patrick had disagreed with over the sale of alcohol. Patrick becomes fearful of leaving his house, but eventually overcomes this with support from his wife and friends. After Yolande impresses a Minute Mart official, she is offered a management position in Birmingham. Yolande accepts and prepares to move, however Patrick is less keen. Yolande leaves for Birmingham in October 2008, leaving Patrick behind to sell their house under the premise he will join her later. However, Yolande ultimately decides she is happier without Patrick and ends their marriage, leaving Patrick devastated; they divorce in 2009. The Fox family move in with Patrick, including Denise's lover Lucas Johnson (Don Gilet), a religious fanatic. When Patrick discovers Lucas is withholding information about a tryst he has had with his ex-wife Trina (Sharon Duncan Brewster), Patrick orders him to confess. Lucas responds by blackmailing Patrick, threatening to tell Denise about his criminal past during the 1958 Notting Hill race riots when Patrick was convicted of assault. Patrick's past was revealed anyway, by Chelsea's boyfriend Theo Kelly (Rolan Bell), who is in league with Tommy Clifford (Edward Woodward). Tommy claims to be writing a book about black culture, but it is eventually revealed that he is the man who killed Patrick's fiancée, Ruth, in a fire in the 1950s. Patrick is furious, but eventually relents to Tommy's dying wish and forgives his criminal act moments before his death.

After attending an over-50s dance, Patrick starts a relationship with Liz Turner (Kate Williams), Denise's former mother-in-law. However, Patrick tires of her quickly and Liz moves away when it is revealed that Lucas is a serial killer who has murdered her son, Owen Turner (Lee Ross). Lucas is eventually imprisoned after holding Denise, Patrick, Libby and Chelsea hostage. Denise is supported through emotional recovery by Patrick and her sister Kim Fox (Tameka Empson). Kim purchases the B&B in Walford; Patrick and the Fox sisters run the business together, while Patrick also works as a potman in The Queen Vic.

When Patrick sees Ben Mitchell (Joshua Pascoe) kissing Duncan Willis (Steven France), Ben throws a brick through Patrick's window and confronts him. Ben's father, Phil (Steve McFadden) sees Patrick defending himself against Ben, and starts feuding with Patrick; Phil's aggression towards Patrick only ceases when Ben admits to Phil that he threatened Patrick so as not to divulge that he is gay. Patrick has a brief dalliance with Rose Cotton (Polly Perkins), and later loses his home when Kim's B&B is burnt down on Christmas Day. Patrick begins to keep stolen fireworks and alcohol in his home's basement for Alfie Moon (Shane Richie), which enhance the damage done by the fire and results in Kim being unable claim insurance. Patrick moves in with Rose and her sister Dot Branning (June Brown), but he is devastated when his friend Heather Trott (Cheryl Fergison) is murdered. The trauma of the murder deeply affects Patrick, and he decides to leave Walford temporarily to visit his son Anthony, returning a few months later. Patrick becomes friends with Cora Cross (Ann Mitchell). At a funeral of one of Patrick's old friends, they pretend to be in a relationship. Although Patrick has feelings for Cora, she insists they are just friends and their kiss was meaningless. After Patrick admits that he likes her as more than friends, they decide to start a relationship, taking it slowly. Patrick is disgusted when Ben is unmasked as Heather's killer, and it emerges that Jay Brown (Jamie Borthwick) helped cover it up. The whole square rejects Jay, but Patrick softens towards him when he remembers how he was victimised in the past and takes Jay to live with him as he has nowhere else to go. When Patrick becomes unwittingly involved with the return of Cora's daughter, Ava Hartman (Clare Perkins), Cora ends the relationship, but they remain friends.

When Patrick falls off a ladder, injuring his arm and leg, Denise and Kim vow to take care of him. However, when they are too busy, Denise hires Magda Bakowska (Wanda Opalinska) to look after Patrick. This frustrates him and when Magda leaves him on his own, Patrick becomes intoxicated and lashes out at Denise, culminating in her falling and cutting her face. Patrick soon reconciles with Denise, and recovers from his injuries. Patrick befriends Betty Spragg (Tessa Wyatt), and picks her as his dance partner over Cora. Cora is jealous, and makes fun of Betty behind her back, which angers Patrick and puts a strain on their friendship. Cora's granddaughter, Abi Branning (Lorna Fitzgerald) and Kim plot to get Cora and Patrick back together, locking them in a shed. Patrick then ends his friendship with Betty and resumes a relationship with Cora. Cora and her grandson Dexter Hartman (Khali Best) move in with Patrick briefly, but the relationship ends after Cora makes hurtful comments towards Dot following the death of her son Nick Cotton (John Altman).

Patrick suffers a number of mini-strokes, but recovers quickly and decides against visiting a doctor. He finds out that Ian had sex with prostitute Rainie Cross (Tanya Franks), so threatens Ian that he will tell Denise. After seeing Ian and Denise leaving, Patrick leaves Denise an urgent voicemail and then suffers a major stroke in the middle of the street and is hospitalised. Patrick loses the ability to speak and is very confused. Anthony returns to Walford to visit Patrick, but Patrick mistakes Anthony for his deceased stepson, Paul. Anthony reveals to Denise that he cannot look after Patrick, so gives Denise £2000 to look after him. Despite Ian's attempts to ensure the safety of his secret by putting Patrick in a care home, he eventually agrees to let Patrick live with him and Denise. However, Rainie reveals the truth to Denise. She tells Ian she forgives him, but when she discovers that Patrick knew but could not tell her because of his stroke, she decides to leave Ian. They then find Patrick's house broken into and trashed. Denise struggles to look after Patrick, but eventually he recovers from his stroke. He dislikes Kim's husband Vincent Hubbard (Richard Blackwood), and is suspicious of him but eventually Patrick accepts him, and is glad when Vincent finds an old record Patrick recorded with his former band.

Patrick starts dating Vincent's mother, Claudette Hubbard (Ellen Thomas). When Denise discovers Lucas's son, Jordan Johnson (Joivan Wade), is in trouble, Patrick is against helping him, but eventually bonds with Jordan's son JJ Johnson (Zayden Kareem) and is against Jordan and Denise visiting Lucas in prison, warning them that Lucas will manipulate them. He then discovers they are helping Lucas get work in the prison and tries to stop it, unsuccessfully. Patrick is shocked when he walks in on Vincent choking Claudette and gets him to stop, but Vincent reveals that Claudette murdered his father, Henry, many years ago, so Patrick attempts to call the police. As Claudette tries to stop him, she falls down the stairs and strikes her head on a brick. Patrick says he will get help but is then caught up in Denise's problems as Jordan is arrested for helping Lucas try to escape from prison. When Patrick returns to Vincent, he has buried Claudette, believing she is dead. He swears Patrick to secrecy or they will both be accused of murder. Unknown to them, Claudette, who has survived her ordeal, later escapes the basement. With Jordan in prison and JJ's mother dead, Denise vows to care for JJ until Jordan is released, but Patrick secretly calls social services. He confesses this to Denise, who is angry at Patrick. When Patrick says he cannot cope with covering up Claudette's death, Vincent offers him tickets to go to Trinidad for holiday, to which Patrick reluctantly agrees. However, Patrick sees Claudette in the square. He tells Vincent, who soon realises it is true. When Claudette returns, Patrick confirms to Vincent's foster sister Donna Yates (Lisa Hammond) that Vincent is telling the truth about Claudette killing his father. Claudette tries to threaten to show the police her neck bruises if Patrick calls the police on her, but Donna and Vincent make her leave. Patrick makes Vincent vow to protect his family and stop his dodgy dealings, he then leaves for Trinidad and he returns a few weeks later.

Eventually Patrick and Claudette reconcile and tell their friends and families they are dating again. Denise then reveals she is pregnant so Patrick supports her. Claudette becomes jealous of Patrick's friendship with Dot and dislikes Patrick's ideas for spending time together. Claudette lies to Patrick about her plans for their evening to stop him visiting Dot, and when Patrick finds out Claudette lied, he tells her to accept their friendship. Patrick realises Dot is having problems with her sight and she confides in him that she thinks she is going blind. Patrick takes Dot to lunch, forgetting that he agreed to meet Claudette; Claudette confronts him so he ends their relationship, calling her an evil woman. Claudette then leaves. Patrick supports Dot by booking a doctor's appointment and going with her.

Patrick is reunited with Yolande as he is celebrating his 77th birthday in The Queen Vic. Patrick and Yolande enjoy remembering old times and they flirt as they dance to Trinidadian music. Yolande later leaves for Birmingham and promises Patrick that they will keep in touch. Patrick befriends Ted Murray (Christopher Timothy) and they start playing chess together, and Patrick reveals that he has an internet girlfriend called Renee. Patrick wins a large sum of money on a bet, which he plans to use to see Renee in Trinidad, but he gives the money to Ted so he can go to Australia to see his son. Denise then finds out that Renee has been divorced several times, all from Caribbean expatriates in the UK, so warns Patrick.

In July 2019, Patrick goes on holiday again to Trinidad. Later, he returns in September, alongside new wife, Sheree Trueman (Suzette Llewellyn). Denise is initially cautious of Sheree and warns Patrick against her, however he reassures her. Sheree notices Ted is lonely following the sudden death of his wife Joyce (Maggie Steed), and so sets him up with her mother Wanda Baptiste (Anni Domingo). In January 2020, Isaac Baptiste (Stevie Basaula) arrives in Walford and is later revealed to be Sheree's son. Patrick is later revealed as his father, having slept with Sheree over 30 years earlier. In 2020, Lucas returns to Albert Square and fearing that he might hurt Denise or her young son Raymond Dawkins (Michael Jose Pomares Calixte), Patrick asks Phil to attack Lucas. This proves successful, however when Lucas comes looking for answers, unbeknown to him, Denise has temporarily moved in with her civil partner Jack Branning (Scott Maslen), and instead talks with Patrick, where he confesses to Lucas. Patrick becomes more angry with Lucas and eventually collapses, suffering another stroke. Lucas reluctantly calls an ambulance and flees the scene. Patrick is rushed to hospital and later slowly says Lucas' name, revealing to Denise that he was at the scene and needs to be found.

In 2023, Patrick gets back together with Yolande after she returns to Walford when her ex partner Anton finds out about Patrick and Yolande’s affair. Patrick goes on holiday to Trinidad in early 2024, during which time Yolande becomes closer with her Pastor, Gideon Clayton (Howard Saddler); when he returns, Pastor Clayton sexually assaults Yolande, which Yolande initially keeps a secret. Patrick supports Yolande when she confides in him about the assault, and is pleased when Clayton is arrested and charged. When Clayton commits suicide in September 2024, Patrick becomes concerned for Yolande as she rejects her faith and becomes distant from him, even forgetting the 20th anniversary of Paul's death. Yolande recovers her faith after attending a meeting with other victims of Clayton; the two reconcile and attend the Christmas carol concert on the Square on Christmas Eve 2024.

In June 2025, Patrick and Yolande become engaged once again. Patrick begins to gamble, much to Yolande's annoyance, and she threatens to call off the wedding. Patrick and Howie Danes (Delroy Atkinson) secretly bet money on a horse race, which they win. Oscar Branning (Pierre Counihan-Moullier) overhears Patrick and Yolande talking about the money, and when the house is empty, he attempts to steal it. Patrick catches him, but Oscar pushes him, causing him to fall unconscious. Patrick recovers but develops anxiety; a guilty Oscar befriends him and helps Patrick regain confidence. Patrick is delighted when Anthony returns for the upcoming wedding, but is furious when he learns that Patrick was attacked. Oscar confesses, and while Anthony urges Patrick to report him, Patrick is persuaded by Howie to drop the charges. Patrick later tells Yolande that he wants to postpone the wedding. However Patrick change his mind following a heart-to-heart with Yolande and they remarry in September 2025.

Patrick's joy continues as Anthony chooses to stay in Walford to resume his career as a general practitioner, but is horrified when he learns Anthony has separated from his wife Sophie, who has a restraining order against him over allegations of Anthony's controlling behaviour. This strains Patrick's relationship with his son, which is exacerbated on Christmas Day 2025 when he learns that Anthony had lied to Zoe Slater (Michelle Ryan) about the death of their twin babies in 2006. Patrick furiously disowns his son, claiming that he wished he had died instead of Paul, leading a distraught Anthony to storm out. Later that night, Anthony dies in the Queen Vic, seemingly murdered by Zoe, leaving Patrick devastated. Zoe is arrested for Anthony's murder, but it transpires that it was their daughter Jasmine Fisher (Indeyarna Donaldson-Holness) who had killed him after Anthony had attacked Zoe. Patrick meets and forms a relationship with Jasmine, but is horrified when Zoe's mother Kat Moon (Jessie Wallace) turns Jasmine into the police. As Jasmine awaits trial, Patrick meets his grandson Josh Goodwin (Joshua Vaughan), to whom he becomes close. Patrick goes on holiday to Trinidad after providing recorded testimony for the trial, but Jasmine is found not guilty and released. After returning from Trinidad, Patrick goes to visit his daughter-in-law Sophie and grandchildren in Scotland, as they are struggling to cope with Anthony's death. Patrick returns a few weeks later to discover Denise is suffering from a devastating case of acute myeloid leukaemia.

== Other appearances ==
Patrick also makes cameo appearances in the Internet spin-off series EastEnders: E20. In series 1, Fatboy (Ricky Norwood) convinces Patrick to sell him alcohol from the shop, despite having no identification. In episode 3 of series 2, Stevie Dickinson (Amanda Fairbank-Hynes) attempts to buy drinks from Patrick in the shop but her payment card is declined. In episode 5, Naz Mehmet (Emaa Hussen) goes to the shop asking for items of food that Patrick does not sell, and he asks her not to shop there anymore. She later asks him if he has seen Stevie.

== Reception ==
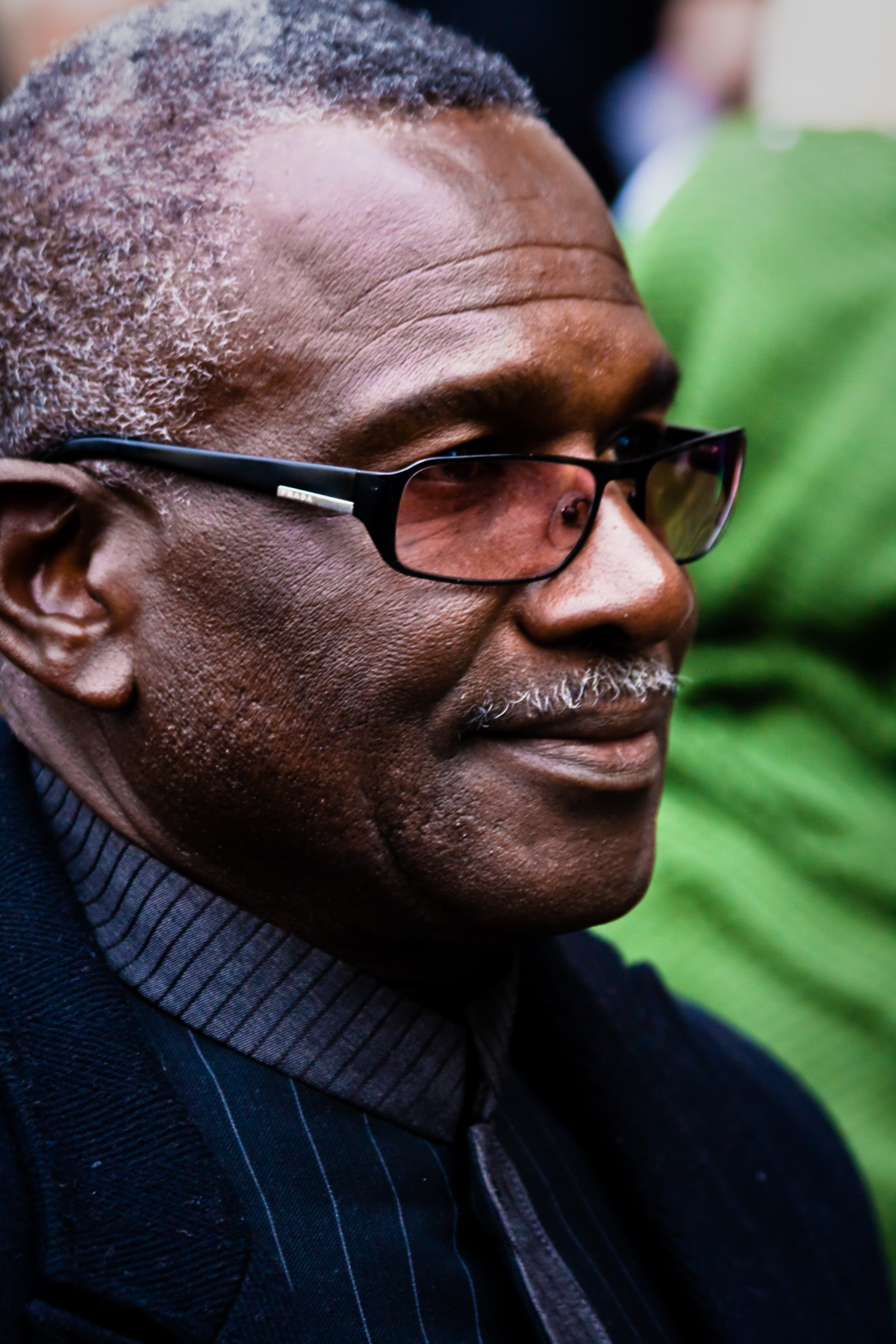
Rudolph Walker (pictured) was awarded the "Outstanding Achievement Award" for his portrayal of Patrick at The British Soap Awards in 2018.

Following the airing of EastEnders' first all-black cast episode in the show's history in 2009, the BBC received criticism for not adequately advertising the event. The programme-makers refuted these claims, insisting that the storyline received the same publicity treatment as the soap's other ongoing plots. A spokesperson told media website Digital Spy: "Everyone at Elstree has been truly shocked and surprised by the attention that an episode with an all-black cast has had, given that we live in such a diverse and multicultural society. [The] episode focuses on Patrick Trueman sharing his experiences of being a young man living in 1950s Britain with the family he lives with (the Foxes) which does mean it is solely an all-black cast on screen. Patrick and the Foxes are an integral part of Albert Square and this is no different from other episodes where we've concentrated on one particular family or storyline in the past." Additionally, the BBC received "183 complaints about the episode's 'unnecessary' content, while some viewers felt aggrieved by the nature of an 'all-black' cast. Some 57 complaints, meanwhile, were logged before it aired." The BBC responded, "It is not unusual for EastEnders to devote a whole episode to a single storyline or set of characters, and this episode was one of these occasions. This was an opportunity to explore in some depth the background and experiences of Patrick Trueman, one of EastEnders' longest-standing and most popular characters. There have been many 'all-white' episodes in the show's 24-year history, and we do not believe there is any reason why an 'all-black' episode should not be included within the series. Some viewers felt it was unnecessary to raise the subject of the Notting Hill race riots. These form part of the character's experience, as well as British history, and we feel it was absolutely legitimate for these characters to discuss them."

For his role as Patrick, Walker was longlisted for "Best Actor" at the 2014 Inside Soap Awards. On 2 June 2018, Walker was awarded the "Outstanding Achievement Award" at The British Soap Awards 2018 for portraying the role of Patrick for 17 years.

In 2020, Sara Wallis and Ian Hyland from The Daily Mirror placed Patrick 24th on their ranked list of the best EastEnders characters of all time, saying that he has "always been the go-to guy for a friend in need" with his "trademark trilby, twinkly eyes and taste for rum", as well as calling the mystery attack on him "vicious". Marianna Manson from Closer Online put Patrick on her list of the 11 most iconic black characters in British soap operas, writing, "It wouldn't be a list of iconic Black characters without EastEnders' own Patrick Trueman. During his twenty year reign on the show, Pat has become one of the most loved faces on the Square thanks to his enduring fatherly love for Denise and Kim Fox and his cheerful disposition. An all round lovely man, Patrick is often the voice or reason and hope amid plenty of dark storylines."

== See also ==
- List of EastEnders: E20 characters
