= The Anti-Slavery Society Convention, 1840 =

Painting by Benjamin Robert Haydon

- Artist: Benjamin Robert Haydon
- Year: 1841
- Type: Oil on canvas, history painting
- Dimensions: 755 cm × 974 cm (297.2 in × 383.6 in)
- Location: National Portrait Gallery, London

The Anti-Slavery Society Convention, 1840 is an 1841 history painting by the British artist Benjamin Robert Haydon. It depicts the World Anti-Slavery Convention, an abolitionist meeting held at the Freemasons' Tavern in London.

== Event ==
Organised by the British and Foreign Anti-Slavery Society, it opened on 12 June 1840. Although the British Empire had abolished slavery in 1833, it continued to be widely practiced across the world, notably in the United States. A number of American abolitionists travelled to London to take part in the gathering. Haydon attended the opening day as a witness after being commissioned by some Quaker attendees to commemorate the event. Haydon was noted for his history scenes, and had previously produced a large-scale mass portrait for the 1834 painting The Reform Banquet.

== Painting ==
Haydon chose as the moment of his painting the rousing address of the chairman Thomas Clarkson, veteran of the battles against slavery and the slave trade of the eighteenth century. Over the next five days he sketched fifty two portrait heads. He was given a full list of 103 names to add to the composition, although a further thirty were added by the time he finished. A proposal to allow woman delegates to attend the meeting as delegates was rejected in a vote and so they attended as observers. Haydon took the historical liberty of adding nine of them in prominent positions for his painting as though they had been full participants.

== Subjects ==
Notable figures featured include the Irish MP Daniel O'Connell, Amelia Opie, former slaves Edward (Jonas) Barrett and Henry Beckford. Haydon was fascinated when Lady Byron, the widow of the poet, sat for him. The painting was exhibited at the Egyptian Hall in Piccadilly, where it received a mixed reception from critics. Today the painting is in the National Portrait Gallery in London, having been given in 1880 by the British and Foreign Anti-Slavery Society.

== Bibliography ==
- May, Stephen J. Voyage of The Slave Ship: J.M.W. Turner's Masterpiece in Historical Context. McFarland, 2016.
- O'Keeffe, Paul. A Genius for Failure: The life of Benjamin Robert Haydon. Random House, 2011.
