= Edward Barrett (slave) =

American slave

Edward (Jonas) Barrett was a formerly enslaved person from Jamaica. He attended the World Anti-Slavery Convention in London on the 12–23 June 1840. He is depicted in the painting entitled "The Anti-Slavery Society Convention, 1840" by artist Benjamin Robert Haydon.

The character of Jonas Barrett, a former slave who escaped from Virginia, United States, was played by actor Cornell John in the British TV series Victoria shown on PBS MASTERPIECE.
