= Jo Joyner =

English actress (born 1977)

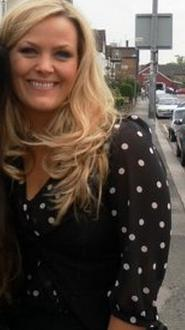
- Joyner in 2011
- Born: Joanne Mary Joyner; 24 May 1977 (age 49); Harlow, Essex, England
- Education: Royal Welsh College of Music & Drama
- Occupation: Actress
- Years active: 1999–present
- Television: No Angels; EastEnders; Marley's Ghosts; Ackley Bridge; Shakespeare & Hathaway: Private Investigators
- Spouse: Neil Madden (m. 2007)
- Children: 2

Joanne Mary Joyner (born 24 May 1977) is an English actress. She is known for her roles as Tanya Branning in the BBC One soap opera EastEnders and Mandy Carter in the Channel 4 school drama Ackley Bridge. From 2018, she has starred as Luella Shakespeare in the BBC crime drama series Shakespeare & Hathaway: Private Investigators.

== Early life and education ==
In 1999, she graduated from the Royal Welsh College of Music & Drama in Cardiff with a BA degree in Acting.

== Career ==
After a stint of guest roles in shows such as Always and Everyone, The Cops, Heartbeat and Clocking Off, Joyner came to prominence after playing Beth Nicholls in Channel 4 comedy drama No Angels between 2004 and 2006. She later appeared in four episodes of North & South as Fanny Thornton and in two episodes of Doctor Who as Lynda Moss. In June 2006, Joyner began appearing as Tanya Branning in BBC One soap opera EastEnders. Joyner originally turned down the role on the show as she had doubts over whether she could work in a soap opera. Having worked quietly and successfully in the industry for eight years, Joyner was unsure if she would be comfortable with the level of fame being on EastEnders would bring her. She won the Most Popular Actress award at the Digital Spy Soap Awards in 2008 for the part of Tanya and also went on to win Best Dramatic Performance at the 2008 British Soap Awards, as well as making the final four in the Best Actress category. Joyner was nominated for the Best Actress award at the All About Soap Awards in 2012; she later won the award. In 2012, Joyner and co-star Jake Wood won the Best On-Screen Partnership category at the British Soap Awards. On Digital Spy's 2012 end of year reader poll, Joyner was nominated for Best Female Soap Actor and came fourth with 13.4% of the vote.

Whilst still appearing in EastEnders in 2011, Joyner appeared in BBC One comedy drama Candy Cabs as Jackie O’Sullivan. On 1 May 2012, it was reported that Joyner would take a prolonged break from EastEnders at the end of her current contract to spend time with her family. However, on 1 April 2013, it was announced that Joyner's departure would be indefinite as she wished to try new career paths. Joyner filmed her final scenes on 15 May 2013. She departed the show on 28 June 2013. Joyner reprised the role of Tanya in EastEnders for the 30th anniversary specials in February 2015 and again on Christmas Day 2017 as part of the storyline surrounding the exits of her onscreen daughters.

In June 2017, Joyner began portraying Mandy Carter in Channel 4’s drama Ackley Bridge. She departed from the series in the fourth series in 2021. In February 2018, she started to play Luella Shakespeare, alongside Mark Benton, in the BBC One comedy drama Shakespeare & Hathaway: Private Investigators.

In December 2021, Joyner appeared in the Netflix drama series Stay Close as Erin Cartwright. Then in 2022, she starred in the Channel 5 drama series Riptide. In May 2025, she played the on-duty doctor, Elizabeth Burgess, who must make the difficult decision whether to call social services or not, on a mother and her friend, Jess (Diane Kruger), who brings her child into A&E with an unexplainable injury in the Paramount+ show Little Disasters.

== Personal life ==
Joyner married Neil Madden in 2007. She announced in July 2009 that she was pregnant as a result of IVF treatment. She gave birth to twins, Edie and Fred.

== Filmography ==
Year	Title	Role	Notes
2000	Always and Everyone	Nurse	
2001	The Cops	Carly Eaden	
2001	Heartbeat	Anna Young	Episode: "The Buxton Defence"
2002	Night Flight	Brigitte	Television film
2002	Clocking Off	Tina	Episode: "Gary's Story"
2002–2003	Ed Stone Is Dead	Lisa	Main role
2003	Serious & Organised	Louise Adamson	Episode: "Unfaithful"
2003	Spooks	Stephanie Mills	Episode: "I Spy Apocalypse"
2003	Silent Witness	Cathy Mottram	2 episodes
2004	Fat Friends	Kirsty Grigg	Episode: "Bacon, Bagels and the Bishop"
2004–2006	No Angels	Beth Nicholls	Main role
2004	Pretending to be Judith	Shop Assistant	Television film
2004	Three Ivans, Two Aunts and an Overcoat	Masha	Main role
2004	North & South	Fanny Thornton	Main role
2005	Doctor Who	Lynda Moss	2 episodes: "Bad Wolf" / "The Parting of the Ways"
2005	Swinging	Various roles	Main role
2006–2013, 2015, 2017–2018	EastEnders	Tanya Branning	679 episodes
2010, 2014	Loose Women	Herself	5 episodes
2011	Candy Cabs	Jackie O'Sullivan	Main role
2013	Moving On	Theresa	Episode: "The House"
2014	Trying Again	Meg	Main role
2014	Murdoch Mysteries	Cecily McKinnon	2 episodes
2015	Ordinary Lies	Beth	Main role
2015	The Interceptor	Lorna	Main role
2015–2016	Marley's Ghosts	Vicar	Main role
2016	The Confessions of Dorian Gray	Constance Wilde	4 episodes
2016–2017	Mount Pleasant	Jayne	Main role
2017–2021	Ackley Bridge	Mandy Carter	Main role
2017	Be Lucky	Ruth	Main role
2017	Porters	Dr Kelly	Main role
2018–present	Shakespeare & Hathaway: Private Investigators	Luella Shakespeare	Main role
2018	Hang Ups	Clare Maynard	1 episode
2019	The Reluctant Landlord	Sarah	Episode: "Christmas Special"
2020	Queen Bee	Laura / Stella	Film
2021	Stay Close	Erin Cartwright	Main role
2022	Riptide	Alison	Main role
2023	For Her Sins	Laura Conroy	Main role
2024	The Wives	Beth Morgan	Main role
2025	Little Disasters	Dr. Elizabeth Burgess	Main role
2026	Time (2021 TV series)	Nicola	Supporting role

== Awards and nominations ==
Year	Award	Category	Nominated work	Result	Ref
	Royal Welsh College of Music & Drama	'Friends’ prize for acting'	The woman who walked into doors	Won	
2006	Rose d'Or	Best Female Comedy Performer	Swinging	Won	
2007	M.E.N. Theatre Awards	Best Fringe Performer	Raw	Nominated	
2007	National Television Awards	Most Popular Newcomer	EastEnders	Shortlisted	
2007	Inside Soap Awards	Best Newcomer	EastEnders	Shortlisted	
2007	TV Quick and Choice Awards	Best Soap Actress	EastEnders	Nominated	
2007	TV Quick and Choice Awards	Best Newcomer	EastEnders	Nominated	
2008	Digital Spy Soap Awards	Most Popular Actress	EastEnders	Won	
2008	British Soap Awards	Best Actress	EastEnders	Nominated	
2008	British Soap Awards	Best Dramatic Performance	EastEnders	Won	
2008	All About Soap Bubble Awards	Best Slap (with Lacey Turner)	EastEnders	Won	
2008	All About Soap Bubble Awards	Best Tearjerker	EastEnders	Won	
2008	All About Soap Bubble Awards	Fatal Attraction (with Rob Kazinsky)	EastEnders	Nominated	
2008	Inside Soap Awards	Best Actress	EastEnders	Longlisted	
2008	Inside Soap Awards	Best Dramatic Performance	EastEnders	Shortlisted	
2009	All About Soap Bubble Awards	I'm A Survivor	EastEnders	Nominated	
2009	British Soap Awards	Best Actress	EastEnders	Nominated	
2009	TV Now Awards	Favourite Female Soap Star	EastEnders	Nominated	
2010	TV Now Awards	Favourite Soap Family	EastEnders	Nominated	
2011	Inside Soap Awards	Best Wedding	EastEnders	Longlisted	
2011	Inside Soap Awards	Sexiest Female	EastEnders	Shortlisted	
2011	RTS North West Awards	Best Performance in a Comedy	Candy Cabs	Nominated	
2011	Digital Spy Readers' Awards	Best Soap Actress	EastEnders	Won	
2012	TRIC Awards	TV Soap Personality	EastEnders	Nominated	
2012	Digital Spy Readers' Awards	Best Female Soap Actor	EastEnders	Nominated	
2012	All About Soap Awards	Best Actress	EastEnders	Won	
2012	All About Soap Awards	Best Couple (with Jake Wood)	EastEnders	Won	
2012	British Soap Awards	Best Actress	EastEnders	Shortlisted	
2012	British Soap Awards	Best Dramatic Performance	EastEnders	Won	
2012	British Soap Awards	Best On-Screen Partnership (with Jake Wood)	EastEnders	Won	
2012	TV Choice Awards	Best Soap Actress	EastEnders	Shortlisted	
2013	British Soap Awards	Best Dramatic Performance	EastEnders	Nominated	
2015	RTS North West Awards	Best Performance in a Single Drama or Drama Series (Female)	Ordinary Lies	Shortlisted	
2015	Digital Spy Readers Awards	Funniest Soap Moment	Eastenders	Won	
2018	RTS Midlands Awards	Female Acting Performance	Shakespeare & Hathaway: Private Investigators	Nominated	
2021	TV Choice Awards	Best Actress	Ackley Bridge	Nominated	
