= Ann Mitchell =

British actress (born 1939)

- Born: 22 April 1939 (age 87); Stepney, London, England
- Education: East 15 Acting School
- Occupation: Actress
- Years active: 1958–present
- Spouse(s): William Chiles (1959–?) (divorced); Robert Walker (1965–?) (divorced)
- Children: 2, including Ché Walker
- Website: www.annmitchell.net

Ann Mitchell (born 22 April 1939) is a British stage and television actress. She came to prominence in the 1980s when she starred as Dolly Rawlins in the crime series Widows as well as the sequels Widows 2 and She's Out, all written by Lynda La Plante. In 2011, she was cast as Cora Cross in the BBC soap opera EastEnders, the mother of Tanya Cross and Rainie Cross. Mitchell has appeared in many roles in film, theatre and television and has played a significant number of major roles such as Mrs. Warren in Mrs. Warren's Profession and her Laurence Olivier Award nominated performance in Through the Leaves.

== Early and personal life ==
Mitchell was born on 22 April 1939 at the Royal London Hospital. She attended Raine's Foundation School and went on to train at East 15 Acting School, having received the first ever scholarship to the school. She has since worked in theatre, television, film and radio, starting with Diary of a Young Man, a series written for her by John McGrath and Troy Kennedy Martin, directed by Ken Loach.

She is a visiting lecturer at the Guildhall School of Music and Drama, East 15 Acting School and the Royal Academy of Dramatic Art, and is Master Tutor on the foundation course at WAC. Mitchell is on the board of directors of the Unity Theatre Trust, a Trustee of Arbours (a psychotherapeutic care centre) and is a Patron of Clean Break, a theatre and training company for female ex-offenders.

Mitchell has been married twice and has two sons, one from each of her marriages, one of whom is the actor Ché Walker. She resides in London.

== Career ==
In 1984, she received the Pye Award for Female who had the greatest impact on television, for her role as Dolly Rawlins in the crime series Widows, written by Lynda La Plante. (She had a cameo, as Amanda's mother, in the 2018 U.S. film version of her series, Widows.)

In 1992, she received the award "Performance of the Year" by The Independent on Sunday for her Hecuba at the Gate Theatre. In 2003 Mitchell was a nominee for Best Actress in both the Evening Standard Awards and the Laurence Olivier Awards for her performance as Martha in Through the Leaves, first produced at the Southwark Playhouse and later the Duchess Theatre, London.

Her work as a director and writer includes: Voices from Prison (RSC Platform), Cathy Come Home (first stage adaptation, Pit Theatre), Ever After (co-written with Cathy Itzin), Kiss and Kill (co-written with Susan Todd for Monstrous Regiment and nominated for the Susan Smith Blackburn Prize). She directed the world premiere of Barrie Keeffe's Sus, at the Royal Court Theatre.

Ann Mitchell first worked with Simon Callow over 35 years ago in a Lincoln Theatre Royal production of The Erpingham Camp, where Callow made his debut. Since then, they have worked together several times, most recently eight years ago when Callow directed Mitchell in The Destiny of Me at the Leicester Haymarket.

While not collaborating with Callow, Mitchell has built up an extensive stage career. In an interview with What's on Stage, Mitchell commented that her favourite playwright was Eugene O'Neill. "I was about 15 when I first started reading him and, even at that age, I knew there was something going on there in the subconscious of his work. Tennessee Williams, because of his delicacy. I also like doing Racine, which is wonderful from the point of the view of the language. I've just done 'Britannicus' at the Citz."

== Roles ==
=== EastEnders ===
In 2011, Mitchell was cast in the British soap opera EastEnders as Cora Cross, the mother of already established characters Tanya Jessop and Rainie Cross. She first appeared to attend her on-screen daughter's wedding and was originally only scheduled to appear for a four episode guest stint. On 31 May 2011 it was announced that Mitchell was returning to EastEnders as Cora and will be back on screen as a regular character in summer 2011. In an interview with Inside Soap, the executive producer of EastEnders, Bryan Kirkwood commented: "With the loss of Barbara Windsor, I was keen to find a new matriarch for the show, and Ann Mitchell is a dream booking. I've always been a fan of her work, and with the storyline we've got planned, we'll wonder how we ever did without Cora". Mitchell had previously appeared in EastEnders as Jane Williams, a woman Roy Evans had an affair with but only appeared for six episodes. Upon joining the soap, Mitchell commented: "As a lifelong fan of EastEnders I am thrilled to join the cast. I am a great fan of June Brown’s and am looking forward to sharing some scenes with her." Executive Producer Bryan Kirkwood added, "I’m very excited to have the much-loved Ann Mitchell joining us. Cora Cross is a formidable woman, cut from the same cloth as many glorious Walford women of the past, and Ann Mitchell is just perfect for the role." She took a break in December 2015, and returned in 2017.

She returned for a brief stint unannounced in March 2026.

=== Other roles ===
==== Theatre ====
As a leading member of the ground-breaking Citizens' Theatre for many years, Mitchell's roles included at Glasgow: Mother Courage in Mother Courage and Her Children, Helen in A Taste of Honey, Amanda in Private Lives, Mary in Mary Stuart, Eva in Summit Conference (written for her by Robert David McDonald), Mrs Warren in Mrs. Warren's Profession, Gertrude in Hamlet and Agrippina in Britannicus. At London: Mrs Marwood in The Way of the World and Cornelia in The White Devil.

==== Royal Shakespeare Company ====
For the Royal Shakespeare Company her roles include Hecuba, Aethra and the nurse in Tantalus at the Barbican (RSC), Frieda Lawrence in Divine Gossip, and the Woman in Edward Bond's War Plays I, II, III. Tantalus was a coproduction of the RSC and the Denver Center for the Performing Arts in the U.S. where it received its world premiere in a mammoth performance of the three parts given over 10 hours. Working for the leading companies in the UK she was: Helen in The Road to Mecca (Royal Exchange Theatre, Manchester), Mrs Malaprop in The Rivals (Nottingham Playhouse), Marge in A Colder Climate (Royal Court), A Matter of Life and Death (Royal National Theatre), Brenda in Mary Barnes (Royal Court), Guinevere in Guinevere (written for her by Pam Gems, Soho Poly), Mrs Prentice in What the Butler Saw (the Crucible Theatre, Sheffield). In 2005, she co-starred in Whose Life Is It Anyway? in London's West End with Kim Cattrall and Janet Suzman.

==== Television ====
For television, Mitchell has starred in many of the most popular UK television series ranging from drama to comedy, including Z-Cars, Talking to a Stranger, Up the Junction, Play for Today, Upstairs, Downstairs, Morning Story, Within These Walls, Bergerac, Taggart, The Detectives, Kavanagh QC, Maigret, The Bill, EastEnders, French & Saunders, and Gimme Gimme Gimme (written for her by Jonathan Harvey). She co-stars as Lillian in the forthcoming Granada production of Jane Hall's Big Bad Bus Ride, and was most recently seen as Rita in Tunnel of Love for Thames. As Dolly Rawlins in Widows I, II and She's Out (written for her by Lynda La Plante) she won acclaim and affection. In 2017 she joined the cast of CBBC's Hetty Feather. On 16 January 2022 she appeared in Vera in the episode "As the Crow Flies" in the role of Moira Swann.

== Filmography ==
Key
†	Denotes films that have not yet been released

Year	Title	Role	Notes
1964	Z-Cars	Mrs Napier	
1965	The Wednesday Play	Marie	
1966	Dixon of Dock Green	Mrs Stubbings	
1966	Talking to a Stranger	Mother as a young woman	
1966	Theatre 625	Mother as a young woman	
1967	Hobson's Choice	Ada Figgins	
1973	Play for Today	Amenities officer	
1975	Upstairs, Downstairs	Militant Woman	
1975	Crown Court	Vera Chadwick	
1975–1976	Within These Walls	Kathleen Marsh	
1977	Full Circle	Woman in park	Feature film
1978	Angels	Sister Huntley	
1979	Murder by Decree	Jane	Feature film
1976	Play of the Week	Mother	
1981	Lady Chatterley's Lover	Ivy Bolton	Feature film
1983–1985	Widows	Dolly Rawlins	
1988	Bergerac	Lola Betts	
1990, 1991, 1994, 2000, 2008	The Bill	Miss Alexander; Mrs Cook; Sue Cooper; Val Davies; Doreen Fallon	
1990, 2009	Casualty	Mrs McKenzie; Margaret Samson	
1992	Taggart	Annie Gilmore	
1992	Maigret	Mme. Moncin	
1995	She's Out	Dolly Rawlins	
1996	The Detectives	Superintendent Simmons	
1998	Kavanagh QC	Mrs Justice Addis	
2001	Gimme Gimme Gimme	Miss Twitch	
2001–2002, 2011–2015, 2017–2018, 2026	EastEnders	Jane Williams; Cora Cross	
2006	Jane Hall	Lilian Ramsay	
2008	Heartbeat	Iris Grocott	
2011	The Deep Blue Sea	Mrs Nelson	Feature film
2015	Dragonfly	Margaret Grosvenor	
2017	Hetty Feather	Miss Sarah Smith	
2018	Widows	Amanda's Mother	Feature film
2019–2020	Call the Midwife	Elsie Dyer	
2019	Year of the Rabbit	Gwendoline	
2021	Gunfight at Dry River	Etta Ryles	
2021	Silent Witness	Molly Trask	
2022	Vera	Moira Swann	
2023	The Gold	Sadie	
2023	For Her Sins	Maggie	
2023	True Haunting	Myra Danvers	
2026	Merry Christmas Aubrey Flint	Sadie	Feature film

== Awards and nominations ==
Year	Award	Category	Result	Ref.
2012	Inside Soap Awards	Funniest Female	Nominated	
2013	18th National Television Awards	Serial Drama Performance	Nominated	
