= Clare Perkins =

British actress

- Born: England
- Occupation: Actress
- Years active: 1985–present

Clare Perkins is an English actress, known for her roles as Denise Boulter in Family Affairs and Ava Hartman in EastEnders.

== Career ==
=== TV ===
Perkins' first role was as Opal in the 1991 TV film Hallelujah Anyhow in the Screen Two strand. On TV she has appeared in Family Affairs, All in the Game, My Wonderful Life, Pig Heart Boy, Casualty, EastEnders, Men Behaving Badly, Big Women, and Clapham Junction.

She played the role of Ava Hartman in EastEnders.

She played Kerene Nagashi in the Amazon fantasy series The Wheel of Time.

In 2021, she appeared in the horror film Censor, and stars in the TV comedy-drama The Outlaws, which was first broadcast in that year.

Perkins plays Carla McLain in the Apple+ science fiction drama series Silo from 2023.

=== Radio ===
Perkins has been a member of the BBC Radio Drama Company, and played the character of Mel for eight years in the BBC World Service soap Westway.

In 2011, she performed in many radio dramas for Radio 4, including The Winter House, Landfall, Corrinne Come Back and Gone, and Best Intentions.

From 2021, she played Denise Metcalf, a veterinary nurse, in the long-running radio soap opera The Archers.

=== Film ===
Her film credits include Jill in the Palme d'Or-winning Ladybird, Ladybird (Ken Loach), Secrets & Lies (Mike Leigh), Bullet Boy (Saul Dibb) and 7 Lives. She played Beverly in the film Bullet Boy, which opened the London Film Festival in 2004; she won Best Actress for this role at the Screen Nation Awards.

=== Stage ===
Perkins has appeared on stage in many theatres, such as the Royal Court, Young Vic, National Theatre, and Soho Theatre. Perkins was in two West End productions in 2019 – Emilia which transferred from The Globe, and Sweat, which transferred from the Donmar Warehouse, with the consequence that at one point her face was on the front of two West End theatres simultaneously for a month, The Vaudeville and The Gielgud; it is believed that she is the only actress to achieve this.

== Filmography ==
=== Film ===
Year	Title	Role	Notes
1994	Ladybird, Ladybird	Jill	
1996	Secrets & Lies	Hortense's Sister-in-Law	
2004	Bullet Boy	Beverley	
2006	Shoot the Messenger	Mary Gibbs	
2007	Deadmeat	De Costa	
2009	Normal: The Düsseldorf Ripper	Nurse Susan	
2011	7 Lives	Kids Mum	
2016	Kaleidoscope	Launderette Assistant	
2018	Been So Long	Snowqueen	
2021	Censor	Anne	
2022	Medusa Deluxe	Cleve	
TBA	Love Without Walls	Faye	Post-production

=== Television ===
Year	Title	Role	Notes
1991	Screen Two	Opal	Episode: "Hallelujah Anyhow"
1993	Grange Hill	Marcia	Episode: "Series 16, Episode 10"
1994	The Bill	Delia Fisher	Episode: "Skinning Cats"
1997	Men Behaving Badly	Deborah's Friend	Episode: "Stag Night"
1997	EastEnders	Darts Team Leader	1 episode
1997–1999	My Wonderful Life	Bridget Groves	Series regular
1998	Big Women	Cleo	Episode: "A Nest of Randy Vipers"
1999	Pig Heart Boy	Cathy Kelsey	Main role
2000	Whole New Heart	Cameron's Mother	TV film
2001	Always and Everyone	Gloria Edmunds	Episode: "Series 3, Episode 10"
2001	Merseybeat	Joy Patterson	Episode: "Deep End"
2001	Casualty	Bernice Healey	Episode: "On the Edge"
2002	Doctors	Miriam Akinbiyi	Episode: "Happy Days Are Here Again"
2003–2005	Family Affairs	Denise Boulter	Main role
2006	Holby City	Gabrielle Horner	Episode: "Brother's Keeper"
2006	All in the Game	Mrs. Lamone	TV film
2007	The Bill	Olivia Vaughan	Episode: "Day of Reckoning"
2007	Talk to Me	Childminder	Episode: "The Wedding"
2007	Clapham Junction	Dolly	TV film
2008	Casualty	Rachel O'Hara	Episode: "Sex and Death"
2011	Holby City	Simone Tait	Recurring role, 7 episodes
2011	Doctors	Lorraine Greenhall	Episode: "Hitting the Wall"
2012	BBC Learning: True Stories	Rosa Parks	Episode: Episode 1.2
2012–2013	EastEnders	Ava Hartman	Series regular
2018	Doctors	Ellen Morrison	Episode: "The Woman Who Runs"
2018	Death in Paradise	Fabienne Jordan	Episode: "The Healer"
2020	Flack	Shirelle	Episode: "Sofi"
2020	The Crown	Social Worker	Episode: "Fagan"
2021	The Outlaws	Myrna Okeke	Main role
2021	The Wheel of Time	Kerene Nagashi	Main role
2023–present	Silo	Carla	Main role
2025	The Guest	Annette	Recurring role

== Theatre ==
Year	Play	Role	Venue	Notes
1990	Meridian	Meridian	Contact Theatre, Manchester	
1996	Mules	Bridie	Royal Court Theatre, London	with Clean Break
1997	Ready or Not	Various roles	Theatre Royal Stratford East, London	
2001	Generations of the Dead	Lenore	Young Vic, London	
2002	Cyrano de Bergerac	Lise/Mother/Usherette	Nuffield Theatre, Southampton	
2002	Our Country's Good	Liz Morden/Lieutenant Dawes	Nuffield Theatre, Southampton	
2006	Fabulation	Mother/Caseworker/Inmate	Tricycle Theatre, London	
2006	How Long Is Never? Darfur – A Response		Tricycle Theatre, London	
2008	A Fag Burning the Carpet		King's Head Theatre, London	
2008	Any Which Way	Sylvia	Only Connect Theatre, London	
2009	The Hounding of David Oluwale	Alice/Patience	West Yorkshire Playhouse, Leeds	with "Eclipse Theatre"
2009	The Caucasian Chalk Circle		West Yorkshire Playhouse – Leeds, Richmond Theatre – London, Nottingham Playhouse – Nottingham & Unicorn Theatre – London	with Shared Experience
2010	Welcome to Thebes	Helia/Aglaea	Olivier Theatre, London	
2012	Neighbours	Manny	HighTide Festival, Aldeburgh	
2012	The Rover	Moretta	Hampton Court Palace, London	with "Artluxe Ltd"
2014	How to Be Immortal	Henrietta Lacks/Deborah Lacks/Loretta Pleasant	UK tour	with "Penny Dreadful Theatre"
2014	The House That Will Not Stand	Marie Josephine	Tricycle Theatre, London	
2014	Twelve	Teacher	UK tour	with "Kali Theatre"
2014	Little Revolution	Elaine	Almeida Theatre, London	
2015	The Curious Incident of the Dog in the Night-Time	Mrs Shears/Mrs Gascoyne	Cottesloe Theatre, London	also, UK tour
2016	Play On		Almeida Theatre, London	
2016	Removal Men	Beatrice	The Yard Theatre, London	
2017	The Convert	Mia Tamba	Gate Theatre, London	
2017	Roundelay	Ring Mistress	Southwark Playhouse, London	
2017	Primetime	Various roles	Royal Court Theatre, London	also, UK tour
2017	Nora	Krista	Project Arts Centre, Dublin	
2017	Three Mothers	Khady	Waterloo East Theatre, London	
2017	Daisy Pulls It Off	Monica/Belinda	Park Theatre, London	
2018	The Immigrant	Ama	Hoxton Hall, London	
2018	Genesis Inc	Larissa/Sharon	Hampstead Theatre, London	
2018	Mrs Dalloway	Clarissa Dalloway	Arcola Theatre, London	
2019	Sweat	Cynthia	Donmar Warehouse, London	
2019	Emilia	Emilia	Vaudeville Theatre, London	
2021	The Wife of Willesden	Alvita	Kiln Theatre, London	
