= Liam Macdonald =

Australian actor (born 1989)

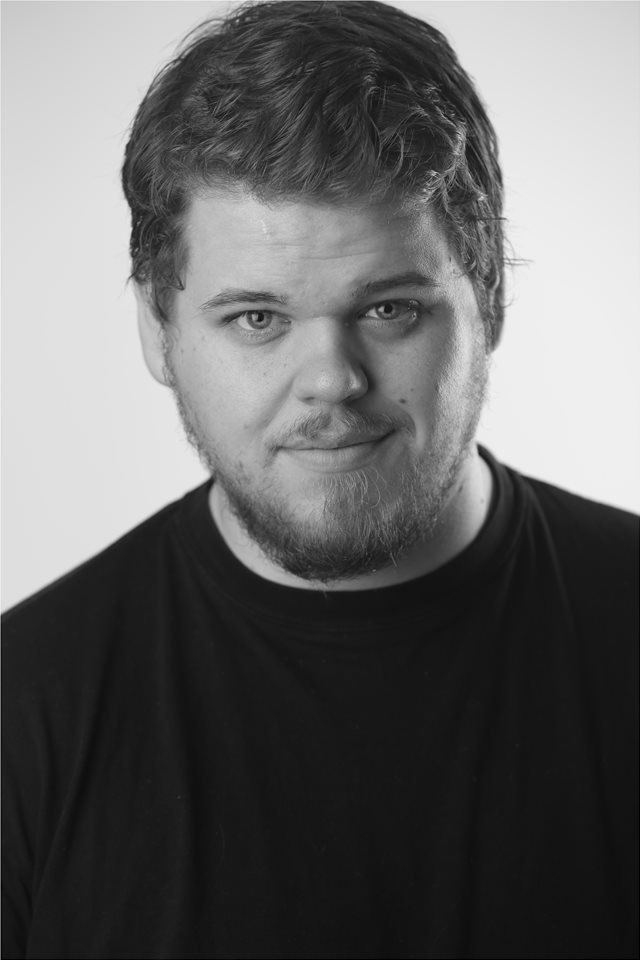
- Born: Liam Phillip Macdonald; 18 October 1989 (age 37); Adelaide, South Australia
- Years active: 2008–present
- Website: liammacdonald.info

Liam Phillip Macdonald (born 18 October 1989) is an Australian actor. He is best known for his role as the young Andre Roussimoff in Sky Arts' Urban Myths series, Fat Nerd in the comedy horror film American Burger and Larry Page in the Disney+ Hotstar web series The Great Indian Murder.

== Early life ==
Macdonald was born and raised in Adelaide, South Australia, to an English mother and a New Zealand father, and was educated at Pasadena High School. In 2007, Macdonald was accepted to Sydney Theatre School and early in 2008, he permanently moved to Sydney. At the end of his studies at Sydney Theatre School, he was presented with a Diploma of Theatre Performance. In 2010, he moved to London, England, where he currently resides.

== Acting ==
Encouraged by his high school drama to apply for drama school, Macdonald chose to become a professional actor upon graduating. He studied at Sydney Theatre School and graduated with a Diploma of Theatre Performance in 2008. Macdonald has since acted in a wide variety of Australian television and movies, most notably his portrayal of Constable Tim Dewey in Underbelly: The Golden Mile. Whilst first auditioning for a featured extra, the casting agent was so impressed with his audition that they offered him the role of the Constable Tim Dewey instead. He has also appeared in Home and Away, as a drunk Santa in Jimmy Barnes' music video from Before the Devil Knows You're Dead and as Norman in the Australian feature film The Unjudged, which was shown at the Melbourne International Film Festival in 2012.

In 2012, he portrayed "Fat Nerd" in the Swedish movie American Burger. Although American Burger received mixed reviews from critics, its technical aspects were praised, along with the audio and cinematography.

He has portrayed Andre Roussimoff in Sky Arts' Urban Myths series, appearing in the episode Waiting for Andre alongside David Threlfall in late 2016 and matricide killer Ross Taggart in the Channel 5 series Countdown to Murder.

In early 2020, he secured the role of Larry Page in the Disney+ Hotstar web series The Great Indian Murder, based on the book Six Suspects by Indian author Vikas Swarup. He was the last major character to be cast. The production company had found great difficulty in finding the right actor to play Larry, and he was personally sought out by director and writer Tigmanshu Dhulia for the role. After initial reluctance to audition for the role, which would require him to film in India for several weeks during the COVID-19 pandemic, he was convinced by his agent to audition. He was offered the role days later.

== Personal life ==
Macdonald is an avid sports fan and lifelong supporter of Southampton F.C. and can be often seen at games. He is also a lifelong supporter of the Philadelphia Eagles in the NFL and the New York Knicks of the NBA.

== Filmography ==
=== Films ===
Title	Year	Role	Notes
The Unjudged	2010	Norman Van der Berg	
I Am Cursed	2011	George Hayden	
Brash Young Turks	2012	Enthusiastic Sales Agent	
American Burger	2012	Fat Nerd	Released Worldwide: 17 October 2014

=== Television ===
Title	Year	Role	Notes
Underbelly: The Golden Mile	2009	Constable Tim Dewey	Episodes 6 & 12
Home and Away	2009	Teenage Crook	Episode 5078
Urban Myths	2016	Andre Roussimoff	Episode: Waiting for Andre
Countdown to Murder	2019	Ross Taggart	Episode: Carol Taggart: Mum is Missing
The Great Indian Murder	2022-	Larry Page	

=== Theatre ===
Title	Year	Role
The Shakesperience Too	2015	Dogberry
