= The Great Indian Murder (TV series) =

Indian crime drama web series

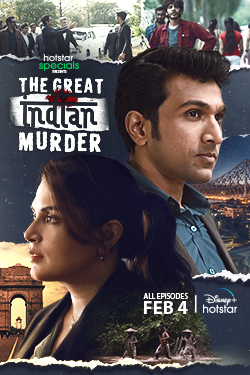
- Season 1 promotional poster
- Genre: Crime; Mystery; Drama
- Based on: Six Suspects by Vikas Swarup
- Screenplay by: Tigmanshu Dhulia; Vijay Maurya; Puneet Sharma
- Directed by: Tigmanshu Dhulia
- Starring: Richa Chadha; Pratik Gandhi; Ashutosh Rana; Raghuvir Yadav; Sharib Hashmi; Paoli Dam; Shashank Arora
- Composer: Ketan Sodha
- Country of origin: India
- Original language: Hindi
- No. of seasons: 1
- No. of episodes: 9

Production
- Executive producers: Priti Sinha; Namrata Sinha; Amod Sinha; Shrey Oberoi; Gaurav Banerjee; Nikhil Madhok; Varun Malik
- Producers: Ajay Devgn; Priti Sinha
- Production location: India
- Cinematography: Rishi Punjabi
- Editors: Prathamesh Chande; Unnikrishnan Payoor Parameswaran
- Camera setup: Single-camera
- Running time: 45 minutes
- Production companies: ADF & RLE Media

Original release
- Network: Disney+ Hotstar
- Release: 4 February 2022

The Great Indian Murder is a Hindi-language crime mystery drama television series directed by Tigmanshu Dhulia for Disney+ Hotstar. It was produced by Ajay Devgn and Priti Sinha under, ADF & RLE Media. The series stars are Richa Chadha, Pratik Gandhi, Ashutosh Rana, Raghuvir Yadav, Sharib Hashmi, Paoli Dam, and Shashank Arora in key roles. The series is based on Vikas Swarup's bestselling novel, Six Suspects. The season was made available for streaming on OTT platform Disney+ Hotstar on 4 February 2022. in Hindi, Marathi, Tamil, Telugu, Kannada, Malayalam and Bengali languages.

== Cast ==
- Richa Chadha as DCP Sudha Bharadwaj
- Pratik Gandhi as CBI officer Suraj Yadav
- Ashutosh Rana as Jagganath Rai, Vicky's father
- Jatin Goswami as Vicky Rai, Jagganath's son
- Raghubir Yadav as Mohan Kumar
- Sharib Hashmi as Ashok Rajput / Amar Rajput
- Sakshi Benipuri as Ishwari
- Paoli Dam as Shabnam Saxena
- Shashank Arora as Munna
- Amey Wagh as Arun Deshmukh
- Ujjwal Gauraha as Celebrity Reporter
- Mani PR as Eketi
- Vineet Kumar as Ambika Prasad
- Kenneth Desai as CM Shashikant Vohra
- Rucha Inamdar as Ritu Rai, Vicky's sister
- Liam Macdonald as Larry Page
- Himanshi Choudhry as Rita Sethi
- Guneet Singh as Manjot
- Deepraj Rana as Prithvi
- Vivek Mishra as Guru Atmadev
- Hemant Mahaur as Billu Biriyani
- Kali Prasad Mukherjee as Debu Da
- Shakti Mohan as Special appearance in song "Raskala"
- Raftaar as Special appearance in song "Raskala"
- [Samarth Chaudhary]

== Review ==
Tigmanshu Dhulia's stories often run with an undercurrent of characters commenting on contemporary politics. "The Great Indian Murder" is woven around a high-profile murder based on Vikas Swarup's breakthrough novel "Six Suspects." The presence of several political events can be felt in "The Great Indian Murder." It is a complex story with many social undertones. Examples include allegations of espionage of politicians, misuse of CBI for political gain and loss, crooked sons of politicians intoxicated by power, politicians conspiring to any extent to fulfill their political ambitions, fake religious leaders, Naxalism, etc. The story is pieced together through a CBI investigation into the murder of Vicky Rai. A series steeped in suspense, it has been praised by most critics. Every character is written well, which keeps the audience engaged with the story. Tigmanshu Dhulia's direction and the actors' performances have received critical praise.

== Marketing and release ==
=== Promotion ===
The official trailer of seasons of this series was launched on 18 January 2022.

=== Release ===
The season was made available for streaming on OTT platform Disney+ Hotstar on 4 February 2022.

== Episodes ==
=== Series overview ===
Season	Episodes	Originally released	
Season	Episodes	First released	Last released
1	9	February 4, 2022	February 4, 2022

=== Season (2022) ===
No.	Title	Directed by	Written by	Original release date
1	"Vicky Rai"	Tigmanshu Dhulia	Tigmanshu Dhulia; Vijay Maurya; Puneet Sharma	4 February 2022
Three years after his arrest, Vikram ‘Vicky’ Rai decides to host a party to celebrate his acquittal. The celebration takes a turn when Vicky is shot dead at his party, in a place full of suspects.
2	"Jagnnath Rai"	Tigmanshu Dhulia	Tigmanshu Dhulia; Vijay Maurya; Puneet Sharma	4 February 2022
An angry Jagannath Rai conspires to take revenge. When Vicky is killed at the party, two gun-wielding suspects are arrested.
3	"Munna aur Ekati"	Tigmanshu Dhulia	Tigmanshu Dhulia; Vijay Maurya; Puneet Sharma	4 February 2022
CBI Officer Suraj Yadav meets Crime Branch officer Sudha Bharadwaj as they unfold the mystery of Vicky’s death, each armed with their own motives.
4	"Ingetayi aur Kaala Bag"	Tigmanshu Dhulia	Tigmanshu Dhulia; Vijay Maurya; Puneet Sharma	4 February 2022
In the Andamans, a tribe is desolate since their God, the Ingetayi’s idol, has been stolen. Under custody, Munna recounts how he narrowly escaped getting caught.
5	"Laal Salaam aur Billu Biryani"	Tigmanshu Dhulia	Tigmanshu Dhulia; Vijay Maurya; Puneet Sharma	4 February 2022
Vicky and Sudha’s history goes back three years. Suraj senses that Eketi is just the right man for his plan. A big lead materialises when officer Manjot and Sudha uncover an image from the party.
6	"Mohan Kumar"	Tigmanshu Dhulia	Tigmanshu Dhulia; Vijay Maurya; Puneet Sharma	4 February 2022
Mohan Kumar, an ex-bureaucrat, suffers an accident that alters his life. A revolver seized from the crime scene is linked to a suspect. Suraj visits Rita’s house for interrogation but she manipulates him and seduces him leading to a physical relationship between both.
7	"Rajneeti aur Pyaar"	Tigmanshu Dhulia	Tigmanshu Dhulia; Vijay Maurya; Puneet Sharma	4 February 2022
Suraj actions an elaborate plan that puts many lives in danger. Sudha questions Suraj’s intentions when he tries to discredit their suspects.
8	"Asli Naqli"	Tigmanshu Dhulia	Tigmanshu Dhulia; Vijay Maurya; Puneet Sharma	4 February 2022
To her surprise, Sudha finds out that Munna was just a ploy in Ritu Rai’s plan. A vulnerable Munna gets brainwashed by Suraj.
9	"Dhokha"	Tigmanshu Dhulia	Tigmanshu Dhulia; Vijay Maurya; Puneet Sharma	4 February 2022
Manjot travels to Jaisalmer and finds an old connection with Vicky. Munna records a statement that puts Eketi in jeopardy. Money, deceit, power... this game has just begun.

== Soundtrack ==
The soundtrack's music composers are Raghu Dixit, Darshan Doshi, Umang Doshi and Ketan Sodha.

Track listing
No.	Title	Lyrics	Music	Singer(s)	Length
1.	"The Great Indian Murder Song"	Puneet Sharma	Raghu Dixit	Varijashree Venugopal	2:21
2.	"Jaane Re Mann"	Rajib Chakraborty	Raghu Dixit	Raju Das Baul	3:45
3.	"Raskala"	Ashwath Bobo	Darshan Doshi, Umang Doshi	Umang Doshi, Anusha Mani	1:27
4.	"Mon Amour"		Ketan Sodha	Nikita Venkatesh	3:18
5.	"Soul of The Great Indian Murder"		Ketan Sodha		1:40
6.	"Bhagad Bille"	Jaspreet Jasz & Shrey Oberoi	Ketan Sodha	Jaspreet Jasz	3:36
Total length:					17:77
