= Rachel Bright =

English actress

- Born: High Wycombe, Buckinghamshire, England
- Education: Birmingham School of Acting
- Occupation: Actress
- Television: EastEnders (2011–2014)
- Spouse: Jonno Davies (m. 2021)
- Children: 1

Rachel Bright is an English actress, known for playing Poppy Meadow in the BBC soap opera EastEnders.

== Career ==
Bright was introduced as Poppy Meadow on the BBC soap opera EastEnders in two episodes on 11 and 13 January 2011, in scenes which were substituted for scenes cut from the controversial baby swap storyline, in which Ronnie Branning's (Samantha Womack) son, James, dies of sudden infant death syndrome and she secretly swaps him with Kat Moon's (Jessie Wallace) son, Tommy. A spokeswoman for EastEnders confirmed that the scenes had been edited following viewers' strong response to the story, but said that no complete scenes were removed: "Given the audience response to this storyline, we felt on this occasion that it was appropriate to respond and make some changes. The vast majority of material remains intact and we don't believe that those trims we have made will weaken or detract from the overall storyline for viewers."

In an interview with the Daily Mirror, Bright stated that her first scene was her favourite throughout her tenure, as "all [she] could think was, 'I'm sitting on a bench in the Square!'". Kylie Babbington, who played Jodie Gold, revealed in May 2011 that Poppy would be returning and would have comical scenes. Bright made her return on 30 June 2011. Poppy and Jodie were reportedly used to add humour to the soap, in the style of reality-drama series The Only Way is Essex. On 24 October 2011, it was announced that the pair were to leave the show; they made their final appearance on 14 November 2011. According to an EastEnders spokesperson, there is potential for Poppy to appear again in the future. In an interview with Inside Soap, EastEnders executive producer Bryan Kirkwood said of a possible return, "We may see Poppy pop up as I'm a big fan of Rachel Bright and the character, but Kylie is keen to pursue other roles." Bright rejoined the cast of EastEnders, appearing on-screen from 12 June 2012 until she left the soap again on 30 January 2014.

Bright appears as Anna in the 2012 UK feature film Life Just Is. From 2016 to 2017, Bright filmed the lead role of Jessica Slade in the British feature film King of Crime, alongside real-life partner Jonno Davies. The film was released in October 2018.

In 2021, Bright and Davies appeared together in an episode of Holby City playing Beth Miller and Leo Powell respectively.

Having had their wedding postponed three times due to coronavirus restrictions, Bright and Davies married at the fourth attempt at The Groucho Club in London on 10 July 2021.

== Filmography ==
Year	Title	Role	Notes
2008	American Dream	Molly	Short film
2008	Sell Out	Girl	Short film
2008	Paintbrush	Marisa	Short film
2008	Canbury	Rachael	Short film
2010	Sometimes the Moon Is Velvet	Hettie	Short film
2010	Red Balloon	Julie	Film
2010	Silly Billy	Kelly	Short film
2010	Scrabble	Rachel	Short film
2011	No Escape		Short film
2011–2014	EastEnders	Poppy Meadow	Regular role
2012	Eradicate	Daughter	Short film
2012	Life Just Is	Anna	Film
2012	Doctors	Tara Pendall	Episode: "Children of the Night"
2013	Don't Move	Anna	Short film
2015	Morning After	Katie	Short film
2015	Doctors	Lisa Cartwright	Episode: "Blind Spot"
2017	Tiebreaker	Sara	Short film
2018	Urban Myths	Christine Whitehead	Episode: "The Sex Pistols Vs. Bill Grundy"
2018	King of Crime	Jessica Slade	Film
2018	Frontline to Russia	Kerry	Miniseries
2020	Bone Breaker	Emily	Film
2020	The Beast Will Rise		Monologue Webseries
2021	Holby City	Beth Miller	Guest role

== Stage ==
- Polly in Electronica (Red Hedgehog, 2008)
- The Girl in Bus Stop Kisser (Camden Peoples Theatre, 2014)
- Lucy in Dracula (Edinburgh Fringe Festival, 2014)
- Julia Simmons in A Murder Is Announced (Nationwide Tour, 2015–2016)
