= Jonno Davies =

English actor (born 1992)

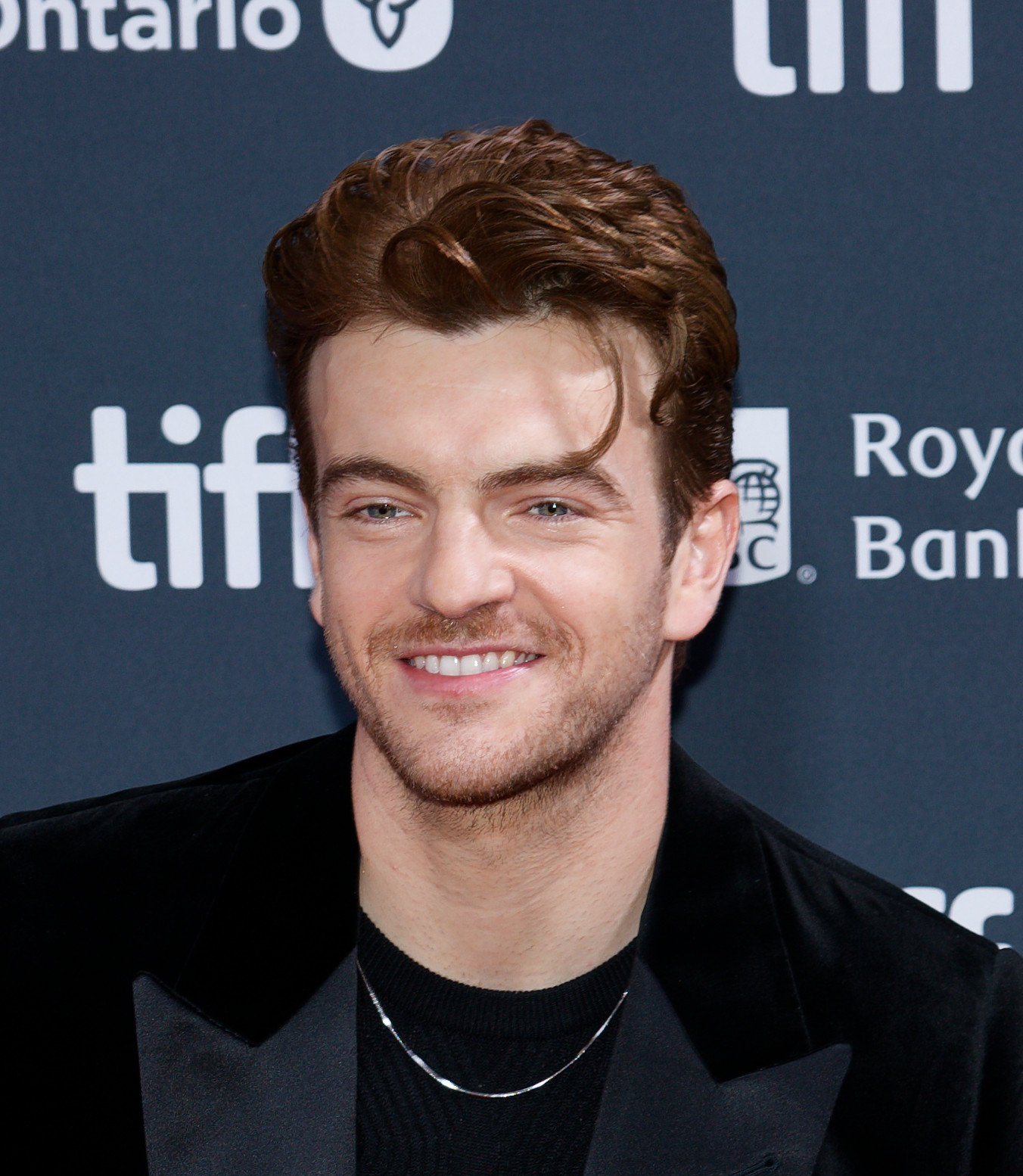
- Davies at the 2024 Toronto International Film Festival
- Born: 17 July 1992 (age 34); Chesterfield, Derbyshire, England
- Education: Italia Conti Academy of Theatre Arts
- Occupation: Actor
- Years active: 2013–present
- Television: Hollyoaks; Hunters
- Spouse: Rachel Bright (m. 2021)
- Children: 1

Jonathan "Jonno" Davies (born 17 July 1992) is an English actor. He is best known in the UK and US for his role as Alex DeLarge in the stage production of A Clockwork Orange. In 2020, he appeared in the Amazon Prime series Hunters as Tobias. He portrayed British singer Robbie Williams in the 2024 biopic Better Man, which earned him the AACTA Award for Best Actor in a Leading Role.

== Education ==
Davies attended Bedford School from 2001 to 2010. He then trained at the Italia Conti Academy of Theatre Arts, graduating in 2013. He was Italia Conti's nominee at the Spotlight Prize competition in his final year.

== Career ==
Davies portrayed the lead role of Alex DeLarge in Action to the Word's all-male stage adaptation of A Clockwork Orange. He was initially cast only for the show's tours of Norway and Singapore, in 2014 and 2015 respectively.

The announcement that A Clockwork Orange was to be staged in Singapore generated media interest, as all theatre productions of Anthony Burgess' dystopian novel had been banned in the city-state for over 30 years.

Davies revived the role during the show's run at Park Theatre, London in February and March 2017 to enthusiastic reviews. Debbie Gilpin of Broadway World described his portrayal as "without doubt this is one of the standout lead performances of the year so far" and Jane Kemp of WhatsOnStage.com commented "Alex is played with brutal splendour by Jonno Davies". The show transferred to the New World Stages theatre, off Broadway, New York in September 2017 with Davies, making his US stage debut, leading a new, all-American supporting cast.

Whilst in New York, Davies modelled for several fashion designers and clothing manufacturers, including Loris Diran, Florsheim, Scarci and Cego.

In addition to performing in A Clockwork Orange, Davies played the title role in Dracula at the Edinburgh Festival Fringe in 2014 and was also a cast member of the Olivier Award-nominated production of Shakespeare in Love at the Noël Coward Theatre in London's West End in 2015.

In June 2019, it was announced that Jonno Davies had been added to the cast of the then-forthcoming Amazon Prime series The Hunt (subsequently renamed Hunters), starring Al Pacino. Davies played the character Tobias in the series.

Davies has appeared in several TV series and films, including Kingsman: The Secret Service as Lee Unwin, Casualty, Spotless, Silent Witness, Hollyoaks and Doctors. He plays the role of Andrew King in the British cyber-crime thriller King of Crime.

In late 2020 Davies provided the voiceover for Aunt Bessie's 'Caring Is The Hardest Thing We Do' TV advertising campaign.

As guest lead in the first episode of series five of BBC1's TV series Shakespeare and Hathaway, Davies played tech-entrepreneur Bertie Talk in 2022.

Jonno played Robbie Williams in the 2024 musical biopic Better Man, providing his voice, body, and motion capture for the CGI face. For his performance, he won the AACTA Award for Best Actor in a Leading Role. Between 2023 and 2024, Davies filmed Tower Stories, in which he portrays Jamie; the film is yet to be released.

== Personal life ==
Davies has been in a relationship with actress Rachel Bright, best known for playing the character Poppy Meadow in EastEnders, since 2014. Following three postponements due to the COVID-19 pandemic, the couple finally married at the fourth attempt at the Groucho Club in London on 10 July 2021. In June 2021, Davies and Bright both appeared together in an episode of Holby City playing Leo Powell and Beth Miller respectively. They have one child together.

== Filmography ==
=== Film ===
Year	Title	Role	Notes
2014	Kingsman: The Secret Service	Lee Unwin	
2014	Samuell Benta's Perceptions	Lewis	Short film
2016	Ben-Hur	Adrian	
2018	King of Crime	Andrew King	
2022	Notes	Stefan	
2024	Better Man	Robbie Williams	Lead
2026	Mother's Pride	Cal	
2026	Young Washington	James Mackay	
TBA	Tower Stories	Jamie	Currently in post-production

=== Television ===
Year	Title	Role	Notes
2013–2014	Casualty	Adam Trenton	2 episodes
2014	Doctors	Nathan Inglis	Episode: "Dorian Blue"
2014–2015	Hollyoaks	Connor	4 episodes
2015	Spotless	Laurie	Episode: "True Love Weighs"
2019	Silent Witness	PC Danny Tresca	Episode: "Lift Up Your Hearts: Part 2"
2020	Hunters	Tobias	8 episodes
2021	Holby City	Leo Powell	Series 23 episode 13
2022	Shakespeare & Hathaway: Private Investigators	Bertie Tark	Episode: "If It Be Man's Work"
2025	The Sandman	Theo	Episode: "Death: The High Cost of Living"
TBA	Gandhi	Henry Polak	Currently in post-production

=== Video games ===
Year	Title	Role	Notes
2022	Horizon Forbidden West	Additional voices	Voice only
2022	The DioField Chronicle	Fredret Lester	Voice only
2025	Battlefield 6	Steven Winters	Voice only
2026	Resonance: A Plague Tale Legacy	Herald / Carmine / Various	Voice only
