= Pasadena High School =

Pasadena High School may refer to:

- Pasadena High School (California)
- Pasadena High School (Pasadena, Texas)
- Pasadena High School, South Australia, in Pasadena, South Australia
