= Poppy Meadow =

Fictional character from EastEnders

- EastEnders character
- Portrayed by: Rachel Bright
- Duration: 2011–2014
- First appearance: Episode 4142; 11 January 2011
- Last appearance: Episode 4795; 30 January 2014
- Introduced by: Bryan Kirkwood
- Spin-off appearances: "All I Want for Christmas" (2012)
In-universe information
- Occupation: Beautician; Barmaid
- Sisters: Tansy Meadow

Poppy Meadow is a fictional character from the BBC soap opera EastEnders, played by Rachel Bright. She was introduced by executive producer Bryan Kirkwood on 11 January 2011 as the best friend of established character Jodie Gold (Kylie Babbington) in scenes filling in for those cut from a controversial baby-swap storyline. Poppy returned to the series in June 2011 as a supporting character and comedy element, in a move that was generally welcomed by the tabloid press; her storylines focused on her friendship with Jodie and their intertwined love lives. Both Jodie and Poppy left the series on 14 November 2011, but the possibility was left open for Poppy to return in the future. In June 2012 Bright reprised her role as Poppy, moving into Walford and resuming her employment at the local beauty salon, this time as a regular character. Poppy's storylines became more prominent, including a romantic relationship with Fatboy (Ricky Norwood). The character was axed in September 2013 by new executive producer Dominic Treadwell-Collins, and Poppy departed on 30 January 2014.

Poppy was introduced into the series in what critics described as "bizarre and utterly irrelevant" and "pointless" scenes, which substituted for cut scenes of the dead baby's parents at the graveside. The Guardian critic Stuart Heritage considered Poppy to be "perhaps the greatest television bit-part character of the modern age" and several Daily Mirror writers gave Poppy positive reviews upon both of her returns.

== Development ==
=== 2011 introduction, return and departure ===
Poppy initially appeared as a guest character in two episodes, broadcast on 11 and 13 January 2011, in "filler" scenes that were substituted for those cut from a controversial baby-swap storyline in which Ronnie Branning's (Samantha Womack) son James dies of sudden infant death syndrome, and she secretly swaps him with Kat Moon's (Jessie Wallace) son, Tommy. A spokeswoman for EastEnders claimed that although some of the baby-swap scenes had been edited in response to reaction from viewers, none had been removed: "Given the audience response to this storyline, we felt on this occasion that it was appropriate to respond and make some changes. The vast majority of material remains intact and we don't believe that those trims we have made will weaken or detract from the overall storyline for viewers". In an interview with the Daily Mirror, Bright stated that her first scene was her favourite throughout her tenure, as "all [she] could think was, 'I'm sitting on a bench in the Square!'" Babbington, who played Jodie, revealed in May 2011 that Bright was to reprise her role. Bright made her return on 30 June 2011.

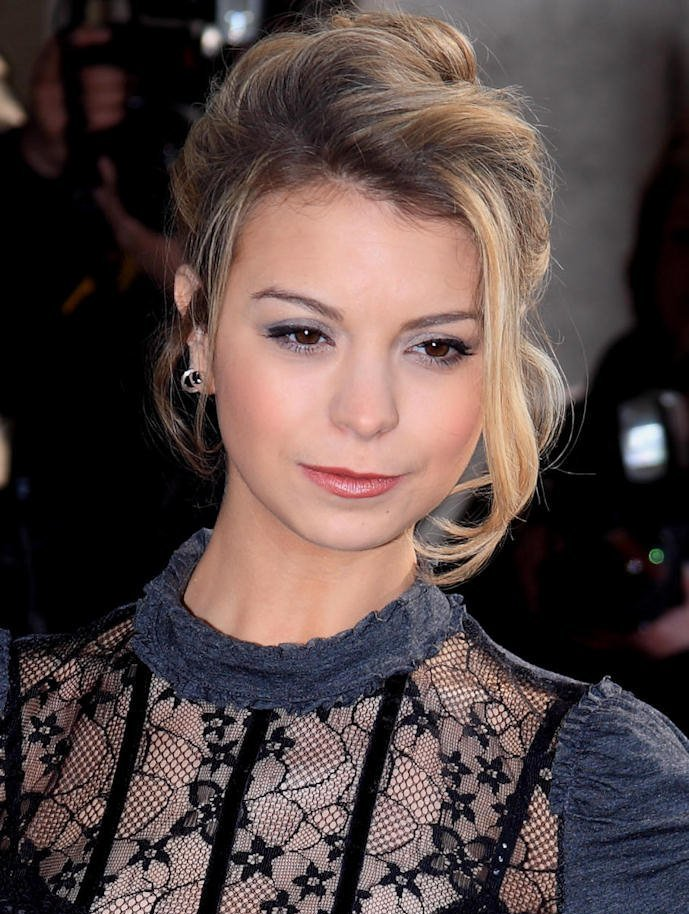
Bright first appeared in January 2011, as one part of the "ditzy duo", the other being established character Jodie Gold (Kylie Babbington, pictured). They departed in November 2011, with the potential for Poppy to return and ultimately did, in June 2012.

On 19 September 2011 episode, Poppy discovers that Jodie's fiancé Darren (Hawkins) has cheated on her. Hawkins assessed the situation Poppy was in: "as everyone knows, Poppy's loyalties lie with Jodie – they're super best friends! Poppy wants Darren to own up straight away, because she feels that if he doesn't, she'll be lying to Jodie as well". He explained, "Poppy doesn't want to see Jodie in pain, but she can't keep the secret". Poppy and Jodie were reportedly used to add humour to the soap, in the style of reality-drama series The Only Way Is Essex. On 24 October 2011 it was announced that the pair were to leave the show. Her departure storyline saw her to start to date Anthony (Lapinskas), who considered his character to be "pleased that somebody likes him". He added that while his character was also interested in Jodie, he did what he thought was expected of him in asking Poppy out. After he and Jodie kissed, Lapinskas revealed that Jodie would be angry with herself for betraying Poppy. An Inside Soap writer predicted that Anthony was heading for trouble, and that he was "playing with fire" by kissing both Poppy and Jodie. A source told RTÉ, "[Jodie] and Poppy have never let a man come between them. Poppy may have something to say to Jodie when she finds out they have kissed". The Digital Spy's Daniel Kilkelly and the Daily Star's Susan Hill confirmed that Poppy would forgive Jodie, and they made their final appearance on 14 November 2011. According to an EastEnders spokesperson, there was potential for Poppy to return in the future; in an interview with Inside Soap, EastEnders executive producer Bryan Kirkwood said: "We may see Poppy pop up as I'm a big fan of Rachel Bright and the character, but Kylie is keen to pursue other roles".

=== 2012 return and 2014 departure ===
On 18 May 2012 Daniel Kilkelly of Digital Spy confirmed that Bright would be reprising her role and returning to EastEnders. On her return, Bright said that it was "really exciting to be asked back", saying that it was "nice to just slot back in", adding, "I feel really lucky". Talking to Inside Soap's Allison Jones and Laura-Jayne Tyler, Bright said of her return, "The door was always left open for Poppy, but it was a big surprise to be asked back so quickly. I thought it might be further down the track, so when my agent rang, I was like, 'Yes—no problem!'". Bright stated that "fear crept over" when she was filming her first scene since her departure, as it was without Babbington. She added that she felt "safe working with Kylie", but felt that without her the audience might get to know Poppy better. In Poppy's return storyline on 12 June, she arrived back in Walford to help Tanya (Joyner) with Janine's (Brooks) wedding preparations. A spokesperson for the show claimed that Poppy had become "a successful nail artist" since her departure, but as Poppy's storylines progress that is revealed to be untrue; Poppy was trying to impress Tanya. Bright said in an Inside Soap interview of Poppy's storylines, "I think her job in Walford is to keep things light, and right now Poppy's in a happy place. She'll carry on dipping in and out of storylines, but viewers can expect to see more of her soon. I'm excited about that!". The magazine added that Poppy had made a "welcome return". Poppy begins a new friendship with Alice (Banks), who was stated to be a replacement for Jodie. Bright said of this new friendship, "They are polar opposites, but that works. I think Poppy almost mothers Alice by looking after her and giving her good advice. Or at least it's what Poppy thinks is good advice!".

Many viewers and fans of EastEnders expected Poppy's return to be only temporary, and thought that she would depart soon after her return. However, it was announced on 24 October that Kirkwood's successor Lorraine Newman decided that Bright will remain with EastEnders for the foreseeable future as a regular character. Upon this news, Digital Spy announced that Wood-Davis had been cast as Tansy Meadow, Poppy's younger sister, who appeared for one episode. Poppy is "less than enthusiastic" to hear about her sister's visit. On 30 October 2012 episode, Poppy, along with Fatboy (Norwood) host a Halloween ghost tour of the Square organised showing people where former residents have died. Newman stated in an interview in November 2012 that there is "plenty more on the table" for Poppy adding, "We'll see Poppy become involved in a relationship very soon, which is progressing very well in the material we're working on at the moment. She'll become far more involved in the Square and the friendships within those groups". Digital Spy also revealed Poppy's new relationship, adding that "viewers will have to wait and see who she falls for and how things pan out as the new plot develops". This was confirmed as Fatboy, and the two kiss in 22 November's episode. The pair "grow close" after Tansy's visit, where Fatboy acts as Poppy's "high-flying" businessman boyfriend in front of Tansy, trying to make herself look good in front of her "successful sibling". Bright said of their relationship, "It's really sweet. I don't think Poppy or Fatboy realised they liked each other as they've been friends for a while. She's unsure at first because she doesn't want to ruin a friendship. She's also been unlucky in love, so she's a little bit wary. But I think she can trust Fatboy". Bright expressed her delight at working with Norwood upon her return, after being disappointed she did not work with him during her first stint. In an interview with Metro she said, "Before I started the show Fatboy was one of my favourite characters. I was gutted I didn’t work with him the first time round so when I came back and they told me about Poppy and Fatboy’s relationship, I was just so excited. Their characters are perfect for each other. Poppy and Fatboy are a little bit of light in a lot of gloom around the Square. It’s important to have a bit of comedy between everything else. I’m very lucky". She also expressed her wish for the two to get married, adding that their relationship "looks long term".

The couple were at the center of a Red Button spin-off episode, featuring how Poppy and Fatboy spent their Christmas together. The spinoff, entitled "All I Want for Christmas", featured the characters of Alice, Tyler (Discipline) and Tamwar (Patel), with Wood-Davis reprising her role as Tansy, whilst Keith Parry guest starred as "Santa Tramp". Bright said of the spinoff, "Poppy spends the day with Fatboy. She is under pressure to go back to her family, but realises she doesn't want that. Her and Fatboy have a romantic day, but you don't see anything on screen [in the Christmas episode] because it is dominated by the Brannings. There will be an interactive section where viewers can press the red button and see a ten-minute film of how Poppy and Fatboy spent their day". Bright discussed their relationship in an interview with TV Guide, calling them the "jolliest couple in Walford". She said, "It's all very sweet for them both at the moment. I reckon they're going to be one of those couples who you want to shout 'Get a room!' at. They're characters who need to be loved. Poppy certainly hopes she's found her Prince Charming".

On 24 September 2013, it was announced that Poppy, along with three other characters—Kirsty Branning (Kierston Wareing), AJ Ahmed (Phaldut Sharma) and Carl White (Daniel Coonan)—had been axed from the series by the new executive producer Dominic Treadwell-Collins. It was reported that Treadwell-Collins was "determined to get EastEnders back to its best" and subsequently increase ratings. A EastEnders source added that Treadwell-Collins "didn't feel the characters who are leaving fit with the direction he is taking the show", leading to these characters being written out. The source continued; "He has only been in a month but he is already making big changes. He knows what he wants for EastEnders and is putting plans in place quickly". An EastEnders spokesperson confirmed this saying, "We can confirm these actors will be leaving EastEnders. We wish them all the best". Bright filmed her final scenes before Christmas 2013 and Poppy departed in the last week of January 2014, after her relationship with Fatboy ended.

=== Characterisation ===
Everything's just so 'lovely' in Poppy's little world where nothing bad happens and if it does she'll find a way to flip it around. Nothing is more important than friends and family to her, they're the centre of her world.

— The BBC on Poppy

Poppy, Jodie's best friend, is a beautician. The EastEnders website describes Poppy as "a little bit 'uncomplicated'", but "no push over" and that she "brings out the best in everyone". Several critics have described Poppy as "ditzy". Sarah Dempster of The Guardian deemed her "dumb", and RTÉ's Sarah Hardy called her "insanely grating". In a press release announcing Poppy and Jodie's departure, they were described as "giggly girls"; Digital Spy's Daniel Kilkelly, the Daily Star and The List have similarly referred to them as a "ditzy duo". Bright stated in an interview that in real life she is "nothing like Poppy" but did later add, when asked if she would be a good beautician in real life, "I'm quite a perfectionist and I think Poppy is too".

Commenting on Poppy's 2012 return the BBC added, "The lure of Walford was too great and she's back to spread sunshine in Albert Square again". Bright called her "fabulous", "cool" and "dappy" (Note: Modern British slang for a person who is "silly, clumsy, eccentric", a merging of the words "dippy" and "daffy".) compared to her in real life. Writers of Inside Soap called her "bubbly" and "perky", calling her an "aspiring beautician". In 2012, Bright said that the public ask her why she is talking differently from Poppy, adding that she is "definitely one of a kind, so fans tend to be quite shocked when they realise I'm completely different from her". Bright said she both loves and hates Poppy's dress sense, as she has some items of clothing that are "really cute" but "the way she puts things together is slightly crazy! It's eccentric, but that suits Poppy".

== Storylines ==
Poppy arrives in Walford as the best friend of Jodie Gold (Kylie Babbington), chatting in The Queen Victoria public house about their daily lives and current affairs. Jodie tries to arrange a date for Poppy with Tamwar Masood (Himesh Patel), until Tamwar's mother, Zainab (Nina Wadia), interferes with her plans. Poppy returns to Walford some months later, now dating Jodie's ex-boyfriend Julian. When Poppy loses her job, Jodie suggests she work at the Walford beauty salon as a receptionist. Tyler Moon (Tony Discipline) flirts with Poppy, who initially rejects his advances, but after she reveals that her relationship with Julian is problematic she decides to date Tyler, to make Julian jealous. Off-screen she ends her relationship with Julian. Jodie and her boyfriend Darren Miller (Charlie G. Hawkins) become engaged; she asks Poppy, Lauren Branning (Jacqueline Jossa) and Lauren's sister Abi (Lorna Fitzgerald) to be her bridesmaids. Darren is anxious that if Jodie finds out he had a "drunken encounter" with Lauren at his stag party she may cancel the wedding, but Poppy discovers his secret and threatens to tell Jodie if they do not. Jodie subsequently admits that she already knows and still wants to get married, but Darren calls off the wedding and leaves Walford. Poppy moves out of her mother's home and into a flat with Jodie, which they rent from Ian Beale (Adam Woodyatt). After he increases their rent they refuse to pay, which leads to their eviction, and the girls move in with Tyler and his brother, Anthony (Matt Lapinskas); it soon becomes clear that Poppy is attracted to Anthony. He asks her out on a date, despite admitting to his brother that he has stronger feelings for Jodie, whom he later kisses. Remorseful, Jodie decides to leave London. She admits the kiss to Poppy, who is furious and refuses to speak to her. Tyler tricks the two girls into meeting up, and they are able to repair their friendship. Poppy also decides to leave London and goes to live with her mother in Essex, while Jodie goes to find Darren.

Poppy returns months later to help Tanya Cross (Jo Joyner), who is hired by Janine Butcher (Charlie Brooks) to do her hair and make up for her wedding to Michael Moon (Steve John Shepherd). Poppy tells Janine and Tanya about her "plush" new lifestyle, but when she arrives home her living arrangements are far from glamorous, and there is an eviction notice on her front door. Poppy is subsequently evicted from her bedsit, but Fatboy (Ricky Norwood) offers her a place to stay, and Tanya offers Poppy a permanent job at the salon. Poppy then moves into Dot Branning's (June Brown) house after being offered a room by Cora Cross (Ann Mitchell). Poppy forgives Anthony, and begins a new friendship with Alice Branning (Jasmyn Banks). She starts a relationship with Fatboy, after her sister Tansy Meadow's (Daisy Wood-Davis) visit, where Fatboy acts as Poppy's "high-flying" businessman boyfriend in front of Tansy, in an effort to make herself look good in front of her younger "successful" sister. Although it is revealed that Tansy is not that successful, she tells Poppy that Fatboy loves her. The two start a relationship and later declare their love for each other. After a few months, Poppy sees text messages on Fatboy's phone from a girl called Chloe (Siobhan Athwal), and suspects he is cheating on her, and is further upset when she sees them together. However, Fatboy reveals that Chloe is his colleague and he has started working at McKlunkies again. Poppy is then made redundant when owner Sadie Young (Kate Magowan) decides to leave Walford after discovering that her husband Jake Stone (Jamie Lomas) has been having an affair with Lauren, which causes Poppy to act cold towards Lauren.

Poppy interferes in Dot's relationship with her son, Nick Cotton (John Altman), telling him that his mother does not want to speak to him. She then allows Fatboy to stay with her after Tamwar throws him out. Poppy is then devastated to learn that Fatboy shared a passionate kiss with Denise Fox (Diane Parish), after hearing the pair whispering about it. She then learns that Fatboy and Denise had slept together before he was even in a relationship with Poppy. This infuriates Poppy, who storms over to the Minute Mart and confronts Denise, leading to the two women clashing in the shop. Poppy then returns home and tells Fatboy that she has forgiven him, but she needs to move away from Walford so that they can have a fresh start. Fatboy refuses to move and says he wants to end their relationship. She packs her bags and leaves Walford for Hemel Hempstead, but not before posting a letter through Ian's letterbox, detailing about his fiancée's infidelity.

== Reception ==
Poppy's introduction to EastEnders was criticised by Daniella Graham of the Metro, who said that "viewers were left questioning why on earth anyone thought this pointless sub-plot was necessary". In contrast, The Press and Journal's Derek Lord deemed Poppy to have been "a welcome addition to the show"; he wrote that, "as a double act, [Jodie and Poppy are] no Morecambe and Wise, but at least they bring an element of something approaching humour to the otherwise soul-destroying drabness of the London soap". Jim Shelley of the Daily Mirror labelled Poppy the "Optimist of the week" for her line "I bet it's really nice here when they ain't having a funeral", and "Delicate flower of the week" for her "That is so well tragic innit?" when commenting on Tommy Moon's death. Stuart Heritage from guardian.co.uk said that Poppy made an impact in her two episodes, branding her as "perhaps the greatest television bit-part character of the modern age". Heritage added that she had "the name of a Bond girl, the hair of a Winkleman and the voice of a Katie Price robot running low on batteries"; describing her as "electrifying", he hoped that she would return. Katy Moon from Inside Soap discussed Poppy's original two episode stint:

What I've always loved about soaps is that element of surprise ... and last week I was genuinely taken aback by Jodie and her best mate Poppy in EastEnders ... There's been so much darkness in the show what it really needed was some light relief. The dialogue was excellently written – very The Only Way Is Essex – and made me laugh out loud. Before last week, I could take or leave Jodie Gold. But Poppy changed all that. Having watched the girls bounce off each other I have a much better idea of what Jodie is about. Now, I'm hoping that we get to find out more about Poppy. Perhaps she's got an interesting family who could relocate from Shepherd's Bush and brighten up the Square?

"I'm completely overwhelmed with all this Poppy love. Thank you. #Chuffed x".

— Bright's tweet on her official Twitter account after the news that Poppy was to become a regular character was confirmed by Digital Spy (2012).

Upon Poppy's return in 2011, she and Jodie were widely known as a "double act". Roz Laws of the Sunday Mercury welcomed Poppy's return, observing that "Walford needs all the humour it can get these days". In the Daily Mirror, Jennifer Rodger called them a "refreshing change", and Tony Stewart deemed them "The daftest girls in Soapland and probably the funniest". Stewart was one of several critics to express displeasure over their axing, describing it as "a shame". Jane Simon and Brian McIver of the Daily Record described them as "an adorable female double act [and] E20's answer to 2 Shoes", and wrote of their departure, "apparently there just isn't enough room for sunny, funny, glass-half-full types in Walford". A critic writing for The Huffington Post suggested that they had "injected some humour into the famously gloomy soap". The Daily Mirror's Rodger said that she was "sad" that the duo had left, saying that she "found their scenes together hilarious", hoping that she would see both Bright and Babbington in a new show together. Bright stated that during her main stint in 2011, she received mail telling her saying how much fans liked the double act between Poppy and Jodie, and that they were a "breath of fresh air".

Upon Bright's return in 2012, she was still named "one half of Poppy and Jodie double-act", with the Daily Mirror's Simon adding that Poppy was returning "just in time because some people in Walford are in dire need of a make-under". Inside Soap predicted that Albert Square would be a "cheerier place for the foreseeable future as bubbly Poppy Meadow makes a welcome return". Radio Times made a similar comment about Poppy's return saying that, "In happier news, the glorious Poppy Meadow is back. That is sooo lovely!". Although Stewart did not particularly aim this at Poppy, Stewart did complain about the younger characters in the cast, using Poppy as one of the examples. He said, "While there are some talented and award-winning young actors in the cast, you can't help but suspect that colouring books and crayons are handed out with the scripts at times". A Daily Mirror writer said that Poppy, played by the "excellent Rachel Bright", is "one of the comedy delights in this soap". The writer stated that she was "even more Essex than former Towie star Amy Childs".
