= American Burger =

2014 Swedish, horror-comedy film

- Theatrical release poster
- Directed by: Johan Bromander; Bonita Drake
- Written by: Johan Bromander; Bonita Drake
- Produced by: Anna G Magnusdottir; Anders Granström
- Starring: Fredrik Hiller; Liam Macdonald; Benjamin Brook; Madeleiene Borg; Ben Thornton; Aggy K. Adams; Charlie Petersson
- Cinematography: Ævar Páll Sigurðson
- Edited by: Fredrik Alneng
- Music by: Christian Engquist; Marcus Frenell; Olle Hellström; Fredrik Söderström
- Production company: LittleBig Productions
- Distributed by: Movieboosters
- Release date: October 2014 (Sitges)
- Running time: 78 minutes
- Country: Sweden
- Language: English
- Budget: 11,000,000 kr

American Burger is a 2014 Swedish comedy horror film starring Fredrik Hiller, Liam Macdonald, Benjamin Brook, Aggy Kukawka and Ben Thornton. It is directed by first-time feature film director's Johan Bromander & Bonita Drake.

The film was released was released globally online via Movieboosters on 17 October 2014.

== Plot ==
American Burger follows the stories of a bunch of stereotypical American school students (Nerds, Jocks & Cheerleaders) on a culture trip through Europe. Among the students are Fat Nerd (Liam Macdonald) & Preppy Nerd (Benjamin Brook), Camera Nerd (Charlie Petersson) & Wonky Eyes Nerd (Ben Thorton) and Nice Cheerleader (Aggy K. Adams), Adorable Cheerleader (Madeleine Borg) & Ponytail Cheerleader (Hanna Nygren). Heading the group is the enthusiastic Teacher (Lena Bengtsson) who tries her hardest to ensure the children appreciate their trip.

The students soon find their way to the mystical country of Kraketch, whose main source of economy is the American Burger Factory run by Demented Butcher (Fredrik Hiller). The school students are invited to tour the factory, but not before Demented Butcher orders his Butchers to kill the students and bring them into the factory. Several students escape and form unlikely pacts: Fat Nerd, Preppy Nerd, Wonky Eyes Nerd (whose name is later revealed to actually be 'Mike) & Ponytail Cheerleader and Camera Nerd, Jock, Quarterback & Nice Cheerleader for the other. Adorable Cheerleader loses the others and runs off by herself as does Teacher.

Slowly, the Butchers hunt, stalk and kill the students. Preppy Nerd is kidnapped by butchers, thinking he is already dead; Adorable Cheerleader hilariously loses almost all her clothes and now speaks with a lisp after eating poison berries; Fat Nerd steals a dead Butcher's outfit and escapes to the main road leading out of Kraketch and Nice Cheerleader & Camera Nerd run to escape a horde of butchers.

Whilst at the American Burger factory waiting to be slaughtered, it is discovered that Preppy Nerd is actually a Canadian. A disgusted Demented Butcher apologises profusely and allows Preppy Nerd to leave with his blessings. Preppy Nerd then locates the student's bus and drives away from the factory.

On the way out of Kraketch, Preppy Nerd locates some of his classmates. He first picks up Adorable Cheerleader, then Fat Nerd & Teacher before saving Nice Cheerleader from a horde of Butchers. The gang drive away in the school bus and leave Kraketch for good.

== Cast ==
- Fredrik Hiller as Demented Butcher
- Liam Macdonald as Fat Nerd
- Benjamin Brook as Preppy Nerd
- Ben Thornton as Mike, Wonky Eyes Nerd
- Aggy K. Adams as Nice Cheerleader
- Madeleine Borg as Adorable Cheerleader
- Lena Bengtsson as Teacher
- Charlie Petersson as Camera Nerd
- Gabriel Freilich as Quarterback
- Hjalmar Strid as Jock

== Reception ==
American Burger received mixed reviews from critics although its technical aspects were praised. Borg & Macdonald were also praised for their roles as Adorable Cheerleader & Fat Nerd respectively by the Ostersund Posten.

== Proposed sequel ==
A sequel to American Burger, called American Burger 2: Back to Kraketch is currently in development. Hiller, Macdonald, Brook, Kukawka & Borg are all expected to reprise their roles.

== Filming locations ==
All filming took place in Östersund, Sweden.
