= The Accidental Apprentice =

First edition (publ. Simon & Schuster)

The Accidental Apprentice is a novel by Indian author Vikas Swarup. It is about a shop assistant, Sapna Sinha, who is invited to become CEO of a business empire if she can pass a series of seven tests. The story explores various forms of corruption in modern India. It has been dramatised for BBC Radio Four's 15 Minute Drama and is due to be adapted into a film by director Sriram Raghavan.

== Plot ==
The premise of the plot is inspired by the reality television show The Apprentice. Sapna Sinha works in an electronics store in downtown Delhi. She hates her job, but she is ambitious and determined to succeed, because she knows that her family's fate is dependent on the money she brings in. One day, as she leaves the shop for her lunchbreak, she is approached by a man, Vinay Mohan Acharya, who claims to be the CEO of one of India's biggest companies. He tells her he is looking for someone to take on his business empire, and has decided it should be her. But in order to become the heir of his empire, Sapna must pass seven tests from the "Textbook of Life".

The seven tests are seven unexpected and life-threatening situations with each test revealing a different quality of a leader. Sapna passes six of the seven tests with great difficulty. Though Vinay praises her for her character, Sapna is outraged at Vinay's indifference to the threat which posed to life. Each situation explores a facet of corruption in India. So far, Sapna learns the qualities of leadership, integrity, courage, foresight, resourcefulness and decisiveness, with Acharya keeping tabs on her and explaining the relevance of each quality.

As the story progresses, it is revealed that Acharya is facing bitter rivalry from his volatile and aggressive twin brother, AK Acharya. His company is engaging in insider trading and Acharya himself is not keeping well.

Acharya hints that the seventh and final test would be the hardest of all. However, as Sapna proceeds against the final task, the seventh test horribly spirals out of control. Vinay is found murdered mysteriously and Sapna is framed for the murder.

Sapna escapes from jail and she discovers, to her horror, that her past had come to haunt her. Sapna uses all her wits to escape from the escalating situation and finally all is well.

In the end, AK takes over Vinay's company and feels remorseful for holding a grudge against his brother. He speaks to Sapna and gives her a letter written by Vinay long ago. The letter reveals the truth why Vinay had chosen Sapna as his successor and tells her the final lesson he intended to impart: Wisdom. AK explains Sapna his brother's intentions, clearing her doubts.

AK promises help to Sapna and asks her to take over as the CEO of Vinay's company. Sapna turns it down, saying that she intends to follow her heart, and AK agrees with her.
