= Jodie Gold =

Fictional character from EastEnders

- EastEnders character
- Portrayed by: Kylie Babbington
- Duration: 2010–2011
- First appearance: Episode 4014; 7 June 2010
- Last appearance: Episode 4317; 14 November 2011
- Introduced by: Diederick Santer and Bryan Kirkwood
- Spin-off appearances: EastEnders: E20 (2011)
- Crossover appearances: East Street (2010)
In-universe information
- Occupation: Beautician; Barmaid
- Mother: Vanessa Gold
- Adoptive father: Harry Gold

Jodie Gold is a fictional character from the BBC soap opera EastEnders, played by Kylie Babbington. She first appeared on screen on 7 June 2010. On 24 October 2011, it was announced that Babbington's contract would not be renewed and Jodie departed on 14 November 2011, along with Poppy Meadow (Rachel Bright).

Originally introduced as a love interest for Darren Miller (Charlie G. Hawkins), she is also the daughter of established character Vanessa Gold (Zöe Lucker). Jodie is Jewish and out of respect for her faith Darren has a circumcision. He later proposes to Jodie as well, ultimately deciding not to marry her due to his belief that he is unworthy. Vanessa's husband Harry (Linal Haft) was thought to be her father until Vanessa reveals he is not in an argument.

Within six months of her initial appearance, Babbington received many letters from fans that said Jodie was their ideal woman. Daniella Graham from the Metro said that "viewers were left questioning why on earth anyone thought this pointless sub-plot was necessary." This was later confirmed to be "filler" as a number of scenes were cut out from Tommy Moon's funeral.

== Creation and development ==
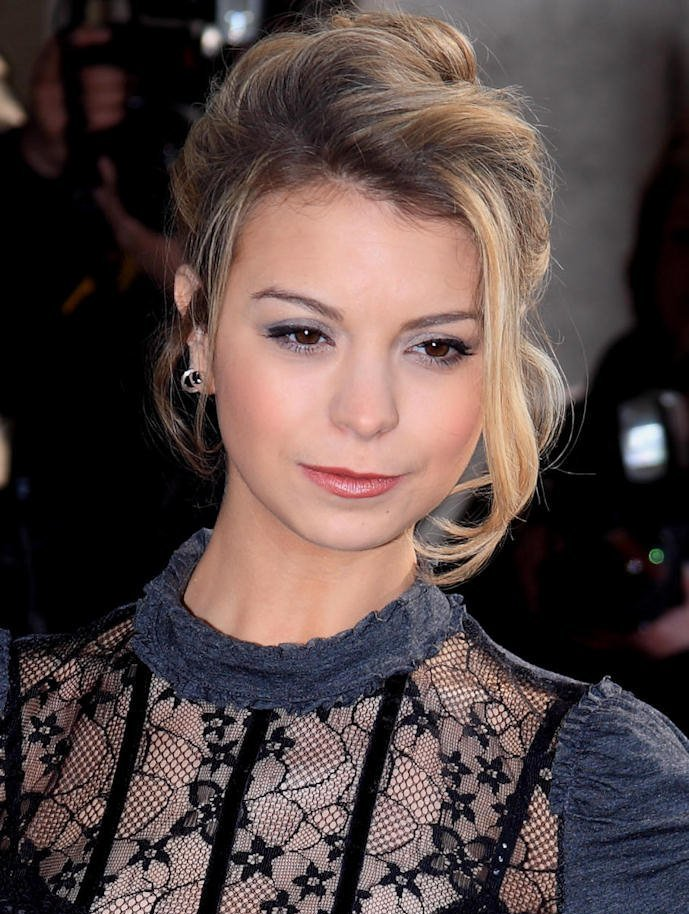
Kylie Babbington (pictured) was cast as a love interest for Darren Miller.

Jodie first appears on screen on 7 June 2010. The character was announced on 10 May 2010 as a love interest for Darren Miller (Charlie G. Hawkins) and daughter to Vanessa Gold (Zöe Lucker). Executive producer Bryan Kirkwood told entertainment website Digital Spy, "I'm really excited about Kylie taking on the role of Jodie. She brings yet more fresh energy to the show—she's a ray of sunshine." The character is 19 years old on her arrival and Jodie is Babbington's first television role. In January 2011, scenes with Jodie, Darren, Tamwar Masood (Himesh Patel) and Jodie's previously unseen friend Poppy were added as "filler" for scenes from the funeral of Tommy Moon that were cut from the episodes. In February 2011, Jodie and Darren's relationship hits a rocky patch when he loses his job, but this prompts him to propose to Jodie. An EastEnders spokesperson said "With all the recent ups and downs the couple have had, Darren fears he has lost Jodie for good. Desperate to win her back, he proposes. Will there be a Walford summer wedding and how will Vanessa feel about her young daughter getting engaged?" Babbington said that viewers would have to tune in to see what happens, but added "It's EastEnders! It's never going to be smooth sailing". She promised the plot would be "exciting" and said that "[Jodie and Darren are] from different walks of life and seeing them together is a nice contrast. I think they make a nice couple, definitely." In March 2011, Babbington told website Holy Soap that she enjoys the storylines she has been given.

On 30 April 2011, it was announced that Jodie's boyfriend Darren and her mother Vanessa were both to leave the show but entertainment website Digital Spy confirmed that Jodie would stay in the show regardless, and Babbington said there would be reasons for Jodie to stay, teasing that she may get a new love interest. On 24 October 2011, Digital Spy reported Babbington would be departing EastEnders in November, after her contract reached its natural conclusion.

=== Characterisation ===
Upon Jodie's announcement, the character was described as big-hearted with "an infectious smile and a personality to match." Her profile on the official EastEnders website describes her as someone who seems "dippy" but knows how to get what she wants, which is shown when she gets a job, a date and a new car all within her first episode. Although Vanessa and Harry mollycoddle her, Jodie is not spoilt, and she is sympathetic and kind, and has an extensive wardrobe and collection of handbags. It also stated that Jodie liked the finer things in life, and has a heart of gold. It continues to read that Jodie may have seemed a "little dippy", but she knew how to get what she wanted. The BBC also said that "life is never dull when Jodie's around!" Daniel Kilkelly from Digital Spy described Jodie as "ditzy".

== Storylines ==
In Jodie's first appearance, she is found by Darren Miller (Charlie G. Hawkins) on the road saying she is lost. Darren offers to help her and she agrees to go on a date. She then finds her mother, Vanessa (Zöe Lucker) who hands her the keys to her new car, and Jodie reveals she got the job she had interviewed for at Roxy Mitchell's (Rita Simons) salon. The next day she goes for lunch with Darren and she thinks it is sweet when Darren reveals he has a son, George Trott. Their relationship gets off to a rocky start, especially when Darren accuses Jodie of stealing his World Cup tickets, but eventually, they agree to have sex. However, when Jodie sees that Darren is not circumcised, she explains that she is Jewish and cannot have sex with a man who is not circumcised, though she does not go to a synagogue. This causes them to break up temporarily but they soon start dating again, saying they can wait to have sex. Darren has his circumcision in secret, telling Jodie he is on holiday. However, when Vanessa's affair with Darren's boss Max Branning (Jake Wood) is revealed and she is dumped by her husband Harry (Linal Haft), Jodie dumps Darren, thinking that he has been laughing at her, and disowns her mother. However, Jodie and Vanessa are reunited after a fire breaks out in The Queen Victoria public house (see Queen Vic Fire Week).

Darren tries to win Jodie back by explaining that he had a circumcision, but she did not listen to him because he did not tell her about Max and Vanessa's affair. However, she finally reads a letter he wrote and they reunite. Vanessa ends her affair with Max so that Jodie and Darren can continue to see each other, and Jodie and Darren have sex for the first time. During a special lunch on Vanessa's birthday, Harry shows little interest in her, and Jodie tells her that she realizes now that they are not happy together and urges her to go back to Max, which she does. When Harry issues Vanessa with divorce papers, saying he can convince Jodie to turn against her, she tells him he is not Jodie's father. Harry sends Jodie to live with Vanessa, and he later tells Darren he is not Jodie's father. Darren begs him not to tell her as it would break her heart but later Jodie says Harry phoned her and Darren assumes he told her, so he inadvertently reveals the truth. Jodie initially disowns her mother but when she tries to find a place of her own, she realizes she needs Vanessa with her. Harry then starts to take revenge, including throwing a brick through the window and killing Jodie's cat. Vanessa tells Jodie she met a young Portuguese fisherman on holiday and he is her father, though she did not know his name.

During a New Year's Eve party, drunken Jodie persuades Darren to tell her he wants to marry her. Darren is unsure at first but goes to propose, but she stops him as she was not serious. However, she is delighted that he would have asked her. In a conversation with her friend Poppy Meadow (Rachel Bright), Jodie says she wishes Harry would stop blaming her for something that was not her fault and she appears as a "mascot" for the relaunch of the car lot, much to Vanessa's annoyance, though no one turns up as Darren did not send the fliers out, so he is fired. Jodie tells him that it will be okay, though he blames her for his sacking so she dumps him. She then goes to the R&R nightclub where she sees Darren kissing another girl; Jodie storms out of the club. However, she overhears him telling Abi Branning (Lorna Fitzgerald) how much he still loves Jodie. Jodie walks in and he tells her he would not change anything about her and proposes; she accepts. Jodie then gets a job at The Queen Vic as a barmaid. Darren gains custody of George, who keeps Jodie awake at night, causing her to be late for work where she is told by Roxy that there is a new manager of the salon, Max's ex-wife Tanya Jessop (Jo Joyner). When Jodie is left alone with George, she struggles and leaves him with Heather Trott (Cheryl Fergison), George's mother. She later forgets, and when Darren calls her, she rushes back to Heather and takes George back without Darren knowing what had happened. Darren later finds out after George has an accident while in Jodie's care, and Jodie and Darren break up as she is not ready to be a stepmother. However, Darren decides George is better off with Heather, and he and Jodie reunite. Darren later goes to visit his family without Jodie. On his return, he starts stealing from work in order to pay for the wedding. He is soon discovered by Jack Branning (Scott Maslen), who informs Jodie and she calls off the wedding until Darren wins her back round. However, he then cheats on her with Jodie's friend Lauren Branning (Jacqueline Jossa). Jodie finds them together and despite this, she decides that she still wants to marry Darren. However, before the wedding, Darren decides he is not good enough for Jodie and leaves Walford. Jodie is further dismayed when her mother, Vanessa leaves Walford, but is supported by Poppy, and the pair become flatmates. They rent a flat from Ian Beale (Adam Woodyatt), but when he increases their rent, they refuse to pay and Ian tells Jodie and Poppy to leave. They then move in with brothers Anthony (Matt Lapinskas) and Tyler Moon (Tony Discipline).

It soon emerges that Poppy is attracted to Anthony, and Jodie tells him. Anthony prefers Jodie, but despite this, he asks Poppy out on a date. His feelings for Jodie grow and they later kiss, which leaves her feeling remorseful. Jodie decides to leave London because of the kiss. However, Poppy believes that Jodie is leaving as she is lonely without Darren, so he sets her up with Tyler. Anthony stops Tyler from asking her out, though Poppy is confused by this and Jodie tells Poppy about the kiss. The next day, Poppy is still furious over the kiss and is not speaking to Jodie. Tyler tricks the two girls to meet up with each other, after Tyler sends a message on Poppy's phone to Jodie, forgiving her. They then fix their friendship. Jodie begins to miss Darren, and after being suggested by Poppy, she decides that she and Darren were meant to be together and goes to find him in Oxford, where Darren is staying with his ex-girlfriend Libby Fox (Belinda Owusu). Poppy and Jodie go separate ways after saying an emotional goodbye, with Jodie finding Darren and Poppy moving back with her mother.

== Other appearances ==
Jodie appears in "East Street", a charity crossover episode between EastEnders and rival soap opera Coronation Street, broadcast on 19 November 2010 as part of the BBC One telethon for the children's charity Children in Need. In the non-canon episode, Jodie is amongst a number of EastEnders characters who visit Coronation Street's setting of Weatherfield, and she has trouble walking on famous cobbles of the Street wearing her high heels.

== Reception ==
According to Babbington, during her first six months on-screen, she had received several letters from male fans saying Jodie is their ideal woman. Daniella Graham from the Metro said; "viewers were left questioning why on earth anyone thought this pointless sub-plot was necessary". Derek Lord from The Press and Journal, however, said it was "a welcome addition to the show" and that "like a double act, [Jodie and Poppy are] no Morecambe and Wise, but at least they bring an element of something approaching humour to the otherwise soul-destroying drabness of the London soap". In the Daily Mirror, Jennifer Rodger called them a "refreshing change" and Tony Stewart deemed them "The daftest girls in Soapland and probably the funniest". Stewart was one of several critics to express displeasure over their axing, describing it as "a shame".

Jane Simon and Brian McIver of the Daily Record described them as "an adorable female double act [and] E20's answer to 2 Shoes", and wrote of their departure; "apparently there just isn't enough room for sunny, funny, glass-half-full types in Walford". A Huffington Post critic said they had "injected some humour into the famously gloomy soap". The Daily Mirror's Rodger said she was "sad" the duo had left, saying she "found their scenes together hilarious", hoping she would see both Babbington and Bright in a new show together. Bright stated during her first main stint in 2011, she received a lot of post telling her how much fans liked the double-act between Poppy and Jodie, and that they were a "breath of fresh air".
