= Jaada Lawrence-Green =

British actress and model

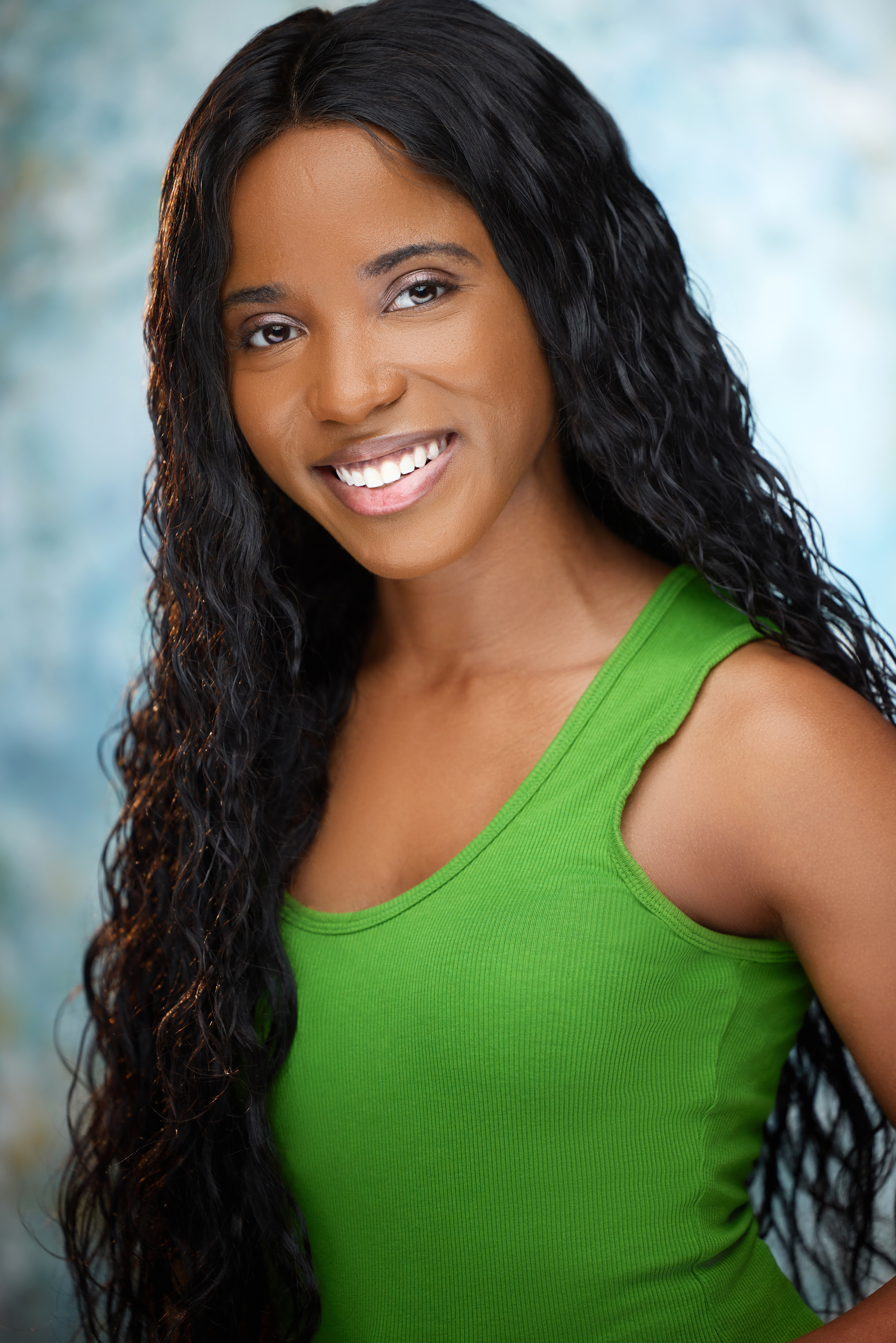
- Jaada Lawrence-Green in 2024
- Born: 26 July 1997 (age 29); Birmingham, England
- Occupation: Actress
- Years active: 1998-present
- Known for: Shadows of Death, Holby City, Breaking the Band

Jaada Lawrence-Green (born 26 July 1997) is a British actress and model. She began her professional career as a child model at the age of one years old and is known for her work on Black Widow, Diamond Bradley in The Shadows of Death, Kimberly Woodruff in Breaking the Band and Marnie Dawson in Holby City.

== Personal life ==
Lawrence-Green was born on 26 July 1997 in Birmingham, England and is of Jamaican descent.

== Career ==
Lawrence-Green has worked on stage, television, and film. In 1998, at one years old Lawrence-Green signed as a child model who showcased in numerous commercials and campaigns for clients including Boots, Benetton and Avery Labels. Since then, Lawrence-Green has continued to appear in various commercials and campaigns for companies including Google Play, Calor Gas, Ickle Bubba and Kenwood.

Lawrence-Green trained at Brit Youth Theatre School and Identity School of Acting. She began her acting career performing in theatre productions, with a stage debut in Footloose the musical in 2009. Lawrence-Green was cast as the lead character Diamond Bradley in The Shadows of Death, a crime series released on Investigation Discovery; Kimberly Woodruff, wife of American rapper Ice Cube in Breaking the Band; Cheerleader in Urban Myths; and guest starred as Marnie Dawson in television medical series Holby City. Lawrence-Green also starred as a double in Marvel's Black Widow for the character of Lerato.

In 2011, aged 13, Lawrence-Green discovered an interest in pop music. Lawrence-Green showcased her musical talent performing live at concerts and releasing original pop songs including "Rock It" in 2011, "Summertime" in 2012 and "Jump" in 2013 as a solo music artist named "Miss J". "Miss J" featured in various magazines including Urban Teen magazine, Just Kids Magazine and Starbound Magazine. Her music also featured on numerous radio stations including BBC radio, Alive radio and Off the Chart Radio.

As of 2024, Lawrence-Green's career continues to grow with achievements across multiple creative fields. She has featured in numerous commercials for brands including Skechers, Porsche, Nando's, Amazon, and Starbucks, showcasing her range and presence. On screen, she recently portrayed Hazel Gordy in Breaking the Band: The Jackson 5 on Reelz.

Lawrence-Green has also released original pop songs as a solo music artist, including "The One That Got Away," "You Make Me Feel Alive," and "Together Again." Her music has been recognised and featured on platforms such as BBC Radio, iHeartRadio, and Amazing Radio USA.

Furthermore, Lawrence-Green is the founder of Events Content, a content creation company specialising in user-generated content, branded content, and events content. Her clients include Kit Kat, John Lewis, Fabletics, Glamour, and Cantu.
