= Q & A (novel) =

First novel by Indian diplomat Vikas Swarup

- First edition
- Author: Vikas Swarup
- Language: English
- Genre: Drama
- Publisher: Doubleday
- Publication date: 2005
- Publication place: India
- Pages: 304
- ISBN: 978-0743267472
- OCLC: 57564932
- Dewey Decimal: 813/.6 22
- LC Class: PR9499.4.S93 Q13 2005

Q & A is a novel written by Indian diplomat Vikas Swarup and published in 2005. The novel is also Swarup's first novel work. It tells the rags to riches story of Ram Mohammad Thomas, a young waiter who becomes the biggest quiz show winner in history, only to be arrested and jailed on accusations that he cheated. His lawyer is the only thing standing between him and the producers' and police's attempt to force a false confession that would deprive him of the prize. The only way to prove his innocence is by sharing the episodes of his life and travels in India which explain where and how he learned the answers to the quiz show questions.

The book was loosely adapted into the multiple Oscar-winning 2008 film Slumdog Millionaire, which features a new main character named Jamal and his brother Salim.

== Characters ==
Ram Mohammad Thomas: The main character who tells his life story to the lawyer who came to the police station and wanted to help him. He is in love with Nita and believes firmly in destiny. He possesses a "lucky" coin that he uses when confronted with big decisions—but both sides are "heads". Generally, he has a very pessimistic and realistic view of life. His name stands for three religions because it is unknown which religion his parents had. He is an orphan like Salim.

Salim Ilyasi: Ram's best friend, who has dreams of becoming a Bollywood movie star. When he was younger, a fortuneteller predicted that he would be more famous than his Bollywood idol, which spurred his dreams. He is two years younger than Ram and has a clear, musical voice. He also believes firmly in destiny. To sum up, his character is coined as young and childish, compared to Ram Mohammed Thomas.

Prem Kumar: The host of the quiz show Who Will Win a Billion? (or W3B). Ram joins the show to take revenge. By the end of the book, he has helped Ram win the show and commits suicide in his car, though Ram suspects the show's producers had a hand in his death since Ram wasn't supposed to win the quiz show.

Smita Shah: Ram's lawyer and childhood friend. Though she is sceptical at first, she slowly comes to believe what he is telling her. Her real name is Gudiya, and she was the abused girl he mentioned in one of his stories — he promised to be like a brother to her and protect her so he pushed her drunkard father down the stairs.

Nita: A young prostitute with whom Ram falls in love. She bitterly tells Ram not to call her beautiful because that is the reason she was chosen instead of her plain-looking sister. Her brother is her pimp, so she implores Ram not to kill him. At the end of the book, she and Ram are married.

Shankar: When he was very young, he caught his mother and uncle in bed together and, as a result, his mother kicked him out. He still has the mind of a six-year-old boy and cries out coherently for his "Mummy" in his dreams when he is delirious from rabies. He has a blue notebook full of pictures that he has drawn for and of his mother.

Neelima Kumari: A famous actress who plays only female (tragic) lead roles and wants to stay "young" forever. Ram spent some time with her as a servant. She is based on Meena Kumari. Known as the "Tragedy Queen," she is abused by Prem Kumar but refuses to turn him in, saying that a true Tragedy Queen must possess real sadness in her life. She commits suicide, wanting to be remembered as the young and beautiful actress, but the police find her body a month later — after it has decomposed.

== Plot ==
The novel opens with Ram Mohammed Thomas "arrested" at night, a normal occurrence for slum dwellers. Ram has been terrified of it for years because he has taken lives and committed crimes to survive throughout his life. The police questioned him about the quiz show he starred in, Who Wants To Win a Billion? (W3B). Ram won the quiz show before the producers had enough money to award a first prize winner, so the police tried to get Ram to admit that he cheated and thus did not deserve the prize by torturing him. However, a girl called Smita Shah claimed herself as Ram's lawyer and asked the police to release him. Smita took Ram to her house and watched the show's DVD footage. Before watching the footage, Smita asked Ram to confess why he knew the answers, beginning the story.

=== 1,000 Rupees: The Death of a Hero ===
Ram is at the theater with his friend Salim, watching an action movie whose hero is Armaan Ali. Salim idolizes Armaan Ali and refuses to believe any bad rumors about him. Halfway through the movie, a man enters the theater and tries to touch his crotch; when Salim runs after him, he pulls off the man's fake beard to realize that it is the movie star, Armaan Ali in disguise. This is how Ram knew the first question: that Armaan Ali starred with Priya Kapoor in Betrayal.

=== 2,000 Rupees: The Burden of a Priest ===
The story covers the early years of Ram's life. Due to Ram's dark complexion, he was not popular among parents looking to adopt children from the orphanage and was abandoned shortly after finally being adopted after his foster parents' divorce. Subsequently, he was taken by Father Timothy, who gave him a Christian last name, a Muslim middle name, and a Hindu first name, both because the religion of Ram's birth parents was unknown, and also to protect him from the communal riots raging in India, but called him Thomas. Ram learned English and the Catholic faith from Father Timothy.

One day, a new priest called Father John came to the church, and Ram discovered in his belongings a gay magazine that he didn't understand. The whole story unfolds when a backpacker from England named Ian arrives at the church. One night, Thomas wakes and discovers Father John and Ian having sex. He rushes to Father Timothy as he thinks that Father John is harming Ian.

Father Timothy stopped them and sent Ian and Thomas to their rooms. The next day, Thomas discovers the dead body of Father Timothy under the cross; shot by Father John, who killed himself after. Ian cries with him as they have both lost a father; Thomas as he was his religious father and the one who looked after him, and Ian because he was Father Timothy's real child and moral burden -- as a priest formerly married and with a child.

Back to the present, the footage started with the second question: What is the sequence of letters normally inscribed on a cross? Ram, who learned everything about the Catholic church, answered INRI correctly.

=== 5,000 Rupees: A Brother's Promise ===
A family moved into the chawl where Ram and Salim resided. The family consists of Mr Shantaram, a self-claimed astronomer who had lost his job due to alcoholism; Shantaram's wife; Gudiya, Mr Shantaram’s daughter; and Pluto, the family's pet cat named after its small size, but later killed by Shantaram.

Mr. Shantaram domestically abused his family and sexually harassed Gudiya as time went by. Ram cannot stand with Shantaram when he sees Shantaram harassing Gudiya one day. The next day, he pushed Shantaram off the highest floor of the building. Ram believed that he killed Shantaram, so he fled from Mumbai to avoid persecution.

Smita said nothing but showed her deep feelings about the incident. They later watched the footage that went to the third question, which asked about the smallest planet in the Solar System. Ram responded with the correct answer, Pluto.

=== 10,000 Rupees: A Thought for the Crippled ===
Ram met a group of boys like him with different backgrounds. He befriended Salim, a young Muslim boy whose family was killed when Hindus burnt a bus full of Muslims in a religious vendetta, by giving him his second name: Mohammed. He also saved Salim from being sexually abused by Gupta, the director of the orphanage. Later, Ram and Salim were chosen by Sethji, a man known to change young people's lives. Ram discovers that Sethji's real plan is to maim helpless children and exploit them for his profit. At the orphanage, Sethji gives singing lessons of the bhajans of Surdas for Lord Krishna. The song hints at Ram of Sethji's intent to blind them in the future. Ram and Salim run away from the orphanage and move to Mumbai before they can be mutilated. It is also in this chapter where Ram is given a lucky coin.

Back to the present, Smita played the fourth question in the footage. The footage asked which god Surdas devoted, and Ram answered Lord Krishna correctly.

=== 50,000 Rupees: How to Speak Australian ===
In Delhi, Ram works for the Taylors, a rich, self-absorbed Australian family that habitually speaks badly of anyone. Ram finds that everyone who has worked for the Taylors is caught up in their wrongdoing, and Mr. Colonel Taylor, a defence attaché, catches them in the act.

One day, Ram picks up the phone to hear Mr. Colonel speak in code to a man panting on the other line. Ram notices that the Taylors take their rich lifestyle for granted. One day, Ram follows Mr. Taylor, who talks to Kumar, a strange Indian man. The next day, a new cook called Jai arrives to replace the last one, who thought he was in love with the Colonel's daughter. Jai attempts a heist in the house when the Taylors are on vacation, but abandons his efforts when he realizes the Taylors do not store any valuables in their house, particularly in Mr. Colonel's heavily fortified den. When Ram cleaned up the heist, he found that Mr. Colonel was a spy, but decided to make it secret. Mr. Colonel shows that he trusts Ram out of all his servants in his house for his suitable response to the heist.

The good days didn't go long. After six months, the Indian Foreign Office declared Mr. Colonel persona non grata for his activities incompatible and asked him to leave India. Ram took all his remaining salaries (52,000 rupees) and left Delhi.

Back to the footage, the host asked about the meaning of persona non grata, and Ram answered "the diplomat was not accepted" correctly.

=== 100,000 Rupees: Hold on to your Buttons ===
This chapter is about when Ram is living in Dharavi, Mumbai, working as a barman at Jimmy's Bar. Ram learns how to up his tips by taking advantage of people's drunkenness and getting them to buy more. However, through this learning experience, Ram meets some unusual characters; one in particular named Prakash Rao, who tells him all about his Haitian wife and his brother who died of a heart attack. The poor man is in despair as he pours out his story to Ram that he stole money from his brother, and his wife, who is a voodoo priestess, makes a voodoo doll of his brother for him. Prakash Rao admits to Ram that he had the guilty pleasure of taking all his troubles out on the voodoo doll of his brother, giving him painful headaches and small heart attacks. Prakash Rao soon found out that his brother died a week ago of a major heart attack that he had caused through the voodoo doll, only to drop dead while talking about his plans to kill his wife, having possibly fallen victim to a voodoo doll himself. Prakash mentioning the Capitol of Haiti while recalling his wife’s origins is how Ram knows the answer to the sixth question.

=== 200,000 Rupees: Murder on the Paschim Express ===
Ram travelled to Mumbai to see Salim after working for the Taylors. He travelled with the 52,000 rupees he had earned from working. He met a family and told their son about the money. Then, a robber came in and the son, who was jealous of Ram's money, ratted him out. Ram ends up killing one of the robbers by shooting him to protect the beautiful daughter of the family, but the other robber vanishes with his money. When killing the robber, Ram saw the gun labelled "Colt", "Lightweight", "Conn USA", and "DR 24691".

The seventh question in the chapter was who invented the revolver. Ram guessed Samuel Colt, which was the right answer.

=== 500,000 Rupees: A Soldier's Tale ===
The chapter rounds with Balwant Singh, an old servant. He shared his heroic war story from the time of the conflict between India and Pakistan without getting the Param Vir Chakra. His tale inspired everyone, including Ram. However, when the army arrived and spoke with Balwant, they revealed that Balwant was a liar — he had fled from his duty during the war. Balwant committed suicide the next day.

Back to the footage, the eighth question was which was the highest award to the Indian Armed Forces. Ram answered Param Vir Chakra correctly again.

=== 1,000,000 Rupees: License to Kill ===
In this chapter, Ram talks about meeting his best friend Salim again after five years. At first, he didn't want to see him, but then when they both sat down on a bench watching little kids playing football, they realized how much they missed each other and started talking about the time they were apart.

Salim talked about his past: he followed his dream to become an artist, he asked Mukesh Rawal if he could get a part in a film and he replied that he had to take some professional pictures and show them to him. Then he would become a junior artist. Junior artists play a role in the film for a few seconds and are only on the screen for about three seconds, but that's a good beginning for him. When Salim was taking his pictures, he got caught by the mob, who was going to burn him on a bus on which he was travelling.

Fortunately, a man named Ahmed threatened the criminals with a gun. Thus they escaped, and Ahmed took Salim to his home. From then on, Salim cleaned Ahmed's house and looked after it when Ahmed wasn't home. Ahmed was a man who bet on Indian cricket games and always won. After a while, Salim noticed that strange things were happening, such as Ahmed receiving yellow letters which contained information about a person, and then a few weeks later it would be announced on the news that this person had been murdered.

Salim found out that Ahmed was the man who killed these people, and he eventually saw that Ahmed was to kill Abbas Rizvi, who was a producer who had made a promise to Salim that he would make a star out of him. So Salim changed the photo for a photo of Mr Babu Pillai, alias Maman, the man who almost blinded Ram and Salim as boys. Salim left afterwards and didn't come back. A few months later, Salim heard that Ahmed was killed by the police in a shootout.

When it cuts back to the studio, Prem Kumar asked the ninth question: "How many Test centuries has India’s greatest batsman Sachin Malvankar scored?" Ram's choices were a) 34, b) 35, c) 36 or d) 37. He answers c) 36 and wins a million rupees.

=== 10,000,000 Rupees: Tragedy Queen ===
Ram lives as a servant in the house of Neelima Kumari, once a famous actress. The time Ram lives at her place, he discovers the sad and lonely life of an actress's faded glory. She was beaten and hurt by an unknown man. Neelima commits suicide in order to remain beautiful forever, but her body isn't found until weeks later when it is ugly and decomposed. After all this, Ram is able answer the question about Neelima Kumari in the quiz show.

=== 100,000,000 Rupees: X Gkrz Opknu (or A Love Story) ===
Ram ends up in a place near the Taj Mahal. He starts earning money by illegally guiding tourists. He finds shelter in a bunker nearby, where he befriends a boy who cannot speak properly. Then, he meets a group of rich boys, who take him to an expensive restaurant and to the Red Light District of Mumbai. He has sex with a young prostitute, Nita, and falls in love with her. She also loves him, but can't leave the brothel because of her brother, who acts as her pimp. Nita's brother tells Ram he needs 400,000 rupees to buy Nita her freedom. He steals the money from the rich woman who is the landlord of their home, using the information a former employee who was arrested for stealing gave him. After arriving at the hospital, Nita's brother ends up asking for more money as he accuses Ram of being responsible for Nita's injuries because she refused to do what her client asked her to do. Desperate, he gives his money to a man who desperately needs money to buy rabies treatment for his son. To thank him, the man gives him his card and asks Ram to call him so that he can repay him.

Back to the quiz show, a question on a Shakespeare play, "In which of the plays of Shakespeare, is one of the characters named 'Costard'?". Ram calls this man because he is an English teacher, but the teacher is unsure of the answer. Nevertheless, the teacher still tells Ram to go for the answer he is most sure of, which turns out to be the right answer, Love's Labours Lost.

=== 1,000,000,000 Rupees: The Thirteenth Question ===
The last question was asking about the key of Beethoven's work, Piano Sonata No. 29. But Ram didn't know the answer. Ram, however, confronted Prem Kumar and revealed his true intention of attending the show -- that was to meet and kill him. Ram explained that Prem was the man who hurt Neelima and severely abused Nita, the prostitute he called in Agra.

Prem offered to give him the answer to the question - that was B-flat major - in order to not get killed by Ram. Ram agreed and answered with the answer provided by Prem, and Ram won the show in the end.

=== Epilogue ===
Ram finishes his story, which he was telling to his lawyer, Smita. Smita tells him that she is not named Smita. She is Gudiya, the daughter of Mr. Shantaram, whom Ram thought he had killed – but in reality, Mr. Shantaram had only broken his leg and completely reformed himself. Now she knows Ram did not cheat, and she helps free him.

== Inspirations ==
The story's idea came from a local newspaper's report about children living in the Indian slums using mobile phones and the Internet. At around the same time, Charles Ingram, a British army major, was found guilty of cheating in the British version of the television show Who Wants to Be a Millionaire? To quote Swarup: “If a British army major can be accused of cheating, then an ignorant tiffin boy from the world's biggest slum can definitely be accused of cheating.”

== Reception ==
Q & A won the South Africa's Boeke Prize 2006. It was also nominated for the Best First Book by the Commonwealth Writers' Prize and won the Prix Grand Public at the 2007 Paris Book Fair.

To date, the book has sold translation rights in 43 languages, including Arabic, French, German, Italian, Dutch, Danish, Spanish, Greek, Romanian, Finnish, Slovenian, Croatian, Turkish, Icelandic, Chinese, Polish, Russian (Question — Answer), Norwegian, Swedish, Bulgarian, Serbian, Hindi, Gujarati (as Jackpot), Marathi, Punjabi, Tamil, Sinhala, Indonesian, Thai, Vietnamese, Japanese and Hebrew (both as The Riddle Boy from Mumbai), and Portuguese.

== See also ==
- Charles Ingram
