= Tower Stories =

- Directed by: Peter Greenaway
- Written by: Peter Greenaway
- Produced by: Markus Barmettler; Philip Lee
- Starring: Dustin Hoffman; Helen Hunt
- Cinematography: Ruzbeh Babol
- Music by: Luca D'Alberto
- Production companies: Cinatura; Jumpy Cow Pictures
- Countries: United States; Switzerland; China
- Language: English

Tower Stories (formerly titled Lucca Mortis) is an upcoming drama film directed by Peter Greenaway and starring Dustin Hoffman and Helen Hunt.

== Premise ==
An aging writer takes a sabbatical and travels with his family to Lucca, Italy in order to trace his ancestral roots and clean up the loose ends in his life.

== Cast ==
- Dustin Hoffman as Jacob
- Helen Hunt
- Sofia Boutella
- Jonno Davies
- Laura Morante
- Alessandro Gassmann
- Elena Sofia Ricci
- Luca Barbareschi
- Neri Marcorè
- Giacomo Gianniotti

== Production ==
In October 2019, it was announced that Morgan Freeman was to have produced and starred in the film.

Greenaway confirmed in a November 2023 interview with Screen International that Freeman was no longer involved with the film and that Hoffman was cast instead.

In December 2023, it was announced that filming began in Lucca. Filming continued to occur in Lucca in April 2024.

A 2026 release is planned.
