= East Street (Children in Need) =

2010 British television charity programme

- EastEnders and Coronation Street crossover event
- Written by: Daran Little
- Original air date: 19 November 2010

"East Street" is a charity crossover mini-episode between British soap operas Coronation Street and EastEnders. It was broadcast on 19 November 2010 as part of children's charity Children in Need's 2010 telethon on BBC One. Written by Daran Little, the non-canon short stars several actors from both television shows, and depicts humorous encounters between their characters.

== Plot ==
Sean Tully (Antony Cotton), Eileen Grimshaw (Sue Cleaver), Hayley Cropper (Julie Hesmondhalgh) and Sunita Alahan (Shobna Gulati) greet Christian Clarke (John Partridge), Darren Miller (Charlie G. Hawkins), Jane Beale (Laurie Brett), Zainab Masood (Nina Wadia) and Jodie Gold (Kylie Babbington) as they arrive in Weatherfield (in Greater Manchester) from Walford (in Greater London). Sean takes an immediate liking to Christian, while Zainab and Sunita argue about Asian accents and dress. Jodie is unable to walk on Coronation Street's cobbles in her high heels. Sean flirts with Christian and invites him out clubbing, but Christian says he has a boyfriend who he loves. Sunita, Hayley and Jane talk about life in their respective boroughs, saying that they are similar as nothing out of the ordinary ever happens. They say that Weatherfield and Walford would therefore be perfect for town twinning. Eileen invites Zainab into her home and Zainab is shocked to learn that Eileen has a gay son and a gay lodger, so she hurries out, and walks into the door frame. This scene can also be seen as a precursor to the December 2010 tram crash, as when the house shakes and Zainab asks what that was, Eileen says "Oh it was the tram - I've always said they'll be the death of me!"

Meanwhile, Dev Alahan (Jimmi Harkishin) and Michelle Connor (Kym Marsh) take photos of Albert Square. Jay Brown (Jamie Borthwick) wolf whistles at Michelle and points out a ladder in her tights. Dev goes off for a business meeting, while Michelle meets Alfie Moon (Shane Richie) and recognises him from a 2007 holiday in Spain. Inside The Queen Victoria, Kat Moon (Jessie Wallace) cannot understand Jason Grimshaw's (Ryan Thomas) accent, so Liz McDonald (Beverley Callard) serves him. Jason sees Whitney Dean (Shona McGarty) and they are attracted to each other. Kat tells Liz her skirt is too short after measuring it. Dev meets Masood Ahmed (Nitin Ganatra) in the Minute Mart shop where they talk about business and Asian stereotypes. When they part ways, Dev makes a call saying the shop is perfect, while Masood makes one saying Dev has fallen for his ruse. Kat is unhappy that her husband Alfie is talking to Michelle.

Gail McIntyre (Helen Worth) meets Denise Fox (Diane Parish) in Walford's café and asks if Denise is married. Denise says her husband is in prison for murdering her ex-husband. Gail says her husband killed his ex-wife and their neighbour. Denise says hers also killed his ex-wife, and then took her to the canal. Gail says hers drove her and her family into a canal. Denise says hers locked her in a basement, so Gail says it does not compare to being in prison, to which Fatboy (Ricky Norwood) says Gail is the winner. Michelle and Alfie sing karaoke but are stopped by Kat, who tells Michelle to get out of her pub. She then sees a charm on Liz's bracelet and asks her to explain it. Liz says she gave up a child for adoption and made charms out of two nappy pins, one which she kept and one which she gave to the adoptive parents to give to her daughter when she turned 18. Liz says they probably did not do that, but Kat says maybe they did, revealing an identical charm. Kat insists Liz is not her mother, but Liz says she is (as a reference to the majorly recognised Kat and Zoe cliffhanger from 2001).

== Background ==
The crossover was announced on 8 November 2010 as part of the BBC One telethon for the children's charity Children in Need. It is the first time characters from both shows come face-to-face, and takes place on the sets of both programmes, including the Rovers Return Inn and The Queen Victoria public houses. EastEnders cast who took part in the mini-episode were Laurie Brett (Jane), Charlie G. Hawkins (Darren), Kylie Babbington (Jodie), Nina Wadia (Zainab), John Partridge (Christian), Diane Parish (Denise), Jessie Wallace (Kat), Shane Richie (Alfie), Ricky Norwood (Fatboy), Nitin Ganatra (Masood), Shona McGarty (Whitney) and Jamie Borthwick (Jay). The stars from Coronation Street who appear are Sue Cleaver (Eileen), Antony Cotton (Sean), Julie Hesmondhalgh (Hayley), Shobna Gulati (Sunita), Beverley Callard (Liz), Kym Marsh (Michelle), Helen Worth (Gail), Jimmi Harkishin (Dev) and Ryan Thomas (Jason).

Callard, Marsh, Worth, Harkishin and Thomas visited the EastEnders set, Partridge, Hawkins, Brett, Wadia and Babbington visited the Coronation Street set, while the other cast members remained on their respective usual sets.

== Cast reactions ==
On filming on the EastEnders set, Callard said, "I've visited the EastEnders set many years ago but this is the first time I've worked on it and it was great. We've had a great time and the script is so funny. It's so good." Parish added: "It's been an honour and a pleasure. I think they should do more of it actually. It's been a lot of fun and I was slightly nervous but very honoured to be working with Helen Worth. I think she's lovely and I've always loved her character." Marsh opined: "It's been such fun. That's the one word I can honestly say and it's been very funny. Of all the soaps, we're the two that don't really see each other that much or get to mingle, probably because of the distance and all the rivalry stuff that people make up. So it's nice to show that we do get on and it's been a pleasure." Richie said filming with Coronation Street stars on the Albert Square set was "very surreal", adding "I loved watching their reactions when I showed them round the Square. And seeing Bev [Callard] and Jessie [Wallace] behind the bar was strange."

Hesmondhalgh said the experience was exciting but nerve-wracking, and said her character Hayley probably has a crush on Christian when they meet. Wadia joked that the Coronation Street cast were slightly arrogant and obnoxious, while Cleaver said it was as if the EastEnders cast had been on the Coronation Street set forever. Babbington was also excited and said she had fun, and Worth was also very nervous. Borthwick thought the crossover was something that should have been done a long time ago. Norwood said the scene between Kat and Liz was nice because of the similarities between the characters.

A month after the broadcast of "East Street", Callard, who later departed from Coronation Street in 2011, said she loved filming the scenes with Wallace and they could not stop laughing. She added that she would love to play Kat's mother in EastEnders for real.

== Reception ==
Before airing, Mark Jefferies from the Daily Mirror called the episode "bizarre". Andy Welch for AOL Television said, "They might be fierce rivals when it comes to ratings and awards, but it's nice to see Coronation Street and EastEnders can bury the hatchet for a good cause." Katie Byrne from the Evening Herald said the episode was "comedy gold" and the best moment of the entire telethon, adding that the conversation between Gail and Denise was the funniest scene, as it poked fun of the soaps' often similar storylines, and praising the cast and writers for parodying soap stereotypes, exaggerating storylines and poking fun at themselves. Kevin O'Sullivan from the Daily Mirror said the crossover was "kind of excruciating." In her review of soap operas in the second half of 2010, Ruth Deller from lowculture.co.uk said that "East Street" deserved a special mention as it was "great fun, especially the evil husband top trumps scene."

== See also ==
- List of EastEnders television spin-offs
- Coronation Street § Crossovers
- Corriedale (crossover episode)
