= Urban Myths (TV series) =

British comedy drama TV series

- Genre: Comedy drama
- Country of origin: United Kingdom
- Original language: English
- No. of series: 4
- No. of episodes: 26

Production
- Running time: 21–26 minutes
- Production company: Sky UK

Original release
- Network: Sky Arts
- Release: 19 January 2017 – 28 October 2020

Urban Myths is a British biographical comedy drama anthology television series first aired on 19 January 2017 on the Sky Arts. Each episode featured an anecdote surrounding popular culture loosely based on a true story, ranging from Muhammad Ali talking a man down from a ledge to Bob Dylan turning up on a stranger's doorstep in London. A second series was announced featuring The Sex Pistols and Salvador Dalí, which began airing on 12 April 2018.

The series was most notable for a controversy surrounding the casting of Joseph Fiennes in the role of Michael Jackson, an episode that was pulled from the transmission.

== Episodes ==
Series	Episodes	Originally released	
Series	Episodes	First released	Last released
1	6	19 January 2017	16 February 2017
2	8	12 April 2018	31 May 2018
3	8	10 April 2019	29 May 2019
4	4	7 October 2020	28 October 2020

=== Series 1 (2017) ===
No. overall	No. in season	Title	Directed by	Written by	Original release date	UK viewers (millions)
1	1	"Bob Dylan: Knockin' on Dave's Door"	Ben Palmer	Neil Webster	19 January 2017	0.13
Starring: Eddie Marsan as Bob Dylan, Paul Ritter as Dave, Katherine Parkinson as Ange, Cavan Clerkin as Taxi Driver, and Jessica Gunning as Border Officer
2	2	"Waiting for Andre"	Ben Palmer	Neil Forsyth	26 January 2017	0.09
Starring: David Threlfall as Samuel Beckett, Liam Macdonald as André the Giant
3	3	"Adolf Hitler the Artist"	Dan Zeff	Ben Edwards	2 February 2017	0.09
Starring: Iwan Rheon as Adolf Hitler, Rupert Grint as August Kubizek, Dustin Demri-Burns as Josef, James Fleet as The Professor, Vincent Franklin as Alexander
4	4	"When Cary Grant Introduced Timothy Leary to LSD"	Geoffrey Sax	Roger Drew & Ed Dyson	9 February 2017	0.04
Starring: Ben Chaplin as Cary Grant, Aidan Gillen as Timothy Leary
5	5	"The Greatest. Of All Time."	Ben Palmer	Neil Webster and Mark Boutros	16 February 2017	0.08
Starring: Noel Clarke as Muhammad Ali, Danny John-Jules as Don King, Osy Ikhile as Joe, Lucian Msamati as Herbert Muhammad
6	6	"Elizabeth, Michael and Marlon"	Ben Palmer	Neil Forsyth	N/A	N/A
Starring: Joseph Fiennes as Michael Jackson, Brian Cox as Marlon Brando, Stockard Channing as Elizabeth Taylor, Carrie Fisher as herself

=== Series 2 (2018) ===
No. overall	No. in season	Title	Directed by	Written by	Original release date	UK viewers (millions)
7	1	"Marilyn Monroe and Billy Wilder: "It's Me, Sugar""	Sean Foley	David Cummings	12 April 2018	0.21
Starring: Gemma Arterton as Marilyn Monroe, James Purefoy as Billy Wilder, Adam Brody as Jack Lemmon, Felicity Montagu as Paula Strasberg, Alex Pettyfer as Tony Curtis, Dougray Scott as Arthur Miller
8	2	"Backstage at Live Aid"	John Hardwick	Neil Forsyth	19 April 2018	0.12
Starring: Jonas Armstrong as Bob Geldof, David Avery as Freddie Mercury, Seb Cardinal as Rick Parfitt, Martin Compston as Midge Ure, Karla Crome as Sade, Dustin Demri-Burns as Francis Rossi, Kerry Howard as Marsha Hunt, Rufus Jones as Elton John, Con O'Neill as Tony
9	3	"Johnny Cash and the Ostrich"	Al Campbell	Frank Skinner	26 April 2018	0.08
Starring: Frank Skinner as Johnny Cash, Isy Suttie as Jean, Toby Williams as Mike
10	4	"The Dalí and The Cooper"	Iain Forsyth & Jane Pollard	Roger Drew & Ed Dyson	3 May 2018	N/A
Starring: David Suchet as Salvador Dalí, Noel Fielding as Alice Cooper, Paul Kaye as Shep Gordon, Sheila Hancock as Gala Dalí, Alice Cooper as himself
11	5	"When Bowie Met Bolan"	Jim O'Hanlon	Freddy Syborn	10 May 2018	0.11
Starring: Luke Treadaway as David Bowie, Jack Whitehall as Marc Bolan, Adrian Edmondson as Leslie Conn
12	6	"The Mysterious Case of Agatha Christie"	Guillem Morales	Paul Doolan & Abigail Wilson	17 May 2018	N/A
Starring: Anna Maxwell Martin as Agatha Christie, Bill Paterson as Arthur Conan Doyle, Rosie Cavaliero as Dorothy L. Sayers, Mark Bonnar as Billy, Adrian Scarborough as Chief Inspector Danders, Nick Mohammed as Horace Lambardi, Robert James-Collier as Archie Christie
13	7	"Public Enemy (feat. Kev Wells)"	Ben Palmer	Neil Webster	24 May 2018	0.07
Starring: Philip Glenister as Kev Wells, Paterson Joseph as Chuck D, Abdul Salis as Flavor Flav, Tanya Franks as Becca, Sidney Kerr as Martin, Lauren Socha as Amy, Steve Edge as Barry, Steve Oram as Brian
14	8	"The Sex Pistols vs. Bill Grundy"	Simon Delaney	Simon Nye	31 May 2018	0.09
Starring: Steve Pemberton as Bill Grundy, Daniel Mays as Mike Housego, Rachel Bright as Christine Whitehead, William Kettle as Paul Cook, Frankie Fox as Johnny Rotten, Charlie Wernham as Steve Jones, Matt Whitchurch as Glen Matlock, Kayvan Novak as Freddie Mercury, Laurence Howarth as Tony Bulley, Kieran Hodgson as Malcolm McLaren, Maisie Adam as Siouxsie Sioux

=== Series 3 (2019) ===
No. overall	No. in season	Title	Directed by	Written by	Original release date	UK viewers (millions)
15	1	"Princess Diana, Freddie and Kenny: 'One Normal Night'"	Sean Foley	Pete Jackson	10 April 2019	0.25
Starring: Sophie Rundle as Diana, Princess of Wales, David Avery as Freddie Mercury, Mathew Baynton as Kenny Everett, Richard Gadd as Gareth
16	2	"Andy & The Donald"	Molly Manners	Ben Boyer	17 April 2019	0.10
Starring: Anthony Atamanuik as Donald Trump, Jack McBrayer as Andy Warhol, Natasia Demetriou as Agnieszka, Rich Hall as Jimmy Gould, Pearl Mackie as Kay Fortson, Paul Putner as Howard, Jaada Lawrence-Green as Cheerleader
17	3	"Bleak House Guest"	Robert Delamere	Jess Jackson	24 April 2019	0.07
Starring: Stephen Mangan as Charles Dickens, Ian Hart as Hans Christian Andersen, Monica Dolan as Catherine Dickens
18	4	"The Trial of Joan Collins"	Elliot Hegarty	Andrew Dawson, Steve Dawson, Tim Inman and David Walliams	1 May 2019	0.05
A one-hour episode. Starring: Victoria Hamilton as Joan Collins, Michael Brandon as Robert Calgary, Haydn Gwynne as Joni Evans, Mark Heap as Ken Burrows, Dominique Moore as Journalist, Vincenzo Nicoli as Alberto Vitale, David Walliams as Monty
19	5	"Grace Under Pressure"	Ollie Parsons	Grace Ofori-Attah	8 May 2019	0.08
Starring: Gloria Onitri as Grace Jones, David Ajala as The Burglar, Emily Atack as Debbie Harry, Joshua McGuire as Jean-Paul Goude, David Mills as Andy Warhol,
20	6	"Madonna and Basquiat"	Sarah Solemani and Adam Wimpenny	Sarah Solemani	15 May 2019	0.08
Starring: Sophie Kennedy Clark as Madonna, Calvin Demba as Jean-Michel Basquiat, Paul Kaye as Piano Man, David Bamber as Drunk
21	7	"Scrambled Eggs"	Simon Delaney	Simon Nye	22 May 2019	0.04
Starring: Tom Connor as Paul McCartney, James Coward as John Lennon, Rosie Day as Jane Asher, Hugh Dennis as Richard Asher, Simon Gordon as George Harrison, Juliet Howland as Margaret Asher, Jordan Scowen as Ringo Starr
22	8	"Mick & Margaret"	Ben Palmer	Neil Forsyth	29 May 2019	0.07
Starring: Jamie Campbell Bower as Mick Jagger, Kelly Macdonald as Princess Margaret, Countess of Snowdon

=== Series 4 (2020) ===
No. overall	No. in season	Title	Directed by	Written by	Original release date	UK viewers (millions)
23	1	"Les, Miserable"	Steve Bendelack	Steve Pemberton	7 October 2020	N/A
Starring: John Bradley as young Les Dawson, Mark Addy as older Les. Steve Pemberton as Jean-Paul Sartre
24	2	"When Joan Kissed Barbra"	Sue Perkins	Sue Perkins	14 October 2020	N/A
Starring: Katherine Ryan as Joan Rivers, Jessica Barden as Barbra Streisand
25	3	"Hendrix & Handel"	Justin Chadwick	Cara Jennings & Sophie Trott	21 October 2020	N/A
Starring: Zach Wyatt as Jimi Hendrix, David Haig as George Frideric Handel, Harriet Cains as Kathy Etchingham
26	4	"F for Fakenham: When Orson Welles went to Norwich"	Richard Curson Smith	Matthew Broughton	28 October 2020	N/A
Starring: Robbie Coltrane as Orson Welles, Saoirse-Monica Jackson as Janet, the newswoman

== Reception ==
Although stories surrounding the pulled episode overshadowed the rest of the series, the aired episodes attracted a positive response. The opening episode, featuring Eddie Marsan as Bob Dylan, was described in approving newspaper reviews as "charming and hilarious", "short, charming and light-hearted" and "different and pleasing". The episode Waiting for Andre, written by Neil Forsyth concerned the real-life friendship between Samuel Beckett and a teenage Andre the Giant and was called a "gorgeous and sumptuous half-hour" by Observer who noted it was a "great shame Beckett himself didn't get to enjoy this delightful slice of life". Forsyth was nominated for a 2018 Writer's Guild Award for Waiting For Andre in the Best Short Form TV Drama category. The series drew over 600,000 viewers and charted in the top three programmes for Sky Arts each week it aired, save for the episode "Cary Grant and Timothy Leary", which came seventh, largely due to broadcasts of the programme Portrait Artist of the Year.

=== Controversy ===
After it was revealed that Joseph Fiennes was to portray Michael Jackson in the series, several members of Jackson's family objected, including his daughter, Paris Jackson, who wrote on Twitter, "I'm so incredibly offended by it, as I'm sure plenty of people are as well, and it honestly makes me want to vomit." The tweet was later deleted. After widespread criticism following the release of the series trailer, the episode was pulled from broadcast indefinitely.

=== Accolades ===
Year	Award	Category	Nomination	Result
2018	International Emmy Awards	Best Drama Series	Urban Myths	Nominated
2018	Writers Guild Awards	Best Short Form TV Drama	Neil Forsyth	Nominated
