= Children in Need 2010 =

- Genre: Telethon
- Presented by: Terry Wogan; Tess Daly; Fearne Cotton; Peter Andre
- Narrated by: Alan Dedicoat
- Country of origin: United Kingdom
- Original language: English

Production
- Production location: BBC Television Centre
- Camera setup: Multiple
- Running time: 385 minutes

Original release
- Network: BBC One; BBC One HD
- Release: 19 November 2010

Related
- Children in Need 2009; Children in Need 2011

Children in Need 2010 was a campaign held in the United Kingdom to raise money for Children in Need. 2010 marked the 30th anniversary of the appeal which culminated in a live broadcast on BBC One, which began on the evening of Friday 19 November and ran until the early hours of Saturday 20th. The broadcast was hosted by Terry Wogan, with Tess Daly from 7 pm until 10 pm and Fearne Cotton from 10:35 pm until 2 am. Peter Andre hosted from the BT Tower.

The show was broadcast from BBC Television Centre in London but also included regional opt-outs hosted from various locations around the UK including Cardiff and Glasgow, viewers in Northern Ireland could see the whole show Live from London for the first time instead of having their own opt out as in previous years instead the Northern Ireland concert was broadcast live on BBC Radio Ulster and highlights on BBC One Northern Ireland the next day with Reggie Yates and John Daly. They returned to Belfast every so often to show fundraising from Northern Ireland but it wasn't a Live broadcast as in previous years.

In 2010 contributions fell short of the previous year's fund-raising total. The 2010 event raised £18,098,199 compared to £20,309,747 in 2009.

== Appeals ==
=== Slogan ===
- "Show your spots, Let's Raise Lots"

=== Sketches ===
- "Come Dine With Dragons" – Come Dine with Me/Dragons' Den crossover episode
- "East Street" – Coronation Street/EastEnders crossover episode
- Merlin
- Doctor Who tea party featuring a preview of the 2010 Christmas special, "A Christmas Carol".

=== Professional performances ===
In Order of Appearance:

- Cheryl Cole - "Promise This"
- Westlife - "Safe" (from Belfast)
- Kylie Minogue - "Better than Today"
- The Saturdays - "Higher" (from Cardiff)
- JLS - "Love You More"
- Susan Boyle - "Perfect Day"
- Alexandra Burke - "Start Without You" (from Glasgow)
- Take That - "The Flood" and "Never Forget"
- We Will Rock You cast. (from Glasgow)
- Only Men Aloud "Don't Stop Believing"
- Tom Jones
- Jedward "All The Small Things"
- Pixie Lott - "Turn it Up"
- The Script (from Belfast) "Nothing"
- McFly - "Shine a Light" (from Glasgow)
- Cee Lo Green - "Forget You"
- Phantom of the Opera - "Music of the Night"
- Ellie Goulding - "Starry Eyed"
- Maroon 5 "Give a Little More"
- Heaven 17 "Temptation"
- Alesha Dixon - "Radio" (pre-orders of the single will be donated to the charity)
- The Wanted - "All Time Low"

=== Charity special performances ===
- Peter Andre – Michael Jackson tribute, singing "Man in the Mirror".
- The BBC newsreaders performed a Lady Gaga inspired skit choreographed by Louie Spence. Featured songs were "Poker Face", "Paparazzi" and "Bad Romance".
- Loose Women performing "The Promise" by Girls Aloud.
- A Children in Need Strictly Come Dancing special featuring Harry Judd off McFly competing against Rochelle Wiseman off the Saturdays.
- Hairy Bikers performing Meat Loaf's "Bat Out of Hell".

=== Children in Need: 50 Greatest Moments ===
A two part special Children in Need: 50 Greatest Moments aired on BBC Three, on 9 and 16 November and featured top moments of the appeal throughout the years as well as some of the celebrities who participated in them. The top 10 was also shown on the Telethon.

== Locations ==
- BBC Television Centre, London
- SECC, Glasgow - hosted by Jackie Bird and John Barrowman
- Millennium Stadium, Cardiff - hosted by The One Show host, Alex Jones
- Odyssey Arena, Belfast - hosted by BBC Northern Ireland's John Daly and BBC Radio 1 host Reggie Yates

=== Regional opt-outs ===
- BBC East - Norwich at The Forum
- BBC East Midlands - Leicestershire at East Midlands Airport
- BBC London - London - Outside BBC Television Centre
- BBC North East and Cumbria - Cockermouth on Main Street
- BBC North West - Liverpool at The World Museum
- BBC South - Bournemouth - Adventure Wonderland
- BBC South East - Maidstone at Leeds Castle
- BBC South West - Plymouth at The University of Plymouth
- BBC West - Bristol at Bristol Zoo
- BBC West Midlands - Coventry at Planet Ice
- BBC Yorkshire - York at The Yorkshire Museum
- BBC Yorkshire and Lincolnshire - Skegness at The Embassy Theatre

== Official single ==
"Love You More" by JLS is the official single.

== Other activities ==
As in previous years, the TV show Countryfile sold a calendar in aid of the appeal.

The BBC Radio 4 show PM released a CD of listeners' performances of the title music for Upstairs, Downstairs, composed by Alexander Faris, in a variety of styles from bossa nova to heavy metal, raising over £70,000.

A number of high-profile charity events not directly affiliated with the BBC also contributed a large amount of cash for the 2010 appeal, such as the Chris Evans 'Drive and Dine Magnificent Seven' motorsport event held in Hampshire at Chewton Glen.

== Totals ==
The following are totals with the times they were announced on the televised show.

Date	Time	Total
19 November 2010	19:49 GMT	£5,753,764
19 November 2010	20:32 GMT	£8,356,800
19 November 2010	22:39 GMT	£12,314,005
19 November 2010	23:28 GMT	£13,224,202
20 November 2010	00:00 GMT	£14,560,701
20 November 2010	01:00 GMT	£16,162,347
20 November 2010	02:00 GMT	£18,098,199

Total number of phone calls during the telethon

BT said that it handled 185,066 calls from viewers across the country during the event. Steve Smith, BT's eDonate platform manager, said: "At peak times, the BT network was handling more than 42 calls every second. More than 5,000 volunteers in 51 call centres across the UK manned the phone lines, answering more than 185,000 calls, which was a great way to celebrate 30 years of telethons."

== See also ==
- Children in Need
- Pudsey Bear
