= Kylie Babbington =

British actress (b. 1987)

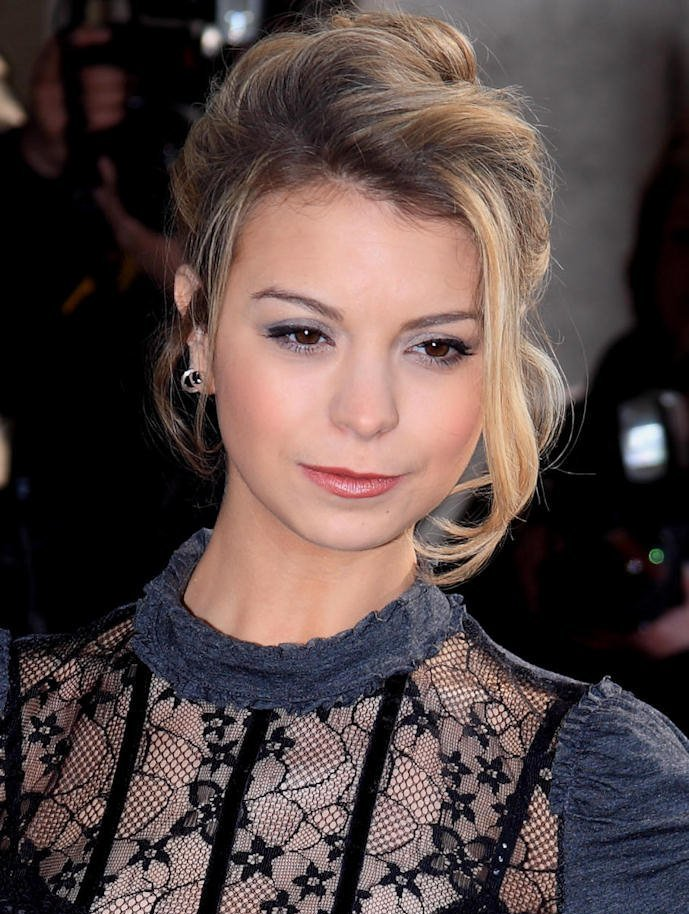
- Kylie Babbington (2011)
- Born: Kylie Jane Babbington; 13 December 1987 (age 38); Havering, London, England
- Education: Italia Conti Academy of Theatre Arts
- Occupations: Actress, writer
- Years active: 2010–2011
- Spouse: James Lynch (m. 2017)

Kylie Jane Babbington (born 13 December 1987) is an English former actress and comedy writer best known for her single television role, playing Jodie Gold on EastEnders from June 2010 to November 2011.

== Early life and education ==
Babbington was born in Havering, London in 1987. She studied acting and musical theatre at the Italia Conti Academy of Theatre Arts, where she appeared in productions of Assassins, Elergies, Essex Girls and Odin.

She is the daughter of James Babbington and Wendy Wooldridge, and has a younger brother named Joel George Babbington, born in 1991. Kylie attended the Sylvia Young Theatre School.

== Life and career ==
In 2010 she was cast in the BBC soap opera EastEnders as Jodie Gold, daughter of Vanessa Gold (Zöe Lucker) and a love interest for Darren Miller (Charlie G. Hawkins). Babbington's character was written out in November 2011. Babbington's other on-screen appearances include participation in the 2010 edition of Children in Need, where she played Jodie in East Street, a crossover between EastEnders and rival soap opera Coronation Street.

She married James Lynch on October 6, 2017.

== Awards and nominations ==
Year	Award	Category	Result	Ref.
2011	The British Soap Awards	Sexiest Female	Longlisted	
