= Springbank Secondary College =

Coordinates: 34.992853°S 138.591468°E

- Daws Road, Pasadena; Australia

Information
- Type: High school
- Motto: igniting, inquisitive imagination
- Established: 1965
- School district: Inner-south
- Principal: Andrew Dunn
- Staff: 36 teaching staff 20 school services officers
- Enrolment: 174 (2020)
- Colours: Navy, aqua, white & purple
- Website: springbanksc.sa.edu.au

Springbank Secondary College (formerly known as Pasadena High School) is a public high school in the suburb of Pasadena in southern Adelaide, South Australia. The inclusive school is on the corner of Goodwood Road and Daws Road. Springbank is a specialist basketball school. In 2017 it also adopted a science, technology, engineering, arts, and maths focus, and announced formal links with the Australian Science and Mathematics School and Flinders University.

The school's basketball academy is led by Brendan Mann - said to be one of the best junior players ever to play in SA. Mann played over 200 NBL games for Canberra, Brisbane, and Newcastle. He has coached in Europe and was a FIBA scout for the 2017 Under 19 Men's World Cup.

Springbank has a high-ranking ice hockey team, Springbank Sabres, which has won numerous awards, and a dedicated disability unit in an inclusive model where the students with disabilities learn and socialise alongside their mainstream peers. It also offers "Doorways 2 Construction", run in collaboration with the Construction Industry Training Board (CITB), TAFE and ATEC. The program is offered to Year 11 and 12 students through the Inner South Curriculum Alliance. Students complete 10 units of course work developed by the CITB as part of its Certificate I in General Construction program.

== Community ==
The school is home to the historic Tower Arts Centre, the South Australian Light Opera Society, and the Sturt Sabres Basketball Club.

Springbank's oval is utilised by the community – Cumberland United FC's junior teams train there, and the nearby Colonel Light Gardens Primary School uses the oval for all its cricket training and games. Morphettville Park Cricket Club also uses the oval as its second senior home ground from Oct-Mar each year.

== History ==
Springbank opened in 1965 as Daws Road High School and operated under this name until 2001, when it was renamed Pasadena High School. It changed its name again on 8 February 2019 when it re-launched as a small school by design for up to 450 students.

At one point this school had an enrolment upwards of 1200. However, after a steady decline, it had 148 students in 2015, this fell further to 110 by early 2017 after a move to amalgamate the school with Unley High School was voted down by parents. By 2020 the school's numbers had increased, however, remained the lowest student numbers for Adelaide high schools at 174 students.

In 2017 the school was awarded $10 million for refurbishment works from the state government's Building Better Schools initiative. In 2018 the school released an initial plan showing the funds would be spent on upgrading core buildings, adding a sports science centre linked to the current school's basketball stadium and improving the overall look and feel of the school.

In 2020 the school community won a grassroots battle to save the school from government closure and secured its long-term future through the guarantee of the $10 million capital upgrade. At that time the government made Springbank into an unzoned school, meaning anyone in South Australia could apply to attend. Simultaneously the zone of Unley High School was extended.

== Notable alumni ==
- Andrea Chaplin, Australian fencer, Dual Olympian
- Brad Newley, Dual Olympic basketball player
- Danyle Pearce, former AFL footballer
- Glenn Ridge, former Sale of the Century host and radio presenter
- Kate Ellis, former Federal MP
- Joe Ingles, Olympic basketballer
- John Schumann, Redgum musician
- Liam Macdonald, actor
- Martin Hamilton-Smith, former state MP
- Scott Ninnis, Basketballer and former Adelaide 36ers coach
- Scott Welsh, former AFL footballer
- Tracy Mann, actress
- Wayne Phillips, Australian cricket player
