= Darshan Doshi =

Indian drummer and composer

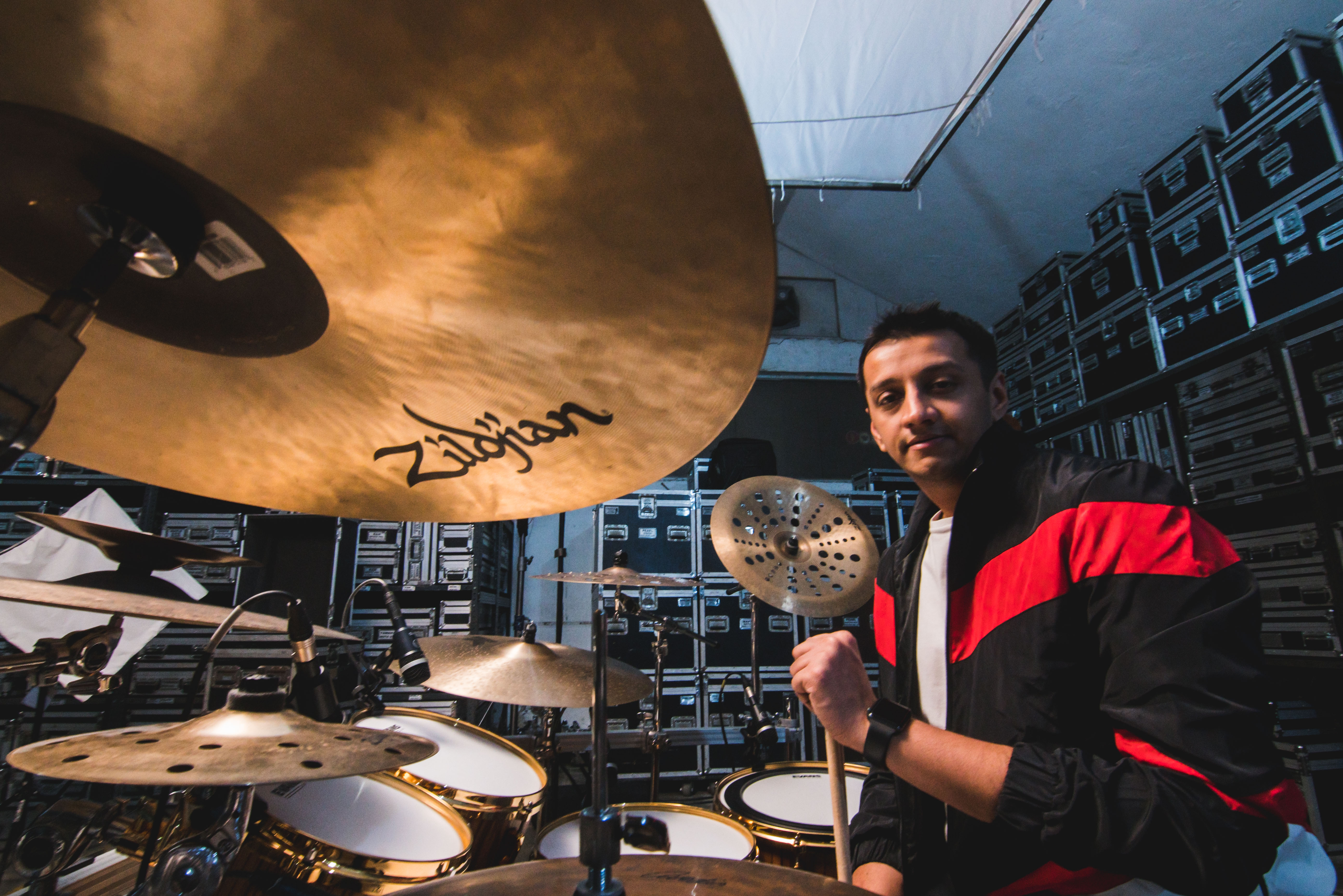

Background information
- Born: 16 January 1986 (age 40); Mumbai, India
- Genre: Alt Rock
- Occupations: Drummer, percussionist
- Instruments: Drums, Drum set
- Years active: 1997 – present
- Website: darshandoshiofficial.net

Darshan Doshi (born 16 January 1986) is an Indian drummer and composer, who is currently touring with Salim–Sulaiman, Farhan Akhtar, Adnan Sami, Diljit Dosanjh and Amit Trivedi. He has played drums for several Bollywood films such as Rock On, Black, Dhoom 2, Bhaag Milkha Bhaag, Queen, Secret Superstar, Fitoor, and Dear Zindagi.

Based in Mumbai, Darshan started performing at the age of 2 and has established his name in the Limca Books of Records as the youngest drummer of India in 1997. He also was part of the kids group "Little Wonders" by Kalyanji Anandji. He has performed with all leading composers in India such as AR Rahman, Amit trivedi, Shankar–Ehsaan–Loy, Pritam, and Vishal–Shekhar.

He is also an integral part of Coke Studio India and MTV Unplugged.

He currently endorses Pearl Drums, Zildjian Cymbals, Evans Drumheads, Vicfirth sticks, and AKG Mics.

== Early life and training ==
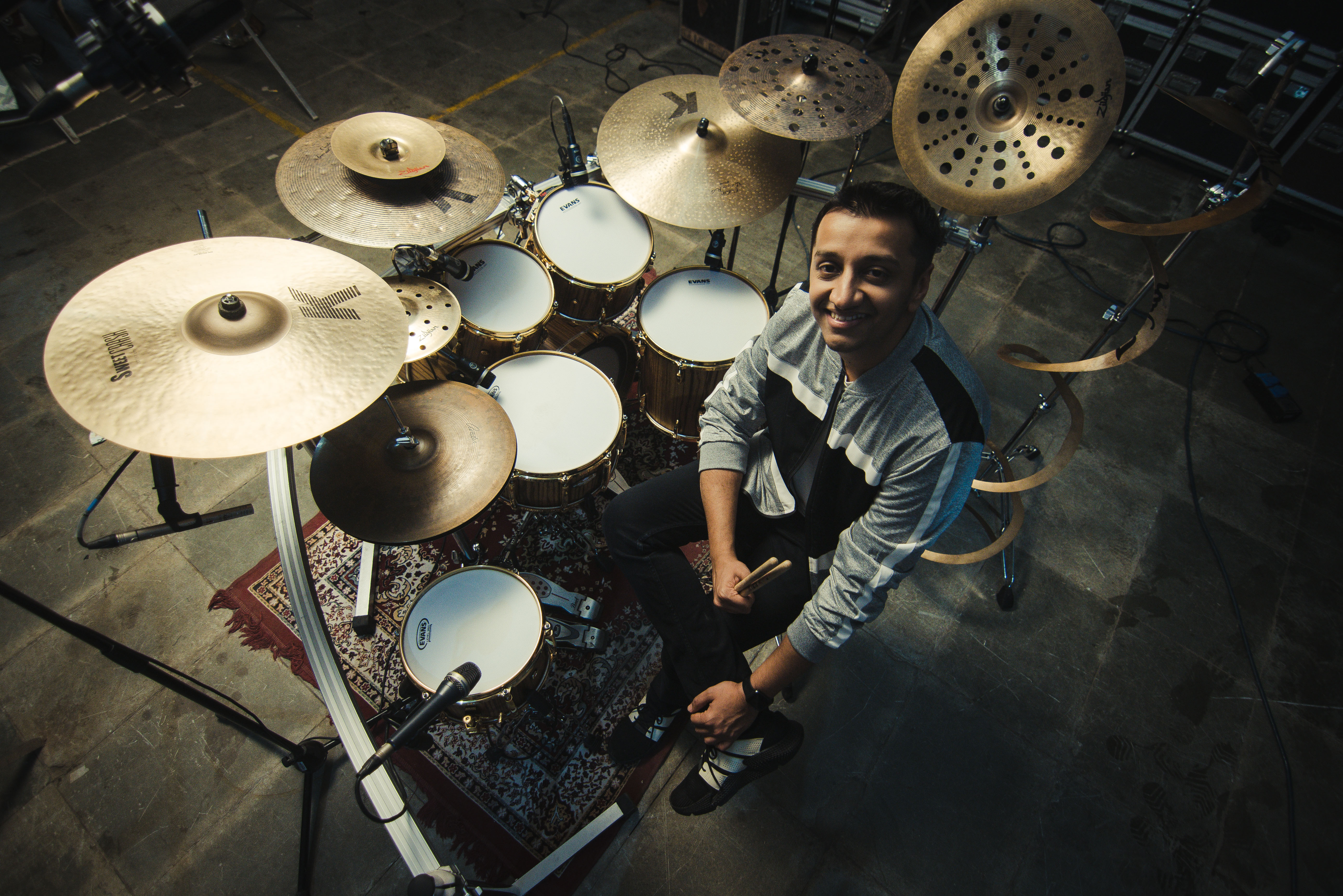

Born to Shailesh and Surbhi Doshi in Mumbai, his father was his first guru. Later, Darshan was trained in the drums by Pankaj Sharma and Ranjit Barot. His younger brother, Umang Doshi, plays keyboards with Arijit Singh and Farhan Akhtar.

== Career ==
In 1997, his name was entered in the Limca Book of Records as the youngest drummer of India.

Darshan has played drum set for the movie 'Black'. He played percussion and drums for Paheli, and Ram Gopal Varma's Sarkar, as well as for London Dreams, Tere Sang, Dhoom 2, Johnny Gaddar, and Rock On!!. Over the years he has worked with music directors like Shankar–Ehsaan–Loy, Anu Malik, N M Kareem, Sandesh Shandilya, Salim–Sulaiman, Pritam, Vishal & Shekhar, Amit Trivedi and Raghav Sachar. Most notably he was original drummer for the film Rock On!! (2008).

He has also performed on MTV India's live music performance series, Coke Studio & MTV Unplugged

Darshan has also been associated with bands including “Fuzonica", "Aakruti", "Defying Gravity", "Tapasya", and "Nakshatra".

Currently, he is working with music trio Shankar, Ehsaan & Loy as a rhythmist. In December 2011, he was part of their 12-piece band which toured Middle-East and performed at Abu Dhabi.

== Filmography ==
- Black (Haan Maine Chukar - Monty Sharma) (2005)
- Paheli (2005)
- Sarkar (2005)
- Dhoom 2 (2006)
- Johnny Gaddar (2007)
- Rock On!! (2008)
- Luck by Chance (2009)
- Sikandar (2009)
- London Dreams (2009)
- Teree Sang (2009)
- My Name Is Khan (2010)
- Bhaag Milkha Bhaag (2013)
- ‘’ Fitoor’’ 2018
- ‘m Dear Zindagi 2016
- Notebook
- Saandh ki Aankh
- Kabir Singh
- M.S.Dhoni

== Live performances ==
Darshan Doshi is currently performing live shows with:

- Farhan Akhtar
- Shankar–Ehsaan–Loy
- Hariharan
- Raghav Sachar
- Salim–Sulaiman
- Adnan Sami
- Vishal–Shekhar
- Ashwin Srinivasan & The Bombay Project
- "Mumbai Stamp" with Taufiq Qureshi
- "Sitar Funk" with Niladri Kumar
- Lesle Lewis
- Amit Trivedi
