= Six Suspects =

2016 novel by Indian diplomat Vikas Swarup

- First edition (US)
- Author: Vikas Swarup
- Cover artist: David Baldeosingh Rotstein
- Language: English
- Genre: Novel
- Publisher: St. Martin's Press (US); Doubleday (UK)
- Publication place: India
- Pages: 480
- ISBN: 978-0-312-63073-7

Six Suspects is the second novel by Vikas Swarup It was published by Transworld in 2016 and in the US by Minotaur Books and has been optioned for a film by Starfield Productions and BBC.

== Plot ==
Seven years ago, Vivek "Vicky" Rai, the playboy son of the Home Minister of Uttar Pradesh, murdered bartender Ruby Gill at a trendy restaurant in New Delhi, simply because she refused to serve him a drink. The opening murder committed by Vicky Rai is similar to the Jessica Lal murder case in which the killer was Manu Sharma.

Now Vicky Rai has been killed at the party he was throwing to celebrate his acquittal. The police recover six guests with guns in their possession: a corrupt bureaucrat who claims to have become Mahatma Gandhi; an American tourist infatuated with an Indian actress; a member of an ancient tribe on a quest to recover a sacred stone; a Bollywood sex symbol with a guilty secret; a mobile-phone thief who dreams big; and an ambitious politician prepared to stoop low.

Swarup unravels the lives and motives of the six suspects.

== Adaptation ==
Six Suspects has been adapted into a web series directed by Tigmanshu Dhulia called The Great Indian Murder. It features Richa Chaddha and Pratik Gandhi in lead roles. It was released on Disney+ Hotstar on 4 February 2022.
