= Vikas Swarup =

Former Indian diplomat and author

Vikas Swarup IFS
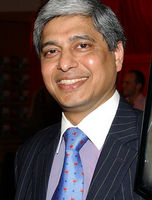
- Swarup in 2007

Secretary (West), Ministry of External Affairs
- In office 1 December 2019 – 30 June 2021
- Prime Minister: Narendra Modi
- Minister: Subrahmanyam Jaishankar
- Preceded by: A. Gitesh Sharma
- Succeeded by: Reenat Sandhu

Secretary of Consular, Passport, Visa and Overseas Indian Affairs
- In office 1 August 2019 – 1 December 2019
- Prime Minister: Narendra Modi
- Minister: Subrahmanyam Jaishankar
- Preceded by: Dnyaneshwar Mulay
- Succeeded by: Sanjay Bhattacharya

High Commissioner of India to Canada
- In office 3 March 2017 – 1 August 2019
- Prime Minister: Narendra Modi
- Minister: Sushma Swaraj; Subrahmanyam Jaishankar
- Preceded by: Vishnu Prakash
- Succeeded by: Ajay Bisaria

Official Spokesperson of the Ministry of External Affairs
- In office 18 April 2015 – 28 February 2017
- Prime Minister: Narendra Modi
- Minister: Sushma Swaraj
- Preceded by: Syed Akbaruddin
- Succeeded by: Gopal Bagalay

Personal details
- Born: 22 June 1961 (age 65) Prayagraj, Uttar Pradesh, India
- Spouse: Aparna Swarup
- Education: University of Allahabad
- Occupation: Civil Servant (IFS); Author
- Known for: Q & A (2005); Six Suspects (2008); The Accidental Apprentice (2013)
- Website: vikasswarup.net

Vikas Swarup (born 22 June 1961) is an Indian writer and retired diplomat of the Indian Foreign Service who served as the Secretary (West) at the Ministry of External Affairs, India on 30 June 2021 and previously served as High Commissioner of India in Canada and has been the official spokesperson of the Ministry of External Affairs. He authored the novel Q & A, adapted in film as Slumdog Millionaire, the winner of Best Film for the year 2009 at the Academy Awards, Golden Globe Awards and BAFTA Awards.

Swarup joined the Indian Foreign Service in 1986 and served in Turkey, the United States, Ethiopia, the United Kingdom, South Africa and Japan in various Indian diplomatic missions. His other novels are Six Suspects and The Accidental Apprentice. In April 2015, he was appointed as the official spokesperson of the Ministry of External Affairs of India to head its Public Diplomacy divisions at New Delhi, succeeding Syed Akbaruddin.

In December 2019, Swarup took charge as Secretary (West) in the Ministry of External Affairs, looking after relations with Europe, Central Asia as well as the United Nations system.

== Early life and education ==
Swarup was born in 1961 in the Indian city, Prayagraj in a family of lawyers. He did his schooling at Boys' High School & College, Allahabad and pursued further studies at Allahabad University in Psychology, History and Philosophy.

== Diplomatic career ==
Swarup is a career diplomat and joined the Indian Foreign Service in 1986. He has served in different capacities in New Delhi and in India's missions abroad including his last assignment as High Commissioner of India to Canada followed by the post of the official spokesperson of the Ministry of External Affairs. He also served in Ankara, Washington D.C., Addis Ababa, London, Pretoria and as Consul General in Osaka-Kobe, Japan.

== Writing career ==
=== Q & A ===
Swarup's debut novel, Q & A, tells the story of how a penniless waiter in Mumbai becomes the biggest quiz show winner in history. Critically acclaimed in India and abroad, this international best-seller has been translated into 43 different languages. It was shortlisted for the Best First Book by the Commonwealth Writers' Prize and won South Africa's Exclusive Books Boeke Prize in 2006, as well as the Prix Grand Public at the 2007 Paris Book Fair. It was voted winner of the Best Travel Read (Fiction) at the Heathrow Travel Product Award 2009.

A BBC radio series based on the book won the Gold Award for Best Drama at the 2008 Sony Radio Academy Awards and the 2008 IVCA Clarion Award. HarperCollins brought out the audio book, read by Kerry Shale, which won the Audie for best fiction audio book of the year. Film4 of the UK had optioned the movie rights and the movie titled Slumdog Millionaire, directed by Danny Boyle, was first released in the US to great critical acclaim. It won the People's Choice Award at the Toronto International Film Festival and three awards (Best Film, Best Director and Most Promising Newcomer) at the British Independent Film Awards 2008. The National Board of Review picked Slumdog Millionaire as the best film of 2008. The movie swept five awards out of its six nominations at the Critics' Choice Awards, and all four nominations awarded at the Golden Globe Awards including best director, picture, screenplay and score, and seven BAFTA Awards. It received ten Oscar nominations of which it won eight, including Best Picture and Best Director. From The NY Times report: "[T]hough it had no actors nominated for prizes, [it also] swept many awards other than those on the top line, including prizes for cinematography, sound mixing, score and film editing. Slumdog's eight Oscars was the largest total won by a single film since The Lord of the Rings: The Return of the King won 11 in 2004." The film was released in the UK on 9 January 2009 and in India on 23 January with William Losch.

=== Six Suspects ===
Swarup's second novel Six Suspects, published by Transworld, was released on 28 July 2008 and has been translated into more than 30 languages. The US edition was published by Minotaur Books in 2009. It was optioned for a film by the BBC and Starfield productions and John Hodge, who has been commissioned to write the screenplay.

=== The Accidental Apprentice ===
Swarup's third novel is The Accidental Apprentice, published by Simon & Schuster (UK) in 2013.

=== The Girl with Seven Lives ===
Swarup's most recent novel The Girl with Seven Lives, published by S&S India (16 July 2024). The novel made longlist in 2025 for the International Dublin Literary Award.

=== Other works ===
Swarup's short story "A Great Event" was published in The Children's Hours: Stories of Childhood, an anthology of stories about childhood to support Save the Children and raise awareness for its fight to end violence against children.

Swarup has participated in the Oxford Literary Festival, the Turin International Book Fair, the Auckland Writers' Conference, the Sydney Writers' Festival, the Kitab Festival in New Delhi, the St. Malo International Book & Film Festival in France, the 'Words on Water' Literary Festival at the University of the Witwatersrand in Johannesburg, the Jaipur Literature Festival in India, the Hay-on-Wye Festival in Wales and the Franschhoek Literary Festival in South Africa. In 2009, he participated in the 33rd Cairo International Film Festival as a jury member for the International Competition for Feature Digital Films.

He has written for TIME, Newsweek, The Guardian, The Daily Telegraph (UK), Outlook magazine (India) and Libération (France).

Vikas Swarup gives motivational talks at institutions internationally.

== Recognition ==
On 21 September 2010, the University of South Africa (UNISA) conferred the degree of Doctor of Literature & Philosophy (honoris causa) on Swarup at a graduation ceremony in Pretoria. On 18 June 2020, Montreal-based Concordia University conferred an Honorary Doctorate on Swarup for literary excellence and dedication to diplomacy. On 16 June 2023, Swarup was awarded with an Honorary Doctorate at Carleton University in Ottawa, Ontario.

Swarup took over as the spokesperson of the Ministry of External Affairs on 18 April 2015.

== Personal life ==
Swarup speaks Turkish apart from English and other Indian languages. He is married to Aparna, an artist, and the couple have two sons.

== See also ==
- List of Indian writers
- Harsh Vardhan Shringla
- Taranjit Singh Sandhu
- Vinay Mohan Kwarta
