= Get Johnny Week =

EastEnders storyline from 2006

Johnny and Danny plan their revenge on the Mitchells

"Get Johnny Week" is a week-long storyline in the BBC soap opera EastEnders, which was first screened at the end of March 2006. The storyline refers to the character of Johnny Allen (Billy Murray), the show's main antagonist, and also features the characters of his daughter Ruby Allen (Louisa Lytton); enemies Grant (Ross Kemp) and Phil Mitchell (Steve McFadden); and former henchmen Jake (Joel Beckett) and Danny Moon (Jake Maskall).

== Storyline development ==
"Get Johnny Week" is an EastEnders storyline that reunited the popular characters Phil and Grant Mitchell (a.k.a. the Mitchell brothers) in 2006. Actor Ross Kemp, who played Grant continuously from 1990 to 1999, was persuaded to return to EastEnders for a three-month period in the spring of 2006 and "Get Johnny Week" was the storyline that marked his return.

The storyline saw the Mitchell brothers embroiled in a revenge bid against their gangland enemy Johnny Allen. It was dubbed "Get Johnny Week" by the programme makers, and the storyline was featured heavily in a BBC advertising campaign before and during the airing of the storyline.

The beginning of the storyline saw a stark personality change in the character of Grant. Typically the more volatile and aggressive of the two brothers, in his absence from the show Grant had become a more diplomatic "peacemaker"; traits that were previously seen more commonly in the character Phil. Actor Ross Kemp has commented on his character's personality change: "Grant tells Phil that, while he was in Brazil, he had therapy, so he becomes an amateur psychiatrist for a couple of episodes. Then, he reverts to his true form of thumping everyone!...Grant's like Phil and Phil's like Grant this week. Grant becomes the more careful and meticulous one, while Phil's the hot-headed brother for a change."

Grant's personality change prompted criticism, with one reviewer branding the character's "new touchy feely attitude to life" as "implausible". Another commented "This new unimproved family-friendly "come on give me a hug" Grant gives me the creeps. In just one crazed week the demented EastEnders scriptwriters undermined TV's top tough guy to such a profound extent that I can't see how he'll ever recover. With Phil and Grant reunited for the first time in six months, we were all looking forward to some classic Mitchell mayhem. In fact we had a right to expect carnage from the terrible twins. But what did we get? Grant's nauseating revelation that he underwent therapy to stop being so violent and antisocial."

As such, the storyline also saw the Moon Brothers Jake and Danny reunited. It is later revealed that Danny was the one who killed Dennis under Johnny's orders, shortly before Danny himself ends up getting killed by Jake before he could execute the Mitchell Brothers for Johnny as well. The Daily Mirror comments:

It's not long before Johnny's past catches up with him. Just before Dennis was killed, he gave Johnny a thrashing which left him unconscious – but handed him a lifeline by throwing him his mobile. Johnny was able to make a last call before falling unconscious – to Danny.

Danny is desperate to get back in with Johnny so when he is given the task he doesn't hesitate. But Johnny needs to be sure and so threatens Danny with death if he doesn't carry out the mission. He's not far away and minutes later he arrives to stab Dennis and slip away as the clock strikes midnight on New Year's Eve. Johnny recovers in hospital and has the perfect alibi for Dennis's murder so thinks he's in the clear – and decides to make a fresh start elsewhere with Ruby. But Phil is furious his attempts to get at Johnny led to Dennis's death, and is guilt-ridden for what it has done to his friend Sharon. With Grant in tow, he sets out to finish Allen once and for all – but somehow his enemy knows he's coming and is prepared.

== Plot ==
The story begins with Phil Mitchell (Steve McFadden), the local hardman of Walford – a fictional borough in East London – and its community Albert Square, waking up from a nightmare in which he has blood on his hands. This causes Phil to realize that he is seeing images of his former love rival, Dennis Rickman (Nigel Harman), being murdered on New Years Eve 2005. The dream ends with Phil finding himself face-to-face with Johnny Allen (Billy Murray), the square's criminal kingpin who appears to taunt Phil by laughing towards him. Later on that morning, Phil seemingly wishes to spend time with his brother Grant Mitchell (Ross Kemp) by arranging for them to go and play a round of golf. Grant agrees and the brothers set off to play golf, but stop at a roadside café in Essex. There, the two discuss their own personal problems – namely Phil's struggle to avoid a relapse in his alcoholism – over lunch. A strange man walks into the café and makes a sarcastic joke about Phil and Grant's bald heads, remarking: "Right Said Fred have reformed." The stranger follows Phil into the toilets and starts singing "I'm Too Sexy". Phil reacts by punching the stranger and knocking him out. When they leave the café, Grant tells Phil that he has been seeing a therapist in a bid to confront his demons. They pass a large house in the countryside and Phil orders Grant to stop. Phil announces that he is ready to confront his demons and that they have arrived at Johnny's house.

Phil scours Johnny's house in a bid to break in, while Grant begs him to stop being stupid. Phil explains that he is keeping the promise that he made with Dennis' wife Sharon (Letitia Dean) to confront Johnny for Dennis's murder, which Johnny had ordered. Johnny spots Phil on his CCTV system and quickly finds him. Phil attacks Johnny but Johnny manages to overpower him with a stick. Grant soon arrives on the scene and finds Phil being threatened by Johnny and his henchman, Danny Moon (Jake Maskall). Grant beats up Danny, while Johnny re-enters his office and starts arguing with his daughter Ruby Allen (Louisa Lytton) – who is angry with him for being an alcoholic. Phil finally intimidates Johnny into admitting his involvement in Dennis' death, and begins to throttle him.

Phil and Grant face execution at the hands of Johnny's henchman Danny

Phil's anger towards Johnny gets more intense and he threatens to shoot him, but Grant stops him from pulling the trigger just in time. Danny once again tries to defend Johnny but receives another beating from Phil and Grant, and stays at the house while Johnny flees in his car. Phil and Grant give chase to Johnny and follow him to a deserted goods yard, where Phil almost runs him over. Johnny escapes and then Grant and Phil get into an argument. Grant insults Phil for being a bad father and almost gets run over himself, but Phil smashes the car into a pile of skips instead. The skips collapse on Phil's car but he emerges unscathed. Johnny returns from where he had left the Mitchells and holds them at gunpoint.

Armed with a gun, Johnny frogmarches Phil and Grant to a soundproofed cell back at his house. Grant quickly establishes that Johnny is intent on killing them both, and his expectations are confirmed when Johnny orders Danny to lead them away into the nearby woods to kill them both and then bury their bodies. Phil hears a gunshot and opens his eyes to see Danny lying dead on the floor. Phil turns his head to see Danny's brother, Jake Moon (Joel Beckett), standing nearby with a gun – looking mortified; Jake had just killed Danny despite not wanting to do so. Jake is devastated at having killed his brother, as he only wanted to stop him from killing someone. After the Mitchells leave, Jake buries Danny's body in the woods. Meanwhile, Ruby discovers mobile phone footage of Dennis' murder. She announces that she has informed the police about Johnny's crimes and that they are on their way to the house. Johnny is arrested and immediately confesses to the police that he murdered his gangland predecessor, Andy Hunter (Michael Higgs), and later ordered Danny to kill Dennis.

=== Aftermath ===
Johnny is eventually convicted of killing Andy and ordering the murder of Dennis. He receives a sentence of life imprisonment and the judge recommends that he should spend at least 27 years behind bars before being considered for release, but six months into his sentence, he suffers a heart attack in prison and dies in hospital the next day – after receiving a visit from Ruby's boyfriend, Sean Slater (Robert Kazinsky), and being taunted by the latter over his plan to extract their family assets.
