= Chrissie Watts =

Fictional British TV character

- EastEnders character
- Portrayed by: Tracy-Ann Oberman
- Duration: 2004–2005, 2024–2026
- First appearance: Episode 2720; 29 April 2004
- Last appearance: Episode 7280; 17 February 2026
- Introduced by: Louise Berridge (2004); Chris Clenshaw (2024); Ben Wadey (2025)
In-universe information
- Other names: Christine Watts
- Occupation: Businesswoman; Barmaid; Pub landlady; Hairdresser
- Family: Watts
- Brothers: Neil
- Husband: Steve (backstory); Den Watts (until 2005)
- Stepsons: Dennis Rickman
- Stepdaughters: Vicki Fowler; Sharon Watts (adoptive)

Chrissie Watts is a fictional character from the BBC soap opera EastEnders, played by Tracy-Ann Oberman. She first appeared on 29 April 2004 and transpired to be the second wife of the show's "most enduring character", Den Watts (Leslie Grantham) – and thus became a prominent regular for the next 18 months. In 2005, Chrissie was the focus of one of "the programme's biggest and most high-profile narratives" when she killed her husband in self-defence at the end of the special 20th anniversary episode. The broadcast, airing on 18 February, was watched by 14.34 million people – with "almost 60% of possible viewers" tuning in to see Chrissie killing Den. The character was credited by former head of BBC Drama Serials Mal Young as "anchoring the success of the anniversary storyline", and was described on the news programme BBC Breakfast as the "centrepiece" of the show, with the on-screen drama playing out over the course of 2005 and culminating in Chrissie's departure on 9 December 2005. On 3 July 2024, it was announced that Oberman would be reprising the role later in the year for a short stint. Chrissie's return aired on 5 September 2024 in prison, and she departed the show on 12 September, following her reunion with Jake Moon (Joel Beckett) and release after serving nearly 19 years for the murder of Den. On 24 December 2025, Oberman made an unannounced return, which saw her revealed as Zoe Slater's (Michelle Ryan) stalker; she departed the show on 17 February of the following year.

Chrissie Watts was created by the production team to be more the "equal" of her notorious and villainous husband than his long-suffering first wife, Angie Watts (Anita Dobson). The character was described by Oberman as being like Angie "but with 15 more years of feminism behind her", and was hailed by the TV editor of the Evening Standard as "the only strong woman left in Walford". She became well known for her deviousness and "scheming", echoing the traits of her husband, with the official EastEnders website characterising her as "happy to play mind games" and "often two steps ahead" of Den. As part of the Watts family and the last of its major members to have appeared on the show, Chrissie's storylines explored her tumultuous marriage to Den; bonding with his adopted daughter Sharon (Letitia Dean) and her two adoptive siblings, Dennis Rickman (Nigel Harman) and Vicki Fowler (Scarlett Alice Johnson); conspiring with Den to retake ownership of The Queen Victoria public house; forming a relationship with Jake following Den's murder; attempting to sell the Queen Vic to Jake's gangland boss Johnny Allen (Billy Murray) and local businessman Ian Beale (Adam Woodyatt); being blackmailed by young wayward Stacey Slater (Lacey Turner); and feuding with the rival Mitchell family. During her time on the show, Chrissie sparked numerous clashes with other female characters – such as her archenemy Sam Mitchell (Kim Medcalf); Stacey's cousin Kat (Jessie Wallace); Phil's girlfriend Kate Morton (Jill Halfpenny); Kat's daughter Zoe; and Sam's mother Peggy (Barbara Windsor). It was noted by Oberman herself that Chrissie "had more fights on EastEnders than most women have in their whole lives", and was constantly scheming against those who got in her way, thereby earning her the sobriquet of "super-bitch".

Oberman won praise for her "three-dimensional portrayal of a classic soap bitch", with Chrissie hailed as "helping revive the show's fortunes that had been lagging somewhat in recent years". According to the Daily Mirror reporter Elizabeth Hassell, the character became a "national TV heroine" to viewers shortly after arriving, for standing up to the antics of her dastardly husband, and is most often cited as a "strong" and "clever" woman, as well as being "hard as nails" in "the grand tradition of landladies of The Queen Vic". Although generally well received by viewers, the character was described as a "ludicrous Lady Macbeth wannabe" by Jim Shelley of the Daily Mirror. Other critics have variously called Chrissie a "witch", "venomous", and the show's resident "black widow".

== Creation and casting ==
The creation of a second wife for Den Watts (Leslie Grantham), the show's "most enduring character" and "one of the best-loved villains in soap history", came 15 years after his first wife had departed the screen. Angie Watts (Anita Dobson) was an iconic character in British television history, with her troublesome marriage to Den largely anchoring EastEnders' extraordinary success when it was launched in the mid-80s. In an interview shortly after she first appeared on-screen as Chrissie Watts, Tracy-Ann Oberman noted how coming into the show after Angie was an intimidating prospect and "a big act to follow".

Casting for the character was hectic, with Oberman describing the process as a "whirlwind" affair. The role of the second Mrs Den Watts was highly sought after, with Oberman eventually beating out high-profile stars such as Patsy Kensit, Cheryl Baker and Joanna Lumley for the part. In a 2004 'Star Chat' interview featured in The People, Oberman commented on her casting: "I couldn't have wished for a better part. I mean the Watts family are a national institution. When I realised I was auditioning for the role of Dirty Den's wife, my jaw just dropped. I never thought I'd get it. Amazing, swanky actresses, like Joanna Lumley and Patsy Kensit, were all considered, but Leslie Grantham and I had great chemistry from the off and I think he said: 'I want her.'" Oberman was on holiday when she received a call saying she had been cast in the role and was required to be on set the next Tuesday. All told, the audition process had taken just two weeks, with Oberman beginning filming a mere ten days after her initial screen test. In fact, the schedule was so tight that Oberman was on set and taping scenes before a contract had even been signed.

"I think there is a good chemistry between me and Leslie on-screen."

— Tracy Ann Oberman

The arrival of Chrissie Watts was announced barely a month before she was set to first appear on-screen and came at a time when EastEnders was undergoing immense media criticism and falling ratings. The rush of casting meant Oberman had little time to process the enormity of the part she had taken on, declaring: "my feet haven't even touched the ground yet. [...] I haven't had time to think about what this role is going to do to my life! I'm very excited to be part of such a fantastic show and one I have been a fan of for many years." She admitted, however, to being "slightly intimidated" by the high media profile and press interest surrounding the show at the time. Indeed, joining EastEnders "proved to be something of a baptism of fire for Oberman", as she was playing opposite Leslie Grantham, whose recent return to the show had been a highly publicised event. Twenty-four hours after Chrissie's first episode went to air, a scandal surrounding Grantham hit the tabloid papers. According to Oberman, the atmosphere on set the next day "was a bit tense" but, she added, "the Watts are pulling together and we're getting on with it and working". Looking back on the incident after she had left EastEnders, Oberman remarked, "I respect Leslie for fronting it out; he emerged from his dressing room and started working. No one mentioned the story. That's life in EastEnders; the machine never stops."

The increasing prominence of Chrissie in EastEnders meant that Oberman, more than most, had to endure the gruelling schedule of working on a soap, taping up to twenty scenes a day. Although she was only in EastEnders for 18 months, such was the centrality of Chrissie to the show and storylines that Oberman felt she had done four years worth of acting, noting that by the time of her departure, "Chrissie has packed into a year what most soap characters do in three." This all came during a period of great uncertainty for the show; media criticism and negative publicity created immense pressure behind the scenes, with large-scale cast culls and speculation in the press and on the set over who may be next. In an interview with the Sunday Mirror, Oberman described the atmosphere as like a "vacuum", with the cast "just waiting to see what the next stage is – It can be a bit tense but it's exciting. I really don't know what's going to happen." However, the prominent role of Chrissie in the show as it moved forward meant that Oberman came out of the uncertainty with more to show than most, receiving an improved deal and extending her contract for a year, with the BBC's head of drama, John Yorke, declaring he had "big plans" for Chrissie.

== Development ==
=== Personality ===
"You have to understand why she is the way she is. Otherwise, you're playing a cartoon character. Behind every bitch, there's someone who was really hurt somewhere in her life."

— Tracy Ann Oberman

Unlike Den's first wife, Angie, Chrissie "has a strong will and fights for what she wants". However, as Oberman noted, "there is enough of Angie in Chrissie to see that Den likes a certain type of strong woman. Chrissie is Angie with 15 years of feminism behind her", explaining in an interview with Radio 4: "I like to think of Chrissie as Angie with benefits... She's his [Den's] equal a bit more than Angie was." Oberman later expanded: "Chrissie, unlike Angie, won't hit the bottle as soon as Den starts playing away. She's proved she's ready to sit and wait for her revenge. She's a great, strong character". Talking to the Daily Mirror shortly after appearing on-screen for the first time in April, Oberman declared, "Chrissie is the sort of woman I'd really like to be friends with... She's an Essex girl who was brought up in a family of brothers, so she knows how to work men. She understands that what they say is not always what they mean." In her official character profile, Chrissie is portrayed as someone "happy to play mind games" and "often two steps ahead of her husband", being described as "the type of person to be your best friend. But if you cross her, she'll get her own back in the end." Her strong-willed persona has led reviewers to label the character as "venomous", "devious", and "hard as nails" in "the grand tradition of landladies of the Queen Vic", manipulating others to ensure matters go her way. As the "scheming" figure of the show, she was described as a "witch" and "super-bitch", but was also represented as a "strong" and "clever" woman. Executive producer Kate Harwood characterised Chrissie as a survivor, someone who "thinks on her feet" whatever the situation. Oberman has stated that she was thrilled to be "playing such a strong female character", whom she described as not a bad person at heart but one willing to stand and "fight in her corner".

Chrissie's style was a prominent aspect of the character. Tracy-Ann Oberman wanted to bring an element of Sex and the City to the character.

An aspect of Chrissie's personality is her wardrobe and style, with EastEnders costume designer Di Humphreys noting that "Chrissie's clothes reflect her strong, upfront character." Oberman explained how the character's fashion sense was informed by her own observations of British expatriates: "When I heard I had the part of Chrissie I was on holiday in Spain, where she had been living, and I remember looking at all the ex-pat women, and thinking how co-ordinated they are. Their hair is always perfect, their bags match their gloves and shoes and scarves." The show's make-up artist, Elizabeth Armistead, has also spoken of the way Chrissie's "glamorous, polished look" informs her characterisation and personality: "Chrissie's a confident person who rarely leaves anything to chance. Even in moments of despair, though her facial expression reflects her turmoil, she never has a hair out of place." The look was part of a desire to represent the character as a "strong" and "forceful" figure, with one interviewer describing Chrissie as "quite flashy" and "glam". According to Humphreys, this is manifested in "Chrissie's outfits, [which] are a mixture of designer and High Street... Chrissie's got a great sense of style. She makes High Street clothes look made to measure." Oberman felt Chrissie's fashion sensibilities to be a critical element of the character: "she's like Angie with 15 more years of Sex and the City thrown in", referring to an American television serial notable for its fashion. Even before stepping foot on set, Oberman spent eight hours with Humphreys shopping for Chrissie's clothes at Selfridges where they "spent a fortune!" The character's highly stylised representation on-screen earned Oberman the award for best-dressed soap star in 2005, and reflected Chrissie's new-found role as the "voluptuous landlady" of The Queen Vic. In the media the character was widely regarded as the show's ultimate femme fatale and resident "sex symbol", being described by John Dingwall of the Daily Record as Walford's "black widow".

In an interview with the Sunday Mirror, Oberman revealed that she was attracted to the mesh of sexuality and humour in the personality of Chrissie, declaring, "What I really like is she's got the sex and dry sarcasm". Speaking to the official EastEnders website, she expanded on the importance of Chrissie's sense of humour and wit to her "feisty" characterisation: "What I love about Chrissie is that she's a good strong, funny female character... she's got a really good sense of humour which is necessary to deal with Den. She's very good at wisecracks. Den has the one-liners, but Chrissie bats them right back." Chrissie's barbed and biting remarks became a prominent feature of the character; even when cornered by Den's adopted daughter Sharon Watts (Letitia Dean) after attempting to flee the country, she remarks: "You really are your father's daughter, Sharon. No shaking you off either."

=== Mrs Den Watts ===
Chrissie entered the show as the estranged wife of Den Watts, and was deliberately presented as "very different to the first Mrs. Watts." When EastEnders began in 1985 viewers had watched Den's affairs and manipulation gradually take their toll on his wife, Angie, who was unable to compete in the games he played. Chrissie was intended to be a contrast to her predecessor; where Angie turned to alcohol, Chrissie was more Den's "equal" and could be just as devious and calculating, with Oberman observing how "Angie was all knee-jerk reaction, but Chrissie is more of a plotter and schemer – just like Den." Comparing Den's two wives, Oberman remarked: "Chrissie's much cooler than Angie. Her motto is, 'revenge is a dish best served cold'. She's tougher than Angie and she can hold it together much better." Indeed, according to Oberman, producers deliberately wanted to take Den's second marriage down a different path to his first; whereas the relationship between Den and Angie had been likened to Richard Burton and Elizabeth Taylor, that between Den and Chrissie was modelled on Spencer Tracy and Katharine Hepburn. Like Den, Chrissie had an acerbic tongue and their relationship was marked by verbal fencing in the manner of Hepburn and Tracy: "What's great is that they've written Den an equal", Oberman noted, "It'll be interesting to see their little sparring matches." The attraction was intended to be mutual, unlike Den's one-sided marriage to Angie. Trying to win Chrissie around into giving their marriage another try, Den declared: "I know we've got a great relationship even when we're tearing lumps out of each other, you give as good as you get and that's the sort of marriage I've always wanted". Commenting on the complicated nature of their relationship, Oberman observed,

I think for Chrissie, who was brought up in a family of all men, she understands male psychology very well. She knows how to play men and I think Den is the only man she has ever met that she can't actually pin down... there's a constant game of who will be the victor because they are very much equals.

The equality of their marriage was dramatically underscored towards the end of 2004, when Den, as a sign of faith and in an effort to win back her sympathies, revealed to Chrissie his plans to reclaim The Queen Victoria public house by scamming the rival Mitchell family: "If you ever needed proof that we're in this together or how badly I need you in my life, this is it. I wasn't going to show this to another soul, but I'm showing you because you're my wife; because it's me and you together."

In an interview with the official EastEnders website, Oberman detailed the background dynamic to Chrissie and Den's relationship as it existed before their appearance on the show: "They were a real match for each other and ran a successful wine bar. The couple made a good team, but he was always going off with other women. She'd end up leaving him, but they'd always end up back together." Den's womanising and philandering nature was deliberately set against Chrissie's strong and forceful personality, and culminated on-screen in his affair with Kate Mitchell (Jill Halfpenny). The plot was praised by television editor Ru Green as being one of the "better storylines" during an otherwise weak year for the show, with media attention at the time profiling Chrissie's dramatic plans for revenge. The climax, which saw Chrissie cut off Kate Mitchell's hair in retribution for the affair, was a highlight for Oberman and an important dramatic milestone for her character: "cutting off Jill Halfpenny's hair in the salon... was a really great episode. I loved working with Jill and I think that put Chrissie on the map."

Chrissie left Den but was eventually convinced to give their marriage another try. She also saw the ebb and flow of Den and Chrissie's marriage as a reflection of the mental gameplaying that was so prominent in their characterisations: "I think there's a challenge in it, and I think she would like to be the one who would ultimately tame him." As Den's equal, Chrissie was intended to be a challenge to his propensity for intellectual games, having already outwitted the show's prior top dog, Phil Mitchell (Steve McFadden). Den had seen little threat in his first wife's aptitude, but considered Chrissie to be "as sharp as they come". Indeed, Den's extra-marital dalliances were used by writers to showcase and highlight Chrissie's "strong-willed persona". When Zoe Slater (Michelle Ryan) chastised Den for caring only about Chrissie's reaction should she learn of their affair, Den fired back: "And so should you. You think I've treated you badly? Well you don't have a clue what's going to happen if she ever finds out! The best thing you can do is keep your mouth shut."

=== Witches of Walford ===
In November 2004 it was announced that Leslie Grantham had not renewed his contract and that Den Watts would depart EastEnders in what was described by The Mirror as an "explosive" and final exit. The storyline became one of "the program's biggest and most high-profile narratives", dominating the entire year, and made the character of Chrissie Watts the "centrepiece" of the show. The lead-up to the 20th anniversary episode in February was an immensely high-profile affair, with Imogen Ridgway and Richard Godwin of the Evening Standard dryly observing that "unless you've been living on Titan you probably know that EastEnders is 20 years old and Dirty Den is once again leaving Albert Square." Events in the show centre around Chrissie manipulating Sam Mitchell and Zoe Slater in a plot of revenge against Den, the three women being dubbed the "Witches of Walford" by the popular press in reference to Shakespeare's play, Macbeth. The prelude to Den's death further highlighted and showcased Chrissie's manipulative character and conniving personality in her representation as a "strong" and "forceful" figure. When she secretly learns that Zoe is pregnant by Den, she plays on Zoe's insecurities and vulnerabilities and "coerces" her into having an abortion. The pregnancy represented a double blow to Chrissie as Den had always resisted having children with her, and as with Kate Mitchell, Chrissie determines to teach Zoe a harsh lesson about "messing with other people's husbands". The possessive nature of his wife was noted by Den, who warns Zoe that Chrissie "tends to blame the women that lead me astray."

"You'd be so proud of me darling. Do you know that? I'm really sorting those girls out. I'm not leaving anything to chance. I'm starting to enjoy it. And do you know what the irony is: the only person who could appreciate how well I'm doing is you."

— Chrissie Watts confiding to the grave of her husband, Den.

The final confrontation between husband and wife played out during the special episode marking the show's 20th anniversary. Such was public interest in the storyline that the production team reportedly took to "fiercely guarding" scripts, "so that even the cast weren't sure how they would play out", with "the show's producers shooting multiple endings to ensure the cast couldn't leak the plot." During the hour-long broadcast Chrissie leads Sam and Zoe into facing Den, with 14.34 million people watching her deliver the fatal blow to her husband after a violent struggle. Oberman "begged the producers to let Chrissie do it to prove she wasn't a sap", adding "It was a real rush for me."

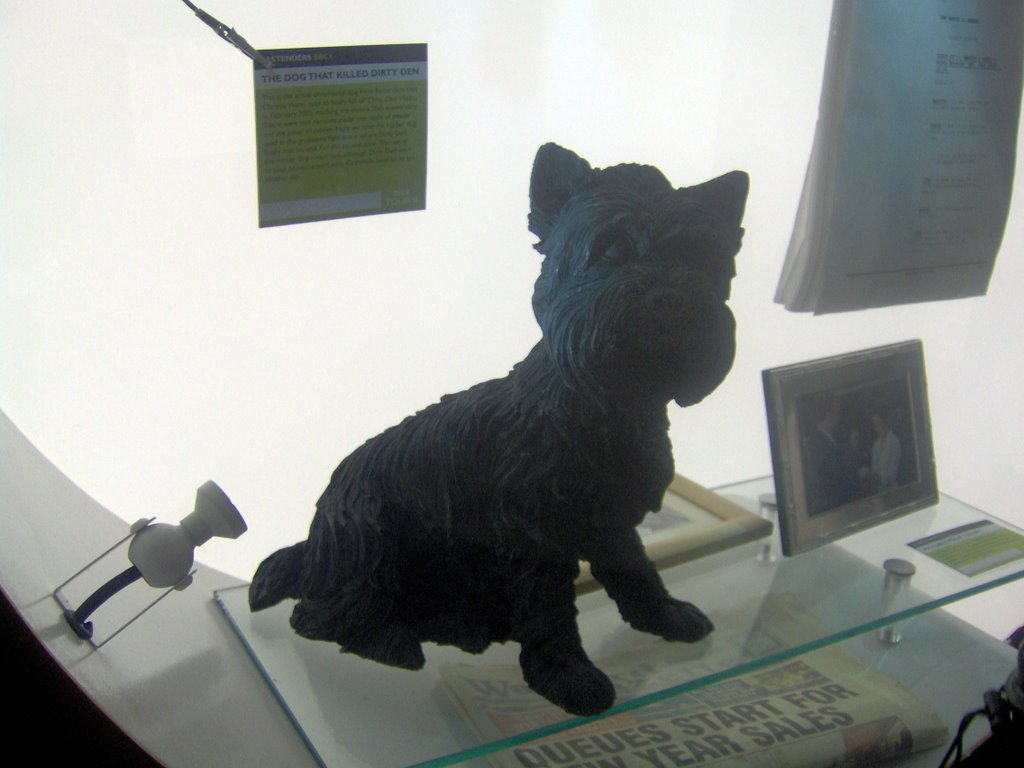
The doggy doorstop prop from the British soap opera EastEnders that was owned by the character Pauline Fowler and was used by Chrissie to kill her husband Den Watts

In the aftermath of Den's death, Chrissie became an increasingly "transformed" and colder figure, as the character "played" and "spun" her way "out of every situation". She proceeds to trick Zoe into taking the blame for Den's murder, and continuously outmanoeuvres Sam in the latter's efforts to get back the Vic. Oberman felt this to be a noticeable shift in Chrissie's characterisation, with the show's writers taking "her down a darker route", as in one notable scene depicting Chrissie standing over Den's grave, and confiding to him of her plans.

The storyline commenced its conclusion with the return of the Mitchell family to help Sam, who had been framed by Chrissie for the murder of Den; events were to culminate in Chrissie's departure from the show, with producers telling Oberman that when she leaves "later this year, it's going to be one of the most explosive storylines ever. Like Den before her, Chrissie had little trouble outsmarting the Mitchells, her clashes with Peggy (Barbara Windsor), Phil, and Grant (Ross Kemp) part of the final showdown between the Watts and Mitchells that, in the words of one presenter, "grips the nation". The story's climax, resulting in Chrissie's exit from Walford, was such a considerable moment for the show that BBC bosses took the highly unusual step of keeping the "manner of her departure" a "complete mystery even to the soap's [own] producers", with reports claiming that "no less than four separate storylines [are] to be filmed for her departure from EastEnders". Commenting at the time to NOW, Oberman said, "I think Chrissie deserves to get away with murder. She was heavily provoked. I'd love to see her make it to Argentina... [and] run a beach bar with a young Latin lover by her side." The immense public focus on the figure of Chrissie was used by executives in the intensifying ratings war, with the BBC "using the Chrissie Watts departure as the major weapon in our armoury... to snatch back viewers" from rival soaps.

=== "Victim or Villain?" ===
To mark Chrissie's departure from the show, BBC Three aired a special episode of EastEnders Revealed on 22 September 2005. Entitled "Chrissie Watts: Victim or Villain?", the episode featured comments from Oberman, Grantham (Den), Dean (Sharon), Medcalf (Sam), Beckett (Jake), and Windsor (Peggy) profiling Chrissie and exploring the nuanced nature of the character. "A lot of viewers, and myself," Oberman later remarked, "really wanted Chrissie to get away with it, especially as Den was such a monster. But soap and film noir have a lot in common – the bad girls have to be punished." However, critics considered Chrissie to be a "three-dimensional soap bitch", rather than a flat pantomime figure. Despite having killed her father, Chrissie highly valued her friendship with Sharon, declaring at one point: "my friendship with you is the only good thing to come out of my relationship with Den, and I mean that!" Oberman characterised Chrissie as "part victim part villain", declaring "I think of her as a villain with a heart". She felt that, although "no excuse" for murder, Chrissie was driven to what she did: "She's not a cold blooded murderer, it was all done in a fit of pique", and that "these characters are made, not born." Chrissie was haunted by the alcoholic fate of Den's first wife, which she vowed at Angie's grave to avoid. However, in spite of her efforts, and indeed because of them, she failed, as she came to recognise: "You know it's funny; when Den used to talk about Ange he used to describe her as this weak sad, cow. And I used to think 'not like me, oh no, not like me'. Who's having the last laugh now, Ange?"

=== Returns (2024–2026) ===
In July 2024, it was announced that Oberman would be reprising the role later in the year, after 19 years away. Oberman told the BBC "Chrissie Watts was such a great character to play – a victim or a villain," she said. She is a real fan favourite so, when [executive producer] Chris Clenshaw asked me to come back and revisit her and see what has happened in the last 19 years, I jumped at the chance".

Oberman returned to the role again when Chrissie appeared during the final moments of the 24 December 2025 episode, when it was revealed she was the one revealed to be stalking Zoe Slater (Ryan), with the assistance of Zoe's long-lost daughter, Jasmine Fisher (Indeyarna Donaldson-Holness). Speaking on her return, Oberman told BBC that the decision was made between her and producer Ben Wadey to keep her return tight-lipped, revealing: "Ben and I were keen to keep Chrissie's return a complete secret, so I'm delighted my return was kept under wraps." She further cited her belief that Chrissie felt it was "very unfair" to have spent 20 years in prison as a reason for seeking revenge against Zoe. In February 2026, Oberman announced her exit from the role. She departed during the 17 February episode.

== Storylines ==
=== 2004–2005 ===
Chrissie arrives in Albert Square in search of her estranged husband, Den Watts (Leslie Grantham). Den persuades her to give their marriage another try and to stay in Walford with him. Chrissie reluctantly agrees and is surprised to learn that he has an adopted daughter, Sharon (Letitia Dean), along with two other children: Dennis Rickman (Nigel Harman) and Vicki Fowler (Scarlett Alice Johnson). As Chrissie settles herself in the square and recoups her marriage with Den, she bonds with his children and befriends a local ex-policewoman, Kate Morton (Jill Halfpenny), and the two work together as hairdressers. However, this does not last when Chrissie discovers that Den has been having sex with Kate. She exacts revenge on Kate by offering to give her a haircut, only to end up hacking most of her hair. She then proceeds to smash up the beauty salon in a rage and starts a fight with Kate that Den breaks up moments later; Chrissie promptly slaps Den and confronts him. She informs Kate's boyfriend Ian Beale (Adam Woodyatt) and departs Walford, distraught and hurt at Den's betrayal, but then returns due to being the co-owner of Kate's salon.

When Den tells her about his plan to bankrupt local businesswoman Sam Mitchell (Kim Medcalf) and her family from their ownership of The Queen Victoria public house, she agrees to help, but then tells Den that she will kill him if he ever cheats on her again; Den seemingly accepts her word. Together, the couple successfully defraud Sam from everything her family owns. Den then proceeds to move Chrissie and his children into the pub after evicting its manager Alfie Moon (Shane Richie) and his family. Chrissie begins to feel left out by Den as he constantly ignores her and he begins having sex with Zoe Slater (Michelle Ryan) to get her pregnant for a potential baby with Dennis. Dennis discovers this after catching her and Den in bed. He tells Chrissie about Den and Zoe. Chrissie plans to get revenge and persuades Zoe to abort the baby. Afterwards, Chrissie confronts Zoe and seemingly accepts Zoe's explanation with what Den put her through and the two plan to exact revenge on him for good, with Sam agreeing to help out as well. They agree that the plan will result in either Chrissie or Sam getting hold of the pub, with disagreements over who would get it.

Chrissie kneeling over Den's corpse during the 20th anniversary episode. Consolidated figures reveal the episode was seen by over 17 million viewers (nearly 1/3 of the British population).

On the night of Den and Angie's 37th wedding anniversary, Chrissie executes her plan with Sam and Zoe, though not before the couple find a metaled dog-shaped doorstop owned by Pauline Fowler (Wendy Richard), a sworn enemy of Den's since 1985. The couple briefly talk about keeping it as Chrissie initially begins to romance with Den. Once Chrissie lets Sam and Zoe in just as Den turns to face her, they stare menacingly towards him and confront him. Although Chrissie demands Den to give her power of attorney with The Queen Vic and goes on to admit that she helped Zoe abort his child, Den is unmoved and begins to enumerate the full extent of his crimes. He taunts Chrissie and reveals Chrissie's part in scamming Sam and her family, which causes a rift. Chrissie reveals that Sharon is hiding in the shadows and has heard him talk about all of his wrongdoings. Sharon denounces Den and leaves Walford, after which Chrissie taunts him. Den attacks her and strikes her head against the pub's fruit machine. Just as he prepares to do it again, Chrissie is saved by Zoe when she picks up Pauline's doorstop and hits Den on the head with it. Den collapses onto the ground just as Chrissie recuperates, and it becomes apparent that he is dead when Sam finds herself unable to find a pulse. A smug Chrissie starts to gloat that Den is dead when he grabs her leg and reprimands her. Chrissie then picks up the doorstop and delivers a fatal blow to his head, secretly watched by Sam. The three women bury him in a hole in the pub's cellar, which is filled with cement the next morning.

Despite knowing that Zoe is innocent, Chrissie allows her to believe that she killed Den. This continues even when Sam confronts Chrissie that she saw her, and not Zoe, being the one to have killed Den. Sam demands Chrissie reinstate the pub's ownership back to the Mitchells in exchange for her silence. Chrissie publicly accounts for Den's sudden absence by alleging that he has run off with another woman. She soon begins a relationship with Alfie's cousin Jake (Joel Beckett). Chrissie has Zoe leave Walford, after which Sam takes the doorstop that Chrissie used to kill Den and hides it in her flat. Sam then tells Zoe the truth and Zoe decides to leave, after telling Kat (Jessie Wallace) the truth about Den's murder. Following Zoe's departure, Kat confronts Chrissie with the knowledge that she killed Den and promises to bring her down should she disclose Zoe's involvement in any way. After Chrissie taunts Sam, Sam gets drunk and on the day Sharon and Dennis get married, Sam smashes up Den's grave and digs up his body in the hope that Chrissie will be sent down for his death. She ends up getting arrested after assaulting the pub's barmaid, Tracey (Jane Slaughter), in the midst of unearthing Den's corpse. When this becomes public knowledge, Den is pronounced dead and Chrissie feigns grief whilst also comforting Sharon over her loss. Sam tells the police everything about Den's murder, but this backfires when Den's bloodstains are found under Sam's sink and her story constantly changes. Chrissie seizes an opportunity to incriminate Sam for the crime by convincing Kat to get her cousin, Stacey (Lacey Turner), to give the police a false alibi that Zoe and Chrissie were with her on the night Den died. Sam is then arrested.

In the build-up to Den's funeral, Chrissie is unnerved when Sam's mother Peggy (Barbara Windsor) returns to Walford. They initially get along until Sam's cousin, Billy (Perry Fenwick), informs Peggy about the events of Den's murder and how Sam is suspected of committing the crime. Sam tells her mother that Chrissie killed Den and framed her for the crime. This prompts Peggy to go looking for Chrissie, who is preparing to deliver a eulogy at Den's funeral when Peggy arrives, disruptively brands Chrissie a "murderer" and tells everyone that she killed Den. The situation escalates when Peggy slaps Chrissie, causing her to fall into Den's grave on top of the coffin. When they have another confrontation in the pub, everybody believes Chrissie over Peggy. Following another quarrel at a party where Peggy accuses Kat of helping Chrissie frame Sam just to cover up Zoe's involvement, Stacey learns the truth and starts blackmailing Chrissie for money. She later returns the money, feeling guilty. Eventually, Jake questions Chrissie and she admits to killing Den. At first Jake is horrified, but realises how Den betrayed Chrissie and that she would never have killed him had he treated her better. To get her trust, he reveals that he had witnessed his mob boss Johnny Allen (Billy Murray) murder Andy Hunter (Michael Higgs) on the night she killed Den. As her relationship with Jake continues once more, Chrissie plans to sell the pub to Johnny and attempts to get Jake to pressure his boss into agreeing, asserting that she now has leverage on Johnny over Andy's murder. Jake reluctantly complies and a business partnership ensues between Chrissie and Johnny. When Johnny pulls out of the partnership due to Peggy's persuasion, Chrissie reveals that she knows he killed Andy and appears ready to blackmail him. However, Johnny responds that he knows that Chrissie killed Den, but agrees to continue the deal, warning Chrissie about threatening him next time.

Chrissie and Johnny are alarmed when Peggy's two hardman sons Phil (Steve McFadden) and Grant (Ross Kemp) return to help with their mother's campaign for Sam's exoneration. Grant confronts her in the pub over Sam's wrongful incarceration for Den's murder. Even when Phil and Grant continue to pressure Chrissie over what she did to Den and Sam respectively, Chrissie remains unfazed, especially due to having Sharon's support. After Sharon learns the truth, Chrissie begins to make mistakes as she plans with Jake to flee the country. They have an argument at Johnny's nightclub, where she describes to him how she killed Den with the doorstop. Johnny catches this on CCTV and tells Jake that he has a recording of her confession. Johnny takes advantage by telling Chrissie that she must sleep with him. She refuses due to not wanting to betray Jake; Johnny then tells Phil and Grant about the tape. As the Mitchells work with Sharon and Dennis, Stacey's alibi is eventually broken and the police visit Chrissie once more to question her. She is able to stall them and the police leave without enough evidence to prove Chrissie's guilt. The Mitchell brothers seize the tape and Jake rushes to alert Chrissie. The pair are discreetly leaving the square until Patrick Trueman (Rudolph Walker) stops them leaving and Billy discovers this, informing the police of which airport Chrissie is heading off to. At the airport, Chrissie waits for Jake to return with the tickets. Just as he walks towards her and Chrissie starts to book her flight, she finds herself confronted by Sharon and the police. After they exchange words, Sharon punches Chrissie, before the police arrest Chrissie for Den's murder.

Chrissie says that she will only co-operate in exchange for a meeting with Sharon. This is given, and she tries to make Sharon understand why she killed her father, but to no success. Sam is released on bail and flees to Brazil with Phil's help. Weeks later, Jake visits Chrissie in prison and asks her to marry him. She finds out that he has lost the £25,000 that was to be her bail money and storms out of the visiting room, calling Jake an idiot. Chrissie decides to plot revenge on Sharon for sending her to prison by trying to force her stepdaughter to testify in court about what Den was really like, wanting to see Sharon crumble at confessing his crimes. After a week in prison, Chrissie decides to call off her plan, when it becomes clear that she still thinks of Sharon as a daughter. She dismisses her solicitor and pleads guilty to murder, which partly clears Sam and Zoe for the crime. Chrissie is sentenced to life imprisonment for Den's murder in December 2005. Jake later visits her in prison and Chrissie convinces him to not visit again due to her sentence. He agrees, despite professing his love for her. After bidding an emotional farewell to each other, Chrissie watches Jake leave the visiting room, and she walks back into her prison cell with a contented smile.

Chrissie is mentioned in September 2009, when Sam (this time played by Danniella Westbrook), is arrested and charged with perverting the course of justice for her role in Den's death, following her return from Brazil, and frets to her ex-husband Ricky Butcher (Sid Owen) that it is only a matter of time before she bumps into Chrissie whilst awaiting her sentence in prison.

=== 2024–2026 ===
In September 2024, Sharon is sent to prison for seven days after being held in contempt of court, for degrading the judge during Dean Wicks's (Matt Di Angelo) trial for the murder of Keanu Taylor (Danny Walters). After she is led into her cell, the prison officer enters the cell of an inmate next door and delivers contraband cigarettes – the inmate is then revealed to be Chrissie. Sharon's cellmate Doreen "Dor" Coleman (Sonia Ritter) reunites Sharon with Chrissie. After serving nearly 19 years in prison, Chrissie is top dog of the prison, though is eligible for parole soon. Sharon is initially annoyed by Chrissie's presence, but Chrissie tries to help by lending Sharon her phone to call her son, Albie Watts. Sharon and Chrissie have a heated confrontation where they talk about the past and Chrissie's murder of Den. Sharon, relating to her experience with Keanu before his death, forgives Chrissie. However, it is later revealed Chrissie has set Sharon up for a fight with the other inmates. The plan backfires when the inmates refuse to harm Sharon. Sharon finds out that Chrissie was behind the set-up and takes back her forgiveness. Chrissie later encourages another set-up in prison, by falsely tipping off the prison guards about hidden drugs in Dor's mattress, which leads to a fight between the inmates.

Chrissie later drags Sharon back to her cell, threatening her with a shiv and boiling water. She reveals that she had miscarried Jake's baby shortly after being imprisoned, and blames Sharon for teaming up with the Mitchells, and putting her in prison. As Chrissie attempts to stab Sharon, the guards intervene and place Chrissie in segregation. Chrissie threatens to expose Sharon's involvement in Keanu's murder if she reports the incident and ruins her chances of parole. Sharon decides not to report the incident, and they later make amends before Chrissie is granted parole. Before she leaves, Chrissie drops a bombshell on Sharon, revealing that Johnny Allen's daughter Ruby (Louisa Lytton) was previously her cellmate and had been moved after having Martin Fowler's (James Bye) child. Chrissie is reunited with Jake, revealing that he is alive. After a brief stop in Albert Square, they drive away for a new life together.

Chrissie returns to Walford on Christmas Eve 2025 and is revealed as Zoe's stalker, having enlisted the help of Zoe's estranged daughter, Jasmine Fisher (Indeyarna Donaldson-Holness). The next day, Chrissie returns to The Queen Vic and reveals herself to Zoe and Kat, exposing Jasmine's true parentage. Chrissie explains that, after learning of Zoe's shooting that September, she decided to return to Walford to confront her, eventually meeting Jasmine and deciding to join forces to exact revenge on Zoe, whom she blames for her imprisonment owing to her one-night stand with Den. Jasmine decides to part ways with Chrissie when she realises that she has been manipulated after Zoe, Kat, and Sam (now played by Medcalf again) reveal Chrissie's past, though Chrissie warns Jasmine to flee the area before the police arrive. Soon, police arrest Zoe for the murder of Anthony Trueman (Nicholas Bailey), leading Kat to believe that Chrissie actually killed Anthony and framed Zoe.

With Jake's help, Zoe finds and confronts Chrissie, who reveals she did not kill Anthony. She reveals that she was able to manipulate Zoe and Jasmine's thoughts because they were emotionally vulnerable, hinting that Jasmine is actually Anthony's true killer. Chrissie departs Walford with Jake after he proposes to her.

== Reception ==
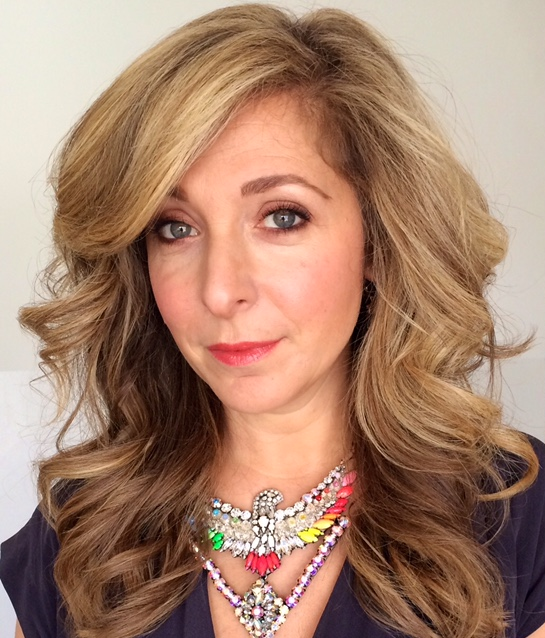
Tracy-Ann Oberman's portrayal of Chrissie earned her praise

As the wife of Den Watts, one of British soap's biggest figures, Chrissie was a high-profile character, with the turns in her storylines regularly splashed across the tabloid papers, becoming, in the words of reporter Katherine Hassell, "a national TV heroine after she arrived in Albert Square in 2004 as the wife of the resurrected Dirty Den". The character's tough and steely persona was widely cited by TV critics, such as Imogen Ridgway of the Evening Standard, who felt Chrissie to be the "dominant female character" in the show, maintaining an increasingly threatened EastEnders tradition of the independent, forceful female figure: "For a soap originally underpinned by dominant female characters, it seems odd that Chrissie Watts is apparently the only strong woman left in Walford".

Oberman won praise for her "three-dimensional portrayal of a classic soap bitch", with Chrissie hailed as "helping revive the show's fortunes that had been lagging somewhat in recent years". According to the Daily Mirror reporter Elizabeth Hassell, the character became a "national TV heroine" to viewers shortly after arriving, for standing up to the antics of her dastardly husband, and is most often cited as a "strong" and "clever" woman, as well as being "hard as nails" in "the grand tradition of landladies of The Queen Vic". Although generally well received by viewers, the character was derided by Jim Shelley of the Daily Mirror. Other critics have variously called Chrissie a "witch", "venomous", and the show's resident "black widow".

The storyline involving Den's death was among the most prominent of the decade, and generated intense media and public interest. Looking back on the period, Oberman noted the remarkable nature of the story:

At the time, you get so involved with the work you don't think about it. However, I didn't realise how much of an enormous impact that storyline had. When I think back to how Michelle, Kim [Medcalf] and I were on the cover of the magazines week in and week out for about a month. The whole country was talking about it. That was a real moment for me. I took it a bit in my stride at the time but going to the National TV Awards and being nominated for Best Newcomer was very exciting. I was only working there for a few weeks before becoming the landlady of The Queen Vic!

The special 1-hour 20th anniversary episode where Chrissie killed Den was watched by 14.34 million people on the night it was broadcast, attracting "almost 60% of possible viewers", with a peak share of 57.8%. It was the highest rated episode of EastEnders that year, and has since only been bested by a showing on Christmas Day 2007 (which drew anomalous large audiences for all BBC One programmes that year), and the 25th anniversary episode. Final figures for the broadcast, which factored in digital and recorded viewings, rose to over 17 million, making it the highest rated screening of a British soap since 2003. The episode received a huge amount of media interest, and was highly praised for displaying "some of the tightest, funniest dialogue this soap has seen". Oberman revealed that she could not stop laughing during filming of the scenes, as Grantham's hair was stuck to the floor: "We did lots of takes and poor Leslie was on his back for hours with fake blood all around his head. The liquid dried and his hair was glued to the floor. When he got up it ripped his hair out!"

The aftermath dominated EastEnders in 2005 and helped to revive the fortunes of the show. According to the former head of BBC Drama Serials, Mal Young, this was dependent on the character of Chrissie, who was responsible for "anchoring the success of the anniversary storyline". A similar sentiment was expressed by Ian Hyland in the Sunday Mirror, who although critical of the convuluted plot felt EastEnders was improving "mainly because Chrissie is doing her best to rescue the fallout from the storyline dirty bomb Den's murder has become", and described the character as performing a "rescue act" on the show. However, Jim Shelley of the Daily Mirror was highly critical of Chrissie, calling her "the ludicrous Lady MacBeth wannabe", and felt her departure was ennabling EastEnders to move forward. In contrast, the TV editor of The Daily Telegraph hailed Chrissie as "helping revive the show's fortunes that had been lagging somewhat in recent years".

Oberman has described her time on the show as "hectic". During Chrissie's tenure there was constant shuffling behind the scenes, with three different executive producers taking the reins, with each new producer bringing in new writing teams. Uncertainty came to be manifested in writing and scripts, with character inconsistencies and plot holes working their way into production. One notable example was ownership of The Queen Victoria, with Chrissie legally owner of half the pub after Den legitimately signed over the deed before they renewed their vows in February. However, in November, this fact was forgotten, with Chrissie shown as forging Den's signature to nullify her ownership of the pub, which legally became Sharon's. Problems with the script did not escape Oberman, who criticised her character's storylines after she left the show, saying the writers "must have been on crack", adding that "plots didn't make logical or emotional sense – but they said, 'That's the soap convention, dear, get used to it'". She also considered some scenes to be irresponsible, saying "I was worried when four-year-olds said to me, 'I saw you kill Den.' I don't agree with censorship but there has to be a level of responsibility."

One of the consequences of all the uncertainty behind the scenes was Chrissie's final fate, which was left largely unresolved. Oberman revealed in July 2009 that there were originally plans for a trial, but that poor timing ultimately shelved the storyline. She recalled how the storyline "was put on hold and then there was a whole different team involved after that. I know that if they couldn't get me, Michelle and Kim together, [they wouldn't do it]. And I'd moved straight on to Doctor Who, too. Nobody was available until the following year, by which point Michelle was in Bionic Woman, I was pregnant and Kim was in Cabaret." Because of this "I never felt it was finished off and I would have loved to have wrapped it up." She went on to declare her desire to return for a proper resolution. "I'd love to finish off Chrissie's storyline because I love the character and I do feel that she was left in limbo. To know what happened to her would be great. Even if she went back to say goodbye or wanted to make peace with Sam. Or maybe we could see her in prison?"

In a 2009 interview, Oberman commented on the significance of the character to EastEnders and viewers, saying "I can't believe that I'm still recognised so much as Chrissie. I still get a lot of letters about her, too. I think that she had as much of an impact as Janine (Charlie Brooks) did, which surprised me. Chrissie wasn't around for that long but she was an amazing character with an epic storyline."

Oberman was nominated for a number of awards for her portrayal of Chrissie Watts. In 2004, she was nominated for Most Popular Newcomer at the National Television Awards; she also received four nominations at The British Soap Awards, for Best Newcomer in 2004, Villain of the Year in 2005 and 2006, and Soap Bitch of the Year in 2006. In 2005, she was nominated for Best Actress and Best Bitch at the Inside Soap Awards. In 2020, Sara Wallis and Ian Hyland from the Daily Mirror put Chrissie 41st on their ranked list of the Best EastEnders characters of all time, writing that the character had "an eventful 18 months in Walford".

== See also ==
- List of soap opera villains
