= Dennis Rickman =

Fictional character from EastEnders

- EastEnders character
- Portrayed by: Nigel Harman
- Duration: 2003–2005
- First appearance: Episode 2499; 14 April 2003
- Last appearance: Episode 3075; 30 December 2005
- Created by: Louise Berridge
In-universe information
- Occupation: Gangster; Career criminal Doorman; Barman; Bookmaker
- Family: Watts
- Father: Den Watts
- Mother: Paula Rickman
- Stepmother: Chrissie Watts
- Half-sisters: Vicki Fowler; Sharon Watts (adoptive)
- Wife: Sharon Watts (2005)
- Sons: Dennis Rickman Jnr
- Granddaughters: Alyssa Lennox
- Grandfathers: Dennis Watts
- Grandmothers: Valerie Rickman

Dennis Rickman is a fictional character from the BBC soap opera EastEnders, played by Nigel Harman. He made his first appearance on 14 April 2003 at the funeral of his late mother, Paula, before going on to become one of the show's central protagonists from 1 May 2003 up until his last appearance in the episode broadcast on 30 December 2005, when the character was fatally stabbed at the start of the New Year Fireworks.

He originally came to Walford - a fictional borough in East London - in 2003 as a new member of the Watts family who had a difficult past and rough childhood, though his identity was unknown for almost thirty years. Dennis soon became a regular presence in Walford's market town Albert Square, and in the summer of that year he murdered his former gangland boss Jack Dalton (Hywel Bennett) after discovering that the latter was responsible for the apparent death of Dennis's illegitimate father Den Watts (Leslie Grantham) in February 1989. Before he killed Dalton, however, Dennis discovered that Den had actually survived the shooting and - thanks to the help of his father's old mistress Jan Hammond (Jane How) - partly contributed to Den's eventual return in September 2003. The follow-up of Den's comeback saw him and Dennis compete against each other in a longstanding conflict that eventually came to an end in 2005 when Den was ultimately killed off on the show's twentieth anniversary episode dated 18 February 2005; Dennis later discovered his father's fate on 29 August 2005, the same day he finally married his adopted sister Sharon Watts (Letitia Dean) after the couple managed to repair their once-forbidden romance.

During his time on the show, Dennis established an intense feud with his alpha-male rival and the square's undisputed top-dog kingpin Phil Mitchell (Steve McFadden) - also Sharon's on-off boyfriend. He also bonded with his and Sharon's half-sister Vicki Fowler (Scarlett Alice Johnson); formed a mutual friendship with Dalton's right-hand mobsman Andy Hunter (Michael Higgs); embarked on an initial relationship with his brief girlfriend Zoe Slater (Michelle Ryan); developed a warm companionship with local gossip Dot Cotton (June Brown); slept with his acquaintance Kate Morton (Jill Halfpenny) during her marriage prospects with Phil; instituted major interactions with Sharon's family friend Pauline Fowler (Wendy Richard) along with fellow neighbour Pat Harris (Pam St Clement) and Zoe's surrogate father Charlie (Derek Martin); temporarily clashed with Phil's brother Grant (Ross Kemp) over the latter's previous marriage with Sharon; and later teamed up with the Mitchell Brothers, along with their mother Peggy (Barbara Windsor) and cousin Billy (Perry Fenwick), to help their family bring Sharon's stepmother Chrissie (Tracy-Ann Oberman) to justice for killing Den and framing Peggy's daughter Sam (Kim Medcalf) for his murder.

In his exit storyline towards the climax of 2005, Dennis became emboriled in a conflict with the square's reigning crime lord Johnny Allen (Billy Murray). This came to an unfortunate end when Dennis brutally attacked Johnny for threatening him and throttling Sharon into leaving Walford, as well as killing Andy on the night Den died earlier on. Subsequently, Johnny survived the attack and arranged for his henchman Danny Moon (Jake Maskall) to kill Dennis in retribution; Dennis was later stabbed on that night amid the New Year fireworks celebrating 2006 and he ultimately died in Sharon's arms.

Nearly three months after the character's death, Dennis became the posthumous catalyst for the Get Johnny Week storyline in which Phil and Grant sought to help Sharon avenge his death by bringing Johnny to justice; in the end, Dennis's death was avenged when his killer Danny was shot dead by his brother Jake (Joel Beckett), while Johnny was forced by his daughter Ruby (Louisa Lytton) to surrender himself to the police after she discovered that her father was responsible for Dennis's murder. Later on, Dennis's death ends up getting avenged by Ruby's boyfriend Sean Slater (Robert Kazinsky), when he causes Johnny to die of a heart attack, following the latter's sentencing to life imprisonment for Dennis's murder. Sharon later gave birth to her and Dennis's son, Denny. In early January 2014, Sharon finally learned the truth about Dennis's death from Phil, and the subject is raised again after Denny dies in February 2020 following a quarrel with her closest friend Ian Beale (Adam Woodyatt) in the programme's 35th anniversary special.

The character of Dennis Rickman quickly became established as the show's leading man and a "soap sex-symbol", with Harman noted for his "dark good looks" and "fantastic" physique. In 2003, Harman won the "Best Newcomer" award at the National Television Awards, and for two years straight (in 2004 and 2005) won both "Best Actor" and "Sexiest Male" categories at the British Soap Awards and Inside Soap Awards.

== Creation and development ==
=== Introduction ===
Dennis Rickman was created by the show's producers as the hardman successor to the character of Steve Owen, who had bowed out during the previous year. It was also part of a move to bring the Watts family back to the forefront of EastEnders, with the re-introduction of Vicki Fowler occurring at the beginning of 2003, and the highly anticipated return of Den Watts in September. Executive producer Louise Berridge was also keen to rectify what she felt was a gender imbalance in the cast, commenting after his arrival that Dennis had "provided a surge of testosterone in a show that was rather female-heavy since the arrival of the Slaters."

=== Casting ===
"It took weeks of auditions and I didn't have a clue who I was going to play - it was such a secret. When they told me I was playing Den's son, I laughed my head off. It's a real challenge and I know a lot is riding on this."

— Nigel Harman

Harman was working as a lorry driver for supermarket chain Sainsbury's when he was cast in the role of Dennis Rickman: "They said: 'You've got the job.' I was sitting there in my Sainsbury's fleece, with Mrs Bloggs's groceries in the back, and I just laughed my arse off." However, Harman revealed in a 2003 interview that he actually auditioned for a character called "Tim", and had no idea that he was set to join the Watts family as the unknown son of the soap's most "iconic" figure, Den Watts. Part of Harman's appeal lay in his dark good looks and appealing physicality. EastEnders executive producer Louise Berridge noted: "We cast Nigel for his tremendous acting ability and his screen presence, but there's no question he's also a very sexy young man." In an interview with The Independent in 2003 he commented on his character's status as a sex symbol: "It's Dennis, not me... I am a bit embarrassed... I don't get off on it. I walk into the living-room in the morning in my jogging pants, with my hair all over the place, and my flatmates say: 'So, you're supposed to be one of the sexiest men in the country?' And I go: 'I know. I don't get it either.'"

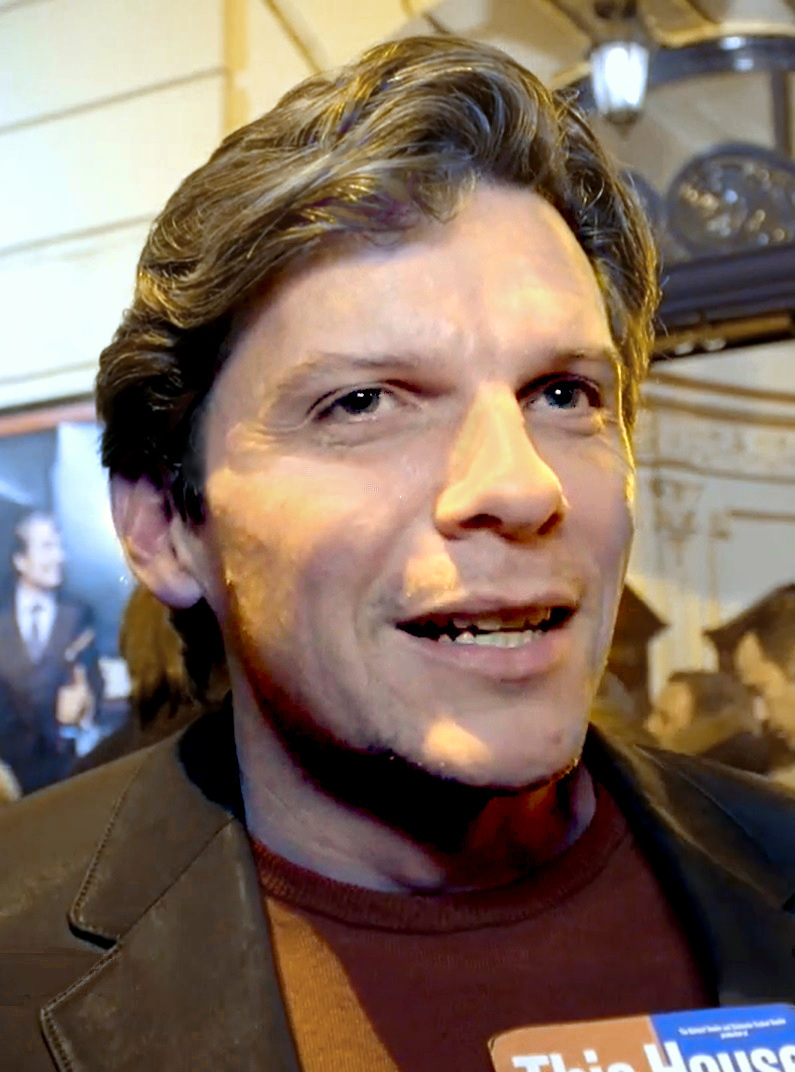
Nigel Harman (pictured) was cast as "bad boy" Dennis in 2003.

=== Characterisation ===
Dennis is characterized by his roguish manner, a "bad boy" cast in the mould of a "young Dirty Den". Harman described his character as "a bit of a rough diamond" but with "a sensitive side". During his time on the show, Dennis often butted heads with various alpha-males such as hardman Phil Mitchell (Steve McFadden) and crime boss Johnny Allen (Billy Murray) but developed a friendship with mobsman Andy Hunter (Michael Higgs) and also established a warm relationship with local gossip, Dot Cotton (June Brown).

The representation of Dennis as "smouldering thug" was apparent from his first appearance in Walford, when he hit resident top dog Phil Mitchell. In an interview with the Daily Mirror Harman declared, "He is a total bastard and if I met him in real life, I'd be bloody scared. [But] that's why he's such a brilliant part." According to the official EastEnders website, "Dennis may well be able to turn on the charm with the ladies, but he has a certain sinister edge."

== Storylines ==
Dennis Rickman makes his first appearance in handcuffs in April 2003, as he is on day release from prison to attend his mother's funeral. It soon transpires that he was the product of a fling between his teenaged mother Paula and her adult ex-lover Den Watts (Leslie Grantham). The discovery of his existence comes after Sharon discovers that she has a brother through her adoptive father Den Watts and another woman during the 1970s. Sharon was aware that her brother was called Dennis Rickman and that he grew up in Walford as well. She later finds out that there was a Mr. Rickman who lived locally and worked as a taxi driver, but he and his wife had both died and their daughter was living alone in their house. Sharon soon locates the house but learns from a neighbour that Paula has just died.

It is gradually revealed that he was neglected as a child by his mother and abused by a succession of her boyfriends, ultimately spending some time living in a children's home. Den was unaware that he had a son, and by the time Dennis meets Sharon and Vicki, 14 years have passed since Den disappeared and supposedly died as a result of a shooting on a canal towpath.

In May 2003, Dennis arrives in Walford and is looking for his sisters. He encounters Sharon's former boyfriend Phil Mitchell (Steve McFadden), also the square's local hardman, and they exchange words in The Queen Victoria public house that results with Dennis punching Phil in the end. This launches a feud between Dennis and Phil that escalates when the pair embark on a love triangle with Kate Morton (Jill Halfpenny), an ex-policewoman and Phil's wife-to-be who formerly dated Dennis in the past. Dennis further infuriates Phil by seducing the latter's sister Sam (Kim Medcalf) and his daughter's nanny Joanne Ryan (Tara Lynne O'Neill) on separate occasions. The two later arrange to have a fight in a garage, but Phil instead has Dennis beaten up in the end.

At one point, however, Dennis and Phil are forced to put their differences aside due to their mutual acquaintanceship with gangland boss Jack Dalton (Hywel Bennett). It soon turns out that Dennis had worked for Dalton since the age of 16, collecting debts amongst other things, and his prison stint is due to an act of GBH which was committed during his work for Dalton in the past; Dennis since then viewed Dalton as a father figure. After Dennis's release, Dalton orders Phil to kill Dennis after he becomes independent of him. However, Dennis ends up killing Dalton in a shooting next to a railway line, but not before Dalton reveals that Den survived the 1989 shooting, and that the body found in the canal a year later was in fact that of another local gangster who had been murdered on Dalton's orders for failing to kill Den. Dennis later tracks down Den's former mistress Jan Hammond (Jane How) and finds out that Den fled to Spain. He flies out to Spain and finds the address where Den is now believed to be living, but lacks the courage to knock on the door and find out. He later reveals all to Sharon, but she refuses to believe that her adoptive father is still alive.

The rivalry with Phil is concluded by Den himself when he returns from Spain in September 2003, confirming the theory which Dennis had uncovered two months earlier. Den and Dennis trick Phil into committing an armed robbery at a local factory. They then abscond with the escape ladder and most of the cash, though Den leaves Phil with a few stolen notes and a gun to incriminate him. The feud brings Dennis closer to his father. As such Dennis remains friends with Dalton's second-in-command Andy Hunter (Michael Higgs), and is left the bookmakers in Andy's will after Andy's death at the hands of Johnny Allen (Billy Murray) in February 2005. However, Andy's death was believed to have been suicide at the time, which buys Johnny an extra year of freedom - as Dennis will find out to his cost.

Dennis has a passionate fling with Den's adopted daughter Sharon Watts (Letitia Dean) on the eve of Den's return but finds himself rejected when Den re-establishes himself on the Walford scene. They resume their affair in secret but Den cannot accept a relationship between his children and plots to split them up. Den taunts Dennis with the suggestion that someone had sexually abused him while he was in a children's home, successfully provoking Dennis into accidentally hitting Sharon. A guilt-ridden Den later apologises and explains his reasons for not wanting his son and daughter together, because he wants both of them in his life and he cannot have that if they are sleeping together. Den then tries to explain to Dennis that his feelings for Sharon are simply misguided due to the abuse he supposedly suffered as a child, which leaves Dennis confused and so he decides to break up with Sharon in the hope of having a proper father-son relationship.

Meanwhile, the Watts family reform their strong bond, which includes the introduction of Den's new wife Chrissie Watts (Tracy-Ann Oberman), who follows him back to England from Spain a few months after his return to Walford. Dennis moves in with Zoe Slater (Michelle Ryan) but cannot reciprocate her love and Sharon seduces him again. They continue their affair in secret behind Zoe and Den's backs, and feel unable to continue their secretive relationship, and plan to leave on Christmas Day.

However, Den had spotted them kissing on Christmas Eve. When they announce that they are in love and going to America together on Christmas Day, Zoe announces that she is pregnant. Dennis does not want to be an absent father to the baby, so Sharon leaves without him. He stays with Zoe but refuses to sleep with her. Zoe, who has feigned the pregnancy in order to prevent Dennis from leaving. She is desperate to get pregnant for real and resorts to sleeping with Den, who had told her to feign the pregnancy in his own attempt to split Sharon from Dennis.

Dennis eventually begins to feel love for Zoe and looks forward to a life with her and the baby. However, when Dennis catches her and Den in bed and discovers she was never pregnant at all, he leaves but not before informing Chrissie about her and Den.

Dennis and Sharon marry (2005)

Dennis and Sharon return to Walford in the summer of 2005, demanding to see Den himself. Dennis has his doubts about Chrissie's story that Den had left her a few months before in favour of another woman, but drops the matter to spare Sharon's feelings. Dennis also has a truce with Zoe before she leaves, after which her father Charlie (Derek Martin) apologizes for their family's resentment towards him over the pregnancy scandal. Dennis and Sharon go on to marry soon afterwards, and following this, they learn that Sam had exhumed their father's body from his grave in the cellar of The Queen Victoria public house. Den had been murdered by Chrissie in February 2005 after she, Zoe and Sam confronted him about his manipulation and lies regarding the three of them - which had started just before Christmas 2004, when Den had tricked Sam into selling him The Queen Vic with the pretence that Phil needed money while still on the run from the police. Chrissie had also lured Sharon back to overhear Den's confessions so that Den would lose the one person in his life that he truly loved - which she achieved when Sharon disowned Den and left Walford again. Den had then walked back into the pub and attacked Chrissie before Zoe hit him with a doorstop and supposedly killed him. Den then regained consciousness and grabbed Chrissie, who delivered a fatal blow, but left Zoe to believe she had killed him. The three women then buried his body in the basement, with Chrissie being able to avoid suspicion for the next few months by inventing a story that Den had left her for another woman. With the help of Phil and his brother Grant, Dennis and Sharon soon bring Chrissie to justice and sell The Queen Vic back to the Mitchells, apparently concluding the lengthy feud between the Watts and Mitchell families. Having stayed away from his funeral, Dennis later visits Den's grave and tearfully mourns the father he never had.

Dennis dies in the street as Sharon (right) and Pauline (left) watch on (2005)

On Christmas Day 2005, Sharon is admitted to hospital with suspected food poisoning, but finds out she is pregnant, despite the previous belief that she was infertile following an abortion 10 years earlier. After Dennis interferes with Johnny and condemns his treatment of his teenage daughter Ruby, Johnny attacks Sharon, but upon finding out she is pregnant, he relents and tells Sharon that if she and Dennis are gone by midnight on New Year's Eve, he would not kill Dennis. He also admits that he murdered Andy Hunter nearly a year earlier.

After much insistence from Sharon, they prepare to leave on New Year's Eve to start a new life in the United States. Sharon does not tell Dennis that Johnny has threatened to kill him, but she confides in Phil, who then uses Dennis as a weapon against Johnny, who is also an enemy of his. Phil tells Dennis about Johnny threatening Sharon, and also that Johnny had murdered his friend Andy. Although Dennis knows what Phil is doing, he takes the bait anyway and beats Johnny to the brink of death. Johnny begs for help as he fears he is dying, so Dennis tosses him a mobile phone and says if he can reach it, he will live. Johnny is able to reach the phone and instead of calling for medical assistance, he contacts a henchman to murder Dennis as revenge for his beating.

After cleaning his hands of Johnny's blood, Dennis makes his way towards the Albert Square gardens, where the locals are setting up fireworks ready to welcome in 2006. As he and Sharon lock eyes, Dennis is stabbed in the chest by a mysterious passer-by and collapses. He dies in Sharon's arms seconds into the new year. His last words are "we did it" in reference to their unborn son, who is born six months later and named Dennis "Denny" in honour of his father. It is later revealed that Dennis was stabbed by Johnny's henchman Danny Moon (Jake Maskall) on the night of his murder. Towards the end of March 2006, Phil and Grant confront Johnny in their bid to get justice for Sharon by avenging Dennis's death. The brothers are nearly killed when Johnny captures the two and orders Danny to kill them, but Phil and Grant are saved when Danny is shot dead by his brother Jake (Joel Beckett), who merely attempted to stop Danny, thus partly avenging Dennis's death in the process. As Phil and Grant use this opportunity to race back to Johnny's house, Ruby learns that her father is responsible for Dennis's murder and calls the police about her father's actions, threatening to disown him unless he turns himself in. Johnny ultimately relents at his daughter's urging and when the police arrive, he admits to murdering killing Andy and ordering the murder of Dennis, along with his other criminal activities. Seven months later, Johnny dies in hospital after suffering a heart attack in prison, which struck him down when he was attempting to order the death of Ruby's boyfriend Sean Slater (Robert Kazinsky), upon discovering his plan to extract their assets, the result of which ultimately avenges Dennis's death. This plan, however, fails to materialise and Sean escapes intact.

In October 2012, soon after Sharon returns to Walford with a six-year-old Denny in tow, Phil's latest enemy, Derek Branning (Jamie Foreman), mentions that Dennis was murdered, not knowing that Sharon's six-year-old son overheard him. Denny is upset after learning the truth of his father's death, as he was told by Sharon that his father was a helicopter pilot and died while saving others. Sharon admits to her son that she lied to protect him, and although he is angry, he eventually forgives her. In January 2014, Phil finally confesses to Sharon that he had played a part in Dennis's death - having goaded him into attacking the man who went on to order his death - as Phil's conflict with Johnny ultimately led to Dennis being murdered. Sharon is furious, but then goes to visit Dennis's grave for the last time. It is at that point that Sharon realises she needs to leave Dennis in her past, as Phil is now her future. Months later, Sharon marries Phil and he later adopts Denny in the subsequent years. However, over five years later, on Christmas Day 2019, they end up splitting, after Phil discovers that Sharon had an affair with his daughter's fiancé, Keanu Taylor (Danny Walters). Soon afterwards, Phil seeks revenge on Keanu and they end up fighting each other in a boat on the River Thames, which ends up crashing as a result. Denny is among the passengers on the boat, and, although everyone else survives the crash, he consequently loses his life after suffering a cardiac arrest from drowning in the ensuing carnage.

In 2025, Zoe returns to Walford, and a flashback reveals that she had given birth to twins, a girl and a boy, in 2006. Zoe abandons her son in the hospital after believing that her daughter had died. In September 2025, Zoe tells Sharon and Vicki that she had slept with Dennis and he was the father of her children. Sharon initially believes Zoe is lying, but later agrees to help Zoe find her son, seeing him as the last connection she has to Dennis. Zoe admits to her mother Kat (Jessie Wallace) that she lied about Dennis being the father to fleece Sharon. Kat tells Vicki, who reveals the truth to a devastated Sharon.

== Reception ==
Dennis Rickman was described in a 2004 article as the show's "bad boy pin-up character". The character of Dennis Rickman quickly became established as the show's leading man and a "soap sex-symbol", with Harman noted for his "dark good looks" and "fantastic" physique. In 2003, Harman won the "Best Newcomer" award at the National Television Awards, and for two years straight (in 2004 and 2005) won both "Best Actor" and "Sexiest Male" categories at the British Soap Awards and Inside Soap Awards.

In 2020, Sara Wallis and Ian Hyland from The Daily Mirror placed Dennis 58th on their ranked list of the best EastEnders characters of all time, calling him a "bed-hopping criminal" who was "a chip off the old block" from his father.

== See also ==
- List of soap opera villains
