= Danny Moon =

Fictional character in the BBC soap opera EastEnders

- EastEnders character
- Portrayed by: Jake Maskall
- Duration: 2004–2006
- First appearance: Episode 2863; 30 December 2004
- Last appearance: Episode 3127; 31 March 2006
- Introduced by: Kathleen Hutchison (2004); Kate Harwood (2006)
In-universe information
- Father: Bobby Moon
- Mother: Alison Moon
- Brothers: Jake Moon
- Other relatives: Alfie Moon; Spencer Moon

Danny Moon is a fictional character from the BBC soap opera EastEnders played by Jake Maskall. He made his first appearance on 30 December 2004 and was initially supposed to last appear in July 2005, but reappeared on 24 March 2006 before the character was killed off on 31 March 2006.

The character debuted alongside his older brother Jake Moon (Joel Beckett) and is established as a cousin of the established character Alfie Moon (Shane Richie). During his time on the show, Danny is involved in several plot lines that contribute to his strained relationship with both Jake and their boss Johnny Allen (Billy Murray). This involves Danny sparking a feud with mob boss Andy Hunter (Michael Higgs), entering a relationship with Andy's ex-wife Sam Mitchell (Kim Medcalf), and killing local hardman Dennis Rickman (Nigel Harman) on Johnny's request.

In March 2006, Danny's character arc ended during the Get Johnny Week storyline, when he attempts to kill Sam's brothers Phil (Steve McFadden) and Grant (Ross Kemp) on Johnny's orders - only to be accidentally killed by Jake after the latter discovered the truth about Dennis' murder. As such, Jake also comes to realize through Danny's "bond" with Johnny's daughter Ruby (Louisa Lytton) of just how their involvement in Johnny's criminal reign has rendered Danny mentally unstable beyond repair — thus destroying their brotherly interaction in the process.

== Storylines ==
Danny Moon first arrives in Albert Square - the community of Walford, a fictionalized borough in East London - in late December 2004, along with his older brother Jake (Joel Beckett). Their second cousin, Alfie (Shane Richie) is not happy to see them since, they are always in trouble - as evident when it quickly turns out that Alfie had previously taken the blame for their crimes and went to prison for three years for credit card fraud. He nevertheless allows Jake and Danny to stay at his house in exchange for helping him and his younger brother Spencer (Christopher Parker) look after their grandmother, Nana (Hilda Braid).

It soon transpires that Danny and Jake are henchmen who work for their crime boss Johnny Allen (Billy Murray), who recently ordered them to deliver a package on his behalf; this was unsuccessful due to Danny's incompetence and Jake later uncovering drugs in the package. Johnny soon arrives in Walford to confront the brothers over the situation, and they are forced to explain the drugs in the package. After ordering them to remain in Walford for further examination of their progress, Johnny arranges for Jake and Danny to work for the square's gangland kingpin - Andy Hunter (Michael Higgs).

Their efforts to impress Johnny by working for Andy grow difficult when the latter sparks a feud with the brothers, with Danny particularly clashing with Andy on several occasions. This continues when it is publicly alleged that Andy has organized the death of his employee Paul Trueman (Gary Beadle), to which Danny tauntingly probes Andy regarding his inability to cover up his tracks. Andy later plans to get revenge on Danny by roping him in his scheme to defraud Johnny out of his £750,000 and deceiving him into believing that both Jake and Johnny view him as weak, further asserting that Danny's contribution would change Johnny's viewpoint on him instead of Jake. He reluctantly agrees and helps Andy in his scheme, after which Andy betrays Danny by leaving him behind. However, Andy's scheme fails when Johnny intercepts his plan and kills Andy by throwing him off a motorway bridge. The next day, Danny learns about Andy's death and - deducing that Johnny killed him - becomes paranoid that Johnny will kill him next. His attempts to calm down over the situation lead to Danny having a brief relationship with Andy's estranged wife, Sam Mitchell (Kim Medcalf). Later on, Danny is enraged when Johnny fires him for incompetence and steals his business idea to expand his nightclub - Scarlet. In retaliation, he sets fire to Johnny's house and uses the incident to try to prove to Johnny how he should be taken more seriously.

Danny and Jake later plan on leaving Walford before Johnny finds out, but are caught out when Johnny finds Danny and forces him into his car. Jake then gets into the car to stay with his brother. Johnny drives them to a forest and locks Jake in the car as he prepares to shoot Danny; however, Jake kicks the car window out and escapes into the woods to find them. He tries to persuade Johnny not to kill Danny. The episode ends with Johnny raising the gun at both of them, however, their fate is not revealed until a few months later when Jake turns up, where it turns out that Johnny let them go: under the agreement that they were not seen again. Johnny allows Jake to stay in Walford but refuses for Danny to ever return. Jake reveals that Danny has gone abroad.

Off-screen, Danny begins working for Johnny to make amends for his actions. On New Year's Eve 2005, Johnny contacts Danny and orders him to murder Andy's best friend, Dennis Rickman (Nigel Harman) - who had severely beaten Johnny in retribution for killing Andy and threatening to harm Dennis' wife Sharon Watts (Letitia Dean). Returning to the Square that same night, Danny stabs Dennis in the chest and slips away unseen; Dennis ends up dying in Sharon's arms. He later reveals this to Jake, by showing him a video of the murder, on his mobile phone. Jake is later summoned to Scarlet, only to be greeted by Danny - who is there to look after things for Johnny during the latter's absence; Johnny has moved to Essex. Danny reveals his working relationship with Johnny. After hearing that his grandmother Nana (Hilda Braid) has died, he leaves again.

Towards the end of March 2006, Sam's two older brothers Phil (Steve McFadden) and his brother Grant (Ross Kemp) - dubbed the "Mitchell Brothers" in Walford - arrive in Essex with the intention of bringing Johnny to justice for Dennis' murder on behalf of Sharon, who had previously married Grant until she had an affair with Phil. It soon emerges at this point that Danny has been staying with Johnny in Essex. When Johnny gets ambushed by the Mitchell Brothers, he asks Danny to look after his daughter Ruby (Louisa Lytton) while he deals with Phil and Grant alone. Danny's behavior then shows signs of mental illness when he refers to Johnny as "dad" when asks Ruby if he ever talks about him. He also tells Ruby to get undressed but promises not to look. He then drugs Ruby with sleeping pills and lies on her bed, watching her sleep. Jake eventually tracks Danny down and tries to persuade him to return to Walford. Danny doesn't want to go because he thinks Johnny needs him and Johnny's home is his home as well. This causes Jake to realize that Danny has become mentally unstable and that Johnny is merely using him to settle down a new life away from Walford.

Johnny returns and is intent on killing the Mitchells with Danny's help. Danny is again confronted by his brother. During the conversation, Danny produces a mobile phone with video evidence that it was he who had killed Dennis on New Year's Eve. After a short struggle, Danny knocks Jake unconscious with a baseball bat and - under Johnny's orders - marches the Mitchells into the nearby woods armed with the shotgun and a spade with the intent to kill and bury them. Just as Danny prepares to execute Grant, he is suddenly killed when Jake appears with a pistol - which Danny had dropped in the earlier struggle between the brothers - and shoots him, albeit unintentionally killing him in the process; Jake had only meant to shoot Danny in the arm or leg to save the Mitchell Brothers.

After confessing that Danny was the one who stabbed Dennis on Johnny's orders, Jake buries his brother in the woods - using the spade to mark his grave - whilst Phil and Grant rush out to confront Johnny, only to find that Ruby has already forced her dad to turn himself in for the murders of Andy and Dennis. The only people who are aware that Jake killed Danny are the Mitchell Brothers, Ruby, and her boyfriend Sean Slater (Robert Kazinsky); a guilt-ridden Jake insists that he never intended for Danny to die.

2026

20 years later after the events of get Johnny Week Danny's death is still largely a secret. When Jake returns in 2026 Alfie suggests he and Danny arrange a reunion, Jake says he is not in touch with Danny at all, mentioning Johnny's influence drew him further away from him. When seeking out Phil Mitchell, Jake reveals during their conversation that he thinks about Danny all the time.
