= Johnny Allen (EastEnders) =

Fictional character from EastEnders

- EastEnders character
- Portrayed by: Billy Murray
- Duration: 2005–2006
- First appearance: Episode 2866; 4 January 2005
- Last appearance: Episode 3243; 20 October 2006
- Created by: Kathleen Hutchison
- Introduced by: Kathleen Hutchinson (2005); Kate Harwood (2006)
In-universe information
- Occupation: Gangster; Career criminal Businessman; Nightclub owner
- Wife: Stephanie Allen (backstory)
- Daughters: Scarlett Allen; Ruby Allen
- Grandsons: Roman Fowler

Johnny Allen is a fictional character from the BBC soap opera EastEnders, played by Billy Murray. He first appeared on 4 January 2005 and became the show's primary antagonist until the character was killed off on 20 October 2006.

Hailed as one of the show's biggest villains to date, the character was an East End crime boss who quickly emerged as the new gangland kingpin of Albert Square. He proceeded to impact his reign through several other characters by going to extreme lengths to maintain control over those around him — notably in the case of his intense feud with the Mitchell brothers, Phil (Steve McFadden) and Grant Mitchell (Ross Kemp).

The character's story arc begins with Johnny usurping fellow mob boss Andy Hunter (Michael Higgs) from his position as the square's reigning crime kingpin. This ultimately leads Andy to try to swindle £750,000 from Johnny in his requested "job." This fails after Johnny intercepts his plan — thanks to Andy's bodyguard, Eddie (Daren Elliott Holmes) — and he ends up killing Andy by throwing him from a motorway bridge in the shows' 20th-anniversary episode. Soon afterward, Johnny forces the local Ferreira family out of Walford before establishing an unlikely friendship with his old acquaintance Pat Butcher (Pam St Clement).

He exiles his errand boy, Danny Moon (Jake Maskall), from the square in retribution for Danny burning down his house. He falls out with Phil and Grant's mother, Peggy (Barbara Windsor), after she turns his daughter Ruby (Louisa Lytton) against him. He also destroys his own relationship with former mistress Tina Stewart (Charlotte Avery); hired Peggy's nephew Billy (Perry Fenwick) to become Danny's replacement until he later fires him for conspiring with his family; developed a conflict with Ruby's best friend, Stacey Slater (Lacey Turner), over the way her rebellious friendship strains his daughter's education; blackmailed Danny's brother Jake (Joel Beckett) with the discovery that his girlfriend Chrissie Watts (Tracy-Ann Oberman) murdered her estranged husband Den (Leslie Grantham) and framed Peggy's daughter Sam (Kim Medcalf) for the crime; constantly tormented Ruby's boyfriend Juley Smith (Joseph Kpobie) upon learning that he is the reason she lost her virginity to him; and arranged for popular hard man Dennis Rickman (Nigel Harman) to be fatally stabbed on New Year's Eve 2005; after being attacked by the latter in retaliation for threatening his adoptive sister-turned-recent wife Sharon (Letitia Dean).

Towards the end of March 2006, Johnny represented the titular "Get Johnny Week" scenario — in which Phil and Grant, who were both previously ex-lovers of Sharon, sought to avenge her loss due to Dennis' murder to bring Johnny to justice! The storyline culminates with Johnny surrendering himself to the police at Ruby's request, although not before it is revealed that Danny had killed Dennis on Johnny's orders — shortly before Danny at the story's climax is then killed by his own brother Jake!

In October 2006, nearly seven months after being sentenced to life imprisonment for his gangland activities, the characters story arc ended with Johnny being axed from the programme. His last appearance was screened during Ruby's eighteenth birthday, wherein Johnny attempted to perpetuate the death of Stacey's brother Sean (Robert Kazinsky) after finding out that he has been forging a romantic business partnership with Ruby to extract control of both her financial welfare and family assets; however, this failed when Johnny ended up having a fatal heart attack in prison, and he dies in hospital off-screen.

This was Murray's second role in the soap, having appeared as a minor character in 1991 called "Mr. X".

== Creation and development ==
Johnny and his casting was announced on 25 October 2004. Billy Murray was cast in the role. The character was said to be "The boss of the bad boys, pure big league. He will make Andy Hunter (Michael Higgs) look like a small fry with his bold dealings". Speaking of his casting, Murray stated, "It's great that I'm going to be part of one of the best shows on television. I'm looking forward to getting my teeth into the role". The character made his debut appearance on 4 January 2005 and it was later revealed via Digital Spy that his daughter Ruby Allen (Louisa Lytton) and girlfriend Tina Stewart (Charlotte Avery) were also set to join the show.

Johnny and Danny plan their revenge on the Mitchells in "Get Johnny Week".

=== "Get Johnny Week" ===
"Get Johnny Week" is a week-long storyline that was first screened in late March 2006. The storyline focuses on Johnny after he retires from his life of crime and reunites the Mitchell brothers, Phil (Steve McFadden) and Grant (Ross Kemp). The week finishes with Johnny's daughter, Ruby, persuading him to hand himself into the police for the murder of Dennis Rickman (Nigel Harman). Johnny gives in to his daughter's wish and is then imprisoned for the murders of Dennis and Andy. However, the episodes were not well received by viewers, and producer Kate Harwood received criticism for the storyline.

=== Departure ===
Murray opted to leave the soap in August 2005, just eight months after his first appearance. Speaking of his departure, Murray stated that the decision to leave had been agreed with executive producer Kate Harwood. He went on to explain, "I sat down recently with the boss, and we decided it would be much better for Johnny to go out with a bang than to hang around the Square for years, aging gracefully." Thus, Murray departed after "Get Johnny Week" when his character was imprisoned.

Johnny is not seen again until October 2006, when Ruby's new boyfriend, Sean Slater (Robert Kazinsky), visits him in prison to taunt him. Furious, Johnny tries to arrange Sean's murder with Jake Moon (Joel Beckett). He fails and dies of a heart attack soon after, accidentally ordering Jake's death in the process.

== Storylines ==
Johnny Allen makes his first appearance on 4 January 2005, when he arrives in Albert Square — the community of Walford, a fictionalized area of East London — to confront his henchmen, Jake Moon (Joel Beckett) and brother Danny Moon (Jake Maskall), for having a problem with his package job; namely to deliver a duffel bag of money to one of his 'mates' in Walford's residential community, Albert Square. When Johnny inspects the bag that Jake and Danny had, he uncovers hidden cocaine and — sensing the problem behind his plan — orders the brothers to remain in the square under further notice. He arranges for the two to stay with their cousin Alfie (Shane Richie) and later has them work for their enemy and the square's reigning crime boss, Andy Hunter (Michael Higgs).

As he quickly helps the Moon brothers with their problems, Johnny expands his business in Walford; he buys the nightclub Angie's Den, which he renames "Scarlet" in honor of his deceased daughter, and the Ferreira family's flat — where he later moves into the house with his younger daughter Ruby (Louisa Lytton). It is at this point where Johnny begins to usurp control of Andy's criminal reign, such as constantly getting Andy to make arrangements on his behalf and ensuring that he is employing both Jake and Danny under his specific terms. This continues when Johnny learns that Andy has arranged for Jake and Danny's grandmother Nana (Hilda Braid) to be mugged and ends up confronting both Andy and the Moon brothers over their feud. Whilst doing so, Johnny witnesses local shopkeeper Patrick Trueman (Rudolph Walker) confronting Andy over the alleged disappearance of his adopted son Paul (Gary Beadle) — whom Andy claims had left the square on Christmas Day 2004. Deducing that Andy had Paul killed, Johnny arranges for his body to be uncovered, and Patrick learns the truth about his son's fate and Andy's role in his death. In doing so, Johnny further deteriorates Andy's public image in the community and proceeds to establish support from many of the Walford residents — including Patrick and his wife, Yolande (Angela Wynter).

In February, tensions continued to rise between Johnny and Andy when the pair had another meeting with Jake. Claiming that he is retiring from his criminal life, Johnny authorizes Andy and Jake to work together on a package deal for him; Jake will oversee Andy being given a case containing £750,000 worth in cash, which Andy will then deliver to Johnny to mark the opening of his nightclub Scarlet. However, Jake later requests that Johnny be pulled out of the deal after being attacked in a fight; Johnny agrees and tells Andy that he will have to do the job on his own. Andy takes the news badly, up to the point where he publicly insults his estranged wife Sam Mitchell (Kim Medcalf) and employee Pat Evans (Pam St Clement) — whom Johnny was once acquainted with years ago — in The Queen Victoria public house. This prompts Den Watts (Leslie Grantham), the pub's landlord and Johnny's old friend, to throw out Andy and his bodyguard, Eddie (Daren Elliott Holmes) — with Johnny's help. Outraged over his humiliation, Andy vows to get revenge on Johnny and hatches a plan to take his £750,000 in their upcoming transaction and flee Walford with the money. Andy tricks Danny into aiding him with his plan under the guise that Danny can prove himself to Johnny after Andy tricks him into believing that Johnny favors Jake and that his brother values him to be weak. On the opening night of Scarlet, Andy succeeds with his plan and betrays Danny by ditching him on the street. Just as Andy is about to flee Walford, Eddie stops the car and claims he needs to go to the bathroom. In reality, Eddie betrays Andy by informing Johnny of his plan. In response, Johnny has Jake intercept Andy and has him come out of the car for 'a conversation'. Realizing too late that Eddie betrayed him, Andy obliges and talks with Johnny as they walk on a motorway bridge. The conversation seemingly ends with the pair going separate ways, as Johnny offers Andy a handshake before giving him 'one final tip.' At that moment, Johnny — after telling Andy, 'Enjoy your flight!' — suddenly throws Andy off the motorway bridge, killing him on impact. As the police arrive on the scene, Johnny orders Eddie to leave before he and Jake return to the square. The next morning, Andy's death becomes public knowledge — though the police depict his demise to be suicide. While the Moon brothers are unnerved by Andy's death, Johnny remains calm and later attends Andy's funeral with Pat, even though she had earlier accused Johnny of murdering Andy.

Following Andy's murder, Johnny employs the Moon brothers to work for him at Scarlet. He soon fires them after Jake and Danny buy stolen alcohol to use in Scarlet, which Johnny is quick to discover. Johnny later recruits Sam's cousin Billy (Perry Fenwick) to replace the Moon brothers and even steals Danny's idea for a salsa night at the club. Danny soon confronts Johnny about this, but Johnny just brushes him off and calls Danny a liability. In response to this, Danny goes to Johnny's house in a drunken state and sets it on fire to try and get his attention. Johnny deduces that Danny is responsible for setting his house on fire and plans to kill him with his own handgun. He abducts Danny in his car and takes Jake along with him when the latter tries to save his brothers. After driving the brothers into the woods, Johnny locks Jake in the car and takes Danny with him for execution. Johnny prepares to kill Danny when Jake, who escaped from the car, intervenes and stops them. Johnny initially considers killing the pair but ultimately orders them to leave Albert Square and never return. While Danny appears to have left the Square for good, Jake returns two months later to support Alfie over family matters; Johnny allows Jake to stay in Walford and later hires him to be his personal bodyguard in the midst of expanding his criminal reign.

When Johnny's former mistress, Tina Stewart (Charlotte Avery), arrives in Walford to recommence their relationship, Ruby becomes upset after discovering this. Over time, Ruby eventually accepts Tina, and they settle their time with Johnny as a family. However, Johnny soon tires of Tina and proceeds to cheat on her with Amy (Nina Fry) — one of the barmaids working at Scarlet. During this time, he plans to expand his business empire by putting in an offer for The Queen Vic. The result of this sparks a conflict with Sam's mother, Peggy (Barbara Windsor) after Johnny outbids her offer to buy the pub. It is soon revealed that there is a history between the two; her deceased husband Eric (George Russo) had worked for Johnny, many years earlier, and they shared an earlier connection with boxing. Generally, Johnny had mistreated Eric — who would end up abusing Peggy as a result; Peggy subsequently blamed Johnny for being the reason why Eric took his frustrations out on her. Peggy also has knowledge of Johnny's past crimes, such as cutting the fingers off the hand of a prostitute named Suzy Laura and brutally beating up his old friend Dougie Collins (David Simeon) for a slight misspelling on a birthday cake. She soon exposes this in front of the residents upon encountering Johnny in the pub. Peggy goes on to describe Johnny's character as a thief and that he has extorted people before proceeding to accuse him of being a murderer — which is later proven to be correct, even though Peggy is among the residents left unaware of Andy's fate. Ruby walks into the pub as the story unravels and soon begins to learn of her father's true past — including that he may be to blame for the deaths of her mother and sister.

Johnny's feud with Peggy continues as she appears to turn his daughter against him, up to the point where Ruby confides to her best friend, Stacey Slater (Lacey Turner) about this, and the pair later inform Tina about his behavior. Johnny soon attempts to warn Peggy off by slamming the door on her fingers and later threatening her, but only succeeds in drifting Ruby further away from him — up to the point where Peggy allows Ruby to visit and even stay at her house. Incensed, Johnny arranges for Peggy to be mugged and summons his enforcer, Sean to carry out the task. When Tina learns about this, she quickly warns Peggy by phoning from her house. Peggy takes Tina's warning seriously and leaves the house, but Sean catches up with her near the bushes. She is nearly attacked until Billy arrives with her two sons, Phil (Steve McFadden) and Grant (Ross Kemp), who rescue their mother by knocking out Sean. The Mitchell brothers learn that Johnny organized the mugging and plan to confront him despite Peggy's reservations, up to the point where she and Billy explain the impact of his gangland reign upon the square. Phil and Grant confront Johnny at his nightclub anyway, and they warn him to stay away from Peggy, but Johnny is unfazed by their threats and declares war on the Mitchell family; he later fires Billy after finding out that he conspired with Peggy and her sons against him. Johnny soon discovers that Tina sabotaged his plan and retaliates by sleeping with Amy. When Ruby discovers this, she informs Tina, and the latter promptly confronts Johnny — which consequently leads to her ending their relationship and leaving Walford for good.

In November, Johnny noticed that the CCTV system at Scarlet had recorded a conversation between Den's widow, Chrissie (Tracy-Ann Oberman), and Jake himself. She confesses to Jake that she had been the one who had murdered Den, which occurred on the same night Johnny killed Andy. But by the time Den's body has been found at The Queen Victoria pub, Sam is accused of the crime and held in custody. As Grant and Billy work with Peggy to get Sam exonerated, Phil begins a conflict with Johnny, as he continues to warn him to stay away from his mother. In order to provoke the Mitchells, Johnny deliberately lets them know about the CCTV recording and later threatens to kill Grant — prompting him and Phil to confront Johnny at the same moment when Jake seeks help in fleeing the country with Chrissie; she and Jake have formed a relationship, following Den's murder. When Johnny calls the Mitchell brothers pathetic like their father, they fight, and Johnny is left battered. He brandishes a gun and threatens to kill them but relents in letting them leave with the video when Ruby walks in and reconciles with her father. She then urges Johnny to inform Phil that his former stepson Ian Beale (Adam Woodyatt) is buying Queen Victoria in his favor, which allows the Mitchells to intercept both Ian and Chrissie. While Phil and Grant work together to prevent Ian from buying the pub, Sam is released when the police catch up with Chrissie and arrest her for murdering Den — thus undoing Johnny's plan altogether. Chrissie is later sentenced to life imprisonment after pleading guilty, leaving Jake devastated.

In December, Johnny continues to clash with Phil and later becomes with his love rival Dennis Rickman (Nigel Harman) — who is Den's illegitimate son and married to his adopted daughter Sharon (Letitia Dean). This escalates when Phil pays local waiter Juley Smith (Joseph Kpobie) to have a relationship with Ruby and then dump her, much to Johnny's annoyance. On Christmas Day, Johnny insults the residents during a party — causing Dennis to throw him out and taunt Johnny on the street. Outraged that Dennis has humiliated him, Johnny responds by attempting to have Sharon leave Walford with Dennis by midnight on New Year's Eve. When Sharon refuses to oblige to his demands, Johnny throttles her and threatens to have Dennis killed if she does not relent. To make his threat even more clear, Johnny indirectly tells Sharon that he killed Andy. This causes Sharon to fabricate an idea to Dennis about them leaving Walford on New Year's Eve to start anew. While Dennis is happy with the idea, Phil notices how uncomfortable Sharon appears to be when encountering Johnny and urges her to talk to him about it. She confided in Phil about the threat Johnny made against her and Dennis the other night. This enrages Phil, who plans to team up with Dennis against Johnny. However, Sharon objects to this and tells Phil that Johnny killed Andy in a bid to explain just how dangerous he is — pleading with him to let her and Dennis leave Walford. Phil reluctantly agrees until he encounters Dennis on the night of New Year's Eve, whereupon he attempts to get Dennis to take revenge on Johnny by revealing that he killed Andy. Although this surprises Dennis since he was the only friend Andy had made prior to Johnny's arrival on the square, he refuses to be tempted at first — telling Phil that his life has changed ever since he killed his gangland boss and Andy's predecessor, Jack Dalton (Hywel Bennett) a few years previously. However, Dennis eventually relents when Phil tells him that Johnny has throttled Sharon as well. Later on, Dennis confronts Johnny at his nightclub about what he did to Andy and Sharon — thus disrupting Johnny's habit of watching the New Year fireworks. Johnny offers to get Dennis a drink and claims that Phil is lying to him about what happened to both Andy and Sharon. But as Johnny does so, Dennis attacks him and leaves him unconscious, moments before the New Year fireworks are due to be seen over the Square. Just as it appears that Dennis and Sharon will reunite amid the celebrations, he is fatally stabbed by a hooded passer-by and dies in Sharon's arms — much to her anguish. At Dennis' funeral, Sharon lashes out at Johnny when he appears to offer his condolences. She later informs Phil that Johnny killed Dennis, and a guilt-ridden Phil swears revenge on Johnny more than ever. After Dennis' funeral, Johnny soon leaves Walford with Ruby in mid-January.

Towards the end of March, Phil tracks down Johnny at his new mansion in the Essex countryside. Phil convinces Grant to help confront Johnny, where the former intends to bring Johnny to justice for Dennis's murder — as he had promised to Sharon. Reluctant at first, Grant agrees, and the Mitchell brothers set off for Johnny's mansion. They chase Johnny down to his office, where Ruby walks out on her father after discovering that he had been withholding alcohol in his safe — even though he claimed to have gotten rid of them. As Ruby leaves, Grant goes to calm her down while Phil uses this opportunity to come face-to-face with Johnny. They talk, and Johnny admits to having Dennis killed, prompting Phil to attack him until Grant stops his brother. Johnny flees, and the Mitchell brothers pursue him until they end up at a scrapyard, where Johnny captures Phil and Grant at gunpoint. It is at this point that Johnny orders Danny to kill Dennis, and Danny has been working at Johnny's mansion since then. When Jake learns about his brother working for Johnny, he arrives at the mansion to take him home — trying to convince him that Johnny is just using him for dirty work. However, Danny refuses to leave the mansion and even ignores Jake when his brother reminds him about the time Johnny originally planned to kill them both. The pair end up in a fight when Danny reveals to Jake that he killed Dennis on Johnny's orders, and Jake attacks him in response; the fight ends with Danny knocking his brother unconscious after being punched by Jake whilst holding him at gunpoint. Johnny later orders Danny to execute Phil and Grant, but Jake intervenes and shoots Danny — killing him, despite the fact that Jake had merely tried to shoot Danny in the leg or arm to stop him from killing the Mitchell brothers. As Jake buries Danny's body and the Mitchell brothers rush back to the mansion, Ruby uncovers Danny's phone and learns the truth about Dennis's murder. She calls the police on her father and urges him to turn himself in — threatening to change her name and disown Johnny otherwise. After learning from Ruby that it is the second anniversary of when her mother and sister were killed, Johnny obliges and is arrested; he is later sentenced to life imprisonment after confessing to all of his crimes, including the murders of Andy and Dennis.

In October, Johnny is contacted by Jake — who shares his concerns with him about Ruby's new relationship with Stacey's hothead brother Sean (Robert Kazinsky). This prompts Johnny to arrange for Sean to visit him, where his attempts to threaten Sean to end his relationship with Ruby are rebuffed — with Sean taunting Johnny at the hint that his plan with dating Ruby is to assert control of her assets. Johnny lashes out at Sean but is forced back into his cell. Humiliated and angry, Johnny desperately attempts to phone Jake in a bid to have Sean killed. Unfortunately, he suffers a heart attack from stress just as he begins to dial. Believing that Jake is on the phone, Johnny proceeds to whisper, 'Jake... kill him for me' before falling unconscious. Johnny's cellmate Cahill (John Ashton) hears his last words and mistakenly believes that Jake is the one he wants to be killed; Jake is later approached by mobsters just as he prepares to leave the square that night after Ruby ends her association with Jake upon blaming him for her father's heart attack, and is presumably killed as a result of this. Elsewhere, Johnny is rushed to hospital, and he dies before Ruby can visit him — leaving her heartbroken. She later arranges for her father's funeral at the end of the month.

Nearly a decade later, in January 2014, Johnny's name resurfaced when Phil — in light of helping his cousin Ronnie (Samantha Womack) cover up the murder of their business rival Carl White (Daniel Coonan) — finally confesses to Sharon that he was the reason Dennis had attacked Johnny and then Johnny had Dennis killed in retaliation. In 2018, Ruby returns to the square and, the following year, buys the nightclub that her father used to own; henceforth, some of Johnny's legacy lives on over the course of Ruby's ownership of the club. In June 2022, Johnny became a grandfather after Ruby gave birth to her son, Roman.

== Reception ==
In 2020, Sara Wallis and Ian Hyland from The Daily Mirror placed Johnny 87th on their ranked list of the best EastEnders characters of all time, calling him the "East End gangster." In February 2025, Radio Times ranked Johnny as the 14th best EastEnders villain, with Laura Denby writing that his "savage killing of Andy was just the start of his reign in Walford", but that while his legacy lived on, his soft spot for Ruby was his "ultimate foil".

== See also ==
- List of soap opera villains
- List of fictional crime bosses
