= Jake Moon =

Fictional character from EastEnders

- EastEnders character
- Portrayed by: Joel Beckett
- Duration: 2004–2006, 2024, 2026
- First appearance: Episode 2863; 30 December 2004
- Last appearance: Episode 7280; 17 February 2026
- Introduced by: Kathleen Hutchison (2004); Chris Clenshaw (2024); Ben Wadey (2026)
In-universe information
- Occupation: Career criminal; Barman; Bar manager
- Father: Bobby Moon
- Mother: Alison Moon
- Brothers: Danny Moon
- Other relatives: Alfie Moon; Spencer Moon

Jake Moon is a fictional character from the BBC soap opera EastEnders, played by Joel Beckett. Jake appears in the show in episodes originally broadcast in the United Kingdom between 30 December 2004 and 20 October 2006. His casting was announced by executive producer Kathleen Hutchison on 20 October 2004. Jake is introduced alongside his younger brother Danny Moon (Jake Maskall) and upon his arrival was described as "the sensitive brother who had an eye for the ladies", while Beckett expressed his happiness at joining the show. In March 2005, Beckett and Maskall were axed but Jake was reintroduced to the show later in the year and remained until late 2006 when actor Joel Beckett decided to leave. On 7 May 2006, Beckett announced that he was leaving the soap and departed on 20 October 2006. His last scene saw him being confronted by mobsters shortly after Johnny had died of a heart attack in prison, but his fate was left unknown. Beckett reprised his role on 12 September 2024 for a one-off appearance, coinciding with Chrissie's release from prison, during which it was revealed that he was still alive. It was announced that Beckett would reprise the role for a short stint in February 2026. He returned in the episode broadcast on 9 February and departed on 17 February.

Jake and Danny are cousins of established character Alfie Moon (Shane Richie). During his time on the show, Jake represents several plotlines that each contribute to his strained interactions with both Danny and their crime boss Johnny Allen (Billy Murray) – most notably in the Get Johnny Week scenario where Jake accidentally kills Danny shortly after learning that Danny had killed local hardman Dennis Rickman (Nigel Harman) on Johnny's orders. This involves the character developing a feud with Johnny's gangland rival Andy Hunter (Michael Higgs), up to the point where Jake witnesses Johnny killing Andy on the show's 20th anniversary episode; sparking a romance with local landlady Chrissie Watts (Tracy-Ann Oberman) that leads to the pair attempting to flee the county after Jake discovered that Chrissie murdered her estranged husband Den (Leslie Grantham) and framed her nemesis Sam Mitchell (Kim Medcalf) for the crime; becoming embroiled in Chrissie and Johnny's respective feuds against the Mitchell family; having a brief conflict with Sam's brothers Phil (Steve McFadden) and Grant (Ross Kemp) in light of both Danny's death and Johnny's arrest; forming a brief relationship with fellow neighbour Carly Wicks (Kellie Shirley); and clashing with his business partner Sean Slater (Robert Kazinsky) upon learning of his scheme to exploit Johnny's adolescent daughter Ruby Allen (Louisa Lytton). His brief return, in which the character was revealed to be alive, saw him reunite with Chrissie following her long-awaited release from prison.

== Creation and development ==
The character's arrival was announced on 20 October 2004, and Beckett was quoted as saying "I've watched the programme since the beginning and I'm very excited to be joining such a successful television institution". Three months after their on-screen arrival, Jake and his brother Danny were axed from the show. However, producer Kate Harwood gave Jake a reprieve, and the character subsequently took a short break from the show which coincided with Danny's exit and then returned.

Jake and Danny always tried to imitate the Mitchell brothers, but second-rate gangsters is all they were. Jake is described, the sensitive brother who had an eye for the ladies.

It was announced on 7 May 2006 that Beckett had quit the role to move on and further his career, and the character made his final appearance on 20 October 2006. Jake ended up with a contract out on his life, after Johnny Allen's dying words were misconstrued. He was last seen leaving Albert Square being confronted by a sinister looking stranger.

Beckett admitted that after receiving a call to return for a 2024 cameo, he was aware that it would be a part of Chrissie Watts's (Tracy-Ann Oberman) return story, but was surprised to learn that his role would take him to Albert Square, commenting: "I thought it would be me standing outside the prison gates". The actor "relished" his time back on the show's set, noting that it felt "lovely" and "really familiar" to be back, adding that it felt like he'd never left. The actor also didn't rule out a possibility of Jake returning full time in the future, stating: "Never say never. I’m sure the audience will let me know if they’d like to see me again, but yes, never say never". It was later announced in 2026 that Beckett would return to the role for a short stint.

== Storylines ==
=== 2004–2006 ===
Jake Moon makes his first appearance on 30 December 2004, arriving in Walford along with his brother Danny (Jake Maskall); the pair soon turn out to be second cousins of Alfie (Shane Richie) and his brother Spencer (Christopher Parker) respectively. Alfie reluctantly allows them to stay with at his house up until the start of 2005, but decides not to chuck them out when Spencer leaves Walford. It quickly becomes clear that Jake and Danny are hiding something from Alfie when the latter takes notices of his cousins' odd behavior, particularly when their crime boss Johnny Allen (Billy Murray) arrives in Walford to confront them; Jake and Danny were supposed to be doing a package deal on Johnny's behalf, but they messed up because of Danny's incompetence – as well as Johnny discovering drugs within the stash bash filled with cash. Wanting Jake to remain in Walford and keep Danny "in check", Johnny arranges for them to work for fellow mob boss Andy Hunter (Michael Higgs) – whom Jake and Danny have already made an enemy off after stealing his car, before Jake punches Andy for badmouthing Danny. A partnership is soon established between Andy and Johnny, which quickly gets out of hand as Danny continues to cause trouble – forcing Jake to fix up the damage his brother is causing. When Johnny plans on retiring from his life of crime, he authorizes Jake to act out as Andy's representative for an upcoming trade exchange; however, he later puts Jake out of the exchange, upon deducing Andy's plan to con him out of £750,000 – which prompts Andy to employ Danny as his representative, instead; Danny agrees to help Andy, so that he could relish in watching Johnny getting outdone, but Andy betrays him shortly after the deal is secured. However, Johnny has arranged for Andy's bodyguard Eddie to bring Andy before him and prepares for Jake to intercept Andy. When Andy awaits for Eddie's return from the toilets in his car, Jake turns up to reclaim the £750,000 from Andy before Johnny appears – requesting he and Andy have a "conversation". Jake then witnesses the two mobsters seemingly parting ways, but is shocked to end up seeing Johnny thrust Andy off the flyover – killing him; Jake then drives Johnny back to Walford as the police arrive at the scene of where Andy was murdered.

Jake struggles to cope with observing Andy's murder and ends up sharing the information to Danny as the latter, who had recently learned of Andy's death, grows paranoid in fear that Johnny will come after them next. In July 2005, Jake and Danny plan to leave Walford after Danny sets fire to Johnny's house. Whilst Jake is saying goodbye to Chrissie Watts (Tracy-Ann Oberman), Johnny forces Danny into his car. He gives Jake a chance to leave, but Jake gets into the car to stay with Danny. Johnny drives them to a forest and locks Jake in the car as he prepares to shoot Danny; however, Jake kicks the car window out and escapes into the woods to find them. He tries to persuade Johnny not to kill Danny. The episode ends with Johnny raising the gun at both of them; however, their fate is not revealed until a few months later when Jake turns up, where it turns out that Johnny let them go – under the agreement that they were not seen again.

Jake returns to Walford and informs Johnny that he will not be starting trouble, as he is there for personal reasons; Johnny allows him to stay. Jake soon repairs his relationship with Chrissie – whom he recently had a fling with – and is later shocked when she admits to have killed her husband and Johnny's close friend, Den (Leslie Grantham) – whose body had been uncovered from the cellar of The Queen Victoria pub, several weeks before; Jake is further surprised to learn that Chrissie killed Den on the same night that Johnny murdered Andy – as well as framing her nemesis Sam Mitchell (Kim Medcalf) for the crime. By the time Johnny and several other residents are doubting Chrissie's innocence, Jake joins her quest to leave Walford and quickly creates a partnership between Chrissie and Johnny with the intent of helping her sell The Queen Vic to tie up her loose ends – as well as his own in the terms of making amends with his ex-crime boss; however, they are both unaware that the confession was caught on CCTV at Johnny's club Scarlet. Chrissie ends up getting arrested as she and Jake are at the airport, ready to flee abroad. Chrissie is remanded in prison pending her trial, but Jake promises never to ditch Chrissie and he proposes marriage to her. Chrissie tells Jake that she does not want Jake to put his life on hold for all the years that she will be in prison. She tells him she is going to plead guilty to the murder and let Jake go. She makes him promise that he will never visit her again.

Sometime later, Jake discovers Danny has been living in Johnny's mansion in Essex. He manages to locate Danny and tries to persuade him to return to Walford together, but Danny says Johnny's home is also his home now. Jake realises Danny has become mentally unstable since his time away from Walford, and that Johnny is just using him to do his dirty work. Danny then reveals that he owes Johnny a favor, and in order to gain his approval, he had to do something. Danny then shows Jake a mobile phone recording of Andy's best-friend, Dennis Rickman (Nigel Harman), being stabbed to death on New Year's Eve 2005. Jake is shocked when he realizes Danny had killed Dennis on Johnny's orders. Jake confronts Danny for his recklessness, prompting the latter to threaten him with a pistol; the pair end up having a fight when Jack punches Danny, only for his younger brother to then knock him unconscious. Jake regains consciousness just as Sam's brothers Phil (Steve McFadden) and Grant (Ross Kemp) arrive to confront Johnny – seeking to bring him to justice for Dennis' murder as they had promised to their ex-lover Sharon (Letitia Dean), who recently married Dennis months before his death. However, Johnny ends up capturing the brothers and orders Danny to kill them. Danny prepares to kill Grant with a shotgun, but just as he is about to pull the trigger, Jake intervenes with Danny's pistol – which he dropped during the earlier struggle between them – and shoots his younger brother in a desperate attempt to stop him. Though he intended to wound Danny by shooting him in the arm or the leg, Jake had killed his brother when Grant confirms that Danny is dead. As Phil and Grant leave to confront Johnny again, Jake mourns the loss of his brother and proceeds to bury Danny in the woods with a spade – which he then uses to mark his grave. Jake then notices Johnny calling Danny on his phone, and answers the call – indirectly telling Johnny about Danny's death whilst also stating that Phil and Grant are still alive; Johnny would later get arrested for the murders of Andy and Dennis. Following Johnny's arrest, Jake takes his daughter Ruby (Louisa Lytton) back with him to Walford and looks after her.

As Jake copes with the events of Danny's death and Johnny's arrest, he forms a relationship with Carly Wicks (Kellie Shirley); however, he ends it in August 2006. Jake soon becomes concerned for Ruby when she begins dating Sean Slater (Robert Kazinsky), the brother of Ruby's best-friend Stacey (Lacey Turner). He rightly guesses that Sean is using Ruby, and is only interested in her money. Jake and Sean become bitter enemies, but Sean convinces Ruby that he loves her and that Jake is trying to cause trouble between them. Ruby even tells Sean that it was Jake who had murdered Danny – giving Sean a hold over Jake. In October 2006, Jake turns to Johnny – who has been paying Jake to look after Ruby, since he has been in prison – and tells him what Sean is doing. When Johnny arranges for Sean to visit him in prison, Sean ignores his threats to stay away from Ruby and tells Johnny that there is nothing that he or Jake can do to stop him. Johnny attempts to phone Jake to order him to kill Sean, but he has a heart attack before he can dial and only manages to whisper "Jake...kill him for me" – mistakenly thinking he is speaking to Jake. Johnny's cellmate assumes that Johnny wants Jake killed, and Johnny dies soon after in hospital. Jake later decides to leave Walford, but as he walks out of Albert Square, he is confronted by a stranger – who asks if he is Jake Moon.

=== 2024 ===
Nearly 18 years later, it is revealed that he survived the confrontation. Jake reunites with Chrissie after her release from prison, and after a brief stop in Albert Square to reminisce, they drive away for a new life together.

=== 2026 ===
Jake visits Zoe Slater (Michelle Ryan) to discover whether Chrissie was involved in the murder of Anthony Trueman (Nicholas Bailey). Zoe pleads with Jake to help her find Chrissie. However, Jake leaves. Later, Kat Slater (Jessie Wallace) and Vicki Fowler (Alice Haig) track him down to convince him to reunite with Alfie. He then reveals to Alfie that, after being confronted by the hitmen in 2006, Jake went into hiding. Jake meets Alfie's kids and pays a visit to Phil, who reaffirms his gratitude to Jake for saving him and Grant from Danny. Jake reveals that he thinks about Danny all the time and Phil advises him to start doing right by the family he still has. Jake agrees to help Kat and Alfie find Chrissie. She returns and exposes Anthony and Zoe's daughter, Jasmine Fisher (Indeyarna Donaldson-Holness) to be Anthony's true killer. Afterwards, Chrissie threatens to phone the police about Jake killing Danny. However, Jake convinces her not to and proposes to Chrissie, which she accepts. Jake and Chrissie leave once again, as the police arrive to arrest Jasmine for Anthony's murder.

== Reception ==
Regarding his 2024 return, Laura-Jayne Tyler from Inside Soap joked, "So, Jake Moon has been waiting 19 years to get his hands on Chrissie? Clearly the sign of a man who doesn't know how to work Tinder."
