= Andy Hunter (EastEnders) =

Fictional character from the BBC soap opera EastEnders

- EastEnders character
- Portrayed by: Michael Higgs
- Duration: 2003–2005
- First appearance: Episode 2545; 3 July 2003
- Last appearance: Episode 2892; 18 February 2005
- Created by: Louise Berridge
In-universe information
- Occupation: Gangster; Businessman; Bookmaker
- Wife: Bev Hunter (backstory); Sam Mitchell (2004–2005)

Andy Hunter is a fictional character from the BBC soap opera EastEnders, played by Michael Higgs. He first appeared in the episode broadcast in the United Kingdom on 3 July 2003 and, following the murder of his gangland boss Jack Dalton (Hywel Bennett), became the show's main antagonist up until the character was axed and killed off in the series' 20th Anniversary episode, shown on 18 February 2005.

The character's story arc began with Andy taking over Dalton's position as the leader of his criminal organization, The Firm, and becoming the newly established crime kingpin of Walford in the borough's local community named Albert Square. Soon afterwards, Andy went on to develop a mutual friendship with Dalton's protege-turned-killer Dennis Rickman (Nigel Harman); establish a relationship with local wayward Kat Slater (Jessie Wallace), which led to the pair having a wedding that ended with Kat jilting Andy in favor of his love rival Alfie Moon (Shane Richie); repetitively clash with Dennis' girlfriend and Kat's daughter Zoe (Michelle Ryan) after he blackmails her mother into sleeping with him to get revenge on Alfie; humiliate Dennis' illegitimate father Den Watts (Leslie Grantham) after defeating him in a high-stakes poker game and then exposing his antics to his adopted daughter Sharon (Letitia Dean); feign a romance and subsequent marriage with Kat's best-friend Sam Mitchell (Kim Medcalf) in order to extract control of her family empire; instigate a feud with Sam's cousin Billy (Perry Fenwick) after the latter attempts to warn Sam's mother, Peggy (Barbara Windsor), about his scheme to exploit her financial interests; arrange for Billy's companion Minty Peterson (Cliff Parisi) to get beaten up over his romantic feelings for Sam; build an unlikely friendship with his secretary Pat Evans (Pam St Clement); organize the death of employee Paul Trueman (Gary Beadle) in retribution for attempting to entrap Andy into a police sting operation over his criminal activities; spark a conflict with Paul's adopted father, Patrick (Rudolph Walker), after the latter discovers the truth about his son's fate; and became enemies with Alfie's two cousins, Jake (Joel Beckett) and Danny (Jake Maskall), after having Alfie's grandmother Nana (Hilda Braid) attacked in retaliation for the pair stealing his car and later assaulting him.

Eventually, Andy's villainous reign reached its conclusion towards the show's 20th anniversary episode — when Jake and Danny's mob boss, Johnny Allen (Billy Murray), arrived on the square and proceeded to usurp his position as both the square's reigning top dog and Walford's undisputed crime kingpin. In response to this, Andy planned to con £750,000 from Johnny during a criminal transaction between them. However, his plan failed when Andy was betrayed by his henchman Eddie (Daren Elliott Holmes) — who alerted Johnny of his plans to get one over him. This ultimately led to Johnny killing Andy by throwing him off a motorway bridge, thus ending the character's time on the programme.

== Creation and development ==
=== Casting and characterisation ===
Higgs auditioned for the role in April 2003 and won the part of EastEnders' new "bad guy", who made his first appearance in July that year as a member of the gangster organisation known as The Firm. Higgs stated that he was happy to play a villain: "They say that the devil has the best tunes, but the main thing is that the character's fully-rounded. With the so-called good guys and bad guys, they're not just good or just bad. There's a dynamic, and that's always the interesting thing to find - where's the weakness? You flesh it out and make them an interesting person."

In the hierarchy of the Firm, Andy's character was a subordinate to Jack Dalton (Hywel Bennett), but was appointed leader of the organisation for a brief time following Dalton's murder. Higgs described the differences between Andy and Dalton's leadership styles: "He's new blood, but he has a completely different sensibility about how the gang operates. Jack Dalton was quite old school. If you upset him you'd get your knee-caps broken or get killed. I think Andy plays more of a psychological game - information is power for him."

Discussing Andy's relationship with Kat Slater (Jessie Wallace), Higgs said, "I think you do see a soft side of him with Kat. He's totally in love with her, which makes him very vulnerable. He's been married before, but the marriage didn't work out. You get the sense that there's some hurt there, some pain that's stopped him becoming involved with other women [...] he likes the spirit of her. She's no-nonsense, in-your-face and slightly larger than life. Andy likes that scared of no one approach. Kat reminds Andy of his mum, with her dark hair and feistiness. He likes the fact that she's a family girl - that's what he wants."

=== Departure and death ===
On 18 November 2004 it was announced that actor Michael Higgs had been axed from his role as Andy Hunter and that his last scenes would be screened in Easter 2005. Higgs' axing from the role came following the decisions to axe fellow cast members Jill Halfpenny and Leslie Grantham. A BBC spokesperson stated, "We thank Michael for all his hard work." It was speculated that the decision to have Higgs written out of the show was to make way for the introduction of Billy Murray as Johnny Allen, who critics stated made Andy "look like small fry". In an interview on Today with Des and Mel in February 2005 Higgs hinted that his character would be killed off. He made his final appearance as Andy Hunter on 18 February 2005, when his character was murdered by Johnny. Leslie Grantham's final scenes as Den Watts were screened the same night as Andy's departure.

== Storylines ==
Andy is an employee of "The Firm", of which he takes control after the murder of Jack Dalton (Hywel Bennett) by Dennis Rickman (Nigel Harman). He had previously been married and divorced to a woman named Bev. He is attracted to Kat Slater (Jessie Wallace), and asks her out on a date in The Queen Victoria pub, but she harshly turns him down. However he keeps trying and she eventually accepts his advances; and after some weeks he falls in love with Kat. He proposes to her while they were in New York and she accepts. On their wedding day, Alfie Moon (Shane Richie) runs into the church and says he loves her and Kat leaves Andy for Alfie thus making Andy and Alfie enemies. However Andy gets his revenge as Alfie owes him a large amount of money. Andy blackmails Kat to have sex with him behind Alfie's back, in order to pay off the money and if she refuses, he says he will have Alfie killed. Alfie manages to provide the money, but only after Kat has already slept with Andy. When they are in bed together, Andy secretly films everything with a hidden video camera he sets up, and gives the tape to Alfie.

Alfie later watches the tape out of curiosity and is heartbroken at what he sees, and confronts Kat about it, nearly ending their relationship. Andy hopes for them to split but he doesn't succeed as Alfie and Kat are still going strong, and Alfie also gets his revenge by giving Andy a tape thinking that it is the same tape that Andy sent him. However, as Andy starts to watch it, he is taken aback as he discovers it is a different tape of Alfie and Kat's wedding. After that, Andy leaves them to their relationship but still bullies Alfie. Andy starts having a relationship with Sam Mitchell (Kim Medcalf), and he later marries her. However, when Den Watts (Leslie Grantham) and Marcus Christie (Stephen Churchett) trick Sam into selling the pub to Den, and signing her house over to Andy, Andy leaves her, taking Sam for every penny she has and leaving her homeless.

In 2004, Paul Trueman (Gary Beadle) reports Andy to the police for his criminal activities. Andy takes his revenge on Paul by hiring a hitman from The Firm to kill him. Paul is killed in December 2004. Paul's father, Patrick Trueman (Rudolph Walker) begins searching for him and identifies his body when it is recovered. Patrick soon discovers that Andy is involved with Paul's death. Andy tells his employee Pat Evans (Pam St Clement) that he had hired a hitman to kill Paul and threatens to kill her if she says anything. Patrick tells the police that Andy is involved but there is no evidence against him. Patrick later swears revenge against him.

Andy's luck finally runs out when he tries to con Johnny Allen (Billy Murray) out of £750,000. Johnny pushes him off a motorway footbridge, killing him instantly. The police are informed of Andy's death but decide that it was a suicide. He dies on the same night that Den is bludgeoned to death by his wife Chrissie (Tracy-Ann Oberman). Sam is asked to attend Andy's will reading, expecting to get all of his money and assets. However, Andy leaves the house to Pat Evans and the bookmakers to Dennis, leaving Sam with just his wedding ring, "so she can sell it, get her roots done and still be the dumbest blonde I ever knew." 13 months after his death, Johnny confesses to Andy's murder to the police in March 2006, along with ordering the murder of Dennis.

== Reception ==
In 2020, Sara Wallis and Ian Hyland from The Daily Mirror placed Andy 99th on their ranked list of the Best 100 EastEnders characters of all time, calling him "Walford's criminal kingpin". In February 2025, Radio Times ranked Andy as the 13th best EastEnders villain.

== See also ==
- List of soap opera villains
- List of fictional crime bosses
