= Jake Maskall =

English actor

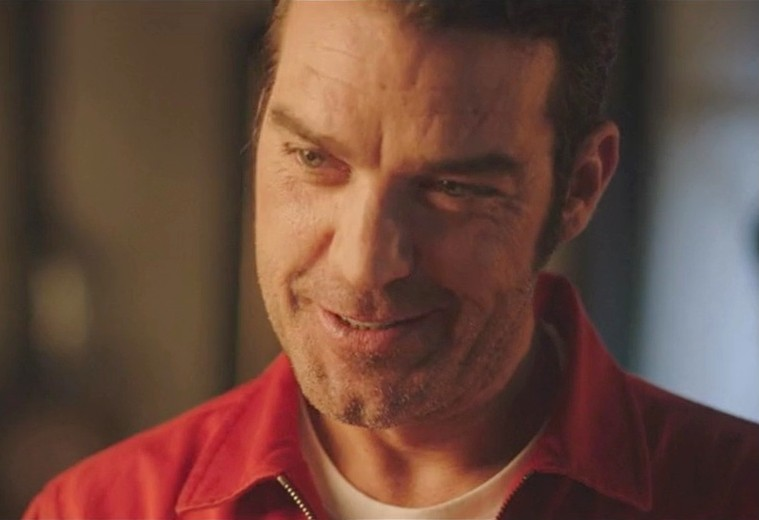
- Maskall in Who's the Daddy, 2019 short film
- Born: 17 April 1971 (age 54); Essex, England
- Occupation: Actor
- Years active: 2002–2019

Jake Maskall is an English actor. Working predominantly in theatre, his screen credits include Casualty (2002), Murder City (2004), EastEnders (2004-2006), Beyond the Rave (2008), and The Tudors (2009). He is most notable for playing Prince Cyrus Henstridge for 40 episodes (4 series) of the royalty drama series The Royals (2015-2018).

== Life and career ==
Maskall was born on 17 April 1971 in Essex, England.

He guest starred in Casualty (2002) as Paul Vessey and Scobie in Murder City (2004).

Maskall's most notable role came in the BBC television soap opera EastEnders (2004–2006), in which he played ladies' man and bad boy Danny Moon. His character first appeared on 30 December 2004 and was driven out of the show by gangster Johnny Allen seven months later. He returned for a brief stint in March 2006, when the character was killed off by brother Jake Moon (Joel Beckett) after it was revealed he had killed Dennis Rickman under Johnny Allen's orders.

In March 2006, he toured the UK playing the lead character, Louis Mazzini, in Kind Hearts and Coronets. In May 2006, he played Aeneas in Dido (Queen of Carthage) for Angels in the Architecture at the Chapel of St Barnabas in Soho. This production was then revived at Kensington Palace in 2008. In summer 2006, Maskall starred alongside ex-EastEnder Michael Greco in the independent thriller film Naked in London. In November 2006, he starred as Mephistopheles in a modern adaptation of Doctor Faustus by Christopher Marlowe.

In 2008, he appeared in the Hammer House horror film serial Beyond the Rave (2008). In 2009, he appeared as Sir Henry Pole for a single episode of the Showtime series The Tudors (2009).

In 2010, he appeared in Much Ado About Nothing in Chester's Grosvenor Park.

He starred as Prince Cyrus Henstridge (alongside Elizabeth Hurley) for 40 episodes in four series of the drama series The Royals (2015–2018).

== Personal life ==
In a 2005 interview with Now, while he was still working on EastEnders, Maskall revealed that he was gay, and that he'd been in a relationship for 12 years, saying "it's not a secret".

== Filmography ==
- Casualty (2002) – Paul Vesey
- Murder City (2004) – Alan Scobie
- EastEnders – Danny Moon (2004–2005, 2006) (76 episodes)
- Naked in London (2006) – Mark Tierney
- Moving Target (2011) – Jonathan Porchester
- Beyond the Rave (2008) – Strigoi
- Rather You Than Me (2008) – Don
- Feral (2009)
- The Tudors – Lord Montague
- Centurion (2010) – Roman Officer Argos
- The Adored (2012) – Adrian
- The Royals (2015–2018) – King Cyrus Henstridge
