= Now (1996–2019 magazine) =

British weekly entertainment magazine

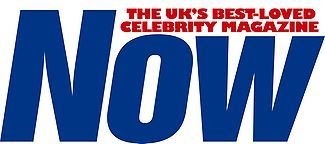
- Frequency: Weekly
- Total circulation: 126,921 (ABC Jul – Dec 2015); Print and digital editions. (2015)
- First issue: Late 1996
- Final issue: 2 April 2019
- Company: TI Media
- Country: United Kingdom
- Language: English

NOW was a British weekly entertainment magazine printed between 1996 and 2019.

== History and profile ==
NOW was launched in late 1996 as a less serious, more gossip-oriented magazine aimed at women. A series of high-profile celebrity relationships, such as between David and Victoria Beckham, and Jennifer Aniston and Brad Pitt provided ample material, while reality shows such as Big Brother and Pop Idol grew popular at just the right time to help fill pages. NOW was published by TI Media.

It was a mix of celebrity news, gossip and fashion and was primarily aimed at women. It also featured movie and music reviews, real-life stories, shopping and style feature together with major celebrity interviews.

The magazine had a circulation of 196,726 copies in the second part of 2013. Now's circulation fell to 126,921 in the second half of 2015.

By 2019, circulation had fallen for five years in a row and the decision was taken to close the magazine on 2 April 2019. The associated celebsnow.co.uk website continues.
