= Billy Murray (actor) =

English actor (born 1941)

- Born: William Albert Murray; 6 October 1941 (age 85); Forest Gate, Essex, England
- Education: East 15 Acting School
- Occupation: Actor
- Years active: 1963–present
- Spouse(s): Maureen (m. 1967; div. 1996) Elaine Hoyer (m. 1998)
- Children: 4, including Jaime Murray

William Albert Murray (born 6 October 1941) is an English actor, best known for playing Don Beech in The Bill from 1995 to 2004, Captain John Price in the video games Call of Duty 4: Modern Warfare, Call of Duty: Modern Warfare 2, and Call of Duty: Modern Warfare 3 and Johnny Allen in the BBC soap opera EastEnders from 2005 to 2006.

Often known for portraying "hard man" characters, he has also starred in McVicar (1980), Essex Boys (2000), One in the Chamber (2012), We Still Steal the Old Way (2016), Nemesis (2021) and the Rise of the Footsoldier film series (2007–2021).

== Early life ==
Murray was born in Forest Gate, Essex and grew up in Upton Park, east London, one of three children of Timothy and Vera Murray; his father was a plasterer, nightclub bouncer and a boxing champion. Murray attended St. Edward's Catholic Primary and St Bonaventure's Catholic School. After leaving school at fourteen, Murray worked as a shelf-stacker at a Co-Op supermarket in Canning Town and at the local docks cleaning the dirt out of oil tankers. He also had football trials for West Ham United and boxed for the Reggie and Ronnie Kray-owned West Ham Boxing Club. Murray became good friends with the Krays to the extent that he accompanied them on holiday to Spain. The Kray twins paid £400 for him to go to East 15 Acting School as a teenager, because they "liked his attitude". They never asked for the money back, and Murray later appeared as a character witness for Charlie Kray who had been accused of smuggling cocaine.

== Career ==
Murray made his acting debut playing a minor uncredited role in the 1963 film The Wrong Arm of the Law, followed by minor uncredited roles in What a Crazy World (1963) and Two Left Feet (1965). He started playing larger roles in the films Poor Cow (1967), Corruption (1968), Up the Junction (1968) and Performance (1970). From the 1970s through to the early 1990s, he made appearances in a wide variety of television series such as Softly, Softly, The Sweeney, The Professionals, Minder, Bergerac and Casualty. He was also among those considered for the role of Derek "Del Boy" Trotter in the BBC TV series Only Fools and Horses before it finally went to David Jason. Other notable film roles include the role of Joey in the hit 1980 film McVicar (1980).

In 1995, he took on the role of DS Don Beech in the ITV police drama series The Bill appearing as a regular cast member from early 1995 to late 2000. This was his second role in the series, as he had previously appeared in an episode as DI Jackson in 1989. In 2001, he reprised the role in a special episode entitled "Beech on the Run". This was followed by the six-part mini-series Beech is Back. In 2004, he made his final appearance as Beech for a guest stint in five episodes, in which his character escaped from prison and is now back 'on the run'.

In late 2004, he joined the cast of BBC soap opera EastEnders and played gangland figure Johnny Allen. This was Murray's second role within the series, as he previously appeared as loan shark Mr. X for four episodes in 1991. Murray's character as Johnny Allen made his first appearance on 4 January 2005, and became the show's main antagonist upon terrorizing numerous characters on the programme - including Peggy Mitchell; her sons Phil Mitchell and Grant Mitchell; their cousin Billy Mitchell, whom Johnny initially employed in his criminal empire; Phil and Grant's ex-lover Sharon Watts; her godmother Pauline Fowler; his daughter's best friend Stacey Slater; and even his own henchman Jake Moon. During his time on the show, Johnny killed fellow mob boss Andy Hunter on the show's 20th anniversary episode by throwing him from a motorway bridge. His character later arranged for Jake's brother Danny Moon to kill Sharon's husband Dennis Rickman on New Year's Eve 2005. He departed from the show in March 2006 when his character was jailed after his daughter Ruby Allen forced him to confess to having Dennis murdered and killing Andy himself. He made a brief return to EastEnders in October 2006 when his character was killed off after he succumbed to a heart attack in prison, though not before trying to arrange the death of Ruby's boyfriend and Stacey's brother Sean Slater upon learning that he plans to extract her family assets. For his performance as Johnny Allen Murray won the 'Best Villain' award at the British Soap Awards in May 2006.

Following his departure from EastEnders, Murray appeared in several British films such as Rollin' with the Nines (2006), Doghouse (2009) and Dead Cert (2010). He also played Mickey Steele in three films from the Rise of the Footsoldier film series, those being Rise of the Footsoldier (2007), Rise of the Footsoldier 3: The Pat Tate Story (2017) and Rise of the Footsoldier: Origins (2021).

He also provided the voice of Captain John Price in the video games Call of Duty 4: Modern Warfare (2007), Call of Duty: Modern Warfare 2 (2009) and Call of Duty: Modern Warfare 3 (2011) and fronted the adverts for Injury Lawyers 4 U, a compensation claims company in the UK.

Murray's later career has mainly consisted of film roles, including The Rise and Fall of a White Collar Hooligan (2012), One in the Chamber (2012) and We Still Steal the Old Way (2016). He headlined the crime film Nemesis (2021) and starred alongside Lee Majors, Danny Trejo and Ian Ogilvy in the action-thriller film Renegades (2022).

== Personal life ==
Murray has four children. A son and daughter from his first marriage to Maureen, and two daughters from his second marriage to Elaine. Jaime Murray, one of his daughters from his second marriage is an actress who is best known for starring in the television series Hustle, as well as playing Lila Tournay in season two of Dexter.

In 1998, Murray appeared in court after he and three other men allegedly attacked two men who they believed were supplying drugs to their daughters. Murray said that he suffered a nervous breakdown and slept rough on the set of The Bill for months as a court order banned him from living in his home county of Essex after he was charged with intimidating a witness involved in the case. He also admitted that the court case had put a strain on his marriage. Murray was cleared of assault, having claimed that at the time he was "suffering from a mouth abscess and a cracked collarbone and was in no condition to hit anyone". One of the men attacked was quoted as saying that they wished the case had never gone to court, stating "I deserved everything I got". In June of that year, his daughter Lizzie almost committed suicide via overdose. She survived and Murray was assured her life wasn't in any danger.

In April 2011, it was reported that Murray had been charged with assault of his wife and daughter. In July 2011, it was confirmed that the assault case against Murray had been dropped.

Outside of acting, Murray is involved in property investment and owns and rents out lock-ups, flats and garages across east London.

He is a West Ham United football club fan, and a supporter of the Conservative Party.

== Filmography ==
=== Film ===
Year	Title	Character	Notes
1963	The Wrong Arm of the Law	Crook at Syndicate Meeting	Uncredited
1963	What a Crazy World	Youth at Dance	Uncredited
1965	Two Left Feet	Gang Member	Uncredited
1967	Poor Cow	Tom's mate	
1968	Up the Junction	Ray	
1968	Corruption	Rik	
1970	Performance	Thug	
1980	McVicar	Joey Davis	
1991	Buddy's Song	Harry	
2000	Essex Boys	Perry Elley	
2004	One Man and His Dog	D.C. Stevens	
2005	Hell to Pay	Larry Malone	
2006	Rollin' with the Nines	David Brumby	
2007	Rise of the Footsoldier	Mickey Steele	
2009	Doghouse	Colonel	
2010	Just for the Record	Wilson Barnes	
2010	Dead Cert	Dante Livenko	
2010	Stalker	Robert	
2010	Freight	Gabe Taylor	
2010	The Rapture	DI Bowden	
2011	How to Stop Being a Loser	Dr. Leaner	
2012	Strippers vs Werewolves	Jack Ferris	
2012	The Rise and Fall of a White Collar Hooligan	Mr. Robinson	
2012	One in the Chamber	Leo Crosby	
2012	Acceptance	Eric	
2012	Airborne	Cutter	
2013	Essex Boys Retribution	Prisoner	
2014	What's the Score?	The Producer	
2014	The Disappearance of Lenka Wood	Draper	
2016	We Still Steal the Old Way	Vic Farrow	
2017	Rise of the Footsoldier 3: The Pat Tate Story	Mickey Steele	
2020	Vengeance	Eric	
2021	Nemesis	John Morgan	
2021	Rise of the Footsoldier: Origins	Mickey Steele	
2022	Renegades	Woody	

=== Television ===
Year	Title	Character	Notes
1967	Vendetta	Corsican Rebel	Episode: "The Revolutionary Man"
1967	Trapped	Gerry	Episode: "Trapped: Au Pair Swedish Style"
1969	ITV Sunday Night Theatre	Eric	Episode: "Steve"
1969	The Root of All Evil?	Terry Milward	Episode: "The Long Sixpence"
1970	A Family at War	Corporal Dewey	Episode: "The Breach in the Dyke"
1970	Menace	Luke	Episode: "The Elimination"
1971	ITV Sunday Night Theatre	Jim	Episode: "The Silver Collection"
1971	Softly, Softly: Task Force	Georgie Benson	Episode: "Better Than Doing Porridge"
1972	ITV Sunday Night Theatre	Welder	Episode: "Time Lock"
1972	New Scotland Yard	George Read	Episode: "The Wrong-Un"
1973	Barlow	Culver	Episode: "Informant"
1973	Two Women	Clorindo	Episode: #1.4
1973	Marked Personal	Don Bannion	2 episodes
1974	New Scotland Yard	Charlie Palmer	Episode: "All That Glitters"
1975	The Sweeney	Brian Cooney	Episode: "Stoppo Driver"
1975	Suzi's Plan	Bert	Television film
1976	Rock Follies	Spike	6 episodes
1976	Barney's Last Battle	Les Palmer	Television film
1977	Target	Rex Adcock	Episode: "Roadrunner"
1977	Rock Follies of '77	Spike	5 episodes
1979	Hazell	Big Dave Castle	Episode: "Hazell Gets the Boot"
1979	Kids	Dave Buckley	Episode: "Laurie"
1979	The Professionals	Morgan	Episode: "Runner"
1981	Honky Tonk Heroes	Dennis	Episode: "It's Only Make Believe"
1981	Private Schulz	Fred	Episode: #1.6
1982	Saturday Night Thriller	Bernie	Episode: "Grass"
1983	Jemima Shore Investigates	Billy Standen	Episode: "A Promising Death"
1984	Crown Court	Det. Insp. Minshull	Episode: "Whisper Who Dares: Part 1"
1984	Missing from Home	Chief Insp. Marsden	Episode: #1.1
1984	Letty	Eddie Waite	2 episodes
1985	Dempsey and Makepeace	Billy Kennaway	Episode: "The Hit"
1984–1989	Minder	Charlie Pope Mick	2 episodes
1989–1990	The Bill	DI Jackman	2 episodes
1991	Bergerac	John Kelp	Episode: "The Lohans"
1991	EastEnders	Mr. X	3 episodes
1992	Casualty	Don Collins	Episode: "Cascade"
1992	The Ruth Rendell Mysteries	Gunner Jones	Episode: "Kissing the Gunner's Daughter: Part One"
1995	A Touch of Frost	Bill Boxley	Episode: "No Refuge"
1995–2004	The Bill	DS Don Beech	186 episodes
2000	ITV Panto: Aladdin	Police Chief	Television film
2001	Beech is Back	DS Don Beech	6 episodes
2004	Doctors	Larry Baker	Episode: "My Stepmother the Alien"
2005–2006	EastEnders	Johnny Allen	144 episodes
2007	The Grey Man	George Rowlands	Television film
2017	Ransom's Law	Ewan Ransom	6 episodes

=== Video games ===
Year	Title	Character	Notes
2007	Call of Duty 4: Modern Warfare	Captain John Price	Voice
2009	Call of Duty: Modern Warfare 2	Captain John Price	Voice
2011	Call of Duty: Modern Warfare 3	Captain John Price	Voice
2023	Rise of the Footsoldier: The Mobile Game	Narrator	Voice
