= Michael Higgs =

British actor (born 1962)

- Born: 14 February 1962 (age 64); Birmingham, England
- Occupation: Actor
- Years active: 1989–present
- Spouse: Caroline Catz (m. 2007)
- Children: 2

Michael Higgs (born 14 February 1962) is an English actor best known for prominent roles in two long-running television series: Eddie Santini in ITV1's The Bill, and Andy Hunter in the BBC soap opera EastEnders, in addition to an 8-episode stretch as Dr. Thomas Waugh in Bad Girls.

In 2012–2014, Higgs played Michael Clarke in the BBC sci-fi fantasy series Wizards vs Aliens.

== Personal life ==
Higgs is married to actress Caroline Catz, whom he met on the set of The Bill. They have a son born in 2001 and a daughter who was born in 2006.

== Filmography ==
=== Film ===
Year	Film	Role	Notes
1999	Notting Hill	Man at Market	Uncredited role
2000	Wilfred	Wilfred Owen	Short film
2000	Relative Values	Film Director	
2001	All Forgotten	Vasya	
2004	Deadlines	Wilmington Journal	
2004	The Lodge	Alex	Short film
2011	Assassination Games	Godfrey	
2011	Fetch!	Luca	Short film
2011	The Shoelace	Man Arriving	Short video
2013	Beat Girl	Tom	
2013	L'Assenza	Piero	Short film
2013	Prisoners of the Sun	Peter Levitz	
2013	Land of Giants	Looter	Short film
2016	Letters from Baghdad	General Sir Gilbert Clayton	Documentary film
2017	Amoc	Colin	
2018	The Marine 6: Close Quarters	Graham Torrence	
2019	Avengement	Mr. Norton	
2020	Delia Derbyshire: The Myths and Legendary Tapes	The Men Behind Desks	Documentary film
2021	Dark Ditties Presents 'Dad'	Dr. Edward Brunner	
2021	Code of Silence	Du Rose	
2021	Dark Ditties Presents 'Stained'	Dr. Edward Brunner	
2022	Wilfred 2022	Wilfred Owen	Short film
2023	The Three Musketeers	Jussac	
TBA	Benoit	Dr. Edward Brunner	In production
TBA	Black Angel	King Luther	Pre-production

=== Television ===
Year	Show	Role	Notes
1991	Chalkface	Paul Moon	Series regular; Episodes 1–10
1993	EastEnders	Sean	2 episodes
1993	Between the Lines	Det. Sgt. Luke	Series 2; Episode 10: "What's the Strength of This?"
1998–2000	The Bill	P.C. Eddie Santini	Series 14–16 (60 episodes)
2001	Agatha Christie's Poirot	Patrick Redfern	Series 8; Episode 1: "Evil Under the Sun"
2001	Bad Girls	Dr. Thomas Waugh	Recurring role; Series 3 (8 episodes)
2003–2005	EastEnders	Andy Hunter	Series regular; 177 episodes
2006	Eros Unleashed	Phillip	Television film
2006	Double Time	Barry	Television film
2008	Silent Witness	Inspector Russell King	Series 12; Episodes 5 & 6: "Terror: Parts 1 & 2"
2009	Trinity	Dr. Gabriel Lloyd	Episodes 1–8
2010	Casualty	Jack Greenwood	Series 25; Episode 1: "Entry Wounds"
2010	Material Girl	Scott	Episode 2
2010	Identity	Malcolm Calshaw	Episode 2: "Chelsea Girl"
2011	Frankenstein's Wedding... Live in Leeds	Detective	Television film
2012–2014	Wizards vs Aliens	Michael Clarke	Series 1–3 (33 episodes)
2014	WPC 56	Lenny Powell	Series 2; Episodes 1–5
2015	New Tricks	Mikey Bishop	Series 12; Episode 6: "The Fame Game"
2015	Midsomer Murders	Butch Nevins	Series 18; Episode 6: "Harvest of Souls"
2016	Hetty Feather	Mr. McCartney	Series 2; Episode 2: "The Haunting"
2016	We the Jury	Bradley the Lawyer	Pilot episode
2016	Casualty	Henry Nichols	Series 31; Episode 6: "Party Pooper"
2017	Broken	Senior Police Officer	Episode 3: "Andrew"
2019	The Feed	Alec	Episode 10
2020	Pan Tau	King	Episodes 1 & 2: "Fantasy Novel: Parts 1 & 2"
2021	Whitstable Pearl	Frank Matheson	Series 1; Episode 1: "The Free Waters"
2022	Sister Boniface Mysteries	Dick Lansky	Series 1; Episode 2: "Lights, Camera, Murder!"
2022	Agatha Raisin	George Selby	Series 4; Episode 3: "A Spoonful of Poison"
2024	Shetland	Rob Harding	Series 9; Episodes 4 & 5
TBA	A Study in Red Trilogy	Robert Cavendish	Mini-series. Pre-production

=== Stage ===
Year	Production	Role	Notes
1989	Veterans Day	Actor	
1996	The Woman in Black	Actor	
1997	Measure for Measure	Angelo	
1997	A Midsummer Night's Dream	Demetrius	
1997	All's Well That Ends Well	Bertram	
1999	One Life and Counting	Aaron	
2000	The Blue Room	Various roles	
2002	The Homecoming	Teddy	
2018	Broken Glass	Harry	

=== Video games ===
Year	Production	Role	Notes
2009	Risen	Sam / Cole / Cyrus (voice)	English version
2010	Kinect Sports	(Additional voices)	English version
