= Joel Beckett =

British actor

- Born: Joel Bygraves; 27 November 1973 (age 52); Potton, Bedfordshire, England
- Occupation: Actor
- Years active: 1996–present

Joel Beckett (born Joel Bygraves; 27 November 1973) is an English actor, known for playing Jake Moon in the BBC soap opera EastEnders and as Lee in the original version of the comedy series The Office. Born in Potton, Bedfordshire, he was educated at Bedford School. He also appeared in other television series such as Holby City and Band of Brothers. In 2005 he appeared in the film Green Street as a pub landlord.

== Filmography ==
=== Film ===
Year	Film	Role	Notes
1998	Underground	Des	
2005	Green Street	Terry	
2009	Christmas Time	Terry	Short film
2009	Eve	Tom/Liam	
2009	Piccadilly High Noon	Cowboy	Short film
2010	Spoiler	Specials FX Guy	Short film
2010	The Big I Am	Johnny	
2011	What's the 48?	Motorcycle Rider	Short film
2014	Snow in Paradise	Kenny	
2015	Dough	PC O'Neill	
2017	6 Days	Policeman #2	
2018	The Snarling	Bruce (Film Director)	
2021	Hunting Bears	Andy	Short film

=== Television ===
Year	Show	Role	Notes
1996	The Bill	Andy Collier	1 episode: "Taking Out the Rubbish"
1997	Silent Witness	Police Constable No. 2	1 episode: "Friends Like These"
1997	An Unsuitable Job for a Woman	Lunn	1 episode: "Sacrifice"
1998	The Bill	Shane Smith	3 episodes: "Good Faith" (parts 1, 2 & 3)
1998	The Jump	Driver	1 episode #1.4
2000	Happy Birthday Shakespeare	Cameraman	
2000	The Bill	Tony McBride	2 episodes: "Bad for Your Health" (parts 1 & 2)
2001	Shockers	Mate 2	1 episode: "Cyclops"
2001	Band of Brothers	Charge of Quarters	1 episode: "Crossroads"
2001–2003	The Office	Lee	Supporting: 13 episodes
2003	Holby City	Joel Holmes	1 episode: "Til Death Us Do Part"
2003	Doctors	Douglas Lipton	1 episode: "Aftershock"
2004–2006, 2024, 2026	EastEnders	Jake Moon	Series regular: 168 episodes
2008	He Kills Coppers	Vic Sayles	
2009	Heartbeat	Jim Osgood	1 episode: "School of Hard Knocks"
2009	Casualty	Jim	1 episode: "Fight or Flight"
2010	Missing	Jerry Grace	1 episode #2.4
2010	The Bill	Peter Grigson	1 episode: "The Truth Will Out"
2011	Holby City	Jimmy Mercer / Joel Mercer	2 episodes: "Rescue Me" & "All About Me"
2013	Life of Crime	DI Gainham	2 episodes
2014–2016	Casualty	Mark Richie	4 episodes: "The Love You Take" (2014), "The Last Goodbye" (2015), "Survivors" (2016) & "Tangled Webs We Weave" (2016)
2016	Coronation Street	Paediatric Consultant	1 episode
2025	The Feud	Ian Casey	3 episodes
