= List of EastEnders characters introduced in 2005 =

EastEnders logo

The following is a list of characters that first appeared in the UK BBC soap opera EastEnders in 2005, by order of first appearance.

== Johnny Allen ==
Johnny Allen, played by Billy Murray, first appears in January 2005, and is the father of Ruby Allen (Louisa Lytton). An old East End gangster, Johnny established himself as Walford's crime kingpin upon killing fellow mob boss Andy Hunter (Michael Higgs) and later ordering the death of his friend Dennis Rickman (Nigel Harman). He also has relationship with Tina Stewart (Charlotte Avery). He soon becomes central to the "Get Johnny Week" storyline, in which Grant (Ross Kemp) and Phil Mitchell (Steve McFadden) confront Johnny over his role in Dennis' death. The storyline ends with Johnny - at his daughter's urging - handing himself to the police to confess to his life of crime, including his role in the murders of both Andy and Dennis. Nearly seven months later, Johnny ultimately meets his downfall when he learns that Ruby's boyfriend Sean Slater (Robert Kazinsky) attempts to extracts their assets; after failing to warn him off, Johnny dies of a heart attack whilst attempting to arrange for Sean to be killed.

== Reverend Stevens ==
The Reverend George Stevens
- EastEnders character
- Portrayed by: Michael Keating
- Duration: 2005–2013, 2015–2017
- First appearance: Episode 2869; 10 January 2005
- Last appearance: Episode 5571; 28 September 2017
- Introduced by: Kathleen Hutchison (2005); Diederick Santer (2007); Bryan Kirkwood (2010); Lorraine Newman (2013); Dominic Treadwell-Collins (2015)
In-universe information
- Occupation: Vicar
- Nephews: Tim Stevens

The Reverend George Stevens, played by Michael Keating, is a recurring character who is the vicar in Walford. His first appearance was in the episode originally broadcast on 10 January 2005, being introduced by executive producer Kathleen Hutchison, and he has appeared in at least one episode every year until 2014, when he does not appear at all throughout the year. He returns in April 2015 until his exit on 28 September 2017 when he retires.

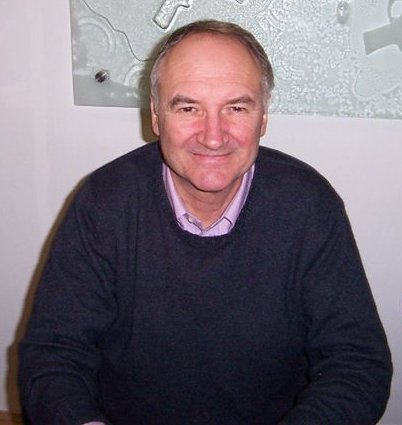
Michael Keating, who plays Mr Stevens

He first appears to discuss Freddie Mitchell's christening with his mother Little Mo (Kacey Ainsworth) in 2005. Following this, he appears to discuss Den (Leslie Grantham) and Chrissie Watts' (Tracy-Ann Oberman) vow renewals, and conducts the funerals of Neil (Robin Sneller) and Sue Miller (Sadie Shimmin/Victoria Willing), Nana Moon (Hilda Braid), Dennis Rickman (Nigel Harman), Pauline Fowler (Wendy Richard) and Frank Butcher (Mike Reid). Stevens occasionally visits Dot Branning (June Brown) to discuss her faith, including following the death of her friend Pauline and Dot's struggle when she takes on the responsibility of caring for a refugee baby. In December 2008, he returns, after Dot donates a substantial amount of money to have the church roof repaired. He feels it is his need to investigate whether Dot has donated from her own life savings but she does not want to make a fuss.

In March 2009, he arranges plans for Peggy Mitchell's (Barbara Windsor) wedding to Archie Mitchell (Larry Lamb), and also conducts Amy Mitchell's christening in April and May 2009. In January 2010, he performs Archie's funeral. Stevens is also seen in March, conducting Bradley Branning's (Charlie Clements) funeral. In September, he meets Heather Trott (Cheryl Fergison) and Minty Peterson (Cliff Parisi) to talk about a christening for Heather's baby son George, and is confused about Heather and Minty's relationship. The next week he conducts the christening. In October 2010, Max Branning (Jake Wood) arranges for him to visit his sister Carol Jackson (Lindsey Coulson) following the death of her son, Billie Jackson (Devon Anderson), but Carol gets angry as Billie was not religious.

In October 2011, he conducts a funeral of a local man, but Dot's half-sister, Rose (Polly Perkins), who works in the doctor's surgery, fears she mistakenly killed the man by misplacing his test results. Stevens tells her the patient died of a bee sting, and a relieved Rose then flirts with him, much to the chagrin of Dot. A few days later, Dot reveals Rose's colourful past to Stevens. However, he is intrigued, and he and Rose share a drink at The Queen Victoria public house, as he wants to know more about her life. At a church social event, the pair become closer, resulting in Stevens asking for Dot's blessing to date Rose.

He, Dot and Rose later attend a Mayoral banquet, and on their return to Walford, they announce that the Olympic torch for the 2012 Summer Olympics will be passing through Walford. When Stevens visits Rose to invite her out, he finds that she has spent the night with Patrick Trueman (Rudolph Walker). In January 2012, he conducts Pat Evans' (Pam St Clement) funeral. On Maundy Thursday, he performs the rite of washing feet on Dot and comforts her following the death of Heather. In May 2012, he speaks to Janine Butcher (Charlie Brooks) and Michael Moon (Steve John Shepherd) about their upcoming wedding, as Janine has decided on a church wedding for them. Michael tells Stevens that Janine is Jewish and has had three previous husbands, and Janine decides against the church wedding as a result. In June he conducts the christening at the hospital of Michael and Janine's daughter Scarlett.

In April 2013, Stevens visits Dot to ask why she has not attended Mass on Easter Sunday. Her friend Fatboy (Ricky Norwood) tells Stevens that Dot is about to lose her home, so Stevens convinces her that she has not sinned in the eyes of God. He conducts Michael's funeral in November 2013. He appoints Dot as Church Warden and gets her to raise funds to fix the church roof. He appears on Christmas Eve to conduct a carol service.

Stevens conducts the funeral of Jim Branning (John Bardon) in April 2015. He first discusses the arrangements with Carol and Max is rude to Stevens and tries to get him to leave. Carol sends Max away and Stevens is sympathetic. When Stevens asks who will be reading the eulogy at the funeral, Carol tells him that they will not be having one. At the funeral, Stevens is pleased to see Dot, who has been granted day release from prison in order to attend. Stevens is shocked and outraged during the funeral when Max delivers a damning eulogy about his father, and tries to get him to stop but Max ignores him. In July 2016, Stevens conducts Peggy's funeral. In December 2016, Stevens appears when a nativity play is held at the church, which Amy and Lily Fowler (Aine Garvey) perform in. Stevens greets Lily's mother Stacey Fowler (Lacey Turner) and stepfather Martin Fowler (James Bye) as they arrive at the church to watch the performance. Stevens later speaks to Roxy Mitchell (Rita Simons) after he discovers her sitting alone in the Albert Square gardens, depressed. She tells him that she feels like she is a bad mother to Amy and has let her down all her life. Stevens reassures Roxy that strong people can bear to hurt themselves for the good of others. In January 2017, Stevens conducts the joint funeral of Roxy and her sister Ronnie Mitchell (Samantha Womack).

In September 2017, he retires and moves to Australia to live with his daughter and is replaced by Irene Mills (Melanie Kilburn).

== Amanda Parry ==
Amanda Parry
- EastEnders character
- Portrayed by: Sarah Preston
- First appearance: Episode 2885; 7 February 2005
- Last appearance: Episode 2998; 23 August 2005
In-universe information
- Occupation: Solicitor

Amanda Parry, played by Sarah Preston, is a friend of Chrissie Watts (Tracy-Ann Oberman), first appearing in the show just before Chrissie and Den Watts (Leslie Grantham) are set to renew their wedding vows. She is aware of Den's nefarious behaviour and dubious associates, and sympathises with Chrissie over Den's affair with Zoe Slater (Michelle Ryan). She plots with Chrissie to get revenge on Den, and looks into Den's financial affairs, finding a secret bank account Den has opened for Zoe, who is pregnant with his child. Chrissie is enraged, but Amanda convinces Chrissie to take a longer view so as to get as much out of Den as possible. She prepares legal papers to put Chrissie's name on the deed of The Queen Victoria public house, and Chrissie persuades Den to eventually sign (as a wedding renewal present) thereby making Chrissie co-owner of the pub. Amanda leaves after the vow-renewal ceremony, urging Chrissie not to go soft on Den.

A few months later, after Den's death, Chrissie is desperate to get full control of the pub (to sell it) and asks Amanda for help. Amanda returns to Walford, at which time Chrissie tells her that Den has run off with another woman and is in hiding again. Amanda wants to track him down, but Chrissie convinces her that it will take a long time to find him, and that she cannot stand to live in The Queen Victoria any longer, as Den's children Sharon (Letitia Dean) and Dennis (Nigel Harman) have returned. Amanda is aware of the way Den placed Sharon above all others, including Chrissie, and is resentful of her presence. Chrissie forges Den's signature on papers that give her full control of the pub, getting Amanda, after much hesitancy, to sign as a witness. Amanda then leaves Walford, taking the papers to lodge at court and Chrissie puts the pub up for sale.

== Tina Stewart ==
Tina Stewart
- EastEnders character
- Portrayed by: Charlotte Avery
- First appearance: Episode 2906; 15 March 2005
- Last appearance: Episode 3038; 1 November 2005

Tina Stewart is played by Charlotte Avery.

Tina is the girlfriend of Johnny Allen (Billy Murray). She was previously his mistress for 10 years, and supported him when his wife and older daughter were killed in a house fire. After making peace with Johnny's daughter Ruby (Louisa Lytton), Tina finally moves in with Johnny, where they seem to enjoy some measure of domestic tranquility between crises. She feels uncomfortable when Johnny hires an attractive barmaid, Amy (Nina Fry), for his nightclub Scarlet, and Ruby later finds him kissing Amy, leading to her telling Tina about the whole incident. Johnny openly admits to having a fling and shocks Tina with his attitude by trying to brush it off as though it is nothing, telling Tina to forget it. Tina eventually learns what Johnny is really like upon discovering his nefarious activities, and leaves Albert Square for good.

== Ruby Allen ==
Ruby Allen, played by Louisa Lytton, is the daughter of Johnny Allen (Billy Murray). Ruby arrives in Walford after being at boarding school, and so she does not know her father well. However Johnny's criminal activities and violent habits soon become apparent to Ruby, and it horrifies her. However Johnny is equally as horrified in Ruby's choice of boyfriends; firstly Juley Smith (Joseph Kpobie) and then Sean Slater (Robert Kazinsky). Sean is the brother of Ruby's best friend, Stacey (Lacey Turner), but Ruby and Stacey have a tempestuous friendship, and often argue.

== Margaret Wilson ==
Margaret Wilson
- EastEnders character
- Portrayed by: Janet Amsden
- Duration: 2005–2006
- First appearance: Episode 2912; 25 March 2005
- Last appearance: Episode 3149; 9 May 2006
In-universe information
- Occupation: Retired
- Daughters: Sue Miller
- Granddaughters: Rebecca Miller (adoptive)

Margaret Wilson, played by Janet Amsden, is the adoptive grandmother of Sonia (Natalie Cassidy) and Martin Fowler's (James Alexandrou) daughter, Rebecca Miller, and mother of Rebecca's adoptive mother, Sue Miller (Sadie Shimmin/Victoria Willing). When Sue, along with her husband Neil (Robin Sneller) were killed in a car crash in 2005 Margaret became the parental guardian of Rebecca.

Margaret is first seen when Sonia visits her (under the name "Pamela") to see Rebecca. Margaret discovers that Sonia is Rebecca's biological mother, but after initially being hostile, she allows Sonia, along with Martin and Martin's mother Pauline (Wendy Richard) to continue to visit Rebecca. On 15 December 2005, Margaret admits that she is getting tired so she lets Pauline, Martin and Sonia look after Rebecca for Christmas 2005. On 1 May 2006, Margaret visits Sonia to tell her she wants her and Martin to be Rebecca's legal guardians. Just days later, she is disgusted with Sonia, as she discovers that Sonia has left Martin and lied about being together. Sonia later visits Margaret, who is almost convinced to allow Sonia back into Rebecca's life, until Sonia tells Margaret she is in a relationship with another woman, Naomi Julien (Petra Letang). The next day, Martin visits Margaret and convinces her that Rebecca would be more secure with him and Pauline. On 1 June 2006, Martin receives a phone call to say Margaret has died. Margaret's funeral is on Monday 12 June 2006.

== Trisha Taylor ==
Trisha Taylor
- EastEnders character
- Portrayed by: Cathy Murphy
- First appearance: Episode 2945; 23 May 2005
- Last appearance: Episode 2993; 15 August 2005
In-universe information
- Husband: Ray Taylor
- Sons: Leo Taylor
- Granddaughters: Aleesha Miller

Trisha Taylor, played by Cathy Murphy, is the mother of Leo Taylor (Philip Dowling) and is married to Ray Taylor (Dorian Lough), who abuses her. Trisha is first seen when Demi Miller (Shana Swash) and her family moves briefly back to estate where the Taylors live. The Millers and the Taylors do not like each other, yet Demi and Leo have a daughter together, Aleesha (Freya and Phoebe Coltman-West). However Trisha soon shows an interest in her granddaughter, and accompanies Leo to Aleesha's christening, only to be dragged out of the church by Ray. When Trisha and Ray plan to move away to Scotland with Leo, he runs away with Demi and Aleesha. Trisha joins the Millers in trying to find the runaways, but Leo takes a heroin overdose just before they find them, and dies later in hospital.

Murphy previously appeared in EastEnders in 1991 playing the character of Lorna. After playing Trisha in 2005, she returned to the series in 2010 playing a third character, Julie Perkins.

== Naomi Julien ==
Naomi Julien, played by Petra Letang, first arrives in Albert Square as Sonia Fowler's (Natalie Cassidy) nurse friend. Naomi develops romantic feelings for Sonia, and eventually they become a couple, with Sonia leaving her husband Martin (James Alexandrou). However Sonia soon prioritises her daughter Rebecca over Naomi, and they split up. Naomi joins Dr. May Wright (Amanda Drew) working at Albert Square's surgery, however May's personal problems soon start affecting Naomi negatively.

== Joe Macer ==
Joe Macer, played by Ray Brooks, meets Pauline Fowler (Wendy Richard) at a salsa dance club, and they become friends. Joe falls in love with Pauline and pursues her. They marry in February 2006, however when Joe's old friend Bert Atkinson (Dave Hill) arrives, Joe has to admit his criminal past to Pauline. As time progresses, Pauline's erratic and devious behaviour causes the couple to split with terrible consequences.

== Dawn Swann ==
Dawn Swann, played by Kara Tointon, is the sister of Mickey Miller (Joe Swash) and daughter of Rosie Miller (Gerry Cowper). Dawn is first seen in France when she reacquaints Mickey with their father, Mike Swann (Mark Wingett). She moves to Walford after Mike's property scam fails, and lives with Rosie and her family. Dawn meets Rob Minter (Stuart Laing) and they begin dating, but Rob ends their relationship when his wife, May (Amanda Drew), wants to give their marriage another chance. Dawn discovers she is pregnant with Rob's child, and plans to have an abortion. However May, who is unable to conceive, has other ideas. Dawn later has a relationship with Garry Hobbs (Ricky Groves).

== Mike Swann ==
Mike Swann
- EastEnders character
- Portrayed by: Mark Wingett
- Duration: 2005–2006
- First appearance: Episode 3017; 26 September 2005
- Last appearance: Episode 3115; 10 March 2006
- Created by: Kate Harwood
In-universe information
- Other names: Mark Swinton
- Occupation: Con man
- Mother: Nora Swann
- Wife: Rosie Miller (1982–1988)
- Sons: Mickey Miller
- Daughters: Dawn Swann
- Granddaughters: Summer Swann

Mike Swann is played by Mark Wingett.

Mike is the ex-husband of Rosie Miller (Gerry Cowper), and father of Mickey Miller (Joe Swash) and Dawn Swann (Kara Tointon). Mike deserted his family when Dawn was six and Mickey was three.

Dawn tracked her father down and went to live with him in France years later. She invites Mickey to visit, not telling him about Mike. Mickey takes Gus Smith (Mohammed George), Juley Smith (Joseph Kpobie), Garry Hobbs (Ricky Groves) and Minty Peterson (Cliff Parisi) with him. Mike exposes Juley as a conman, as he is one himself. He cons Minty out of his life savings and then flees. He feels guilty and returns the money to Mickey, and sends Dawn back to Walford with Mickey, then drives away on the lookout for his next scam.

He arrives in Walford on Christmas Day 2005, following the illness of his mother Nora Swann (Pamela Cundell). He is then persuaded to stay at the Millers' house by Dawn after he reveals he is penniless and has nowhere to stay. Keith Miller (David Spinx) does not like that Mike is staying and constantly tries to get him out. Mike stays on the Millers' sofa, where Darren Miller (Charlie G. Hawkins) has hidden a large sum of money he has found. Mike discovers the money and steals it, suggesting to Keith that he buys a new sofa as the old one is in poor condition. The old sofa is then burnt on a bonfire and the family believe the money has been destroyed.

Mike eventually finds a job as a manager of Johnny Allen's (Billy Murray) nightclub Scarlet. After spending some time with Rosie, he admits he wants to get back together with her. Rosie too starts to realise her feelings for Mike have returned. Mike tells her to leave Keith behind and go with him and take her children Darren and Demi Miller (Shana Swash) with her too, but Rosie backs out and Mike leaves the Square on his own, once again abandoning his son and daughter. After his mother dies, Mike returns and gets Dawn involved in a scam to get Nora's money. Nora has left £5,000 to Rosie, but Mike gets Dawn to pose as Rosie to get the money from Nora's carer. Mike had told Dawn that he is going to start a new life in Spain for himself and Rosie, but in reality, he has only booked a one-way ticket to Spain for himself. Dawn, Rosie and Mickey discover this just before he is about to leave, but Rosie gives the money to Mike anyway, on the condition that he never comes back.

== Ritchie Scott ==
Ritchie Scott
- EastEnders character
- Portrayed by: Sian Webber
- Duration: 2005–2012, 2014–2016, 2018–2020, 2022–present
- First appearance: Episode 3032; 21 October 2005
- Introduced by: Kate Harwood (2005); Diederick Santer (2007); Bryan Kirkwood (2011); Dominic Treadwell-Collins (2014); John Yorke (2018); Jon Sen (2019, 2022); Chris Clenshaw (2023); Ben Wadey (2025)
In-universe information
- Other names: Richmal Scott
- Occupation: Solicitor

Ritchie Scott, played by Sian Webber, is Phil Mitchell's (Steve McFadden) solicitor, taking the place of Marcus Christie (Stephen Churchett). In 2020, Sara Wallis and Ian Hyland from The Daily Mirror placed Ritchie 89th on their ranked list of the best EastEnders characters of all time, calling her an "unsung hero" and a "Glam lawyer" who has the "toughest gig in town" due to having to fix the "Mitchell messes".

Ritchie is first seen when she visits Phil's mother Peggy Mitchell (Barbara Windsor) and gives her information and advice about Phil's upcoming trial for armed robbery. In November 2005, Ritchie gives Phil advice about his sister Sam's (Kim Medcalf) arrest for the murder of Den Watts (Leslie Grantham), and in April 2006 advises him on his custody battle for his son, Ben (Charlie Jones), with Ben's older half brother Ian Beale (Adam Woodyatt), following their mother Kathy's (Gillian Taylforth) supposed death. In 2006, she works alongside Stella Crawford (Sophie Thompson), who meets with Phil when Ritchie is not available.

Phil re-hires Ritchie in January 2007 to represent Sonia Fowler (Natalie Cassidy) when she is arrested for the murder of her ex-mother-in-law, Pauline (Wendy Richard). Ritchie appears again in January 2008 when Jack Branning (Scott Maslen) has recorded evidence that Phil supplied Kevin Wicks (Phil Daniels) with stolen cut-and-shut cars that led to Kevin's death.

In September 2009, upon the return of Sam (now played by Danniella Westbrook), she advises the Mitchells that Sam faces five and a half years in prison for perverting the course of justice, failure to surrender and travelling on a false passport. In June 2010 she visits Phil to talk about Ben's upcoming court case for assaulting Jordan Johnson (Michael-Joel David Stuart) and suggests that Jordan could change his story to say Ben was provoked. When Ben is due to attend Crown Court, Ritchie tells Phil that, based on a recent, similar case, Ben could get six weeks' custody. However, Phil is angry with Ritchie when Ben is sentenced to five months.

In December 2011, Phil re-hires Ritchie when he is arrested for Kevin's murder after Denise Fox (Diane Parish) hands in a copy of Jack's recording. She returns soon after to warn Phil to flee the country as the police are coming to arrest him. Although she does not know why, it is for Stella's murder. In March 2012, Phil's partner Shirley Carter (Linda Henry) confronts Ritchie because Phil is going to plead guilty to the manslaughter of Stella. Ritchie informs Shirley that Phil was attacked in prison. After Ian reveals to the police that Ben had lied about Stella's murder, Ritchie informs Shirley of Phil's release from prison.

In April 2012, Ritchie represents Billy Mitchell (Perry Fenwick) when he is arrested on suspicion of the murder of Heather Trott (Cheryl Fergison) after he is found in possession of a large amount of money, which the police suspect he stole from her before she died, though this is not true. Ritchie convinces Phil to tell the police that he loaned the money to Billy and he is later released on bail. In August 2012, Ben (now Joshua Pascoe) confesses to Heather's murder. Ben refuses to let Ritchie represent him, which angers Phil. She is present when Phil's family are interviewed, and later informs Phil that Ben could face a minimum of 10 years in prison.

Ritchie returns, in March 2014, when she sorts out the contract for Phil and Sharon Rickman's (Letitia Dean) new bar, The Albert. She advises Phil to watch Sharon carefully as she had tried to take full control of the bar without Phil's knowledge.

In May 2014, Phil asks Ritchie to contact Ben in prison to convince him to see Phil and grant him a visiting order, but Ritchie tells Phil that Ben had been released from prison the previous month. In July, Ritchie gives Billy legal advice when he is accused of involvement in the murder of Lucy Beale (Hetti Bywater) (see Who Killed Lucy Beale?). She leaves when Phil advises him to implicate Lucy's twin brother Peter Beale (Ben Hardy) to draw attention away from himself. Ritchie is present when Billy gives his statement to the police and it is revealed that she knows the lead investigating officer, DI Samantha Keeble (Alison Newman). Billy ignores the advice and tells the truth and Ritchie tells him that he has implicated himself as a prime suspect in the investigation. In August, Ritchie appears in an online clip, representing Jay Brown (Jamie Borthwick) whilst he is questioned by Keeble in connection with a robbery. The following day, Ritchie visits Phil and Sharon and explains that the robbery Jay is suspected of was committed the night Lucy was killed. She also reveals that there was another boy present during the robbery who matches Ben's description. Phil later meets Ritchie outside the police station and she reveals that she has found out the address of the witness who identified Jay and Phil tells her to visit him, whilst he gives Jay an alibi.

In January 2015, Ritchie appears when Phil is charged with attempting to murder his cousin Ronnie Mitchell (Samantha Womack) by cutting the breaks on her car. Ritchie informs Phil's family of the charges against him and tells Sharon that Phil wants her to visit him in prison. The following day, Ritchie refuses to help the Mitchells further, as she has not been paid, and offers to pass Phil's case files to another solicitor; this angers Sharon, who accuses Ritchie of being disloyal. Two weeks later, Sharon contacts Ritchie and convinces her to take on Phil's case again after promising to come up with the money Ritchie is owed.

In April, Phil meets up with Ritchie after stealing her client book from her office. He threatens to reveal her criminal clients if she does not clear the Mitchell's debt with her. Ritchie reluctantly agrees to Phil's demands and he gives her the client book back. Phil then hires her to represent Dot Branning (June Brown) when she is accused of murdering her son Nick Cotton (John Altman), and she also helps Phil track down Sharon's birth father. She also gives Phil information about Vincent Hubbard (Richard Blackwood).

In July 2015, Ritchie represents Ben (now Harry Reid) when he is arrested for Lucy's murder. She barges into the police station and interrupts a video identity parade Keeble and DCI Jill Marsden (Sophie Stanton) are holding with a witness. Ritchie is furious with Marsden and berates her for her methods, accusing her of bending the rules. She then advises Ben to remain silent during his interview, which she sits in on. She later updates Phil on Ben's situation and he thanks her, causing Ritchie to remind him to pay her on time. Marsden asks Ritchie to wait in the interview room whilst she and Keeble review some new evidence. Ritchie then calls Phil from the police station and gives him another update on Ben's situation. Ritchie is annoyed at being kept waiting by Marsden and nearly overhears her telling DS Cameron Bryant (Glen Wallace) that she used to be a stripper to pay her fees for law school. Later in the week, Ritchie reveals that Ben will still be held in custody for mugging Lucy and that the police will be wanting to question Jay over the mugging too, causing Jay to flee. Ritchie sits in on Marsden's interview of Ben over Lucy's mugging. When Marsden goads Ben and reduces him to tears, Ritchie orders her to terminate the interview and release Ben, threatening to report her to her superior officer if she does not. In November, Ritchie helps Sharon seize control of Phil's assets by power of attorney after his drinking spirals out of control and she signs them over to Sharon and Ben.

In March 2016, Ben and Ronnie contact Ritchie when they attempt to seize control of Phil's businesses as he continues to behave erratically, and Phil throws them out of his house when he discovers what they are planning. Ritchie tells Ronnie that there is nothing she can do and Phil shouts at her as she gets in her car to leave. After Phil destroys the car lot with a digger and is arrested, Ritchie brings him home from the police station the following day. In April, Ritche reappears when Jay is arrested for having a relationship with an underage girl. Ritchie refuses to represent him, but advises him to speak to the duty solicitor and informs the Mitchells that Jay is being charged with possession of indecent images of a child. In May, Sharon hires Ritchie to represent Bobby Beale (Eliot Carrington) after he is arrested for assaulting his adoptive mother Jane Beale (Laurie Brett). Ritchie advises Bobby not to comment during his police interview but Bobby ignores this. After the interview, Ritchie leaves the room, and DS Howard South (Paul Stocker) then informs her that Bobby has confessed to Lucy's murder. Ritchie then sits in when the police interview Bobby about Lucy's death. The following week, Ritchie is present when Bobby is charged with unlawful killing, and is annoyed when he is refused bail. Ritchie then visits Jane and Ian at the hospital, where Jane is recovering, and advises them to convince Bobby to plead not guilty, to give her time to build up a convincing defence case before the trial. Ritchie visits Ian and Jane at the hospital again on the day of Bobby's sentencing. She tells them that as Bobby had pleaded guilty there is a chance that he could return home if the judge sentences him to a non-custodial youth rehabilitation order. Ritchie later attends Bobby's sentencing and mitigates for him, but despite her best efforts, Bobby is sentenced to three years youth custody. The following day she informs Ian of Bobby's progress in prison and tells him that Bobby is doing well as it is different from an adult prison. Ritchie also suggests appealing against Bobby's sentence, and offers to argue that he could be rehabilitated more at home. She then tells Ian that the choice is Bobby's but then tells Sharon and Kathy, who is actually alive, that Bobby may choose to stay in prison and serve his sentence. In October, Ritchie visits Phil in hospital, where he is suffering from liver failure, and helps him amend his will, leaving everything to his daughter Louise Mitchell (Tilly Keeper). After Sharon objects, Phil calls Ritchie back to the hospital and gets her to change the will to include Ben and Sharon's son Dennis Rickman Jnr (Bleu Landau).

Ritchie returns in September 2018 to help the Carters free Mick Carter (Danny Dyer) from prison after he is accused of shooting Stuart Highway (Ricky Champ). Ritchie returns again in July 2019 when Phil gets her to amend his will to include Louise's fiancée, Keanu Taylor (Danny Walters). Phil hires Ritchie once more in April 2020 when Phil hands himself into the police for his role in a boat accident on the River Thames which lead to Dennis' death. Ritchie attempts to help Phil but is unable to due to the fact Phil blames himself forcing Ritchie to leave him to his own devices. She returns again in September in order to help Phil and Denise regain custody of their son, and once more in December to finalise Phil and Sharon's divorce.

Ritchie appears in January 2022 to defend Phil against Keeble's investigation into his involvement in the death of Vincent Hubbard (Richard Blackwood). Phil's sister Sam (now played by Kim Medcalf again) meets with Ritchie in May 2022 about her predicament with Denise Fox's (Diane Parish) money. Ritchie later represents Freddie Slater (Bobby Brazier) in October 2023 after he is arrested on suspicion of the attempted murder of Theo Hawthorne (William Ellis).

In September 2025 she returns once again to help defend Zoe Slater (Michelle Ryan) after she is brought into the police under suspension of an assault she had committed

Ritchie gives her full name as "Richmal" when confirming her presence at one of Phil's recorded police interviews. Although no further details are given about her personal life, Ritchie references "the missus" in one episode, suggesting she is either a lesbian or bisexual.

== Honey Mitchell ==
Honey Mitchell, played by Emma Barton, is employed by Yolande Trueman (Angela Wynter) as a "honey trap" to see if her husband Patrick (Rudolph Walker) is willing to commit adultery. During the set up Honey meets Billy Mitchell (Perry Fenwick). They soon become attracted to each other, and finally become a couple in December 2005. Honey becomes pregnant by Billy, and gives birth to a girl, Janet, on their wedding day in September 2006. Honey and Billy have a second child, Will Mitchell, November 2007. However Billy's lies and deceptions ultimately lead to Honey leaving Billy in September 2008.

== Corky ==
Corky
- EastEnders character
- Portrayed by: Uncredited
- Duration: 2005, 2008
- First appearance: Episode 3069/3070; 25 December 2005
- Last appearance: Episode 3621; 29 July 2008
- Breed: Galah
In-universe information
- Owner: Mo Harris

Corky is a Galah parrot that is bought by Mo Harris (Laila Morse) on 25 December 2005, after she mistakenly believed she was buying a cheap turkey for Christmas dinner. Mo subsequently keeps Corky as a pet. On 29 July 2008, Corky escapes from their cage and out the window whilst Roxy Mitchell (Rita Simons) is trying on her wedding dress after her dog Albert opens Corky's cage. Roxy unsuccessfully chases after Corky, climbing up on to the roof to catch them, but gets stuck up there when the ladder falls to the ground. A furious Mo creates "Missing Parrot" posters with a £200 reward and tells Roxy that she will be paying the reward money. Corky is not seen again.

== Nora Swann ==
Nora Swann
- EastEnders character
- Portrayed by: Pamela Cundell
- Duration: 2005–2006
- First appearance: Episode 3071; 26 December 2005
- Last appearance: Episode 3099; 10 February 2006
In-universe information
- Sons: Mike Swann
- Grandsons: Mickey Miller
- Granddaughters: Dawn Swann

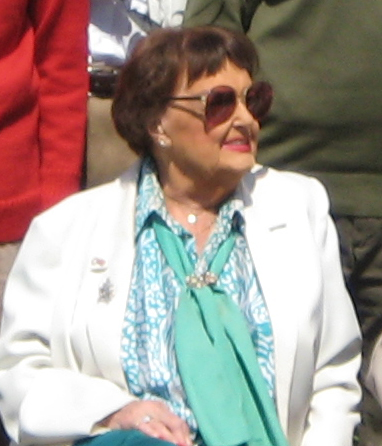
Nora is portrayed by Pamela Cundell.

Nora Swann, played by Pamela Cundell, appears in five episodes between December 2005 and February 2006. She is introduced as the ill mother of Mike Swann (Mark Wingett).

She first appears when Mike's former wife and daughter, Rosie Miller (Gerry Cowper) and Dawn Swann (Kara Tointon), visit her in hospital. She gets on well with Rosie and Dawn, but does not appear to get on well with Mike. Her illness is the reason Mike comes to Walford and stays with the Millers. She dies on 16 February 2006 from pneumonia, with Rosie at her side.

== Others ==
Character	Date(s)	Actor	Circumstances
DC Mitch Cowen	21–25 February (2 episodes)	Tristan Gemmill	A police officer who investigates the suspicious death of Andy Hunter (Michael Higgs), who was pushed from a flyover by Johnny Allen (Billy Murray). He interviews Johnny and his associate Jake Moon (Joel Beckett), but the eventual outcome of the investigation is that Andy committed suicide.
Mr Bremner	3 March 2005	Colin Gourley	Andy Hunter's (Michael Higgs) solicitor. He reads contents of Andy's will following his funeral. Andy's widow, Sam (Kim Medcalf) is in attendance and is shocked to learn that Andy has left his house to his tenant Pat Evans (Pam St Clement) and the bookies to Dennis Rickman (Nigel Harman), respectively. Sam is further enraged when Andy leaves her with nothing but his wedding ring, along with an insulting final message.
Michael Rawlins	10 May-17 June	Melvyn Hayes	A driving instructor who tries to teach Dot Branning (June Brown) how to drive. After a few lessons Michael makes a pass on Dot which she quickly rejects, and she decides to stop taking any more driving lessons from Michael. Michael then threatens to tell Dot's husband Jim (John Bardon) about what had happened, but Dot calls his bluff. Then Michael tells her that he can recommend her to another driving instructor if she wants to continue taking lessons, and then leaves.
PC Philips	1-8 August	Vinta Morgan	A police officer who investigated the disappearances of teenagers. Aleesha Miller (Shana Swash) and Leo Taylor (Philip Dowling).
DC Bull	19 September 2005-2 January 2006 (2 episodes)	Adam Astill	A Detective Constable who speaks to Den Watts' (Leslie Grantham) widow, Chrissie (Tracy-Ann Oberman) to inform her that Den's body is ready for release. On New Year's Day, Bull and DS Maggie Wilson (Heather Bleasdale) ask Phil Mitchell (Steve McFadden) and his mother, Peggy (Barbara Windsor) for information about Dennis Rickman's (Nigel Harman) murder at midnight.
Amy	17 October–24 January 2006	Nina Fry	A barmaid in Johnny Allen's (Billy Murray) nightclub, Scarlet. Amy then has an affair with Johnny behind his partner Tina Stewart's (Charlotte Avery) back. When Johnny leaves Albert Square and the new manager, Mike Swann (Mark Wingett) has fled, Amy becomes manager of the club. She last appears when Stacey Slater's (Lacey Turner) drink in the club is laced with illegal drugs by Deano Wicks (Matt Di Angelo), and she and Stacey have a fight.
William Moon	11 November	Dickon Tolson	Alfie Moon's (Shane Richie) late grandfather who is seen in flashbacks of 1944. William married Victoria Montgomery (Hilda Braid) in 1943 and left to fight in World War II when she was two months pregnant. Two months after Victoria gave birth to their son, Alfred Moon in 1944, William was killed in Normandy.
Alfred Moon	11 November	Uncredited	Alfie Moon's (Shane Richie) late father, who is seen in flashbacks of his birth on 18 April 1944. His father William (Dickon Tolson) was killed in World War II, and his mother Victoria (Hilda Braid) raised him alone. Alfred later married a woman named Cherry, and they had two sons, Alfie (born 1964) and Spencer (Christopher Parker) (born 1983). Alfred and Cherry were killed in a car accident on Shrove Tuesday 1988, leaving their sons orphaned.
Sid	11 November	Trevor Peacock; Zac McGuire (flashback)	Appears in the Normandy/Remembrance Day episode, both in the flashbacks and in the present day action. In the flashbacks, Sid joins the army aged 16, lying about his age (he pretended to be 18) to become a "hero". He is consoled by William Moon (Dickon Tolson) before going into battle, which he survives, but William does not. Sixty one years later, Sid meets William's grandson, Alfie Moon (Shane Richie), trying to force-feed his sick grandmother and William's widow, Victoria (Hilda Braid), in a Normandy restaurant. When Alfie leaves the restaurant, Sid follows him to shout at him, but they soon start talking, both being unaware of their connection to William.
Dr Isla McCulloch	29 November– 1 December (2 episodes)	Daniele Lydon	A doctor called by Alfie Moon (Shane Richie), who is worried about his Nana's (Hilda Braid) deteriorating health. She offers him help, but he declines, telling her he can look after Nana by himself. In December, Isla visits Nana again, only to be seen by Alfie's estranged wife Kat (Jessie Wallace), who presumes that the doctor is Alfie's new lover. Kat later sees her in The Queen Victoria pub with another man, and confronts her. Isla reveals that she is Nana's doctor, and that the other man is her husband, Callum (Julian Harries).
Callum McCulloch	1 December	Julian Harries	The husband of Isla McCulloch (Daniele Lydon), Victoria Moon's (Hilda Braid) doctor. When Victoria's grandson Alfie's (Shane Richie) estranged wife Kat (Jessie Wallace) sees Alfie and Isla together, she presumes that they are a couple. She sees Isla and Callum together and confronts them. Isla then reveals that she is Nana's doctor, not Alfie's lover.
Abby Bryant	8 December	Charlotte McDonagh	The best friend of Stacey Slater (Lacey Turner). Abby had been mentioned by Stacey numerous time since she first arrived in Walford in November 2004, and Stacey had previously been seen gossiping with Abby on the phone on various occasions. When Stacey returns home to visit her ill mother, Jean (Gillian Wright), she sees a heavily pregnant Abby in a café. Stacey is upset with Abby because they have lost contact, and Abby did not tell Stacey about the increasing severity of Jean's illness. When Abby lights a cigarette, Stacey calls her "Vicky Pollard", which Abby responds to by making fun of Jean, calling her "retarded" and "a sket". Stacey severs ties with Abby after this and does not see her again.
Dominic Morton	9 December	William Neenan	The prosecution lawyer at Janine Evans' (Charlie Brooks) trial for the murder of Laura Beale (Hannah Waterman). Pat Evans (Pam St. Clement), who Janine was with when Laura died, tells him that she can give Janine an alibi, after previously lying and saying she had not seen Janine.
