= Nana Moon =

Fictional character from the BBC soap opera EastEnders

- EastEnders character
- Hilda Braid as Nana Moon (2003)
- Portrayed by: Hilda Braid; Kate Colgrave Pope (flashback)
- Duration: 2002–2005
- First appearance: Episode 2422; 3 December 2002
- Last appearance: Episode 3064; 16 December 2005
- Introduced by: Louise Berridge
In-universe information
- Other names: Victoria Moon
- Occupation: Retired
- Husband: William Moon (backstory)
- Sons: Alfred Moon
- Grandsons: Alfie Moon; Spencer Moon

Nana Moon is a fictional character from the BBC soap opera EastEnders, played by Hilda Braid. In a special episode, Kate Colgrave Pope played her as a 24-year-old in a flashback episode from 1944. She was introduced alongside her grandsons, Alfie (Shane Richie) and Spencer Moon (Christopher Parker), and made her first appearance on 3 December 2002. She was introduced by executive producer Louise Berridge in 2002, and a decision was made to kill off the character in 2005 following the announced departures of her on-screen family, and made her last appearance on 16 December 2005.

Braid appeared in 210 episodes as Nana Moon. Her storylines included meeting Wilfred Atkins (Dudley Sutton), a fraudster who wanted to con her out of her possessions and fulfilling a list of things she wanted to do before she died. During later storylines, Nana's health began to fail and she developed dementia. Nancy Banks-Smith from The Guardian criticised the portrayal of dementia, but praised Braid's performance. Dek Hogan from Digital Spy said the dementia scenes were "a welcome change."

One of Nana's final storylines saw her visit Normandy with Alfie to see her late husband's William's (Dickon Tolson) grave. The episode featured a two-minute silence, flashbacks to Nana's backstory, and a guest appearance from the actor Trevor Peacock, who played Sid, a war veteran. The episode won Best Single Episode at The British Soap Awards in 2006. Braid's final scenes saw her character killed off, after dying of aortic aneurysm. The decision to kill off Nana was criticised by fans and critics, who did not see why she had to be written out of the series, simply because Richie had announced his departure.

== Creation and development ==
Nana was introduced in December 2002 as part of a new family of three introduced to the soap by producer Louise Berridge, the other two being her grandchildren Alfie Moon (Shane Richie) and Spencer Moon (Christopher Parker). She was described as a "batty granny". Gavin Gaughan wrote Braid's obituary in The Guardian, and in it he described Nana as "vague, but always affectionate" and having "a wide smile and good-natured manner, her niche as a maternal Cockney was in the screen tradition inaugurated by Kathleen Harrison, which included Irene Handl and Patricia Hayes."

A special episode featuring Nana and Alfie in France on Armistice Day, the anniversary of the official end of World War I, aired on 11 November 2005. In the storyline, Nana visits her late husband, William's grave in Normandy. The episode also features flashbacks of Nana's first encounter with her late husband in war-time London, and a guest appearance from the actor Trevor Peacock, who played Sid, a war veteran. The episode included a two-minute silence to mark Remembrance Day—a day to commemorate the sacrifice of veterans and civilians in World War I, World War II, and other wars. It was the first time that a soap had featured the silence. The scenes were aired on 11 November 2005.

It was reported in September 2005, that a number of EastEnders characters were to be axed, Nana Moon being one of them. It was subsequently confirmed that the character would be killed off. The reason to kill the character came after the announced departures of her on-screen family. A BBC source commented, "Everyone loves Nana, but [...] she won't have any family left. It's sad, but all good things must end." Consequently, Nana dies as part of the Christmas 2005 storyline. Two years after Nana's death in the serial, Braid herself died of dementia. It was reported in The Daily Telegraph that Braid's memory had been problematic during her stint on the show and that BBC producers had to hire "a personal minder to assist her in learning lines and to ensure that she turned up in the right place at the right time."

== Storylines ==
=== Backstory ===
Victoria Montgomery married William Moon (Dickon Tolson), a soldier, during the Second World War. She was two months pregnant when he left to fight off the invasion of Europe. She gave birth to Alfred Moon on 18 April 1944. William died on 12 June 1944, killed in action. She remained faithful to William and never had sexual relations with any other man, opting to raise their son alone. After Alfred and his wife Cherry were killed in a car crash, she moved in with her two orphaned grandsons, Alfie (Shane Richie) and Spencer Moon (Christopher Parker), who call her 'Nana'.

=== 2002–2005 ===
Moving to Walford with her grandchildren in 2002, Nana's family become worried when she starts to become overly forgetful. It is suspected that she has Alzheimer's disease, but it turns out to be water on the brain, which is operated on with no lasting cognitive effects. Nana meets a pensioner, Wilfred Atkins (Dudley Sutton), while on holiday at the seaside. They plan to marry, but on their wedding day Alfie exposes him as a fraud as he plans to flee with some of Victoria's possessions. She is devastated, and Wilfred leaves Walford having conned Pat Evans (Pam St Clement) out of £30,000. In 2005, Nana is diagnosed with an aortic aneurysm, and takes the decision to die, as her chances of surviving an operation were low due to her age (84). She works on a wish list of things she wants to do before her death, such as getting arrested, playing poker, to have tea with the Queen and to visit her dead husband's grave in Normandy. Alfie takes her to France to fulfill one of her wishes on Armistice Day 2005. Nana lays flowers on William's grave and tells him she will see him very soon. Alfie's emotional state is badly affected by Nana's deteriorating health. As Christmas 2005 approached, the strain and stress on Alfie escalates. Still determined to do whatever his grandmother wishes, he tries to enjoy what he knew would be his final days with her. Per one of her wishes, Alfie buys Nana a battery-operated, dancing toy snowman and helps her decorate the Moon house for Christmas. As Nana and Alfie sit, watching the dancing snowman, the batteries run out. Alfie turns to his grandmother and is heartbroken to see that she has peacefully died on the sofa.

== Reception ==
"Nana Moon's final scenes were brilliantly produced and the acting was first class. I'm sure the scenes touched the hearts of many up and down the country as many of us have, or have had, a family member similar to the Grand Old Lady of Walford. Nana's character is a great loss for the show and, I'm sure you'll agree, will be sadly missed by all."

— Dek Hogan from Digital Spy on Nana's final scenes.

The Armistice Day episode—which was written by Sarah Phelps, directed by Paul Wroblewski and produced by Tom Mullens—won the Best Single Episode award at The British Soap Awards in 2006.

Writing of her storyline with Wilfred, Gaughan said that "Despite the comedic talents of Braid, Sutton and Richie, any hints towards Cockney family comedy were eschewed in favour of Albert Square's preponderance of gloom. Hogan praised Braid's last scenes as Nana saying, "It was sad to see Nana finally bow out this week and the exit was tastefully handled, thanks to a wonderfully dignified performance from Hilda Braid." Nana's death was criticised by EastEnders fans, "who pointed out that she did not have to be written out of the series merely because Alfie was going." Gaughan called her death scenes "touching".

When Braid died in late 2007 an EastEnders spokesperson issued a statement:

"She was a lovely actress who brought her great humour and wit to the role of Nana which earned her many fans, young and old alike. She was a much-loved member of our cast who appeared in over 200 episodes of EastEnders, most notably the award-winning episode that saw her character visit her beloved late husband's grave in Normandy with grandson Alfie Moon (Richie).

=== Dementia ===
Susannah Clapp from The Observer criticised how EastEnders portrayed dementia, saying that "[Nana] faded fairly quickly from beaming vagueness to doolally hopelessness." Nancy Banks-Smith, from The Guardian, also criticised the portrayal of dementia but praised Braid's portrayal of Nana, saying, "There was something odd about Nana, don't you think? On the face of it, she wasn't all there. The part of the brain that notices when all hell is breaking loose around you in large lumps seemed to be missing. The BBC's book about EastEnders refers to her only twice, once as loopy and then as barmy. This hardly covers the case. She may have been conceived as Alfie's batty granny but Hilda Braid injected a steely and unnerving sweetness into the role that made you wonder if Nana wore her battiness as a protective flak jacket." Dek Hogan from Digital Spy said that the dementia scenes were "a welcome change", and added "The scene when [Alfie] was desperately trying to get Nana to eat steak and chips was very moving."
