= Ruby Allen =

Fictional character from EastEnders

- EastEnders character
- Portrayed by: Louisa Lytton
- Duration: 2005–2006, 2018–2021, 2024–2025
- First appearance: Episode 2908; 18 March 2005
- Last appearance: Episode 7100; 10 April 2025
- Introduced by: Kathleen Hutchison (2005); John Yorke (2018); Chris Clenshaw (2024)
- Spin-off appearances: The Queen Vic Quiz Night (2020)
In-universe information
- Occupation: Market trader (clothing); Businesswoman; Promotions manager; Nightclub owner
- Family: Fowler
- Father: Johnny Allen
- Mother: Stephanie Allen
- Sisters: Scarlet Allen
- Husband: Martin Fowler (2020–2021)
- Sons: Roman Fowler
- Stepdaughters: Lily Slater (adoptive); Bex Fowler; Hope Fowler

Ruby Allen is a fictional character from the BBC soap opera EastEnders, played by Louisa Lytton from 18 March 2005 to 23 November 2006, and then again from 18 September 2018 to 17 September 2021, with the recent being on 18 November 2024 until 10 April 2025. The character and casting were announced in February 2005, and Ruby was introduced in March that year by producer Kathleen Hutchison. She was featured in storylines surrounding her gangland father Johnny Allen (Billy Murray), with whom she shared a problematic relationship due to his criminal lifestyle. Other storylines included a close friendship with Stacey Slater (Lacey Turner), and an engagement to Stacey's brother Sean Slater (Robert Kazinsky) – which affected their friendship. In July 2006, Lytton was axed from the show due to limited possibilities for the character following the death of her on-screen father, and Ruby departed on 23 November 2006. Lytton expressed a disappointment in her exit but stated that she would always be grateful for the role.

In July 2018, it was announced that producer John Yorke had decided to reintroduce the character. Following a twelve-year hiatus, Ruby returned on 18 September 2018 to reunite with her best friend Stacey. Producers soon placed her at the centre of a sexual consent storyline, involving a special episode about the views surrounding consent. Lytton and the storyline were praised by viewers and critics alike. In March 2021, Lytton announced she was expecting her first child and would go on maternity leave later in the year. Ruby departed in the episode broadcast on 17 September 2021. In March 2022, Lytton admitted she may not return to the soap following her maternity leave. However in September 2024, it was announced that Lytton would be reprising the role for a prolonged stint later in the year ahead of the show's 40th anniversary. Ruby returned in episode 7015, broadcast 18 November 2024. On 31 March 2025, Lytton confirmed that she had finished filming her stint, and would exit in the coming weeks. Ruby departed the show on 10 April.

== Creation and development ==
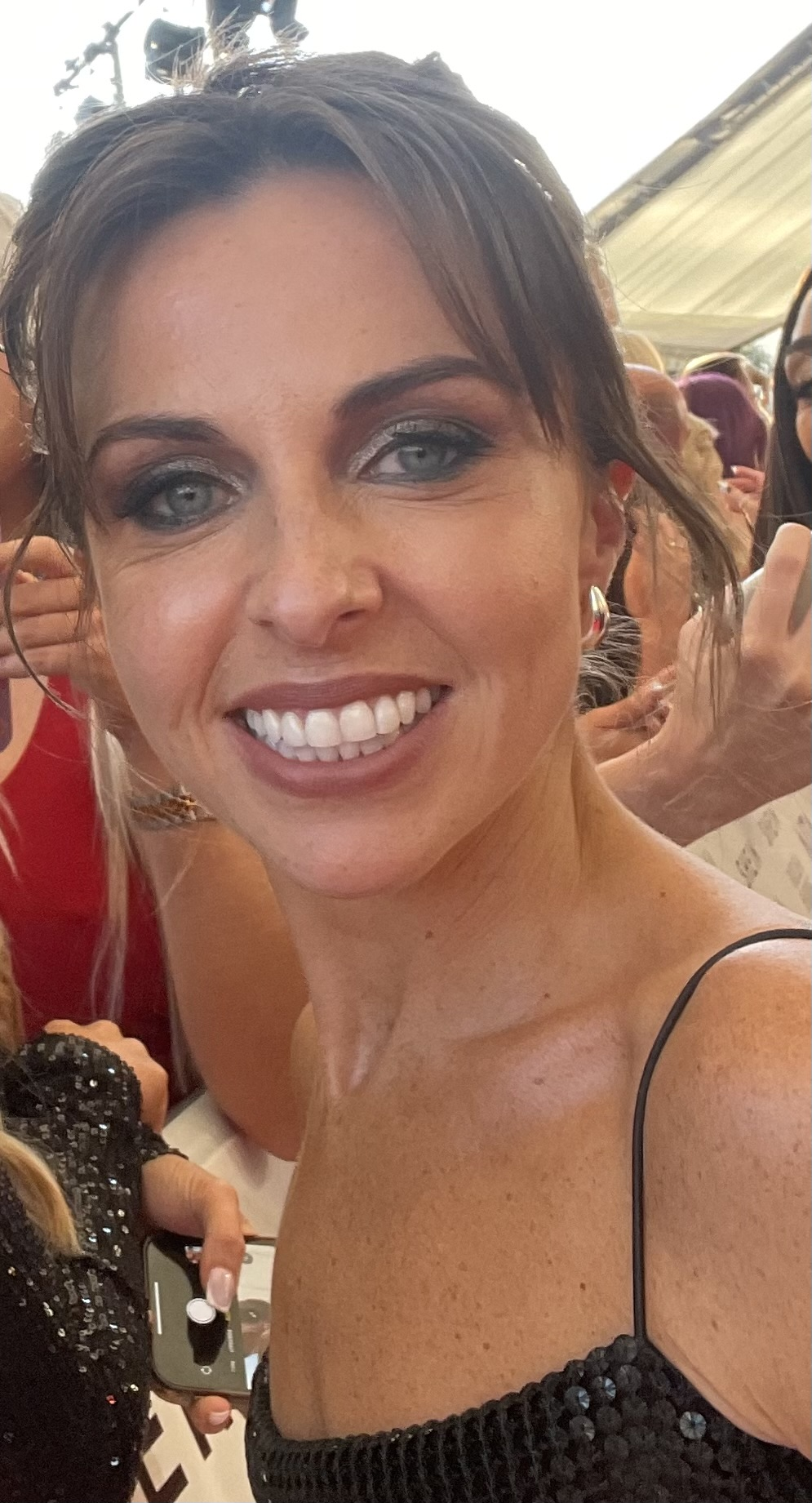
Louisa Lytton (pictured) played Ruby.

=== Casting and characterisation ===
Ruby Allen and her casting were announced on 3 February 2005. Louisa Lytton was cast in the role. Speaking of her casting, Lytton commented "I'm nervous and excited all at the same time to be joining EastEnders. This is an amazing opportunity and I can't believe that I'm going to be working alongside some of my favourite actors and actresses."

Ruby has been described as "daddy's little princess, who has a bite when someone crosses her line." Johnathon Hughes of the Radio Times said "Part of the somewhat shaky mid-2000s era of EastEnders, Ruby was the vulnerable, softly-spoken daughter of dangerous crime boss Johnny who's [sic] womanising and wide [sic] boy ways constantly saw him let his daughter down." Sophie Dainty of Digital Spy stated "Despite being dangerous Johnny's daughter, Ruby was a meek and mild little thing when she first arrived [...] she had been traumatised by a house fire that had killed her mum and her sister and developed a problematic sleep walking habit as a result."

=== Departure ===
On 8 July 2006, Daniel Saney of Digital Spy reported that Lytton would be written out of EastEnders following a mutual decision between the producers and the actress herself. It was decided that the character had no further purpose following the departure of her on-screen father, Johnny Allen (Billy Murray). A spokesperson said "The way the storylines pan out means there's not really much scope for Louisa's character any more." Lytton revealed that she had enjoyed her time at EastEnders, and called it a great experience. She added that she was looking forward to trying new things. Executive producer Kate Harwood stated that Lytton was popular with fans and her character would get a "dramatic" exit.

In December 2009, Lytton said she would have liked her EastEnders exit to have been more dramatic. Speaking to an FHM writer, Lytton explained that her exit, which saw Ruby leave in a black cab with her father's ashes, would have been better if it was something "massive" and "dramatic". In August 2011, Lytton said that she would love to return to the show. She stated that she would immediately cause trouble and come back as a "hard-faced bitch", as Ruby often let people walk over her and constantly cried. Lytton also said that she will always be grateful for the part of Ruby. Speaking to a writer from OK Magazine, Lytton admitted that the experience was brilliant and helped give an insight of what she wanted to do in her career. She added "But there is so much I still want to do at home, like theatre, and build myself up, because I have missed out on things like drama schools. It's funny because when I was there they thought I was a huge star back in Britain!"

Reflecting back at her time on EastEnders during an interview with British Comedy Guide, Lytton told them, "I was 15 when I started. My family were not in the industry at all and it was so full on being in EastEnders. I was so young and I didn't know what to expect. It could have gone one of two ways – either I went off the rails or I grew up. I was focused and I grew up. I do feel really lucky." Talking about whether she'd return to soap, Lytton revealed, "I loved my time on the soap [...] but I am not sure I would return to one again. Never say never!"

=== Reintroduction (2018) ===
Lytton's return to the series was announced on 18 July 2018, twelve years after her departure. Lytton began filming again in Summer 2018 and Ruby returned later in the year. While most of Ruby's return details were embargoed, it was confirmed that Ruby would reconcile with Stacey upon her return. John Yorke, the show's executive consultant, approached Lytton with a return, and she quickly accepted the offer. Lytton expressed her excitement to reprise the role and explore the character. She commented, "We last saw her twelve years ago as a young girl and now she is returning as a woman with scope for major change and some brilliantly challenging storylines." Yorke expressed his delight at Ruby's return and described the character as "much more mature and confident".

Further details about Ruby's reintroduction were released on 11 September. It was revealed that Ruby would anonymously contact Stacey and arrange to meet her at the E20 nightclub, leaving Stacey stunned when she realises that she is meeting Ruby. Lytton thought that while it appears that she is visiting a friend as she passes Walford, Ruby is actually "quite lonely". She commented, "I think it's a thing of going back to what she knows and recreating that friendship with her old friend." Stacey wants to reestablish a friendship with Ruby and prepares for their night out. Lytton hoped that her and Turner's bond came across well on screen and confirmed that they would recommence the friendship started in her first stint. She added that it was "surreal" to reprise the role and described the character as "older and more confident" following her reintroduction. Ruby returns in episode 5779, first broadcast on 18 September.

Lytton revealed that she was shocked to be asked back to EastEnders after such a long time, and told Metro UK, "In my head, obviously I'd always have loved to go back to the show because it was where I started out, but it had been so long that it was never an option in my head anymore [...] I genuinely never thought about it being an option, especially because my dad had died in the show."

=== Sexual consent ===
Yorke confirmed that when Ruby returns, she would be involved in one of the show's "biggest storylines". Two months later, it was announced that Ruby would be raped as part of a sexual consent storyline. The plot begins when Ruby and Stacey attend a party together following her return. The following day, Ruby confides in Stacey that she has been raped, although the perpetrator has an alternative view of the night. Duncan Lindsay of the Metro confirmed that the perpetrator would not be a regular character. It was reported that the attack would not be shown, but the show's research team worked with charity Rape Crisis England and Wales to accurately portray the storyline. Yorke said that the story would "challenge the stereotyping and myths that can surround sexual violence and consent". He described the plot as challenging and emotional and added, "we hope that by EastEnders tackling this issue we can raise awareness about an incredibly important issue." Lytton was aware of the responsibility attached to the storyline and felt proud to portray the issue. She hoped to "end the many misconceptions surrounding sexual violence." Yvonne Traynor, the CEO of Rape Crisis South London, commented, "EastEnders have taken this responsibility very seriously and ensured that their portrayal of sexual violence has been thoroughly researched and is based on realism which is, sadly, so prevalent in our country today."

On 19 November 2018, a special episode of EastEnders focusing on Ruby's sexual assault was announced. The episode is entirely set in The Queen Victoria pub and showcases different opinions on Ruby's assault after it is featured in a local newspaper. The episode sees multiple residents discussing attitudes to consent and the assault without knowing that Ruby is the victim, while Ruby listens to the variation in opinions. Lytton liked the concept of the episode since she knew many people with different views on consent. She felt that it was important to display the alternative outlooks on the situations. The episode takes place after Ruby's rapists, Ross Swinden (Ossian Luke) and Matt Clarkson (Mitchell Hunt), are charged for rape. At the end of the episode, Ross and Matt's friend, Glenn Neyland (Todd Von Joel), publicly accuses her of lying so she reveals herself as the rape victim, shocking the local residents. The special episode is filmed differently to normal episodes and uses a different director to the rest of the week's episodes. Lytton realised the episode would be not be a regular one when she noticed it had a different director. On the episode, the actress commented, "It's not what you normally see on EastEnders."

=== Return (2024) ===
On 3 September 2024, it was announced that Lytton would return to the soap for her third stint. It was revealed that Lytton had already begun filming prior to the announcement. Her reintroduction was set to be a "prolonged stint", with the character debuting before the show's 40th anniversary. Discussing her return, Lytton said she was "thrilled" to return and explore what Ruby had done in the three years since her departure. She added: "I've always loved playing Ruby as there is never a dull moment and I cannot wait for everyone to see what Ruby has in store". Executive producer Chris Clenshaw commented: "I'm delighted to welcome Louisa Lytton back to the role of Ruby Allen. Ruby's departure from Walford left many unanswered questions for Martin and Stacey, and her return is sure to unearth a whole heap of drama for her character and all those involved". On 10 November 2024, Lytton promised that Ruby's return would be "dramatic", telling The Sun "she comes in and ruffles feathers, does the wrong thing and says the wrong thing". The actress teased that, as Ruby would return as a mother, which she commented gave her character a purpose, she now knew where her priorities were to a greater extent, despite still making mistakes. Ruby returned in episode 7015, broadcast 18 November 2024.

== Storylines ==
=== 2005–2006 ===
Ruby arrives in Walford, having run away from boarding school to look for her father, Johnny Allen (Billy Murray). On her arrival, she is befriended by Stacey Slater (Lacey Turner), who grills Ruby about her family. After storming out of the café where they are talking, she is mugged by a vagrant in Bridge Street, who grabs hold of Ruby's coat and steals her mobile phone. She is then almost run over by Tina Stewart's (Charlotte Avery) taxi. Ruby feels that Johnny is pushing her away and reminds him that he only saved her by accident when their house caught fire, as he was actually trying to save her sister, Scarlet. Scarlet and their mother, Stephanie, died in the fire in March 2004. Ruby is livid when Johnny introduces her to his mistress Tina, who turns out to be the woman who had almost run her over, but later accepts the relationship. Ruby overhears Peggy Mitchell (Barbara Windsor) telling people that Johnny is a violent, murdering bully. Ruby confronts him and he denies it. She knows he is lying and stays with Stacey initially and then Peggy at Pat Evans' (Pam St Clement) house.

Ruby catches Johnny having an affair with Amy (Nina Fry) while he is engaged to Tina. She tells Tina and Tina leaves. Ruby eventually forgives her father and moves back in with him but later moves in with boyfriend Juley Smith (Joseph Kpobie), to whom she lost her virginity. Johnny doesn't take kindly to this, as he has already warned Juley about Ruby. Ruby defends Juley and even turns against her dad for him, but she is devastated to learn that Phil Mitchell (Steve McFadden) has been paying Juley to sleep with her as part of his feud with Johnny. Ruby feels thankful when Dennis Rickman (Nigel Harman) helps with her things as she moves in with Juley, Ruby drops her things outside her house whilst walking to her flat. She is upset when Johnny is brutally beaten up on New Year's Eve during a clash with Dennis. On New Year's Day 2006, Ruby thinks that Phil attacked him, unless it wasn't him. When Dennis dies on New Year's Eve, Ruby is unaware that Johnny had him killed. She reacts by getting drunk and collapsing on the floor. Phil, who has broken into Johnny's house to have it out with him, takes her to hospital. Juley attempts to get Ruby back, and she eventually agrees to try again. However, she realises that she cannot trust him when she found herself questioning his phone calls.

Ruby discovers that Johnny is an alcoholic in "Get Johnny Week" and she leaves him to Phil. She and Grant Mitchell (Ross Kemp) have a heart to heart, and Grant discovers that Phil paid Juley to sleep with Ruby. Grant is furious and burst into Johnny's office where Phil is holding Johnny until he confesses to Dennis's murder. This gives Johnny a chance to get away. There is a big chase, which results in Danny Moon (Jake Maskall) handcuffing the brothers and marching them into the forest. He is about to kill Grant when Jake Moon (Joel Beckett) shoots him instead and kills him. Ruby persuades Johnny to hand himself in, and that she will never forgive him if he doesn't. To please her, he hands himself in, and he is imprisoned for the murders of both Dennis and Andy Hunter (Michael Higgs). Ruby promises to visit Johnny whilst he is in prison.

When Ruby returns to Walford, Charlie Slater (Derek Martin) allows her to move in with him and the Slaters. Ruby later discovers that Jake had murdered Danny, and she is furious with him. Jake becomes obsessed with Ruby's welfare, and takes over the running of her club until she turns 18 in October. Ruby withdraws £2000 for a holiday, but decides to return it and is mugged by Juley in the process. Ruby then begins a relationship with Sean Slater (Robert Kazinsky), Stacey's brother, unaware that he is a womaniser who is only dating her for her money. Jake is furious when he discovers Sean's plans, and he does all he can to persuade Ruby to leave him. Jake lets Johnny know about Ruby's relationship with Sean, and informs him about Sean's plans, so Johnny calls for Sean to visit him in prison. On Ruby's 18th birthday in October 2006, Sean meets Johnny in the prison visiting room, and he aggravates Johnny with plans on what he was going to do to Ruby. Johnny is furious, and plans revenge. That night, Ruby is vexed by Jake's interference which leads to an argument, calling him a "murderer" and a "psychopath", which resulted in Jake departing Walford to start anew out of the country – thereby leaving Ruby to fend for herself. That same night on her birthday, Ruby finds out that Johnny has died from a heart attack after the confrontation with Sean in prison.

Ruby is left heartbroken following her father's death, and is even more so when Sean lacks comfort and support. On the day of Johnny's funeral, Ruby goes missing and Sean finds her – slumped behind the desk in the Scarlet office – with a bottle of vodka. Later, she speaks to Pat who made her think, by saying that her father was normally right about people, including Jake and Sean. Sean later proposes to Ruby, stating he has genuine feelings for her, and she accepts. Later, Ruby learns from Stacey that Sean had cheated on her with Preeti Choraria (Babita Pohoomull) and she barges into Tanya Branning's (Jo Joyner) salon to threaten her. She makes Sean vow to be true to her, but when she tells his mother, Jean Slater (Gillian Wright), that he is back in Walford, he angrily breaks up with her, throwing her father's ashes in her face. Ruby later leaves Walford in the back of a taxi, having fallen out with Stacey once again.

=== 2018–2021 ===
After twelve years, Ruby returns to Walford and reunites with Stacey at the E20. Ruby attends the school reunion of Stacey's husband, Martin Fowler (James Bye), where Ruby flirts with Martin's friend Ross Swinden (Ossian Luke). The next day, Ruby tells Stacey that she went back to Ross' house afterwards and had sex with him, but woke up with Martin's other friend, Matt Clarkson (Mitchell Hunt), on top of her. Stacey tells Ruby that she was raped by Matt and eventually Ruby reports this to the police. Ruby moves into a flat on Albert Square. A photograph emerges of Ruby kissing Matt in the club the night before and Ruby is devastated when the police receive it. However, both Matt and Ross are charged with rape. It is then reported in the local newspaper, though none of the people involved are named, but Ruby starts to get tagged in online photos taken in the E20 that night with comments implying Ruby's rape allegation is false. Ruby suffers from online bullying, and considers dropping the case altogether. She eventually continues with it, and goes on several dates with Jay Brown (Jamie Borthwick). She struggles to open up to him because of her experiences.

In February 2019, Ruby is hosting a party for Habiba (Rukku Nahar) and Iqra Ahmed (Priya Davdra) to coincide with the opening of their restaurant. She feels sorry for Mel Owen (Tamzin Outhwaite) following her son Hunter's (Charlie Winter) prison sentencing, and encourages her to come along. The night goes smoothly, until the police turn up and arrest Ruby for sexual assault on her former employee Blake Turner (Makir Ahmed). After she is arrested on suspicion of sexual assault on Blake, they meet to discuss what happened. She says they had consensual sex but he says that as she was his boss, when she came onto him at the office Christmas party, he felt obliged to have sex with her and then date her for fear of being sacked, which he was when their relationship ended. She says she had to sack someone and he was not up to the job and she asks if this accusation is revenge for her firing him. He admits he was bad at the job but says that was why he had to go along with her advances. He leaves but she follows him and asks if someone put him up to the accusation, as her rapists are due in court soon. He says his girlfriend did, as she helped him see what happened for what it really was. He says she has to realise that she cannot get away with what she said, so she apologises and says she did not know that he did not want to have sex with her. She tells him to do what he feels is right. However, Ruby later finds out that Blake has dropped the allegation.

Ruby's trial is coming up, and she begins to fear that it will not deliver justice. So thinks about how her father might handle the situation, and decides to try for revenge. She lures Matt and Ross back to the Square by pretending to be another girl. Ross comes to her apartment, and while confronting him, she manages to drug him. Meanwhile, Ross has sent Matt a picture of Ruby along with the message "Round Two?" The message is seen by Martin, who is catching up with Matt at the time, and finally realises that what Ruby said is true. Him and Stacey rush to Ruby's apartment, where she is preparing to castrate Ross. They convince her to trust in the Courts, and Martin suggests that they hand Ross' phone in to the police, as it contains incriminating text messages between Ross and Matt. Ruby decides against this, knowing that it would also incriminate her for what she tried to do to Ross. The trial proceeds, and is an emotional experience for both Ruby and Stacey, who support each other throughout. Matt eventually breaks on the stand, admitting that he does not know whether Ruby had consented or not. Matt and Ross are found guilty and sentenced to ten years in prison. After Stacey encourages her to move on with her life, Ruby decides to start a relationship with Jay. Whilst Ruby and Jay are on and off, Jay's ex-girlfriend Lola Pearce (Danielle Harold) returns to Walford and almost begins a relationship with him. Billy convinces Ruby to let Lola work with her and Ruby agrees, not knowing about her identity. They struggle to get on and Ruby eventually sacks her. Ruby is reunited with Sean at The Queen Victoria public house and she slaps him as revenge for throwing her father's ashes in her face.

In the summer, Ruby starts dating Max Branning (Jake Wood). Max wanted their relationship to be kept a secret from Stacey, but Ruby was unaware as to why. One evening, Stacey delivers some food to his doorstep, but is gobsmacked to find Ruby with him. Max then decides to tell Ruby about his sexual past with Stacey, and she is left stunned, but decides to stay with him. Stacey starts to feel betrayed by Ruby for sleeping with Max, but their friendship is not affected. Max and Ruby's relationship doesn't survive however, with Max confessing to her that he was going through a "midlife crisis". However, they later reunite.

In November 2019, Mel decides to sell her half of the E20, and offers Ruby the chance to buy both hers and Sharon Watts' (Letitia Dean) shares. Mel's blackmail of Sharon over her affair with and pregnancy by Keanu Taylor (Danny Walters) ensures Sharon reluctantly sells to Ruby. However, Ruby is concerned about Mel's mental health and assures Lisa Fowler (Lucy Benjamin) that she will only buy the club from Mel if she is definitely in a fit state to sell, which she eventually does, renaming the club "Ruby's". Ruby later sleeps with Martin and tells Max straight away, explaining that they are in an open relationship. Ruby befriends Whitney Dean (Shona McGarty) during Stacey's absence, and Ruby is shocked by Whitney's talent of dress-making. Whitney explains to Ruby how her ex-boyfriend Leo King (Tom Wells) had locked her in a hotel room when she discovered his true identity. Ruby has a heart-to-heart with Whitney and encourages her to feel less sympathetic towards him. Ruby later lets Dotty Cotton (Milly Zero) and Vinny Panesar (Shiv Jalota) deal NOS canisters on the club premises.

Ruby hires Martin as the new bouncer of her club, making Max jealous. As Ruby and Martin become closer, Ruby leaves Max. Ruby later begins a relationship with Martin and is shocked to find that somebody is stealing her money. Due to financial difficulty, Ruby stages a robbery with Vinny which results in Martin being seriously injured by Vinny. Ruby discovers that Stacey is the culprit behind her missing money; as revenge against Ruby for dating Martin, and she plans to report her to the police, but is stopped by Martin who only wants Stacey to stay, so he can see his children. Soon after in October 2020, Ruby and Martin announce their marriage, much to the shock of Stacey. Ruby hosts a celebration at the club and forces Stacey to join, leading to a confrontation when Ruby continues to belittle Stacey. They almost make amends until Stacey's daughter Lily Slater (Lillia Turner) reveals all the horrible things that Stacey had said about Ruby. Upset, Ruby arranges for Stacey to be attacked by a hooded figure outside the club. Ruby and Stacey's rivalry continues when Ruby is jealous that Martin is spending Christmas Day with Stacey and the Slaters. Unbeknown to Ruby, Stacey makes a pass at Martin but is rejected. A jealous Ruby accuses Stacey of plotting to win back Martin and warns her to stay away. During a conversation with Martin's friend Kush, he tells Ruby that Stacey is still interested in Martin and is scheming to win him back. As revenge on New Years Eve Ruby offers Kush money to run away with his and Stacey's son Arthur. She then claims to be pregnant so to keep Martin with her. In February 2021, Stacey discovers that Ruby was the perpetrator behind the robbery, Stacey's attack and Kush taking Arthur, which leads to a confrontation at the club where Ruby finds out she really is pregnant. Days later, Ruby and Martin want to take the kids on holiday and making Stacey angry about the lack of communication and worried if the kids will not return to her.

After visiting a clinic and stealing another woman's baby scan to protect her lies, Ruby suffers a miscarriage. During a further confrontation with Stacey at the club, she trips and falls on the stairs. She uses the fall as the explanation for losing the baby and accuses Stacey of pushing her. Finding CCTV footage from the club which appears to show this happening, she deletes the footage from another camera showing the truth and presents it to the police. Jean Slater (Gillian Wright) tries to persuade her to drop the charges, telling her that she believes she has terminal cancer and may not live to see Stacey released, but Ruby presses ahead regardless. Stacey is subsequently convicted of assault and sentenced to a year in prison. Her children end up having to move in with Ruby and Martin because Jean is very stressed, and Ruby uses them regularly to get out of difficult situations such as Lily as she knows the lies about Ruby so in revenge cuts up Ruby's mum's wedding dress. Ruby and Martin continue trying for a baby, but she learns that she has endometriosis which could affect her fertility. After suffering a second miscarriage, Jean offers support to Ruby and the pair begin to grow close. Isaac Baptiste (Stevie Basaula), who is suffering from schizophrenia, becomes obsessed with Ruby, convinced that her father was responsible for his brother Paul Trueman's (Gary Beadle) death and that she is covering it up. Ruby's guilt over sending Stacey to prison increases as she and Jean spend time together, and she starts sending large amounts of money to Jean to support her. During an appointment she finally confesses the truth to Jean, and she warns Ruby that she needs to confess the truth to Martin or she will. Ruby subsequently discovers that Jean has a cannabis farm in her garage that was set up by Big Mo before she left and tips off the police, leading to her arrest before she can tell Martin the truth. However, Martin discovers the lies after Lily is caught with weed and knowing about suspecting Jean's cancer is back. Martin visits Stacey in prison and learns about much of Ruby's deceit and is ordered to sort Ruby out or she will kill her. When he confronts her about it, she confesses everything to him including the robbery and about how she manipulated Martin by twisting the truth and how she silenced Stacey, Kush and Lily but also reveals that she is pregnant again. However Martin doesn't believe her as he encourages her to go to the police station with him. But Jean sets Ruby up by accusing her of being behind the cannabis farm to the police and threatens her, resulting in Ruby being arrested after Lily's drugs are found in the house and subsequently pleading guilty. She later sells her house to Sharon, applies for a divorce from Martin and leaves him and the kids homeless and without a job and all bank accounts shut down. She leaves Dotty in charge of the club before selling it off-screen to Sam Mitchell (Kim Medcalf), the following year.

=== 2024–2025 ===
In September 2024, Martin's friend Sharon Watts (Letitia Dean) learns that Ruby was the cellmate of Chrissie Watts (Tracy-Ann Oberman) but she was moved after giving birth to Martin's child. In November 2024, Sharon asks for Phil's help to find Ruby. Phil hires Johnny Carter (Charlie Suff) who reveals that Ruby is living in Essex with her son, whom she had given birth to in 2022. Ruby returns to Albert Square to confront Martin after Johnny's private detective steals their son, Roman's birth certificate, which Sharon gives to Martin. During an argument, Ruby tells Martin that she had put Roman up for adoption soon after his birth. However, when Ruby leaves, Martin and Stacey follow her and find her at a hospital with Roman. Ruby reveals that Roman was admitted due to autoimmune hepatitis, but Martin learns that he had also had a paracetamol overdose. Initially, Ruby prevents Martin from seeing Roman but relents and tries to call a truce with Stacey. However, when she discovers that Martin is planning on battling her for custody of Roman, she prevents him from seeing Roman again, as revenge. Ruby and Martin put their differences aside when Martin emotionally supports Ruby and agrees to donate his liver to help Roman. They become closer and share a kiss, before resuming their relationship. However, during Honey (Emma Barton) and Billy Mitchell's (Perry Fenwick) second wedding reception, the Queen Vic explodes after a car crashes into it. Martin helps Jean, Lily, Ruby and several others to escape, but over Ruby's objections, he goes back in to help Stacey, who is trapped underneath some rubble. As Jean and Ruby wait outside with other Albert Square residents, they hear Stacey's devastated screams, confirming that Martin has died after suffering massive injuries in saving her, leaving her and Ruby distraught.

The next day, Ruby, still upset and blaming Stacey for causing Martin's death as he went back to save her, is unsure how to approach Stacey after seeing her being comforted by other residents. When Zack Hudson (James Farrar) checks in on Ruby, he tells her that Martin would have come back for her if she had been the one that was trapped, and advises her that Martin would not want her or Stacey to be at odds over his death. However, Ruby admits to feeling insecure, knowing that Stacey was with Martin in his final moments while she never got to be there herself. The next day, Ruby works up the courage to visit Stacey, and asks her what happened in Martin's final moments. Stacey, knowing that Martin had confessed his love for her but unwilling to hurt Ruby by revealing this, assures Ruby that Martin did love her in his final moments. Ruby thanks Stacey for telling her this, but insists on being involved with planning Martin's funeral, knowing that Stacey has her friends and family to support her while she has no one to share her own grief with. Stacey, her daughter Lily Slater (Lillia Turner) and Martin's ex-wife Sonia Fowler (Natalie Cassidy) go to Ruby's house to help her plan the funeral together, and while they tenatively plan an informal get-together event in remembrance of Martin, they quickly clash when Ruby suggests ideas that clash with Martin's personality; while Stacey does not contribute any ideas. The next night, Stacey refuses to go to the event, while Lily and Jean attend and find it to be a much somber event. When Lily allows the guests to change the music, Ruby begins to panic and soon does a speech on how Martin will never get to see Roman grow up and how they had plans as a family together. This causes a furious Lily to yell at Ruby and blurt out that Martin had in fact loved Stacey.

An agitated Ruby storms off and heads to Stacey's house to confront her, and when Stacey continues to deny it, Ruby angrily leaves the funeral planning to Stacey, saying it is her fault that Martin died. Feeling guilty, Stacey sees that Ruby has a right to be angry with her, that she would have been angry at Ruby herself if it was the other way round, and that they both could have been better off not knowing how Martin felt about either of them. Stacey meets up with Ruby with a peace offering and asks her to rejoin the funeral planning and put their feud aside for Martin's and their kids' sake. Stacey emphasises that Martin was committed to Ruby and Roman when he died, and that he may not get the send-off he deserves without Ruby's help. However, shortly afterwards, Stacey leaves Walford temporarily to stay with Sean, causing Ruby to struggle with the funeral planning. On the day of Martin's funeral, Stacey shows up drunk to the service, and Stacey and Ruby clash over his love for Stacey. Later that night, Martin's stall is set on fire, destroying his memory. Priya Nandra-Hart (Sophie Khan Levy) tells residents that Ruby burned Martin's stall, and after a showdown on the square, Stacey plans to report her to the police, but discovers that Lily was responsible. Stacey refuses to report Lily to the police so she will not go to prison and leave her daughter Charli Slater, much to Ruby's annoyance. After being shunned by the community, Ruby sells the stall to Ian and decides to return to Essex. She visits Martin's grave with Roman, and Stacey joins her. Stacey begs Ruby to stay in Walford and offers to vouch for her innocence, but Ruby declines, preferring to let the community believe she was responsible. She also tells Stacey that she is giving Roman the surname of Fowler in honour of his father's origins, and gives Stacey a memorial plaque for Martin. Stacey and Ruby reconcile again, and Ruby says goodbye, promising to keep in touch.

== Reception ==
For her portrayal of Ruby, Lytton was nominated for Best Soap Actor (Female) at the 2018 Digital Spy Reader Awards; she came in fourth place with 10.5% of the total vote. Her sexual consent storyline was also nominated under the "Best Soap Storyline" category; it came in fifth place with 9.7% of the total vote. Lytton received a positive response from the audience about the storyline. Female viewers contacted the actress to let her know about when they related to the storyline. The decision to use Ruby as the character in the sexual consent story was criticised following the announcement of the story, although Sophie Dainty, writing for entertainment website Digital Spy, thought it was a good choice as the characters and viewers would be unbiased when deciding whom to believe. Dainty praised EastEnders for exploring an "important social issue" with Ruby's sexual consent storyline and the "extensive" research it undertook when developing the story. She also commented, "EastEnders bosses weren't wrong when they said it would be one of the biggest stories of the year". Katie Baillie of the Metro enjoyed Lytton's performance during the storyline and opined that she deserved an accolade as she did not appear to be acting, rather living the experience herself.

"Granted, EastEnders is not the first soap to tell a story of this kind, [...] but, in choosing to make this an issue-driven story, rather than a character-led one, EastEnders has cleverly managed to find its own place with Ruby's situation, during a time where issue-based storylines are rightfully becoming all the more prevalent."

— Sophie Dainty (Digital Spy) on Ruby's sexual consent storyline (2018)

Critics and viewers alike enjoyed the special episode about Ruby's consent storyline, describing it as "authentic, unflinching, and thoroughly thought-provoking", "an episode we won't be forgetting in a while", "one of the soap's all-time classics", "one of the most poignant [episodes] in the history of EastEnders", "nothing short of spectacular", and "brave and ambitious". Dainty (Digital Spy) also said that at times, the episode was "uncomfortable to watch" and "slightly unconventional". Her colleague, Justin Harp, dubbed the episode an "emotional rollercoaster that viewers will not soon forget". Dainty and Baillie (Metro) praised Lytton's performance during the rape storyline, with Dainty dubbing it "brilliant" and Baillie saying that it has "you going through a roller coaster of emotions". Dainty described Ruby's speech at the end of the episode as "powerful and very public", while Baillie said that it leaves the audience "with a fire in your belly ready to stand beside her and fight". Viewers of the episode also enjoyed Lytton's performance, calling it "phenomenal" and "incredible". Baillie noted that the episode is "filled with moments that will knock the wind out of you with some incredible one liners that catch you off guard". Dainty thought that the special episode "unpicked and unravelled" each opinion of rape and consent. The reporter believed that after the episode, there was "more ground to be covered in the aftermath". Baillie enjoyed the writing of Ruby as someone who is upset and annoyed, yet not worried and frightened. She added that although Ruby is teary, her tears "take not one ounce away from her strength".

Upon the announcement of Ruby's return, Laura Denby of Radio Times deemed the role of Ruby "iconic".
