= Vicki Fowler =

Fictional character from EastEnders

- EastEnders character
- Alice Haig as Vicki Fowler (2025)
- Portrayed by: Emma Herry (1986–1988); Samantha Leigh Martin (1988–1995); Scarlett Alice Johnson (2003–2004); Alice Haig (2025–present)
- Duration: 1986–1995, 2003–2004, 2025–present
- First appearance: Episode 133; 27 May 1986
- Introduced by: Julia Smith and Tony Holland (1986); Louise Berridge (2003); Chris Clenshaw (2025)
- Scarlett Alice Johnson as Vicki Fowler (2004)
In-universe information
- Occupation: Waitress
- Family: Watts/Fowler/Beale
- Father: Den Watts
- Mother: Michelle Fowler
- Stepfather: Lofty Holloway; Tim Andrews
- Stepmother: Angie Watts; Chrissie Watts
- Half-brothers: Dennis Rickman; Mark Fowler
- Half-sisters: Sharon Watts (adoptive)
- Husband: Ross Marshall (2026–present)
- Stepsons: Joel Marshall
- Grandfathers: Arthur Fowler; Dennis Watts
- Grandmothers: Pauline Fowler
- Uncles: Mark Fowler; Martin Fowler
- Nephews: Dennis Rickman Jnr; Albie Watts (adoptive)
- First cousins: Bex Fowler; Hope Fowler
- Other relatives: Lou Beale; Pete Beale; Ian Beale; Peter Beale; Louie Beale

Vicki Fowler is a fictional character from the BBC soap opera EastEnders, originally portrayed by Emma Herry (1986–1988), Samantha Leigh Martin (1988–1995) and Scarlett Alice Johnson (2003–2004). Two decades later, the role was recast to Alice Haig, with Vicki returning on 31 March 2025. She is the daughter of Michelle Fowler (Susan Tully/Jenna Russell) and Den Watts (Leslie Grantham).

Vicki was conceived in a controversial teenage pregnancy storyline that generated significant press attention. Exploiting a whodunit element, viewers were initially unaware of the father's identity, leading to widespread speculation until it was revealed in episode 66, broadcast in October 1985, that Den Watts was the father. Written by series co-creator and script editor Tony Holland and directed by co-creator and producer Julia Smith, the episode was considered a landmark moment in the show's history. Early suspects included Ian Beale (Adam Woodyatt) and Kelvin Carpenter (Paul J. Medford), but the mystery was solved when Den's dog Roly was seen jumping from his car at the secret meeting point, confirming Den as the father. Vicki was written out of the series in October 1995 following the departure of Tully. Following an eight-year absence, the character was reintroduced in January 2003 by executive producer Louise Berridge.

In her first full-time stint, portrayed by Johnson, Vicki's storylines included returning to Walford as a rebellious teenager after years living in America with her mother Michelle, struggling with her identity as Den Watts's daughter, forming close friendships with Spencer Moon (Christopher Parker) and Kelly Taylor (Brooke Kinsella), having brief relationships with both Spencer and Ash Ferreira (Raji James), working at Angie's Den under her father’s management, clashing with Den over his manipulative behaviour, and leaving Walford once again to live in America. This stint formed part of a wider effort to rebuild the Watts family, which had been central to EastEnders during the 1980s. In August 2004, Johnson announced her departure from the show, with Vicki's final scenes airing on 25 December 2004. Her portrayal received mixed reviews from critics, with some highlighting the inconsistency of her American accent.

In her second full-time stint, with the character now portrayed by Haig, Vicki's storylines have included returning to Walford with her new partner Ross Marshall (Alex Walkinshaw) and his son Joel (Max Murray), reuniting with Sharon following Martin's death, revealing that she cheated on Spencer with Ross and that she came back to ask Sharon and Ian for money to pay back the family of a girl whom Joel sexually assaulted in Australia, blackmailing Bernadette Taylor (Clair Norris) after discovering her embezzlement from the Panesars, feuding with Zoe Slater (Michelle Ryan) after her return to the Square, clashing with Joel over his growing hostility towards women which results in her ultimately being viciously attacked and left for dead by him following his descent into online radicalisation through the manosphere, having an affair with Zack Hudson (James Farrar), and marrying Ross.

== Creation and development ==
=== Conception and childhood characterisation ===
The conception of Vicki Fowler in 1985 was one of the first controversial storylines featured in EastEnders since its inception that February, as it involved the pregnancy of a schoolgirl, Michelle Fowler (Susan Tully). Exploiting a whodunit angle, viewers were not initially told who was the father, and press interest in the fledgling show escalated as journalists attempted to guess. The audience finally discovered his identity in October 1985 on episode 66. Written by series co-creator/script-editor Tony Holland and directed by co-creator/producer Julia Smith, it was considered a landmark episode in the show's history. Four possible suspects were seen leaving the Square early in the episode: Tony Carpenter (Oscar James), Ali Osman (Nejdet Salih), Andy O'Brien (Ross Davidson), and Den Watts (Leslie Grantham). As Michelle waited by their rendezvous point, a car pulled up and the fluffy white legs of the soap landlord's poodle Roly leapt out of a car and gave it all away: Den had fathered Michelle's baby. After this storyline the programme started to appear in newspaper cartoons as it moved more and more into the public mainstream.

Baby Emma Herry originated the role and played Vicki until 1988, when her parents moved to Scotland. The role was recast to Samantha Leigh Martin, who learned to call Tully "Mummy Shell" (short for Michelle) and referred to Letitia Dean, who played her mum's best friend, as "Daddy Sharon". Tully has commented, "What's lovely about working with Samantha is that she's always happy. When it comes to work, she knows it's playing a pretend game, she knows my real name but she knows to call me 'Mummy Shell' when the cameras are running. If she isn't involved for a couple of weeks, I like to visit her at home, so she's always relaxed with me." Tully worried about this when it came to filming scenes in 1989 where Vicki contracted meningitis and was hospitalised and placed in an incubator with tubes attached to her body. Tully said, "[Samantha] has seen me in all kinds of situations but I didn't know how she'd cope if I cried over her". At Tully's suggestion, the BBC built a hospital room with minimal equipment and a consultant was present to make sure the BBC had the details correct and that neither the viewers nor Samantha would be too distressed. Tully insisted that the child was not present when she had to film scenes of Michelle sobbing over the incubator.

In 1995, after 9 years onscreen being featured in various plot lines such as kidnapping, Vicki was written out of EastEnders, moving to America with Michelle.

=== Recast (2003) ===
In 2002, executive producer Louise Berridge decided to reintroduce the character 8 years after she had last appeared. Auditions were held to cast the role to a professional actor; however, auditionees were not informed which character they were auditioning for. The first audition was a group workshop of 30 auditionees, who were asked to perform improvisations. After whittling down potential actors from 500 to 4, the second stage of the audition process was an interview with EastEnders' casting director. The auditionees were asked to perform a monologue in front of a camera and do a screen test with one of the actors already in the show, Christopher Parker, who played Spencer Moon.

17-year-old actress Scarlett Alice Johnson was cast: "At the second audition they gave me a monologue to read, but they'd been really careful about it. They hadn't said what the character's name was, they didn't give away anything in the monologue that might tell me who I was auditioning for. So I didn't know until I got the part who I was going to be playing—I'd been guessing for ages!" Asked how she felt when she knew she was playing Vicki Fowler, a character linked to the show's early history who is the daughter of 2 prominent original characters, Johnson said: "I felt very honoured, but it was quite scary. I knew there'd be a lot of people out there with expectations of what she'd be like. But it's good fun actually. It means you don't have to introduce yourself to everyone. You can really play with that [...] My family are EastEnders addicts, we've watched it our whole lives. I remember the first Vicki, I remember Michelle and I definitely remember Dirty Den! My knowledge of the show really helped a lot, because I didn't have to do any research into the character. When I joined the show, I felt like I was meeting the actors for a second time. I'd already met them in my home on TV, then I had to actually meet them in real life!" The character made her reappearance in January 2003, turning up unexpectedly at her grandmother Pauline's (Wendy Richard) house.

To signify the character's eight years living in America, Johnson was required to use an American accent while playing Vicki. She was given a voice coach and a sheet of American phrases to practice weekly. She commented, "It is hard work, but it's becoming second nature now. As soon as I know that I'm Vicki, the accent just comes with it." After 6 months in the role, Vicki dropped the American accent. Johnson explained the reason for the change in 2004: "The producers knew that I had to have an American accent when I came into the show because my character had been living in America but it's not the kind of accent that you'd want to have for a long time on a show like EastEnders. It's not something that's going to fit in for a long period of time. What would have been perfect would have been to have it gradually fade out, but as you film 8 episodes at a time, this would be nigh on impossible. The decision was made that in the story Vicki was coming to terms with the fact that she wanted to live in London so therefore she was going to make a conscious effort to fit in with everyone around her and blend in with London life."

The reintroduction of Vicki was part of the producers' plan to reform the Watts family, including the resurrection of Vicki's father Den, who had been presumed dead for 14 years. Discussing working with Grantham, who played Vicki's "iconic" father Den, Johnson said, "I was 2 when he left EastEnders [in 1989] so I never witnessed the hype surrounding him. I'm very aware of the legend. How could I not be? My only concern was that he should take me seriously [and] It's been fabulous. I can't wait for our scenes to be shown. They're really edgy and no one does edgy better than Leslie. It's been a massive challenge but I think the results are incredibly hard-hitting. EastEnders is becoming more like a serial drama than a soap. It's so well-written."

=== Personality ===
Vicki has been described as a "little madam" and a rebel. An EastEnders source commented, "Vicki has inherited a lot of her dad Den's traits – she is going to be a right handful". Johnson has said, "Everyone loves to hate her, but I rather like that. I'd be more upset if she was nondescript. At least I provoke a passionate response in people. It's great being a bad girl."

=== Departure (2004) ===
In August 2004, the BBC announced that Johnson had decided to quit her role as Vicki. She commented, "I've had a really good two years, enjoyed all the experiences but it's time to move on". Johnson filmed her final scenes in October and her departure coincided with that of Vicki's half-sister, Sharon. Vicki departed on the Christmas Day episode of 2004. 12.3 million viewers watched the episodes that involved the Watts family's disbandment. Media reports claimed that there were plans to bring Vicki back the following year, played by a new actress; this proved to be false. Her character was notably absent at the funerals of Vicki's father Den in September 2005, her brother Dennis Rickman (Nigel Harman) in January 2006, and her grandmother Pauline in January 2007.

Following her departure from EastEnders, Johnson was more candid in her reasons for leaving: "I've had a great time but it got to the point where I was sat in bed at night thinking: 'Tomorrow will my character be crying, getting drunk or having an argument?'. It soon became physically exhausting and draining [...] I don't think the producers were very happy when I said I wanted to leave. I was still very new and they had just set up the new Watts dynasty but no-one could have made me change my mind. When I said to the producers I wanted to go they told me they might have to recast Vicki. I don't mind. Life goes on and EastEnders goes on. I wouldn't want to go back at the moment – but never say never."

=== Recast and return (2025) ===
In February 2025, following the show's 40th anniversary celebrations in which the character's uncle Martin Fowler (James Bye) was killed off, it was announced that Vicki would return to the soap after 21 years, with the role being recast to Alice Haig. Upon being cast in the role, Haig said "I am so excited. I have always watched the show, and I was born in February 1985, so I'm the same age as EastEnders! It’s so cool to be playing a character like Vicki - we think we know her, but a lot has changed. I can’t wait for all the Albert Square drama ahead." [sic]. The character was set to return alongside a new family, including Vicki's boyfriend Ross Marshall (Alex Walkinshaw) and his son Joel (Max Murray). It was also reported that Johnson was originally invited back to reprise the character but rejected the role, wishing Haig the best.

== Storylines ==
=== 1986–1995 ===
16-year-old Michelle Fowler (Susan Tully) gets pregnant in 1985 after a one-night stand with her best friend Sharon Watts' (Letitia Dean) adoptive father, Den Watts (Leslie Grantham). Her family decide Michelle should have an abortion but she refuses, keeping the baby but keeping the father's name a secret. Vicki, named in honour of her great-grandparents Lou Beale (Anna Wing) and Lou's late husband Albert (Gary Olsen), is born in 1986 and Den is allowed to hold her but he and Michelle agree that he should keep his distance so nobody guesses he is her father. Michelle raises Vicki with her fiancé, Lofty Holloway (Tom Watt), whom she marries after jilting him at the altar, although Den provides for Vicki secretly. After Sue Osman (Sandy Ratcliff) realises that she has had a phantom pregnancy, she is devastated and suggests to Michelle that she lets her and Ali Osman (Nejdet Salih) adopt Vicki, which infuriates Michelle. Vicki's grandmother, Pauline Fowler (Wendy Richard), realises Den is Vicki's father when she sees him give money to Michelle and slaps him. Lofty begins to pressure Michelle to let him adopt Vicki and have another child, but their marriage soon breaks down after Michelle has an abortion and Michelle refuses to name Vicki's father upon Lofty's departure. When Den is shot and presumed dead, Michelle tells Sharon that Vicki is her half-sister and Sharon is devastated whilst Arthur is furious. Vicki survives meningitis but Dr. Harold Legg (Leonard Fenton) fails to diagnose it, reuniting Michelle and Sharon.

Michelle decides to go on the run with Clyde Tavernier (Steven Woodcock) after he is accused of murdering Eddie Royle (Michael Melia), taking Vicki and Kofi Tavernier (Marcel Smith), Clyde's son, with them. Michelle and Clyde are caught by the police when trying to flee the country and Vicki and Kofi are sent to a children's home, but are later collected by their grandmothers. Vicki is kidnapped when an old woman, Audrey Whittingham (Shirley Dixon), takes her from outside her school. A national police investigation is launched and Vicki is returned home safely. When Michelle is shot by Dougie Briggs (Max Gold), Vicki discovers she is Sharon's adoptive half-sister when she stays with Sharon and her husband, Grant Mitchell (Ross Kemp) and the following day, Sharon tells Vicki about her father, which infuriates Michelle. The truth about Vicki's paternity spreads and Michelle's aunt, Kathy Beale (Gillian Taylforth), is upset about not being told by Michelle herself, finding out from Mandy Salter (Nicola Stapleton). In October 1995, Michelle and 9-year-old Vicki leave Walford for Birmingham, Alabama, in the United States.

=== 2003–2004 ===
A teenage Vicki returns to Walford in February 2003 when she runs away from home. She has been arguing regularly with Michelle and it is decided that she can stay in Walford. After clashing with her grandmother Pauline, Vicki moves in with Sharon. Manipulative and mischievous, Vicki does as she pleases. Just weeks later, she discovers that she and Sharon have a half-brother, Dennis Rickman (Nigel Harman) – and persuades him to move to Walford. When she becomes pregnant by Spencer Moon (Christopher Parker), Sharon, who believes she is infertile, offers Vicki £10,000 to give her the baby to bring up as her own. Spencer wants to be a father but Vicki terminates the pregnancy.

Dennis soon tells Vicki that Den, who had supposedly died in 1989, is alive and living in Spain, and she brings him back to the Square to reunite with his family. She's horrified to discover that Sharon and Dennis have started a romantic relationship. Although they aren't biologically related, Vicki cannot accept it and rebels by dating Ash Ferreira (Raji James), which ends when he realizes that she is using him to get at her siblings. Eventually, Vicki and Den's objections take their toll on Sharon and Dennis and they end the relationship.

In 2004, an 18-year-old Vicki starts a relationship with her 46-year-old college lecturer, Tommy Grant (Robert Cavanah); her family, particularly stepmother Chrissie Watts (Tracy-Ann Oberman), are outraged. Tommy feigns love for Vicki and they talk about leaving Walford to go travelling. Knowing that Tommy is untrustworthy, Chrissie attempts to seduce him. After a brief kiss, Chrissie strips him naked in the toilets of The Queen Victoria public house, on the promise that she will soon join him. She steals his clothes and forces Vicki to see him for the lying cheat he is. Vicki is devastated and initially furious with Chrissie but eventually realizes she had her best interests at heart.

During a family meal on Christmas Day 2004, Sharon and Dennis announce that they have resumed their romantic relationship, only for Dennis's girlfriend Zoe Slater (Michelle Ryan) to announce that she is pregnant. Sharon decides to go to America alone and persuades Dennis to stay with Zoe and their baby. Den talks to Sharon alone, trying to persuade her to stay. Vicki overhears him say he does not love Vicki as much as he loves Sharon. Deciding she cannot live with such a father, Vicki decides to return to her mother in America. It is later revealed that she has moved to Australia and reunited with Spencer.

In January 2014, Sharon tells Spencer's brother, Alfie Moon (Shane Richie), that they need someone to help them open a bar in Sydney, so Alfie goes there for a few weeks to work with them. Vicki and Spencer are unable to attend Sharon's wedding to Phil Mitchell (Steve McFadden) in September 2014, nor are they able to attend the wedding of Vicki's relative Ian Beale (Adam Woodyatt) to his ex-wife Jane (Laurie Brett) in February 2015. When Lofty returns to Walford in 2019 for Legg's (Leonard Fenton) funeral, he gives Sharon a £20,000 cheque to give to Vicki. In 2022, Vicki is revealed to be back in the USA when Sharon flies over to be with her whilst Vicki undergoes emergency surgery.

=== 2025–present ===
In February 2025, her uncle, Martin (James Bye) dies during an explosion at the Vic when the roof collapses, crushing him under a steel beam. In the wake of this, Sharon contacts Michelle and Vicki to inform them that he has died. While Michelle is too distraught to return for his funeral, Vicki arrives back in Walford the following month alongside her new partner, Ross Marshall (Alex Walkinshaw) and his son Joel (Max Murray) already where they greet Sharon while she is in the middle of an argument with Phil after sleeping with his brother, Grant. Vicki tells Sharon that Spencer had an affair resulting in their break-up until Alfie calls Spencer and reveals that Vicki cheated on Spencer with Ross, who demands that she ask Sharon to borrow money to pay off an unknown debt. Vicki asks Ian for money and Sharon also agrees to help, but Michelle informs Sharon that Vicki is paying off Ross's debts. Sharon confronts Vicki and after an argument, refuses to help her, but changes her mind for Vicki's sake. It is later revealed that Ross is paying off a girl whom Joel touched inappropriately, but keeps this hidden from Vicki until Joel sleeps with Avani Nandra-Hart (Aaliyah James), which leads to the fury of her father Ravi Gulati (Aaron Thiara). Vicki learns from Sharon that her half-brother Zack Hudson (James Farrar) is the biological father of Barney Mitchell (Lewis Bridgeman). Vicki agrees to help Sharon dissuade Zack from revealing the truth, but Zack is presumed dead after drowning in a car accident with Teddy Mitchell (Roland Manookian). Upset, Vicki confronts Barney's mother Nicola Mitchell (Laura Doddington) and reveals the truth to Barney. However, it is revealed that Zack has survived the accident and Barney choses Teddy.

Vicki starts working as an assistant accountant to Bernadette Taylor (Clair Norris), who is managing Ravi's family's finances. Vicki grows suspicious of Bernadette, and when she learns that she is fleecing the Panesar family, Vicki blackmails her for money to repay Sharon. Vicki tells Kathy who then informs Ravi's stepmother Suki Panesar-Unwin (Balvinder Sopal). Bernadette frames Vicki to save herself, but when the Panesars discover the truth, she flees. Following Avani's abortion and learning that his mother Cleo is remarrying, Joel, under continuing toxic influence from misogynistic content online, is furious and he turns vile with both Avani and Vicki. He threatens to harm Vicki, and when she sees him harassing Stacey Slater (Lacey Turner), she threatens to report him to the police.

In September 2025, Vicki confronts Zoe following Zoe’s unexpected return to Albert Square after twenty years away. Tensions quickly rise as Vicki accuses Zoe of never taking responsibility for her part in Den’s murder. The confrontation turns physical inside the cafe, but the animosity continues to build. Days later, the pair clash again in a heated public argument on Bridge Street, which escalates into a full-blown brawl witnessed by several residents. During the chaos, Zack attempts to break up the fight but is accidentally struck by Vicki, leaving him injured. Joel pleads with Vicki for money to buy tickets for himself and Tommy Moon (Sonny Kendall) to attend an event in Birmingham hosted by Drake Zagan, a misogynistic podcaster he has been following online. When Vicki refuses, she later discovers her credit card has been stolen and realises Joel used it to buy the tickets. Vicki and Kathy travel to Birmingham to track them down, where they are met with hostility and subjected to misogynistic abuse from attendees at the event.

In October 2025, Joel’s behaviour becomes increasingly erratic after he is caught showing a sexually explicit video at school that targets Amy Mitchell (Ellie Dadd). The incident sparks outrage across the community, prompting Vicki to once again confront him over his misogynistic actions and growing hostility towards women. Their argument turns explosive when Joel refuses to take accountability, instead hurling abuse towards Vicki. As the confrontation escalates inside their home, Joel violently attacks Vicki, leaving her severely injured. He records a video of her lying motionless on the floor before repeatedly kicking her and leaving her for dead. Vicki manages to regain consciousness, collapses in the Vic and is rushed to hospital. Ross finds out about the incident shortly afterwards, and goes to the hospital to be with Vicki; he then goes home, and discovers that Joel was behind the attack after watching the video that he recorded on his phone linked to his laptop. Joel is later arrested after Ross calls the police. Vicki, disappointed to learn that Ross visited the police station, tells him to go from the hospital then Sharon later has Kathy and Zack bag up all Ross and Joel's belongings and Ross is thrown out after returning his key. Ross sees Vicki return home with Sharon and Zack later that day. Vicki stills cares about Ross and Kathy and Sharon arrange a Lake District trip for her but only Kathy is made aware that Kathy's partner Harvey Monroe (Ross Boatman) and Ian are going to house Ross. Vicki sleeps with Zack the night before Joel's trial but reconciles with Ross when he supports her. Joel pleads guilty and is sentenced to six months in a young offender's institute, and Ross arranges for him to live with his estranged mother, Cleo (Mazz Murray), when he is released. Ross later proposes to Vicki, but she admits that she slept with someone else, but doesn't tell him who it was. Ross forgives her and they get engaged. Her half-brother Mark Fowler Jnr (Stephen Aaron-Sipple) also makes his return to support her at the trial. Vicki tries, unsuccessfully, to get him out of his criminal affiliations.

Vicki and Zack sleep together again, despite Vicki insisting she loves Ross. Zack develops feelings for her and tries to sabotage the wedding by manipulating Ross into believing Vicki is still having the affair. On the wedding day, Ross finds out it was Zack who Vicki was sleeping with during the vows and nearly calls off the wedding, but he eventually forgives Vicki, and the two marry. When they return from their honeymoon, they are shocked to learn that Joel has returned with Cleo, having been released.

== Reception ==
For her role as Vicki, Haig was longlisted for "Best Newcomer" at the 2025 Inside Soap Awards.

According to author Hilary Kingsley, the scenes in EastEnders' early years that showed toddler Vicki "chattering happily" with the baby actor who played her uncle Martin (Jon Peyton Price) were viewer favourites. EastEnders was criticised in 1993 for featuring a storyline about child abduction at an inappropriate time. In the storyline, six-year old Vicki was abducted, leaving Michelle frantic with worry. In what has been described as a "coincidence of ill-timing", the storyline was screened at the same time as the real-life abduction and murder of two-year-old James Bulger. The BBC was forced to transmit a health warning prior to the airing of the episodes, announcing that the storyline would be "resolved positively".

In the book, Social Issues in Television, a senior, nameless script editor opined that the abduction storyline sought to engage the audience at the expense of any parent's realistic concerns: "We get it wrong when we take the easy route like the kidnap snatch with Vicki. My argument about this was that I am a father but have never had my kids snatched. If I'm just sitting at home and my children are out late at night and they say they're going to be back at midnight and they don't come back, you immediately think they're dead and you start to worry. If they'd actually been snatched, it would have affected my entire life forever. I would never have recovered from it. I would have been frightened every time one of them left my side. Therefore the consequence of running a storyline like that is immense. If we were being totally responsible about it the fallout on Michelle would have been, well I just don't think she would have been the same person again."

The character received media criticism due to her American accent upon her reintroduction in 2003. Johnson said, "I knew that would happen because I'm the only character who speaks differently. I haven't taken any of that to heart." However, when the accent was altered from American to British, this received criticism too with Ian Hyland from the Daily Mirror describing it as "hilarious" and branding the character "Go Away Again Vicki". He added, "Presumably the producers decided the reason viewers found her so annoying was her whiny American voice. Try again, guys." Upon her departure in 2004, Johnson was also critical about her character's alternating accent: "When I took the job they weren't sure what accent they wanted Vicki to have and about a week before they told me it should be American. I did that for a few months and then one day out of the blue I arrived on set and they told me they wanted me to change to Cockney. It was the producer's decision. I was as stunned as everyone else – all the criticism was perfectly justified. It's probably the most stupid decision they could have made. People assumed I was slipping out of the accent – but it was nothing to do with me. I've taken a lot of stick. But it doesn't bother me because I know the truth."

A proportion of viewers responded negatively when Vicki was shown to have an abortion. Johnson claims she received abusive letters from fans of the show and that she was stopped in the street twice by older women who told her "it was quite wrong [...] to have got rid of the baby. I found that awkward at the time. But, gradually, I came to realise it was rather flattering. Those women believed in my character so completely they forgot she wasn't real. So now I think I must have been doing a good job." Johnson has since been critical of the storylines given to her character and described them as weak.
