= Spencer Moon =

Fictional character from the BBC soap opera EastEnders

- EastEnders character
- Portrayed by: Christopher Parker
- Duration: 2002–2005
- First appearance: Episode 2420; 29 November 2002
- Last appearance: Episode 2868; 7 January 2005
- Created by: Louise Berridge
In-universe information
- Occupation: Barman; Chip shop worker
- Father: Alfred Moon
- Mother: Cherry Moon
- Brothers: Alfie Moon
- Grandmothers: Nana Moon
- Nephews: Tommy Moon (adoptive); Bert Moon; Ernie Moon
- Nieces: Cherry Slater
- Other relatives: Jake Moon; Danny Moon; Maxwell Moon

Spencer Moon is a fictional character from the BBC soap opera EastEnders, played by Christopher Parker between 2002 and 2005. Spencer is the brother of Alfie Moon (Shane Richie).

== Creation and development ==
Parker was cast in the role of Spencer in 2002, of which he expressed surprise, saying "I can't believe I've achieved my biggest ambition so fast." In November 2004, Parker was rushed to hospital, and during his recovery, EastEnders bosses excused him of all filming commitments. After three weeks of extended leave, Parker and the production staff reached a mutual decision that he would not return to the series, writers created a storyline to explain the character's absence, rewriting existing scripts to do so.

In April 2010, it was reported that EastEnders producers were considering bringing Spencer back to the series, and would make their decision after Alfie returns to the show later in the year. However, a BBC spokesperson denied the report, saying "There are absolutely no plans to bring Chris Parker – or the character of Spencer Moon – back to EastEnders."

== Storylines ==
Spencer arrives in November 2002 with his older brother Alfie (Shane Richie). Alfie takes over management of The Queen Victoria public house and he and Spencer move into the upstairs flat along with their grandmother Nana Moon (Hilda Braid). Both Spencer's parents were killed when he was young, and since then, he was brought up by his brother and grandmother.

On New Year's Eve 2002, after much chasing, Spencer receives a kiss from Kelly Taylor (Brooke Kinsella). He believes it will lead to a relationship so tries to woo her, plying her with gifts and following her wherever she goes. Kelly does not take him seriously and he ends up looking foolish. His inexperience with women is obvious and as his 18th birthday approaches he admits to Alfie that he is a virgin and believes he is likely to remain that way. Alfie gives him advice to go for less attractive girls. On his birthday, Spencer gets a kiss but the girl finds out he was only interested because he deemed her an easy target and leaves. Kelly witnesses his plight and, to cheer him up, takes him home and the two have sex. However, Alfie ruins things by offering Kelly money to take Spencer out the following day. Kelly, an ex-prostitute, immediately thinks that Spencer is trying to buy her body, and refuses to see him again. Spencer begins to think the only way to be taken seriously by women is to impress them with money, so he started selling stolen goods provided by Mickey Miller (Joe Swash). Spencer is given forged money in return for his goods and gets in trouble when he spends the money in a club owned by local gangster and boss of The Firm, Jack Dalton (Hywel Bennett), and Spencer discovers the last person to spend forged notes in Jack's club was killed. Alfie is forced to use his own savings to save Spencer, but Jack cannot let the matter go due to his reputation. Alfie takes the blame and gets a severe beating.

Spencer tries to settle down and works for his brother as a barman to keep out of trouble. Further problems arise when a one-night stand with Vicki Fowler (Scarlett Alice Johnson) leaves her pregnant. Spencer soon warms to the idea of being a father but a horrified Vicki has an abortion behind his back. Spencer finds it difficult to forgive her, but eventually does on New Year's Eve 2003, when they are both stranded on the Scottish moors following a motor accident. Vicki tries to set Spencer up with Kelly, locking them in the office at nightclub Angie's Den. After initially arguing, and a revelation from Kelly that she only slept with him out of pity, they begin talking. When Vicki lets them out, she finds them kissing. During the summer, Kelly, Spencer, and Kareena Ferreira (Pooja Shah) decide to become holiday reps in Ibiza. Kelly and Kareena pass their interview but Spencer is forced to stay behind while Kelly goes away. On the day of her departure, Kelly tells Spencer she loves him, which he reciprocates, and she promises to return to him. However, Kareena returns on her own, and tells Spencer that Kelly met someone else and was not returning. In June 2004, Spencer gets trapped in the remains of a helter skelter that collapses after one of the bolts loosen but is later rescued.

Spencer starts working as a cleaner for Ian Beale, but boasts about his high-power status to Stacey Slater (Lacey Turner). Spencer was thrilled when she shows an interest in him, and they end up in bed together after a single date. Perceiving him to be wealthy, Stacey blackmails Spencer claiming she is only 15. Fearing he would end up in prison, Spencer pays her money and illegally serves her alcohol in the bar. He is relieved when he finally discovers her true age and that he has not committed a crime. Spencer's cousins Danny (Jake Maskall) and Jake (Joel Beckett) arrive in Walford, and Danny stashes drugs in Pauline Fowler's (Wendy Richard) home. He convinces Spencer to retrieve the stash, but Spencer is seen breaking in by Dot Branning (June Brown), who promptly phones the police. Spencer is caught in the act, while Danny leaves him to take the blame. Spencer is arrested and spends New Year's Eve in prison. In his final appearance, Spencer infuriates Alfie by telling Jake and Danny about his history with Andy Hunter (Michael Higgs). Off-screen, Alfie sends him to live with another cousin Maxwell (Andrew Paul) in Australia to keep him out of trouble. Since living in Australia, Spencer has reunited with his ex-girlfriend Vicki. In January 2014, Sharon Rickman (Letitia Dean) tells Alfie that Spencer and Vicki are looking for somebody to help them open a bar in Sydney.

In March 2025, when Vicki (now Alice Haig) returns to Walford to attend Martin's (now James Bye) funeral with her new boyfriend Ross Marshall (Alex Walkinshaw) and his son Joel (Max Murray), she explains to Sharon that Spencer had cheated on her, which caused them to break up. However, when Kat calls Spencer to clarify the situation and hands the phone to Alfie, Spencer reveals that Vicki was actually the one who cheated on him with Ross, who was his best friend. When Vicki apologises to Sharon for lying, she explains that she had become tired of Spencer's immaturity, which motivated her to cheat with Ross.
