= Renewal of vows =

Renewal of vows may refer to:

- A wedding vow renewal ceremony
- Renewal of vows made by a member of a religious order at their religious profession
