= Janet Amsden =

British actress

Janet Amsden is a British former actress who appeared in EastEnders as Margaret Wilson and was in Family Affairs, playing Marie Taylor.

She trained under Yat Malmgren at Drama Centre, and is one of the few practitioners currently working to share his methods. She is also an acting tutor and director, Ray Fearon being one of her students. She teaches and directs at ALRA. Since 2013 she has taught this method, Movement Psychology, at the Giles Foreman Centre for Acting in London, and also for GFCA in Paris and in New York.

== Filmography ==
- Doctors - Beatrice Taylor (2019), Angie Dunham (2023)
- EastEnders - Margaret Wilson (2005–2006)
- Family Affairs - Marie Taylor (2004)
- Daylight Robbery - Clinic doctor (1999)
- The King of Chaos - Chief Inspector (1998)
- Getting It Right - Mrs. Blake (Hussy 1989)
- Hussy - Hostess (1989)
- The Thirteenth Tale - the Missus (2013)
