= Julian Harries =

British actor and playwright

Julian Harries is a British actor and playwright.

For the BBC, he played Flight Lieutenant John Maze in Bomber Harris, Callum McCulloch in EastEnders, and appeared in the BBC series Undercover Heart. Other roles include TV Host in the film Before You Go, (directed by Lewis Gilbert), Duff Cooper in Spies of Warsaw, with David Tennant, and "Quiz Master" in Detectorists (Series 1).

He has guest-starred in two Doctor Who audio plays - Bloodtide and The Time of the Daleks.

Stage work includes the 2007 international tour of the Royal Shakespeare Company production of King Lear starring Ian McKellen in the title role and Sylvester McCoy as the Fool.

Played Brocklehurst/Pilot/St John Rivers in Shared Experience Theatre Company's West End production of Jane Eyre.

In 2009, Harries played Guy Jones in Alan Ayckbourn's comedy A Chorus of Disapproval at the New Wolsey Theatre, Ipswich, and the Colchester Mercury Theatre, alongside Harry Secombe's daughter, Katy.

In the 2016-17 UK & international tour of the stage adaptation of Dirty Dancing, he played Dr Jake Houseman.

With Pat Whymark, he founded the Suffolk-based Common Ground Theatre Company in 2007.
