= Pamela Cundell =

British actress (1920–2015)

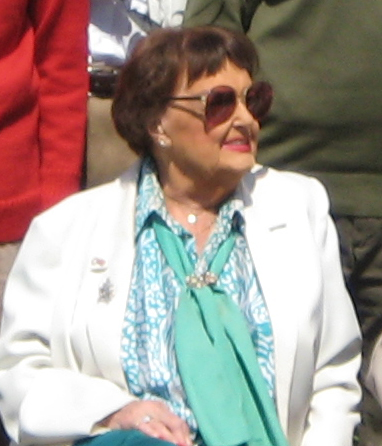
- Pamela Cundell in May 2011
- Born: Pamela Isabel Cundell; 15 January 1920; Croydon, England
- Died: 14 February 2015 (aged 95); London, England
- Resting place: St Paul's Churchyard, London, England
- Education: Guildhall School of Music and Drama
- Occupation: Actress
- Spouses: Robert O'Connor (m. 1948, divorced) Leslie Newport-Gwilt (m. 1955, divorced) Bill Fraser (m. 1981; died 1987)
- Children: 1

Pamela Isabel Cundell (15 January 1920 – 14 February 2015) was an English character actress. She played Mrs Fox in the long-running TV comedy Dad's Army.

She was a descendant of Henry Condell, one of the managers of the Lord Chamberlain's Men, the playing company of William Shakespeare. Henry Condell also helped put together the first folio of Shakespeare's works after his death.

== Early life ==
Pamela Cundell was born in Croydon, Surrey, in 1920 into a show business family, and trained at the Guildhall School of Music and Drama, before gaining experience in rep and summer shows as a stand up comic.

== Career ==
Making her first television appearance in 1957 with Peter Sellers and Michael Bentine, she worked with many of the comic performers of her time, including Frankie Howerd, Benny Hill and Bill Fraser, the last of whom she was married to. A semi-regular in Dad's Army as Mrs Fox, her character married Lance-Corporal Jones (Clive Dunn) in the final episode.

Cundell appeared in many television shows, including Bless This House, as Peggy, The Bill, On the Buses, Potter, Are You Being Served? Casualty, Z-Cars, and Big Deal, The Borrowers, London’s Burning and, in 2005–06, as Nora Swann in EastEnders. She worked in the theatre, including pantomime, and appeared in several feature films.

On 3 August 2008 Pamela Cundell was interviewed, alongside Ian Lavender, Bill Pertwee and Frank Williams, about her time on Dad's Army for the 40th anniversary tribute programme Jonathan Ross Salutes Dad's Army, presented by Ross. She explained that her character Mrs Fox was so called because of the fox fur which she always wore draped over her shoulders.

Pamela Cundell was involved with amateur theatre in her later years and was President of the Harlequins Theatre Club of Mill Hill, where she directed several shows, along with fellow Dad's Army actor Frank Williams.

== Personal life and death ==
In 1981, she married the Scottish (Perth)-born actor William Simpson Fraser, aka Bill Fraser He died from emphysema in Bushey, Hertfordshire, aged 79, on 9 September 1987.

Cundell died at the age of 95 on 14 February 2015.
