= Michael Keating (actor) =

English actor (1947–2026)

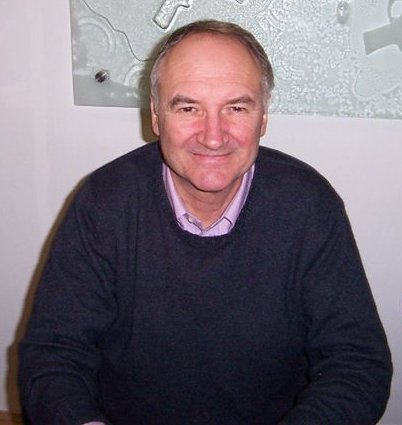
- Keating in 2005
- Born: Michael Frank Keating; 10 February 1947; Edmonton, Middlesex, England
- Died: 26 April 2026 (aged 79)
- Occupation: Actor
- Years active: 1966–2022
- Known for: Vila Restal in Blake's 7 Reverend Stevens in EastEnders

Michael Frank Keating (10 February 1947 – 26 April 2026) was an English actor. He was best known for his role as Vila Restal in the science fiction television series Blake's 7 (1978–1981), and as Reverend Stevens in EastEnders (2005–2017).

== Life and career ==
Keating was born in Edmonton, Middlesex, on 10 February 1947. His acting career began in 1966. One of his earlier notable roles was as Goudry in The Sun Makers, a 1977 Doctor Who story. Just over a month later, Keating first appeared in the role of Vila Restal in the BBC TV series Blake's 7, which aired from 1978 to 1981. Vila was the only character to appear in all fifty-two episodes of the series. In 1981, Keating appeared in an episode of the BBC sitcom Yes Minister titled The Death List, playing the role of Police Constable Ross.

Some years later, Keating reunited with his Blake's 7 co-star Gareth Thomas in an episode of the BBC drama series Casualty. In 2004, Keating returned to the Doctor Who franchise, guest-starring as Major Koth in the Big Finish Productions audio adventure The Twilight Kingdom. In 2006, he starred in another Doctor Who audio adventure, this time as Inspector Chardalot in Year of the Pig. In 2009, he had a brief role in the BBC one-off drama Micro Men about the rise of the British home computer market in the late 1970s and early 1980s.

From 2005 to 2017, Keating played Reverend Stevens in the BBC soap opera EastEnders. He appeared as a recurring character, usually for a single episode or a few episodes at a time, in connection with another character's christening, marriage, or funeral, or relating to regular churchgoer Dot Branning (June Brown).

Keating died at home from dementia on 26 April 2026, aged 79.

== Filmography ==
=== Film ===
Year	Title	Role	Notes
1970	Julius Caesar	Plebeian #2	
2009	Micro Men	Derek Holley	TV movie

=== Television ===
Year	Title	Role	Notes
1969	Special Branch	Det. Constable Pearce	
1971	Merry-Go-Round	Saxon Prisoner	Episode: "The Raven and the Cross 1", TV Documentary
1972	Doomwatch	Stephen Grigg	Episode: "Enquiry"
1972	Omnibus	Dante	Episode: "Max Beerbohm Remembers", TV documentary
1973	The Dragon's Opponent	First mate	Episode: "The Drawn Sword", historical miniseries
1977	Doctor Who	Goudry	Serial: The Sun Makers
1978–1981	Blake's 7	Vila Restal	52 episodes
1980	The Dawson Watch	TBA	2 episodes: "The Future" & "Holidays", sci-fi comedy
1981	Yes Minister	Constable Ross	Episode: "The Death List"
1983	Paul Squire, Esq	TBA	Episode: "1.6", sketch and variety show
1986	Rainbow	Detective Inspector Frost	Episode: "Detectives"
1988	King & Castle	Inspector Bell	Episode: "Floppy Discs", crime drama
1989	The Play on One	Daniel / Charlie	2 episodes: "Clowns" & "These Foolish Things"
1989	Capital City	Estate agent	Episode: "Thanksgiving"
1990	The Two of Us	Police sergeant	Episode: "Dangers in the Night"
1990	London's Burning	A. C. O. Howard	Episode "3.7", role uncredited
1991	Kinsey	Murray	Episode: "The Authentic Voice... Little Miss Goosestep"
1993	Between the Lines	Police Federation Rep.	Episode: "Some Must Watch"
1994	True Crimes	Reenactment	Episode: "The Deepest Secret", TV documentary
1994	The Bill	Geoff Tilson	Episode: "Menace"
1995, 2000	Casualty	Graham Wingate / Pat Sadler	2 episodes: "Bringing It All Back Home" & "States of Shock"
2005–2013, 2015–2017	EastEnders	Reverend George Stevens	54 episodes
2009	Midsomer Murders	Derek Painter	Episode: "The Dogleg Murders"

=== Radio and CD audio dramas ===
Year	Title	Role	Notes
1998–1999	Blake's 7	Vila Restal	2 stories: "The Sevenfold Crown" & "The Syndeton Experiment"
1999–2000	Soldiers of Love	Mydas Mydasson	5 episodes, sci-fi comedy
2004, 2006	Doctor Who: The Monthly Adventures	Major Koth / Inspector Chardalot	2 serials: The Twilight Kingdom & Year of the Pig
2010	Graceless	Earl Kreekpolt	Series 1
2010	Blake's 7: A Rebellion Reborn	Vila Restal	Episode: "When Vila Met Gan"
2012–2016	Blake's 7: The Liberator Chronicles	Vila Restal/Narrator	14 episodes
2013–2020	Blake's 7: The Classic Adventures	Vila Restal	34 episodes
2014	Doctor Who: The Fourth Doctor Adventures	Calvert	Serial: The Evil One
2021–2022	The Worlds of Blake's 7	Vila Restal	3 episodes
