= Michael Darlow =

British television producer, director and writer

- Born: 13 June 1934 (age 92); Wolverhampton, England
- Occupations: Television producer, director and writer

Michael Darlow (born 13 June 1934) is a British television producer, director and writer. After starting as an actor, his first short film was seen by documentary film maker John Grierson and shown on TV and at the 1960 Edinburgh Film Festival. Darlow's documentary, drama and arts programmes have won international awards including BAFTAs, an Emmy, and Gold at the New York Television Festival. His works include The World At War episode Genocide, The Barretts of Wimpole Street, Johnny Cash at San Quentin and Bomber Harris. He is a Fellow of the Royal Television Society.

== Early life and education ==
Darlow was born in Wolverhampton, where his father was the deputy town clerk and his mother was a socialist and feminist organizer. When Darlow was a child, his father became town clerk of West Bromwich. During the Second World War, Darlow, his younger brother and their mother were evacuated to Little Marlow in Buckinghamshire.

He has said that it was while attending a pantomime in Little Marlow that he began to be “smitten” by the theatre. Later, as a student at a preparatory school in Bishop’s Stortford, he belonged to the school’s Dramatic Society and was involved in student productions.

Through his mother he met Esme Church, who ran an acting and liberal arts school in Bradford, largely for working-class students from northern England. Although he passed an audition for the Royal Academy of Dramatic Arts, he decided to attend Church’s school instead, which had a “socialist feeling” that he appreciated. While there, he developed anger over social inequality in the UK.

== Military service ==
Following his graduation from Church’s school, Darlow completed his National Service as a radar officer in the Royal Air Force. During his service, he learned about electronics, which later proved useful in his television career.

== Show-business career ==
After completing his military service, Darlow began work as a theatre actor. He appeared on television for the first time on New Year’s Day 1959, in a drama on BBC1. His first line of dialogue on TV was improvised because the actress in the scene went up on her line. He went on to act in several television programmes during the late 1950s and early 1960s. In 1959, he began acting in the West End production of the play The World of Suzie Wong, ultimately appearing in more than 800 performances.

As a side activity, Darlow helped found a small company of actors who put on new plays on Sunday nights. The group was partly subsidized by the author C. P. Snow. It was there that he began to work as a professional theatre director. He wrote and directed a documentary film entitled All These People (1960) about the history of the city of Reading and then another, The Holloway Road, about that thoroughfare in London. Both were shown at Edinburgh Film Festival. During the early 1960s, he acted for about a year in the West End production of Bonne Suppe, a play starring Coral Browne.

His first work as a TV director was for the BBC in Bristol, where he answered to John Boorman. He worked as a researcher on a documentary history of the trade-union movement.

He went on to work at Granada TV, where he was the associate producer of Ten Days that Shook the World, a 1967 documentary marking the fiftieth anniversary of the Russian Revolution. It was the first television collaboration between Britain and the Soviet Union. After several extended visits to the Soviet Union, he decided to make a television documentary about the Siege of Leningrad during the Second World War. The project developed into a three-part 1968 series about three cities under siege. In addition to Leningrad, it covered the London Blitz and the destruction of Berlin at the end of World War II. Darlow served as director and producer on all three parts.

He went on to direct Johnny Cash at San Quentin, a 1969 documentary. He later recalled that a Johnny Cash concert in San Diego “felt like a neo-Nazi racist rally.” After filming the Cash documentary, he parted ways with Granada Films owing to creative differences, although he would later work again with the company on individual projects. In the 1960s he also directed episodes of the TV series Coronation Street.

During the early 1970s he directed The Hero of My Life, a TV movie about Charles Dickens, as well as TV documentaries about filmmakers Denis Mitchell and François Truffaut and the painter J. M. W. Turner. Darlow also directed a stage production of Look Back in Anger at the Derby Playhouse.

He directed The Sun is God, a 1974 Thames Television production. He directed two episodes of the comprehensive 26-part documentary series The World at War (1974), narrated by Laurence Olivier and produced by Thames Television. Darlow’s episodes covered the occupation of the Netherlands and the Holocaust. For the latter episode he interviewed former Nazis as well as Holocaust victims. He shot over six hours of film, and since there was too much to include in a single episode of The World at War, much of the extra footage was used for two other projects. One of them was Secretary to Hitler (1974), a 23-minute documentary short in which Darlow interviewed Hitler’s private secretary Traudl Junge. The other project was aired in 1975 as the miniseries The Final Solution.

He went on to make the TV movie Hazlitt in Love (1977). In 1979, he directed the TV miniseries Crime and Punishment, starring John Hurt, and the TV movie Suez 1956, about British Prime Minister Anthony Eden and the Suez crisis of 1956. Between 1979 and 1990 he directed a number of TV plays for the BBC, ITV, and Granada, including Little Eyolf, The Master Builder, and The Winslow Boy, while also continuing to direct TV documentaries and music programmes. He also directed the six-part TV miniseries Merlin of the Crystal Cave (1991), the TV movies Bomber Harris (1989) and A Bright New Hope for Mankind (1993), and programmes for the TV documentary series The Works and Forty Minutes.

== Books ==
In connection with a television programme he directed about Oman, Darlow and Richard Fawkes co-wrote The Last Corner of Arabia, a non-fiction book about the country. After compiling the BBC's video obituary for playwright Terence Rattigan, Darlow wrote a biography of Rattigan.

== Other professional activities ==
During much of his career he was active in efforts to reform the British Film Institute and the BBC. When the possibility of a fourth TV channel was raised, in addition to the two BBC channels and the one ITV channel, he was involved in the successful attempt to prevent ITV from taking control of it. This campaign led to the formation of Channel 4.

== Personal life ==
He considers himself a member of the “progressive left.”

== Honors and awards ==
Darlow was nominated for BAFTA Awards for Best Single Play (Suez 1956, 1979), for Best Factual Programme (The Final Solution, 1979; The World at War, 1973), and for Best Single Drama (Bomber Harris, 1989).
