= Bomber Harris (film) =

- Written by: Don Shaw
- Directed by: Michael Darlow
- Starring: John Thaw; Robert Hardy; Frederick Treves; Bernard Kay
- Country of origin: United Kingdom
- Original language: English

Production
- Producer: Innes Lloyd
- Running time: 85 mins

Original release
- Network: BBC One
- Release: 3 September 1989

Bomber Harris is a 1989 BBC television drama biography based on the life of Arthur Harris, who was Commander-in-chief of RAF Bomber Command during the Second World War.

John Thaw played the role of Harris during a period away from filming for the ITV crime drama Inspector Morse and Robert Hardy returned to the role of Winston Churchill, which had earned him a BAFTA nomination for Winston Churchill: The Wilderness Years. The drama was written by Don Shaw, produced by Innes Lloyd and directed by Michael Darlow.

== Cast ==
- John Thaw – Arthur Travers Harris
- Robert Hardy – Winston Churchill
- Frederick Treves – Sir Charles Portal
- Bernard Kay – A.M. Sir Robert Saundby
- Sophie Thompson – Jillie Harris
- Richard Heffer – Group Captain Davidson
- Phil Brown – Lord Beaverbrook
- Ronald Fletcher – BBC Newsreader
- David Healy – Lt. Gen. Ira Eaker USAAF
- William Kerwin – Fred Walsh
- Roger Llewellyn – Rev. John Collins
- John Nettleton – Wing Commander Harry Weldon
- David Quilter – Principal Medical Officer
- Roy Spencer – Magnus Spence
- Julian Harries - Flight Lieutenant John Maze
- Bob Sherman - General Carl Spaatz USAAF
- Ronald Lacey – RAF Officer (uncredited)
