= Alice Haig =

English actress (born 1985)

- Born: February 1985 (age 41); London, England
- Education: Webber Douglas Academy of Dramatic Art; Royal Central School of Speech and Drama
- Occupation: Actress
- Years active: 2007–present
- Television: Rain Dogs; EastEnders

Alice Haig (born February 1985) is an English actress, from London. After graduating from the Royal Central School of Speech and Drama, she went on to appear in various television and stage roles and a number of short films. Her television credits include This Is Going to Hurt, Rain Dogs and The Day of the Jackal, whilst her stage roles have included Richard III, Pride and Prejudice and Love from a Stranger. In 2025, she took over the role of Vicki Fowler in the BBC soap opera EastEnders. Her father is the actor David Haig.

== Early life and education ==
Haig was born in February 1985 in London. She studied at the Webber Douglas Academy of Dramatic Art and the Royal Central School of Speech and Drama respectively, graduating from the latter in 2007.

== Career ==
Haigh made her screen debut in the BBC television film Scottish Killers as Dinah McNicol, a victim of the serial killer Peter Tobin. She went on to appear in the films Dark Crossing (2010) and Chillerama (2011), as well as various short films including Salesman (2012), Short Version of Alma (2016) and How to Disappear Completely (2019). She began her stage career at Shakespeare's Globe and has appeared in array of productions including Wasted (2013), Sense and Sensibility (2014), 'Tis Pity She's a Whore (2014), 84 Charing Cross Road (2015), Baby (2015), The Brink (2016), Richard III (2016), Pride and Prejudice (2017), Love from a Stranger (2018) and Unmythable (2019). Haig also went on to voice several characters in the audio series Doctor Who: The Companion Chronicles between 2014 and 2015.

In 2022, she appeared as a nurse in an episode of This Is Going to Hurt. The following year, she portrayed Sophie in the BBC series Rain Dogs. In 2024, she appeared in the spy thriller series The Day of the Jackal. In February 2025, it was announced that Haig would be taking over the role of Vicki Fowler in the BBC soap opera EastEnders. The character last appeared 21 years prior, then played by Scarlett Alice Johnson. Upon joining the show, Haig said she was "so excited" and that she had "always watched EastEnders", adding that it was "so cool to be playing a character like Vicki" and that she could not "wait for all the Albert Square drama ahead."

== Filmography ==
=== Television ===
Year	Title	Role	Notes
2010	Scottish Killers	Dinah McNicol	Television film
2014	Beautality	Cheryl	Television film
2015	Deadly Sins	Amanda Hayes	Episode: "Don't Make Me Kill You"
2015	Above the Line	Charlie Hughes	Television film
2017	Jaded	Dana	Television film
2018	The Kominsky Method	Woman #2	Episode: "Chapter 4: A Kegel Squeaks"
2019	Jett	Model #2	Episode: "Frank Sweeney"
2022	This Is Going to Hurt	Outpatients Nurse	Guest role
2022	Andor	Wife	Episode: "The Eye"
2023	Rain Dogs	Sophie	Episode: "Scenes from a Crucifixion"
2024	The Day of the Jackal	TV Director	Guest role
2025–present	EastEnders	Vicki Fowler	Regular role

=== Audio ===
Year	Title	Role	Notes
2014–2015	Doctor Who: The Companion Chronicles	Sida	Recurring role
2015	The Avengers	Stella Creighton	
2016–2017	Blood and Milk	Annie Riley	Main role

== Stage ==
Year	Title	Role	Venue
2007	Holding Fire!	Various	Globe Theatre
2008	What Cheryl Did Next	Cheryl	Theatre503
2008	The Children's Hour	Evelyn Munn	Royal Exchange, Manchester
2008	Greek Tragedy	Mrytle	Theatre503
2009	When Cheryl Was Brassic	Cheryl	Nabakov Theatre
2009	Curse of the Starving Class	Emma Tate	Royal Lyceum Theatre
2010	Hay Fever	Sorrel Bliss	Leeds Playhouse
2010	As You Like It	Celia	Leeds Playhouse
2010, 2012	The Fairy-Queen	Hermia	Glyndebourne Festival Opera
2011	Table for 6	Kate	TenFour Theatre
2011	Even Stillness	Her	Theatre503
2012	Hard Shoulders	Jade Christie	The Pleasance
2013	Wasted	Charlotte	Paines Plough tour
2013	I Didn't Always Live Here	Ellen	Finborough Theatre
2013	Descent	Chloey	Southwark Playhouse
2014	Sense and Sensibility	Margaret Dashwood / Lucy Steele	The Watermill Center
2014	'Tis a Pity She Was a Whore	Philotis	Globe Theatre
2015	Baby	Persephone	Hope Theatre
2015	84, Charing Cross Road	Cecily Farr	Salisbury Playhouse
2016	The Brink	Jo	Orange Tree Theatre
2016	Richard III	Lady Anne	U.S. tour
2017	Pride and Prejudice	Kitty Bennett / Charlotte Lucas	Nottingham Playhouse / York Theatre Royal
2018	Love from a Stranger	Mavis Wilson	Royal & Derngate
2019	Unmythable	Gamma	Out of Chaos
