= Dickon Tolson =

British actor (born 1973)

- Born: 24 March 1973 (age 53); UK
- Occupation: Actor

Dickon Tolson is a British actor who started training at the Anna Scher Theatre school when he was 8 years old. Between 1996 and 1998, he appeared as Lee Simms in 12 episodes of Peak Practice.

In 1998, he appeared as 'Dirty Dave' in Like It Is (film). In 2005 he appeared in EastEnders playing a young William Moon who was killed during the war. This special flashback episode was to mark Armistice Day and also featured a guest appearance from The Vicar of Dibley star Trevor Peacock.

Other shows Tolson has appeared include veteran hospital drama Casualty, The Bill, Wire in the Blood The one off drama 'Hot Money' On ITV1 in 2001, Silent Witness. In 2005, he guest starred in the Doctor Who audio drama The Game.

He also works for a theatre company called Big Foot. Previously, he taught drama at Aylwin Girls School in Bermondsey, south east London. Tolson holds a degree in philosophy, graduating from Middlesex University in 1997.
