= Nina Fry =

English actress

Nina Fry is an English actress who played Robyn Stone in Grange Hill from 1991 to 1996.

She has also appeared in Casualty and Spooks, where she was Nurse Jenny in episode 7, as well as playing Roxanne Duley in a 1997 TV show called So-Called Friends.

More recently she played a dance hall girl in Vera Drake. She has also played the recurring role of Amy in EastEnders in late 2005 and early 2006.

In 2012, Fry appeared in low budget British movie The String with Cy Chadwick. Fry's character is lapdancer and cocaine addict Toni.
