= Charlotte Avery =

British actress

Charlotte Avery is a British actress, voice over artist and presenter. She is best known for her depiction of Tina Stewart in EastEnders, Sacha in Rides, and Natalie in Thin Ice.

== Filmography ==
- Scoop - 'Journalist' (2024)
- Rogue Agent - Madeleine Archer (2022)
- Casualty - (2007 - 2021)
- Shakespeare & Hathaway: Private Investigators - Tania Philkes, (2022)
- Doctors - (2004 - 2018)
- Toast of London – Betty Pimples
- Bloodforge - Cailleach • Aerten (2012)
- Love Soup – Davina, (2008)
- EastEnders – Marie (1996), Tina Stewart (2005)
- The Good Guys - Penny
- Waking the Dead – Christine Murphy (2004)
- Doctors – Bridget Walsh (2004)
- Murder in Mind – Nadine Hadley (2003)
- Warrior Angels – Eve (2002)
- Landmarks Portrait of Europe - Presenter
- Dark Blue Perfume – Young Katherine (1997)
- The New Adventures of Robin Hood – Gwynedd (1997)
- The Bill – Helen Sims, Tania Roth (1997 - 2008)
- Thin Ice – Natalie (1995)
- The Ruth Rendell Mysteries
- Lady Chatterley – Julia Hammond (1993)
- Rides – Sacha (1992)
- Jeeves and Wooster – Mabel (1991)
- The Famous Five – Marybelle Lenoir (1978)

=== Theatre ===
- Grease - 'Marty' - Dominion Theatre
- Woodhouse on Broadway - BBC TV
- Young Apollo - Thorndike Theatre
- Annie Get Your Gun - Chichester Festival Theatre
- Golden Years - 'Beatrice' - Birmingham Rep
- Stepping Out - 'Lynne' - Leicester Haymarket
- Whose A Lucky Boy - 'Jolly Sister' - Manchester Royal Exchange
- Starlight Express - Buffy the Buffet Car - Apollo Victoria Theatre + Tour
