= Hilda Braid =

British actress (1929–2007)

- Braid as Nana Moon in EastEnders
- Born: Hilda Braid; 3 March 1929; Northfleet, Kent, England
- Died: 6 November 2007 (aged 78); Brighton, Sussex, England
- Resting place: Woodvale Crematorium, Brighton
- Occupation: Actress
- Years active: 1948–2005
- Known for: EastEnders (2002–2005)
- Spouse: Brian Badcoe (died 1992)
- Children: 2

Hilda Braid (3 March 1929 – 6 November 2007) was an English actress who had a long career on British television. She became well known in her later years for playing Victoria "Nana" Moon on the BBC One soap opera EastEnders.

== Early life ==
Braid was born in Northfleet, Kent. She trained as an actress and dancer at the Royal Academy of Dramatic Art, having won a scholarship to train there. At RADA, she won the Lord Lurgan Award.

== Career ==
After graduating from RADA, Braid did rep and was cast in West End theatre productions, including parts in The Waltz of the Toreadors from 1956 to 1957, and Pickwick from 1963 to 1964. Later, she was a member of the Royal Shakespeare Company, performing in productions of Richard II in 1974, and King John in 1974 to 1975. Braid made her television debut in the police drama No Hiding Place, playing Alice Flinders in an episode that aired on 14 October 1960. In 1963, she appeared in Suspense. In the 1960s and 1970s, she also appeared in Crossroads, Softly, Softly, Catweazle, Z-Cars, Play for Today, The Onedin Line, The Crezz, Emmerdale, and Man About the House.

Braid's first major role came in middle-age and was that of Florence Johnson in the late 1970s British sitcom Citizen Smith. Around this time, she also appeared in In Loving Memory, Robin's Nest, and On Giant's Shoulders. She later had recurring roles in other sitcoms, including L for Lester (1982), The Bright Side (1985), The 10%ers (1994–1996), and Gogglewatch (1997–1998). TV appearances during the 1980s and 1990s included Oliver Twist, Brookside, One Foot in the Grave, Goodnight Sweetheart, Dangerfield, The Bill, Midsomer Murders, ChuckleVision, My Family, and Casualty. She also briefly appeared alongside Al Murray in the sitcom Time Gentlemen Please in the early 2000s. Her film roles were few, but she appeared in the film version of For the Love of Ada (1972), the cult horror film Killer's Moon (1978), The Wildcats of St Trinian's (1980), and 101 Dalmatians (1996).

In 2002, by then in her early 70s, Braid took up the role by which she would be best known, that of Nana Moon in EastEnders. Nana's grandson Alfie was played by Shane Richie, and following Ritchie's announcement that he was to leave the soap, her character was also written out, with the programme's makers saying it would be "unrealistic" for Nana to stay without Alfie. In EastEnders, her character Nana developed an aortic aneurysm, and before her death, wished to visit the grave of her husband (who had died during World War II) in France. The Normandy-set episode with Alfie and Nana won a British Soap Award for "Best Single Episode" in 2006. Braid left the soap, with Nana's death on 16 December 2005.

== Personal life and death ==
During her later years on EastEnders, Braid was having problems remembering her lines. Her departure from EastEnders proved to be the end of her acting career. She died on 6 November 2007 at the Royal Sussex County Hospital in Brighton, Sussex. She had been diagnosed with Alzheimer's disease shortly after her departure from EastEnders, and subsequently moved into a nursing home in Hove. Braid was married to Brian Badcoe, an actor who died in 1992, and was survived by their son and daughter. Her funeral service took place on 25 November 2007 at Woodvale Crematorium in Brighton.

== Selected filmography ==
=== Film ===
Year	Title	Role	Notes
1959	Twelfth Night	Maria	TV film, for schools
1970	Scrooge	Party Guest	Uncredited
1972	For the Love of Ada	Mrs. Armitage	
1978	Killer's Moon	Mrs. May	
1980	The Wildcats of St Trinian's	Miss Summers	
1996	Kiss and Tell	Gloria Sumner	TV film
1996	101 Dalmatians	Woman on Park Bench	
1997	Mrs Dalloway	Woman in deckchair	
1997	Cold Enough for Snow	Customer at the Dry Cleaners	TV film
1998	Romeo Thinks Again	Mrs. Sudberry	Short

=== Television ===
Year	Title	Role	Notes
1960	No Hiding Place	Alice Flickers	Episode: "Point of Release"
1963	Suspense	Maisie	Story: "The Honest Man"
1965–1966	The Newcomers	Mrs. Harbottle	16 episodes
1966	Armchair Theatre	Joan Fielding	Story: "A Fair Swap"
1967	Softly, Softly	June Parker	Episode: "On the Side of the Law"
1969	The Gold Robbers	Vi Conroy	Episode Rough Trade
1969	Parkin's Patch	Mrs. Durrant	Episode: "Dead or Alive?"
1970	The Borderers	Barbara	Episode: "The Siege of Cocklaws"
1970	Z-Cars	Norah Wardle	Episode: "For Old Time's Sake!" (2 parts)
1970	Catweazel	Aunty Flo	Episode: "The Tricky Lantern"
1971	Play for Today	Major's wife	Story: "Alma Mater"
1971	The Onedin Line	Mrs. Simmons	Episode: "The High Place"
1971	The Expert	Flora Walsh	Episode: "True Confession"
1972	New Scotland Yard	Mrs. White	Episode: "Evidence of Character"
1975	...And Mother Makes Five	Madge	Episode: "Legs Eleven"
1976	Man About the House	Mrs. Hollins	Episode: "The Party's Over"
1976	The Crezz	Molly Smith	Episode: "Gone to the Dogs"
1977	Emmerdale	P. Morphett	3 episodes
1977–1980	Citizen Smith	Mrs Florence Johnson	30 episodes
1978	Rings on Their Fingers	Mrs. Bristow	Episode: "Party Mood"
1979	On Giant's Shoulders	Sister Page	TV Film
1979	In Loving Memory	Gladys Unsworth	Episode: "The Legacy"
1980	Dick Turpin	Abby	Episode: "The Elixir of Life"
1982	L for Lester	Mrs. Davies	6 episodes
1984	Brookside	Molly Partridge	6 episodes
1984	Juliet Bravo	Soroptomist Chairwoman	Episode: "Ducks in a Row"
1985	Oliver Twist	Mrs. Bedwin	3 episodes
1987	The Bill	Mrs. Adler	Episode: "Some You Win Some You Lose"
1990	Campion	Renee Roper	Episode: "Dancers in Mourning - Part 1"
1990	In Sickness and in Health	Companion	Episode: "Bus"
1990	You Rang, M'Lord?	Flo Kendall	Episode: "Royal Flush"
1990	Casualty	Agnes Hartley	Episode: "Say It with Flowers"
1990–1991	Press Gang	Miss McGuigan	2 episodes
1992	One Foot in the Grave	Mrs Skimpson	Episode: "Beware of the Trickster on the Roof"
1994	The 10%ers	Enid	7 episodes
1995	Moving Story	Marie	Episode: "Something Blue"
1996	Lloyds Bank Channel 4 Film Challenge	Sarah	Story: "Cold Season"
1996	Dangerfield	Mrs Blythe	Episode: "Games"
1996–1998	Googlewatch	Gran	15 episodes
1998	The Bill	Mrs. Bourne	Episode: "S.A.D."
1999	Midsomer Murders	Doreen Beavis	Episode: "Dead Man's Eleven"
1999	Bodger & Badger	Miss Piper	2 episodes
2000	Time Gentlemen Please	Old Woman	2 episodes
2001	My Family	Aunt Kate	Episode: "Death and Ben Take a Holiday"
2001	The Bill	Mrs. Flowers	Episode: "Liquid City"
2001	Doctors	Sylvie Connors	Episode: "Old Wives Tales"
2001	ChuckleVision	Mrs Halibut	Episode: "Lost and Floundering"
2002	Ultimate Force	Bank customer	Episode: "The Killing House"
2002	Casualty	Winnie Howard	Episode: "Nobody's Perfect"
2002–2005	EastEnders	Nana Moon	211 episodes
2003	Comic Relief 2003: The Big Hair Do	Nana Moon	Television special
