= Wedding vow renewal ceremony =

Marital service

A wedding vow renewal ceremony or wedding vow reaffirmation ceremony is a ceremony in which a married couple renew or reaffirm their marriage vows. Most ceremonies take place in churches and are seen as a way for a married couple to renew their commitment to each other and demonstrate that the vows they took are still considered sacred; most Christian denominations, such as the Lutheran churches, Catholic Church, Methodist churches and Anglican churches, offer services for a reaffirmation of marriage.

== Popularity ==
The ceremonies have been popular in Italy for decades, and have existed in United States since the 1950s, but only became popular there after the 1970s. To some couples the ceremony offers the chance to celebrate the wedding they never had. Renewal ceremonies often take on the characteristics of the Western "lavish wedding", with couples often setting out guest books, buying new weddings bands, and hiring photographers. Some of the reasons couples mention for holding a vow renewal include having passed through a difficult time in their relationship, celebrating a significant anniversary, or in order to have a religious ceremony if their original wedding had not been one.

In the United Kingdom, the Church of England offers a service called "thanksgiving for marriage" for the renewal of vows. Register offices also offer ceremonies, conducted by registrars but with no legal status, for the renewal of vows. Humanist celebrants also conduct large numbers of non-religious vow renewal ceremonies. Humanist ceremonies reports that these are often popular with couples who did not have the humanist non-religious ceremony they wanted the first time around.

== Annual renewal ==
Some churches hold an annual renewal of vows for married couples who are members of that church, for example, on Saint Valentine's Day. In 2007, the American city of Pittsburgh, Pennsylvania, planned a wedding vow renewal ceremony for 1,000 couples as a part of its 250th city anniversary celebration. In 2009 Miami University held a renewal ceremony for 1,087 couples, all of whom are alumni of the university. In 2016 Western Michigan University held a ceremony for 1,201 couples.
