= Christopher Parker =

English actor and television presenter

- Born: 24 August 1983 (age 43); Lewisham, London, England
- Occupations: Actor and television presenter
- Television: EastEnders (2002–2005); Strictly Come Dancing (2004)

Christopher Parker (born 24 August 1983) is a retired English actor and television presenter, best known for portraying Spencer Moon on BBC One soap opera EastEnders between 2002 and 2005.

== Early career ==
Christopher Parker's career began at an early age as a model appearing in print campaigns and TV commercials. He progressed onto small roles in TV dramas such as The Bill, London's Burning (appearing in the last ever episode) and Judge John Deed. Parker worked as a stunt double in Harry Potter and the Chamber of Secrets. He then came to wider attention in the role of Spencer Moon in the BBC soap opera EastEnders, where he played the younger brother of Alfie Moon, portrayed by British actor Shane Richie.

During his time on EastEnders, he appeared in the first series of Strictly Come Dancing and made it through to the final alongside his partner Hanna Karttunen.

== Recent broadcasting ==
In 2005/06 he worked as a presenter on CD:UK, MTV News, CBBC with Fearne Cotton, Radio Disney and as an entertainment presenter on the morning television show This Morning.

Parker hosted an hour long special called "Bond is Back" for American television about the latest James Bond film, Casino Royale.

He has appeared on CBBC on Hider in the House presented by Jason King and Joel and taken part in ITV2's reality television programme Deadline with chief editor Janet Street-Porter. He was the first celebrity to be sacked by Street-Porter, for refusing to take pictures of famous people without first asking their permission.

He presented Dead Famous Live opposite Gail Porter and was, for a period, the face of the digital music channel Bubble Hits.

Parker appeared in the second series of the BBC's Hotel Babylon opposite Danny Dyer. In 2006 he worked alongside Christian Slater, Nick Moran and Eddie Izzard in a live performance of the Hollywood film The Rogues.

Parker splits his time between Los Angeles and London. In Los Angeles he worked for Fox owned channel TV Guide Channel and also Reelz Channel (a film themed channel).

In 2008, he took part in the Strictly Come Dancing Live Arena Tour and he has acted in Tim Smith's short film Schoolboy and also the feature film Education of Keiron which stars James Wilby. He is also presenting holiday segments for ITV1's This Morning and has a column in Teen Now magazine.

Chris Parker hosted a weekly show on Gala Bingo's TV channel, commencing June 2009.

Christopher took part in a celebrity version of TV show Total Wipeout which aired on 2 January 2010.

== Law career ==
Parker later studied for a law degree at Birkbeck, University of London. He was a final year law student in April 2013. He has expressed a desire to take his law aspirations further after completing his degree, but has encountered problems with many law firms requiring A-level results which, due to his acting experiences when younger, he lacks. As of October 2022, he is a senior consultant at London-based law firm Ignition Law.

== Personal life ==
Parker has completed two London Marathons, one for the charity Barnardo's and the second for the Make Poverty History Campaign and visited Africa with Comic Relief alongside Fearne Cotton. He is also a celebrity supporter for the British Red Cross.

In 2004, he attempted suicide by cutting his wrists and taking an overdose of paracetamol tablets after a woman claimed he lied about their relationship to hide his sexuality. After two friends found him, he was left with no lasting damage, and said the attempt was stupid but that he had reached the stage of desperation. After three weeks of extended leave from EastEnders, he and production staff reached a mutual decision that he would not return to the series.

== Awards ==
- Best new TV talent at the TRIC Awards in 2005
