= Alfie Moon =

Fictional character from EastEnders

- EastEnders character
- Portrayed by: Shane Richie
- Duration: 2002–2005, 2010–2016, 2018–2019, 2022–2026
- First appearance: Episode 2415; 21 November 2002
- Created by: Tony Jordan
- Introduced by: Louise Berridge (2002); Bryan Kirkwood (2010); John Yorke (2018); Chris Clenshaw (2022)
- Spin-off appearances: The Walford Apprentice (2012); Kat & Alfie: Redwater (2017); EastEnders: The Podcast (2018)
- Crossover appearances: East Street (2010)
In-universe information
- Other names: Alfred William Moon; Chris Wright
- Occupation: Barman; Bar manager; Market trader; Pub landlord; Shop manager
- Family: Slater
- Father: Alfred Moon
- Mother: Cherry Moon
- Brothers: Spencer Moon
- Wife: Liza Moon (until 2003): Kat Slater (2003–2013, 2014–2020, 2025–present); Roxy Mitchell (2013–2014)
- Sons: Bert Moon; Ernie Moon
- Daughters: Cherry Slater
- Adoptive sons: Tommy Moon
- Stepsons: Dermott Dolan
- Stepdaughters: Zoe Slater; Amy Mitchell
- Grandfathers: William Moon
- Grandmothers: Nana Moon
- Other relatives: Jake Moon; Danny Moon; Maxwell Moon; Michael Moon; Anthony Moon; Tyler Moon; Eddie Moon; Scarlett Butcher

Alfie Moon is a fictional character from the BBC soap opera EastEnders, played by Shane Richie. He made his first appearance on 21 November 2002, and left on 25 December 2005. He returned on 21 September 2010, following the return of his on-screen wife, Kat Moon (Jessie Wallace), two episodes previously, and they continued to feature until 22 May 2015. Alfie appeared in a guest stint between 26 December 2015 and 25 January 2016, before starring in the six-part drama spin-off series Kat & Alfie: Redwater in 2017. Richie returned for two short stints in 2018, concluding with his exit on 22 January 2019. Richie then made a virtual cameo appearance on 12 July 2022, followed by a permanent return from 12 September 2022.

Some of the character's more prominent storylines have included: his turbulent relationship with Kat Slater (Jessie Wallace); an affair with Kat's sister Little Mo Mitchell (Kacey Ainsworth); the dementia and death of his grandmother Nana Moon (Hilda Braid); believing that Kat's son Tommy Moon had died of cot death, unaware that their neighbour Ronnie Mitchell (Samantha Womack) had switched him with her own deceased child, James Branning; discovering that Kat had been sleeping with Derek Branning (Jamie Foreman); beginning a relationship with Ronnie's sister Roxy Mitchell (Rita Simons) and marrying her, but reuniting with Kat moments after the wedding; Kat's pregnancy with twins—Bert and Ernie Moon, destroying their home by committing arson to get the insurance money; winning the lottery; being diagnosed with a brain tumour; reuniting with Kat until they split again when she discovers that he is the father of Cherry Slater; being diagnosed with prostate cancer; supporting Kat with Tommy's parental abuse; and trying to bring Kat's estranged daughter Zoe (Michelle Ryan) back to Walford.

== Creation and development ==
Alfie Moon was created by EastEnders' scriptwriter Tony Jordan, who based the character on himself. Jordan has commented, "Alfie is basically me—a Jack The Lad in jeans, cowboy boots and dodgy shirts who wears his heart on his sleeve." Julia Crampsie, the BBC's casting executive, recommended that Shane Richie be considered for the role. Richie was already a familiar face to the UK audience, having had a career as an entertainer, appearing in various gameshows, variety shows and fronting advertising campaigns, most notably for the washing detergent Daz. Jordan was apprehensive about casting Richie in the role. He commented, "I just had this image of the guy with the mullet from the Daz adverts. And if we had Shane where would it stop? Harry Hill? Les Dennis? Bradley Walsh? But Julia was insistent, so I went to a workshop where we'd see lots of actors and [Richie] was fantastic."

Jordan has suggested that many of the rows featured on-screen between Alfie and his love-interest Kat were word-for-word arguments he had with his wife, Tracy. He commented, "We'd be watching EastEnders at home, then an Alfie and Kat scene would start and I'd think, 'Oh shit', because I'd know what was coming. And then we'd have another row about how I don't argue properly because when we do argue I'm just making mental notes for stuff to write the next day."

=== Reintroduction (2010) ===
On 7 February 2010, it was announced that Richie would return to the show to reprise the role in autumn 2010. The decision was made following the resignation from the show of Barbara Windsor, who played Peggy Mitchell, which left what executive producer Bryan Kirkwood described as a "hole" in the programme. Kirkwood decided that the time was right for Kat and Alfie to return, saying that they "very much herald the new era of EastEnders." Richie had ruled out a return in 2009, saying that the show had moved on from his character and he felt he did not have the energy to be in such a "full-on" show again. Richie commented on his return: "It's an honour and a privilege to be asked back to the iconic series of EastEnders which is at the top of its game! I'm looking forward to finding out what Alfie has been up to over the last few years but more importantly—what the future has in store for him." John Yorke, controller of BBC drama production, said: "Alfie is one of EastEnders' most loved and iconic characters, so he's bound to get a very warm welcome from viewers when he returns to Walford. We've had so many new and interesting characters settle into Albert Square since Alfie departed that it's going to make for fantastic viewing when one of the show's most familiar faces rides back into the East End." It was reported by The Daily Mirror that Alfie and Kat would regain control of The Queen Victoria public house after it burns down. Controller of BBC drama production John Yorke predicted that their return would make "fantastic viewing", given the wealth of new characters introduced since their departure. Wallace and Richie were the first cast members signed by new executive producer Bryan Kirkwood.

The plot saw Alfie and Kat regaining control of The Queen Victoria public house after it burned down, and Kat returning to Walford pregnant, with some public suspicions about the paternity of her child. To promote the characters' return, the BBC released a trailer across the BBC network in September 2010. The western-themed trailer sees Kat outside of The Queen Victoria, with various characters looking on and Kat saying "Where d'ya get a drink around 'ere?" with Alfie replying "I think you're gonna' need one." The advertisement uses the tag line "It's all kicking off in the square". The return, in September 2010, drew 9.22 million viewers and 37.7% of the total TV viewing audience. Kat returned on 17 September 2010, and Alfie followed on 21 September.

Talking to What's on TV, Wallace commented on Kat's reunion with Alfie. She said: "She punches him! Alfie has come looking for her and hasn't seen her for months. He keeps saying to her 'You're fat' and she says 'I'm not fat. I'm pregnant!' Then she says, 'Don't worry Alfie, it ain't yours'. She's peed off with him. He's been in prison and she's had to survive on her own pregnant. But she loves him unconditionally. No matter what they do, they will always end up together. She wants stability... a future for the baby and her. She sets him this challenge and he buys it."

=== Baby swap ===
"The storyline presented Ronnie with grief, disbelief and anger and the temporary breakdown of her relationship as well as her gradual coming to terms with her loss and the efforts to re-build her life following the tragedy. This underlined the fact to viewers that whilst the loss of baby James was a catalyst, Ronnie's reaction was born out of extreme personal trauma in her life and not as the direct and sole consequence of losing her baby. It is Ofcom's view that the broadcaster did not intend the storyline to suggest that her actions were a typical response of a mother who had experienced SIDS and therefore sufficient editorial context was provided to viewers."

— Ofcom's broadcast bulletin clearing the storyline

Richie revealed in an interview with This Morning that Kat and Alfie would be involved in an ongoing storyline, which he said is "going to be the biggest soap story in probably the history of soaps." At the end of 2010, Kat and Ronnie both give birth on the same day, but Ronnie's baby, James, dies and while Kat is in hospital and her baby, Tommy, is unattended, Ronnie swaps the infants. The storyline received over 6,000 complaints, making it the second most complained about EastEnders storyline. It was then decided to end the storyline earlier than originally planned. It was reported by the Daily Star Sunday that Ronnie experiences a change of heart after visiting relatives in hospital and seeing the midwife who delivered her son. An EastEnders spokesperson said, "We do not comment on future storylines but we have always said Ronnie will do the right thing and Tommy will be reunited with Kat." Wallace revealed that she doesn't regret her involvement of the baby-swap storyline, saying that she was "just doing her job". Wallace told Bang Showbiz: "I stand by it. We're actors at the end of the day, we do our job and then we go home. It's drama, that's it." She also praised Womack's acting and will move on to "bigger and better things" once she departs later this year. She added: "[Samantha is] a fantastic actress who played a brilliant role in a fantastic storyline so I wish her all the best."

Derek Martin said he was surprised by the new baby swap storyline when it was published in the media. Speaking on This Morning, Martin commented: "I'm one of those actors—I don't know how many others do it—but when I get the scripts, I only read my bits. So I looked [and saw], 'Charlie leaves his grandson upstairs, goes downstairs, gets on the drink, gets drunk—the baby's dead'. So that's terrible guilt obviously – because I feel as though it's my fault that he's died. I was surprised when I saw the story come out—because I don't read the others' [lines]—that it was a baby swap." Discussing the surrounding controversy of the plot, Martin added: "Don't forget, there's millions of people—there's 60 odd million here, and they've all got different opinions. Every subject, everything that comes up… everybody will have opinions about that. So therefore you have to accept that's the public—some are for, some are against, and that's the way it is." He continues: "Over the years, don't forget, EastEnders have always had subjects. When [Charlie's] brother had raped Kat and we didn't find out until later on, that was a very strong storyline. And when Little Mo was bashed by her husband Trevor. These stories are all part of real life."

Samantha Womack admitted that she thought the plot was "implausible". She commented: "I thought it was implausible. Most women who lose a child would not go out and abduct one," she told The Mirror. "But Ronnie is a soap character and she is not necessarily representing real life. Soap is based on controversy and sensationalism because bosses are trying to get high ratings and they can't write things like 'Ronnie had a cup of tea'. Otherwise people wouldn't watch it." On 1 August 2011, Ofcom cleared the storyline. The baby swap storyline prompted a huge 1,044 complaints reported to Ofcom. Ofcom also added that many of the complaints were made because the storyline was presented "in an offensive manner" because it "appeared to suggest that a mother who has suddenly and tragically lost a baby through cot death would react by stealing another baby to replace that loss". Kym Marsh supported Ofcom's decision to clear the storyline. Marsh wrote in her magazine section: "Last week, EastEnders was cleared of wrongdoing by Ofcom, the media regulator, over its baby swap storyline, and I think that's the right decision. It's just a storyline, like any other. I understand why people got upset about it, but no-one meant to upset anybody. Soaps are supposed to portray real life to a certain extent, but it's meant to be high drama for entertainment purposes. I mean, how many murders can you have in one square? There's a nod to real life but, for the most part, soaps help take people out of the real world."

=== Arson ===
On 27 July 2014, it was reported that a fire would engulf the Slater house after being started by an unreported character. The incident leaves one character with "life-threatening injuries". A show insider later confirmed that Kat would be left with burn injuries following the fire, sparking a new story for the character. On 4 September 2014, it was announced that Alfie would set fire to the house in an insurance scam after encountering financial problems. Richie explained that Alfie "resorts to desperate measures" as he feels this is his last option after becoming behind on rent payments. The story was scheduled as part of the show's "dramatic September storylines" and was billed as "classic EastEnders" by executive producer Dominic Treadwell-Collins. Alfie sets the house alight unaware that Kat is inside, but when he realises, he rushes back home to save her, just as the house explodes. Treadwell-Collins commented, "Bombs that we have been carefully planting over the last few months are about to explode all over the Square as some of our most iconic characters' lives change forever." A trailer was released on the same day to promote the story.

Alfie starts the fire in a bin in the living room. Richie explained that Alfie hopes to get some money from the insurance company and thinks he will only cause minor smoke damage. He added that Alfie does not view his actions as arson, commenting, "Arson is a big word and that's not how Alfie looks at it." After leaving the house, Alfie receives a call from Kat, who reveals that she is the house. Richie stated that Alfie panics about where the rest of his family are too, and races to the house. When he gets there, the fire reaches Mo's dodgy hair products and the house explodes. Richie performed elements of the stunt explosion using crash mats, although some aspects had to be performed by a stunt double. The actor enjoyed working with the stunt double and thought they looked alike. During filming, the door framework actually sets on fire, so the fire brigade were called. Richie found filming the stunt exciting.

Alfie enters the house to save Kat, which he does successfully. Richie told Alison Gardner of Soaplife that Alfie is "terrified that the people he loves are in danger". Peter Beale (Ben Hardy) and Johnny Carter (Sam Strike) follow Alfie into the building to save people. Richie noted that Alfie does not realise this, which adds to his guilt. Reflecting on his character's actions, Richie commented, "He does a bad thing for the right reasons." Kat's life is left in danger. Richie thought that Alfie would not cope if Kat died and quipped, "I don't how the whole country would feel if Alfie was responsible for Kat's death!"

=== Departure (2015) and spin-off series ===
On 3 April 2015, it was announced that Wallace and Richie would reprise their respective roles as Kat and Alfie in a standalone six-part BBC One drama series based in Ireland. Originally named Redwater, the show was eventually branded Kat & Alfie: Redwater. The characters depart EastEnders to appear in the show, but Treadwell-Collins claimed that their exit from the main show would be "worth the wait". He felt that it was a good opportunity to take the characters "out of their comfort zone". Charlotte Moore, the Controller of BBC One, commented, "Rest assured, their rollercoaster isn't set to end any time soon." Richie and Wallace expressed their delight at the commission, with the former commenting, "To have a whole drama focused around Kat and Alfie is a huge honour for us both".

The series is created by Treadwell-Collins, and written and produced by creatives from EastEnders. Treadwell-Collins expressed the team's excitement about the drama and stated that he look forward to "taking our style of storytelling to a place of stories, myth, secrets and immeasurable beauty." Speaking to a reporter from the Radio Times, he admitted that he always aspired to create a related series to EastEnders and felt that Kat and Alfie were ideal for the show. As a primarily standalone drama, it features new characters and is not solely focused on Kat and Alfie's stories. No reference to EastEnders is included in Redwater, with Richie confirming that the only nod was Alfie mentioning he had experience working in a pub. The show was initially scheduled to film in autumn 2015 and broadcast in 2016, but was later pushed back by a year.

Redwater is set up within the main show prior to the characters' departures. Treadwell-Collins teased that there would be "several huge twists for Kat and Alfie Moon that will change their lives forever", and the spin-off would allow the characters to seek answers to "some very big questions". This begins when the characters become millionaires after a scratch card win. Richie admitted that he and Wallace were confused how this connects to the drama, but Treadwell-Collins explained to them how it "sets them on a journey". Discussing the pair's feelings towards the win, Richie pointed out that Alfie feels "ecstatic" and believes they are due this, while Kat worries that it is "too good to be true". After discussing how to spend the money, Kat confesses that she wants to leave Walford for pastures new. They consider joining Spencer in Australia, but settle on returning to Spain. Richie told Daniel Kilkelly (Digital Spy) that Kat and Alfie are "really excited" about moving and the decision is well received by their friends and family. He added that although they associate leaving Walford with moving past their history, "little do they know the baggage they're actually taking with them!"

"It's just the biggest curveball I think Alfie has ever been thrown in his 13 years that I've been there. I've told very few people about it at the moment, but it is a major, major, curveball. It will be interesting to see the reaction. Just when you think they're finding happiness, something like this happens. It's a dark secret which Alfie takes to Ireland with him."

— Richie on Alfie's brain tumour

Writers established the stories for Redwater prior to the characters' exit: it is revealed that Kat unknowingly gave birth to a son, and Alfie discovers that he has a brain tumour. The new stories were not announced prior to transmission and Richie had to keep the tumour story a secret. He dubbed it "the biggest curveball I think Alfie has ever been thrown in his 13 years". Alfie conceals his secret and refuses to acknowledge it. Richie sympathised with Alfie, commenting, "Just when you think they're finding happiness, something like this happens." The characters depart EastEnders in episode 5072, first broadcast on 22 May 2015.

In October 2015, it was confirmed that Richie and Wallace would return for a guest stint over the Christmas period, where their character's stories would be explored further prior to Redwater. Treadwell-Collins teased that their return would "lead to tears, laughter and a mountain of secrets being unearthed for the Slater family". He added that during the return, Kat would learn about her son, sparking the reason behind Redwater. Richie expressed his delight at returning to the show and portraying scenes which "set the scene for [Kat and Alfie's] new life in Ireland." Alfie returns in episode 5199, which premiered on 26 December 2015, when he follows Kat back to Walford with the children after she left abruptly. Alfie then departs with Kat in episode 5217, first broadcast on 25 January 2016. Appearing on This Morning, Richie confirmed that he and Wallace would not return to EastEnders following Redwater.

Richie filmed Redwater between April and August 2016. He envisioned the series to run for multiple series and commented, "With the storylines we've heard I'd be very surprised if it wasn't a long runner." The drama premiered in May 2017, running for six episodes until 22 June. Alfie's ill health is revisited in Redwater. Richie explained that he enters a downward spiral during the series as he "comes to term with the fact that he may die". He praised the writing of the story and wanted the audience to sympathise with Alfie. Throughout promotion of the series, it was reported that Kat and Alfie could be killed off during the series. In the show's closing moments, Alfie underwent an operation on his tumour but flatlined on the operating table, leaving viewers unaware as to the character's fate. It was confirmed on 20 September 2017 that Redwater had been cancelled and would not return for a second series.

=== Returns (2018) ===
In January 2018, Richie confirmed that he had been invited back to EastEnders but declined the offer in favour of a break from television. A show spokesperson explained that the option to return would be available for Richie and producers were prepared to wait until he was ready to commit to filming. Wallace's return had been announced during the previous month and the Metro's Duncan Lindsay observed that viewers expected Richie to follow suit. However, Richie later told a reporter from The Daily Express that he was interested in returning to the soap and that his wife was "desperate" to return.

It was reported in March 2018 that Richie would reprise his role, although the show's publicity team declined to comment on the reports. Alfie made an unannounced return to the soap in episode 5712, first broadcast on 24 May 2018, when he meets up with Kat's cousin Hayley Slater (Katie Jarvis) in a hotel room. Following this, it was confirmed Richie had returned for two episodes, although the actor expected Alfie to return again. Richie was invited back to the soap by executive consultant John Yorke as part of his plans to rebuild the Slater family. The show's production team went to extreme lengths to maintain the secrecy of Alfie's return by using code names, censoring scripts and transporting Richie into the studios using cars with blacked out windows. Alfie returns during a week of episodes predominantly focusing on a knife crime story, which further added to the surprise.

Alfie's return explores his absence from the show since his last appearance in Redwater as well as his connection to Hayley. Richie explained that the return "raises more questions", creating stories for other characters. Since his last appearance in Redwater, Alfie returned to Spain with Kat and the children but they have since become estranged. During the episodes, it was revealed that Alfie is the father of Hayley's unborn baby and that Kat and Alfie separated after she had an affair and neglected the children. Stephanie Chase from Digital Spy dubbed the twists "a lot of information to take in at once". Speaking to Hayley, Alfie demands that she terminate the pregnancy. Richie enjoyed filming with Jarvis as she was new to the soap.

On 6 September 2018, it was announced that Richie had recommenced filming and Alfie would return later in the year. The length of his return was unconfirmed. Alfie returns after contacting Kat and surprises her in person. Their reunion was billed as "explosive". Another story explored upon his return is Hayley's pregnancy after she did not terminate the baby. Alfie returns in episodes 5812–5813, first broadcast on 15 November 2018, when he meets up with Kat. She is excited to reunite with her children, but are disappointed when Alfie reveals they are in Spain. Producers decided to make Alfie and Hayley's story about the paternity of Cherry Slater the focus of the Christmas episodes. It was reported that the episodes would feature "some 'classic' Slater scenes". The show's publicity team teased that "at least one person is left with blood on their hands".

Writers created a twist in the show's Christmas episode when Hayley pushes Alfie down the stairs, causing him to bang his head, after the truth about Cherry's father is exposed. Prior to the attack, Alfie "[unleashes] an epic rant about the Slater women". Kilkelly (Digital Spy) theorised that could be a "typical soapy tactic" to make the audience dislike him before an exit. It was announced in December 2018 that Richie had been cast in musical Everybody's Talking About Jamie, sparking questions that he could leave EastEnders again. Alfie survives his fall and takes a more active role in Cherry's life. Struggling financially, Alfie secures a loan from Phil Mitchell (Steve McFadden) but soon disappears. This marks Richie's departure from the soap and Alfie departs in episode 5855, broadcast on 22 January 2019. Executive producer Kate Oates praised the actor for creating "such an icon in Alfie" and for his leading performance at Christmas. Oates wanted to explore a fresh direction for Kat, but did not rule a future return for Alfie.

=== Reintroduction (2022) ===
In July 2022, it was announced that Richie would reprise the role later that year. Alfie's return sparks trouble for Kat's new relationship with Phil Mitchell. The actor was invited back to the soap by new executive producer Chris Clenshaw, who created "some wonderful storylines" for the character. Clenshaw teased that viewers should expect "fun, frolics and, of course, the odd porky-pie" to follow Alfie. Richie expressed his delight at returning to the soap. Clenshaw echoed this, commenting, "Shane Richie created one of the most iconic, loveable and most memorable characters in soap, and to welcome him back to Walford is an absolute pleasure". Although Alfie's return was scheduled for later in 2022, show bosses advised the audience to watch for clues surrounding his return in upcoming episodes. Richie makes a cameo appearance in episode 6519, broadcast on 12 July 2022, when he speaks to Tommy over a video call. However, their relationship appears fraught, causing Tommy to seek comfort from Phil instead. He then returns in person in episode 6554, broadcast on 12 September 2022, when he turns up unexpectedly at Kat's doorstep on her wedding day. His return scenes were previewed in a show trailer for September 2022.

=== Prostate cancer ===
In August 2023, it was reported that Alfie would be diagnosed with prostate cancer in an upcoming storyline, with EastEnders working closely with Prostate Cancer UK, Macmillan Cancer Support and other experts in the field to portray the illness accurately. Discussing the storyline, executive producer Chris Clenshaw said: "When we first embarked on this storyline we knew it was imperative that we worked alongside Prostate Cancer UK and Macmillan Cancer Support to take on and accurately portray such an emotional and pivotal storyline for Alfie, and one that many viewers may relate to. Shane has thoughtfully portrayed the realities of being diagnosed with prostate cancer with grace and understanding. We hope that this storyline resonates with the audience, and that we represent it as sensitively, and as accurately as possible".

Amy Rylance, from Prostate Cancer UK, made the statement: "It's been a pleasure working alongside EastEnders on their prostate cancer storyline, and we salute the BBC for approaching Prostate Cancer UK to ensure the narrative is as close to real life as possible. Every man's experience of prostate cancer is unique, and it's so important for viewers to be given accurate information about the disease. It's been a privilege to provide insight into Alfie Moon's journey with prostate cancer, ensuring an authentic story is told every step of the way. Introducing Shane to one of our supporters affected by prostate cancer gave him the opportunity to understand what it's like to experience the disease first-hand". Dany Bell, from Macmillan Cancer Support, added: "Storylines like Alfie's play a vital role in helping to raise awareness of the signs and symptoms of prostate cancer and the impact a cancer diagnosis can have on individuals and their families. We also know that men can often find it difficult to talk about cancer, to protect the people around them or simply wanting to stay strong. We hope that seeing a character like Alfie go through this experience will help open up these vital conversations and highlight the array of support that's out there".

== Storylines ==
=== 2002–2005 ===
Alfie Moon first appears when he is ejected from Walford East tube station for fare evasion. He then causes havoc in the local market by getting a refund from Winston (Ulric Browne) for a video he stole and tricking Martin Fowler (James Alexandrou) into giving him free fruit. After acquainting himself with a few residents, he sneaks into The Queen Victoria public house and helps himself to a drink behind the bar. The landlady, Peggy Mitchell (Barbara Windsor), assumes that Alfie is Chris Wright (Tom Roberts), a new bar manager sent by an agency. Alfie takes advantage of the misunderstanding to commit identity fraud against Wright. Alfie packs any stock he could find in a bin bag, ready to leave. Jim Branning (John Bardon) catches him, but assumes Alfie is throwing away outdated stock and tricks Alfie into giving him a pint on the house. Winston, Martin, Ricky Butcher (Sid Owen) and Sam Mitchell (Kim Medcalf) realize that Alfie has told them all different background stories but he manages to reconcile the inconsistent stories. Alfie later answers the phone to the real Chris Wright and tells him the position is filled, revealing his intention to stay. Alfie's brother and grandmother arrive unannounced in Albert Square and move into the pub with Alfie, much to his dismay. When Alfie is blackmailed by a former police officer, Dougie Slade (John Bowler), who reveals Alfie's true identity to Peggy, Alfie and his family are forced to flee with the pub's takings. However, Alfie leaves the money on Peggy's doorstep. Peggy manages to track him down and after he confides in her about his parents' death, she gives him another chance. Alfie reluctantly accepts her proposal.

Alfie shares a bond with barmaid Kat Slater (Jessie Wallace) and an attraction develops. Eventually Kat reciprocates his feelings and one night when the pub is closed, Kat reveals her feelings to him. They decide to embark on their relationship slowly, but his inability to trust her causes her to rethink the romance and she breaks up with Alfie, within less than a week. Alfie is heartbroken when Kat returns from a trip to New York with local mobster Andy Hunter (Michael Higgs), who soon becomes engaged to Kat after the trip. Andy, knowing Alfie's feelings for Kat, warns him to stay away from her and the wedding. Before the wedding, Kat visits Alfie's grandmother, Nana Moon (Hilda Braid) in hospital, and thinking she is asleep, admits she still loves Alfie. Nana tells Alfie and he rushes to the wedding to confess his true feelings as the ceremony takes place. Kat jilts Andy and he swears revenge before leaving Walford. Alfie and Kat quickly get engaged and decide to hold the wedding on Christmas Day, less than a month away. However, Alfie is still married to his first wife, Liza (Joanne Adams). Liza's mother, Marlene (Christine Ellerbeck) tells Alfie that their divorce is finalised, so he starts to prepare the wedding to Kat, until Liza reveals they are not divorced. There are only a few days before the wedding so he tries to quickly finalise the divorce while trying to keep it secret from Kat, though Liza makes it difficult as she wants Alfie to take her back. Alfie is forced to cancel the minister on Christmas Day and he panics, but gets his friend Ray (David Walliams) to pretend to be a minister, while planning to tell Kat the truth a few days later. Alfie's brother, Spencer Moon (Christopher Parker), warns Alfie not to start his marriage with a lie, so Alfie reveals the truth to a furious Kat. Alfie is about to tell the guests that the wedding is cancelled when his solicitor enters with Alfie's decree absolute. Alfie convinces the minister to cancel his Christmas lunch, and Alfie and Kat marry.

After a while, Alfie borrows several thousand pounds from Andy to bail out Kat's father, Charlie Slater (Derek Martin), who has been arrested for assault. Andy begins demanding cash every week, which he knows Alfie cannot afford. Andy's plan to wreck the Moons' marriage starts to work and Andy offers Kat the chance to pay off the debt by spending time with him in bed. She reluctantly agrees and they sleep together, with a reluctant Kat oozing with guilt. Though unknown to her, Alfie has paid Andy the money. Andy keeps the money and gives Alfie a video tape of Kat cheating on Alfie with him. They watch the sex tape together and she reveals the whole story behind her infidelity. When Alfie insults Kat, she slaps him, with him doing the same thing. Afterwards, the couple attempt to put the incident behind them but their marriage starts to deteriorate and Alfie is unable to trust Kat. She moves out of Walford for while. During her return, it is seen that Kat has become an alcoholic and isn't bothered by the fact that Alfie wants them to resume their marriage. Kat has sex with Roger (Russell Boulter), a stranger, while intoxicated and finally sees sense, deciding to return to Alfie, but he discovers she has slept with a man she doesn't know and throws her out, so she leaves Walford again.

Alfie shares a mutual connection with Kat's sister, Little Mo Mitchell (Kacey Ainsworth), whose marriage to Billy Mitchell (Perry Fenwick) has collapsed. Alfie helps Little Mo bring up her baby, Freddie, and they decide to announce that they are an item. However, Kat returns before they have a chance, and she makes it clear that she wants Alfie back. He is torn between the two sisters, eventually choosing Kat. He lets Little Mo down gently, and they share a final goodbye hug, which Billy assumes is them getting together. In the pub, Billy drunkenly announces that Alfie and Little Mo are an item. Kat is furious and decides not to get together with Alfie, so as not to break her sister's heart. However, Alfie and Kat continue to grow closer, due to Kat's relationship with Alfie's grandmother, who is dying. After Kat helps Alfie complete some of Nana's final wishes and overcome her death, they long for each other. Alfie announces that he is leaving to drive across the United States in a Ford Capri, and it seems he has gone for good when he waves goodbye to a heartbroken Kat on Christmas Day 2005. After getting drunk and drowning her sorrows in the pub, Kat is stunned to see Alfie waiting for her outside. Kat and Alfie then get into the car together and drive off.

=== 2010–2016 ===
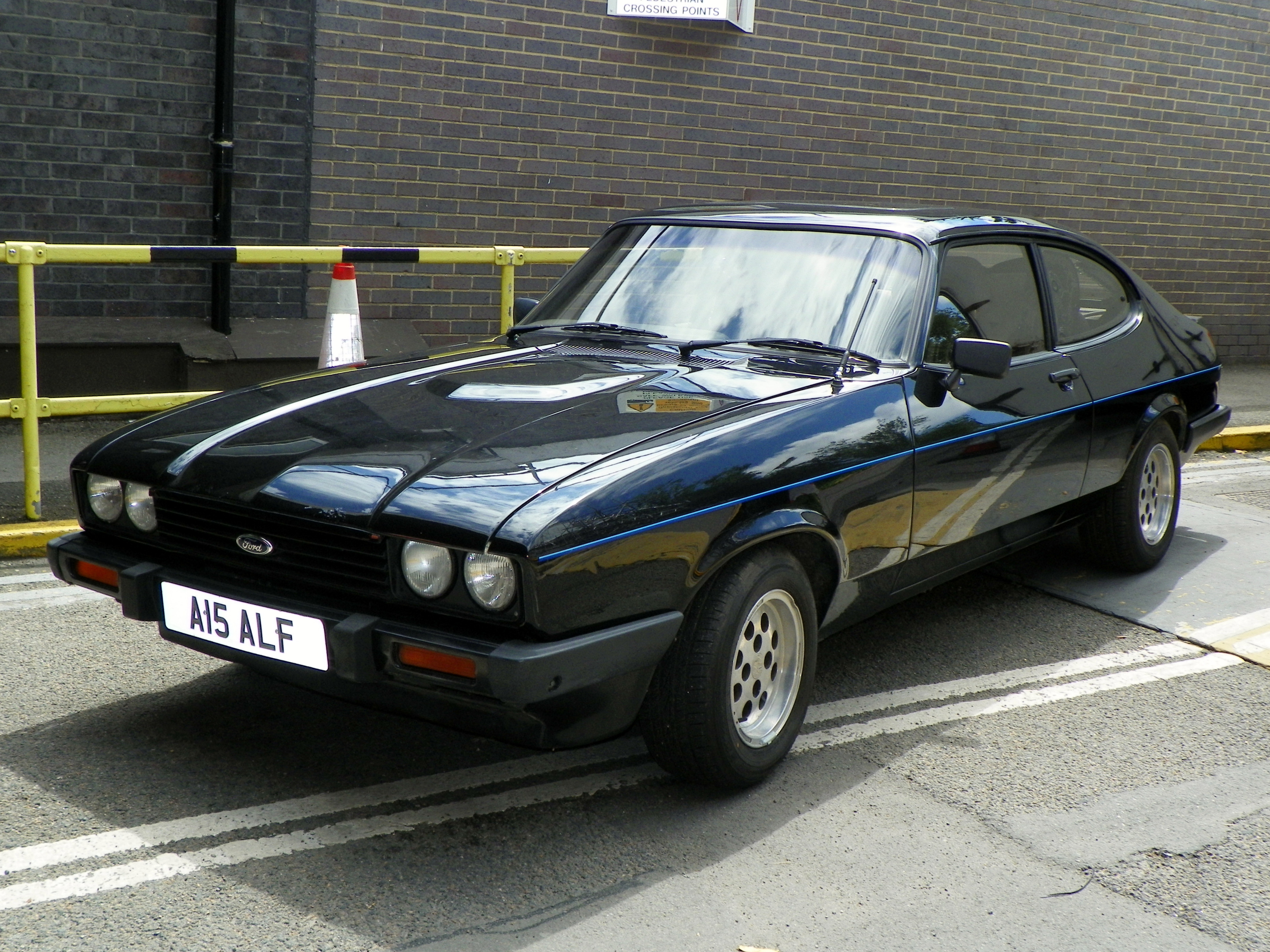
Alfie Moon's Ford Capri, on display at the EastEnders Meet and Greet event.

Kat returns to London, revealing that she and Alfie conned a man called Frankie Finnerty and she is now on the run. His relatives Lee and Jono Finnerty (Dylan Brown and Colin Parry) track her down but Alfie scares them off by pretending to be a CID officer, though they take most of Kat's money. Alfie and Kat have a heart to heart and it is revealed that Alfie spent six months in prison for property fraud and they tried to have a baby but he has fertility problems. Kat is not interested and tries to leave, telling him that she is pregnant and he is not the father. Alfie doubles the remainder of Kat's money in a bet and promises to stop scamming and get a proper job. Kat gives him 24 hours. He uses Kat's money and uses it to rent The Queen Vic from Phil Mitchell (Steve McFadden). Kat is angry and demands he get the money back as they need a regular income. Instead, he sets up an illegal drinking den in the cellar and they move into Kim Fox's (Tameka Empson) caravan on the Square.

Alfie hires Greg Jessop (Stefan Booth) to refurbish The Queen Vic and Alfie's cousin, Michael Moon (Steve John Shepherd), gives him money for The Queen Vic lease. He introduces Michael to Kat and Michael says that he is returning to Spain and asks her to go with him. He leaves a letter and some money for Alfie, revealing that he is the baby's father. Alfie tells Kat that he wants the baby but she doesn't believe him and agrees to leave with Michael but changes her mind when she sees that Alfie has bought a cot and some baby toys. Alfie struggles to pay the rent and tries gambling again but loses. However, Phil's cousin Roxy Mitchell (Rita Simons) helps out by paying two months rent for him and he shows Kat the newly refurbished pub. However, on the day of the grand opening, there is a problem so the pub doesn't open until the next day. Kat sees Alfie and Roxy together and fights with Roxy. Alfie takes Roxy's side and ejects Kat but they reconcile and Alfie suggests renewing their wedding vows and Kat agrees. The day does not go quite according to plan as Alfie helps Roxy with her sister Ronnie Mitchell's (Samantha Womack) wedding. However, Kat decides that she does not need a big ceremony so she and Alfie have one in the Square with just him and Kat.

Kat gives birth to a boy named Tommy but is rushed to hospital as she haemorrhages, due to a damaged placenta. Charlie decides to join the New Year's party, rather than stay with Tommy so he is unattended when Ronnie Mitchell finds herself in The Queen Vic with her dead son and she swaps the babies. When Alfie gets home, he finds "Tommy" dead in his cot. Kat and Alfie struggle to cope with their loss but eventually start to deal with it until Michael returns, wanting to see his son. Kat tells Michael to leave but he stays because he has friends locally. Kat kisses Michael but he rejects her, leading her to break down. Eventually Alfie moves out after they have a row and goes away for a weekend with Michael. Kat tells Alfie that a coroner has confirmed that Tommy (James) died of Sudden Infant Death Syndrome. He comforts her and they reconcile. Eventually, Ronnie admits to Kat that she swapped the babies and returns Tommy. Alfie and Kat are reunited with Tommy after talking to a social worker. Ronnie goes to prison for her crime and Kat forgives her. She and Alfie holiday in Spain, leaving Alfie's cousin, Eddie Moon (David Essex), to look after the pub. When they return, they bring Shenice Quinn (Lily Harvey) with them, daughter of Kat's friend, Martina Quinn (Tamara Wall). Kat finds out she is pregnant and Alfie asks who the father is, refusing to believe Kat has not cheated. Alfie realises he has gone too far but Kat is not interested in his apologies, even after she miscarries. She tells him she does not want any more children and that their relationship will just be for show from now on, leading her to have a one-night stand with Mark Garland (Chris Simmons), which she regrets after hearing Alfie's voicemail, saying how much he loves her. Alfie takes Kat, Tommy and Shenice on holiday but when they return, Kat tells Alfie that she cheated. They discuss it and Alfie insists that he would rather Kat cheat on him than not have her in his life. Kat isn't happy and is further upset when Alfie will not allow her to explain that she did not cheat again. They try to mend things over Christmas but Alfie hears Kat say that she does not think he loves her. Alfie pays a friend Gerry (Paul Reynolds) to claim he is a marriage counsellor and tell Kat that their marriage can be mended. However, when Alfie deliberately leaves them alone, she says she thinks Alfie does not love her and she wants to end the marriage. Gerry tries to tell Alfie but he thinks that Gerry has helped. When Charlie has a stroke, Alfie and Kat visit but he returns alone. Derek Branning (Jamie Foreman) gets Alfie into a VAT scam and Alfie helps Roxy and Billy set Derek up by intercepting his alcohol deliveries. Alfie struggles financially and considers firing Jean and stores Derek's goods at the pub to earn extra cash but when Phil demands Alfie stop, Derek arranges with Alfie and Billy to steal a large amount of alcohol. However, Derek is scammed by Alfie and Billy and he suspects Phil conned him. When Billy is arrested on suspicion of murdering Heather Trott (Cheryl Fergison), Derek worries that he may implicate them in the alcohol theft and asks Alfie to frame Phil by hiding goods at his garage. However, Alfie is caught and Phil confronts him, making it clear that Alfie takes orders from him, not Derek. When Derek learns that Alfie has told Phil everything, he furiously threatens Alfie.

In Kat's absence, Alfie and Roxy become close friends and Roxy tells Alfie that she is in love with him. This makes things awkward and she quits her job at the pub. After a while, Alfie manages to convince Roxy to return and offers her a place to stay. Jean is conned out of money that belongs to The Queen Victoria while Alfie is away and when he returns, he borrows money from Roxy to pay the bills, angering Kat. Alfie starts a pub football team and pays more attention to that than to Kat, so she starts an affair. Kat tries to resist but eventually the affair turns to love. When Kat's lover sends her flowers, Alfie becomes suspicious and asks Kat if she is seeing someone else. She denies it initially but eventually admits it, refusing to say who the other man is. Alfie demand Kat end the affair but Alfie struggles to trust Kat, especially when he finds a ring he thought had been pawned. Wanting to catch her out, Alfie says he will be away overnight and follows her to a nearby flat, demanding to know who Kat is seeing but she still refuses to name him. Alfie finds a letter to "Mr. Branning" and confronts the three brothers, attacking Max when he sees that Kat is calling. Kat arrives and tells him that she is seeing Derek. Alfie throws Kat out again and Derek makes matters worse when he plays Alfie a message, asking to meet. Alfie punches Derek and tells him that he is barred before giving Derek his wedding ring to give to Kat. Alfie starts dating Roxy and asks her to move in and they declare their love for each other. Alfie helps Kat when she is questioned over stolen goods, but to prove to Roxy that he loves her, Alfie decides to get a divorce. Alfie and Roxy decide to try for a baby, but when Kat and Alfie's decree nisi comes through, it is apparent that Alfie still loves Kat. He is determined to move on so proposes to Roxy and she accepts.

Alfie discovers Ronnie is being released from prison but thinks that she will not return to Walford. He is angry to discover that she has and demands Roxy choose, him or Ronnie. Roxy chooses Alfie but Kat persuades him to accept Ronnie's presence and let Roxy see her sister. Kat supports Alfie after Michael's death and the two become closer. The night before his wedding, Alfie visits Kat and they kiss passionately. On his wedding day, Alfie tells Ian Beale (Adam Woodyatt) that he still loves Kat but marries Roxy. Roxy realises that Alfie is still in love with Kat and orders him out of the church. He learns that Kat is going to Ibiza and races to the airport. They reconcile, moments before her flight is due to depart. As revenge for Alfie's treatment of Roxy, Phil sells The Queen Vic, forcing Alfie and Kat out. Kat tells Alfie that she is pregnant and they move in with Kat's grandmother, Mo Harris (Laila Morse). Kat has a market stall, selling women's clothes, but Alfie isn't as successful as goes to help Spencer in Australia for a while. He returns a month later and tells Kat that he has just bought a classic Ford Capri. After a night in a posh hotel, they return to Walford and Alfie sets up a burger bar on the Square but this is taken away so he sets up a men's clothes stall instead. This doesn't last thanks to a feud with the market inspector, Aleks Shirovs (Kristian Kiehling), so he gets a job at Ian's café. Kat and Alfie are thrilled when their twin sons, Bert and Ernie (Freddie and Stanley Beale), are born.

Alfie receives a letter from the council, stating that they are due to be evicted from No. 23 Albert Square. He does not tell Kat but Stacey Slater (Lacey Turner) Stacey finds it and forces him to tell Kat and Mo. Alfie tells Kat that he has got a bank loan but considers starting a fire for the insurance money. Despite Mick Carter (Danny Dyer) advising him against it, he drops a lit cigarette into a paper-filled wastebasket. When outside, he learns Kat is in the house and rushes back to rescue her but Mo's stash of dodgy hairspray causes an explosion, just as Alfie opens the front door. He rescues Kat regardless, receiving minor burns, but Kat is badly burnt. Alfie and the Moons are supported by the local community and stay with the Masood family. Alfie is praised as a hero, despite being suspected by local firefighter Tosh. However, the fire investigation officer declares the fire an accident but Mick advises him not to tell Kat that he started the fire and when Kat thanks him for saving her life, he takes Mick's advice. He is relieved when the fire investigation officer Neil Wallace informs him that the insurers will probably pay for the damage to be repaired but Stacey finds the picture of Nana Moon and realises Alfie started the fire and demands Alfie tell Kat but he refuses, creating a rift between them. The insurance company also refuse to pay for the damage as Mo's quantity of hairspray is listed as commercial goods, invalidating the policy. He tells Stacey and she suggests ringing the insurance company again but Alfie refuses, adamant that they won't change their decision and blames Mo. Stacey then suggests Alfie use the proceeds from selling the Capri to sort out their finances but he can't as the money was spent on food and the children. Masood Ahmed (Nitin Ganatra) returns home and asks Alfie when they will be moving out as the house is too crowded but Alfie loses his temper with Masood and accuses him of kicking them out.

Needing a place of their own, Alfie tries to persuade an estate agent to let him stay in number 43 for a couple of nights but the agent dismisses the idea. So he goes to the council for temporary accommodation and is told that all they can offer is one night in a bed and breakfast. Returning to the Square, Alfie tells Stacey about the mess they're in and she insists he tell Kat the truth but before he can, she asks him to marry her. He agrees and they marry at the registrar's office with two nurses as witnesses and return to Walford. They squat in a couple of places before Mick invites them to stay at The Queen Vic. After an emotional speech from Kat to the social housing manager, they are offered a council house in Hull but just as they are about to leave, Kat finds a photo of Nana. Wanting to know how it survived the fire, Alfie admits that he started it and tries to apologise, but Kat leaves him, moving in with Stacey and Lily. Later, as Christmas approaches, Alfie tells Kat that he will try to fix things.

Mo tells Kat that Harry left her some money in his will. Alfie finds out, and tries to convince her to use the money to make a fresh start after the divorce but she destroys the cheque, insisting it doesn't change the past nor their impending divorce. Kat has second thoughts about the divorce after Pam Coker (Lin Blakley) gives a speech about love and family and Stacey tells Alfie that their rent is increasing and Kat is struggling financially so Alfie invites Kat to his flat for lunch and they reminisce about their relationship. The next day, Kat lashes out at Alfie for leaving leftovers for the kids, but at Stacey's urging, she agrees to be his date to Ian and Jane's wedding if he makes more effort for making up for the fire.

Mo has Harry's money transferred to her account and tells Alfie. He insists that this is not good for Kat and tells her so she burns the money. Sadly, this makes her very depressed and she tries to commit suicide but Alfie finds her and calls an ambulance. At the hospital, he admits that he is still in love with her. He takes her home and decides to stay temporarily to help her with the kids and her assessment by Social Services. During the social worker's visit, Kat is withdrawn and won't answer questions, insisting she is fine but Alfie tells the social worker that they are working on it and admits feeling guilty for starting the fire. After Kat visits a convent (Zoe's birthplace), she makes peace with the past and tells Alfie and Stacey that she will claim the money. Alfie and Stacey discover that Kat's claim won't grant her any money so he takes Kat on a trip to central London, giving them a chance to reminisce before having lunch at a posh restaurant. Kat knows that she won't get any compensation and is disgusted when Alfie tells her he already knew. Soon after, Kat takes the opportunity to tell Alfie that she wants them to reconcile and although initially resisting, he changes his mind once back in Walford. On the spur of the moment, they buy a scratchcard and realise they have won £1,000,000. Alfie and Kat decide to use the money to move somewhere new and run a bar. Alfie suggests going to Australia but he and Kat decide to return to Spain so she can be closer to Zoe. But after tests, a doctor tells Alfie he may have a brain tumour. Kat buys plane tickets for the next day and Alfie chooses not to tell Kat about the tumour and ignore warnings that the tumour will grow. Sonia Fowler (Natalie Cassidy) also advises him not to fly as this could cause problems so they drive to Spain.

On Christmas Day 2015, Kat returns to Walford to spend Christmas with Stacey. Alfie follows with the boys. While at Mick's stag party, Alfie tells Ian and Phil that he may have a brain tumour. Ian and Phil go with him to a hospital appointment, where he learns that the tumour has stopped growing but he may need an operation if he begins showing symptoms. Alfie tells Kat about his tumour and in turn, Kat tells Alfie that she has a son living in Ireland. After Charlie dies from a heart attack, Kat and Alfie decide to search for her son. After saying their goodbyes, Kat and Alfie depart.

=== Kat & Alfie: Redwater ===
In episode 1 of Kat & Alfie: Redwater, Alfie, Kat and Tommy arrive in the Irish town of Redwater, saying they are on holiday. Alfie tells Kat to make friends before asking questions and trying to find her son and when she immediately thinks it is Andrew Kelly (Peter Campion), Alfie warns her that she could be wrong. Alfie starts to have visions and gets scared when he goes outside in the night and almost falls from a cliff. Alfie finds out about the Redwater Tragedy from local priest, Dermott Dolan (Oisín Stack), in which Dermott's mother, Iris Dolan (Orla Hannon) drowned in a boating accident. In episode 2, Alfie gets stuck up a cliff when helping Tommy, but Dermott rescues him. Tommy goes missing but Kat finds him in the church and discovers that Dermott is her son. In episode 3, Alfie realises that Kat lied to Dermott about who Dermott's father is, which results in an argument. By episode 5, Alfie is worried about his hallucinations and has a brain scan, lying to Kat about where he is going. He then tells Dermott that his tumour has grown and asks Dermott to baptise him, which he does. In episode 6, Alfie prepares for an operation on his brain, and is told his recovery could take weeks so he will be unable to return to Spain as planned. He asks Dermott to bring Kat to the hospital, but Dermott does not do this because the police suspect he was involved in the death of Lance Byrne (Ian McElhinney). Alfie is unable to wait and during the surgery, Alfie loses his pulse and at the same time, Kat is seriously injured in a boating accident caused by Dermott's attempting to escape. Medical staff start to resuscitate Alfie as the episode ends.

=== 2018–2019 ===
Having recovered from his operation, Alfie and Kat return to Spain to run a bar. Mo returns in March 2018 and reveals that Kat and Alfie had an argument and that he fled with the children shortly afterwards and no one knows where he is. On her return to Walford shortly afterwards, Kat reveals that Alfie is in Spain with their children, running a different bar with a Russian partner, Dimitri, after their old bar lost a fortune. She insists that the two are taking a break from their marriage. Two months later, Hayley Slater (Katie Jarvis) visits Alfie, who is staying in London, and it is revealed that Alfie threw Kat out after Tommy accidentally caused severe burns to Ernie while she was in bed with Dimitri. Hayley reveals that she is pregnant and that Alfie is the father following a drunken one-night stand in Spain. Alfie tries to persuade Hayley to terminate the pregnancy and returns to Spain, but Hayley decides to keep the baby.

Kat gets a video call from Alfie and he asks her to collect something for him. Believing him to still be in Spain, she follows his instructions and goes to a chapel where she is surprised to see Alfie in person. Alfie is running a funeral business and has many clients lined up, but Kat is unimpressed and only sees it as a scam. She is angry that he has not brought their children with him, but apologies for cheating on him with Dimitri. Kat tells him to stop his lies and jokes and she leaves. The following week Kat speaks to Alfie, who is back in Spain, by video call and she is angry when he says he lied to her and actually did bring the children with him to London. Two weeks later, during Hayley's birthday party, Kat answers the door and is shocked to see Alfie standing on the doorstep. Though he reunites with Kat, he is stunned to realise that Hayley did not terminate her pregnancy, and insists they keep the truth hidden from Kat. Hayley develops feelings for him when she sees him bond with their daughter, named Cherry by Alfie after his deceased mother. Jean, who is the only one who has found out about Alfie being Cherry's father, insists that Alfie tell Kat or she will.

Stacey sees Hayley and Alfie kissing and is horrified to uncover Cherry's paternity and issues an ultimatum: one of them leaves, or Kat learns the truth. Hayley decides to go, but her parting gift to Alfie – a lock of Cherry's hair – is discovered by Kat and she works out the truth. After a furious showdown, Alfie turns nasty with Kat, who accuses him of taking advantage of Hayley's vulnerability. Hayley defends Kat and pushes Alfie, causing him to fall down the stairs and knock himself unconscious. Believing that he is dead, Hayley, Kat and Stacey discuss what to do to protect Hayley from going to prison. Kat privately says a tender goodbye to Alfie, kissing him and telling him she loves him. As the police arrive, they discover that Alfie survived and has left, taking Cherry with him. The next day, Alfie meets Phil, who gives him fake passports but warns Alfie to think carefully about his plans. Alfie then listens to a voicemail Kat left him on his phone, pleading with him to bring Cherry back. Alfie eventually contacts Kat and Hayley via video chat and says he will bring Cherry back soon. On New Year's Day, Alfie and Kat meet and Kat tries to talk him into returning Cherry but Alfie admits he cannot bring himself to do it, fearing he would only be granted limited visitation time, and suggests he and Kat adopt Cherry and leave together. Kat tells Alfie she accepts and brings Alfie to the house, claiming it is empty but when Alfie arrives, he is confronted by Stacey, Mo and Jean. Angry and upset, he shows them Ernie's scars caused by Kat's irresponsibility. When Kat takes the children for ice cream, she gives Alfie the option to take them with him on the condition that he brings Cherry back to Hayley. Alfie eventually relents to return Cherry and leave their children with Kat, admitting that he loves her and only wanted her to be happy. The next day, after emotionally attempting to say goodbye to Cherry, Alfie changes his mind and attempts to drive out of Walford with her but finds himself stuck in traffic. This forces him to reevaluate his decision and he turns back and returns Cherry to Hayley. An overjoyed but protective Hayley tells a dejected Alfie that she cannot let him be a part of Cherry's life. After learning of this from Ian, a sympathetic Kat allows him to spend time with their children.

Several days later, Alfie does some DIY work at the Slater house, while Kat resists all his attempts to charm her but eventually relents to an early birthday lunch at The Queen Vic with him, Mo, Stacey, her husband Martin (now James Bye), Jean Slater (Gillian Wright) and Cherry, whom Hayley allows him to bring along for the day. After finding that his credit card has been declined and making a toast to Kat, Alfie receives a phone call from the bank, causing him to rush over to the Beale house where he is staying where he finds overdue bills from running his funeral business. The next day, after Alfie unsuccessfully tries to help Hayley with feeding Cherry her breast milk, the father of a deceased client accuses Alfie of stealing his son's money after a mix-up with the funeral plans, and Ian threatens to kick Alfie out for stealing his food. Under stress, Alfie confesses his troubles to a horrified Kat, including the fact that some of the money was paid for her new fireplace. In order to reimburse the client's family and pay the bills, Alfie decides to look for investors for the business and Ian offers to buy a 50% stake in the business for a loan with 20% interest, which he accepts. Later, after explaining this to a concerned Kat, who reprimands him for his schemes, Alfie and the rest of the Slaters are stunned to find Hayley unconscious from drinking after locking herself in the bathroom with Cherry. Knowing she is struggling being a mother, Alfie suggests to Kat that they adopt Cherry, but Kat is unsure. Soon after, customers of Alfie's funeral business start contacting him and one coming to see him in person, accusing him of swindling them of money. Needing to pay them back, he persuades Phil to lend him 30,000 pounds and offering his expensive car as collateral. Alfie then does a runner and Phil is angry when he takes the money and the car with him. Phil threatens Kat, saying she will pay back the money to him if Alfie does not. When she gets a text from Alfie telling her to look in the wardrobe, she is stunned when the money falls out of it, having left it behind for her. Although the text says he will be returning soon, he does not come back. Kat uses the money to pay for Jean's cancer treatment, leaving her in further debt to Phil. Phil later demands Kat find Alfie but she assures him she does not know where he is.

=== 2022–2026 ===
Alfie returns to Walford in September 2022, on the day that Kat is due to marry Phil, with the goal of winning her back. Kat is outraged by this and sends him away. Whilst driving to his boat, Bert and Ernie sneak into his van and all three end up on Alfie's boat. Kat also goes there once she realises the twins are missing- all are stuck on the boat and she is forced to swim across the river in her wedding dress to get to the ceremony on time; however, she arrives once all the guests have gone home and interrupts a moment between Phil and his ex-wife Sharon Watts (Letitia Dean). Sharon supports Alfie as both Kat and Phil decide to reschedule the wedding and she walks with him into The Queen Vic. Alfie then pulls various schemes to try and win Kat's heart but to no avail and it is only when Linda Carter (Kellie Bright) gives him some home truths that he starts to re-evaluate the situation. Linda offers Alfie a trial shift at the pub and their bond grows even further when he takes Linda's son Ollie Carter (Harry Farr) trick or treating on Halloween. However, Mick is jealous of Alfie and Linda's friendship and sacks him.

Alfie and the boys spend time at Phil's house, where the boys live, whilst Phil is away and play a game where they have to crack the code to Phil's safe. Alfie figures it out but is interrupted by Sam before he can empty it. However, during an encounter with an armed robber, he finds out that Alfie knows the code to Phil's safe and takes £30,000 whilst Alfie is held hostage. A passing Denise Fox (Diane Parish) is able to rescue Alfie and Kat demands that the money be replaced before Phil returns. Alfie enlists the help of Kat's nephew Freddie Slater (Bobby Brazier) to pull various scams to raise the money and ends up selling his boat.

Alfie relentlessly pursues Kat, trying to get back in her and his children's good books. At Christmas, he takes advantage of a fundraising opportunity at Tommy's school by writing and producing Snow White as a pantomime. He insists that Kat take the role of Snow White so that he can be the prince, as both characters kiss in the script. Kat insists that she doesn't want to do this but Alfie ploughs ahead anyway, but this backfires when he ends up kissing Karen Taylor (Lorraine Stanley) instead. When Mick goes missing and is presumed dead, Alfie and Sharon both provide a shoulder for Linda to cry on- Alfie and Linda develop a close friendship although he decides against pursuing a romance with her due to her bereavement and his continued obsession with Kat. Alfie later offers support to another friend when Ian returns to Walford with his ex-wife Cindy Beale (Michelle Collins) who was thought to be dead. Alfie is the only person in Ian's corner and offers a room for the pair to stay at his flat before they return to Ian's house. Alfie later discovers that Freddie had sex with Cindy's daughter, Anna Knight (Molly Rainford) who had been seeing Freddie's best friend Bobby Beale (Clay Milner Russell). Alfie reveals this to Ian who then embarrasses Bobby when he announces this publicly in the Vic, sacking Freddie from his chip shop in the process.

Alfie catches Tommy drinking vodka in the park with his friends and confronts him, resulting in Tommy punching him. This causes Alfie a lot of pain and Phil insists that he goes to the hospital, where Alfie discovers that he has prostate cancer. Phil and Alfie form an unlikely bond as Phil keeps Alfie's diagnosis a secret. Kat wants Alfie to walk her down the aisle on the day of her wedding to Phil but Alfie finds out that Phil slept with Emma Harding (Patsy Kensit) days prior. Alfie punches Phil but agrees to keep his secret. Alfie goes for an operation to remove his prostate and misses the wedding ceremony; he tells everyone he is going to Spain whilst he recovers. Linda escorts him to hospital for his follow-up results following his surgery where he discovers that it was not a success and that there are still cancerous cells in his system. Kat eventually finds out the truth about Alfie's cancer and hugs him whilst Phil watches on.

== Reception ==
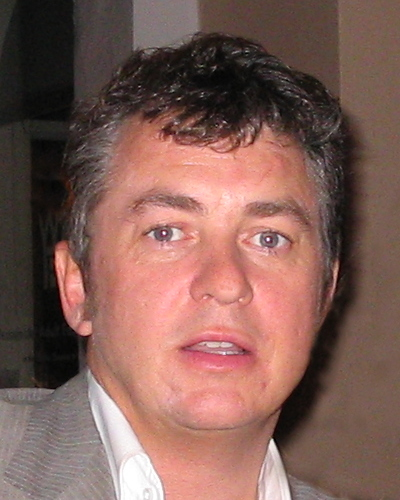
Shane Richie (pictured) has been awarded eleven awards during his time on EastEnders.

Richie has received immediate acclaim for bringing humour to a programme so depressing and has won a number of awards and nominations for his portrayal of Alfie. In the National Television Awards, he won "Most Popular Actor" in 2003, with nominations in 2004 and 2005. He was nominated in the "Best Newcomer" and "Best Comedy Performance" categories at The British Soap Awards in 2003, and won Best Actor in 2004 along with nominations for "Best Comedy Performance" and "Best On-Screen Partnership" (shared with Wallace). He also won "Best Actor" in 2005, and was nominated in 2006, as well as being nominated for "Best Exit" along with Wallace in 2006. He was further nominated in 2011 for "Best Actor". Richie won "Funniest Character", "Sexiest Male" and "Best Newcomer" at the 2003 Inside Soap Awards and Richie, Wallace and Parker won the award for "Best Family". Richie and Wallace won "Best Couple" in the 2004 Inside Soap Awards and Richie, Wallace, Parker and Braid won the accolade for "Best Family" for the second year. He was shortlisted in the "Best Actor" category at the 2012 Inside Soap Awards and was shortlisted for the "Funniest Male" accolade in the 2014 Inside Soap Awards. At the TV Quick Awards, he was awarded "Best Soap Newcomer" in 2003, and "Best Soap Actor" in 2004 and 2005. In 2004, he won a Rose d'Or for "Best Performance in a Soap". In 2020, Sara Wallis and Ian Hyland from The Daily Mirror placed Alfie 13th on their ranked list of the best EastEnders characters of all time, writing that "Some viewers thought it was crazy to cast Shane Richie in a serious drama but, thanks to Alfie's enduring double act with Kat (Jessie Wallace), the former game show host proved them all wrong", although joked that Alfie has a "Terrible taste in shirts". In a 2021 Radio Times poll, Alfie was voted as the eighth best "soap pub landlord", receiving 5% of the votes.
