= List of Kat & Alfie: Redwater characters =

Kat & Alfie: Redwater (also known as Redwater) is a British-Irish drama series that started on RTÉ One on 14 May 2017 and BBC One on 18 May 2017. It is based around two characters from EastEnders, Kat (Jessie Wallace) and Alfie Moon (Shane Richie), who travel to the village of Redwater in Ireland, where the Kelly and Dolan families have lived for generations.

== Cast table ==
Character	Portrayed by
Main
Lance Byrne	Ian McElhinney
Padraig Kelly	Stephen Hogan
Peter Dolan	Stanley Townsend
Andrew Kelly	Peter Campion; Ryan Burke (Young Andrew)
Kieran Harrington	Ian Toner; Anton Giltrap (Young Kieran)
Dermott Dolan	Oisín Stack; Eoin Daly (Young Dermott)
Kathleen Moon	Jessie Wallace
Alfie Moon	Shane Richie
Roisín Kelly	Maria Doyle Kennedy
Agnes Byrne	Fionnula Flanagan
Adeen Kelly	Ebony O'Toole-Acheampong
Bernie Kelly	Susan Ateh
Eileen Harrington	Angeline Ball
Recurring
Iris Dolan	Orla Hannon
Tommy Moon	Henry Proctor
Jonjo Kelly	Ronan Connett
Doug	Alvaro Lucchesi
Jimmy	Mark McKenna
Mouse	Aisli Moran

== Characters' family trees ==
These are the family trees for the characters in Kat & Alfie: Redwater, as understood at the start of the series.

Byrnes, Kellys and Harringtons

- Lance Byrne and Agnes Byrne
  - Roisín Kelly, married to Padraig Kelly
    - Andrew Kelly, married to Bernie Kelly
      - Adeen Kelly
      - Jonjo Kelly
      - Baby on the way (Note: Born in episode 4 and named Lance Padraig Kelly in episode 5)
  - Eileen Harrington, divorced from Sean Harrington (Note: Sean, Harry, Zoe, Michael, Bert and Ernie do not appear in Kat & Alfie: Redwater. Additionally, no reference is made to Michael being Tommy's real father.)
    - Kieran Harrington
    - Aoife "Mouse" Harrington

Dolans

- Agnes's sister
  - Iris Dolan, wife of Peter Dolan
    - Dermott Dolan (Note: Revealed to be Kathleen's son, born Luke, at the end of episode 1)

Moons

- Kathleen Moon and Alfie Moon
  - "Luke", (Note: Revealed to be Dermott Dolan at the end of episode 1) Kathleen's son with Harry Slater
  - Zoe Slater, Kathleen's daughter with Harry, Luke's twin
  - Tommy Moon, Kathleen's son with Michael Moon
  - Bert and Ernie Moon, Kathleen and Alfie's twin sons

== Main characters ==
=== Lance Byrne ===
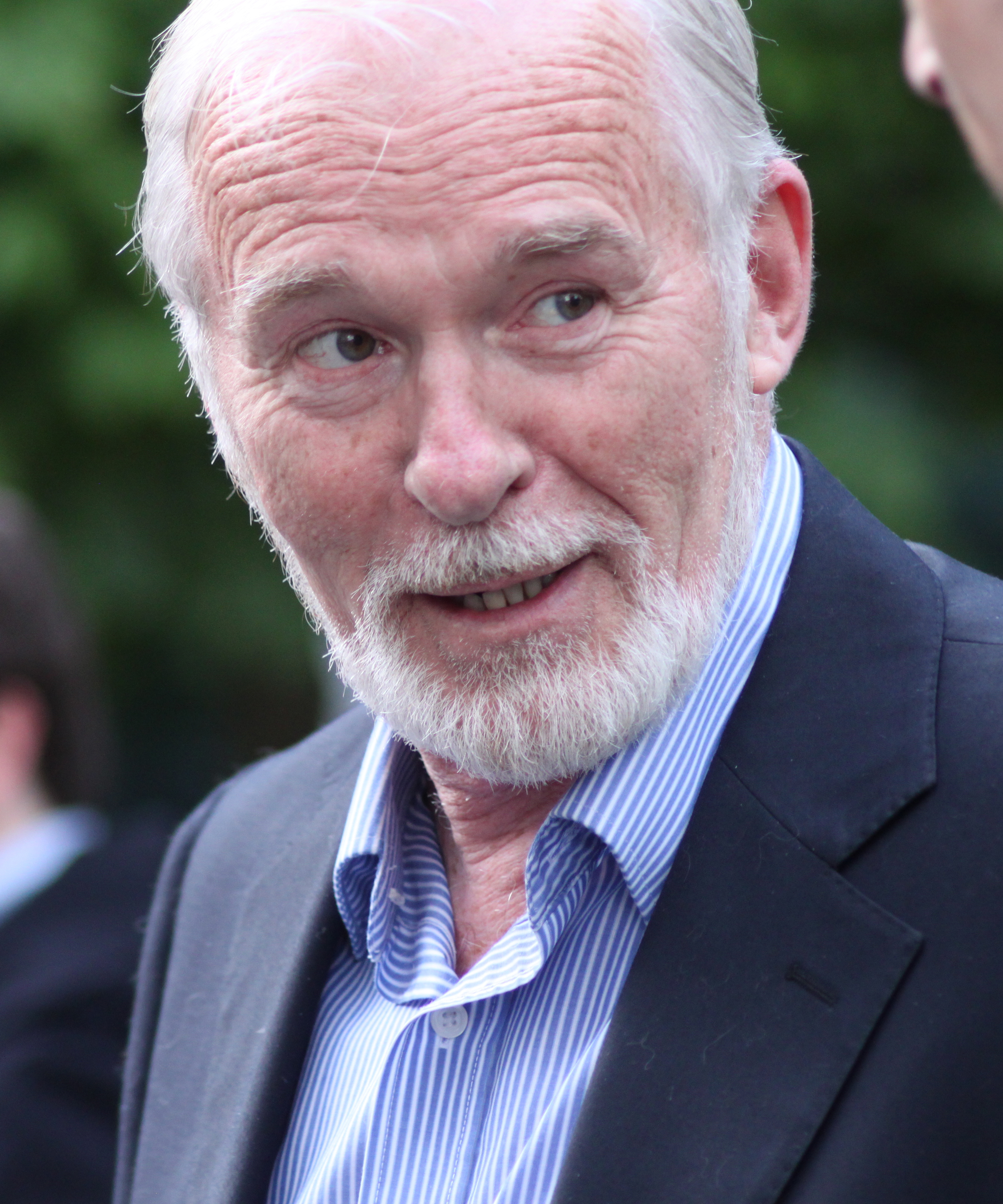
Ian McElhinney (pictured) plays Lance.

Lance Byrne is played by Ian McElhinney. Lance has lived in Redwater all his life. McElhinney described Lance as a "patriarch" but "quite weak" while his wife, Agnes, "rules the roost", and "he's quite happy to be a character in the town with the kind of respect that comes from having been around for quite a while being the 'grand old man' of the village." He enjoys riding his horse, swimming, drinking and "[coming] out with pieces of wisdom". He has empathy towards the Kat and Alfie and is "very happy to embrace them" because he is a "good bloke". Lance has a "special bond" with his great-granddaughter, Adeen, and they get on because Lance is "a bit of a kid" who never grew up, having enjoyed his life being a "lad" despite marrying and having children, and "the kid in him likes the kid in her [Adeen]."

In episode 1, Lance is seen in a flashback, where he rescues a young Dermott, Andrew and Kieran from a boating accident, while he is unable to save Dermott's mother, Iris. In the present day, Lance discovers that Kathleen has come to Redwater to find her son who was adopted 33 years ago. He tells Agnes, and both of them know the identity of Kathleen's son. Agnes tells Lance that they will not give Kathleen any information, and it would ruin everything they had built up. Lance decides to tell Dermott that Peter is not his real father and Iris was in London when she lost her baby and then brought Dermott back as her own, and Peter does not know the truth. Dermott decides to think about this overnight. The next morning. Dermott finds Lance in the sea during his morning swim and gives him a sacramental bread, which Lance eats. Dermott then pushes Lance into the sea and drowns him while praying for his soul and then forgiving him.

=== Padraig Kelly ===
Padraig Kelly is played by Stephen Hogan. He is married to Roisín and is Andrew's father. Maria Doyle Kennedy, who plays Roisín, said that Padraig has an "artistic life" and is not very interested in his wife's farming life. Doyle Kennedy said that they were in love once and had a child very young, and felt that the relationship then was a "youthful, possibly impetuous courtship and decision to marry that maybe hasn't worked out quite the way they thought it would." Roisín stays in her marriage because it is "the thing to do" even though they are mostly irritated by each other and tend to avoid each other.

=== Peter Dolan ===
Peter Dolan is played by Stanley Townsend. He is the landlord of the pub in Redwater.

In episode 1, it is revealed that his wife, Iris, who died in a boating accident, lost a child in London and took Kathleen's child and brought him back to Ireland as her own, and Peter is unaware that Dermott is not his son.

=== Andrew Kelly ===
Andrew Kelly is played by Peter Campion. In flashback, young Andrew is played by Ryan Burke. He is the son of Padraig and Roisín, and is married to Bernie. Doyle Kennedy said that Roisín seems close to Andrew and his own family, but she is "almost overprotective", which may be because of the tragedy that affected the family in the past, and she relies on Andrew. It is revealed in episode 3 that he and his cousin Kieran have feelings for each other as they kiss. They kiss again before Andrew's son's christening but later decide it is not worth the damage. Andrew's last scene appears to show him about to have sex with Kieran.

=== Kieran Harrington ===
Kieran Harrington is played by Ian Toner. In flashback, young Kieran is played by Anton Giltrap.

=== Dermott Dolan ===
Father Dermott Dolan a.k.a. Luke Slater is played by Oisín Stack. In flashback, young Dermott is played by Eoin Daly. In EastEnders episodes broadcast in January 2016, Kathleen discovers she gave birth to a son, Luke, after she passed out during the birth of her daughter Zoe Slater (Michelle Ryan). A nun, Sister Ruth (June Whitfield), explains that Kat's family, fearing that the child would turn out like his paedophile father, Kat's uncle, Harry Slater (Michael Elphick), handed him to the nuns in the convent where he was born. The nuns named him Luke and arranged for him to be adopted into an Irish family. In Redwater's first episode, Dermott is seen in a flashback scene, where he is involved in the Redwater Tragedy that kills his mother, Iris. 21 years later, Kathleen and Alfie arrive in Redwater, where Kat is attempting to find her son. Kathleen quickly befriends Dermott, the local Catholic priest, and Lance. Dermott is angry at being delivered orange juice by the local dairy farm when he has not requested it. After Kathleen confides in Lance that she is searching for her son, he tells his wife, Agnes, this, and they both know the true identity of her son. Agnes insists that nothing is said, but Lance tells Dermott that Iris and Peter are not his parents and that Iris lost her baby while staying in London, so brought back Kathleen's son as her own, and Peter does not know the truth. Lance offers to mediate between Dermott and Kathleen, so Dermott decides to think about it and speak to Lance the next morning. The next day, after finding more orange juice has been delivered, Dermott meets Lance while Lance is swimming in the sea and makes him eat a sacramental wafer and then drowns him in the sea while flashing back to the tragedy, where he lets go of Iris's hand, allowing her to die. Dermott prays for Lance's soul, and then forgives him before leaving the scene.

=== Kathleen Moon ===
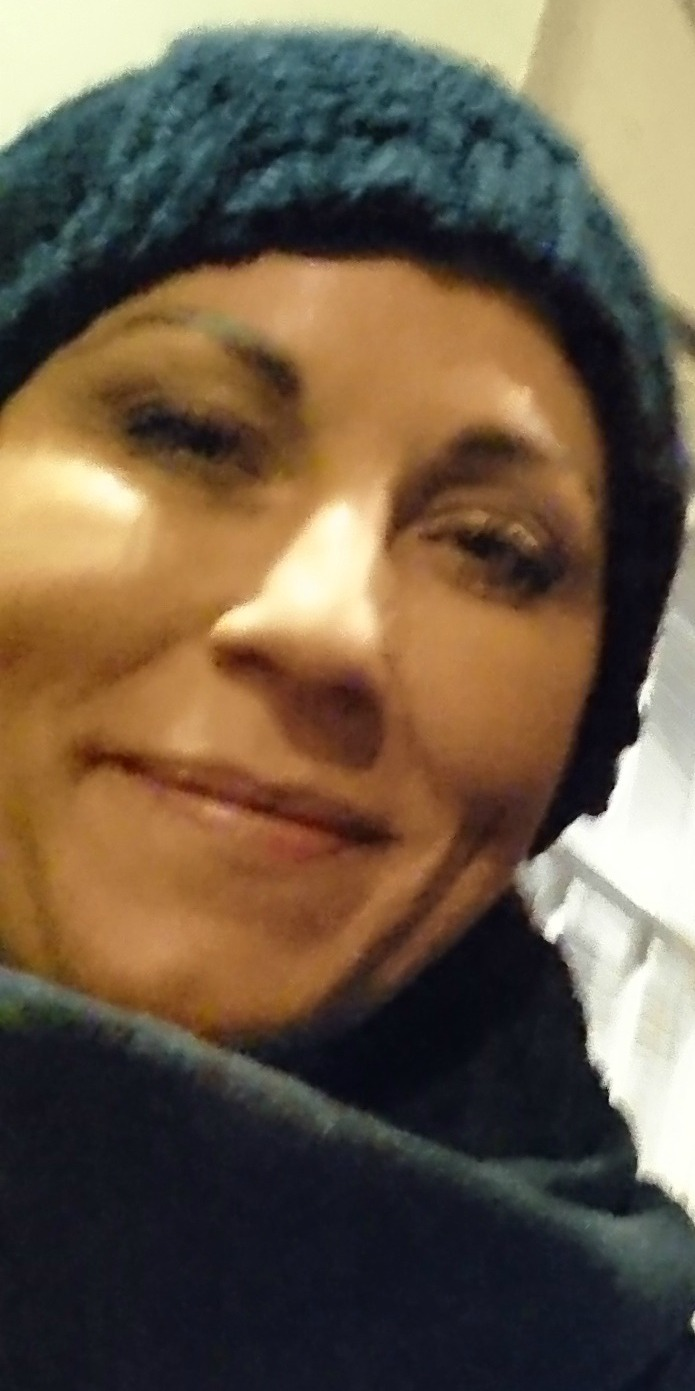
Jessie Wallace (pictured) plays Kathleen Moon.

Kathleen Moon is played by Jessie Wallace. The character originally appeared in the soap opera EastEnders from 2000 to 2005, and 2010 to 2016, in which she is usually called "Kat". The series of Kat and Alfie: Redwater was created because in EastEnders, Kat and her husband Alfie (Shane Richie) had their marriage on track and needed more stories, and Kat had been "going round in a cycle of bad self-worth every few years, all down to the sexual abuse she suffered as a teenager from her Uncle Harry." It was decided that Kat should be shown as a survivor and move on to the next stage of her life, and she was taken back to "Kathleen", the child she was before she was abused. Kat & Alfie: Redwater follows Kat and Alfie as they arrive in the fictional Irish village of Redwater to "search for answers to some very big questions" and put their past behind them. In some of Kat's final EastEnders episodes, she discovers that she gave birth to a son, Luke, after she passed out during the birth of her daughter Zoe Slater (Michelle Ryan); Luke was adopted by a family in Ireland without Kat knowing he existed. Kat's sister Belinda Peacock (Carli Norris) recalls a time the family (minus Kat) went to Redwater and they conclude that Luke must be there. Treadwell-Collins confirmed that "the discovery that Kat has a secret son will [...] ultimately lead to the Moons realising that the answers to so many questions lie across the sea in Ireland." Director Jesper W. Nielsen said the series is "About how one woman's search for a lost child opens Pandora's box; revealing the terrible lies and secrets in the little village of Redwater". Redwater writer Matthew Graham said, "Kathleen Moon is an unwitting bomb in Redwater and creating the debris from her explosive arrival is what drew me to this project." He also said: "Everything [Kathleen] does comes out of the fact she doesn't think much of herself. So, her humour and her in-your-face qualities all come out of a place of insecurity. She doesn't think she's good enough. That's what I use when I'm writing Kat."

Wallace was given a makeover for her part in Redwater, different to how Kat looks in EastEnders. Wallace explained that Kat's different look is because she has "mellowed" since leaving Walford and travelling to Spain, which she described as a "softer side to Kat than we've seen before", but said she still has a "fiery side to her, just not as much as we've seen in EastEnders. Wallace described Kat as a "colourful person" with "a lot of layers to her" and said that after playing her for 16 years "means there's plenty underneath to bring to the surface." She said that Kat wants "peace and to settle down with no more drama in her life." Wallace also said in Redwater she had found another layer to Kat, and the character has become more "Bohemian" though said there are still traces of Kat's "hardness". Wallace performed some of her own stunts in the series, including jumping from a boat into the sea and an underwater sequence. In the series, the character is called "Kathleen" by all characters except Alfie, who calls her "Kat".

=== Alfie Moon ===
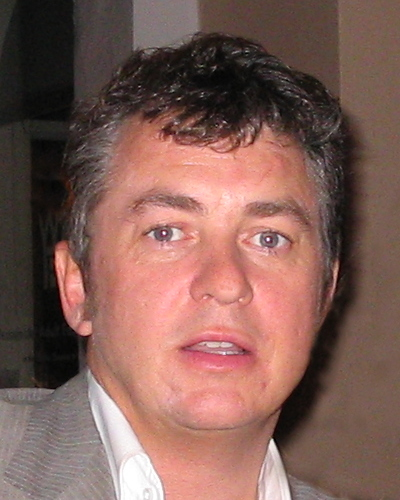
Alfie Moon is played by Shane Richie (pictured).

Alfie Moon is played by Shane Richie. The character originally appeared in the soap opera EastEnders from 2002 to 2005, and 2010 to 2016. Before his departure from EastEnders, he discovers he has a mass on his brain. Richie later said, "For the first time in 15 years, [Alfie] questions himself as a father, a husband and as a life, it feels like it's coming to an end for him. [...] Alfie starts getting hallucinations and one in particular is quite harrowing."

=== Roisín Kelly ===
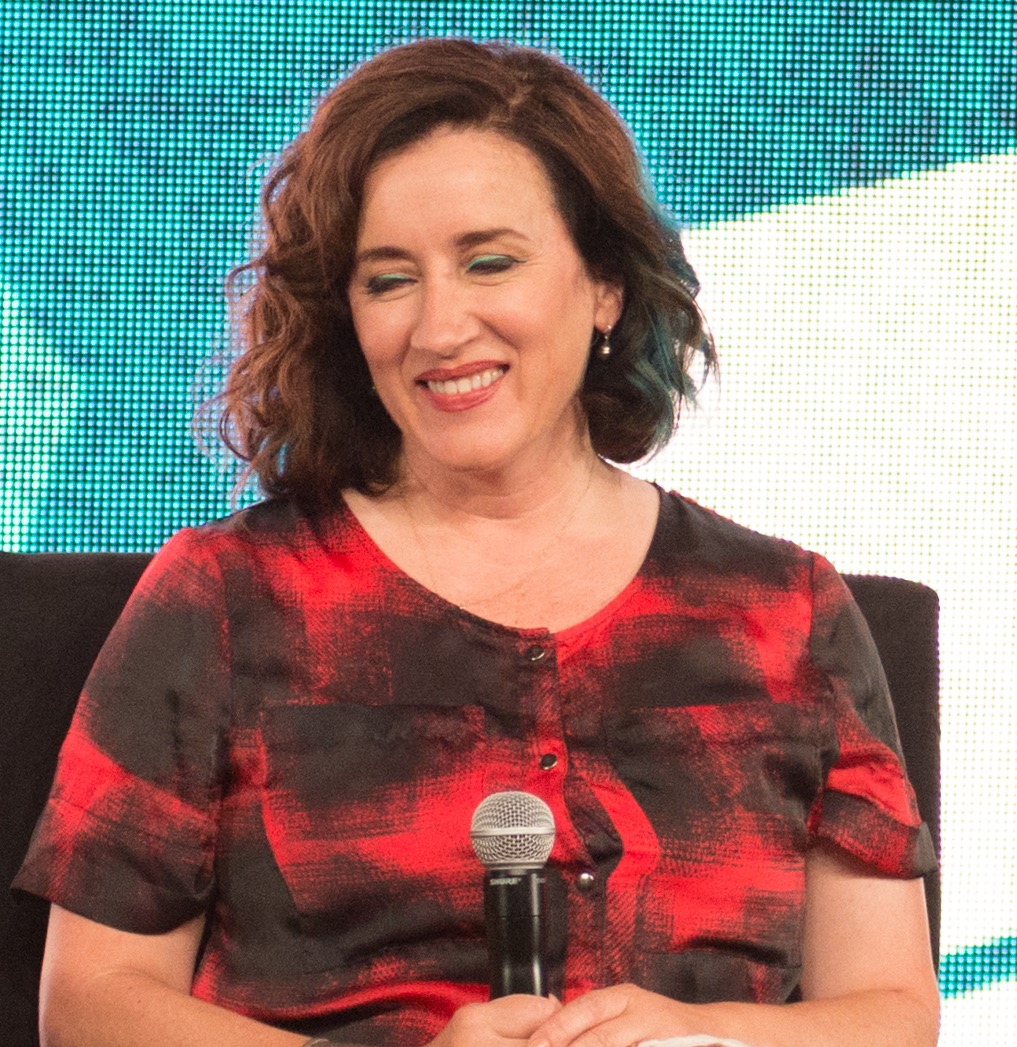
Maria Doyle Kennedy (pictured) plays Roisín Kelly.

Roisín Kelly is played by Maria Doyle Kennedy. She is married to Padraig and is Andrew's mother. She is also daughter of Lance and Agnes and sister to Eileen. Doyle Kennedy described Roisín as "quite complicated", different on the outside to how she is inside, "very practical, very stoic and keeps a lid on most of her dreams and passions as there's not much room for them in her life." She added that Roisín is "quite dutiful" in working on her parents' farm because she has not much time for other things. Of Roisín's relationship with Padraig, Doyle Kennedy said that they were in love once and had a child very young, and felt that the relationship then was a "youthful, possibly impetuous courtship and decision to marry that maybe hasn't worked out quite the way they thought it would." Roisín stays in her marriage because it is "the thing to do" even though they are mostly irritated by each other and tend to avoid each other. Doyle Kennedy said that Roisín's relationship with Eileen is "interesting" and in reality, she and Angeline Ball, who plays her, have been friends for many years. Roisín is resentful of Eileen because Eileen left the farm and Roisín never had the opportunity to do so herself. She said, "They spark off each other in that way that sisters do—they're very sharp, very sarcastic. They're akin to a match and kindling, but there's something strong between them." Ball said Eileen and Roisín's relationship is "strained and competitive" and Eileen could be deeply bitter towards Roisín because Roisín did not suffer a loss and did not have to leave, and called it a "love-hate relationship". Doyle Kennedy said that Roisín seems close to Andrew and his own family, but she is "almost overprotective", which may be because of the tragedy that affected the family in the past. She relies on Andrew more than on Padraig. On Kathleen and Alfie's arrival, Doyle Kennedy said that Roisín is "blasé" about them as "People often come to Redwater on holiday" but sees them as "unusual" and is not suspicious of them.

=== Agnes Byrne ===
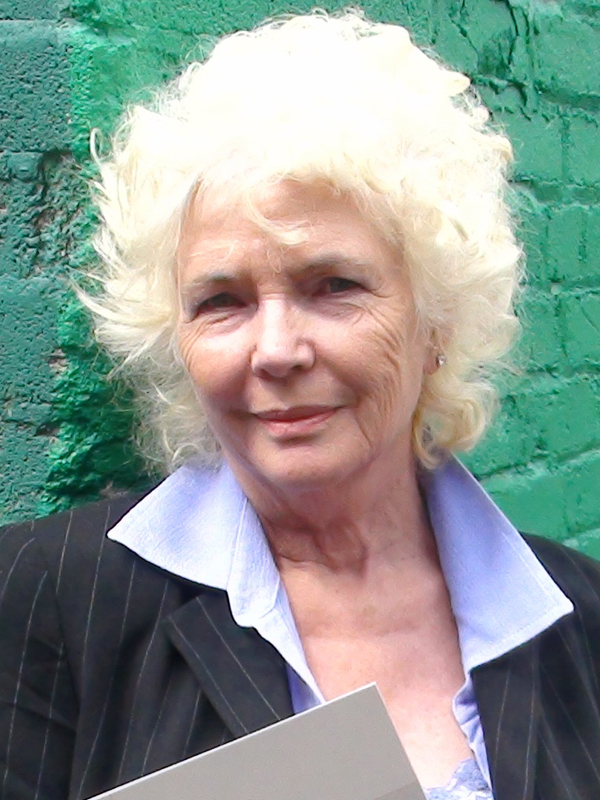
Agnes is played by Fionnula Flanagan (pictured).

Agnes Byrne is played by Fionnula Flanagan. She is married to Lance and is mother to Roisín and Eileen. Flanagan described Agnes as "a fascinating character, full of secrets, deceit and manipulation" and later said she "has all the secrets and [does not] want to tell them. [She] want[s] to get in everybody's way, [she is] so horrible" and explained that Agnes is the matriarch of the family that the Moons get involved with. Flanagan said of Agnes: "I wonder why this woman hasn't been murdered long ago. [...] [H]ow hasn't someone murdered her? I would. She's very manipulative so that's what makes it yummy to play. Who wants to be nice? This is much more interesting."

=== Adeen Kelly ===
Adeen Kelly is played by Ebony O'Toole-Acheampong. Adeen and her great-grandfather, Lance, have a "special bond" because Lance is "a bit of a kid" who never grew up, and Adeen is a "wild child" who is similar to Lance, so "the kid in him likes the kid in her."

=== Bernie Kelly ===
Bernadette "Bernie" Kelly is played by Susan Ateh. She is married to Andrew, and is a local garda. In the show, Bernie is pregnant with her and Andrew's third child. Ateh, who lives in Los Angeles, was told about the part by a friend who saw an advert looking for a mixed race actress. She sent in an audition tape and 10 days later was interviewed over Skype by the director, producers and casting director, and was offered the part a few days later. Ateh described Bernie as "a very strong character".

=== Eileen Harrington ===
Eileen Harrington is played by Angeline Ball. Eileen is a daughter of Lance and Agnes, sister of Roisín and mother of Kieran. Ball said that Eileen "has a kind of dual personality that's not always evident." She called the character "a fighter and a survivor" and explained that she left Redwater 20 years ago, which was "a difficult decision", and moved to the United States with her young son. Although Ball described this as "very brave and courageous", she added that Eileen is "quite fragile" and said that "What you see with Eileen is not what you get. Her exterior is very polished and designer-clad, but there's an underlying sadness about her—I guess a grief and loneliness. She feels a bit like an outsider, having left all those years ago." She called Eileen "a strong woman" as she had to fend for herself. She also said that Eileen like to "show that nothing's a big deal" and "appears not to be a deep thinker". Eileen's return to Redwater makes her "less polished, less 'New York'", and her American accent drops away, as does her "hardened exterior". Eileen left Redwater because of her grief after she lost a child to drowning, and because for independence from her "a very strong mother and sister". Doyle Kennedy said that Roisín's relationship with Eileen is "interesting" and in reality, she and Ball have been friends for many years. Roisín is resentful of Eileen because Eileen left the farm and Roisín never had the opportunity to do so herself. She said, "They spark off each other in that way that sisters do—they're very sharp, very sarcastic. They're akin to a match and kindling, but there's something strong between them." Ball said Eileen and Roisín's relationship is "strained and competitive" and Eileen could be deeply bitter towards Roisín because Roisín did not suffer a loss and did not have to leave. She called it a "love-hate relationship".

== Recurring characters ==
- Iris Dolan (Orla Hannon) – Iris died 21 years previously, along with Mouse, in a boating tragedy, and appears in flashback scenes. In episode 1, it is shown that she drowned after asking her son, Dermott to save her. In episode 5, it is revealed that she was drunk on the boat and before the tragedy, she told Dermott she is not his mother.
- Tommy Moon (Henry Proctor) – Kathleen's son.
- Jonjo Kelly (Ronan Connett) – the second child and first son of Andrew and Bernie. In episode 2, he befriends Tommy at Lance's wake.
- Doug (Alvaro Lucchesi) – Bernie's Garda colleague. Also called Dougie. In episode 2, Bernie asks Doug to take Adeen's mobile phone to the forensics laboratory to analyse photos she took of the scene where Lance died. He is also called away from the station by a fake call by Dermott in order to leave Bernie alone there. He also finds the email that Dermott had deleted and later shows Bernie the surveillance video of Dermott at the station computer.
- Jimmy (Mark McKenna) – appears in episodes 3 and 5.
- Mouse (Aisli Moran) – Eileen's daughter and Kieran's sister Aoife, nicknamed Mouse, who dies in the Redwater Tragedy along with Iris 21 years previously. She appears in flashback scenes in episode 3.

== Other characters ==
- Mr Singh (Shashi Rami) – appears in episode 5
- Pat Donoghue (Áine Ní Mhuirí) – appears in episode 5
