= Mata Hari (TV series) =

2017 Russian-Portuguese television series

- Genre: Biographical
- Written by: Igor Ter-Karapetov; Oleg Kirillov
- Directed by: Dennis Berry; Julius Berg
- Starring: Vahina Giocante; Maksim Matveyev; Aleksei Guskov; Kseniya Rappoport
- Composer: Aleksei Aigi
- Country of origin: Russia; Portugal
- Original languages: Russian, English
- No. of series: 1
- No. of episodes: 12

Production
- Producers: Vlad Riashyn; Aleksandr Starikov
- Cinematography: Oleg Lukichov; Andrei Katorzhenko
- Production company: Star Media

Original release
- Network: SIC; Channel One Russia; Inter
- Release: 20 March – 28 March 2017

Mata Hari is a 2017 Russian television series, produced by International production company Star Media in association with Channel One (Russia) and Inter (Ukraine).

The series is dedicated to the story of the legendary spy, fatal temptress and passionate dancer Margareta Zelle, better known under the pseudonym Mata Hari, who was engaged in espionage activities in favor of Germany during the First World War.

== Plot ==
Margaret MacLeod, persecuted by her ex-husband, is deprived of custody of her daughter and abandoned to the mercy of fate with no means of subsistence. She becomes a dancer and is desperate to find any other earnings.

Under the pseudonym Mata Hari, Margaret becomes the favorite of the European elite. For her the doors of luxurious mansions and villas open, each performance produces an incredible furore. But the First World War is coming, which will forever change the course of history.

And Mata Hari can barely foresee what role she is destined to play in the upcoming events.

== Cast ==
- Vahina Giocante as Mata Hari
- John Corbett as Rudolph MacLeod
- Gérard Depardieu as Father Bernard
- Oisín Stack as Gabriel Astruc
- Alcides Estrella as Cyrus
- Anatoly Lobotsky as Monsieur Mollier
- Viktoriya Isakova as Countess Lydia Kireevskaya
- Nuno Lopes as Baron Maximilian Riddoh
- Chris Murphy as Hubert Surdier, chauffeur of Kireevskaya
- Rade Šerbedžija as industrialist Eugene Émile Étienne Guimet
- Alexander Petrov as Mathieu Niwa, nicknamed "Knife", a thief and a murderer
- Rutger Hauer as Stolbakken, Judge
- Yehezkel Lazarov as Don Jesús Costello, Spanish Count
- Christopher Lambert as Gustav Kramer
- Kseniya Rappoport as Elizabeth Shragmuller
- Carlotto Cotta as Theophile Rastignac
- Maksim Matveyev as Vladimir Maslov, the captain
- Maria Fomina as Vera Semihina
- Aleksei Guskov as Georges Ladoux, the head of the Deuxième Bureau
- Svetlana Khodchenkova as Zlatka Dzhenich
- Alexander Mikhailov as Pyotr Seminikhin
- Makar Zaporizhzhya as ensign Ryabov
- Dmitry Maltsev as Hervé Matine
- Peter Nesterov as Lieutenant Sakhnevich
- Alexander Khoshabaev as Mr Melo
- Ilya Slanevsky as German officer
- Nail Abdrakhmanov as David
- Artem Tsypin as Salinas
- Andrei Tartakov as Sergey Diaghilev
- Danila Dunaev as Pierre Lenoir
- Ruslan Dzhaybekov as André Citroën
- Alexander Ryazantsev as Nikolai Alexandrovich Lokhvitsky, Major-General of the Russian Expeditionary Force
- Natalia Gudkova as Michelle Riva
- Mikhail Dorozhkin as Salbarbe
- Igor Ivanov as Maître Clunet, lawyer
- Mira Amaidas as Patty
- Elena Sever as Tilda
- John Frey as Wernhel
- Ekaterina Rokotova as Beata Purishkevich
- Eugene Sibelco as Victor Hartung
- Ivan Rudakov as Ramon Cortes
- Anna Tsukanova-Cott as Anna
- Joanna Laitao as Non (14 years old)
- Sara Mestre as Non
- Aleksey Zuev as Father Aleksander
- Alexey Sekirin as Mister Munk
- Rogario Samora as Mrs. Patterson
