= Ian McElhinney =

Northern Irish actor and director (born 1948)

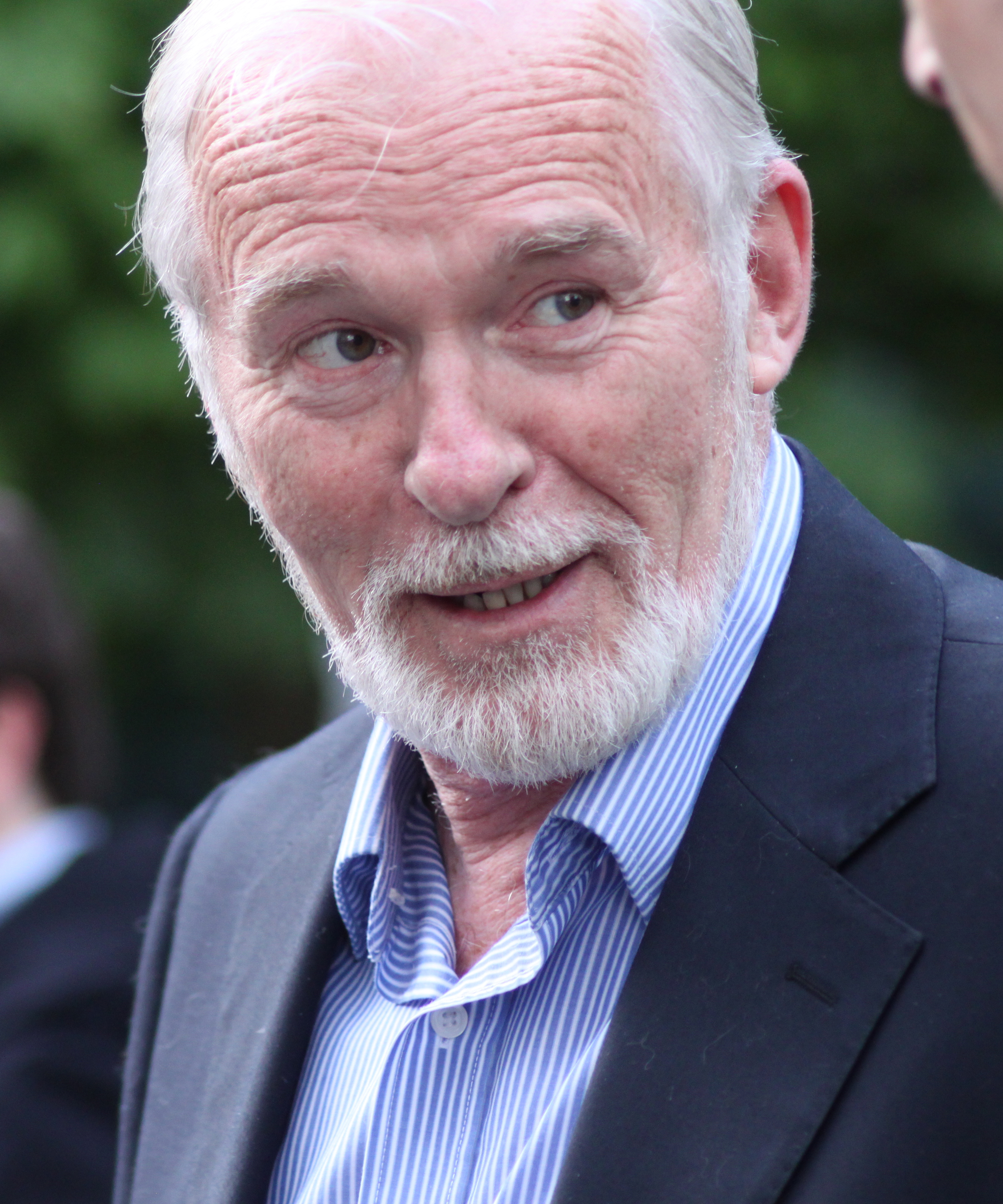
- McElhinney in 2014
- Born: 30 June 1948 (age 78); Belfast, Northern Ireland
- Education: Brandeis University
- Occupations: Actor, director
- Years active: 1981–present
- Spouse: Marie Jones
- Children: 3

Ian McElhinney (born 30 June 1948) is a Northern Irish actor and director. He has appeared in many television series in a career spanning more than forty years; notable appearances include Taggart, Hornblower, Cold Feet, and The Tudors. In recent times, his best known roles are as Barristan Selmy in Game of Thrones, Morgan Monroe in The Fall, and Granda Joe in Derry Girls.

== Early life ==
Ian McElhinney was born on 30 June 1948 in Belfast, the son of a Church of Ireland (Anglican) clergyman and teacher. He studied international affairs at Brandeis University in Waltham, Massachusetts. He worked as a teacher at Goole Grammar School, now Goole Academy, in Yorkshire, England, for several years before becoming an actor. He started acting professionally at the age of 30, playing Bill Sikes in a theatre production of Oliver!.

== Personal life ==
He is married to playwright and actress Marie Jones; in 2009, the couple started their own company, Rathmore Productions Ltd. They live in Belfast and have three sons.

== Filmography ==
=== Film ===
Year	Film	Role	Notes
1982	Angel	Groom	
1983	Acceptable Levels	Andy	
1984	Anne Devlin	Major Sirr	
1985	Lamb	Maguire	
1986	The End of the World Man	Architect	
1987	A Prayer for the Dying	Lodger	
1988	Reefer and the Model	Reefer	
1990	Hidden Agenda	Jack Cunningham	
1990	Fools of Fortune	The Stranger	
1992	The Playboys	Joe Cassidy	
1996	The Boy from Mercury	Brother Dowdall	
1996	Small Faces	Uncle Andrew	
1996	Michael Collins	Belfast Detective	
1996	Hamlet	Barnardo	
1997	This Is the Sea	Da Stokes	
1997	The Boxer	Reggie Bell	
1998	Divorcing Jack	Alfie Stewart	
1999	A Love Divided	Reverend Hamilton	
2000	Borstal Boy	Verreker	
2001	Mapmaker	Sergeant Devlin	
2006	The Front Line	Mikey	
2007	Closing the Ring	Cathal Thomas	
2008	City of Ember	Builder	
2009	A Shine of Rainbows	Father Doyle	
2009	Swansong: Story of Occi Byrne	Skip	
2009	Triage	Ivan	
2010	Leap Year	Priest	
2010	Cup Cake	Rusty Rafferty	
2015	A Patch of Fog	Freddie Clarke	
2016	The Truth Commissioner	James Fenton	
2016	The Journey	Rory McBride	
2016	Rogue One: A Star Wars Story	General Jan Dodonna	
2016	Sacrifice	D.I. McKie	
2017	Bad Day for the Cut	Eamon	
2017	Zoo	Mr. Shawcross	
2022	The Ulysses Project	Mr. Deasy / Barrister JJ Molloy	
2023	The Last Rifleman	Tom Malcolmson	
2023	The Boys in the Boat	Elderly Joe Rantz	

=== Television ===
Year	Film	Role	Notes
1981	Cowboys	Driver	Television film
1982	BBC2 Playhouse	Mousey	Episode: "Potatohead Blues"
1984	After You've Gone	Mike	Television film
1984	Fire at Magilligan	Loyalist Leader	Television film
1984	A Woman Calling	Mr. Burke	Television film
1985	The Price	Priest	Episode #1.6
1985	Ties of Blood	Maj. Watson	Episode: "McCabe's Wall"
1986	Screen Two	Damien / Inspector McBride	Episode: "Shergar"; Episode: "Naming the Names"
1987	Dead Entry	Martin Galbraith	3 episodes
1987	The Rockingham Shoot	John Reilly	Television film
1987	Lapsed Catholics	Derek O'Gorman	Television film
1987	First Sight	Joe	Episode: "The Last of a Dyin' Race"
1987	Brond	Kennedy	3 episodes
1988	Wipe Out	Max Raines	TV miniseries, 5 episodes
1988	The Grasscutter	Brian Devlin	Television film
1989	Streetwise	Denny Moss	Episode: "Home Truths"
1990	Who Bombed Birmingham?	Sinn Fein Leader	Television film
1990	Shoot to Kill	Assistant Chief Constable Trevor Forbes	Television film
1990	The Lilac Bus	Billy	Television film
1990–1991	4 Play	Eddie / McQuire	Episode: "Valentine Falls"; Episode: "In the Border Country"
1991	Children of the North	O'Hare	3 episodes
1992	The Bill	Mickey Felcher	Episode: "Trial and Error"
1992	Screenplay	Reggie Devine	Episode: "You, Me & Marley"
1993	Spender	Flynn	Episode: "Bad Company"
1993	Lovejoy	Cieran Stow	Episode: "Ducking and Diving"
1993	Circle of Deceit	Father Fergel	Television film
1993	Between the Lines	Chief Superintendent Trevor Dunne	Episode: "The Great Detective"
1993	A Woman's Guide to Adultery	Martin	3 episodes
1993	Taggart	Archie Rae / Sean O'Donnell	Episode: "Death Without Dishonour"; Episode: "Cause and Effect"
1994	Blind Justice	Father Malone	Television film
1995	Beyond Reason	Smythe QC	Television film
1995	Hearts and Minds	Alex	4 episodes
1995	Life After Life	Working Out Governor	Television film
1995	Roughnecks		2 episodes
1996	Safe and Sound	Higgins	Episode: "Hope"
1997	Wokenwell	Sergeant Duncan Bonney	6 episodes
1998	Touch and Go	Clive Bevan	Television film
1998	Hornblower: The Examination for Lieutenant	Captain Hammond	Television film
1998–1999	Maisie Raine	C.S. Jack Freeman	12 episodes
1999	Durango	Vestor McCarthy	Television film
1999–2000	Queer as Folk	Clive Jones	2 episodes
2000	Queer as Folk 2	Clive Jones	Television film
2000	In Defence	DCS David Dillne	Episode #1.3
2001	Hornblower: Retribution	Captain Hammond	Television film
2002	No Tears	Padraig McFadden	TV miniseries
2003	Murphy's Law	Fulton	Episode: "Manic Munday"
2003	Holby City	Brian Chapman	Episode: "For Better, for Worse"
2003	Cold Feet	Bill Williams	Season 5
2003	Doctors	Howard Brackley	Episode: "Faking the Dead"
2003	The Clinic	Joseph McGarry	5 episodes
2003	Hornblower: Loyalty	Captain Hammond	Television film
2004	Omagh	Stanley McCombe	Television film
2005	Coronation Street	Father Thomas	5 episodes
2005	Pure Mule	Harry Kilroy	Episode: "Kevin's Weekend"
2007	Rough Diamond	Tim Regan	2 episodes
2007	The Tudors	Pope Clement VII	Episode: "Message to the Emperor"
2007	Casualty	Robert Finch	Episode: "Communion"
2007	Single-Handed	Ex-Garda Sergeant Gerry Driscoll	Episodes: "Home Parts 1 & 2" and "Stolen Child Parts 1 & 2"
2007, 2010	Brilliant!	Principal / Carson	2 episodes
2008	Fairy Tales	Vice-Chancellor Ralph Graham	Episode: "Cinderella"
2008	Clay	Father O'Mahoney	Television film
2008	Last Man Hanging	The Narrator	Television film
2008	Little Dorrit	Mr. Clennam	2 episodes
2008	Raw	Phillip	Episode #1.6
2009	Scapegoat	H.A. McVeigh QC	Television film
2010	New Tricks	Fintan MacEntee	Episode: "Coming Out Ball"
2010	An Old Fashioned Christmas	Sean Bassett	Television film
2010	Three Wise Women	David	Television film
2011	Brendan Smyth: Betrayal of Trust	Abbot Smith	Television film
2011	The Sea	Alfred Blunden	Based on The Sea
2011–2015	Game of Thrones	Ser Barristan Selmy	25 episodes
2012	Titanic: Blood and Steel	Sir Henry Carlton	12 episodes
2012–2014	Ripper Street	Theodore P. Swift	3 episodes
2013	Moonfleet	Reverend Glennie	2 episodes
2013	Wodehouse in Exile	Major Cussen	Television film
2013–2014	The Fall	Morgan Monroe	4 episodes (main cast); Episode: "These Troublesome Disguises" (guest star)
2013–2016	Ripper Street	Theodore Swift	4 episodes
2014	Quirke	Bill Latimer	Episode: "Elegy For April"
2014	Babylon	Maher	Episode: "Hackney Wick"
2016	Rebellion	Edward Butler	5 episodes
2016	Barbarians Rising	Tagus	Episode: "Resistance"
2017	The Frankenstein Chronicles	Dr. Lennox	2 episodes
2017	Redwater	Lance Byrne	3 episodes
2018	Dave Allen At Peace	Priest	Television film
2018	Mrs Wilson	Father Timothy	3 episodes
2018–2019	Krypton	Val-El	20 episodes
2018–2022	Derry Girls	Granda Joe	Main cast
2019	Silent Witness	Pat Walsh	2 episodes
2020	Doctor Who	Ko Sharmus	Episode: "Ascension of the Cybermen"; Episode: "The Timeless Children"
2020	The Deceived	Hugh Callaghan	3 episodes
2020–2022	The Split	Professor Ronnie	Recurring role
2021	Bloodlands	Adam Corry	3 episodes
2021–2024	The Outlaws	John Sr.	12 episodes
2022	Suspicion	Grandad	Episode: "Rooms For Doubt"
2023	Unforgotten	Lord Tony Hume	6 episodes
2023	A Small Light	Johannes Kleiman	8 episodes
2024	High Country	Sam Dryson	8 episodes

=== Radio ===
Date	Title	Role	Author	Director	Station
24 April 2012	The Biggest Issues	Clive Watson	Annie McCartney	Eoin O'Callaghan	BBC Radio 4 Afternoon Drama

=== Web series ===
Year	Show	Role	Notes
2016	Game Grumps	Himself	1 episode
