= Kat & Alfie: Redwater =

British-Irish drama series

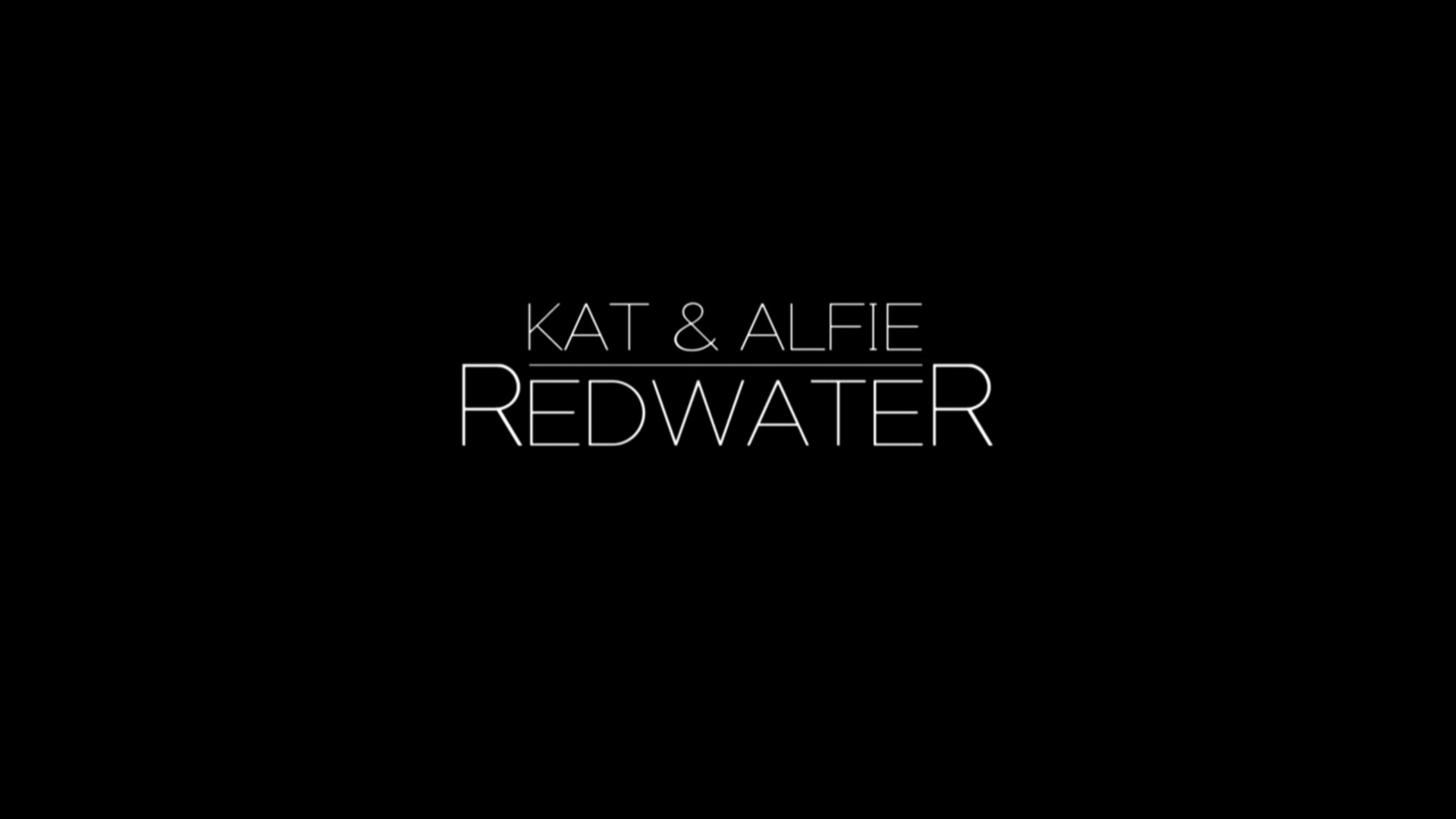
- Also known as: Redwater
- Genre: Drama; Neo-noir
- Created by: Dominic Treadwell-Collins
- Directed by: Jesper W. Nielsen; Karl Neilson
- Starring: Ebony O'Toole-Acheampong; Susan Ateh; Angeline Ball; Peter Campion; Maria Doyle Kennedy; Fionnula Flanagan; Stephen Hogan; Ian McElhinney; Shane Richie; Oisín Stack; Ian Toner; Stanley Townsend; Jessie Wallace
- Composer: Natalie Holt
- Countries of origin: United Kingdom; Ireland
- Original language: English
- No. of series: 1
- No. of episodes: 6

Production
- Executive producers: Christopher Aird; Dominic Treadwell-Collins
- Producer: Victoria Wharton
- Production locations: Killiney; Dalkey; Dunmore East; Passage East; Magheramore beach, Wicklow
- Cinematography: James Mather
- Editors: Celia Haining; Tim Hodges
- Camera setup: Single camera
- Running time: 57–58 minutes
- Production companies: BBC Grafton House Productions; Element Pictures

Original release
- Network: RTÉ One (Ireland); BBC One (United Kingdom)
- Release: 14 May – 18 June 2017

Related
- EastEnders

Kat & Alfie: Redwater (also called Redwater in Ireland), is a neo-noir spin-off of the popular BBC soap opera EastEnders. The British–Irish co-production television series was broadcast on RTÉ One and BBC One in 2017. It was created by Dominic Treadwell-Collins as a six-part series based on the characters Kat Moon, played by Jessie Wallace, and Alfie Moon, played by Shane Richie, from the soap opera EastEnders. The series is set in the fictional Irish village of Redwater, where the residents are hiding a dark secret, and features an ensemble cast. Redwater is a co-production between the BBC and Element Pictures, with Victoria Wharton serving as producer. It was filmed on location in Dublin, County Waterford and County Wicklow between 11 April and 26 July 2016. It started airing in Ireland on 14 May 2017 and the United Kingdom on 18 May 2017. It has also been shown in the United States and Canada. A second series was mooted during filming of the first but in September 2017, it was confirmed that no more episodes would be produced, leaving the fates of the characters unknown. However, Kat's return to EastEnders was confirmed on 20 December 2017, meaning that she had survived the events of Redwater, and EastEnders storylines following her return confirmed that Alfie had also survived and he returned later in the year.

== Premise ==
Kat & Alfie: Redwater follows two characters from EastEnders, Kat Moon (Jessie Wallace) and her husband Alfie Moon (Shane Richie), as they arrive in the fictional Irish village of Redwater to "search for answers to some very big questions" and put their past behind them. Redwater is described as a "very little romantic seaside town", and "a tiny, picturesque Irish harbour village, a quiet rural idyll by the sea where the Kelly and Dolan families have lived for generations." The then executive producer of EastEnders, also executive producer of Redwater, Dominic Treadwell-Collins, said that two events in EastEnders serve as a catalyst for the series. In EastEnders episodes broadcast in April, May and December 2015 and January 2016, Kat and Alfie win the lottery, Alfie discovers he has a mass in his brain and Kat discovers she gave birth to a son, Luke, after she passed out during the birth of her daughter Zoe Slater (Michelle Ryan); Luke was adopted by a family in Ireland without Kat knowing he existed. Kat's sister Belinda Peacock (Carli Norris) recalls a time the family (minus Kat) went to Redwater and they conclude that Luke must be there. Treadwell-Collins confirmed that "the discovery that Kat has a secret son will [...] ultimately lead to the Moons realising that the answers to so many questions lie across the sea in Ireland."

Director Jesper W. Nielsen said the series is "About how one woman's search for a lost child opens Pandora's box; revealing the terrible lies and secrets in the little village of Redwater" and "about how the strong bonds of love in a family can hold everything together, and yet at the same time—destroy everything. It has echoes of a Shakespearean drama, told in a rich cinematic style, loaded with humour and suspense." Editor Celia Haining said that Kat and Alfie "end up becoming entangled with four generations of an Irish family who all have their own mysterious secrets about the past". Richie confirmed that Kat and Alfie's storylines are "part of a large tapestry of other stories that are happening in Redwater." Ian McElhinney, who plays Lance Byrne in the series, described the village of Redwater as a "small community" that is dominated by the Byrne family, who are connected to everyone else. The series also revolves around a family tragedy that happened 21 years previously. Fionnula Flanagan, who plays Agnes Byrne in the series, confirmed that it is about "the suppressed whisperings and shoulder nudges that were for decades a feature of Irish rural life".

Richie said the series was a standalone drama that is "nothing to do with EastEnders except for that it's Kat and Alfie" and "a whole new universe for [them]." He called it a "dark story" that is "quite religious" but with a "charm about it". He compared it to "Broadchurch meets The Wicker Man", while Deadline Hollywood called it a "lighter Broadchurch", as it was expected to "mix the Moons' knack for comedy and turmoil with dark drama". Wallace also compared the series to Under Milk Wood and Philomena. Episode 1 writer Matthew Graham said the series is family-based and character-based, "emotionally real and raw" with "a heightened realism at times". Duncan Lindsay from the Metro confirmed that the series was "no slow burner" as viewers would discover the identity of Kat's son in the first episode, which "contains twists that set the scene for some dark episodes ahead." The series was described as a "rural gothic murder mystery" by the Irish Examiner, who also said that Nielsen's direction "conjures the spirit of Scandi noir". Flanagan described it as Irish noir, or dubh.

== Development ==
=== Conception ===
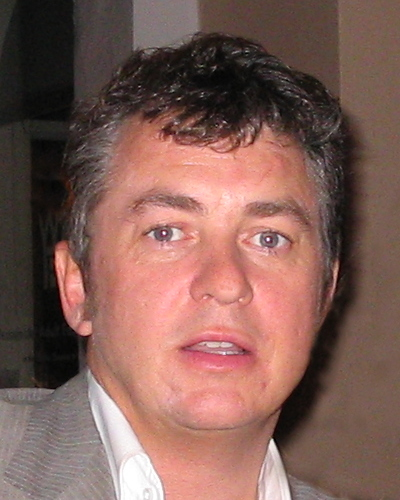
Shane Richie said he was "thrilled" to be in Redwater.

In 2015, Alex Lamb, story producer for EastEnders, pitched a storyline that Kat would discover a son she did not know about, and it was hoped that Kat's search for her son would bring the character "new purpose", but it was felt that Kat's search could not be confined to the setting of Albert Square, and a week of EastEnders episodes set in Spain was considered. Treadwell-Collins pitched the week of episodes to then-Controller of Drama, Ben Stephenson, but they realised that the story would be big enough for its own series and Treadwell-Collins thought that Kat and Alfie "could work in a whole new universe" and that "other characters and their stories could be created around them." Originally the series was to be set in Spain, but Treadwell-Collins thought it was "too obvious" as the series needed to be "fresh, different and to have soul." Treadwell-Collins came up with the idea of setting the series in Ireland when he was on holiday in New Orleans on St Patrick's Day, and he saw people having fun but also claiming to be Irish. Treadwell-Collins realised that Ireland had not been portrayed in mainstream British television since the series Ballykissangel, and the Slater family's (of which Kat is a member) biography in EastEnders states that their origins are in Ireland, and with Wallace, Richie and Treadwell-Collins all having Irish backgrounds, Treadwell-Collins said that "Ireland felt right".

The new series for actors Wallace and Richie was confirmed on 4 April 2015 by Treadwell-Collins. It was announced that the characters of Kat and Alfie would leave EastEnders together, and the series would be set in Ireland. Treadwell-Collins' intention was to create "a new contemporary ensemble drama set in Ireland". Treadwell-Collins called it the "perfect time" for the characters to be taken "out of their comfort zone" and added that his team were "creating a whole new drama that stands apart from EastEnders while taking our style of storytelling to a place of stories, myth, secrets and immeasurable beauty." Charlotte Moore, Controller of BBC One, said: "Life is anything but dull for favourite EastEnders couple Kat and Alfie as they embark on a new life in Ireland in this exciting drama series. Rest assured, their rollercoaster isn't set to end any time soon." Redwater is the first major network drama to derive from EastEnders.

Speaking in reference to the show, Wallace commented, "I have always loved working on EastEnders so when I heard of this new drama to take Kat and Alfie outside of Walford, I couldn't believe our luck. To be exploring the next chapter for Kat as well as working alongside my best mate, Shane, is a dream come true and a huge compliment." Richie said, "Both Jessie and I are absolutely thrilled to be given this amazing opportunity. To have a whole drama focused around Kat and Alfie is a huge honour for us both and we just can't wait to start filming." Treadwell-Collins later spoke again about the new series: "We want to create something big around [Kat and Alfie]. EastEnders as a brand can afford to do it and I've always wanted to do something like that. I'm from Ireland originally, so it's a place I know well. Shane's Irish, Jessie's half Irish—so, there's an Irish connection between all of us. The other important thing about the spin-off show is it's not just about Kat and Alfie—we've created a whole new world and a new lot of characters. The writers have created a really lovely, interesting world, but also with our style of storytelling." EastEnders previously had a storyline set in Ireland in 1997, which was heavily criticised for its unflattering depiction of Irish life, but Richie stated the series would not parody Irish life or "play the dopey card".

The village of Redwater was first namechecked in EastEnders on 21 January 2016. Redwater was announced as the official title on 1 August 2016. 13 April 2017, the title of the series was revealed as Kat & Alfie: Redwater, though it continued to be referred to as Redwater. Treadwell-Collins said that he would not be working on a second series as he had left the BBC but had spoken to producer Victoria Wharton about it and had "[started] putting plans in place about what would happen next. Throughout the series, we have very carefully laid down secrets and hinted at other characters. The end of this series will feel like a midpoint—not an ending. We leave it on the mother of all cliffhangers at the end of episode six." On 14 June 2017, the BBC stated that no decision had yet been made for the series to return. On 20 September 2017, it was officially confirmed that Kat & Alfie: Redwater would not return for a second series, with a BBC spokesperson saying, "In order to increase the range of new original drama on BBC One, Kat & Alfie: Redwater won't be returning."

=== Production ===
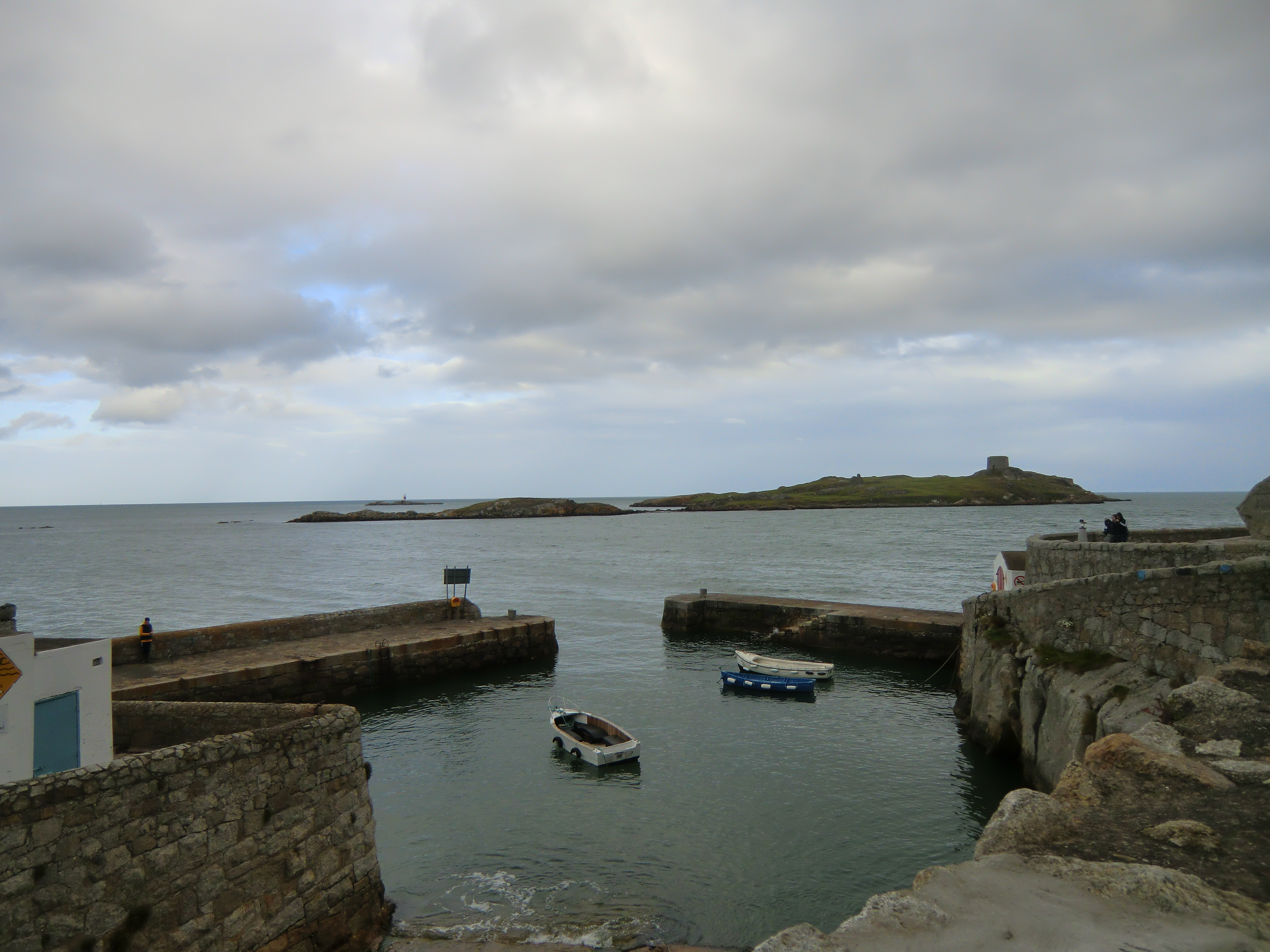
Coliemore Harbour in Dalkey, Ireland, was used as a filming location for Redwater between 5 and 11 May 2016.

Kat & Alfie: Redwater is a co-production between the BBC and RTÉ. Filming was originally due to start in autumn 2015, with the series being broadcast in 2016. Wallace and Richie were to be given time off from EastEnders to film the series, with Treadwell-Collins saying they would be out of EastEnders "for a while". The characters departed from screens on 22 May 2015. However, the series was delayed for unspecified reasons and on 17 October 2015, it was announced that the pair would return to EastEnders, appearing over the Christmas period to set up the storyline that sees Kat discover she has a son and Alfie reveal his tumour. Richie and Wallace first saw the scripts for Redwater on 13 January 2016, and it was confirmed that filming would start after they finished touring with the stage show The Perfect Murder, which was scheduled to run from 2 February until 2 April 2016.

Filming was scheduled to take place in Ireland over a period of three to four months. On 5 April 2016, Treadwell-Collins tweeted the front page of the script from the first episode, confirming that the first read-through was that day, and the episode was written by Matthew Graham. The other writers for the series are Lauren Klee, Matthew Barry (two episodes) and Julie Dixon (two episodes), though Graham oversaw the storylines for the other five episodes. Jesper W. Nielsen (four episodes) and Karl Neilson (two episodes) are the directors and Victoria Wharton is the producer. Graham said he was attracted to the series because he used to be a writer for EastEnders and found Kat and Alfie to be "two of the most dynamic characters to write for", and wanted to "[create] the debris from [Kat's] explosive arrival [in Redwater]".

Filming started near Dublin on 11 April 2016, while the last two scripts were still being produced. Scenes in the setting of St Brendan's Catholic Church were filmed at St Matthias' Church, Killiney, on the first two days. On-location filming also took place in Dalkey's Coliemore Harbour between 5 and 11 May. Six weeks of on-location filming took place in the village of Dunmore East in County Waterford, starting on 25 May 2016. The scripts called for a seaside town or village and out of the options found by the location management team, Dunmore East was chosen. Dunmore East was essentially renamed to Redwater during filming, with the local council and businesses getting involved. Various locations in the village were used, including the beach, church, The Strand Inn and The Spinnaker Bar, with filming at The Strand Inn starting immediately, and interior filming at The Spinnaker Bar lasting three days from 31 May to 2 June 2016. The Strand Inn was used for five separate fictional locations in the series: a tourism office, restaurant, surf shop, sushi bar, and the exterior of the pub, called Peter Dolan's in the series, for which the facade of The Strand Inn was transformed. A country fair, called The Winking Fish, was set up outside The Strand Inn for the purpose of filming. The nearby village of Passage East was also used for filming. Filming ended on 26 July 2016. Wallace filmed some of her own stunts, including jumping from a boat into the sea and an underwater sequence, which were filmed in Dublin. Some filming was also done at Magheramore beach, County Wicklow, including a scene filmed at midnight where mist was created over the sea. The series was filmed with a single camera.

==== Continuity ====
Richie said that as Redwater is a stand-alone series, there is no reference to the EastEnders locations of Walford, Albert Square or The Queen Victoria pub, though Alfie does mention that he once worked in a pub, being the only reference to their time in EastEnders. Kat and Alfie's twin sons, Bert and Ernie Moon, do not appear in Redwater, because Treadwell-Collins knew that having two small children in the series would have "limited Kat and Alfie and they wouldn't have been able to do as much", though revealed that they were originally due to appear, but "suddenly you ended up having storylines about who is looking after the twins and on a show like this we needed to tell other stories" and confirmed that Kat and Alfie have only left them for a few weeks and check on them during the series.

It was announced on 30 April 2017 that EastEnders would make a "subtle reference" to Redwater in May, "in a bid to keep the two shows in the same universe", revealing that Kat and Alfie have arrived in Ireland. The reference was made in the episode shown on 16 May 2017, two days before Redwater's UK premiere, in which Kat's relative, Stacey Fowler (Lacey Turner), receives a postcard from the pair. Redwater viewers noticed a continuity error in relation to this, as the flashback scene at the start of episode 1 is set in 1994, and then the story continues from "21 years later", meaning it takes place in 2015, though Kat and Alfie left EastEnders in 2016 which is when Kat discovered that her son existed, and Stacey received the postcard from Kat in EastEnders in 2017. In Redwater, Kat refers to a postcard concerning her son dated from December 1983, though the EastEnders timeline gives her son's birth as being in February 1984. Additionally, Adam Postans from the Daily Mirror said that the details in EastEnders of how Kat discovers her son is in Redwater were either "forgotten or abandoned" as they are different in Redwater.

=== Music ===
The music for Redwater was scored by Natalie Holt for synthesizers, guitar and a 12-piece string section, and was performed by the London Metropolitan Orchestra, led by Thomas Gould and conducted by Andy Brown. It was then engineered by Toby Hulbert at Air-Edel Studios in London. The theme tune was sung by Úna Palliser. Music from Irish bands, including Pursued by Dogs, Little Green Cars, Kíla and Ham Sandwich, also features in the series.

=== Cast and characters ===
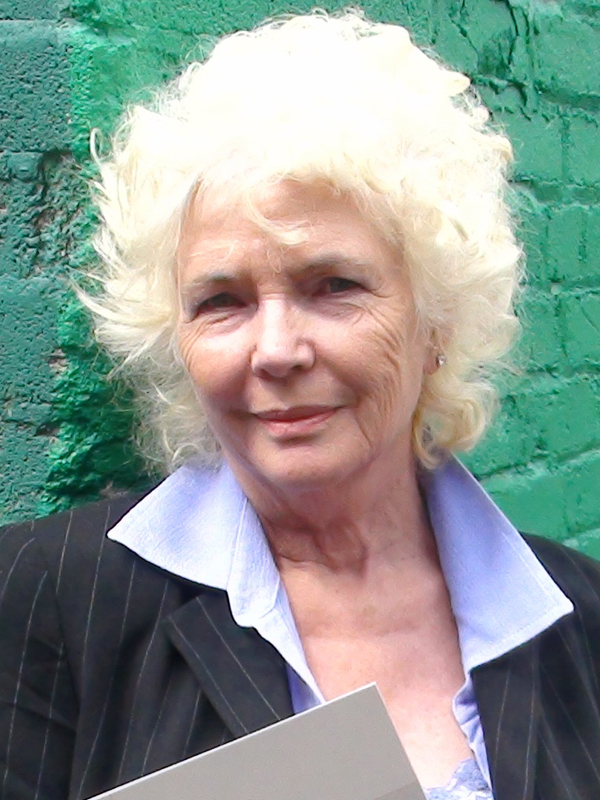
Cast member Fionnula Flanagan said her character is "full of secrets, deceit and manipulation".

Richie and Wallace were confirmed as actors is in the series upon its announcement, playing their EastEnders characters, Kat and Alfie. though in the series, Wallace's character is credited as "Kathleen" and called as such by the majority of characters. Fionnula Flanagan was confirmed to be having a main role in the series on 11 April 2016, when she said her character, named Agnes Byrne, was "full of secrets, deceit and manipulation". The full cast was revealed on 12 April 2016, with their character names officially confirmed by 5 May 2017. The rest of the cast are Maria Doyle Kennedy as Roisín Kelly, Ian McElhinney as Lance Byrne, Angeline Ball as Eileen Harrington, Peter Campion as Andrew Kelly, Stanley Townsend as Peter Dolan, Ebony O'Toole-Acheampong as Adeen Kelly, Oisín Stack as Father Dermott Dolan, Stephen Hogan as Padraig Kelly, Susan Ateh as Bernie Kelly and Ian Toner as Kieran Harrington. Kathleen is described as "a very colourful person" with "a lot of layers to her". Alfie is "a charmer" with "a big heart" who cares about his family. Roisín is described as "quite complicated", different on the outside to how she is inside, "very practical, very stoic" and "quite dutiful". Eileen, Roisín's sister, is described as having a "dual personality", "a fighter and a survivor", yet "quite fragile" with an "underlying sadness". Lance is a family patriarch, but described as "quite weak", while his wife, Agnes, "rules the roost". Additionally, Kat's son Tommy Moon appears in the series, played by Henry Proctor. Ryan Burke, Anton Giltrap and Eoin Daly appear in the series as young Andrew, Kieran and Dermott respectively, and Orla Hannon plays Iris Dolan. Ronan Connett plays Jonjo Kelly. Extras for the series were cast from open auditions held at Waterford Harbour Sailing Club in Dunmore East on 1 April 2016 and The Central Arts on The Quay in Waterford on 2 April 2016.

== Episodes ==
Six hour-long episodes were produced. They started broadcasting from 14 May 2017 on RTÉ One in Ireland, and on 18 May 2017 on BBC One in the United Kingdom. The series was available in the United States on BritBox at the same time as its UK broadcast. The series was broadcast in Canada on VisionTV from 28 June 2017.

A 30-second trailer was released by RTÉ One on 28 April 2017 and another by BBC One on 5 May 2017.

No. in series	Episode title	Directed by	Written by	Original release date	UK airdate	Ireland viewers	UK viewers (millions)
1	"Episode 1"	Jesper W. Nielsen	Matthew Graham	14 May 2017	18 May 2017	495,000	5.49
In summer 1994, a boating accident causes the deaths of Iris and Aoife (known as Mouse). Lance rescues the young Dermott, Andrew and Kieran. 21 years later, Kathleen and Alfie arrive in Redwater as Kathleen believes her son is there, and as soon as she meets Andrew, she believes he is her son. Andrew's grandmother, Agnes, is immediately suspicious of the Moons, and Alfie warns Kathleen to wait for the right time and make friends first, but Kathleen confides in Lance that her son was taken away from her in 1983 and she believes he is in Redwater. Alfie starts having hallucinations because of a tumour on his brain. Alfie then learns of the Redwater Tragedy from Dermott, who is now a Catholic priest. Lance tells Agnes about Kathleen, and Agnes immediately says she should not be told the truth as it would unravel everything they have built. Kathleen asks Andrew about his life, but Lance warns him to give the Moons a wide berth. Tommy gets stranded on a cliff but Alfie helps him up; Alfie gets stuck but Dermott helps him to the top. Kathleen admits to Alfie that she is scared of seeing how disappointed her son would be in her. Lance tells Dermott that Peter and Iris are not his real parents, but Kathleen is his mother; he wanted to tell him the truth but Agnes made sure it was kept secret. It is revealed that Iris lost a baby in London and brought Dermott back as her own, and Peter does not know the truth. Dermott says he will think about things. The next day, Lance goes for his morning swim in the sea, and Adeen takes his horse for a ride without him knowing. Dermott approaches Lance, who says they can work through this together. Dermott offers Lance a sacramental wafer, then drowns him while flashing back to Iris's death, showing Dermott deliberately letting go of Iris's hand, causing her death. He prays for Lance and then forgives him.
2	"Episode 2"	Jesper W. Nielsen	Julie Dixon	21 May 2017	25 May 2017	447,000	3.96
Adeen finds Lance's body, while Dermott enters an empty confessional to confess his crime. Agnes's daughter Eileen and grandson Kieran return to Redwater from the United States for Lance's funeral, and Kathleen quickly realises that Andrew is not her son while talking to Eileen. When Agnes confronts Kathleen, Kathleen explains that she did not know she had a son as she had passed out and he was taken away from her before she regained consciousness. Bernie is suspicious about the circumstances surrounding Lance's death, so has Adeen's mobile phone sent to the forensic's lab to have photos she took of the scene enhanced. Lance's will is read, and Agnes is devastated that he has left everything equally to Roisín and Eileen, and nothing to her. Tommy hears that he has a brother so promises to help Kathleen find him. Tommy goes missing after Lance's funeral, and Roisín tells Kathleen that she saw him at the church. Kathleen and Agnes go there to find Tommy and Dermott praying. Tommy tells Kathleen that he found his brother and Dermott confirms that he is Kathleen's son.
3	"Episode 3"	Karl Neilson	Julie Dixon	28 May 2017	1 June 2017	389,200	3.39
Kathleen and Dermott have bonded, but she lies to him about who his real father is. Dermott worries that Tommy will tell Peter the truth and threatens him. Alfie realises that Kathleen lied to Dermott, which results in an argument; Dermott overhears them arguing about him not knowing the truth and Kathleen refusing to tell him. Agnes burns a wreath on Lance's grave from "W". A barbecue and swim as a memorial to the Redwater Tragedy is held, while Eileen visits Peter, and offers to cook for him. Kieran refuses to swim, so Roisín tells Eileen that he obviously has a fear of water since his sister died in the tragedy. Kieran has a flashback of Mouse, his sister dying in the tragedy when Andrew and Dermott let off a flare and he cries in Eileen's arms. Adeen is suspicious of Andrew and Kieran's closeness and tries to keep them apart; after they indulge in horseplay in the pub's toilet, Kieran kisses his cousin. Eileen and Roisín decide to sell one of Lance's properties to pay debt but Agnes is against it. However, Eileen later interrupts Roisín's meeting with an estate agent and withdraws her consent to sell the property and announces that she will sell her home in the United States and stay in Redwater, which leaves Agnes happy but Roisín frustrated.
4	"Episode 4"	Jesper W. Nielsen	Lauren Klee	4 June 2017	8 June 2017	N/A	Unknown
Eileen wants to turn the old house, Cois Dara, into a cookery school; she wants to stay in Redwater but Kieran is unsure. Agnes urges Kathleen to return to Spain. Roisín realises Eileen likes Peter. Dermott learns that Bernie is looking into something about Lance on Adeen's phone, so he makes a hoax call to get her on her own and blags his way into the garda station, where she goes into labour. Instead of calling for help, Dermott deletes evidence from the computer. He delivers Bernie's son and calls an ambulance when she starts bleeding and passes out. Dermott learns that Agnes said Kathleen should leave, so he confronts Agnes about taking him from his mother, but she says he has a family in her, Kieran and Andrew. Alfie fears he is hallucinating when he sees a dog outside that Dermott stole. Dermott, Andrew and Kieran go out drinking in the woods to celebrate the birth; Kieran says that Eileen wants the Cois Dara project to be family only, excluding Dermott, so Dermott takes Kieran and Andrew to a lake with a rope swing; Kieran ends up falling in and has another flashback to the tragedy and remembers Dermott refusing to save Iris's life. Dermott then rescues Kieran from the lake. Peter meets Roisín at Cois Dara and it is revealed that they had an affair 20 years ago; she wants to revisit it but he says he has changed and leaves. Back home, Kieran tells Andrew what he remembered about Dermott, and that he has lied about trying to call Andrew when Bernie went into labour; Dermott listens in on their conversation. Andrew dismisses Kieran's claims and asks him to stay in Redwater. Dermott leaves the house at dawn and goes to Cois Dara. Padraig wakes and finds Roisín sleeping downstairs. Padraig goes outside for a cigarette and sees smoke from a fire; Dermott is standing next to Cois Dara, which is burning.
5	"Episode 5"	Karl Neilson	Matthew Barry	11 June 2017	15 June 2017	N/A	Unknown
Agnes tells Dermott to keep Kathleen away from the baby's christening, but Dermott says Kathleen has made him feel welcome and invited him to meet his brothers in Spain; Agnes reveals that Dermott has a twin sister. Dermott confronts Kathleen over this, who said she was waiting for the right time and insists there is nothing else that Dermott does not know. Later, Peter asks Dermott why he is moody, so Dermott tells him what Iris did, that Kathleen is his real mother, and that his whole life is a lie. Dermott encourages Peter, a recovering alcoholic, to pour himself a drink. Bernie finally receives copies of the photos from Adeen's phone and sees footprints on the beach. Alfie visits a doctor and has a brain scan, lying to Kathleen about where he is going. Andrew and Kieran end up stranded in the car, and the cousins have sex before they are rescued. Peter misses the christening due to his anger and he starts drinking. Dermott christens the baby Lance Padraig Kelly. Andrew tells Kieran that he took advantage of him. Alfie meets Dermott and tells him his tumour has grown and asks Dermott to baptise him, which he does in the sea. During the party after the christening, Adeen is seen going for a ride with a friend named Jimmy, who had delivered pizza in an earlier episode. Peter drives his car drunk, and later he staggers bleeding from the car which is upturned in a river.
6	"Episode 6"	Jesper W. Nielsen	Matthew Barry	18 June 2017	22 June 2017	N/A	Unknown
Bernie questions Dermott over his whereabouts on the morning Lance died; he says he was in the church and he last saw Lance in the pub the night before. Kieran tells Bernie that he remembers Dermott letting Iris die on the boat and suspects he was involved in the Cois Dara fire. Bernie then asks Kathleen about the last time she saw Lance and Kathleen wonders if Bernie suspects something happened, but Bernie denies this. Padraig finds Adeen crying by the side of the road, and later takes her to get an emergency contraceptive pill because she had sex with her friend Jimmy (Mark McKenna). Afterwards, Adeen tells Padraig she saw Andrew and Kieran together and asks if Andrew is gay, to which Padraig says no. Dermott takes Alfie to the hospital for an operation, where the doctors tell Alfie his recovery could take weeks, so he will be unable to go home as planned. Alfie asks Dermott to find Kathleen and bring her to the hospital. Roisín and Eileen find Peter and bring him home, and Roisín tells Eileen that he is an alcoholic. Peter confronts Agnes over swapping his baby for Dermott, but Agnes says his affair with Roisín caused the baby to die and it is his own fault. She warns him not to reveal the truth, otherwise Eileen will discover that Mouse died because Iris discovered the affair and turned to drink before getting in the boat that fateful night, and therefore Peter and Roisín caused the death of Eileen's daughter. Agnes insists that Dermott is still Peter's son and not to lose him. Peter tells Bernie that Dermott was the last person to see Lance alive as they had arranged to meet that morning. Bernie then sees CCTV footage of Dermott deleting her emails while she was giving birth. Kieran tells Andrew that he does not want to break up his family, so ends their affair and says he will return to New York. However, Andrew later visits Kieran and they kiss. Roisín and Padraig argue about him not making sure there is money in their bank account for the morning, and when he asks why she did not leave him years ago, she says she did. Agnes tells Roisín that because Peter is drinking, Eileen could find out about their affair that resulted in Mouse's death. Agnes asks Roisín to help her send Eileen back to the United States, and shows her a letter from Lance's son in Manchester, asking about the will. Bernie sees Dermott with Kathleen on the beach, and Kathleen tells Dermott that Bernie was asking about him. Dermott sees the garda arriving so takes Kathleen in Peter's boat, saying they will try to find the whale that was recently seen off the coast. Bernie shouts at him to stop and calls the coastguard. Kathleen asks Dermott if he did something to Lance; he accidentally crashes the boat into a rock and Kathleen is thrown into the water and then cut by the propeller. Dermott gets Kathleen out of the sea but there is nobody around to help. Unable to wait for Kathleen, Alfie has his operation. He loses his pulse and the medical staff start to resuscitate.

== Reception ==
=== Critical reception ===
Before the broadcast of the first episode, David Brown from Radio Times said, "Atmospheric, intriguing and with a primetime sheen that seems a world away from soapland, it'll have you hooked from episode one." A writer for What's on TV said, "It's gripping and surprising, has a thoroughbred cast of Irish actors and is more filmic than soap. Worth delving into even if you've never heard of Kat and Alfie." Tom Eames from Digital Spy called the series a "bold move from the BBC" that "looks like a show that is a must-watch whether you're an EastEnders fan or not." Steven Murphy, editor for Inside Soap, urged the magazine's readers to watch Redwater, despite previous soap spin-offs, such as Ricky & Bianca or Coronation Street: Open All Hours, being unmemorable, because "It's mysterious, moody and dramatic—and looks stunning by making the best of its gorgeous Irish location." Fiona Sturges from The Guardian said, "There is—improbable as it sounds—a degree of suspense here, not to say proper acting. The problem is that whenever Kat and Alfie appear—he the well-meaning idiot, she the wounded fishwife—the spell is broken. The BBC is trying to sell this as Broadchurch meets The Wicker Man, but the reality is more NCSI: Ballykissangel. I love Kat and Alfie, but the quicker they get back to Albert Square, the better." Sean O'Grady from The Independent said, "it's an un-soapy, unclaustrophobic sort of production, and a storyline about a long-lost son adds the necessary emotional stress."

After the first episode was shown in Ireland, Peter Crawley from The Irish Times said that Redwater "looks like a very British idea of Ireland" that is full of "Irish clichés". He opined that Dermott was "the show's most unlikely character", calling him "a 33-year-old bearded hipster priest [...] who accessorises his collar with a hoodie and a donkey jacket [and] flies into a rage at the sight of orange juice". He concluded, "it is hard to decide whether Redwater is a silly show redeemed by its seriousness, or a serious show alleviated by its silliness. It is a peculiar crossover, somewhere between Britain and Ireland, soap and drama; but, so far, it is neither here nor there." Keeley Ryan from Belfast Live reported that the episode received a mixed reaction in Ireland, based on tweets from viewers. Harry Guerin, writing for RTÉ.ie, said, "the first episode suggested that the clichés won't pile up" and "when Redwater focused on being a thriller (both whoisit and whodunit) there was much to savour—excellent performances, a swirling mist of grief and guilt, an eerily relevant story about forced adoptions, and the growing sense that the just-arrived wideboy and girl from Walford are waaay out of their depth." He said that the episode's ending was "more season finale than 'until next week' and the only major 'ah here' from the writers—the same outcome could have been delivered far more convincingly with a bit of narrative restraint." The episode was criticised by Irish viewers for depicting Irish stereotypes such as drinking Guinness and whisky chasers in pubs, and the Irish cast were accused of putting on "over-the-top" Irish accents. Oisin Stack defended the show, saying, "It's a psychological thriller that's meant to have a sense of suspense. Everything is meant to be heightened. I think if people are giving out about the realism, they're missing the point of the genre. It's meant to be stylised and filled with dramatic suspense."

Daniel Kilkelly (Digital Spy) called the first episode "atmospheric" and "gripping". He said, "While Kat shines in Redwater, it's fair to say that Alfie seems a little bit lost and directionless in the first episode, with even scenes of him experiencing weird visions and nearly dying (twice!) seeming like time-fillers." He said the characters of Agnes and Dermott had "immediately caught our attention" but wondered if the show would appeal to viewers who are not EastEnders fans, saying "surely you have to be an EastEnders watcher to really care about Kat's quest for her son?" but said "for us it's a thumbs up if Redwater can keep up the suspense, surprises, gothic tone and sense of foreboding that sets it apart from EastEnders." The series was reviewed on BBC Radio 5 Live's Afternoon Edition, where TV critic Emma Bullimore from TV Times said that it was "enjoyable" but more "soapy" and less "complex" than Broadchurch, and said that viewers should not expect it to be like EastEnders or Broadchurch but should "accept it as a new thing", adding that it had good production values and deemed it a "worthy experiment". Sinéad Garvan from Newsbeat, speaking at the same time, said that she found it "weird" seeing Kat and Alfie in a different setting and was more intrigued by the new characters but said that Kat and Alfie still had the same chemistry that they have in EastEnders.

Following episode 6, which ended on multiple cliffhangers, Sophie Dainty from Digital Spy said that it was "undoubtedly everything the show had originally promised it would be—dark, gripping, enchanting and excellently written" but it "offered very few answers for the fans who had committed six hours of their lives to this". Dainty and Duncan Lindsay from the Metro both hoped for a second series.

=== Ratings ===
In the United Kingdom, the second episode was scheduled against ITV's Emmerdale for 30 minutes, and was watched during its BBC One broadcast on the night by 2.7 million viewers. This was a reduction from the previous week (4.19 million). Sophie Dainty (Digital Spy) said this could have been because of its clash with Emmerdale, as they were not scheduled against each other the previous week. However, while episode 1 received similar viewership to that of the preceding episode of EastEnders, the episode of EastEnders that preceded episode 2 of Redwater was watched by 5.1 million viewers on the night of broadcast, meaning that many EastEnders viewers did not stay tuned to BBC One to watch its spin-off. Dainty said, "This is bound to raise questions of whether Redwater is in the wrong slot going up against Emmerdale, given that the clash is bound to leave soap fans with divided loyalties over which one to watch live".

In Ireland, the first episode was watched overnight by 495,000 viewers. Episode two saw a drop in viewers to 447,000 viewers, while episode three saw a significant drop to 389,200 viewers. Between episodes one and three, Redwater lost 7% of the Irish audience share. Aoife Kelly of the Irish Independent noted that the return of The Sunday Game on RTÉ2, airing in the same slot as Redwater, may have impacted its ratings. At the conclusion of the series, critic Peter Crawley observed that ratings had decreased since the beginning of the series in both Britain and Ireland.

=== Awards and nominations ===
In May 2017, Kat & Alfie: Redwater was longlisted in the Best New Drama category of the TV Choice Awards, but did not reach the viewer-voted shortlist.

== Home media ==
The series was released on DVD by 2entertain in the United Kingdom on 26 June 2017. As of March 2021 is available in the United States on the BritBox streaming service.

== See also ==
- List of EastEnders television spin-offs
- List of television programmes broadcast by the BBC
- List of television spin-offs
