= Oisín Stack =

Irish actor

- Born: 1981 or 1982 (age 43–44)
- Occupation: Actor

Oisín Stack is an Irish actor. He played Kat Moon's long-lost son, Dermott Dolan, in the EastEnders spin-off series Kat and Alfie: Redwater and Elliot in Absentia.

== Early life ==
Stack was born to an Irish father and French mother, and was brought up by his mother in Arklow, County Wicklow, Ireland. At the age of 11, they moved to Bordeaux, France and 18 months later they moved to Chichester, England. Stack decided he wanted to be an actor at an early age but drama school in the United Kingdom was too expensive, so he auditioned for French drama schools and got a place at the Paris Conservatoire.

== Career ==
Stack's early acting career was based mainly in France, Spain and Chile. He appeared in the French crime comedy film The Family in 2013, and the 2014 remake of Rosemary's Baby, as well as a Russian production, Mata Hari. Stack signed up to a UK-Irish agent and a few months later, in March 2016, he was cast as Dermott Dolan in the EastEnders spin-off series Kat & Alfie: Redwater, two weeks before he started filming. This was Stack's first Irish television role and his first "villain" role, as he usually plays "romantic" or "best friend" roles.

== Filmography ==
Key
†	Denotes film or TV productions that have not yet been released

=== Films ===
List of film credits
Year	Title	Role	Notes
2009	King Guillaume	English Student	
2013	The Family	Henri	
2015	The Proposal	Ben	Short
2018	Blood Out of a Stone	Michael	Short
2020	Zanka Contact	Gibson	
2021	Eight for Silver	Dr. Bernard	
2021	Dangerous Creation	Nathaniel	
TBA	Since I Left You †	Ethan	Post-production

=== Television ===
List of television appearances
Year	Title	Role	Notes
2010	Ce Jour Là, Tout a Changé	Groom hôtel Hyde Park	TV series; 1 episode
2012	Interpol	Duncan	TV series; 1 episode
2014	Rosemary's Baby	Dr Bernard	TV mini series; 1 episode
2014	Resistance	Arthur Finnvack	TV mini series; 2 episodes
2014	Détectives	Béranger Heymans	TV series; 1 episode
2014	Un village français	Robert	TV series; 2 episodes
2016–2017	Mata Hari	Gabriel Astruc	TV series; 8 episodes
2017	Kat & Alfie: Redwater	Dermott Dolan	TV series; 6 episodes
2020	Absentia	Elliot	TV series; 4 episodes
2021	Missions	John	TV series; 2 episodes
