= Sawalha =

Sawalha is an Arabic surname. Notable people with the surname include:

- Julia Sawalha (born 1968), English actress
- Nabil Sawalha (born 1941), Jordanian comedian
- Nadia Sawalha (born 1964), English actress and television presenter
- Nadim Sawalha (born 1935), Jordanian-British actor
- Woroud Sawalha (born 1991), Palestinian middle distance runner
