= Accidents Will Happen =

Accidents Will Happen may refer to:

- "Accidents Will Happen" (song), a song by Elvis Costello
- "Accidents Will Happen", a song by Bing Crosby from the 1950 film Mr. Music
- Accidents Will Happen (film), 1938 film
- "Accidents Will Happen" (Degrassi: The Next Generation)
- "Accidents Will Happen" (SpongeBob SquarePants), a television episode
- ”Accidents Will Happen”, a Thomas & Friends song

== See also ==
- Accidents Can Happen, a British television series
- Accidents Happen, a 2009 Australian film
