= Phil Mitchell =

Fictional character from EastEnders

- EastEnders character
- Steve McFadden as Phil Mitchell (2024)
- Portrayed by: Steve McFadden; Daniel Delaney (2022, 2025 flashbacks)
- Duration: 1990–2003, 2005–present
- First appearance: Episode 526; 20 February 1990
- Introduced by: Michael Ferguson (1990); John Yorke (2005); Kate Harwood (2005)
- Book appearances: Blood Ties: The Life and Loves of Grant Mitchell (1998)
- Spin-off appearances: Dimensions in Time (1993); The Mitchells – Naked Truths (1998); Marsden's Video Diaries (2010); Last Tango in Walford (2010); EastEnders: E20 (2011); Phil on Remand (2012)
In-universe information
- Occupation: Mechanic; Barman; Pub landlord; Businessman; Career criminal; Café owner; Nightclub owner; Gym owner
- Family: Mitchell
- Father: Eric Mitchell
- Mother: Peggy Mitchell
- Stepfather: Frank Butcher; Archie Mitchell
- Brothers: Grant Mitchell
- Sisters: Sam Mitchell
- Wife: Nadia Borovac (1993–1994); Kathy Beale (1995–1999); Kate Morton (2003–2005); Sharon Rickman (2014–2020); Kat Slater (2023–2025)
- Sons: Ben Mitchell; Raymond Fox; Albie Watts
- Daughters: Louise Mitchell
- Adoptive sons: Dennis Rickman Jnr
- Stepsons: Ian Beale; Tommy Moon; Bert Moon; Ernie Moon
- Stepdaughters: Zoe Slater
- Granddaughters: Lexi Pearce; Peggy Mitchell Jnr
- Uncles: Archie Mitchell; Clive Mitchell
- Aunts: Aunt Sal
- Nephews: Mark Fowler Jnr; Ricky Branning
- Nieces: Courtney Mitchell
- First cousins: Ronnie Mitchell; Roxy Mitchell; Lenny Martin; Loretta Martin
- Other relatives: Stevie Mitchell; Teddy Mitchell; Harry Mitchell; Barney Mitchell (adoptive); Charlie Mitchell; Jamie Mitchell; Billy Mitchell; Lola Pearce; Janet Mitchell; Will Mitchell; Danielle Jones; James Branning; Matthew Mitchell-Cotton; Amy Mitchell; Charli Slater

Phil Mitchell is a fictional character from the BBC soap opera EastEnders, played by Steve McFadden. He was introduced on 20 February 1990 and was followed by his brother, Grant (Ross Kemp), sister, Sam (Danniella Westbrook/Kim Medcalf) and mother, Peggy Mitchell (Jo Warne/Barbara Windsor). Phil was one of the major characters introduced by executive producer Michael Ferguson, who wanted to bring in some macho male leads. Phil and his brother Grant became popularly known as the Mitchell brothers in the British media, with Phil initially portrayed as the more level-headed of the two thugs. Storylines featuring the Mitchell family dominated the soap opera throughout the 1990s, with Phil serving as one of the show's central characters and protagonists since the 1990s. McFadden temporarily left the series in late 2003, then returned in April 2005 for a brief appearance before making a permanent return in October 2005, and has now overtaken Dot Cotton (June Brown) as the second-longest-serving character in EastEnders – surpassed only by original character Ian Beale (Adam Woodyatt). A teenage version of Phil, played by Daniel Delaney, appeared in a flashback episode broadcast in 2022, which focuses on the Mitchell family in the 1970s, as well as in two other flashbacks in 2025; first in February before the show's 40th anniversary and again in December for a special episode revolving around the dementia of his old friend Nigel Bates (Paul Bradley).

Phil's most prominent storylines include his battles with alcoholism and addiction; suffering from cirrhosis of the liver; various criminal dealings; having an affair with Grant's ex-wife, Sharon Watts (Letitia Dean)—a storyline popularly dubbed "Sharongate"; a failed marriage to Kathy Beale (Gillian Taylforth); a longstanding animosity with his tormented stepson Ian; sparking numerous feuds and rivalries; having relationship problems; seeking to avenge the death of Sharon's adoptive brother and later husband, Dennis Rickman (Nigel Harman), by confronting his gangland killer, Johnny Allen (Billy Murray), in the "Get Johnny Week" storyline; becoming a prime suspect in the murder of his uncle/stepfather, Archie Mitchell (Larry Lamb) (see "Who Killed Archie?"); developing an addiction to crack cocaine that sparks the events of The Queen Vic Fire Week; his struggle to bond with his children Ben (Max Bowden) and Louise Mitchell (Tilly Keeper); a tempestuous relationship with Shirley Carter (Linda Henry), which ends when Phil covers up her best friend Heather Trott's (Cheryl Fergison) murder after Ben kills her; discovering that his wife Sharon had a tryst with and supposedly fallen pregnant by his daughter Louise's fiancé, Keanu Taylor (Danny Walters); the culmination of his feud with Keanu sparking the 35th anniversary episodes that sees Phil's adopted son, Dennis Rickman (Bleu Landau), die in a boat crash partly caused by Phil and Keanu's fight; marrying Kat Slater (Jessie Wallace); assisting The Six in concealing their involvement in Keanu's murder; and suffering from loneliness and psychotic depression, which leads to a suicide attempt during the show's 40th anniversary episodes; and caring for Nigel amid his battle with dementia. Phil has been a father figure to several characters on the show taking several under his wing including Ricky Butcher (Sid Owen), his relative Jamie (Jack Ryder), Jay Brown (Jamie Borthwick), and his stepsons Dennis and Tommy Moon (Sonny Kendall).

One of the most culturally significant storylines featuring the character aired in 2001 and was dubbed "Who Shot Phil?". The events saw Phil shot in a whodunit mystery, with the assailant eventually revealed to be his former girlfriend and Louise's mother, Lisa Fowler (Lucy Benjamin). The "Who Shot Phil?" storyline captured viewer and media interest and the culprit-reveal episode was watched by 23 million viewers.

== Creation ==
In late 1989, EastEnders acquired a new executive producer, Michael Ferguson, who took over from Mike Gibbon. Ferguson had previously been a producer on ITV's The Bill which seemed to be challenging EastEnders in providing a realistic vision of modern life in London. Due to his success on The Bill, Peter Cregeen, the Head of Series at the BBC, poached Ferguson to become the next executive producer of EastEnders.

For the roles of Phil and Grant Mitchell many actors were screen-tested together. This was done to assure the chosen actors – who would work together – had a strong rapport and physical resemblance. Producer Corinne Hollingworth commented: "There were some good actors we had to turn down because we couldn't find the 'right' brother." Steve McFadden, an actor who had worked extensively in television, was cast as Phil. His shape, skills in stage fighting, and a variety of sports including boxing, football and karate made him an ideal choice to play one of Walford's latest "tough-men". Ross Kemp got the role of Grant. Both actors worked well together and shared similar physical characteristics, such as short cropped hair and a "round, open face" – facial characteristics also shared by Danniella Westbrook, who was chosen to play their younger sister, Sam because of this.

=== Personality ===
Initially, Phil was calmer than Grant but both brothers had a sense of physical danger, displaying stereotypical masculinity, thuggish behaviour and a tendency to resolve problems through violence. Phil was originally depicted as the thinker and the more streetwise of the pair, often bailing his more spontaneous brother out of trouble, although later plotlines drove the character down a darker, more destructive route. Phil can be very violent, but unlike Grant, he occasionally showed restraint when dealing with various enemies encountered – exacting revenge over time, using mind games or getting others to do his dirty work, amongst other things.

Phil has occasionally shown sadistic traits. His bullying of Ian Beale (Adam Woodyatt) is often done as a means of deriving pleasure. Equally the ceaseless degradation of Lisa showed a particularly malicious side to the character. While Phil has shown compassion to the women in his life, he frequently finds he is unable to give them the emotional security needed to sustain the relationship. Several women have left him due to this and his inability to put their needs before the needs of his family.

== Character development and impact ==
The Mitchell brothers became two of the soap's popular characters and storylines involving them began to dominate the programme. Their arrival started a new era for the soap, coinciding with the beginning of a new decade – during the 1980s, EastEnders was dominated by the Watts family. His numerous marriages and relationships among the square has had lasting impacts on other characters, and family ties with others through his four biological children and as a stepfather.

=== Sharongate ===
One of the most notable and popular early storylines involving Phil was a love triangle between him, his brother and his brother's wife Sharon Watts (Letitia Dean). Despite the fact that Sharon was married to Grant, EastEnders writer Tony Jordan revealed in The Mitchells – The Full Story that the love-triangle storyline had been planned since Phil and Grant's introduction, after the writers decided Sharon was perfect for them both. This storyline was slow burning and spread over several years, providing a plethora of dramatic tension along the way. The episode in which Phil betrayed his brother with Sharon occurred in September 1992 in one of the soap's notorious three-handers. Things finally came to a head in 1994 with some of EastEnders most popular and renowned episodes, which were dubbed "Sharongate" – centred around Grant's discovery of the affair and his reaction. The repercussions of Phil's betrayal contributed to many subsequent storylines involving the Mitchell brothers during the 1990s. Sharongate has also proven a popular storyline with viewers and it was voted the sixth top soap opera moment of the decade in a poll of 17,000 people for What's on TV magazine in 2003.

=== Alcoholism ===
Among the many issues Phil has been used to cover is alcoholism and the consequences the condition has upon the sufferer's life. The relationship between alcohol abuse and domestic violence was explored between Phil and his wife, Kathy Beale (Gillian Taylforth) culminating in the slow deterioration of their marriage, which gripped viewers throughout 1997. Of particular note is an episode where Phil attends Alcoholics Anonymous (February 1997), an "alien and uncomfortable arena" where he was forced to talk about his condition, expose his vulnerability and reveal the basis of his problem – the physical abuse he'd received from his father and his fear that he will do the same. Writer Jacquetta May, who once played Rachel Kominski in the show, evaluated the episode in an article about social realism, education and the moral messages within EastEnders storylines, commenting: "The episode blames his destructiveness on the 'male' response to self-hate: violence. It says that unless problems are worked through (the female method), they will be repeated generation after generation". This particular episode has also been used in a study by the Stirling Media Research Institute, where men were asked questions about the violence contained within a spectrum of broadcast television material. The study reported that much group discussion centred on the Alcoholics Anonymous group scene, which was, for the most part, seen as an accurate depiction of an AA group therapy session. In addition, Phil's portrayal of a suffering alcoholic was also seen as realistic and a "typical portrayal of bottled-up masculinity".

=== The Mitchell car crash ===
Phil's disposition altered during the early 2000s when a darker more menacing side to his personality began to surface. This change was perhaps a consequence of Grant Mitchell's (Ross Kemp) departure, who up until this point had always been depicted as the more selfish, thuggish and nastier of the two. The storyline signifying the departure of Ross Kemp played heavily on the Mitchell brothers' fragile and damaged relationship. After discovering that Grant had vengefully slept with Kathy, Phil went ballistic with a handgun causing the hijacked Vauxhall Astra they were driving to career at high speed into the River Thames, in an episode that was watched by 19.5 million viewers. Shot in London's Docklands, the scenes required stunt doubles, divers and crash test dummies and it has been hailed as "one of the soap's most dramatic storylines ever."

=== Who Shot Phil? ===
Phil immediately after being shot.

Phil's behaviour earned him a number of sworn enemies in Albert Square and by 2001 the character had become one of the soap's nastiest villains. In an interview with The Guardian McFadden commented on his alter ego's descent into villainy "Phil's been had over by a lot of people, so now he feels like he can do it back. It's his history". However, the character finally received his comeuppance in one of EastEnders most highly anticipated storylines, dubbed "Who Shot Phil?". Phil was gunned down outside his home in March 2001 in a "Dallas-style" whodunit mystery. Various key characters were in the frame for the deed and viewers were left guessing for weeks as to which of them was the real culprit. Several outcomes were allegedly filmed and it was reported that only a few TV executives knew the identity of the would-be assassin – even the actors were kept in the dark. A spokesman commented "The cast are only getting their own scripts. They are not being told anyone else's storylines. Not even Phil knows who shot him. It's top secret." Script writers were reportedly given private security after a writer's laptop was stolen in what was believed to be an attempt to gain the identity of the assailant. The storyline captivated the public's imagination leading to thousands of bets being placed at the bookies across the UK – bookmaker William Hill said there was about 50,000 bets on who was responsible.

An estimated 22 million viewers watched EastEnders on 5 April 2001 to find out that Lisa Fowler – Phil's ex-girlfriend – was the culprit. The episode caused the third-largest power surge on record, and the Liverpool and Barcelona UEFA Cup semi-final was postponed for 10 minutes to accommodate a special 40-minute edition of the soap.

=== Temporary departure (2003) ===
In February 2003, it was confirmed that Steve McFadden would be taking a year hiatus. McFadden said: "I'm going to stick my mechanic's overalls in a locker while I take a look at a few other projects. EastEnders will always be No1 in my heart and I look forward to returning to Albert Square." Executive producer Louise Berridge went on to say that she was "looking forward to Steve returning in 2004". In July 2004, it was announced that McFadden had delayed his return. In February 2005, it was confirmed that McFadden would return. His return scenes aired in April 2005 for a brief stint before returning full-time in October.

=== Drug addiction ===
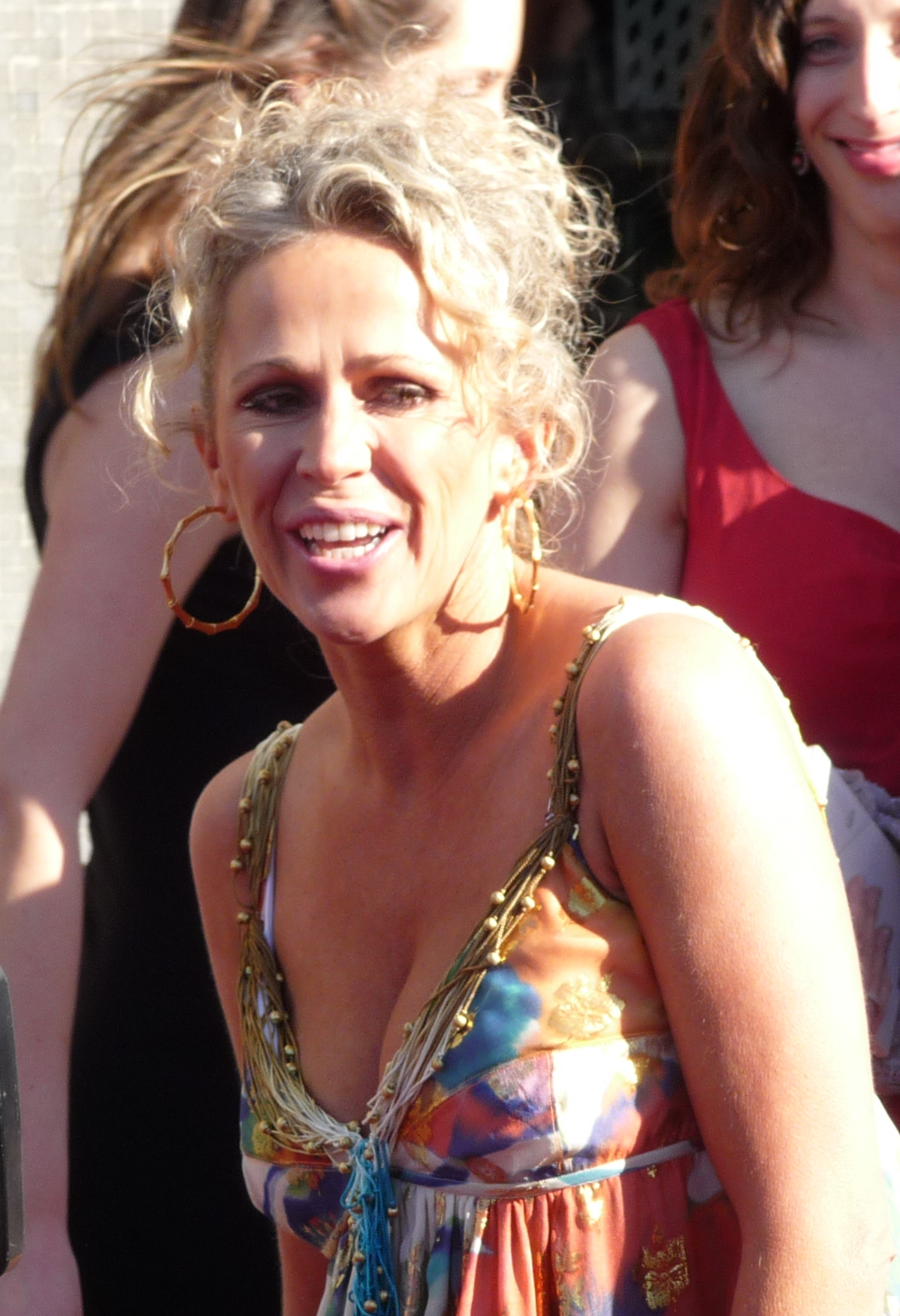
Lucy Benjamin reprised her role of Lisa Fowler for one episode in 2010.

In June 2010, it was reported that Phil would develop an addiction to crack cocaine after his troubled personal life leads to depression. The report followed the news that Lucy Benjamin was to return for a single episode, reprising her role as Lisa, the mother of Phil's daughter, Louise Mitchell (Brittany Papple). In the storyline, Phil gains custody of Louise after she is dropped off in Walford by an unseen person; however, Peggy eventually returns Louise to Lisa after Phil punches his mother in the face. A spokesperson for the show said "Lisa Fowler was a major part of Phil's life – she knows him as well as anyone, so she won't be happy about him looking after his daughter. With their history, you know that this storyline is going to be an explosive episode in the Mitchells' history." Phil also loses his son Ben (Charlie Jones), who makes a temporary departure from the show in order for the part to be recast. Subsequently, Phil becomes addicted to crack cocaine. Producers worked closely with drug and alcohol charities, including Addaction and DrugScope. Viewers never see Phil take drugs to make sure the episodes are suitable for all audiences.. Martin Barnes, chief executive of DrugScope, commented: "If EastEnders sensitively reflect the impact that drug use has on Phil, it could help." The storyline also sees Phil become more violent. McFadden explained:

All he can see is Peggy's betrayed him. She knows how much he fought for custody, for contact and how important it was for him to see his children. He's really angry about it and feels the world is against him. [...] What he's really doing is self-harm which is a common response to anger. People do crazy, mad things like this when they're desperate. It's very ugly and disturbing. [...] He's hit his kids and his mum, so yes, [worse violence is] something he's capable of.

McFadden decided to lose weight for the storyline by going on a crash diet, saying that food would not be one of Phil's priorities.

=== Other storylines ===
The character continues to be featured heavily in high-profile storylines which have included various feuds, police enquiries, armed robbery, kidnapping, numerous affairs and relationship problems and an ongoing plot concentrating on the character's struggles to bond with his children. 2005 saw the highly anticipated screen return of both of the Mitchell brothers – six years since they last appeared together. 13 million viewers tuned in to see their return giving the BBC a 52.9% British audience share, a massive coup for the show which had come under heavy criticism in the British media.

== Storylines ==
=== 1990–2003 ===
Phil Mitchell first arrives in Walford in February 1990 to open an automobile repair shop, known as The Arches; he is joined by his younger brother Grant (Ross Kemp). Two years later, Phil goes into partnership at The Queen Victoria public house with Grant and his wife Sharon Watts (Letitia Dean) – up to the point where he moves in with them. Phil grows close to Sharon, who turns to him for comfort during Grant's violent outbursts. Sharon and Phil have sex but she stays with Grant, who is unaware of their betrayal. Sharon and Grant's reconciliation is brief, and amidst more rowing and physical violence, Grant is arrested and imprisoned. In his absence, Phil and Sharon continue their affair but when Grant is released, Sharon reconciles with him, leaving Phil heartbroken. On the rebound, Phil enters into a marriage of convenience with Nadia Borovac (Anna Barkan) - a Romanian refugee - enabling her to stay in Britain, with Nadia departing after the wedding.

Phil as he appeared in 1994.

Phil begins a relationship with a divorced Kathy Beale (Gillian Taylforth), but Nadia returns, needing Phil to prove he is her husband to prevent deportation. She moves in with him while she is investigated. Nadia seduces and sleeps with a drunken Phil. He regrets it and denies it to Kathy. Phil later bribes her into agreeing to a divorce. Kathy agrees to marry Phil in 1994, despite the pair having to overcome an incident where he torched a vehicle in a car lot owned by his future stepfather Frank Butcher (Mike Reid) to secure an insurance scam; the result accidentally killed a homeless boy trapped inside. Intent on winning Phil back, Sharon kisses him but he ends things there. During Phil and Kathy's engagement party, Grant plays an audio cassette recording of Sharon admitting to the affair. Kathy is incensed, and Grant beats Phil so badly that he has to go to hospital due to a blood clot on his brain. Phil undergoes surgery, which stirs remorse in Grant. He pressures Phil into blaming Sharon for their affair and Grant forces her to leave Walford. Phil and Grant make peace but things between them are not the same.

Kathy and Phil eventually sort out their differences, up to the point where they get married and Kathy later gives birth to their son – Ben (Matthew Silver). As time goes on, however, Phil becomes depressed and turns to alcohol – which causes him to develop an addiction. This makes him bitter and neglectful towards Kathy and Ben, so Kathy takes Ben and moves out.

Realizing what he has lost, Phil gives up alcohol and attends Alcoholics Anonymous. This progressively helps Phil, up to the point where it manages to reveal the basis of his problem – the physical abuse he received from his late father, Eric Mitchell (George Russo) when he was a boy, and his fear that he may abuse Ben. He and Kathy reconcile when he attends counselling, but soon he cheats on Kathy by sleeping with fellow alcoholic Lorna Cartwright (Janet Dibley) – who starts stalking him. With his marriage in jeopardy, Phil takes Kathy to Paris and admits his dalliance with Lorna so Kathy throws her wedding ring into the river, saying their marriage was over for good. Phil begins sleeping rough, gambling, and blaming Kathy for his decline. This prompts her to leave Walford for South Africa, letting it be known that an offer of reconciliation from Phil would make her reconsider. Phil is undecided until Lorna stops him going after Kathy by locking herself in his bathroom and attempts suicide. He later follows Kathy to the airport but is stopped by Kathy's son, Ian (Adam Woodyatt), who persuades him that Kathy and Ben are better off without him. Phil agonies over the loss of his son.

To distract himself, Phil gets involved in a protection racket with Annie Palmer (Nadia Sawalha), who he is also having casual sex with, but grows tired of being bossed around by her and quits. He starts seeing Lisa Shaw (Lucy Benjamin), but the relationship stalls when Kathy returns briefly in 1999 and sleeps with Grant. Before Kathy returns to South Africa, she asks Phil to go with her but he declines as Grant has planned an armed robbery and Phil refuses to let him do the job alone. Infuriated by Phil's loyalty to Grant, Kathy reveals their recent tryst, leading to Phil confronting Grant and Grant's confession that he slept with Kathy as revenge for Phil's affair with Sharon. While trying to escape, Phil pulls out a gun and shoots at the dashboard, causing Grant to crash into the River Thames. Phil is rescued, but Grant isn't found and is presumed dead. However, it is soon revealed that Grant is alive and he escapes to Brazil – though not before sending Phil and their mother Peggy Mitchell (Barbara Windsor) the deeds for his half of The Queen Vic. Though Phil is entrusted by his mother to protect Grant's share of The Queen Vic, he ends up selling it to his business partner Dan Sullivan (Craig Fairbrass) for £5 to spite Peggy due to her favouritism towards Grant. By then, Phil and Dan have become close friends; with Phil being the only person to defend Dan when he is revealed to have cheated on his girlfriend Carol Jackson (Lindsey Coulson) by having an affair with her daughter, Bianca Jackson (Patsy Palmer), the wife of Frank's son, Ricky Butcher (Sid Owen). By this stage, Phil's mother Peggy has married Frank.

Phil and Dan's friendship soon ends after Dan tells the police about a motor scam Phil was involved in and Phil cons Dan into signing the pub over to Peggy. Phil is unsupportive when his girlfriend, Lisa, has a miscarriage and he starts domestically abusing her by getting her sacked from her job and insists she stays at home. This makes her dependent on him so he moves on to her best friend, Mel Healy (Tamzin Outhwaite). Lisa is paranoid that Phil is having an affair and accuses Mel of being his other woman, which she is not, at that point. However, Mel is upset by Lisa's accusation and Phil comforts her, leading to a one-night stand. Mel, however, realises it was a mistake and reconciles with his sworn enemy Steve Owen (Martin Kemp), making Phil jealous. The day before the wedding, Steve finds out that about Mel's one-night stand with Phil after overhearing the pair talk about it. Elsewhere, Lisa decides that a baby will improve their relationship so stops taking contraceptive pills. But Phil wants Lisa to leave him, not get pregnant, and so admits to Lisa that he and Mel slept together. Lisa is heartbroken and decides to keep quiet about her pregnancy, but not before telling her lover Mark Fowler (Todd Carty) about it; Mark, who has grown to resent Phil for his abusive treatment of Lisa, suggests they tell people that the baby is his and she agrees. Mel soon becomes outraged by Phil's volatile behaviour, such as his treatment of Lisa and Ian after refusing to help the latter when he undergoes financial bankruptcy.

On 1 March 2001, the day of Steve and Mel's wedding, Phil has created many enemies around him; Lisa, Steve, Mark, Ian, and Dan. Later on that night, Phil is shot and collapses in a pool of blood. Steve is the prime suspect and is arrested, but Phil – knowing Steve is innocent – confronts the real culprit, Lisa, weeks later after he is discharged from hospital. Realizing he drove her to it, Phil gradually forgives Lisa and instead decides to frame Dan upon learning that he has been extorting money from his godson Jamie (Jack Ryder) – whom Phil had taken under his wing to spare him from being further abused by his legal guardian and uncle, Billy (Perry Fenwick). His plan come to fruition when Phil contacts Dan's former crime boss, Ritchie Stringer (Gareth Hunt), and together to pair conspire to incriminate Dan for the shooting; with Ritchie giving Dan the same gun that Lisa used to shoot Phil. Unaware that he is being set up, Dan holds Phil at gunpoint – demanding money until he is arrested for attempted murder.

Despite the pair still being fierce enemies, Steve later conspires with Phil to have Dan sent down in order to rid Mel from her tormentor for good, but Dan is ultimately acquitted despite their efforts. Dan later seeks revenge on Phil and Steve. After blackmailing Billy into telling him that Mel slept with Phil before she married Steve on the night of the shooting, Dan kidnaps Mel and alerts both Phil and Steve about this – threatening to kill her unless they pay him £200,000. After the two are forced to work together to provide £200,000 for Mel's release, Phil plans to take Dan down during the exchange. He momentarily subdues Dan and prepares to shoot him, but Mel – after learning how Phil and Steve framed Dan for the shooting – helps Dan by turning off the lights to distract Phil, which allows Dan to overpower him. Dan then escapes with the money, never to be seen in Walford again, while Phil recovers and returns to the square upon helping Steve rescue Mel.

Shortly before the events of Dan's trial and Mel's kidnapping, Sharon returns to the square; she reconciles with Phil and they run The Queen Vic together. Phil soon wants children with Sharon, but she reveals that she is infertile due to a botched abortion; Sharon later admits that the baby she aborted six years earlier was that of Grant. This soon puts a strain on their relationship and by Christmas they have separated, resulting in Sharon returning to the United States. They had been intent on adopting a baby until Peggy reacts to the suggestion with horror, and Sharon is not keen on Phil's suggestion of having a surrogate child.

Before Sharon leaves, she tells Phil that he is the father of Lisa's daughter, Louise Fowler (Rachel Cox) – not Mark, as she had earlier claimed. Phil confronts Lisa, demanding contact. Unhappy at this, Steve and Mel ask Lisa and Louise to emigrate to California with them. She agrees but changes her mind and telephones Steve, asking him to return Louise. He refuses to, so Phil attempts to get Louise back, resulting in a car chase that ends when Steve crashes his car into a wall. Phil rescues Louise but the car explodes before he can help Steve, who dies in the inferno. Phil persuades Lisa to return to him and then makes it clear that it is Louise he and Peggy want, not Lisa. Phil and Peggy hire a nanny, Joanne Ryan (Tara Lynne O'Neill), without consulting her, telling her that Lisa is mentally unstable. Phil demands that Lisa change Louise's name to Mitchell legally and organises a christening. Lisa agrees until some of Phil's relatives, assuming she is the nanny, start talking about how unstable Louise's mother is. Furious at this, she and Louise flee to Portugal – with Jamie and Sonia reluctantly assisting her after growing uncomfortable with Phil's violent tendencies. However, Phil soon takes his frustrations out on Jamie and brutally attacks him in the Jackson home after he tries to defend Sonia and confesses that he knew Lisa was gonna run away. Phil goes to Portugal and returns a month later with Louise. Sonia and Jamie become very suspicious and report Phil to the police. They then jump to the conclusion that Phil may have killed Lisa. Sonia raises her suspicions and the police keep a close watch on him. This causes some of Phil's neighbors to suspect that he has murdered Lisa. This further deteriorates Phil and Jamie's relationship. However, they later make peace after Jamie saves Peggy from her muggers and gets her purse back. But Jamie is accidentally knocked down by Martin Fowler's car and dies in Sonia's arms on Christmas Day. Phil is left completely devastated by this and delivers a eulogy at his wake.

Phil soon falls for Kate Morton (Jill Halfpenny), unaware that she is an undercover police officer investigating Lisa's disappearance. The police believe that Lisa is dead, and at one stage a body is found which the police fear may be that of Lisa. After Phil confesses that he manipulated Lisa to give him Louise and paid her to leave the square for good, Kate reveals her true identity. In response, Phil ends his romance with Kate and threatens to kill her – even when she admits to loving him with the promise of quitting her job. Kate disappears, but several months later, Phil finds her working as the secretary for the Walford's veteran reigning gangland kingpin – Jack Dalton (Hywel Bennett). He soon begins to visit Dalton, most notably when Phil finds out that Dalton discovers Kate's identity. When Dalton plans to have her killed, sending his bouncer George Peters (Andy Beckwith) to rape and murder Kate in her house, Phil comes to Kate's rescue by knocking out Peters just as he attacks Kate. Though she insists on getting the police involved, Kate allows Phil to deal with Dalton on his own. This Phil does by frogmarching Peters back to Dalton's nightclub, the "Imperial Room", and urging Dalton himself to let Kate go free. Dalton agrees to spare Kate, but tells Phil that he now owes him a favour.

It is at this point where Sharon's adoptive brother, Dennis Rickman (Nigel Harman), arrives in Walford. Dennis is nearing 30 but Sharon had only discovered his existence in the spring of 2003 – he was the product of an affair between Sharon's adoptive father Den Watts (who had disappeared and supposedly died in 1989) and a younger woman called Paula Rickman, who dies just before Sharon finally manages to locate him.

Phil and Dennis waste no time in becoming enemies, clashing when Dennis punches Phil in The Queen Vic. During this time, Phil rebuilds his relationship with Kate, but he later grows annoyed when Kate befriends Dennis, and ends up punching him upon learning that the two nearly had sex together. Later on, Phil learns that Dennis has previously been involved in Dalton's criminal organization – The Firm. This is further notified when Dalton summons Phil to carry out his favour with a task: killing Dennis. At first, Phil is willing to go along with it and goes to confront Dennis at Sharon's nightclub, "Angie's Den", where he holds him at gunpoint. Phil prepares to kill Dennis, but changes his mind when Dennis offers to kill Dalton himself – so that they can both be free of him; Phil reluctantly gives Dennis the gun to go after Dalton, and is later surprised to learn that Dennis actually killed Dalton as he promised. Following Dalton's death, his representative Andy Hunter (Michael Higgs) confronts Phil over the circumstances of his and Dennis's alleged involvement; Andy manipulates Phil into confirming that Dennis was the one who killed Dalton, reigniting their feud when Dennis finds out. In the ensuing clash between them, Phil orders a group of thugs to beat Dennis up and later slaps Sharon when she confronts him over it.

Phil and Kate get married. However, on their wedding day, Phil is unhappy when Lisa reappears – demanding access to Louise. When Phil refuses to do so, Lisa plans to shoot him again until she backs down. Towards the end of September 2003, Dennis and Sharon are reunited with their father Den Watts (Leslie Grantham) – who returns to the square after 14 years, when he had supposedly been shot dead on Dalton's orders.

When Phil and Den cross paths with each other, they quickly become enemies, although Den manages to feign an admiration for Phil as part of his bid to bring about his downfall. Their feud culminates badly for Phil, when he reluctantly joins Den in an armed robbery – only to learn that Den had set him up on behalf of both Lisa and his family; Phil is subsequently arrested when the police arrive on the scene. When she discovers this, Lisa tells Kate that she is taking Louise. Unable to stop her legally, Kate agrees; however, Phil discovers this and his marriage with Kate ends after he refuses to forgive her for costing him Louise. Just before Christmas 2003, Phil escapes from prison and confronts Den; they fight until Den gives him £200,000 to survive 'on the run', and Phil punches Dennis in revenge for their earlier differences. Phil then flees Walford and is not seen for over a year afterwards.

=== 2005–present ===
Phil returns 18 months later, needing more money. He attacks Ian, who calls the police and Phil is arrested. However, the case collapses after Grant returns to Walford and pays a witness to change his testimony and Phil is released. The brothers return to Walford when Peggy requests they help his sister, Sam Mitchell (Kim Medcalf), who is wrongfully remanded in custody for Den's murder; Den was murdered by his second wife and Sam's nemesis, Chrissie Watts (Tracy-Ann Oberman), after the duo and Sam's friend Zoe Slater (Michelle Ryan) initially worked together to get revenge on Den for his nefarious activities – including Sam's intent to avenge Phil's ordeal. Upon arriving at the square, Phil and Grant notice Peggy being mugged and end up rescuing her. Shortly afterwards, they learn that Peggy's mugging was organised by her enemy and Walford's newly installed crime kingpin: Johnny Allen (Billy Murray). This prompts Phil and Grant to confront Johnny, warning him to stay away from Peggy under the threat of further violence. The pair then confront Chrissie in the pub, where Phil stops Grant from attacking her and Dennis, before Sharon intervenes on their behalf. However, Sharon and Dennis soon learn the truth about Chrissie killing Den and they end up joining forces with the Mitchells to help Sam against Chrissie – with Phil and Dennis putting their differences aside over their previous rivalry.

While Grant also make amends with Sharon by making peace with Dennis as well, Phil begins a feud with Johnny over his issue with Peggy and the fact that he and Chrissie are having a partnership over the pub's ownership. When Billy uses his job as Johnny's nightclub to discover CCTV footage of Chrissie confessing Den's murder to her boyfriend Jake Moon (Joel Beckett) and Johnny's henchman from an earlier night, Billy informs Phil – who goes to confront Johnny without Grant's consent. At first Phil attempts to negotiate with Johnny to no avail, but they end up fighting when Grant intervenes – punching Jake and helping Phil batter Johnny to steal the recording. As Jake flees to alert Chrissie of the situation, Johnny holds Phil and Grant at gunpoint to reclaim the recording – but relents in letting them escape when his daughter Ruby Allen (Louisa Lytton) walks in on the incident. Before fleeing with the recording, Phil learns from Johnny that Ian is Chrissie's mystery buyer for the pub; he and Billy confront Ian, while Grant helps Sharon and Dennis look for Chrissie. Eventually, the police catch up to Chrissie just as she prepares to flee the country at the airport and Sharon punches her in revenge for her father's death; Chrissie is then arrested and sentenced to life imprisonment, while Sam is released from prison – only to end up fleeing the country when she finds herself implicated for perverting the course of justice for Den's murder. Despite the circumstances over Sam's ordeal, the Mitchells still celebrate Chrissie's imprisonment when Sharon announces that she forged a contract that Ian had signed – thereby meaning that Ian does not officially own the pub, and thus the Mitchells are the true owners of The Queen Vic once more. Around Christmas 2005, Phil escalates his feud with Johnny and ends up entrapping Dennis on his behalf; Dennis and Johnny embark on a conflict afterwards. When Phil discovers that Johnny threatened Sharon with Dennis' life, he attempts to intimidate Dennis in attacking Johnny in retribution; Dennis refuses, but relents when Phil tells him that Johnny killed Andy and throttled Sharon. Unfortunately, after Dennis batters Johnny at the stroke of the New Year, Johnny arranges for him to be stabbed and Dennis dies in Sharon's arms – leaving her devastated, while Phil becomes ridden with guilt for Dennis' death and vows revenge against Johnny. After comforting Sharon when she lashes out at Johnny in the wake of Dennis' funeral, Phil promises to avenge his death. Phil later convinces Grant to help him confront Johnny at his new home in rural Essex, but he escapes and the brothers pursue him. However, Phil's squabbling with Grant allows Johnny to capture them and Johnny orders Jake's brother Danny Moon (Jake Maskall) to kill the brothers. But before Danny can execute Grant, Jake arrives and shoots Danny – accidentally killing him, as Jake meant to merely stop his brother by shooting him in the arm or leg. While Jake buries Danny's body alone, Phil and Grant return to Johnny's home and find that Johnny has surrendered at Ruby's request; Johnny is later sentenced to life imprisonment for the murders of Andy and Dennis, though he later dies of a heart attack in October 2006. After resolving matters with Grant and securing Jake's safety from being exposed as a killer following the discovery of Danny's death, Phil resumes life with his family and Sharon.

Following the supposed death of Kathy and her husband Gavin Sullivan (Paul Nicholas) earlier on, Ben returns to England and moves in with Ian – much to Phil's surprise. Phil and Ben later spend time together and they slowly bond, eventually leading to Ben moving in with Phil. Phil starts dating Stella Crawford (Sophie Thompson), but she mentally and physically abuses Ben – forcing him into persuading Phil to propose to her. Ben reveals the abuse during the wedding ceremony, and Stella flees to an abandoned warehouse with Phil in pursuit – where she kills herself by jumping from the roof. Later on, Phil claims to have killed Stella and is taken into custody – but is later released without charge. He then forms a relationship with local beautician Suzy Branning (Maggie O'Neill) in an attempt to move on from Stella, and the two end up getting engaged with each other after she falsely claims to be pregnant with his child. Phil does not believe his friend, Shirley Carter (Linda Henry), when she tells him that Suzy is conning him; he stays with Suzy until he discovers she has been forging her pregnancy in a bid to con money from him.

Soon afterwards, Phil recoups his alcoholism upon struggling to cope with his turbulent relationships with Stella and Suzy – up to the point where he nearly takes his frustrations out of Ben. During a family meal where Peggy is set to announce her engagement to her brother-in-law, Archie (Larry Lamb), tensions build when Phil upsets Ben and nearly lashes out at him. This prompts Archie to confront Phil over his behaviour. In doing so, the two share a conversation about how they were respectively abused by their fathers – with Phil confining to Archie about to extent of how Eric treated him, before Archie explains that both he and Eric were mistreated by their father prior to his death; which Archie claims to be the "best thing that happened to him". Afterwards, Phil makes amends with Ben and the two support Archie when he and Peggy plan to get married. Their wedding initially appears successful, but it ends in disaster at the reception; Phil witnesses his cousin, Ronnie Mitchell (Samantha Womack), discover that Archie – her father – had manipulated her into believing that her long-lost daughter, Danielle Jones (Lauren Crace), whom she previously employed as her secretary, was dead. When Peggy learns the extent of Archie's deceit, she ends their marriage by ordering Phil to throw him out of the pub – shortly before the family learn that Danielle has died after being fatally struck by a car driven by Frank's daughter, Janine Butcher (Charlie Brooks).

Following Danielle's funeral, Peggy asks Phil to kill Archie so they could get justice for Danielle and Ronnie. He obliges and has Archie kidnapped, but lets him go after threatening him to stay away from Walford. However, Archie later returns to the square and ignores Phil's constant demands that he leave Walford again. As Christmas approaches in December 2009, Phil and Peggy are horrified to learn that Archie has extorted the pub from them after he formed a relationship with Janine and the two conspired to have Ian collaborate with them – particularly when Phil gave Ian a loan and gets beaten up as a result of not being able to pay it back. This could have been a motive for both Phil and Peggy, along with their family, when Archie is later murdered on Christmas night. Afterwards, Phil is surprised when DCI Jill Marsden (Sophie Stanton) takes charge of the murder investigation; as Phil and Marsden became sworn enemies ever since she investigated his shooting – before going on to intercept Phil's criminal activities prior to him being set up for the robbery. During the investigation, Phil clashes with Janine as they both plan to retake various properties from the square. However, it is later revealed that Archie's killer was in fact his rape victim Stacey Branning (Lacey Turner); this was discovered just moments after her husband Bradley Branning (Charlie Clements) fell to his death whilst on the run from the police, which Phil had witnessed in the midst of celebrating Ricky and Bianca's second wedding.

Although troubled by lapses in alcoholism due to numerous family upsets, Phil begins to settle into a relationship with Shirley – particularly when she becomes a mother figure for Ben and Louise, who is staying with Phil while Lisa is away. Trouble stirs, however, when Phil ends up getting distant from both his children in 2010: Ben is sent to a juvenile offenders' unit for attacking his friend Jordan Johnson (Michael-Joel David Stuart), which sparks a clash between Jordan's father, Lucas Johnson (Don Gilet) and Phil himself in the process, and Louise returns to her mother before the pair disappear under Lisa's guise that Phil can have contact at any time. Depressed, Phil embarks on a sexual relationship with drug addict Rainie Cross (Tanya Franks) and begins to use crack cocaine – developing an addiction. When Peggy finds out about this, she locks him inside her home so he cannot have access to drugs; however, Phil – suffering from withdrawal symptoms – escapes and confronts Peggy, setting the pub on fire as a result. Within minutes, the pub is ablaze and the roof collapses on Phil. He is rescued and Peggy leaves the next day, realising he is better off without her.

Shirley supports Phil through recovery. They steal a large amount of money from Ronnie's sister, Roxy Mitchell (Rita Simons), to buy a house together. This is soon discovered by Ronnie and Roxy's mother, Glenda Mitchell (Glynis Barber). In response, she makes a deal with Phil for her daughters' sake and the two later begin an affair. When Phil discovers Glenda is also having an affair with his enemy Ian, he threatens to tell Ian's wife Jane Beale (Laurie Brett), unless he pays him £5,000. Phil's bullying of Ian almost costs him his life: when Ian finds Phil having a heart attack, he threatens to let him die but helps Phil for Ben's sake. Phil re-evaluates his life following his near-death experience and proposes to Shirley. Shirley initially accepts, but later changes her mind after discovering Phil's affair with Glenda; though she later forgives Phil for his infidelity, Shirley refuses to marry him.

Phil reacts badly when he discovers Ben (now Joshua Pascoe) is gay, and makes it clear that he prefers Billy's foster son, Jay Brown (Jamie Borthwick). Jay likes spending time with Phil and changes his surname to Mitchell, becoming Phil's surrogate son. Ben secretly enacts revenge on Phil for this rejection, terrorising him with letters, implying he has evidence to incriminate Phil for past misdemeanours. Among other deeds, Ben sends Denise Fox (Diane Parish) evidence that Phil supplied the cut-and-shut car responsible for her ex-husband, Kevin Wicks' (Phil Daniels), death in 2008. Denise's attempts to get Phil imprisoned fail; however, Marsden soon investigates the allegations and Ben tells her that Phil forced Stella to jump from the roof back in 2007. Phil is held on remand in prison on suspicion of Stella's murder and Ben delights in the distress he causes his father. Ian, however, is horrified by Ben's behaviour, and tells the police that Ben is lying; but Ben thinks Shirley's best friend, Heather Trott (Cheryl Fergison), is responsible. Fearful and angry, Ben retaliates by murdering Heather just as Phil returns to confront him. Blaming himself for Ben's actions, Phil makes the murder look like a burglary, spurns a grieving Shirley, allows his neighbours and family to become murder suspects, and bullies Ian into keeping quiet after Ben confesses to him.

During a charity abseil on top of The Queen Vic, Shirley proposes to Phil and he accepts. At their engagement party, Sharon returns, begging for help, as she has left her fiancé, John Hewland (Jesse Birdsall) at the altar and he has her son, Dennis Rickman (Harry Hickles). Phil helps her to rescue Dennis and they return with Phil to Walford. When Phil gets home, he finds that Shirley knows the truth about Heather's death. After a furious confrontation, he tries to convince her not to tell the police but Ben confesses to the police and is charged with Heather's murder. Jay is charged with perverting the course of justice and Phil orders him to change his statement so Ben will not go to prison, but Jay refuses and Phil disowns him but does manage to convince Roxy to lie in her statement. His solicitor, Ritchie Scott (Sian Webber), tells him that Ben could face a minimum of 10 years in prison. Shirley ends her relationship with Phil as she is unable to cope with his betrayal. Phil visits Ben in prison with Ian in the hope of persuading Ben to retract his confession but Ben refuses, insisting that he is doing the right thing as he needs to be punished. Ben refuses to have any contact with his family until his release.

Following Ben's departure, Phil bonds with Dennis. When Billy's great-granddaughter, Lexi Pearce (Dotti-Beau Cotterill), is taken into care, Lexi's mother Lola (Danielle Harold) tells Phil that Ben is Lexi's father and Phil is her grandfather. Lola agrees for Phil to have residence of Lexi and he suggests to Sharon that they pretend to be in a relationship to increase the chances of success, even though she is in a relationship with Jack Branning (Scott Maslen). They tell social workers that they are engaged but Shirley threatens to tell the truth, so Phil tells them the engagement is over. Phil is appointed Lexi's foster carer and ordered to arrange for Lola to visit Lexi three times a week but he immediately takes over, angering Lola by calling Lexi his baby, refusing to take presents that Lola buys for her and having her christened with the name Mitchell, instead of Pearce. Phil and Jack become rivals when Phil tells Jack that he will be with Sharon by the end of the year, and Phil even proposes to Sharon, though she accepts Jack's proposal of marriage instead. When Phil offers Sharon an increase of her salary, and a 19% stake in club, Jack is not pleased and punches Phil, who falls into the vehicle pit in the garage. Jack thinks he has killed Phil, but Phil later arrives at the pub and announces Jack's guilt. Jack is arrested but Phil does not press charges after Sharon convinces him for her and Lexi's sake. At the court hearing to determine Lexi's future, Phil exposes Lola's lateness and temper during her scheduled meetings with Lexi, sabotaging her chances of winning Lexi back. He later tells Billy that Lola will never get Lexi back, which Lola overhears. She snatches Lexi from his house. Lola evades Phil, Billy and Sharon, until eventually they find her. Phil tells Social Services it is his fault for being too relaxed with Lola, but then allows Lola to look after Lexi while he goes out. When Lexi is unwell, Phil praises Lola's actions, and decides to tell Social Services that Lola may be ready to have Lexi back.

Phil and Sharon reunite after her relationship with Jack ends. However, it ends when Sharon's painkiller addiction puts Lexi in danger. Lola regains full custody of Lexi, leaving Phil to feel lonely. When Shirley's benefits are cut and she is forced to move out of the B&B, Phil secretly pays her rent. Shirley finds out and believes he is doing it so she will stay quiet about his involvement in Heather's death. Shirley demands money from Phil, which he does not have, forcing him to accept a deal from Derek's associate Carl White (Daniel Coonan) – who had recently arrived in the square. They soon clash, however, when it becomes clear that Carl plans to usurp Phil as the square's reigning hardman. After luring Phil into his car, Carl seemingly drives them to a meet-up with his associates. However, he then deliberately crashes the car after releasing Phil's seatbelt – thus causing Phil to be thrown through the windscreen. He is airlifted to hospital and requires an operation. While he is recovering, he puts Ronnie in charge of his businesses. Carl tries to intimidate her and use the garage for illegal purposes. Shirley confronts Carl about his actions, and she mysteriously disappears after this, though her friends believe she has gone to Greece as she had planned. Once recovered, Phil learns that Carl is framing their business partner Max Branning (Jake Wood) for causing the car crash – as well as using Ian as a false witness. Phil kidnaps Ian on the day of Max's trial so he cannot testify, and then kidnaps Carl once Max is acquitted. Phil prepares to kill Carl, but Carl implies that he caused harm to Shirley. He takes Phil to a block of run-down flats where Shirley is staying with her sister Tina Carter (Luisa Bradshaw-White). It quickly turns out Carl threatened Shirley to stay away from Walford or he would harm Phil's family. Carl leaves, and Phil pleads with Shirley to return to Walford. She agrees and they return together, after which Phil confronts Carl once Shirley returns to her home. Carl is unfazed by Phil's threats for retribution and gloats that he has contacts inside prison who can harm Ben if Phil does anything to him.

At the start of 2014, Phil learns that Carl has entrapped Ronnie into having a relationship with him – though she quickly ends it upon discovering his actions against the Mitchells. Phil later kidnaps Carl in the garage and plans to kill him, though Ronnie stops him at the last minute. However, as they reluctantly agree to force him out of Walford, Ronnie ends up killing Carl after he attempts to rape her whilst Phil is out of the garage. After discovering this, Phil helps Ronnie cover up the murder – only for Sharon to investigate the pair upon learning of Carl's death. When she eventually confronts Phil about this, he confines to Sharon about how Ronnie killed Carl to protect their family against his threats. Sharon grows to accept his theory, but then demands to know if he is hiding anymore secrets from her – up to the point when she asks him what could be worse than covering up a murder. This prompts Phil to finally reveal the true circumstances of how Dennis died on New Year's Eve 2005, explaining how he is the reason Dennis attacked Johnny, prior to the latter having him killed. In response, Sharon runs away from Phil and becomes so distraught that she refuses to rebuild their relationship – though she eventually reconsiders after Phil apologizes to her about Dennis, and she forgives him soon afterwards.

When Phil learns that Jake and Danny's cousin Alfie Moon (Shane Richie) has upset Roxy no sooner after she started working for him and the pair later got married, he retaliates by selling the pub to get one over Alfie. However, Phil is surprised when the pub's new owner turns out to be Shirley's brother Mick Carter (Danny Dyer). He then learns from Ben that Lola has ended their relationship and has begun dating Ian's son Peter Beale (Ben Hardy). When Phil confronts her about this, she tells Phil that he cannot see Lexi if he objects. This prompts Phil to confront Ian once more, forcing him to object to the relationship instead. Phil repairs his fractured relationship with Sharon and they have sex. Sharon resumes her relationship with Phil and moves in with him. Together, they buy 10 Turpin Road and convert it into a new bar, which Sharon names "The Albert". When Ian's daughter Lucy dies, Phil begins supporting his former enemy and helps him get back on his feet. Witnessing Ian's grief prompts Phil to try to get back in touch with Ben, but he is stunned when Ritchie tells him that Ben has already been released from prison. Phil starts to track down Ben, but is convinced by Jay and Sharon that Ben will return when he is ready. Phil is stunned when he realises that Mick is in fact Shirley's son, who she had at fourteen, subsequently raised by Shirley's parents as their son, without Mick ever discovering the truth. Phil then agrees to be her confidant for the secret in exchange for money, which Shirley steals from her younger son Dean Wicks (Matt Di Angelo) at his salon; he later discovers this and confronts his mother about her involvement with Phil, who later warns Dean off when they cross paths.

Phil soon gets into a disagreement with Sharon when she continually puts her work at The Albert before their relationship, only beginning to become more involved with the bar when she is unimpressed at his lack of interest in her work. Closing up one night after an event, two men break in and vandalize the bar, and when Sharon attempts to defend herself alone, she is severely beaten and left for dead. She is later hospitalized with a ruptured spleen, leaving Phil distraught – though he later admits to Shirley that he arranged for the men to scare Sharon at the bar, but believed the bodyguards that he hired for her would have protected her and did not realise that she would be hurt. When Shirley confesses she still loves Phil, he spurns her advances and instead proposes marriage to Sharon after she regains consciousness. Unaware of Phil's role in her attack, Sharon accepts. However, she later overhears his secret and begins plotting against him with the help from their family solicitor Marcus Christie (Stephen Churchett). Despite this, she later changes her mind and asks Marcus to return all Phil's money to his accounts – unaware that Phil has seen them. After meeting with his accountant, Phil is angry and tells Shirley what he has discovered only for their conversation to turn to passion. Phil later changes his mind; he realises that since Sharon is returning the money, it should not matter to him as he still wants to go through with the wedding. They later marry in late September 2014, but are oblivious to Shirley's bitterness – up to the point where she attempts to persuade him to be with her, rather than Sharon, only hours before the wedding. After the reception, Shirley enters their house and confronts them; Sharon is left devastated when she realises Phil has been cheating behind her back even after he asked her to marry him. However, she decides that she still loves Phil and wants to be with him. After Phil insults Shirley and makes hurtful remarks about the fling they had together, an enraged Shirley attempts to go for him, but Sharon stops her, and after a brief struggle, Phil is accidentally shot. He is then rushed to hospital, Shirley fleeing with the help of her aunt, Babe Smith (Annette Badland). When Ronnie discovers her gun was used after Shirley stole it, Ronnie asks Jay and Ben to dispose of it.

When Phil finds out that Ronnie has stolen money from him to bribe their enemy Nick Cotton (John Altman) to leave before her wedding, they argue. After Nick takes the money but refuses to leave, Ronnie asks Phil to get rid of Nick. Nick overhears this, and cuts the brakes of the wedding car. Later, while Phil confronts Nick in his house, Ronnie goes into labour and on the way to the hospital, the wedding car crashes. Whilst still at the hospital, Phil is arrested for attempted murder and – realising that Nick has framed him – asks Sharon to help him prove his innocence. When Phil learns that Max has taken over The Arches, he promises revenge and blames Sharon for the loss of the business. He is released on bail and vanishes, to Sharon's concern; he returns a week later, with Peggy, to get a passport. He comes close to telling Ian something, but is interrupted by Ben, who is shocked to see he is back. When Sharon confronts him, she tells him that she will leave him if he indulges in anymore dodgy activity. Phil vanishes again, and is next seen meeting with a long-thought dead Kathy in central London. She wants to return to Walford, but Phil tells her to stay away – for Ian and Ben's sakes.

Ben is arrested on suspicion of murdering Ian's daughter, Lucy Beale (Hetti Bywater). Phil suspects he did and practically disowns him, handing in critical evidence to the police. However, Abi Branning (Lorna Fitzgerald) tells Phil that she thinks her father, Max, killed Lucy, so Phil punches Max and hopes Ben will be released. Phil finds out that Sharon has been helping Jane cover up the real killer, Bobby Beale (Eliot Carrington), Lucy's half-brother, Phil tells Jane and Sharon that he will bribe the foreman of the jury to make sure Max is not guilty. The jury find Max guilty and it emerges that Phil paid the foreman for this verdict. Sharon discovers this and kicks him out of their home. He then discovers that Ben is in a sexual relationship with Paul Coker (Jonny Labey) and is kidnapped by Kathy's husband, Gavin. Weeks later, the police find Phil's blood in the house that belonged to Gavin's sister – Margaret Midhurst (Jan Harvey). A week later, Phil returns home, battered and bruised. He collapses and is taken to hospital, where they discover he has several broken bones from two days before. He then asks Ben for alcohol, revealing he has been drinking during his kidnapping.

It soon transpires one of Phil's neighbours, Vincent Hubbard (Richard Blackwood), is out for revenge against his family – because he believes that Phil's father Eric had murdered his own father, Henry, many years earlier. Their conflict leads to Phil abducting Vincent's daughter, Pearl Fox-Hubbard, with the two threatening to shoot each other – up to the point where Vincent attempts to strangle Phil to death, before later sorting out their differences when his friend, Fatboy (Ricky Norwood) gets accidentally killed. By then, Phil's drinking worsens and he drives with Ian and Dennis in the car whilst intoxicated. Distracted, Phil crashes the car, and Dennis is badly injured. In exchange for Sharon not telling the police about Bobby killing Lucy, Phil agrees with Ian that Ian will take the blame for causing the crash. While Dennis is being attended to, a doctor tells Phil that his scans showed he has cirrhosis of the liver, a disease garnered from his alcoholism. The doctor warns Phil that without treatment, he could die, but Phil remains in denial about this. He later researches cirrhosis online at home and when he finds out that Dennis is recovering, decides to give up drinking and rushes to the hospital to tell Sharon that he will always stand by her.

Eventually, Phil feels guilty about the crash and drinks alcohol again. He confesses the truth to Shirley, who encourages him to tell Sharon. He does so, and Sharon punches him and insists she will divorce him. Phil begs her to stay, admitting he is dying from cirrhosis. Sharon does not believe him, but tells him to die quickly. No longer wanted by his family, Phil leaves and sleeps in a car. Wanting Louise's address, he discovers that Peggy is back in London, so visits her. He gets the name of Louise's school before Peggy tells him that her cancer has returned and she is dying. Phil finds Louise (now played by Tilly Keeper) at her school and he gives her money to support her future. He then collapses. Later, Louise goes to Walford to tell the family that Phil is in hospital with a damaged liver. Sharon, Kathy and Shirley go to the hospital to find out that Phil discharged himself. They find Phil drunk at the pub, where he insults his family and hits Kathy. Days later, he coughs up blood and is taken to hospital. The doctor tells his family that he needs an urgent liver transplant and that if Phil continues to drink, he will be dead within 12 months. Phil and Ronnie learn that Phil must remain sober for at least six months before he can undergo the liver transplant. Ronnie vows to help Phil regain his sobriety and allows him to move in with her and Honey once he is discharged from hospital, but the drinking continues. Phil finally gives up after Sharon colludes with Ritchie to take the family businesses from Phil. After a bumping into a 'pregnant' Abi, she lies to Ben that she lost the baby she never had. A furious Ben tries to suffocate Phil but is stopped by Sharon. Phil orders Sharon and Ben out, before storming off. He then drunkenly trashes the Arches before commandeering a digger and demolishes the car lot. Phil is stunned when a badly injured Louise is found in the wreckage, and with her pleas he decides to finally give up the booze. Phil is later reunited with a dying Peggy. Grant also makes a brief reappearance, warning Phil to expect a war over money owed to Grant. The brothers try to dissuade Peggy from committing suicide but are unaware of pills secretly hidden in her makeup bag. Phil is devastated by her death, unable to make a eulogy for her funeral, especially when he reads the loving letter she left him. He finds out that Peggy betrayed his father to the police to protect Phil and visits her grave. Some time after, Phil tries to give Ian advice after Bobby violently assaults Jane, putting her in hospital.

Phil is told by Ian that Ben has died after a homophobic attack following a night out, however this turns out to be Paul, Ben's boyfriend. Ben struggles to grieve for Paul's death and asks Phil for a gun to take revenge, but he refuses and Ben disappears. When Grant returns to Walford again, he accuses Phil of killing Peggy and still orders him to return all of the money Phil owes to him. After going through Sharon's bag, Phil learns that Grant has a son, Mark Fowler (Ned Porteous), with Sharon's best friend Michelle Fowler (Susan Tully) as the mother following a one-night stand between them from 21 years previously. After agreeing to drop the truth, Phil denies speaking to Mark. Unbeknownst to Phil, Denise discovers she is five months pregnant by him as a result of a one-night stand they had. Ben and Jay are kidnapped by Paul's killers and he attempts to go after them; however, when he collapses, Grant offers to help him get Ben and Jay back. In gratitude for Grant rescuing Ben, Phil tells Grant that Mark is his son. Grant persuades Phil to attend Paul's funeral for Ben's sake, which he does. Phil lends Grant money to support him financially and Grant tells him to fight his liver condition. Later, Ben tells Phil that he will donate part of his liver. Phil advises against it but Ben is adamant, however, Ben's psychiatric test results mean that it is unlikely he will be able to. Phil is hospitalised again with an infection and Sharon discovers that Phil has changed his will to leave everything to Louise so she forces him to have the will amended to include her. When Jay returns, Sharon allows him back into the Mitchell household, and when Phil is discharged and returns home, he eventually allows Jay to live there. When Phil has been sober for six months, he refuses to have the transplant, devastating his family, though Sharon supports his decision. However, after one of Dennis's friends at school is stabbed and dies, Dennis is visibly upset, and therefore Phil decides to go on the transplant list after realising he does not want to put his family through the upset of his death. Phil decides he wants to spend Christmas alone and Sharon reluctantly agrees. Phil is taken to hospital when a liver is found and changes his mind about being alone at Christmas, and he does not change his mind after tests show that the liver is not suitable. Jay has a visit from his police public protection officer, who says Jay will have to move out as Louise is underage. Phil refuses to make Jay leave, despite being told that Louise could be taken into care. On Christmas Day 2016, a matching liver is found and Phil at last has the operation.

Max returns to Walford and Sharon decides not to tell Phil, but when Max discovers that Phil bribed the foreman in his trial, Max visits Phil in hospital, revealing that he knows the truth. Phil hands Max his pillow, insisting that he kills him, but Max shakes his hand and says that he forgives him. Phil is unable to give Ronnie away on her wedding day to Jack, so she and Roxy visit him in hospital. The next day, Sharon tells Phil that Ronnie and Roxy have died in the hotel swimming pool – which devastates Phil. Phil is discharged from hospital and Sharon eventually discovers that Phil is the father of Denise's baby after overhearing a discussion between Shirley and Denise. Sharon decides not to tell Phil the truth, but later changes her mind when she learns that Denise is planning to give her son up for adoption. When Phil expresses his wish to adopt Dennis, Sharon tells him the truth about his son. At the hospital, Phil demands to see his son, but Sharon gets him and Denise to talk calmly. Sharon agrees to help Phil fight for his son. After emotionally holding him, Phil leaves without him. Phil refuses to speak at Ronnie and Roxy's funeral, but changes his mind after Michelle (now played by Jenna Russell) speaks to him. Phil meets Aaron, the son of his friend Tony, who was meant to have the liver the Phil received, and gives him money out of guilt for having survived when Tony died; however, Aaron's mother, Antoinette, returns it and tells him not to contact them again. Phil decides that he wants to take time away from Walford to recover from his transplant and he and Sharon decide to go to Italy. Sharon returns two months later without Phil and she informs Michelle that they have bought a holiday apartment in Italy and that he regularly attends Alcoholics Anonymous.

Five months later, when Louise suffers burns from being pushed into lit candles by bullies Alexandra D'Costa (Sydney Craven) and Madison Drake (Seraphina Beh) at her prom party, Ben contacts his father. Phil turns up at the hospital, where he is surprised and unimpressed to find Lisa there already. Sharon and Louise ask Phil to give Lisa a chance. Lisa apologizes to Phil for the past mistakes, regarding Louise and says that they both need to be there for her. Phil appears to oblige at first, but then proceeds to physically throw Lisa out of the hospital – ordering her to stay away from their daughter. Lisa stays with Louise at the hospital and Lisa stands up to Phil, telling him she is not going and Phil allows Lisa to visit Louise. Phil warns Lisa not to mess up. The doctor gives Lisa consent to take Louise outside and Lisa tells Louise she has been discharged. Lisa plans to take Louise, going to Liverpool Street station. Phil and Sharon find Louise's room empty and the doctor reassures them of Lisa and Louise's whereabouts, although they find Louise's belongings gone. Phil is angry as the doctor explains how Louise is at a crucial stage in her recovery and the police tell Phil and Sharon what they are doing. Phil and Sharon are told Lisa switched cabs and find Lisa's flat, which is empty. Louise wakes up and Lisa lies to her that she and Phil agreed for her to be away from the square, while Phil and Sharon question Lisa's capabilities. The police, Phil and Sharon discuss Lisa being traced through her cash withdrawals in Castle Point and that she has a mental health team. Louise is in agony without her medication and Lisa prevents Louise from using the phone by cutting the cord. Louise realises Lisa is not taking her medication. Louise's phone dies as she tries to phone the police and Lisa prevents Louise from leaving, but when Lisa allows her to go, Louise chooses to stay with and comfort Lisa when she is distressed. Bex gives Phil and Sharon information on a hotel where Lisa and Louise are and compared to Sharon, Phil shows a lack of regard to Lisa's mental health. Phil finds Louise but she tells him to leave. Phil gains entry to their room and Lisa hits Phil over the head with a phone. Phil shouts at a struggling Lisa as Louise deteriorates and Lisa and Louise go to hospital together. Louise asks Phil if she could have inherited Lisa's condition and Phil admits his part in causing Lisa's illness. Louise confides in Phil about her guilt of leaving Lisa when she was ill and she rubbishes Phil's belief he is a bad father.

Phil tells Sharon he wants to adopt Dennis. He then receives an offer on the car lot land and confides in Kathy about the guilt he still has over the car lot fire. He tells Sharon that he would provide for Raymond and Aaron and pay off debts if he accepted. Ben signs the paperwork for the garage when Phil decides to hand it over to him and Sharon is left stunned when he decides to give Jay the car lot land, as it is worth more than the garage. Kathy insists to Phil that he justifies his reasons to Ben about giving Jay the car lot land. Ben finds a solicitor's letter of Phil's that mentions Raymond and after confronting Phil, Phil tells Ben that Raymond is his half-brother. Ben is angry with Phil for making him feel second best to his and Sharon's other children. Jay attempts to confront Phil about why he is receiving the car lot and Phil admits he killed his biological father, Jase Dyer, who died in the car lot fire when Phil torched it 23 years previously in an insurance scam. Phil then reveals this to be a lie in a mysterious phone call. Billy confronts Phil over his actions and ends up punching him. Later, Phil is knocked unconscious when the exposed gas line explodes during the Walford in Bloom event – but he is unharmed.

Months later, Ian summons Phil with a request; Kathy's rapist James Willmott-Brown (William Boyde) has returned to Walford. Phil visits Willmott-Brown at his house and warns him to stay away from Kathy. There, Phil discovers Ben's current boyfriend Luke Browning (Adam Astill) is Willmott-Brown's son when he finds a photo of them. Phil tells Kathy of Luke's identity and he warns Luke to stay away from Ben, which backfires as Luke tells Ben about Phil's threat. Ben is left furious at Phil and Kathy is eventually forced to tell Ben that Willmott-Brown has raped her. Phil's former prison cellmate, Aidan Maguire (Patrick Bergin), arrives in Walford and tells Phil that he is planning a robbery and promises to give Phil half of the money if he participates. Phil accepts, and helps Aidan recruit a crew for the heist; Mick and Vincent join the pair along with their new friend, Keanu Taylor (Danny Walters). When Luke beats up Ben as Willmott-Brown has orchestrated, Phil asks Aidan to help scare Luke off. The robbery goes wrong when Mick is shot, and the police arrive. Phil and Aidan hide the stolen money in a coffin in Billy's funeral parlour. However, the money later goes missing. Phil and Aidan try to find the money, unaware that Sharon stole it but was forced to return it to its rightful owner, Aidan's former wife, Ciara Maguire (Denise McCormack). Aidan blames Mick for taking the money but Phil discovers it was Sharon. Aidan threatens Mick's livelihood and his family, and eventually, Phil is convinced to help Mick. After discovering Aidan has been tormenting Mick and his family, Phil punches Aidan and shows him evidence that he killed Luke – which forces Aidan to leave Walford for good.

In 2019, Phil is led to believe by Sharon that she is pregnant with his child. This turns out to be false as Sharon is actually pregnant with Keanu's child, with whom she had an affair with in 2018, which was briefly resumed in 2019, which resulted in Sharon's pregnancy. Keanu is a close associate of Phil and his business, Keanu is also engaged to Louise, who is also pregnant with Keanu's baby. Keanu and Sharon maintained the lie that Sharon's baby is in fact Phil's and not Keanu's. Later in 2019, Phil is told by Lisa that he is not the father of Sharon's baby. Phil, unsure of whom to believe, begins investigating alongside Ben into who is the real father of Sharon's baby. Phil comes to believe that the father is in fact Jack. Because of this, Phil captures and tortures Jack, planning to kill him, but is stopped by Ben and Keanu after realising that Jack is not the father. Phil eventually works out that Keanu is the father of Sharon's baby after he and Sharon tell identical stories regarding a hotel that they could only know if they were together. Phil then swears to have revenge, planning to kill Keanu and confront Sharon. Phil confronts Sharon, letting her know he knows that her baby isn't his and that Keanu is the real father. Ben, who has been blackmailing Martin Fowler, agrees to destroy evidence for him if he kills Keanu for the Mitchells, Martin agrees and Louise helps set Keanu up. Martin, then takes Keanu to a warehouse, where he had to kill him and record himself doing it as proof for the Mitchells. However, Martin cannot go through with it so he and Linda Carter (Kellie Bright) help Keanu fake his death and escape abroad with a new identity.

Following the disappearance of Keanu, due to him faking his death, the Mitchells and Taylors think that Keanu is dead. The police begin investigating Keanu's disappearance and Phil's connection to it. Phil denies any involvement in Keanu's disappearance but later discoverers that Sharon has given the police the video that Martin filmed of Keanu's supposed death. Because of this, Phil flees the country, moving to Portugal with Louise and Lisa.

In February 2020, Keanu returns to the square and captures Ben's boyfriend, Callum Highway (Tony Clay), demanding £100,000 for his freedom. Keanu plans to use this money to flee the country with Sharon, their baby and Dennis. Ben calls Phil to bring the money to pay off Keanu. On finding out Keanu is still alive, Phil goes to kill him himself. The Queen Vic have won a boat party, which the residents of Walford attend. While on board, Phil confronts Keanu with a gun, demanding to know where Callum is and also to confront him about his affair with Sharon. After talking, it appears Keanu has talked Phil out of killing him but when Shirley cannot find Callum in the address Keanu has given, Phil snaps and prepares to kill Keanu. This results in a fight on the deck of the boat, in which the captain is knocked out. The fight spills into the cabin and the wheel of the boat is knocked, steering it into a port in the River Thames causing the boat to crash and sink. Dennis is killed in the boat crash. Ben also loses his hearing after hitting his head in the crash. Keanu escapes after surviving the accident and is last seen leaving his mother Karen and departing the tube station.

Later in the year, Phil attempts to buy back The Queen Vic, wanting to move his family into The Queen Vic after his split with Sharon. However, after seemingly having a deal sorted with Mick, Phil is beaten to the sale by Sharon and Ian. Later in 2020, after Sharon and Phil find out that Ian locked Dennis in a room during the boat crash, they plan their revenge on him. This results in Ian being attacked by an unknown assailant. It is revealed that Phil attacked Ian at Sharon's request, although Ian survived the attack. After this, Sharon attempts to poison Ian, but cannot go through with it. Ian later departs Walford.

In 2021, Phil has been helping Sharon, Sharon wants to rekindle their relationship but Phil is unsure. Phil and Sharon are meant to go on a date, however, Phil backs out instead heading to The Arches where he later tells Sharon he isn't ready yet. After this, it is revealed Kat Slater (Jessie Wallace) is in the Arches, waiting for Phil as they sleep together. Following on from this, Phil tells Sharon they are over forever and begins a secret relationship with Kat.

Phil prepares for his son Ben's marriage to Callum. However, Callum reveals to Ben that he had been collecting evidence on Phil for the police to send Phil down, as a way to keep Ben out of prison for a heist carried out by the Mitchells in 2020. Phil later finds this out and wants revenge on Callum. After being unsure Ben and Callum eventually marry without Phil present, however, Phil later confronts Callum on the square after the wedding about his involvement with the police's plan to take down Phil. After arguing for a while, Kat tries to talk Phil round, until suddenly Whitney Dean (Shona McGarty) attempts to run over Ben as she falsely believes he is responsible for the death of her fiancé Kush Kazemi (Davood Ghadami). Whitney instead accidentally runs over Kat and drives off, after this Phil stays in hospital with Kat until she recovers. When she does, she and Phil make their relationship public, however Phil is now not talking to Ben and Callum. Phil and Kat later buy the launderette and convert the back of it into a taxi rank, as a legacy for both their children. They name the business Kat's Cabs.

In 2022 following over a year of dating Kat and Phil are due to become married. However, Phil is sent to prison after a case by DI Keeble, (who has a vendetta against the Mitchells after Eric Mitchell, Phil's father had killed her father) provided grounds for imprisonment after Phil's former associate Aidan Maguire supplied evidence against Phil. Keeble offers Phil a deal to be released from prison if he becomes a police informant. Phil initially rejects the deal, but eventually agrees to it, faking his death in the prison and being released. Phil then begins working with Keanu Taylor to collect evidence against Keeble to blackmail her into allow Phil to stop being an informant. In January 2023, Phil and Keanu's plan has failed and Keeble begins to take drastic action, kidnapping Phil's fiancé Kat and her son Tommy Moon. Phil and Keanu are able to track down where Keeble is keeping the hostages at gunpoint, in a struggle Kat shoots Keeble with Keeble's gun. Phil then reasons with Keeble, stating he will get her to hospital to save her life if she agrees to drop the vendetta against the Mitchell's, Keeble eventually agrees to this deal and retires from the police force and Phil is a free man.

Throughout 2023, Phil supports his family through Lola Pearce's (Danielle Harold) brain tumour, which results in her death in May 2023. Phil and Kat take a break from their relationship, during which time Phil has sex with Lola's mother Emma Harding (Patsy Kensit). When Phil and Kat reconcile, Emma attempts to blackmail Phil into arranging regular contact between her and their grandchild Lexi Pearce (Isabella Brown); however, he threatens to harm her unless she leaves Walford and never contacts Lexi again. Phil and Kat marry, with Phil helping Sam (played by Medcalf again) settle her debts to the drug baron Camillo when she returns to Walford in November 2023. He later pays off a £50,000 ransom when Sharon's son Albie Watts (Arthur Gentleman) is kidnapped; he soon discovers that Keanu is responsible and reveals this on Christmas Day 2024. When he learns that Albie is his biological son, he demands a place in his life.

In January 2024, Aunt Sal (Anna Karen) dies. At the funeral, Sam learns that Phil is withholding her inheritance. She learns of Phil and Emma's one-night-stand and blackmails Phil into handing over the money; however, she reveals the affair after Phil pays the money regardless. Phil forces Sam to leave Walford, while Kat ends their relationship. Phil takes control of the Arches in the aftermath of Keanu's disappearance in order to cover the ransom demands. When Ben is arrested for fraud offences committed in the US, Phil arranges for Ben to flee with Lexi; this plan is foiled when his family discovers the plan and Ben is eventually extradited. Phil is enraged when Billy's father Stevie Mitchell (Alan Ford) arrives in Walford but is unable to convince the family to reject him. When Stevie is attacked by his grandson Will Mitchell (Freddie Philips) upon discovering Will stole charity money, Phil covers up the attack and frames Stevie for the theft; Phil's scheme is revealed upon the arrival of Teddy Mitchell (Roland Manookian). Billy subsequently disowns Phil, and Phil finds himself isolated from the family after a fight with Teddy's son Harry Mitchell (Elijah Holloway) in the aftermath of Stevie's departure; now isolated from all of his children, Phil descends into a depression.

June 2024, Phil notices Sharon and Linda Carter (Kellie Bright) acting suspicious during Keanu's funeral. He eventually confronts Sharon, who confesses that Linda murdered Keanu and that she and the rest of The Six helped bury the body, before framing Dean Wicks (Matt Di Angelo) for the crime when the body is discovered; Phil uses this information to convince Sharon to give him a bigger role in Albie's life. Sharon has sex with Phil to pacify him, and Phil agrees to help The Six further cover up the crime, though Sharon does not resume their relationship. In September, Phil attends Dean's trial to support The Six, and acts as emotional support for Linda and Sharon after the trial collapses and Sharon's imprisonment for contempt of court, respectively.

In November 2024, Phil sells the nightclub in the aftermath of a crush to Teddy's ex-wife Nicola Mitchell (Laura Doddington). On the night of the nightclub's re-branding event, Nicola discovers the extent of Phil's depression and attempts to force him to relapse in alcoholism, hoping that it will result in Sharon resuming their relationship (as Sharon is now in a relationship with Teddy). Phil ultimately resists the temptation and fails to prevent Linda from relapsing. On Christmas Day 2024, Phil walks out on Christmas dinner with his family, and is shocked to see his and Grant's childhood friend Nigel Bates (Paul Bradley), who is now homeless. Nigel subsequently moves in with Phil and attempts to help him with his depression amid concerns from the rest of the Mitchells.

Phil's mental health begins to decline further after Nigel encourages him to attend Raymond's birthday party; Phil then blames Nigel for the argument and his trust in Nigel begins to weaken. Nigel tricks Phil into attending a double date with him to force him out of his shell; the stress leads Phil to a suicide attempt via car exhaust fumes. After recovering, Phil covers up his suicidal ideation and tells Nigel to leave; in his absence, Phil begins to suffer symptoms of psychotic depression. On the night of Billy and Honey's joint-sten night, Phil suffers hallucinations of his past, where he imagines shooting a younger version of himself before a younger version of Peggy encourages him to commit suicide; this attempt is interrupted by the sudden return of Grant and Nigel. Grant is unconvinced of Phil's troubles and chooses not to address them; Phil then decides to shoot himself on the day of Honey and Billy's wedding but delays his plans until after hearing Lexi's speech. Afterwards, he returns home and is horrified to discover that his gun has been stolen by Cindy Beale (Michelle Collins); he sets out to recover it, during which time Linda discovers suicide notes Phil has left for his family. Linda subsequently informs Nigel and Grant and the three find Phil at the garage but are relieved when the gun is unloaded. An emotional Grant storms off but Phil is encouraged to seek help for his thoughts by both Linda and Nigel, who reveals he has dementia; Phil voluntarily enters a mental health institution as a result. Grant and Nigel later visit him, where an upset Phil rebuffs Grant's efforts to rebuild their relationship and declares that he's dead to him; despite this, the two reconcile shortly before Grant departs Walford. Inside the mental health institution, Phil befriends Gaz, and after saving Gaz's life after a suicide attempt, Phil is encouraged to accept the support of his family, which he does upon his release.

Nigel's condition slowly begins to deteriorate and Phil is horrified when he learns of Nigel's intentions to end his life before it gets worse; he subsequently agrees to care for Nigel on the condition he doesn't send Nigel to a home. Phil soon becomes overwhelmed (which is exacerbated when he learns Callum has begun a relationship with Linda's son Johnny Carter in Ben's absence. Fearing for Phil's wellbeing, Jay invites Nigel's wife Julie Bates (Karen Henthorn) to Walford, infuriating Phil as Nigel had explicitly stated he didn't want Julie to see him in such a condition. Julie quickly decides to take Nigel back to their home in Scotland but quickly returns Nigel to Walford after he runs away. Julie moves in with Phil to help care for Nigel and despite initially feuding, the two eventually become friendly. Upon Ben being transferred back to England, Phil supports him after the breakdown of his marriage to Callum before going to visit Louise in Portugal. Upon his return, he supports Nigel after his involvement in a car crash which injured Gina Knight (Francesca Henry) and Jasmine Fisher (Indeyarna Donaldson-Holness). Phil is enraged when he learns that Sam has returned and taken advantage of Nigel's condition by posing as his daughter Clare to defraud him but allows her to move in with him after he learns she has been diagnosed with breast cancer. Nigel begins to become violent and Julie considers placing Nigel in a care home, much to Phil's chagrin, but after Nigel briefly goes missing shortly before Christmas, Nigel allows Phil to renege on his promise. Phil subsequently leads the Mitchells in holding a final Christmas for Nigel.

== Reception ==
=== Popularity ===
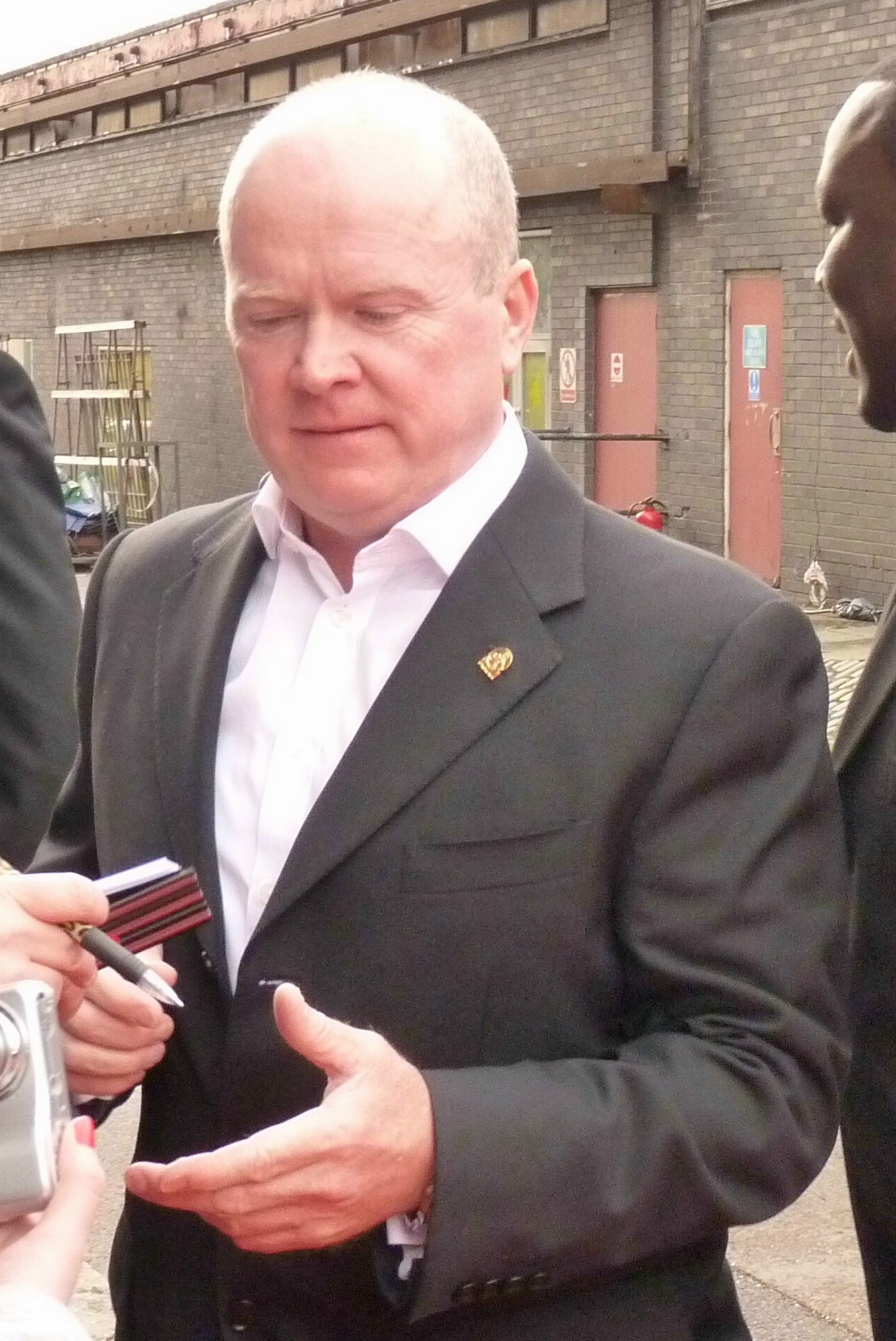
Steve McFadden (pictured) was awarded the "Outstanding Achievement" award at The British Soap Awards, for his role as Phil.

The character of Phil is arguably one of the soap's most popular, particularly with female viewers, making him one of the soap's unlikeliest sex symbols. He has featured in some of the show's most highly viewed storylinesand is the second longest running male character to appear in the soap, surpassed only by Ian Beale (Adam Woodyatt). Phil along with Grant was voted as the second most popular King of Soaps in a Channel 4 poll in 2002.

During a period of heavy media criticism aimed at EastEnders throughout 2004 and 2005, the character—who was on a hiatus from the show—was reintroduced twice in what was branded by the press as a bid to "boost flagging Enders." His first return in April 2005 was generally well-received, with media comments such as "the excellent, bug-eyed Steve McFadden proves nobody does psychotic thug better than him" and "McFadden's blistering performance on Tuesday defies that old cliché of a soap being bigger than its stars". Of the Mitchell brothers' highly publicised return in October 2005, a reporter from the Daily Mirror commented "Soapville must confess that we did get goosebumps and feel properly excited when we first saw the Mitchell Brothers back on the Square...After all, you associate them with the golden days of Enders".

In addition the character has been praised for being good value, realistic, consistent within his character and convincing.

In 2009, Phil Mitchell came second in a poll by British men's magazine Loaded for 'Top Soap Bloke'. In 2011 McFadden was nominated for 'Best Actor' at The British Soap Awards 2011 for playing Phil. as well as be nominated at the Inside Soap Awards for 'Best Actor' in 2011. On Digital Spy's 2012 end of year reader poll, McFadden was nominated for "Best Male Soap Actor" and came fourth with 10.7% of the vote.

In 2016, McFadden was honoured at The British Soap Awards when he was awarded "Outstanding Achievement' for his portrayal of Phil.

Phil is a consistent and central character in the satirical McFadden's Cold War collages by Cold War Steve.

=== Criticism ===
Although popular with many, the character has also garnered much criticism over the years. In November 2005 the character was blamed for turning children into playground bullies by Dr. Sophie Henry, who claimed that impressionable children look to male soap characters as role models and subsequently copy their violent behaviour. Indeed, the character's violent behaviour evoked concern from viewers in October 2002. A scene in which Phil beat his godson, Jamie Mitchell (Jack Ryder) was criticised for being too realistic by TV watchdogs. The Broadcasting Standards Commission upheld 31 complaints from viewers, saying that the scenes were too strong for a programme shown before the 9pm watershed. In April 2005, Following Phil's return to Walford while on the run, scenes of the character violently attacking Ian Beale and attempting to force money from him and Phil's physical altercation with numerous police officers sparked viewer complaints. The BBC were then force to edit down the scenes in repeats of the episode to tone down the impact of the violence.

A certain level of criticism was aimed at the character due to the stark personality change he underwent circa 2000. One reporter commented "Formerly the milder-mannered sibling, Phil has gone from Abel to Cain without an intervening period of plausibility. And it doesn't suit him". His violent tendencies have also been spoofed by the television series 2DTV. There were mixed reviews for the highly publicised storyline (dubbed Get Johnny Week) involving the Mitchell brothers reunion in 2006. It was criticised as "patchy" and "awkwardly written...unveiling a common weakness in the EastEnders camp, that character continuity can often fall by the wayside when you are dealing with larger characters". Additionally, the show was criticised for turning the brothers into a comical farce by incorporating uncharacteristic humour into their dialect, which was described as "cringeworthy".

In August 2010, scenes showing Phil and Rainie taking crack cocaine prompted over 200 complaints from viewers who felt the scenes were inappropriate. The BBC responded by saying "EastEnders in no way – and at no point – glamorises or condones the use of drugs, and furthermore we took great care to avoid any demonstration on how to prepare or take drugs. We feel that Phil's decline will highlight the destructive nature of drugs, and rather than encourage drug use, will act as a deterrent."

Angie Quinn from MyLondon wrote in 2021 that Phil "can normally be seen wandering around the streets with an expression similar to a bulldog chewing a wasp.".

== See also ==
- List of soap opera villains
- List of EastEnders: E20 characters
- "Who Shot Phil?"
- "Sharongate"
- "Who Killed Archie?"
- "Queen Vic Fire Week"
- "Who Killed Lucy Beale?"
- "Get Johnny Week"
