= Annie Palmer =

Annie Palmer may refer to:

- Annie Palmer (EastEnders)
- Annie Palmer (White Witch of Rose Hall)
