= Nadia Sawalha =

British actress and television personality (born 1964)

- Born: 18 November 1964 (age 61); Wandsworth, London, England
- Education: Italia Conti Academy of Theatre Arts
- Occupations: Actress; television personality; YouTuber
- Years active: 1982–2026
- Notable work: EastEnders; Loose Women
- Spouses: Justin Mildwater (m. 1992; died 1997) Mark Adderley (m. 2002)
- Children: 2
- Father: Nadim Sawalha
- Relatives: Julia Sawalha (sister); Nabil Sawalha (uncle)

Nadia Sawalha (/səˈwəlxə/; born 18 November 1964) is an English actress, television personality, writer, TV cook and vlogger. She is best known as a long-term regular panellist on the ITV daytime talk show Loose Women, being one of the original panellists from its start in 1999 until 2002, before returning to the show in 2013 after a panellist revamp. She played the role of Gina in the ITV comedy Second Thoughts from 1992 to 1994, and Annie Palmer on the BBC One soap opera EastEnders from 1997 to 1999. She has also had minor roles in The Bill, Casualty, Benidorm and 99-1. Sawalha presented a number of television programmes in the early 2000s, whilst taking a break from Loose Women.

Sawalha won the 2007 series of Celebrity MasterChef. She has been cooking with her sister Dina on YouTube since January 2023.

== Early life ==
Sawalha was raised and still lives in Croydon, south London. She is the daughter of the Jordanian-born British actor Nadim Sawalha and his English wife Roberta Lane. Nadia is the sister of television actress Julia Sawalha and has appeared on Lily Savage's Blankety Blank with her. In 1997, the three starred together in Dearest Daddy... Darling Daughter at the Young Vic Theatre in London. However, the family pulled out of the performance after hearing of Nadia's husband's death.

== Career ==
After training at the Italia Conti Academy of Theatre Arts, Sawalha began her career in theatre. From 1997 to 1999, she starred in EastEnders as businesswoman Annie Palmer. Her other acting television credits include Casualty, Which Way to the War, The Vanishing Man (1996), the BBC Victorian drama Station Jim (2001) and the ITV police drama The Bill. Sawalha has also appeared in the films Clockwise (1986), Slave of Dreams (1995), and the straight-to-video release Caught in the Act (1997).

From 1999 to 2002, Sawalha was a regular panellist on the lunchtime chat show Loose Women. She returned in October 2013 and has appeared during most weeks in the last decade.

In 2001, Sawalha presented the short-lived ITV quiz programme It's Not the Answer, with Peter Dickinson as the announcer.

For the BBC, Sawalha has fronted four series of Passport to the Sun, one series each of Total, TV Mail, Heir Hunters, Perfect Partner and Family Exchange. She was also a co-host on the live documentary City Hospital. She has previously hosted the BBC One show Living in the Sun, about British expats living in Spain, and Wanted Down Under, which shows families who want to make the move Down Under (Australia, occasionally New Zealand) and what it would be like to live and work in those Antipodean nations. She could also be seen on Accidents Can Happen, a daytime BBC One programme produced by Twofour, which follows families as they try to rebuild their homes and their lives following disaster.

In 2005, Sawalha presented one series of the BBC One programme Mirror, Signal, Manoeuvre which followed learner drivers as they learnt to drive and took their driving tests with varying degrees of success. Sawalha was one of the learner drivers who ended up passing her driving test at the end of the second series. That year, and on the same network, Sawalha also co-presented with Jeremy Milnes for one series of the programme Keeping Up with the Joneses.

In the summer of 2006, Sawalha began co-presenting The One Show with Adrian Chiles. However, due to her pregnancy, she did not return to the show in the summer of 2007, and was replaced by Christine Bleakley.

After winning Celebrity MasterChef, Sawalha went on to co-present the children's version of the show Junior Masterchef; she was said to be 'delighted' to be given the chance to host the show. From the 2012 series, Sawalha was replaced by Irish cook Donal Skehan.

In 2008, Sawalha returned to BBC One to present the daytime programme Wanted Down Under. She presented the 2009 programme Eating in the Sun, produced by her husband Mark Adderley, in which Sawalha is challenged by celebrity chefs to cook in their favourite holiday restaurants.

From 15 February until 20 August 2010, Sawalha presented a series of the reality programme Instant Restaurant for BBC Two.

In July 2011, Sawalha guest presented the ITV Breakfast programme Lorraine and made a total of 17 appearances on the show as a relief presenter and resident chef.

In January 2011, Sawalha starred in the sixth series of ITV's Dancing on Ice with Scottish professional Mark Hanretty, but was voted out in a double elimination in the first week, along with Angela Rippon and her partner Sean Rice.

In April 2012, she began co-presenting Saturday Cookbook on ITV Breakfast with chef Mark Sargeant. The same year, Sawalha presented the UKTV Home series Kitchen SOS.

From 27 October to 29 December 2013, Sawalha and Kaye Adams co-hosted a series of Sunday Scoop, a cookery show.

From 7 January 2015, Sawalha took part in the fifteenth series of Celebrity Big Brother on Channel 5. She lasted 24 days in the house before being evicted.

Sawalha presented her own cookery show, Nadia's Family Feasts, on ITV. She took inspiration from busy households around the world as she searched for new ideas for recipes that would fit into hectic schedules. Each week, she was joined by a guest chef with a passion or expertise in that cuisine. The series lasted for one season and was replaced by John and Lisa's Weekend Kitchen.

Sawalha now hosts a podcast with her husband. In How to Stay Married (So Far), they talk about the ups and downs of married life.

== YouTube ==
The Sawalha-Adderleys
- Born: Nadia Sawalha; 18 November 1964 (age 61); Mark Adderley; 20 November 1970 (age 55)
- Occupations: TV presenter, actress (Nadia); Camera man (Mark)

YouTube information
- Channel: YouTube channel
- Years active: 2014–present
- Genres: Trailer Reviews; Teaser Trailer Reviews; Film Reviews; Coffee Moaning; Cooking; ADHD Diary
- Subscribers: 138 thousand
- Views: 61.6 million
- Last updated: 10 December 2021
- Website: www.doghouse-media.co.uk

Sawalha started a YouTube channel with fellow Loose Women panellist Kaye Adams. They had their own YouTube platform, Instagram account and Facebook page, in which they did weekly vlogs, cooking videos, film and TV programme reviews. They also focused on daily normal family routines as well. This account, however, is now inactive.

Sawalha also launched a Sawalha-Adderley YouTube channel. The Sawalha-Adderleys (Originally Nadia Sawalha and Family) on Monday 25 August 2014, featuring Sawalha with her husband Mark Adderley. Also regularly appearing are Adderley's mother Diane Adderley and Sawalha's sister Dina.

The channel began as a film and TV show review in which Sawalha, Adderley and occasionally their children would review films coming out in the cinema, or a popular TV show on television. However, by the end of 2014, her family decided to make varied content with the first being Vlogmas where the family do a vlog every day in December. This proved to be a hit with their followers. From 2015 onwards, the channel has been releasing at least two videos daily, but their children no longer appear in their content.

In December 2016, the channel launched a subscription service. It had a monthly cost of £1.99 and included their weekly The No-Named Sunday show which features different segments from memes, cooking, newspapers, book reviews, Teddy Talks, and an occasional livestream for members only.

In February 2019, the channel reached 50,000 subscribers. On 4 May 2020, the channel reached 100,000 subscribers and received a "silver play button".

== Personal life ==
On Christmas Day 1997, Sawalha's first husband, Justin Mildwater's body was discovered. The inquest subsequently heard that there were "traces of cocaine and cannabis in his blood and he had been drinking". The Coroner, Dr William Dolman, recorded an open verdict on the death, as he could not be sure of the deceased motives. The couple had been married for five years, but had split up a few months before. On 6 June 2002, she married her second husband, Mark Adderley. The following year, he was caught on the M4 near Chippenham with twice the legal level of alcohol in his blood to legally drive. Adderley has been sober following a period of rehabilitation. Both Sawalha and Adderley have discussed his path to sobriety on their YouTube channel. The couple live in Upper Norwood, south London, and have two daughters.

Sawalha has suffered from psoriasis, and has used homeopathy rather than conventional treatment. In 2019, Sawalha revealed on Loose Women that she suffers from tinnitus. On 31 May 2017, Sawalha spoke in an emotional video online about losing her hair at the age of 52. Sawalha said that her curls were fake and she was going through the perimenopause, the start of the menopause. She said that a doctor told her in September 2016 she had the balding gene. On 25 November 2022, Sawalha announced on Loose Women that she had been diagnosed with ADHD at the age of 58. Sawalha is an atheist.

In the wake of the Gaza war, Sawalha has been a vocal advocate for Palestine, and a critic of Israel. In July 2026, Sawalha and Adderley received an apology, substantial libel damages and legal costs from the Daily Mail and Metro publisher over false allegations that suggested the couple showed "support for terrorism or hatred of Jews". The following month, she threatened legal action against ITV, claiming that they had dropped her from Loose Women for speaking out in favour of Palestinian rights. A group of Jewish entertainment industry executives had sent a dossier to the network, urging them not to bring Sawalha back; they cited "repeated examples of conspiratorial rhetoric, inflammatory commentary, disinformation, and antisemitic discourse". She stated that she has not been given a chance to see the document and respond to the claims, but has denied antisemitism. The European Legal Support Center, which advocates for pro-Palestinian cases, has written to ITV on her behalf; they allege discrimination owing to her "anti-Zionist beliefs, which are protected under the Equality Act 2010".

== Filmography ==
Year	Title	Role	Notes
1986	Clockwise	Mandy Kostakis	Supporting role
1989–1992	Oxo adverts	Son's Girlfriend	3 adverts
1992	Bottom	Receptionist (Uncredited)	1 Episode (Deleted scene)
1992–1994	Second Thoughts	Gina	Recurring role (4 episodes)
1993	True Crimes	Lucy	1 Episode
1994	Which Way to the War	Lucia	Supporting Role
1994	The Bill	Barbara	1 Episode ("Indecent Exposure")
1995	Solomon & Sheba	1st Prostitute	Minor role
1995	99-1	Arabella	Recurring role (2 episodes)
1995	Slave of Dreams	Ankh	Supporting role
1996	Casualty	Dr. Robyn McCormack	1 episode ("Another Day in Paradise")
1996	Bottom Fluff	Herself	Interviewee
1996	Viz Top Tips	Airport Assistant	Supporting role
1997	The Vanishing Man	Catherine	TV movie
1997	Caught in the Act	Amanda	TV movie
1997–1999	EastEnders	Annie Palmer	Series regular (168 episodes)
1999–2002, 2013–2026	Loose Women	Herself	Regular panellist, Guest Anchor
2000	Soap Fever	Herself	Presenter
2001	Station Jim	Rosa	Supporting role
2001	It's Not the Answer	Herself	Presenter
2001–2002	Passport to the Sun	Herself	Presenter
2002–2006	City Hospital	Herself	Recurring presenter
2003	Celebrity Driving School	Herself	Presenter
2004–2006	Accidents Can Happen	Herself	Presenter
2005	Mirror, Signal, Manoeuvre	Herself	Presenter
2005	Keeping up with the Joneses	Herself	Presenter
2006–2007	The One Show	Herself	Presenter (17 episodes)
2007	Celebrity MasterChef	Herself	Contestant (Winner)
2007	Heir Hunters	Herself	Presenter (15 Episodes)
2007–2009	Wanted Down Under	Herself	Presenter (5 episodes)
2010–2012	Junior MasterChef	Herself	Presenter/Judge (7 episodes)
2010–2013	The Wright Stuff	Herself	Panellist (10 episodes)
2011	Dancing on Ice	Herself	Contestant (1 episode)
2011–2012	Daybreak	Herself	Relief presenter (53 episodes)
2011–2018	Lorraine	Herself	Relief presenter/chef (17 episodes)
2012	Kitchen SOS	Herself	Presenter
2012	Saturday Cookbook	Herself	Presenter
2013	Sunday Scoop	Herself	Presenter
2014	The Masseuse	Spa Receptionist	Main role
2015	Benidorm	Melanie	Recurring role (2 episodes)
2015	Celebrity Big Brother	Herself	Celebrity Housemate
2017	Celebrity Juice	Herself	Panellist (1 Episode)
2019	Nadia's Family Feasts	Herself	Presenter
2019	Peaky Bleeders	Period Gang Leader	Main role
2021	The Celebrity Circle	Herself	Contestant (3 episodes)
2022	London Live News	Herself	Presenter (1 episode)

=== Video games ===
Year	Title	Role	Notes
1996	Privateer 2: The Darkening	Temessa Ames	Main role (voiceover)

== Theatre credits ==
Year	Title	Role	Notes
1997	Dearest Daddy...Darling	Daughter	Young Vic Theatre
1999–2000	Aladdin	The Princess	Ashcroft Theatre, Croydon

== Bibliography ==
- Stuffed Vine Leaves Saved My Life (2010) Doubleday, London.
- Greedy Girl's Diet (2013) Kyle, London.
- Greedy Girl's Diet: Second Helpings! (2013) Kyle Books, London.
- Fabulous Family Food (2014) Macmillan, London.
- Little Black Dress Diet (2016) Kyle Books, London.
- Nadia and Kaye: Disaster Chef (2018) – with Kaye Adams. Dorling Kindersley Limited, London.
- Parent Alert!: How to Keep Your Kids Safe Online (2018) – with Kaye Adams and Will Geddes. Dorling Kindersley Limited, London.
- Honey, I Homeschooled the Kids (2021) – with Mark Adderley. Coronet, London.

== See also ==
- List of Celebrity Big Brother (British TV series) housemates
- List of Dancing on Ice contestants
