= Annie Palmer (EastEnders) =

Fictional character from BBC soap opera EastEnders

- EastEnders character
- Portrayed by: Nadia Sawalha
- Duration: 1997–1999
- First appearance: Episode 1446; 6 May 1997
- Last appearance: Episode 1790; 10 June 1999
- Introduced by: Jane Harris
In-universe information
- Occupation: Business manager
- Father: George Palmer
- Mother: Alison Palmer

Annie Palmer is a fictional character from the BBC soap opera EastEnders, played by Nadia Sawalha, from 6 May 1997 to 10 June 1999.

== Casting ==
Nadia Sawalha spoke in an interview with Larry Jaffee about how she got the role of Annie, saying that she auditioned with many other actresses. She got through to the screen test with Victoria Gould, who played Polly Becker. Sawalha has said that the only two they screen-tested were her and Victoria Gould: "We were always going to get the job. They hadn’t decided which way they were going to go (who was going to be Annie and who Polly). They always have a vague idea of they want sic, and then they build the character around the person they choose. I was pleased when they turned it around." She also said she enjoyed playing "such a devilsome lady". Sawalha originally believed she may not be right for EastEnders, explaining, "My father is Arabic and my mother English. I just thought that I was too exotic – that there wasn't enough call for a foreigner.” In September 1998, it was reported that Sawalha had quit the role.

== Storylines ==
When Annie arrived in Albert Square in 1997, she is believed to be a former business associate of George Palmer (Paul Moriarty). Together they open a print shop called "By The Letter" to cover their illegal deals, but Grant Mitchell (Ross Kemp) catches them hugging. Grant's mother Peggy Mitchell (Barbara Windsor) is dating George, so Grant tells her what he has seen; when Peggy confronts George, he tells her that Annie is his daughter. Annie takes over George's nightclub, The Cobra Club, renames it The Market Cellar, and uses it to facilitate her money-laundering operations and illegal gambling. Like her father, Annie is well-connected in the business world; the Palmer name also carries serious clout in the underworld. Annie soon builds herself a small business empire in Albert Square. She gets most of the local council on side and she is instrumental in helping Ian Beale (Adam Woodyatt) run for a council seat. She owns a significant share of the Walford Health Club with Grant, and starts a loan-shark business with his brother Phil (Steve McFadden), not to mention her continuous dealing in money-laundering scams.

Annie is shrewd and smart and completely averse to showing any emotion, which comes from a desperate need to prove that she can cut it in a male-dominated business. She wants to show her father that she can do her job as good as, if not better than, any man. But Annie's tough exterior masks a hidden vulnerability, so she rarely allows men to get close to her. She has flings with Conor Flaherty (Seán Gleeson) (her loan-shark 'heavy') and Phil at the same time, and relishes watching them compete against each other for her affections. She later becomes close to her childhood friend Gianni di Marco (Marc Bannerman), but when they look likely to embark on a serious relationship, Annie's father drops the bombshell that Gianni may be his son. It is revealed that George had had an affair with Gianni's mother Rosa (Louise Jameson) behind Rosa's husband's back, and Gianni's paternity is unknown. The realisation that he could have been having an incestuous relationship with Annie devastates Gianni, and he cuts all ties with both George and Annie. Blood tests later confirm that George isn't Gianni's father, which devastates him as he has always longed for a son who would inherit the family business. Seeing her father's devastation, Annie shows some rare emotion and tells him she'd always sensed his desperation for a son and that is why she'd always strived so hard to prove her worth. Unable to deal with Annie's emotion, George leaves England in 1998, leaving Annie to run their businesses on her own.

Annie's loan-shark business hits a setback in 1999, when she dabbles on the turf of a rival business gang. Refusing to cede after receiving threats, she is beaten nearly to death by the gang's heavies. Although she shows a brave front, her confidence is severely undermined. Annie later becomes involved with fellow businessman Steve Owen (Martin Kemp); the two are locked in a cat-and-mouse game of one-upmanship with each other. He manages to get through her prickly defences, and even manages to buy her nightclub, which he renames The E20. Annie hears news her father has been arrested in New Zealand for tax evasion so she turns to Steve for support and comfort, but he rejects her, leaving her humiliated. To get back at him, she sells her health-club shares to Grant instead of him, but it is a hollow victory and in June 1999 she leaves Walford. She lives with her father in New Zealand, where his import/export business is based.

== Reception ==
Author Kate Lock described her as "a rather terrifying creation, a kind of dominatrix without the dungeon. A verbal Miss Whiplash, she tore strips off anyone who crosses her." The BBC described her as a 'tough-nut business woman'. She was also described as 'tough' and 'steel'. She was voted by What's on TV as the 85 sexiest soap sirens of all time out of 100. When Nadia announced her decision to leave, it was described by Daily Mirror as a "real shock", adding that "scheming Annie" had proved to be "one of the most watchable in recent years".
