= Nadim Sawalha =

British-Jordanian actor (born 1933)

- Born: 9 September 1933 (age 93); Madaba, Emirate of Transjordan (present-day Jordan)
- Occupation: Actor
- Years active: 1964–present
- Spouse: Roberta Lane (m. 1961)
- Children: 3, including Nadia and Julia Sawalha
- Relatives: Nabil Sawalha (brother)

Nadim Joakim Sawalha (Arabic: نديم صوالحة; born 9 September 1933) is a Jordanian-British actor. He has made over 100 appearances in film and television, in a career spanning more than 40 years, which include two James Bond films, The Spy Who Loved Me (1977) and The Living Daylights (1987). He is the father of actresses Nadia and Julia Sawalha.

== Early life ==
Sawalha was born in Madaba, Jordan, in 1933 and moved to the United Kingdom in the early 1950s to study drama. His daughter Julia revealed on her episode of Who Do You Think You Are? that he is uncertain of his birth date, but it is thought to be around 7 to 9 September. His brother is comedian Nabil Sawalha.

== Personal life ==
Sawalha is married to Roberta Mary Lane, and has three daughters, including Nadia and Julia.

== Filmography ==
=== Film ===
Year	Title	Role	Notes
1973	Yellow Dog	An Arab pilot	
1973	A Touch of Class	Night Hotel Manager	
1974	Callan	Padilla	
1974	The Bunny Caper	Abdur	aka Sex Play
1974	Gold	A member of the Syndicate	
1974	Vampira	An airline representative	
1975	The Wind and the Lion	The Sherif of Wazan	
1975	The Return of the Pink Panther	Museum guide	
1977	Are You Being Served?	The Emir's Interpreter	
1977	Sweeney!	Chairman of the Oil Producers' Conference	
1977	Sinbad and the Eye of the Tiger	Hassan	
1977	The Spy Who Loved Me	Aziz Fekkesh	
1980	The Awakening	Dr El Sadek	
1981	Göta kanal eller Vem drog ur proppen?	Sheikh Kahlifa bin Hirscham al Saba	
1985	Young Sherlock Holmes	Egyptian tavern owner	
1986	Half Moon Street (film)	Karim Hatami	
1987	The Living Daylights	Tangier police chief	
1991	Company Business	Faisal	
2005	Syriana	Emir Hamad Al-Subaai	
2006	The Nativity Story	Melchior	
2007	Whatever Lola Wants	Adham	
2008	Captain Abu Raed	Abu Raed	
2010	West Is West	Pir Naseem	
2015	The Rendezvous	Professor Al Ahmad	
2018	Tel Aviv on Fire	Bassem	

=== Television ===
Year	Title	Role	Notes
1976	Space: 1999	Zoran	Episode: "The Immunity Syndrome"
1976	The Sweeney	Captain Shebbeq	Episode: "Visiting Fireman"
1976	Survivors	Amul	Episodes: "Lights of London", parts 1 & 2
1977	The Professionals	Sheikh Achmeia	Episode: "Long Shot"
1978	The Professionals	Arab Diplomat	Episode: "First Night"
1979	The Knowledge	Arab Man	
1979	Minder	Sardi	Episode: "A Tethered Goat", Series 1
1981	Juliet Bravo	Mr. Hamid	Episode: "The Third Man"
1981–1982	Sorry, I'm A Stranger Here Myself	Mumtaz	
1984	Bergerac	Zaki Mansoor	Episode: "A Touch Of Eastern Promise" Season 3 Episode 6
1985	Open All Hours	Mr. Gupta	Episode: "Horse-Trading"
1988	Tales of the Unexpected	Zayid	Episode (9/8): "The Finger of Suspicion"
1990	House of Cards	Bank Manager	Episode 1
1993–2006	The Bill	Multiple	Episode: "Part of the Family" (1993) Mr. Said Episode: "Nice Boy" (1996) Hussein Bakri; Episode: "To Catch a Cobra" (1999) Amit Roy; Episode: "On the Wagon" (2000) Viviek Gupta; Episode: "461: Go For Gold" (2006) Rafi Nadir
1995–1998	Dangerfield	Dr. Shaaban Hamada	
2000	Cleopatra	Mardian	
2000	Arabian Nights	Judge Zadic	
2002	The Last Cavalier		
2003	Lawrence of Arabia: The Battle for the Arab World	Narrator	PBS
2007	Diana: Last Days of a Princess	Mohammed Al-Fayed	Docudrama
2007	Robin Hood	Bassam	Episode: "We Are Robin Hood"
2008	House of Saddam	King Hussein	
2011	The Hour	Naguib Hafiz	Episode #1.2

=== Other roles ===
- He played the part of Omar Badri in the BBC's CDX computer game.
- In the 2018 BBC Radio 4 miniseries A Tale of Two Cities: Aleppo and London, he played the role of Dr. Mahmoud.
