= Accidents Can Happen =

British television series

Accidents Can Happen is a television series produced by Twofour, which was broadcast on daytime BBC One in three series from 2004 to 2006.

Presented by Nadia Sawalha, Accidents Can Happen follows what happens when disaster strikes a home – from floods and fires to crashes and explosions. Sawalha meets families as they pick up the pieces and navigate the process of re-building their homes. The stories featured in the show include families caught up in the Carlisle floods, a family business destroyed in the 2004 Boscastle flood and people who have lost everything in horrific fires.

== Reception ==
The programme received mostly negative reviews from critics. Kim Bunce in The Observer described it as "the most boring piece of programme-making yet to come out of the BBC". A reviewer in The Northern Echo wrote it was "awful", particularly the frequent recaps, stating that "the makers seem to think viewers at this time are unable to remember facts for very long". Nadia Sawalha was later critical of the programme, stating in a 2012 interview: "I depressed myself just being on it, let alone watching it".

The programme, however, was popular with daytime audiences, leading to a further two series being commissioned.
