= Nabil Sawalha =

Jordanian comedian (born 1941)

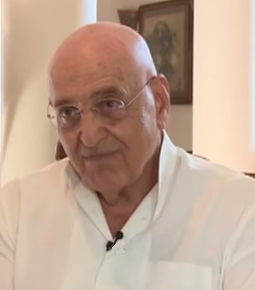

Nabil Sawalha (Arabic: نبيل صوالحة) is a Jordanian actor, born near the city of Madaba in 1941. His family, especially his mother, encouraged him and his brother Nadim Sawalha, a British actor, to pursue a career in acting, which was not a normal career path in Jordan at the time. Sawalha began his theatre career by acting in BBC radio plays in 1950s while studying engineering in the UK. In 1962, he returned to Jordan and joined the Jordanian National Theatre Group. In 1968, Sawalha formed his own production company, Urdon Co., and began producing series for local and regional Arab networks, such as Tamara.

== Career ==
Sawalha's major breakthrough came in 1980 with his own television series, Beinee wa Beinak (Between me and you). In 1990, Sawalha met Hisham Yanes, a former colleague from the Jordanian National Theatre Group, who returned to Jordan from Kuwait and the two were urged to collaborate. The duo was formed in an era of democratization and liberalization in the kingdom, allowing them to push boundaries beyond previous limits, Sawalha noted. Their first television programme, Ahlan Nabil and Hisham, was aired in the winter of 1991, and the pair began the annual tradition of launching a new play every Ramadan.

In 1992, the pair staged a play that was described by some critics as one of their most daring works.: Hello Arab Summits. All modern Arab leaders were lampooned in the wide-ranging piece, which covered periods between 1964 and the 1991 Gulf War.

Another turning point in Jordan's history became yet another milestone in Sawalha's career when the Kingdom signed the 1994 Wadi Araba Peace Treaty. That year the comedy duo (Nabeel &Hisham) came out with Peace oh Peace, a play satirizing wars in the region. In 1995, they performed in Israel and the Palestinian occupied territories. The tour prompted a short-lived blacklisting of the duo's theatrical performances in Jordan, and stirred criticism from the Jordanian Anti-Normalization Committee.

In 1997, after six years with seven successful plays and several television series, Sawalha went back to England for four years, during which he produced two plays focusing on Arab-Americans in UK: Hello Arabs of London and Divided Hearts, before returning to Amman in 2001. After 2001, Sawalha made several appearances on MBC pan-Arab TV. He also collaborated with Kharabeesh, which produced several stand-up comedy video clips for him.

== Awards ==
Sawalha has won several awards: the Medal of Independence 1st class from King Hussein for achievements in the arts, the Pioneer Shield from the Artists' Association of Jordan; and the Shields and Certificates of Appreciation from local and international institutions, for spreading tolerance and inter-cultural understanding.
