= List of EastEnders characters introduced in 1996 =

EastEnders logo

The following is a list of fictional characters that first appeared in the BBC soap opera EastEnders in 1996, by order of first appearance.

== Michael Rose ==
Michael Rose
- EastEnders character
- Portrayed by: Russell Floyd
- Duration: 1996–1999
- First appearance: Episode 1251; 15 February 1996
- Last appearance: Episode 1874; 9 December 1999
In-universe information
- Occupation: Market inspector
- Mother: Mrs Rose
- Brothers: Colin Rose
- Wife: Susan Rose
- Sons: Matthew Rose

Michael Rose, played by Russell Floyd, first appears in Walford as a Market Inspector in 1996. He initially has very few storylines, but he is chosen to be the best man at Terry Raymond (Gavin Richards)'s wedding (which is later called off). He has a crush on April Branning (Debbie Arnold) but no relationship ever develops between them. Then there is the arrival of his teenage son Matthew (Joe Absolom) and former wife Susan Rose (Tilly Vosburgh) in 1997.

His ex-wife Susan is suffering from multiple sclerosis and Michael ends up caring for her. Eventually he and Susan get back together and seem happy until the arrival of Lisa Shaw (Lucy Benjamin) who is also a Market Inspector. He and Lisa become attracted to each other and have an affair behind Susan's back. Michael ends the affair and decides to leave Walford with Susan and start a new life in Leeds, with Susan unaware of the affair.

He returns occasionally in 1999 when his son Matthew is wrongly imprisoned for the murder of Saskia Duncan (Deborah Sheridan-Taylor). Michael's last appearance is in December 1999, visiting Matthew in prison.

== Dan Zappieri ==
Dan Zappieri
- EastEnders character
- Portrayed by: Carl Pizzie
- Duration: 1996–1997
- First appearance: Episode 1265; 19 March 1996
- Last appearance: Episode 1394; 7 January 1997
In-universe information
- Occupation: Drug dealer

Dan Zappieri, played by Carl Pizzie, made his first screen appearance on 19 March 1996. Pizzie was out of work and had just opened a bar with fellow actor Nick Pickard when he was cast as Dan. EastEnders was his first major television role. Pizzie relished the chance to play a bad guy role, as he had only ever played "regular guys" before.

Dan was a drug dealer, who befriended Tony Hills (Mark Homer). They sold drugs together and Pizzie commented that Tony was easily drawn into Dan's world as he thought it was exciting and he liked having money. When two of Dan's customers suffered serious side effects from his drugs, he was unconcerned and Pizzie noted that all Dan cared about was money. He said "He likes playing the bad guy, he thinks his life is a bit like an Al Pacino movie." Pizzie found parts of Dan's storylines challenging to play, as he did not touch drugs. But he liked that the show was tackling the subject matter and the negative effects taking drugs had on people. An Inside Soap columnist branded the character "Desperate Dan" and "Walford's latest villain".

== Aunt Sal ==
Aunt Sal is played by Anna Karen, and has appeared sporadically since 21 March 1996, usually for only one or two episodes at a time. She is Peggy Mitchell's (Barbara Windsor) sister.

== Ben Mitchell ==
Ben Mitchell has been played by six different actors. Matthew Silver appeared as an infant Ben from 1996 to 1998, and Morgan Whittle played him as a toddler from 1999 to 2000. After a six-year absence from the series, Charlie Jones assumed the role of Ben in 2006. Executive producer Bryan Kirkwood axed Jones as part of a series revamp in 2010; the role was recast to Joshua Pascoe later that year. Pascoe portrayed Ben until 24 August 2012, when he was sent to prison for the murder of Heather Trott (Cheryl Fergison). Ben returned to the serial in September 2014, with the role recast to Harry Reid, before departing on 12 January 2018. Havingously appeared as a baby and a toddler, Ben returned to EastEnders in 2006 played by child actor Charlie Jones. Jones was cast alongside Megan Jossa, who would play his cousin Courtney Mitchell. While Ben is partially deaf, Jones is a hearing actor. The Guardian's Rebecca Atkinson suggested that, as only the second disabled character in EastEnders's history, Ben was introduced to fulfil a BBC quota. She criticised Jones' casting, and opined, "The use of able-bodied actors to play disabled characters is endemic. Maybe in theory there's nothing wrong with that, but while real disabled people are invisible it is downright offensive to persistently cast able-bodied people in disabled roles."

== Joe Wicks ==
Joe Wicks, played by Paul Nicholls, appears on screen between 25 March 1996 and 14 November 1997. EastEnders was praised for the character's portrayal of schizophrenia. EastEnders story editor, Ian Aldwinkle, decided to introduce a character with schizophrenia after working on the drama series Casualty, which featured violent and dramatic incidents involving people with the illness, but only focussed on the medical side. Aldwinkle researched the illness and says he was shocked to discover that it affects one in 100 people, but it was rarely spoken about. He said: "Because it has a continuing storyline, EastEnders was able to look at the effect that schizophrenia has on a family and on individual relationships. I wanted to humanise it and look at the emotional impact it has on people." He said he hoped that the storyline would be helpful, saying "It seems to me that mental illness is one of the last subjects that you can still make jokes about without being labelled politically incorrect, and that seems wrong. If I get just one letter from one person saying that the character of Joe Wicks has helped to change their life for the better, then I will be pleased."

== Lorraine Wicks ==
Lorraine Wicks, played by Jacqueline Leonard, is introduced in April 1996, as the former wife of the already established character David Wicks (Michael French). She is brought into the serial along with her son Joe Wicks (Paul Nicholls). Author Kate Lock has described Lorraine as "relentlessly sensible, fair and nice" but with a "rogue gene" that prompted her to select the wrong kind of men. As well as a high-profile storyline concentrating on Joe's diagnosis of schizophrenia, Lorraine's most prominent storyline is a love triangle between herself, Grant Mitchell (Ross Kemp) and Grant's wife Tiffany (Martine McCutcheon). In the storyline, Lorraine discovers that Tiffany is keeping a secret from Grant – that he is potentially not the father of her unborn child. When Tiffany refuses to tell Grant the truth, Lorraine does, making way for them to become a legitimate couple, albeit briefly. Leonard commented in December 1996, "Lorraine has had a year on her own and she feels that she probably needs a bit of contact – and Grant's quite macho. It was very interesting from my point of view because Lorraine could be perceived as being bitchy and she's not. She genuinely cares about Tiffany and their marriage and the baby and she wants the whole situation sorted out. But she and Grant do like each other and care about each other and it loses control a bit."

== Alistair Matthews ==
Alistair Matthews
- EastEnders character
- Portrayed by: Neil Clark
- Duration: 1996–1997
- First appearance: Episode 1280; 23 April 1996
- Last appearance: Episode 1430; 31 March 1997
In-universe information
- Occupation: Store manager

Alistair Matthews, played by Neil Clark, is a store manager who catches Sarah Hills (Daniela Denby-Ashe) shoplifting in April 1996, but promises not to call the police if she attends his Christian fellowship and turns her back on her sinful ways. Sarah is captivated by Alistair's Christian preachings and joins his fellowship. Frankie Pierre (Syan Blake) is drawn to Alistair too, and when he turns her advances down, she spreads rumours that they were sexually involved; although Alistair publicly denies this, causing Frankie's downfall in Walford.

Alistair condemns Sarah for having pre-marital sex with Robbie Jackson (Dean Gaffney) during a crisis of faith. However, Sarah is hurt to discover that Alistair does not practice the piety that he preaches, and when she realises that he is having pre-marital sex with his girlfriend Sue Taylor (Charlotte Bellamy), she denounces him publicly in front of his congregation.

== Jim Branning ==
Jim Branning is a fictional character from the BBC soap opera EastEnders, played by John Bardon. First appearing on 29 April 1996 and becoming a regular character in 1999, he remains in the series right until 2011. Jim was written out of the show in August 2007 due to Bardon suffering a stroke. A storyline was created where Jim also suffers a stroke. Bardon returned to film four episodes in the latter half of 2008. He returned permanently from the episode broadcast on 20 August 2009. On 1 April 2011 it was reported by the Daily Mirror that Bardon had filmed his final scenes and had left. He departed on 26 May 2011. On the behest of producer John Yorke in 2000, Jim was paired romantically with pensioner Dot Cotton, played by June Brown; a slow courtship is featured, with Dot often shown to be outraged by Jim's advances, resulting in numerous rejections. Dot finally succumbs and accepts his marriage proposal in an episode that first aired in November 2001; the scenes were filmed inside one of the carriages of the London Eye on the South Bank of the River Thames. Their wedding first aired on 14 February 2002, Valentine's Day. The Guardian critic, Nancy Banks-Smith, described the wedding as "uniquely uneventful [...] For Dot and Jim 'In sickness and health... till death do us part' seemed to carry more resonance than for most."

== Suzy Branning ==
Suzy Branning (originally known as Sue) is the daughter of Jim and Reenie Branning (John Bardon and Joy Graham). She is first seen in 1996 for her sister April Branning (Debbie Arnold)'s wedding to her fiancé Nikos, along with her children, Rebecca and Kevin. Initially played by Julie Christian-Young in 1996, Maggie O'Neill took over the role in 2008. O'Neill began filming in May 2008, and she made her first on-screen appearance as Suzy on 8 July 2008. She made her last appearance on Boxing Day 2008.

== Derek Branning ==
Derek Branning, played by Terence Beesley in 1996 and Jamie Foreman from 2011 to 2012, is the eldest child of Jim Branning (John Bardon) and Reenie Branning (Joy Graham). Derek made his first appearance on 29 April 1996 and departed not long after. The character returned as a regular character on 24 November 2011, played by Foreman. Derek is originally portrayed as a racist and is against his sister Carol (Lindsey Coulson) marrying Alan (Howard Antony). Derek is described as a "charmer" and "proper East-End". In an interview with Daybreak, Foreman said he wants viewers to "like Derek" Discussing Derek's personality, Foreman told TV Choice: "There's always this little undercurrent of, 'This guy isn't who we want around for long', if you see what I mean. Derek's just come back from a 10-year prison sentence for armed robbery. He's a very complicated character, who could either be perceived as a bully or as someone who cares for his family very much." The character was killed off on Christmas Day 2012, after suffering a heart attack.

== Reenie Branning ==
Reenie Branning
- EastEnders character
- Portrayed by: Joy Graham
- First appearance: Episode 1282; 29 April 1996
- Last appearance: Episode 1283; 30 April 1996
In-universe information
- Other names: Doreen Gardener
- Family: Branning
- Husband: Jim Branning (until 1999)
- Sons: Derek Branning; Max Branning; Jack Branning
- Daughters: April Branning; Carol Jackson; Suzy Branning
- Grandsons: Joey Branning; Bradley Branning; Oscar Branning; James Branning; Ricky Branning; Robbie Jackson; Billie Jackson; Kevin
- Granddaughters: Alice Branning; Lauren Branning; Abi Branning; Annie Carter; Penny Branning; Amy Mitchell; Bianca Jackson; Sonia Fowler; Rebecca
- Other relatives: Liam Butcher; Tiffany Butcher; Morgan Butcher; Bex Fowler; Julia Fowler; Sami Jackson; Louie Beale; Jimmy Beale; AJ Branning; Charli Slater

Reenie Branning, played by Joy Graham, is the first wife of Jim Branning (John Bardon), and mother of Derek Branning (Terence Beesley/Jamie Foreman), April Branning (Debbie Arnold), Carol Jackson (Lindsey Coulson), Suzy Branning (Julie Christian-Young/Maggie O'Neill), Max Branning (Jake Wood) and Jack Branning (Scott Maslen).

Reenie is said to be very maternal, and dotes on all of her children, despite their faults. She is particularly close to her oldest daughter, April, whilst her relationships with daughters Carol and Suzy are notably strained due to their choice of lifestyle. Reenie appears on-screen in April 1996, in the lead-up to April's wedding to her fiancé Nikos (Yorgos Glastras). Reenie does not appear alongside her youngest sons, Max and Jack, as they were written into the series much later. Off-screen, in October 1999, it is revealed that Reenie is critically ill with breast cancer, and her daughter Carol leaves Walford to care for her. A few weeks later, Reenie dies.

== Huw Edwards ==
Huw Edwards, played by Richard Elis, is introduced in 1996 and remains on-screen till 1999. Welsh actor Richard Elis was cast in the minor role of Huw for a period of three episodes in 1996; however, producers enjoyed the character and his contract was extended. It was reported in December 1998 that executive producer Matthew Robinson had axed Huw because the character was "going nowhere". However, Elis claimed in 2010 that he decided to leave the role in 1999 after three years playing Huw as he feared being typecast. Elis has commented, "My agent at the time told me that if you are in a soap for three years, it takes three years for the viewers to forget you, whereas if you are in one for five years, it takes another 10 years before they forget you. I just felt it was time to go. It was great to be on it but it was just a job to me."

== Lenny Wallace ==
Lenny Wallace
- EastEnders character
- Portrayed by: Desune Coleman
- Duration: 1996–1999
- First appearance: Episode 1295; 28 May 1996
- Last appearance: Episode 1802; 6 July 1999
In-universe information
- Occupation: Barman

Lenny Wallace is played by Desune Coleman from 28 May 1996 to 6 July 1999. Coleman was appearing in a West End production of Miss Saigon when he was cast as Lenny. He spent a fortnight filming for EastEnders and appearing in the musical at the same time. Colemen commented, "My first two weeks on EastEnders were probably the most hectic time of my entire life." Lenny was introduced around the same time as Huw Edwards, played by Richard Elis. Coleman thought they were not "huge storyline characters" and likened them to the B-side of a record, as they would prop up other plots.

Lenny is a fun loving individual, who does not take life too seriously. He has a penchant for loud music and an eye for the ladies. He is first seen in Walford in May 1996. Lenny, along with his Welsh friend, Huw Edwards (Richard Elis), are employed by George Palmer (Paul Moriarty) as barmen for the Cobra Club.

Lenny and Huw soon move to Albert Square and begin renting 55 Victoria Road from Mark and Ruth Fowler (Todd Carty and Caroline Paterson). The house is situated next to Ian Beale (Adam Woodyatt)'s and they manage to make an enemy of him by continually playing their music extremely loudly in the evening, and they also operate a pirate radio station from the premises for a while. As well as his bar work, Lenny is also hired as a cab driver by Barry Evans (Shaun Williamson) in 1997. Lenny spends most of his time drinking, playing poker and throwing parties. Lenny is also a womaniser, and he takes an immediate shine to Bianca Jackson (Patsy Palmer). He constantly pursues her and even though she is dating Ricky Butcher (Sid Owen) at the time, they have a one-night stand, which results in a pregnancy scare. Lenny is mortified at the idea of being a father, but it turns out to be a false alarm. Bianca opts not to tell Ricky about her infidelity, and marries him instead.

After the Cobra Club closes following a police raid, Lenny loses his job and both he and Huw are unable to pay their rent on time. Mark and Ruth decide to ask them to vacate the property, but they refuse and claim squatters' rights instead. Although it is initially Huw's idea to claim squatters' rights, when Barry Evans offers him a room at his flat, he jumps at the chance and leaves Lenny alone. Lenny is furious, but as it is now just him in the house, Mark and Ruth decide to let him stay on as a lodger and they move back in. He stays with them for several months until he patches up his differences with Huw and they both then decide to squat in one of the flats at 47 Albert Square. Lenny has a keen interest in speedway motorbike racing, and takes Ricky Butcher along with him on one occasion. Ricky turns out to be quite a skilled racer and Lenny is soon persuading him to take up speedway racing professionally so he can be his manager. He is sacked shortly after when Ricky's wife Bianca decides to take over the job in his place. Lenny returns to work as a barman in 1998, firstly for Annie Palmer (Nadia Sawalha) at the Market Cellar until she fires him, and then for Steve Owen (Martin Kemp) at the e20.

Lenny's womanising catches up with him when his ex-girlfriend, Alice McMahon (Carli Norris), arrives in Walford with the news that she has tested positive for the sexually transmitted disease, Hepatitis B. She fears that he may also be carrying the disease and instructs him to get tested. Robbie Jackson (Dean Gaffney) overhears their conversation, and immediately informs his sister, Bianca. Bianca is mortified, thinking that her prior tryst with Lenny has put her at risk. This leads to Bianca admitting to Ricky that she had sex with Lenny two years earlier, and this puts their relationship under severe strain. With everyone on the Square turning against him, Lenny feels isolated and depressed. However Huw is supportive and to Lenny's relief, his test results for Hepatitis B are negative. Later in the year Lenny busies himself with the promotion of Mick McFarlane (Sylvester Williams)'s band and also goes to France with Huw, Barry, and Robbie to watch the 1998 World Cup. He also begins a relationship with Teresa di Marco (Leila Birch), though it soon ends when Teresa's brother, Gianni (Marc Bannerman), finds out about it. Gianni is aware of Lenny's womanising past, and refuses to allow Teresa to see Lenny.

After Huw leaves Walford in April 1999, Lenny remains behind working at the e20. When Steve Owen, his boss, is imprisoned for the murder of Saskia Duncan (Deborah Sheridan-Taylor), Lenny earns the wrath of his friends for supporting Steve, instead of Matthew Rose (Joe Absolom), whom Steve has falsely named as the real murderer. Shortly after, Lenny is offered work in a West End club, so he decides to take the offer and leaves Walford in July 1999.

Marianna Manson from Closer Online put Lenny on her list of the 11 most iconic black characters in British soap operas, writing, "He's best known for his affair with EastEnders legend Bianca Jackson, while she was in a relationship with Ricky Butcher, which resulted in a pregnancy scare. He eventually left Walford in 1999 for pastures new (The West End, to be precise)."

== Simon Raymond ==
Simon Raymond, played by Andrew Lynford, is introduced in 1996 as the homosexual brother of Tiffany Mitchell (Martine McCutcheon). His relationship with the bisexual character Tony Hills (Mark Homer) featured a gay kiss that caused controversy in the UK; numerous complaints were made because of its broadcasting. Simon remained in the serial until 1999, at which time it was mutually agreed between Lynford and executive producer Matthew Robinson, that the character had run its course. The character is given a happy ending, reuniting with his former boyfriend Tony to travel Europe. Lynford has suggested that he and the writers of EastEnders intended to portray Simon as a "perfectly normal" young gay man who would entertain and educate and for whom sexuality was "no big deal".

== Frankie Pierre ==
Frankie Pierre appeared between 1996 and 1997, played by Syan Blake. Frankie is introduced as a "super-bitch" and home wrecker. She attempts to ruin the established relationships of several characters during her year in the soap, purposefully seducing attached men. Frankie's arrival in June 1996 is part of a storyline that breaks up the marriage of the characters Alan and Carol Jackson (Howard Antony and Lindsey Coulson). Frankie eventually departs in March 1997 amidst a failed attempt at seducing a religious evangelist, Alistair Matthews (Neil Clark), who had been trying to make her change her promiscuous lifestyle. Off-screen it was reported that Syan Blake and the producers of EastEnders had decided to write the character out of the serial, as the actress was receiving death threats from angry fans that could not separate fact from fiction, and blamed Blake for her character's home-wrecking. The official EastEnders book Who's Who states that Frankie "had a carnivorous approach to relationships, hunting down her quarry, devouring her victim in two gulps and then moving onto the next kill."

== Mick McFarlane ==
Mick McFarlane
- EastEnders character
- Portrayed by: Sylvester Williams
- Duration: 1996–2002
- First appearance: Episode 1306; 24 June 1996
- Last appearance: Episode 2242; 22 January 2002
In-universe information
- Occupation: Musician
- Father: John McFarlane
- Mother: Josie McFarlane
- Half-sisters: Kim McFarlane

Mick McFarlane is played by Sylvester Williams from 24 June 1996 to 22 January 2002. Williams admitted that he was attracted to the role because of Mick's background, which he thought was interesting.

Mick is a musician and he arrives in Albert Square in June 1996, when his jazz band comes to audition for a regular gig in the Bridge Street café's night Bistro. Alan Jackson (Howard Antony), manager of the night café, hears them play and instantly hires them. Mick's ex-girlfriend Frankie Pierre (Syan Blake) is the singer in the band, and she maliciously ruins several relationships on the Square before she quits the band, and leaves Mick with no band, and no source of income. He is forced to seek work elsewhere, so he starts work at the café in May 1997. In 1998, Mick decides to reform his band and holds auditions for another singer. After turning down many hopefuls, he finds a young female soloist named Lola Christie (Diane Parish). Mick is immediately attracted to Lola and eventually the two start dating. However, later in the year Lola is offered a contract as a professional singer, so she dumps Mick and the band.

Later that year Mick is visited by his mother, Josie McFarlane (Joan Hooley), on holiday from Jamaica. Mick is nervous about Josie's visit as he has led her to believe that he is a successful musician. She is not pleased to discover Mick is working in a café. However, Josie has secrets of her own. She brings a young girl named Kim (Krystle Williams) with her, claiming she is a distant relative. However, eventually Josie admits that Kim is Mick's half sister – the result of an affair that Mick's late father had had many years before. Kim's mother is dead and Josie took Kim in rather than see her go into care. Josie also confesses that she had been conned in a Jamaican property scam and is now penniless. Mick is extremely shocked to discover that his parents had deceived him for so long, but he welcomes his mother and half-sister into his life and home. Mick soon warms to the idea of having a little sister. although he does find Kim's tagging around after him a little irksome at first. Later that year, Ian Beale (Adam Woodyatt) fires Mick after several residents suffer a bout of food poisoning.

In January 1999, Mick makes friends with the new doctor, Fred Fonseca (Jimi Mistry), and moves in with him. Fred later gives Mick a loan when he decides to take over Matthew Rose's (Joe Absolom) CD stall. Later that year, Mick, Fred and a few other Walford residents go to Brighton, where Fred attends a medical convention. Whilst away, it becomes apparent to everyone, bar Mick, that Fred has something he wants to reveal. Fred is gay and is too afraid to admit his sexuality to Mick, so takes him to a gay club in the hope that Mick might 'cotton on'. Mick doesn't realise what Fred is trying to tell him and is extremely shocked when Fred finally confesses. Mick is hurt that Fred has felt unable to confide in him and that Fred doesn't fancy him! The friendship stays intact, despite Mick's mother (also Fred's receptionist) denouncing Fred's lifestyle as immoral. Mick later starts dating barmaid/ex-prostitute Nina Harris (Troy Titus-Adams). However, Mick's judgmental mother causes problems here, too, when she discovers Nina's past. Mick and Josie's relationship is sorely tested, culminating in Mick branding his mother a 'lonely, bitter, old woman'. Soon after, Josie is forced to leave England after a mix-up with her visa, leaving Kim in Mick's care. Mick and Nina's relationship ends, as Nina leaves Walford to look after her dying father.

With the added financial responsibility of caring for his young sister, Mick gets a part-time job as a limousine driver for Phil Mitchell (Steve McFadden). However, he is sacked when Phil finds dog hair in the car, sparking a feud between them with Phil doing everything he can to undermine Mick. However, despite his dislike of Phil, Mick's constant money problems make him swallow his pride and ask for his job at the café back. He also has a spell as the radio controller for Barry Evans's (Shaun Williamson) cab firm. Early in 2002, Mick is offered a gig as a touring saxophone player in a band, but has to turn it down, owing to being Kim's legal guardian. Soon after, he needs money to send Kim on a school trip and pleads with Phil for an advance on his wages. Phil refuses and Mick is forced to sell his saxophone to raise the money instead. When Kim discovers this, she buys his saxophone back with the money for her school trip, contacts Mick's musician contact and accepts the gig on his behalf. Kim is adamant that Mick should follow his dream, and so Mick leaves Kim with a relative away from the Square, and leaves Walford himself in January 2002.

== George Palmer ==
George Palmer, played by Paul Moriarty, appears between 1996 and 1998. Actor Paul Moriarty was asked to read for the role of George along with 10 other actors. Moriarty was called back instantly and asked to begin working on the role the following day. He has commented to an American fan-based publication, "[It was] quite overwhelming. I had watched the show but not religiously [...] So I show up at [the studios in] Borehamwood the very next day, straight to make-up and then onto [the soap's setting of] Albert Square to do my first bit [...] I might just as well have landed on Mars." George had been described as "shady". The character was one of many to be axed in 1998 by Executive Producer Matthew Robinson, following a dip in ratings.

== Betty ==
Betty
- EastEnders character
- Portrayed by: Vivienne Martin
- Appears in: Episode 1305; 20 June 1996
In-universe information
- Family: Fowler
- Nephews: Arthur Fowler
- Other relatives: Mark Fowler; Martin Fowler; Michelle Fowler

Betty, also known as Auntie Betty, is played by Vivienne Martin. She is Arthur Fowler's (Bill Treacher)'s aunt from Leigh-on-Sea.

Betty is mentioned frequently in the programme from its inception, and her home acts as a refuge for the Fowlers when they want to escape Walford. In 1986, Arthur, his wife Pauline (Wendy Richard) and daughter Michelle (Susan Tully) tell Pauline's mother, Lou Beale (Anna Wing), that they are visiting Betty, when in reality they are searching for their missing son Mark (David Scarboro) in Southend-on-Sea. Later in the year, Arthur considers begging Betty for money towards Michelle's wedding to Lofty Holloway (Tom Watt); he does, but instead of money she sends Michelle a note about "what to expect of married life".

In 1988, an ailing Lou spends some time in Leigh-on-Sea with Betty, before returning home to die. Arthur and Pauline also recuperate at Betty's in late 1989, while Pauline recovered from both fibroids and being hit by Ricky Butcher's (Sid Owen) car.

Betty appears in 1996 for Arthur's funeral, with her boyfriend Gerard. Betty is greeted by Pauline and Mark (now Todd Carty), while Gerard makes unintentionally rude and insensitive remarks about Arthur, disturbing many of those present. Betty clashes with Nellie Ellis (Elizabeth Kelly), continuing a long-standing feud dating back to World War II, when Betty had relationships with several men, including Nellie's boyfriend at the time.

In 2004, Pauline names her dog after her.

== Charlie Mason ==
Charlie Mason
- EastEnders character
- Portrayed by: Campbell Morrison
- Duration: 1996, 1998–1999
- First appearance: Episode 1354; 8 October 1996
- Last appearance: Episode 1844; 5 October 1999
In-universe information
- Occupation: Detective Chief Inspector

Detective Chief Inspector Charlie Mason, played by Campbell Morrison, is a detective who first appears when Ian Beale (Adam Woodyatt) is shot by hitman John Valecue (Steve Weston), working for his wife, Cindy (Michelle Collins). He later appears when Tiffany Mitchell (Martine McCutcheon) falls down the stairs at The Queen Victoria public house, and arrests Grant Mitchell (Ross Kemp) for her attempted murder on Christmas Day 1998. He later appears at the inquest into Tiffany's death in January 1999. He also investigates Saskia Duncan (Deborah Sheridan-Taylor)'s disappearance in March 1999 and appears at Steve Owen (Martin Kemp) and Matthew Rose (Joe Absolom)'s trial for her murder in October 1999. This is his last appearance.

== Terry Raymond ==
Terry Raymond, played by Gavin Richards, is initially introduced briefly in 1996 as the drunken father of Tiffany (Martine McCutcheon) and Simon Raymond (Andrew Lynford). He is reintroduced as a full-time character in 1997 and remains in the serial until 2002, when actor Gavin Richards decided to leave. Terry was not killed off in the soap; he departed in 2002 in search of his estranged wife. Tim Randall from the Daily Record suggested in 2001 that Terry and Irene's double-act was "EastEnders at its best", but that the relationship between Terry and Janine was "enough to turn your stomach".

== Other characters ==
Character	Date(s)	Actor	Circumstances
Sue Taylor	25 April 1996–31 March 1997	Charlotte Bellamy	The girlfriend of Alistair Matthews (Neil Clark).
Kevin	29–30 April (2 episodes)	Jamie Dispirito	The young son of Suzy Branning (Julie Christian-Young/Maggie O'Neill) who attends his aunt, April's (Debbie Arnold) wedding. He acts as the pageboy. He is then mentioned in December 2008 when Suzy tells her fiancé Phil Mitchell (Steve McFadden) that she has a son and a daughter but never speaks to them.
Rebecca	29–30 April (2 episodes)	Alice Dawnay	The teenage daughter of Suzy Branning (Julie Christian-Young/Maggie O'Neill) who attends her aunt, April's (Debbie Arnold) wedding. She acts as a bridesmaid, and her cousin Robbie Jackson (Dean Gaffney) is attracted to her. She is then mentioned in December 2008 when Suzy tells her fiancée Phil Mitchell (Steve McFadden) that she has a son and a daughter but never speaks to them.
Dr Khan	25 June – 16 July (4 episodes)	Sakuntala Ramanee	When Ben Mitchell (Matthew Silver) is rushed to hospital, Dr Khan informs Ben's parents, Kathy (Gillian Taylforth) and Phil Mitchell (Steve McFadden) that Ben has meningitis, and that it is common and unlikely to develop. When Kathy learns that Mark Fowler (Todd Carty) has HIV, she asks Dr Khan if Ben's meningitis could have anything to do with AIDS, but Dr Khan reassures her that they are not connected as the bacteria that causes meningitis is common. Dr Khan lets Kathy and Phil know of Ben's progress and that they will be able to discharge him the following day. At a check up, Dr Khan tells Kathy and Phil that she is referring Ben to an ENT specialist as there could be a degree of hearing loss after having meningitis.
Rivkah Gerson	22 July	Catherine Kanter	Felix Kawalski's (Harry Landis) niece, who comes to Walford to meet him after getting in touch through a family tracing organisation. Rivkah informs Felix that his sister is still alive and is living in Israel. She tells him about his parents and what happened to the family when they went to the concentration camp. She also tells him that he has a nephew called Felix. Rivkah agrees to call her mother about Felix, as he thinks he might be unable to talk upon hearing her voice. He also decides to visit his sister as soon as possible.
Roddy	6 August	Eddie Marsan	
Howard	19 August–2 September (2 episodes)	Dorian Lough	Simon Raymond's (Andrew Lynford) ex-boyfriend.
Nikos	22 October	Yorgos Glastras	April Branning's (Debbie Arnold) fiance who jilts her at the altar in April 1996 and flees back to Athens. Six months later, Nikos arrives on Albert Square to win April back after admitting that he had gotten cold feet on their wedding day and asks her for another chance. April, after some reluctance agrees to give him another chance and they leave the Square together and later marry.
John Valecue	28 October 1996– 10 April 1998 (4 episodes)	Steve Weston	A professional hitman, hired by Cindy Beale (Michelle Collins) to kill her husband Ian (Adam Woodyatt). He shoots Ian on 7 October 1996, but fails to kill him, leaving him wounded in hospital. Several weeks later, Phil (Steve McFadden) and Grant Michell (Ross Kemp) track him down and force information about the shooting out of him. Ian fails to identify his assailant, but Valecue is later arrested for another failed shooting. Annie Palmer (Nadia Sawalha) and Ros Thorne (Clare Grogan) visit him in prison in 1998 when they are trying to help Ian get custody of his stepson Steven (Stuart Stevens) and son Peter (Francis Brittin-Snell). Annie threatens to use her contacts inside the prison to get at Valecue, unless he implicates Cindy in the attempted murder of Ian. He does so and Cindy is arrested and charged for attempted murder.
