= Suzy Branning =

Fictional character from the BBC soap opera EastEnders

- EastEnders character
- Maggie O'Neill as Suzy Branning (2008)
- Portrayed by: Julie Christian-Young (1996); Maggie O'Neill (2008)
- Duration: 1996, 2008
- First appearance: Episode 1282; 29 April 1996
- Last appearance: Episode 3708; 26 December 2008
- Introduced by: Corinne Hollingworth (1996); Diederick Santer (2008)
In-universe information
- Occupation: Beautician
- Family: Branning
- Father: Jim Branning
- Mother: Reenie Branning
- Stepmother: Dot Cotton
- Brothers: Derek Branning; Max Branning; Jack Branning
- Sisters: April Branning; Carol Jackson
- Husband: Ken
- Sons: Kevin
- Daughters: Rebecca
- Nephews: Joey Branning; Robbie Jackson; Billie Jackson; Bradley Branning; Oscar Branning; Ricky Branning; James Branning
- Nieces: Alice Branning; Bianca Jackson; Sonia Fowler; Lauren Branning; Abi Branning; Penny Branning; Amy Mitchell; Annie Carter
- Other relatives: Liam Butcher; Tiffany Butcher; Morgan Butcher

Suzy Branning (originally known as Sue) is a fictional character from the BBC One soap opera EastEnders. She was played by Julie Christian-Young for a brief appearance in April 1996, and Maggie O'Neill in 2008. O'Neill began filming in May that year, and she appeared as Suzy from 8 July to 26 December 2008. Soon after her reintroduction in 2008, Suzy begins a relationship with Phil Mitchell (Steve McFadden) and enters into a rivalry with Phil's other love interest Shirley Carter (Linda Henry). She schemes to con Phil out of his money, and after her intentions are discovered, Suzy leaves Walford.

== Creation and development ==
The character, then referred to as Sue, was seen at the wedding of her sister, April Branning (Debbie Arnold) in 1996, appearing in two episodes, played by Julie Christian-Young. On 23 April 2008, it was announced that Suzy would be returning to EastEnders. Maggie O'Neill was cast in the role, taking over from Julie Christian-Young. Suzy was re-introduced as a love interest for established character Phil Mitchell (Steve McFadden) and makes a strong love rival of Shirley Carter (Linda Henry). Of her casting, O'Neill commented: "The Brannings are a great family and I am really excited to become one of them. Suzy is a woman to be reckoned with and I'm looking forward to playing her." Diederick Santer added: "I've long-admired Maggie's work from her outstanding performance in Take Me Home to her hilarious and moving Sheila in Shameless. She's yet another top drawer addition to our wonderful cast." O'Neill made her first appearance as Suzy on 8 July 2008. In an interview with Digital Spy, Santer said that viewers will soon notice that Suzy Branning is never far from her large pink handbag and viewers will always be unsure of its contents.

== Storylines ==
=== 1996 ===
Sue first appears in 1996 for her sister April Branning's (Debbie Arnold) wedding to her fiancé Nikos (Yorgos Glastras), along with her children, Rebecca (Alice Dawnay) and Kevin (Jamie Dispirito). Nikos jilts April at the altar, so Sue's other sister Carol Jackson (Lindsey Coulson) and her boyfriend Alan Jackson (Howard Antony) marry instead. After the wedding, Sue is not heard of until October 2007, when it is revealed she is unable to attend her nephew Bradley Branning's (Charlie Clements) wedding to Stacey Slater (Lacey Turner).

=== 2008 ===
In July 2008, her brother Max Branning (Jake Wood) receives a series of calls from Sue, now known as Suzy, asking for financial help. Max arranges for his friend Phil Mitchell (Steve McFadden) to take some money to Suzy at the salon which she is looking after for a friend, Tantasy. Suzy presumes that Phil has been sent by her ex-partner, and knocks him out by hitting him around the head with a figurine. After some heavies turn up at the salon, Phil takes her to his home, The Queen Victoria public house, and she thanks him for saving her by sleeping with him. She later returns to see Phil, during Roxy Slater's (Rita Simons) wedding reception. Phil is delighted to see her, and they share a kiss. Phil says she can stay the night. Suzy meets Max, asking him if she can stay with him. She buries something in the allotments and the following day, Patrick Trueman (Rudolph Walker) accuses her of stealing the potatoes he was growing. She assures him she did not, despite looking suspicious.

Suzy takes the spare room at her stepmother Dot Branning's (June Brown) house and looks after Max's wife Tanya Branning's (Jo Joyner) salon while she is away. Suzy later asks Phil to dig something up for her, revealed to be a bar of gold. Phil then moves in with Suzy, but his son Ben (Charlie Jones) takes a disliking to her. Phil cheats on Suzy with Shirley Carter (Linda Henry), which Suzy discovers. She tells Phil she is pregnant, but it is a lie, and she plans to con him out of his money to pay her ex-boyfriend Ahmet (Tamer Hassan). Phil proposes to Suzy, who accepts. Shirley and her best friend Heather Trott (Cheryl Fergison) discover that Suzy is still buying tampons, and realise she is not pregnant. Suzy lies to Phil that she had a miscarriage; when she reveals to Phil that she lied, they break up. However, Archie Mitchell (Larry Lamb) uses Suzy to plant DNA results in a Christmas cracker, showing that Sean Slater (Robert Kazinsky) is not the father of Roxy's baby. Suzy leaves after insulting the entire Mitchell family, before Sean finds the results. Phil discovers that £10,000 is missing and blames Suzy, so he and Shirley go to find her. In The Queen Vic, Shirley trips Suzy and she is knocked out. Shirley takes the money back and when Suzy comes around, she burns it, telling Suzy to get out. Suzy then leaves Walford.

Suzy writes to Phil's mother Peggy (Barbara Windsor) a few months later on a postcard from Dubai, telling her she did not need Archie's money after all, but after being found by Danielle Jones (Lauren Crace), Archie is able to dispose of the postcard before Peggy receives it. However, a few weeks later, Danielle exposes Suzy's involvement with Archie to the Mitchells at Archie and Peggy's wedding.

Suzy is mentioned in 2015 as being unable to attend the funeral of her father, Jim Branning (John Bardon), and Max declares during his eulogy that his sisters hated Jim so much that they made no effort to attend his funeral. Suzy is mentioned again in 2018 when Max goes to stay with her, and again in 2025 when her youngest brother Jack Branning (Scott Maslen) goes to stay with her after she breaks her collarbone.

== Reception ==
Kyle O'Sullivan from the Daily Mirror called Suzy "troublesome" and noted that she "managed to annoy a lot of people".
