= Jim Branning =

Fictional character from EastEnders

- EastEnders character
- Portrayed by: John Bardon
- Duration: 1996, 1999–2011
- First appearance: Episode 1282; 29 April 1996
- Last appearance: Episode 4218; 26 May 2011
- Introduced by: Corinne Hollingworth (1996); Matthew Robinson (1999); Diederick Santer (2008)
- Spin-off appearances: Pudding Lane (1999)
In-universe information
- Other names: James Archibald Branning "Basher Branning" (boxing name)
- Occupation: Boxer; Potman
- Family: Branning
- Wife: Reenie Gardener (until 1999); Dot Cotton (2002–2015)
- Sons: Derek Branning; Max Branning; Jack Branning
- Daughters: April Branning; Carol Jackson; Suzy Branning
- Stepsons: Nick Cotton
- Grandsons: Robbie Jackson; Billie Jackson; Joey Branning; Bradley Branning; Oscar Branning; James Branning; Ricky Branning; Kevin
- Granddaughters: Bianca Jackson; Sonia Fowler; Alice Branning; Lauren Branning; Abi Branning; Annie Carter; Penny Branning; Amy Mitchell; Rebecca
- Other relatives: Liam Butcher; Tiffany Butcher; Morgan Butcher; Bex Fowler; Julia Fowler; Sami Jackson; Louie Beale; Jimmy Beale; Abi Branning Jnr; Charli Slater; Whitney Dean (adoptive)

Jim Branning is a fictional character from the BBC soap opera EastEnders, played by John Bardon, first appearing on 29 April 1996 and became a regular character in June 1999. He remained in the series until 26 May 2011.

Jim was temporarily written out of the show in August 2007 due to Bardon suffering a stroke, and a storyline was created in which his character also suffered a stroke. Bardon returned to film four episodes in the latter half of 2008, and returned permanently from the episode broadcast on 20 August 2009. On 1 April 2011 it was reported by the Daily Mirror that Bardon had filmed his final scenes and had left. He departed on 26 May 2011, and, although it was said the character may re-appear in the future if Bardon's health improved, this did not happen and the actor died on 12 September 2014, more than three years after leaving the series. Following Bardon's death, it was announced in March 2015 that EastEnders would pay tribute to him and the character by staging a funeral for Jim.

== Development ==
On the behest of executive producer John Yorke in 2000, Jim was paired romantically with pensioner Dot Cotton, played by June Brown; a slow courtship was featured, with Dot often shown to be outraged by Jim's advances, resulting in numerous rejections. Dot finally succumbed and accepted his marriage proposal in an episode that aired in December 2001; the scenes were filmed inside one of the carriages of the London Eye on the South Bank of the River Thames. Their wedding aired on 14 February 2002, Valentine's Day. The Guardian critic, Nancy Banks-Smith, described the wedding as "uniquely uneventful [...] For Dot and Jim 'In sickness and health... till death do us part' seemed to carry more resonance than for most."

Bardon has revealed that both he and Brown were sceptical about their characters marrying. In an interview with American fan-based newspaper, Walford Gazette, he commented, "No way did the pair of us want to get married because we thought if we got married, we'd sit indoors and watch the telly every night. As it happened, we've had some nice things to do. And we are married, and it's worked out all right." Brown has reiterated that she feared Dot would become boring if she married Jim, but that producers persuaded her that the marriage might be a good thing. On-screen, Dot had suffered the death of her grandson Ashley, and Brown felt that a traumatic event like that would have changed her character. In her opinion, the only way Dot would have got over Ashley's death "would be to have someone else to care for and when it happened there was nobody [but] with marrying Jim she gets a family - that's what persuaded me. That house will become a house again - it will have a central point, they will be able to use the house as a central point, as Dot will be there."

Critic Grace Dent has likened Dot and Jim to Coronation Street's Hilda and Stan Ogden, comparing a scene in EastEnders where Dot nags Jim and he prays for a quiet life to a similar one from Coronation Street, that aired decades before. June Brown discussed Dot's relationship with Jim in 2004: "Initially, Jim wasn't the sort of person that Dot approved of. He drank, he gambled, he lied - he wasn't reliable at all. But Jim decided that he quite fancied Dot - heaven knows why! I think that you always have to work out for yourself how you can make the character work in a new situation. I could see that Jim was kind to Dot [...] His kindness drew her towards him. [...] Dot's definitely in control of Jim. She quite enjoys bossing him around." Brown stated that she enjoys her screen partnership with John Bardon, saying "We work very well together - he's got great timing and he can be very tender too."

The on-screen relationship between Dot and Jim was halted in 2007 when Jim was written out of the soap due to Bardon suffering a stroke. In the script Jim initially visits Carol, before himself suffering a stroke and being cared for by family and later in residential care off-screen. Dot and Jim remained together, with Jim making sporadic appearances between 2008 and 2009 to visit Dot. A more permanent return for the character was hinted at in 2009, with the character returning to live in Albert Square from August of that year. It was reported in April 2011 that Bardon had filmed his exit from the series, and that the show's staff believed it marked the end of the character. A source told the Daily Mirror: "Dot's been struggling for a while and realises that she can no longer give Jim the care and attention he deserves and is forced to make the heartbreaking decision that he should move into a home. [...] It was very emotional on the set for the scenes where Dot discusses her decision and talks to Jim about him going into care for good. There were a lot of tears. [...] The feeling is that this is the end of Jim as a character because he won't leave the home and won't ever be a regular in Albert Square again." It was reported that Jim could still appear on screen in the care home if Bardon's health permitted it; however, this did not happen. Jim's final appearance was aired 26 May 2011.

== Storylines ==
=== Backstory ===
Jim dated his first wife Reenie Branning (Joy Graham), with her giving birth to their oldest child Derek Branning (Terence Beesley; later Jamie Foreman) out of wedlock. When Reenie became pregnant again with eldest daughter April Branning (Debbie Arnold), Jim settled in a loveless marriage to Reenie, having four more children with her. A heavy drinker, Jim treated his children unfairly, favouring some and neglecting others. When his son Max Branning (Jake Wood) was blamed for stealing and losing a medal that Jim's mother was given during World War II in honour of his late father for bravery, Jim severed all ties with him and lost all contact with Max. It was generally believed that Jim locked Max in a coffin on the latter's 13th birthday in retaliation for Max being friends with a non-white classmate (It was later claimed by Derek that he did this, not their father.)

Jim was an amateur boxer using the nickname "Basher" Branning, but according to Kate Lock's book Who's Who, he had been a "semi-invalid" for much of his working life following a drunken fall from a bedroom window, though he managed to maintain a job collecting supermarket trolleys until he was forced to retire.

=== 1996–2011 ===
Jim first appears when his daughter April is supposed to marry her fiancé Nikos (Yorgos Glastras). When Nikos jilts April at the altar, Jim's second daughter Carol (Lindsey Coulson) marries her boyfriend Alan Jackson (Howard Antony) instead. Jim is racist and therefore is against Carol marrying a black man. He storms out, refusing to give her away.

Three years later, Carol visits him in Southend, and later that year, Jim moves to Walford following Reenie's death and it does not take him long to chase after an eligible widow on Albert Square, Dot Cotton (June Brown). She becomes his second wife, marrying him in 2002 after a proposal on the London Eye. After a mishap with viagra, Dot decides that their marriage should remain purely platonic. Jim also has to fight off attention from several spinsters, including Maureen Carter (Diana Coupland) and Doris Moisey (Marcia Ashton), the latter nearly causing the Brannings' separation.

Despite being overtly racist initially, these hostile feelings mellow, as shown through his close friendship with the Trinidadian shopkeeper, Patrick Trueman (Rudolph Walker). Jim works as a potman, collecting glasses in The Queen Victoria public house, and likes to drink and gamble, to Dot's dismay. He is initially opposed to his granddaughter Sonia's (Natalie Cassidy) lesbian relationship with Naomi Julien (Petra Letang) but later gives his blessing. He clashes with Dot after she takes in an illegal immigrant, Anya (Olga Fedori), whose baby, Tomas, they find at a church. He reports Anya to immigration and she is taken into custody, but Dot keeps Anya's baby and makes Jim promise to look after him with her. In their old age, the Brannings struggle to look after the child, and Dot eventually listens to Jim's pleas and hands the baby over to social services.

Jim goes to stay with Carol after she is taken ill, but he suffers a stroke while he is there. Unable to take care of him, Dot has Jim admitted to a nursing home. He visits his family and friends in Walford several times, the first occasion being on his 75th birthday in August 2008 when his daughter Suzy (Maggie O'Neill) has come to stay. He later visits at Christmas, but continues to reject his son Max and animosity between them resurfaces. Following rehabilitation, Jim is permitted to return to live at home in 2009, now in better health. He can speak no more than a few words, but communicates through gestures and facial expressions, and uses a walking stick and wheelchair to get around. In February 2010, Dot's granddaughter Dotty (Molly Conlin) attempts to get Jim sent back to the care home by pouring water on his lap to make it look like he has wet himself. However, Dotty is immediately caught out. As Dot and Jim celebrate their eighth wedding anniversary in The Queen Victoria, the police arrest Dot, ruining the party and distressing Jim. He draws a picture of him and Dot as an anniversary present for her. Jim and Max bond over the death of his grandson, Max's son Bradley (Charlie Clements) and he comforts Max on the day of the funeral, kissing his hand. When Jim's youngest son Jack (Scott Maslen) is in a coma after being shot, Jim is present when he is woken up by medical staff. Jim then cries when he finds out Jack is paralysed, knowing the pain of living with a disability. Jim and Dot are later befriended by teenager Fatboy (Ricky Norwood), who later becomes a close companion to Dot. A few weeks later, another grandson, Billie Jackson (Devon Anderson) dies. Carol goes to visit Jim, who starts crying, and she breaks down in his arms.

When Carol sees Dot and Jim have no photos of Billie, she accuses them of racism, and calls Jim out for his racism towards Alan. Dot says she asked Billie for photos but was not given any, and tells Carol to leave. When Carol later arranges a family meal, she invites Jim and Dot to attend. Dot initially refuses, but later forgives her and states that Jim is still upset about Carol's accusations, so she attends alone. However, Carol shouts at Dot after a family argument, saying that she meant what she said to Jim. Carol then spends Jack's wedding day with Jim after they have reconciled. Jim later spends time in respite care after Dot fractures her wrist. In May 2011, she hires a carer, Marta Demboski (Magdalena Kurek), and asks her to help look after Jim when he returns, but sacks her when she think she has stolen money. Dot subsequently struggles to cope with Jim and is distressed by the constant noise of his buzzer. She tells Jim that she cannot cope and later asks Carol why she had to meet Jim "so near the end". Carol, Max and Jack help Dot to make the decision to put Jim into permanent care, and he is taken away in an ambulance. Jim outlives his eldest son, Derek (now Jamie Foreman), who dies from a heart attack on Christmas Day 2012. Carol visited Jim in January 2014 (however, only the hand of a stand-in was seen on screen). Dot herself visits Jim very regularly in the subsequent years.

In April 2015, Carol receives the news that Jim has died after suffering a heart attack. Sonia informs Dot, who is in prison, awaiting trial for the murder of her son, Nick (John Altman). Max and Carol struggle with the fact they deeply resented their father for a large amount of his life and thus having to mourn for him. Dot initially refuses to attend the funeral, believing she was negligent of him in his last days and this is what led to his death. She eventually changes her mind and the Brannings hold Jim's funeral. Initially, Max delivers a eulogy. He begins to talk about Jim positively, but then starts to assassinate his character, mentioning the incident when he locked Max in a coffin and Jim leaving Carol's wedding to Alan. Max also mentions how Jim was so hated by his children that only he and Carol had bothered to attend his funeral. After declaring that he is glad that Jim is dead, Max storms out. Dot subsequently delivers a moving tribute to her husband and all the people at the funeral sing My Way. Jim is then laid to rest.

== Reception ==
In 2002, Bardon was nominated in the Best Comedy Performance category at The British Soap Awards, and along with Brown, won Best On-Screen Partnership in 2002 and again in 2005. They also won Best Couple at the Inside Soap Awards in 2005 and Bardon was nominated for Funniest Star for his portrayal of Jim. In November 2010, EastEnders won the Sainsbury's Award for Mainstreaming Disability at the 2010 Cultural Diversity Network Awards, where the judges praised the character.
