= Branning =

Branning is a surname. Notable people with the surname include:

- Jenifer Branning (born 1979), American lawyer and politician

== Fictional characters ==
Fictional characters from the BBC soap opera EastEnders

- Branning family
  - Abi Branning
  - April Branning
  - Derek Branning
  - James Branning
  - Joey Branning
  - Lauren Branning
  - Max Branning
  - Oscar Branning
  - Penny Branning
  - Rachel Branning
  - Reenie Branning
  - Selina Branning
  - Suzy Branning

== Pseudonyms ==
- Martin Branning, alleged pseudonym used by Dan Wootton (born 1983), New Zealand journalist and broadcaster

== See also ==
- Banning
- Brannon
