= April Branning =

Fictional character from the BBC soap opera EastEnders

- EastEnders character
- Portrayed by: Debbie Arnold
- Duration: 1995–1996
- First appearance: Episode 1230; 28 December 1995
- Last appearance: Episode 1361; 24 October 1996
- Introduced by: Corinne Hollingworth
In-universe information
- Occupation: Timeshare seller Waitress
- Family: Branning
- Father: Jim Branning
- Mother: Reenie Branning
- Stepmother: Dot Cotton
- Brothers: Derek Branning; Max Branning; Jack Branning
- Sisters: Carol Jackson; Suzy Branning
- Husband: Nikos (1996–present)
- Nephews: Robbie Jackson; Billie Jackson; Bradley Branning; Oscar Branning; Joey Branning; James Branning; Ricky Branning; Kevin
- Nieces: Bianca Jackson; Sonia Fowler; Lauren Branning; Abi Branning; Annie Carter; Alice Branning; Penny Branning; Amy Mitchell; Rebecca

April Branning is a fictional character from the BBC soap opera EastEnders, played by Debbie Arnold. April is the eldest daughter of Jim (John Bardon) and Reenie Branning (Joy Graham). April is originally introduced as the sister of established character Carol Jackson (Lindsey Coulson), and later Derek (Terence Beesley/Jamie Foreman), Suzy (Julie Christian-Young/Maggie O'Neill), Max (Jake Wood) and Jack Branning (Scott Maslen).

== Creation and development ==
The character of April Branning, played by Debbie Arnold, is introduced in December 1995 as the "fun-loving" sister of Carol Jackson (Lindsey Coulson). Her entrance storyline is part of a plot that leads to the marriage of Carol and her boyfriend Alan (Howard Antony) - when April is jilted at the altar, Carol and Alan marry in her place. The character was turned into a regular in 1996, moving to the soap's setting of Albert Square.

At the time, Jaci Stephen, television critic for The Mirror described April as a kind of character "who, from the moment they open their mouths, appear to have been around for ever." She added, "She has bleached blonde hair, overdresses and has the kind of flirtatious manner guaranteed to drive the Square's women to violence. As April grows more glamorous Cindy (Michelle Collins) grows more dowdy."

April's most high-profile storyline is a romance with market inspector Michael Rose (Russell Floyd). In August 1996, less than a year after her arrival, it was announced that actress Debbie Arnold was quitting her role as April Branning, despite previously being quoted as saying "If they try to get rid of me, I'll chain myself to the railings of Albert Square." Arnold reportedly said, "I want to move on" and a friend of hers is quoted as saying " Debbie has already appeared in Coronation Street and Emmerdale. She's terrified of getting in a rut and wants to try her hand at other TV work - she's had plenty of offers already."

It was reported at the time that April's leaving storyline would revolve around an affair with her sister's husband Alan Jackson. According to The Mirror, "the show's bosses are planning a sensational storyline for her departure - April will start a steamy affair with her screen sister's husband Alan, played by Howard Anthony. But his missus finds out and viewers will be treated to an emotional confrontation between the two. April ends up packing her bags and leaving the Square because she still holds a torch for her brother-in-law." This proved to be false, and April instead departed after dumping Michael Rose and reuniting with her former lover to start a new life in Greece. She last appeared in October 1996.

== Storylines ==
April arrives in Albert Square in December 1995 to invite Carol and her boyfriend Alan (Howard Antony) to her wedding. April had been living and working in Greece for eight years selling time-share apartments, where she met and got engaged to a native named Nikos (Yorgos Glastras). Carol wants to reconnect with April, but is estranged from her extended family due to their racist reaction to her relationship with Alan, who is black. She initially refuses the invitation, as she knows how Alan will be received by her father, Jim Branning (John Bardon). However, April refuses to give up on having Carol at her wedding, so enlists Alan for help and chooses Carol's daughter, Sonia (Natalie Cassidy), as bridesmaid.

The ceremony is due to take place in April 1996 but just at the last minute the groom's best man turns up with the news that Nikos has fled back to Greece, leaving April distraught and humiliated. The day isn't a complete waste though as Alan and Carol get married in their place.

April returns to Walford in July to visit her sister, and after meeting the market inspector Michael Rose (Russell Floyd), to whom she is attracted to, she decides to stay. She gets herself a job working in Kathy Beale's (Gillian Taylforth) café, where she is witness to her brother-in-law's flirtations with the vindictive Frankie Pierre (Syan Blake). When it becomes obvious that Frankie is involved with Alan, April informs Carol, which eventually leads to the end of Alan and Carol's relationship.

April and Michael's relationship continues over the next few months and eventually Michael falls in love and begs April to move in with him. April is unsure whether she wants to take such a big step, and while she is considering what to do, her ex, Nikos, shows up and tries to worm his way back into her affections. He demands to marry her and despite the fact that he had previously jilted her at the altar, April decides to give him another chance. She leaves Walford with him and manages to get him down the aisle, leaving Michael to marshal his stalls and mull over what might have been.

April's last appearance is in October 1996. Eleven years later it is revealed that April is still living in Greece, and is unable to attend her nephew Bradley's (Charlie Clements) wedding to Stacey Slater (Lacey Turner). Following Jim's death in 2015, April's brother Max Branning (Jake Wood) declared during his eulogy that his sisters hated Jim so much they did not make any effort to attend his funeral.

== Reception ==
Actress Debbie Arnold was reportedly popular in the role of April, receiving 400 letters from fans in two weeks. Andrea Kon of The People observed that "Effervescent April Branning has livened up EastEnders like no other character." Kyle O'Sullivan from the Daily Mirror called April "fun-loving" and noted how April left Walford despite previously saying "If they try to get rid of me, I'll chain myself to the railings of Albert Square".
