= Derek Branning =

Fictional character from EastEnders

- EastEnders character
- Jamie Foreman as Derek Branning (2012)
- Portrayed by: Terence Beesley (1996); Jamie Foreman (2011–2012)
- Duration: 1996, 2011–2012
- First appearance: Episode 1282; 29 April 1996
- Last appearance: Episode 4554/4555; 25 December 2012
- Introduced by: Corinne Hollingworth (1996); Bryan Kirkwood (2011)
- Terence Beesley as Derek Branning (1996)
In-universe information
- Occupation: Career criminal Businessman
- Family: Branning
- Father: Jim Branning
- Mother: Reenie Branning
- Stepmother: Dot Cotton
- Brothers: Max Branning; Jack Branning
- Sisters: April Branning; Carol Jackson; Suzy Branning
- Sons: Joey Branning
- Daughters: Alice Branning
- Nephews: Bradley Branning; Oscar Branning; Robbie Jackson; Billie Jackson; Ricky Branning; James Branning; Kevin
- Nieces: Bianca Jackson; Sonia Fowler; Lauren Branning; Abi Branning; Annie Carter; Penny Branning; Amy Mitchell; Rebecca
- Other relatives: Liam Butcher; Tiffany Butcher; Morgan Butcher

Derek Branning is a fictional character from the BBC soap opera EastEnders, played by Terence Beesley in 1996 and then Jamie Foreman from 2011 to 2012. Derek is the eldest child of Jim Branning (John Bardon) and Reenie Branning (Joy Graham). He first appears in episode 1282, which was first broadcast in the United Kingdom on 29 April 1996, for his sister April Branning's (Debbie Arnold) wedding and departed on 2 May. The character returned as a regular in the episode broadcast on 24 November 2011, played by Foreman. In October 2012, it was announced that Foreman would be leaving EastEnders in December 2012 as part of a Christmas storyline. On 20 December 2012, it is revealed that Derek was the person who Kat Moon (Jessie Wallace) had an affair with (see "Who's Been Sleeping with Kat?"). The character died of a heart attack in the episode broadcast on 25 December 2012.

Derek is originally portrayed as racist and is not pleased when his sister Carol Jackson (Lindsey Coulson) married Alan Jackson (Howard Antony). Upon his return, Derek was described as a "charmer" and "proper East-End". Derek has been described as "dodgy" and a "psycho". Foreman confirmed that viewers could expect "danger" and "destruction" from his character as his time progresses on the show. The BBC describe Derek as "old school". Derek served as the show's main antagonist of 2012.

== Creation and development ==
=== Casting, introduction and departure ===
On 26 August 2011, the BBC announced that it would be extending the already-established Branning clan by reintroducing the character of Derek Branning into EastEnders. Jamie Foreman was cast in the role, being the second actor to play Derek; Terence Beesley played the character originally for three episodes in 1996. Of his casting, Foreman said, "I am hugely excited to be joining such an iconic show. EastEnders is full of fantastic actors so it is a role I couldn't refuse. The Brannings are such a great family to be joining and I am extremely interested to see how Derek is going to fit in." Derek comes to Walford and "seizes the opportunity to rule the roost among his family again", his ambition is to become "King of the Square". Derek's return was broadcast on 24 November 2011.

Foreman said he fit in well with the cast and the EastEnders set. "It's brilliant. I've walked onto the show with all these guys who are so fantastic. I've just slid in like I've been there all my life. It's been fantastic fun. And it's a character who you can do anything you want with – I love those! It's very easy work." Asked whether if he will watch his first, he replied: "They've got me in the last scene of the day at work today, so I don't know if I'm going to get home in time for it! But all the family are there watching it, so that'll be lovely."

Foreman also said it was great to have a role in EastEnders. He said: "If I did a movie and it got 8 million viewers, it'd be a box office smash. This show gets it four nights a week and once on Sunday, there you go. Its pedigree speaks for itself and it's been going for a lot of years now, and it's going to go on for a lot of years. I'd be very proud to have that on my CV." Asked what viewers can expect from Derek, he replied: "He's a habitual criminal. He's just come back from prison recently from doing a rather lumpy sentence of ten years for armed robbery." He added: "He hasn't changed, he's always been the same." Tony Stewart of the Daily Mirror said that Foreman was perfect for the role of Derek. "Of course it's all about pedigree, isn't it? And when the soap bosses picked up the phone to Thugs Are Us, they couldn't have picked a better actor than Jamie Foreman to play the biggest, baddest Branning bruvver, Derek. Well, assuming Ray Winstone was washing his hair." In March 2012, Foreman's contract with EastEnders was extended until October 2012. In October 2012, it was announced that Foreman would be leaving EastEnders and will leave in December 2012 in a Christmas storyline.

=== Characterisation ===
"Derek is old school, proper East End. After years behind bars he's looking for a place to make his mark. Look out Walford, he's arrived. He's a charmer and is on the lookout for a woman who’ll understand him. But he can also out-alpha almost any man in Albert Square. Oh, and Derek never fights fair..."

— The BBC on Derek (2011)

Derek has been described as the "biggest, baddest Branning brother" by executive producer Bryan Kirkwood. Daniel Kilkelly of media entertainment website Digital Spy wrote that upon his introduction, viewers would be left wondering if he is still dangerous and destructive. He was called "villainous" by Inside Soap. Derek's profile on the BBC's EastEnders website says, "Derek's the eldest Branning brother—and he's proper East End. When he was young, he had his own gang and they terrorised anyone who crossed their path. He ended up in prison and almost didn't make it out alive. He realises he now has his work cut out to regain his status as top dog, but he's willing to wait – although not for too long! Is Walford the place he can make his mark?" The website went on to say Derek's wish was to become head of the Branning family and find a woman who would understand him. Derek can "out-alpha almost any man in Albert Square" and he does not fight fair. Discussing Derek's background and personality, Foreman told TV Choice "There's always this little undercurrent of, 'This guy isn't who we want around for long', if you see what I mean. Derek's just come back from a 10-year prison sentence for armed robbery. He's a very complicated character, who could either be perceived as a bully or as someone who cares for his family very much." The actor went on to say people do not quite know where they are with Derek. He became the head of the family when he was 14, because his father was always in the betting shop. Derek helped bring in money and made sure his siblings attended school. Foreman explained Derek sees himself as the father figure and said it is hard for him to shake that off, even though his siblings have grown up. Foreman said "There's a nice conflict there."

In an interview with Daybreak, Foreman said he wanted viewers to like Derek. He also revealed he had played similar roles to Derek before, but said playing a "hardman" in EastEnders meant he could not leave his character behind when he finished work. Foreman said: "When you do a show like this you want to hit the floor running and make him warm and make the audience take to him as quickly as possible, so you keep him a little bit more close to yourself. Not necessarily all the nasty things he does, but all his mannerisms and they [sic] way he moves and things." During an interview, Foreman said his character is so nasty and horrible that he "makes him cringe." Foreman also revealed that Derek does not think of himself as bad, saying "I try to explain this to everybody, he thinks he's the good guy, it's everybody else who thinks he's bad." Foreman added Derek would bring plenty of trouble to Albert Square. Foreman confirmed that viewers could expect "danger" and "destruction" from his character as his time progresses on the show. Foreman explained that Derek Branning is going to be the type of character that's going to really set things alight in the Square. Foreman said that when he was asked to play the part, they told him that he was dangerous, destructive and sexy. He commented: "Well, I haven't seen much of the sexy, but I've seen lots of the dangerous and lots of the destructive! So I think you're going to enjoy him. I think he's one of those characters you're going to love to hate. You never know what he's going to do next. And I'm just waiting for little old ladies to come and beat me with their handbags!"

I didn't feel any pressure at all, because it was just such an interesting character. And I had a lot of input into it as well, before I went into the show. Because it's such an immediate show in people's living rooms, I thought it was really important to hit the floor running with it. And I have some great actors around me – the family that I've gone into, I'm wall-to-wall with good actors. And Pam St Clement gave me the best entrance I could have asked for, with her reaction to me. I was very lucky. But they say it with a smile on their faces, and I think they're enjoying the character, so I'm doing my job.

— Foreman explains his feelings before filming for EastEnders

Foreman said he is "delighted" by viewers' reaction to his character. Foreman also added that member of the public approach him in the street to "comment on Derek's antics". Speaking to The One Show, Foreman said that he gets some wonderful reactions and that he gets told every day that he's nasty and horrible and just wants to walk around saying, 'Thank you, thank you'! But they say it with a smile on their faces, and he thinks they're enjoying the character, so he's doing his job.

=== Storyline development ===
Scott Maslen teased of an upcoming storyline where Derek hires a hitman to terrorise Roxy, who is the mother of Jack's daughter. Speaking to Inside Soap, Maslen said that Jack is sickened by Derek's plans. He added that Jack may have used "underhand tactics in the past to try and get custody of Amy" but Derek is taking things too far and Jack will never forgive himself if anything bad happened to Roxy. Maslen elaborated saying that Jack first discovers Derek's plan when he visits the Mitchell's household and finds that Roxy hasn't returned home. He says that Jack is furious with Derek and adds: "Jack feels sick to his stomach at the thought something terrible could have happened to Roxy. He storms straight round to confront his brother – he just wants confirmation from Derek that Roxy is alive and well."

Jake Wood revealed that there is a "long-running" storyline upcoming for Derek and his brother Max. Speaking to Inside Soap, Wood said that the truth is to be revealed in the coming months. He said that it's incredibly exciting and everything will be explained. Wood added that himself and Foreman are "on it" and have a good idea what Max and Derek are up to. Foreman later promised an "interesting new direction" for Derek. He explained that he wants to keep challenging himself by exploring Derek's personality from different sides. Foreman commented: "We hit the ground running to bring Derek to the Square and Pam St Clement was phenomenal. In one scene, she established my character more easily than I could have done in four episodes. To see Pat, who's never been frightened of anyone, running scared of this man showed everything about my character in a moment." As stated by Jake Wood, Foreman has plans for Derek which Foreman said it will be a real challenge for him as an actor. He added that it would be easy to play a typical gangster who "growls at everyone", but he cares about showing the true side of these types of characters. Foreman also said that he is enjoying EastEnders as he has never been so recognised before.

=== Rejuvenation ===
In April 2012, it was announced that viewers would see a "softer side" to Derek. Foreman told a writer from Soaplife that it was time to learn more about Derek's history, as the audience had familiarised with the character. He will be played as a "different kind of Derek" and have a "fascinating" backstory. In addition the actor stated that "you're about to see a bit more of the missing years – I'm finding out things about my character I didn't know existed". While he wanted to remain secretive about the plans for Derek, Foreman revealed that Alfie Moon (Shane Richie) would have involvement in the storyline. Derek asks Alfie to carry out a deed for him because he already has the "sensitivity and is the perfect foil" for his plans. Later that month the serial announced their plans to introduce Derek's daughter, Alice Branning (Jasmyn Banks). Alice has never met her father and wants answers; she was brought up by her mother and her brother Joey. As they had always told her that Derek no good, she decides to see for herself. EastEnders' executive producer Lorraine Newman said that Alice would "help us glimpse a softer side to Derek". As they’re both from the Branning family, she also felt there was a "huge amount" of history to build their relationship upon. A writer from Inside Soap reported that Alice is really keen to forge a relationship with her father. An EastEnders representative told them that Derek often talks of the "importance of family"; which will make their attempts at forming a "proper relationship" interesting.

Derek's sister, Carol announces that she and her family are moving away. Derek is reluctant to see them leave and hatches a plan to prevent their departure. Foreman told Allison Jones from Inside Soap that Derek has a "patriarchal attitude" where "everyone matters" because family is most important to him. Derek wants "to put his life in order" and look out for Bianca's (Patsy Palmer) interests while she is in prison. Carol stands by her decision; so he conjures up a "frantic scheme" and attempts to influence Ray Dixon (Chucky Venn) into keeping them around. Foreman said that the plan ends in failure and "Derek has to let them go after all". Just as he loses one family unit, the serial introduce Alice. Derek is preoccupied with the family matter and Alice begins to follow him. Foreman explained that his character initially has "no idea" who she is. When Alice follows him into the pub, Derek decides to confront her. He told Allison Slade from TVTimes that Derek "has so many irons in the fire and he thinks she might be undercover police". To begin with he is wary of Alice, but is soon "delighted" to have his daughter around. The actor added that the Derek and Alice share a good chemistry.

== Storylines ==
=== 1996 ===
Derek first appears when he attends his sister April Branning's (Debbie Arnold) wedding to her Greek fiancé Nikos (Yorgos Glastras). Derek and his father Jim Branning (John Bardon) goad Derek's sister Carol Jackson's black boyfriend Alan Jackson (Howard Antony) due to their racist attitudes, and try to start fights with him. He lives with his parents and does his best to split Alan and Carol up. He does not succeed, and Carol and Alan marry the same day after April is jilted. Derek and his father walk out of the wedding in protest and Derek continues to goad Carol and Alan after the ceremony. Alan retaliates by humiliating him about still living at home at the age of 36. Derek subsequently attacks Alan, but is stopped by David Wicks (Michael French), who then beats him up as revenge for Derek beating him up when they were teenagers. A shamed Derek departs. In 1999, Jim mentions to Carol that Derek is going through a messy divorce. In 2007, Derek's brother Max Branning (Jake Wood) reveals that Derek is in prison, and is therefore unable to attend Bradley Branning's (Charlie Clements) wedding to Stacey Slater (Lacey Turner). While Derek is incarcerated, he befriends a fellow prisoner named Carl White (Daniel Coonan).

=== 2011–2012 ===
In January 2011, Derek is mentioned during an argument between Max and Carol after Max discovers Carol's relationship with Connor Stanley (Arinzé Kene). Max recites Carol's past relationships, including getting pregnant by David when she was 14, and he says Derek sorted David out by beating him up and saving Carol from a broken heart. Derek returns in November (played by Foreman) along with Max, who has been staying with him in Leyton. They visit Max's ex-wife Tanya Jessop (Jo Joyner), (who mutually despises Derek) where Derek recognises her mother Cora Cross (Ann Mitchell) and sister Rainie Cross (Tanya Franks), to whom he is attracted. He reminds her of when they had sex at Max and Tanya's wedding. Derek then recognises David's mother Pat Evans (Pam St Clement) and forces his way into her home, and she is fearful of him. He reveals he was in prison for 10 years for armed robbery. Carol enters and is not happy to see him. However, Derek says he has changed and wants his family's support, though Carol is unwilling to give it. Derek and Max then prepare to leave for Manchester, but they are stopped by his niece, Lauren Branning (Jacqueline Jossa), saying that Tanya has cancer and needs help. Max goes to Tanya and Derek tells Carol and his brother Jack Branning (Scott Maslen) that the Brannings have to stick together. Derek starts a sexual relationship with Rainie after she is kicked out of Tanya's home. She then sees a large scar on his back. Derek then bumps into Michael Moon (Steve John Shepherd), who he bullied in their youth. Michael fears Derek and after Derek agrees to help Michael's girlfriend Janine Butcher (Charlie Brooks), Michael tells her to keep away from him. Janine then asks Derek to help her get squatters out of her flat, which he does successfully.

When Derek finds out that Phil Mitchell (Steve McFadden) has had Jack's car crushed, he confronts Phil, saying that he has made an enemy of him as well. After the local B&B is destroyed in an explosion, Derek convinces his great-nephew Liam Butcher (James Forde) to retrieve some valuable copper pipes from the building, leaving his great-grandmother, Pat, infuriated. Shortly after, Derek receives a visit from his probation officer and it is clear that Pat is responsible. Furious, Derek visits her and angrily threatens her, resulting in her collapsing on the kitchen floor shortly after. Pat is then diagnosed with incurable cancer, and when Derek visits her, he teases her about dying, causing a row with Tanya, who suffers a panic attack. Tanya tells Derek to leave. David returns to see Pat, and when Derek sees him, he says they have unfinished business. Derek punches David, who retaliates by punching Derek in the face. Carol takes David's side and drags Derek off David. Carol and Derek later argue, and Carol asks Derek to leave Walford as everyone is sad about Pat's death but he is causing trouble with David. Derek storms off in a temper, and later tells David that the fight is not over. When David hints that he is re-kindling his relationship with Carol, Derek furiously tells him that once Pat's funeral has taken place, he is going to come after him. David tries to reason with Derek, but Derek repeats his threat. When Derek finds Michael in his home planting stolen goods, Michael blames David for the scheme. During Pat's funeral, Derek discovers David and Carol have reunited and are planning to run away together. He confronts Carol and attacks her before forcing Michael to tell David that he has kidnapped Carol. When David shows up looking for Carol, he is confronted by Derek, Max and Jack, and Derek plans to kill David with a knife before getting Jack to help him dispose of the body. However, Jack and Max manage to stop Derek and David flees. Derek then begs Carol for forgiveness for attacking her and explains to Max that he went too far with David.

When Phil is arrested for murder and his son Ben (Joshua Pascoe) is kicked out of his home, Derek befriends Ben to steal his keys to Phil's garage. There, he looks through Phil's accounts, and later visits Phil in prison, where he offers to be a partner in Phil's businesses, as they would make a formidable partnership, Phil has no choice but to accept. When Derek asks Michael's half-brothers, Anthony (Matt Lapinskas) and Tyler (Tony Discipline) for £4000 that they owe him for selling some of his goods, they are unable to pay. Still not having the money to pay, Derek orders them to retrieve copper wire from train tracks but the police are called by Michael which leads to Derek's arrest. He is released without charge and confronts Anthony and Tyler, saying that somebody called the police and because he is still on probation, he is being watched closer and can no longer continue with his dodgy deals. Janine eventually pays off the debt, but Derek gives Michael a beating as well. Derek continues with his criminal behaviour, getting Max to sell a stolen car for him, and getting Alfie Moon (Shane Richie) to help him with a tax scam, selling alcohol in The Queen Victoria public house that they will claim is being bought for sale in Europe. Roxy Mitchell (Rita Simons) and Alfie then attempt to intercept the alcohol deliveries to cut Derek out of the scam. Derek urges Jack to fight dirty to get custody of his daughter Amy Mitchell from her mother Roxy, lying to him that he has a daughter, Chrissy. Derek asks one of his contacts, Andy (Chris Reilly), to scare Roxy into giving Jack custody of Amy, and when Andy tells Derek that Roxy has taken his alcohol, Derek asks Andy to deliver Roxy a message, implied to be that he wants her dead, to make sure Amy stays with the Brannings. Andy knows the Mitchells and does not want to get on the wrong side of them, so pays Roxy the cash that Derek paid him. Derek is then led to believe that Roxy is missing, and Jack is furious at Derek, and especially when he discovers Chrissy does not exist.

When Phil is released from prison, he promptly tells Derek that he no longer needs him to run his businesses. Phil also warns Alfie not to store any more of Derek's goods at The Queen Victoria public house. At a poker game, Phil resoundingly wins against Derek, but Derek claims it is impossible to win all the time, you just have to pick the right battles. Derek arranges with Alfie and Billy Mitchell (Perry Fenwick) to steal a large amount of alcohol. However he is unknowingly scammed by Alfie and Billy, and suspects Phil of conning him. Derek realises that Roxy has fallen in love with Alfie, so deliberately sends Alfie off on a job and makes it look to Roxy that he killed Alfie. When Alfie returns safe, Roxy tries to punch Derek for the humiliation he caused her but is restrained by Alfie.

Carol's daughter Bianca (Patsy Palmer) is arrested for stealing, and goes to prison in Suffolk. Carol promptly relocates to Suffolk with Bianca's children, However, she allows Derek to move in while they are gone temporarily, and Derek shares the house with Bianca's stepdaughter Whitney (Shona McGarty) and her boyfriend, Tyler. Derek confronts a young woman who appears to be following him, accusing her of being the police. It is in fact his estranged daughter, Alice Branning (Jasmyn Banks), who runs away frightened. After she leaves, Derek finds her phone and uses this to track her down, asking her to hear him out. He apologises for abandoning her as an infant and not watching her grow up. Alice admits that she should not have bothered tracking him down, but Derek asks her to meet with him the next week so he can introduce her to his family, telling her he is a good man who has done bad things. Derek organises a party for Alice so she can meet the family, but just before the party is about to start, Derek is questioned by the police about some stolen alcohol. They do not find the alcohol, and when Derek returns to see Alice, she is already leaving. Derek is angry to discover that Tanya spoke to Alice and scared her away. However, Alice decides to visit, but leaves after revealing that Tanya has spoken to her, in turn Derek states that Tanya is demented and nasty. Derek later threatens to kill Tanya if she says anything else to Alice. Cora shows Alice a favourable letter Derek wrote, so Alice decides to get to know him. He promises to live a crime-free life, but Alice leaves when she discovers he has been dealing in forged banknotes. Derek then decides to pretend that he has changed. When Lucy Beale (Hetti Bywater) calls Derek's probation officer, saying he is in possession of illegal alcohol, Derek takes revenge by taking money from the tills in Lucy's absent father Ian Beale's (Adam Woodyatt) businesses. Derek's son Joey Branning (David Witts) arrives, hitting Derek. Joey tries to get Alice away from Derek but fails, even after goading Derek into becoming extremely angry. Eventually, Joey cons Derek out of money, which he pays to Lucy. Derek dislikes Alice's relationship with Anthony. The two men play poker, and Anthony bets his business, losing it to Derek. Derek then forces Anthony to leave Walford, leaving Alice upset and angry. She decides to move out but changes her mind when Derek promises not to interfere in her life again. Derek then becomes business partners with Tyler. Derek gives Alice a mobile phone, he is later unhappy when she gets a make-over, and upsets her so much that she goes leaves, where outside she is mugged. Derek blames Tanya for giving her the makeover. He inadvertently reveals to Tanya's friend Sharon Rickman's (Letitia Dean) son Dennis (Harry Hickles) the truth about how his father died, so Tanya tells Derek to stay away from her family. Max agrees, so Derek threatens to tell Tanya Max's secret. Alice then tells Derek that it was the 'phone that caused the mugging and forces him to apologise to Tanya. Derek then guilt-trips Max into making him his best man for his upcoming second wedding to Tanya. Max later tells Derek that Jack is his best man which Derek pretends to take well but is actually hurt. A letter is sent to Carol from David but Derek hides it from her when she returns.

Derek continues to remind Max about his secret, telling him that "they" want more money, and saying he will help as long as he throws Joey out, who is living with Max and his family. Derek discovers that Joey is in a relationship with Lauren, his cousin. Lauren decides she and Joey have to leave Walford, and steal Derek's car. She crashes it into a shop and Derek rescues her and Joey from the building before it explodes. Derek convinces Joey to take the blame to spare Lauren going to jail as she was drunk. Derek then blackmails Joey, telling him to either break up with Lauren or live with Derek and be a doting son, or he will tell the police the truth. Joey decides he hates Derek more than he loves Lauren so ends the relationship. Derek also blackmails Tanya, saying he will tell Max she knew about Joey and Lauren's relationship if she does not convince Joey to stay in Walford. Derek continues to alienate Max and Jack by appointing himself as the new best man for the wedding, and further upsets Jack and his girlfriend Sharon when he discovers Sharon's addiction to painkillers. Derek is beaten up by men involved with Max's secret, and Max gives him money for his honeymoon to pay them off, but Derek does not give it to them. Derek blackmails Tanya again, this time into making Joey leave Walford. At Max's stag party, it is revealed that Kat Moon (Jessie Wallace) has been having an affair with Derek. Kat goes home with him and they talk about what has just happened. Derek tells her he loves her. Kat finds a message on his phone that she left for him telling him to leave her alone. Derek says he will play it to her husband Alfie but instead he plays a message in which Kat says she wants to see Derek while Alfie is asleep. Alfie punches Derek, warning him never to return to The Queen Victoria, and hands him his wedding ring.

Derek is confronted by Max who tells him that after Christmas Day, he wants nothing to do with him. Derek arrives at the Branning house for Christmas dinner as head of the family, bringing Kat with him. He is constantly undermined by Max and is shown dislike from many of those present. Kat learns that Derek played Alfie a different message, and then discovers that Derek has deleted all the messages, so she slaps him. As an act of revenge on Max, Derek calls the person involved in Max's secret, and she arrives moments before Max and Tanya are due to remarry. She introduces herself as Kirsty Branning (Kierston Wareing), Max's wife, whom he married while staying with Derek in 2011. It is revealed that Derek never handed Kirsty Max's divorce papers or the money that Max was giving to her, but allowed Max to think they were divorced, and did not tell Max about Kirsty's pregnancy, instead telling Kirsty that Max wanted the child aborted, which she did. A massive argument ensues and Derek shouts at Max and Jack, saying he has never liked Max and he was the person who locked him in a coffin as a child (Max had believed it was Jim). Derek is forced out of the house by Max, Jack and Joey, while Kat watches on. Before making one last threat, he suddenly suffers a heart attack on the street and dies.

== Reception ==
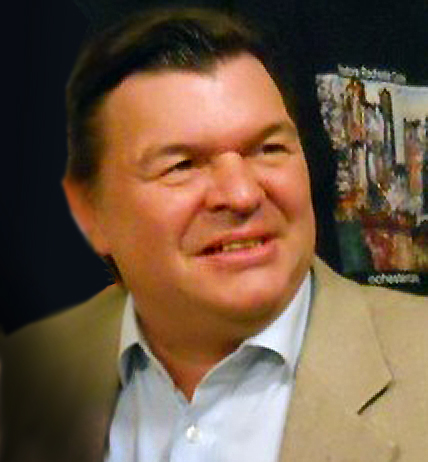
Jamie Foreman (pictured) was nominated for Best Newcomer 2012 and Best Villain from the All About Soap Awards and Derek is often described as "dodgy" and a "psycho".

For his portrayal of Derek, Foreman earned a nomination for Best Newcomer at the 2012 British Soap Awards. While the character received a nomination for Best Villain from the All About Soap Awards. BT's Tim Guest described Derek as "dodgy" and branded him a "psycho." The Guardian's Stuart Heritage called Derek Max's "malevolently pudding-faced newcomer brother." Tony Stewart of the Daily Mirror described Derek's arrival: "What a busy time bad boy Derek Branning has of it. He terrorises Roxy, sleeps with Rainie and then turfs out some squatters for Janine. "Some men are born rotten," Fat Pat declares. "Derek's one of the worst." Stewart later called Derek a "vicious and sadistic thug" and despite criticising some of the character's storylines, described Foreman's performance in the role as "superb." He also said "wearing a heavy overcoat and a 1920s-style newsboy flat cap, Derek looks as though he could easily be one of Al Capone's hoodlum". He also added that Derek may be the "most vicious villain in Soapland". Kate White from Inside Soap named Derek as the best new soap opera character of 2011. She added that the "brutish Derek stormed into Albert Square and scared the bejesus out of everyone". The Guardian's Sarah Dempster said that Derek played by Foreman has the "face of a dyspeptic pug and the charm of an abandoned Threshers." She added: "Within seconds of his arrival the bastard was crashing through the Square like a herniated tank, spraying wide-boy aphorisms everywhere, insulting Pat's earrings, calling Michael Moon's handshake "a bit mincey" and banging on about his time "inside" and ow fings ain't wot they used to be wot wiv the lack of "respect" and the current proliferation of Liffooanians."

Jane Simon of the Daily Mirror states that Jamie Foreman is the "best thing to happen to EastEnders in years." She compared Derek and David Wicks, saying that Derek looks exactly like a "shorter, fatter, cartoon version of David drawn by someone with a cruel sense of humour." Jim Shelley, also from the Daily Mirror, called Derek the "long-lost villainous brother" and a "rough diamond". He also said that Derek is the "sort of bloke who has a lock-up full of 'moody' merchandise". He also added that Derek is nothing like Dirty Den, Johnny Allen, Steve Owen, Jack, Max or "Whispering David Essex". He continues to write: "Derek is thoroughly unpleasant: a pig’s head in Brylcreem. He looks so much like one of the Krays he’s practically walking round with a cardboard cut out of Mad Frankie Fraser." Shelley also nicknamed him "Derek the Menace." Jake Wood said that Foreman is "fantastic" to work with and that his character has had a "huge impact" on the show. Foreman stated that Derek is worse than any gangster he has ever known.

Upon the announcement that Derek was to show a "softer side", a writer from Soaplife said that Derek was certainly not a "baddie we love to hate" and more of a "baddie we [just] hate". They questioned whether Derek could even pull off a soft side and predicted that the transition would be like watching "a speeding car screeching and skidding into a U-turn". Carena Crawford from All About Soap said that Derek needed to ditch his "ridiculous" flat cap, which made him look more like Del Boy than David Beckham. Crawford opined that while Derek was turning the Brannings into the Kray twins; she would advise him steer clear of Phil. The latter has outlived many gangsters and Derek was not "even half as menacing as some of them were". The writer also predicted that their feud would generate weeks of "fuming facial expressions and gurning glances as they vie to become ruler of Walford". David Brown from Radio Times said that Derek "connives like an East End Jabba the Hutt" in his scheme to prevent Carol from leaving. Another writer for the Daily Mirror wrote, "Call Dirty Derek Branning an over-protective father, or just a psychopath, but Lucy isn't safe when he wants revenge because she spiked his precious daughter Alice's drinks last week." Kyle O'Sullivan from the Daily Mirror called Derek "One of the nastiest EastEnders villains to ever grace our screens" and noted his "fierce rivalry" with David.

== See also ==
- List of soap opera villains
- "Who's Been Sleeping with Kat?"
