= Alan Jackson (EastEnders) =

Fictional character from EastEnders

- EastEnders character
- Portrayed by: Howard Antony
- Duration: 1993–1997, 2010
- First appearance: Episode 917; 16 November 1993
- Last appearance: Episode 4094; 26 October 2010
- Created by: Tony McHale
- Introduced by: Leonard Lewis (1993); Bryan Kirkwood (2010)
- Crossover appearances: Bo Selecta (2004)
In-universe information
- Occupation: Plumber
- Family: Jackson/Branning
- Brothers: Malcolm Jackson
- Wife: Carol Branning (1996–1999)
- Sons: Billie Jackson; Kai Jackson
- Stepsons: Robbie Jackson
- Stepdaughters: Bianca Jackson; Sonia Fowler
- Grandmothers: Blossom Jackson

Alan Jackson is a fictional character from the BBC soap opera EastEnders, played by Howard Antony. He originally appeared between 16 November 1993 and 16 October 1997, and returned on 12 October 2010 for three episodes.

Kind-hearted Alan gives the Jackson family some much needed stability. He loves and cares for Carol Jackson's (Lindsey Coulson) children as if they are his own. Their relationship does not go so smoothly however. Carol's stubborn and nagging nature eventually drives him into the arms of another woman.

== Creation and development ==
Alan as he appeared in the 1990s.

1994 was a historic year for EastEnders, as in April, a third weekly episode was introduced. Due to the programme's increased frequency, a number of new characters were introduced to the regular cast in the latter part of 1993 and early 1994. Among them were the Jackson family: mother Carol Jackson (Lindsey Coulson), her four children, Bianca (Patsy Palmer), Robbie (Dean Gaffney), Sonia (Natalie Cassidy), and Billie Jackson (Devon Anderson), as well as Carol's partner Alan Jackson (Howard Antony). Though Carol and Alan were not initially married in the serial, and though Alan was only the biological father of Billie, the whole family took on Alan's surname. The family was created by writer Tony McHale. None of the actors cast as the Jackson family were matched for appearance or screen compatibility. Cassidy has commented, "it was all decided without doing that. I don't think it particularly mattered that none of us Jackson kids looked like each other because all our characters had different dads!"

Various members of the family began to appear sporadically from November 1993 onwards, but in episodes that aired early in 1994, the Jacksons moved from Walford Towers, a block of flats, to the soap's focal setting of Albert Square. Their slow introduction was a deliberate attempt by the programme makers to introduce the whole family over a long period. The Jacksons have been described by EastEnders scriptwriter Colin Brake as a "classic problem family".

Alan has been described as a good, reliable, hard-working father and well integrated into his community. Alan's main storyline during his initial four years in EastEnders surrounded his interracial marriage to Carol Jackson and being a paternal figure to Carol's children, three of whom were fathered by other men. Antony has revealed that his portrayal was partly based on his own life experiences, as he had grown up with siblings with different fathers to his own. Antony told author Larry Jaffee, "Alan was so family oriented, but I liked that a young black guy who was very responsible, mature - that was something that I was very comfortable with because it was something I grew up with to a point. To me, if you love someone you love everything about them. It's not 'I love you, but I don't love your kids'. It was something I was very glad to do. The whole black-and-white thing, I think we're at a stage now that people are more informed."

In 1997, Lindsey Coulson quit her role as Carol, and the majority of the Jackson clan were written out of the serial to facilitate her desire to leave. This was only temporary however, and many of the Jacksons returned shortly after. Antony opted not to re-new his contract. At the time it was reported that he had grown disillusioned with the storylines his character had been given, in particular an affair Alan had with home-wrecker Frankie Pierre (Syan Blake). Antony is quoted saying "There are those above me who make decisions for my character and they're not always ones I like. There were certain aspects of the Frankie story I didn't like. I was frustrated with Alan taking so much nonsense. I thought 'Why are you investing time in Frankie when the woman you've been with for nine years [Carol] wants you back? As an actor it was a difficult pill to swallow. I've had a great time in EastEnders, but the future looks bright."

In 2003, Antony told Jaffee that when he originally quit he intended to return, but decided against it on his agent's advice: "They said the character is incredibly popular, and we are going to bring you back. I said to myself at the time that I had only wanted to do three years, so having done four I thought it might be a good time to see what the big wide world had in store for me. I was worried about getting typecast as well. I'd saved enough money, so I didn't really need to go back."

Actor Devon Anderson reprised his childhood role as Billie Jackson in 2010 but producer Bryan Kirkwood made the decision to kill Billie off that year and Alan was reintroduced for three episodes as part of the storyline in October that year. He attended Billie's funeral.

== Storylines ==
=== Backstory ===
Alan was 20, single and a plumber when he met Carol Branning (Lindsey Coulson). He came to her council flat to unblock her sink and they started dating each other soon after. Carol had gone through a lifetime of struggle and heartache. In the past, the fathers of her three children, Bianca (Patsy Palmer), Robbie (Dean Gaffney) and Sonia (Natalie Cassidy), had all deserted her, but Alan was different and he stuck around, giving the family real stability. Soon he had added to her collection of children, fathering Billie (Devon Anderson) in 1988. Even though Alan and Carol were not married initially, the whole family took Alan's surname. They were later joined by Alan's grandmother, Blossom (Mona Hammond).

=== 1993–2010 ===
When Alan arrives in Walford with his family, he is unemployed and although he does odd jobs for his neighbours, his inability to bring in a regular wage causes conflict between him and Carol. He gets a job working on Mark Fowler's (Todd Carty) fruit and veg stall but neglects to inform the Job Centre that he is working. Market inspector Richard Cole (Ian Reddington) reports him for benefit fraud, causing him to lose his benefits. Alan also fixes cars for David Wicks (Michael French) but is fired following a series of thefts, which eventually turn out to be Robbie's doing. Alan is furious to be branded a thief and his anger towards David increases soon after when he sees Carol spending time with him. Alan accuses Carol of having an affair, unaware that David is actually Bianca's biological father. Upon discovering this, Alan becomes extremely jealous and is annoyed that Carol kept it from him, finding Bianca and David's father/daughter relationship hard to take.

In 1996, Carol and Alan attend the wedding of Carol's sister, April Branning (Debbie Arnold) to Nikos (Yorgos Glastras). Carol's father Jim Branning (John Bardon) and her brother, Derek (Terence Beesley) are opposed to their interracial relationship, constantly trying to provoke Alan into violence. Despite Carol's family's prejudices, Alan and Carol decide to marry, taking April's slot at the church after she is jilted. After the ceremony, Alan is attacked by a drunken Derek, who has come simply to cause trouble. David intervenes and beats up Derek, making Alan and Carol grateful. However, cracks begin to show in their relationship. Money is a concern for Carol and her constant nagging about Alan's inability to provide drives him into the arms of another woman. Alan catches the eye of singer Frankie Pierre (Syan Blake), who does everything she can to seduce him. Despite Alan's initial protests, he soon succumbs and they have sex. Alan regrets it and tries to call off the affair, but Frankie is hell-bent on destroying his marriage, and threatens to tell Carol unless he leaves her. When this does not work, Frankie plants lingerie in Alan's clothes and leaves her personal effects around his house. Carol inevitably discovers them and realises what has been occurring. She is furious and after an argument, Alan leaves and moves in with Frankie.

The separation causes Carol to reignite her romance with David, infuriating Alan. Frankie soon gets bored of Alan and her history of chasing unobtainable men and losing interest once she has them is revealed. Dumped by Carol and Frankie, Alan becomes severely depressed and his attempts to reconcile with his wife are constantly rejected. Things alter after Robbie is beaten up by Ted Hills (Brian Croucher). Alan provides Carol with much-needed support and defends her family, which eventually leads to a reconciliation. In 1997, Billie is the only witness to an armed robbery at a building society. He is kidnapped in order to prevent him testifying in court, leaving Alan and Carol frantic with worry. Billie is returned safely but the Jackson family (bar Bianca and Robbie) are placed in a witness protection programme and leave Walford for their safety. However, terror that Billie will disappear again causes Alan to have a nervous breakdown, which leads to him and Carol splitting up again off-screen. Carol gets engaged to a new man, Dan Sullivan (Craig Fairbrass), but this ends after Dan has an affair with Bianca. Alan and Carol later reunite and live in Balham with Billie and Blossom.

By February 2010, Carol and Alan have split once again. When Sonia returns to Walford, it is suggested that Alan has a new partner and now lives in Forest Hill. In October 2010, Alan comes to Walford to see Billie, not knowing that he has died from alcohol poisoning. Carol avoids him and Bianca tells him before he leaves. He returns for Billie's funeral where Carol tries to kiss him but he rejects her and reminds her that he is now married. He attends Billie's wake with his wife and their son, Kai, and they leave afterwards with Blossom.

== Reception ==
According to author Stephen Bourne, Alan was viewed critically by the black community, stating that his "goodness made him terribly boring" and his affair with Frankie was "implausible".
