= David Janson =

British actor

- Born: David Jackson; 30 March 1950 (age 76); London, England
- Occupation: Actor
- Years active: 1964–present
- Spouse: Debbie Arnold (m. 1989; div. 2002)
- Children: 2; including Ciara

David Janson (born David Jackson, 30 March 1950) is an English actor and theatre director whose stage debut was in Oliver! in 1962. He joined the Royal Shakespeare Company in 1963 in A Midsummer Night's Dream and appeared as the young boy (during Ringo's walk) in The Beatles film A Hard Day's Night (billed as "David Jaxon").

== Notable roles ==
Janson became well known for his role as Jimmy Harker in the 1960s British soap opera The Newcomers. He later starred in the sitcom Get Some In!. He also replaced Richard Gibson as the Gestapo officer Herr Otto Flick in the BBC sitcom 'Allo 'Allo! in its final 1992 series, after playing Adolf Hitler's double in an episode of series 8.

He has also appeared in a variety of other roles including in Softly, Softly, Doomwatch, Jason King, Dixon of Dock Green, Z-Cars, Brush Strokes, T-Bag Strikes Again, Ever Decreasing Circles, the postman in Keeping Up Appearances, The Upper Hand and Don't Rock the Boat.

In 2019 he directed the stage show Hormonal Housewives.

== Personal life ==
Janson was married to actress Debbie Arnold, who played April Branning in the BBC One soap opera EastEnders in 1996. They were married for 13 years, divorcing in 2002. The couple have two daughters, including Hollyoaks actress Ciara Janson. The couple worked on the Streamline English as a Foreign Language video series. He played the role of Kevin Smith, with Arnold playing his wife Sharon Smith.

== Television roles ==
Year	Title	Role
1975–1978	Get Some In!	Ken Richardson
1980	Grundy	Murray
1982–1983	Don't Rock the Boat	Billy Hoxton
1987–1988	Brush Strokes	Steve
1991–1992	'Allo 'Allo!	Adolf Hitler double, Herr Otto Flick
1992–1995	Keeping Up Appearances	Michael the Postman
2023	Keeping Up Appearances - 30 Years Of Laughs	Himself
