= Carol Jackson =

Fictional character from EastEnders

- EastEnders character
- Portrayed by: Lindsey Coulson
- Duration: 1993–1997, 1999, 2010–2015
- First appearance: Episode 917; 16 November 1993
- Last appearance: Episode 5148; 2 October 2015
- Created by: Tony McHale
- Introduced by: Leonard Lewis (1993); Matthew Robinson (1999); Diederick Santer (2010)
- Book appearances: Bianca's Secret Diary
- Spin-off appearances: Pudding Lane (1999); Last Tango in Walford (2010)
In-universe information
- Other names: Carol Branning
- Occupation: Launderette assistant; Personal assistant; Bookmaker manager; Waitress; Café manager
- Family: Branning/Jackson
- Father: Jim Branning
- Mother: Reenie Branning
- Stepmother: Dot Cotton
- Brothers: Derek Branning; Max Branning; Jack Branning
- Sisters: April Branning; Suzy Branning
- Husband: Alan Jackson (1996–1999)
- Sons: Robbie Jackson; Billie Jackson
- Daughters: Bianca Jackson; Sonia Fowler
- Grandsons: Liam Butcher; Morgan Butcher; Sami Jackson
- Granddaughters: Tiffany Butcher; Bex Fowler; Julia Fowler; Whitney Dean (adoptive)
- Nephews: Bradley Branning; Oscar Branning; Joey Branning; Ricky Branning; James Branning; Kevin
- Nieces: Lauren Branning; Abi Branning; Alice Branning; Penny Branning; Amy Mitchell; Rebecca; Annie Carter
- Other relatives: Louie Beale; Jimmy Beale; Abi Branning Jnr; Charli Slater; Dolly Dean-Hudson (adoptive)

Carol Jackson (also Branning) is a fictional character from the BBC soap opera EastEnders, played by Lindsey Coulson. The character was introduced in 1993 as the mother of the Jackson family. Coulson decided to quit the role in 1997, but she returned temporarily in 1999 within a storyline that contributed to both the introduction of her boyfriend Dan Sullivan (Craig Fairbrass) and the departure of her daughter Bianca (Patsy Palmer); in the storyline, Carol discovers that Bianca had previously had a relationship with Dan and they resumed their affair – which prompted her to end her relationship with Dan, disown Bianca, and leave the square on her own.

On 25 October 2009, it was confirmed that she would return along with other members of the Jackson family – Sonia (Natalie Cassidy), Robbie (Dean Gaffney) and Billie Jackson (Devon Anderson) – on 15 February 2010, although her first appearance in 2010 is in EastEnders: Last Tango in Walford, an episode released exclusively to DVD on 8 February 2010. Coulson chose to leave the show for a third time in June 2015, with her exit airing on 2 October 2015.

Carol is depicted as a tough, working-class grafter, fiercely defensive of her four children. Her storylines include relationships with several men including David Wicks (Michael French), eventual husband Alan Jackson (Howard Antony), Connor Stanley (Arinzé Kene), Eddie Moon (David Essex) and Masood Ahmed (Nitin Ganatra), the death of her youngest son Billie, and her breast cancer diagnosis in January 2014.

== Creation ==
1994 was a historic year for EastEnders, as in April, a third weekly episode was introduced. Due to the programme's increased frequency, a number of new characters were introduced to the regular cast in the latter part of 1993 and early 1994. Among them were the Jackson family: mother Carol (Lindsey Coulson), her four children, Bianca (Patsy Palmer), Robbie (Dean Gaffney), Sonia (Natalie Cassidy), and Billie (Devon Anderson), as well as Carol's partner Alan Jackson (Howard Antony). Though Carol and Alan were not initially married in the serial, and though Alan was only the biological father of Billie, the whole family took on Alan's surname. The family was created by writer Tony McHale. None of the actors cast as the Jackson family were matched for appearance or screen compatibility. Cassidy has commented, "it was all decided without doing that. I don't think it particularly mattered that none of us Jackson kids looked like each other because all our characters had different dads!" Carol was Coulson's first major television role.

Various members of the family began to appear sporadically from November 1993 onwards, but in episodes that aired early in 1994, the Jacksons moved from Walford Towers, a block of flats, to the soap's focal setting of Albert Square. Their slow introduction was a deliberate attempt by the programme makers to introduce the whole family over a long period. The Jacksons have been described by EastEnders scriptwriter Colin Brake as a "classic problem family".

== Development ==
=== Characterisation ===
Carol as she appeared in 1993.

In an interview from 1995 that was published by Larry Jaffee in 2009, Coulson described Carol as "fiery, loud and determined". However, Coulson added that she played Carol as possibly more approachable as time progressed, adding, "It's difficult to find a level when you step into a soap, it's so fast-moving. You're not really sure who you are or what you're doing. I think as the actor relaxes, maybe the character softens a little. Everybody's trying to find their level." Author Kate Lock has suggested that "Carol always looked careworn and sounded snappish, but then, as pointed out repeatedly, she's had to make a lot of sacrifices in her life, raising four kids single-handedly, missing out on any chance of a career". Carol is depicted as a grafter who is fiercely protective of her problematic children. Discussing Carol's role as a mother, Coulson has said, "I think a lot of mothers find their adolescent children hard work, and with four children well, what more can I say? She's out working, trying to get money. She's always tired - it's hard being a mum." Coulson argued with the production team over Carol's attire. She felt that Carol should not have a bad dress sense just because she is poor.

"[Carol's] image was that of a single mother [...] keeping her family together and having a life of her own was Carol's role in life. She followed in the tradition of Elsie Tanner [from ITV soap opera Coronation Street], but because she was a woman from the 1990s, her children were from a number of fathers and her strength as a mother was that she had kept her children together. Life was hard for Carol, and while she experienced a varied life she always struggled to maintain her independence and sexuality. One always felt that Carol Jackson was a smouldering sexual woman for whom the experience of motherhood and the time spent looking after her children had necessitated her leaving her sexuality on hold, ready to be reignited at some time in the future."

— Author Dorothy Hobson's profile of Carol. (2003)

=== David Wicks ===
In the character's backstory, Carol became pregnant with Bianca and her boyfriend David Wicks (Michael French) moved away. A sixteen-year-old Carol faced life as a single mother. His mother, Pat Butcher (Pam St Clement), never forgave David for sleeping with Carol. The feud between the Jackson and Butcher families became a prominent storyline in December 1994. Bianca's boyfriend was Pat's step-son Ricky Butcher (Sid Owen) and those who knew about Bianca's paternity were desperate to keep the duo apart. Both Carol and Pat invite Ricky around for Christmas dinner, but he planned to bring the two warring clans together. Owen told Victoria Ross from Inside Soap that Ricky convinces Carol to call a truce and invite Pat and David over for Christmas dinner. She agrees for Bianca's sake and they all gather in Carol's home. However, Owen warned that the feud may never end: "I don't think it's possible for Pat and Carol to become friends very easily because too much has been said on both sides." St. Clement claimed that Pat is willing to use violence; she added that Pat "will do anything to protect her family. It just takes someone like Carol Jackson to bring it out."

Carol's family secret is revealed in 1994. When they first meet, David develops an attraction to Bianca. An Inside Soap writer stated that Carol "flipped" at the sight of Bianca flirting with David. Carol is forced to inform him that he is her father. He vows to keep the secret hidden from Bianca. However, in March 1995, the show played Bianca making a drunken attempt to seduce David and the truth has to be revealed.

Over Christmas 1995, Carol rejects David's advances and he remains solitary over the festive period. David thinks that Carol still has feelings for him. David enjoys meddling in other characters' lives and his favourite target is Alan. As an Inside Soap reporter noted, David would have no qualms about destroying what he cannot have. French told the reporter that "I think it'd be nice if David ended up with Carol. They may be at it hammer and tongs most of the time but the old spark's still there."

=== Alan Jackson ===
Carol is married to Alan Jackson (Howard Antony). Together, they have a son, Billie (Devon Anderson). Alan meets soul-singer Frankie Pierre (Syan Blake) but she has a "scheming" persona. The storyline develops into infidelity when Alan kisses Frankie. Having been with Carol for ten years, Alan feels trapped and enticed into having fun. He then leaves for Spain abandoning Carol and the children. Antony told Simon Timblick from Inside Soap that Alan is trying to discover more about himself and subsequently acts selfishly towards Carol. The actor explained that "he's been in this relationship with Carol all these years, and he hasn't had the chance to go out and have a wild time like most people have." When Alan reflects on his behaviour, he wants Carol back for the sake of the children. But Frankie has trapped him in a dilemma. Author Lock has suggested that it was Carol's "constant bitching" at Alan that caused the affair.

=== Return (1999) ===
In May 1999, it was announced that Coulson would be return to the series, with a new love interest, Dan Sullivan (Craig Fairbrass), and was reported to have been filming scenes on Southend Pier with co-stars Palmer, Gaffney, Cassidy and Owen in scenes that aired the following month.

=== Reintroduction (2010) ===
Having originally appeared between 1993 and 1997 and again in 1999, and despite Coulson ruling out a return to the programme in 2008, it was announced on 25 October 2009 that Carol would return to the show in 2010 with her children Robbie, Sonia and Billie. Coulson is quoted as saying, "I'm thrilled to be returning to EastEnders after all these years. I'm also excited and intrigued to find out what Carol and her family have been up to since we last saw her and where she will be going next." A source told entertainment website Digital Spy: "Everything's being kept hush-hush about the Jacksons' return at the moment, but there are certainly a load of questions to be answered. Will the frosty relationship between Carol and Bianca thaw? Are Sonia and Martin still together? And how will Robbie react when he learns of his beloved Wellard's death? Everyone's so pleased to have them back." The family will return for Bianca's second wedding to Ricky Butcher (Sid Owen) as part of the show's 25th anniversary. Executive producer Diederick Santer explained that he wanted great stories to get people talking, saying "The wedding is the perfect opportunity for us to bring back the much-loved Jackson characters – Carol, Sonia, Robbie and Billie."

=== Grief and reinvention ===
In September 2010 it was revealed that Billie would be killed by alcohol poisoning, leaving Carol devastated. Although Coulson felt Anderson's departure was premature, she praised the storyline's "huge shock value". Coulson felt heartbroken when she was filming Billie's death scenes; of this she stated during an interview with Inside Soap: "When we had to play the scene where Carol sees Billie lying dead in the living room, it was really sad – not just because a mum had lost her son in tragic circumstances, but also because I felt almost as though I was losing Devon too."

Coulson revealed that she was exhausted from playing Carol's grief for a period of six weeks. She added she was pleased because upon her return she had hope for a demanding storyline. Asked how it felt to portray the storyline, Coulson stated: "Incredibly satisfying, For them to give me that lovely storyline is a compliment, and it was wonderful." The storyline progresses into Carol realising Bianca is her biggest support; of this Coulson claims: "I think there's a bit of Bianca going, 'What about me? I'm still here.' Carol's projected so much of her love onto Billie, because nobody else needed her." After the episode aired it received a great deal of praise from fans on Digital Spy.

Carol's grief makes her lash out at those nearest to her and she tries to end her own life by taking an overdose, but later changes her mind. Speaking of the development in the storyline, Coulson commented: "It's a journey Carol goes on and she makes some terrible decisions." Coulson later revealed she wanted Carol to have more friends. Carol is then paired with Glenda Mitchell (Glynis Barber) as they strike an "unlikely friendship" and move in together, after she feels unable to live at the home her son died in. Coulson felt that Carol was reinventing herself; she also stated: "It's a strange pairing, but it'll be interesting to see if they can find common ground." Barber also admitted she is a fan of the pairing, expressed her desire for Glenda to lead Carol astray and stated: "The characters are very different but actually have a lot in common." Coulson has also admitted she felt it important viewers could see how strong Carol can be, she added: "I'd like to show viewers that Carol is strong enough to transcend all of this, because people have to – but it won't just go away."

Carol then starts sleeping with Billie's old friend Connor Stanley (Arinze Kene). Discussing the storyline, Coulson stated: "For her, though, this is a brief moment where she doesn't have to think about Billie's death. It's not even lovely sex – it happens in a fit of loss and grief." Coulson feels at this point Carol crosses a major boundary because he was Billie's friend.

=== Masood Ahmed ===
In 2013, Carol starts a relationship with Masood Ahmed (Nitin Ganatra), which is soon affected by the return of her ex-boyfriend David. Coulson told Jon Peake from TV Choice that Carol had accepted that David had left her and moved on. David's return is unexpected and Coulson stated that he has never been good for her character. She added: "Her heart is probably with David; he was her first love, but as a grown-up woman she should be with Masood – someone who treats her well." David reveals that he missed Carol and it is clear she still cares about him. Coulson believed that Carol hates her feelings and does not want "this complication in her life". Ganatra told Peake that David's manipulative and clever personality develops a rivalry for Carol's attention. He explained that Carol's theme of falling in love with David upsets Masood. He wants reassurance but Carol fails to notice Masood's problem with David and even nurses him following an assault. Ganatra concluded that "he's at the stage where he loves Carol, and then David comes back and ruins everything [...] but she's worth fighting for." Coulson believed that Carol and Masood could have a successful relationship. David finds it more difficult to "play her" because she knows his tricks. She noted that Carol changed and is no longer a victim. David uses his grandchildren Morgan and Tiffany to guilt Carol into letting him stay. Ganatra told Allison Jones that David then causes more trouble – but Carol and Masood are in love, and find each other attractive, and he will fight David for Carol.

=== Breast cancer ===
On 24 November 2013, it was announced that EastEnders would feature breast cancer in December, with Carol finding a lump in her breast. Carol's daughter Sonia will return as the storyline begins. Coulson said, "This is a very important storyline as breast cancer is something that affects so many people. Through Carol's story I hope we can raise awareness of the impact of breast cancer on the people that have it and their families." Executive producer Dominic Treadwell-Collins said: "EastEnders has a long tradition of dealing with social issues and breast cancer is one that the majority of people have been affected by in some way. And this is not just a story about breast cancer. This is a story about women, about mothers and daughters, and ultimately about family. And with Lindsey Coulson, Michael French, Patsy Palmer and Natalie Cassidy giving powerhouse performances at its centre, this is a storyline that will inform, move, and shake up the audience as it shakes up the Jackson family." Producers worked with charities such as Macmillan Cancer Support, whose Head of Health and Social Care, Jacqui Graves, congratulated the show "for helping to raise awareness of the condition."

=== Departure (2015) ===
On 21 June 2015, it was announced that Coulson had decided to leave. Speaking of her departure she said: "I've had a fantastic time playing the formidable Carol Jackson and although I'll miss everything about EastEnders, I feel the time is right for me to move on". Carol's exit aired on 2 October 2015, with Julia's Theme being played as she rides on Jim's motorbike down the market. The episode was watched by 5.6 million viewers on the night of its broadcast.

== Storylines ==
=== 1993–1997 ===
Carol Jackson first came to Albert Square in 1993, working alongside Pauline Fowler (Wendy Richard) as the replacement of her best-friend Dot Cotton (June Brown) in the launderette. She soon moves to the Square with her family, which consists of her partner Alan Jackson (Howard Antony) and his grandmother Blossom Jackson (Mona Hammond) – along with her four children, Bianca (Patsy Palmer), Robbie (Dean Gaffney), Sonia (Natalie Cassidy) and Billie (Devon Anderson), all of whom have different fathers but have taken Alan's surname despite Carol and Alan not being married.

Carol is soon forced to tell her childhood sweetheart, David Wicks (Michael French), that he is Bianca's father when it looks like they are about to start a relationship. David agrees to keep this a secret from Bianca, but is forced to tell her when she tries to seduce him. Carol and Alan attend the wedding of Carol's sister April Branning (Debbie Arnold) to Nikos (Yorgos Glastras), where their father Jim Branning (John Bardon) and brother Derek Branning (Terence Beesley) show their disapproval of Carol and Alan's interracial relationship. After April is jilted by her fiancé, Alan decides he wants to marry Carol there and then. However, Alan grows jealous of Carol's renewed friendship with David and embarks on an affair with singer Frankie Pierre (Syan Blake), moving out of the Jacksons' house, leaving Carol to reignite a romance with David. Both affairs are short lived and Carol and Alan soon reunite.

Billie is the only witness to an armed robbery and is kidnapped to prevent him from testifying in court. He is eventually returned safely, but Carol and the rest of her family (bar Bianca) are placed in a witness protection programme and move away from Walford for their safety.

=== 1999 ===
In her time away, Carol separates from Alan due to his mental breakdown and starts a relationship with Dan Sullivan (Craig Fairbrass). Carol, Robbie and Sonia return to Walford with Dan, and it is revealed that Dan was in a relationship with Bianca when she was 15 and he was married. Bianca keeps this a secret from Carol, but they begin an affair during a family holiday. The affair only ends when Carol becomes pregnant with Dan's baby; however, Carol finds an old photo of Bianca and Dan and quizzes him about it. He tells only part of the truth and says that they had a relationship long before he ever met Carol. Carol believes this but is angry at Bianca for not telling her. Carol confronts Bianca who reveals the affair, not knowing what Dan had said. Carol throws Dan out, tells Bianca's husband Ricky Butcher (Sid Owen) about the affair and disowns her daughter. She aborts Dan's child and leaves Albert Square in October 1999 to care for her critically ill mother, Reenie (Joy Graham), who eventually dies. Following Reenie's funeral, Carol reconciles with Alan and returns to him and Billie in Balham. She tends to her father in 2007 following his stroke, but remains estranged from Bianca and her children.

=== 2010–2015 ===
Carol turns up uninvited to Bianca and Ricky's second wedding to stop her son Billie attending. Despite initial animosity, Carol and Bianca make amends for the past and Carol moves back to Walford, having lost her job in Balham as a school secretary. Billie and Carol regularly clash regarding Carol's controlling parenting and Billie's connection with a gang. When a gang member attempts to shoot Billie, Carol's brother Jack (Scott Maslen) is accidentally shot instead. Blaming himself, Billie joins the army and despite initial opposition, Carol gives her blessing.

Billie is given leave on his birthday, so Carol arranges a party for him and his friends. Copious amounts of alcohol are consumed by Billie and the next day he is found dead on the settee. Distraught, Carol pushes away her family, suggesting they are responsible for Billie's death, until her brother Max (Jake Wood) tells her Billie only joined the army to get away from her. When Carol sees a video on Billie's laptop in which he says she is a control freak and wants her to die, she is devastated. She bans her family from attending Billie's funeral, and it is only she, Alan and Blossom who attend. In her grief, Carol attempts to kiss Alan, but he rejects her as he is now married with a young son. Struck by sadness, Carol plans to commit suicide by overdose, but is interrupted by Connor Stanley (Arinzé Kene), one of Billie's friends and a gang member; they comfort each other and end up having sex. Carol disapproves of Connor's criminality and so their relationship ends and reignites several times. On one break, Connor begins dating Bianca's stepdaughter, Whitney Dean (Shona McGarty). Connor sleeps with Carol and Whitney behind the other's back, until Bianca finds out and attacks Connor with a metal pole. Bianca is imprisoned and Connor's mother Kendra (Sharon D. Clarke) warns Carol to leave Connor alone.

In 2011, Carol meets a love-interest, Eddie Moon (David Essex), but their relationship ends when Carol discovers Eddie has been seeing Vanessa Gold (Zöe Lucker). Old feelings resurface between Carol and David when he returns to Walford in 2012 after years away, to visit his dying mother Pat (Pam St Clement). Derek (now Jamie Foreman) still loathes David because of the rivalry in their youth over David getting Carol pregnant; he forbids Carol and David's reunion. David's feud with Derek escalates to violence. After convincing Carol to leave Walford with him, David changes his mind when he sees how much their grandchildren need her; he devastates Carol by leaving without her.

Upon being released from prison, Bianca struggles to support her family and gets into debt. In desperation, she steals money from a market trader; the police are called and Bianca is sent back to prison, in Suffolk, for six months. Wanting to be near Bianca, Carol temporarily moves to Suffolk with her grandchildren. She returns to prepare for Bianca's return and discovers Derek is using the house for criminal activities. She orders him to get rid of his merchandise, but he just stocks it in the garage. Derek dies of a heart attack.

Carol and Masood Ahmed (Nitin Ganatra) bond and arrange a date, but it is not a success, and Carol starts a relationship with Bianca's probation officer, Steve Lowe (Michael Simkins). Bianca objects and Masood breaks up the relationship on Carol's behalf. Carol and Masood then arrange another date and eventually their relationship becomes more serious. David returns to Walford penniless, so Carol allows him to stay at her house. David attempts to charm Carol again, and tries to interfere in her romance with Masood. This does not work initially and Carol moves in with Masood, but soon moves out. Carol finds a lump in her breast and is diagnosed with breast cancer. She then resumes her relationship with David. After ending her relationship with Masood and a heated argument between David and Masood, Carol visits Sonia and her daughter Rebecca (Jasmine Armfield) to tell her about the cancer. Carol worries about being tested for the BRCA2 gene, rebuffing David's advances and rejecting his marriage proposal, though this leads to David inadvertently revealing to her friends and neighbours that she has cancer. David kisses Nikki Spraggan (Rachel Wilde) but accepts Carol's later proposal of marriage and moves back in with her.

Carol tests positive for the gene, and her daughters are also tested. Sonia has inherited the gene, causing tension between her and Bianca and Carol, who is undergoing intensive chemotherapy, is forced to step in, but she collapses. Carol is told she has an infection because of her weak immune system, but is released and recovers ahead of her upcoming wedding. On the day of the wedding, David disappears to find her "something blue", and Carol believes he is scared by the idea of commitment and jilted her. However, he has suffered a heart attack. Distraught, Carol shares a heart to heart with her long-time employer Ian Beale (Adam Woodyatt) and realises that she and David must be honest with each other. Carol visits David in hospital but they argue and she decides that they cannot continue their relationship. After sharing one last dance to "Misty Blue" — the "something blue" David had promised — he moves out of the home and leaves Walford.

When Carol is due to undergo her mastectomy, Bianca persuades her to only have a single mastectomy. Bianca reveals that the family are in debt, so Carol goes back to work and sells some of her and her family's possessions. Carol confides in her colleague Tina Carter (Luisa Bradshaw-White) about her money problems, and Tina proposes that they sell marijuana. Carol is appalled but later accepts the proposal because of the debt. Carol and Bianca then attend Sonia's health class, where many of the locals try to persuade Carol to have a double mastectomy. This infuriates Carol, but after talking to Pam Coker (Lin Blakley), she decides to have a double mastectomy, much to Sonia's delight, and calls off her marijuana deal with Tina.

While Carol is preparing for her operation, Bianca gets in trouble with social services when Liam accidentally gives Tiffany hash brownies to take to school for the last day of term. When Liam confesses that he got them from the café, Carol realises that the brownies were Tina's and she is dealing drugs despite saying that she was calling the deal with her aunt off. Carol furiously threatens to expose Tina's deals to help Bianca get social services off her back, exposing Tina's actions to her devastated girlfriend, Fiona "Tosh" Mackintosh (Rebecca Scroggs). Carol asks the grandson of her stepmother Dot Branning (June Brown), Charlie Cotton (Declan Bennett), to talk to Liam about what to say with the police, and after he leaves she answers his discarded phone and discovers his supposedly dead father, Dot's estranged son Nick Cotton (John Altman), on the other end of the line. Carol confronts Charlie about deceiving Dot, and despite his pleas for her to keep his actions quiet to salvage his relationship with his grandmother, Carol tells him she will tell Dot after her operation. She then has her double mastectomy, after receiving advice from the hospital's vicar. To try to keep her quiet, Charlie pays off Bianca's debt, and the rest of the Butchers hail him as the family's hero. However, Carol is initially determined that he still needs to tell the truth, until she sees how happy Dot is by his side, and agrees to keep quiet. She orders Charlie to take a DNA test to confirm he is Dot's grandson, which proves positive. She then discovers she no longer has cancer, but is upset that Bianca is planning to move away with her family.

Carol later begins behaving erratically for no apparent reason. During a friendly outing with Billy Mitchell (Perry Fenwick), she drunkenly kisses him and then abruptly walks off. When she catches Liam having sex with Cindy Williams (Mimi Keene), she allows it despite Sonia's protests. Wanting to understand Carol better, Sonia has a counsellor visit her. Carol then admits to the counsellor, who also had a double mastectomy, that she is scared of her cancer possibly coming back. Later, Carol finds out that Jim has died. Despite wanting to tell Dot, she ends up putting off her visit and concentrating on organizing Jim's clothes and then her work in the café. It soon becomes apparent that she is unable to process her grief properly, due to some resentment to Jim, when she lashes out at Max, and Whitney, Liam and Sonia's daughter Rebecca catch her doing so. Carol later befriends Buster Briggs (Karl Howman), but when Buster's girlfriend, Shirley Carter (Linda Henry), sees them together, she punches Carol. When Carol is informed of the option for breast reconstruction, she rejects her family and has drinks with Buster at his and Shirley's home. When she admits that she wishes she had remained rebellious and adventurous after having her children, Buster encourages her to make her own free choices and she returns home later as a more rebellious woman, alienating her family. Later in the day, Shirley finds a bra behind her sofa, and confronts Carol, who lies that she had sex with Buster. She later admits it was a lie to Shirley, who helps her come to terms with her mastectomy scars to regain her confidence.

Carol is upset when Max is charged with the murder of Lucy Beale (Hetti Bywater) (see "Who Killed Lucy Beale?") and starts drinking when unable to raise legal fees. She is angered by gossip and loses faith in Max's innocence when Lucy's blood is found on his shoes, particularly when he does not defend Abi. She soon realises the extent of Max's innocence when many of his insecurities are brought to light during the trial. After coming home the same day from court, she is surprised to find Robbie in her kitchen. Robbie tries to persuade Carol to go and live in Milton Keynes with him and Bianca, but Carol refuses and decides to go on the run with Max, who has escaped from court after being found guilty, however, Max is arrested before they can. Recent events culminate in Carol realising that she will always be relied upon by her family; she decides to take her father's motorbike and ride away from Walford, not knowing where she will end up, embracing her newfound freedom. Before she leaves, she buys a dog for Robbie and his son Sami Jackson (Shiven Shankar), named Wellard II (Panther). Carol visits Tiffany in Germany in December 2022 and therefore cannot attend Dot's funeral; however, she inherits Dot's engagement ring.

== Reception ==
In March 1995, a reporter from Inside Soap said "The Square's toughest mum, and David's ex-girlfriend Carol Jackson, has got a few secrets of her own, considering she's had four children by four different men." They predicted that it would not be long before Carol's past caught up with her. In July 2015, Gary Gillatt of Inside Soap praised Coulson's acting as Carol came to terms with her mental and physical scars following her mastectomy, "Wasn't Lindsey Coulson amazing in EastEnders this week? The script was uncompromising, the acting first rate. Bravo EastEnders!"

Since Carol's exit in 1999, writer Dorothy Hobson used Carol's continued absence on-screen despite numerous upsets in her children's lives as indicative of lack of realism in soaps. She believed Carol's absence during Sonia's motherhood detracted from the storyline. She added "you knew she might be judgemental towards Sonia, but she would have sorted out her problems and supported her as a mother."

Coulson was nominated for "Best Supporting Actress" at the 1997 Inside Soap Awards. She was nominated in the Best Serial Drama Performance category at the 16th National Television Awards in 2011 for her portrayal of Carol. Coulson won 'Best Dramatic' performance at the 2000 British Soap Awards. She was also nominated for 'Best Actress' and 'Best Dramatic Performance' at the 2011 awards, and for 'Best Actress' at the 2011 Inside Soap Awards. In March 2011, EastEnders won in the Soaps and Continuing Drama category at the Royal Television Society Programme Awards, and the judges praised Coulson's portrayal of Carol, saying the soap was "A real class above the rest with a stunning central performance from Lindsey Coulson." Anne Leask from the Sunday Mirror branded Carol a "dark and brooding put-upon single mum" who was desperate to get married.

During the episode dated 30 July 2015, Carol visited Max in prison. Carol called Max a "bastard", which sparked complaints. In 2020, Sara Wallis and Ian Hyland from The Daily Mirror placed Carol 48th on their ranked list of the Best EastEnders characters of all time, calling her a "tough-as-boots mum who'd punch your lights out if you crossed her". Kyle O'Sullivan from the same publication called Carol "Fierce, loud and determined".
