= Russell Floyd =

English actor (born 1962)

Russell Floyd (born 29 May 1962 in Croydon, London, England) is a British actor. After graduating from RADA, he played Rick in three episodes of London's Burning as firefighter Sally Reid's swimming instructor. He then played Bridge Street market inspector Michael Rose in the BBC soap opera EastEnders from 1996 to 1999, and DC Ken Drummond in the ITV police drama The Bill from 2002 to 2005. He also played a detective in the Sky One football drama Dream Team in 2005. He appeared in the BBC medical drama Doctors in 2006 and 2010 in unrelated roles. He also starred in the BBC drama Casualty in 2007. Moreover, he has done some voice acting in The Snow Queen and The Snow Queen's Revenge.

He appeared in two plays in 2009 – Maggie's End at the Shaw Theatre in London in April, and The Bullet at The Open House, Brighton in May.

He played Don Arden in All or Nothing, the mod musical, which toured the UK in 2016 and 2017.

He lives in Brighton with his wife, Lucie, and has two children, Gabriel and Zara.
