= Maggie O'Neill =

English actress

Maggie O’Neill
- Born: Margaret O'Neill; 15 November 1962 (age 63); Buckinghamshire, England
- Occupation: Actress
- Years active: 1985–present
- Known for: Peak Practice (2000–2002); Shameless (2004–2007); EastEnders (2008)

Margaret O'Neill (born 15 November 1962) is an English actress. She is known for her television roles in Peak Practice (2000–2002), Shameless (2004–2007), EastEnders (2008) and Two Doors Down (2019 and 2023). In 1986 she appeared in the music video for Simply Red's single "Holding Back The Years". In 1988 she appeared in the film Gorillas in the Mist.

== Biography ==
The youngest of six Catholic brothers and sisters born to head-teacher parents, O'Neill grew up in the Midlands, where she was educated at a convent school, and, after being inspired by a sixth-form drama teacher, "fell" into acting.

After training at the Guildhall School of Music and Drama, she starred in the video for Simply Red's "Holding Back the Years" in 1986, and made her professional stage debut in Moving Pictures by Stephen Lowe at the West Yorkshire Playhouse in Leeds in 1985. After making her first professional screen appearance in the British production Mona Lisa with Bob Hoskins in 1986, she played her maiden Hollywood part in the Sigourney Weaver film Gorillas in the Mist in 1988. She acted with Keith Barron and Annette Crosbie in the 1989 TV series Take Me Home.

O'Neill played Alex Redman in ITV's medical drama Peak Practice and Sheila Jackson in Channel 4's comedy drama Shameless. O'Neill also appeared in the "Straw Woman" episode of Midsomer Murders and played Max and Jack Branning's sister Suzy in the soap opera EastEnders for five months in 2008. As a voice actress, O'Neill voiced companion Captain Lysandra Aristedes in Doctor Who Big Finish Productions audio dramas.

== Filmography ==
- Mona Lisa (1986) as Girl in Paradise Club
- Wherever You Are... (1988) as Julian's second wife
- Gorillas in the Mist (1988) as Kim
- Defrosting the Fridge (1988, TV)
- Jim Henson's The Storyteller – Greek Myths (TV) {Theseus and the Minotaur} as Ariadne
- Take Me Home BBC – Three Part TV Drama (1989, TV) as Kathy
- Seven Minutes (1989) as Berta
- Inspector Morse (1991, TV) in episode "Fat Chance" as Hilary Dobson
- Under Suspicion (1991) as Hazel Aaron
- Boon (1991, TV) in episode "Lie of the Land" as Amanda Shepley
- The Life and Times of Henry Pratt (1992) TV
- Friday on My Mind (1992) BBC TV as Louise
- When Pigs Fly (1993) as Sheila
- Cadfael (1994, TV) in episode "One Corpse Too Many" as Aline Siward
- All Men Are Mortal (1995) as Florence
- Killing Me Softly (1995, TV) as Sara Thornton
- The Fix (1997, TV) as Marina Kay
- Invasion: Earth (1998, TV) as Amanda Tucker
- Births, Marriages and Deaths (1999) as Alex
- Hero of the Hour (2000, TV) as Alison Liddle
- Peak Practice (2001, 2002, TV) as Alex Redman
- White Teeth (2002, TV) as Poppy Burt-Jones
- Murder in Mind (2002, TV) in episode "Rage"
- Blue Murder (2004) in episode "Lonely" (TV) as Matilda Urwin
- Shameless (2004–2007, TV) as Sheila Jackson
- Midsomer Murders (2004, TV) in episode "The Straw Woman" as Agnes Waterhouse.
- Wild at Heart (2007) as Elaine
- Mansfield Park (2007) as Mrs Norris
- Little Devil (2007, TV) as Laura Crowe
- The Royal (2007, TV) as Jane Cooper in episode #2.5
- EastEnders (2008, TV) as Suzy Branning (55 episodes)
- New Tricks (2010, TV) in episode "Gloves Off" as Ronni Mayfair
- Inspector George Gently (2012, TV) in episode "Gently Northern Soul" as Matilda Braithwaite
- Truckers (2013, TV) as Sue
- A Gert Lush Christmas (2015, TV) as Aunty Jade
- Death in Paradise (2016) as Perrie Campbell episode #5.8
- The Halcyon (2017, TV) as Gloria episode #1.4
- Midsomer Murders (2018, TV) in episode #19.6, "The Curse of the Ninth" as Audrey Glenhill.
- Unforgotten as Ellen Price episodes #2.4 & #2.5
- Call the Midwife (2018) as Mae Stanton episode #7.2
- Father Brown as Mrs. Kendall in episode #7.9 “The Skylark Scandal" (2019)
- Two Doors Down (2019 & 2023) as Sandra
- White Lines (2020) as Yoana
- Casualty (2021) as Cindy
- Sweet Sue (2023) as Sue

== Other appearances ==
- Simply Red, "Holding Back the Years" (1985, music video) as the young teacher
- Clock Opera, "The Lost Buoys" (2012, music video) as the wife
