= Howard Antony =

British actor (b. 1963)

- Born: 19 April 1963 (age 61); Paddington, London, England
- Occupation: Actor
- Years active: 1987–present

Howard Antony (born 19 April 1963) is a British actor, best known for playing the role of Alan Jackson, in the BBC soap opera EastEnders from 1993 to 1997 and briefly again in 2010. He left EastEnders and went on to become a drama teacher in Tomhood school (London) .

== Biography ==
Antony made his acting debut in 1987, playing a very minor role in the Stanley Kubrick film Full Metal Jacket, which was being filmed on location in east London.

Antony was trained at the Poor School in London's King's Cross. After several years working in the theatre, he secured the role of Alan Jackson in the BBC soap opera EastEnders. During his four years in the soap Antony's character weathered unemployment, an affair, the break-up and reconciliation of his relationship with Carol Jackson (Lindsay Coulson), and finally left in a dramatic exit following the kidnapping of his on-screen son, Billy (Devon Anderson). In reality the Jackson family were written out of the show to facilitate Lindsay Coulson's desire to leave. Antony was allegedly asked to reprise his role a year after his exit, but decided not to return.

After quitting the soap, Antony starred in the 2003 psychological thriller Seizing Me. He has also appeared twice in the BBC medical drama Doctors, in 2003 and 2004, and he played the role of Parker in the 2004 film The Defender, alongside Dolph Lundgren.

Antony reprised his role as Alan Jackson in EastEnders from 12 October to 25 October 2010, appearing in three episodes.
