= Terence Beesley =

English actor (1957–2017)

- Beesley as Derek Branning in EastEnders
- Born: 7 September 1957; London, England
- Died: 30 November 2017 (aged 60); Camerton, Somerset, England
- Education: London Academy of Music and Dramatic Art
- Occupation: Actor
- Years active: 1985–2017
- Television: EastEnders (1996)
- Spouse: Ashley Jensen (m. 2007)
- Children: 1

Terence Beesley (7 September 1957 – 30 November 2017) was an English actor.

== Early life and education ==
Born in London to Irish parents, he studied at the City Lit in London in 1980, and then trained as an actor at the London Academy of Music and Dramatic Art.

== Career ==
=== Television ===
His television work included Cadfael, The Bill, Where the Heart Is, Heartbeat, Midsomer Murders, EastEnders (as Derek Branning in 1996), Casualty, Down to Earth, Plotlands, Agatha Christie's Poirot, She's Out and What Remains. He starred in Peter Kosminsky's 15: The Life and Death of Phillip Knight, and played General Bennigsen in the BBC adaptation of War and Peace.

=== Theatre ===
His stage work included British theatre performances as the title role in Shakespeare's Richard III (1995) and as the Vicomte de Valmont in Les Liaisons Dangereuses (1994) for multi Barrymore award winner director Mark Clements and his own adaptation (with Colin Wakefield) of Nikolai Gogol's "Diary of a Madman" (as a one-man play) at the Royal Exchange Theatre, Manchester. Along with Jonathan Church and Jules Melvin, he was a founder of the Triptych Theatre Company. Their first production, Jack Shepherd's In Lambeth at the Lyric Studio, received much critical acclaim.

== Personal life ==
He met actress Ashley Jensen in 1999 when they were appearing in a production of King Lear at the Manchester Royal Exchange, and they married in Big Sur, California in 2007. Their son was born on 20 October 2009.

== Death ==
Beesley died at the family home in Camerton, Somerset, on 30 November 2017, aged 60, having been found unconscious in a car in his garage. An inquest in February 2018 ruled suicide by carbon monoxide poisoning.

== Filmography ==
Year	Title	Role	Notes
1989	The Phantom of the Opera	Joseph Buquet	
1990	Strike It Rich	Croupier	
1994	Decadence	Giovanni	
1996	EastEnders	Derek Branning	3 episodes
1999	Human Traffic	Moff's Father	
2006	The Listening	John Strobel	
2014	Sharkproof	Armen	
2016	London Has Fallen	Fire Dept. Head	
