= John Bardon =

English actor (1939–2014)

- Bardon as Jim Branning in EastEnders (2008)
- Born: John Michael Jones; 25 August 1939; Brentford, Middlesex, England
- Died: 12 September 2014 (aged 75); Romford, London, England
- Occupation: Actor
- Years active: 1970–2011
- Known for: Role of Jim Branning in EastEnders
- Spouse: Enda Gates (m. 2002)
- Children: 1 (stepson)

John Bardon (born John Michael Jones, 25 August 1939 – 12 September 2014) was an English stage and screen actor. He was awarded the Laurence Olivier Award for Best Actor in a Musical in 1988 (1987 season) for Kiss Me, Kate, sharing the award with co-star Emil Wolk. He was best known for playing the patriarch of the Branning family, Jim Branning, in the BBC soap opera EastEnders, for 15 years from 1996 to 2011.

== Early life and amateur acting ==
John Michael Jones was born in Brentford, Middlesex; his father was a shipping clerk who formerly ran a building business. "Bardon" was his grandmother's maiden name. His early acting experience was with a group called The Taverners, who played in pubs. He then appeared in productions by the Civil Service drama group, which toured theatres in Germany and Austria.

== Acting career ==
Bardon became a professional actor in 1970 at the age of 31, joining a repertory company in Exeter. He may be best known for having played Jim Branning in EastEnders. His character, the father of established character Carol Jackson, first appeared briefly in 1996. The character of Jim returned to the series in 1999 and this time became a regular character, later marrying Dot Cotton (June Brown). Bardon filmed his final scenes for EastEnders in March 2011 after years of poor health.

He also was a regular in Rumpole of the Bailey, as a member of the "clan Timson, a family of South London villains", as described by Rumpole. He had made guest appearances in Dad's Army in 1975 in the episode "Ring Dem Bells" (in addition to this, he played Private Walker in the 1975–76 stage adaptation of Dad's Army, as original television actor James Beck had died in 1973) and Are You Being Served? in 1976 in the episode "No Sale". He also guest starred in the British police drama The Sweeney, in which he played villain Doc Boyd in the episode "Faces", first broadcast on Monday 8 September 1975. In the same year, he also appeared as a bookmaker in the film One of Our Dinosaurs Is Missing. In 1977 he played Hugh Wentworth, in the Crown Court episode, ' Safe as Houses'. In 1978 he was cast as Del Rogers in G. F. Newman's Law and Order on BBC2. In 1980 he appeared in an episode of Hi-de-Hi!.

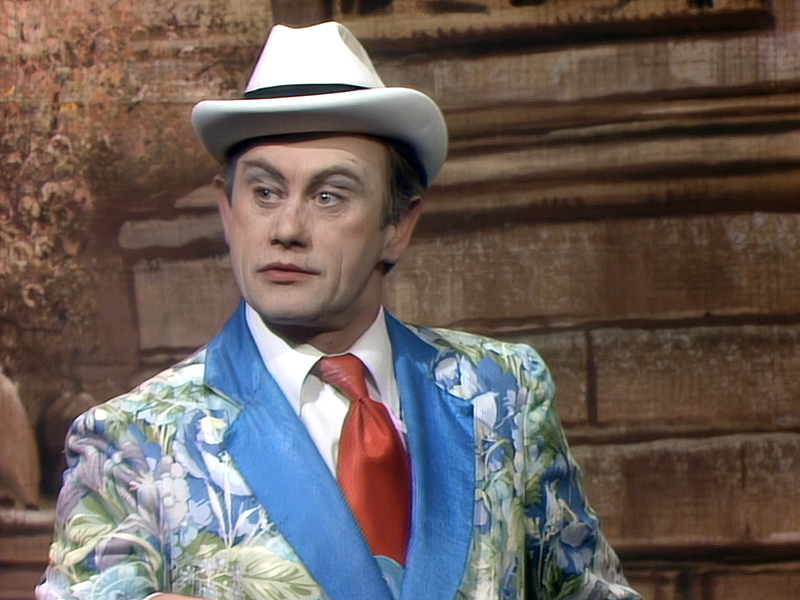
Bardon as comedian Max Miller in Here's A Funny Thing

In 1982 he appeared on Channel 4 as legendary comedian Max Miller in Here's A Funny Thing in a reprise of the role from the stage version of the production which had been seen at Liverpool Playhouse, the Edinburgh Fringe and the Fortune Theatre in London.

He also appeared in the much-acclaimed BBC drama, Johnny Jarvis (Nigel Williams).Also appeared as a The Children Film Foundation (CFF) Friend or Foe as In 1984, he had a guest role as "Constable Palk" in The Body in the Library, and appeared as a night porter in the film version of Ordeal by Innocence the following year. In 1986 he played the Head of Security for a supermarket in an episode of Only Fools and Horses from series five called "The Longest Night", in the same year he appeared as a Railway ticket collector in the film Clockwise. In 1989, he appeared in Agatha Christie's Poirot in the episode "Four and Twenty Blackbirds". The same year he also appeared in an episode of the TV series Minder, playing a gambling villain.

In October 1990 he played former boxer, Jack Morris in the series 5 episode "Hiding Place" of Casualty. From 1992 to 1993 he appeared in Get Back.

He was a guest star in two episodes of Coronation Street in the early 1990s. He appeared as the father of Daryl Stubbs in Birds of a Feather (in 1991 and again in 1998), and played an asylum warden in the 1996 TV adaptation of Gulliver's Travels. In 1997, he appeared briefly as one of the zoo customers in the film comedy Fierce Creatures, and two years later he appeared in the film East Is East as Mr. Moorhouse.

== Other appearances ==
Bardon appeared on the BBC show Just the Two of Us. His singing partner was Jocelyn Brown and the pair finished fourth. Bardon also made an appearance in the sitcom Desmond's, in a two-part episode of the second series in which he played a police officer.

He has also appeared in Birds of a Feather as the father of Daryl Stubbs.

He was the subject of This Is Your Life in 2003 when he was surprised by Michael Aspel on the EastEnders set.

== Personal life ==
Prior to his work in EastEnders, Bardon worked as a shuttle driver at Heathrow Airport. In June 2002, he married Enda Gates.

On 14 June 2007, Bardon was admitted to hospital after suffering a major stroke at home. In November 2007, it was reported that he was making steady progress, when he opened a new stroke ward at the Queen Elizabeth II Hospital in Welwyn Garden City. It was reported on 27 December 2007 that Bardon had walked for the first time in six months.

On 8 August 2008, Bardon was rushed to hospital with a second suspected stroke. It was confirmed on 5 October 2008 that Bardon had returned home. On 9 November, June Brown confirmed that he would appear in EastEnders again on Christmas Day. Jim was seen on screen briefly on 4 December 2008, when his son Jack went to see him in the care home. Bardon returned to work at EastEnders full-time in June 2009 and was on screen from 20 August 2009.

Bardon's last appearance was aired on 26 May 2011, when his character Jim left Albert Square to move into a care home. On the morning of 12 September 2014, Bardon died of a third stroke at the Romford Grange Care Home, in Collier Row, Romford. News of his death was announced later that day, and the episode of EastEnders that was broadcast that evening was dedicated to his memory.
