= Debbie Arnold =

British actress

- Born: 14 June 1955 (age 71); Sunderland, England
- Occupations: Actress; producer
- Spouses: John Challis (m. 1981; div. 1985) David Janson (m. 1989; div. 2002)
- Children: 2, including Ciara
- Website: debbiearnold.com

Debbie Arnold (born 14 June 1955) is an English actress and producer. She is known for her portrayal of regular character April Branning in BBC soap opera EastEnders between 1995 and 1996. Arnold has also portrayed regular characters in Coronation Street, Emmerdale, Hollyoaks and Doctors.

== Career ==
=== Television ===
She began her career on television, in series such as the BBC comedy The Liver Birds. When aged 18, she was given a job impersonating Marilyn Monroe on Now Who Do You Do?. She then pursued voice roles, specialising in British and American dialects.

In 1978, Arnold was a regular on the ITV gameshow 3-2-1. She has had roles in many television series including: Sykes (TV series), Shoestring, Terry and June, Minder, The Two Ronnies, C.A.T.S. Eyes, Rockliffe's Babies, The Bill, The Russ Abbot Show, The Jim Davidson Show as well as Jim Davidson's sitcom Up the Elephant and Round the Castle, Miss Marple, All Creatures Great and Small, Birds of a Feather, Jonathan Creek, M.I.T.: Murder Investigation Team, Footballers' Wives: Extra Time, Holby City and Doctors. She has also appeared in TV specials such as Oliver Twist, Minder on the Orient Express and, in 2009, she won an award for best actress after starring opposite John Altman in the feature film Photoshoot.

Arnold has also played regular characters in several major British soap operas. She played Sylvie Hicks and Carole Evans in the ITV soap opera Coronation Street, Debbie Wilson in Emmerdale, April Branning in EastEnders, Janice Bolton in Hollyoaks; she also appeared in its spin off, Hollyoaks: In the City.

=== Theatre ===
Her theatre credits include The Sleeping Prince at the Haymarket Theatre in London and the Festival Theatre in Chichester, playing opposite Omar Sharif, for which she won many awards and accolades. Other West End appearances include Hollywood Babylon, Women Behind Bars, Four in a Million, and Last of the Red Hot Lovers at the Strand. She has appeared in many fringe productions and numerous national and international tours. She occasionally appeared in the touring play Seven Deadly Sins Four Deadly Sinners and she toured in the 2010 production of Keeping Up Appearances as Rose.

=== Other ventures ===
Arnold formed her own production company, Debbie Arnold Productions which has produced various radio and TV productions.

In 2012, she released a self-help book, called The Power of Reinvention.

Arnold is an ambassador for the UK National Bullying Helpline.

Arnold is the creator and founder of The Wonderbirds Show, an online chat show.

== Personal life ==
Arnold has been married twice. In 1981, she married the actor John Challis, known for playing Boycie in the BBC sitcom Only Fools and Horses. They divorced in 1985. In 1989, she married the actor David Janson. They have two children together, one of whom is the actress Ciara Janson.

Arnold was one of three women who, following the allegations made against Harvey Weinstein in October 2017, accused the late director Michael Winner of demanding they expose their breasts to him – in Arnold's case during an audition at his home, which the actress refused to do.
