= Lindsey Coulson =

English actress (born 1960)

- Born: Lindsey Coulson; 13 April 1960 (age 66); Edmonton, Middlesex, England
- Occupation: Actress
- Years active: 1982–present
- Spouses: Phillip Chard (m. 1989; div. 1996) Harry Harris (m. 2002)
- Children: 2
- Relatives: Patsy Palmer (sister-in-law)

Lindsey Coulson (born 13 April 1960) is an English actress, known for her portrayal of Carol Jackson on the BBC soap opera, EastEnders (1993–1997; 1999; 2010–2015). For this, she won the 2000 British Soap Award for Best Dramatic Performance. Other roles include Cheryl in Manchild (2002–2003), DC Rosie McManus in Murder Investigation Team (2003–2005), DCI Sarah Tanner in Bulletproof (2018–2021), Penny Armstrong in The Bay (2019–2021), and Dame Stella Drake in Waterloo Road (2025–present). Coulson's film credits include AKA (2003) and Funny Cow (2017).

== Early life ==
Coulson was born in Edmonton, London. She was a hairdresser for six years, before studying acting at the Mountview Academy of Theatre Arts, graduating in 1982. She went on to appear in such works as an experimental production of Hamlet, in which she played a 33-weeks-pregnant Ophelia.

== Career ==
=== Television ===
==== EastEnders ====
Coulson's big television break came in 1993, when she became a household name after being cast in the part of Carol, the feisty matriarch of the Jackson family, in the successful BBC serial drama EastEnders. She remained in the role for four years, but a desire to try her hand at other roles prompted her to quit the role in 1997. She returned to the show for six months in 1999 and won the 2000 British Soap Award for Best Dramatic Performance. Despite saying in 2008 she would never return to EastEnders, it was announced on 25 October 2009 Coulson would reprise her role as Carol Jackson in EastEnders in 2010 with her on-screen family Natalie Cassidy, who played Sonia Fowler, Dean Gaffney, who played Robbie Jackson, and the character of Billie Jackson played by Devon Anderson. The Jackson family have now reunited with Patsy Palmer, who rejoined the soap in 2008 in her role of Bianca Jackson. Coulson made her onscreen comeback in February 2010 before leaving once again in October 2015.

==== Further roles ====
Her TV debut was in A Bear Behind, a 1989 children's series in which she and a puppet bear called Boz adventured around the country in their horse-drawn caravan and lived on a houseboat.

Following EastEnders, Coulson went on to star in Out of Hours alongside John McArdle, but, after the medical drama failed to get commissioned for a second series, she rejoined EastEnders for a three-month stint to help facilitate the exit of Patsy Palmer, who played her on-screen daughter Bianca Jackson. During this spell, Coulson received the best dramatic performance at The British Soap Awards.

Coulson went on to have roles in Clocking Off, Judge John Deed, Paradise Heights, Manchild, The Stretford Wives, Dalziel and Pascoe, Murder Investigation Team, The Last Detective, Urban Gothic and Where the Heart Is among others.

She later starred in the 2004 TV film She's Gone opposite Ray Winstone and the 2005 TV film The Stepfather opposite Philip Glenister.

In 2006, Coulson played Ann Peterson in the Jimmy McGovern drama The Street. Each episode focused on the stories of the people living in a particular house in the street. Coulson's on-screen husband Brian, a school teacher, was played by Neil Dudgeon.

In 2007, Coulson starred in an episode of BBC New Tricks series 4 episode 4 "Nine Lives". Her character name was Caroline Baker.

She played the role of Hester Reed in the BBC police drama The Inspector Lynley Mysteries: The Chinese Walls (2006), and she also appeared in the series four episode of Doctor Who entitled "Midnight", in June 2008.

She has since appeared in the ITV drama series The Level and The Bay. She has appeared in BBC One series Waterloo Road as Dame Stella Drake since 2025.

=== Theatre ===
On stage, Coulson has appeared in Snake at the Hampstead Theatre and has played Ophelia in Hamlet. She later starred in Three More Sleepless Nights at the National Theatre in 2009. The show ended on 27 August 2009.

=== Radio ===
Coulson starred in comedy series Lucky Heather on BBC Radio 4 in 2000.

=== Film ===
She has also appeared in a critically acclaimed film, AKA, which was shown at Robert Redford's Sundance Film Festival in 2003. Coulson appeared as Funny Cow Mum in the 2017 comedy-drama film Funny Cow, alongside Maxine Peake. The film had its world premiere on 9 October 2017 in the United Kingdom at the London Film Festival. and was released theatrically in the UK by eOne on 20 April 2018.

== Personal life ==
Coulson has been married twice. Her first husband was the showbusiness agent Philip Chard and the couple have a daughter. In 1996, the Sunday Mirror ran a story claiming that Chard had uncovered an alleged affair between Coulson and her EastEnders co-star Michael French, who played David Wicks. Coulson has denied that she and French were romantically involved. In 1998 she commented, "Because our characters had an affair, they tried to make it a real life one and that was nonsense. He was a really good friend and we started on the show at the same time. Apparently two people of the opposite sex can't go out together without it being an affair, which is a shame".

Following her split from Chard in 1996, Coulson began dating Harry Harris, the brother of Patsy Palmer, who plays her daughter Bianca in EastEnders. She later went on to marry him in 2002.

== Filmography ==
| Year | Title | Role | Notes |
|---|---|---|---|
| 2002 | AKA | Georgie | |
| 2002 | Dead Air | Lucy | Short |
| 2017 | Funny Cow | Funny Cow Mum | |
| 2018 | Walk Like a Panther | Margaret Bolton | |

== Television ==
| Year | Title | Role | Other notes |
|---|---|---|---|
| 1988-1990 | A Bear Behind | Lindsey | |
| 1992 | The Bill | Woman with Baby | Episode: "Sign of Our Times" |
| 1993–1997, 1999, 2010–2015 | EastEnders | Carol Jackson | 994 episodes |
| 1998 | Out of Hours | Dr. Cathy Harding | 6 episodes |
| 2000 | Urban Gothic | Annie | Episode: "Old Nick" |
| 2001 | Clocking Off | Bev Aindow | Series 2; 6 episodes |
| 2001 | Judge John Deed | Angela Cootes | Episode: "Duty of Care" |
| 2002 | Paradise Heights | Claire Eustace | Series 1; 6 episodes |
| 2002 | The Stretford Wives | Lynda Massey Richards | TV film |
| 2002 | Dalziel and Pascoe | Sue Blackstone | Episode: "Sins of the Fathers" |
| 2002–2003 | Manchild | Cheryl | Series 1–2; 12 episodes |
| 2003 | Danielle Cable: Eyewitness | Ann Cable | TV film |
| 2003–2005 | Murder Investigation Team | DC Rosie McManus | Series 1–2; 12 episodes |
| 2004 | Feather Boy | Annie Noble | 6 episodes |
| 2004 | Every Time You Look at Me | Kath | TV film |
| 2004 | She's Gone | Joanna Sands | TV film |
| 2005 | The Stepfather | Maggie Shields | 2 episodes |
| 2005 | The Last Detective | Cathy Moore | Episode: "Towpaths of Glory" |
| 2005 | Where the Heart Is | Rebecca Pope | Episode: "Brief Encounters" |
| 2006 | The Street | Ann Peterson | Episode: "The Flasher" |
| 2006 | The Girls Who Came to Stay | Julie Jenkins | TV film |
| 2006 | The Inspector Lynley Mysteries | Hester Reed | Episode: "Chinese Walls" |
| 2006 | Heartbeat | Deirdre Brown | Episode: "Hearts and Flowers" |
| 2007 | New Tricks | Caroline Baker | Episode: "Nine Lives" |
| 2007 | Casualty | Kate Villiers | 2 episodes |
| 2008 | Doctor Who | Val Cane | Episode: "Midnight" |
| 2010 | Material Girl | Christine | Episode: "#1.5" |
| 2016 | The Level | DCI Michelle Newman | 6 episodes |
| 2018–2021 | Bulletproof | DCI Sarah Tanner | Main |
| 2019–2021 | The Bay | Penny Armstrong | Main role |
| 2023 | The Diplomat | Amanda Watkins | Episode: "#1.5" |
| 2025–present | Waterloo Road | Dame Stella Drake | Series regular; series 15-present |

== Awards and nominations ==
| Year | Award | Category | Work | Result | Ref. |
|---|---|---|---|---|---|
| 2000 | The British Soap Awards | Best Dramatic Performance | EastEnders | Won | |
| 2003 | 9th National Television Awards | Most Popular Actress | Murder Investigation Team | Nominated | |
| 2011 | 16th National Television Awards | Serial Drama Performance | EastEnders | Nominated | |
| 2011 | The British Soap Awards | Best Actress | EastEnders | Nominated | |
| 2011 | The British Soap Awards | Best Dramatic Performance | EastEnders | Nominated | |
| 2011 | TV Choice Awards | Best Soap Actress | EastEnders | Nominated | |
| 2011 | Inside Soap Awards | Best Actress | EastEnders | Nominated | |
| 2011 | Inside Soap Awards | Best Dramatic Performance | EastEnders | Nominated | |
| 2012 | 17th National Television Awards | Serial Drama Performance | EastEnders | Nominated | |
| 2012 | The British Soap Awards | Best Actress | EastEnders | Nominated | |
| 2012 | TV Choice Awards | Best Soap Actress | EastEnders | Nominated | |
| 2014 | 19th National Television Awards | Serial Drama Performance | EastEnders | Nominated | |
| 2014 | The British Soap Awards | Best Actress | EastEnders | Shortlisted | |
| 2014 | The British Soap Awards | Best Dramatic Performance | EastEnders | Nominated | |
| 2014 | TV Choice Awards | Best Soap Actress | EastEnders | Won | |
| 2014 | Inside Soap Awards | Best Actress | EastEnders | Shortlisted | |
| 2014 | Digital Spy Reader Awards | Best Female Soap Actor | EastEnders | Fourth | |
