= Who's Been Sleeping with Kat? =

2012 storyline on UK soap opera EastEnders

In July 2012, a storyline began in the British soap opera EastEnders in which the character Kat Moon, played by Jessie Wallace, embarks on an affair behind her husband Alfie Moon's (Shane Richie) back, with an unknown person. The suspects named were Ray Dixon (Chucky Venn), Michael Moon (Steve John Shepherd), Max Branning (Jake Wood), Derek Branning (Jamie Foreman) and Jack Branning (Scott Maslen). Ray was the first suspect to be eliminated, on 7 August, followed by Michael on 14 September. The mystery man was revealed as Derek in the 20 December episode. Richie dubbed the storyline "Who's Been Sleeping with Kat?", while critics referred to it is "the who-copped-off-with-Kat saga", "Who Banged Kat?", "Who Shagged Kat?" and the "Kat Mystery Lover storyline".

The storyline received a mixed response from television critics. An Inside Soap reporter called it "soap like we've never seen it before" and the magazine's editor, Steven Murphy, said he was "totally obsessed" with the storyline, while Ellie Henman from Heat called it "possibly one of the most gripping" EastEnders storylines. Soaplife called it "boring" and "ill-conceived", and said that Kat's character had been damaged by the storyline. Kate White from Inside Soap found it "hard to have sympathy" with Kat, Sarah Dempster from The Guardian said it was a "tedious" storyline that "nobody cares" about, and Kevin O'Sullivan from the Daily Mirror called it "dreadful", "ludicrous" and "far fetched", citing similarities with a 2009 storyline in which Heather Trott (Cheryl Fergison) gets pregnant by an unknown man. Sophie Dainty from Digital Spy said the reveal was predictable and criticised the show for not explaining why Kat had the affair.

== Plot ==
When Alfie Moon (Shane Richie), landlord of The Queen Victoria pub, decides to start a pub football team, he struggles to get people to sign up. His wife Kat Moon (Jessie Wallace) takes over as manager and flirts to get people to sign up. After the first match, they host a party and Kat flirts with her chef Ray Dixon (Chucky Venn), former lover Michael Moon (Steve John Shepherd) and brothers Max (Jake Wood), Jack (Scott Maslen) and Derek Branning (Jamie Foreman), sharing a close moment with each of them. While in the kitchen alone, an unseen person enters and he and Kat have sex. She feels guilty the next day and tries to ignore his calls and text messages. She finally responds to a phone call and meets him to ask him to leave her alone. However, as he walks away she changes her mind and they continue the affair. She then fears Alfie will find out, so tries to end the affair again.

Her lover sends her a mobile phone to contact him on, but she bins it. However, when a romantic evening with Alfie goes wrong, she retrieves the phone and contacts her lover. She later receives a key to a nearby flat, and when Alfie pays more attention to the organisation of the football team, Kat heads to the flat to meet her lover, who is waiting.

The affair continues, with Alfie clueless. Kat hears that a fight has broken out between members of the football team, and fears that the truth has come out. However, it has not. The fight spills over into The Queen Victoria, and later, Kat tends to her lover's wounds. Alfie catches them but is none the wiser. The mystery man later leaves Kat a bandage with "I love you" written on in lipstick. Kat hides it in with some laundry. Alfie then asks Kat to move out following an outbreak of bed bugs in the pub. She does not want to go as she does not want to continue her affair, but she cannot resist. Alfie later finds the bandage, but assumes it is from Kat, and sends her a message in the pub's window saying "I love you 2".

Kat later ignores her lover's messages, and he tells her that he has got the message that she is no longer interested. She throws away the key, but it is found by Jean Slater (Gillian Wright), who leaves it on the bar, thinking it belongs to a punter. Kat then takes it and later meets her lover at the flat. Kat ends up staying the night, and gets her friend Kim Fox (Tameka Empson) to cover for her the next day. Kat receives flowers from her lover, and tells Alfie they are from her father, Charlie Slater (Derek Martin). Kat angrily telephones her lover, telling him she will always contact him. Alfie then grows suspicious, as Charlie would not send roses to Kat, and asks her to be honest with him. Kat then admits to having an affair.

Alfie demands to know the details, but Kat refuses to tell him who her lover is. Alfie ejects Kat from their home, where she meets Michael, to whom she discloses the affair. He urges Kat to fix her relationship, so she goes back to Alfie and says she will do anything to make it right. He gets her to phone her lover and tell him that the affair is over for good. After this, she smashes her phone and the couple go away on a "make or break" holiday.

When they return, they find that their landlord Phil Mitchell (Steve McFadden) has taken over the pub. He sacks them and forces them to move out. Kat pawns her mother's ring to pay rent to Phil, but he refuses to let them back so she tells him she is trying to fix her marriage following her affair, so he changes his mind. Kat then receives an envelope with a key and a note. She returns to the flat and writes "Kat loves Alfie" on the mirror in lipstick. When Derek, Jack and Max notice that Kat has had to pawn her mother's engagement ring, one of them buys it back for £2500 as a gift for her.

However, it seems the affair is over until Kat receives the gift of a watch, with a note saying "Miss you. Time we got together again x". Kat's lover tries to convince her to meet him at the bedsit, but when she arrives, she erases his message of love from the mirror, and bins the key. However, he then pays for Alfie to go on a trip to Germany to buy Christmas supplies, texting Kat that he now has her to himself. She then receives a candle from him, with a note saying to light it in an upstairs window so he knows when to visit. She throws it away, but Jean inadvertently lights another one. Kat extinguishes it, but it is too late as her lover arrives and knocks on the cellar door, but Kat does not open it.

After Alfie returns from Germany, Jean tells him to buy scented candles as Kat used one while he was away. He asks Kat where she got it from and she lies that it was from the local shop but he discovers they do not sell them. He then finds out Kat closed the pub early one night because it was "quiet" but worries it may have been for another reason. He then finds the ring that Kat pawned, and asks Jean if she or Charlie lent Kat money, but they did not, and the pawnbroker refuses to tell him who bought it.

The next day, he is suspicious when Kat leaves the pub and tells Michael that she is untrustworthy. Michael says Kat would not cheat again, revealing he knew about the affair, but he does not know who Kat was seeing. Alfie is in turmoil when Michael advises him not to pursue his suspicions. Roxy Mitchell (Rita Simons) finds a key on the bar and leaves it in a glass, but Alfie later notices it has gone. As he hides a Christmas present in Kat's jewellery box, he finds the key hidden there with the ring. He then leaves, claiming he will be away overnight, and asks Jean and Roxy to look after the bar so Kat can have the night off. Roxy tells the three Branning brothers that Alfie is away, and shortly after, Kat receives a phone call. She heads out, unaware that Alfie is watching.

Alfie watches Kat enter the bedsit and kicks the door open, where he sees lit candles and rose petals. He looks for Kat's lover but she is alone. He demands to know who she is seeing, reminding her that she claimed her lover lived miles away. Kat insists this was her only lie and says the affair is over but her lover kept pestering her and threatening to tell Alfie. He brings out Kat's mother's ring, and asks how her lover knew about it if she had not seen him. Kat reveals she had not seen him alone, so Alfie realises it is someone he knows. Alfie decides to stay until he arrives, but then sees a rental agreement. Kat quickly sets fire to it, but Alfie sees the name Mr Branning. She tells Alfie she refused to let the man in while he was in Germany, and refuses to reveal which of the three Branning brothers it is. Alfie says she makes him sick, and goes to The Queen Victoria to find out the truth. While Kat searches for her phone in the bedsit, all three Branning brothers deny everything to Alfie. Kat then phones one of them and Alfie answers. Kat panics and runs to the pub. Alfie then returns the phone to its owner, Max, and attacks him. Kat stops Alfie, saying he has the wrong person. Alfie asks who it is, and Kat points at Derek, who is smugly lighting a cigar.

Alfie throws Kat out of the pub, and Derek persuades her to go home with him, believing they can stay a couple but she insists she loves Alfie. Kat discovers that Derek has saved all her messages and is determined to play Alfie the last voicemail she left, in which she told Derek to leave her alone. Derek persuades her to let him do it, but he plays a different message and claims Kat has been pursuing him. Alfie punches Derek and gives him his wedding ring. Derek then tells Kat that Alfie is not interested, and hands her the ring.

On Christmas Day, Alfie tells Kat that he has moved on from her. Kat attends a Branning family dinner with Derek. She discovers Derek played Alfie the wrong message and has now deleted them all, so slaps him. Derek has a huge argument with Max and Jack, and they force him out of the house with the help of Derek's son Joey Branning (David Witts), while Kat watches on. He then suffers a heart attack on the street as everyone walks away, and dies.

Alfie subsequently divorces Kat. On the rebound, he marries Roxy, but leaves her on their wedding day, with Roxy's blessing, after realising he still loves Kat.

== Development ==
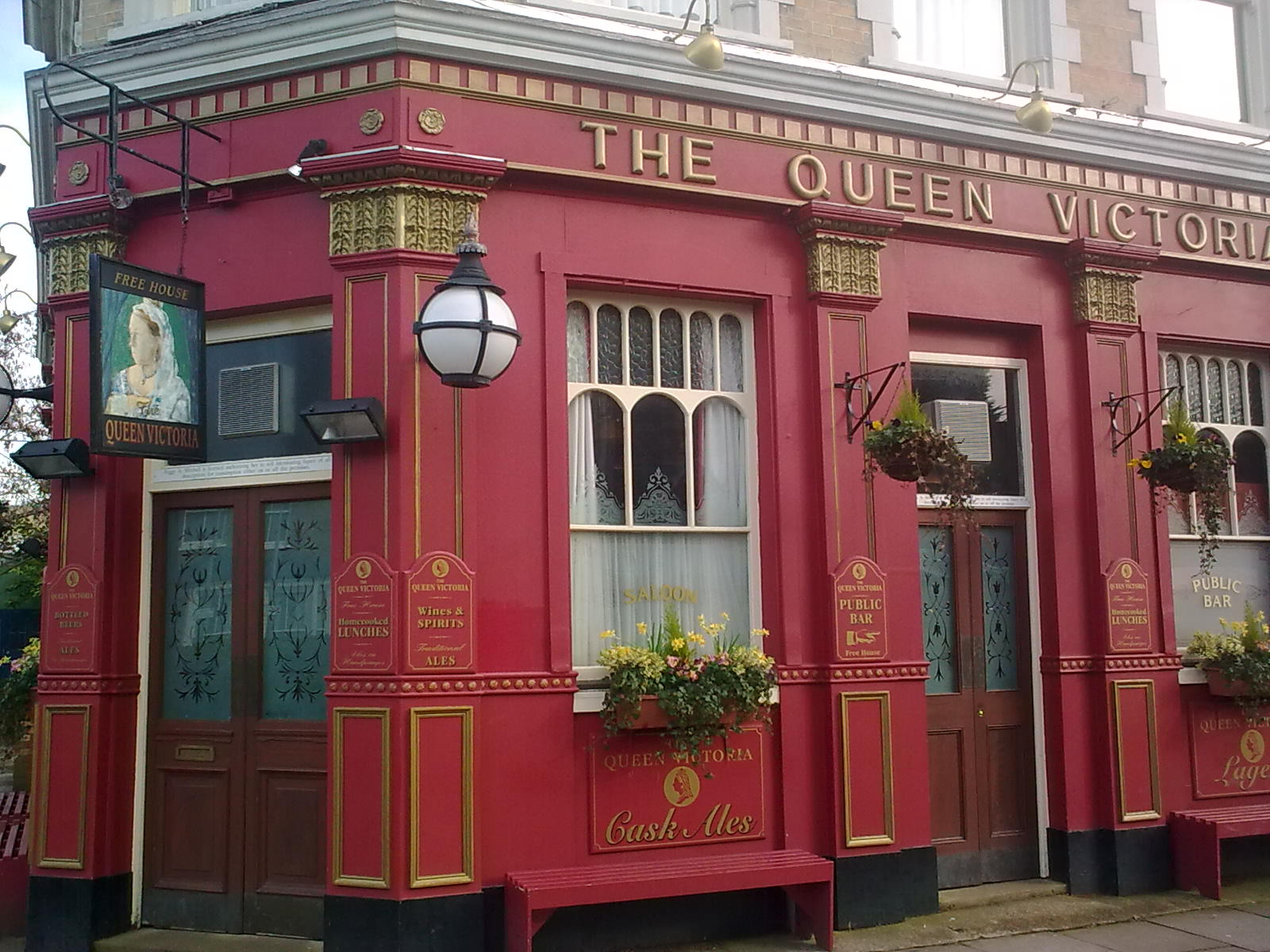
Kat's affair starts inside her pub, The Queen Victoria (pictured).

=== Initial announcement ===
On 6 June 2012, it was announced that Kat would embark on a long-running mystery affair with another Albert Square resident after becoming bored with the lack of attention at home. The identity of the mystery man was kept secret from the cast and crew, as well as viewers, and all scenes of Kat with her lover were filmed with an extra. Speaking of the storyline, Executive Producer Lorraine Newman said: "The consequences are not only great for Kat and Alfie, but also for each individual suspect. The audience will join the cast and crew guessing across the summer and autumn as we eliminate the suspects one at a time, leading to one almighty explosion." Inside Soap said the storyline would become "the biggest summer mystery in soap." After the storyline was announced, five suspects were revealed as potential love interests for Kat: Ray Dixon (Chucky Venn), Michael Moon (Steve John Shepherd), Max Branning (Jake Wood), Derek Branning (Jamie Foreman) and Jack Branning (Scott Maslen). It was reported that the storyline would be part of a "big year" and be as gripping as the "Who Shot Phil?" storyline from 2001, "with hints and red herrings all over the place to keep us guessing".

Wallace commented on the storyline, "Before my break I had the baby-swap storyline, and towards the end of last year [2011], Kat was becoming very downtrodden. Now she's back on the scene fighting fit—it's almost like when Kat first showed up in 2000. She's come back with those feisty, tarty, funny and slightly cold sides she had. It's actually a new Kat!" She later told Inside Soap that the storyline was "really exciting", calling it "cleverly written so no one knows who Kat's secret lover is—not even me or the mystery man himself. I love coming into work every day and discovering even more brilliant twists to the plot!" She added, "Everyone is going to love the excitement of the storyline. The scriptwriters have been brilliant at putting everyone in the frame. I can't wait to find out who it is!", and said that Kat loves being the centre of attention when she charms each of the suspects to join the football team, especially as her marriage to Alfie has lost its spark. She said that "Alfie has always loved Kat's sexy side, so he doesn't see any harm in [her flirting with other men]. It's just that Kat doesn't think he has the same interest in her that he used to. Alfie just seems content with domestic life, and the passion has gone." Speaking of Kat's motivation for the affair, Wallace told Inside Soap that "Kat feels deflated, as [she and Alfie] haven't had much alone time lately, but her mood is soon lifted when she hears the football lads chanting her name and goes back down to the bar. Later, she's cleaning in the kitchen when someone walks in. At first she thinks it's Alfie, but she's surprised to see it's one of the other team members. She invites him in—and one thing leads to another..."

=== Later development; first elimination ===
Talking about the episode showing Kat's lover providing them with a flat to use, an EastEnders source told Inside Soap that Kat tries to resist him, but although she knows it is wrong, she cannot help herself. They said the flat "really elavates things to a new level. This isn't just a dalliance any more—it's a full blown affair!" Later, Alfie finds a key to the flat, about which a show source said, "It's a foolish mistake, and it could well end up being Kat's undoing. With Alfie in possession of this key, the man can't get access to the flat—and if Alfie spots Kat with the same key, he'll be stunned." It was reported that the first suspect would be eliminated in the week of 4 August 2012, with an insider saying "There'll be a moment with the penny drops—and we'll all cry 'It isn't him!' It'll be a very simple moment, but utterly conclusive." They added, "at least eliminating someone at this stage will shorten the odds on the other four candidates. The intrigue is intense!". All About Soap said that viewers would be "stunned". Ray was eliminated in the episode broadcast on 7 August, when he was shown interrupting a phone call between Kat and her lover. In mid-August, Newman said that the identity of Kat's lover would be revealed "in the coming weeks".

Discussing the fight that breaks out involving Alfie and the suspects, among others, a source from the show told Inside Soap that "Kat's heart is in her mouth! Everyone she cares about is involved", adding, "Who knows where it could end—and what might be said." Kat's lover leaves a bandage with "I love you" written on it, and the source said this means the affair is turning into something more serious, "[making] it even more messy". They added "There are interesting times ahead", but said that nobody else would be eliminated at that time, and the stand-in was still used for filming. The source later said that the affair was "turning into more than just sex" and that Kat's lover "seems to be giving Kat something that Alfie can't—and that's bad news for the Moons' marriage." Speaking of Kat and Alfie's relationship and the fact that Alfie finds the bandage, they said, "Alfie hasn't got any idea at all about what Kat's up to [...] so he isn't looking out for signs that she's cheating on him. In fact, he thinks they're in a good place right now. Finding the [bandage] might not have the impact Kat's fearing. If only Alfie opened his eyes, it might dawn on him that this sudden declaration of love scrawled in lipstick is quite bizarre, to say the least."

=== Reveal to Alfie; second elimination ===
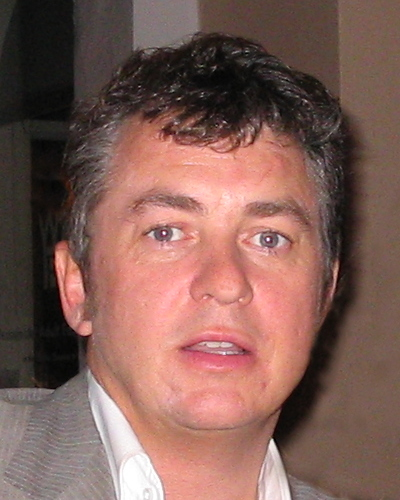
Shane Richie, who plays Alfie Moon, said his character's heart would "break in two" at finding out his wife is having an affair.

In early September, it was reported that Kat would confess the affair to Alfie, but would refuse to name the man involved. Shane Richie spoke to Inside Soap, saying that Alfie has no reason to believe Kat is cheating on him, assumes she is just partaking in harmless flirtation, and fully trusts her. He opined that Alfie believes Kat would not lie to him after having affairs in the past, but does not believe her excuses when she receives flowers from her lover. This leads to Kat confessing. Richie said that Alfie's "heart [would] break in two". Richie went on to describe the Moons' marriage as "a bit staid" because Alfie is "set in his ways" while Kat is "out looking for a bit of fun." He explained that Alfie is very committed to Kat, and is "in this marriage for the long run." He said that viewers may not want to see Kat and Alfie totally happy, describing them as "like Richard Burton and Elizabeth Taylor [...] They can't be with each other and they can't be without each other." He then promised that "what happens to Alfie next is absolutely great!" When asked what Alfie might do when he finds out who Kat is having the affair with, Richie said that he would get revenge, as "everyone forgets Alfie's been in jail. Marriage has taken off his edge, but if he finds out his wife has been with one of his closest friends, well, any bloke would want to cut the other blokes knackers [testicles] off, wouldn't he?" Richie added that the cast were "thrilled" with the storyline, saying that everyone involved is enjoying it. It was confirmed that viewers would not find out who Kat was having the affair with at this time, and that suspects would still be eliminated one at a time. Inside Soap then reported that a second suspect would be eliminated "very soon". Michael was then eliminated in the episode broadcast on 14 September, when Kat confessed her affair to him.

Richie was interviewed in Soaplife and said that he thought it was important that no characters knew about the affair before Alfie did, because "if Kat had confided in anyone that would mug Alfie off. He honestly never expected her to cheat again after everything they've been through." Asked if Alfie brought it on himself by not paying Kat enough attention, Richie said that he did not, and finding out leaves him shocked, heartbroken and angry, as he thinks they are making their marriage work. He said that Alfie is a one-woman man and if Alfie had cheated on Kat, "it would be the end of his world [...]. He does genuinely believe in marriage." Asked if Alfie could forgive Kat, Richie said that although Alfie has always done so in the past, "it's different [this time] so we'll have to wait and see." He stated that Kat's affair might be because she loves adventure and Alfie is more "set in his ways". He said that what happens next is "great", the storyline leading up to Christmas 2012 was "full on" and that the scripts were "getting the old acting juices going".

=== Further development ===
Following the reports that Alfie would discover the affair, it was reported that several different storyline endings had been filmed, but that Wallace had been told the identity of Kat's lover, with a show source saying: "The time felt right to finally tell Jessie, but she is still one of only a handful of people who knows the answer to the question on everyone's lips. [Show producer] Lorraine [Newman] was adamant this story was going to stay quiet for as long as possible. She has done everything in her power to let it play out on screen with total secrecy behind the scenes. It's created a real buzz as everyone's been trying to figure out who Kat's been bedding. Up until now, none of the cast were in the know, not even her on-screen lover. It really has been that cloak and dagger. Richie revealed that Wallace had found not knowing the identity of Kat's lover "frustrating" but that she was "torn between whether she wanted to know or not, because if she had known, she was frightened she might give it away by just a look", while Richie himself was happy not to know, "because Alfie was in the same position", adding that both actors were "happy to let it play out, though, because Kat flirts outrageously with all three Branning brothers, so we wanted the audience to make up their own minds about who the mystery lover was."

It was reported that in late November 2012, Kat's lover would "turn stalker", with Inside Soap saying that "there is no way that the mystery man is letting her get away so easily [after she tries to end the affair]. That's proved when he ups his game to get Kat to meet with him at their lovenest". An insider told the magazine that Kat's man is "persistent, ruthless and utterly fixated on her. This could be a very dangerous game for Kat to play. Might the man who loves her completely destroy her life?" It was also reported in November that Derek would be killed off from the series at Christmas, and it was speculated that he would be murdered. Alfie and Kat were both named as suspects, amongst many others, with Soaplife saying that if Derek is Kat's lover, he might turn violent if she continues to reject him and she might be forced to kill him, or Alfie might find out that Derek is Kat's lover and murder him in revenge, referring back to Richie's reminders that Alfie had been in jail and would want to harm Kat's lover. In fact, Alfie quickly became the favourite with bookmakers William Hill.

=== Reveal ===
In November 2012, a show source told Inside Soap that Christmas 2012 would "bring serious drama to the Moons" with the reveal of the mystery man's identity and the aftermath: "the consequences will be felt across the Square. Who could blame Alfie if he kicked Kat to the kerb? She has treated him appallingly." It was revealed Kat would reveal the identity of her lover during an episode in which Kat and Alfie argue, Alfie attacks one of the suspects and Kat shouts that he has the wrong brother. An EastEnders source told the Daily Star: "It's the question that has been on everyone's lips for months—who is Kat's secret lover? The big revelation was always going to be in the Queen Vic in front of everyone and it will not disappoint. Jessie [Wallace] and Shane [Richie] are both brilliant and this is one episode viewers will not want to miss. Alfie goes for one of the Branning brothers as he is convinced it's him who's been sleeping with his wife. Kat storms through the pub as he's got him on the floor and reveals the truth. We all got goosebumps as she yelled the line, 'You've got the wrong brother' [...] It really is classic [East]Enders." The source added, "Sadly it doesn't look like [Kat and Alfie will] be able to get over this one." EastEnders confirmed that viewers would discover the identity of Kat's lover in the episode broadcast on 20 December 2012. Daniel Kilkelly from Digital Spy said it would be a "dramatic climax" to the storyline. On being told who Kat's lover is, Richie said he understood and found it clever, though he had previously thought it would be Michael or Ray. Richie told Radio Times that Alfie is still in denial about the affair but becomes Kat's "stalker", following her to the bedsit. He then pieces the evidence together and realises Kat is having an affair with someone he knows.

Richie spoke to Inside Soap about Alfie's reaction, saying that when he discovers it is one of the three Branning brothers, it "really tips him over the edge, and Alfie becomes a monster. He finally gets some balls and decides enough is enough. He tells Kat that he doesn't care about her anymore—he says she's filthy and disgusting. Alfie has kept going with Kat for the sake of their love and their history. But if he can't forgive her for this latest indiscretion, there's no way they can keep their family together." He said that he and Wallace had "a vested interest" to get the scenes right, "because our bosses gave us such a great opportunity. We spent a lot of time working on it—and I hope we've ticked every box." Richie called the bedsit scene "fantastic" and told the BBC, "It's very rare you get a 15-minute scene with two people in one room". He explained that he and Wallace spent a lot of time with the episode's director, Karl Neilson, "just going over stuff, finding out where the emotions were, who was the victim, who was on the offensive, who was on the defensive", where usually there are no rehearsals. Richie also revealed that the bedsit set was a "tiny space" that was purposely built for the episodes, which Richie said was "quite claustrophobic". He called it a "square room [with] nowhere to hide", with "every blink of the eye, every look, every frown, every sigh" being seen, adding "if you're looking angry, it's there to be seen, you're naked to it". He said he "loved" that about filming the episode, and said, "you work hard to try and be as good an actor as you can and then you're given an opportunity by the BBC and by EastEnders to step up to the mark. Lorraine [Newman] believing that two actors could do that—it's a bit of a pressure on your shoulders, but me and Jessie loved it." Richie and Wallace filmed the episode about two months before it was broadcast.

Richie said that about halfway through the reveal episode, Alfie "resigns himself to the fact that it's over between Kat and Alfie, there is no going back", and said that Neilson said halfway through the 15-minute scene that Alfie would be thinking, "I understand you've done this with somebody... We can get over this... What do you mean... it's been going on for months? We can get over it, because I know you don't love him... What, you love this guy? It's someone we know? Someone in the pub...?", and said that Alfie needs to know who it is for his own peace of mind, though "his whole life just crumbles in his hands". Richie said that viewers would be surprised by the final reveal, stating that "it's really interesting about how we play the Branning card as to which one of them it is. The way it's worded, you believe it's one brother in particular and then that all changes and you go, 'oh it's him!' Because we make people believe it's another Branning—the way its worded, the way I face up to one of them. The audience will all think it's one person in particular, but then I throw a curve ball and it all kicks off. It's great." Richie said that Alfie cannot understand why Kat is having an affair with Derek, which "makes him sick". He also stated that viewers would find out in January 2013 why Kat had the affair with the person she did. He said: "It's an ongoing story, which is really interesting, to see why Kat was with Alfie and why she went for this bloke because they both offer her different things." Richie speculated that the reason Kat had an affair with Derek is "because Derek is the total polar opposite of Alfie" and Kat is "attracted to danger", which is not like Alfie, and Kat is "used to danger, she's used to excitement. What she got from Alfie was the fairytale, what she wanted was the nightmare". However, the reasons for Kat having the affair were never explained on screen.

== Suspects ==
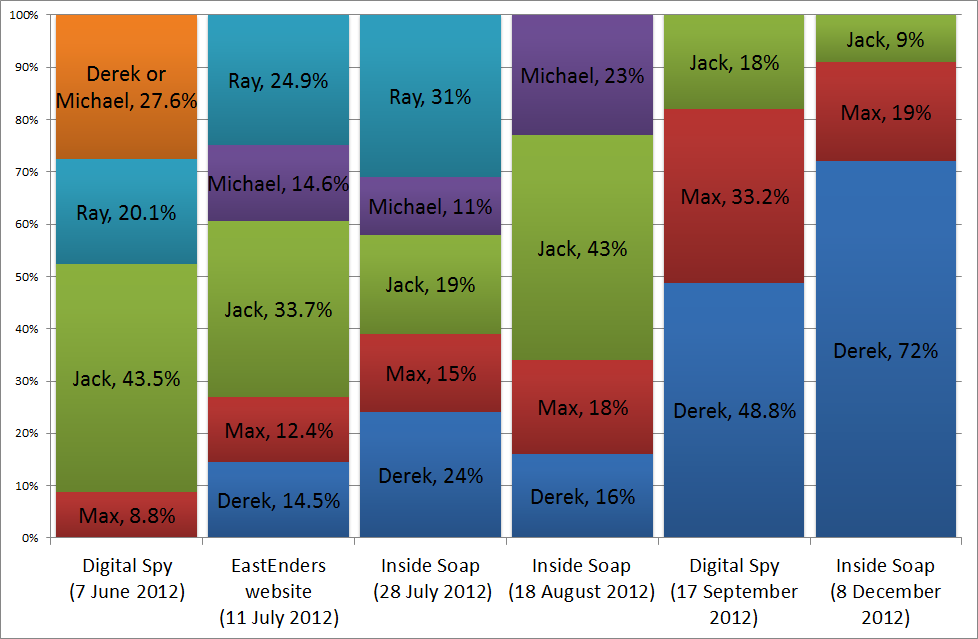
The results of various polls taken throughout 2012, showing which character viewers thought was most likely to be having an affair with Kat.

In a poll on the website Digital Spy, which took place on the day the storyline was announced, Jack was revealed to be the early favourite by readers with 43.5% of the votes, followed by Ray with 20.1%. Derek was voted third, Michael fourth and Max came last with 8.8%. A poll run on the official EastEnders website showed Jack as the favourite with 33.7%, followed by Ray (24.9%), Michael (14.6%), Derek (14.5%) and Max in last place with 12.4%. A poll by Inside Soap put Ray as the favourite with 31% of the votes, followed by Derek on 24%, Jack with 19%, Max on 15% and Michael with 11%. After Ray's elimination, Inside Soap carried out another poll, which showed Jack in the lead with 43%, followed by Michael on 23%, Max on 18% and Derek with 16%. Following Michael's elimination, a poll from Digital Spy put Derek in the lead with 48.8% of the votes, followed by Max on 33.2% and Jack with 18%. Inside Soap published further poll results in December 2012, where Derek was well ahead of the other suspects with 72% of votes. Max was second with 19% and Jack had 9%.

=== Derek Branning ===
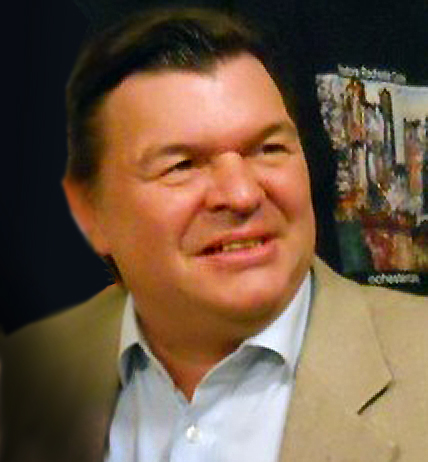
Jamie Foreman, who plays Derek Branning.

Derek is described by Inside Soap as "a man who doesn't take no for an answer", "dangerous and edgy" and "the exact opposite of poor Alfie." The magazine said that if Derek chose to have an affair with Kat, he could end up back in prison if Alfie found out and would be taken away from his daughter Alice Branning (Jasmyn Banks). They later said that Derek had previously declared that he and Kat were "two peas in a pod", which would "make her very appealing to an egotist like Derek!" They said that "sparks would fly if Derek and Kat hooked up. He's got that dangerous edge that Kat loves, but Alfie lacks! And we all know that Derek's a man who's used to getting what he wants—every time..." Soaplife said that Derek is part of every other storyline and actor Foreman's contract was extended, so the chances of it being Derek are high, but they did not want it to be Derek. However, they later said they thought it would be Derek, as love is not Kat's motivation (ruling out Jack), and Derek is the only one who would not be cheating on a partner, saying the others "would have to cheat on their other half [...] for no better reason than Kat has to cheat on Alfie (ie. none). And that would be too far-fetched." They said Derek would probably enjoy the danger of being caught out by Alfie, and continued to rule out the other suspects, maintaining that they have seen nothing to change their minds that it is Derek. All About Soap wondered if Derek would have the time and inclination to woo Kat as he is struggling to bond with his children Alice and Joey Branning (David Witts), and opined that he would, and the fact that "he's just the wrong side of dodgy, [he's] right up Kat's street. Walford's creepiest couple could be on the cards!" They made him their joint third favourite for the affair, along with Ray, and later said that an affair between Kat and Derek would be "very believable" but "more than a little bit gross", noting that Derek is on a power trip and Kat loves to be dominated and as there is more to the affair than physical attraction, there would be a "strong chance" it would be Derek. Julie Emery of Heat said of the affair, "Our money's on Derek. What a couple they'd make..."

When there were only three suspects left in the frame, Inside Soap looked at them all and gave reasons why it can and cannot be each of them. They said that Derek is yet to have a romantic storyline despite being one of the biggest characters in the show; is the only one not already in a relationship; is very emotionally needy, opining that he would "be quick to use the 'L' word where Kat [is] concerned"; and that Kat's character could take a new direction as a gangster's moll, as Derek is "the most dangerous man in Walford". However, they felt that because Derek is single, another heart would not be broken, meaning EastEnders would miss out on a "good catfight"; Kat may find him impossible to love because of all the "unbelievable things" he has done and Kat prefers men with a sense of fun; Derek would not worry what Alfie thought and may have got rid of him by now; and Derek may have too much going on with an upcoming storyline involving his son Joey and niece Lauren Branning (Jacqueline Jossa).

In February 2016, Foreman revealed that he and Wallace were "convinced" that Derek would be revealed as Kat's lover, calling it a "no-brainer", but said it was "a shame" that the discovery of the relationship was left so late "because he was in love with her". He said it was "rushed" and said Derek became "a Svengali character who wanted to lock up Kat in that flat" instead of "sitting in The Queen Vic showing her off".

=== Jack Branning ===
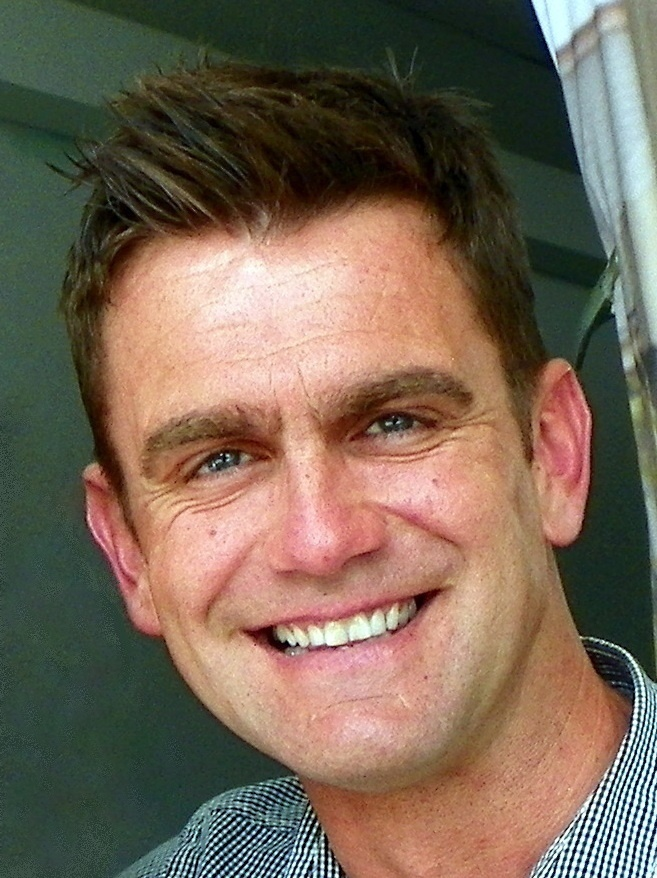
Scott Maslen, who plays Jack Branning

Jack and Kat were both involved in a baby-swap storyline, when Jack's wife Ronnie Branning (Samantha Womack) swapped her newborn baby, James Branning, who had died in his cot, with Kat's newborn baby Tommy Moon. Jack and Kat bonded when the truth was revealed. Inside Soap wondered if Jack may "relish some new excitement in his life" and went on to say that "only Kat can understand the depth of Jack's pain at losing his baby boy, and they've been drawn together several times because of it already." They felt a romance between Kat and Jack was "inevitable" and Jack is one of the few single, eligible men in the show, but "taking Kat from Alfie would ruin his good name forever." Referring to Jack, they later said "if Kat was going to throw her marriage away for anyone, we figure it would have to be the hottest man in town... wouldn't it?" Soaplife said that Jack has "got to be the number one suspect" and noted that there had been hints in 2011 that Kat and Jack would become lovers. Jack has previously cheated on Ronnie with her sister Roxy Mitchell (Rita Simons), which Soaplife said means Jack would have "no problems doing the dirty on sort-of-mate Alfie." However, Soaplife later said that Jack would not need to rent a flat, because he lives on his own. All About Soap called Jack a "womaniser without a woman", and due to their linked pasts, Jack would be the most likely suspect for Kat's affair.

With just three suspects remaining, Inside Soap looked at them all and gave reasons why it can and cannot be each of them. They said that Jack and Kat's bond is undeniable since the loss of Jack's baby James; Jack has had a lot of recent sexual encounters, so it could be easy to imagine Kat being one of them; he is sensitive so is likely to start an affair that leads to love; he hasn't had a relationship since Ronnie went to prison; and as Jack is seeing Sharon, it would lead to "EastEnders' dream catfight". However, they wondered why Jack would pursue Sharon—with whom he appears smitten—if he is in love with Kat; Alfie has shown Jack "real kindness" over the baby swap and they could not believe that Jack would betray him; and Kat is not Jack's usual type, as he prefers "a tragic blonde" such as Ronnie or Sharon.

=== Max Branning ===
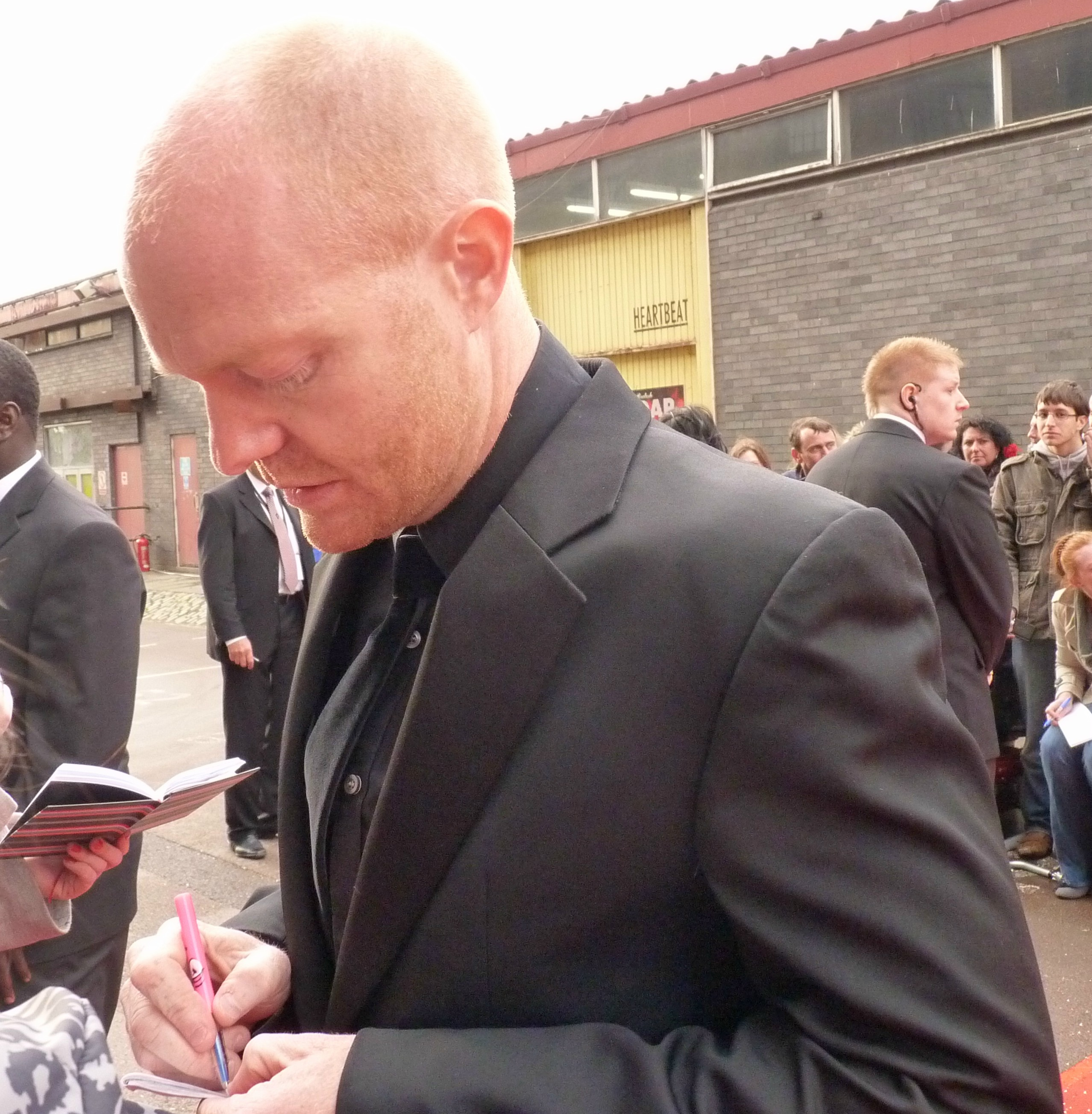
Jake Wood, who plays Max Branning.

Max has a history of cheating, which Inside Soap said would make him the most obvious person, but as he has recently reunited with his former wife Tanya Jessop (Jo Joyner), it would be the worst thing he could do. However, the magazine said that "Max thrives on passion and deceipt, so getting it on with Kat behind Tanya's back would be consistent." They also said he was busy with his own problems, but had form finding Slater (Kat's maiden name) women irresistible (he had an affair with Stacey Slater (Lacey Turner) years earlier). They said Kat's fiery personality would appeal to Max and "he loves illicit liaisons with unsuitable partners". They felt he was bound to mess up his relationship with Tanya, but thought it would more likely be something else that would do that. Soaplife said Max was "least likely even though he has the track record and the matching morals of an alley cat." Actor Wood had previously promised a big storyline for Max, but Soaplife did not think this would be it. Soaplife later ruled out Max, asking "why would he go for hamburger (Kat) when he has steak (Tanya) at home?" All About Soap called Max a "love rat", but doubted that he would cheat on Tanya again, but as it's Max, "all bets are off when it comes to the bedroom", and said he was the second most likely suspect. In September 2012, Richie said he thought that Max was the most likely suspect, saying "I think it's Max. You can't trust him!" Wood stated that "It would definitely be in keeping with Max for him to be having an affair. He's got a chequered history and women are his Achilles heel. So it would make a lot of sense for it to be him. It would be bad timing, though, because he's planning to get remarried!"

After Ray and Michael were eliminated, Inside Soap looked at the last three suspects and gave reasons why it can and cannot be each of them. They said that if it was Max, it would cause "maximum drama", bring "the biggest aftershocks, "rock Walford to its core" and cause a "fallout [that] would affect so many more people than the alternatives"; Max already has a secret, but it could be a red herring to make viewers believe he cannot be Kat's lover; he has already had a lot of affairs, often with brunettes; and "it's always Max!" However, they thought that the secret he is keeping is already "enough drama"; he spent a long time to win Tanya back so they wondered if he would fall in love with another woman at the same time; he prefers younger women such as Tanya, who was his son Bradley Branning's (Charlie Clements) babysitter when he was married to his first wife, and Stacey, who was Bradley's girlfriend; and Max has had so many affairs that "it might feel as though EastEnders is going over old ground."

=== Michael Moon ===
Kat previously cheated on Alfie with Michael and Michael is the father of Kat's child Tommy. Kat chose to stay with Alfie, but Inside Soap said there seemed to be "unfinished business" between Kat and Michael. Michael has a baby with his new wife, millionaire businesswoman Janine Butcher (Charlie Brooks), and the magazine wondered if Michael would turn to Kat if things go badly at their wedding. They also thought that Michael still has feelings for Kat, but wondered if he would actually cheat on Janine. They called him "a nasty bit of work" but thought that starting an affair when his newborn baby, Scarlett Moon, is ill in hospital would "really take the biscuit." They said the characters are drawn to each other and Kat hates Janine, but an affair would not be shocking enough as they have already had a relationship. Brooks is leaving the cast in 2012 for an extended break, so Soaplife said that something will happen to break Michael and Janine up, but thought an affair with Kat would be "too much been-there-done-that to be equal to as big a reveal as 'Who Shot Phil?'." They later said that Michael would not risk Janine's fortune by cheating. All About Soap thought Michael was the least likely suspect, as he has other things on his mind, although Kat "shows a softer side" to Michael when she gives him some baby clothes, but said that Kat hates Michael, "which could prove a problem in the romance department." They also said Michael "has a first-class degree in lying."

Inside Soap's Kate White later focused on Michael, saying that she could "easily believe the worst of Michael Moon." She said it seems "unimaginable" that he would have the time or energy for an affair, but she "still wouldn't put it past the slippery eel." She noted that Michael is the only suspect who has previously been involved with Kat, and that it was an emotional affair, rather than just a fling, so with Alfie being distant and Janine pushing Michael away, White said "we don't reckon it would take much for these two to start seeing each other again." She said that Michael has the means, unlike some of the others, as he got Janine to tear up their prenuptial agreement before they married, and the flat that Kat's lover obtained could be listed on the books of Janine's property management business, Butcher's Joints. However, White went on to say, "something tells us Kat would find it very difficult to live with herself if she was sleeping with a man whose baby is in a bad way. It seems too cruel for a mother who went through the agony of thinking she'd lost her child, so we're not sure at could cause another mum that degree of heartache. Then again, that other woman is Kat's loathed enemy, Janine." Shepherd said that Kat and Michael had "nice chemistry" and opined that Michael "would have been very keen" on a relationship with Kat, that "the opportunity for Michael and Kat to team up has always been there, from the moment he arrived" and that the writers are placed "lots of little hints to insinuate that it could be Michael". Michael was the second suspect to be eliminated, on 14 September 2012.

=== Ray Dixon ===
Ray is head chef at The Queen Victoria, is in a relationship with Kat's friend Kim Fox (Tameka Empson) and is trusted by Alfie, of which Inside Soap said an affair "seems unimaginable, but might he surprise us with his actions?" They called Ray "eye candy" for Kat, saying "it's never a bad thing" for her, and noted that she appreciates him as her head chef. For Kat to have an affair with Ray would not only mean betraying Alfie but also Kim. They felt that Ray was the most obvious choice, and had not yet had a major storyline, and an affair would shock viewers and have a big impact on Ray's family life. They also said that they would not blame Kat for an affair with Ray as he is "gorgeous, sensitive and has a six-pack to die for". Soaplife opined that Ray was the "red herring", as actor Venn has said he would like Ray to marry Kim and start a family, and later said that all hints were pointing to Ray, so "it would be no kind of mystery if it is him." All About Soap said that Ray's "flirty banter with Kat has sent her into a spin", but were not sure Ray would be the one having the affair, especially after Kat picks Alfie for the football team over Ray, and made him joint third most likely, along with Derek. The magazine later opined that "lovely" Ray would not have it in him to cheat, but thought he may have tired of Kim's behaviour. Empson told Inside Soap that she was unsure if Kat would cheat on Ray as Kim is her best friend, while Venn said that "Kat's a saucy minx, and what man wouldn't want to get involved with her? Ray is a loyal, caring father, but we all have our dark sides. There's a lot the audience hasn't seen yet, put it that way..." Venn also said, "I would love it to be me—for the drama, of course. Why not? You can just imagine the kind of drama which would ensue with Kim. It'd be fight of the century, that one. Dynasty would have nothing on this!" Ray was the first of the five suspects to be eliminated, on 7 August 2012.

=== Other suspects ===
Digital Spy wondered if there could be a further twist where one of the five named suspects is not the culprit, as the BBC said there would be "at least" five. Soaplife added Joey Branning (David Witts) as a wild card, saying, "there hasn't been a good soap toyboy storyline in we can't remember how long. And when they're done and done good, they're very, very good. It would actually be the one affair we'd understand Kat's motivation for." Jacqueline Jossa, who plays Max's daughter Lauren Branning, said that the cast were so "desperate" to know who Kat's lover was that she tricked them into believing it was Peter Andre, saying, "No one at all knows who Kat's having the affair with, we're all talking about it on set. Some people have started winding other people up saying they've been told but they won't say who it is. I started a rumour around the set that it would be a celebrity guest appearance. I said it would be Peter Andre and some of the new cast believed it as well!" However, Digital Spy reported that episodes in September 2012 would make it "pretty much certain" that Kat's lover is one of the named suspects. After the identity of Kat's lover was revealed, Richie said he would have loved it to have been Patrick Trueman (Rudolph Walker) or Tanya Jessop (Jo Joyner).

== Clues ==
During the storyline, Inside Soap magazine had a regular feature they called "Kat watch! Our eye on her guy!" in which they would be "scouring the episodes with a fine-tooth comb to spot any stolen glances, pointed lines of dialogue or suspicious circumstances that might indicate the identity of the fella Kat is having her torrid affair with." In the first few episodes of the storyline, Derek asks for Kat's help to keep Joey in Walford, which Inside Soap said would mean he would owe Kat a favour, and Derek defends Kat when she is insulted by the rival football team's manager. Inside Soap also pointed out "serious" flirting between Jack and Kat, when she teases him about being out of shape, and she names him 'Legs of the match' after the team play their first football match. They spotted that Kat has a "smouldering tete-a-tete" with Max and she knows how frustrated he is by his family problems, and he is also seen on the phone at the same time as Kat. They said that Michael donating shirts to Kat's football team and Kat giving baby clothes to Michael were clues, especially as there was an "emotional moment" between them. A "charged moment" between Kat and Ray was noted by the magazine, when she injures herself in the pub's kitchen and he helps her. All five suspects are seen with their phones at the same time Kat ends a call from her mystery lover.

The next week, in episodes broadcast from 9 to 13 July 2012, Jack and Max both witness Kat dancing sexily with Ray, and they are judgemental of her, which Inside Soap said could be because one of them is jealous, and Jack keeps "making eyes" at Kat, which could be more revealing than Kat's own actions. They later said that Kat would probably not dance with Ray like that if she was trying to keep an affair with him secret, especially in front of Kim, and said she could have been trying to make either Max or Jack jealous. All About Soap also thought Jack might be jealous, and when he asks Ray if any "hot women" are going to his party, Jack looks at Kat, which they thought could be because Jack hopes Kat will be there. The "sexy dance" between Ray and Kat was interpreted to be either evidence or a red herring, but Inside Soap noted that Kat seems keen to be around Ray. The fact she dances so close to Ray in front of Kim could mean Ray is not her secret lover, but she enjoys danger so may be willing to make a show of herself despite the risk. Kat also tells Kim she is "lucky to have found her prince", which All About Soap thought might mean Kat is jealous, and made him their favourite suspect of the fortnight.

In the week of episodes from 16 to 20 July, Kat's lover rents a flat for them to share. Inside Soap wondered if this was the biggest clue so far, saying it suggests he has access to money, because flats in London are not cheap. They said it might seem familiar, as Max has rented flats before for his lovers Stacey (when cheating on Tanya), and Tanya (when cheating on Vanessa Gold (Zöe Lucker)). They said Derek also "wouldn't think twice about flashing his cash" and opined that Jack would probably be able to afford it as well. They said viewers do not know enough about Ray yet but he would probably not be able to afford it with his job as a pub chef, and Michael, although forced to steal from Jean Slater (Gillian Wright) to pay for his wedding, is married to Janine, who is a millionaire. Kate White from Inside Soap later opined that Michael would be able to get the money for the flat as he got Janine to tear up their prenuptial agreement. In relation to the flat, Soaplife focussed on Ray following the dance between him and Kat, and thought that if it was him, then he is "either a secret millionnaire or EastEnders hasn't thought this one through." Soaplife also used this to rule Jack out, as he has his own flat and would not need to rent one.

The next week, Kim notices that Ray has a string of missed calls on his mobile phone, and suspects he is having an affair. All About Soap said that Ray is showing all the signs of having an affair, but has no scenes with Kat, which they said would be "crucial" if he was having an affair with her. They went on to say that if Ray reveals what he is up to, he could be the first suspect to be eliminated. Soaplife said that Kat never has her mobile out of her hand, so when Kim catches Ray texting a mystery woman, it could mean that he is texting Kat. Inside Soap also wondered if this was evidence of Ray being Kat's secret lover. Carena Crawford from All About Soap said that when Ray is seen with flowers heading for the tube and on the phone saying he is meeting the person he is speaking to, at the same time Kat is on her phone arranging to meet her lover, she thought it was "the biggest clue yet" that it could be Ray, especially when they later return to the pub at the same time. Inside Soap noticed in that week that episodes were "desperately trying to rule out Jack" when he has sex with three other women. They felt it could be a red herring, saying "We reckon all this seduction is supposed to make us turn a blind eye to Jack's antics—but [...] we're keeping them peeled where [Jack] is concerned!" They also wondered how he could find the time to meet these women if he was seeing Kat as well.

Of the episodes from 6 August, All About Soap said that "the finger of suspicion [...] is pointing firmly [at] Michael Moon this fortnight." Following the scene of Michael snapping at Janine and leaving her with their baby, the magazine thought he could be seeking comfort from Kat, and Janine also overhears Michael arranging to meet someone, which they thought could be Kat. Kat also tells Janine that Michael was having doubts on their wedding day, which they thought could be "Kat's sly way of telling her nemesis that Michael would rather be with another woman", and when Janine sees Michael taking cash from her safe, he could be using it to fund the flat. The same week, Janine telephones Michael, but when he answers his phone, Kat is also calling her lover, which Inside Soap says would leave viewers wondering who he had answered the phone to. After Ray was eliminated as a suspect, Inside Soap said that Michael seemed to become the front-runner, as there had been looks between him and Kat, and Kat seemed distraught, and when Kat had a conversation with Janine, Kat told Michael that she did not tell her "everything". Jack had become involved with Sharon Rickman (Letitia Dean) and Max had his own problems. However, again they felt it could be a red herring and Derek could be the one as he had been "conspicuous by his absence".

Later, in the week of episodes from 27 to 31 August, a fight breaks out involving the remaining suspects. Kat is seen tending to her lover's injuries, but viewers only saw his arm. Inside Soap said the arm could eliminate at least one suspect, as it shows some skin and a dark top. They compared it to what the suspects were wearing earlier in the episode and said it could belong to Michael or Derek, but "EastEnders might have a few tricks up their sleeves in order to put Jack and Max back in the mix." When Kat receives flowers from her lover, Inside Soap opined that Derek would be "the sort of bullish man [who would] think nothing of sending flowers to [The Queen Victoria], unconcerned that it might expose the affair." After Kat confesses to Alfie, she concentrates on her marriage, but Inside Soap noted that over a period of weeks, she had been seen "drunkenly flirting with Max, [...] making small talk with Jack [...] and giving Derek some very guilty looks", though it was still not clear who was her lover. They said that Jack had become devoted to Sharon in that time and is bothered by the bond Sharon has with Phil Mitchell (Steve McFadden), but the bold gestures made towards Kat, such has her lover buying back the ring she pawned, are Derek's style, and "he's made no secret of the fact that he fancies Kat rotten!" When Kat receives a candle with a note saying "Light it. Put it in the window. I'll come knocking", Soaplife thought this was "creepy" and seemed to be something Derek would do.

== Reception ==
=== Critical response ===
On announcement of the storyline, Soaplife said it "could be fun but could be the ruin of Kat if they get it wrong", and wondered if it would put EastEnders "back on top of its game", saying, "That depends on Kat. If we're made to love and care about her, yes. If she comes over as a conniving, sneaky cheat only interested in her own wants and desires, no." They opined that Alfie should be the one having the affair, as he cannot do anything right in Kat's eyes. They also said they "wondered which Kat we'd be getting back after Jessie Wallace's break. Would it be the tart with a heart that made Kat a soap icon? Or the alley Kat that we got last year (Kat down the alley with delivery man Mark was not her finest moment). Now with the reveal that she'll have a mystery that we can all spend weeks or months trying to guess [...], we fear it will be more alley Kat." All About Soap thought that because of the way Kat got rid of Roxy after she moved in with Alfie while Kat was away, "you'd think that [...] Kat was really committed to her husband [...] and determined to make her marriage work" but called the affair "sizzling", saying it would "send shockwaves all round Albert Square!" Soaplife said that the storyline may turn out to be a good mystery, but "when it comes to affairs, we prefer ours with a heap-big dose of love". However, they later said the storyline was "getting boring". In All About Soap, letters page editor Laura thought the affair would be "the hottest thing in the Square this summer!"

Soaplife awarded the storyline a bronze medal in their "2012 Soap Olympics" for "best storyline cycling", as Kat is "cheating again. Round and round she goes." Kate White from Inside Soap said: "Well, Kathleen Slater Moon, if you were hoping to win our sympathy by suggesting that this secret fling business is all Alfie's fault, think again! Yes, it's a bit annoying when your other half is too busy to pay you much attention—but there should at least be an effort to sort out your issues before you decide cheating is the answer! We're finding it hard to have sympathy". The magazine later called the storyline "unusual" but said that "Kat has been busy showing us how infidelity should be done". When the affair turned from lust to love, Soaplife said that it was "what the affair needed right from the start in order to save Kat's reputation."

Steven Murphy, editor of Inside Soap said that when the storyline started, he and his colleagues were "a little intrigued" but after Michael was eliminated, they were "totally obsessed!" An Inside Soap reporter said that "[the] decision to keep the man's identity a secret—and to have several characters reacting as if it could be them—means that this is soap like we've never seen it before", and added that "it makes for frustrating viewing at times, but there's no denying that this plot has us well and truly hooked. It's not so much a 'whodunnit?' as a 'who-done-her?'"

Kevin O'Sullivan from the Daily Mirror called the affair storyline "dreadful", "painfully unoriginal", "ludicrous tosh" and "far fetched", saying, "A tired old rerun of [2009]'s who-got-Heather-pregnant nailbiter, the who-copped-off-with-Kat saga was about as believable as a Barclays banker." Ally Ross from The Sun said that "someone has been slipping angel dust in the Queen Vic beer and half the Square have lost their friggin' minds [as] all the men now fancy Ting Tong (Kat Moon)", while Julie Emery from Heat said, "Now don't get us wrong, we love Kat Moon. [...] But we're finding it hard to believe that she has five (five!) blokes thinking she's sex-on-legs and lusting after her Tango'd torso. Perhaps Michael, Ray, Jack, Max and Derek all have a thing about too-tight Lycra pencil skirts and make-up that looks like it's been applied by a five year old on acid." Sarah Dempster from The Guardian dubbed the storyline "Who Banged Kat?", "a question to which the only sane response is 'Pass us the remote, love. Eddie Stobart: Trucks & Trailers is on Five.'" She said "Nobody cares" about the "tedious" storyline, adding that the reveal would cause "yawns of non-surprise" from the viewers. Following the final reveal, Ellie Henman from Heat said it had been "possibly one of the most gripping since who shot Phil" and that the reveal was "some seriously head in hands, sweaty palms, accidentally kick your dog because the moment is just too intense viewing".

In April 2013, a Soaplife reporter said, "Last year's Kat Mystery Lover storyline had to be one of the most ill-conceived and worst mysteries ever" and opined that the lack of mystery, as "the lover could [never] have been anyone other than Derek", was "painful" and they had "endure[d] over half a year of waiting for a reveal that was never anything but blatantly obvious". They also said that storyline had damaged Kat's character as it had turned her from "the tart with a heart that we had loved to an out-and-out-tart with the morals of an alley kat [sic] [and] left Kat not just without a heart and without Alfie but without much love". They went on to say that Kat needed to be "saved" but that "turning [her] from sinner to saint will be a miracle". In April 2017, Sophie Dainty from Digital Spy listed the storyline as one of nine "soap plots that went a bit too far". Dainty called the storyline "distasteful" and said that not only were viewers not surprised with the reveal but they did not care, and criticised the show for not explaining why Kat had the affair.

=== Viewer response ===
The reveal episode on 20 December 2012 was watched by an average of 8.41 million viewers at the time of its broadcast. This was a 37.2% share of the viewing audience at the time. A repeat of the episode later the same night on BBC Three received 786,000 viewers, 4.9% of the audience. It was the most-watched British soap opera episode of the day, beating its rival, Coronation Street. Official ratings from the Broadcasters' Audience Research Board showed that the episode was watched by 9.231 million people within seven days of its initial broadcast, including on BBC iPlayer. The episode caused complaints over Alfie's use of the word "shagging" while accusing Derek of the affair, before the 9 pm watershed. The word trended on social media site Twitter, and TV presenter Julia Bradbury said that it "seems to have caused a pre-watershed stir". The BBC responded by saying the word had been used in EastEnders before, but confirmed they had received 45 complaints.

=== Award nominations ===
On 22 April 2013, the reveal of Derek as Kat's lover was shortlisted for the British Soap Award for Best Episode. Heat expected the episode to win the award, saying, "The story about Kat's lover was that rare thing in soaps: a fab whodunnit not actually involving a crime, and the eventual reveal was supremely satisfying." However, the panel-voted award was won by "Emmerdale Live", a live episode of Emmerdale. The reveal was also nominated for the "Best Reveal" award at the 2013 All About Soap Awards, which was voted for by the public, however, it lost out to the EastEnders storyline in which Kirsty Branning (Kierston Wareing) is revealed to be Max's wife. Derek's manipulation of Kat in the storyline also played a part in Derek's ultimate demise and was part of Derek's wider storyline, which was shortlisted for three further awards: two British Soap Awards for Best Storyline for "the demise of Derek Branning" and Best Exit for his death, and the All About Soap Award for Best Storyline, for "Derek's reign of terror".
