= Branning family =

Fictional family from the BBC soap opera EastEnders

Branning/Jackson family
- EastEnders family
- First appearance: Episode 917; 16 November 1993
- Created by: Tony McHale
- Introduced by: Leonard Lewis
- Duration: 1993–present

The Branning family, together with the Jackson family are a fictional extended family in the BBC soap opera EastEnders. Introduced in 1993 were the Jackson family, consisting of Carol Jackson (Lindsey Coulson), her partner and later husband Alan Jackson (Howard Antony), and Carol's four children, Bianca (Patsy Palmer), Sonia (Natalie Cassidy), Robbie (Dean Gaffney), and Billie Jackson (Devon Anderson); Billie is the only child fathered by Alan. The family becomes a more dominating presence in 1999, when Carol's father Jim Branning (John Bardon) moves to Walford following the death of his wife Reenie (Joy Graham), due to cancer. Since then, all six of Jim's children have appeared, many of them with their own families.

Between 2006 and 2012, new influxes of Brannings joined the show – Max Branning (Jake Wood), his wife Tanya (Jo Joyner) and their children Lauren (Madeline Duggan/Jacqueline Jossa) and Abi (Lorna Fitzgerald). Max and Tanya later had another child Oscar Branning in 2007. Max's son with his ex-wife Rachel (Sukie Smith/Pooky Quesnel); Bradley Branning (Charlie Clements) was introduced earlier in 2006. Jim's son Jack Branning (Scott Maslen) and his daughter Penny Branning (Mia Mckenna-Bruce) were introduced in 2007 and 2008, as well as Bianca's children Liam Butcher (James Forde), Tiffany Dean (Maisie Smith), Morgan Jackson-King (Devon Higgs) and her adoptive daughter Whitney Dean (Shona McGarty) in 2008. Suzy Branning (now played by Maggie O'Neill) also returned to the show that year for a short stint. In February 2010, Carol returned to the show with her son Billie, who was killed-off months later. Once again in 2011, the Branning family were rejuvenated with the return of Derek Branning (now played by Jamie Foreman), alongside the introduction of his children Joey Branning (David Witts) and Alice Branning (Jasmyn Banks) the following year. Carol's daughter Sonia returned in 2014 with her daughter Bex Fowler (Jasmine Armfield), as did Robbie in both 2015 and 2017 and Bianca in 2019 and 2024. Lauren and her son Louie have been reintroduced, as well as Jack’s daughter Penny (now played by Kitty Castledine).

The family has been central to some of EastEnders most notable storylines since their introduction. These include Bianca attempting to seduce Carol's ex-lover David Wicks (Michael French) - unaware that he is her father, Bianca's marriage to Ricky Butcher (Sid Owen) and her abortion due to their unborn daughter having spina bifida, Billie being kidnapped, Bianca's affair with Carol's fiancée Dan Sullivan (Craig Fairbrass), Sonia's teenage pregnancy and Jim's relationship and marriage to Dot Cotton (June Brown). Since their re-development in 2006, other significant storylines include Max's affair with his son Bradley's wife Stacey Slater (Lacey Turner), Max's spurned wife Tanya burying him alive before digging him back up again out of guilt; the death of Max's son Bradley by falling from the roof of Albert Square's public house The Queen Victoria; Jack's wife Ronnie (Samantha Womack) swapping their deceased infant son James with Tommy Moon, cousins Lauren and Joey's relationship, Lauren's alcoholism, Max's relationship with Lucy Beale (Hetti Bywater) and being framed for her murder; Max's subsequent revenge which leads to him losing another child, Abi, from a fall from the roof of The Queen Victoria, and Whitney being stalked by Leo King (Tom Wells), the son of Bianca's ex-fiancé Tony King (Chris Coghill) who sexually abused Whitney. Other storylines include Max's affair with Linda Carter (Kellie Bright), Amy's self-harming, Jack's son Ricky impregnating Stacey's daughter Lily at twelve years old, and Jack's affair with Stacey.

As of 2026, the remaining Brannings consist of Jim's sons Max (Jake Wood) and Jack Branning (Scott Maslen); Max's children Lauren (Jacqueline Jossa), Oscar (Pierre Moullier), and Annie (Lois Hawkins); Lauren's sons Louie (Jake McNally) and Jimmy Beale; Jack's children Penny (Kitty Castledine), Amy (Ellie Dadd) and Ricky (Frankie Day); Ricky's daughter Charli Slater; and Penny's son Ethan Branning-Panesar. Branning family members such as Jack's civil partner Denise Fox (Diane Parish), Lauren's husband Peter Beale (Thomas Law) and Max's estranged wife Cindy Beale (Michelle Collins) remain in the soap but are considered part of other families.

== Storylines ==
=== Backstory ===
In the episode broadcast on 6 April 2010, Carol describes her great-grandfather, James William Branning, who was born on 12 December 1876. At the age of nineteen, James conceived a child and married his pregnant partner on 2 January 1897. Two months later he joined his fellow soldiers of the Royal West Surrey regiment to complete a tour of Afghanistan. Whilst on tour he died of fatal wounds, aged twenty. His early death meant he never saw his son, who went on to have two children, one of whom is Jim.

When Carol was fourteen she got pregnant by David Wicks, leading to a strained relationship with her father and her brother, Derek, bullying David and his family into leaving. Jim also had a strained relationship with his wife Reenie as he never really loved her but only married her as she was pregnant with his child. When Max was young, he made friends with a black child at school, leading to Jim and Derek burying him alive as punishment. Jim and Max had a very difficult relationship with Jim regularly beating him. However, Jim had very good relations with his two other sons, Derek and Jack, and when Jack stole his WWII medal and blamed Max, Jim and Max's relationship was broken irreparably leading to Max leaving the family home at 18.

Jim's son Max became a young father and married the mother of his child, Rachel. Rachel gave birth to Bradley but Max's affair with a woman called Tanya Cross resulted in the end of his marriage to Rachel and he walked out on both of them when Bradley was still very young and never had any contact with Bradley until 2006. In 1994, Max and Tanya had a daughter, Lauren, and they married later that year, two years later having another daughter, Abi.

=== 1993–1999 ===
Carol Jackson arrived on Albert Square in 1993 with her children Bianca, Robbie, Sonia, Billie and her boyfriend Alan Jackson. Alan was the father of her youngest child Billie, and Carol and her three other children had taken his surname, as he was a father and husband figure to them all. When April's fiancé, Nikos (Yorgos Glastras), jilted her at the altar in 1996, Carol and Alan married in their place. Carol's four children had four different fathers. David Wicks was the father of Bianca, who arrived to live in Albert Square in the same year as the Jacksons, Bianca not knowing he was her father. A man called Terry Cant was Sonia's father, who she did not know and never met, and Gary Bolton was Robbie's father, who lived with Carol, Bianca and Robbie as Carol's boyfriend but later left them after he got another woman pregnant with his second son Kevin.

Bianca started a relationship with Ricky Butcher. Bianca's immature behaviour led Ricky to begin an affair with Bianca's best friend Natalie Price. When the affair was revealed, the relationship ended and she started to see a new potential love interest in David Wicks but was devastated when he was revealed to be her father after a teenage fling with Carol in 1976. Despite her initial upset, Bianca built a paternal bond with David. This led her back into the arms of Ricky and they got engaged in 1995. The two married in 1997 and Bianca fell pregnant with Ricky's child who they intended to call Natasha. However, after a test it was discovered that the unborn baby was suffering from spina bifida and Ricky and Bianca made the heartbreaking decision to abort it. Bianca fell pregnant again and gave birth to baby Liam in The Queen Vic.

April got engaged to a Greek man called Nikos whom she met in Greece after she worked and lived there. The wedding was supposed to take place in April 1996 but Nikos jilted April at the altar. After April started a relationship with Michael Rose, Nikos returned to Walford and tried to win April back. He asked her to marry him again and they eventually left Walford and managed to marry him at the second attempt. It has since been revealed that April still lives in Greece with him.

Alan eventually grew tired of life with Carol and started an affair with singer Frankie Pierre but when it came out he and Carol separated. Carol then tried to make a go of things with her old flame David, Bianca's father. This soon ended and she and Alan reunited but they split up yet again when Alan suffered a nervous breakdown. Carol then became engaged to Dan Sullivan and became pregnant with his child but after he and Bianca started an affair, Carol had the baby aborted and called off the engagement. This led to the end of Bianca's marriage to Ricky and she left for Manchester with Liam and Ricky stayed in Walford. Carol then moved away and reunited yet again with Alan and is now living with him, their son Billie, and Alan's grandmother Blossom Jackson.

When Reenie died, Jim came to live in Walford to look after Sonia and Robbie after Carol left. Jim started a slow burning romance with Dot Cotton and he revealed to Dot he and Reenie never really loved each other and spent their entire married lives arguing. After much chasing, Dot finally agreed to marry Jim, and the two lived together in 25 Albert Square.

=== 2000–2005 ===
In 2000 Sonia had underage sex with Martin Fowler and she gave birth to baby Chloe in her living room, not knowing she was pregnant. Sonia decided to put the child up for adoption despite opposition from Martin's mother Pauline.

Robbie and Sonia tracked down Gary (Robbie's father) in Portsmouth in 2001, and he later arrived in Walford to speak to Robbie and gave him a cheque for £10,000. He used this money to take a tour of India and pay for Sonia's nursing course. When he returned he started a relationship with widow Nita Mistry. When she decided to return to India so her parents could help her bring up Anish, as she was struggling, Robbie decided to leave with her.

When Martin ran over and killed Sonia's fiancé Jamie Mitchell, Sonia surprisingly started a relationship with him and they eventually married. When Sonia discovered that Chloe's adoptive parents Neil and Sue Miller were both killed in a car crash she tracked down her daughter, now called Rebecca, and made visits to her at adoptive grandmother Margaret Wilson's house. When Sonia revealed her true identity to Margaret she threw her out, and Martin and Sonia agreed to not visit again. When Pauline discovered their secret however, she started making her own visits to Rebecca and even tried to win custody of her at one point, but Sonia convinced her that Rebecca was best off with her adoptive grandmother. Sonia left Martin when she started a lesbian relationship with Naomi Julien, much to Jim's fury. Martin and Sonia later tried to get guardianship of Rebecca in case anything happened to Margaret, but after learning of Sonia's new relationship, Margaret gave Martin sole custody. Margaret later died and Rebecca went to live with the Fowlers, but Pauline's meddling ways stopped Sonia building any sort of relationship with her daughter. Sonia's relationship with Naomi stopped and she eventually got back together with Martin behind Pauline's back. When Pauline died on Christmas Day, Sonia became a suspect in her murder but when the killer was revealed to be Joe Macer, Sonia, Martin and Rebecca left Walford together to tour the United States and live with Michelle Fowler.

=== 2006–present ===
Bradley moved to Walford from Tring in 2006 to live with Jim and Dot, after he got a job in London. Max moved his family to Walford later that year, wanting to build a relationship with Bradley again, which he did despite his rivalry with his father Jim. In December of that year, Max started an affair with his son's ex-girlfriend Stacey Slater, who later became his daughter-in-law.

In 2007, Jack Branning moved to Albert Square and began a relationship with Ronnie Mitchell. In 2008, he had a fling with his girlfriend Ronnie Mitchell's sister Roxy she became pregnant and later gave birth to a premature baby girl telling everybody that the father was her husband Sean Slater. But on Christmas Day 2008 it was all revealed as Jack's sister Suzy Branning put the DNA results into Sean's Christmas cracker after being paid by Ronnie and Roxy's father Archie, revealing to the Mitchell family that Sean wasn't the dad. Roxy then admitted that Jack was, in fact, the dad. In 2008 Bianca returns to Walford with her family and is followed soon after by Ricky.

Carol, Sonia, Robbie and Billie returned in February 2010 for Bianca's second wedding to Ricky. The show's executive producer, Diederick Santer, described the wedding as "the perfect opportunity" to bring the characters back to the show. He told entertainment website Digital Spy: "By the middle of February, the Branning-Jacksons become the biggest family on the Square. They're huge. Billie's an interesting character. He's a troubled soul, torn between being a good son to his mother and trying to have an exciting London life. And when your mother's Carol Jackson, that's quite a feat. I'm so pleased we have Lindsey Coulson back, too – she's such a fabulous actress."

On 18 February 2010, Bradley and Stacey got remarried, at the same time that Bianca and Ricky got remarried. On their wedding night, as Bradley was running from the police, he fled up a fire escape; subsequently along rooftops. When on the roof of the Queen Vic, he shouted at Stacey to run, before falling to his death. He was later posthumously blamed for murdering Archie Mitchell.

Carol and Billie later moved in with Max in order to support him through his grief, however Billie's gang crime past was catching up with him. his friend Kylie tried to shoot him in R&R, however, it was his uncle Jack that took the shot, which was in the head. This left Jack paralysed down the left side of his body.

In 2009 while Ronnie and Jack weren't together Jack was seeing Sam Mitchell at the same time Ricky Butcher was. She was arrested for her part in dens murder a few years ago and when Peggy visited her in prison she found out she was pregnant and Sam was sure Ricky was the dad until it was revealed by a DNA test that Jack was, in fact, the dad to baby Ricky Mitchell.

In October 2010 Billie Jackson died the night after his birthday due to excessive consumption of alcohol. This led Carol to self-destructive grief where she turned to Connor Stanley and began a relationship whilst he was seeing her adoptive granddaughter, Whitney. This caused Bianca to attack Connor, which led to her imprisonment.

Jack marries a pregnant Ronnie Mitchell in November 2010. In December, Ronnie gives birth to a boy whom she calls James. However, James dies of sudden infant death syndrome and in a panic Ronnie switches her dead child with that of Kat Moon. When she returns it she is arrested and sentenced to three years imprisonment. She divorces from Jack during her imprisonment, but on her release they briefly reunite before he departs in Autumn 2013 while she stays in Walford.

On 24 November 2011, Derek Branning is reintroduced, now as a regular character played by Jamie Foreman. He is an ex-convict on parole, returned to be with his family. He is portrayed as violent, causing fights with Phil Mitchell and Tanya Cross, as well as tormenting Michael Moon and Pat Evans before she dies. He sets out to ruin David's rekindled relationship with Carol when he returns for Pat's death. In 2012, Derek is reunited with his two children Alice and Joey. Joey hates Derek because of Derek's treatment towards his mother, who treat used to hit and the fact he left Joey when he was just 7 and when Alice was a baby, having no contact with them at all. Joey punches Derek refusing to have anything to do with him. However, Joey begins a relationship with his cousin Lauren in secret. When Derek and Tanya find out, he blackmails Tanya to keep quiet. Derek dies of a heart attack on Christmas Day, leaving Alice and Joey grief-stricken.

Lauren develops alcoholism as a result of Max and Tanya's turbulent relationship, which becomes more severe when her parents separate as Max's secret wife Kirsty (Kierston Wareing) reveals herself and moves to Walford. She eventually suffers kidney failure and leaves Walford with Tanya and Oscar to receive treatment and counselling for her addiction in Exeter, but returns several months later alone. Despite reconciling his relationship with Kirsty several times, Max ultimately ends the relationship and she leaves Walford.

In 2013, Carol discovers she has breast cancer, and discovers she has the BRCA2 gene, inherited from her mother Reenie, meaning the whole family could have the gene and a high chance of breast cancer in the future. She encourages her brother Max and daughters Sonia and Bianca to get tested, while undergoing chemotherapy herself. She becomes engaged to her old flame David Wicks (Michael French). On the wedding day though things don't go to plan and David ends up suffering a heart attack whilst looking for a gift for Carol. Carol is humiliated, thinking she's been jilted, but when she discovers the truth her anger doesn't subside and they have a heated argument. The next day they have a serious talk and decide to end things, with David leaving the square for good. The family briefly suffer financial difficulties without David looking out for them, but bailiffs are paid of Dot's grandson, Charlie Cotton (Declan Bennett), in return for Carol keeping quiet that Dot's son and Charlie's father Nick Cotton (John Altman) is still alive. Carol undergoes a double mastectomy in late July 2014.

In 2014 the Brannings found themselves highly involved in the murder of Lucy Beale. Before her death Lauren and Lucy had set up a business together and Max and Lucy ended up starting a secret relationship. Lucy ended it after becoming involved with Lee Carter, much to the dismay of love rival Whitney and Max who becomes violent towards Lucy. Max starts getting threatening emails from an anonymous person who knows about the relationship and confronts Lucy about it, but she knows nothing. Max aggressively confronts Lucy one night after she questions his parenting skills. Lucy later becomes increasingly guilty after finding out that the reason Whitney has been glaring at her the whole night is due to her finding out about her and Lee. She becomes very emotional whilst going to attend a party with Lauren, but Lauren is quick to dismiss this. Lucy then goes off to meet a business client, but is found dead the next day. When Max and Lucy's affair is exposed, Lauren and Abi briefly move out, but return home when their anger subsides. Abi is also revealed to be Max's anonymous emailer.

== Creation and development ==
The Branning family were introduced as an extension to the established Jackson family consisting of Carol Jackson (Lindsay Coulson), her children Bianca Jackson (Patsy Palmer), Robbie Jackson (Dean Gaffney), Sonia Fowler (Natalie Cassidy) and Billie Jackson (Devon Anderson), her husband Alan Jackson (Howard Antony) and his grandmother Blossom Jackson (Mona Hammond). Carol's father Jim Branning, played by John Bardon, had appeared in the show in 1996 as a guest character and was reintroduced in 1999 as a regular by Matthew Robinson. Three other of Jim's children, April Branning (Debbie Arnold), Derek Branning (Terence Beesley) and Sue Branning (Julie Christian-Young) also appeared in 1995 and 1996, as well as his first wife Reenie Branning (Joy Graham), who died off screen in 1999, allowing Jim to move in with his grandchildren. Jim was paired romantically with Dot Cotton (June Brown), and the couple married on screen in February 2002. The family was extended in 2005 with the arrival of Jim's grandson Bradley Branning (Charlie Clements), in January 2006. Bradley's arrival prompted a series of complaints from residents in the Hertfordshire town of Tring, where Bradley had allegedly lived before he moved to East London, as they thought their town had been portrayed as "snobbish". The BBC responded by saying that Tring was chosen following a storyline conference in the town, where the production team enjoyed their stay, saying that Bradley was not a snob but was portrayed as a character who led a sheltered life because his father left him when he was young. In 2006, scriptwriters decided to pair Bradley with the character Stacey Slater, played by Lacey Turner. Meanwhile, actor Jake Wood was introduced as Bradley's estranged father Max Branning, along with his second wife Tanya Branning (Jo Joyner) and their two daughters Lauren Branning (Madeline Duggan from 2006 to 2010, Jacqueline Jossa since 2010) and Abi Branning (Lorna Fitzgerald). Max, a serial womaniser, had left Bradley with his mother Rachel Branning, played by Sukie Smith in 2006 and Pooky Quesnel from 2007 onwards, after an affair with Tanya, and had not seen his son for several years. Max arrived with a mistress, Gemma Clewes (Natalie J. Robb), who was warned off by Bradley. Scott Maslen was announced as the latest member of the Branning clan, Jim's youngest son Jack Branning, in July 2007. Minor appearances followed from Jack's ex-wife Selina Branning and daughter Penny Branning (Mia McKenna-Bruce). Sue, renamed Suzy, was reintroduced in 2008 played by Maggie O'Neill, though she departed later that year. Bardon suffered a stroke in 2007, and a storyline was written in which Jim tended to a sick Carol, and suffered a stroke while he was there. Dot and Jim remained together, with Jim making sporadic appearances throughout 2008 and 2009 to visit Dot, and Bardon made a more permanent return to the show in late 2009, which lasted until 2011.

A major storyline for the Brannings was Max's affair with Stacey after the breakdown of her relationship with Bradley. The affair ended when Stacey issued Max an ultimatum and he quickly rushed his wife and daughters away to Spain on holiday. On their return, Bradley and Stacey had reunited and were engaged. Max and Tanya went on to have another child, Oscar Branning. The affair remained a secret, even after Bradley and Stacey's wedding day, when Lauren left her video camera running in a bedroom, filming a final kiss between Max and Stacey. On discovering the recording, Lauren burned it to DVD and the affair was discovered, causing both Bradley and Stacey, and Max and Tanya to break up. Wood took paternity leave in 2008, facilitated in the show following an episode where Tanya buried Max alive, but later dug him up after a change of heart. Both couples eventually reunited, but Tanya left Max again after discovering he had been keeping his debt problems a secret from her. Tanya moved away in December 2009, while in real life, Joyner took maternity leave. Bradley and Stacey reunited again after Bradley ended his relationship with Syd Chambers (Nina Toussaint-White), and Clements' departure from the show was announced in November 2009. Bradley made his exit from the soap on 19 February 2010, EastEnders' 25th anniversary, during a live episode, after Bradley became the prime suspect in the murder of Archie Mitchell (Larry Lamb). The episode saw Bradley and Stacey attempt to flee Walford on the night of their second wedding, but Bradley was chased onto the roof of The Queen Victoria public house and fell to his death.

== Family business ==
Unlike the Mitchells and the Beales and Fowlers, the Brannings do not have a business empire. However, they had a lot of influence in Walford's business industry. Jack Branning co-owns R&R with Ronnie Mitchell from 2007 to 2009 and is an investor of the car lot in 2009. Tanya Branning owns Booty from 2006 to 2013. Whitney Dean, Bianca's daughter, runs a T-shirt stall, following in Bianca's footsteps, as Bianca had run a clothes stall for much of the 1990s, which she does again in 2013. In 2010, Max and Bradley start their own business, Branning and Son, and rent the car lot as premises. In 2011, Jack sells his 60% share of R&R and goes into business with Max at the car lot which they renamed Branning Brothers. Jack later co-owns the boxing gym, Basher Branning's, with Michael Moon, but sells his share to Janine Butcher in 2013 to work back at the car lot. Jack leaves the square in October 2013, and Max renames the car lot Deals on Wheels. In March 2014, Lauren Branning goes into business with Lucy Beale, starting their own letting agency called LB Lettings, however Lauren closed it down following Lucy's death.

In January 2015, following the death of Max's girlfriend Emma Summerhayes, Max tricks Ben Mitchell into signing the Arches over to him, which angers Phil Mitchell. But Phil and Karin Smart trick Max into signing The Arches and Deals on Wheels over to Phil leaving Max jobless. Max regains control of the business for a year in 2018 until it's discovered Jay Brown owns the land and he's evicted.

Max later buys half of Ian's restaurant Walford East.

== Family members ==
- James William Branning
  - Unnamed son
    - Jim Branning, married to Reenie Branning and Dot Cotton
      - Derek Branning, son of Jim and Reenie
        - Joey Branning
        - Alice Branning
      - April Branning, daughter of Jim and Reenie, married to Nikos
      - Carol Jackson, daughter of Jim and Reenie, married to Alan Jackson
        - Bianca Jackson, daughter of Carol and David Wicks, married to Ricky Butcher (see also: Beale family)
          - Liam Butcher, son of Bianca and Ricky
          - Tiffany Butcher, daughter of Bianca and Ricky, married to Keegan Baker
          - Morgan Butcher, son of Bianca and Ray Dixon
        - Robbie Jackson, son of Carol and Gary Bolton, married to Nita Mistry
          - Sami Jackson, son of Robbie and Nita
        - Sonia Fowler, daughter of Carol and Terry Cant, married to Martin Fowler
          - Bex Fowler, daughter of Sonia and Martin
          - Julia Fowler, daughter of Sonia and Reiss Colwell
        - Billie Jackson, son of Carol and Alan
      - Suzy Branning, daughter of Jim and Reenie, married to Ken
        - Rebecca
        - Kevin
      - Max Branning, son of Jim and Reenie, married to Rachel Branning, Tanya Cross, Kirsty Branning, Rainie Cross and Cindy Beale
        - Bradley Branning, son of Max and Rachel, married to Stacey Slater
        - Lauren Branning, daughter of Max and Tanya, married to Peter Beale
          - Louie Beale, son of Lauren and Peter
          - Jimmy Beale, son of Lauren and Peter
        - Abi Branning, daughter of Max and Tanya
          - Abi Branning, daughter of Abi and Steven Beale
        - Oscar Branning, son of Max and Tanya
        - Annie Carter, daughter of Max and Linda Carter
      - Jack Branning, son of Jim and Reenie, married to Selina Branning, Ronnie Mitchell and Denise Fox
        - Penny Branning, daughter of Jack and Selina
          - Ethan Branning-Panesar, son of Penny and Harry Mitchell
        - Amy Mitchell, daughter of Jack and Roxy Mitchell
        - Ricky Branning, son of Jack and Sam Mitchell
          - Charli Slater, daughter of Ricky and Lily Slater
        - James Branning, son of Jack and Ronnie
    - Unnamed son (Jim's brother)
      - Gordon Branning
