= Alice Branning =

Fictional character from EastEnders

- EastEnders character
- Portrayed by: Jasmyn Banks
- Duration: 2012–2013
- First appearance: Episode 4424; 10 May 2012
- Last appearance: Episode 4768; 24 December 2013
- Introduced by: Bryan Kirkwood
In-universe information
- Occupation: Recruitment consultant Nanny
- Family: Branning
- Father: Derek Branning
- Brothers: Joey Branning
- Grandfathers: Jim Branning
- Grandmothers: Reenie Branning
- Uncles: Max Branning; Jack Branning
- Aunts: Carol Jackson; Suzy Branning; April Branning
- First cousins: Bianca Jackson; Sonia Fowler; Robbie Jackson; Billie Jackson; Bradley Branning; Lauren Branning; Abi Branning; Oscar Branning; Annie Carter; Amy Mitchell; Ricky Branning; Penny Branning; James Branning; Kevin; Rebecca
- Other relatives: Liam Butcher; Tiffany Butcher; Morgan Butcher; Bex Fowler; Julia Fowler; Sami Jackson; Louie Beale; Jimmy Beale; Abi Branning Jnr; Charli Slater; Whitney Dean (adoptive)

Alice Branning is a fictional character from the BBC soap opera EastEnders, played by Jasmyn Banks. Alice is the daughter of Derek Branning (Jamie Foreman). She made her first appearance on 10 May 2012. The character and casting was announced on 14 April 2012 with executive producer Lorraine Newman stating that Alice will allow the audience to see a softer side to Derek. Banks also stated that Alice will allow viewers to see a "lovely" side to Derek. The Daily Mirror praised the character for revealing herself as Derek's daughter on her first appearance, comparing her to Danielle Jones (Lauren Crace) after she kept her identity to her mother Ronnie Mitchell (Samantha Womack) a secret for months and then dying minutes after revealing herself. Another critic from the Daily Mirror said that Alice has had a "colossal impact" on Derek. In September 2013, it was announced that Banks would be leaving the show as part of Michael Moon's (Steve John Shepherd) exit storyline. She departed on 24 December 2013, after being wrongly arrested for Michael's murder.

== Character creation and development ==
=== Casting and introduction ===
The character and casting were announced on 14 April 2012. Of her role in the soap, Banks said, "I've been a fan of EastEnders forever and am thrilled to be cast as a Branning. It's such a privilege to be working alongside Jamie [Foreman] and I can't wait to find out what's in store for Alice." Alice has been brought up by her overprotective mother and elder brother, Joey (David Witts). Alice decides to search for her father and arrives in the show's setting of Walford to meet him and get some answers. Daniel Kilkelly of Digital Spy said, "Ever the optimist, nice girl Alice is eager and excited to meet Derek [...] but whether she'll be pleased by what she finds remains to be seen." Banks said that she was "thrilled" when she found out she secured the part of Alice. She commented: "I was working in a bar when they called to say I got the part," she commented. "I've always been a fan of the show and I'm pleased to be joining such a great family." Alice made her first on-screen appearance on 10 May 2012.

=== Characterisation ===
Alice was described as Derek's "precious daughter" and "shy". Banks said in May 2013 that she is a lot "wilder" than Alice saying "I don't see much of myself in Alice. I'm passionate as a person, not mouthy but I would stand up for myself." Banks also added that she feels like telling Alice to "stop being so wet".

Alice brings out the best in people. If she was to describe herself she'd probably choose the word 'average' – average looks, average intelligence. But Alice undersells herself. She's funny and resourceful and though she might seem like a pushover, she can stand up for herself when she needs to. Plus, there's nothing average about the family she comes from. Her father's name was dirt while she was growing up with her over-protective mother and older brother Joey. She's an optimist, and looks for the good in people.

— Description of Alice Branning from the EastEnders website (2012)

=== Notable relationships ===
==== Derek Branning ====
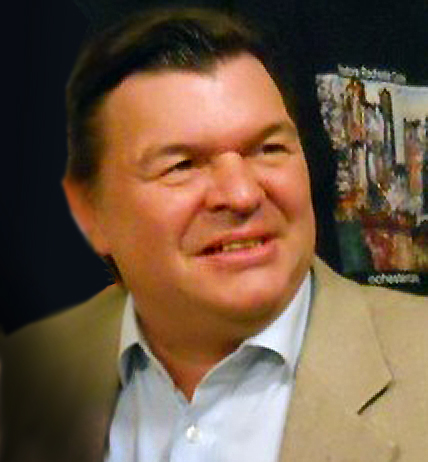
Jamie Foreman (pictured) plays Alice's father Derek Branning.

Banks said that viewers will see a "lovely" side of Derek when Alice arrives in Walford. She added that Derek wants to have a relationship with Alice, making her thing she is a nice guy while covering up his dark past. Banks said: "She makes him work to be part of her life, though. He has a lot to do to prove himself." Discussing the rest of the Branning family, Banks said: "She has no idea they even exist! They're an added bonus. It's a lot to take in – she gets to Walford and suddenly discovers there's this huge family she's a part of." Banks later added: "Jamie has made it his mission to look after me. On my very first day here, there was a big cast meeting and every single actor was there. I was both terrified and star-struck, but Jamie sat next to me and made sure that I was okay. I've already learned so much from him – he's amazing."

Asked whether there is a possibility of meeting Alice's and Joey's mother, David Witts said there is no word of it but later said it would be "quite nice" adding that there is another dynamic to be had if you are to introduce the mother. Witts continued "If it happens, I think it'd be interesting to explore that relationship. I'm sure that relationship will be something completely different to what we've seen before. The most hard-faced people can be really quite soppy with their mothers so it'd be interesting to see, but I have no idea whether it would happen or not!"

==== Joey Branning ====
It was later announced that EastEnders would be introducing Alice's brother Joey. Banks said she is excited about Joey joining the soap, adding: "There are so many places they can take them all." David Witts, who plays Alice's brother Joey, said that Joey is "very protective" towards Alice. Speaking about Joey's relationship with Alice, Witts said: "It's a lovely relationship between Joey and Alice. The dynamic is quite an unusual one, because Joey became a father figure to his sister at a very young age once he became the man of the house. When you see Alice's scenes with Joey, it's almost like she's talking to her dad because he tells her off every now and then! But there's also a lovely bond between them. Joey can be quite stern towards Alice, but it's only because he cares about her." Witts also expressed delight over the possibility of Alice and Joey's mother being introduced. Witts later added that Joey hopes to convince Alice that Derek is a "really bad guy". A writer for The People said that Alice does not know Derek, but Joey does. The writer also said that Joey is not interested when Alice tries to bring Joey and Derek together. Joey continuously tries to turn Alice against Derek but most of the attempts backfire and Joey is "keen to show Alice that the bad boy is dangerous and volatile".

==== Anthony Moon ====
Alice starts a brief relationship with Anthony Moon (Matt Lapinskas). Allison Jones of Inside Soap said that "any bloke who falls for Alice Branning is going to a real battle on his hands, thanks to overprotective dad Derek and big brother Joey. Lapinskas said that there is a simplicity about Alice that Anthony has really fallen for and takes advice from others to help woo her. He later added that Anthony wants to treat Alice properly and wine and dine her "the old fashioned way". Jones added that Anthony does not get a chance with Alice as Joey is convinced that Anthony is "all wrong for his little sister" and so cons him into playing a poker game with Derek as a way of proving he would make a good boyfriend. Anthony sees the cash as a way of treating Alice better but "gambles his life away on the turn of a card." Lapinskas' final episode aired on 30 August 2012.

==== Michael Moon and Janine Butcher ====
In May 2013, Alice begins to develop a friendship with Michael Moon (Steve John Shepherd). Banks said that people have come up to her in public stating that Alice and Michael are going to "do it". She also added that if anything did happen, then it would be fine. Alice also becomes close to Michael's estranged wife Janine Butcher (Charlie Brooks) after Janine hires her as their daughter's nanny. Daniel Kilkelly from Digital Spy called Alice Michael's "loyal ally", adding in regard to Janine and Michael's custody storyline "Alice can let him know what Janine is up to. And, of course, he has more chance of getting access to Scarlett if she is in Alice's care." Banks said in May 2013 that she wants Alice and Michael to have a romance. In episodes aired in May, viewers see that Alice develops a crush on Michael, but it has only been "one-sided" so far.

Speaking of Alice's feelings for Michael, Banks said "She's going through all sorts of emotions, but she's definitely attracted to him. Alice is naïve, though – she believes he does appreciate her and what she's done. She's blinded by her feelings for him, and too ready to make excuses for him. Alice only wants to see the good in Michael – I think she's still holding out hope that he wants to be with her too." It was also announced in May that Shepherd is to leave the soap and Banks said that she is "devastated" by this adding "I'm devastated that Steve is going to be leaving the show. I feel like I've learned so much from working with him. Steve is great to talk to and he's always got an interesting book under his arm. I'm hoping that our paths will cross again some day. Who knows how heavily Alice will feature in Michael's exit storyline?" It was revealed in August 2013 that Alice will be heavily involved in Michael's exit storyline. Michael gives Alice the job of helping him get his child back from Janine but Alice later turns on him when she sees his true colours.

=== Departure ===
It was reported on 22 September 2013 that Banks would be written out of the show in late 2013. The decision to write Alice out came when Steve John Shepherd said he was leaving the show after three years. The Daily Star Sunday said that Alice will be written out as part of Michael Moon's exit storyline.

Before Michael is murdered by Janine on Halloween Night, Alice stabs him in self-defence. Alice pleads guilty to both stabbings. To facilitate the return of Stacey Slater (Lacey Turner), the storyline sees Janine, who has been arrested following a taped confession being handed to the police, face trial alongside Alice. As Banks was unavailable to film, Alice is off-screen although she is frequently mentioned during this storyline.

== Storylines ==
Alice first appears following Derek Branning (Jamie Foreman) around Walford, unnerving him. When he furiously confronts her, accusing her of being a police officer, she says she is his daughter before hurriedly fleeing. After she leaves, Derek finds her phone and uses this to track her down, asking her to hear him out. He apologises for abandoning her and not watching her grow up and Alice admits that she should not have bothered tracking him down. However, Derek asks her to meet with him next week so he can introduce her to his family, telling her he is a good man who has done bad things. When Alice arrives in Walford to meet her family, she walks in to find the Brannings arguing and Derek absent. All of Derek's family praise him, apart from Tanya Jessop (Jo Joyner), who says nothing. After Alice speaks to Tanya, she decides to leave, despite Derek's pleas for her to stay. Alice returns to spend time with her cousin Lauren Branning (Jacqueline Jossa) and eventually visits Derek. She reveals that Tanya told her things about Derek, which angers Derek, and Alice decides to leave. Cora Cross (Ann Mitchell) then shows Alice an unsent letter that Derek wrote for her, which prompts Alice to decide to get to know Derek. He promises to live a crime-free life from now on, but Alice discovers that Derek is dealing in forged banknotes, so leaves again. She continues to return and takes a liking to Anthony Moon (Matt Lapinskas), which Derek notices. Derek forces Anthony to take Alice out, but she ends up drunk and Derek looks after her. He later tells her that he will definitely change his behaviour for her, and they can keep seeing each other as long as they keep it a secret from Alice's mother, who has discovered their meetings. Derek forces Anthony to date Alice again and chaperones. When Alice's phone rings, Lucy Beale (Hetti Bywater), who is being terrorised by Derek, answers the phone to Alice's mother and tells her where Alice is. Anthony insults Alice, unaware that she can hear him.

Alice's brother Joey Branning (David Witts) then arrives to bring her home, but Alice decides to live with Derek after an argument with her mother. Several weeks later, Alice receives flowers and assumes they are from Anthony. Anthony is then forced to take her out again, as he does not want to upset her. However, he tries to put her off by behaving and dressing badly. Later, during a game of spin the bottle, Anthony and Alice kiss, and he then decides that he really does like her and invites her on a proper date. When Alice learns that Anthony has left Walford because he gambled the emporium away to Derek, she rejects her father when he tries to explain that Anthony was not the right man for her. Alice decides to move out of Derek's house, but he convinces her to stay; she forgives him. Derek is infuriated when Alice has a make-over, but she tells him she likes her new look and will not change it. She goes to The Queen Victoria public house, but leaves when Derek mocks her. She is then mugged for the new phone that Derek gave her to keep track of her, causing her to fall onto her face. Ray Dixon (Chucky Venn) witnesses this and helps, and the next day he agrees to give her classes in self-defence. Derek blames Tanya for giving her the make-over, but Alice tells him it was his phone that caused the mugging, and forces him to apologise to Tanya. Joey fakes a punch to the face to convince Alice to move out of Derek's home. Alice decides to leave Walford, but stays after Joey and Lauren are involved in a car crash.

Alice is distraught when Derek dies from a heart attack on Christmas Day. When she loses her job, Michael Moon (Steve John Shepherd) employs her to babysit his daughter, Scarlett Moon. Joey dislikes Alice working for Michael, assuming he bought her the earrings she bought herself. Joey demands that Alice stop working for Michael, and he punches Michael, so Michael fires Alice, but he soon takes her back. Alice develops a crush on Michael but fails to seduce him. She supports him when his estranged wife Janine Butcher (Charlie Brooks) gains custody of Scarlett and manipulates Janine into hiring her as Scarlett's nanny, pleasing Michael. Alice reluctantly takes Scarlett to see Michael when he asks her to. Her split loyalties stress her and she starts shoplifting and when Janine catches her stealing from her, Alice admits to taking Scarlett to see Michael. Janine then leaves Walford with Scarlett and Michael angrily blames Alice but when she states that he is angry because he has no control, he kisses Alice. They then have sex after she reveals she is a virgin. The next day he tells Alice that the sex meant nothing to him and that he does not love her. When Janine returns to Walford, she re-hires Alice as her nanny. Still trying to get over Michael, Alice starts dating Tamwar Masood (Himesh Patel), but her feelings for him are not as strong as her feelings for Michael. Michael interferes in the relationship, angering Alice., but she does not feel a connection between them, though decides to continue the relationship.

Janine has an injunction taken out against Michael, stopping him from seeing Scarlett. Alice warns Michael he will lose Scarlett forever, and decides to move out to stay with Tamwar, but Michael manipulates her into staying, kissing her and saying he needs her. He promises they can be a family but tells Alice to keep their relationship secret and stay with Tamwar, but when Janine insults Michael, Alice reveals they had sex and Janine fires her, angering Michael. Alice fails to get her job back, and vows to Michael they will do whatever it takes to get Scarlett back. She visits Scarlett when Billy Mitchell (Perry Fenwick) is looking after her, and convinces Billy to take Scarlett out. They meet Michael, and Janine arrives. Alice slaps Michael, telling him she will not let him use her any more. Michael later thanks Alice in secret, saying he loves her, as now Janine trusts Alice again. He promises that he, Alice and Scarlett can leave Walford together and be a family. Alice ends her relationship with Tamwar, but Michael tells Alice to resume it, but Tamwar realises they are too different and they do not reconcile. Alice defends Janine to Sharon Rickman (Letitia Dean), so Janine allows her to look after Scarlett again. Michael then plans to kill Janine, so steals her credit card and orders sleeping tablets from the internet. He tells Alice they will just make Janine drowsy and then they can take Scarlett and leave for Morocco. Alice offers to put the crushed up pills in Janine's drink so that Michael does not breach the injunction, but she does not do it after she realises that Michael has used too many tablets and is planning to murder Janine. She confronts Michael, saying that he is brainwashing her, and knees him in the groin.

Alice disappears but returns to tell Michael that she considered telling the police, but could not stop thinking about him and Scarlett, and does not want Scarlett to be without her father, so agrees to help him kill Janine. Michael invites Janine out so that Alice can babysit, giving her an opportunity to put the pills in Janine's drink. Alice goes to Janine's, and Michael later finds her at home with blood on her hands. Michael goes to Janine's house, but Janine is alive Alice has told her everything and they are framing Michael for an attack on Janine. When Alice arrives, Michael attempts to manipulate her again. Alice admits that she does love Michael and says they can run away together. Janine has already called the police. However, when Michael cannot see Scarlett, he attempts to strangle Janine. Alice stops him by stabbing him, and then answers the door to the police, believing that she has just killed Michael, while Janine, stabbing him again, kills him.

Alice is arrested and tells the truth in her interview. However, Janine lies to the police that Alice attacked her and Michael, and Alice stabbed Michael twice, while Alice says it was only once. Forensics confirm that a second stab wound was fatal, so Alice is wrongfully charged and remanded by the incompetent police, devastated she breaks down in the interview room begging to be released and protesting her innocence. When Joey visits Alice, she is confused about what happened, saying she cannot remember it clearly, but suspects that Janine has lied. Janine visits Alice and says that Alice should plead guilty because her mind has created the scenario that she was defending Janine. Joey tries to convince Alice to plead not guilty, but she pleads guilty to murder. Although Janine is subsequently arrested for the murder, Alice is not released because of her plea. During the trial, Alice refuses to leave her cell and is taken to hospital after self-harming. Janine confesses the truth but she is found not guilty at her trial; Alice is also found not guilty. Alice does not return to Albert Square and goes to stay with her mother.

== Reception ==
Jane Simon of the Daily Mirror said of Alice's first episode: "Well done Alice Branning. This is how a long-lost daughter should greet an estranged parent – by blurting it out on Day One, not moping about mysteriously for months on end until Janine Butcher eventually squashes you with her car." Tony Stewart of the Daily Mirror said: "While nobody in Walford is likely to bet their kneecaps on it, the arrival of Derek's daughter Alice seems to have had a colossal impact on him." Simon from the Daily Mirror later said that "meetings between Derek and his daughter Alice are often short and painfully awkward."
