= Joey Branning =

Fictional character from EastEnders

- EastEnders character
- Portrayed by: David Witts
- Duration: 2012–2013
- First appearance: Episode 4448; 22 June 2012
- Last appearance: Episode 4771; 26 December 2013
- Introduced by: Bryan Kirkwood
In-universe information
- Occupation: Barman; Car salesman
- Family: Branning
- Father: Derek Branning
- Sisters: Alice Branning
- Grandfathers: Jim Branning
- Grandmothers: Reenie Branning
- Uncles: Max Branning; Jack Branning
- Aunts: Carol Jackson; Suzy Branning; April Branning
- First cousins: Bianca Jackson; Sonia Fowler; Robbie Jackson; Billie Jackson; Bradley Branning; Lauren Branning; Abi Branning; Oscar Branning; Annie Carter; Penny Branning; Amy Mitchell; Ricky Branning; James Branning; Kevin; Rebecca
- Other relatives: Liam Butcher; Tiffany Butcher; Morgan Butcher; Bex Fowler; Julia Fowler; Sami Jackson; Louie Beale; Jimmy Beale; Abi Branning Jnr; Charli Slater; Whitney Dean (adoptive)

Joey Branning is a fictional character from the BBC soap opera EastEnders, played by David Witts. Introduced on 22 June 2012 by producer Bryan Kirkwood, Joey is the estranged son of established character Derek Branning (Jamie Foreman) and the brother of Alice Branning (Jasmyn Banks). Joey was featured in storylines such as a problematic relationship with his father due to his absence in his life, and a sexual relationship with his first cousin Lauren Branning (Jacqueline Jossa). Joey and Lauren's relationship was one of the prominent storylines featured throughout 2012 and 2013. He also had relationships with Lucy Beale (Hetti Bywater), Whitney Dean (Shona McGarty) and Janine Butcher (Charlie Brooks).

The character is recognised as one of the sexiest males in the show's history, and Witts won "Sexiest Male" at the Inside Soap Awards as well as being nominated again at The British Soap Awards 2013. Witts also won "Most Popular Newcomer" at the National Television Awards. In October 2013, it was announced that Witts had decided to leave the show. The door was left open for a possible return for the character, and Joey left Albert Square to live with his mother on 26 December 2013.

== Creation and development ==
=== Introduction ===
The character of Joey Branning and his casting was announced on 9 May 2012. David Witts was chosen to play Joey, the son of established character Derek Branning, played by Jamie Foreman. Speaking of his casting, Witts said, "I am delighted to be joining EastEnders after being a fan for so many years. Joining the Branning family couldn't have come at a better time especially after the recent British Soap Award wins." Executive producer Lorraine Newman went on to say, "Joey is a fantastic addition to the Branning family. After an explosive entrance onto the Square, he is set to break a few hearts as he campaigns to bring Derek down."

The character's arrival meant that Derek would have to "face up to his past", and that Joey was eager to show his sister, Alice, what her father was really like. Joey was billed as "charming" but also "prides himself on telling it how it is, but is in fact a compulsive liar". The character was also easily able to attract girls, but likes to make them feel as though they made the first move – even if he has nudged them into it.

=== Characterisation ===
Joey has been described as "Charming, good-looking, and a compulsive liar." Upon being asked how he would describe his character, Witts commented, "Joey is a great character to play. He's actually a weird one to describe, because he's so different to everyone that he comes into contact with! Obviously his relationship with Derek is going to be very volatile and there's a lot of resentment there. Joey can be very dark, too – not that he would admit it! [...] There are definitely some parallels between him and Derek, which are really interesting to explore. But there's a lot more to him than that, which is why I'm really enjoying portraying him. He's also a bit of a lothario, and when it comes to his family, he's very protective towards Alice. So depending on who you are when you meet Joey, you can get a number of different responses from him."

Vicky Prior of Metro News described Joey as an "oddity" in Albert Square. She added, "His father resembled a frog auditioning for a film about the Krays. His Uncle Max is lanky, ginger and balding, yet still a devil with the ladies. But Joey defied genetics and arrived on screen to adulation worthy of a One Direction band member." Upon his exit in 2013, she said, "While Joey will be remembered for his physique, he has been an excellent character, with just the right amount of hardman swagger to offset his sweeter, romantic side."

In an interview with Digital Spy in 2013, Witts said, "I think I've been really lucky to have some big, big storylines. A lot of characters come in and stay in the background for a long time, but with Joey, I was lucky enough to come in and really get some good stuff. I'm really pleased with the scenes I've done with Jacqueline [Jossa] and I was very proud of how it played out. Before the Joey and Lauren storyline started, I think people had heard about the 'kissing cousins' and had a lot of reservations about it. But I was really pleased to see that once Joey and Lauren's relationship ended after the car crash, people had changed their minds and said, 'Well actually, they're so good together that we want them to get back together!' I was also really pleased with the aftermath of Derek's death. It was nice to show a vulnerable side to Joey, which usually isn't there."

=== Relationship with Lauren Branning ===
In September 2012, a storyline surfaced where Lauren Branning would fall for her cousin, Joey. Over the next few weeks, Lauren would realise that she had feelings for her cousin, and would be forced to confront her feelings. An insider for EastEnders told the Daily Star, "This is going to be a huge storyline across the autumn [...] the more time they spend together the more they start to realise their feelings for each other are not just that of cousins." Daniel Kilkelly later revealed that Lauren and Joey will be in a "horrifying" car crash. Filming for scenes begun on 10 September and is thought that the on-location filming will continue through the week. An insider commented "Everyone is really excited about these scenes. It's going to be a huge storyline for us in a few weeks' time, so it's definitely one for the fans to watch out for." The storyline will reportedly air in November 2012 and is said to be one of the show's biggest moments of the year.

Lauren is later dumped by Joey after Derek blackmails him. Witts said that Joey will find life "really hard" after dumping Lauren. Derek suggests to Joey that if he tells the police that he was driving the car that drunken Lauren crashed, she can avoid a prison sentence. Joey agrees to the deception to help Lauren but is later horrified when Derek threatens to tell the police the truth unless he gets his own way. Speaking to Soaplife, Witts said "Joey must either move in with Derek and be a respectful and loving son, or dump Lauren. If Joey takes either of those options, Derek won't tell the police that Lauren was driving the car. Joey's love for Lauren is massive, but not quite as massive as his hatred for Derek. He decides to become the villain and lie that he never loved her. He'll take the flack because that will make it easier for her to move on without him." Witts also added that it will be "really hard" as he keeps making out to Lauren that he is not interested. Witts also said that Joey would be making a mistake if he told Lauren about Derek's blackmail. He commented "She's very headstrong and she'd say that she doesn't care about getting into trouble with the law. It would all end in tears. Everyone would find out as Lauren's the sort of person who'd blurt everything out, and it would cause even more of a mess. Joey very much thinks he's doing the right thing." Tony Discipline said that he does not mind watching Jossa's, his real-life girlfriend's scenes and that he supports the Joey and Lauren plot commenting "I don't find it strange to watch – it is part of the job. We always support each other and Jacqueline always asks me how it looks. But it is part of our job."

Upon being asked what his reaction was to Joey and Lauren's relationship, Witts said, "I was excited about it. From an actor's point of view you don't take it personally; you look at it and think this is a situation which is difficult for people but good for me. The more controversial a storyline is, the better for an actor because it's interesting to play out and to discover what emotions you'd feel."

=== Other relationships ===
Upon Joey's arrival in Albert Square, he takes an interest in Lucy Beale. Witts commented, "When Joey joins the Square, he finds out very quickly that Derek is being a real git to Lucy. Joey then becomes quite protective over her, and that's quite attractive to him because he does like protecting people. Joey also knows that if he's going to be around Lucy, then it's going to annoy Derek! [...] On top of all that, there will be a slight attraction between Joey and Lucy, as he can see that she's a pretty girl. But certainly at the start, it seems as though she's being used by Joey to annoy Derek."

After Joey dumps Lauren, he begins a relationship with Lucy, who is unaware that he was sleeping with his cousin. As a result, Lauren is heartbroken and extremely jealous.

Whilst Joey and Lucy are dating, he betrays her by kissing Whitney Dean. When Whitney informs Lauren about the kiss, she persuades her to tell Lucy. Daniel Kilkelly of Digital Spy said, "Although Whitney is hoping to forget the mistake ever happened, Lauren convinces her that she should come clean with Lucy rather than deceiving her. Lucy struggles with the news of Joey's betrayal when Whitney confesses what happened, especially as she thought their relationship was getting serious. When Joey later pays a visit to the chip shop, Lucy confronts him and has no time for his excuses. As she tells him that he can find somewhere else to sleep tonight, is it the end of the line for them?".

In October 2012, a revenge plot against Joey is shown in which Lauren, Lucy and Whitney decide to "teach him a lesson". David Brown of Radio Times explained, "The girls are unimpressed by Joey's carefree attitude towards relationships and come up with a plan to punish him [...] After luring him to the park with a text, Lucy handcuffs Joey to a bar in the playground. And once Lauren and Whitney come into view, he realises he's been had." Because of the feelings that Lauren had for Joey, she decided to release him later.

When Alice is framed for murder by Janine Butcher, Joey realises that she is the only person who can clear Alice's name. He decides to seduce Janine, and they have a drink together. As Joey comforts Janine after Michael's funeral, they end up sleeping together. Joey realises he has feelings for Janine and has no regrets, hoping to take things further. David Brown of the Radio Times said, "You'd have thought that Joey and Janine wouldn't be in the mood for passion. After all, Joey's sister, Alice, is currently languishing in jail for killing Michael – a crime that Janine actually committed!" He went on to add, "After a particularly harrowing prison visit, Joey goes to see Janine with a bottle of wine. As they talk and drink more, Janine breaks down and Joey comforts her. Suddenly the chemistry between them turns to passion, but does Joey have some kind of plan in mind? Whatever his motives, it seems he's certainly up for more." Their relationship is short-lived, and Joey demands Janine to tell him the truth about Michael's murder. Rachel Lucas of What's on TV explained, "Determined to get the truth out of Janine, Joey corners her in the Vic, demanding she reveal what happened the night Michael died. David drags Joey outside, accusing him of behaving like his bully of a dad. Curious when Joey reveals that Michael tried to kill Janine with sleeping pills, David brings it up with Janine. When she overreacts David realises Joey was telling the truth and comes up with a plan..." The storyline concludes when Alice is found not guilty, however Janine is also found not guilty.

=== Departure ===
In January 2013, Witts hinted that he did not want to stay in EastEnders for too much longer. He revealed that he did not want to be an "EastEnders stalwart", and would like to return to theatre later in his career. Witts elaborated: "Not because there's anything wrong with it, but for me acting is a passion and it's about spreading yourself in different areas." He added pessimistically: "I don't know if I'll still be at EastEnders in a year's time but I'll be more than happy if I am."

On 20 October 2013, it was announced that Witts had decided to leave EastEnders as Joey Branning and would depart at Christmas. Joey was set to be featured prominently on-screen for the rest of the year as he gets involved in the climax of his sister Alice's dark storyline with Michael Moon. An EastEnders spokesperson told the Daily Star, "We can confirm that David is leaving EastEnders later this year and we wish him all the best for the future." Speaking of his departure, Witts commented, "They're leaving the door open for me, which I'm really pleased about." He added, "To be honest, it's not going to be a massive exit because when you have one of those it's then very hard for you to come back. So, it's a nice story that gets me there, but it's not going to be anything that people will be talking about for years to come!"

Witts told Radio Times "It's been a really quiet year [...] There have been lots of scenes of me just walking into the café and saying 'all right'. However, it has started to pick up and get busier in the last couple of months. From Halloween through to Christmas, you'll be seeing a lot more of me." Upon being asked why he had quit the soap, he said, "Eighteen months in, I just thought that now was the right time for me to go. For me, being an actor doesn't mean just playing one part. I want to go through the process again of picking up a script and working out what I want to do with it." Joey Branning departed on 26 December 2013.

In 2018, Witts expressed an interest in returning to EastEnders as Joey Branning, saying it would be "hard" to turn down the chance. When asked if he would want to return, Witts replied, "Yeah, of course. The interesting thing about EastEnders is, I would need to gain about 10lbs in weight just to do that role again, because I was so much heavier back then [...] EastEnders is an iconic show and it's hugely successful. You absolutely can never kind of pooh-pooh that idea of going back to something so successful." However, Witts also told Digital Spy, "That being said, I can't imagine they'll ask, though. I think everyone's dead in my family, aren't they? So if EastEnders ever wanted me to pop back for a bit, then I'd absolutely think about that. But I just can't imagine they will, because I don't think there's anyone there in terms of a story that would bring Joey back."

== Storylines ==
Joey arrives in Walford to persuade his sister, Alice Branning (Jasmyn Banks) to return home. However, Derek Branning (Jamie Foreman) is angered by Joey. He punches Derek and then reveals he is his son. He makes it clear he wants nothing to do with Derek, and addresses his father by his name. Later, he meets his cousin Lauren Branning (Jacqueline Jossa) and takes a liking to her friend Lucy Beale (Hetti Bywater). He tricks Derek into giving him money, which he gives to Lucy, as Derek has been stealing money from her. He tries to bring Alice home but she insists she is staying, and Joey accepts work from Michael Moon (Steve John Shepherd) as Derek does not like Michael. He then decides to show Alice what Derek is really like, so invites several friends to a family dinner, leading to Derek trying to punch Joey. However, Alice is just angry at Joey for ruining her day. He later helps Lucy when she is being pestered by someone, and they end up kissing. Joey manages to con Derek out of more money for Lucy, and she invites him to stay with her. When Derek gains ownership of the emporium, he gives it to Joey. He later kisses Whitney Dean (Shona McGarty), angering her. Lauren notices that Whitney is unhappy around Joey, and Joey admits that he kissed Whitney. Lauren tells Joey he needs to tell Lucy but he insists it was just a kiss. Lucy, Whitney and Lauren decide Joey needs to be taught a lesson so they get Lucy to call Joey to the park and then handcuff him to a gate and leave him, Lauren later returns and frees him but Joey says to her that she's jealous that he kissed Whitney and not her so Lauren slaps him and leaves. Joey later ends his relationship with Lucy, no longer having feelings for her.

Joey later moves in with his uncle Max Branning (Jake Wood). Much to Derek's dismay, he then begins a sexual relationship with his cousin Lauren, and they quickly fall in love. Derek finds them kissing and, worried that his father will tell Max, attempts to run away with Lauren by stealing Derek's car. Lauren, intoxicated, crashes the car, but Derek saves them. Despite this Joey still has no warm feelings towards his father. He also takes the blame for the crash, but calls off his relationship with his cousin as Derek threatens to tell the police that Lauren was the real driver. Lauren's mother Tanya Cross (Jo Joyner) discovers the relationship and Derek blackmails her to force Joey to break up with Lauren.

Derek dies of a heart attack, and Joey does not help him. Joey breaks down at the funeral, telling Alice it is his fault. Dot Branning (June Brown) finds Joey and Lauren kissing on her sofa, and when Joey is introduced to her as Derek's son, she is horrified and reveals the relationship to the rest of the family. However, they continue their relationship with the approval of Lauren's parents. In a fit of jealousy, Lucy spikes Lauren's drink and Joey breaks up with Lauren, leaving her distraught. Lauren later leaves Walford with her mother and brother to go to a clinic to get over her alcoholism. When Lauren returns, she finds out that Joey had sex with Whitney. Joey and Lauren decide to still be friends, though Joey is jealous when he finds out that Lauren is seeing another man.

Joey becomes increasingly concerned about his sister Alice, and the way she is involved in a bitter custody feud between Michael and his wife Janine Butcher (Charlie Brooks). After Alice is imprisoned for Michael's murder, she tells Joey that she only killed Michael to stop him killing Janine. Joey tries to get Janine to change her statement to confirm this, but Janine refuses, claiming Alice is a murderer. Later Joey tells Janine that he believes her and when Joey comforts Janine over her loss this leads to them having sex. Janine ends the relationship when she realises Joey is just trying to get her to admit she killed Michael and Alice did not. Alice pleads guilty to the murder but Janine is arrested after Joey gives the police a tape recording of Janine admitting that she killed Michael. Joey speaks to Alice's solicitor, who confirms she will not be released because of her plea. Having nothing to stay for, Joey leaves to live with his mother. He asks Lauren to come with him, admitting that he still loves her, but Lauren decides to stay. Joey is heartbroken but agrees with Lauren when she tells him that their relationship was never right. Joey leaves after telling Lauren to make sure things always go her way.

== Reception ==
Witts was very pleased with Joey's storylines, and he proved popular with fans. Witts won the award for 'Most Popular Newcomer' for his portrayal of Joey at the National Television Awards 2013. He also won 'Sexiest Male' at the Inside Soap Awards and was nominated again for 'Sexiest Male' at The British Soap Awards in 2013. Upon being asked how he felt about running for 'Most Popular Newcomer', Witts commented, "I'm absolutely thrilled! It's not something that I'd thought about before it happened, but obviously now that I've made the shortlist, I'm over the moon. To think that anyone has watched me and liked my work makes me really pleased."

Witts often felt uncomfortable about being dubbed as a soap pin-up. During an interview with Digital Spy in 2013, Witts commented, "I'm not very comfortable with it. It's something that I've never been considered as before the show so it's very, very odd and the idea of a 'sex symbol' is an uncomfortable phrase. It's one thing to say someone is nice looking but to describe them as 'sexy' or a 'sex symbol' I find something a bit seedy about it." He also admitted to being "surprised" to win 'Sexiest Male' at the Inside Soap Awards, teling Digital Spy "I think it's utterly ridiculous and I disagree with the decision entirely! [...] But it's hilarious because I've never been considered sexy in my life – probably not even by my girlfriend."

Gay Times said of the character: "[David Witts] plays Joey Branning. A quick Google on that shows the script writers are already making him take his clothes off. Bravo EastEnders script writers!" Heat called Witts one of their "TV hunks", saying, "The more evil Joey Branning gets, the more we swoon." Inside Soap called Joey "the very definition of a soap bad boy" due to his good looks and charisma, the fact he has been damaged by his past and his success with women.

Reflecting back at his time on EastEnders, Witts opened up and admitted that he struggled with all the fan attention that came with the role. "You can't go anywhere without people rushing up to you and wanting to take pictures and stuff and that's just so strange", he told Digital Spy. He went on to say, "When I look back on it, it was a really short amount of time, but it felt like I was in it for ages [...] I never anticipated doing it for very long and also I was so young. I was 21 years old and at that age I wanted to do so many different things. Maybe had I got that opportunity at a different age, my time would have been slightly different."

Nonetheless, Witts enjoyed his time on the soap. He told Digital Spy, "I look back on it now with such fondness. At the time, it all came and went in such a blur. Because first of all, I was terrified all the time. I spent a year and a half scared. I eventually learned how to navigate that world, but the soap world is unlike anything you'll ever see, really. It's very specific within the industry [...] I'm so proud of doing the work on there and having that little bit of success. But I guess at the time, it was just a crazy whirlwind. In some ways, I wish I had been a little bit older when having that experience, so that I could really fully appreciate it and soak it up, rather than just being terrified all the time!" Kyle O'Sullivan from the Daily Mirror called Joey a "Walford hunk" who had a "scandalous" relationship with Lauren.

== See also ==
- List of soap opera villains
