= David Witts =

British actor (born 1991)

- Born: 30 June 1991 (age 35); Southend-on-Sea, Essex, United Kingdom
- Occupations: Actor, model
- Years active: 2011–present
- Television: EastEnders (2012–13); Recovery Road (2016)
- Height: 1.8 m (5 ft 11 in)
- Awards: Sexiest Male, Inside Soap Awards 2012 & Most Popular Newcomer, NTA 2013

David Peter S. Witts (born 30 June 1991) is a British actor and model from Southend-on-Sea, England, best known for his portrayal of Joey Branning in the BBC television soap opera EastEnders, in which he appeared from 2012 to 2013.

David also runs the acclaimed Work MCR acting studio, based in Manchester. He regularly hosts intensive "Stop Acting" weekend workshops, as well as ongoing weekly classes, where his coaching focuses on naturalism, instinct, truthful performances and shedding unnatural habits often taught in traditional drama schools.

== Early life ==
Witts attended Southend High School for Boys, where he first discovered his passion for acting. For a number of years, he trained with the National Youth Music Theatre and the National Youth Theatre of Great Britain. Following a short period of working as a barman, Witts appeared in numerous theatre productions, including Wild Boyz, The Wizard of Oz and Snow White during 2011 and 2012.

== Career ==
=== 2012–13: EastEnders ===
In May 2012, Digital Spy reported that Witts had been cast to play Derek Branning's son, Joey Branning, in EastEnders. Of his arrival to the series, Witts commented, "I am delighted to be joining EastEnders after being a fan for so many years. Joining the Branning family couldn't have come at a better time, especially after the recent British Soap Awards wins." EastEnders' executive producer Lorraine Newman said, "Joey is a fantastic addition to the Brannings and after an explosive entrance onto the Square, he is set to break a few hearts as he campaigns to bring Derek down."

In October 2013 it was reported that he had decided to leave EastEnders. His final scenes were aired on 26 December 2013.

=== 2014–present: Theatre, Recovery Road and Manhunt ===
In early 2014 Witts starred as Link Larkin in a production of Hairspray at the Curve in Leicester.

He appeared in the pantomime Aladdin at the New Theatre, Hull over the Christmas/New Year period of 2014/15.

In March 2015, it was announced that Witts would star in the new American TV series Recovery Road, as Craig, with the series beginning on 25 January 2016 on Freeform. In May 2016, it was announced that the show had been cancelled.

In May 2018, it was announced that Witts would be making his West End debut in the hit musical Wicked, replacing Bradley Jaden as Fiyero from 23 July 2018. Witts left Wicked on 20 July 2019 and was replaced by Alistair Brammer.

In March 2019, Witts appeared in an episode of the BBC daytime soap Doctors.

He appeared in the pantomime Cinderella at the Theatre Royal, Norwich over the Christmas/New Year period of 2019/20.

In 2021, Witts appeared in the second series of Manhunt alongside Martin Clunes. He played DC Adam Spier for four episodes.

== Filmography ==
Television
Year	Title	Role	Notes
2012–13	EastEnders	Joey Branning	Series regular
2016	Recovery Road	Craig	Series regular
2019	Doctors	Kyle Rhys	1 episode
2019	I Ship It	Luke	Series regular
2019	Pride and Prejudice, Cut	Liam	UP TV
2020	Picture Perfect Royal Christmas	Prince Leopold	Free Dolphin Productions
2021	Manhunt	DC Adam Spier	Series regular (series 2)
2022	Accidentally in Love	James	Nicely Entertainment
2025	Unforgotten	Sam	3 episodes

Film
Year	Title	Role	Notes
2024	The Beekeeper	Mickey Garnett	
2025	A Working Man	Johnny the Bartender	

== Awards and nominations ==
Year	Award	Category	Result	Ref.
2012	Inside Soap Awards	Sexiest Male	Won	
2013	18th National Television Awards	Newcomer	Won	
2013	All About Soap Awards	Forbidden Lovers (shared with Jacqueline Jossa)	Nominated	
2013	The British Soap Awards	Sexiest Male	Shortlisted	
2013	TV Choice Awards	Best Soap Newcomer	Won	
2013	Inside Soap Awards	Sexiest Male	Shortlisted	
