= Jasmyn Banks =

English actress (born 1990)

Jasmyn Grace Banks (born 20 August 1990) is an English actress. She may be best known for her 19 month run (2012–13) portraying the character Alice Branning in the BBC soap opera EastEnders.

== Career ==
Banks trained at the Young Persons Theatre Company (RAaW London) and the Italia Conti Academy of Theatre Arts. She appeared in various stage productions between 2005 and 2009, including The Wizard of Oz, Twelfth Night, 1963 They had a Dream and The Wind in the Willows. Banks first appeared on television in 2006. in an episode of the children's series My Parents Are Aliens. In 2011, Banks made guest appearances in two BBC productions for television: She played the role of Belinda Stuart in an episode of the daytime soap opera Doctors, and she played the role of Lauren in an episode of the sitcom Life of Riley entitled "Absent Friends".

In April 2012, Banks was cast as Alice Branning, daughter of established character Derek Branning, in the BBC soap opera EastEnders; she was working in a bar when she received news of her casting. Banks said she was a long-time fan of EastEnders and that she was "thrilled" to be joining the soap opera as part of the Branning family. Banks made her first appearance as Alice in an episode broadcast on 10 May 2012. Alice's character departed from the show on 24 December 2013, after being falsely charged for the murder of her lover, Michael Moon. Banks then toured with the theatre production One Man, Two Guvnors from 2014 until 2015.

== Filmography ==
=== Television ===
Year	Title	Role	Notes
2006	My Parents Are Aliens	Sarah	1 episode
2010	Little Crackers	Susan	1 episode
2011	Doctors	Belinda Stuart	1 episode
2011	Life of Riley	Lauren	1 episode
2012	Sadie J	Samantha	1 episode
2012–13	EastEnders	Alice Branning	Series regular
2015	Citizen Khan	Philippa Jenkins	1 episode
2016	Call the Midwife	Judith Coleman	1 episode
2016	Doctors	Elise Mulling	1 episode
2018	A Very English Scandal	Bridget	1 episode
2020	Quiz	Nicola Howson	3 episodes

=== Stage ===
Year	Title	Role	Ref(s)
2005	The Wind in the Willows	Ensemble	
2009	Twelfth Night	Viola	
2009	The Wizard of Oz	Wicked Witch of the West	

== Awards and nominations ==
Year	Award	Category	Result	Ref.
2013	British Soap Awards	Sexiest Female	Nominated	
2013	Inside Soap Awards	Sexiest Female	Nominated	
