= Ray Dixon =

Fictional character from EastEnders

- EastEnders character
- Portrayed by: Chucky Venn
- Duration: 2012–2013
- First appearance: Episode 4355; 10 January 2012
- Last appearance: Episode 4646; 28 May 2013
- Introduced by: Bryan Kirkwood
In-universe information
- Occupation: Pub chef; Barman; Youth mentor; Boxing coach
- Wife: Deanne (backstory)
- Sons: Morgan Butcher
- Daughters: Sasha Dixon

Ray Dixon is a fictional character from the BBC soap opera EastEnders, played by Chucky Venn. Ray is an ex-partner of character Bianca Butcher (Patsy Palmer) and the father of her son Morgan Butcher (Devon Higgs). He made his first on screen appearance on 10 January 2012. His storylines have involved meeting and getting to know Morgan, a relationship with Kim Fox (Tameka Empson) and starting a youth mentoring scheme. On 16 April 2013, it was announced that Venn had been written out of the show, and departed on 28 May 2013.

== Creation and development ==
=== Casting ===
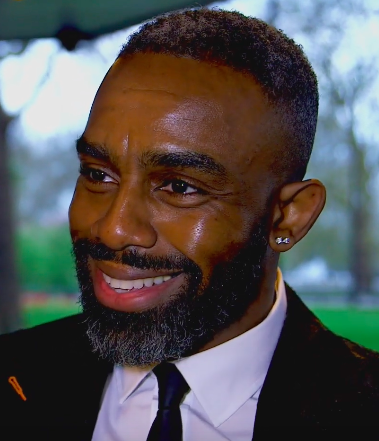
Chucky Venn (pictured) wrote twelve pages of Ray's backstory to impress the casting director and secure the role.

Venn heard from a friend that EastEnders were looking to cast Ray, and said that he thought "I could play that guy!" so contacted his agent to be put forward for the part. His agent told him that the producers were already interested in him for the part. Venn had previously worked with actor Jamie Foreman, who plays Derek Branning in the series, and when he discovered that Foreman was a part of the show, it made him more determined to get the part of Ray. He prepared 12 pages of his own back story for the character and imagined Ray's life as a child. Venn was eventually cast in the series, and was contracted for six months. Venn started filming in November 2011. The character and casting were then announced on 15 November 2011. Venn was a fan of EastEnders since he was about 12 years old, so he felt it was "a real privilege to now be a part of television history." He said of his casting, "I have had the pleasure of working on many great productions with fantastic artistes such as Morgan Freeman and I have to say working on EastEnders feels like it is up there with the best of them. EastEnders is etched in British history and it is an honour and a pleasure to be part of it." The first scenes that Venn filmed were with Shona McGarty (Whitney Dean), and Venn stated that it felt like "the first day at school".

=== Characterisation and backstory ===
Ray is a former army soldier, which Venn said taught him "discipline and how to handle himself in certain situations." He also said it makes Ray "strategic and tactical". Venn hoped that Ray's army past would catch up with him in a storyline. Venn has described him as "a noble fella" and "a man of principles [who] wants to honour his parental duties to the end, no matter what." He also said "Ray's a very honourable man, and committed to his children." Additionally, when Venn auditioned for the part, the character was pitched to him as "a charming family man and someone the ladies admire." Ray is described as "a good guy" who enjoys the gym, the pub and watching football matches. He had a hard childhood, but was loved by his mother and grandparents. From his grandmother he gained a love of Caribbean food and from his grandfather he took "a special kind of optimism". He got a girl from his estate pregnant before joining the army, which resulted in the birth of his daughter Sasha Dixon. Ray sees Sasha as "being the best thing in his life, but he wishes her mother didn't exist." Ray works as a pub chef, which he has done in various cities. He has no problems with women but is described as "a love 'em and leave 'em type." Inside Soap called him "cocky".

=== Notable relationships ===
==== Bianca and Morgan ====
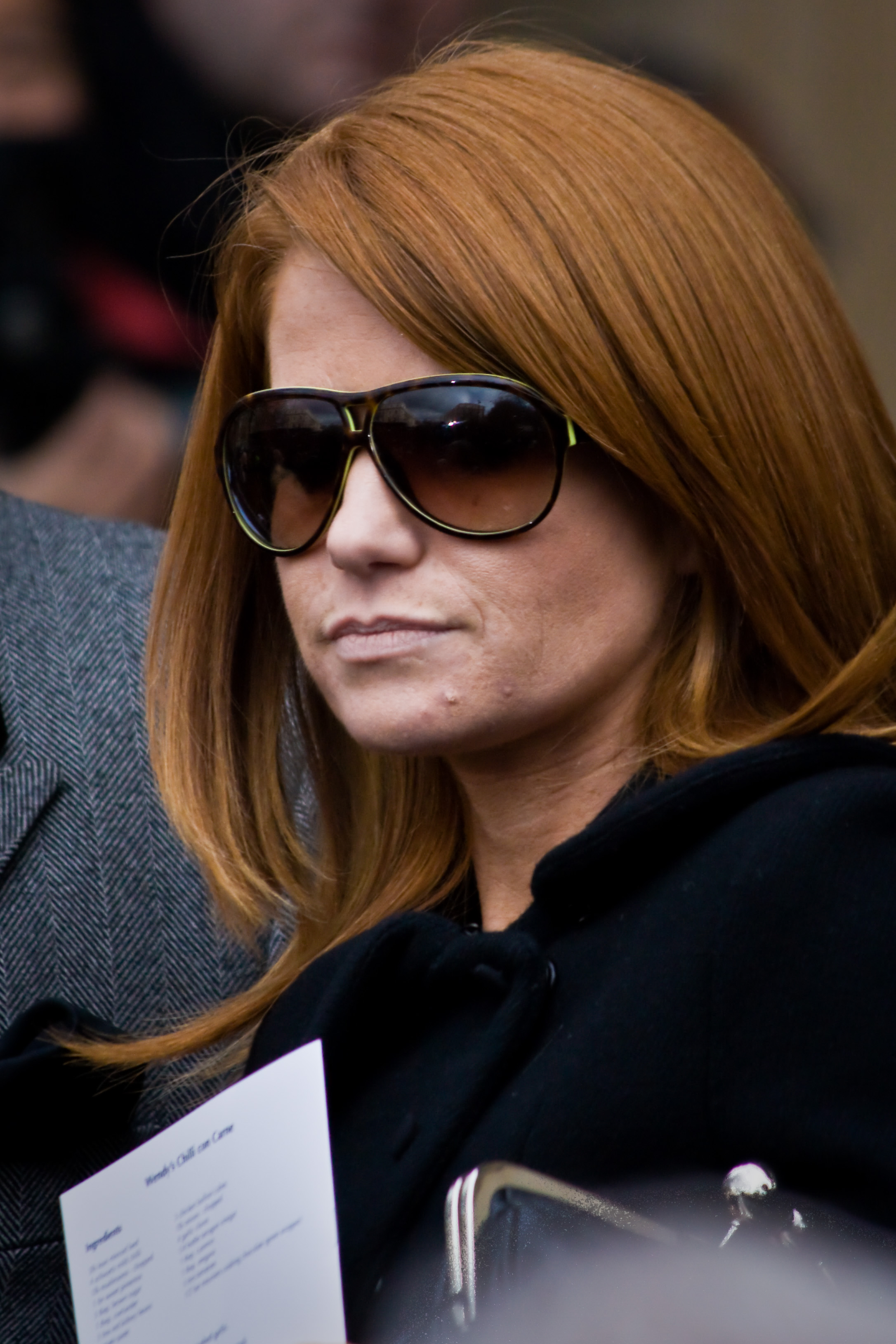
Ray's relationship with Bianca (Patsy Palmer, pictured) was described as "fraught".

Ray and Bianca had a relationship when she was living in Manchester, and he fell in love with her but it ended when she met Tony King and stole money from Ray. Bianca never told Ray that she had become pregnant by him. A source from EastEnders confirmed: "Ray hasn't seen Bianca for years and they didn't part on good terms. He meets Whitney as he has matters with Bianca that are unresolved. But Ray gets the shock of his life when Whitney tells him all about Morgan—and she soon realises that Ray knew nothing about his son." Ray's introduction to EastEnders was said to fill "another piece of the puzzle" of Bianca's life, as previously nothing about Morgan's paternity was known. The relationship between Ray and Bianca was described as "fraught". Venn described the relationship as "fiery" and explained that Ray respects Bianca, and said that there was a possibility of them reuniting. Venn told All About Soap that when Ray meets Morgan for the first time, he has mixed emotions because although he has met his son, Morgan does not know who he is, and thinks he is meeting Barack Obama. Venn opined that it would be "cathartic" for Ray, saying he would be sad as he has missed out on seven years of Morgan's life, and said that when they first meet, "it's a lovely moment [for] the two of them". An EastEnders insider explained that Ray is desperate to be a part of Morgan's life, and would do whatever it takes to be with him, even move to Albert Square, where Morgan's family are. Venn opined that Ray would strive to be a good father, saying "[he]'d take his parental responsibilities very seriously". After Bianca goes to prison in May 2012, Venn told Inside Soap that "Ray will do everything in his power to keep Morgan in his life".

==== Kim and Denise ====
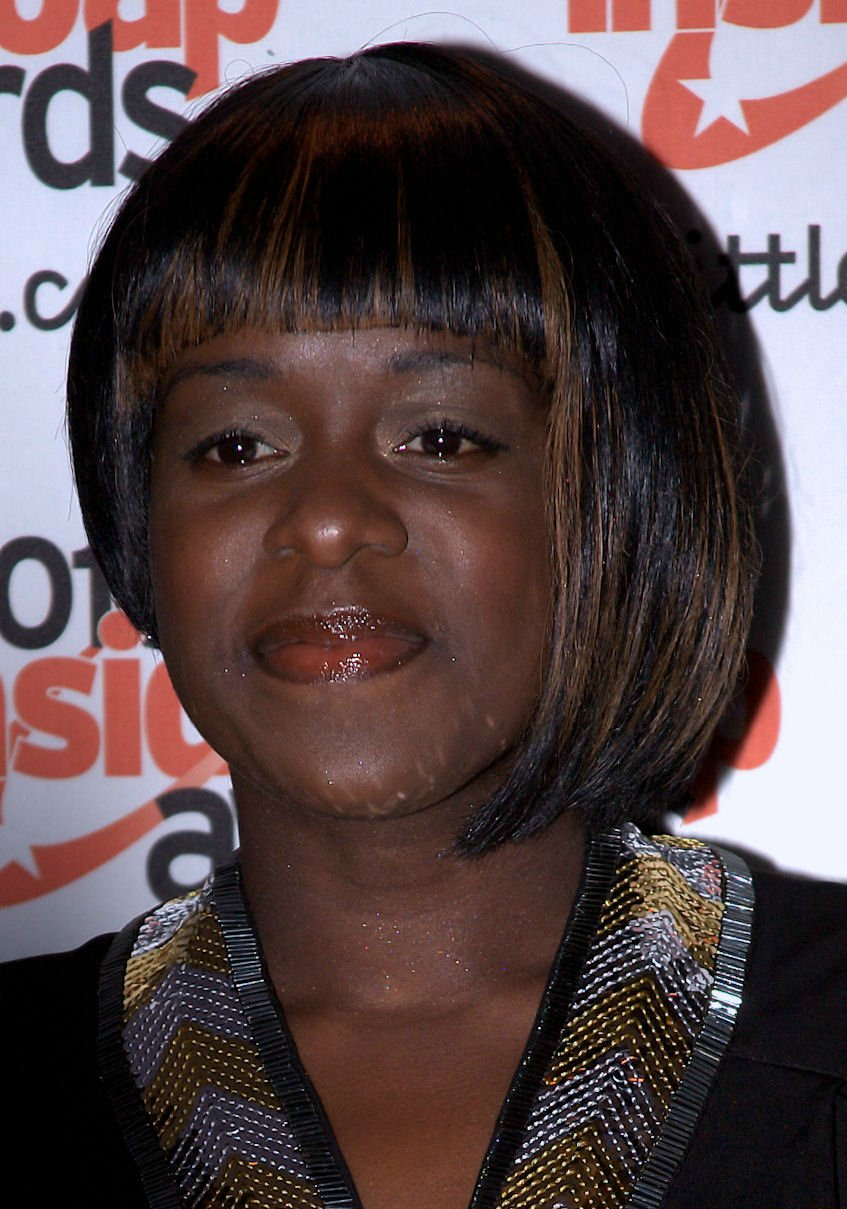
Tameka Empson (pictured) plays Ray's love interest, Kim Fox.

Kim plays hard to get with Ray for a number of weeks, until Ray admits his feelings for her in scenes broadcast in April 2012. Up until then, they argue a lot, which a writer for All About Soap insisted was sexual tension. An EastEnders insider told Inside Soap, "Pairing up Kim and Ray initially creates fireworks of entirely the wrong kind! But there's definitely something there, and [their colleagues] can see plain as day that they're meant to be together." Venn said in May 2012 that pairing up Kim and Ray creates "a dynamic comedic duo [which] brings comedic spice to the show."

Empson said in a May 2012 interview with Inside Soap that Kim did not consider Ray's children when she started flirting with him, but "She's been very honest with him about her feelings. but if you really like somebody, then you have to take the whole package." She went on to say that Kim and Ray "make a good couple" and that "Kim wants a bit of security, and her own family. Ray's a man's man, and she really thinks he could be a long-term love for her. That's why she did things differently with him, and didn't rush in. [...] With Ray, she's keeping her cards very close to her chest." Continuing, she explained that Ray is "something different" for Kim because he's "a decent guy", adding "I think she and Ray really complement each other—he's livened up a bit by her, while she learns a lot from him." Finally, she said that Ray likes that Kim is "her own woman. So together they made a really good team. Someone once said that Kim and Ray are like the Posh and Becks of Walford." Venn said that he thought it was "nice" for Ray to propose marriage to Kim, saying, "I imagine they would have a conventional wedding, then a reception with 70s fancy dress. [...] I'm sure nothing would be straightforward." He also said he would like to see them have a baby together, as it would be "interesting to see how Kim tackled being a mother." Empson said that if they were to get engaged, Kim would need a big ring, and Venn teased that Ray may have got the ring, since viewers were to see "the other side of Ray".

In December 2012, pictures emerged in the press of Ray kissing Kim's sister Denise Fox (Diane Parish). It was unknown at the time if it would lead to a relationship or remain a one-off. Venn praised the storyline, saying "Obviously it's about layers and showing the different sides of my character, so for me, this is a wonderful challenge. As an actor, I love challenges so I'm looking forward to seeing how this storyline develops. I think Kim would be quite peeved if she found out!" Venn explained Ray's reasons for kissing Denise, saying, "Ray reaches a point where he needs to come up for a breath of air, as there's only so much of Kim's heightened personality he can bear. Did Ray go for the wrong sister? Who knows? He probably has more in common with Denise than he ever had with Kim." He said that he felt bad about Ray kissing Denise because he is close to Empson and her character has been Ray's partner for about 10 to 11 months, and said it was "really weird" to film the kiss with Denise. The kiss, shown in January 2013, leads to Ray and Kim's relationship ending.

==== Other relationships ====
In an early storyline, Ray takes a disliking to Derek Branning (Jamie Foreman) when he stores illegal alcohol in the basement of The Queen Victoria. In May 2012, Venn opined that tension between Derek and Ray "could come to a head at some point soon. There's only so much one man can take, especially when it comes to racial abuse. [Ray will] know exactly when to attack, and won't hold back." Venn also said he could imagine Sasha's mother appearing on screen, saying, "EastEnders likes to keep you guessing, and I think that's a storyline with legs."

=== Possible affair with Kat Moon ===
In June 2012, it was announced that Kat Moon, played by Jessie Wallace, would embark on a long-running mystery affair with another Albert Square resident. The identity of the mystery man was kept secret from both cast and crew, as well as viewers, and all scenes of Kat with her lover were filmed with an extra. After the storyline was announced, Ray was announced as one of five suspects as potential love interests for Kat, along with, Michael Moon (Steve John Shepherd), Max Branning (Jake Wood), Derek Branning (Jamie Foreman) and Jack Branning (Scott Maslen). Speaking of the storyline, executive producer Lorraine Newman said: "The consequences are not only great for Kat and Alfie, but also for each individual suspect. The audience will join the cast and crew guessing across the summer and autumn as we eliminate the suspects one at a time, leading to one almighty explosion." Asked about the possibility that Ray could be Kat's lover, Venn said that "Kat's a saucy minx, and what man wouldn't want to get involved with her? Ray is a loyal, caring father—but we all have our dark sides. There's a lot the audience hasn't seen yet, put it that way." Daniel Kilkelly from entertainment website Digital Spy said that Ray appears to be a "decent family guy" and may not be the top suspect, but he is very flirtatious and his chef's job in The Queen Victoria, where Kat is landlady, would give him the perfect opportunity. However, he questioned the likelihood of Ray cheating on Kim. Ray was eliminated as a suspect in the episode broadcast on 7 August 2012, when he catches Kat on the phone to her lover.

=== Youth mentoring storyline ===
In September 2012, viewers see Ray become a victim of racial profiling by the police, and Kim suggests that Ray channel his negativity into mentoring youths. Venn spoke on This Morning, confirming that Ray would indeed start such a scheme. Venn praised the storyline and the fact that the character could show a more serious side, saying, "For me, of course, I was very impressed by EastEnders for even making the choice to tackle such a pertinent, very relevant issue. It felt very close to my heart." He went on to say that Ray would "help empower [youths], so they can equip themselves in situations similar to that—[to have] a bit more self-respect, know how to carry themselves and not deal with it in a violent or aggressive manner." Venn then stated that the storyline could establish Ray as "a more well-rounded character", saying, "It's about levels. There's different sides to every individual. It's nice that EastEnders have given me the opportunity to allow Ray to show the other sides. It just shows versatility."

=== Departure ===
On 16 April 2013, it was announced that Venn was leaving the show, with Ray making his final appearance in May, as producers had decided to write him out. Venn stated: "Working on EastEnders has been one of my career highlights and an invaluable experience. I couldn't have asked for a better team to work with and have found a lifelong friend in my on-screen partner Tameka [Empson]. I want to thank everyone who supported me on the show."

== Storylines ==
Ray is first mentioned in the episode broadcast on 9 January 2012, when Morgan asks about his father and Bianca says it is Barack Obama. Bianca's adopted daughter, Whitney Dean (Shona McGarty), knowing the truth, attempts to contact Ray. Whitney takes Morgan to meet Ray the next day, and he soon comes to Walford to see Morgan. He saves Kim Fox (Tameka Empson) from a falling ladder, and she is attracted to him. Bianca soon realises that Whitney has taken Morgan to meet Ray, but does not want them to see each other, and Kim is disappointed to learn that Ray has a son. Whitney soon convinces Bianca to let Morgan see Ray again. Ray returns shortly after, wanting to spend more time with his son and offering to cook a meal for Bianca's family, although when Ray reveals he has a daughter, Sasha Dixon (Rebecca Sanneh), Bianca throws him out. He successfully gets a job as a barman and chef at The Queen Victoria public house. On his first day, Sasha arrives meets Morgan and Kim. Ray asks Kim out on a date, but Bianca is angry so takes Morgan out, and Kim tells Ray she has had enough of men with "baggage". Ray continues to pursue Kim but she insists she is busy. Ray tells Bianca he wishes he could have been there for Morgan and how he changed his priorities for Sasha. Bianca misreads his kindness and goes to kiss him, but he turns away. When Ray discovers that Bianca is struggling with money, he gives her £300, saying it is for back-payments for Morgan. He starts to get somewhere with Kim but she suddenly leaves. He later hears from Kim's sister Denise Fox (Diane Parish) that Kim has caught head lice, so he gives Kim a hat to wear and they finally kiss. Kim becomes jealous when Ray playfights with Roxy Mitchell (Rita Simons) and later when he flirts with Bianca. As a result, she accidentally slices off the top of Ray's finger when he tries to help her fillet some fish. She accompanies him to the hospital where they open up to one another and decide to start a relationship.

After Bianca is imprisoned, her mother Carol Jackson (Lindsey Coulson) decides to move with Bianca's children closer to the prison. Ray realises he cannot make Morgan choose between him and his mother, so allows him to leave. Ray then invites Sasha to stay with him, but Kim says she cannot take on his children. However, Kim is soon forced to look after Sasha, which pleases Ray. Kim and Ray then declare their love for one another. Ray is thrilled when Morgan returns for the wedding of his aunt, Janine Butcher (Charlie Brooks). He bickers with Morgan's adoptive father, Ricky Butcher (Sid Owen) over his parenting methods, but the pair reconcile when Morgan gets upset and Ray thanks Ricky for bringing Morgan up in his absence. Ray moves into Kim's bed and breakfast when his landlord increases his rent. Kim tells Sasha she can organise some work experience for her with a forensic scientist. She later admits this was a lie, leading to Ray moving out. Kim then gets Sasha a placement with Les Coker's (Roger Sloman) firm of funeral directors, and Ray and Kim make up. Ray becomes secretive and Kim suspects he is having an affair. She then finds information about local flats and assumes that Ray is looking for somewhere for them both to live. However, Ray reveals that the flat is for Sasha's mother, Deanne, so they can both be closer to Sasha. Kim feels upset and humiliated. However, he affirms his love for her and they reconcile.

Ray is angry when a police officer stops him, suspecting him of a mugging. Ray claims that the police officer is being racist, but feels he cannot do anything about it, until Kim and Denise urge him to become a mentor for children facing similar circumstances. With funding from Sport England, he successfully starts his mentoring scheme, "Fighting Fit", at the local boxing club. When Denise is feeling sad about being single, Ray compliments and kisses her. He thinks Denise has told Kim, so says Denise kissed him, leading to Kim and Denise falling out after Kim slaps her. Ray then ends his relationship with Kim, saying they are too different, but she continues to send text messages in the hope they will reconcile. Ray flirts with Kirsty Branning (Kierston Wareing), upsetting Kim. A few months later, Ray learns that Sasha's mother has been in an accident. Kim and Ray start talking when she asks a favour for her bed and breakfast, while he struggles to cope with caring for Sasha and working at the pub. Kim helps Ray by cooking him dinner, which leads to them kissing. They resume their relationship, but Ray decides to leave Walford and his job to be closer to Sasha. Kim agrees to come with him, but at her birthday party, she realises that Ray does not know her very well, so she breaks up with him moments before they are due to leave together, and Ray leaves alone.

== Reception ==
Initial praise for Ray was based on his looks. A writer for All About Soap magazine described Ray as "hunky", "good-looking" and said that "this mysterious man might have everything going for him." Laura Morgan of All About Soap said that Ray's inclusion "ticks the hunky-man box very nicely". In a feature about "the boys of soapland who'll be lighting up our screens in the coming months", a writer for Inside Soap said in May 2012, "It's rare to meet a truly good man in soap. They generally come laden with baggage, burdened with dark secrets and—almost always—have the same attitude to monogamy as a cocker spaniel on heat. But Ray seems to be cut from a different cloth, and we love him for it."

In May 2012, Venn was nominated in the Best Newcomer category at the 2012 TVChoice Awards for his portrayal of Ray, but was not shortlisted for the award. He was then nominated in July 2012 for Best Newcomer at the 2012 Inside Soap awards.
