= Finlay Baker =

Fictional character from EastEnders

- EastEnders character
- Portrayed by: Ashley Byam
- Duration: 2022–23
- First appearance: Episode 6517; 7 July 2022
- Last appearance: Episode 6693; 28 June 2023
- Introduced by: Chris Clenshaw
In-universe information
- Occupation: Market trader
- Mother: Celia Baker
- Adoptive father: Avery Baker
- Half-brothers: Felix Baker
- Uncles: Mitch Baker (adoptive)
- Aunts: Rosina

Finlay Baker is a fictional character from the BBC soap opera EastEnders, played by Ashley Byam. The character and casting was announced in June 2022 and he made his first appearance on 7 July 2022. Finlay and his brother Felix Baker (Matthew James Morrison) were introduced as the sons of Avery Baker (Omar Lye-Fook) and the nephews of established character Mitch Baker (Roger Griffiths). Finlay, Felix and Avery were introduced by EastEnders executive producer Chris Clenshaw as the first of several new characters to be introduced to the soap. Byam was happy to join the soap, having grown up watching it, and felt that his hard work as an actor had paid off when he was cast. Finlay was characterised as being close with Felix and being cheeky and charming. Finlay's initial storyline involved moving to Walford after the death of Avery and starting a market stall. Finlay is involved in conflict when he bonds and later has sex with Dotty Cotton (Milly Zero) despite her being in a relationship with Vinny Panesar (Shiv Jalota). Finlay also unsuccessfully tries to woo Honey Mitchell (Emma Barton) and Whitney Dean (Shona McGarty). Byam later left the role and made his last appearance on 28 June 2023, which was not announced beforehand. His exit storyline saw him threatened and paid off to leave Walford by Ravi's family after finding out that he cut the brakes of his car in an attempt to kill Eve Unwin (Heather Peace). Finlay's departure was criticised by viewers.

== Casting ==
"I'm very excited to be joining the Square. Like many people I grew up with EastEnders; it was almost like an unspoken family tradition. My mum and I sat there together watching so many incredible and iconic storylines. So to now be joining this classic British TV drama is an honour, and I'm truly grateful. I can't wait for everyone to meet Finlay and see what lies ahead for him."

— Byam on joining EastEnders

On 6 June 2022, it was announced that EastEnders would be expanding the family of established character Mitch Baker (Roger Griffiths) by introducing his estranged brother, Avery Baker, played by Omar Lye-Fook, and his two sons Finlay and Felix Baker, played by Ashley Byam and Matthew James Morrison, respectively. Finlay was characterised as being "cheeky and charming", but it was teased that he would face a "a wake-up call" as he settles in. Finlay and Felix were characterised as being very different but "united" and always being there for each other. Finlay has a different biological to Felix, but was raised by Avery his whole life. It was also teased that whilst Mitch unconditionally loves and supports Finlay and Felix, their arrival would cause issues for him due to his difficult relationship with Avery. EastEnders executive producer Chris Clenshaw said of the characters, "The Baker Family bring a fresh, fierce, fun and exciting energy to the Square Felix and Finlay are two very different firecrackers and, yes, these brothers fall out, take the mick and challenge each other, but none of that compares to their unswerving love and loyalty they have for one another. They may be charming young men, full of sass, swagger and strength but these brothers are Bakers and, like their father, Avery, have their own unique way of surviving. Omar, Matthew and Ashley all bring star quality to EastEnders and we're excited to see them bring Avery, Felix and Finlay to life". By the time of the announcement, the actors had already begun filming on the soap, with pictures released of the three cast members on set. The family were reported to the first of several new characters to debut on the soap in the latter half of 2022 as part of Clenshaw putting his "stamp" on the soap amidst rumours of a "huge shake-up".

Byam called Finlay a "cheeky chappy" who has the "gift of the gab". He characterised Finlay as being protective of Felix and the pair having "great brotherly love" and always looking out for each, and being equal despite Finlay being older. Byam explained that Finlay does not care that he and Felix are not full biological siblings as "family is family", which Finlay explained in a scene in the soap. Morrison told Inside Soap that Felix and Finlay are very close and get on, although they do "have their tiffs". He described Felix, Finlay and Avery as being a "tight-knit unit" that argue but are there for each other. Morrison revealed that Finlay supported Felix with being gay from the beginning, which helped "solidify" their relationship. Morrison was glad to start on the soap with Byam as it made it less "daunting" to go through the experience of starting on the soap with someone else. Byam told Inside Soap that he loved Morrison and considered him a real brother, and that people assumed that the pair already knew each other as they got along so well. Byam revealed that he was excited when he got the call informing him that he had been cast on the soap, and said that being cast on EastEnders felt like his hard work had "paid off" and was significant. He added, "Someone has the belief that you can carry the weight of a big role as well as trusting you to bring that character to life". Speaking about working on the soap, Byam said, "It sounds so cliche to say but everybody is so supportive. It's such a warm and lovely community and everyone wants you to do well and make sure you're OK. There is genuine love and care that everyone has for you when you come into the show". He attributed Griffiths and Tameka Empson, who portrays Kim Fox, as being his mentors, calling them "amazing actors" and "amazing people" that he was glad to work with.

== Development ==
Finlay made his first appearance on 7 July 2022, alongside Felix. Finlay's first storyline revolved around the death of Avery from terminal cancer. When Avery, Mitch tries to find out why Avery has come back into his life. Avery arrives in Walford to reconcile with Mitch and collapses during an argument with him. Felix and Finlay arrive to the hospital to meet with Felix, Mitch and his partner Karen Taylor (Lorraine Stanley), and they reveal that Avery has terminal cancer. Following the airing of this reveal, it was reported that Avery would be killed-off not long after his debut. Trying to make peace with his brother, Mitch organises a Caribbean-themed surprise party for Avery, which he enjoys; however, he dies during the gathering. Following his death, Karen and Harvey Monroe (Ross Boatman) encourage Mitch to support Felix and Finlay, so he invites them to lunch to talk about funeral plans. An EastEnders insider revealed that Finlay and Felix feel "lost" without their father and do not know how to plan his funeral, and thus need Mitch to take care of the arrangements and give them emotional support. Mitch finds out that Felix and Finlay have expensive taste, and he then finds out some "shocking news" from a letter that Avery left him, and he prepares to tell Felix and Finlay what he found out.

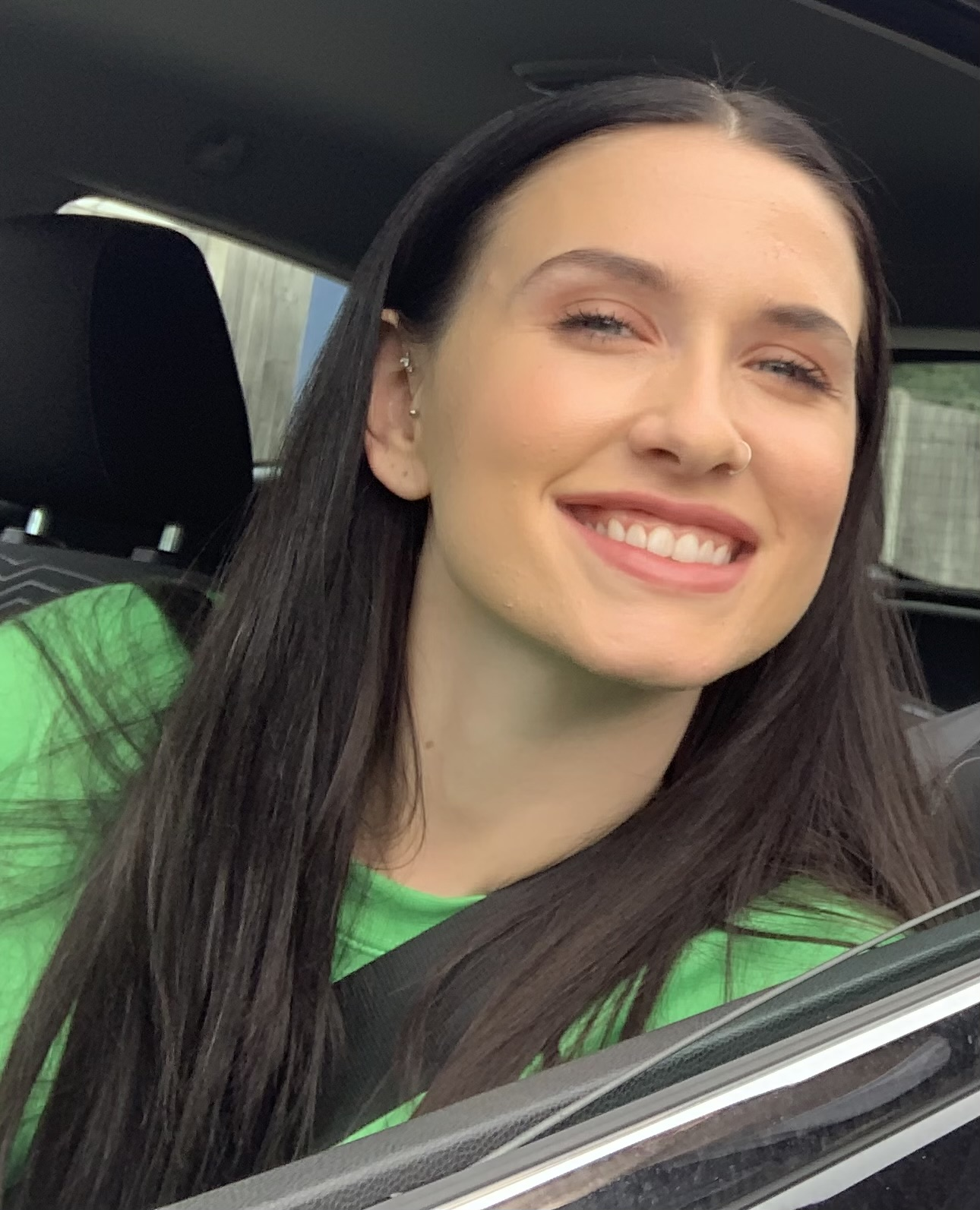
Milly Zero portrays Dotty Cotton, who Finlay bonds and has sex with.

Finlay helps Honey Mitchell (Emma Barton) when she is hassled by Mr Lister (Nick Wilton) into going on a date with him by pretending to be her boyfriend. When Honey declines a date with Finlay, he realises that her ex Billy Mitchell (Perry Fenwick) still has feelings for her and he decides to matchmake them together. Billy also helps Finlay when he decides that he wants to own food stall on the market, and Billy is impressed with Finlay's "charm and confidence" at his stall. On a night out with several residents, a spark develops between Finlay and Whitney Dean (Shona McGarty), which makes Vinny Panesar (Shiv Jalota) insecure about his own relationship with Dotty Cotton (Milly Zero). Finlay later becomes closer with Dotty after they bond over the deaths of their fathers. Dotty's boyfriend Vinny is devastated when he sees the pair having a drink together and he gets extremely jealous of their growing friendship. Consumed with jealousy, Vinny ends up punching Finlay, which makes Dotty furious with him, and she ends up going home with Finlay and having sex with him. The morning after, Bernadette Taylor (Clair Norris) and Tom "Rocky" Cotton (Brian Conley) convince Dotty to do the right thing and by being honest about what happened. A "lovesick" Vinny is devastated when Dotty tells him the truth and becomes enraged when Finlay tries to intervene.

Byam later left the role and made his last appearance on 28 June 2023. His exit had not been announced beforehand. In the storyline, Vinny tampers with the brakes of Finlay's car as he is aware that Eve Unwin (Heather Peace) is going to drive it to Brighton, wanting revenge for having an affair with his mother Suki Panesar (Balvinder Sopal). Although Suki stops this by slashing the tires in order to save Eve, Finlay is spooked by this and is unsure of why Vinny would want to harm him. Finlay threatens to call the police on Vinny after finding his necklace in the car, believing that his long-term rival was trying to kill him. Vinny's half-brother Ravi Gulati (Aaron Thiara) tries to threaten Finlay into keeping quiet, and he gets thugs to destroy Finlay's stall when Finlay refuses to listen. After confronting Suki, Finlay realises that Eve was the intended target, which leaves Suki worried that her affair will be exposed; Finlay then uses the situation to his advantage to blackmail Suki for money in exchange for leaving Walford, which she agrees to. Finlay also threatens that he will be back if he hears that Ravi has gone near Felix. Finlay's family is shocked when he announced that he is moving to Dublin as he has had an offer to buy his special sauce, leaving Felix saddened. Finlay then has a final drink with his family and then leaves Walford in Avery's old car. Following the airing of the episode, Radio Times reported that EastEnders had confirmed that Byam had stopped filming on the soap.

== Storylines ==
Finlay and his brother Felix Baker (Matthew James Morrison) meet their uncle Mitch Baker (Roger Griffiths) when their father Avery Baker (Omar Lye-Fook) collapses in hospital. Finlay and Felix then attend a party thrown for Avery by Mitch and his family. During the gathering, Avery dies from his terminal cancer in Mitch's arms, leaving Felix and Finlay devastated. Felix and Finlay plan to give their father an expensive funeral but Mitch tells them that he died with a lot of debt, and they fail to stop a debt collector taking Avery's car. Finlay and Felix move in with Mitch after being kicked out of their home due to Avery not having paid the bills. Finlay meets Whitney Dean (Shona McGarty) and convinces her to sell some stuff on her stall to raise money for Avery's funeral. At Avery's funeral, Finlay defends Felix when he dresses up in his drag alter ego, Tara Misu. Finlay and Felix decide to stay at Mitch's home and plan to open a market stall. Finlay helps Honey Mitchell (Emma Barton) when Mr Lister (Nick Wilton) hassles her for a date, pretending that Honey is his girlfriend. Honey and Finlay get to know each other and she agrees to give the brothers the pitch on the market, but she rejects Finlay's offer of going on a date. Finlay opens the stall on the market, and he and Felix later host a Caribbean themed party at the Queen Vic pub.

Finlay bonds with Dotty Cotton (Milly Zero) over the deaths of their fathers and she accepts his offer of a drink, making her boyfriend Vinny Panesar (Shiv Jalota) jealous. Although Finlay invites Vinny to join them, he gets jealous when he sees Finlay and Dotty whispering and he punches Finlay but then apologises. Dotty takes Finlay out for food to make up for Vinny's punch and confides in him about her relationship issues, and the pair later have sex. Finlay tells Felix in the pub that he likes Dotty enough to see her again, and they watch as Vinny confronts Dotty when she admits her cheating. Vinny tries to punch Finlay again but misses. Finlay and Felix later move in with Whitney and Chelsea Fox (Zaraah Abrahams). Finlay develops a crush on Whitney and confesses this to her, but she does not feel the same way so they agree to stay friends. Finlay later inherits Avery's old car, which needs repairing, so Keanu Taylor (Danny Walters) fixes it for him, annoying Vinny's half-sister Ash Panesar (Gurlaine Kaur Garcha). Finlay flirts with her and a disgusted Ash rejects him. Finlay later finds Avery's necklace stuck underneath the car and sells it to help Mitch pay off the bills.

Vinny discovers that his mother Suki Panesar (Balvinder Sopal) has been having an affair with Eve Unwin (Heather Peace) and plans to kill Eve by cutting the brakes of Finlay's car, as he has heard that Felix is planning to drive there with Eve for Brighton Pride. Keanu finds the broken brakes and tells Vinny, giving him the necklace that he found in the car. Finlay recognises that it is Vinny's necklace and confronts him and threatens to go to the police. Vinny tries to get his half-brother Ravi Gulati (Aaron Thiara) to scare Finlay, but this is unsuccessful, so he gets people to smash up Finlay's market stall. Knowing it was Ravi, Finlay confronts Suki, and realises that Vinny was trying to kill Eve and that there is something more personal going on and threatens to tell Eve. Suki gets Ravi to threaten Finlay's life to get him to leave Walford; Finlay agrees to leave but demands money from Suki, who gives it to him. Finlay then leaves Walford.

== Reception ==
Iona Rowan from Digital Spy called Finlay "observant" when he noticed that Billy still had feelings for Honey. Her colleague, Joe Julians, noted how things had "really heated up" between Finlay and Dotty when they had sex. In August 2022, Sue Haasler from Metro believed that Finlay could be the "kind, thoughtful man" that Whitney could have a settled romance and "happy ending" with, noting how Finlay had "already made an impact" despite not being in the soap for long. Charlotte Bateman from MyLondon called Finlay "charming". Calli Kitson from Metro wrote that Finlay's life got "a whole lot darker" when he discovered that someone cut the brakes of his car and opined that other than "some relationship drama", Finlay had not "really seen his fair share of what Walford has to offer – and we're talking your fires, explosions, murders, not an offer in the Minute Mart or getting into an argument with someone in the pub".

Following Finlay's departure, Laura-Jayne Tyler from Inside Soap noted how Tara did not seem to dwell on Finlay's departure for too long and wrote, "Bye then, Finlay. Gone almost a year to the week that the Baker bros arrived in Walford with such promise. But hey – that's showbiz!" Laura Denby from Radio Times blamed Finlay's departure on the "menacing from the ruthless Panesars". Charlotte Tutton from the Daily Mirror called Finlay's exit "sudden" and "abrupt" and reported how viewers were unhappy with his exit and some expressed on social media that Finlay was not given a "chance". Tutton and Kirsten McStay from the Daily Mirror and the Daily Record also reported how some viewers were angry that the scenes that saw Finlay threatened to leave Walford and the hint of his exit, which aired in his penultimate episode, aired in the same episode that featured the funeral of Lola Pearce (Danielle Harold); she reported that some viewers wrote on social media that this "ruined" the episode and that some viewers were unhappy with Finlay's exit and believed that he had not been given the right storyline.
