= Whitney Dean =

Fictional character from EastEnders

- EastEnders character
- Shona McGarty as Whitney Dean (2023)
- Portrayed by: Shona McGarty; Phoebe Farnham (2020 flashback)
- Duration: 2008–2024, 2026
- First appearance: Episode 3553; 1 April 2008
- Last appearance: Episode 7336; 26 May 2026
- Introduced by: Diederick Santer (2008); Ben Wadey (2026)
- Spin-off appearances: Last Tango in Walford (2010); EastEnders: E20 (2010); The Queen Vic Quiz Night (2020)
- Crossover appearances: East Street (2010)
In-universe information
- Other names: Whitney Carter
- Occupation: Student; Market trader; Barmaid; Teaching assistant; Waitress; Taxi controller
- Family: Beale/Jackson
- Father: Nathan Dean
- Mother: Debra Dean
- Adoptive mother: Bianca Jackson
- Stepfather: Ricky Butcher (adoptive)
- Half-brothers: Ryan Malloy; Liam Butcher (adoptive); Morgan Butcher (adoptive)
- Half-sisters: Tiffany Butcher (adoptive)
- Husband: Lee Carter (2016–2017)
- Daughters: Peach; Dolly Dean-Hudson
- Adoptive daughters: Britney Wainwright (foster)
- Grandfathers: David Wicks (adoptive)
- Grandmothers: Carol Jackson (adoptive)
- Aunts: Sonia Fowler (adoptive)
- Nieces: Lily Slater
- First cousins: Bex Fowler (adoptive); Julia Fowler (adoptive); Sami Jackson (adoptive)
- Other relatives: Charli Slater; Pat Butcher (adoptive)

Whitney Dean (also Carter) is a fictional character from the BBC soap opera EastEnders, played by Shona McGarty. The character is the ward of established character Bianca Jackson (Patsy Palmer) and was introduced on 1 April 2008 when Palmer returned to the series following a nine-year absence. Whitney is described by executive producer Diederick Santer as both an equal to, and younger version of Bianca, and is the oldest of Bianca's four children. Whitney was absent from the soap across four weeks in 2012 when McGarty was suspended for repeated lateness. McGarty took a short break in 2017 and Whitney departed on 29 May and returned on 31 July of that year. On 1 June 2018, McGarty filmed her 1,000th episode as Whitney. On 29 July 2023, it was announced that McGarty had resigned from her role following fifteen years, and Whitney departed from the soap on 23 May 2024. Whitney made an unannounced return on 25 May 2026 for two episodes.

From debut on the show, Whitney became known for often being involved in tragic storylines, including the fracturing of her family life; her sexual abuse by Bianca's fiancé Tony King (Chris Coghill); her sexual exploitation by local pimp Rob Grayson (Jody Latham); her one-night stand with Joey Branning (David Witts) in the midst of being engaged to her first fiancé Tyler Moon (Tony Discipline); her marriage with Lee Carter (Danny Hatchard) that ultimately breaks down as a result of his depression; Lee's infidelity with Abi Branning (Lorna Fitzgerald), which resulted in him passing chlamydia to Whitney and consequently led her to miscarry their unborn baby; her romantic crush on Lee's father Mick (Danny Dyer); her wedding to Callum Highway (Tony Clay) that ends in disaster after she learns that he is having a romantic affair with Ben Mitchell (Max Bowden); being stalked by Tony's vengeful son Leo King (Tom Wells), which soon culminates with Whitney stabbing and killing him in self-defence; accidentally running over her close friend Kat Slater (Jessie Wallace) and then fleeing the scene; being impregnated by Zack Hudson (James Farrar); discovering that her baby has Edwards syndrome and omphalocele, which ultimately leads to her deciding to terminate her pregnancy; and illegally fostering Britney Wainwright (Lola Campbell).

The child sexual abuse storyline between Whitney and Tony marked the first time that the subject matter has been broached in a UK soap opera; the matter was researched and developed with advice and approval from the National Society for the Prevention of Cruelty to Children (NSPCC). The inappropriate nature of Whitney's relationship with Tony resulted in over 200 complaints being made to the BBC and television regulatory body Ofcom by members of the public, and was described by the Daily Mirror's Beth Neil as "one of the darkest and most disturbing storylines EastEnders has ever attempted". However, the NSPCC praised the storyline for "helping to raise awareness of the hidden nature of sexual abuse". The storyline also gained EastEnders a Royal Television Society Programme Award in 2009 in the Soap and Continuing Drama category.

== Creation ==
In October 2007, it was announced that the character Bianca Jackson was returning to EastEnders after an absence of six years. Whitney was created as part of her new family; the daughter of Bianca's deceased partner Nathan Dean. She was described as "a teenage drama queen, unable to engage brain before mouth and constantly finding herself in and out of trouble". Bianca sees Whitney as one of her own, and also as "a friend and confidante". EastEnders' executive producer Diederick Santer said that his vision for the character was someone "quite spiky, quite gobby, a bit of an equal to Bianca, and in a way a version of Bianca at that age". Shona McGarty was cast in the role.

Considering the character's role in the wider context of the show as a whole, it was decided that Whitney would be involved in a sexual relationship with Bianca's partner Tony King. BBC News described the plot as an ongoing "predatory paedophile storyline", noting that this was the first time this subject matter had been tackled by a UK soap opera. The storyline was conceived when EastEnders series consultant Simon Ashdown viewed a documentary about homelessness, featuring a mother and child at a bus stop with nowhere to go. Ashdown questioned what might happen if a paedophile were to befriend the mother in order to grow closer to the child, and related the scenario to Bianca's return to the soap. BBC Head of Drama John Yorke explained that the idea when presented "drew a sharp intake of breath. Most EastEnders stories that have been good and successful have been the ones that caused the sharp intake of breath, so they're always the kind of stories you look for."

The idea that McGarty play a child groomed for sex was put to the actress on 9 January 2008. Santer has stated that, had McGarty or her parents objected to the storyline, they would not have gone ahead with it. In the event, McGarty's parents merely requested that their daughter not be asked to publicise the role, and the actress began filming her first scenes on 14 January 2008.

McGarty filmed her 1000th episode as Whitney in June 2018, over ten years after she joined the soap. In 2020, Phoebe Farnham portrayed a younger version of the character in a hallucination experienced by Whitney.

== Development ==
=== Sexual abuse ===
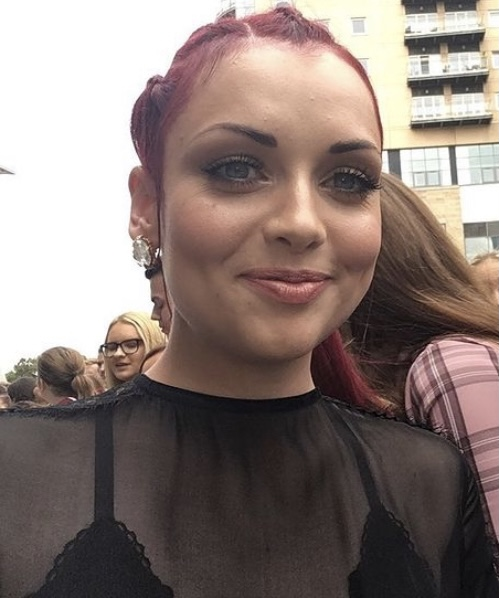
McGarty was considered perfect for a grooming storyline since she did not look or act like a child, showing how anyone under 18 can be affected.

In order to develop Whitney's sexual abuse storyline, by March 2008 EastEnders researchers Libby Duplock and Cleo Bicat were in contact with the NSPCC's Tom Narducci, Jude Toasland, who deals with abused children, and Yvonne Traynor, CEO of the Rape and Sexual Abuse Support Centre. Duplock has stated that: "One thing that was quite difficult for me to get right was the idea that she didn't want sex. It's Whitney's way of keeping Tony happy. If she lets him do it, then he's nicer to her and he makes her feel special." Research highlighted the fact that 12% of abused children go on to become abusers in turn, however Duplock explained: "We felt that to imply on TV that someone who has been abused is going to go on to abuse other people is not a message you want to give out. Those people have been through enough." Narducci for the NSPCC stated that importance was placed on making children viewing the show "feel comfortable about asking for help if they felt they needed it [and] for the wider community – to recognise the signs and let them know that they can do something about it. [...] We're not trying to cause a national panic. This is a responsible effort to try to get over an important story."

It had initially been decided that, alongside Tony's sexual abuse, Whitney would be seen to self-harm. This aspect of the storyline was discarded, after the NSPCC suggested that it may distract from the main issue of her abuse. Final approval for the storyline was sought from BBC Head of Fiction Jane Tranter on 2 June 2008. Tranter explained:

"I thought it was a fantastically good idea. The big moments in EastEnders, those iconic pieces of television history, tend to be the things that are incredibly near the knuckle, and are actually quite difficult subjects to raise in the context of a family sitting room. [...] Soaps are meant to hold up a mirror to our lives, and sometimes that mirror will show ugly bits, difficult bits, taboo bits. But if a soap doesn't hold up that mirror, then actually, what is it? It will have no depth."

Chris Coghill was cast as Whitney's abuser Tony on 20 June 2008. Upon accepting the role, he commented: "Shona doesn't act, or look, like a little child. Which helps." He has added of their off-screen relationship: "Shona's fantastic to work with. She's very natural, very instinctive and a natural actress. There isn't any uncomfortable feeling at all." Having undergone a thorough characterisation session, Coghill began shooting on 30 June 2008, and first appeared on-screen on 12 September 2008. Coghill has explained that Tony began grooming Whitney as soon as he met Bianca, ingratiating himself so as to become the family's "hero figure" and "saviour". Discussing his character's relationship with Whitney, Coghill explained that: "The lie that Tony has spun to Whitney is that as soon as she's 16 they'll run away together and start a new life. But Tony's the type of paedophile who preys on younger children. Whitney is beginning to pass her sell-by date with him. [...] He feels like he's losing his little girl but needs to keep Whitney under his control and not speak out." Coghill stated that: "This is the most challenging role I have had to play. But I hope by EastEnders tackling the sensitive issue of child abuse it can raise awareness." When asked how she felt about the abuse storyline, Palmer commented: "It would be brilliant if it helped somebody. If one person out there who's been abused saw [the legal system] go out of their way to make it easier on the victim – Whitney's evidence is given by video link – it will be worth it."

=== Sexual exploitation ===
In January 2011, it was announced that Whitney would be part of an upcoming storyline on sexual exploitation. Whitney is left alone and vulnerable, and falls for a man, Rob Grayson, played by Jody Latham, who exploits her for financial gain. EastEnders worked alongside charity Comic Relief on the storyline, which started planning in 2010. The storyline culminated during Red Nose Day 2011 on 19 March 2011, in a special ten-minute episode. Gilly Green, Head of UK Grants at Comic Relief, said: "It is vital that we continue to alert young people to the dangers if we are to stop them being exploited and the opportunity to work with EastEnders will make a huge audience aware of this issue. We have been working with the EastEnders script writers and some of the young women from projects we support to ensure the story reflects the reality of young people caught up in sexual exploitation." Kevin Cahill, Chief Executive of Comic Relief, added "We have worked over many years with EastEnders in all kinds of ways. It's been a real pleasure this year to work together on a piece of serious drama, in the best traditions of public service, which will highlight an important issue and also, because it occurs on the night of Comic Relief, actually help raise crucial funds to help young women caught up in it." The storyline begins when Bianca is sent to prison and Whitney rejects her family, moving in with Janine and attempting to make money by stealing from The Queen Victoria, causing her to get sacked, working for Max, whom she tries to kiss as she has a crush on him, and pickpocketing. When she is caught, Rob rescues her from the situation and offers her what McGarty called a "dream life", which Whitney thinks is her chance to move up in the world as she feels lonely and has no friends.

McGarty told Inside Soap that she hoped the storyline would have a positive impact, saying that she had done some research herself before filming, meeting teenage girls who had been exploited and hearing their experiences. She said she felt honoured and privileged to be given the storyline.

=== Temporary exit ===
McGarty was suspended from the show in July 2012 across four weeks for "persistent lateness to arrive on set". A show insider described her lateness as a big problem because it "regularly held up the filming of vital scenes." McGarty apologised for her lateness. In 2016, she discussed her suspension with The Sun magazine Fabulous and said her actions were "lazy and irresponsible" and the suspension made her realise the consequences of her actions. McGarty promised fans that she was now punctual for work.

=== Departure ===
On 29 July 2023, it was announced that Whitney would be leaving the show in early 2024, after McGarty chose to quit her role after over 15 years. Speaking of her decision to leave, McGarty said: "I have decided to spread my wings and will be leaving EastEnders. I have loved my years in the show. I have been trusted with some incredible storylines and have made amazing friendships — and family — which will endure." Prior to Whitney's departure, a special episode aired on 4 March 2024, where Whitney and Zack visit Bianca in Milton Keynes, which prompted future storylines for the couple.

== Other appearances ==
Whitney appears in the spin-off DVD, Last Tango in Walford, which focuses on Tiffany and Liam in the run up to Bianca and Ricky's wedding. The DVD was released 8 February 2010. In the DVD, Whitney also features in dancing to Girls Aloud's "Love Machine" alongside other characters. Angie Quinn from MyLondon called the dance "iconic".

Whitney makes a cameo appearance in episode eight of the second series of the Internet spin-off series EastEnders: E20, in which she buys some trainers from Asher Levi (Heshima Thompson) but later returns them as they are of different sizes. Jane Beale (Laurie Brett) joins the argument and snatches Asher's wallet when he says he does not give refunds, but he snatches it back. Jane tells two police officers he is a thief and they chase after him. The episode aired on 30 September 2010.

== Storylines ==
Whitney makes her first appearance as the adopted daughter of her legal guardian Bianca Jackson (Patsy Palmer) alongside Bianca's young biological daughter Tiffany Dean (Maisie Smith) and her two brothers Liam Butcher (James Forde) and Morgan Jackson-King (Devon Higgs). As Whitney settles herself in Walford with her family, they get reacquainted with Bianca's boyfriend Tony King (Chris Coghill) following his release from prison. When Whitney and Tony reunite in her bedroom, they kiss and Tony tells Whitney their relationship is back on and that they will move away together. It is then revealed that Tony is a paedophile who has been sexually abusing Whitney by grooming her since she was 12. When Bianca harangues him about the prospect of marriage, he gives her Whitney's money to put a down-payment on a flat. When Whitney and her classmate Peter Beale (Thomas Law) are cast in a school play, Tony is secretly envious of them rehearsing in private and punches Peter out of jealously. Whitney convinces Peter and his sister Lucy (Melissa Suffield) not to report the attack to the police, but Tony blames her for the incident and ends their affair. Devastated when Tony accepts Bianca's marriage proposal, Whitney locks herself in her bedroom. Bianca takes her away on holiday, attempting to mend their relationship. When they return, Tony and Whitney share a passionate kiss, and Tony informs Whitney that their relationship is back on.

When Tony begins grooming Whitney's friend Lauren Branning (Madeline Duggan) into harbouring romantic feelings for him, Whitney becomes jealous and demands Tony to focus on her rather than Lauren. Tony loses interest in Whitney but on the day she turns sixteen, Whitney confesses her relationship with Tony to Bianca. Horrified, she confronts Tony and realises that he has been abusing Whitney all along. She calls the police and Tony is arrested, to Whitney's dismay and outrage. In the build-up to Tony's trial, Whitney contacts her biological mother Debra Dean (Ruth Gemmell) and tries to discuss the past; however, Debra is not interested and rejects her. Debra later tells Whitney she has a half-brother, Ryan Malloy (Neil McDermott). Whitney tries to take back her statement against Tony but after Whitney's barrister sees her mobile phone containing the messages from Tony, he is sentenced to 13 years' imprisonment.

Whitney falls in love with Connor Stanley (Arinze Kene), but their relationship ends when Whitney finds out that Connor has been two-timing with her and Bianca's mother Carol (Lindsey Coulson). She decides to move out and stays with Ricky's sister and Ryan's wife Janine Butcher (Charlie Brooks). After Whitney sees Janine successfully pickpocket someone, she decides to try it herself – but ends up being hit in the face. Whitney is approached by Rob Grayson (Jody Latham), who helps her and buys her food before returns her to Albert Square; he also gives Whitney his phone number before she returns home. Whitney contacts Rob and asks to stay with him – to which he accepts. She throws her phone away and tells nobody that she is going. Janine lies about Whitney's whereabouts but when she admits she does not know where Whitney is, Lauren (now played by Jacqueline Jossa) and Janine attempt to find her, and Lauren sees her in Dartford going into a club. Lauren goes back with her to her bedsit, but Whitney does not want to go, saying she and Rob are in love. Whitney has sex with a man called Chris (Richard Simons) and it is revealed that Whitney has been having sex with Rob's friends to pay off his debts to them. Rob locks her in a room so she breaks the window and escapes, stopping a car and asking for help. The following month, she sends Lauren a message and meets her outside the police station, as she has been arrested for shoplifting. When Whitney starts a relationship with a man named Lee (Mitchell Hunt), it is revealed that he is a friend of Rob's, and when Whitney agrees to meet Lee by text, Rob takes control of Lee's mobile phone. She allows Rob to take her home but then tells him to wait outside while she escapes through the back door and hitches a lift to Southend-on-Sea with friends. Rob finds her and Fatboy (Ricky Norwood) calls Ryan to help, who fights with Rob on the pier. The pair fall in and Rob dies.

Whitney and Fatboy begin a relationship, but she soon feels smothered by Fatboy's affections and falls for Tyler Moon (Tony Discipline), who she begins dating after admitting to Fatboy that she does not like him romantically. Whitney and Tyler plan to get their own home and he soon proposes to Whitney; she accepts. She receives a letter from Tony, asking Whitney to visit him in prison. Whitney visits but is told that he has committed suicide. Trying to come to terms with Tony's death, she goes out for lunch with Tyler, but they argue which leads to Whitney ending their engagement. Joey Branning (David Witts) comforts her and the pair have sex. She tells Tyler, who leaves Walford. Whitney later sets her sights on Johnny Carter (Sam Strike), unaware that he is gay. Johnny's parents, Mick (Danny Dyer) and Linda Carter (Kellie Bright), hope that Johnny and Whitney will become an item, but his sister Nancy Carter (Maddy Hill) reveals to them that he is gay. A few weeks later, Johnny comes out to Whitney, which hurts her as she feels that Johnny has been using her. They later become good friends and Whitney forgives Johnny.

When Johnny's elder brother, Lee Carter (Danny Hatchard), returns from serving in Afghanistan, Whitney takes an instant liking to him and they share a kiss. After they begin a relationship, she moves into the Queen Vic pub with the Carters. Lee develops depression, and when Whitney finds out, she struggles to support him. Whitney later thanks Mick for helping her with Lee, but accidentally kisses him on the lips in the process. Whitney is forced by Babe Smith (Annette Badland) to tell Lee about her kissing Mick, and although Nancy tells her to move out, Lee's response is to propose marriage. When they are both diagnosed with chlamydia, Abi Branning (Lorna Fitzgerald) confesses that she and Lee had sex, which is how it got transmitted to them. Whitney initially ends their relationship and considers leaving Walford, but later decides to give him another chance. Whitney learns that she is pregnant but suffers spotting and is taken to hospital with Lee, Linda and Mick, where the bleeding gets heavier. A scan shows Whitney has miscarried her baby, devastating her and Lee. Whitney marries Lee but the pair soon begin arguing over money. She finds his wage slip showing how little he earns. A bus crashes into the market and Whitney is trapped underneath it. She is rescued, and in hospital she talks to Mick about her marriage. He comforts her and she kisses him again, which is seen by Denise Fox (Diane Parish). Whitney decides to organise a night out and pawns her wedding ring for cash. Lee discovers what she has done and they start arguing. When Whitney says he doesn't deserve her, Lee slaps her in the face. She decides to give Lee another chance on the condition that he will never assault her again, and he agrees; however, on Valentine's Day, Lee leaves Whitney, leaving a handwritten note on their bed saying he no longer loves her. He returns the following day, apologising to Whitney for his actions and tells her of his plans to move away.

Whitney grows close to new bar manager Woody Woodward (Lee Ryan). Lee wants a divorce and she receives a letter from Lee's solicitor, citing her unreasonable behaviour as grounds for the divorce. Whitney and Woody kiss and have sex and Mick finds them in bed together. Mick finds items that Whitney has shoplifted and she says she should never have married Lee as she is damaged and only good for sex. When Whitney is depressed and vulnerable, Mick kisses her, to which she responds. When Shirley Carter (Linda Henry) finds out about the kiss, she orders Whitney to leave. Whitney returns two months later. She moves back into the Queen Vic and takes back her barmaid job. Whitney reveals that she is engaged to Woody and asks Mick to give her away at their wedding. Linda throws her out after she realises that she is the person Mick kissed. When Woody is offered a job in Spain as a bar manager, he asks Whitney to come with him and she accepts. However, at the last minute, Whitney discovers a note outside the tube station from Woody saying that she is better to remain in Walford. Tiffany arranges a date between Whitney and Callum "Halfway" Highway (Tony Clay), but Whitney leaves the date after being put off by his behaviour. However, she warms to him and they begin a relationship, eventually trying for a baby. Whitney and Halfway become engaged and during their respective stag and hen parties, Halfway confesses to having kissed Ben Mitchell (Max Bowden). Whitney insists that she loves Halfway, but jilts him at the altar and encourages him not to live a lie with his sexuality.

Whitney returns from a solo honeymoon and announces that she has met another man. The man is revealed to be Leo (Tom Wells), who, unbeknownst to Whitney, is the son of Tony. Leo takes Whitney to a hotel and Tiffany asks Bianca who Leo is. Once she finds out he is Tony's son, she calls Whitney to tell her, and she and Halfway rush to the hotel to find her. Whitney tries to leave the hotel room but Leo does not let her, yelling at her to admit that she and Bianca had made up the story that Tony had abused Whitney. She agrees to tell him the truth and goes on to explain what really happened – that Tony did abuse her as a child and that she has finally accepted that it was not her fault. They fight, but she is able to leave. Leo starts stalking Whitney, telling her he believes her about Tony and that he loves her because of their both having a connection to Tony. Whitney agrees to speak with him and he tells her he wants to continue their relationship. Whitney tells him that will never happen. He then opens a stall at the market to be close to Whitney and goes on a date with Dotty Cotton (Milly Zero), imagining that she is Whitney.

Whitney starts writing down everything that Leo does as evidence. Leo is then arrested; whilst celebrating in public, she steps out onto a balcony and sees Leo. She rushes to call the police but Leo arrives on the balcony and pushes her, causing her to drop her phone. Kush Kazemi (Davood Ghadami) arrives and seeing Leo has got hold of Whitney, saves her and accidentally pushes Leo which causes him to fall off the balcony. Leo survives and Kush gets arrested, so Whitney pretends to want to get back together with Leo so that he will drop the charges against Kush. Leo agrees to not press charges, but he finds her evidence notebook in her bag which he takes. Whitney agrees to meet with Leo and he takes her to Tony's grave where he pushes her into the ground, forcing her to apologise to Tony. He then takes her to the Queen Vic, where he forces her to announce to everyone that she has been lying about Tony abusing her and that she has made it up as a teen for attention. Everyone stands up for Whitney, knowing she is just being forced to tell them that, and Leo leaves. Whitney thinks he is gone but unbeknownst to her, he hides in her bedroom attic and is spying on her through a hole in the ceiling of her room. Leo appears in her room with a knife. Whitney tries to escape by throwing a jewellery box at him but she realises that the doors in the house are locked. She pushes him in the kitchen and he is seemingly knocked out before jumping up again and assaulting Whitney. She grabs the knife in defence and he accidentally falls on it, to his death. Whitney calls Mick for help and he tells her they are going to the boat party for an alibi. Mick washes the knife and Whitney puts it in her purse. When the boat crashes, Whitney confesses to murdering Leo and tells the police she killed someone, showing them the knife in her bag. She is later brought to the police station.

Gray Atkins (Toby-Alexander Smith) offers to represent Whitney and she is questioned by police who are doubtful as to why she would have gone to the boat party if she had killed Leo in self-defence. Whitney struggles in prison in the days leading up to her bail hearing, during which she is denied bail. She decides to go on a hunger strike and hallucinates, hearing Tony's voice, seeing herself as a child and warning herself about Tony. She then collapses and is taken to hospital, where Gray later informs her that he found evidence that Leo had been hiding in her house and spying on her for weeks. She is then given bail. Leo's mother, Michaela (Fiona Allen), confronts her and turns on Whitney, blaming her and getting people to harass her online. Whitney is kidnapped at knifepoint by Michaela and taken to a locked room. Michaela is still convinced that Whitney is to blame for Leo's death and wants her to confess. Whitney's secret phone ring and she is quickly able to cry for help as Max Branning (Jake Wood) listens on the other line. Whitney is eventually found to be not guilty.

Whitney takes time to recover from her ordeal and an unexpected kiss with Kush on Valentine's Day 2021 leads to the pair beginning a relationship. The pair quickly become engaged and have an unofficial ceremony in the square. Gray becomes jealous and when Whitney and Kush plan to leave Walford with Kush's son Arthur Fowler Jnr, he takes advantage of Whitney taking Arthur to the toilet to confront Kush. Kush discovers that Gray is a murderer and the pair have a physical fight which results in Kush being killed by an oncoming train. Whitney is left devastated by Kush's death and blames the Mitchell family, believing that they are to blame for Kush's death. On the day that Callum marries Ben, a bereaved Whitney gets into a car and tries to run over Ben and his father Phil Mitchell (Steve McFadden) but accidentally hits her friend Kat Slater (Jessie Wallace) instead who is hospitalised.

Later in the year, Whitney begins to suspect that Gray has killed his wife Chantelle Atkins (Jessica Plummer) to whom Whitney had befriended. She grows concerned for the well-being of Gray's second wife Chelsea Atkins (Zaraah Abrahams) and warns her off marrying Gray. Chelsea is pregnant with their son Jordan Atkins and fears being a single mum. She works with Kheerat Panesar and eventually finds evidence on an online forum that Chantelle has been using which proves that Gray had abused her. On Christmas Day 2021, the day of Gray and Chelsea's wedding, Whitney shows Chelsea the evidence and although Chelsea hesitates, she goes through with the wedding. A few months later, Gray is finally exposed and Chelsea sees his true colours. Whitney and Chelsea become housemates and good friends. They are later joined by Felix Baker (Matthew Morrison) and his brother Finlay Baker (Ashley Byam). Although initially attracted to Finlay, he rejects her attempt to kiss him.

Whitney has a one night stand with Zack Hudson (James Farrar) and she finds out she is pregnant on her 30th birthday. She confides in Chelsea and worries about whether Zack is the right man to be in a relationship with. When he is offered a job on a cruise ship, she hides her disappointment and is pleased when he stays. Their daughter is diagnosed with Edwards syndrome and they are told that she will not survive after birth. Zack and Whitney make the heartbreaking decision to end her pregnancy on 2 March 2023, and name their baby Peach as she was the size of a peach at the time of termination. Zack and Whitney begin a legitimate relationship in their grief, plant a tree in the allotments in Peach's memory, and later decide to become foster parents. They foster a young boy named Ashton over Christmas 2023 and struggle when he is moved away. Not long after, Whitney discovers that she is pregnant again and decides to keep this from her adoptive aunt Sonia Fowler (Natalie Cassidy) who is also trying for a baby but had not been unsuccessful. Although Sonia is hurt that Whitney hid her pregnancy from her, they soon make amends.

Whitney and Zack visit Bianca in Milton Keynes in early 2024 when she splits up from Terry Spraggan (Terry Alderton) and leaves Penny Branning (Kitty Castledine) in charge of her stall. Whilst there, she bonds with 12-year-old Britney Wainwright (Lola Campbell). Whitney sees a lot of herself in Britney and is disgusted to find her mother, Keely (Kirsty J. Curtis), is neglectful and a drug addict, that Britney has been eating from bins and has not attended school in years. Whitney angrily confronts Keeley and is hit by an oncoming car - however, Whitney and the baby are unharmed. Whitney is eager to give Britney stability and a home. Zack and Whitney argue over Britney so he leaves to go back to Walford whilst Whitney decides to foster Britney without going through the system. Instead, she pays Keeley several thousand pounds to take care of Britney herself but keeps this from Zack. She initially tells him that she fostered her legally and when he finds out, the pair have an argument in which Whitney fiercely tells him that she will always put Britney over Zack. Heartbroken, Zack sleeps with Lauren who had not long returned to Walford. Out of guilt for how she treated Zack, Whitney proposes to him in the Queen Vic and he accepts. Bianca, who is visiting her family in Walford, finds out that Zack cheated on Whitney and pressures him to tell the truth but he is unable to go through with it. On Whitney's hen night, Lauren and Whitney are locked in a van and she nearly tells Whitney herself but Whitney then goes into labour. Bianca rescues the pair and Whitney calls Bianca "mum" for the first time. Whitney gives birth to Dolly Dean-Hudson but at the hospital, Britney overhears Zack and Lauren talking about their one night stand.

Whitney's wedding day soon arrives and whilst Whitney is saying her vows, Britney reveals the truth about Zack and Lauren and a raging Whitney attacks Lauren with her bouquet. Whitney is aware that she is being gossiped about and Zack tries to win her round. She refuses to reconcile with Zack and ends her long-standing friendship with Lauren. Sonia encourages Whitney to make peace with Lauren whilst Zack's sister Sharon Watts (Letitia Dean) also tries to encourage Zack to win Whitney back to no avail. Whitney then realises that she has wasted her whole life relying on a man and plans to make a fresh start from Walford as a single mum to Britney and Dolly. One last curveball is thrown at Whitney when Zack informs her that Bianca was also aware of his infidelity - initially, Whitney had agreed to live with Bianca but the loss of trust between them results in Whitney reaffirming her desire to raise her daughters on her own. She has a heart to heart with Callum where he praises her for her strength and courage. Whitney eventually visits Lauren and tells her that she does not want a feud. And even though Lauren is genuinely sorry for what she has done, Whitney is unwilling to forgive her and laments the end of their friendship. Whitney meets up with Zack one last time, where she takes partial responsibility for the end of their relationship, surmising that their love for each other was not strong enough for either of them, but admits that she will never regret the time they had together. When Zack asks Whitney if he can see Dolly again, she promises to allow this, assuring him that he will be a great father, and allows him to say goodbye to Dolly. The residents throw a big farewell party for Whitney in the pub where there is a slide show showing photos of Whitney and her friends and family over the last sixteen years. Whitney bids a final farewell to Sonia, Stacey, Chelsea and Felix before she boards a bus with Britney and Dolly as they head to Wakefield to live with Ryan. A year later, Zack is threatened by Nicola Mitchell (Laura Doddington), who finds out where Whitney and the children live, forcing them to relocate to Inverness.

In May 2026, Whitney returns to Walford and has lunch with Zack. They enjoy catching up, until Zack suggests that she move back to Walford and give their relationship another chance. Whitney politely turns Zack down and reveals that she has a new boyfriend named Ruben, who has a son of his own and has been helping her raise Britney and Dolly. When Zack becomes upset, Whitney reminds him that they broke up two years ago and need to move on, and adds that she would like to introduce him to Ruben someday. Before Whitney leaves Walford, she meets up with Kat and tells her about her new life with Ruben, and Kat warns her not to mess things up.

== Reception ==
The BBC and television regulatory body Ofcom received upward of 90 complaints after Whitney's first scenes with Tony aired. However, they ruled that the scenes were not in breach of broadcasting rules. The Guardian's Aida Edemariam said of the beginning of the storyline: "what is most disturbing, watching [Tony and Whitney's] first scenes together, is not the sexuality of the situation per se, though that is uncomfortable – it's the subtle blackmail with which he keeps her in line. As it's combined with the emotional manipulation native to soaps, the viewer starts to feel a bit bullied, too." Numbers of viewer complaints rose within days to over 200. New Statesman journalist Jeremy Sare commented on the public outrage and defended EastEnders decision to air the storyline, writing:

"There may be some justification for the hundreds complaining about these distressing issues being presented in prime time: equally it is courageous for the Beeb to include a scenario which challenges the public's perception of what is a 'typical paedophile'. The repellent Tony's grooming and seduction of his stepdaughter, Whitney, is a much more familiar pattern of abuse than the more commonly held image of predators lurking in parks. [...] The producers of Eastenders, labouring under a welter of tabloid protest and viewers' complaints, are attempting to make people get past the initial revulsion of the act of abuse and accept the grim fact that 'paedophiles' are very often members of the same family."

Sare quoted a BBC spokeswoman as saying: "we appreciate that for some viewers this storyline will have particular resonance and significance. In running it, it's certainly not our intention to cause distress or upset, either to those who've suffered from sexual abuse or their families. Our aim is instead to raise awareness of this very sensitive issue", concluding his article with the summation: "The producers' dilemma is instructive to children's charities and Ministers alike on how to confront the issue in a digestible manner which can stimulate an objective debate."

The Daily Mirror's Beth Neil branded the plot strand "one of the darkest and most disturbing storylines EastEnders has ever attempted", with critic Jim Shelley deeming it a "new low" for EastEnders. Shelley wrote of Whitney's abuse: "You've really got to hand it to EastEnders. Just when you thought the show couldn't get any more miserable, the writers come up trumps and produce a new way of making us depressed – a paedophile storyline. Thanks for that! I realise now this is what the family meal has been missing three nights a week: gathering the telly to watch a grubby, greasyhaired thug drooling over a 15-year-old girl who (as luck would have it) spends her entire life in her school uniform even when she's not at school. And they say family entertainment's dead." Shelley refuted the BBC's claims that the storyline had educational value as "totally bogus", observing that "At 7.30 or 8pm, the "action" has to be so coded as to be pointless". Deborah Orr, writing for The Independent, similarly disagreed with the BBC's statement that the storyline was part of EastEnders' "rich heritage of tackling difficult social issues", writing that:

"Actually, it's part of its rich heritage of leaping in to some horrific subject without any background or build-up at all. The implication is that Tony, the villain, had been grooming the child for some time before he went to prison, when she was only 12. But such a thing really would be too real, and too controversial, so the viewer only gets to see the result of those hinted-at dark machinations.

"It might be a public service to dramatise the manner in which a paedophile might worm his way into a vulnerable family. But such a storyline would have to be explored carefully and over a long period. All that this little adventure in broadcasting can possibly deliver is the message that a paedophile in the heart of the home is not a good thing. Who needs to be educated about this?"

The Guardian's Julie Raeside questioned: "Is this latest sexual abuse storyline a good thing to position in a pre-watershed soap opera, or should the EastEnders storyliners stick to a less controversial brand of misery?" However, in contrast to public and media dissent, the NSPCC's director of communications, John Grounds, praised the storyline for "helping to raise awareness of the hidden nature of sexual abuse", deeming it to be "vital in persuading people to take action to stop it and encouraging children to speak out."

Episodes from Whitney's storyline were submitted to the Royal Television Society Programme Awards 2008 for a panel to judge in the category Soap and Continuing Drama. EastEnders was presented with the award in March 2009, beating Coronation Street and The Bill. Members of the judging panel described the submitted episodes as "the culmination of a particularly challenging and controversial storyline which the production team, writers and cast pulled off triumphantly." In August 2017, McGarty was longlisted for Best Actress and Sexiest Female at the Inside Soap Awards. She did not progress to the viewer-voted shortlist.

In 2020, Sara Wallis and Ian Hyland from The Daily Mirror placed Whitney 52nd on their ranked list of the best EastEnders characters of all time, calling her "Gobby" and writing that she "has been through it".

== See also ==
- List of EastEnders: E20 characters
