= Tiffany Butcher =

Fictional character from EastEnders

- EastEnders character
- Portrayed by: Maisie Smith
- Duration: 2008–2014, 2016, 2018–2022
- First appearance: Episode 3552; 1 April 2008
- Last appearance: Episode 6453; 17 March 2022
- Introduced by: Diederick Santer (2008); Sean O'Connor (2016); John Yorke (2018); Kate Oates (2022)
- Spin-off appearances: Last Tango in Walford (2010); The Queen Vic Quiz Night (2020)
In-universe information
- Other names: Tiffany Dean; Tiffany Butcher-Baker
- Occupation: Student; Drug dealer Barmaid; Makeup influencer
- Family: Beale/Jackson
- Father: Ricky Butcher
- Mother: Bianca Jackson
- Brothers: Liam Butcher
- Half-brothers: Morgan Butcher
- Half-sisters: Whitney Dean (adoptive); Kira Salter
- Husband: Keegan Baker (2019–2022)
- Grandfathers: David Wicks; Frank Butcher
- Grandmothers: Carol Jackson; June Butcher
- Uncles: Joe Wicks; Robbie Jackson; Billie Jackson
- Aunts: Sonia Fowler; Janine Butcher; Diane Butcher; Clare Butcher
- Nieces: Dolly Dean-Hudson (adoptive)
- First cousins: Bex Fowler; Sami Jackson; Scarlett Butcher; Jacques Butcher; Julia Fowler; Holly
- Other relatives: Pat Butcher; Lydia Simmonds; Norman Simmonds; Jim Branning; Derek Branning; Max Branning; Jack Branning; Bradley Branning; Lauren Branning; Abi Branning; Oscar Branning; Annie Carter; Joey Branning; Alice Branning; Simon Wicks; Ian Beale; Steven Beale; Peter Beale; Lucy Beale; Bobby Beale; Penny Branning; Amy Mitchell; Ricky Branning; James Branning

Tiffany Butcher (also Dean and Butcher-Baker) is a fictional character from the BBC soap opera EastEnders, played by Maisie Smith. Tiffany is the daughter of established characters Bianca Jackson (Patsy Palmer) and Ricky Butcher (Sid Owen), though originally she was believed to be Bianca's daughter with a man named Nathan Dean. Tiffany's surname was changed in the show's credits from Dean to Butcher, which has also been referenced in the show. Tiffany departed, alongside her half-brother Morgan Butcher (Devon Higgs) and their mother Bianca, in September 2014. Tiffany made an unannounced brief return on 3 November 2016 when she and Morgan returned to Walford for Whitney Dean (Shona McGarty) and Lee Carter's (Danny Hatchard) wedding.

In November 2017, it was announced that executive consultant John Yorke was to reintroduce the character, with Smith reprising her role as Tiffany full-time. She returned on 8 January 2018. Her storylines since her return have included her friendship with Bernadette Taylor (Clair Norris), becoming a drug dealer, being groomed by Evie Steele (Sophia Capasso) and subsequently being raped, and forming a relationship and later marriage with Keegan Baker (Zack Morris). It was announced on 8 October 2021 that Smith would once again be leaving the soap, and her final scenes aired on 14 December 2021. She returned briefly on 17 March 2022 to coincide with Keegan's departure.

== Character creation and development ==
=== Introduction ===
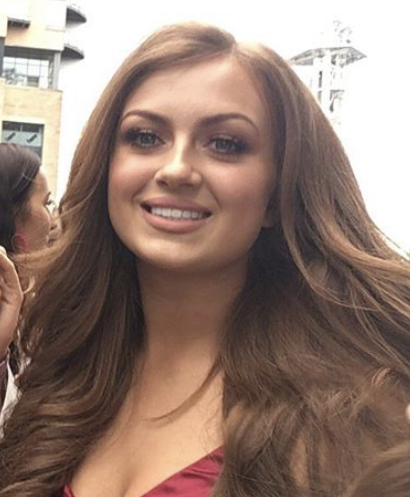
Maisie Smith portrays Tiffany Butcher.

In November 2007, it was announced that Patsy Palmer would be reprising her role as Bianca Jackson in EastEnders. A popular character who originally appeared in the serial between 1993 and 1999, Bianca was reintroduced in April 2008. Along with Bianca came four children, three of whom had not been seen in the serial before. They included Whitney Dean (Shona McGarty), the fifteen-year-old daughter of Bianca's deceased partner; Liam Butcher (James Forde), Bianca and Ricky's (Sid Owen) son who previously appeared in the serial; Tiffany Dean (Maisie Smith), Bianca's five-year-old daughter, named after her friend Tiffany Mitchell (Martine McCutcheon); and Morgan Jackson-King (Devon Higgs), Bianca's two-year-old son, "the most [spoilt] out of all of the kids".

Tiffany is described as having a "cute, butter-wouldn’t-melt exterior", which "masks her somewhat mature understanding of adult matters. She sees all, hears all and knows all, and even at five years old has blackmailed her elder sister." She is also described as "a troublesome and cheeky lass" with a "feisty, red-head personality, which she no doubt inherits from screenmum [sic] Bianca". Actress Maisie Smith, aged 6 at the time of her casting, began filming for EastEnders four days a week from January 2008 and, according to her mother, shares traits with the character she plays: "The role is an exaggeration of her own personality, she's a little madam. A lively character both on and off screen. The difference is, she's told to pronounce her t's at home!"

To promote the family's introduction, the BBC began airing trailers across the BBC network in March 2008. One trailer saw Bianca singing The Jackson 5 hit "I Want You Back" and performing a dance routine along with her four children. The promo uses the tag line "Introducing The Jackson 5". Within three days of being posted on the video sharing website YouTube, the promo had been viewed 52,000 times.

=== Departure ===
In April 2014, Palmer announced she was leaving EastEnders and in July 2014, the departure of Smith and Higgs was announced. Show bosses said that whilst they are "sad" about them leaving after six years, the decision "was right for the Butcher family as Bianca would never leave her youngest children behind." Vicky Prior from Metro commented that losing Smith was a "real shame" as she "is a star in the making and despite her young age, has proved adept at both comedy and tragedy." She also stated that Morgan "recently proved an excellent comedy partner for Tiffany" and was "looking forward to seeing these two grow in character and also as actors."

=== Temporary return and reintroduction (2016 and 2018) ===
Smith made an unannounced return in 2016 alongside Higgs, though she confirmed it was only for two episodes. Smith was uncertain if she would return on a full-time basis, but called her time there "incredible" and said that she "loved it." In November 2017, Smith's return to the serial was announced. Smith said she found it "great to be back" and "lovely" to see and meet her co-stars. Tiffany will have transformed on her return and Smith added she "can't wait to show everyone how much Tiffany has changed." A show spokesperson added that Tiffany's return "will certainly not be quiet" as Tiffany will "instantly cause trouble" for Whitney. Billed as "mischievous" on her return, Tiffany puts on a "chirpy" front, but cannot "conceal how desperate she is to stay" and her arrival puts Whitney's career opportunity "on hold" as she does best to stop Whitney moving to Wakefield. When a pregnancy test is found by Whitney, Tiffany "is about to get her way" as she is confronted by Whitney and reasons that brought her back to Walford come out.

Upon her 2018 return, Laura Morgan from Digital Spy compared Tiffany's return to Stacey Slater's (Lacey Turner) arrival in 2004 due to her "brattish behaviour." She describes Tiffany as a "young woman with a healthy appetite for misbehaviour" and a "manipulative madam" who has Bianca's "streetwise attitude", though Tiffany could get into trouble. Morgan opined Tiffany's return will provide storylines for Whitney and lead to the potential reintroduction of the Butcher family, especially Janine. Tiffany is also compared to Bianca from her golden bomber jacket that is a "little nod to the past" and with her fashion sense, it is the viewers being in 1995, "watching young Bianca in action again." Morgan later gave reasons for Tiffany to have a relationship with newcomer Hunter Owen (Charlie Winter), stating that although "cheeky Tiff thinks the handsome teen is anything but" and despite setting him up with Louise Mitchell (Tilly Keeper), she could indeed want him "for herself", though she may be "a little bit too young."

Whitney "contemplate[s]" Tiffany's future in Walford when she "takes revenge" against Louise over the way she treats Bernadette Taylor (Clair Norris) by posting a photo of Louise and Hunter in a "compromising position." Despite "already treading on rocky ground, life gets even worse" for Tiffany when she is confronted by the Ahmeds about photos posted online of her and their new foster child, Harley, who is kidnapped by his biological parents.

=== Second departure (2021) ===
On 8 October 2021, the BBC confirmed that Smith will be once again be leaving EastEnders, nearly four years after returning. Executive producer, Jon Sen, commented that everyone on the show was "very sad to see Maisie leave" and that she's been a "wonderful company member." He also went onto say that "it's been a privilege to see her blossom into the star she is," while praising her on how much of an "iconic character" she created in Tiffany and that "the door will always be open to her return". On the same day, Maisie filmed her final scenes as the official EastEnders Twitter account released a video confirming this saying, "Today was a sad day on the set of #EastEnders as we said goodbye to the amazing @maisie_smith_, who finished filming her final scene as the iconic Tiffany Butcher-Baker. But we couldn’t let her go without a small surprise and a proper Walford farewell." Her final scenes aired on 14 December 2021.

== Storylines ==
=== Backstory ===
Tiffany is the product of a one-night stand between Ricky Butcher (Sid Owen) and Bianca Jackson (Patsy Palmer), which was shown on spin-off show Ricky & Bianca, set in Manchester in 2002. Ricky and Bianca have a son together, Liam Butcher (Nathaniel Gleed) but after Ricky and Bianca had split up, Bianca began a relationship with a trucker named Nathan Dean, although she had a one night stand with Ricky and a few weeks later Bianca discovered she was pregnant but always thought Tiffany was Nathan’s daughter and never put two and two together that there was a chance Tiffany could be Ricky’s daughter until years later.

Nathan died in a road accident when Bianca was heavily pregnant and she took on the responsibility of Nathan's daughter Whitney Dean (Shona McGarty). Bianca had adopted Whitney during her relationship with Nathan as Bianca was the only mother Whitney had ever known as her biological mother walked out of her life when she was a toddler and wanted nothing to do with Whitney.

Bianca gave birth to Tiffany, whom she named after her deceased friend Tiffany Mitchell (Martine McCutcheon), and raised her as Nathan's daughter and Whitney's younger half-sister, although she still remained uncertain about Tiffany's true paternity. Tiffany grew up believing Nathan was her father.

=== 2008–2016 ===
Bianca, Whitney, Liam (now James Forde), Tiffany and her brother Morgan Jackson-King (Devon Higgs) are evicted by their landlord. After the family sleep at a bus shelter and Bianca assaults a police officer, Whitney, Liam, Tiffany and Morgan spend a week in care, but the family later moved to Walford, where they move in with Bianca's grandmother Pat Evans (Pam St Clement). Tiffany causes havoc by stealing a top from Stacey Branning’s (Lacey Turner) stall for Whitney to wear for a family party and defacing the pavement outside Zainab Masood’s (Nina Wadia) house before ruining her primroses by pouring soapy water over them. As a result, Tiffany unwittingly instigates feuds between Bianca, Stacey and Zainab. However, she takes to Bianca's cousins Bradley (Charlie Clements) and Abi Branning (Lorna Fitzgerald), sharing a common interest in animals.

Tiffany's love of animals leads to Whitney begging Vinnie Monks (Bobby Davro) to give them Wellard, formerly the family dog that had been sold to Vinnie after his previous owner Gus Smith (Mohammed George) left Walford. Vinnie gives Tiffany Wellard, on the condition that Whitney and Liam wash his car every day until he says otherwise. However, tragedy strikes when Wellard has to die Tiffany is devastated, and after overhearing a phone conversation, she is convinced that Bianca’s uncle Ian Beale (Adam Woodyatt) is behind Wellard’s demise. However, a post-mortem leads to the discovery that Bianca was responsible for Wellard's death because she gave him chocolate. Tiffany eventually forgives Bianca after she convinces Pat to give them her dog Terrence. However, Tiffany is once again left devastated when her aunt Janine Butcher (Charlie Brooks) spitefully reclaims Terrence, who was originally her dog.

Tiffany takes to Ricky, who is also living at Pat's house. Ricky grows fond of Tiffany and, on seeing how close they are becoming, Bianca tries to write Ricky a letter explaining that he could be Tiffany's father, which gets stuck to a picture that Tiffany has drawn to give to Ricky. When Ricky reads the letter he asks for a DNA test and a week later they discover that Tiffany is his daughter. They decide not to tell the family so as not to upset Whitney, who now has no biological family left.

After Tiffany is left in Janine’s care, Janine ropes her into one of her schemes when a rich single father wants to buy her sports car. Janine pretends that Tiffany is her daughter and arranges a play-date, only for Bianca to see Tiffany get into the car alone with the stranger. Ricky is furious with Janine and when she questions his loyalty towards Bianca and her children, he tells her the truth. Janine is sworn to secrecy, and begins to bond with her niece. Janine enters Tiffany in a children's talent contest, telling her to think of Wellard her family pets death to make herself cry and gain sympathy from the judges. Tiffany hears Ricky singing The Prodigy’s "Firestarter" and he teaches her the song, which she performs in the contests, which she goes on to win.

Tiffany is bullied by Ian’s son Bobby Beale (Alex Francis). Whitney advises her to bully him back, but this only makes things worse. Whitney shouts at Ricky and Bianca for not protecting her and tells Ricky that Tiffany is her sister. This makes Ricky angry and he is fed up of lying about Tiffany's true paternity. He tells Bianca that once her ex-boyfriend Tony King’s (Chris Coghill) trial is over, he will come clean about Tiffany's paternity. When Tiffany breaks Whitney's phone and shouts at her, Ricky and Whitney get into an argument. Whitney tells Ricky to leave her and Tiffany alone as she is nothing to do with him, but he reveals that Tiffany is his daughter. Whitney begins to ignore Tiffany so Bianca and Ricky tell her the truth and she is happy. After Whitney gives evidence at Tony's trial, she says she is still Whitney's sister and they hug. On Christmas Eve, Tiffany reads out a letter to Santa, wishing him to bring happiness to Whitney. Bianca later sees the letter, seeing that Tiffany wishes Ricky and Bianca to get married. Ricky and Bianca get engaged to Tiffany's delight. When Ricky and Bianca get married, they decide to change Tiffany’s name from Dean to Butcher, which makes Tiffany extremely happy. This upsets Whitney but she soon gets over it after seeing how happy Tiffany is.

When Dotty Cotton (Molly Conlin) has a birthday party, Tiffany refuses to go, asking Ricky to lie for her. The next day, Tiffany tells Dotty she is not invited to her birthday party, but Bianca later invites her. On Tiffany's birthday, she stays at home without Ricky and Bianca knowing with Dotty. After an argument, Dotty runs off with Tiffany's bridesmaid's dress and throws her MP3 player into a bin. When Tiffany cannot reach to get it out, Dotty pushes her in and flees. Tiffany's uncle Billie Jackson (Devon Anderson) saves her from being crushed by the dustbin lorry. The day before Ricky and Bianca's wedding, Bianca's mother Carol Jackson (Lindsey Coulson) arrives looking for Billie. Carol and Bianca do not get on so Carol decides not to stay, even though Liam and Tiffany want her to.

Tiffany's uncle Robbie Jackson (Dean Gaffney) also attends the wedding and looks forward to seeing Wellard but is unaware that Wellard is dead until Tiffany tells him. After the wedding Carol and Bianca make up and Carol later moves in. Tiffany is very upset when Billie dies. In December 2010, Bianca explains that they cannot afford a lot for Christmas. Liam and Tiffany see Bianca using money-making schemes in the café, so they steal perfume from the market, ultimately leading to Bianca being arrested for assaulting a police officer. When Tiffany drops off a card she made for Carol, she sees her kissing Connor Stanley (Arinze Kene) through the letterbox. The next day she acts strangely and crosses Carol out of a family photograph with a pen. Bianca worries about her behaviour, so gets Liam to ask her what is wrong. Tiffany tells Liam of what she saw. Although she wants to tell Bianca, Liam says not to tell anyone as it may cause an argument and they may end up in care homes. However, Tiffany witnesses Carol and Connor embracing and has trouble controlling herself, finally snapping at Carol and calling her a bad person for doing things with "Whitney's boyfriend", prompting Carol to try and persuade her to keep her quiet. Tiffany gets into a fight at school and tells her teacher that she saw Carol die under a bus. She is suspended for two days. She refuses to speak to Bianca, and Bianca suspects she is being abused. Carol is then forced to reveal the truth and Bianca realises Carol was silencing Tiffany. The events lead to Bianca attacking Connor and going to prison.

When Whitney disappears, Tiffany helps to find her as she has kept a diary of everything she hears. Whitney is then found and comes back home. Liam, Tiffany and Morgan are left devastated when Ricky leaves for a job in Dubai. Tiffany and her friends tease Janine when she is forced to clean Ian’s chip shop floor on her hands and knees. Janine buys presents for Liam and Morgan and upsets Tiffany by leaving her out because of the incident in the chip shop. Tiffany is devastated when Ricky leaves again for six months in Dubai. When Janine later buys her some presents, Tiffany rejects them. Tiffany makes friends with Shenice Quinn (Lily Harvey) and is delighted when Shenice is enrolled at her school.

Tiffany is excited when Bianca is due to be released from prison in time for her Christmas concert. However, Ricky receives news that there is a delay and that Bianca will not be out in time. Tiffany is upset and does not put much effort into her performance, until Bianca appears halfway through, and Tiffany is overjoyed. She is then devastated when Pat dies, and when Ricky leaves again. Bianca is soon forced to reveal that she and Ricky have split up and he will not be returning. She then worries that Morgan's father Ray Dixon (Chucky Venn) will get into a relationship with Bianca after seeing them hugging, as she does not want any more changes, and Bianca has to explain there is nothing between them. Realising that Bianca is having some difficulties with her money, Tiffany and Morgan go to see Dot Branning (June Brown) at the laundrette. She tells them that when she had problems as a child, she felt better after being given a bath. Tiffany and Morgan then decide to run a bath for Bianca but accidentally leave the taps on when they go out. When they get home, the bath has overflowed and is leaking into the living room. They also find a kitten, which Bianca’s uncle Derek Branning (Jamie Foreman) helps to look after, and he encourages them to keep it a secret from the rest of the family and names it Joey. Bianca is later caught stealing money and returns to prison, but this time located in Suffolk.

Tiffany then moves to Suffolk with the rest of her family to be near Bianca. She returns for Janine's wedding to Michael Moon (Steve John Shepherd), along with Ricky, Morgan and her aunt Diane Butcher (Sophie Lawrence). She then moves back to Walford with her family for when Bianca is released from prison.

Tiffany and Bobby (now Rory Stroud) begin a relationship and get each other walkie talkies. When Bianca trashes Ian's new restaurant, Ian agrees not to go to the police in exchange for Tiffany and Bobby not seeing each other any more. Tiffany is upset when Bobby does not call her on the walkie talkie. Tiffany and Bobby then start meeting in secret. However, she is not pleased when Bianca returns from a trip to Manchester announces that her new boyfriend Terry Spraggan (Terry Alderton) and his children, TJ (George Sargeant) and Rosie Spraggan (Jerzey Swingler), are moving in. Tiffany and Morgan are later upset when they discover that Carol has breast cancer, though she makes a full recovery. Tiffany's last day of primary school was ruined when she accidentally brought brownies containing drugs into school. Bianca agrees to move to Milton Keynes with Terry, TJ, Rosie and TJ’s daughter Beth, taking Tiffany and Morgan with her and Liam decides to move to Milton Keynes with Ricky and his girlfriend Cindy Williams (Mimi Keene) - who is Beth’s mother.

Tiffany and Morgan return for Whitney's wedding to Lee Carter (Danny Hatchard) and she tries on her bridesmaid dress. Tiffany acts as bridesmaid with Whitney's niece, Lily Slater (Aine Garvey). She and Morgan leave again shortly after the reception.

=== 2018–2022 ===
Tiffany returns to Walford, visiting Whitney, who is planning to move to Wakefield. Whitney postpones her plans and Tiffany manipulates her into letting her stay by lying that Bianca has attempted suicide and faking panic attacks. Whitney cancels her plans when Tiffany is almost hit by a car. TJ visits and reveals Tiffany's lies about Bianca, so Tiffany runs off to meet some older boys to whom she has lied about her age. They smoke drugs and talk about having sex with her, then lock her in their car but she manages to escape and is rescued by her family. Tiffany is allowed to stay when she explains that TJ had sex with random girls when he was supposed to be caring for her in Bianca and Terry's absence. Tiffany then sets Whitney up on a date with Callum "Halfway" Highway (Tony Clay) and befriends Bernadette Taylor (Clair Norris). To get revenge on Louise Mitchell (Tilly Keeper) for being horrible to Bernadette, she posts a photo of Louise and her boyfriend Hunter Owen (Charlie Winter) in a compromising position, which leads a public argument between Tiffany, Louise and their families. Tiffany overhears Whitney discussing sending her back to Milton Keynes. Tiffany decides to return to Milton Keynes when Masood Ahmed (Nitin Ganatra) confronts her over a selfie of her and his family's foster son, Harley, which leads to his kidnap by his birth parents, but Whitney is persuaded to allow Tiffany to remain by Bernadette and Harley's foster father, Arshad Ahmed (Madhav Sharma), who is Masood’s uncle.

After Shakil Kazemi (Shaheen Jafargholi) dies from being stabbed, Tiffany, Louise, Hunter, Bernadette, Tiffany’s cousin Bex Fowler (Jasmine Armfield) and Bernadette’s brother Keegan Baker (Zack Morris) spend time at E20 and during spin the bottle, Tiffany kisses both Keegan and Bernadette, which leads Bernadette to confusion about her feelings, though Tiffany tells Bernadette she likes Keegan. Despite avoidance from Bernadette, Tiffany understands how Bernadette feels. Tiffany starts a relationship with Jagger Rawley (Aaron Thomas Ward), who uses her to deliver drugs. Tiffany discovers that Jagger has given drugs to Keegan so she bins them; Jagger asks her to pay for them but she is unable to. Tiffany then meets Evie Steele (Sophia Capasso), who stands up for her in front of Jagger. However, Tiffany discovers that Evie is part of the gang. She allows them to use Ted Murray’s (Christopher Timothy) flat after she steals his keys and Tiffany is shocked to discover Evie is the leader of the gang. Evie asks Tiffany to deliver a package to Suffolk and tells her she must take Bernadette with her. Tiffany tells Bernadette what is going on and Bernadette agrees to go with her when Tiffany kisses her. In Suffolk, Tiffany successfully receives the package of drugs in a crack-den. She deals drugs to Keegan once again and when Bernadette finds out she falls out with her, however, Tiffany invites her to the Queen Vic with her and Evie and they make up. Tiffany and Evie then kiss in the toilets witnessed by Bernadette. Tiffany remains in the gang, grooming Dennis Rickman Jnr (Bleu Landau) much to his mother Sharon Mitchell’s (Letitia Dean) fury. Tiffany’s family and friends stage an intervention and she leaves the drugs in the past. However, before she can, she is raped by one of the gang members and confides in her great-uncle Jack Branning (Scott Maslen) who is a policeman. Tiffany and Keegan later begin a relationship and when attempting to sleep together for the first time, she admits that she was raped. Keegan does not take the news well but they reconcile and elope to Gretna Green, with Tiffany getting married at 16.

In the events leading up to her departure, Tiffany discovered that Keegan cheated on her with Dotty (now Milly Zero) leading to their split. A month later, the two try to become friends again, but aren't successful. Later that day, Liam (now Alfie Deegan) returns and takes an instant dislike to Keegan. Although Liam pretends that he came back for Tiffany, he actually needs to find money. When Keegan becomes suspicious of the reasoning behind Liam's return, he tries to warn Tiffany multiple times, although she refuses to listen to him. Liam even tries to convince Tiffany to divorce Keegan and take her half of their business earnings, not revealing that this true intentions are to steal the money from her, but she doesn't go through with this. Tiffany starts a relationship with Aaron Monroe (Charlie Wernham), although he is later revealed to be far-right, with Tiffany unaware of this. Despite several warnings from Dotty and Keegan over Aaron's behaviour, she continues her relationship with him and assumes they are jealous of her. Liam is in favour of Tiffany's relationship with Aaron and uses it to push her and Keegan further apart. When Tiffany sees Keegan out on a date with another girl, she realises that she still loves him, but when she tries to tell him, Keegan serves her with divorce papers, stating that he needs to move on. Tiffany is angry and upset by this and turns back to her relationship with Aaron. After Lola Pearce (Danielle Harold) tells her that the school nativity was cancelled due to the impact of the COVID-19 pandemic on education, Tiffany signs a petition for it to still take place, although, Aaron manipulates her into believing that the real reason that the nativity was cancelled was due to 'snowflakes' trying to cancel Christmas traditions and the holiday altogether and convinces her to post pictures of herself with English flags on her face and petitions on social media due to her high following. Tiffany's posts online attract a crowd to the pub along with some of Aaron's friends and a confrontation eventually breaks out between them and Keegan, Lola, her boyfriend Isaac Baptiste (Stevie Basaula) and Mick Carter (Danny Dyer). Despite the crowd being thrown out, Aaron instructs his friends to attack Keegan as he walks home, leaving him in hospital with a collapsed lung. The next day, Tiffany discovers that Keegan was attacked but is still unaware that Aaron was behind it. Tiffany is overwhelmed with guilt and after a conversation with Keegan’s father Mitch Baker (Roger Griffiths), she visits an unconscious Keegan in hospital and confesses her love to him, but is interrupted by his mother Karen Taylor (Lorraine Stanley), who tells her to stay out of Keegan's life forever. This leads Tiffany to make the decision of continuing her relationship with Aaron and signing the divorce papers that Keegan gave her. Tiffany's new make-up business fails when Liam, Janine, Billy Mitchell (Perry Fenwick) and Jay Brown (Jamie Borthwick) steal cars from her customers and she is accused of being responsible. Tiffany is upset when she discovers that Liam is moving back to Germany and lashes out at Keegan. Later that day, she ends her relationship with Aaron after he becomes aggressive with her for trying to answer his phone. After this, Tiffany decides she wants to leave Walford and move to Germany with Liam. Tiffany later receives a visit from Keegan as he gives her £300 and they end up sleeping together. The next day, Tiffany and Keegan realise that they still love each other, but doubt the other feels the same. Whitney convinces Tiffany to write a letter to Keegan over how she feels about him and this conversation is overheard by Liam. In the letter, Tiffany instructs Keegan to meet her at the tube if he wants to continue their marriage and also puts their divorce papers inside, saying that if he doesn't turn up, he can sign the divorce papers and she will leave for Germany. Tiffany gives the letter to Keegan before heading to the tube, but Liam had removed the letter from the envelope, leaving only the divorce papers and Tiffany's half of their jigsaw necklace inside. Keegan is devastated to discover what's inside the letter and theretofore, doesn't turn up at the tube to meet Tiffany. This leads Tiffany to assume that Keegan no longer loves her and she leaves Walford feeling devastated with Liam, without knowing what he has done.

Three months later in March 2022, Keegan is devastated to learn that his sister Chantelle Atkins (Jessica Plummer) was murdered by her husband Gray Atkins (Toby-Alexander Smith) after enduring years of domestic abuse from him. In a rage, he burns down his business van, which Gray paid for. Seeing Keegan's distress, Whitney asks Tiffany to come back to Walford. She returns and makes a statement to the police which prevents Keegan from being arrested for arson. Keegan reveals to Tiffany that he never received her letter. Realising he never stopped loving her, Tiffany kisses Keegan. Keegan concludes that there is nothing left for him in Walford and he and Tiffany leave Walford and return to Germany.

== Reception ==
Digital Spy's Kris Green has said Maisie Smith is "brilliant" and "one...to watch", comparing her to Ellis Hollins, the award-winning child actor who plays Tom Cunningham in the Channel 4 teen soap opera Hollyoaks. She has also been praised by stage school teacher Sandra Singer, who said: "Maisie has the most incredible memory and when it comes to script work she is fantastic. It is often very difficult for a six-year-old to act, but she handles it really well and adores it." In May 2009 Smith won 'Best Dramatic Performance from a young actor or actress' at the British Soap Awards. She was nominated again in 2011 for 'Best Young Performance'. Smith was nominated again in 2018 for 'Best Young Actor', but lost out to Isobel Steele who plays Liv Flaherty in Emmerdale.
