= Molly Conlin =

English actress (born 2001)

- Born: 23 February 2001 (age 25); Canning Town, London, England
- Occupation: Actress
- Years active: 2001–2013
- Known for: EastEnders (2008–2010)

Molly Conlin (born 23 February 2001) is an English former actress, known for her role as Dotty Cotton on the BBC soap opera EastEnders.

== Early life ==
Conlin was born in Canning Town, London where she lives with her mother and her brother, Jack. In 2008 Conlin signed up at the Sylvia Young agency, Marylebone.

== Career ==
=== EastEnders ===
In 2008, Nick Cotton (John Altman) returned to EastEnders. joined by Conlin, in the role of Dotty Cotton. Conlin was seven at the time. Speaking of her casting, Conlin said, "I'm really excited about it because I have always wanted to be in EastEnders." Conlin was considered too old for the part of Tiffany Dean which she previously auditioned for but she succeeded in impressing the producers, who offered her the role of Dotty instead. The part of Tiffany went to Maisie Smith. Originally eleven years old, they changed Dotty's age to seven to accommodate Conlin's casting. Introduced as a guest character by Santer, she made her first appearance on 26 December 2008. She started to appear more frequently, becoming a recurring character, until Dotty later left on 23 February 2010.

== Filmography ==
Year	Title	Role	Notes
2004	Little Miss Jocelyn	Unnamed	1 episode
2007	The Omid Djalili Show	Girl in hospital	1 episode
2008	Thank God You're Here	Unnamed	1 episode
2008–2010	EastEnders	Dotty Cotton	Recurring role; 49 episodes
2011	Annabel's Kitchen	Herself	1 episode
2013	Horrible Histories	Little Girl in Mellified Man Advert and Little Girl Spartan Girl Doll advert	2 episodes
2013	Blandings	Gladys	1 episode

=== Advertisements ===
- Ragu pasta sauce
- Heinz beans
- Bold 2 in 1
