= Tom "Rocky" Cotton =

Fictional character from EastEnders

- EastEnders character
- Portrayed by: Brian Conley
- Duration: 2021–2023, 2025
- First appearance: Episode 6274; 18 May 2021
- Last appearance: Episode 7104; 17 April 2025
- Introduced by: Jon Sen (2021); Chris Clenshaw (2025)
- Crossover appearances: Emmerdale (2021)
In-universe information
- Other names: Terry Cant; Thomas Cotton; Rocky Cotton
- Occupation: Car salesman
- Father: Charlie Cotton
- Half-brothers: Nick Cotton; Andrew Cotton
- Wife: Jo Cotton; Kathy Beale (2023, void)
- Stepsons: Ian Beale; Ben Mitchell
- Nephews: Charlie Cotton; Ashley Cotton
- Nieces: Dotty Cotton

Tom "Rocky" Cotton is a fictional character from the BBC soap opera EastEnders, played by Brian Conley. He was introduced under the alias Terry Cant, the estranged father of Sonia Fowler (Natalie Cassidy) in episode 6274, broadcast on 18 May 2021, after his casting details were announced in February of that year. He was initially billed as the "ultimate people pleaser" and a charmer. In his time on the show, his storylines focused on the exposure of his false identity, his relationship and eventual marriage to Kathy Beale (Gillian Taylforth), burning down the Bridge Street Café in an insurance scam, and being one of the potential victims in "The Six" storyline. In September 2023, it was announced that Conley had left the soap, with his last appearance being depicted in episode 6830, which aired on 29 December 2023. On 17 April 2025, Conley made an unannounced return to tie in with Sonia's departure.

== Development ==
=== Introduction ===
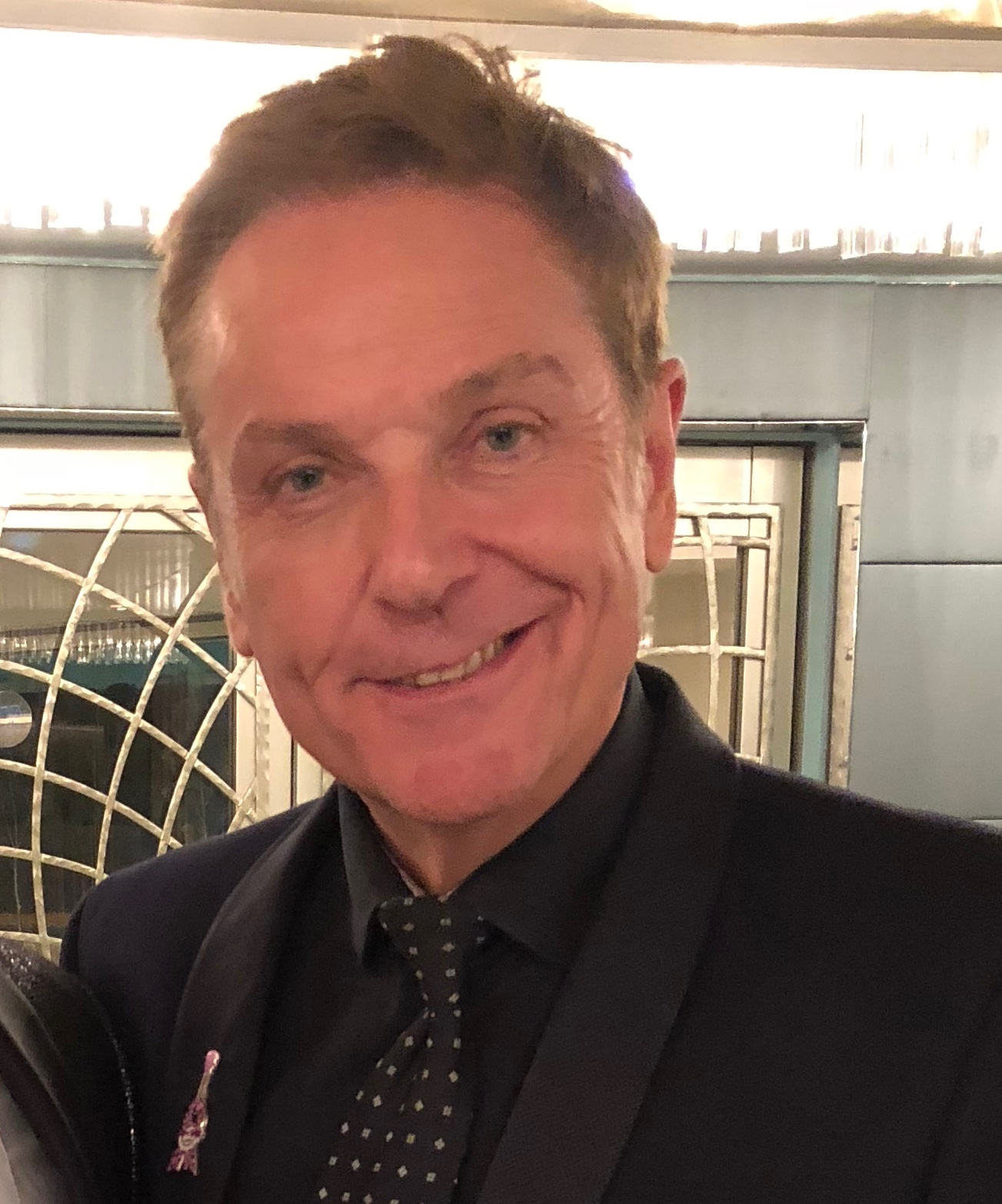
Actor and comedian Brian Conley (pictured in 2018) portrayed Tom "Rocky" Cotton.

Rocky was introduced as Terry Cant, the estranged father of established character Sonia Fowler (Natalie Cassidy), with Conley's casting being announced on 15 February 2021. Rocky made his first appearance on 18 May 2021. Conley's contract was a long term one as a "series regular". Conley teased the reason for Terry's arrival as "he wants to find Sonia and [viewers] need to find out why". The character also entered with a hidden backstory, but "needs to try to convince Sonia that he is a good man and initially you are skeptical". Terry is billed the "ultimate people pleaser", who would be "quick to charm everyone on the Square and make himself at home" and "dip into everyone's lives". Conley also explained that Terry had a more humorous side, saying "He's cheeky, his name's Rocky and my wife and kids roared at that", and hoped viewers would find the character funny. Conley said he found himself relating to Terry on some occasions, saying "I'm a cheeky cockney lad, and Terry is too", adding that "He's got the gift of the gab". On his casting, Conley said "As you can imagine being a Londoner and now being part of EastEnders is such an incredible moment for me. I know for sure my dad's looking down from above and saying 'Good on yer son'", adding that he felt it was an "honour" to be cast on the show. He also described joining EastEnders as an "incredible moment", joking that he could not wait to order his first pint at The Queen Vic. When conflict arises, the character prefers to "defuse things with comedy".

Executive producer Jon Sen and his team wrote Rocky especially for Conley. The actor said that he received a call from EastEnders producers who said "they have this character and they want me in it". The actor was happy to not have to go through an audition process as he is "rubbish" at them. Sen said that despite Rocky being somewhat difficult to cast, Conley was the perfect person to play the character, saying "the moment we met Brian, we knew instantly we had found our man", calling the actor "a talented performer whose charm, wit and charisma are exactly the qualities we want for Terry". Conley explained in an interview with Inside Soap that EastEnders bosses had searched for an actor to play Terry for a while and that he was informed of his casting before Christmas 2020. Conley admitted that he "had to work on [his character's] accent" at first. The actor added that since he is also a comedian, he hoped his character could "lighten things up" around Walford. Sen teased storylines for the character, saying "We've got some wonderful stories in store for him and can't wait for the audience to see Brian bring him to life". Sen believed Conley's charm and charisma not only won him the role, but it also helped to "throw viewers off the scent" of the character's more villainous nature.

=== Relationship with Kathy Beale ===
After Rocky began a relationship with Kathy Beale (Gillian Taylforth). Conley said Rocky was "madly in love with Kathy" as she is "a true gem" and he "doesn't want to hurt her". Conley said Rocky loved Kathy "from the very first moment he met her". Conley confirmed "He’s in love with her, but he’s been lying for so long and he just doesn’t know how to cope with it". Taylforth said that Rocky gave her a second chance at love, saying "after Gavin [Sullivan, Kathy's ex-husband], Kathy didn’t think she’d have another chance at love again and then along came Rocky, who through want of trying, taught her to love again". But she added that while "Kathy would love nothing more than to be happily married to Rocky", she was incapable of living with the "constant lies" as Rocky would often be dishonest with her.

On 24 February 2023, executive producer Chris Clenshaw appeared on Loose Women to announce that Rocky's secret wife of over 25 years Jo Cotton (Vicki Michelle) would join the show for a stint, in a storyline surrounding Rocky's bigamy. After Rocky proposed to Kathy, despite it being intended as a joke and still having a wife, Conley said of the proposal: "Rocky's got a lot of things wrong recently, not huge things, but he wants to apologise to Kathy. The trouble is that Kathy gets the wrong end of the stick during his apology and thinks he’s proposing". Despite this, the actor added that he was "glad" that Rocky had managed to gain the courage to pop the question, even if it was accidental, teasing that "if I know Rocky, it’s going to be a bumpy ride".

Jo went on to make her first appearance on 29 March 2023. Upon seeing her for the first time, Conley said Rocky is "devastated" as he spots her on Kathy's doorstep and that "once he sees Jo arrive, he knows that's it". Speaking on Jo's storylines, Conley said, "Rocky has tried to bury his past, like he does with so many things. I think he hoped deep down that [Jo and the marriage] would just go away". Conley added that Rocky "knows that eventually, unless he can get the situation sorted quietly behind Kathy’s back, he is going to have to say something". He added that he hoped that the relationship would survive as "Rocky is so in love with Kathy, and will do anything for her. I think over the last year, Kathy has realised how much he loves her, and I just hope that prevails". When asked about how their wedding would look, Conley said "I think it would be classy, because Kathy is. It will be glamorous, but not too glamorous". The carriage featured in the wedding, which was over 100 years old, was the same one used for the wedding between Frank Butcher (Mike Reid) and Pat Wicks (Pam St Clement). On the wedding day, Conley teased that Rocky would be "especially nervous" due to the issues he's had with Jo, as he knew that, based on her personality, "something [bad] could happen". As revenge for leaving her for over 25 years, Jo crashes the wedding by revealing that Rocky was still married to her, a reveal which was said to cause "huge ramifications" for the couple's future.

=== Identity reveal ===
In September 2021, it was revealed that Rocky was not Terry Cant and was, in fact, Thomas Cotton, done in an elaborate scheme that his niece Dotty Cotton (Milly Zero) had cooked up to con Sonia of her inheritance. Conley explained the plot as "[Rocky has been] pretending to be Sonia’s dad because he has been brought in by Dotty, who has given him all the back story to be able to convince Sonia that he is her father, to fleece her of the money from Dot". The plot was a reason why the nickname Rocky was introduced for the character as it prevented confusion. Conley was aware from his introduction of his character's true identity, noting that "the hardest thing was keeping [the twist] a secret", and was excited for the show to tackle Rocky's real personality, saying "It's a relief that it's come out, I want them all to know who he really is, and how the story will unfold".

"Well I was very aware when I started. I was fortunate enough to have it mapped out, we didn't know his name or things like that, but it was one of the reasons that they always called me Rocky because he's meant to be Terry but he's actually Thomas, and that could get confusing. Because of that, they decided on Rocky – much to my amusement, as I couldn’t be further from Rocky! For me, the hardest thing was keeping it a secret. Friends would go, 'Oh I love the fact that you're a father.'"

— Brian Conley, portrayer of Rocky, discussing the twist that he was not Sonia's father.

Conley revealed that he enjoyed playing Rocky's darker side as it was further from his public persona. He said "It’s a lot easier being dark. If you come into a room being happy and fun and doing quips, you’ve got to get a feel of the place and have your comedic timing. If you come in evil, you haven’t got to do anything; just come in, deep voice, 'Shaaaat up!' It’s a lot easier to act that than being funny". He also said "It's much harder to be jolly and bubbly and funny than it is to walk in with a big frown, start shouting, and be all tough". He believed that the character began to feel more strongly about living in Walford following the reveal and no longer wanted to leave it, and was excited for viewers to see that side of his character, saying "as the weeks and months have gone on he very much realises now that this is his home". The actor revealed that Rocky is not as wicked as Dotty or her deceased father Nick Cotton (John Altman), as he was being manipulated by Dotty, describing Rocky's true self as being a "wheeler-dealer" who has never resorted to violence, adding that he thinks "he's a cheeky ducking diving, bobbing, weaving – the cocky cockney Rocky". The actor called it an "honour" to play a central role in the storyline, adding that "Rocky [deserved] his punishment".

After Rocky experiences a heart attack after it was exposed, the actor said "The anxiety was all-consuming on his health". Talking about the cause of the heart attack, Conley said "I think he’s backed in this corner and for his own health he can't even think about it. One day at a time, try and get through this bit then that bit… if he sat down and realised the implications of how everything was going to pan out and asked: 'how are you going to get out of it?'". He added that "it’s obvious that he does care [...] a lot. Once it comes to a head, you will realise how much he cares and how much he realises what a terrible thing he has done".

=== Arson plot ===
It was announced on 9 November 2023 that Rocky would set fire to the Bridge Street café in an insurance scam to pay off a debt he owed to Nish Panesar (Navin Chowdhry). When filming stunts for the scenes, Conley claimed that he "felt like Tom Cruise", adding that filming the scenes was "scary" as he "could not see anything". Teasing consequences for the fire, the actor believed that the fire would mark the end of his marriage with Kathy, he said: "I'd dump him. I mean, how much can Kathy put up with? The poor woman has really gone through it with him". He added that forgiveness would be possible as the characters' "love has kept them together, Rocky genuinely absolutely loves her, which is wonderful."

It was said that the couple would face "devastation" when Kathy discovered the truth. Conley said that the reveal would cause friction between the two, saying "Kathy obviously has put up with a hell of a lot [laughs] since the wedding". The actor commented that Rocky would remain optimistic and jolly as usual, but that "he knows in his heart that it will be asking a hell of a lot from her to forgive him". The actor also said that although "Kathy might have the heart to forgive him" as Rocky had noble intentions, disclosed that Rocky "would have to do a hell of a lot to win back her trust" and that Rocky would be "devastated that he's bought this all on himself".

=== The Six and departure ===
On 12 September 2023, it was announced that Conley had decided to leave the show, a decision that was reportedly made "some time" before the announcement. The actor shut down speculation that there had been an argument with bosses and stated that he made the decision for multiple reasons, but made clear that he had loved his time with the soap over the past three years. Speaking of the rumours, the actor said "I made it for many reasons", and acknowledged the rumours by saying "there's [...] reports saying that I 'clashed' with TV bosses and the crew. I didn't 'clash' with anyone [or] have a rant". He made clear that he enjoyed his time on the soap, saying "In front of the cameras and behind the cameras, I've loved my three years there. So that's the truth in the reports". The actor later opened up about leaving due to a lack of creative liberties and the aggressive filming schedules, saying "it was my choice to leave, because you are very restricted in the show as you can't really do anything else and I wanted a break from that" he explained, adding that "three years was long enough for me".

Despite enjoying his time there, the actor was "excited" about filming Rocky's exit, teasing that "it's good". Conley teased Rocky's exit as being "only a matter of time before the house of cards comes tumbling down". Leading up to the departure, Gillian Taylforth teased "upsetting" scenes to come for the two, adding that "[Kathy] still does love him. And there's that awful thing, that love and hate thing, and she loves him but she hates what he's done. But deep down she still really loves him".

Following a flash-forward sequence in February 2023, showing a seemingly dead body on the floor of The Queen Victoria at Christmas, Rocky was one of the most suspected characters for the body. The storyline became known as "The Six", referring to the six female characters: Kathy, Sharon Watts (Letitia Dean), Linda Carter (Kellie Bright), Denise Fox (Diane Parish), Stacey Slater (Lacey Turner), and Suki Panesar (Balvinder Sopal), who were suspected to be the murderer. "The Seven" was a list of seven male potential victims: Rocky, Nish, Phil Mitchell (Steve McFadden), Keanu Taylor (Danny Walters), Dean Wicks (Matt Di Angelo), Jack Branning (Scott Maslen), and Ravi Gulati (Aaron Thiara), was announced on 7 December 2023. The cast were kept in the dark about who the body was. Rocky's inclusion was justified due to setting fire to Kathy's café, endangering her grandsons. Taylforth said that "Rocky is firmly in Kathy’s bad books" due to setting fire to her café, putting two of her grandsons in hospital, and then having "the brass nerve to convince her to sell the café to Nish so that he could get away scot-free with his crimes". She concluded by saying that "Kathy has forgiven him time and time again, but this time it’s one time too many". A Radio Times poll revealed that fans believed Rocky was the 5th most likely of "the seven" to be killed, with 7% fans believing he was going to die.

It was revealed on Christmas Day that Rocky was not the body, but was drunk and witnessed suspicious behaviour from The Six, causing Kathy to turn him in to authorities for his arson plot to keep him quiet. On his departure, Conley said that appearing on the soap "was nerve-wracking at first because the show is so iconic" but he looks back on his time on Albert Square with "very fond memories". Despite leaving, Conley didn't rule out the prospect of a future return to the show, saying "I am in prison so I haven't died and that's a nice thought", Conley said. "I could get off with good behaviour". Conley shared an Instagram post bidding farewell to the character the day following the airing of his final scenes which read "Well Rocky, you pretended to be Sonia's Dad, Had two heart attacks, Married Kathy Beale, Met the King of England, Your best mate's with Harry Redknapp, You blew up the café, and had a pet parrot called Jasper, Gonna miss you, you old rascal".

== Storylines ==
Rocky arrives in Walford and instantly bumps into Rainie Highway (Tanya Franks) after leaving the tube station. He asks her for directions to Albert Square and arrives at the local club, where he charms punters with stories. Sonia Fowler (Natalie Cassidy) walks into the club and argues with Dotty Cotton (Milly Zero) and comes face with Rocky but is unaware of who he is and leaves after labelling him a "pervert". Rocky then arrives at the Queen Victoria public house looking for Sonia, who hides from him but he finds her and introduces himself as her father, confirming that he received a letter that she had sent to him. After Sonia tells Rocky that her mother, Carol Jackson (Lindsey Coulson) told her that he had walked out on them, Rocky tells Sonia that he loved Carol and they would have remained together if it had not been for Carol's next partner Alan Jackson (Howard Antony). He asks Sonia to have a drink with him, which she agrees to, and recognises Carol's brother, Jack Branning (Scott Maslen). Rocky tries to build bridges, but Sonia is unwilling to.

He later marries Kathy Beale (Gillian Taylforth), to whom unbeknownst to Kathy he has a previous wife he married in 1997. Jo Cotton (Vicki Michelle) arrives at the square and reveals to Rocky she still has "Jasper", who is later revealed to be a parrot after much speculation Rocky had a secret son. She later arrives on their wedding day and tells Rocky she wants money for her silence. Kathy later finds out what had happened and orders Jo to leave. Jo later then blackmails them both for £50,000 to keep quiet about Rocky's bigamy and they later both rack up the money before Jo leaves the square.

In October 2023, it is revealed that Rocky has a gambling addiction. He is falling into more debt and later falls into the bad hands of Nish Panesar (Navin Chowdhry) after he falls into debt with him. Nish continues to blackmail Rocky, to which Harvey Monroe (Ross Boatman) finds out and tries to help Rocky through his debt – to which Rocky then burns down Kathy's café in an insurance scam attempt to receive the money to satisfy Nish's demands. Kathy is horrified when she finds out about the scam, especially since her grandsons, Peter (Thomas Law) and Bobby Beale (Clay Milner Russell), were seriously injured in the fire. As a result, she leaves him.

Two months later, Rocky grows suspicious of Kathy as she does not allow him into the burnt café and rebuffs his suggestions to fix it. Rocky is unaware that Kathy has helped Linda Carter (Kellie Bright), Denise Fox (Diane Parish), Sharon Watts (Letitia Dean), Stacey Slater (Lacey Turner) and Suki Panesar (Balvinder Sopal) bury the body of Keanu Taylor (Danny Walters) under the café floor. To stop Rocky from asking more questions, Kathy reluctantly informs the police of Rocky's insurance scam and he is arrested. Initially, Rocky plans on fighting the case, but Kathy persuades him not to, promising to be there when he is released. Rocky and Kathy tearfully bid farewell to each other. In March 2024, it is revealed that Rocky has been sentenced to 10 years imprisonment for the insurance scam.

In April 2025, Sonia meets her real father Terry Cant (Glen Davies) who asks her to come to Bali with him. Initially, Sonia considers this but has doubts when her sister Bianca Jackson (Patsy Palmer) says Terry physically attacked her. Sonia visits Rocky in prison for advice and she tells him that even though he wasn't her father, she always saw a father figure in him. Rocky tells her to follow her instincts and that home lies in the heart – not in a place and they promise to keep in touch. Sonia later decides to abandon Terry after she hears him insult her family; she later leaves Walford using Terry's plane tickets with Bianca and her daughters Bex Fowler (Jasmine Armfield) and Julia Fowler.

== Reception ==
The character's personality and Conley's performance were both well-received. In August 2021, Alice Penwill of Inside Soap reported that Rocky, then Terry, had become popular in his time on the show, saying that people were "hoping Rocky [would] be staying in Walford for a while yet". Brian Conley was longlisted for best newcomer at the 2021 Inside Soap Awards for his performance as Terry. After the twist that Rocky was revealed to be Dotty's uncle and not Sonia's father was aired, Angie Quinn of MyLondon described the twist as one that left fans "gobsmacked". Quinn noted that Twitter users didn't see the reveal coming, describing it as "great". The twist was labelled a "shock" by Inside Soap. The magazine company also reported that many viewers were "hoping [Rocky] would stick around" after the character suffered a heart attack. In an end-of-year review of multiple British soap operas, including EastEnders, Coronation Street, Emmerdale, and Hollyoaks, Inside Soap named the identity reveal as the "most OMG" EastEnders moment of 2021. Lewis Knight of Radio Times called the character a "loveable rogue". Upon the announcement of Conley's exit from the soap, he was said to be a "big hit with fans" by Sabrina Barr of Metro. Inside Soap called Rocky's decision to trust Nish "naive". Laura Denby and Lewis Knight said that Rocky's "cheeky persona" would be missed and called him "an honourable man, if not always an honest one". Knight and Helen Daly labelled Rocky's departure as "heartbreaking".
