= Dotty Cotton =

Fictional character from EastEnders

- EastEnders character
- Milly Zero as Dotty Cotton (2019)
- Portrayed by: Molly Conlin (2008–2010); Milly Zero (2019–2022)
- Duration: 2008–2010, 2019–2022
- First appearance: Episode 3708; 26 December 2008
- Last appearance: Episode 6610; 16 December 2022
- Introduced by: Diederick Santer (2008); Jon Sen (2019)
- Spin-off appearances: The Queen Vic Quiz Night (2020)
- Molly Conlin as Dotty Cotton (2008)
In-universe information
- Other names: Kirsty Dorothy Cotton
- Occupation: Student; Barmaid; Mechanic; Nightclub manager
- Father: Nick Cotton
- Mother: Sandy Gibson
- Half-brothers: Charlie Cotton; Ashley Cotton
- Grandfathers: Charlie Cotton
- Grandmothers: Dot Cotton
- Uncles: Tom "Rocky" Cotton; Andrew Cotton
- Nephews: Matthew Mitchell Cotton
- Other relatives: Reiss Colwell; Julia Fowler

Dotty Cotton is a fictional character from the BBC soap opera EastEnders, played by Molly Conlin from 2008 to 2010 and Milly Zero from 2019 to 2022. She was introduced on 26 December 2008 as the daughter of established character Nick Cotton (John Altman). Nick uses Dotty as his partner-in-crime; they plan to kill his mother Dot Branning (June Brown) and inherit the money from her will. She and Dot subsequently become close after Dotty sabotages Nick's murder attempt at the last minute. In her final storyline which aired on 23 February 2010, she left with her mother Sandy (Caroline Pegg), who she believed died. On 3 October 2019, Dotty returned, with the role recast to Milly Zero. In December 2021, Sandy (now played by Martha Cope) tells her that she is not Nick's daughter, and that her father is Tom "Rocky" Cotton (Brian Conley). However, in September 2022, this is revealed to be a lie. On 13 November 2022, it was announced that Zero had quit the show and Dotty left on 16 December 2022.

Initially, critics disliked the character of Dotty. Jane Simon from The Daily Mail criticised her accent. Critics from The Daily Mirror and The Guardian were glad to see her leave. However, executive producer Diederick Santer praised Conlin for her portrayal of Dotty, whilst both Brown and Altman opined that the storyline was one of their highlights.

== Creation and development ==
=== Casting, introduction and development ===
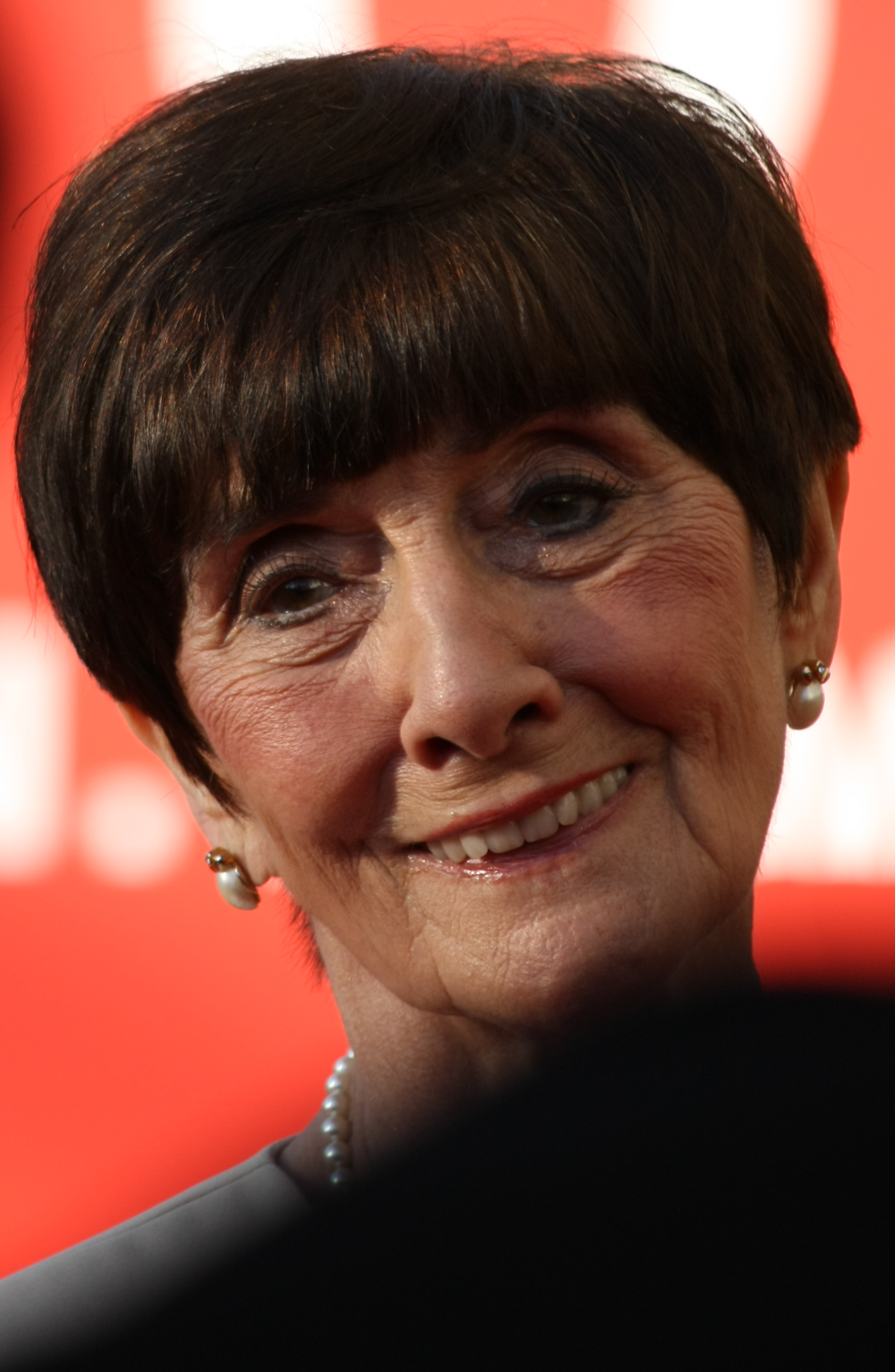
Dotty and her father Nick (John Altman) planned to kill Dot (June Brown, pictured).

On 2 October 2008 it was reported that Nick Cotton, played by John Altman would return to EastEnders in Christmas 2008. After spending time in Walsall, Nick would return with an eight-year-old daughter, Dotty. The part of Dotty was cast to Molly Conlin, speaking of her casting, Conlin said, "I'm really excited about it because I have always wanted to be in EastEnders." Conlin was considered too old for the part of Tiffany Dean which she had previously auditioned for but she succeeded in impressing the producers, who offered her the role of Dotty instead. The part of Tiffany went to Maisie Smith. Dotty was originally eleven years old, but on Conlin's casting, they changed her age to seven. Introduced as a guest character by Santer she made her first appearance on 26 December 2008.

Starting to appear more frequently, Dotty became a recurring character. Santer told Digital Spy in May 2009 that Dotty's storyline would go "to a very, very dark place!" He questioned whether the character was born bad or if her father had made her that way, and if she could be more dangerous than Nick. As the storyline between Dot, Dotty and Nick progressed, Nick's true agenda was revealed when he blackmailed his mother into giving him money for custody of Dotty. In a further plot twist, it was revealed to the audience in 2009, that Dotty was colluding with her father all along. The plot climaxed in June 2009 and marked Altman's departure from the show for the fourth time. Dotty later left on 23 February 2010.

=== Characterisation ===
Dotty is introduced as a seven-year-old child who has pigtails. The EastEnders website described her as "butter wouldn't melt when it comes to this cockney sparrow, but underneath she's a devil in disguise", as well as conniving, backstabbing and cold-hearted. Altman described Dotty as "a chip off the old block", as did Nancy Banks-Smith from The Guardian though the Daily Record described Dotty as "a chip off her grandma's block". Charlie Clements, who played Bradley Branning, said that Dotty, being Nick's daughter, was "bound to be a bit iffy." He also called her "evil", as did several critics. Simon called Dotty "[the] apple that hasn't fallen far from the tree." On Holy Soap, Dotty is called a "demon child" and "sweetness and light" on the surface, "but underneath lurks a devil!". Nancy Banks-Smith from The Guardian described Dotty as "enigmatic", while Kris Green from Digital Spy compared Dotty's image to that of Damien Thorn from The Omen and Regan MacNeil from The Exorcist.

=== Reintroduction (2019) ===
On 25 July 2019, it was announced that Dotty would be reintroduced, with the role recast to Milly Zero.

== Storylines ==
=== 2008–2010 ===
Dotty arrives in Walford on Christmas Day with Nick to see her estranged grandmother Dot Branning (June Brown). Nick introduces Dot to Dotty and they quickly bond. Nick lies to Dot that he had promised to send money to Sandy on the condition that she named their daughter Dorothy after her grandmother, so that Dot will trust him and bond with his daughter; Dot does not know Dotty's real name. After spending the night, Dotty begs Dot to let them stay longer. Dot soon discovers that Nick is unemployed and he and Dotty have been living rough. Nick says he will either put Dotty into care or sell her to Dot. After serious consideration, she buys Dotty to get her away from Nick. Dotty learns that Dot has left all her money to Dotty in her will, and tells Nick. They plan to kill Dot to inherit the money, and trick her into thinking she is suffering from dementia. Eventually, Nick tells Dotty to give Dot an overdose of her medication, but, Dotty has a change of heart and gives the pills to Nick in his beer. When Nick learns of Dotty's double-crossing, he drags her to the café and holds everyone inside hostage. Dotty escapes with most of the others, but the café explodes, and in the commotion, Nick escapes. Suspecting that Dotty might be just as evil as Nick, Dot plants some tablets on the kitchen table while Dotty's back is turned. Dot leaves the room and spies on Dotty, who ignores the tablets.

Dot holds a birthday party for Dotty, inviting Tiffany (Maisie Smith) and Liam Butcher (James Forde), but they do not want to attend. The next day, Tiffany tells Dotty she is not invited to her birthday party. Dotty tells Dot that Tiffany is not having a party and asks if they can invite her round. When they ask Tiffany's mother Bianca Jackson (Patsy Palmer), Bianca invites them to Tiffany's party. The next day, Tiffany and Dotty lie so they do not have to go to school. Dotty takes Tiffany's bridesmaid's dress and MP3 player, after Tiffany does not allow her to try the dress on, and runs away with them, throwing the MP3 player into a bin. Dotty pushes Tiffany into the bin as she tries to retrieve it. Dotty then runs away to avoid getting in trouble, and when Tiffany is found, Bianca visits Dot, who is unsure about Bianca's claims. Dotty tells Dot she knows nothing about the dress but Dot then finds it in Dotty's school bag. Dot returns the dress to Bianca without Dotty's knowledge. The next day, Dotty is left alone with Dot's husband Jim Branning (John Bardon) who is recovering from a stroke. She pours water on him to make it seem he has wet himself, but Dot catches her. Dotty says she hates them both and wishes that Nick had killed Dot. Dot smacks Dotty across the legs and Dotty manipulates her into letting her stay off school. After Dotty calls the police, Dot is arrested for assault but is released without charge and Dotty apologises.

Dot receives a visit from Dotty's mother Sandy. Dot assumes she is from Social Services, but Sandy says she is looking for her daughter Kirsty. Dot says she knows nobody of that name, but when she sees a photo she realises that it is Dotty. Dot hides Sandy's visit from Dotty, but later talks to Sandy about her daughter and her past. She also asks Dotty about the friends and family she used to have, but Dotty says Dot is the only family she needs. However, she soon admits that she misses her mother, and Dot reveals that she is alive and Nick had lied to her. Dotty says she wants to see her mother, so Dot calls her. When Sandy arrives, Dotty is delighted and Dot tells Dotty she should go with Sandy. They say an emotional goodbye, and Dot says she can visit at any time.

In May 2012, Dot and her sister Rose Cotton (Polly Perkins) go to live with Dotty and Sandy. In January 2013, it is revealed that Dotty and Sandy are in Florida. In March 2014, Dot reveals Dotty and Sandy cannot attend Nick's funeral, because Dotty has a cold. Dot visits Dotty and Sandy at their new home near the Mumbles in Swansea in October 2017.

=== 2019–2022 ===
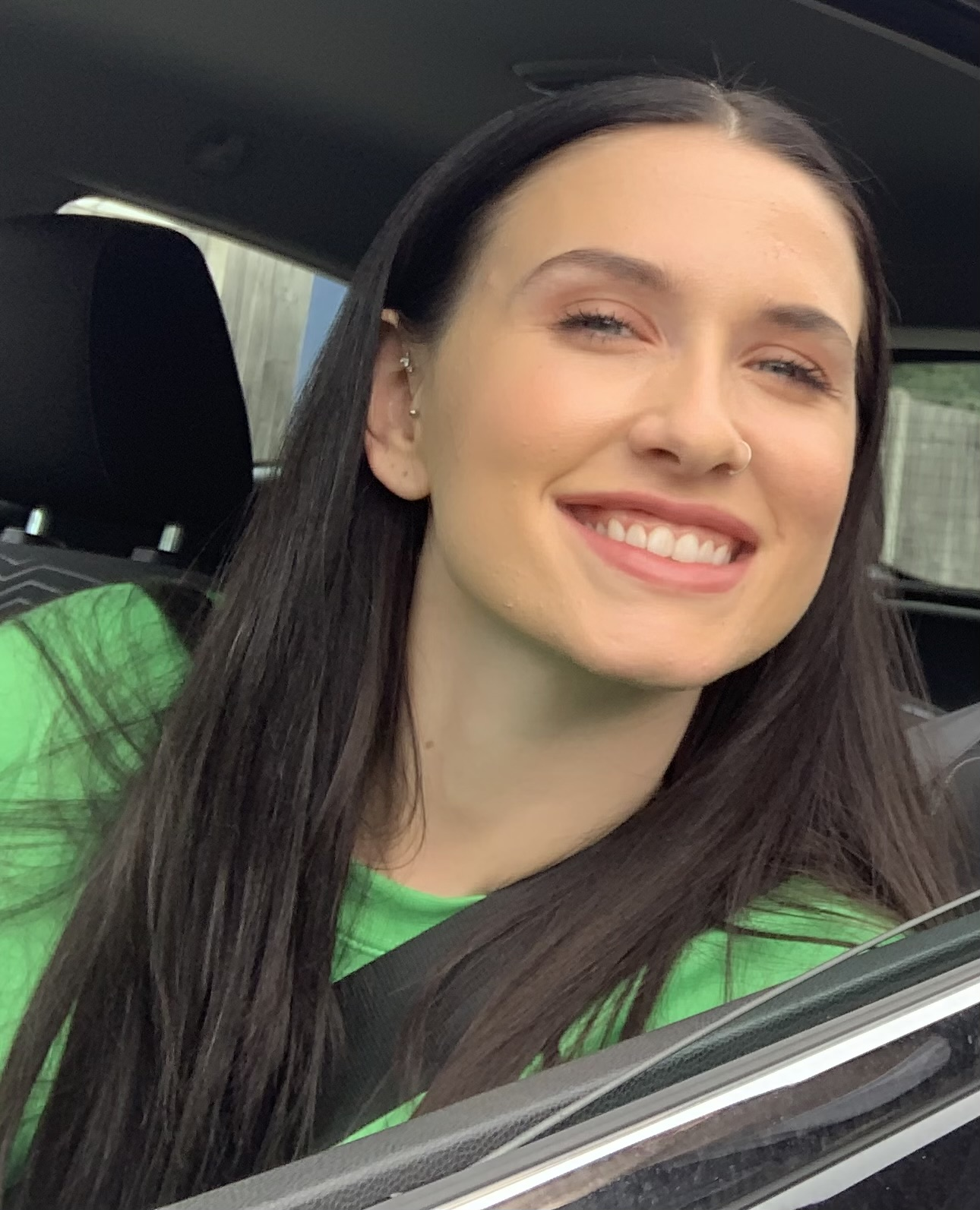
Milly Zero (pictured) was cast as Dotty in 2019.

In October 2019, Dot returns to Walford after visiting family, and brings Dotty back with her, as Dotty was bored with her life in Wales. She explains that she wants to study in London, and attends the leaving party of Bex Fowler (Jasmine Armfield), and flirts with Tiffany's husband Keegan Baker (Zack Morris). Dotty gives Bex the details of a drug dealer, who supplies Bex with poisoned drugs. While on a boat party, the boat crashes and Bex falls unconscious, being taken into hospital while Dotty looks on. Dennis Rickman Jnr (Bleu Landau), Dotty's friend and colleague, dies on the boat, and she later discovers a voicemail that reveals Ian Beale (Adam Woodyatt) locked him in. Dotty then blackmails Ian, asking for The Arches, otherwise she will expose him. Ian destroys the voicemail and Dennis' mother Sharon Watts (Letitia Dean) refuses to believe Dotty when she accuses Ian in public. She initially studies an engineering degree at university but Ian has her expelled as revenge for her blackmailing him. Dot moves to Ireland to live with Dotty's half-brother Charlie Cotton (Declan Bennett), leaving her step-granddaughter Sonia Fowler (Natalie Cassidy) in charge of her home. Dotty is bitter when Dot gives Sonia inheritance money she believes is rightfully hers. Ruby Allen (Louisa Lytton) hires Dotty to work at her nightclub when she drops out of university. Tiffany and Keegan move in with Dotty and Sonia, and also start working with Dotty at Ruby's nightclub. Dotty develops an interest in Peter Beale (Dayle Hudson), despite receiving attention from his half-brother Bobby (Clay Milner Russell); however, their romance soon fizzles out.

In 2021, Dotty has a one-night stand with her friend Vinny Panesar (Shiv Jalota); although he has feelings for her, she does not reciprocate them which puts a strain on their friendship. Dotty's devious behaviour continues: she is infuriated when Sonia receives power of attorney over Dot's money. Wanting money to pay for Sandy's rehab, she ropes her uncle Tom "Rocky" Cotton (Brian Conley) into pretending to be Sonia's long-lost father in order to con her. When the truth is revealed, Sandy reveals that Rocky is Dotty's biological father, although this is later proven to be false when Rocky confirms that he never slept with Sandy. Dotty's manipulative behaviour makes her very unpopular, often finding herself between homes and often relying on Rocky or Sonia for accommodation. She nearly destroys Tiffany and Keegan's marriage when she sleeps with Keegan. She later begins a relationship with Vinny, and despite having no feelings for him, she is worried about being made homeless. She ultimately betrays him by sleeping with Finlay Baker (Ashley Byam). Vinny is heartbroken when he finds out, which leads to Dotty being thrown out and later being punched in the face by Vinny's sister Ash Panesar (Gurlaine Kaur Garcha).

When Rocky's close friend Harvey Monroe (Ross Boatman) accuses her of stealing his wallet, a crime of which Dotty is innocent of for a change, she seeks revenge by catfishing Harvey and he sends her £10,000. Bobby and his friend Freddie Slater (Bobby Brazier) both discover the truth and urge her to come clean. The truth is eventually exposed and Rocky demands that Dotty repay the money. When Dot dies, although Dotty is upset, her greedy nature is exposed once more as she is convinced she will inherit Dot's estate. Although Dotty inherits £10,000, the majority of Dot's estate goes to Sonia, including Dot's house. A furious Dotty gets drunk and splashes alcohol everywhere in an attempt to burn the house down. Although she is unsuccessful, and Sonia pleads for her to stay, Dotty packs her bags and leaves in a taxi, parting on bad terms with her family and telling Walford to "go to hell".

== Reception ==
Jane Simon from the Daily Mirror criticised Dotty's accent and the storyline surrounding poisoning Dot. Stuart Heritage from The Guardian said that Dotty gave him "the willies". He said, "Technically Dotty has already left EastEnders, but it was an open-ended goodbye and she's free to return whenever she likes. This must not happen, simply because she gives me the willies more than anything else I've ever seen", Simon similarly opined saying that she was glad to see Dotty leave. Brown opined that Dot and Nick's storyline with Dotty was one of her highlights of the series, as did Altman. Santer praised Conlin for her portrayal of Dotty saying, "I love that little girl because she's having to play all these layers. Normally, what kids have to do of that age is say lines and be cute. She, though, has to play layers of deception. She has to play a character who's acting."

== See also ==
- List of soap opera villains
