= All at Sea (TV series) =

Children's British television sitcom

- All at Sea title card
- Created by: Brian Lynch
- Developed by: Brian Lynch
- Directed by: Dave Unwin; Paul Murphy; Tracey Rooney; Paul Riordan; Delyth Thomas
- Starring: Ryan Wilkinson: Sam Hattersley; Steve Edge; Nicola Stephenson; Milly Zero; Olivia Cosgrove; Adam Greaves-Neal
- Theme music composer: Paul Honey
- Country of origin: United Kingdom
- Original language: English
- No. of series: 2 + 1 Special
- No. of episodes: 26

Production
- Executive producer: Connal Orton
- Producers: Juliet Charlesworth; Mike Watts; Lucinda Whiteley
- Camera setup: Multi-camera
- Running time: 28 minutes

Original release
- Network: CBBC
- Release: 25 September 2013 – 17 December 2015

All at Sea is a British children's television sitcom set in a bed and breakfast. The series aired on CBBC from 2013 to 2015. It stars Nicola Stephenson, Steve Edge, Ryan Wilkinson, Olivia Cosgrove and Sam Hattersley amongst others. It is filmed on location in Scarborough and various locations around South Manchester (principally Stockport) and at studios in Manchester. The house filmed is located in Bowdon, Altricham. A second series began airing in September 2014. The series was nominated for the 2014 Kids' BAFTA awards for Best Comedy. It was nominated again in 2015 for the same award. "Santa" was the final episode. Repeats of the show began airing on 1 May 2019 at 17:00 on the CBBC Channel.

== Plot ==
The series revolves around the chaotic misadventures of the Enright family, who have recently moved to Scarborough to run a bed-and-breakfast by the sea. Their middle child and eldest son, Charlie, is a deceptive and mischievous troublemaker who is constantly plotting schemes to achieve his goal with his best friends, the equally-troublesome Alison and the level-headed and more sensible Ben. Charlie's parents, Kevin and Helen, run the dysfunctional bed-and-breakfast and usually try to improve it in different ways, while his vain, rude older sister Hannah is often trying to achieve a goal too, and his eccentric, gullible younger brother Louie believing a tale that will traumatize him and will try to conquer it. Each episode ends with Charlie complaining about his punishment by uttering his catchphrase – "It's a travesty of justice!" The only episodes that didn't end with this is the Series 1 Christmas special "Murderer" and the 2015 Christmas special "Santa". Although filmed with all the Series 2 episodes in the summer of 2014, "Santa" did not actually air until 2015, therefore not being part of Series 2. It was the final episode.

Repeats stopped airing in June 2017 but returned in May 2019. In September 2019 a boxset of the entire first series was made available on BBC iPlayer, and the second series became available in October 2019. Repeats continue to air regularly on CBBC.

== Main cast ==
Cast list of All At Sea
Actor	Character	Series		
Actor	Character	1	2	Special
Ryan Wilkinson	Charlie	Main	Main	Main
Olivia Cosgrove	Alison	Main	Main	Main
Steve Edge	Kevin	Main	Main	Main
Nicola Stephenson	Helen	Main	Main	Main
Sam Hattersley	Ben	Main	Main	Main
Milly Zero	Hannah	Main	Main	Main
Adam Greaves-Neal	Louie	Main	Main	Main

== Episodes ==
Series	Episodes	Originally aired	
Series	Episodes	First aired	Last aired
1	13	25 September 2013	17 December 2013
2	12	26 September 2014	12 December 2014
Special	1	17 December 2015	

=== Series 1 (2013) ===
No. in show	No. in series	Title	Directed by	Written by	Original release date
1	1	"Seagull"	Matt Bloom	Daniel Peak	25 September 2013
Charlie accidentally destroys the windshield of his neighbour Mr. Leith's car, and a boy named Roy is framed for the crime. Feeling guilty, Charlie and his friends Ben and Alison try to help Roy, but end up putting him through more trouble. Meanwhile, Charlie's older sister Hannah develops a love interest in a boy named Ryan, where she joins a group cleaning at the beach, while their younger brother Louie's contraction of head lice spreads across the Enright family and parents Helen and Kevin must save the health of the B&B.
2	2	"Vase"	Matt Bloom	Brian Lynch	2 October 2013
Charlie accidentally destroys his mother Helen's new birthday present vase. Hannah is dismayed when she is forced to be babysat by her classmate Carol.
3	3	"Artist"	Matt Bloom	Brian Lynch	9 October 2013
4	4	"Alien"	Matt Bloom	Brian Lynch	16 October 2013
5	5	"Biscuits"	Matt Bloom	Joe Hepworth	23 October 2013
6	6	"Carwash"	Matt Bloom	Madeleine Brettingham	30 October 2013
7	7	"Gymnast"	Paul Murphy	Madeleine Brettingham	6 November 2013
8	8	"Piano"	Paul Murphy	Mark Hodkinson	13 November 2013
9	9	"Rabbit"	Paul Murphy	Brian Lynch	20 November 2013
10	10	"Bee Boy"	Tracey Rooney	David Isaac and Brian Lynch	27 November 2013
Hannah tries to come up with a new business idea for her school project and starts to worry when a competitive Kevin offers to help, creating a rivalry with Mr Leith. Meanwhile, after being banned from the comic book store, Charlie and his friends attempt to be the first ones to meet the writer of their favourite comic book series, with disastrous results.
11	11	"Dog"	Tracey Rooney	Daniel Peak	4 December 2013
Trouble arises when Ben receives a dog as a birthday present and Charlie is mistaken for being blind whilst inside the arcade.
12	12	"Chips"	Tracey Rooney	Brian Lynch	11 December 2013
Roy returns, and Charlie embarks on a catering venture in hope of making some money.
13	13	"Murderer"	Tracey Rooney	Brian Lynch	17 December 2013
Christmas Special, in which Charlie is convinced that Mr. Leith has murdered his wife.

=== Series 2 (2014) ===
No. in show	No. in series	Title	Directed by	Written by	Original release date
14	1	"Valentine"	Delyth Thomas	Brian Lynch	26 September 2014
Charlie and his friends befriend a guest, who is marrying his girlfriend and hopes to propose to her with a ring, in the hope to earn money. But when he hands the trio the responsibility of the ring, they lose it and ruin his life.
15	2	"Chicken"	Delyth Thomas	Brian Lynch	3 October 2014
Charlie and his friends try to exploit Kevin's chicken for cash, however they find themselves in conflict with their families.
16	3	"Baby"	Delyth Thomas	Brian Lynch	10 October 2014
Kevin's goddaughter is being baptised, while Charlie causes havoc. When Ben makes a stain remover to remove a stain on Charlie's shirt, Kevin mistakenly uses the cloth as a normal washing cloth which makes the baby go green. Hoping to delay the christening before Grace's so she can recover from the stain remover, he soon causes havoc turning everyone else green.
17	4	"Statues"	Delyth Thomas	Kirstie Falkous	17 October 2014
18	5	"Pride of Scarborough (Note: was shortened down to "Pride" in the actual episode.)"	Paul Riordan	Madeline Brettingham	24 October 2014
Charlie deceives his parents and the police that he has foiled a burglary, escalating into him being nominated for an award. Meanwhile, Kevin invests in a hot-tub, but Helen is unsure it will elevate the bed and breakfast to spa status.
19	6	"Halloween"	Paul Riordan	Brian Lynch	31 October 2014
After realising their arch-enemy Tuttle's scheme for Halloween, Charlie and the gang decide to beat him by making Ben pose as a wheelchair-ridden boy to earn more sweets. Meanwhile, Kevin tries to create the neighbourhood's biggest Halloween display using untested fireworks, which leads to disaster, while Hannah deals with her broken leg and Helen tries to prove that the Enright family are good people.
20	7	"Dummy"	Paul Riordan	Mark Hodkinson	7 November 2014
Charlie, Ben and Alison work with a "Punch and Judy" puppeteer to help improve his act. Meanwhile, Helen tries to prove she is "hip" with Hannah, while Louie invites his friend Conor to stay over at the bed and breakfast, whom Kevin assumes is Louie's imaginary friend by making him do chores around the house.
21	8	"Gumball"	Paul Riordan	Madeleine Brettingham	14 November 2014
When Ben gets his hand stuck in a gumball machine, Charlie takes over his place in his magic act in a talent competition. Meanwhile, Kevin befriends the father of the new leader of Hannah's dance crew, whom she jealously frames for vandalism, while Louie develops a fear of scarecrows.
22	9	"Horror"	Tracey Rooney	Daniel Peak	21 November 2014
Charlie attempts to make a horror film for Scarborough's local film festival, with the help of Ben and Alison.
23	10	"Beast"	Tracey Rooney	Kirstie Falkous	28 November 2014
When Charlie accidentally loses all the chickens, he deceives his parents into believing a "beast" was responsible, leading to ever more chaos. Meanwhile, Louie believes he has three wishes from a chicken feather, and Hannah attempts to find a date for a party.
24	11	"Wrestler"	Tracey Rooney	Mark Hodkinson	5 December 2014
When Wrestle-Hysteria come to Scarborough, Charlie, Ben and Alison scheme to receive tickets for the event by Ben posing as a wealthy and posh boy named Gambit to impress a Wrestle-Hysteria wrestler and his daughter. Meanwhile, Helen and Kevin read Hannah's diary and use it as a source of understanding her thoughts, and Louie is convinced that he is using favouritsm on his clothes.
25	12	"Wreath"	Paul Riordan	Mark Oswin	12 December 2014
Charlie causes chaos for two different sets of mourners when he tries to replace a funeral wreath.

=== Christmas Special (2015) ===
No. in show	No. in series	Title	Directed by	Written by	Original release date
26	-	"Santa"	Tracey Rooney	Brian Lynch	17 December 2015
It's Christmas in Scarborough. Charlie sets up a Santa's Grotto in a public toilet to get money to buy Mum perfume after spending £500 on downloading a bunch of movies on her phone. Meanwhile, Hannah dates a very strange and controlling boy named Ted just for the expensive presents and Louie thinks Santa is following him. Note: The opening titles were modified for this episode featuring many clips from the series 1 Christmas special, "Murderer".
