= Maisie Smith =

English actress and singer (born 2001)

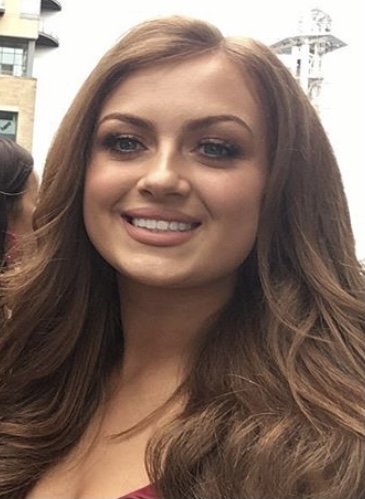
- Smith in 2019
- Born: Maisie Louise Collender Smith; 9 July 2001 (age 25); Westcliff, Essex, England
- Occupations: Actress; singer
- Years active: 2006–present
- Television: EastEnders; Strictly Come Dancing
- Partner: Max George (2022–present)
- Website: officiallymaisie.com

Maisie Louise Collender Smith (born 9 July 2001) is an English actress and singer. She appeared in the feature film The Other Boleyn Girl (2008) and played the regular role of Tiffany Butcher in the BBC soap opera EastEnders from 2008 to 2014. In November 2016, Smith temporarily returned to EastEnders for a guest stint, before making a full-time return in January 2018. In October 2021 it was announced that she would once again be leaving EastEnders and her final scenes aired in December of that year; she made a one-off appearance in March 2022 to aid the departure of Keegan Baker (Zack Morris). In 2020, she competed in the eighteenth series of Strictly Come Dancing alongside partner Gorka Marquez, reaching the final but losing out to Bill Bailey.

== Career ==
Smith attended the Singer Stage School in Leigh-on-Sea for 18 months, and in 2006, she was cast in the film The Other Boleyn Girl as a young Elizabeth I; the film was released in February 2008. She then went on to portray the role of Tiffany Dean in the BBC soap opera EastEnders. Smith made her first appearance on the soap on 1 April 2008, at age six, as the daughter of Bianca Jackson (Patsy Palmer). Her mother stated "The role is an exaggeration of her own personality, she's a little madam. A lively character both on and off screen. The difference is, she's told to pronounce her t's at home! She is not star-struck at all and has her feet very firmly on the ground. She is an extremely confident child and a great actress." Smith's father said, "She gets recognised quite a lot when we go out as a family. It's funny when you see people nudge each other and you can hear them saying, ‘Is that the girl off EastEnders?’"

A few months after her casting, Smith said that she was loving being on EastEnders, telling the Echo (Essex) "I love being on EastEnders. I really get on with Patsy who plays my mum. She looks after me so well. It's like I'm her real daughter some days. Everyone is really nice. Pam St Clement, who plays Pat Butcher, is also really lovely to me. I’m glad I get to be cheeky and say some funny lines. I would never want to be a goody goody. It's strange people point at me in the street now and ask if I’m the girl from EastEnders. All my friends think it's great I’m on television. I think I will want to be an actress forever now."

Digital Spy's Kris Green said Smith is "brilliant" and "one...to watch", comparing her to Ellis Hollins, the award-winning child actor who plays Tom Cunningham in the Channel 4 teen soap opera Hollyoaks. She has also been praised by stage school teacher Sandra Singer, who said, "Maisie has the most incredible memory and when it comes to script work she is fantastic. It is often very difficult for a six-year-old to act, but she handles it really well and adores it."

In 2010, Smith was asked to appear on CITV's Bookaboo, and read the story Stinky by Ian Whybrow. Smith told CITV "You have to be quiet in libraries which is really hard for me as I'm very loud. I would probably come last in a 'who can stay quiet the longest' competition!" In 2011, Smith was interviewed by The Stage magazine where she talked about her role in EastEnders. Smith said, "Sudden fame can be tricky when you are just out having fun and people keep wanting to take your photo, but the EastEnders people are very supportive and have said that we can politely say no in situations where we feel uncomfortable. I am very glad that my break came with EastEnders, as they are like a family who look after you. Working on the show has given me the chance to learn so much from the actors, especially those who are in my TV family. There are lots of things you can only learn from actually working on a set. The stage school I attend –also Singer Stage School – prepares you really well, but it is so different when you are actually there on set being filmed."

In October 2016, it was announced Smith would be releasing her first single, "Good Thing". Smith shot a music video accompanying the song at the Belt Craft studios and the song and video was uploaded to Smith's YouTube channel in November 2016. Smith released her second single, "Where My Heart Is", in March 2017. Smith said a lot of her songs were about herself, so she "wanted to write a song that inspired others" and she hopes "that got across" and that it "manages to inspire those who listen". On 3 November 2016, Smith made a previously unannounced temporary return to EastEnders. Smith returned full-time in January 2018.

In September 2020, it was announced that she would be competing in the eighteenth series of Strictly Come Dancing. She was partnered with Gorka Márquez. In December 2020, they finished in second place alongside Hrvy & Janette Manrara and Jamie Laing & Karen Hauer, after losing out to Bill Bailey and Oti Mabuse.

In May 2022, it was announced Smith would be making her musical theatre debut in Strictly Ballroom: The Musical, playing Fran.

In October 2022, Smith was one of four finalists who completed series 4 of Celebrity SAS: Who Dares Wins.

In April 2024, Smith was cast as Beth, the Parson's Wife in Jeff Wayne's Musical Version of The War of the Worlds for the 2025 The Spirit of Man tour.

== Personal life ==
Smith lives in Westcliff-on-Sea, Essex, with her parents and sister. Smith attended Belfairs Academy in Leigh-on-Sea and the Sandra Singer Stage School. Smith attended South Essex College, where she studied musical theatre. As of September 2022, she is in a relationship with singer Max George.

== Awards and nominations ==
Year	Award	Category	Work	Result	Ref.
2009	The British Soap Awards	Best Dramatic Performance for a Young Actor or Actress	EastEnders	Won	
2010	The British Soap Awards	Best Dramatic Performance for a Young Actor or Actress	EastEnders	Nominated	
2010	Inside Soap Awards	Best Young Actor	EastEnders	Nominated	
2011	The British Soap Awards	Best Young Performance	EastEnders	Nominated	
2011	Inside Soap Awards	Best Young Actor	EastEnders	Won	
2012	Inside Soap Awards	Best Young Actor	EastEnders	Shortlisted	
2013	The British Soap Awards	Best Young Performance	EastEnders	Nominated	
2013	Inside Soap Awards	Best Young Actor	EastEnders	Won	
2018	The British Soap Awards	Best Young Actor	EastEnders	Nominated	
2018	Inside Soap Awards	Best Young Actor	EastEnders	Shortlisted	
2019	TV Choice Awards	Best Soap Actress	EastEnders	Nominated	
2019	Digital Spy Reader Awards	Best Soap Actor (Female)	EastEnders	Fourth	
2020	I Talk Telly Awards	Best Soap Partnership (shared with Zack Morris)	EastEnders	Nominated	
2023	The Stage Debut Awards	Best Performer in a Musical	Strictly Ballroom: The Musical	Pending	

== Filmography ==
Year	Title	Role	Notes
2008	The Other Boleyn Girl	Young Elizabeth	Film
2008–2014, 2016, 2018–2022	EastEnders	Tiffany Butcher	Series regular
2010	EastEnders: Last Tango in Walford	Tiffany Butcher	Straight-to-DVD
2015	Released from Fear: A Restorative Justice Story	Lauren	Short film

Stage

Year	Title	Role	Notes
2022	Strictly Ballroom: The Musical	Fran	Churchill Theatre, Bromley / tour

As herself

Year	Title	Notes
2008	EastEnders: Ricky and Bianca	Special
2009–2014, 2018–2019	The British Soap Awards	Award winner and nominee
2009	Children in Need	EastEnders special
2010	EastEnders Live: The Aftermath	Documentary
2011	Bookaboo	Guest star
2011	Comic Relief	Guest star for EastEnders
2011	EastEnders Revealed	Episode: "Whitney's Story"
2016	Loose Women	1 episode
2020	EastEnders: Secrets from the Square	Episode: "Tiffany, Keegan and Karen"
2020	Strictly Come Dancing	Contestant; series 18
2022	Celebrity SAS: Who Dares Wins	Contestant; series 4
2023	The Chase Celebrity Special	Contestant; Series 13 Episode 7

== Discography ==
=== Extended plays ===
Title	Details
Where My Heart Is	Released: 15 September 2017; Label: Independent; Format: Digital download

=== Music videos ===
Title	Year	Director(s)
"Good Thing"	2016	Mark Potter
"Where My Heart Is"	2017	Mark Potter
