= Milly Zero =

British actress (born 1999)

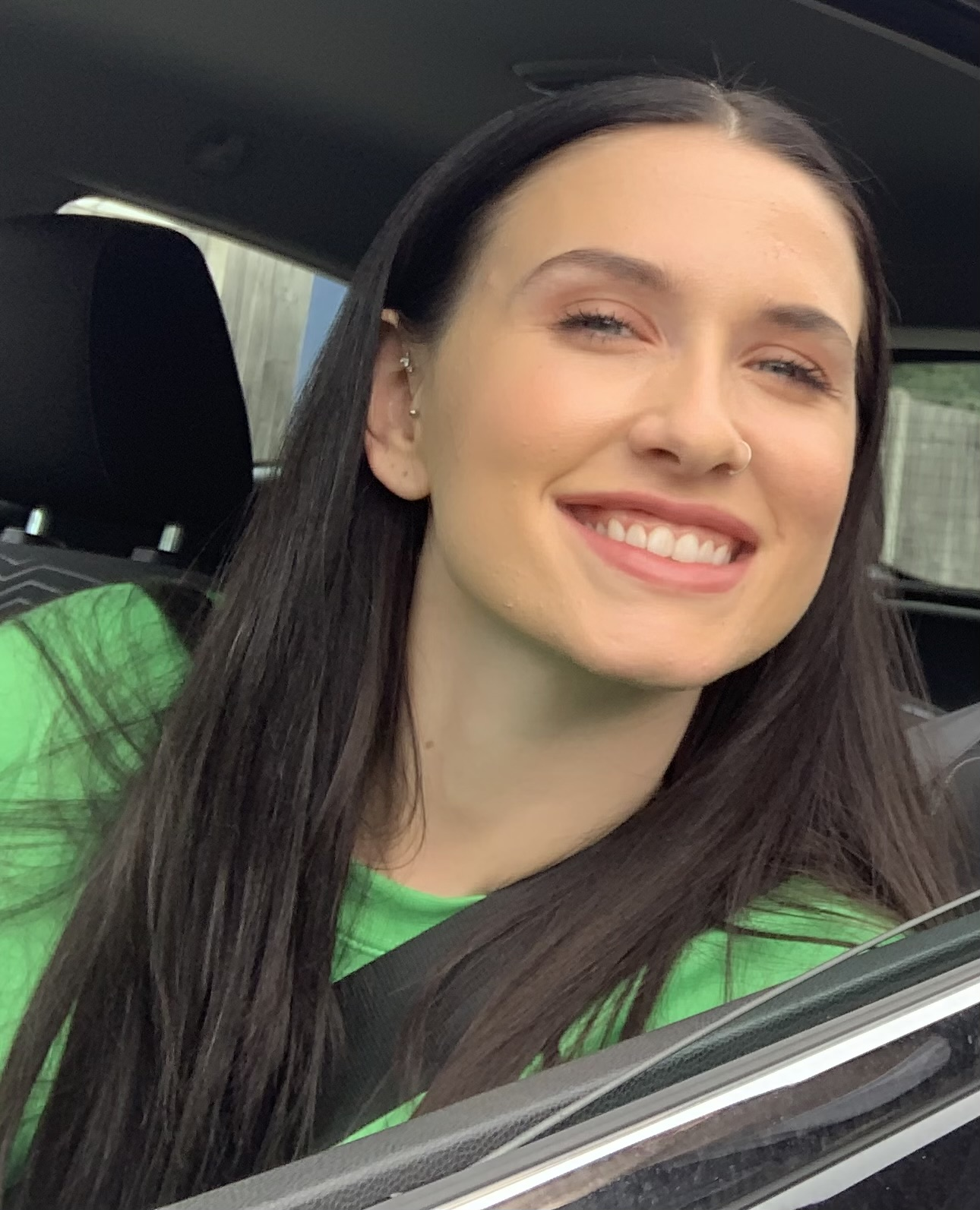
- Zero in 2022
- Born: Melissa Jasmine Skye Zero; 7 June 1999 (age 26); Peckham, London, England
- Education: BRIT School
- Years active: 2011–present
- Television: All at Sea; EastEnders

Melissa Jasmine Skye Zero (born 7 June 1999) is an English actress. She has portrayed Hannah on the CBBC children's sitcom All at Sea (2013–2015) and Dotty Cotton in the BBC soap opera EastEnders (2019–2022).

== Life and career ==
Zero was born on 7 June 1999 in Peckham, London. In 2013, she began attending the BRIT School, which she graduated from in 2017 with three A-levels. She began her career making appearances in advertisements for companies including Sainsbury's and Bliss.

Zero was cast in the CBBC series All at Sea aged 13 and appeared in the series for two years. On 3 October 2019, Zero made her debut as Dotty Cotton in EastEnders, replacing Molly Conlin in the role. After three years in the role, she left EastEnders and her final appearance aired in December 2022. Following her exit, she was cast as Hermia in a production of A Midsummer Night's Dream, as well as appearing in a September 2023 episode of the BBC soap opera Doctors as Lisa Gillespie. In 2025, Zero appeared in an episode of the Netflix series Too Much as a nurse.

== Filmography ==
Year	Title	Role	Notes	Ref.
2011	Show Me What You're Made Of	Herself		
2012	All About the McKenzies	Marsha	Web series	
2013–2015	All at Sea	Hannah	Main role	
2016	The Crown	Teen	Uncredited	
2017	The Foreigner	Daughter	Film role	
2019–2022	EastEnders	Dotty Cotton	Regular role	
2022	Better	Kitty	Short film	
2023	YRO	Chloe	Short film	
2023	The Night Bus	Girl A	Short film	
2023	Doctors	Lisa Gillespie	Episode: "The Stolen Child"	
2023	Better	Kitty	Short film	
2025	Too Much	Nurse Ash	Episode: "Pity Woman"	

== Stage ==
Year	Title	Role	Venue	Ref.
2014	The Crucible	Elizabeth Proctor	BRIT School	
2019	The Wonderful World of Dissocia	Brittany	Arcola Theatre	
2021	The Green Room	Fifi	Theatre Peckham	
2023	A Midsummer Night's Dream	Hermia	Gatehouse Theatre	
2024	Over Your Dead Body	Her	Etcetera Theatre	

== Awards and nominations ==
Year	Award	Category	Nominated work	Result	Ref.
2020	RadioTimes.com Soap Awards	Best Newcomer	EastEnders	Nominated	
2020	Inside Soap Awards	Best Newcomer	EastEnders	Nominated	
