= Jack Branning =

Fictional character from EastEnders

- EastEnders character
- Portrayed by: Scott Maslen
- Duration: 2007–2013, 2015–present
- First appearance: Episode 3460; 29 October 2007
- Introduced by: Diederick Santer (2007); Dominic Treadwell-Collins (2015)
- Spin-off appearances: EastEnders: E20 (2011); The Queen Vic Quiz Night (2020)
In-universe information
- Occupation: Police officer; Businessman; Car salesman; Nightclub owner; Property developer; Detective Inspector
- Family: Branning/Mitchell
- Father: Jim Branning
- Mother: Reenie Branning
- Stepmother: Dot Cotton
- Brothers: Derek Branning; Max Branning
- Sisters: April Branning; Carol Jackson; Suzy Branning
- Wife: Selina Branning (backstory); Ronnie Mitchell (2010–2012, 2017)
- Civil partner: Denise Fox (2021–2024)
- Sons: Ricky Branning; James Branning
- Daughters: Penny Branning; Amy Mitchell
- Stepsons: Matthew Mitchell Cotton; Raymond Dawkins
- Stepdaughters: Chelsea Fox; Libby Fox
- Grandsons: Ethan Branning-Panesar
- Granddaughters: Charli Slater
- Nephews: Robbie Jackson; Billie Jackson; Bradley Branning; Joey Branning; Oscar Branning; Kevin
- Nieces: Bianca Jackson; Sonia Fowler; Alice Branning; Lauren Branning; Abi Branning; Annie Carter; Rebecca
- Other relatives: Liam Butcher; Tiffany Butcher; Morgan Butcher; Bex Fowler; Julia Fowler; Sami Jackson; Louie Beale; Jimmy Beale; Abi Branning

Jack Branning is a fictional character from the BBC soap opera EastEnders, played by Scott Maslen. He made his first appearance on 29 October 2007. He is the youngest child of Jim (John Bardon) and Reenie Branning (Joy Graham) and the brother of April Branning (Debbie Arnold), Carol Jackson (Lindsey Coulson), Derek (Jamie Foreman), Suzy (Maggie O'Neill) and Max Branning (Jake Wood). The character was introduced to the show during a period when EastEnders was being routinely criticised in the media for its reliance on resurrecting old characters. The casting of Maslen provoked some controversy, being the first time an actor had been poached from one mainstream soap to another. It was quickly established that Jack is a morally ambiguous character with a murky past in the police force resulting in the paralysis of his young daughter, Penny (Mia McKenna-Bruce). On 1 July 2019, Maslen filmed his 1,000th episode as Jack.

Maslen took a two-month break from the role in October 2010 to participate in the 2010 series of Strictly Come Dancing, returning in December 2010. Maslen made an indefinite departure from the role on 15 October 2013 after six years on the show. Having turned down a chance to return to the role in April 2015, Jack made a previously unannounced return on 24 December 2015, before leaving once again on 1 January 2016. Maslen returned to filming during the same month and Jack returned on-screen on 1 March 2016.

Jack has been involved in several key storylines and has embarked on feuds with his brothers, Max Branning (Jake Wood) and Derek Branning (Jamie Foreman), as well as Phil Mitchell (Steve McFadden), Sean Slater (Robert Kazinsky), Janine Butcher (Charlie Brooks), Michael Moon (Steve John Shepherd), Charlie Cotton (Declan Bennett), Hunter Owen (Charlie Winter), Ray Kelly (Sean Mahon), Ravi Gulati (Aaron Thiara) and Harry Mitchell (Elijah Holloway). Since returning in 2016, his storylines have included reuniting with Ronnie Mitchell (Samantha Womack), gaining custody of his son Ricky Mitchell (Henri Charles/Frankie Day), finding out Ronnie had drowned on their wedding day and his subsequent grief over her death, a custody battle with Charlie Cotton (Declan Bennett) over his stepson Matthew Mitchell Cotton, supporting his great-niece Tiffany Butcher (Maisie Smith) over her rape and confronting her attacker, rejoining the police force, relationships with Mel Owen (Tamzin Outhwaite) and Denise Fox (Diane Parish), discovering that Amy has been self-harming, dealing with his son Ricky becoming a father at twelve-years-old, an affair with Stacey Slater (Lacey Turner), helping The Six conceal their involvement in the murder of Keanu Taylor (Danny Walters), dealing with Amy being temporarily paralysed after a crush at Peggy's Nightclub, framing Penny (now Kitty Castledine) for causing the crush, and being blackmailed by Harry Mitchell (Elijah Holloway), splitting and being divorced from Denise but later reconciling, unintentionally shooting Zoe Slater (Michelle Ryan), and coping with Denise's diagnosis of acute myeloid leukaemia, a form of blood cancer.

== Creation ==
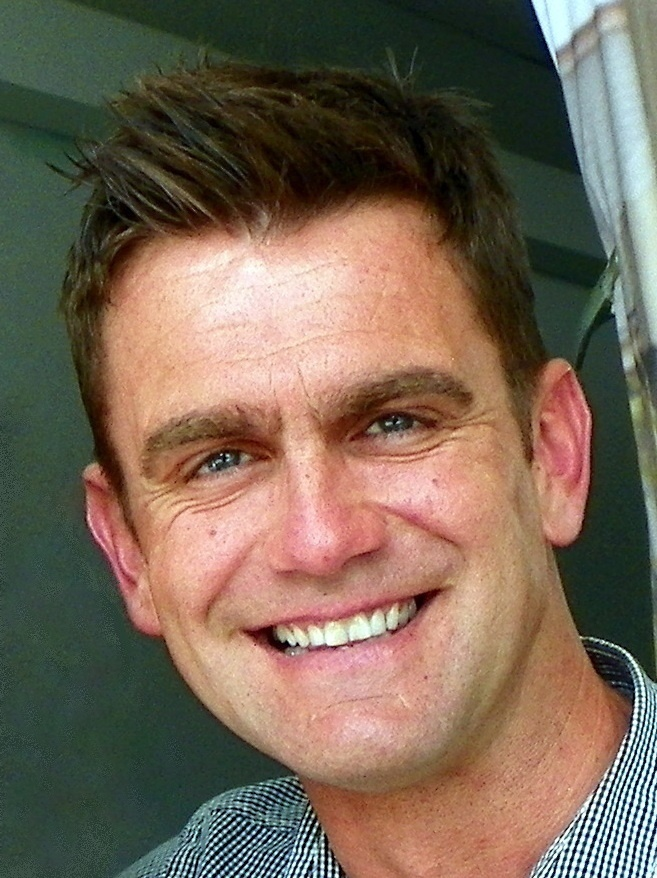
Scott Maslen was cast as Jack Branning.

=== Background ===
Jack Branning was one of several new characters to join the EastEnders cast in the second half of 2007. At a time when the show was undergoing media criticism for its resurrection of old characters, John Yorke, the BBC's controller of drama production, defended the show's ability to create interesting, new characters. He praised the show's executive producer Diederick Santer for his development of new, "strong characters", including Jack Branning and Roxy (Rita Simons) and Ronnie Mitchell (Samantha Womack). Speaking of this new wave of characters, he stated: "It feels like a new dynasty is emerging, which is important."

Prior to his introduction in October 2007, the character was referred to once, a week before his arrival. He is a member of the soap's Branning family; his sister Carol first appeared in the serial in 1993, while father Jim had debuted in 1996, and Jack's brother Max and his own family were introduced in June 2006.

=== Casting ===
Scott Maslen was cast in the role of Jack. Previously best known for his role as DS Phil Hunter in ITV police drama The Bill, the media were quick to pick up on the fact his new role was notably similar – with TV critic Jane Simon sarcastically commenting: "What a relief it must be for actor Scott Maslen to get a role that allows him to show off his incredible versatility." Maslen himself pointed out that the character of Jack was actually higher ranking than Phil Hunter, joking: "I've been promoted from playing a DS in Sun Hill!" Maslen's casting marked the first time an established actor had been poached from one mainstream soap to another. Speaking for the first time about his new role, Maslen said: "I was very sad to leave The Bill but after five years I wanted to explore new opportunities. The Bill afforded me some fantastic storylines. I'm really looking forward to playing Jack. He's an extremely competitive man who likes to win in business and in pleasure!"

== Development ==
Upon announcing his casting, Maslen described the character of Jack as "an extremely competitive man who always likes to win in business and in pleasure". He mentioned that there would be an "instant attraction" between Jack and fellow newcomer Ronnie Mitchell, and explained that he already had a longstanding friendship with Samantha Womack who plays Ronnie, having known her since he was 16 years old, and being godfather to her children.

The relationship between the two characters developed quickly from friendship to romance, with Womack commenting that due to her friendship with Maslen; "Our first kissing scene felt really uncomfortable, it was terrible, but we're over it now." Several media publications commented on the fact that the attraction between the two characters had been obvious, and bound to develop into more than a professional relationship.

As the character's personality developed, questions were raised over whether his intentions and motivations were good or bad, with Maslen explaining: "I call him amoral; neither good nor bad. He gets what he wants out of the situation but that isn’t necessarily just a selfish thing. He's not an evil character, but if there are people that are threatening him, his business or his family, he will do whatever he needs to do to eliminate that problem."

In April 2011, it was reported that Jack would have a one-night stand in May after trying to get over the loss of his son, and bed Tanya's sister, Rainie Cross (Tanya Franks).

=== Departure (2013) ===
In February 2013, it was announced that Maslen had quit his role as Jack and would leave the show later in the year at the end of his current contract. Maslen said, "I've loved playing Jack, and who wouldn't want to work on one of the most successful British TV series, but I've been offered many other roles and just not been able to explore them in the past, simply because of time and commitments to EastEnders, and so now it feels like the time to tread a new path for a while. I've played Jack for five and a half years and had some fantastic storylines, but it's now time to have a break from him and try something different. I'm incredibly attached to Jack, his family and EastEnders, but as an actor I'd like to take on some new challenges for a bit. EastEnders is just incredible, it's phenomenally rewarding and I love working here, but now it's time to move on to pastures new." Executive producer Lorraine Newman said, "Since October 2007, Scott Maslen has brought the wonderful Jack Branning to life on our screens. From Scott's heart-wrenching portrayal of a grieving father, to Jack's determination in the coming week to take on Phil Mitchell, the variety in Scott's material shows his fabulous range as an actor. Scott will remain on your screens until late in the year, and there is plenty more drama to be played out before his departure."

=== Reintroduction (2015) ===
Maslen made a surprise return as Jack on 24 December 2015 and departed once again on 1 January 2016. He returned full-time on 1 March 2016. Maslen said: "I'm looking forward to working with Dominic Treadwell-Collins. I worked with him before when he was a storyliner there. I'm really looking forward to working with him and the newer faces. There's so many exciting things going on at the minute. It was like I hadn't left. It felt a bit strange because there are new characters who I don't know – but that fits with the story. When you go away for a while and come back, there's always new people you gotta [sic] get to know and that's part of the fun of it. It felt great!"

== Storylines ==
=== Backstory ===
Jack is the youngest child of Jim (John Bardon) and Reenie Branning (Joy Graham) and brother of Derek Branning (Terence Beesley/ Jamie Foreman), Carol Jackson (Lindsey Coulson), April (Debbie Arnold), Suzy (Julie Christian-Young; Maggie O'Neill) and Max Branning (Jake Wood). Having grown up in a large family in a poor area of East London, Jack regularly fought his older brother, Max, for the attentions of his father who was an alcoholic. He was very close friends with Michael Moon (Steve John Shepherd), another local East End boy who went to school with him and had a closer relationship with him than he did with his brothers. As a teenager, Jack stole his grandfather's World War II medal, knowing that it was Jim's prized possession as his father had died in combat when he was only six years old, and blamed Max, causing a huge rift between Jim and Max and resulting in Max walking out in 1989. Despite Max and Jack being arch-rivals, they kept in touch as Jack was present at Max's wedding to Tanya Cross (Jo Joyner) in 1994 and watched his nieces Lauren (Madeline Duggan; Jacqueline Jossa) and Abi (Lorna Fitzgerald) grow up.

Jack settled down with Selina (Daisy Beaumont) and, after they married, they had a daughter, Penny (Mia McKenna-Bruce). Jack built a career in the police force, but got involved in criminal activities and when they backfired, one of Jack's informants knocked Selina and Penny down in revenge for being accidentally sent down. Penny's spinal cord was severed, putting her in a wheelchair and, in the aftermath, Jack and Selina divorced and he retired from the police force.

=== 2007–2013 ===
Jack comes to Walford for his nephew Bradley Branning's (Charlie Clements) wedding to Stacey Slater (Lacey Turner). Upon his arrival, Jack soaks Ronnie Mitchell (Samantha Womack) when driving through a puddle, so she soaks him with her water bottle. A fight with Max leads to Jack's wedding invitation being revoked, so he stays at The Queen Victoria public house and helps Ronnie's sister Roxy (Rita Simons) prepare for the reception. Deciding to stay, Jack comes between Ronnie and Roxy when he buys Scarlet Nightclub and offers Ronnie a partnership. Jack causes more disruption in the Mitchell family when he sets up Ronnie's cousin, Phil Mitchell (Steve McFadden), by taping him confessing to his part in Kevin Wicks' (Phil Daniels) death. Jack blackmails Phil with this, demanding the car lot for his silence, which he then rents to Pat Evans (Pam St Clement). Despite the Mitchells' animosity, Jack develops an attraction to Ronnie and a relationship starts. The other Mitchells, particularly Roxy, try to end the relationship. Jack's ex-wife, Selina, reappears briefly and they have sex, which Roxy discovers and she tells Ronnie, who is due to live with Jack. Ronnie ends the relationship. They reconcile, but Ronnie does not trust Jack and struggles to bond with his daughter, Penny. Jack and Roxy have sex while drunk. They agree to conceal this, but Roxy is pregnant and later gives birth to daughter Amy Mitchell (Amelie Conway).

Jack romances Tanya, who is now separated from Max. Jack supports Tanya and her children as they strive to cope after discovering Max's affair with Stacey and his departure. When Max returns, he is furious to discover that they are together. Max attempts to buy the family home but Jack outbids him, buying No. 5 Albert Square and sharing the residence with Tanya and the children. Max tries to break them up, but is unsuccessful. Max frames Jack, claiming Jack tried to kill him. Jack is arrested but soon released, due to his connections in the police force. In revenge, Jack takes Max hostage, beating and taunting him before abandoning him in an old warehouse. That night, Max is hit by a car and Jack is the main suspect. Max's daughter, Lauren, later confesses to her family, but Tanya tells the police she did it and is arrested. Tanya is forced to split from Jack. Jack demands a DNA test on Amy, Roxy's daughter. Reluctantly agreeing, Roxy assures him that her husband Sean Slater (Robert Kazinsky) is Amy's father. Jack concentrates on re-building his relationship with Ronnie, with whom he now shares a flat. However, Jack's sister, Suzy reveals the true result, that Jack is Amy's father. Furious, Sean snatches Amy and persuades Roxy to join him on a trip but Sean tries to kill them by driving into a frozen lake. Jack and Ronnie save Roxy and Amy. Roxy tells Jack that he will have no contact with Amy and Ronnie refuses to reconcile with him. Jack tries establishing regular contact with Amy, leading Ronnie to leave Walford. Racing to the airport to stop her, Jack tells Ronnie that he loves her over the airport tannoy. They return to Walford together and Roxy agrees not to interfere. Ronnie and Jack discuss the possibility of a baby but he refuses, telling her she needs to grieve for her deceased daughter, Danielle Jones (Lauren Crace). Jack asks Ronnie to marry him but catches her piercing condoms. They argue and Jack leaves, but finds Ronnie's ring on the table when he returns. After telling Jack that Ronnie has left Walford, Roxy tries seducing Jack but he pushes her away. When Ronnie returns, Jack begs her to reunite with him, but she refuses. A few weeks later, she asks him to buy her out of the nightclub and to fund this, Jack sells the car lot to Archie Mitchell (Larry Lamb), Ronnie and Roxy's father who Ronnie despises. This distances Ronnie further from Jack.

The feud between Jack and Phil recommences. Phil discovers that Jack is dealing drugs and when Shirley Carter (Linda Henry) buys drugs from one of his contacts, Phil forces Jack to buy them back. Humiliated, Jack employs Phil's sister Sam Mitchell (Danniella Westbrook), infuriating Phil. Despite knowing that she is engaged to Ricky Butcher (Sid Owen), Jack and Sam begin an affair. Archie intervenes and pays Jack to keep seeing Sam as part of his plan to take over The Queen Vic. He also tells Jack's niece and Ricky's ex-wife Bianca (Patsy Palmer) about the affair. Later, Bianca drags Sam into The Queen Vic by her hair and forces her to tell Ricky in front of Jack about the affair she was having. Jack is distraught as Roxy was about to give him Ronnie's address but when the affair is revealed, Roxy changes her mind and throws him out of the pub. Ronnie gets pregnant but she has a miscarriage when Archie pushes her against the bar in the pub during an argument. Jack comforts Ronnie and takes in Ronnie, Roxy and Amy when they are made homeless by Archie. Jack confronts Archie on Christmas Day 2009 and threatens to kill him if he hurts Ronnie again. Archie is murdered that day and an investigation begins. Four weeks later, Jack asks Ronnie to dinner, to which she agrees but not until after Archie's funeral. At the funeral, Jack offers DC Wayne Hughes (Jamie Treacher) to help with any "local information" he might need. He later sees Ronnie tearing up the flowers on Archie's grave and asks her why. She thinks he is accusing her of murder. She later sees him talking to DCI Jill Marsden (Sophie Stanton), who is investigating the murder. Ronnie asks Jack how he would feel if he knew she had killed Archie, leading him to suspect her and also tells him, despite Jack's desire, that starting a relationship with him again is not what she wants. At his great-niece Tiffany Butcher's (Maisie Smith) birthday party, he cuts his hand and Tiffany tells him that she saw Bradley washing blood off his hands on Christmas Day. Jack confronts Bradley who eventually reveals that he found out from Stacey on Christmas Day that Archie had raped and impregnated her, and Bradley punched Archie.

Jack urges Bradley to go to the police, saying that if he does not, Jack will. However, Max stops him and when DNA screening starts and Bradley gives a sample, Jack bribes Hughes to make the DNA samples disappear. Janine is arrested when someone plants Archie's mother's missing engagement ring in her flat and Jack hears from Hughes when she is being released. Jack offers Janine money to leave Walford and they accuse each other. He says that he did not set her up and Ryan Malloy (Neil McDermott) stops him from hurting Janine. Later, Jack receives another call from Hughes to say that someone has reported Bradley and he is about to be arrested. Jack tells Bradley he must leave Walford quickly, and says he will meet them soon and help them to go. However, Jack is delayed by police and when Bradley realises he has left his passport behind, he returns to the Square where police see him and chase him to the roof of The Queen Vic, where he stumbles and falls to his death. A distraught Stacey tells Max she killed Archie and then disappears afterwards, but Jack does not find out about this and tells Max at Bradley's funeral that the court has found Bradley posthumously guilty.

Jack begins a relationship with Chelsea Fox (Tiana Benjamin) after helping her escape from a blind date. He organises a party for his niece, Lauren, at R&R, where Kylie (Elarica Gallacher) attempts to shoot Jack's nephew Billie (Devon Anderson) but Jack is shot instead as he pushes Billie out of the way. Jack is taken to hospital, where doctors tell his family he may be left with severe brain damage. He is put in a medically-induced coma and undergoes an operation due to swelling on his brain, which is successful. When he is brought out of the coma, it is discovered that he is paralysed down the left side of his body but it is not clear whether it is periodic or permanent. Jack then breaks up with Chelsea and attempts to phone Ronnie, but she does not hear her phone ringing as she is spending time with Jack's consultant, Mr. Steele (Simon Wilson). He starts to feel helpless and wants to give up, but after Max refuses to help him, he puts his phone out of reach and manages to pull himself up with one arm. Meanwhile, Chelsea suspects she might be pregnant with Jack's child, and wants to keep the baby but is unsure about telling Jack. However, when she takes another test, she finds out she is not pregnant and Jack never finds out.

Max reveals to Jack that he saw Ronnie and Mr. Steele kissing, so Jack punches Mr. Steele out of jealousy. When Ronnie discovers this, she dumps Mr. Steele and rushes to see Jack, telling him that if he were to propose, she would not turn him down. Billie visits Jack to apologise, but Jack ignores his apology as it has taken him weeks to visit him, calling him cowardly. Billie leaves in tears and joins the army to make Jack proud of him. Ronnie visits again and is told that Jack was able to move his toe earlier. She thinks Jack needs better care, so decides to find him a place at a private clinic. Jack later hears from Max that there has been a fire at the club, and Ronnie tells him he is going to the clinic. However, she decides not to claim on the insurance to keep Billy Mitchell (Perry Fenwick) out of trouble. Roxy hears from Max that Ronnie has no money and is not claiming, so she decides to pay for Jack's treatment and he is moved to the private clinic. Jack makes decent progress and when Ronnie visits him, they end up having sex. A few days later, having been discharged from hospital, Jack turns up in The Queen Victoria for Ronnie's birthday. Later, when they return to his flat, Jack asks Ronnie to marry him and she accepts. When he finds out that Archie raped Ronnie when she was 13 years old, he finds it hard to believe at first because she would have known about it for several years without telling anybody, however, he tells Ronnie he does believe her and vows to not let anyone hurt her again. He becomes frustrated when his progress at physiotherapy slows down. He is determined to walk at his own wedding but Max says he never will, and makes him angry, goading him into getting out of his wheelchair.

Ronnie discovers that Sam is pregnant and tells Jack, asking if it could be his even though Sam insists it is Ricky's. After the baby is born, Sam admits she is unsure. Jack and Ronnie visit Sam and the baby in hospital. Even though Sam now says that baby Richard, is Ricky's, Bianca tells Jack he should see if Richard is his. He and Ronnie both agree and tell Sam, and Ricky agrees to a paternity test. Ronnie tells Jack whatever the result is, they will be okay. Sam reveals that the paternity test confirmed Ricky as the father. Ronnie and Jack are relieved and Ronnie reveals that she is pregnant with Jack's baby. However, a suspicious Bianca gets the paternity results for herself, and reveals that the father is actually Jack. Sam then tells them that Ronnie made her lie. Ronnie tells Jack she did not want to share him with anyone else, and Jack understands. Later, Sam visits Jack and Ronnie saying she cannot cope with the baby on her own, and asks them to have him. Ronnie and Jack agree but when they are due to meet, Sam does not turn up. Ronnie visits Sam and tells her to keep Richard but offers her money to leave Walford as when Jack finds out he will come looking for her. Ronnie returns to Jack but finds Sam has already dropped Richard off. Ronnie then meets Sam with cash and tells her to take Richard back but she will have to leave straight away. Sam leaves the next day.

Before Billie's birthday, he visits Jack, but Jack tells him to leave, however, he goes to Billie's party. Billie and Kylie's friend Connor Stanley (Arinze Kene) turns up and apologises to Jack on behalf of Kylie. Kylie is sentenced to 15 years in prison. The day before Jack and Ronnie's wedding, Jack helps Max take revenge on Harry Gold (Linal Haft) who is harassing his ex-wife Vanessa (Zöe Lucker), Max's girlfriend. They threaten Harry and tell him to stay away, but afterwards Jack is grabbed by two men and bundled into a car. The next day, nobody is able to find Jack but Max finds his phone. He drives Ronnie to the wedding and finds Jack in the boot of the wedding car, tied up and gagged. Max frees him and Jack and Ronnie get married. After, they leave for their honeymoon. After the honeymoon, Jack goes abroad on business and is unable to return to see Ronnie give birth to their son James. Before Jack returns, James dies due to cot death. Ronnie swaps their deceased baby with Alfie (Shane Richie) and Kat Moon's (Jessie Wallace) newborn baby, Tommy. Jack is introduced to Tommy as his own son, and bonds with him. However, he worries about Ronnie's state of mind when she struggles to cope. Jack sells his share in R&R and goes into business with Max at the car lot, renaming it Branning Brothers. He then meets Michael, Alfie's cousin who he knows from his youth, and invites him to stay but Ronnie finds out Michael is Tommy's real father and tells Jack to kick him out, which Jack eventually does. When Jack announces he and Michael are opening a boxing club, Ronnie is infuriated, so she lies that Michael came onto her. Jack punches Michael but Michael tells him that Ronnie is obsessed with him and has stolen a passport photo of him, which Jack later finds with Ronnie's things. He confronts her, but says is she does not know why she took it, but insists she does not want Michael near the baby. He quits the car lot to look after the boxing club full-time. He starts to worry about Ronnie's erratic behaviour. Eventually, she tells Jack that he is not the father, and hands Tommy back to Kat and Alfie. Tommy is taken into care and Jack says an emotional goodbye, while Ronnie is in police custody. Jack visits her in prison, but she tells him to forget he ever met her and find someone else. Jack goes into deep depression and begins drinking heavily. He meets Tanya's sister, Rainie Cross (Tanya Franks), in the club and they have a one-night stand; however, Jack throws Rainie out the following morning. Max tries to help him along with Carol but he brutally beats Max, however, they reconcile on Max's birthday. Jack discovers Ronnie has been released on bail and decides to forgive her, asking her to move back in.

On the day of Ronnie's hearing, Jack attempts to flee the country with her to Mexico. Michael frames her by taking Roxy's mobile and asking her to meet at the park. She finds Tommy alone and crying, and attempts to help him. Kat and Alfie then see Ronnie holding Tommy with disbelief, and after slapping her and getting Tommy back off her, Kat says that she will be laughing as Ronnie rots in jail. Later, Roxy finds out Michael did, in fact, frame Ronnie and he later admits this to her and Kat. At the hearing, Ronnie is sentenced to 3 years in prison, but Kat changes her mind and decides she does not want her to go to prison. Kat then runs over to Ronnie and says she forgives her, and that she agrees that they are the same. The two hold their hands to each other separated by the glass. Ronnie is then taken away, leaving Jack devastated. Jack continually tries to visit Ronnie in prison, but she refuses to see him. Michael taunts Jack by claiming he slept with Ronnie, and Jack beats him up in the toilets of The Queen Victoria. The fight is secretly witnessed by Michael's father Eddie Moon (David Essex) but he walks away as he thinks Michael set his stock on fire. Though Jack and Michael repair their friendship, Jack is dismayed when Michael organises an unlicensed boxing fight between his brother Tyler Moon (Tony Discipline) and a seemingly unbeatable and violent opponent, all as part of Michael's revenge on his father. Though Tyler wins the fight, he is hospitalised and the friendship between Jack and Michael is strained further.

Roxy goes on a night out with friends, leaving Ben Mitchell (Joshua Pascoe) babysitting Amy. When he leaves Amy alone for a while to get a DVD from Jack's flat, Amy runs herself a bath, gets in and almost drowns. When Ben finds her, Dr. Yusef Khan (Ace Bhatti) is called and revives her. When Jack arrives, he accompanies Amy to the hospital who is still in a critical condition. The next day, Roxy arrives and Jack accuses her of being neglectful. Jack then tells a social worker about Roxy's past and her family. After interviewing Roxy, the social worker awards temporary custody of Amy to Jack. He refuses to give Roxy access to Amy other than at pre-arranged times, and is annoyed when Abi allows Roxy to see Amy. When Abi tells Jack how her family is falling apart, Jack vows to bring Max back to Walford, as he left following the revelation of his affair with Tanya when she was married to Greg Jessop (Stefan Booth). Max returns to Walford with their brother, Derek. Jack is pleased to see Derek, but is concerned when it is revealed that Tanya has cervical cancer. The court decides to award custody of Amy to Jack, however Roxy vows to appeal the decision. When Phil receives a text message saying "I know you killed Kevin", Phil believes Jack is behind the message, so confronts him. Jack denies this, and when he goes to give Phil the recording, he finds it missing, along with a file on all of Phil's past misdemeanors. Phil continues to suspect Jack however, and has Jack's car crushed as a warning. In revenge, Jack prevents Roxy from seeing Amy. Roxy then tells Jack that Ronnie is filing for a divorce from him. On Christmas Day 2011, Jack sees Roxy taunting him into letting her see Amy after showing the toy she was going to give her, so he relents, knowing that he may not be able spend another Christmas with Ronnie.

Amy starts pinching and scratching other children at nursery, and Whitney Dean (Shona McGarty) tells Roxy and Jack about this. They later talk and agree to not argue in front of Amy. Roxy realises it is the first time they have spoken properly since Amy was born, and they start to compliment each other as parents, which leads to sex. They continue with the custody battle, and Roxy soon discovers that Jack forged her signature to get Amy a passport. Roxy threatens to report this, and Jack drops the case so Roxy gains custody of Amy. Derek then continues to urge Jack to use dirty tactics to get Amy back, but makes things worse by telling Jack lies. Eventually, Derek pays a friend to have Roxy killed, but this does not happen and Jack confronts Derek saying that anything that happens to Roxy also happens to Amy. When Jack apologises to Roxy, she punches him and says that he is an unfit parent, saying that Penny is proof of this. Jack agrees and tells Max that he will not allow what happened to Penny happen to Amy.

Denise Fox (Diane Parish) poaches the builder that Jack has hired. Jack argues with Denise, leading to her barring him from the Minute Mart. He later accidentally soaks her with water while washing his car. Jack then agrees to go on a blind date set up by Tanya and Zainab Masood (Nina Wadia), but is horrified when he discovers it is with Denise. After the pair throw insults at one another, Denise throws water in his face and storms out. Jack later expresses his attraction to Sharon Watts (Letitia Dean), who has jilted her fiancé John Hewland (Jesse Birdsall). They flirt and, when Sharon is desperate for money, he buys her engagement ring. Sharon decides to stay at the B&B, but Jack invites her to stay at his flat, where they have sex. Sharon constantly seduces him afterwards and on Sharon's terms, knowing about her addiction to painkillers, they start dating. However, their relationship starts to shake when Sharon agrees to a plan in order to gain custody of Lola Pearce's (Danielle Harold) baby, pretending to be Phil's fiancée, which makes Jack jealous; however, the lie becomes too much for Phil, so Sharon stops playing the part. Jack and the rest of his family fall out with Derek, and when he suffers a heart attack on Christmas Day, he, along with Max, Kat and Derek's son Joey (David Witts), do nothing to help him as he suffers. Jack tries to pull the group together in hiding this from the police. Phil jaunts the fact to Jack that he is still in love with Sharon on New Year's Eve, prompting a paranoid Jack to propose to her in an argument. However, on the same night, Phil proposes also, but Sharon says yes to Jack. However, he is still unnerved by Phil and sees him an opponent for his lover. When Sharon's son, Dennis Rickman Jr (Harry Hickles) starts a fight at school, Jack admits he taught Denny to box, angering Sharon. Jack receives a letter from Ronnie saying she is due to be released from prison. He visits Ronnie in secret and realises he will never love Sharon like he loved Ronnie, so he jilts her moments before they are due to marry, and leaves Walford for a while.

When he returns, he is stunned to discover that Sharon is now with Phil. Michael is not happy when he sees Jack, saying that he has found it hard to cope with a business on his own and a child on his own. Eventually, Jack sells his share of the boxing gym to Michael's estranged wife Janine Butcher (Charlie Brooks), and runs the car lot with Max, angering Michael. When Max is put in prison, having been set up by Carl White (Daniel Coonan), Jack supports the rest of the Brannings. Ronnie is released from prison and returns to Walford, though Jack initially refuses to speak to her. Eventually they have an emotional conversation about their baby and reunite with a romantic kiss. She then moves back in with him, angering Phil, who forces her to choose between Jack and her family. She chooses Jack, and Jack buys an engagement ring, but when she tells him she does not want another baby, fearing going through the pain of losing James again, he breaks up with her. Jack soon realises that he will never be able to get over his past with Ronnie as long as he stays in Walford, so he leaves for France to reconnect with his daughter Penny. Ronnie shares a tender goodbye with him before watching him leave Walford in his car.

=== 2015–present ===
Jack returns to visit Dot and Amy for Christmas in December 2015. Ronnie is initially annoyed but later kisses him. He then finds out she tried to have Vincent Hubbard (Richard Blackwood) killed but admits he has missed her and they reignite their relationship. At Mick Carter's (Danny Dyer) stag party, he and Mick kiss as part of a dare. Mick later tells Jack that Roxy's fiancé Dean Wicks (Matt Di Angelo) raped his wife, Linda Carter (Kellie Bright). Jack removes Amy from Roxy's care and warns Roxy that Dean is controlling her. She later realises that he is right, so she ends her relationship with Dean. Jack is furious that Ronnie did not tell him about Dean's history, but reconciles with her while helping Billy propose to his former wife Honey Mitchell (Emma Barton), and Jack decides to stay in Walford for Ronnie. When Roxy arrives at Ronnie's house desperate for her help after Dean attempts to rape her, Jack, unaware of Roxy's ordeal, persuades Ronnie not to answer the door. Roxy leaves without Amy when she returns from the police station. Before leaving, she has a conversation with Ronnie, leading to Ronnie telling Jack that she needs a break and they cannot love each other again as she is broken and he leaves with Amy, promising her they will return to Walford soon.

Jack returns when Honey calls him, but when Ronnie sees him, she runs away. As Jack leaves, Ronnie gets in his taxi and they kiss. Ronnie and Jack admit their feelings for each other, but when Ronnie is unable to commit, Jack decides to leave again and is collected by Delphine Rousseau (Emmanuelle Bouaziz). After seeing something on social media, Ronnie believes that Jack and Delphine are getting married and rushes to the venue to stop it. When Ronnie enters the hall, Jack is a guest at Delphine's wedding. Ronnie and Jack then have passionate sex in the shower. Later, Delphine tells Ronnie not to break Jack's heart, so Ronnie leaves. However, Jack goes to Walford and tells Ronnie that he wants to spend his life with her and they kiss. Jack returns to France, but comes back when he buys Max's old house, intending to convert it into apartments. Jack then discovers that Ronnie killed Carl White (Daniel Coonan) and is angry until she explains it was in self-defence. Jack and Ronnie are later confused when undertaker Les Coker (Roger Sloman) reveals that he has received an email informing him that Ronnie has died, which unnerves Jack but does not worry Ronnie. Jack believes that Hannah Reynolds (Mia Jenkins) is responsible, and she is arrested. Jack becomes good friends with one of his builders Andy Flynn (Jack Derges) and when he discovers that he has nowhere to live, Jack and Ronnie allow him to move in with them. However, it is later revealed that Andy is responsible for the email and is stalking Ronnie in revenge for Danielle, his adoptive sister. This is later revealed and Jack punches Andy, and after apologising to Ronnie and revealing that he grew to like her, Andy leaves Walford.

When Roxy begins dealing drugs, Jack refuses to let her near Amy. Jack finally agrees for Roxy to see Amy, however, Amy goes missing the same time that Roxy's drugs are missing. It is assumed that Amy has taken the drugs but in hospital Amy reveals that she has not. Jack decides to file for full custody of Amy, devastating Roxy. When Sam returns to Walford with their son Ricky (Henri Charles), Jack refuses to have anything to do with him. However, at Peggy Mitchell's (Barbara Windsor) funeral, Jack decides to see Ricky and they bond. Deciding that he is better off without her, Sam abandons Ricky at Jack's house and goes back to Portugal. Jack and Ricky struggle to get along, with Jack trying to put an end to Ricky's bad habits of constantly playing games and eating sweets, but their relationship soon improves. Jack and Ricky then join the local scouts club together.

After a child dies after being stabbed near Amy and Ricky's school, Jack decides that he and Ronnie should move away with the children to Essex. This upsets Roxy as Amy would be moving with them. Ronnie agrees to the move but tells Jack they cannot move without Roxy's consent. Roxy is disgusted when she hears of Jack's plan to sell the house she owns with Ronnie, but Jack promises that she will get half of the money they get. Roxy then agrees to let Ronnie and Jack move. However, when Roxy is reminded of Jack's old philandering ways, she becomes suspicious of him and Honey. She informs Ronnie, who confronts Jack. Furious, Jack declares that he and Ronnie cannot have a new life with Roxy being a part of it. Realising that Ronnie and Jack can give Amy the life she deserves, Roxy says that Ronnie and Jack can move to Ongar alone. Jack is surprised when Max returns to Walford. He questions his motives and tells him to stay away from his wedding but later makes peace with Max and allows him to attend. Jack and Ronnie visit James's grave and proceed to the wedding venue. Ronnie runs out and Jack is furious to find out that Ronnie has allowed Roxy to move to Ongar with them. However, realising Ronnie needs her sister, he accepts this. Jack and Ronnie marry. At the end of the night, Amy and Ricky ask him to read them a story, and while he is doing so, a drunk Ronnie and Roxy drown in the hotel swimming pool after Ronnie attempts to rescue Roxy but is weighed down by her wedding dress. The next day, Jack is informed of the deaths and is heartbroken. He insists he does not want the children to know, but Max tries to convince him that he should tell them. Jack's police liaison officer tells Jack that CCTV shows Ronnie going into the pool after Roxy, so Jack assumes this means that Roxy dragged Ronnie under. Jack and his devastated mother-in-law, Glenda Mitchell (Glynis Barber), identify the bodies. Later, when Amy and Ricky ask where Ronnie and Roxy are, Jack says that they have "gone away" and will never come back, leaving them confused. They question Jack and Max about Ronnie and Roxy, so Jack's stepmother, Dot Branning (June Brown), explains to them with sensitivity that they are "God's angels" and are watching them in heaven. Frustrated with everyone taking pity on him and struggling to cope with Ronnie's death, Jack announces that, after the funeral, he will move to Ongar with the children. Jack is informed by the liaison officer that the coroner's report reveals Roxy suffered a cardiac arrest in the pool from which he concludes that cocaine contributed to her death, so he blames her for Ronnie's death. After Ronnie and Roxy's funerals, Glenda tells Jack she intends to take custody of Matthew. Her son Danny Mitchell (Liam Bergin) tries to bribe Jack in return for changing her mind, but Jack beats him up. Glenda tells Jack she is not doing it for financial gain. Realising that Glenda is being sincere and that he needs help, Jack asks Glenda to move in with him. An inquest rules that Ronnie and Roxy's deaths were due to misadventure and drugs in Roxy's system did not contribute, but Jack still blames Roxy for Ronnie's death. Jack is angered when Glenda gets Amy's ears pierced and throws Glenda out but later realises her intentions were good and agrees to still let her be part of Amy, Ricky and Matthew's lives. He refuses to commemorate Roxy with a headstone but reconsiders when Stacey reminds him that it is only punishing her family and Amy.

Several months later, Jack decides he needs to move on with his life, but still struggles to cope. Max makes contact with Matthew's father, Charlie Cotton (Declan Bennett), and he returns the next day, telling Jack that they need to talk about Matthew. Jack is reluctant to let Charlie spend time with Matthew as Matthew does not know him. However, Max convinces him otherwise. Unbeknownst to Jack, Max and Charlie are secretly plotting against him. When Dot lets Jack know of Charlie's plan to return to Ireland with Matthew, Jack is infuriated. He declares that Charlie will never get custody of Matthew as this would mean breaking his promise to Ronnie. When Charlie says that Ronnie got what she deserved, Jack punches Charlie, only to be stopped by Max who tells Jack he may have lost his chances of keeping Matthew. Max is later disappointed when he learns from Jack's solicitor that Jack still has a strong chance of keeping Matthew, despite his fight with Charlie. Max visits Charlie and later, Jack is arrested for assaulting Charlie, though unbeknownst to Jack, Max has attacked Charlie to make his injuries worse and allowed Jack to take the blame. However, the charges against Jack are dropped. Charlie's wife, Liz Cotton (Michelle Connolly), speaks to Jack and Jack realises what is best for Matthew and gives Charlie residence of Matthew. Charlie promises that Jack can still see Matthew, though Jack is unaware that Max has paid Charlie to not contact Jack again.

Realising he cannot cope with looking after Amy and Ricky as a single parent, Jack later hires Ingrid Solberg (Pernille Broch) to be their nanny. However, after she shows repeated lateness, Jack offers her to move in with him and when the children start to like her, they decide to go camping together with Honey and her children, Janet (Grace) and Will (Freddie Phillips). When Jack is reminded that this is the first family trip without Ronnie, Ingrid comforts him telling him that he is venting his grief to the people he cares about. When their chemistry begins to grow, Jack and Ingrid share a passionate kiss which he instantly begins to regret. However they later decide to remain friends and Ingrid continues to look after Amy and Ricky. When the residents learn that Max has been involved in a redevelopment plan of Albert Square with James Willmott-Brown (William Boyde), Jack supports him and discovers Max is self-harming. Jack, Lauren and Abi confront Max about the redevelopment plan where he reveals that his motive was for revenge, as everyone had abandoned him when he went to prison. Max then breaks all of Jack's family photos and tells him that their family is worth nothing. Despite this, Jack refuses to give up on Max. However, Charlie returns to Walford with Matthew and exposes the full extent of Max's betrayal to Jack. Jack is heartbroken when he learns that Max paid Charlie to take Matthew away from him and he also disowns Max, telling him that he is a lost cause and can never change. However, on the anniversary of Ronnie's death, Jack and Max reunite when Jack comforts Max when he breaks down due to Abi being critically ill. Following Abi's funeral, Jack tries to woo Mel Owen (Tamzin Outhwaite) after she returns to Walford and rents a sports car, which initially impresses her but her son, Hunter Owen (Charlie Winter) sabotages the car so it will not start, fearing that Jack would replace his late father Steve Owen (Martin Kemp). Despite Hunter's attempts to stop it, Mel eventually starts a relationship with Jack.

Jack proposes marriage to Mel, however, before she can respond, they are interrupted by Mel's estranged husband Ray Kelly (Sean Mahon). Jack comforts Rainie and they have sex. Jack tells Rainie to keep it a secret from Max, but they kiss again and realise that Amy has spotted them together. Jack panics over whether Amy is aware of their fling, and they are unaware that she has videoed them kissing. Jack becomes suspicious of Ray and his suspicions intensify when he notices that Jeff Reynolds (Andres Williams) is afraid of Ray. Jack shares his doubts with Mel, however, Ray manages to charm her and turn her against Jack. Ray confronts Jack and threatens to expose his past as a police officer and the events that led to Penny becoming paralyzed if he doesn't stay away from Mel. Rainie's mother Cora Cross (Ann Mitchell) returns and reveals Jack and Rainie's liaison to Max, who confronts Jack and attacks him. In February 2019, Ray's corpse is discovered in Walford Common. Jack witnesses Mel being taken in for questioning and realises that Mel has used him as her alibi on the night of Ray's disappearance. Despite being reluctant, Jack gives Mel a false alibi and demands to know the truth. Mel reveals that Hunter shot Ray in a desperate attempt to stop him from strangling her. Jack tells Mel to report it to the police, but she pleads with him to help her and Hunter flee Walford. Jack agrees to help them escape, but tips off the police about Mel's plans to flee the country with Hunter, leading to his arrest. Mel cannot forgive Jack, and he leaves to visit Penny in France.

When Amy goes missing, Jack is devastated. He later discovers that Sean has taken her in hopes of a reconciliation with Roxy. Jack is furious and takes him to Ronnie and Roxy's grave. Sean is infuriated when Jack blames Roxy for Ronnie's death and they end up fighting. In May 2019, Jack becomes close to resident Denise Fox (Diane Parish) and Mick attempts to play match-maker by pushing Jack towards Denise. They go on a date and agree to start dating. Jack's happiness is short-lived when he beats up drug dealer Fraser Shelton (Shanu Hazzan) when he finds out that he has raped his grand-niece Tiffany Butcher (Maisie Smith). Jack is tipped off by one of his friends in the police, Muski, that there is a warrant out to arrest him, and he asks Denise to provide him with an alibi. When Jack refuses to tell her the truth, Denise briefly ends the relationship. Jack confides in Max about what he has done, and Max suggests that Jack runs away, but he is later arrested. Despite facing charges for grievous bodily harm, Jack is released. He later decides to rejoin the police. When Hunter escapes from prison, he decides to take revenge on Jack for reporting him to the police. He sneaks into Jack's house with a gun aiming to shoot him but instead attacks Denise when she sees him. He finds Jack at The Queen Vic and holds him at gunpoint, attempting to use him as a shield to escape. His plan spirals out of control and leads to Ben Mitchell (Max Bowden) getting shot. Phil Mitchell (Steve McFadden) and Jack's feud is reignited in December 2019, when Phil becomes convinced that Sharon is having an affair. When he sees Sharon and Jack together, along with her necklace in his house, Phil believes that Sharon is cheating on him with Jack. Phil decides to get revenge by beating Jack and threatening to shoot him. Jack begs for his life and persuades Phil that he has moved on from Sharon. His relationship with Denise develops further and the pair are happily together for several years, and marry on Christmas Day 2021.

In April 2022, Jack is surprised to see Ricky's (now Frankie Day) mother Sam (now Kim Medcalf) back in Walford. Sam tells him it is just a short business visit. She decides she needs Jack’s help and threatens to take Ricky back with her to Spain, if Jack does not help her to scare away her adversary Jonah Tyler (Mark Mooney). Jack reluctantly agrees and lets Sam move in with him and Denise when she has nowhere to go. Sam continuously winds up Denise, and also conspires with Phil to blackmail Denise into giving her £50,000 to buy Ruby Allen's (Louisa Lytton) nightclub – threatening to tell the police that Denise knew the truth about Vincent's death if she does not give her back the money Phil paid, to open her salon "Fox & Hair". Denise reluctantly agrees, but throws Sam out. Later in the year, Jack discovers that Amy (now Ellie Dadd) has a new boyfriend, Denzel Danes (Jaden Ladega) whom he dislikes. Jack is at risk of losing his job when he sees Denzel and Amy kissing and Jack pins Denzel against a wall in a fit of rage, however he keeps his job. Denzel takes revenge on Jack when he videos Sam kissing Jack, although he instantly rejects her, Denzel sends the video to Denise although she realises that Jack did not make any advances and soon forgives him.

In January 2023, it is revealed that twelve-year-old Lily Slater (Lillia Turner) has fallen pregnant and she names Jack and Sam’s son Ricky as the father following a one-night stand. Amidst the situation, Amy also begins self-harming. Struggling with the pressures of his family and professional life, Jack becomes more and more volatile, constantly shouting at his family members and neglecting Denise, which drives her in to the arms of Ravi Gulati (Aaron Thiara). Jack then starts his own "on/off" affair with Stacey just before, unbeknownst to Jack, on Christmas Day, 2023, Denise and Stacey are two of five women who witness Linda murder Keanu Taylor (Danny Walters) to save Sharon's life, later burying him in the café. The murder causes Denise to have a mental breakdown and be committed to a special facility, and, Jack slowly deduces that something is strange about Keanu's disappearance. On Denise's release, the couple are reconciled but, when Martin Fowler (James Bye) catches Jack kissing Stacey at a family barbecue, a major confrontation ends up with the men brawling and Denise leaving with Chelsea (now Zaraah Abrahams).

In April 2024, Keanu's tomb collapses. Jack catches Stacey and Denise digging up the tomb as Denise's necklace is trapped underneath, which implicates her in the murder. After Denise confesses to Jack the truth about Keanu's death, Jack decides to show his loyalty to Denise by retrieving the necklace himself; he is successful in this and flees just as Keanu's sister Bernadette Taylor (Clair Norris) discovers the body. Jack subsequently assists The Six as they frame Dean Wicks (Matt Di Angelo) for the crime and convinces his colleague Callum Highway (Tony Clay) to not further investigate the case when Dean alleges he is being framed.

In August 2024, Amy is severely injured during a crush at Peggy's Nightclub; Jack blames Penny (now Kitty Castledine) whilst it is in fact Chelsea who is responsible, which Denise later discovers. Jack and Denise become closer as they care for Amy and the two have sex, after which Denise reveals to the Brannings that Chelsea caused the crush. Fearing that Chelsea will be separated from her son Jordan Fox if the truth is revealed, Jack convinces a majority of the family that Penny should instead take the blame for the offence. Enraged, Penny swears revenge and convinces Denise to not reconcile with Jack. After this, she and Harry Mitchell (Elijah Holloway) use a video of Jack punching Harry to blackmail Jack in assisting Harry in his stolen car business.

In November 2024, Jack becomes desperate to escape Harry's threats. Upon discovering that Harry may be responsible for the disappearance of his ex-girlfriend, Jack has Harry arrested for her murder; he is released when his mother Nicola Mitchell (Laura Doddington) provides him with a false alibi. As revenge, Harry and Nicola send the video to the police; Jack is subsequently suspended from the force, pending an investigation. Jack and Denise get back together in February 2025.

On 27 May 2026 Denise is diagnosed with AML. To add to Jack's worries, he thinks Amy is behaving irresponsibly. He is unaware that Amy is in danger from and being groomed by his former colleague Craig Ingram (Matthew James-Bailey).

== Reception ==
Much media response to the character has centred around Maslen's good looks, with the Daily Express commenting: "At last. Someone remotely attractive comes to Albert Square." The Mirror similarly referred to him as "the new hunk on the Square", as well as "the hottest property on EastEnders". Inside Soap praised Maslen's transition between roles, declaring his performance as Jack to be "flawless". However, The Times were more critical, writing of 2007's New Year's Eve episode: "The alleged erotic tension between Ronnie Mitchell (Samantha Womack) and Jack Branning (Scott Maslen) was so underplayed as to be invisible." A reporter writing for the Inside Soap Yearbook 2017 (released in November 2016) described Jack's return as "a great arrival", before adding that he "made a very attractive birthday gift for Walford's Ronnie".

Maslen was nominated for 'Best Actor' at the 2011 Inside Soap Awards. In August 2017, Maslen was longlisted for Best Actor at the Inside Soap Awards. He did not progress to the viewer-voted shortlist.

Scenes broadcast on 3 January 2017, in which Jack struggles to tell Amy and Ricky that Ronnie and Roxy have died, were praised by bereaved children's charity Grief Encounter. A spokesperson for the charity said, "We are very thankful that such a high profile TV show has chosen to bring such a relevant issue to the forefront. Children's grief is normally a taboo subject, which needs to be talked about openly. EastEnders has handled the subject with an honest outlook, in that so many parents don't know how to tell their children the truth." The charity's founder, Dr Shelley Gilbert, said the storyline was "so important to highlight the real struggle parents have when telling their young children that mummy or daddy has died" and said that Jack was having a "very real response in not knowing when and how to tell the children".

In 2020, Sara Wallis and Ian Hyland from The Daily Mirror placed Jack 44th on their ranked list of the best EastEnders characters of all time, calling him a "ladies man" and commenting that he "has been hailed one of the Square’s hottest properties since 2007. Lock up your daughters."
