= Lauren Branning =

Fictional character from EastEnders

- EastEnders character
- Jacqueline Jossa as Lauren Branning (2024)
- Portrayed by: Madeline Duggan (2006–2010); Jacqueline Jossa (2010–present)
- Duration: 2006–2018, 2022–present
- First appearance: Episode 3180; 3 July 2006
- Created by: Simon Ashdown
- Introduced by: Kate Harwood (2006); Bryan Kirkwood (2010); Chris Clenshaw (2022–2024)
- Spin-off appearances: Lauren's Diaries (2010–2012); EastEnders: E20 (2010–2011)
In-universe information
- Other names: Lauren Beale
- Occupation: Student; Market trader Beautician; Company director Waitress; Website designer Car saleswoman
- Family: Branning/Beale
- Father: Max Branning
- Mother: Tanya Branning
- Stepfather: Greg Jessop
- Stepmother: Kirsty Branning; Rainie Cross; Cindy Beale
- Brothers: Oscar Branning
- Sisters: Abi Branning
- Half-brothers: Bradley Branning
- Half-sisters: Annie Carter
- Husband: Peter Beale (2025–present)
- Sons: Louie Beale; Jimmy Beale
- Grandfathers: Jim Branning; Bill Cross
- Grandmothers: Reenie Branning; Cora Cross
- Uncles: Derek Branning; Jack Branning
- Aunts: Carol Jackson; Suzy Branning; April Branning; Rainie Cross; Ava Hartman
- Nieces: AJ Branning
- First cousins: Joey Branning; Alice Branning; Bianca Jackson; Robbie Jackson; Sonia Fowler; Billie Jackson; Penny Branning; Amy Mitchell; Ricky Branning; James Branning; Kevin; Rebecca; Dexter Hartman; Roland Highway (adoptive)
- Other relatives: Liam Butcher; Tiffany Butcher; Morgan Butcher; Bex Fowler; Julia Fowler; Sami Jackson; Charli Slater; Ethan Branning-Panesar

Lauren Branning (also Beale) is a fictional character from the BBC soap opera EastEnders. The role was originally portrayed by Madeline Duggan from 3 July 2006 until her exit on 23 June 2010. Three months later on 27 September 2010, the role was recast to Jacqueline Jossa. In September 2017, it was announced that Jossa had been axed with the character departing on 16 February 2018. Jossa reprised the role temporarily in December 2022 and June 2023, before returning permanently on 1 January 2024.

Her storylines during her original stint have included running over her father Max Branning (Jake Wood), alcoholism, supporting her mother Tanya Branning (Jo Joyner) through cervical cancer, her friendships with Lucy Beale (Melissa Suffield/Hetti Bywater) and Whitney Dean (Shona McGarty), a sexual relationship with her first cousin Joey Branning (David Witts), an affair with a married alcoholic Jake Stone (Jamie Lomas), engagement to Peter Beale (Ben Hardy), struggling to deal with Lucy's murder, giving birth to Peter's son Louie Beale, a relationship with Peter's half-brother Steven Beale (Aaron Sidwell) following the ending of her relationship with Peter, becoming attracted to Max's boss Josh Hemmings (Eddie Eyre) who also becomes her own boss, having an abortion after becoming pregnant by Steven, dealing with his death, finding out her sister Abi is pregnant by Steven after an affair, working against Weylands plans for development on Albert Square, falling from the Queen Victoria roof alongside Abi and dealing with Abi's death following the fall.

Since her return in 2024, Lauren's storylines have included being framed for drug trafficking by Penny, reuniting with Peter, clashing with Peter's mother Cindy Beale (Michelle Collins), sleeping with Whitney's fiancée Zack Hudson (James Farrar), being injured during a crowd crush and stampede, falling pregnant by Peter again, battling a painkiller addiction, exposing Cindy's adultery with her ex-husband's estranged son Junior Knight (Micah Balfour), being a suspect in the "Who Attacked Cindy?" storyline, giving birth to second son Jimmy Beale with Cindy's help, finding out that Jimmy has coloboma and is severely sight-impaired, marrying Peter, dealing with the return of her estranged father, Max, and becoming involved in criminal activities with Peter's cousin Mark Fowler Jnr (Stephen Aaron-Sipple), with whom she later begins an affair.

== Creation and development ==
=== Casting and characterisation ===
"Intelligent, clever and a deep romantic, Lauren has it all. Like her mum, she is a quick judge of character but can also be sardonic, cynical and dry, just like her dad."

— The BBC describes Lauren played by Jossa (2010)

Lauren is described by the BBC website as an "outsider" and "doesn't care what people think". It continues: "Lauren is very quick on the uptake and picks up on everything going on around her but knows it doesn't pay to have loose lips. She's learnt the hard way that secrets destroy people. And this has made her vulnerable."

Lauren Branning was introduced in 2006 by executive producer Kate Harwood. She and her immediate family—father Max (Jake Wood), mother Tanya Branning (Jo Joyner) and sister Abi (Lorna Fitzgerald)—are an extension of the popular and long-running Jackson/Branning clan, who have appeared in the series since 1993. It was announced in May 2006 that Lauren would be played by actress Madeline Duggan. Duggan was replaced by Jacqueline Jossa, with Duggan's final scenes airing on 23 June 2010.

=== Recast ===
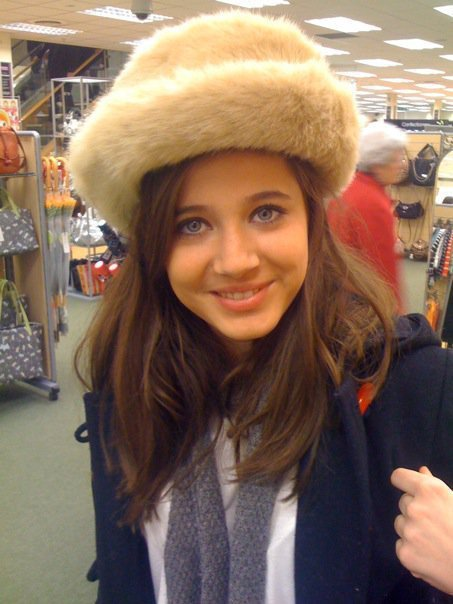
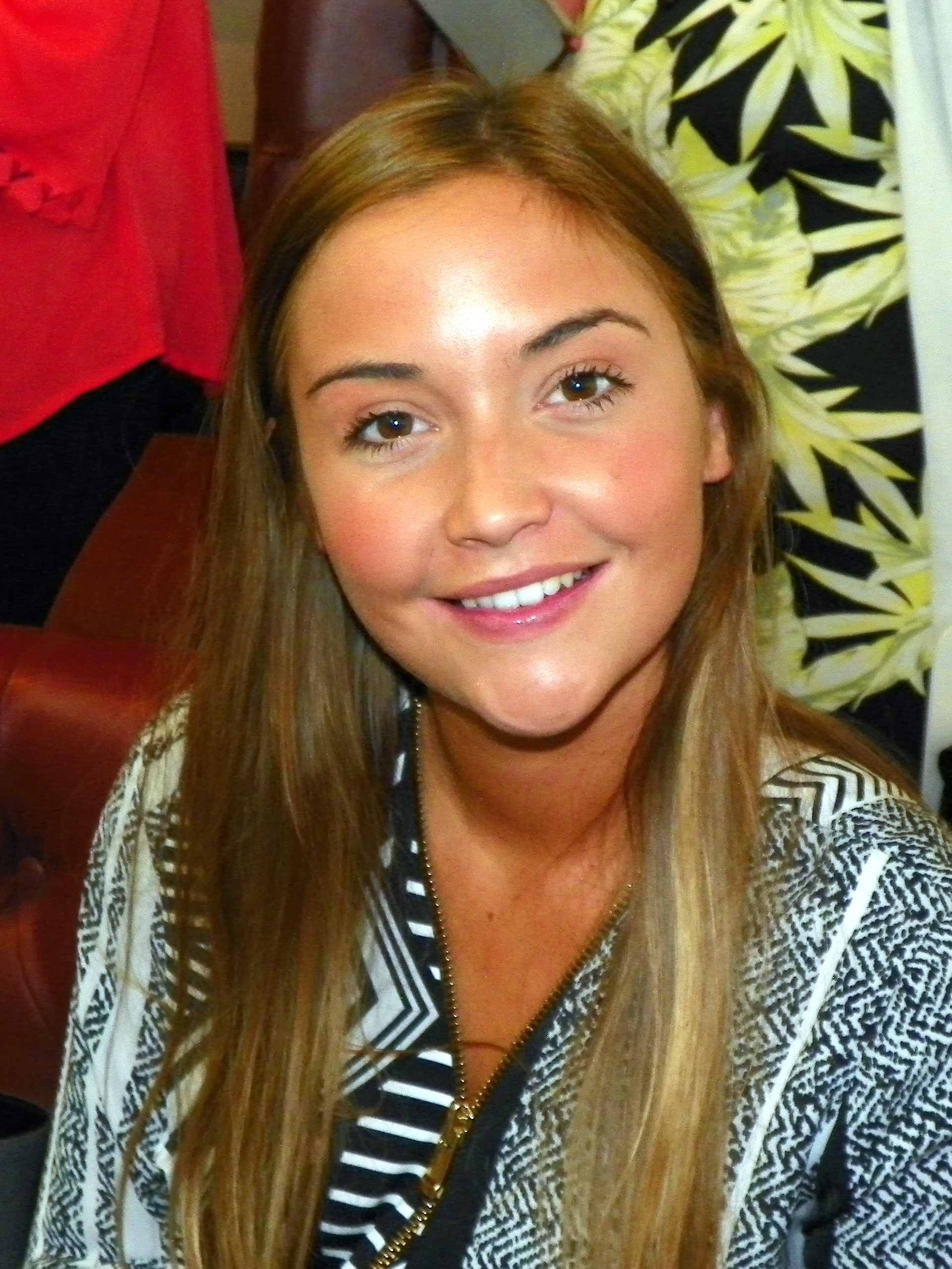
Lauren was originally played by Madeline Duggan (left) until 2010, and by Jacqueline Jossa (right) since 2010. Duggan was described as "a pretty lass, but pretty unimpressive".

On 9 May 2010 it was announced that Duggan had been axed from the soap by executive producer Bryan Kirkwood and that she had already filmed her exit scenes. Her final episode was broadcast on 23 June 2010. In August 2010, it was announced that the character would be returning later in the year, now played by Jacqueline Jossa. Of her casting in the show, Jossa said "I was so excited when I got the call to say I'd got the part in EastEnders. I've always been a massive fan of the show and it's a dream come true. The character of Lauren Branning will be really fun to play and there are some exciting things coming up". Kirkwood said "I'm delighted to welcome Jacqueline Jossa to Albert Square. Jacqueline's portrayal of Lauren has all the classic Branning qualities of toughness, cynicism and sensitivity. Jacqueline is set to be at the heart of Walford drama for some time to come". It was reported that Lauren's return would show a more grown-up side to the character, who will cause trouble but also show a softer side as she attempts to find love.

Jossa's first appearance was on 27 September 2010. Jossa said that when she first got the part of Lauren, she "worried unnecessarily". Talking to PA, Jossa said that working with Joyner and Wood was not as scary as she thought. She commented: "There was less pressure than I thought there was going to be. When I first started I got really scared and worked up, thinking everyone's going to hate me. They've been there four years and then I'm coming in to be their daughter – it was a bit surreal. And then two weeks later I felt completely comfortable, everyone was cracking jokes and I thought, 'Oh... I built it up a bit!'"

=== Storyline development ===
Lauren's primary storylines concerned a school girl romance with Peter Beale (Thomas Law), a friendship with the delinquent Lucy Beale (Melissa Suffield), and being caught in the middle of her warring parents, who separated in the serial in 2007 when Tanya discovered Max was cheating on her with Stacey Slater (Lacey Turner), Lauren's half brother Bradley's wife. In the storyline, Lauren played an integral part in the discovery of the affair; as a result of a practical joke, Lauren unwittingly recorded Max and Stacey kissing on video camera, and sent the recording to Bradley as a Christmas present in December 2007 as means of revenge on her father. Despite a change of heart, the recording was seen by the entire Branning family on Christmas Day, an episode that drew 13.9 million viewers, 55.3% of the total audience share.

The character became involved in one of EastEnders' most controversial storylines in 2008, when she was groomed by a paedophile, Tony King (Chris Coghill). Tony King had been introduced in September 2008 as the fiancé of Lauren's cousin Bianca Jackson (Patsy Palmer). However, in a plot twist, it was revealed that Tony was already in a sexual relationship with Bianca's 15-year-old stepdaughter Whitney Dean (Shona McGarty). After losing interest in Whitney, Tony turns his attentions to 14-year-old Lauren. An insider said: "He has got away with abusing Whitney for years but it seems one young girl isn't enough."

In April 2011, it was announced that Lauren is to have a relationship with already established character, Ryan Malloy. An EastEnders insider commented: "Sparks will fly when Ryan and Lauren begin their relationship. Max is certainly someone not to mess with. He's already very protective of his daughters and Ryan isn't exactly his favourite person after his relationship with Stacey, who Max will always hold a torch for."

Jossa explained that upon Lauren finding out about Tanya's cancer, viewers see a different side to Lauren. She told Inside Soap: "Immediately, there's a change in her – with Tanya so sick, Lauren has to grow up. You'd expect her to dive into the drink again or something like that, but she's right there for Tanya from the minute she finds out what's going on." She continues: "Tanya is still convinced she'll be fine, but then she finds out that the cancer has begun to spread. Tanya's really vulnerable at that point and it's Lauren who's saying, 'We're going to fix this and everything will be fine'. She's there for her mum the whole time – shopping, cooking, cleaning, looking after Abi and Oscar. She really wants to help Tanya and actually enjoys the responsibility."

=== Alcoholism ===
In January 2012, Jossa praised her storyline in which Lauren starts binge drinking due to the stress of her mother suffering from cancer. Jossa commented on the storyline saying that teenagers should take binge drinking more seriously. She said: "It's good EastEnders have done the storyline. It highlights that teenagers who people label irresponsible could be doing it to deal with worries they are keeping to themselves. What they actually need is help or someone to talk to. At first to Lauren drinking was a laugh. Then it became a way of forgetting – she has carried the burden of keeping her mum's illness secret." Speaking about Lauren's love life, Jossa added: "I always want Lauren and Fatboy to get together. They would make such a cute couple."

Jossa predicted in November 2012 that Lauren will revert to her old ways after her latest relationship break-up. When asked if Lauren would start drinking again, Jossa said that Lauren did not really stop and that alcohol is her "comfort blanket". Executive Producer Lorraine Newman said that Lauren's binge drinking will "come to a head" in Spring 2013. Newman commented "Lauren's obviously very troubled. A huge amount of what we're seeing now is to do with what's been going on with her parents for such a long time. It's a tough one covering the issue of binge drinking because inevitably, in order for it to have sufficient impact, it has to go on for a considerable amount of time. There's a real danger that it will become unpalatable and that you won't have too much empathy for the character." Newman also added that the binge drinking storyline will come to a conclusion in 2013.

In March 2013, it was revealed that Lauren is to have her drink spiked by her friend Lucy Beale. Lauren gave up her binge drinking to save her relationship with Joey but Lucy cannot stand seeing them happy together and decides she wants Joey back after a brief fling. Lucy spikes Lauren's drink and Lauren becomes extremely drunk and makes a fool of herself. Joey dumps Lauren as he thinks she has drinking behind her back and Lauren's life spirals out of control. An insider told the Daily Star, "It's going to be emotional to watch Lauren go through it all again as she's already been through so many battles with the bottle." Hetti Bywater said that she will continue her scheming until she gets Joey back.

=== Relationship with Joey Branning ===
In September 2012, Alison Rowley of Digital Spy said that Lauren will fall in love with her cousin Joey Branning (David Witts). An EastEnders insider told the Daily Star that it will be a huge storyline across the autumn. The insider said "Lauren hits the booze and shows her vulnerable side to Joey. He's there for her and feels very protective. The more time they spend together the more they start to realise their feelings for each other are not just that of cousins." As the chemistry between the pair intensifies, they try to hide the relationship from their parents. The insider said that it is a powerful force and that the attraction between them is so strong that it will take something huge to "stop them jumping into bed". Daniel Kilkelly later revealed that Lauren and Joey will be in a "horrifying" car crash. Filming for scenes begun on 10 September and is thought that the on-location filming will continue through the week. The details of the storyline are being kept under wraps but Digital Spy reports that Lauren will joyride her uncle Derek Branning's (Jamie Foreman) car but it goes horribly wrong and their lives are left hanging in the balance when Lauren loses control of the car and goes through a shop window. An insider commented "Everyone is really excited about these scenes. It's going to be a huge storyline for us in a few weeks' time, so it's definitely one for the fans to watch out for." The storyline will reportedly air in November 2012 and is said to be one of the show's biggest moments of the year.

Lauren is later dumped by Joey after Derek blackmails him. Witts said that Joey will find life "really hard" after dumping Lauren. Derek suggests to Joey that if he tells the police that he was driving the car that drunken Lauren crashed, she can avoid a prison sentence. Joey agrees to the deception to help Lauren but is later horrified when Derek threatens to tell the police the truth unless he gets his own way. Speaking to Soaplife, Witts said "Joey must either move in with Derek and be a respectful and loving son, or dump Lauren. If Joey takes either of those options, Derek won't tell the police that Lauren was driving the car. Joey's love for Lauren is massive, but not quite as massive as his hatred for Derek. He decides to become the villain and lie that he never loved her. He'll take the flack because that will make it easier for her to move on without him." Witts also added that it will be "really hard" as he keeps making out to Lauren that he is not interested. Witts also said that Joey would be making a mistake if he told Lauren about Derek's blackmail. He commented "She's very headstrong and she'd say that she doesn't care about getting into trouble with the law. It would all end in tears. Everyone would find out as Lauren's the sort of person who'd blurt everything out, and it would cause even more of a mess. Joey very much thinks he's doing the right thing." Tony Discipline said that he does not mind watching Jossa's, his real-life girlfriend's scenes and that he supports the Joey and Lauren plot commenting "I don't find it strange to watch – it is part of the job. We always support each other and Jacqueline always asks me how it looks. But it is part of our job."

=== Breaks and departure ===
In August 2014, Jossa announced that she was expecting her first child. In December 2014, Jossa filmed her final scenes prior to taking maternity leave, which aired on 24 February 2015, following the show's 30th anniversary celebrations. She returned temporarily on 14 September 2015 for her father's murder trial before departing again on 2 October 2015. Lauren made a permanent return on 27 May 2016.

On 10 September 2017, it was announced that Jossa had been axed from the show by executive consultant John Yorke, along with Lorna Fitzgerald. An official spokesperson said: "We can confirm Jacqueline and Lorna will be leaving. They have been wonderful to work with and we wish them all the best for the future." Their exit story started airing during the Christmas period of 2017. Jossa's departure aired on 16 February 2018.

=== Reintroduction ===
In October 2022, Jossa was announced as one of several former cast members who would be returning to EastEnders for the funeral of Dot Cotton (June Brown), in a special tribute episode following Brown's death in April 2022. Speaking of her return, Jossa said: "Coming back to EastEnders for Dot's funeral was a no-brainer, and it was a real honour to be invited back. I had a lot of fun but, of course, it was bittersweet. It was amazing to be back, but hard to be filming this storyline. I can tell the viewers know that Dot gets the beautiful send-off that she deserves. June was the light and joy of EastEnders. I had so much fun working with her, the incredible stories and how infectious and witty she was. June is a legend and I miss her very much." Jossa made an unannounced return on 22 June 2023, to tie in with the return of Cindy Beale (Michelle Collins).

On 30 September 2023, it was confirmed that Jossa would be reprising the role. Speaking of her comeback, she said: "I'm really excited! It's such an amazing time to be back as there is so much buzz around EastEnders at the moment, and I've been watching and loving it like a fan. Walford holds such a special place in my heart, so it really does feel like coming home." Executive Producer Chris Clenshaw added that he was "delighted" and "thrilled" about Jossa's return.

== Storylines ==
=== 2006–2018 ===
The eldest child and daughter of Max (Jake Wood) and Tanya Branning (Jo Joyner), Lauren moves to Walford with her parents and younger sister, Abi (Lorna Fitzgerald), in July 2006. In 2007, Lauren discovers that her father is having an affair with her half-brother Bradley Branning's (Charlie Clements) fiancée, Stacey Slater (Lacey Turner), after accidentally filming them kissing on her video camera. Lauren burns the footage onto a DVD and it is played on Christmas Day, exposing Max and Stacey's affair and resulting in the breakdown of Max and Tanya's marriage. Romantically involved with Peter Beale (Thomas Law), Max disapproves of their relationship and demands Peter end the romance, but ends up throttling him when they meet secretly in the café. Shortly after, Max is left comatose, following a hit and run. It is revealed that Lauren is responsible but Tanya confesses to the crime and is imprisoned, pleading guilty to attempted murder. This distresses Lauren who confesses to the police and is found guilty of GBH with intent, and is sentenced to two years under supervision.

In 2008, paedophile Tony King (Chris Coghill), stepfather to Lauren's best friend, Whitney Dean (Shona McGarty), starts grooming her to replace Whitney. When Tony's paedophilia is revealed, Lauren is sickened to learn of his intentions. Unnerved, Lauren dumps Peter, who tells his friends that he and Lauren had a sexual experience in the allotments. However, the couple plan to reunite, and Lauren tells him she is ready to have sex, but Max bans them from seeing each other. Lauren leaves Walford when the extent of Max's debt is revealed by bailiffs who remove the family's possessions. She returns briefly at Christmas, and dumps Peter again before seeing him kiss Zsa Zsa Carter (Emer Kenny), causing a catfight between her, Zsa Zsa and Whitney. She attends Bradley's funeral after he falls from the roof of The Queen Victoria public house, while attempting to evade arrest by the police for the murder of Archie Mitchell (Larry Lamb) (see "Who Killed Archie?"). She celebrates her 16th birthday at a party in R&R nightclub, where her uncle Jack Branning (Scott Maslen) is shot by Kylie (Elarica Gallacher). After attending Abi's birthday dinner, Lauren informs Max that she is going to a summer camp in the United States.

Lauren (now played by Jacqueline Jossa) returns from America earlier than expected, after being expelled from school for smoking cannabis. She reveals that she has a new boyfriend, Edward Brooks (Luke Striffler), but they split up because of the distance. Lauren attends her cousin Billie Jackson's (Devon Anderson) birthday party, and gives him alcohol as a gift. Billie is found dead the next morning from alcohol poisoning. Billie's mother Carol (Lindsey Coulson) attacks Lauren, blaming her for encouraging Billie to drink. Lauren suspects that Max killed Archie after he tells her that Bradley was not the culprit, and she notes his violent tendencies when he confronts Jay Brown (Jamie Borthwick) for making crude sexual remarks after she rejects his attempt to proposition her. Lauren confronts Max and he tells her that he is not the killer but knows who is; after seeing Max and Stacey together, Lauren realises that Stacey killed Archie and tricks a confession out of her, which she records on her mobile phone. Lauren threatens to go the police, but agrees to keep quiet after discovering that Archie raped Stacey. However, on Christmas Day 2010, Lauren gives the recording to Janine Butcher (Charlie Brooks), and Stacey flees Walford after Janine exposes her. Lauren develops a crush on Whitney's half-brother, Ryan Malloy (Neil McDermott), and they begin an affair. The relationship is threatened when Tanya finds out, and their romance ends when Ryan flees after killing Rob Grayson (Jody Latham), who had been sexually exploiting Whitney for financial gain.

Lauren discovers that Max and Tanya are having an affair, despite Tanya now being married to Greg Jessop (Stefan Booth) and Max being engaged to Vanessa Gold (Zöe Lucker). Lauren threatens to kill Max unless the affair ends, but it secretly continues. The affair is exposed, and Max leaves Walford after Tanya rejects him. Lauren is angered by Tanya's actions, but is devastated to learn that Tanya has been diagnosed with cervical cancer. Lauren promises to support her, but struggles to cope with her mother's illness. She starts drinking excessively, and almost ends Darren Miller (Charlie G. Hawkins) and Jodie Gold's (Kylie Babbington) relationship by sleeping with Darren in the car lot hours before their wedding. She also casually dates Tyler Moon (Tony Discipline) until realising that Whitney is still in love with him. Max returns to Walford, and when Lauren learns that Tanya has stopped her cancer treatment, she begs him to stay and support Tanya.

Lauren's rebellion continues, and she reunites with her old friend Lucy Beale (Hetti Bywater) at Pat Evans' (Pam St Clement) funeral. After getting drunk at Pat's funeral, she is berated by her parents and given a private consultation with a GP. Lauren withdraws from school, and Max employs her at the car lot. She resumes drinking and tries to conceal this from her parents. Her drinking is exceedingly reckless, and on a night out with Lucy, she rejects Lucy's help to sober up. Lucy loses her, but later finds her passed out in the street. Lauren tells her parents that her drink was spiked before stating that she is mature enough to make decisions. She then decides to move out. On her 18th birthday, a drunken Lauren belatedly arrives at a family party, organised by Tanya. After being sick, Lauren admits to her parents that she is uncontrollable and promises to stop drinking. She moves back home after not being able to cope with the laziness of her housemates. Lauren and Lucy go out, where a drunken Lauren shares a kiss with a stranger, Dan, who drags her into his car. After Lucy manages to drag her out, they argue and Lauren storms off. Lucy finds her unconscious and takes her to hospital, but Lauren discharges herself. Lauren returns home to find Lucy has already told Max and Tanya everything. Angry, Lauren argues with her family and leaves, meeting Dan. After she rejects his advances, Lauren goes to Lucy's house, where Lucy tells her that she does not want anything more to do with her.

Lauren meets her cousin, Joey Branning (David Witts), and is instantly attracted to him. Her friendship with Lucy begins to improve after Lucy's father Ian Beale (Adam Woodyatt) disappears and Lauren helps find him. Joey and Lucy begin dating, but Lauren learns that Joey has cheated with Whitney, and urges her to tell Lucy. Lucy ends the relationship, and the girls take revenge by handcuffing him to playground equipment. Lauren decides to free him so he does not lose his job, but she slaps him when he insults her. Joey is working at R&R when he sees Lauren flirting with a group of men, so he throws them out and takes Lauren home. Lauren drunkenly kisses Joey, but he rejects her. Joey later explains that he rejected her because she was drunk and they kiss again. Lauren realises she cannot date with her cousin, so resists. Eventually, sexual tension mounts between them and they begin a secret relationship.

Joey's father Derek Branning (Jamie Foreman) discovers the relationship when he sees Joey and Lauren kissing in the car lot office. Derek threatens Lauren, so she and Joey plan to leave Walford. As they drive away in Derek's car, a drunken Lauren loses control of the car and crashes into a shop. Derek helps rescue them before the car explodes, and forces Joey take the blame for the crash. At the hospital, Lauren tells Tanya about her relationship with Joey, and Derek blackmails Joey to end it. Heartbroken and distraught, Lauren continues to drink and Tanya realises that Joey is still in love with Lauren. Lauren later drunkenly reveals her relationship with Joey to the rest of her family. Joey leaves Walford after Derek dies from a heart attack, but returns and reunites with Lauren, where Lucy witnesses them kissing. When trying to justify their relationship, Lauren is shocked when Lucy claims that she is undeserving of Joey's love. Lauren considers telling the police the truth about the car crash, but is convinced not to by Joey. Lauren and Joey's relationship is publicly revealed, though people start to accept it. Lauren discovers that Tanya has lied about missing a hospital appointment, and as Tanya refuses to talk, Lauren starts drinking heavily again. Lauren destroys her mother's wedding dress and cake before Tanya and Max can remarry. She later bonds with Max's secret wife, Kirsty Branning (Kierston Wareing), which upsets Tanya.

Lauren finds out that Kirsty is pregnant, unaware that she is lying. At a party, Lucy spikes Lauren's drink, so she drunkenly reveals that Kirsty is pregnant. Lauren falls out with Joey, who breaks up with her over her behaviour while drunk. She applies for a job as a waitress with Whitney at Ian's new restaurant, but Lucy convinces Joey to be Lauren's test customer to ensure that Lauren will fail. Whitney is offered the job, but purposely withdraws so that Lauren gets the job instead. She tries to make Joey jealous by kissing Tyler, who is engaged to Whitney, but this fails and Whitney ends their friendship, and Lucy offers the job to Whitney. Lauren's drinking intensifies, though she believes she is not an alcoholic and tricks her step-grandmother Dot Branning (June Brown) into giving her money to buy alcohol. Lauren then steals money from her maternal grandmother Cora Cross's (Ann Mitchell) purse and when Tanya discovers this, she compares her to her aunt, Rainie Cross (Tanya Franks), who is an alcoholic and drug addict. Disgusted, Lauren attempts to buy more alcohol but Kirsty refuses to serve her. Lauren confides in Joey, but Lucy sees this and goads Lauren into punching her and smashing the café window. Lauren is arrested, but Lucy decides not to press charges. Tanya and Max find alcohol bottles in Lauren's bedroom and decide to keep her locked in the house. Tanya believes Lauren is showing no signs of withdrawal, but Lauren reveals she has been drinking vodka from a water bottle. Tanya keeps Lauren locked in her bedroom, but her withdrawal leads her to climb out of the window and run away. Tanya kicks Lauren out after she destroys Abi's revision notes, and she stays with Max and Kirsty. Tanya asks Peter (now played by Ben Hardy) to spend time with Lauren, but their date is sabotaged by Lucy, so Lauren gets drunk again and leaves with a group of strangers. When she returns, her skin and eyes are yellow and she collapses in pain. She is taken to hospital and diagnosed with alcoholic hepatitis. She is warned that she could die if she does not stop drinking. Lauren returns home and confronts Lucy over her relationship with Joey. Tanya takes her home, where she admits that she cannot cope with her parents' arguing. Ultimately, Tanya blames herself and takes Lauren to a specialist clinic in Exeter.

Lauren, now a recovering alcoholic, returns to Walford and is upset to discover that Joey slept with Whitney while she was away. Lauren attends counselling and meets fellow recovering alcoholic Jake Stone (Jamie Lomas). She notices that he is married, but learns that is separated. Lauren falls in love with Jake, but discovers that he is still married to his wife Sadie Young (Kate Magowan). Lauren and Jake begin an affair. Max catches them and orders Lauren to end the affair. Joey asks Lauren to leave Walford with him, but she decides to stay and continues her affair with Jake. They are eventually caught by Jake's daughter, Bella Young (Isobelle Molloy). Understanding how Bella feels, Lauren ends the affair. When Sadie discovers the affair, Lauren attempts to apologise, but learns that Sadie and Bella have left Walford. She tries to persuade Jake not to start drinking, but he angrily throws a bottle of wine at Lauren, injuring her face; she forgives him before he leaves Walford. Lauren is shocked when she catches Stacey in The Queen Vic. She overhears Max and Stacey talking about a recent kiss they had and is agitated, asking her to stay away from Max. Lauren avoids Jake when he returns to Walford after he relapses.

Lucy asks Lauren to go into business with her. Although initially reluctant, Lauren agrees and they set up "LB Lettings". Lauren becomes suspicious that Lucy is dating Jake. Lucy reassures her, but Lauren is unaware that Lucy has begun a sexual affair with Max. Soon after, Lucy is found dead on Walford Common (see "Who Killed Lucy Beale?"). Determined to overcome her grief, Lauren restarts the business, but finds an email from someone wanting to meet on the night Lucy died. Believing Lucy went instead of her, Lauren tells the police but is not taken seriously, so she arranges to meet them herself. She is shocked when Jake arrives, and he chases her through Walford to stop her from going to the police. Jake is arrested, but Lauren doubts that he murdered Lucy. When Peter falls out with his girlfriend, Lola Pearce (Danielle Harold), Lauren comforts him and they kiss. Peter feels bad for cheating on Lola and leaves. Jake is released when evidence clears him of any involvement, makes peace with Lauren and leaves Walford. Lauren begins dating Dean Wicks (Matt Di Angelo), but is shocked when Peter breaks up with Lola and tells Lauren he loves her. When Peter is about to leave for New Zealand, Lauren ends her relationship with Dean and tells Peter she loves him. Lauren and Peter become paranoid that they are being followed. When they obtain a car registration, DS Emma Summerhayes (Anna Acton) discovers that it is a police car signed out to DS Cameron Bryant (Glen Wallace), but she informs people that the registration belongs to a reporter. On Halloween night, Lauren is stalked by someone wearing a Halloween mask. This is revealed to be Abi.

Peter asks Lauren to marry him. Lauren accepts, but after finding out that Peter was selling drugs to Lucy, she changes her mind. On New Year's Day 2015, Max's girlfriend Emma is killed in a car accident, shortly after meeting someone who she believed killed Lucy. Although Max destroys Emma's case notes, Lauren finds most of the pages and repairs them. Lauren asks Peter to marry her and he accepts. However, after finding a previously torn off piece of a page from Emma's case files and trying to use Emma's phone, Lauren starts to doubt if she should marry Peter and drinks most of a half-bottle of whisky in Max's office. When Lauren nearly faints, Stacey buys her a test and discovers that Lauren is pregnant. Stacey confronts her about it but Lauren reveals that she knows who killed Lucy, but refuses to divulge the identity to the police. When Stacey calls the police, she is upset at her inability to keep a secret but hands in most of Emma's case files, while keeping the torn-off piece. She writes a card addressed to Jane, saying that Lucy was killed at home, and abruptly leaves to book an abortion. However, during the consultation, Peter interrupts her and offers to support her through all her issues. Lauren says she is confused and that she knows what happened to Lucy, leading him to discover the truth about the murder at home. When Peter decides to emigrate to New Zealand, he asks Lauren to go with him. She initially refuses, planning to join Tanya in Devon but after he tells her that his brother Bobby Beale (Eliot Carrington) is Lucy's killer, she changes her mind and decides to go to New Zealand. They dispose of Emma's remaining evidence and SIM card, deciding not to tell the police about Bobby being Lucy's killer. She says goodbye to Max and Abi and leaves with Peter, taking an outfit for their unborn child with them.

A heavily pregnant Lauren returns for Max's murder trial, saying she knows who killed Lucy. As she threatens to tell everyone about Bobby, her waters break. She later gives birth to a baby boy who she names Louie, in honour of Peter's great-grandmother, Lou Beale (Anna Wing). Lauren convinces Abi to stop Max from going to prison and tells Jane Beale (Laurie Brett) that she is going to tell the truth but Max is found guilty, thanks to Phil Mitchell (Steve McFadden) bribing the jury foreman. Max is sentenced to 21 years imprisonment. Max discovers Lauren knew that he was innocent and disowns her. Lauren makes a statement to the Police claiming that Bobby killed Lucy but they do not believe her and she returns to New Zealand with Louie, vowing to come back and clear Max's name.

In May 2016, Bobby puts Jane in a coma and confesses to killing Lucy, so Ian's mother Kathy Sullivan (Gillian Taylforth) telephones Lauren and tells Ian that she and Peter are returning. However, when Lauren arrives with Louie, Ian is surprised to see his stepson Steven Beale (Aaron Sidwell) instead of Peter. Lauren tries to reconcile with an angry Abi, who is furious that Lauren did not tell her that Bobby killed Lucy. Lauren and Steven try to make Ian understand their relationship and why Peter has not returned. When Max is due to have a court hearing following Bobby's confession, Lauren and Abi write a letter saying they will wait for him in the pub, asking Stacey to deliver it. Stacey returns, saying she missed the hearing but passed the letter to his solicitor. Max is released but does not meet Lauren, so she goes home. The letter is returned and she runs outside to see Max leaving in a taxi. Lauren helps Abi get her job back in The Vic and decides to party with her friends. Lauren catches Abi and Lee and assumes that Abi is making a move on him, however Abi drunkenly reveals that she and Lee previously had sex. Lauren promises not to tell Whitney even though Steven tells her to. That same day, Lauren helps Whitney do a pregnancy test, which is positive. Lauren later warns Lee that she knows about his sex with Abi but says she will not say anything because it would mean ruining Whitney's happiness. When Whitney does eventually find out about Lee's unfaithfulness, Lauren supports her. She later starts a business as a web designer, with her first client being Belinda Peacock (Carli Norris). Steven is annoyed when Lauren buys a new laptop following a burglary at the Beales' restaurant. Steven tells Lauren he needed a way to pay debts and she promises not to tell Ian the truth about the burglary as long as they are honest with each other in future.

Lauren is excited when Louie says his first word: "mama". Steven gets him to say "dada" and records a video. Lauren sends it to Peter, which upsets Steven as he sees himself as Louie's father, but Lauren says Peter will always be Louie's father. When Jane discovers Steven has been stealing money from the restaurant, he explains he borrowed it to pay Peter's debts as he is drinking heavily and getting into fights, and Lauren does not know the whole truth. When Lauren learns this, she is angry that he was not honest and considers visiting Peter. Steven says he wanted to protect her and Louie, and going to New Zealand out of guilt or pity will be a mistake, so she decides not to go. Lauren starts to worry that her relationship with Steven has become stale but she does manage to seduce him until they are interrupted. While visiting Max at work, Lauren meets Josh Hemmings (Eddie Eyre) and they share an attraction. Lauren insists on meeting up with him to see what happens. Josh suggests that Lauren apply for a job at the company he works for, Weyland & Co, where Max also works. Lauren is shocked that Josh is one of the interviewers as she thought he worked on the photocopier, so she leaves but Josh follows; she slaps him for lying but they kiss. Meanwhile, Steven is eager for a baby with Lauren but she would rather concentrate on her career, so Steven starts piercing holes in his condoms. Lauren reaches the final two for the job and Max asks Josh not to employ Lauren, and he makes sure someone else gets the job, however, Josh visits Lauren at home and offers her a different job, and he meets Steven and realises Lauren is in a relationship and has a child. Thanks to Abi, Steven becomes paranoid about Lauren and Josh's relationship and starts tracking Lauren's whereabouts via a mobile app. Lauren finds out she is pregnant, and books an appointment to discuss an abortion, soon after revealing her intentions to Abi, as she is not ready to have a second child. Max tells a disbelieving Lauren that Josh is engaged, then Josh admits he is getting married in November. Lauren surprises and annoys Abi by arranging a secret Father's Day visit from Oscar for Max, neglecting to tell Abi about it. However, this drives Abi to reveal the abortion to Steven, though he decides not to confront Lauren. Lauren tells Josh that she loves Steven but admits that there are no "fireworks", and tells Josh that she will not cheat on him, unaware that Steven has been spying on her with a secret camera. Unaware that Abi and Steven have embarked on an affair, Lauren realises she does not love Steven and plans on returning to New Zealand to make amends with Peter. However, Steven learns about her plans and lies to her that he has an inoperable brain tumour. Lauren is wracked with guilt and decides to remain in Walford. In another desperate attempt to keep her, Steven spontaneously proposes to her in the Queen Vic, which she accepts. Lauren then resigns from Weyland & Co and starts planning her and Steven's wedding, however, after a fire which he started at Ian's restaurant, he dies. Lauren is devastated. Abi tries to tell her that she is pregnant with Steven's baby but Lauren misinterprets it as gloating about her own abortion, so Abi says that she wishes Lauren died instead and that she never deserved Steven's love, causing Lauren to start drinking again. On the day of Steven's funeral, Lauren finds out he lied about having a brain tumour and destroys his wreaths. When she finds out that Steven has been cremated, she refuses to scatter his ashes. Abi decides to leave Walford to visit Tanya and when Lauren learns of this, she asks if she and Louie can join her. Abi agrees and they leave Walford together; unbeknownst to Lauren, Abi is secretly taking Steven's ashes with her.

Lauren returns and moves back in with Ian and asks Josh for her job back. Josh accepts and flirts with Lauren but she rejects him again, but after numerous attempts, Lauren eventually gives into temptation and kisses Josh. When Josh's former fiancée, Imogen (Alexandra Sinclair) arrives unexpectedly at the office, she belittles Lauren and tells her that Josh dislikes children. To confirm this, Lauren asks Josh if he would like to spend time with her and Louie; he reluctantly accepts, but implies that they should go as a couple instead which displeases Lauren. Josh later tries to declare his love for her and asks why they cannot be together; she explains that they are different people and that she is a recovering alcoholic. Kathy advises Lauren to move on from Steven and pursue Josh, which she does and they start a relationship. Lauren discovers Weyland & Co's Project Dagmar, a plan to develop Albert Square into luxury apartments, and photographs a scale model. She threatens to publicise the project but her boss James Willmott-Brown (William Boyde), who is also Josh's father, convinces Lauren that the project has fallen through due to investors dropping out at the last minute and she deletes the photo. Josh confirms this, having only just heard about the project. However, it emerges that this was a lie and that Weyland & Co have bought several properties in Albert Square and are evicting business owners. Lauren refuses to give an eviction notice to Ian, so is fired. She discovers that Max is involved in the plan to con the residents. Willmott-Brown destroys Max's contract, revealing that he has also been manipulated, but Josh gives Lauren a copy as he is entitled to his share. Lauren asks Max for the truth or she will destroy the copy, but he destroys it himself, saying that he knew about Abi's affair with Steven and her pregnancy and that his plan was to exact revenge on those who abandoned him. Later, Josh tells Lauren that he can stop the development by revealing that Willmott-Brown bribes members of Walford Council. Josh asks Lauren to stall Willmott-Brown and Fi Browning (Lisa Faulkner) at a press launch so he can get evidence of the bribes, so she chains herself to their property, but is arrested for breach of the peace. Lauren is cautioned and released, and then kisses Josh when he says he has left Weyland, though his plan has failed. Josh is offered a new job in Glasgow and Lauren agrees to move there with him. Ian disapproves of her relationship with Josh when he catches them kissing which causes Lauren to slap Ian, but Kathy convinces him that Josh is not like his father. On Christmas Day, Max gives Lauren a thoughtful Christmas present and she tells him that he needs medical help. Tanya returns to take Lauren and Abi away from Walford, revealing that Max killed Steven and tried to kill Jane. Lauren and Abi reject Max. Max goes to the roof of The Vic where he plans to kill himself by jumping off, but Lauren and Abi climb on to the ledge to try and stop him. As Max agrees to come down, Lauren slips and she and Abi both fall off. They are taken to hospital, where Lauren has surgery on her pelvis, which is fractured, and Abi has a CT scan and is declared brainstem dead. When Lauren starts physiotherapy, she becomes frustrated with not being told the truth about Abi and breaks down when she sees her. Lauren slaps Max for lying to her about Abi's condition and is devastated by Abi's death. Lauren is distraught when Abi's life support is withdrawn.

Before Abi's funeral, Lauren lies to Max that it has already taken place because Tanya does not want him there, however, he realises it is a lie. On the day of the funeral, Lauren tells Whitney about her planned move to Scotland with Josh and Whitney asks her to be sure that she actually loves him or if she is only with him because he is good with Louie. After the service, she sees Max going into the chapel and tells him that she needs to leave, before hugging him and crying. Lauren then takes Louie from Josh and walks away without him. Cora later reveals that Lauren has moved to New Zealand, possibly reuniting with Peter.

Several months later, Ian agrees to babysit Louie while Lauren and Peter repair their relationship. Shortly afterwards, Kathy calls Ian to tell Lauren and Peter that Bobby is being released from prison. However, Ian tells her that Lauren is refusing to forgive Bobby for ruining her relationship with Max and causing Abi's death. In February 2020, Jack reveals to Max that Lauren and Peter have split up again, and he has been supporting Lauren financially. In November 2020, Lauren's house in New Zealand burns down and she asks Peter, who is now living in Walford, to send her money. Later, Max makes plans to visit Lauren with his lover Linda Carter (Kellie Bright), but eventually leaves for New Zealand alone when Linda rejects him.

=== 2022–present ===
Lauren briefly returns to Walford in December 2022 for Dot's funeral, where she comforts her uncle Jack and her cousin Sonia Fowler (Natalie Cassidy). She explains that Tanya has been aiding Cora who injured her hip, and they are both unable to attend. She also explains that she is not on speaking terms with Max after she caught him in bed with her best friend, and argues with Linda over her breaking Max's heart after their affair. Later, Lauren joins other Walford residents at Sonia's house to celebrate Dot's life.

In June 2023, Lauren visits Peter and Louie in France, where he is living with Ian. Unbeknownst to Lauren, Peter's mother Cindy Beale (Michelle Collins) is still alive and is also living with Peter and Ian. Peter confesses that he still loves Lauren. She reciprocates this at first, but when Ian has a heart attack, Peter, Lauren and Cindy all go to hospital. There, Lauren discovers that Cindy never died, and she confronts Peter. Lauren also berates Cindy for abandoning her family and not even coming back when Lucy was murdered. She later tells Peter that they will never get back together, as he and his family are still all liars. She then leaves for New Zealand, taking Louie with her.

In January 2024, it is revealed that Lauren is living with her cousin Penny (Kitty Castledine) in France. Peter contacts Lauren after missing her and Louie, and Lauren is encouraged by Penny to return to Walford so that Louie can reunite with Peter. However, Lauren is arrested for drug possession at the airport. Penny informs Jack and Peter of Lauren's arrest. Penny admits to planting drugs on Lauren, resulting in her release. Lauren is initially hostile towards Penny, but forgives her and they move in together. Lauren and Peter realise they still have feelings for each other. After being convinced by Cindy, Lauren rejects Peter's attempts to romance her.

Lauren is shocked when Whitney's fiancé Zack Hudson (James Farrar) attempts to kiss her while she is in Milton Keynes. She rebuffs his advances, and Zack convinces her not to tell a pregnant Whitney. Whitney returns from Milton Keynes and Lauren is stunned to discover that she is illegally fostering a girl named Britney Wainwright (Lola Campbell). Zack eventually finds out and confronts Whitney. Zack sleeps with Lauren after an argument with Whitney. Whitney's adoptive mother and Lauren's cousin, Bianca Jackson (Patsy Palmer), finds out slaps both Lauren and Zack for their betrayal. Whitney falls out with Bianca and asks Lauren to be her maid of honour at her wedding to Zack. During Whitney's hen party, Lauren and Whitney clash when Lauren berates Zack. Penny senses tension between Lauren and Whitney and locks them in Bianca's van together. While in the van, Whitney goes into labour and is taken to hospital, where she gives birth to a daughter named Dolly. At the hospital, Britney overhears a conversation between Lauren and Zack and realises that they slept together. Britney reveals the truth at Whitney and Zack's ill-fated wedding. Whitney attacks Lauren, and ends her relationship with Zack. Lauren and Whitney later meet in an attempt to repair their friendship, however this fails and Bianca throws a drink over Lauren. Whitney leaves Walford with Britney and Dolly after the betrayal. Lauren faces hostility from the residents in the wake of Whitney's departure, but is supported by Peter.

Lauren is badly injured during a crowd crush and stampede at Peggy's wine bar. She later discovers that she is pregnant while seeking medical advice for chronic pain. Lauren is concerned for the baby as she has been taking strong painkillers to deal with the pain; a midwife confirms that the baby is healthy. She then steals morphine from her cousin Amy Mitchell (Ellie Dadd) to cope with the pain. After taking the morphine, she comes across Kojo Asare (Dayo Koleosho) lying unconscious in the street, with Cindy standing over him. Unbeknownst to Lauren, Cindy is having an affair with Kojo's nephew Junior Knight (Micah Balfour), and was trying to manipulate Kojo into keeping their secret when he fell over a fire escape balcony. Lauren threatens to expose Cindy's role in Kojo's accident, but Cindy discovers the morphine and they blackmail each other. When Lauren threatens Cindy again, she purchases much stronger, illegal painkillers from drug dealer Ravi Gulati (Aaron Thiara), and begins supplying them to Lauren. After feeling the baby move, Lauren disposes of the pills, however she suffers from withdrawals and relapses. When Cindy discovers that Lauren is pregnant, she is furious and demands that Lauren reveals her painkiller addiction to Peter, but begrudgingly supplies Lauren with one last dosage. Lauren later attempts to manipulate Kojo into revealing what he knows about Cindy, but fails. That night, Lauren becomes high on morphine, and is unconscious when a fire starts in the flat. Peter and Ian then discover Lauren's addiction to painkillers. When Lauren reveals that Cindy had been supplying her with illegal pills, Cindy manipulates the situation and convinces Peter and Ian that Lauren is lying.

Unbeknownst to Lauren, Elaine Knight (Harriet Thorpe) discovers a recording which proves Cindy's affair with Junior, which Elaine uses to blackmail Cindy. Lauren discovers the recording and steals it on Christmas Eve 2024, tricking Cindy's ex-husband and Junior's father, George Knight (Colin Salmon), into playing it to the residents on Christmas Day. Cindy is subsequently disowned by her family, and Peter is angry with Lauren for destroying his family, so Lauren steals pills from Cindy's handbag and leaves the pub. When Cindy is attacked by an unknown assailant, Lauren becomes a suspect. Lauren is then worried and convinced that she was the one who attacked Cindy as she was addicted to painkillers during this time. When Peter proposes to Lauren, she turns him down for this reason. Peter's grandmother Kathy eventually confesses to Lauren that she is actually the one who attacked Cindy after she sees how the whole incident is affecting their relationship. Relieved, Lauren and Peter then get engaged after Lauren proposes to him. When Lauren goes into labour, Cindy helps her and they seem to reconcile. However, this is short-lived when the Beale family make clear that Cindy is not welcome and Lauren takes their side. Lauren gives birth to a boy and names him Jimmy, in honour of her late grandfather Jim Branning (John Bardon) In September 2026 Lauren starts a sexual affair with Peter's second cousin Mark Fowler Jnr (Stephen Aaron-Sipple) but tells him she's not leaving Peter and her sons.

== Lauren's Diaries ==
Following Jossa's first appearance, Lauren started appearing in her own internet spin-off series, Lauren's Diaries, and a second series started in 2011.

No.	Title	Duration	Original release date
Chapter 1
1	"I'm Back!"	1:52	8 October 2010
Lauren talks about taking drugs and being deported back to Walford from the United States.
2	"Eating My Weight in Ice Cream"	2:19	11 October 2010
Lauren video chats with her American friend Jessica, they talk about Lauren's holiday romance with Edward.
3	"It's My Cousin..."	2:10	29 October 2010
Lauren video chats with Jessica about Billie Jackson's (Devon Anderson) funeral and how it brought back memories of her half-brother Bradley Branning's (Charlie Clements) death.
4	"He Was Possessed"	2:43	9 November 2010
Lauren video chats with Jessica about her house being broken into.
5	"My Dad's a Lying Cheater!"	1:39	11 November 2010
Lauren talks about her uncle Jack Branning's (Scott Maslen) wedding to Ronnie Mitchell (Samantha Womack) and accuses her father Max Branning (Jake Wood) of murdering Archie Mitchell (Larry Lamb) (see Who Killed Archie?).
6	"Stacey Did It!"	1:06	12 November 2010
Lauren speaks about how Stacey Branning (Lacey Turner) murdered Archie and Max covered it up by blaming Bradley.
7	"I'm Gonna Make Her Pay"	0:52	15 November 2010
Lauren debates whether to hand over an audio recording of Stacey confessing to Archie's murder.
8	"If the World Burnt Down"	1:36	16 November 2010
Lauren talks about how Max will never change his ways.
9	"I Wanna Forgive"	1:19	30 November 2010
Lauren realises that she wants to live as a normal person like her siblings Bradley and Abi Branning (Lorna Fitzgerald).
Chapter 2
10	"... a big white dress"	2:35	12 April 2011
Lauren speaks about her being a bridesmaid at the wedding of her mother Tanya Branning (Jo Joyner) and Greg Jessop (Stefan Booth).
11	"Kate Middleton marries her prince"	2:45	29 April 2011
Lauren talks to Whitney Dean (Shona McGarty) about the royal wedding of Prince William and Kate Middleton. Fatboy (Ricky Norwood) also joins the video chat informing them that he has purposed to Mercy Olubunmi (Bunmi Mojekwu).
12	"Fatboy reveals feelings for Mercy"	2:54	16 May 2011
Lauren speaks about her cousin Tommy Moon's christening, and Fatboy calls round to talk to Lauren about his feelings for Mercy.
13	"I should be in my prime!"	1:42	26 May 2011
Lauren video chats with Whitney about Fatboy and Mercy getting married. Whitney's half-brother Ryan Malloy (Neil McDermott) makes a brief appearance mentioning that it is unbelievable that they are talking about clothes over a webcam, and he later invites Lauren to go for chicken with him and Whitney.
Chapter 3
14	"Why can't we just talk about things?"	3:55	19 October 2011
Lauren interviews her maternal grandmother Cora Cross (Ann Mitchell) about her relationship with her husband.
15	"You're so vain..."	1:34	1 November 2011
Lauren interviews Tyler Moon (Tony Discipline) about his relationship with his mother.
Chapter 4
16	"Happy 18th Lauren?"	4:14	23 March 2012
Lauren announces she is turning 18 years old on 30 March and that she would like to erase the last year of her life.

== Reception ==
Inside Soap commented on Lauren's recasting describing Lauren played by Duggan was "a pretty lass, but pretty unimpressive" and that played by Jossa she has acquired "an attitude as severe as her fringe". Jane Simon from the Daily Mirror said that Lauren played by Jossa "brings some badly needed oomph to the part". Jossa won Best Newcomer at the National Television Awards 2012. Executive Producer Bryan Kirkwood commented: "I'd like to say a huge congratulations to our girl, Jacqueline Jossa, for her amazing success. It's well-deserved recognition of Jacqueline's beautiful, truthful and moving portrayal of Lauren Branning." A writer for the Daily Mirror said that all of Lauren's problems are caused by her being a Branning. In August 2017, Jossa was longlisted for Sexiest Female at the Inside Soap Awards, while Steven's brain tumour lie to Lauren was longlisted for Best Shock Twist. Jossa's Sexiest Female nomination made the viewer-voted shortlist, but she lost out to Natalie J. Robb, who portrays Moira Dingle in Emmerdale. The scene in which Lauren and Abi fall from the roof of The Queen Vic was awarded "Scene of the Year" at the 2018 British Soap Awards, tying with Doctors who also won the same award for "The Bollywood Proposal".

In 2014, Matt Bramford from What to Watch put Lauren on his list of the 18 best recastings in British and Australian soap operas, commenting that Lauren went from a "moody, spoilt teenager" during Duggan's portrayal to a "moody, spoilt adult" in Jossa's 2010 portrayal. Laura-Jayne Tyler from Inside Soap chose Lauren as one of her four "Unsung Heroes" of British soap opera characters in 2025, calling Jossa the "powerhouse".

== See also ==
- "Who Killed Lucy Beale?"
