= Rainie Cross =

Fictional character from EastEnders

- EastEnders character
- Portrayed by: Tanya Franks
- Duration: 2007–2008, 2010–2011, 2014–2015, 2018–2022
- First appearance: Episode 3410; 2 August 2007
- Last appearance: Episode 6513; 25 August 2022
- Introduced by: Diederick Santer (2007); Bryan Kirkwood (2010); Dominic Treadwell-Collins (2014); John Yorke (2018); Chris Clenshaw (2022)
- Spin-off appearances: The Queen Vic Quiz Night (2020)
In-universe information
- Other names: Rainie Branning; Rainie Highway
- Occupation: Barmaid; Cleaner; Prostitute; Car salesperson; Undertaker
- Family: Branning
- Father: Bill Cross
- Mother: Cora Cross
- Sisters: Tanya Branning
- Half-sisters: Ava Hartman
- Husband: Max Branning (2018–2020); Stuart Highway (2020–present)
- Adoptive sons: Roland Highway
- Nephews: Oscar Branning; Dexter Hartman
- Nieces: Lauren Branning; Abi Branning
- Other relatives: Louie Beale; Jimmy Beale; Abi Branning Jnr

Rainie Cross (also Branning and Highway) is a fictional character from the BBC One soap opera EastEnders, played by Tanya Franks. Introduced as the drug-addicted sister of established character Tanya Branning (Jo Joyner), Franks has had three separate guest stints in 2007 (two episodes), 2008 (four episodes) and 2010 (seven episodes) and between 12 April and 8 December 2011. Rainie returned on 16 June 2014, when she was revealed as Ian Beale's (Adam Woodyatt) mystery phone contact, having been with Ian on Good Friday, the night of Lucy Beale's (Hetti Bywater) murder (see "Who Killed Lucy Beale?") but departed again not long after. In January 2015, it was confirmed that Rainie would return for the conclusion of the "Who Killed Lucy Beale?" storyline. Rainie made another guest appearance on 19 January 2018 and returned full-time to the show on 24 April 2018, now married to her former brother-in-law, Max Branning (Jake Wood). In June 2022, it was announced that Franks had left the show, with Rainie's final episode airing on 29 June 2022. She reappeared for a brief stint on 23 until 25 August 2022 to coincide with the departure of her husband Stuart Highway (Ricky Champ).

During her appearances Rainie has had sex with brothers Max, Jack (Scott Maslen) and Derek Branning (Jamie Foreman), joined Max in a custody battle with her mother Cora Cross (Ann Mitchell) over Max and Tanya's granddaughter Abi Branning Jnr, feuded with Ben Mitchell (Max Bowden) and kidnapped Abi. Rainie's other storylines have included a custody battle between Max and the Beale family over Abi, another drug relapse and addiction to painkillers, and her imprisonment for assaulting Kathy Beale (Gillian Taylforth), taking over the local funeral parlour alongside her husband Stuart, hiring Bernadette Taylor (Clair Norris) as a surrogate for her and Stuart leading to the birth of their son Roland, and supporting Stuart through his breast cancer diagnosis.

Described as "the slightly broken sister who's one step away from a vodka bottle", Rainie's storylines have often centred on her addictions to drugs and alcohol. During her seven-episode guest stint in 2010, Rainie was involved in a highly criticised crack cocaine storyline with Phil Mitchell (Steve McFadden). It was branded "inappropriate" and "horrid" by the Daily Record. EastEnders star Natalie Cassidy (who played Sonia Fowler) also criticised the storyline, saying she was "shocked", but Franks defended the storyline, though she herself was not surprised that viewers had complained.

== Development ==
=== Introduction and characterisation ===
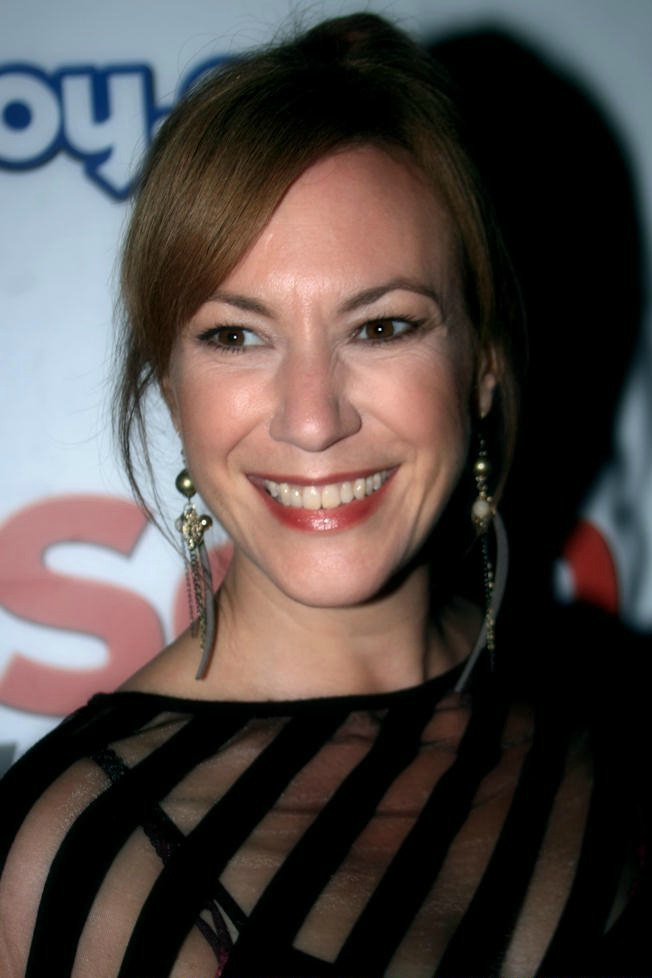
Tanya Franks plays Rainie

The character originally appeared for two episodes on 2 and 3 August 2007, and then returned for four episodes between 7 and 11 January 2008. Franks was asked to return again later in 2008 but could not make it, so Franks thought Rainie would not be seen again. She returned for the longer stint in 2010, starting on 3 August. Franks did not expect to be asked to return in 2010, and said the call came as a surprise. She said it was "ideal" because it fitted in with another acting job she was undertaking at the time. She commented that Rainie would be "unlikely to return without stirring up a bit of trouble". Rainie returned again on 12 April 2011 as a regular character, for Tanya's wedding to Greg Jessop, along with Tanya and Rainie's mother Cora, where Cora tries to build bridges between the sisters.

Rainie's been round the block and back again. Sly, manipulative and ruthless, Rainie struggled with everything – family, men and drug addiction. She was a thorn in her sister's side – she would beg, borrow and steal to fuel her heroin addiction. Selfish, and frequently self-pitying, Rainie was quick to point the finger of blame at Tanya and her mum Cora, rather than take responsibility for her actions.

— The BBC on Rainie (2011)

In April 2011, it was reported by The Sun that Rainie would have a one-night stand with Jack Branning on 6 May 2011 after he discovers his son is dead and she comforts him. In May 2011, it was announced that Cora would return to the series, and executive producer Bryan Kirkwood said he was "keen to establish the Cross women—Rainie completes the mix as the slightly broken sister who's one step away from a vodka bottle." Rainie has been described as "troublesome" and "troubled". On her official BBC character profile she is described as sly, manipulative and ruthless, and that she "spells trouble with a capital T!". It finishes by saying, "But behind the wild partying, Rainie is a lost soul with a soft, vulnerable side that yearns to get her life back on track and impress her older sister Tanya."

=== Notable relationships ===
==== Phil Mitchell ====
Rainie's relationship with Phil Mitchell (McFadden) was first explored during her stint in 2010. Rainie and Phil were to be involved in a storyline involving the taking of crack cocaine. Discussing her return in 2010, she said she was pleased to be working closely with McFadden as they had not worked together. Franks explained that after being thrown out of the house by Tanya's ex-husband Max, and moving in with Phil that, "it gets quite dark and dirty, really. Phil and Rainie are two people who meet at a point in their lives where they both see something equivalent in each other. He offers her something that she wants, and that is a place to be, while she has something that he wants, and that's drugs—so it's a match at that time." Franks was given advice from the charity DrugScope on how to act the part and also undertook some of her own research, and she said she believed the scenes to be very realistic. She wanted the drugs storyline to help people, saying, "If there are people who have a drugs problem, or an addiction problem of any kind really, they might watch something like this and it could trigger something in their mind that is relevant to them, or someone that they know. Hopefully it could make people think twice about carrying on with that, and perhaps look into getting some help. The organisation that we worked with, DrugScope, gives a lot of help and advice for people with drug addictions. I think it can be hugely helpful when a show as popular as EastEnders does something like this." She also stated that if EastEnders "has saved one life by putting this story out it's been worth it. The whole point of soaps is to reflect a certain amount of everyday life. Some of it is going to be light entertainment, some isn't."

"Rainie needs Tanya in her life ... They're almost acting like sisters now because Rainie's trying this time, and Tanya doesn't want to turn her back on her. Rainie's no angel by any stretch of the imagination, so we'll see if Tanya can find the strength to deal with her."

— Franks on Rainie and Tanya.

==== Tanya Branning ====
Rainie's relationship with Tanya has always been fractured, though Rainie tries to resolve the tension with Tanya during her return in 2011. When Rainie was first announced on 13 July 2007, it was said Rainie was said to "[drag] up a past which Tanya would rather forget". Rainie persuades Tanya to let her stay and forgive her and then going back on the promise, which leads Rainie to be kicked out. When Franks returned in 2010 she said "she was disappointed not to be working with Joyner this time." On her return to for Tanya's wedding, a spokesperson said, “Tanya soon softens towards Rainie and her mother but will the harmony last between all three women or will past problems cause the women to Cross swords once again?”. Franks has commented that she is excited about exploring the family dynamic between the Cross ladies in upcoming storylines and her future in EastEnders. Joyner said that Tanya would forgive Rainie for her past actions. In an interview with Digital Spy, Kirkwood said that he was 'delighted' at the expansion of Tanya's family and that "The new characters are excellent additions to a cast that's already very strong."

=== Reintroduction (2014) ===
Franks returned to the role of Rainie Cross for a stint on 16 June 2014. Her return was kept a secret by the cast and crew of EastEnders, and followed the surprise returns of Laurie Brett, Nicholas Bailey and Emma Barton as Jane Beale, Anthony Trueman and Honey Mitchell respectively. All of these returns were under new executive producer Dominic Treadwell-Collins.

Rainie was reintroduced as part of the "Who Killed Lucy Beale?' storyline, a story that began in April 2014 when Lucy Beale (Hetti Bywater) was murdered, and climaxed as part of the 30th anniversary celebrations of EastEnders in February 2015.

=== Reintroduction (2018) ===
On 18 January 2018, it was announced that Franks would reprise her role of Rainie. On her return, Franks stated: "It's like never having been away. I love working with everyone at EastEnders. With John Yorke at the helm at the moment, the show is in good hands and I'm excited to explore the next chapter in Rainie's journey." It was also revealed that Rainie would return for one episode later in January and would return for a full-time return later in the year. Rainie returned for one episode on 19 January 2018. Rainie returned in the episode broadcast on 24 April 2018.

== Storylines ==
=== 2007–2008 ===
Rainie first appears at her sister, Tanya Branning's (Jo Joyner) house claiming that she is no longer using drugs but Tanya catches her attempting to inject heroin and gives her a choice to take £500 and never see Tanya or her children again, or stay the night and get help with her problems. Rainie leaves with the money without Tanya's knowledge. Ignoring Tanya's ultimatum, Rainie returns to Walford in January 2008. Tanya is in an emotional state, having recently split from her husband, Max Branning (Jake Wood), following his affair with his daughter-in-law, Stacey Branning (Lacey Turner). Repentant, Rainie tells Tanya that she has stopped using drugs and has kicked her habit; she pledges to stay in Walford to support her sister through her break-up, proving that she has changed. She gives Tanya back the £500 that she stole from her and tries to build her relationship with Tanya. Tanya temporarily lets Rainie stay, but she tests positive for Marijuana. After an argument, Rainie leaves Walford. It is later revealed by Max to Tanya in October 2008 that Rainie is living and working as a barmaid in Nottingham.

=== 2010–2011 ===
Rainie returns to Walford in 2010 and tells Max she is clean and sober, and asks Max for Tanya's phone number. Tanya's daughter, Abi Branning (Lorna Fitzgerald), wants Rainie to stay and Max agrees. She steals money out of Max's sister Carol Jackson's (Lindsey Coulson) purse, which she uses to buy crack cocaine. Max catches her with the drugs and throws her out. She starts looking for her drugs when a drunken Phil Mitchell (Steve McFadden) approaches, finds Rainie's crack cocaine and is tempted to try some after she says it helps her block out her memories. Phil and Rainie get high at Phil's home. Rainie goes to get more drugs when Phil steals money from The Queen Victoria pub, but is mugged by a drug dealer. Phil's girlfriend Shirley Carter (Linda Henry) offers to help him get clean but throws Rainie out of the house, calling her pathetic.

In 2011, Rainie returns to Tanya's house as their mother, Cora Cross (Ann Mitchell), is visiting. Rainie says she is now completely clean and is staying with Cora because her counsellor wants her to reconnect with her family. When Tanya and Greg Jessop (Stefan Booth) go on their honeymoon, Rainie looks after their house and meets Phil at R&R. They talk about their past but he tells her that he does not want to associate with her and leaves. She and Jack Branning (Scott Maslen) then get drunk together, go to his flat and have sex. Jack rejects Rainie the following morning. Tanya and Greg return and see how much trouble Rainie has caused. She also causes trouble with Shirley so Tanya asks her to leave but Rainie persuades Tanya to let her stay, much to Greg's disappointment. Rainie visits Jack's wife Ronnie Branning (Samantha Womack) to find the knickers she supposedly left behind and taunts Ronnie, asking her to tell Jack to phone her, leading to her being kicked out again. She joins a support group to help her stay off drugs and alcohol which Phil also attends. Rainie struggles and calls her drug dealer but Phil catches Rainie with drugs and takes them from her, destroying them. She gets drunk and goes to Tanya's salon, where Tanya takes her home. Greg throws her out after Tanya lies that Rainie tried to stab her. A few days later, Phil finds Rainie in the pub and Shirley catches them talking and wrongly assumes they are romantically involved but finds out that Phil has been sponsoring Rainie. Shirley almost gives Rainie a job in the café but changes her mind.

Rainie leaves Walford again but insists on her return that she is still not taking drugs. However, she faces several temptations by people offering her drugs, eventually buying some from Ryan Malloy (Neil McDermott). When Phil finds out, he asks Ryan to not sell to Rainie again. Dot Branning (June Brown) takes pity on Rainie and helps her to clean herself up, telling her about drug addict Donna Ludlow (Matilda Ziegler) and giving her a Bible, which makes Rainie decide to change as she finds religion. Rainie apologises to Tanya for being rude to her earlier in the week, and Tanya agrees to let her stay with her and Greg. Rainie and Cora confide in one another when Rainie says Tanya treats her like a child. When it is revealed that Tanya had an affair with Max, Rainie nearly turns to drink, but stops herself. She gets a job at the R&R club, unaware that she only got it because her boss, Janine Butcher (Charlie Brooks) wanted to irritate Phil. The next week, Phil demands Janine sack Rainie and she agrees but Rainie later applies for a job as an office worker with Janine's new property management business but Janine makes her a cleaner. When Phil is sent photos relating to an incident from his past, Rainie stops him turning to drink. Phil tells her about the incident and they start to kiss, but are interrupted by Pat Evans (Pam St Clement). Rainie mentions the photos to Shirley, making Shirley think Rainie is sending them so she threatens Rainie, telling her to stop.

Rainie later discovers that Tanya has cervical cancer. Max returns with his older brother, Derek Branning (Jamie Foreman), and Derek recognises Rainie from Max and Tanya's wedding and is attracted to her, later mentioning that they had sex. Rainie demands to know why Tanya stopped her treatment and she explains that it did not work for their father and admits she helped him die, shattering Rainie and Cora. Though Tanya and Cora reconcile, Rainie is still angry, telling Tanya she hopes the cancer kills her. She sleeps rough, but then meets Derek and starts a sexual relationship with him. Rainie asks Tanya to apologise over their father's death but she refuses, as she does not regret her actions. Cora backs Tanya up and tells Rainie she is ashamed to be her mother so Rainie decides to leave for Tanya's sake, though she apologises for her comments. She breaks up with Derek and leaves.

In October 2012, Tanya and Max decide to remarry. Tanya wants Rainie to attend the wedding but doesn't know where she is and asks Cora to track her down. With help from Jack, Cora manages to get in touch with Rainie and arranges to meet her at a pub, but upon arriving, Rainie has sent her sponsor Olivia (Samantha Best), to the pub with a letter. Olivia explains that Rainie has been sober for 41 days and has a boyfriend. Rainie is pleased to have been invited to the wedding but declines to attend, stating that Cora is the reason for her alcohol and drug addictions, requesting that she will leave her alone from now on.

=== 2014–2015 ===
For several weeks following the death of his daughter Lucy Beale (Hetti Bywater) (see "Who Killed Lucy Beale?"), Ian Beale (Adam Woodyatt) receives texts and calls from "R", all of which he ignores. After texting her to leave him alone, "R" comes to Walford and is revealed to be Rainie. She blackmails Ian, threatening to tell his fiancée Denise Fox (Diane Parish) and son Peter Beale (Ben Hardy) that he was seeing her as a prostitute on Good Friday, the night of Lucy's death. When Patrick Trueman (Rudolph Walker) sees Rainie, she reveals what Ian has done, but he is unable to tell Denise when he suffers a major stroke. Ian meets Rainie to tell her that he will not pay her anymore, but Mick Carter (Danny Dyer) catches Ian and pulls up behind him. Ian drives away so Rainie approaches Mick, thinking he is a customer. He rejects her but the police arrest him for soliciting a prostitute. To protect Ian, Mick pleads guilty. Rainie and Cora meet at the court, as Cora has come to support Linda Carter (Kellie Bright). Cora confronts Rainie, and realises that she is the prostitute involved, and sees how low she has fallen and gives her money to fund her addiction so she can stop her prostitution. Ian tells Phil what has happened, so Phil pays Rainie, telling her to stop blackmailing Ian. Phil finds a flat for Rainie in Walford but she is thrown out by her landlord because of her prostitution. Phil takes Rainie to Cora to deal with her, so Cora lets Rainie live with her. Rainie tries to blackmail Mick into giving her more money but he insults and humiliates her. She then tells Denise about her night with Ian. Cora promises to help her get clean, but when she goes out, she returns to find Rainie gone and that she has stolen all her money. A flashback later reveals what happened between Rainie and Ian on the day Lucy died.

=== 2018–2022 ===
Rainie returns to Walford in January 2018, visiting her niece Abi, whose life support is to be turned off. Rainie brings a diamond healer as a gift to Abi. The family are devastated when Abi's life support is switched off and she dies. When Max returns to Walford following a break away after Abi's funeral, he marries Rainie and later introduces her as his wife to the residents. Rainie, who claims to now believe in God, stays with Max in his newly acquired car lot and he promises to get them a home and when they visit Abi's daughter, Abi Branning, Max vows that they will get custody of her. Rainie and Max meet with Abi's social worker and use Jack's house to convince him they are suitable to raise Abi and after the meeting, Rainie and Max row about Rainie potentially ruining Max's plan to raise Abi. When Cora offers Rainie the chance to leave Max, relocate to Exeter, run a tearoom and be part of Abi's upbringing with her and Tanya, Rainie takes a cheque from Cora for £50,000, but contacts social worker Calvin and Jamahl visits in Calvin's place. He is not expecting Cora to be there and Cora says Rainie is leaving Max to help her raise Abi, to which Jamahl says the courts still have to decide, however, Rainie says she will not leave Max and they reveal Cora's bribe. Despite initially only having married Max as a business arrangement, Rainie begins to develop genuine feelings for him and is devastated when he nonchalantly reveals he believes Rainie will find somewhere else to live after the custody case. She is also upset when Max signs up for a dating service for one-night stands. Rainie suggests that they have one night of casual sex together, claiming that they are professionals and only need to do it once. Max is almost convinced but Rainie is thrown off course when a woman using the dating service texts Max. Rainie continues to fight her feelings for Max and becomes furious when Max does not show it back. She attempts to leave but Max stops her and begs her to stay. After an emotional talk with Jack, they sleep together again. They agree that it is nothing more than a one-off, but Rainie feels guilty and decides to leave Walford. Max manages to catch her at the station and persuades her to stay. Unknown to Rainie and Jack, his daughter Amy Mitchell (Abbie Knowles) has videoed them kissing.

In 2019, Rainie enters into a relationship with local resident Stuart Highway (Ricky Champ) and they enjoy a stable relationship, working at the local funeral parlour together under Jay Brown's (Jamie Borthwick) management. They marry the following year after Rainie asks Max for a divorce. The two try for a baby together after Rainie reveals that drugs have made her infertile and they look for alternative options. When Max leaves Walford, he leaves Abi in Rainie’s care but Rainie is distraught when Max snatches her back after Jack takes Abi to France to spend time with Max. They initially ask their colleague Tiffany Butcher-Baker (Maisie Smith) to be a surrogate but she later backs out of the deal, to Rainie and Stuart’s disappointment. However, Bernadette Taylor (Clair Norris) agrees to do it instead. Although there are concerns due to Bernadette’s weight and previous miscarriage, she falls pregnant. In this time, Rainie stops smoking and moves to vaping instead. Stuart becomes distant from Rainie when he learns he has male breast cancer and the rift between them grows further when their son, Roland Highway is born and Stuart suffers from post-natal depression. Rainie leaves Walford in June 2022 when she believes her marriage is not salvageable but returns a few months later to support Stuart when he holds a group of people hostage at the doctor’s surgery. Rainie and Stuart have a heart to heart and decide to move away from Walford to the flat Rainie has been living in London with Roland, stealing one of Jay’s hearses in the process.

== Reception ==
Franks said that after her stint in 2008, many people recognised her in the street and asked if she would return. Scenes showing Phil and Rainie taking the drug crack cocaine in 2010 prompted over 200 complaints from viewers who felt the scenes were inappropriate. The BBC responded by saying "EastEnders in no way—and at no point—glamorises or condones the use of drugs, and furthermore we took great care to avoid any demonstration on how to prepare or take drugs. [...] We took care to signal the nature of the episode's content to viewers in advance through programme publicity and billings, and the BBC Action Line was trailed following the episode for anyone affected by the issue. In addition to this, our website includes links to organisations who can offer help and advice on this issue. [...] We worked closely with drug and alcohol charities, including Addaction and DrugScope, throughout the editorial process to ensure that we handled the storyline accurately and sensitively." Other viewers said, "They look like they're having a good time. They're in danger of making it look appealing." Finally, "It was a bit much. I've found EastEnders distressing over the last month." The Daily Record described the scenes as 'disturbing'.

In April 2018, following the revelation that Rainie had married Max, the Belfast Telegraph reported how fans were "stunned" and "horrified" by the reveal, with fans expressing their opinions on Twitter. Following Rainie's June 2022 departure, Laura-Jayne Tyler from Inside Soap wrote, "We refuse to believe this is the end for Rainie. She's far too good for EastEnders to let go!"

== See also ==
- List of soap opera villains
