= Everyone's Going to Die =

- Theatrical Release Poster
- Directed by: Jones
- Written by: Jones
- Produced by: Kelly Broad; Jones
- Starring: Nora Tschirner; Rob Knighton
- Cinematography: Dan Stafford-Clark
- Edited by: Jones
- Music by: Charlie Simpson
- Release date: 10 March 2013 (SXSW)
- Country: United Kingdom
- Language: English
- Budget: £65,000

Everyone's Going to Die is a 2013 British film written and directed by directing collective Jones. The film had its World Premiere at South By Southwest in 2013, followed by its UK Premiere at the Edinburgh International Film Festival.

The film centres around Melanie (Nora Tschirner), whose life is going nowhere. When a mysterious man, Ray (Rob Knighton), comes into town, she sees an opportunity to save herself. Attempting to leave their pasts behind and move on, the pair endeavours to change their lives for the better.

== Plot ==
We first see Melanie (Nora Tschirner), a young German woman who's moved to an English seaside town to be with her fiancé, dressed as Charlie Chaplin, the morning after a party. Her fiancé has left her there, which is where she meets Ali (Kellie Shirley) who offers to find her a job waitressing. She seems to be drifting, with no job, money or friends - her aimless existence broken up by supervising her fiancé's niece – a task that she doesn't appear to relish.

She meets 50-something Ray (Rob Knighton), when he offers to pay for the coffee that she can't afford. Ray looks and sounds like a clichéd East End hitman, and we soon learn that it's not far from the truth... but it's not the whole truth. Ray has returned to the town he grew up in to pay his respects to his recently deceased brother's family.

Their relationship grows slowly, as they reveal confidences, share awkward, darkly funny situations (meeting Ray's eccentric relatives) and enjoy being together.

When Ray & Melanie meet Ray's niece Laura (Madeline Duggan) it sparks a new effort in Ray to deal with his family past. For Laura, it’s her chance to find a confidant in her uncle. After a long day together, where they are closer than ever, Melanie gets a call from Ali saying there is a job going at the restaurant she works at, Beavers. Reluctantly, Melanie says yes and leaves Ray to start work as a roller skating waitress. It’s rock bottom for her, and later that night she leaves and wanders to ‘their spot’, on the harbour. Only to find Ray there, in a similar state of mind. This is the turning point for both of them. Melanie jumps into the harbour to challenge Ray’s fear of water. He jumps in after her and together they agree now is the time to stop looking back and start looking forward. Melanie goes home and packs her things – not a lot admittedly – while Ray attends to his own unfinished business. As Melanie takes the train out of town she looks out at the landscape speeding past, whilst a familiar figure walks through the carriage.

== Cast ==
- Nora Tschirner as Melanie
- Rob Knighton as Ray
- Kellie Shirley as Ali
- Madeline Duggan as Laura
- Stirling Gallacher as Jackie

== Production ==
The film was made for just £65,000. It was filmed over the course of 20 days on location in Folkestone, Kent including The Quarterhouse, The Leas, Folkestone Harbour, Dymchurch Amusements, The Grand and The Warren Country Park. The film's music was scored by Charlie Simpson.

== Release ==
Everyone's Going To Die had its world premiere at South By Southwest on 10 March 2013. It was first released theatrically in France in July 2014, and then in Latin America soon after. The film was released in the UK in June 2015. A release in USA and Germany is planned for winter 2015.

== Reception ==
The film received positive reviews from critics. Rotten Tomatoes, a review aggregator, reports that 71% of the surveyed critics gave the film a positive review. Garry McConnachie of the Daily Record (Scotland) called it "An utter gem. The reason why UK independent cinema can, at times, excite." The film was chosen by Little White Lies (magazine) as one of their "Five Best" from the Edinburgh Film Festival.

Critics were particularly complimentary of the film's direction, especially given the film's low budget. Den of Geek described it as being like "Before Sunrise with harsher edges...Jones are a talent worth watching" while Seensome.com called it "a triumph in independent filmmaking that instantly makes Jones, Tschirner and Knighton ones to watch."

The film was nominated at the British Independent Film Awards 2013 in the Raindance Award category.
