= Greg Jessop =

Fictional character from EastEnders

- EastEnders character
- Portrayed by: Stefan Booth
- Duration: 2010–2011
- First appearance: Episode 4080; 1 October 2010
- Last appearance: Episode 4304; 21 October 2011
- Introduced by: Bryan Kirkwood
In-universe information
- Occupation: Construction worker
- Mother: Moira Jessop
- Wife: Tanya Branning (2011–2012)
- Stepsons: Oscar Branning
- Stepdaughters: Lauren Branning; Abi Branning

Greg Jessop is a fictional character from the BBC soap opera EastEnders, played by Stefan Booth. He was introduced as the fiancé of Tanya Branning (Jo Joyner), and first appeared on screen on 1 October 2010 to work on the reconstruction of The Queen Victoria public house. In February 2011 it was announced that filming had commenced for Greg and Tanya's upcoming wedding in April 2011. However, it was unconfirmed if they would actually marry, meaning that the couple's future would hang in the balance until the time of broadcast. Greg and Tanya's wedding was branded the "swankiest wedding the show's seen". On 15 April 2011, Greg and Tanya wed, just before hearing that Tanya's ex-husband Max Branning (Jake Wood) and their daughter Abi Branning (Lorna Fitzgerald) had been involved in a car accident. Joyner has warned that Tanya could break Greg's heart. Greg has been described as "gorgeous", "loyal" and a "himbo with a good heart".

Joyner opined that Greg was right for Tanya, saying, "She'll be safe with Greg. He's the right man for Tanya at the moment". Booth said that he was "pleased" that his character was involved in some of the soap's biggest dramas. Digital Spy held a poll asking people who they thought Tanya should be with. Greg came second, with 35.2% of the vote. Booth told Digital Spy that Greg would fight for Tanya with the possibility of a punch up between Greg and love rival Max. In June 2011, it was announced that Greg would leave EastEnders at the end of his storyline. Greg departed on 12 August 2011. After his departure, Booth confirmed that Greg would return. He returned for a single episode on 21 October 2011. Booth admitted he was "disappointed" after EastEnders bosses decided to axe his character. The door was left open for a possible return.

== Character creation ==
=== Casting ===
Greg is introduced as Tanya's fiancé and a rival of Tanya's ex-husband Max, and a spokesperson for the programme commented, "Max has his fair share of women but he still has a soft spot for Tanya despite all they have been through. Don't be too surprised if he makes mincemeat out of Greg." Booth, who was initially on a short-term contract to appear in the show, said, "I'm absolutely delighted to be coming into Albert Square. Even as a kid, [...] we'd all sit in front of the telly watching EastEnders. Jo Joyner is a splendid actress to work with and I can't wait to get my teeth into the exciting storylines ahead." Booth revealed in a Digital Spy interview that his contract had been extended and he had filmed scenes for January 2011. Booth commented that it was "refreshing" to play Greg, who is a nice character. He commented: "Greg is probably one of the few happy characters in the Square and [Tanya] is his whole world. I think that's nice to see in the soap. I love playing bad boys but this has been a refreshing change." Booth used to play villain Jamie Nash in the Channel 4 soap opera Hollyoaks. Booth made his first appearance as Greg on 1 October 2010.

=== Personality ===
The character's profile on the official EastEnders website describes him as gorgeous and loyal with a feminine side, and he cares about his looks, having regular work outs, manicures and exfoliation treatments. He is not a womaniser as his mother, Moira, showed him how to treat women properly. He is good with Tanya's children Abi, Lauren and Oscar (Charlee and Neo Hall).

Move over Ryan Malloy, there's a new piece of eye candy in town! Tanya Branning's husband, Greg is a Walford hottie and is turning heads like Bianca Jackson's fashion sense. He's gorgeous, loyal and a got a buff body to boot - he's a sure step up from Max!

— The BBC's description of Greg 2010)

Soaplife called him "a genuinely nice guy with no skeletons in his closet". Booth told the magazine that Greg likes being a father to Tanya's children and that Tanya "completes him." He told Digital Spy that Greg adores Tanya and she has probably not had the kind of affection from Max that she gets from Greg. When Greg and Tanya move to Albert Square, Booth told Soaplife that Greg sees no reason why he and Max cannot live in peace as neighbours. Joyner opined that Greg was right for Tanya, saying, "She'll be safe with Greg. He's the right man for Tanya at the moment. Women like Tanya can't help but love a wrong 'un though, so I do worry that Greg might turn out to be too nice. Poor Greg! But at the moment she's happy."

=== Departure ===
Greg left the soap on 12 August 2011. Booth said that Greg would return to the soap after his departure. Greg returned for one episode on 21 October to conclude his storyline. Upon his one episode return, Joyner said she was "surprised" when she found out Greg would turn his back on her. Joyner told Inside Soap: "Tanya gets carried away as she talks to him. Tanya wants some support, but Greg won't give it to her. He says, 'I've got to go, the car's on the meter'. I mean, come on! Who ever had a car on a meter in Albert Square? I think that says it all, really. He's a bit rubbish. It's a surprise, because I thought Greg would be the one who'd stick around and help out. But you know what? He actually doesn't owe Tanya a thing, does he? Maybe he's grown some balls. He'd be a complete mug to come back and nurse her through this."

== Development ==
In February 2011 it was announced that filming had started on location for Greg and Tanya's upcoming wedding in April 2011, with a spokesperson saying, "It's probably the swankiest wedding the show's seen." However, it was unconfirmed if they will actually marry, meaning that the couple's future will hang in the balance until the time of broadcast. Joyner expected the wedding to go bad saying, "People stop me to ask if I think the marriage will be a disaster and I tell them, 'Greg sees her in her dress before the ceremony, she's late to the church, it rains and they live in Walford'. It's not looking good".

Booth told Digital Spy that Greg would fight for Tanya with the possibility of a punch up between Greg and love rival Max. Discussing who would win in a fight between Greg and Max, Booth told Inside Soap that Greg "would do his best to avoid fisticuffs" in most areas of his life. However, he added: "If he had to fight over anything, it would definitely be to defend Tanya or their love together. That's the one thing he'd step up for." Meanwhile, asked whether he would like Greg to show a darker side, Booth replied: "Greg's tough but gentle. He's fundamentally a nice guy and it's rare to get that in a soap. He seems very straightforward, so it's refreshing for Tanya to have that influence in her life."

Greg Jessop dreams of starting a family with wife Tanya. Tanya already has three children from her relationship with ex-husband Max. Jo Joyner, who plays the character, recently suggested that she should not have a fourth. However, speaking to PA, Booth commented: "I'm sure kids would definitely be on the list of wants for Greg - everything that's secure and 2.4 and blissfully normal - but it's EastEnders, isn't it? "You're in EastEnders, the sky could fall on your head next with no prior warning. Everything changes on a dime, so watch this space."

Booth said that he is "pleased" that his character is involved in some of the soap's biggest dramas. He said to PA: "It's a drama! And from an acting perspective it's really good because we get some really gritty storylines, so from a personal point of view I really enjoy what they throw at us." Speaking of the upcoming British Soap Awards, he added: "It's how the votes go. We just do the best we can and if people are going to vote for the storylines and for the people, great. All that we can concentrate on is just doing a good job."

== Storylines ==
Greg is first mentioned in March 2010 at the funeral of Tanya's former stepson Bradley Branning (Charlie Clements) by Tanya's daughters, Abi (Lorna Fitzgerald) and Lauren (Madeline Duggan, later Jacqueline Jossa), who tell their father that Tanya is waiting for them outside with her new boyfriend. In June 2010, when Max visits, Tanya reveals that she and Greg are engaged. Greg comes to Albert Square with Tanya, who is visiting Lauren and Greg meets Alfie Moon (Shane Richie) who invites him to his illegal drinking den in the basement of The Queen Victoria. Alfie and Max, who is also there, suspect Greg is gay and Alfie jokes to Greg that Max has a crush on him. This causes animosity between them when they are locked in alone. Later, Max returns home and Tanya brings Greg to meet him, not realising they have already met. Greg then reveals Alfie has given him the contract to refurbish the pub. After a few days, Greg realises Jay Brown (Jamie Borthwick) has stolen some of his power drills. Tanya comes to Walford and introduces Greg to Jane Beale (Laurie Brett) and her husband, Ian Beale (Adam Woodyatt), whom he quickly makes friends with. On the day of the pub's opening night, Greg reports that the electrics have failed and that his workers are unable to have the pub ready in time, much to the anger of Kat Moon (Jessie Wallace) who accuses Greg of not trying hard enough. Greg and Tanya visit Walford after the pub is finished and become friends with Max and Vanessa Gold (Zöe Lucker), and are invited to the Brannings' for Christmas dinner.

Tanya and Greg set a date for their wedding and Greg works for Zainab Masood (Nina Wadia) fixing the roof of her new restaurant the Argee Bhajee. Tanya and Greg then move to Roxy Mitchell's (Rita Simons) house in Albert Square to be closer to Lauren and Abi. Tanya opens the salon in their living room alongside Syed Masood (Marc Elliott), which annoys Greg. He agrees to buy Roxy's salon for Tanya as a wedding present. Greg invites Tanya's estranged mother, Cora Cross (Ann Mitchell) to the wedding and Tanya is annoyed but forgives him. At his stag party, he hears Max say that Tanya does not deserve Greg so Greg confronts him and later rips up his and Vanessa's invites. He takes Ian home and bumps into Jane who has just had a row with Tanya and is very drunk. Jane kisses Greg but he pushes her away and tells her to forget that it ever happened. Greg and Tanya marry and go on their honeymoon. After they return, Tanya begins an affair with Max. When she thinks she might be pregnant, she tells both Max and Greg, but a test shows she is not. Greg then hopes to have a child with Tanya, but discovers contraceptive pills. Lauren covers for Tanya by telling Greg they are hers. Greg is annoyed when Cora and Rainie come to stay. Tanya gets angry when Greg buys a rocking horse for a future child, and she later confesses to Greg that she does not want more children. Greg describes how he wants to hold his own newborn child in his arms and have someone to call him 'dad'. Tanya says that that is not what being a father is about, and says he is already being a father to her children. Greg reluctantly agrees. However, he discovers that Tanya is having an affair with Max and in disgust he leaves her and goes on holiday without her. While away, Greg sells the house to Janine Malloy (Charlie Brooks), forcing Tanya and her family to move out.

Greg returns to Walford months later, having been called by Lauren when Tanya begins to unravel. Tanya reveals her diagnosis of cervical cancer to Greg but he is unable to handle it, so makes an excuse and leaves, leaving a hysterical Lauren behind.

== Reception ==
An EastEnders insider said that Greg and Tanya's wedding is the "swankiest wedding the show's seen." Digital Spy held a poll asking people who they thought Tanya should be with. Greg came second, with 35.2% of the vote, whereas Max came first with 49.7% of the vote. 15.1% of viewers said they didn't want Tanya to be with either of the two.
