= Madeline Duggan =

British actress (born 1994)

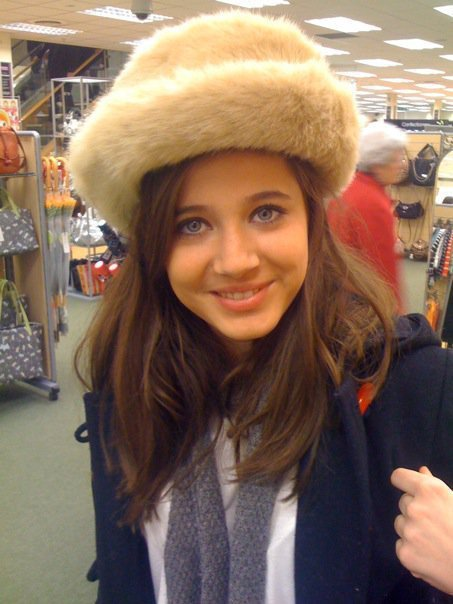
- Duggan in 2012
- Born: 28 June 1994 (age 31); Bermondsey, England
- Occupation: Actress
- Years active: 2003–present

Madeline Duggan (born 28 June 1994) is an English actress, known for her portrayal of Lauren Branning in the BBC soap opera EastEnders from 2006 to 2010.

== Career ==
In 2003, Duggan portrayed the role of Little Cosette in a production of Les Misérables at the Palace Theatre, London. She then played the lead role in two short films; Amanda in Between Us (2004), and Ellie in Spoilt Eggs (2006). Duggan first appeared on screen as Lauren Branning in the BBC soap opera EastEnders on 3 July 2006. She was dropped from the series in May 2010 by executive producer Bryan Kirkwood, and was replaced by Jacqueline Jossa.

In October 2011, it was announced that she would be starring in the feature film Everyone's Going To Die.

In April 2020, she revealed that she was now working part-time in a doctor's surgery because "being an out of work actress doesn't pay".

In 2020, amid the COVID-19 crisis, Duggan joined a supergroup of celebrities called The Celebs, which includes Frank Bruno and X Factor winner Sam Bailey to raise money for both Alzheimer's Society and Action for Children. They recorded a new rendition of "Merry Christmas Everyone" by Shakin' Stevens, and it was released digitally on 11 December 2020 on independent record label Saga Entertainment. The music video debuted exclusively on Good Morning Britain the day before release. The song peaked at number two on the iTunes pop chart.

== Filmography ==
=== Feature film ===
| Year | Title | Role | Notes |
|---|---|---|---|
| 2013 | Everyone's Going to Die | Laura | |
| 2019 | Maybe I'm Fine | Bar Manager | |

=== Short film ===
| Year | Title | Role | Notes |
|---|---|---|---|
| 2004 | Between Us | Amanda | |
| 2006 | Spoilt Eggs | Ellie | |

=== Television ===
| Year | Title | Role | Notes |
|---|---|---|---|
| 2006–2010 | EastEnders | Lauren Branning | 256 episodes |
| 2009 | Dani's House | Kathy | |
| 2010 | Rules of Love | Emily | Television film |
| 2012 | Silent Witness | Amy Chester | 2 episodes |
| 2013 | Dates | Waitress | Episode: "Mia & David" |
| 2013 | By Any Means | Robin Tyler | 1 episode |
| 2014 | The Smoke | Fiona Spencer | 2 episodes |
| 2014 | Rosamunde Pilcher | Darcy Sampson | Episode: "Mein unbekanntes Herz" |
| 2016 | The Tunnel | Tanya | 1 episode |
| 2017 | Home Alone | Katie | Episode: "Portrait of a Stalker" |
| 2019 | Doctor Who: The Further Adventures | Sash (voice) | |

=== Music video ===
| Year | Title | Role | Notes |
|---|---|---|---|
| 2012 | Feeder | "Borders" | |
| 2012 | Shaduno | "Funhouse" | |
| 2020 | The Celebs | "Merry Christmas Everyone" | |
