= Stefan Booth =

English actor, singer (b. 1979)

- Born: Stefan Booth; 4 October 1979 (age 46)
- Occupations: Actor, singer
- Years active: 2001–present

Stefan Booth (born 4 October 1979) is an English actor and singer, best known for playing Greg Jessop in the BBC soap opera EastEnders from 1 October 2010 to 21 October 2011.

== Career ==
Booth played Jamie Nash in Hollyoaks from 2001 until 2002 and also appeared as a semi-regular character, Sergeant Marc Rollins, in The Bill. In 2006, he came second in the ITV ice skating competition Dancing on Ice, partnered with professional ice skater Kristina Lenko.

On 20 May 2006, Booth appeared on a celebrity episode of The Weakest Link, featuring famous faces from the worlds of music and dance. He was the third one voted off. In August 2006, he filmed a guest part in an episode of The Royal in Scarborough.

Booth appeared as a guest vocalist on a number of tracks by CLSM and other UK Hardcore artists in the mid-2000s.

Booth has appeared in pantomime, playing the title role in Dick Whittington in 2006 at the Gordon Craig Theatre in Stevenage, Hertfordshire with Sheila Ferguson. He appeared in Back in Business, a 2007 comedy film as Travis Marks, the son of an ex con-man.

Booth appeared in pantomime at the Devonshire Park Theatre in Eastbourne, East Sussex from 12 December 2008 to 11 January 2009 in Snow White and the Seven Dwarfs starring as the Prince, with Niamh Perry.

In 2009, Booth appeared in the music video for James D Ingram's debut single "Looking For Love" produced by Dave Loughran and released on Motivation Records.

In 2010, Booth guested on the BBC One soap opera Doctors in January and in four-part drama The Silence in July.

Booth joined EastEnders in October 2010 as Greg Jessop, the fiancé of Tanya Branning (Jo Joyner). His character was axed in August 2011, but returned for a single episode on 21 October 2011.

Booth appeared as 'Prince Stefan' in Snow White at the Redditch Palace Theatre from 5 to 31 December 2011. He also starred in the 2012 production of Chicago: The Musical, playing Billy Flynn.
