= EastEnders Live Week =

Series of live EastEnders episodes in 2015

- EastEnders episodes
- Bobby is revealed to be Lucy's killer in a live flashback episode.
- Episode nos.: Episodes 5015–5020
- Directed by: Karl Neilson
- Written by: Matt Evans; Lauren Klee; Rob Gittins; Jesse O'Mahoney; James Payne
- Original air date: 17–20 February 2015
- Running time: 185 minutes (2x30; 1x55; 2x35)

Episode chronology
← Previous; Episode 5014	Next → Episode 5021

EastEnders Live Week (also known as EastEnders: The Week of Revelations) is a set of five EastEnders episodes including live elements, which was broadcast from 17 to 20 February 2015 to mark the programme's 30th anniversary.

The episodes were broadcast on BBC One and simulcast to Irish viewers on RTÉ One. The week was based around the second wedding of Ian (Adam Woodyatt) and Jane Beale (Laurie Brett), whilst concluding the "Who Killed Lucy Beale?" storyline and featuring elements of the aftermath of Nick Cotton's (John Altman) demise, after he collapsed in his mother Dot Branning's (June Brown) arms having injected himself with impure heroin on 13 February. The week also featured Kim Fox-Hubbard (Tameka Empson) giving birth to her daughter Pearl two months prematurely, the continuing fall-out from Dean Wicks's (Matt Di Angelo) rape of Linda Carter (Kellie Bright) and the shock return of Ian's mother Kathy Sullivan (Gillian Taylforth), who was presumed dead in 2006.

== Plot ==
All episodes were set on the day of Ian (Adam Woodyatt) and Jane Beale's (Laurie Brett) wedding. Each episode included live "inserts" before broadcasting a full live episode on 20 February. There were two episodes broadcast on 19 February; following its usual broadcast, the show aired a flashback episode, in which viewers were shown the hours leading up to Lucy Beale's (Hetti Bywater) death (see "Who Killed Lucy Beale?").

=== 17 February 2015 ===
The residents of Albert Square are haunted by the death of Lucy as Ian and Jane's wedding dawns over Walford. Lauren Branning's (Jacqueline Jossa) quest to out the killer continues. She gives Jane the wedding card; however, Jane is shocked when it is revealed what Lauren wrote – "I know what happened to Lucy. She was killed at home."

Meanwhile, Phil Mitchell (Steve McFadden) returns to Albert Square with Billy Mitchell (Perry Fenwick) and Peggy Mitchell (Barbara Windsor) by his side. Phil is determined to find Ian, as he has found something that he should know, but it soon becomes apparent that Phil and Billy have been followed by a mysterious man named Vincent Hubbard (Richard Blackwood). He approaches them in search of Ronnie Mitchell (Samantha Womack) before going to the hospital, leaving a single rose for her. It is also the day that Ronnie is due to be woken up from her coma following a car crash on New Year's Day. The doctors are successful when she starts breathing on her own, and an overwhelmed Roxy Mitchell (Rita Simons) tells Charlie Cotton (Declan Bennett) not to breathe a word of their recent one-night stand; Ronnie awakens as the conversation happens.

Meanwhile, Peggy confronts Dot Branning (June Brown) over her son, Nick Cotton (John Altman), framing Phil for causing the crash, only to learn that Nick has died. Peggy comforts Dot and invites her to move in with her and her son Grant Mitchell (Ross Kemp) in Portugal. Later, Peggy visits The Queen Vic and meets its new landlord, Mick Carter (Danny Dyer), who tells her to "get out of my pub", which Peggy was known for saying as landlady. As Phil procures a passport for Peggy, she warns him that his wife Sharon Mitchell (Letitia Dean) will find out about his plans. As Ian waits for Jane at the wedding ceremony, Phil arrives to talk to him.

A worried Stacey Branning (Lacey Turner) informs Max Branning (Jake Wood) that Lauren knows what happened to Lucy. Max is unnerved and, when Abi Branning (Lorna Fitzgerald) confronts him, he tells her that Lauren knows that she killed Lucy.

=== 18 February 2015 ===
Phil is about to explain to Ian what he has found out, but, after Ben Mitchell (Harry Reid) walks in on their conversation, he cannot do it. After some encouragement from Christian Clarke (John Partridge) and an appearance from Tanya Cross (Jo Joyner), Jane makes it to the restaurant where, after some hesitation, she makes her vows to Ian.

Meanwhile, Max and Abi find out that Lauren is at an abortion clinic. Max follows her, while Abi waits nervously at the wedding. Max tries to talk some sense into Lauren, expressing his mistakes as a father, as it is the fifth anniversary of the night that his first son Bradley Branning (Charlie Clements) fell to his death from The Queen Vic, but he insists that the father has a right to be involved in Lauren's pregnancy. He is unable to get through to her; she goes ahead with the consultation meeting, but Peter Beale (Ben Hardy) interrupts her, having been alerted by Abi. He tells Lauren that he would be a good father and would support her through all her issues. Lauren replies that she is confused by what to do, before confessing to Peter what she knows about Lucy. Max returns home and shouts at Abi, whilst Tanya walks in and demands to know what is going on. Max is hesitant, but Abi tells her the truth and denies that she killed Lucy, but that she did have a fight with her.

Dot confesses to an unconscious Ronnie about what she has done, but, as she is revealing all, she is overheard by Charlie and Arthur "Fatboy" Chubb (Ricky Norwood). Dot then confesses all to them, as well, but, before she can finish, Charlie announces that he is going to kill Nick and Dot states that she has already done so.

During a toast at the reception in The Queen Vic, Jane returns home where she calls Masood Ahmed (Nitin Ganatra) over with Bobby Beale (Eliot Carrington) and asks him to take the boy to his home. Ian catches up with Jane, and Peter walks in with Cindy Williams (Mimi Keene) and says he thinks that it was Cindy, Ian or Jane who killed Lucy.

=== 19 February 2015 ===
==== "Look Back in Anger" ====
At the reception, Kim Fox-Hubbard (Tameka Empson) has been feeling pain in her stomach and goes into premature labour in The Queen Vic's toilets after a heated argument with her sister, Denise Fox (Diane Parish). As Denise phones for an ambulance, she calls Sonia Fowler (Natalie Cassidy) and Tina Carter (Luisa Bradshaw-White) to help Kim. With assistance from the three, Kim gives birth to a baby daughter and names her Pearl, as she is so small and precious. As Kim is about to leave for the hospital, she tells Denise that she is to blame for her unexpected arrival and that she does not want anyone near her and her baby.

When Sharon confronts Phil over his recent behaviour, he tells her that he has been receiving a lot of money, but says no more than that, and Sharon pressures him to focus on his family and his businesses, and to stay away from dealings that would see him in prison. As Phil has his conversation with Sharon, he receives several texts from an unknown person. Away from the square, Phil arranges to meet up with the unknown person, who is revealed to be his former wife Kathy Sullivan (Gillian Taylforth), who has been presumed dead for nine years. Phil tells her that, despite her wishes, he cannot allow her to return home, concerned about the effect on Ben and Ian.

Away from the reception, Stacey, Martin Fowler (James Bye) and Kush Kazemi (Davood Ghadami) find Nick's body in 23 Albert Square. They realise that Dot knew and that they have to call the police. Peter's family are stunned following his shocking revelation and he, Cindy, Jane and Ian all start to suspect one another, before Cindy points out that Denise was living in the house at that time. Peter asks Ian to go to confront her and, after hesitating, he leaves to find Denise, only to be distracted by the drama at Dot's. Dot confesses all to Sharon and Ian, admitting that she let Nick die as a punishment for his crimes and urging Ian to be wary of his own family.

At the café, Tanya reveals to Max that she is taking part in a fashion course in Manchester and asks Max if Oscar can move in with him for a while, as he would be stuck with a nanny most of the time if he went with her, due to Tanya's commitment to the course. Tanya also explains her concerns about Abi's recent troubling behaviour leading to being accused of killing Lucy, and she and Max end up arguing over whether each other are to blame for this. Before leaving, Tanya admits to Jane that she was thinking of rebuilding her relationship with Max, but Jane assures her that that would have been one of the biggest mistakes of her life.

Mick reveals to Nancy Carter (Maddy Hill) that he has seen Dean Wicks (Matt Di Angelo) in Albert Square and goes to look for him, without success. Outside, he runs into Ian, who is reflecting on Lucy's death and says he now knows who killed Lucy. Dean gains entry to the cellar of the pub armed with a jerry can of petrol. Nancy discovers him and he takes her hostage, but she is released after Mick finds them. Dean repeats that he is not a rapist and does not want to hurt anyone, but wants revenge by burning down the pub. However, before Dean can light the petrol, Mick attacks him with a fire extinguisher before pressing on his throat with his foot, leaving Dean unconscious.

Charlie convinces Sharon, Ian, Fatboy, Martin, Kush and Stacey to help him get rid of Nick's body so no one would believe what Dot is saying and she can avoid arrest. However, while they find Les Coker (Roger Sloman) and Carol Jackson (Lindsey Coulson) to devise a plan, Dot phones the police and confesses to Nick's death. After showing DI Samantha Keeble (Alison Newman) where Nick's body is, she is taken in for questioning.

Later, Peter confronts Denise himself and Ian stops him stating that she did not kill Lucy. After Peter returns home to Cindy and Jane, the phone begins to ring, with all three reluctant to answer. Ian, meanwhile, has a phone conversation with a mystery person and tells them that he knows they killed Lucy and to get everyone out, as he is coming home. Ian returns home, finding Jane and asks her to tell him exactly what happened on the night that Lucy died.

==== Flashback episode ====
The episode casts back to the night of Lucy's murder. The puzzle begins to piece itself together, and previous mysteries are reaching a conclusion. Whitney Dean (Shona McGarty) continues to envy Lucy after she slept with her crush, Lee Carter (Danny-Boy Hatchard). Lucy catches Billy stealing fish from the chip shop and the pair arguing are seen by Lee, during which Billy suggests that they take their relationship further. Lucy then makes her way to the flat to meet a client and boards the same bus as Jay Brown (Jamie Borthwick). As she alights the bus, her brother Peter is seen meeting up with a drug dealer to score cocaine for her. Lucy is unhappy when Jay and Ben appear at the flat, with Ben demanding that she get rid of the client so that they can talk. The client is revealed to be a drunken Jake Stone (Jamie Lomas), who is looking to restart his fling with Lauren. She takes pity on him and the pair take an unlicensed mini cab home.

Back in Walford, the driver leaves Lucy to take care of him after seeing the state of Jake. While Max walks the dog, he comes across the pair and helps Lucy get Jake inside; unknown to him, he has been followed by Abi, who sees this. Inside, Jake attempts to attack Max and accidentally punches Lucy causing her to lose an earring and have a nose bleed. Meanwhile, Ronnie obtains a gun from Vincent and the pair are revealed to be old flames. Ben and Jay also return to Walford, and Jay encourages Ben to see Phil. In retaliation for Lucy cancelling a trip to Miami, Ben confronts her and steals her belongings.

Left with nothing, Lucy returns home, but, on her way, meets Abi, who confronts her about her relationship with Max before attacking Lucy. Abi returns home following the incident and happily tells Max what she has done. Billy attempts to get rid of the fish and his pictures of Lucy, but is interrupted by Peter, causing him to hide the images under the fridge. After Billy discreetly gets rid of the fish, Peter expresses his feelings about Lucy being the favourite child, before deciding that she is on her own and discarding Lucy's drugs.

As Lucy arrives home, she has a heart-to-heart with Jane. Upon going inside, she overhears a conversation in which Denise tells her daughter Chelsea Fox (Tiana Benjamin) that she is going to leave Ian. Lucy is angered by this and orders her to leave immediately, which results in the two fighting, which Bobby overhears. Cindy, Ian and Lee are then seen making voicemails on Lucy's phone while she sits outside of the Beale house. Upon going back in, Lucy with her jewellery box on the table writes an note, but is interrupted.

Jane and Masood, meanwhile, have been arguing all evening about Jane rushing to the Beale house to help resolve various issues. When her phone rings again, Masood storms off assuming it is Ian. When Jane answers, she calms down the person on the other end and arrives at the Beale house. Jane finds the front door ajar and Lucy on the floor of the living room. Upon checking Lucy for vital signs, she realises that she is dead and turns to find Bobby holding Lucy's jewellery box.

=== 20 February 2015 ===
This episode returns to the present day, with Ian confronting Jane over what happened to Lucy. Jane continues to cover for Bobby by saying that she killed Lucy, causing Ian to become distressed. When Peter and Cindy return to the house, Jane begins to go into her version of the details of what happened, but Ian realises she is lying when he sees that Bobby has tried to reach Jane, and thus did the same on the night that Lucy died. Jane reveals that she convinced Bobby that it was someone else that had killed Lucy, and that she carried Lucy lovingly to the place where her body would be found. During the confession, Phil enters the house and tries to tell Ian about Kathy being alive, but Ian sends him away.

Meanwhile, Mick and Nancy are unable to find signs of life from Dean, and leave the cellar locked in a panic. As the two are frightened by the prospect of being arrested, Mick urges Nancy to assist with the reception while he gets rid of Dean's body and establishes an alibi. When a shaken Mick returns, he and Nancy try to tell Linda Carter (Kellie Bright) what happened. However, before they can say anything, Linda proposes to Mick, who accepts. This sparks calls for more champagne leading to the discovery of the locked door. When a key is found, the cellar is discovered to be a mess, but with no sign of Dean. Nancy asks Mick where Dean is, but he refuses to tell her.

Ian calls Bobby over to tell him what he did, but changes his mind after Jane tells him to view it from her perspective. Ian returns and insists that the whole family must deal with the situation together, which everyone agrees to, except Peter who storms out during the ensuing argument, saying that he will never forgive his father. Bobby overhears the argument and drops Lucy's note, which Cindy discovers when she goes to find him, while Ian and Jane insist that Bobby should not discover the truth and they start their marriage anew. Cindy reads Lucy's note to Ian and Jane, and, when Bobby returns, the four embrace.

== Cast and characters ==
- Nitin Ganatra as Masood Ahmed
- Kim Vithana as Dr. Margaret Badini
- Eliot Carrington as Bobby Beale
- Adam Woodyatt as Ian Beale
- Laurie Brett as Jane Beale
- Hetti Bywater as Lucy Beale
- Ben Hardy as Peter Beale
- Lorna Fitzgerald as Abi Branning
- June Brown as Dot Branning
- Jacqueline Jossa as Lauren Branning
- Aine Garvey as Lily Branning
- Jake Wood as Max Branning
- Lacey Turner as Stacey Branning
- Jamie Borthwick as Jay Brown
- James Forde as Liam Butcher
- Danny-Boy Hatchard as Lee Carter
- Kellie Bright as Linda Carter
- Danny Dyer as Mick Carter
- Maddy Hill as Nancy Carter
- Linda Henry as Shirley Carter
- Timothy West as Stan Carter
- Luisa Bradshaw-White as Tina Carter
- Ricky Norwood as Arthur "Fatboy" Chubb
- John Partridge as Christian Clarke
- Roger Sloman as Les Coker
- Lin Blakley as Pam Coker
- Declan Bennett as Charlie Cotton
- John Altman as Nick Cotton
- Ann Mitchell as Cora Cross
- Tanya Franks as Rainie Cross
- Jo Joyner as Tanya Cross
- Shona McGarty as Whitney Dean
- James Bye as Martin Fowler
- Natalie Cassidy as Sonia Fowler
- Diane Parish as Denise Fox
- Tameka Empson as Kim Fox-Hubbard
- Richard Blackwood as Vincent Hubbard
- Lindsey Coulson as Carol Jackson
- Davood Ghadami as Kush Kazemi
- Alison Newman as DI Samantha Keeble
- Tomasz Aleksander as Arsim Kelmendi
- Rakhee Thakrar as Shabnam Masood
- Himesh Patel as Tamwar Masood
- Abbie Knowles as Amy Mitchell
- Harry Reid as Ben Mitchell
- Perry Fenwick as Billy Mitchell
- Grace as Janet Mitchell
- Barbara Windsor as Peggy Mitchell
- Steve McFadden as Phil Mitchell
- Samantha Womack as Ronnie Mitchell
- Rita Simons as Roxy Mitchell
- Letitia Dean as Sharon Mitchell
- Shane Richie as Alfie Moon
- Jessie Wallace as Kat Moon
- Danielle Harold as Lola Pearce
- Kristian Kiehling as Aleks Shirovs
- Gledisa Osmani as Ineta Shirovs
- Annette Badland as Babe Smith
- Jamie Lomas as Jake Stone
- Gillian Taylforth as Kathy Sullivan
- Jane Slaughter as Tracey
- Rudolph Walker as Patrick Trueman
- Mimi Keene as Cindy Williams
- Matt Di Angelo as Dean Wicks
- Lisa Hammond as Donna Yates

== Background ==
Show bosses confirmed on 1 October 2014 that EastEnders would air a full 30-minute live episode to celebrate 30 years of EastEnders and culminate the "Who Killed Lucy Beale?" storyline. It was also confirmed that all other episodes in the week would include live inserts. This was the third time that the show had aired a live episode, the first time being for the 25th anniversary episode, and the second time when Billy Mitchell carried the Olympic flame. Treadwell-Collins stated the live week as being "a fantastic opportunity for EastEnders to create a massive national event, and one that will enable us to celebrate 30 years of [the show] in spectacular style." He went on to say that the live inserts allow them to "surprise" the audience. "It is ambitious and exciting, and something I know everyone at EastEnders will excel at."

BBC One's controller Charlotte Moore said: "BBC One will bring the nation together to celebrate 30 years of EastEnders by going live across the anniversary week. Next February will mark a massive event on the channel by creating the ultimate 'doof doof' and finally reveal who killed Lucy Beale." Ben Stephenson, controller of drama commissioning at the BBC, added: "After a captivating year of drama in 2014, EastEnders will top this in February 2015 with the most ambitious anniversary any soap has attempted. 'Live week' allows us to keep loads of secrets from the cast, crew and the audience until the very last minute. With shocking reveals and unguessable twists, it's going to be a week that will change Albert Square forever."

== Production ==
The week featured four thirty-minute episodes, including one flashback episode set on Good Friday 2014, and one sixty-minute episode. All episodes featured live portions, with Friday's episode being broadcast live in its entirety. The week also featured a recreation of the first scene of EastEnders, including use of sound effects from 1985 as three residents find Nick Cotton (John Altman) dead. Dominic Treadwell-Collins stated that there had been sickness within the cast and crew in the buildup to the event and that there is no contingency plan if an actor is unavailable. He added that unlike pre-recorded television, the reveal of Lucy's killer cannot be contained by having multiple endings recorded or withholding the scripts and the fact that the killer is not exposed in one line, like had been the case with the reveal of Archie Mitchell's (Larry Lamb) murderer in a live episode that broadcast in 2010.

=== Filming ===
The episodes were directed by Karl Neilson, who has worked on the show for twenty years. In an interview with Digital Spy, he stated: "I spoke to [executive producer] Dominic [Treadwell-Collins] about it in August last year. I'd been working very hard to get this block of episodes - I really wanted to do them because it's my own 20th anniversary this year of working on the show. I knew that these episodes were going to be massive, so I did do a good pitch to try and get the job! They came to me in August and said that I would be directing and I was thrilled. I then started working on the episodes at the beginning of November." After Tuesday's filming had been completed a small fire broke out on the set, the cause of which was a firework. The fire took place on the first floor and roof space of one of the buildings, but it did not cause any immediate production changes. Later it was revealed to be a firework from the end of Friday's episode during a rehearsal.

=== Cast and characters ===
Along with the regular cast, Barbara Windsor and John Partridge returned on 17 February, reprising their roles as Peggy Mitchell and Christian Clarke respectively; Peggy left during the same episode, while Christian appeared until the end of the week. Jo Joyner returned on 18 February as Tanya Cross and appeared in episodes until 20 February, where her character again departed. Hetti Bywater (Lucy Beale), Jamie Lomas (Jake Stone) and Tanya Franks (Rainie Cross) all returned to participate in the flashback episode. Richard Blackwood made his EastEnders debut during a live scene in Tuesday's episode, credited as Vincent. Gillian Taylforth made a shock return as Kathy Beale on 19 February 2015 in a live segment.

After the reveal of Lucy's killer aired, Treadwell-Collins revealed that Eliot Carrington, who portrays Bobby Beale, found out that his character was responsible on Monday 16 February. Bywater mentioned that she found out eight hours prior to the reveal, when she turned up to rehearse the scene. Adam Woodyatt (Ian Beale), Laurie Brett (Jane Beale), Mimi Keene (Cindy Williams) and Ben Hardy (Peter Beale) were told prior to Christmas, in order to film scenes for episodes that will air after live week. Following Friday's live episode, it was revealed that it was the last day that Hardy and Timothy West (Stan Carter) were due to film for EastEnders, as they had already filmed their characters' final scenes, although Hardy later re-shot his final scene with Carrington as Peter and Bobby for the Tuesday 24 February episode. Jacqueline Jossa (Lauren Branning), who had also filmed her departure scenes alongside Hardy in December 2014 prior to going on maternity leave, was originally scheduled to appear during the live segments, but the birth of her daughter on Sunday 15 February meant that she was unavailable for the live broadcast; Lauren only appeared during the pre-recorded segments.

=== Continuity ===
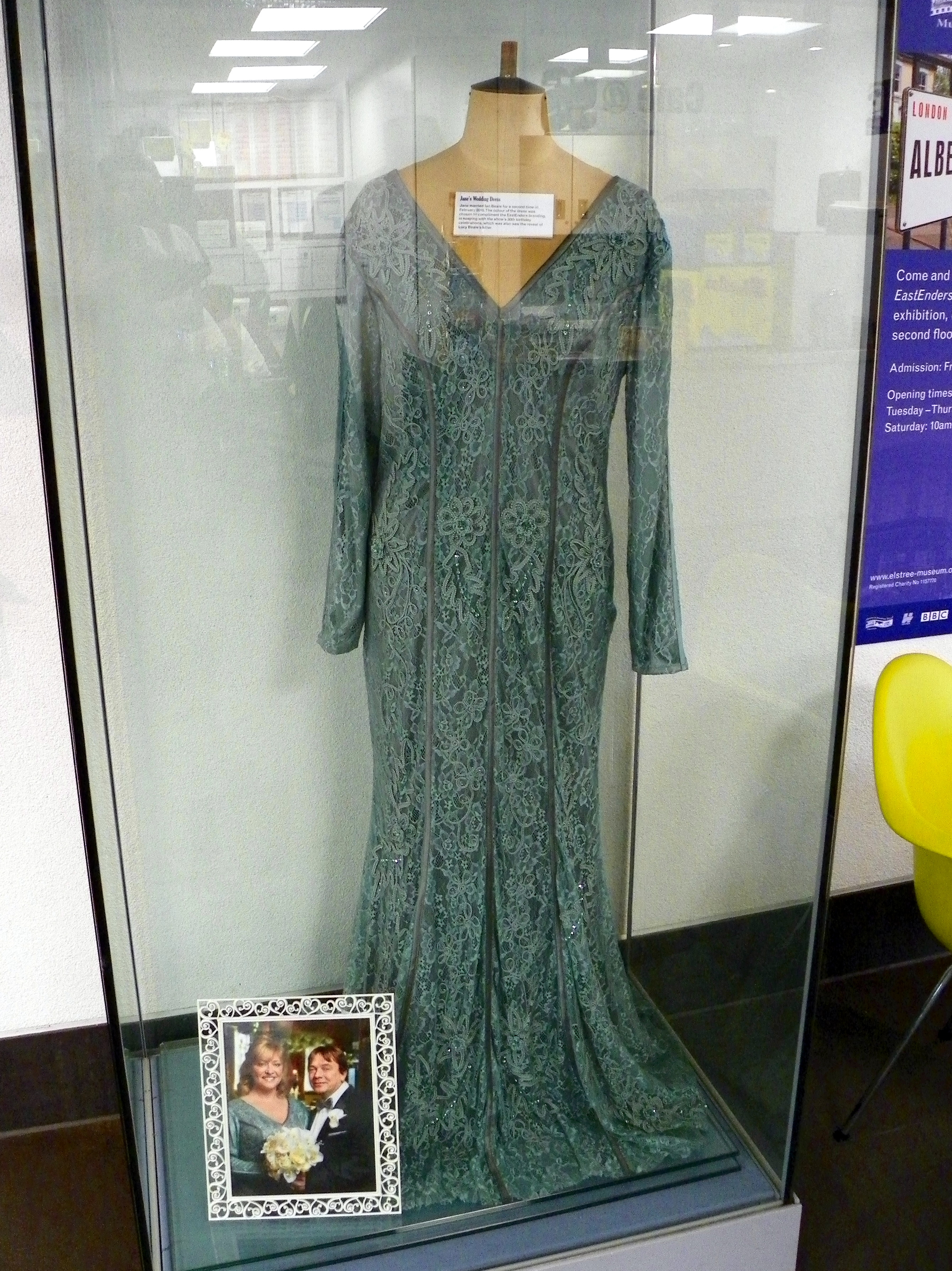
The wedding dress (on display at the Elstree and Borehamwood Museum in Hertfordshire) worn during EastEnders Live Week" by Laurie Brett as Jane Beale, for the character's second wedding to Ian Beale, played by Adam Woodyatt. The dress was designed to match the colours of the show's opening credits.

Laurie Brett, who plays Jane Beale, wore a silver and grey dress for the character's marriage to Ian Beale (Adam Woodyatt), which were specifically chosen in order to reflect the colours of the EastEnders opening titles. The third episode of the week contained a scene which directly mirrored that of the show's first scene, in which Reg Cox (Johnnie Clayton) was found dead in an abandoned 23 Albert Square. This also included the recreation of certain sound effects and the repetition of the first line of the show which was spoken by Den Watts (Leslie Grantham). During the flashback episode, Vincent Hubbard (Richard Blackwood) gave his counterpart Ronnie Mitchell (Samantha Womack) a bouquet of flowers containing a gun for her, a reference to the on-screen 'death' of Den, who was shot by a man carrying a gun that was hidden in a bunch of daffodils.

The celebrations also featured many outside references. Kim Fox-Hubbard (Tameka Empson) named her daughter "Pearl", which is the traditional stone to celebrate 30th anniversaries. As well as this, all the music that was played during the week were songs that were in the charts in 1985, the year that EastEnders began. During a special montage in Friday's 30-minute live episode, the camera focused on a plan of Walford which had the names of co-creators Julia Smith and Tony Holland etched inside a heart directly above it.

=== Related media ===
Unlike the 25th anniversary, the 30th has been largely influenced by social networking sites. The Twitter hashtag #EELive appeared on screen in live inserts in order to aid viewers into knowing which scenes are live and which scenes are pre-recorded. Also, Himesh Patel tweeted as his character Tamwar Masood during live broadcasts under the hashtag #TamwarTweets, giving the viewers an in-soap experience of Ian and Jane's wedding night. The saga was heavily promoted in the weeks running up to it. Three trailers were released: The first on 26 January, and a further two on 13 February 2015. Two radio trailers were also unveiled on 4 February 2015, both of which aired on BBC Radio 1. On 17 February, it was revealed that Danny Dyer, who plays Mick Carter in the soap, would be making pre-recorded safety announcements on the London Underground at Bromley-By-Bow station to celebrate the 30th anniversary.

== Reception ==
=== Ratings ===
The first episode on 17 February received overnight figures amounting to 9.03 million, the highest overnight EastEnders figure since 1 January 2013. The following episode dropped to 8.88 million viewers. On 19 February, the show received 10.84 and 10.30 million for the first and second episodes respectively, receiving a peak as high as 11.90 million as the murder mystery unraveled. Thursday's episodes broke social media records twice. The first episode saw 508,678 tweets sent, while the flashback episode broke that record with 519,359 making it the most tweeted about episode of a UK soap. The live episode on 20 February 2015 received 9.97 million viewers.

Seven day viewing figures show that the first episode on 17 February received 9.84 million, the second episode on 18 February received 9.61 million, the third episode on 19 February received 11.33 million, the fourth and special flashback episode received 11.57 million and the entirely live fifth episode on 20 February received 10.94 million. The second episode on 19 February made "EastEnders" the fifth most viewed programme of 2015.

=== Critical response ===
The episodes generated controversy on social media websites after Jake Wood, who plays Max Branning, supposedly slurred his lines during one of the live inserts, whilst Jo Joyner also received social media attention after calling Ian Beale by his actor's name, Adam. Joyner later revealed that after the incident she suffered a panic attack and asked the producers to show a pre recorded version of the wedding ceremony and added that the next night where she had four live scenes was the hardest thing she had to do. While Laurie Brett, who she said the line to, stated that she had nothing to say in response and the reaction would have been the same, making the audience think that Ian killed Lucy. The second episode aired on 18 February and received 8.88 million viewers, a slight drop from its predecessor. Following the reveal that Bobby Beale was Lucy's killer Ofcom received five complaints about the storyline with one commenting that there was no helpline for viewers affected at the end of the episode. The BBC also had four complaints about being misled to who the killer may have been.

On 19 February RTÉ One Aired the hour-long episode from 7.30pm however they were planning on showing the flashback episode the next day at 7.30 to precede the fully live episode so they could show a highly anticipated live interview with the Taoiseach. When RTÉ learned the significance of the episode a decision was made to simulcast the flashback episode with the BBC so the identity of Lucy's killer was not spoiled for viewers and pushed the live interview with the Taoiseach until 10pm. The next day a couple of furious RTÈ viewers phoned Joe Duffy on Liveline, appalled at the decision to delay an interview with Irelands Taoiseach, in order to show EastEnders instead.

Thursday's episodes were described by the Guardian's Hannah Verdier as so much more than just unleashing the whodunnit. Verdier noted that the Fox sisters had their finest moment in a furious confrontation in The Queen Vic. Danny Dyer was described as on form by Verdier and noted that the character of Kat provided light to his shade. She also commented that the most shocking revelation of the night was that Kathy Beale was alive. Following Friday's live episode Verdier noted, that every cast member had performed a blinder and that one could forget that it was live. However she felt that the end was cheesy drawing attention away from the Beale house. On the week as a whole she notes that critics may not be a fan of the Lucy reveal, especially if the Beale family get away with it but for fans it had everything that one wanted from the show. Chris Bennon in the Independent noted that Adam Woodyatt "excelled more than ever" in a role he has played for 30 years. He also commented that a special mention was needed for Eliot Carrington, who is only 12, who held his own against senior actors in this tricky environment. Writing for the Metro online, Vicky Prior, stated that producers were not far wrong when they said that the square would never be the same again in the buildup to the week. Prior states that Woodyatt's performance was of the type only seen by those who are Knights or Dames. She also praised Mimi Keene and Eliot Carrington, calling the pair outstanding and that they seemed unfazed that the programme was live. Prior also praised Dominic Treadwell-Collins for turning the show around and making the 30th Anniversary a success.

Writing in the Telegraph, Michael Hogan noted that Thursday's hour-long episode was slow and stagey to reveal Jane as the killer. Hogan noted that the reveal was the "marquee event of a masterfully managed anniversary week;" and loved the nostalgic touches throughout the week. He also noted that despite being 88, June Brown was still superb, but felt that there were a few too many sub plots and that although Kathy Beale's return was gasp out loud it was superfluous to the story. Brendan O'Neill noted that Thursday's reveal was a thrilling return to form for the show. Continuing he noted that "good drama should occasionally cause jaws to drop and, yes, even invite us to "go dark" or "go daft."" Before concluding that it made a change from the usual moral education route. Hogan noted that thankfully nothing went wrong in Friday's live episode and instead we got a "triumphant, heartbreaking half-hour of television." Hogan noted that the acting was faultless and singled out Woodyatt, Brett and Dyer noting that they were superb and stated that he was impressed with the younger members of the cast (Hardy, Hill, Carrington and Keene).

== Special broadcasts ==
EastEnders aired two spin-off shows to celebrate thirty years of the show. Back to Ours was a bi-weekly online/Red Button series inspired by Gogglebox, in which several cast members watched and reflected upon some of their most well-known scenes. The other programme was titled 30 Years of Cliffhangers, and counted down the characters who had appeared in the most cliffhangers in the show's history, with Phil Mitchell (Steve McFadden) appearing in the most. The Graham Norton Show aired a special EastEnders themed episode on 16 February, featuring appearances from past and present cast members. In addition, the programme's first episode was broadcast on BBC Red Button, as was the episode that originally aired on 18 April 2014, which depicted Lucy Beale's death. Following the live episode on 20 February 2015, Zoe Ball, Ore Oduba and Joe Swash presented an aftermath programme called EastEnders: Backstage Live.

== Scripts ==
In March 2015, BBC bosses released online copies of the five episode scripts used throughout Live Week. As these were post-production scripts, the copies included Joyner's minor slip-up and Kathy's surprise return scenes. All scripts were made available for download.
