= Nancy Carter =

Fictional character from EastEnders

- EastEnders character
- Portrayed by: Maddy Hill
- Duration: 2014–2016, 2021–2022, 2024, 2026
- First appearance: Episode 4775/4776; 1 January 2014
- Created by: Dominic Treadwell-Collins
- Introduced by: Dominic Treadwell-Collins (2014); Jon Sen (2021); Chris Clenshaw (2024); Ben Wadey (2026)
In-universe information
- Occupation: Barmaid; Market trader; Personal trainer
- Father: Mick Carter
- Mother: Linda Carter
- Stepmother: Janine Butcher
- Brothers: Lee Carter; Johnny Carter; Ollie Carter
- Half-sisters: Frankie Lewis; Annie Carter
- Husband: Tamwar Masood (2019–2021)
- Grandfathers: Buster Briggs; John Peacock
- Grandmothers: Shirley Carter; Elaine Peacock
- Uncles: Dean Wicks
- Nephews: Michael Carter
- First cousins: Jade Masood
- Other relatives: Stan Carter; Sylvie Carter; Tina Carter; Babe Smith

Nancy Carter is a fictional character from the BBC soap opera EastEnders, played by Maddy Hill. Nancy's first appearance is in a combination of the show's 4775th and 4776th episodes, originally broadcast in the United Kingdom on 1 January 2014. A member of the Carter family, Nancy is the daughter of Mick (Danny Dyer) and Linda Carter (Kellie Bright). Her storylines include relationships with Wayne Ladlow (Malachi Kirby), Dexter Hartman (Khali Best) and Tamwar Masood (Himesh Patel), coping with the aftermath of her mother's rape, having epilepsy and a feud with her older brother Lee Carter (Danny Hatchard). It was announced that Maddy Hill would be leaving the show, with Nancy departing alongside Tamwar Masood (Himesh Patel) on 22 April 2016. Hill's return was announced in February 2021, and Nancy reappeared between 13 April 2021 and 23 June 2022, when Hill decided to leave the show once again. Hill was spotted filming with the cast and crew in October 2024, and she returned for a one-off appearance on 16 December 2024. Hill reprised the role again in 2026 reappearing once again as Nancy from 5 October, of the same year.

== Development ==
Hill's casting as Nancy was announced on 29 October 2013, on which the actress said: "I feel incredibly privileged to have been given such an amazing opportunity and I can't wait to start work with such a talented cohort of actors". Nancy is described as a stubborn and fiery 21-year-old tomboy that is a disappointment to her mother. However, she is also an "extremely caring and loyal friend" although she brings trouble with her. Hill described Nancy as "boisterous", a "total tomboy" and "pretty good at sports". Hill opined that the storyline involving Wayne, and his subsequent exit scenes were "too satisfying to film". She said, Nancy's not too bothered about Wayne at this point. She knows her parents don't like him so Nancy was basically just vying for their attention. In any case, I think that Nancy's always known she was too bright for Wayne". Khali Best, who plays Dexter Hartman, has stated that he has "got a lot of stuff coming up with Nancy", opining that the two characters "would work well", however Hill has played this down saying, "I've been asking Dom [Treadwell-Collins] to tell me what is going to happen, but he won't say anything".

=== Epilepsy ===
It was revealed that Nancy had epilepsy and that Maddy Hill was terrified of the plot. Maddy stated "When I first found out that Nancy had epilepsy, I was absolutely terrified, just because I knew nothing about the illness. I didn't know anyone who had epilepsy and I was very aware of wanting to be respectful to people who suffer with such a massive thing in day-to-day life." Magazine Epilepsy Today stated "Nancy's seizures are a brave step for the show and are becoming a dramatic fixture in the EastEnders landscape."

=== Departure (2016) ===
On 12 March 2016, it was announced that Hill and Patel would both be leaving their roles as Nancy and Tamwar respectively. Hill said of her decision to leave, "It was time for Nancy to take a break from her family and me from EastEnders after having a wonderful time working on the show." Both characters made their last appearances on 22 April 2016.

=== Return (2021) ===
On 8 February 2021, it was announced that Hill would be reprising her role of Nancy. She stated that she was excited to be returning, commented that she was looking forward to "reconnecting with all the hilarious, warm, talented cast and crew and meeting some lovely new faces". She noted that she loved portraying the role of Nancy, and that she "often wondered what she's up to", adding that she is "grateful" to be back in the role. Executive producer Jon Sen opined his joy at having Nancy back on the soap, hinting that there is "a lot of mystery surrounding her return as she's coming back to a family that have been through a difficult year".

=== Second departure (2022) ===
On 23 June 2022, viewers saw Nancy leave the show once again once her relationships with Linda and Zack broke down. Hill's second exit from the soap was not announced previously. Once the episode aired, Hill commented: "It's been great revisiting Nancy and the Square over the past year but it felt like the right time to move on for now. I already miss everyone and feel so grateful to work with people I have so much love for." A spokesperson also wished Hill well for the future.

== Storylines ==
=== 2014–2016 ===
Nancy appears when she is about to marry Wayne Ladlow (Malachi Kirby) in Watford. Wayne is instantly disliked by her father Mick Carter (Danny Dyer) who carries the intended bride over his shoulder to their family-owned pub, The Queen Victoria where Nancy will live. Nancy continues to see Wayne in Walford. After punching Dexter Hartman (Khali Best) publicly, Nancy reveals during a family argument that her younger brother Johnny Carter (Sam Strike) is gay. Nancy realises that Wayne is showing private pictures of her to his friends and ends their relationship. Nancy collapses in the park with an epileptic seizure when she is with Dexter and during her recuperation under Dexter's care he declares that he finds Nancy attractive. Dexter follows Nancy when she goes down in to The Queen Vic cellar to change the barrel, she is impressed when he removes his T-shirt and they are interrupted before they start having sex when they hear groaning—Masood Ahmed (Nitin Ganatra) is on the floor of the pub's alleyway after being mugged. Nancy befriends Tamwar Masood (Himesh Patel) including providing him with a bed in the pub after his father, Masood, punches him. In May 2014, Dexter kisses Nancy, but she is unsure how to respond. Later on, Nancy walks in on her grandmother Shirley Carter (Linda Henry) and great-grandfather Stan Carter (Timothy West) arguing and collapses and has a second epileptic seizure, but is helped by Stan and Shirley.

Nancy continues working behind the bar. When Mick is accused of soliciting a prostitute, he convinces Nancy of his innocence and Nancy fights Lauren Branning (Jacqueline Jossa) over the accusations. Mick is revealed to have been covering for Ian Beale (Adam Woodyatt), and he publicly humiliates the prostitute involved, Rainie Cross (Tanya Franks), who Nancy gave money to when she was begging earlier in the day. Nancy accuses Mick of hating women for the way he spoke to Rainie. She also demands that in the future she is included in big decisions like covering for Ian, and he agrees. Nancy later discovers that her uncle (though believed to be her cousin) Dean Wicks (Matt Di Angelo) has been making advances against her mother Linda Carter (Kellie Bright), but fears that Linda is leading him on. However, Dean denies this and apologises to her and Linda. Nancy and Tamwar host "musical bingo" together at The Queen Vic, and she briefly reignites her fling with Dexter. Nancy is upset when her older brother Lee Carter (Danny Hatchard) attacks Ben Mitchell (Harry Reid), after he makes homophobic comments about Johnny, and fears his volatile behaviour after his service in the army. She is upset when Johnny leaves, but distracted by family issues as Mick attacks Dean, seemingly out of the blue, on Christmas Day 2014, and then leaves Nancy in charge as he takes some time away with Linda. As Dexter does not understand her family situation, she ends things with him but they later part on good terms after he gives her some heartfelt advice before he leaves. When her parents return, Linda confesses to Nancy that Dean raped her, which devastates her. She threatens Dean to stay away from her family. During a wedding reception at The Queen Vic, Nancy is taken hostage by Dean in the barrel store, as he tries to burn down the pub as revenge against the Carters. Mick gains the upper hand and stands on Dean's throat, and although Nancy stops him, they believe Dean is dead. However, when Nancy returns, Dean is gone, and although Mick claims Dean got up and left, she becomes fearful that her father killed Dean. Her suspicions worsen when a body is found matching Dean's description, and she nearly tells Shirley, although it is not Dean. Due to the stress of the situation, she has a grand mal seizure. After, she becomes distant with her parents, and breaks down to Tamwar about her family problems. They kiss, but Tamwar freaks out and she leaves, believing he does not like her. When she and Tamwar discover that market inspector Aleks Shirovs (Kristian Kiehling) has been stealing money from the market traders, Nancy encourages him to report Aleks to the authorities. Once he has done that, he nervously kisses her again in full view of the patrons in the pub. Although Tamwar is again flustered by it, this time, Nancy is grateful and they kiss again and begin dating.

After Nancy discovers an attraction between Stacey Slater (Lacey Turner) and Kush Kazemi (Davood Ghadami), despite him being engaged to Tamwar's sister Shabnam Masood (Rakhee Thakrar), she becomes distant from Tamwar and he assumes she has met someone else. She admits she is fine with the fact they do not have sex, but assumes it is because of his religion. Tamwar worries about bad scarring he received from a house fire, so suddenly walks out, and Nancy has a seizure. They agree to be open and honest with each other, so Tamwar shows her the scars, stating this is the reason they have not had sex. They then have sex for the first time, and afterwards, Tamwar discovers Nancy is recording every seizure she has and they are becoming more frequent, and tells her to get help. Nancy becomes interested in Tamwar's religion and reads the Quran. Learning it would be against his beliefs to run a pub, Nancy suggests they set up a different business, and they trial a curry restaurant night at the laundrette. However, Tamwar abandons her and in her stress Nancy has a severe seizure. After, Nancy breaks up with Tamwar, believing his interest in their plan is not strong enough. Mick and Linda worry about Nancy's health, and refuse to give her more shifts at The Queen Vic, so she applies for a job at another pub, The Rat. However, Lee goes behind her back and gets it instead. This causes explosive arguments between them, and feeling she has lost her independence, Nancy quits her job at The Queen Vic and begins working and living with Donna Yates (Lisa Hammond). Mick convinces her to come to Mother's Day lunch to build bridges, but when she finds out Lee has quit his job at The Rat and has essentially taken her job at The Queen Vic, they argue and she pushes Lee, knocking their baby brother Ollie Carter (Charlie Harrington) out of his highchair. Ollie appears to be fine but the argument continues, so Mick physically throws Nancy and Lee out through the public bar. Ollie has a seizure shortly after the fall and is admitted to hospital where the family learns that he may have brain damage. Mick and Linda advise Nancy and Lee to tell them what happened during their argument after the doctors call Social Services. Nancy is crushed when Mick admits he blames her and that he cannot forgive her. She plans an Easter egg hunt to bring the family together, but Mick and Linda do not attend. When Janet Mitchell (Grace) goes missing, Nancy finds her. Her father, Billy Mitchell (Perry Fenwick), thanks her and compliments her to Mick, but Mick still refuses to talk to her. Nancy has sex with Kush, who has also been rejected. She has a seizure in Kush's bed, so Kush calls Tamwar for help. Tamwar is disgusted with Kush, and Nancy asks Tamwar not to tell anyone what happened. Tamwar tells Mick to call Nancy and to stop blaming her for the incident with Ollie. After Johnny (now Ted Reilly) returns to Walford and decides not to return to Italy, Nancy offers to take his ticket, wanting to use the trip to discover who she really is as a person. She asks Tamwar to come with her, and although he initially declines, he later accepts and they decide to travel the world instead. After seeing Nancy saying her goodbyes to Ollie, Mick forgives her and tells her she was not to blame for his accident. Masood decides to accompany Nancy and Tamwar on their journey, but he changes his mind at the last minute, and after emotional goodbyes to their families, Nancy and Tamwar leave Walford.

In March 2017, Mick receives a phonecall from Tamwar revealing that Nancy has been critically injured after being struck by a car while backpacking in Bulgaria. He immediately leaves Walford and flies over to Bulgaria to be with her. In February 2019, the Carters learn that Nancy and Tamwar have got engaged in Australia. They get married there and later settle down in New Zealand.

=== 2021–2022 ===
In April 2021, Nancy returns to Walford to visit Mick and Linda and meets her half-sister Frankie Lewis (Rose Ayling-Ellis). While out of earshot, she calls Tamwar, asking him to move some money into her account. When Linda asks about the secret calls, Nancy reveals that she and Tamwar are getting divorced; mutually realising that they want different things in life. When Frankie sees Nancy going to a doctor's appointment and Linda confronts her upon finding CBD oil in her bag, Nancy reveals that she is taking the oil to control her seizures. She also stuns Linda by revealing that she wants to undergo sterilisation, having decided that she does not want to have children. When Linda continuously interferes with her decision, a frustrated Nancy moves in with Sharon Watts (Letitia Dean) and her half-brother Zack Hudson (James Farrar). While babysitting Sharon's infant son Albie Watts, Nancy has another seizure but manages to calmly put Albie in his crib and call Mick for help before collapsing. When Mick arrives, she breaks down and admits sorrow that her long-time decision to never have children has destroyed her marriage with Tamwar. Mick accompanies Nancy to her next hospital appointment, where she is told that she has to wait a year to undergo sterilisation. Though Nancy is disappointed with the outcome, Mick advises her to wait a year to decide whether she still wants to go through with never having children; he will support her no matter what she decides.

Nancy and Zack get romantically involved and they sleep together. However, Mick requests Zack to give Frankie a driving lesson. While driving, Frankie accidentally hits Nancy who is out on a run. Zack and Frankie rush Nancy to hospital and Zack convinces Frankie to keep quiet about the accident. Mick later finds out the truth, and while he forgives Frankie, he warns Zack to stay away from Nancy. However, Zack refuses to leave Nancy, as he has fallen in love with her. A guilty Zack reveals the truth to Nancy, who is horrified with both Frankie and Zack. She is gutted when Mick supports Frankie and when Frankie passes her driving test, Mick buys her a car, much to Nancy's disappointment. This leads to a feud between Frankie and Nancy, which culminates in Nancy locking Frankie in the boot of her car. However, unbeknownst to Nancy, the car is stolen by Liam Butcher (Alfie Deegan), with Frankie still locked inside. Mick is furious with Nancy, who feels guilty. When Frankie is rescued, she reconciles with Nancy, but chooses to leave the Square for a while so Nancy can have a break from her. Nancy struggles to manage with Linda's alcoholism and is torn between her conflicting parents. She also becomes wary of barmaid Janine Butcher (Charlie Brooks), when she moves in and becomes close to Mick. When she discovers that Janine is scheming to separate her parents and also secretly visited Linda, she attacks her and forces Mick to evict her. Nancy rekindles her friendship with Zack, and also forgives and supports him when he has the opportunity to participate in a cooking competition, letting him use The Queen Vic's kitchen for practice. Their chemistry intensifies due to this; they share a passionate kiss and resume their relationship. Nancy is devastated to learn that her aunt Tina Carter (Luisa Bradshaw-White) – who is thought to have been on the run – has been murdered by Gray Atkins (Toby-Alexander Smith). She and Frankie travel to France to inform Tina's daughter Zsa Zsa Carter (Emer Kenny) of her death. During Tina's funeral, Linda returns and Nancy discovers that she has continued drinking, and sides with Mick. When Linda is shunned by her family, Nancy pities her and moves in with Sharon, whom Linda is staying with, to support her and her half-sister, Annie.

Nancy and Zack decide to open a restaurant together, and they meet with Melissa (Hannah Bennett-Fox), who they believe is an investor. Unbeknownst to the both of them, Melissa is working with Janine to swindle the pair, so she can use the money to pay Linda into leaving Walford. Melissa then fools Nancy and Zack into transferring money into her account. Janine gives half of the money to Linda, who eventually decides to remain in Walford and keeps the money, unaware that it is Nancy's. Nancy becomes suspicious when she does not hear back from the investor, and later discovers that she has been conned. Linda realises that the money Janine gave her belonged to Nancy and vows to tell her the truth during a trip to Watford. Nancy is furious when she finds out that Linda had planned to abandon her family, and leaves Linda stranded after an argument. She is later devastated to discover that Linda has been involved in a car accident with Annie under the influence of alcohol. Nancy and the rest of her family, are unaware that Janine had caused the accident and framed Linda for it. When Linda regains consciousness, she has no recollection of the crash, and wrongly assumes that she must have been driving whilst drunk. All this turmoil causes Nancy to drift apart from Zack and when he sells his car so that they can earn more money, Nancy shows little appreciation. He ends up sleeping with Sam Mitchell (Kim Medcalf) but decides to hide this from Nancy. However, she finds out when a picture is exposed of Zack and Sam together undressed. Nancy responds by ending their relationship, but Zack, determined to win Nancy back, proposes to her; though Nancy turns him down. Nancy decides to reconcile with Linda after disowning her for the accident, but she soon realises that Linda has continued drinking.

Nancy contemplates her life in Walford and realises that she cannot trust her mother and Zack, and doesn't want to be hurt again. Unable to trust Linda, she decides to leave Walford with Annie, but changes her mind when she realises that Linda is willing to become a better mother to Annie. After bidding an emotional farewell to her family, Nancy goes to stay with Johnny in Manchester. The Carters are later devastated to discover Mick’s disappearance at sea on Christmas Day 2022, due to a car accident caused by Janine, and he is subsequently presumed dead. In January 2023, Nancy is contacted off-screen by a sexual health clinic to go for a check-up, after Zack is found to be HIV positive.

=== 2024–2026 ===
In her absence, Linda's alcoholism continues to worsen, brought on by the guilt of murdering Keanu Taylor (Danny Walters) in Sharon’s defence and the threats made against her by his half-sister, Bernadette (Clair Norris). After being banished from The Queen Vic by Nancy's grandmother Elaine Peacock (Harriet Thorpe), Linda experiences an epiphany where she imagines her death and funeral. Within it, Nancy and Lee return to say goodbye, in which Nancy blames Elaine for not doing enough to stop Linda's drinking. After Nancy slaps Elaine outside the church, she and Lee decide to take a now alcoholic Johnny (now Charlie Suff) along with Ollie and Annie away from Walford. The epiphany finally breaks through to Linda and she agrees to seek help for her addiction.

In October 2026, Nancy returns to Walford, heavily pregnant, to see Johnny, but goes to hospital after experiencing Braxton Hicks contractions. Lee later arrives and reveals the baby Nancy and the pair reveal she is acting as a surrogate for Lee and his ex-partner, Jess, who had allegedly walked out on him. When Nancy finds out the true reason for their separation was due to Lee’s growing alcoholism, she begins to have doubts about the pregnancy.

== Reception ==
Hill won "Best Newcomer" at The British Soap Awards 2014 for her portrayal of Nancy. She also won the accolade for "Best Newcomer" at The National Television Awards 2015 for her role as Nancy. Hill, alongside Himesh Patel was shortlisted for Best Partnership at the Inside Soap Awards in 2015 for her portrayal of Nancy's relationship with Tamwar, but lost out to Emmerdale's Charlie Hardwick and Chris Chittell (who play Val and Eric Pollard).

The Guardian's Filipa Jodelka praised the introduction of the Carter family, calling Nancy "the true beacon of hope for EastEnders future". A critic from Huddersfield Daily Examiner said that Dyer and Hill could be the "saviors of EastEnders", stating that Nancy "shoots straight to the top of Characters To Love list when she refuses to serve Dexter in the pub". "A Digital Spy poll (2014) asked respondents to indicate their favourite Carter family member: Nancy was ranked fourth with 8.61% of the results; Mick was ranked first; Johnny, ranked second; Tina, third; and Linda, fifth. Gary Gillatt of Inside Soap praised the pairing of Nancy and Tamwar, saying "At first, Nance and Tam seemed an odd couple even as friends, but truly they are Walford's most sensitive souls." Gillatt also thought their relationship had the potential to last the distance.

Another contributor to Inside Soap branded Nancy "the shining star of the calamitous Carter clan". They went on to say "We reckon she'd been the Carters' secret strength in recent months. And we love naughty Nancy lapping up the other dramas she sees from behind the bar with a cheeky smirk on her face!". In the episode broadcast in the UK on 14 February 2014, Nancy wore part of a Gaelic Athletic Association sports kit from St Patrick's College in Ballymena, and it gained some media attention. Although many fans of the GAA were happy to see this, late campaigner Willie Frazer believed the appearance of the kit belonged to an organisation that "glorifies IRA terrorists", stating he had complained to the BBC. The Ballymena Times claimed that the appearance of the top "caused a real sensation on Facebook and Twitter."

Upon the announcement of Nancy's departure from the series, Stuart Heritage from The Guardian said that Tamwar and Nancy were his favourite EastEnders couple but said their departure storyline "feels as if it's been chucked together blindfolded at the last minute in a panic". Heritage opined that Nancy was "leaving far too soon" as since arriving in 2014, she had "been such a force of nature", adding, "She's been funny and sweet and boisterous and—since the biggest subplot of the soap's entire Christmas period was given to her decision to wear a dress to a wedding—it seemed as if EastEnders had much bigger plans for her."
