= Noeleen Comiskey =

English actress

- Occupation: Actress
- Years active: 2006–present
- Website: www.noeleencomiskey.me

Noeleen Comiskey is an actress who played the recurring character of Marta Shirovs in EastEnders. Other television roles include Sarah Webb in Casualty, Hayley Nichols in Doctors and Nathalia Volkov in Legends, starring Sean Bean. She has also previously appeared in Law & Order: UK and The Bill.

== Career ==
Noeleen Comiskey has appeared in a number of television programmes including Big Train, Law & Order:UK, Casualty, Doctors and Legends. From 2014 to 2015, she played Marta Shirovs in the BBC One soap Eastenders. The character was the wife of Aleks Shirovs (Kristian Kiehling) and originally appeared with their daughter Ineta (Gledisa Osmani) before all three ultimately return to Latvia together.

She has appeared in a number of films including The Search for Simon, Winter Ridge and The Angel of Auschwitz in which she starred as Stanislawa Leczenska.

In 2019, she played the dangerous Ms M in the feature film Criminal Audition, which premiered at FrightFest 2019, and for which she received positive reviews.

She appears in the 2021 film The Obscure Life of the Grand Duke of Corsica, starring Timothy Spall.

== Filmography ==
=== Film ===
Year	Title	Role	Notes
2012	A Bit Older and a Little Bit Taller	Waitress	Short film
2013	Project Kronos	Clare Frishluft	Short film
2013	The Search for Simon	Eloise Eldritch	
2014	I.R.I.S.	Mission Control officer	Short film
2014	Snake Pit	Zoe 'CJ' Hunter	Short film
2015	The Song Plays On	Alice	Short film
2016	Spaceman	Doreen	
2016	The Dependents	The Boss	
2017	Imagineer	Joseph's Mother	Short film
2017	The Beyond	Jessica Johnson	
2018	Winter Ridge	Jane Evans	
2018	The Guard of Auschwitz	Angel	
2019	The Angel of Auschwitz	Stanisława Leszczyńska	
2019	A Secret Journey	Protester 1	Short film
2019	Criminal Audition	Ms M	
2021	The Obscure Life of the Grand Duke of Corsica	Lucy	
2022	Prizefighter: The Life of Jem Belcher	Violet	

=== Television ===
Year	Title	Role	Notes
2001	The Armando Iannucci Shows	Fran	
2002	Big Train	Dr Schtein	
2009	The Bill	Clara Nowak	Episode: "Psychiatric Help"
2010	Law & Order: UK	Amber	Episode: "Anonymous"
2014-2015	Eastenders	Marta Shirovs	7 episodes
2015	Casualty	Sarah Webb	Episode: "Knock Knock Who's There?"
2015	Doctors	Hayley Nichols	Episode: "Milk"
2015	Legends	Nathalia Volkov	Episode: "The Legend of Alexei Volkov"
2017	The Desert	Brenda	6 episodes
2017	Casualty	Karla Warrington	Episode: "Binge Britain"
2023	Doctors	Amy Jenson	Episode: "Tender Sting"
