= Tamwar Masood =

Fictional character in EastEnders

- EastEnders character
- Portrayed by: Himesh Patel
- Duration: 2007–2016
- First appearance: Episode 3444; 1 October 2007
- Last appearance: Episode 5268; 22 April 2016
- Created by: Diederick Santer
- Introduced by: Diederick Santer
- Spin-off appearances: EastEnders: E20 (2010); "All I Want for Christmas" (2012); Tamwar Tales – The Life of an Assistant Market Inspector (2013)
In-universe information
- Occupation: Student; Caterer; Restaurateur; Assistant Market Inspector; Market Inspector
- Father: Masood Ahmed
- Mother: Zainab Masood
- Stepfather: Yusef Khan
- Brothers: Syed Masood; Kamil Masood
- Sisters: Shabnam Masood
- Wife: Afia Khan (2011–2013); Nancy Carter (2019–2021)
- Uncles: Inzamam Ahmed; AJ Ahmed
- Nephews: Zaair Kazemi
- Nieces: Yasmin Masood; Jade Masood
- First cousins: Jamila Inzamam; Ali Inzamam

Tamwar Masood is a fictional character from the BBC soap opera EastEnders, played by Himesh Patel. He made his first appearance on 1 October 2007. On 12 March 2016, it was announced that Patel would be leaving the show, with Tamwar making his final appearance alongside Nancy Carter (Maddy Hill) on 22 April 2016. After more than three years together, he married Nancy off-screen, in Australia, in 2019. They divorced in 2022, after she returned to Albert Square without him.

== Creation and development ==
=== Background ===
Tamwar Masood was one of several Asian characters introduced in 2007 by executive producer Diederick Santer. He was first seen in October 2007. Tamwar was the third character in the Masood family to make an appearance on-screen, joining the already established Zainab, and Shabnam (his mother and sister) who both appeared in July 2007. The core family was completed by the introduction of Tamwar's father, Masood Ahmed, a few weeks later. The Masoods were the first Muslim family to join the show since the Karims, who appeared between 1987 and 1990, and they were the first Asian family to be introduced since the unsuccessful Ferreira family in 2003. Panned by critics and viewers, the Ferreiras were dismissed as unrealistic by the Asian community in the UK, and were eventually axed in 2005.

The introduction of more ethnic minority characters is part of producer Diederick Santer's plan to "diversify", to make EastEnders "feel more 21st century". Prior to 2007, EastEnders was heavily criticised by the Commission for Racial Equality (CRE), for not representing the East End's real "ethnic make-up". It was suggested that the average proportion of visible minority faces on EastEnders was substantially lower than the actual ethnic minority population in East London boroughs, and it therefore reflected the East End in the 1960s, not the East End of the 2000s. Furthermore, it was suggested that an element of "tokenism" and stereotyping surrounded many of the minority characters in EastEnders. The expansion of minority representation in EastEnders provides "more opportunities for audience identification with its characters, hence a wider appeal." Trevor Phillips, CRE chair, has said: "balanced representation of ethnic minority communities in the media matters. The industry has a key part to play in this, it is a powerful tool and can go a long way towards helping to build an integrated society."

=== Casting ===
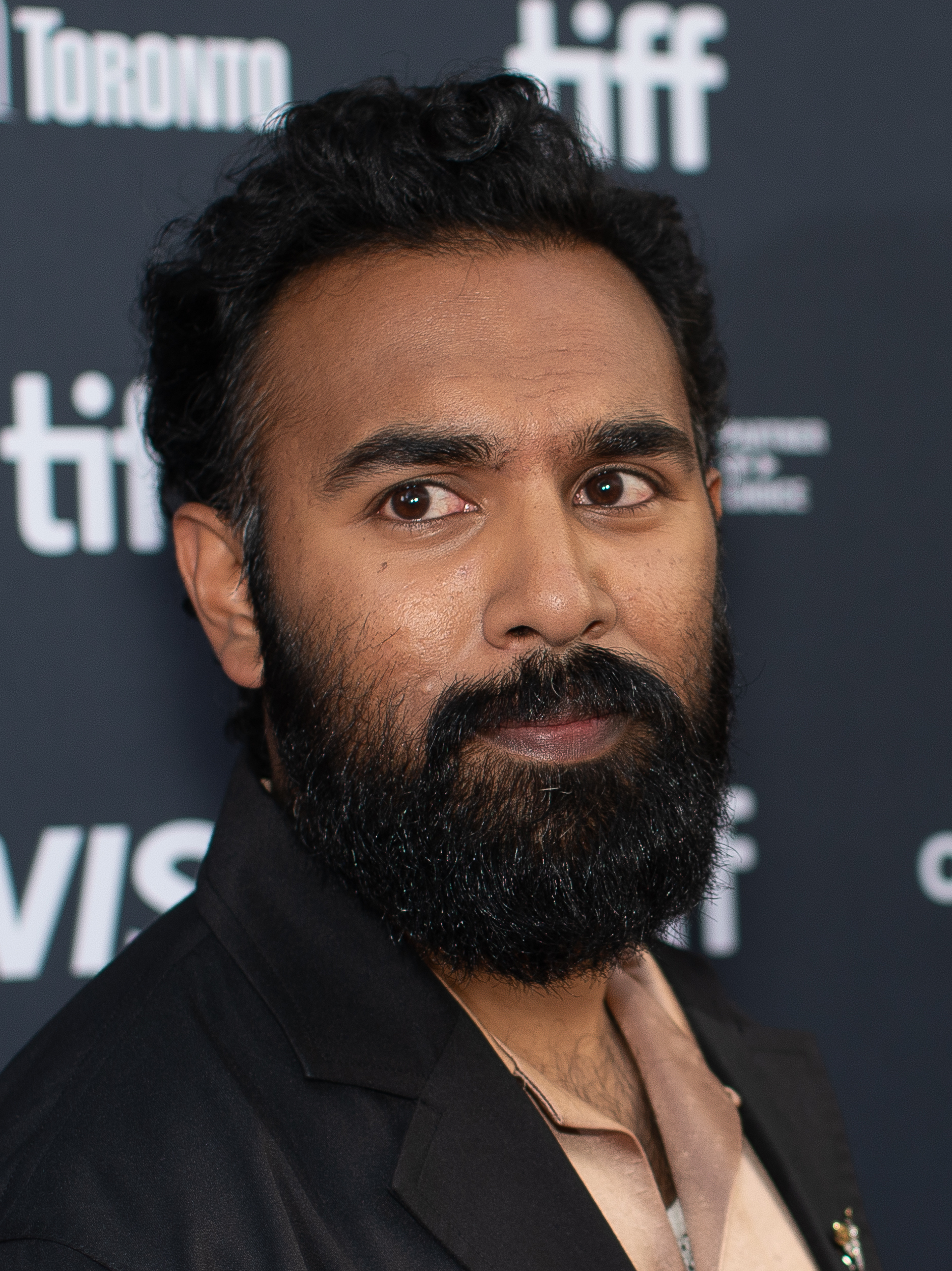
Himesh Patel (pictured) portrayed Tamwar for eight years.

The then-17-year-old actor, Himesh Patel, was cast in the role of Tamwar Masood. Like the character he plays, Patel is the son of a postmistress and he is also a former paperboy. He has commented: "I was so nervous before I went for the audition - my biggest role before was in plays at school but they made us feel very welcome…I was thrilled when I learned that I had got the part…[I] have been avidly watching EastEnders to get up to speed with all the characters … Being in EastEnders is such a great start to my career and working with some amazing actors is fantastic. Sometimes I only get the scripts a couple of days before filming, so it can be a bit stressful learning the lines but I'm managing so far … The whole EastEnders 'family' has been very helpful, and I was made to feel at home from the moment I arrived.

Patel has revealed that he was already a "big fan" of the actors who play his on-screen mother and father, Nina Wadia and Nitin Ganatra: "I was a big fan of Nina and Nitin already, and suddenly to find myself working with such experienced and respected actors was like a dream come true." Steve Biggs, the director of the Cambridge-based "Young Actors Company", where Patel trained, has said "Apart from being an excellent actor, Himesh is a very likeable and down-to-earth young man, who I'm sure will prove to be an absolute hit, both on and off screen". Wadia, who plays Patel's on-screen mother, has added: "I'm looking forward to working with my on-screen son, Himesh Patel."

=== Personality ===
Himesh Patel has described his character: "Tamwar is a quiet boy who could be described as a geek but he is quite single-minded and will do what he wants". Reports in 2007 claimed that Tamwar was to struggle with his sexual identity and be the first homosexual Muslim character featured on a British soap opera. This, however, was denied by the BBC. It has later come apparent that this role has been taken by his older brother, Syed Masood.

=== Storyline development ===
One of the character's storylines involved his secret website where he makes fun of other EastEnders characters. The site, Rude Masood, was shown on screen briefly in October 2009. The actual website subsequently had 186,432 views in a day. Santer commented "It's always fun to find ways to tell our stories and celebrate our characters beyond the show itself. Hopefully, the many people that have found Tamwar's special website will derive big enjoyment from Himesh Patel's extraordinary work. I'm grateful to our very talented webteam – and to Himesh and our writers – for putting this together."

In October 2010, Tamwar grows tired of being single and dates Afia Khan (Meryl Fernandes) but his parents ban them from seeing each other due to history with Afia's father. Patel felt that Tamwar's loneliness was related to his brother Syed's relationship with Christian Clarke (John Partridge), his friend Darren Miller's (Charlie G. Hawkins) relationship with Jodie Gold (Kylie Babbington) and the fact he was left at home with his parents. Tamwar first meets Afia in 2009 but lies that he is attending Oxford University so she dumps him. Patel said Tamwar is grateful for his second chance with Afia, and said there is "a split-second change in Tamwar and his attitude." He added that the storyline is "new territory" for Tamwar, as he has never been part of the family's problems before and feels a sense of guilt for bringing a new problem.

=== Departure ===
On 12 March 2016, it was announced that Tamwar and his girlfriend, Nancy Carter (Maddy Hill) would be leaving the show. Of his departure, Patel said he was "looking forward to new challenges, perhaps on the stage or behind the camera. Whatever awaits me, I'll miss my family at EastEnders immensely - they've watched me grow from boy to man and supported me every step of the way. It's been a true privilege to work alongside them." Both characters made their last appearances on 22 April 2016.

== Storylines ==
Tamwar is a studious fellow who works hard on his studies to please his parents, Zainab Masood (Nina Wadia) and Masood Ahmed (Nitin Ganatra). They are delighted when he achieves five A's during his AS Level exams, with Zainab boasting that Tamwar will be attempting to get a place at either Cambridge or Oxford University. Tamwar uses his intellect to help his parents set up their own business, Masala Masood, a Pakistani take away service. This evolves into a fast food market stall, which Tamwar helps run with his friend Waseem (Richard Charles). Tamwar's secrecy concerns his mother, and she concludes that he is gay, but it transpires that Tamwar is hiding his new hobby as a stand up comic. He shocks his mother by announcing that he wants to pursue comedy as a career, but later retracts and agrees to apply to Oxford. However, he fails to achieve the grades he needs for his place at Oxford, but does not confess this to his family. When his brother Syed Masood's (Marc Elliott) fiancée Amira Shah (Preeya Kalidas) forces Tamwar to do so, he confesses to his family that he cannot go to university. He then sets up his own website, Rude Masood, where he impersonates Walford's residents Dot Branning (June Brown), Peggy Mitchell (Barabra Windsor), Pat Evans (Pam St Clement) and Patrick Trueman (Rudolph Walker).

At Syed and Amira's wedding, Tamwar meets up with Afia Khan (Meryl Fernandes). He tells her he has never kissed a girl, so she kisses him. A few days later, they go out to lunch, and Tamwar ends their brief romance. When he receives his A level resit results, they are worse than the first time he took them, so he decides to give up trying to go to university. When Syed and Christian Clarke (John Partridge) begin a gay relationship, Tamwar is angry with his mother for acting like Syed is dead, and is generally supportive of Syed. Tamwar starts to grow tired of being single, especially as his best friend Darren Miller (Charlie G. Hawkins) is in a relationship with Jodie Gold (Kylie Babbington). He starts seeing Afia again and meets her father Yusef Khan (Ace Bhatti) who approves of him. Yusef arranges to meet Zainab and Masood, but he is revealed to be Zainab's ex-husband whose family set her on fire for infidelity. Tamwar tells Afia they cannot see each other again. The next day Afia visits Tamwar and tries to persuade him to reconsider. Tamwar refuses, saying he has to respect the will of his parents. Zainab and Masood buy the local Indian restaurant, the Argee Bhajee, saying it is for Tamwar to run, but he does not want it. Syed arranges for Afia to see Tamwar, and they spend time alone in the restaurant. Masood discovers this and again bans Tamwar from seeing her. However, they continue to see each other, and Masood and Zainab allow it, hoping it will fizzle out, until Afia continues to mention her father, so Masood asks her to break up with Tamwar. She blames her father so Tamwar asks Masood to speak to him. When Yusef discovers they are still seeing each other, he assumes they are to marry and gives his blessing, much to Masood and Zainab's despair. They arrange the mangni (engagement party) and Yusef and Afia decide it should be a big party.

When Masood accuses Afia of lying that she has never been with anyone before Tamwar, Afia fears it will ruin their relationship. Although Masood realises he has made a mistake, Tamwar and Afia marry in secret on the day before their mangni. At the mangni, Tamwar is about to tell his family that they are already married when they are interrupted by Syed's entrance and the roof collapsing. They then decide against telling anyone as Tamwar's parents are facing financial difficulties. However, when the new couple learn that Masood kidnapped Yusef and threatened him, this leads to Masood being banned from the couple's mehndi, causing a strain between Tamwar and his father. However, at the mehndi, Tamwar and Afia admit their secret marriage to the family (including Masood who turns up uninvited), and the couple begin living with each other at the Masood family home.

Afia reveals to Tamwar that it was Yusef that set Zainab on fire and not his family, and Tamwar loses trust in Afia. Tamwar walks off and Afia goes to find him. Tamwar returns and hears that Afia is in the bed and breakfast where a fire has broken out, so he enters to save her, but she is not inside. Afia returns and Yusef is killed, while Tamwar exits with full-thickness burns to his back and in need of a skin graft. While Tamwar recovers in hospital, he refuses to see Afia, whom he blames for lying to him and he continues to ignore her when he arrives home, but she reminds him that she is still his wife. Masood then reveals that Yusef hit Zainab, and Tamwar says he wishes he had never met Afia. Eventually he starts to talk to her, but does not allow her to see his body, changing in the bathroom. He shows her his scars after being convinced to do so by a friend, and she is shocked. When Tamwar and Afia discover that Zainab has inherited all of Yusef's money and that she wants him and Afia to take it, Tamwar repeatedly declines the offer, saying that he wants nothing to do with his money and that they should get rid of it. Tamwar then decides to leave Walford after discovering that Afia planned to spend the money on surgery for him. However, he is later convinced to stay by Zainab and his friend Fatboy (Ricky Norwood). Tamwar tells Afia that if she does not like him as he is, she should leave him. The pair reconcile, but their marriage is put under strain by the long hours at the restaurant, and Zainab's interference in their affairs. Afia eventually leaves him as she finds that her and Tamwar want different things and that remaining in Walford will make her unhappy. As she rides off on her moped, Tamwar asks her not to forget him.

Tamwar struggles to run the restaurant and Syed takes over but he steals money from it and does not pay the mortgage, leading to it being repossessed, and it is revealed that Zainab lent Syed money from Tamwar's college fund. Tamwar accuses Zainab of favouring Syed, and Masood tells her to leave for keeping secrets. She does so, and Tamwar decides to go back to college, but then decides to take over Zainab's job in the local shop to help with the family's finances. Zainab soon returns, and she and Masood set a date for their wedding, but Tamwar is upset when they break up for good and Zainab returns to Pakistan, taking Tamwar's young brother Kamil (Arian Chikhlia). Tamwar wants to go to University but in order to earn money he takes a job as the assistant market inspector. He starts dating Alice Branning (Jasmyn Banks), and they have sex. Michael Moon (Steve John Shepherd) interferes in the relationship however, and they soon break up.

Tamwar's sister Shabnam (Rakhee Thakrar) returns to Walford and Masood learns that his mother has died, causing him to start drinking heavily. When Masood is found in an alleyway after being mugged, Tamwar is left to look after him. Tamwar's new boss, Aleks Shirovs (Kristian Kiehling), arrives at his house and accuses him of stealing money from the workplace, when it was actually Masood. Tamwar discovers this after Aleks leaves, and shouts and insults Masood, who retaliates by punching Tamwar in the mouth. The next day, Tamwar tries to throw Masood out of the house, but he throws a drink over him and refuses to move out. Fatboy then calls Shabnam and reveals that Masood punched Tamwar, so she returns to Albert Square permanently. Months later, Tamwar grows close to Nancy Carter (Maddy Hill) when a fire at the Slater household reminds him of the fire in which he was badly burned. After Aleks is fired and leaves Walford, Tamwar is promoted to Market Inspector to replace Aleks. Tamwar worries Nancy will be put off by his scars but she is not. Their relationship blossoms and she takes an interest in his religion. In 2016, they plan to start a business together and Nancy quits her job but Tamwar refuses to leave his job on the market. They open a pop-up restaurant in the launderette, but Tamwar leaves her there when there is a family problem and she suffers an absence seizure, so her parents, Mick Carter (Danny Dyer) and Linda Carter (Kellie Bright) stop him seeing her. Their relationship ends.

A few months later, his former brother-in-law, Kush Kazemi (Davood Ghadami) calls Tamwar after Nancy suffers a seizure in his bed. Tamwar realises that Nancy is deeply unhappy with her life at home and tells Linda this. They soon reunite but Nancy is still unhappy and plans to leave for Italy, asking Tamwar to go with her. He agrees, saying that he will not let her walk out of his life like he did with Afia. When Masood gives him some money, they plan to travel the world. Masood initially plans to join them. However, this does not happen and after saying an emotional farewell to their respective families, Tamwar and Nancy depart Walford.

In February 2019, Tamwar calls Mick, telling him that he and Nancy are engaged. They later marry in Australia and they later settle in New Zealand; however, by 2021 Nancy returns to Walford alone and the couple divorce. She reveals that their marriage broke down because Tamwar wanted children, while she did not.

== Other appearances ==
On 26 June 2013, it was announced that Tamwar would feature in his own four-episode Internet spin-off series called Tamwar Tales – The Life of an Assistant Market Inspector. The series was available on the official EastEnders website starting on 25 July 2013, with weekly episodes. The series was written by Richard Lazarus, and also features Ricky Norwood (Fatboy), Tameka Empson (Kim Fox), Nitin Ganatra (Masood Ahmed) and Jean Slater (Gillian Wright). Patel said of the series, "It was really fun working on the four shorts. It was like taking a character that we know and putting him in a different genre. Viewers who are fans of Tamwar will finally get a look inside his head."

No.	Title	Length	Original release date
1	"Kim"	2m 55s	25 July 2013
Tamwar investigates a laundry bag left in the market. Featuring Kim Fox.
2	"Masood"	2m 37s	1 August 2013
Tamwar attempts to stop his father, Masood Ahmed, from fly-pitching.
3	"Fatboy"	3m 11s	8 August 2013
Tamwar tries to get Fatboy to turn his music down but they end up doing the Harlem Shake.
4	"Jean"	2m 53s	15 August 2013
Tamwar conducts a survey to find out what the stallholders think of him. Features Jean Slater.
—	"Behind the scenes"	2m 31s	22 August 2013
Behind the scenes of filming and outtakes.

Tamwar makes cameo appearances in the Internet spin-off series EastEnders: E20. In episode 8 of series 1, Mercy Olubunmi (Bunmi Mojekwu) asks him for help with a website project. Later, her friend Fatboy sees them talking and accuses Tamwar of having sex with Mercy and getting her pregnant. In episode 3 of series 2, Tamwar delivers a curry to Stevie Dickinson (Amanda Fairbank-Hynes) but finds her waiting in bed as she was expecting Masood who she had an erotic dream about. Tamwar is embarrassed and takes the curry back when she is unable to pay. In episode 5, Naz Mehmet (Emaa Hussen) flirts with Tamwar to get free food, and though he is reluctant, he agrees when she says one day he can touch her breasts.

Tamwar also appears in the online episode "All I Want for Christmas", in 2012.

== Reception ==
In 2008, it was reported that Cambridge University wanted to shed its "elitist" image and approached the producers of Britain's three leading soaps, EastEnders, Coronation Street and Emmerdale, to include it in their storylines. Spokesman Greg Hayman said the idea was part of a bid to correct the perception that Cambridge was "not for young people from ordinary backgrounds. We're very keen to attract the brightest and best students regardless of their background," Hayman said. "One of the better ways of communicating directly with potential students is to talk to them through the soaps and other programs they watch." This move followed government pressure for the university to become more inclusive and to target all economic backgrounds. 90% of British students attend state high schools, Oxford and a Cambridge draw only about half their student body from there. It was reported that working-class individuals view attending Oxford or Cambridge as an impossible dream, which university officials claim is unfair and they are hoping to dispel this by featuring the Universities in working-class soaps such as EastEnders. Hayman said there have been no firm commitments from TV producers, although one crew was planning an exploratory visit to Cambridge; however he expressed that he was happy with the plot running in EastEnders that showed "working-class teenagers Tamwar Masood and Libby Fox considering applying to Cambridge and Oxford, to the delight of their ambitious mothers", saying that "It's a very happy coincidence." Oxford University said it had no plans to write to the soaps for inclusion but a spokesperson claims, "I did speak to somebody at EastEnders about our bursary scheme in case the story line was going to continue. We wanted to make sure they knew what kind of assistance might be available to someone like Libby." EastEnders refused to comment on whether the universities would be featured at the time, as Tamwar and Libby still had another year left at college "and it was too early to say whether the Oxford-Cambridge plot would continue."

Reporting on the University storyline, The Guardian noted that Libby and Tamwar applying to the universities "could be their dream storyline: clever state school kids can get a place. But it could also be their worst nightmare. Young Libby is already revealing concerns that she might not be able to afford to go to the university." The paper alleges that both universities' press offices "fired off letters to the script editors: did they know about the generous bursaries and seemingly bottomless pit of cash available to help students from low-income homes stay on their courses? Could that be mentioned?".

Tamwar, along with the rest of the Masood family, was criticised by actor Deepak Verma, who played Sanjay Kapoor between 1993 and 1998. He said that EastEnders had failed to portray Asian families in a realistic manner, branding the family "two-dimensional and ill-conceived". A BBC spokesperson responded by saying ""It's a shame Deepak feels that way but that's clearly his personal opinion. The Masood family have proved to be hugely popular with EastEnders viewers." In 2009, Ruth Deller of entertainment website lowculture.co.uk praised Tamwar, stating: "Tamwar has really come into his own lately, and everyone is rooting for him to get with Amira – he appeals to the inner geek in all of us, except he's probably better at one-liners." A writer for website Watch With Mothers also praised Tamwar in the light of the reveal of his brother Syed's affair with gay character Christian Clarke, saying this his line "so long as we've got each other" was so mature that it "elevated his character above the entire plot-strand, everyone around him and, almost, the entire show. [...] Tamwar's was the only script containing any genuine sensitivity or common sense."

Upon the announcement of Tamwar's departure from the series, Stuart Heritage from The Guardian said that Tamwar and Nancy were his favourite EastEnders couple but said their departure storyline "feels as if it's been chucked together blindfolded at the last minute in a panic". Heritage opined that Tamwar's departure would be a "great loss" and said, "he's always been a character out of step with the rest of the show", adding "the overwhelming memory of Tamwar will be him simply existing; walking around Albert Square in an anorak, not really doing anything, underplaying every line in a way that suggests he's an overlay from a parallel, less histrionic version of EastEnders. [...] He did his best work on the sidelines, an alien observer of the most befuddlingly toxic neighbourhood in the country." Hannah Verdier from The Guardian called Tamwar a "strangely lovable charisma vacuum". In 2020, Sara Wallis and Ian Hyland from The Daily Mirror placed Tamwar 31st on their ranked list of the Best EastEnders characters of all time, calling him a "Nerdy assistant market inspector and wouldbe stand-up comedian" who was "a much funnier character than he was ever given credit for".

== See also ==
- List of EastEnders: E20 characters
- List of EastEnders television spin-offs
