= Charlie Cotton (2014 character) =

Fictional character from the BBC soap opera EastEnders

- EastEnders character
- Portrayed by: Declan Bennett
- Duration: 2014–2015, 2017
- First appearance: Episode 4817; 10 March 2014
- Last appearance: Episode 5616; 15 December 2017
- Created by: Dominic Treadwell-Collins
- Introduced by: Dominic Treadwell-Collins (2014); Sean O'Connor (2017); John Yorke (2017)
In-universe information
- Occupation: Caretaker; Car salesman; Car dealership manager; Hotel manager
- Father: Nick Cotton
- Mother: Yvonne Cotton
- Half-brothers: Ashley Cotton
- Half-sisters: Dotty Cotton
- Wife: Ronnie Mitchell (2015–2016); Liz Cotton (2016–present)
- Sons: Matthew Mitchell Cotton
- Grandfathers: Charlie Cotton
- Grandmothers: Dot Cotton
- Uncles: Andrew Cotton; Tom "Rocky" Cotton

Charlie Cotton is a fictional character from the BBC soap opera EastEnders, played by Declan Bennett. He first appeared on 10 March 2014. He was introduced as the grandson of established character Dot Branning (June Brown) and the son of original character Nick Cotton (John Altman). The character and casting was announced on 22 January 2014. Charlie arrived to inform Dot, who was unaware of his existence, that Nick had died, but it later transpired that this was not the truth as Nick returned in October. His storylines have included: his desperation to keep Nick's fake death secret; his relationships with Dot and mother Yvonne Cotton (Pauline McLynn); a one-night stand with Ronnie Mitchell (Samantha Womack) which resulted in her pregnancy and their marriage; the car accident that resulted in the birth of his son, Matthew Mitchell Cotton and Ronnie being left in a coma; his affair with Ronnie's sister, Roxy Mitchell (Rita Simons); the breakdown of his marriage; and his subsequent departure.

It was announced on 23 July 2015 that Bennett had been axed by show bosses. Charlie's departure episode was broadcast on 24 September 2015, where viewers were left wondering if Charlie had been killed by Ronnie and Vincent Hubbard (Richard Blackwood), though he is later revealed to be alive. On 5 April 2017, it was revealed that Bennett would be reprising the role, with Charlie returning on 5 May. He departed again on 9 June, although his voice is heard via a phone call on 12 June. Bennett made another return for two episodes from 14 to 15 December.

== Creation and development ==
=== Casting and introduction ===
The character of Charlie Cotton and Declan Bennett's casting were revealed on 22 January 2014. He was introduced to develop new storylines for long-standing character Dot Branning (June Brown), who had had a quiet few years on the show. On his casting, Bennett said that he was 'delighted' to be joining EastEnders and looked forward to working with Brown. The ambiguity over Charlie's intentions were also made clear, as executive producer Dominic Treadwell-Collins hinted that he may follow in the footsteps of his dodgy father and grandfather, who he was named after.

Bennett made his first appearance as Charlie on 10 March 2014, but was credited only as 'police officer' until his full introduction in the following episode in which he revealed his identity to Dot.

=== Nick Cotton's fake death ===
Charlie's introduction sees him lying to Dot that her son Nick Cotton (John Altman) is dead. Despite Charlie's lies to Dot and the other residents of Walford, Bennett said in an interview with All About Soap in August 2014 that Charlie is still a "good man", and has "Dot's best interests at heart". He said that Charlie's relationship with Dot is "beginning to blossom", and that "everyone's assumption was that because he was the spawn of Nick Cotton he would be bad."

=== Ronnie and Roxy Mitchell ===
On the storyline in which Ronnie Mitchell (Samantha Womack) reveals she is pregnant by Charlie, Bennett said that he thought Charlie should "tread carefully" around Ronnie due to her violent history, and said that the baby was a complete shock to Charlie as he thought Ronnie was "never to be seen again".

Many comparisons have been made from the Charlie/Ronnie romance to the Ronnie/Jack relationship before it. Like that romance, a hurdle for their relationship is Ronnie's sister Roxy Mitchell (Rita Simons).

=== Departure ===
On 23 July 2015, it was announced that Bennett had been written out by show bosses after eighteen months playing the character. Bennett had been spotted with co-star, Rita Simons (who plays Roxy) filming his final scenes at a local train station. The pictures show Roxy joining Charlie and Matthew as they prepare to leave Walford. A show spokesperson commented, "We can confirm that Declan Bennett will be leaving EastEnders. We wish him all the best for the future." Bennett tweeted a goodbye to the show following the announcement, "Sayonara Eastenders. It's been a right ride. Much love to all of u for the well wishes. See you on the flip side" In the build-up to his exit, Ronnie ended her marriage to Charlie and asked him to leave their home, which he took as a surprise. Charlie had asked Roxy to leave Walford with him and Matthew, but Roxy secretly informed her sister of his intentions and they teamed up against Charlie. Charlie realised Roxy's agenda when she tried to stall him from leaving, which led to Roxy and Ronnie desperately trying to stop Charlie from leaving. A train arrived hiding Charlie and Matthew, leaving the sisters to think he had taken Matthew. However, when Ronnie heard Matthew crying, it was shown Charlie had left Matthew and jumped onto the train. Bennett tweeted his thanks to his fans for making his time on the show "a sweet ride". He extended his thanks to Matthew, Womack and Simons for making "baby making and adultery such a pleasurable experience", as well as reminding readers to not "Mess With a Mitchell".

Viewers were left to wonder whether Charlie had been killed by Ronnie and Vincent or if he was threatened into leaving. Following the airing of his final scenes, Bennett tweeted a picture of himself looking inquisitive, with a caption of "Vin-Scent". Two months later, on 20 November, it was revealed that Charlie had left the country and was too scared of Ronnie to return. Charlie was not seen on screen, but Roxy did speak to him and he reassured her that he was safe.

=== Return ===
Bennett was asked back to the show at the end of 2016. Subsequently, it was reported on 5 April 2017 that Bennett would be returning, nineteen months after his exit. Bennett was seen filming with Jake Wood, who plays Max Branning. After his return aired on 5 May 2017, Bennett revealed: "I got wind of the storyline of Ronnie and Roxy coming to an end and I was quite intrigued so I started watching again to see how it played out and then I got this phone call out of the blue asking: 'Do you want to come back? You've got a biological son here who we think might need his dad!' I'd got back into the show from watching Ronnie and Roxy's exits and I really liked what Sean O'Connor was doing—I was really engaged and I like his style and the long, drawn out nature. It was a bit of a no brainer—it's always nice for an actor to go back and revisit a character and it's only in the soap world that could ever happen; it's quite a unique experience as you wouldn't go back to a stage show and do part two!" Bennett left the show a month later in June. However, he made an unannounced return again in December.

== Storylines ==
=== 2014–2015 ===
Charlie accompanies a policewoman who informs Dot Branning (June Brown) of the death of her son, Nick Cotton (John Altman). He returns later and explains that he is Nick's son. Charlie indicates that he is a police detective by saying that a friend down at the station mentioned a dead Cotton. Dot struggles to accept Charlie, while he helps with the arrangements for Nick's funeral. Dot insists that the coffin will be in the house on the day before the funeral. When Dot's friends visit to pay their respects to Nick, Charlie gets into an argument with Ian Beale (Adam Woodyatt) and the coffin falls open and an arm falls out. Charlie is quick to react, and tells the funeral director Les Coker (Roger Sloman) to nail the coffin closed so nothing like it happens again. After Nick's funeral, Charlie takes Dot to the crematorium to see Nick's body before cremation, but they are too late, leaving Dot devastated. Charlie later has sex with Ronnie Mitchell (Samantha Womack) after she accidentally runs over Lola Pearce (Danielle Harold) in her car.

Charlie and Dot continue to grow close and she introduces him to her husband Jim (John Bardon) off-screen. Les begins to blackmail Charlie by threatening to reveal secrets about Nick's death and funeral. Dot calls at the police station, to be told that nobody called "Charlie Cotton" works there and questions whether he is her grandson. She refuses to listen to Charlie's excuses, instead opting to contact his mother Yvonne Cotton (Pauline McLynn) for answers. Yvonne backs up Charlie's story that his case requires him to use a false name, but after the meeting Charlie warns Yvonne to make sure that she keeps their secret. Charlie continues to bond with Dot.

Carol Jackson (Lindsey Coulson) asks Charlie to speak to her grandson, Liam Butcher (James Forde), as the police are asking questions about drug dealing. Charlie leaves his phone in the house, which Carol answers and discovers that Nick is alive. She confronts Charlie, who says Dot is better off without Nick and now he cannot return to her life. Carol tells Charlie to tell Dot the truth or she will, but eventually decides not to as Dot enjoys having Charlie around. However, Dot's stepson Max Branning (Jake Wood) is still suspicious of Charlie, and talks to DC Emma Summerhayes (Anna Acton), who cannot prove that Charlie is a police officer. However, when Charlie reveals to Emma that he knows about her affair with Max, he tells her to back off or he will expose her. Charlie shows up at a care home where he is greeted by Yvonne. She tells him that he is late for work and it is revealed that he is in fact a caretaker. Charlie's car window is smashed, and he receives a text message from Nick, confirming he did it. When Yvonne finds out, she insists they flee him to Ireland, and she forces him to say goodbye to Dot. He is unable to do so, and returns to Dot. With Yvonne gone, he moves in with her. He shows his angry side once again when he believes that Carol has told Dot about Nick still being alive, and, as a result, Carol's distrust grows and she orders him to do a DNA test to prove he is Dot's grandson. They intend to take DNA from Dot's toothbrush, she catches them but participates, and the tests reveal that Charlie is who he says he is.

Charlie is shocked when Ronnie returns and tells him that she is pregnant with his child. Dot encourages him to support her and persuades him to propose to her. As he tries to, Ronnie confesses that she killed a man. He tells her, and later tells Dot, that the policewoman was a carer in the home where he was the caretaker and that he had never been in the police. Ronnie accepts his proposal. Nick reveals himself to Dot, leaving her distraught. Yvonne moves in and they hide Nick.

Ronnie tries to bribe Nick to leave but he takes the money and stays. Charlie and Ronnie marry on New Year's Day 2015, but Ronnie goes into labour at the reception. Ronnie's sister Roxy (Rita Simons) drives her and Charlie to the hospital, but she crashes the car, running over and killing Emma. Charlie suffers a dislocated shoulder and Ronnie dies momentarily, is resuscitated and put into a medically induced coma. Their son is delivered via emergency caesarean and is named Matthew. Charlie struggles with fatherhood and asks Roxy to look after the baby. Charlie soon discovers from Yvonne that Nick caused the car crash because he cut the brakes of the car. Matthew goes missing which makes Charlie realise that he loves his son. When Charlie finds him, he takes Matthew home to Dot's house. He tells the Mitchells the truth about himself and vows to go to the police, but Roxy and Sharon Mitchell (Letitia Dean) convince him not to. When he and Roxy learn that Ronnie may have extreme brain damage when she fails to awake from her coma, they both bond due to their grief and end up kissing and having sex. After Ronnie is woken from her coma, Charlie learns that Dot has killed Nick. When she hands herself in to the police, Charlie gives a statement trying to help her be released, but is arrested himself and charged with assisting an offender, he is later given a suspended prison sentence. Charlie admits to Roxy that he loves her, but, after seeing Ronnie with Matthew, decides that he cannot leave her and asks Roxy to leave Walford.

Eventually, Ronnie and Charlie separate when she grows bored of him and has sex with Vincent Hubbard (Richard Blackwood). Charlie tells Roxy he married the wrong sister and they plan to flee to France with Matthew. Roxy tells Ronnie this, so they come up with their own plan where Roxy goes along with Charlie. Charlie discovers Roxy and Ronnie's secret plan, and attempts to leave with just Matthew, but Ronnie convinces him to leave Matthew behind. The next day, Dot, distraught at Charlie's sudden departure, contacts him and tells him to come back to Walford and fight for custody. Charlie arrives in Walford but is confronted by Ronnie about the custody of their child. Charlie then decides to threaten to reveal how she murdered Carl White (Daniel Coonan), which scares Ronnie. She then asks Vincent to do her a favour and they both confront him at Dot's house. Vincent is then spotted by his mother, who realises that he has a change of clothes and there is no sign of Charlie. Ronnie later tells Roxy that Charlie has "gone", and Masood Ahmed (Nitin Ganatra) finds Charlie's wallet in a bin and hands it to Roxy. Ronnie tells everyone that Charlie went to care for Yvonne after a bad accident, but although Dot believes her, Roxy is sceptical of her story. Two months later, Roxy confronts Ronnie about Charlie, and Ronnie calls Vincent to get Charlie to call Roxy. Charlie reveals to Roxy during the call that he fled the country and is too scared to return to Walford because of Ronnie.

=== 2017 ===
In January 2017, Ronnie and Roxy die on the night of Ronnie and Jack Branning's (Scott Maslen) wedding. Ronnie and Roxy's mother, Glenda Mitchell (Glynis Barber), convinces Dot not to inform Charlie but Dot still expects him to attend their funerals and take custody of Matthew. However, Charlie does not attend. Four months later, Max decides to call Charlie, claiming that he believes Jack is struggling to cope with three children, including one that is not his. When Matthew goes missing, Max tells him he is at Dot's house and when Jack goes there, Charlie answers the door, saying he wants to talk about his son. A few days later, Charlie tells Dot that he has married a woman called Liz (Michelle Connolly) and they live in Ireland. Max convinces Jack to allow Charlie to spend time with Matthew, who reluctantly agrees. He later agrees that Charlie has helped but doesn't trust him. Later, Max tells Charlie he has a proposition for him. Charlie tells Dot that he has spoken to a solicitor about getting custody of Matthew, but Dot thinks he is being selfish as Matthew knows Jack. After Jack invites Dot on a family holiday, she tells him that Charlie wants custody so Jack confronts Charlie saying that he promised never to leave his children, including Matthew, while Max watches. Jack and Charlie argue and Jack punches Charlie when he says Ronnie deserved to die. Jack's solicitor tells Jack that the fight should not affect the case as Charlie goaded him, so Max visits Charlie and assaults him to make it seem that Jack's attack was worse than it was. Jack is arrested and charged with assault. Dot attempts to get Jack and Charlie to make amends for Matthew, but Charlie insists that he will take Matthew to Ireland, despite Dot asking him to stay. Later, Charlie watches Honey Mitchell (Emma Barton) in the park with the children and talks to Matthew. Honey tells him that Jack is a good father who gives the children security, love and comfort and that Charlie's return is harming the children, so Charlie tells Jack that he is withdrawing his application for residency. However, Jack still fears he will lose Matthew and hires someone to make Charlie "disappear", but Max persuades him to cancel it. Liz later comes to Walford and meets Jack, explaining that Matthew would have a good life with her and Charlie. After talking to Mick Carter (Danny Dyer), Jack decides to let Charlie take Matthew. Charlie promises to keep in touch but Max gives him money to fund IVF on the condition that Charlie stays away from Walford and never contacts Jack again, threatening him with more violence if he backs out. After handing his phone to Max and telling him that he is dead inside, Charlie leaves while Max smashes the phone. The next day, Charlie leaves a voicemail on Jack's phone, explaining that he cannot contact him while Matthew settles in, and apologising for the circumstances.

Matthew and Charlie return in December 2017 and Charlie explains to Jack the reason for their return is that Matthew refers to Jack as "dad". Charlie also tells Jack that he just wanted contact and that having Matthew full-time was not "part of the plan", so Jack demands to know what the plan was. Charlie tells Jack that Max set him up and that the company Max works for rented a flat for him. After initially denying it, Max admits that he was responsible for Matthew being taken away as payback and Jack throws Max out. Before leaving for Ireland with Matthew, Charlie sees Max's daughters, Lauren (Jacqueline Jossa) and Abi Branning (Lorna Fitzgerald), who ask him to come back and visit them again soon. In 2019, Dot reveals that Charlie and Liz are expecting another child. In January 2020, Dot leaves Walford and stays with Charlie, Liz and their children in Ireland.

In December 2022, Charlie phones Dot's relative Sonia Fowler (Natalie Cassidy) off-screen, informing her that Dot has died. Charlie's half-sister Dotty (Milly Zero), reveals that he has contracted COVID-19 and is unable to attend the funeral. However, alongside Dotty, he inherits £10,000 whilst his son Matthew inherits £1,000.

== Reception ==
Charlie's initial appearances were criticised by Kate White from Inside Soap. She said "What's Charlie Cotton all about? He floats in and out of Walford like some kind of benign haunting. We sometimes forget about him even when's on screen in front of us. This plot needs shocking back to life!" Amy Duncan from the Metro thought Charlie "must be dodgy" and wondered "if he was as good as he seemed". Duncan also suspected Charlie would be "Walford's new bad boy" with Nick as his father. Charlie and Ronnie's romance was also praised by Ryan Love from Digital Spy, who said that he was "instantly sold on the pairing" and that the Ronnie/Charlie dynamic was much better than the Ronnie/Jack relationship before it. However, the affair between Roxy and Charlie was not well received, with Love criticising its similar feel to the Ronnie/Jack/Roxy love triangle, and angry how it resulted in the exit of popular character Aleks Shirovs (Kristian Kiehling).
