= Criminal Audition =

2019 British thriller horror film

- Film poster
- Directed by: Samuel Gridley
- Written by: Luke Kaile; Samuel Gridley
- Produced by: Nathaniel Francis; Samuel Gridley; Luke Kaile; Luke Mordue
- Starring: Luke Kaile; Rich Keeble; Rebecca Calienda; Noeleen Comiskey
- Cinematography: Richard Osborne
- Edited by: Mike Pike
- Music by: Al Anderson; Asa Bennett
- Production companies: Blood & Tweed; Mordue Pictures; Muzzle the Pig
- Distributed by: Miracle Media
- Release date: 24 August 2019 (London FrightFest)
- Running time: 92 minutes
- Country: United Kingdom
- Language: English

Criminal Audition is a 2019 British thriller horror film written by Luke Kaile and Samuel Gridley, and directed by Gridley in his feature film debut. The film stars Kaile, Rich Keeble, Rebecca Calienda and Noeleen Comiskey.

The film had its world premiere at the London FrightFest Film Festival on 24 August 2019.

== Synopsis ==
An ex-lawyer, William (Rich Keeble), and his team consisting of Ryan (Luke Kaile), Moe (Scott Samain) and Adeline (Angela Peters), run an underworld service providing fake criminals to take on other people's crimes. But a new dangerous client, Ms M (Noeleen Comiskey) turns their world upside down as they face lies, deceit and murder over the course of one night.

== Plot ==
An underground organization which helps free paying criminals helps out yet another client; Miss M. William, Adeline, Moe, and Ryan are founders of this organization, Ryan being an expert as he was used in a trial before joining. At the beginning of the film, we see that members of this underground organization have put together a total of 3 potential candidates (supposed to be 4 but one is missing) for the murder case they are covering. Each candidate is blinded by sacks and bound in handcuffs linked to one another in a chain. They are to undergo a series of tests to figure out which of the 3 fits the profile and will be convicted for this case.

The client in question, Miss M, appears with her assistant Morris to shake things up and to make sure that her money is being well spent to cover her tracks. After interfering with several of the procedures the organization has, Miss M, ends up killing P after he refused to bash someone’s head in like she asked. Ryan who is becoming fed up with the interference and brutality of the client tries to free another candidate. Morris sees this and promptly drugs and strangles the candidate before they have a chance to fight back.

It’s down to two candidates now, L and J. Miss M test them on how to hide the body and despite the impressive answer J gave, L is declared the winner based on Ryan’s reaction. Miss M changes the game after this “victory” for L. She decides to choose Ryan as a candidate based on a deal William had made prior to a threat she made against him. Ryan— who wants out of this deal, is baffled and tries to convince the duo otherwise but is knocked out.

The true motive behind Miss M and Morris’ involvement is based on the case Ryan had confessed to before joining the team. The victim of the said case had been her sister and a dear friend of Morris, they were unhappy to find out that justice had actually not been served and are looking for revenge. Their plan to torture and kill all members of the team had been short-lived as Ryan was able to slit the throat of Morris before he was able to torture him. L and Ryan find and shoot Miss M after she doused William and Adeline in gas. William tries to persuade Ryan to free him and to take the money, but Ryan and L leave the pair tied up. The film ends with L and Ryan escaping with the money, an unspoken bond between the two now.

== Cast ==
- Luke Kaile as Ryan
- Rich Keeble as William
- Rebecca Calienda as L
- Noeleen Comiskey as Ms M
- Cameron Harris as Morris
- Scott Samain as Moe
- Blain Neale as J
- Ben Scheck as P
- Jonathan Burteaux as Benoit
- Angela Peters as Adeline

== Production ==
=== Development ===
The film originally started as a play written by Kaile in 2009 after he finished college. He entered film writing competitions for practice and continued to write. Criminal Audition was the script that was to be adapted to the stage and once Kaile saw the potential in it, he decided to expand it into a film. He spoke with members of the audience and saw their enthusiasm, realizing that this story is one that could be rooted in the real world as well. That was enough for Kaile and soon brought the play to Gridley to develop it into the final screenplay over the following years.

Soon after, Muzzle the Pig and Blood & Tweed joined forces with British production company Mordue Pictures to help finally bring the film to fruition.

Principal photography began in October 2017 and took place at the Network Theatre in Waterloo, London, over a period of 15 days.

The official trailer was released on 5 July 2019.

=== Casting ===
Although Criminal Audition conducted traditional casting, Kaile also sourced potential actors via social media. Although there was a significant delay to filming, much of the cast stayed on for the film.

=== Filming ===
Originally, Criminal Audition was supposed to be filmed in 2013 and 2014; however, the filming process did not truly begin until 2017. The filming took place in London in one building, the Networth Theater beneath Waterloo Station. This single location was chosen to contribute to the claustrophobic feeling of the film. It was shot in tinted freeze frames in the beginning of the production. The use of VCRs and cassette players also made the setting of the eighties and early nineties come to life. The film is deliberately fast-paced, almost as if the action never stops over the course of a night.

=== Music ===
The soundtrack for the film was composed by Al Anderson and Asa Bennett, who usually collaborate under the name Bůte. The music makes extensive use of sampled sounds (a feature of Bůte‘s music where no traditional instruments or synths are used) but also uses real instruments, notably the use of Baritone guitar and whistling which is reminiscent of Ennio Moriconne’s scores.

The soundtrack was released in October 2020 to coincide with the release of the film.

== Reception ==
Sight & Sound featured the film as one of their "10 Human Horror Highlights" while Entertainment Focus included it in its "10 hidden gems you need to see" list.

In a 4/5 review, Luke Ryan Baldock of The Hollywood News praised the script and the acting, calling the film "a genuinely well-crafted feature that utilises its limitations." In his 3.5/5 review for Entertainment Focus, Pip Ellwood-Hughes stated "while not a perfect film, Criminal Audition is a strong statement of intent from two exciting new faces on the horror circuit."

== Release ==
Criminal Audition made its UK premiere at the Prince Charles Cinema in 2019. Luke Kaile and Samuel Gridley made an appearance at this event along with a few producers from their supporting companies. Mordue Productions, Muzzle the Pig, and Blood & Tweed representatives were also there to see the success of the film they backed.

Criminal Audition was released on Blu-Ray and VOD in the United States and Canada through Gravitas Ventures on October 13, 2020. It was released in the UK digitally through 101 Films on iTunes, Amazon and Sky Store on October 26, 2020.
