= Aleks Shirovs =

- EastEnders character
- Portrayed by: Kristian Kiehling
- Duration: 2014–15
- First appearance: Episode 4792; 24 January 2014
- Last appearance: Episode 5051; 16 April 2015
- Introduced by: Dominic Treadwell-Collins
In-universe information
- Occupation: Market inspector
- Wife: Marta Shirovs
- Daughters: Ineta Shirovs

Aleks Shirovs is a fictional character from the BBC soap opera EastEnders, played by Kristian Kiehling. He made his first appearance on 24 January 2014. Kiehling used to watch EastEnders to learn English and was happy to be cast on the soap, although he was initially self-conscious about his English language skills. Aleks is Latvian and is characterised as being outspoken, energetic and very serious about his business, as well as knowing what he wants and not caring on who he steps on to get it. The character is introduced as the new market inspector and many of his storylines revolve around his job, as well as his relationship with market inspector assistant Tamwar Masood (Himesh Patel). Kiehling enjoyed working with Patel and said that Tamwar was one of his favourite characters. Aleks also starts a relationship with established character Roxy Mitchell (Rita Simons), although the relationship suffers when Roxy finds out that Aleks was initially paid by her sister Ronnie Mitchell (Samantha Womack) to date her. Kiehling believed that Aleks really loved Roxy and thought they were an interesting match.

Aleks is later revealed to have a secret family in Latvia, with his wife Marta Shirovs (Noeleen Comiskey) and their daughter Ineta Shirovs (Octavia Alexandru/Gledisa Osmani). Aleks' cheating is exposed but Roxy stays with him, but their relationship suffers again when Roxy cheats on him with Ronnie's husband Charlie Cotton (Declan Bennett). Kiehling later left the role as he and the EastEnders team were not able to agree on a new contract and his exit aired on 16 April 2015, which saw him leave with his wife and daughter after being reported to the police by Tamwar for theft. His departure was kept secret in order to surprise viewers about the breakdown of Aleks and Roxy's relationship. Kiehling praised his time on the soap and said he would be happy to return, and he noted that he had received good reception from immigrants who related to some of his storylines. Aleks was generally well-received by critics and the public and Kiehling was longlisted for "Best Bad Boy" at the 2014 Inside Soap Awards. Various writers from the Daily Mirror discussed Aleks' cheating and behaviour as a market inspector, whilst a writer from Digital Spy criticised EastEnders for Aleks' exit and said he would miss the character, including his wardrobe.

== Casting and characterisation ==
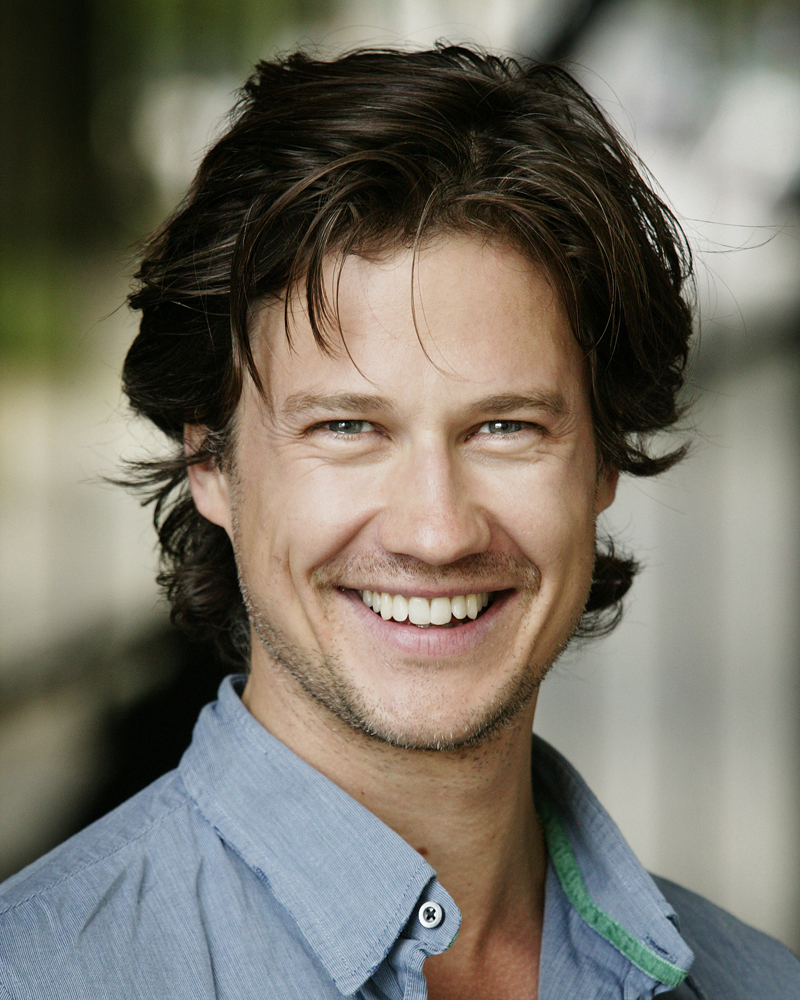
Kristian Kiehling was cast as Aleks

Aleks Shirovs was played by Danish-born German actor Kristian Kiehling. He used to watch EastEnders to learn English and credited the soap for helping perfect his English language skills. Kiehling was living in Berlin and came to the UK for one day to audition for Aleks. He was nervous at his audition but was thankful of the casting team as they were supportive and allowed him to have several takes for his audition, which he said took the pressure off him so that he was able to start acting. Afterwards, he "started the waiting process, which as a seasoned actor I'm used to. I prayed to God every day, and he or she heard me! I was so excited to hear that I had the role - I think I even did a little dance!" Kiehling was very happy to join the soap, revealing to Digital Spy, "I was thrilled because it's a great honour for me to be here, but then terrified because Britain is a country of such great talent in terms of directors and actors, so it was overwhelming." He enjoyed his first few weeks on the soap and he commented on the cast and crew being welcoming and embracing him "with open arms"; he also commented on the cast and crews' sense of "team spirit". The actor was initially self-conscious about his English language skills not being at the same level as his colleagues and was "kind of standing in the corner" during his first two weeks on set. Kiehling had previously acted in the feature film Will, which was filmed across the street from where EastEnders is filmed.

Kiehling's first appearance as Aleks aired on 24 January 2014. Aleks is Latvian and Kiehling described the character as being "very, very meticulous and he goes about his business in a very serious way, because he wants to achieve much more." The actor also described Aleks as being really tough, adding, "He goes by the book, he's eager to get ahead and he's wheeler-dealing his way through his life. Aleks is also kind of a peacock - he's very vain and wears expensive clothes. He's very sweet to the ladies, too - he's got a soft spot for beautiful women." The official BBC website described Aleks as always getting what he wants and not caring who he has to "step on" to get it, and noted that Aleks wanted a penthouse, luxury car and a "sexy girlfriend". The profile also said, "Aleks Shirovs loved the ladies nearly as much as he loved his own reflection, but don't let that fool you – deep down lay an ambitious man with big plans..." Kiehling considered Aleks to be very "outspoken, energetic and says what he thinks", as well as being a "macho guy". Kiehling believed that Aleks would make some enemies, explaining,

"He's one of those people who has a capitalist attitude and thinks that money is the only thing that counts. His attitude is bound to acquire some enemies and so far I've been involved in some pretty interesting storylines. I'm also trying to give a realistic portrayal of this character - and it will depend on people's point of view on whether he's a baddie or a goodie. I'm pretty sure that some people will see him as a bad guy, but that depends on your perspective. Aleks is not a bad at all - he's just trying to do a job!"

== Development ==
=== Introduction and job ===
In the character's backstory, Aleks initially came from Latvia to the United Kingdom temporarily with his friends to make money before going back, but he ended up staying as he loved the lifestyle of living in London. Alek's BBC profile revealed, "He got a proper job in Walford, whipping the market (and poor Tamwar!) into shape and didn't see himself returning home any time soon - especially with so many feisty females in Walford to flirt with!" In the months following his introduction, Aleks is characterised as being secretive about his life in Latvia. Kiehling teased that Aleks is leading a double life and that there is something about Aleks' background that is not initially revealed when he debuts. The actor called Aleks a two-sided character and explained that EastEnders executive producer Dominic Treadwell-Collins said that Aleks is "Batman character when he's doing a job but then he's also Bruce Wayne!" Kiehling hoped that Aleks would get in a lot of trouble and get involved in dramatic and funny situations with the market and his lovelife.

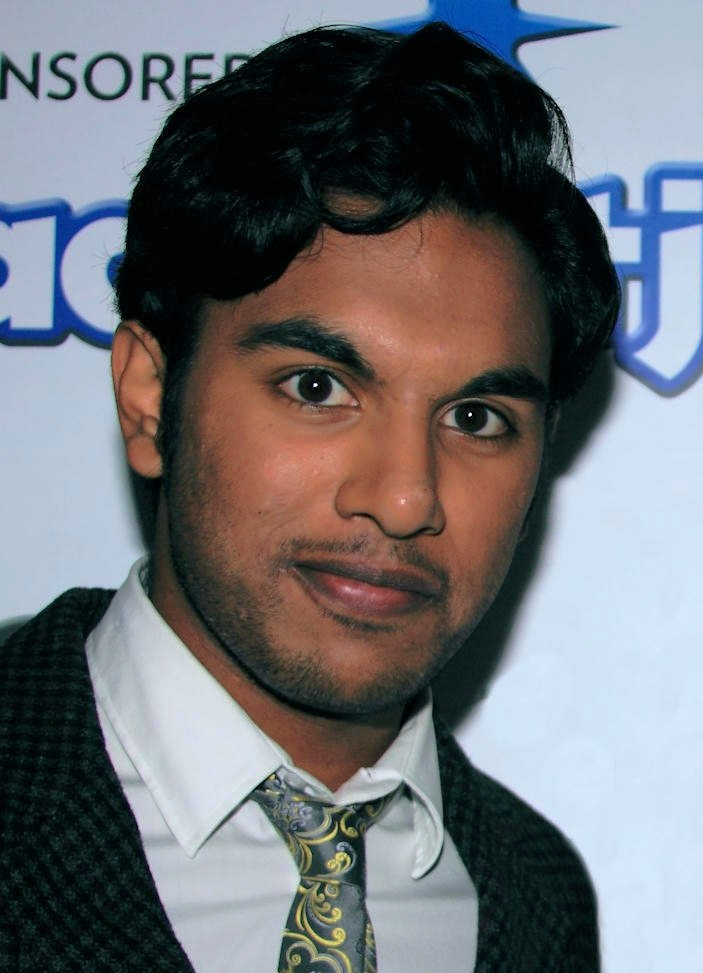
Kiehling enjoyed working with Himesh Patel (pictured)

Aleks is introduced as the new market manager of Bridge Street market. When he begins his role, he puts assistant market inspector Tamwar Masood (Himesh Patel) on probation and tells him he needs to prove himself to keep his job. One of Kiehling's first scenes was telling Tamwar off, and he liked working with Patel as he liked his "very beautiful style". Kiehling explained that Tamwar and Aleks clash right away as Aleks wants to be in charge too, adding, "He's the boss, so he's introducing himself to Tamwar as that. I imagine it's a pretty terrifying experience for poor Tamwar!" However, the actor believed that there could be common ground between Tamwar and Aleks due to both of them being slightly outsiders. In 2015, Kiehling said, "Tamwar was actually one of my favourite characters and I really regret that we didn't have more scenes together. I had a fabulous relationship with Himesh, who plays the character. It was quite fun to treat him very badly on screen - we both really enjoyed playing that". Aleks also works with Kat Slater (Jessie Wallace) and Bianca Jackson (Patsy Palmer), who often break the rules on the market, and one of Aleks' first conversations with the pair is about being a bit of an outsider. Regarding Kat and Bianca's rule breaking, Kiehling explained that Aleks' weak point is beautiful women and he thus does not deal with them the same way that he would deal with men breaking the rules, adding, "He tries to sweet-talk them on one hand and be firm on the other, but it won't be an easy relationship". The actor remembered Wallace and Palmer from his English lessons and found it "terrifying" to meet them in real-life, but found them to be very sweet, adding, "I lost my terror the moment we met, which was great". He found Wallace to be very welcoming and Palmer to be comedic, and she called him Robert Redford.

In February 2014, the traders of Bridge Street market revolt when they find out about the council's secret plans to shut it down, and Peter Beale (Ben Hardy) clashes with Aleks when he confronts Peter about the protests. In April of that same year, Aleks ends up worrying many of the residents when he suggests that Bridge Street market may be shut down and he is cornered by several residents. Later that month, Lucy Beale (Hetti Bywater) was killed off, starting a long-running Whodunit storyline dubbed Who Killed Lucy Beale?; Danny Hatchard, who played Lee Carter, thought that it would be good if Aleks had killed Lucy, explaining, "The only reason I say that is because Lucy was a cocaine addict - nobody knows where she was getting the drugs from, and all of a sudden he [Aleks] shows up..." In June 2014, Bianca, who is struggling financially, makes a "dodgy deal" with Aleks, who allows her to sell "dodgy" fake tan on her stall on the condition that he gets parts of the profit and some cash upfront. That same month, Aleks fines Alfie Moon (Shane Richie) for selling "dodgy" ice cream on the market without a food license, which horrifies Alfie.

=== Relationship with Roxy and secret family ===
Aleks begins a relationship with a established character Roxy Mitchell (Rita Simons). The relationship suffers after Roxy finds out that her sister Ronnie Mitchell (Samantha Womack) initially paid Aleks to date her. Ronnie disapproves of Aleks dating Roxy and warns Aleks that she will be watching him. Kiehling found Aleks and Roxy to be an "interesting combination" and believed that Aleks was drawn and attracted to Roxy as he had found his match in her. Kiehling enjoyed working with Simons and Womack, revealing in 2015, "Rita was a great on-screen partner and made me laugh a lot in between scenes. With Rita and Sam Womack together on set, I had a hell of a time keeping a straight face".

Spoilers in June 2014 revealed that Roxy would become "extremely unhappy" when she finds out that Aleks has a secret wife and daughter in Latvia that he did not tell her about. In the storyline that aired the following month, Tamwar and Alfie find out Aleks' secret and they tell Roxy, who is angry that Aleks has been lying to her, and so she angrily confronts him. It was teased that she would plan revenge on Aleks for his betrayal. Roxy gets her vengeance by putting laxatives in Aleks' food with the help of her relative, Lola Pearce (Danielle Harold). Roxy later gives Aleks a one-way ticket to Latvia and tells him to return to where he belongs. Alex says that he will stay in Albert Square but will not divorce Ineta.

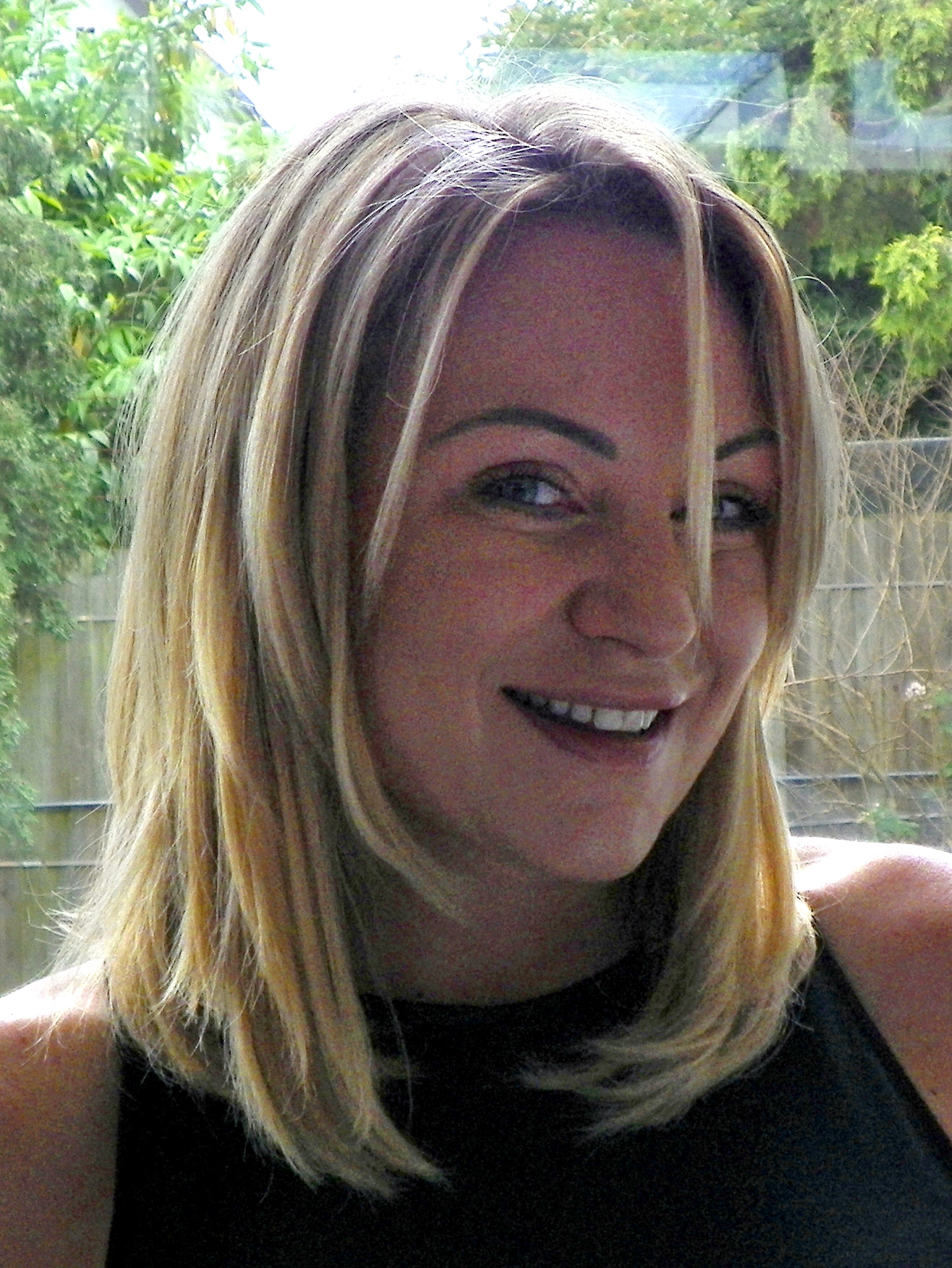
Rita Simmons portrays Roxy, Aleks' love interest

When Aleks sees his wife Marta Shirovs (Noeleen Comiskey) and their daughter Ineta Shirovs (Octavia Alexandru/Gledisa Osmani) arriving in Albert Square, Aleks takes Roxy on holiday. Upon the couple's return, Roxy asks Aleks to move in with her as she does not want to be apart from him, but he is distracted and ends up meeting Ineta and Marta. Aleks then betrays Roxy when he gets passionate with Marta, unable to resist her "charms", and he tells Marta and Ineta that he will meet them at the B&B. Initial spoilers showed that Aleks would pack his bags and leave, but did not specify whether he would go to live with Roxy or Marta and Ineta or where he would go. He then continues to lead a double life, with neither Marta or Roxy aware that Aleks is seeing the other. However, Alek's "deception" catches up with him when he continues to lie to Roxy; he buys Roxy a dress to make up for his absence, but is forced to give it to Marta when she arrives in Albert Square and sees the dress. He buys an identical dress for Roxy but he is "horrified" when Marta sees them "looking cosy" and she is furious, though he is able to "nervously" lie his way out by telling Marta that Roxy was just a drunk stranger. Ronnie's fiancé Charlie Cotton (Declan Bennett) later finds out about Marta being married to Aleks and he angrily warns Aleks that he will tell Roxy the truth if he does not ask for a divorce from Marta on that day. Months later, Ineta warms to Roxy and becomes closer to her when Roxy takes actions after finding out about bruises that Ineta has gotten at her school. It is revealed that Ineta is being bullied at her school.

There had been a discussion within the EastEnders team to show Roxy and Aleks go on holiday to Latvia, although this did not end up happening. Kiehling wished that the soap had gone to Latvia to explain Aleks' character, explaining, "Going to Latvia with the BBC crew would have been great to show the people where this character came from and what Latvia actually is. You always have the Polish builders and the cafe workers in shows and they always have a silly accent and they get on your nerves – seeing where they live would have been beautiful for all sides." Discussing Aleks' character development, Kiehling explained in 2015, "In the beginning we were trying to figure out what type of character Aleks would eventually be. There was the dark side, but then there was also the side of him that tried to get away from where he came from and assimilate into the country where he now lived and worked. Who could foretell that his wife would turn up?! Things happen but I think he wasn't a bad character deep inside."

In 2015, Roxy cheats on Aleks by having sex with Charlie whilst Ronnie is in a coma. EastEnders producer Sharon Batten then teased on This Morning, "I can exclusively reveal that Aleks will buy a ring for Roxy, but with Charlie never that far away, what will Roxy do?" In the storyline, Charlie plans to propose to Roxy and asks her cousin Phil Mitchell (Steve McFadden) for permission to do so; however, Aleks then finds out about her cheating with Charlie after overhearing their conversation. Aleks then presents Roxy with the engagement ring before asking her how her long she has been having sex with Charlie, leaving her "horrified". Simons, who portrays Roxy, believed that Roxy did not love Aleks, "Aleks is absolutely not right for Roxy - she doesn't love him. She doesn't even like him, but he has a pulse and a pretty face and some money, and that's all she really cares about because she's always been left on the shelf. He came along, showed her attention and she settled, which is what Roxy always does." Simons also explained that Roxy is using Aleks in a way by being with him to get her out of the situation with Charlie. Kiehling believed that Aleks loved and probably still loves Roxy, and that he would have probably gone through with his plan to marry Roxy if things had been different, adding, "Aleks knew Roxy was a handful - I had to really be on guard because Rita is such a forceful actress and her character is great. I think it was a great combination and maybe that's why it captured people's attention, because we had this guy who was on the cold side and not very temperamental, trying to keep this beautiful woman who is like dynamite!"

=== Departure ===
Aleks was written out of the soap and made an unannounced departure on 16 April 2015, ending his 15 month stint. Aleks' exit storyline saw him leave Walford over fears that the dodgy deals he had made in the market would "come back and bite him". At the same time that Aleks is livid with Roxy for her cheating, Tamwar makes an "incriminating discovery" regarding Aleks and the market, and when he confronts Aleks, the market inspector fires Tamwar for interfering. It is revealed that Aleks has been overcharging rent on the market traders and keeping the money for himself. Tamwar reports Aleks and he flees with Marta and Ineta; Roxy considers leaving with him but realises that he should be with his family and hence encourages Aleks to go with them instead, and so the pair have a "emotional farewell". Following the broadcast of the episode, an EastEnders spokesperson confirmed that Kiehling had left the role and Digital Spy reported that Aleks' exit had been kept a secret by EastEnders in order to surprise viewers about the breakdown of Roxy and Aleks' relationship.

"I'm obviously sad! As always when a job ends, it's time for reflection. I had a fabulous time filming there at EastEnders. I had a brilliant on-screen partner Rita, who plays Roxy, and I also had a fabulous little daughter Gledisa who played Ineta in the show. I was so lucky to have this great team of writers who really provided me with many opportunities for great situations and great lines."

— Kiehling on Aleks' exit (2015)

Kiehling explained that his departure was a mutual decision as he and EastEnders bosses could not agree on the terms of a new contract, and so it was decided that he would leave the soap. Whilst the actor said he was very sad to leave the role, he explained that the door had been left open for him to return and that he would be "honoured" to come back to the soap. He recalled that people recognised him from the soap on the streets of London, which he found interesting, and that immigrants related to Aleks' storyline, which Kiehling said, " was a great experience to be in touch with the audience in that way", explaining, "I felt that the lines and scenes that the writers provided me with were very relevant. It meant that I could really do something and there was a resonance with the audience. I really enjoyed that and I'm really thankful for it". Kiehling's final scene was set in the hospital, and afterwards he was presented with an EastEnders sign filled with messages from the cast and the producer made a speech about how Aleks had been well-received by viewers. Kiehling had worked with most of the cast and said that he found it difficult to make the decision to move on from the soap despite usually not wanting to stay in a single place for too long. Kiehling also hoped to work in the UK again in the future, and he took part in humanitarian project supporting migrants after leaving EastEnders.

Discussing his exit, Kiehling revealed that he had emailed Treadwell-Collins with an idea about Aleks' departure storyline, which was based on the 1909 Tottenham Outrage; the storyline would have featured Aleks holed up in the Queen Vic with the whole cast, and Kiehling suggested that Nigel Farage could have been a guest star for the storyline. Ultimately, this was rejected as it was over the budget, and Kiehling said that the chosen "muted" exit fit better as he believed that Latvians were generally not temperamental, explaining, "Aleks Shirovs was not political - he was a selfish guy thinking only of his career! I can totally understand why Dominic said it was a bit too far." Of the character's actual exit, Kiehling explained that Aleks had stolen money to pay for the ring that he got Roxy and that the character was trying to make things work due to London being so expensive, which the actor had witnessed himself when he first came to London in 2005. Whilst filming, Kiehling was aware that he was portraying an immigrant and did not want to portray Aleks as too dark, explaining, "The show is not only about entertainment - there's also a responsibility because the immigrants are in the minority and you had to be careful not to have Aleks too much on the margins of society, because then people start pointing fingers and the whole UKIP thing was going on anyway. So it was a tricky thing. The other side of it is that if you look at the EastEnders storylines and who's pocketing money and who's killing who, there's lots of dodgy stuff going on. I actually was quite a small light in the whole crime scene! So I wasn't too concerned and I actually enjoyed playing that". Kiehling hoped that producers of EastEnders and other projects would continue to have more Eastern European characters and hire more immigrants, and he said:

"I really cannot express my admiration and my gratitude enough for the BBC crew who decided to finally introduce a permanent Eastern European character into EastEnders. 7 to 9 million people watch the show and they meet Eastern European people every day. They're not just the builders who construct your home anymore, they are in finance, they're doctors, they're nurses, they're everywhere. The reality has changed and if people say Eastern European people are not enough part of society to be given parts in films, it's wrong because you just have to look around."

== Storylines ==
Aleks begins his job as the market inspector of Bridge Street market in Walford and immediately puts assistant market inspector Tamwar Masood (Himesh Patel) on probation, telling him he needs to prove himself to keep his job. He tells Tamwar that there are plans to merge the markets and when this leaked by Tamwar's sister Shabnam Masood (Rakhee Thakrar), the market traders rally together. Jake rents a flat with Jake Stone (Jamie Lomas) and Tosh Mackintosh (Rebecca Scroggs) later moves in with them. Aleks starts dating Roxy Mitchell (Rita Simons) after being ordered to by Roxy's sister, Ronnie Mitchell (Samantha Womack). Ronnie is angry when Aleks continues his relationship with Roxy and Roxy finds out that Ronnie paid Aleks to be with her, but the pair stay together. When Alfie Moon (Shane Richie) becomes suspicious of Aleks talking to someone in Latvian online, and after being thrown out by Aleks, he works with Tamwar to hack into Aleks' laptop to see what he is hiding. They find out that Aleks has been contacting his wife and tell Roxy, who confronts him during a romantic meal. Aleks says he has been talking to his daughter Ineta Shirovs (Octavia Alexandru/Gledisa Osmani) and that he is married to her mother Marta Shirovs (Noeleen Comiskey) but insists that they are separated. Roxy throws Aleks out and buys him tickets to go to Latvia, but at the last minute stops him and says she still wants to be with him. Alfie and Aleks have tension after Alfie makes remarks about Aleks' marital status and the tension worsens after Aleks gives Alfie's pitch to rival market trader Donna Yates (Lisa Hammond).

Aleks arranges a surprise holiday for him and Roxy and he avoids Ineta and Marta when they come to Walford from Latvia. When he returns, he moves in with Roxy but he has sex with Marta. The embrace is seen by Ronnie's partner, Charlie Cotton (Declan Bennett), who demands that Aleks tell Roxy, but Marta tells her before either of them can. A devastated Roxy throws Aleks out but she invites him to move back in as her feelings for him are too strong. Marta returns to Latvia and leaves Ineta with Aleks as she believes that their daughter will be better off in England. After Charlie and Ronnie are in a car crash on their wedding day, Aleks supports Charlie with their new-born son Matthew Mitchell-Cotton whilst Ronnie is in a coma. Aleks finds out that Roxy and Charlie have had sex and he goes to tell Ronnie in hospital but cannot bring himself to do so. Aleks presents Roxy with an engagement ring and reveals that he knows about the affair. Tamwar finds out that Aleks has been charging extra rent on the traders and keeping the money for himself and Aleks fires Tamwar when he is confronted and bins the evidence. Tamwar tells the police and Ineta calls Marta as she overhears Aleks' conversation about moving away. Roxy is torn over whether to leave with Aleks but Marta convinces her that she would be breaking up a family, so she tells Aleks to leave with Ineta and Marta. Aleks tells Roxy that they will never see each other again and so she kisses him goodbye and returns her engagement ring. Aleks then leaves with Marta and Ineta before the police can arrest him.

== Reception ==
Kiehling's portrayal of an Eastern European character was well-received, with the actor revealing, "A lot of people approach me on the streets from an immigrant background. I remember a father of a child talking to me about a scene in which my daughter was being bullied at school and he related to it. I was really glad that I seemed to be taking part in a political and social debate in British homes." Kiehling revealed that a producer of EastEnders revealed that crew members of the soap were "surprised that a foreigner with an accent was welcomed and well-liked by lots of the audience so quickly". For his role as Aleks, Kiehling was longlisted for "Best Bad Boy" at the 2014 Inside Soap Awards.

The day of his debut, Sarah Deen from Metro called Aleks "shifty" and believed that his debut had been completed overlooked by viewers' appreciation of Danny Dyer as Mick Carter. The following month, Deen's colleague, Vicky Prior, praised Aleks for being "well rounded" and not just sticking to one particular storyline. That same month, Tony Stewart from the Daily Mirror opined that it had been a "big week" for Aleks and Peter due to the protests about the council's secret plans to shut down Bridge Street market and Aleks' "showdown" with Peter. Stewart also called Aleks "dishonest" and added, "will the protests and a public meeting change the council's mind? Not if corrupt Aleks stands to make a few bob". Stewart's colleague, Jane Simon, later opined that Aleks was "armed with rules that never bothered anyone when [previously market manager] Mr Lister was in charge" in reference to Aleks fining Alfie over selling ice cream. Simon also believed that Aleks should "think twice about making an enemy" of Alfie due to what Alfie had seen on Aleks' laptop.

In February 2015, following the revelation of who killed Lucy, Owen Tonks from Heat reported that bookmakers William Hill had Aleks on their list of current EastEnders characters that could be murdered next. Daniel Welsh from HuffPost called Aleks' secret marriage in Latvia a "shocking secret" and opined that Aleks "might want to watch his back from hereon in" due to seeming like Roxy would not rest until she got revenge on Aleks; he also believed that viewers could enjoy Roxy's confrontation of Aleks. Welsh added that ever since Aleks' debut, he had been "very secretive about his old life in his home country of Latvia and now it's clear why...he's been leading a double life and hiding a secret marriage from everyone". Danny Walker from the Daily Mirror opined that Aleks and Roxy had not had the best start in their relationship due to Roxy finding out about Aleks being paid to date her by Ronnie, and he further wrote that there was nothing holding Roxy back when she finds out about his secret family and that there is "nothing worse than a Mitchell scorned". He added, "Just when you thought Albert Square was heated enough things are about to step up a gear", believing that the scenes where Roxy finds out about Aleks' betrayal were "very heated". Walker's colleague, colleague, Jane Simon, believed that Aleks' popularity would "nose- dive" after Roxy confronts him about his secret family. Katy Brent from the same website said that she could not wait to see the "further adventures" of Roxy getting revenge and wrote, "Latvian Loverman Aleks had all the smug wiped from him when Roxy revealed she knew about his wife and child". She believed that Roxy's initial revenge of putting laxatives in his food was "pretty lame" but noted that Aleks had gotten off better than Roxy's previous boyfriends after they had crossed her. Brent also wrote of Aleks:

"Aleks really knows how to treat the ladies. It must've been tough for Roxy to make the decision to ditch Aleks, what with him being so smooth. In fact, all men should pay attention to Aleks and how he charms the ladies. Remember, he had TWO women on the go. To the untrained eye, he may look like a buffoon with a big blow dry, but this man is a pick-up artist extraordinaire. It's not hard to see why. Those pig noises he made at Roxy while she ate – hot."

Brent later opined that Aleks had faced "casual racism" from Roxy when she told him to go back where he belongs. She also wrote that Aleks was not against "a bit of adultery" and that Roxy had gone from "having the upper hand" to Aleks to then "pretty much being slapped by it". In October 2014, Brent commented on Aleks lying to his wife and saying he loves on the same day as moving in with Roxy; she believed that he "clearly" had a "death wish" due to his "blatant" lies despite the danger of the Mitchell family, and questioned whether Ronnie had not already freaked him out when she paid him to date Roxy. Tess Lamacraft from the Daily Mirror called Aleks "shifty" and wrote, "It's not surprising we never see bouffant-haired market inspector Aleks doing any inspecting, the man is far too busy juggling the demands of petulant Roxy while also trying to keep his wife on the other side of the English Channel."

Sophie Dainty from Digital Spy believed that Aleks' deception to Marta and Roxy was "catching up with him" when Charlie found out about Aleks seeing Marta. Her colleague, Daniel Kilkelly, opined that Aleks' luck has possibly run out after he was given the ultimatum from Charlie. Kilkelly had previously opined that Aleks was a "tough" market inspector that immediately made an impact when he put Tamwar on probation. Regarding "ruthless" Aleks' firing of Tamwar shortly before his exit, Kilkelly opined that Tamwar had been the victim of Aleks' "ruthless side" and that everything appeared to be "crashing down around" Aleks. Kayleigh Dray from Closer Online believed that Charlie could possibly change his mind about proposing to Roxy after finding out that she had cheated with Charlie, commenting, "Only in Walford, eh?" Dray added, "one thing's for sure, we DEFINITELY don't want Aleks to leave Albert Square anytime soon." Digital Spy's Kilkelly believed that the scenes where Aleks gives Roxy the wedding ring before asking about her cheating were surprising and believed that the revelation could "tear them apart for good". The Daily Mirror's Danny Walker believed that Aleks was playing "mind games" when he asked about the cheating after presenting the ring. Walker also called the scene a "twist and a half" and "messy". He also wrote, "The hard-nosed boss of the market has been dating Roxy for a while now and viewers almost felt sorry for him when his girlfriend strayed."

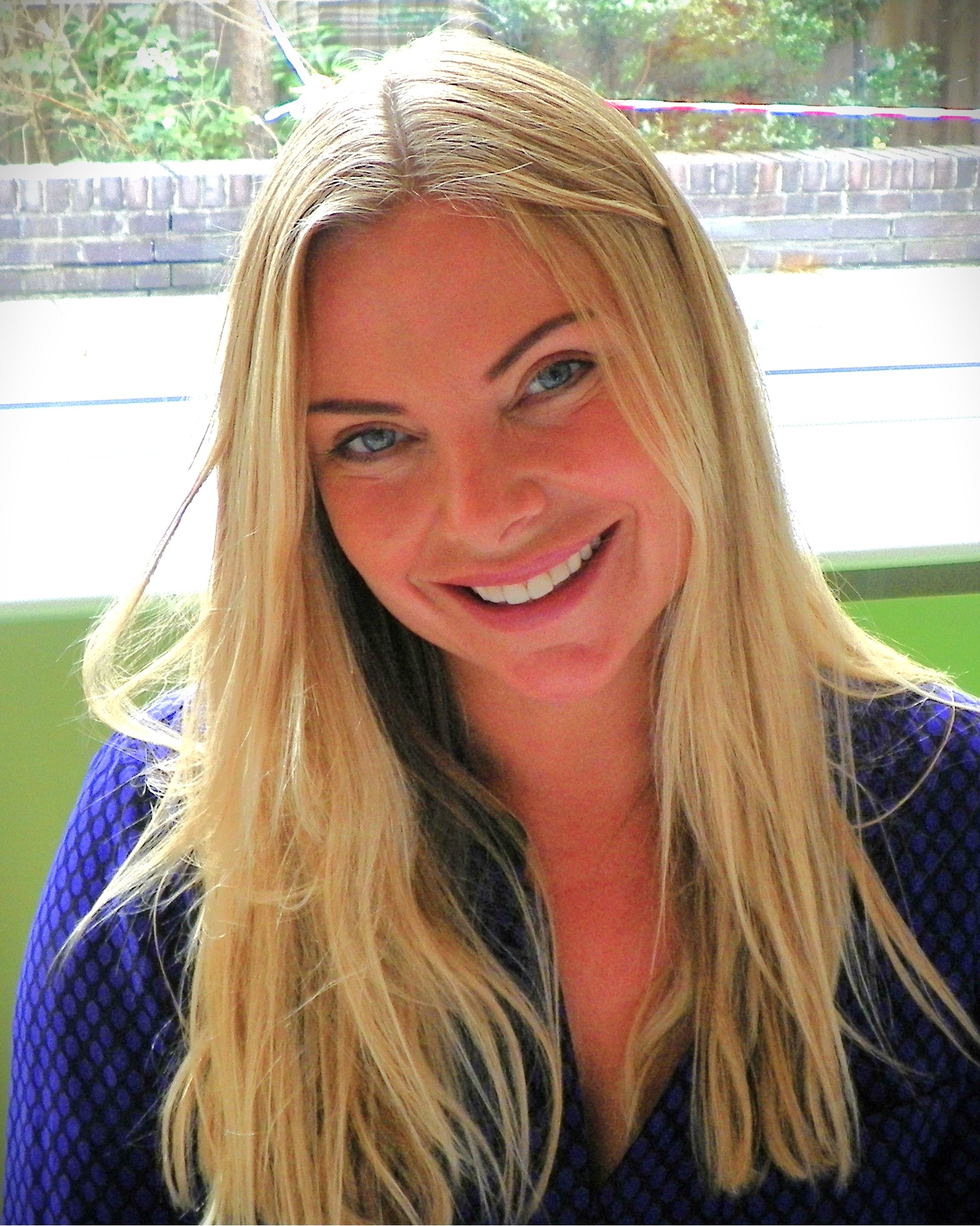
Aleks was speculated to be the secret stalker of Ronnie, played by Samantha Womack (pictured)

A writer from BBC noted how Aleks was not very far from his ideal lifestyle when he was with Roxy until she had the affair with Charlie. A writer from Oxford Mail called Aleks a "dodgy market inspector" and believed that Aleks had left EastEnders in "proper soap fashion – in the back a cab with just one suitcase". Kilkelly called him a "tough-talking character" and called his farewell to Roxy "emotional". Following Aleks' departure, Ryan Love from Digital Spy's Soap Spy column wrote an article on whether he believed that Aleks would be missed. Love said that had the departure aired a year ago, he would not have cared, but he had since "grown fond of Aleks and his wonderful wardrobe" and felt that his exit was untimely. He believed that Aleks had been sacrificed as part of the plot around Roxy and Charlie and that he missed Aleks and Roxy's relationship, which Love called "fun to watch". Love believed that Aleks could have become a great character in his own right, writing, "He wasn't the easiest character to get to like, that's for sure, but something clicked when he was paired with Roxy - a new, fun Aleks with a quick wit was a character I could get on board with. He maintained his no-nonsense, quite-often abrasive nature when dealing with the market traders, but who wouldn't snap the odd time when you're dealing with that lot?" Love believed that Aleks' secret family twist was a bit random but liked the family unit that he built with Roxy, and also praised how Aleks dealt with Alfie's comments that had racist undertones and how Aleks asked Roxy how long she had been cheating with Charlie, which Love called "bloody priceless". Love also felt that Aleks being revealed as having taken money was a random plot that was intended to make viewers dislike him before his departure, with Love commenting, "Sorry, that doesn't work on me. It felt disingenuous to his character, and an unnecessary 'twist' to suggest that a foreign worker was conning people out of money to send out of the country to his family." Love added that he would miss Aleks' wardrobe and "magnificent hair".

In 2016, Dainty put Aleks on her list of nine EastEnders characters who could be Ronnie's mystery stalker, writing, "Aleks was always a man of mystery and we still feel a little sad about his very premature exit last year. The market inspector rubbed more than a few people up the wrong way during his short-lived stint on the Square, and unsurprisingly Ronnie was among them". She questioned whether Aleks had turned the tables on Ronnie after she said that she would be watching him, and noted that Kiehling had said that he could return to the soap one day. That same year, Kilkelly put Aleks on his list of seven characters that left EastEnders too soon, writing, "He was cocky, vain, bossy and genuinely terrifying for poor Tamwar Masood at the market, so Aleks Shirovs was never going to be the easiest character to like. Fortunately, though, actor Kristian Kiehling brought an unexpected charm to the role, providing Roxy Mitchell with her best on-screen relationship in years. Ronnie's character was impacted positively too, as she was given an on-screen rivalry that didn't involve murderous threats or trips to the car crusher. Phew!" However, Kilkelly believed that it "all turned sour" in April 2015, when Alex left Roxy and Walford due to various problems, including Roxy cheating with Charlie, Aleks having a secret wife and "some nonsense about him conning the market out of money too". Kilkelly opined that Kiehling was "enigmatic as his character" as when he was interviewed by Digital Spy, who were "confused" by his departure, he did not reveal much about why he had chosen to leave the soap.
