= Kristian Kiehling =

German actor

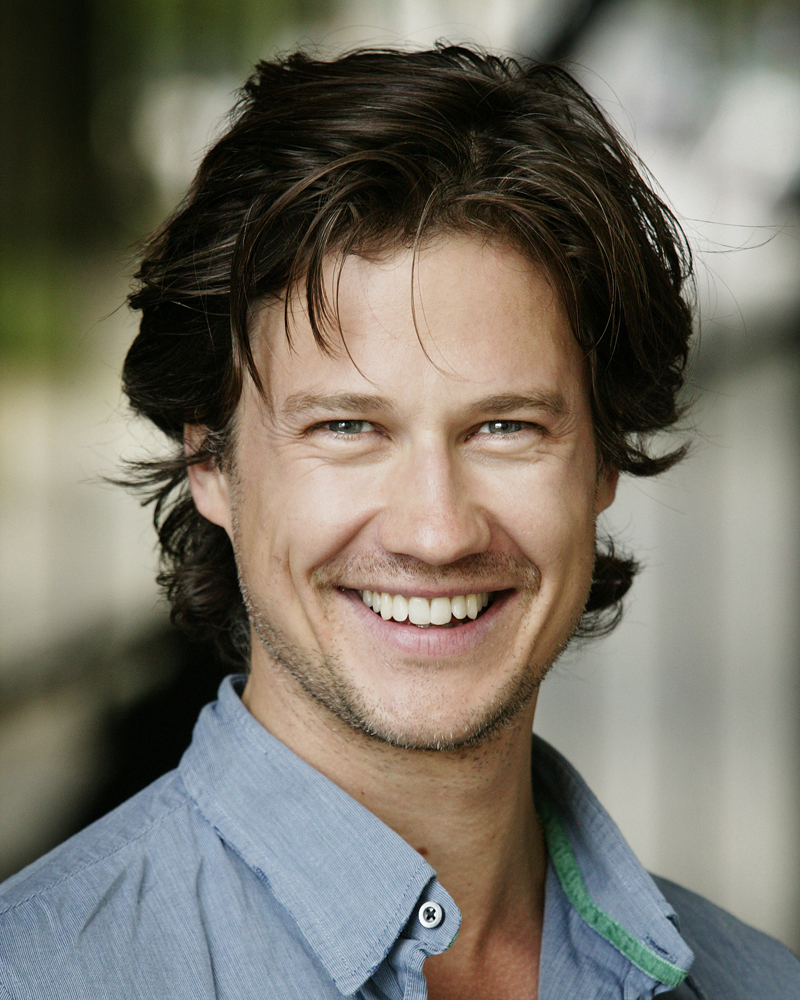
- Born: Kristian Kiehling; 17 September 1976 (age 49); Holstebro, Denmark
- Other names: KK, Kristian Erik Kiehling, Kristian Killing
- Occupation: Actor
- Years active: 1997–present
- Television: EastEnders (2014–15)

Kristian Kiehling (born 17 September 1976) is a German television film and stage actor, and filmmaker. In Germany he is known for A2 Racer (2004), Tsunami: Terror in the North Sea (2005) and Verbotene Liebe (2013); and in Britain for All the Small Things (2009) and Will (2011). In January 2014, Kiehling became a regular in the British soap opera EastEnders, playing Aleks Shirovs. He left the show in 2015 due to a contractual dispute. His directorial debut, Chronicle of a Summer in Europe, was premiered as the documentary centerpiece at the Lighthouse International Film Festival in 2016.

== Life and career ==
After finishing high school in Germany, Kiehling received acting training at the Mozarteum University of Salzburg, Austria from 1997 until 2000. He took acting jobs during his studies and appeared in 1997 in his first German TV series, Alphateam – Die Lebensretter im OP.

Since 2000, he has appeared in numerous German, English and international television and film productions.

In 2007, he first appeared on British television as Rolf Voller in the BBC series Waking the Dead, in the two-part episode "Double Bind". Two years later, he played Nemanja Radic in All the small things. In 2011, he appeared in Will, with Damian Lewis and Bob Hoskins. In 2013, Kiehling had a role in the German TV series Verbotene Liebe. In 2014, he debuted as Aleks Shirovs in the BBC soap opera EastEnders, a role which he played until April 2015.

On stage, Kiehling performed with the Theatre Schauspielhaus Köln from 2001 until 2002, with the Studiotheater Stuttgart in 2003 and in 2004, and with The Royal Court Theatre in 2008.

== Filmography ==
Year	Film	Role	Notes
1997	Alphateam – Die Lebensretter im OP	Kalle	Episode 1.14
1997	S.O.S Barracuda	Jens	Episode 1.1
1997	Buddies	Young Rimkeit	TV film
1997	Eine Herzensangelegenheit	Luis	TV film
1998	Balko	Axel Langensiep	Episode 3.7
1999	Dr. Sommerfeld – Neues vom Bülowbogen	Mark	Episode 3.1
2000	Im Namen des Gesetzes	Elmar Jeschke	Episode 5.12
2003	Der Preis der Wahrheit	Leo Hanser	TV film
2003	Wilde Jungs	Torben Kleinert	TV film
2003	Berlin, Berlin	Joshua	Episode 2.2
2003	Fast perfekt verlobt	Fritz von Seckbach	TV film
2003	Hallo Robbie!	Dirk Clausen	Episode 2.6
2003–11	Küstenwache	Felix Arp/Stefan Rering/Karl Anthoff	Episodes 6.7/11.18/14.25
2004	Die Wache	Max Decker	Episode 10.5
2004	A2 Racer	Ecki	
2004	Pura vida Ibiza	Ben	
2005	Leipzig Homicide	Tim Holsten	Episode 7.11
2005	Rosamunde Pilcher	George Pearson	Episode 1.55: Über den Wolken
2005	Arme Millionäre	Timo	4 episodes
2005	Tsunami: Terror in the North Sea	Jaan	TV film
2005	Scharf wie Chili	Tino Koester	TV film
2005	Unser Charly	Rainer	Episode 10.2
2005–10	Das Traumschiff	Tom/Roland Wagner	Episodes 1.51/1.62
2006	Polizeiruf 110	Helge Dombrowski	Episode 35.4
2007	The Bill	Yevgen Kucuk	Episode 23.13
2007	Zu schön für mich	Andreas	TV film
2007	Family	Paul	Short film
2007	I Want Candy	German Man	
2007	Waking the Dead	Rolf Voller	Episode 6.9 and 6.10
2007	Speed Dating	Tim	Short film
2008	Novaya Zemlya	Lieutenant Anderson	
2008	Final Proclamation	Andrea Conti	TV film
2008	The Royal Today	Ivan	Episode 1.18
2008	Das Traumhotel	Fabian Boehme	Episode 1.10
2008	Old Peter's Russian Tales	Voice	
2008	My Mother's Tears	Micha	
2009	In aller Freundschaft	David Engel	5 episodes
2009	All the Small Things	Nemanja Radic	6 episodes
2009	Rumpelstiltskin	Prinz Moritz	TV film
2010	Inga Lindström	Jonas Laksson	Episode 8.3: Schatten der Vergangenheit
2010	Stuttgart Homicide	Ingo Fohlbach	Episode 1.7
2010	SOKO 5113	Markus Kaminski	Episode 35.15
2011	Kreuzfahrt ins Glück	Tobias	Episode 6.1
2011	Немец	Kurt Scherhorn	8 episodes
2011	Will	Alek	
2011	SIX	Andrei	Short film
2012	Atlilar	Biyan	Episode 1.1
2013	Verbotene Liebe	Juri Adam	Episodes 4291 – 4402
2014–15	EastEnders	Aleks Shirovs	Regular role

== Stage appearances ==
Year	Play	Role	Theatre
1999	Short Stories		Mozarteum, Charleville Festivals
2000–2001	Schattenjungs	Tommy	Schauspielhaus Köln
2000–2002	Geist		Schauspielhaus Köln
2001–2002	Du lach nicht, aber das bin ich	Solo Performance	Schauspielhaus Köln
2001–2002	Der Streit	Mesrin	Schauspielhaus Köln
2001–2002	Leonce und Lena		Schauspielhaus Köln
2002	Graf Öderland		Schauspielhaus Köln
2003	The killer in me is the killer in you my love	Surbeck	Studiotheater Stuttgart
2004	Paradies	Fuchs	Wagenhalle Stuttgart
2008	Oxford Street	Aleksander	Royal Court Theatre
