= Babe Smith =

Fictional character from EastEnders

- EastEnders character
- Portrayed by: Annette Badland
- Duration: 2014–2017
- First appearance: Episode 4796; 31 January 2014
- Last appearance: Episode 5438; 9 February 2017
- Created by: Dominic Treadwell-Collins
- Introduced by: Dominic Treadwell-Collins
In-universe information
- Other names: Aunt Babe
- Occupation: Merchant navy stewardess; Baby farmer; Drug dealer; Pub chef
- Mother: Edna Smith
- Sisters: Sylvie Carter
- Nieces: Shirley Carter; Tina Carter
- Other relatives: Mick Carter; Lee Carter; Nancy Carter; Johnny Carter; Ollie Carter; Dean Wicks

Babe Smith (also known as Aunt Babe) is a fictional character from the BBC soap opera EastEnders, played by Annette Badland. She first appeared in episode 4796 of the show, originally broadcast in the United Kingdom on 31 January 2014, and was introduced as the maternal aunt of established characters Shirley Carter (Linda Henry) and Tina Carter (Luisa Bradshaw-White). She was introduced as part of a set of new characters that expanded the Carter family across 2013 and 2014, headed by executive producer Dominic Treadwell-Collins. Babe and Badland's casting were announced on 12 December 2013.

Babe's storylines have mostly revolved around her relationship with the Carter family, most notably the delicate relationship with her sister Sylvie Carter (Linda Marlowe) and the unrequited love for her brother-in-law Stan Carter (Timothy West). Babe's other storylines have included her past baby farming, encouraging Abi Branning (Lorna Fitzgerald) to fake a pregnancy, blackmailing Les Coker (Roger Sloman), leading to her subsequent feud with Claudette Hubbard (Ellen Thomas), and being locked in a freezer and left to die by an unknown assailant, who was later revealed to be Abi. The decision not to renew Badland's contract was announced on 18 September 2016, with Babe scheduled to depart from the series in 2017, three years after her debut. Badland made her final appearance in episode 5438, originally broadcast in the United Kingdom on 9 February 2017.

== Creation and development ==
=== Casting and introduction ===
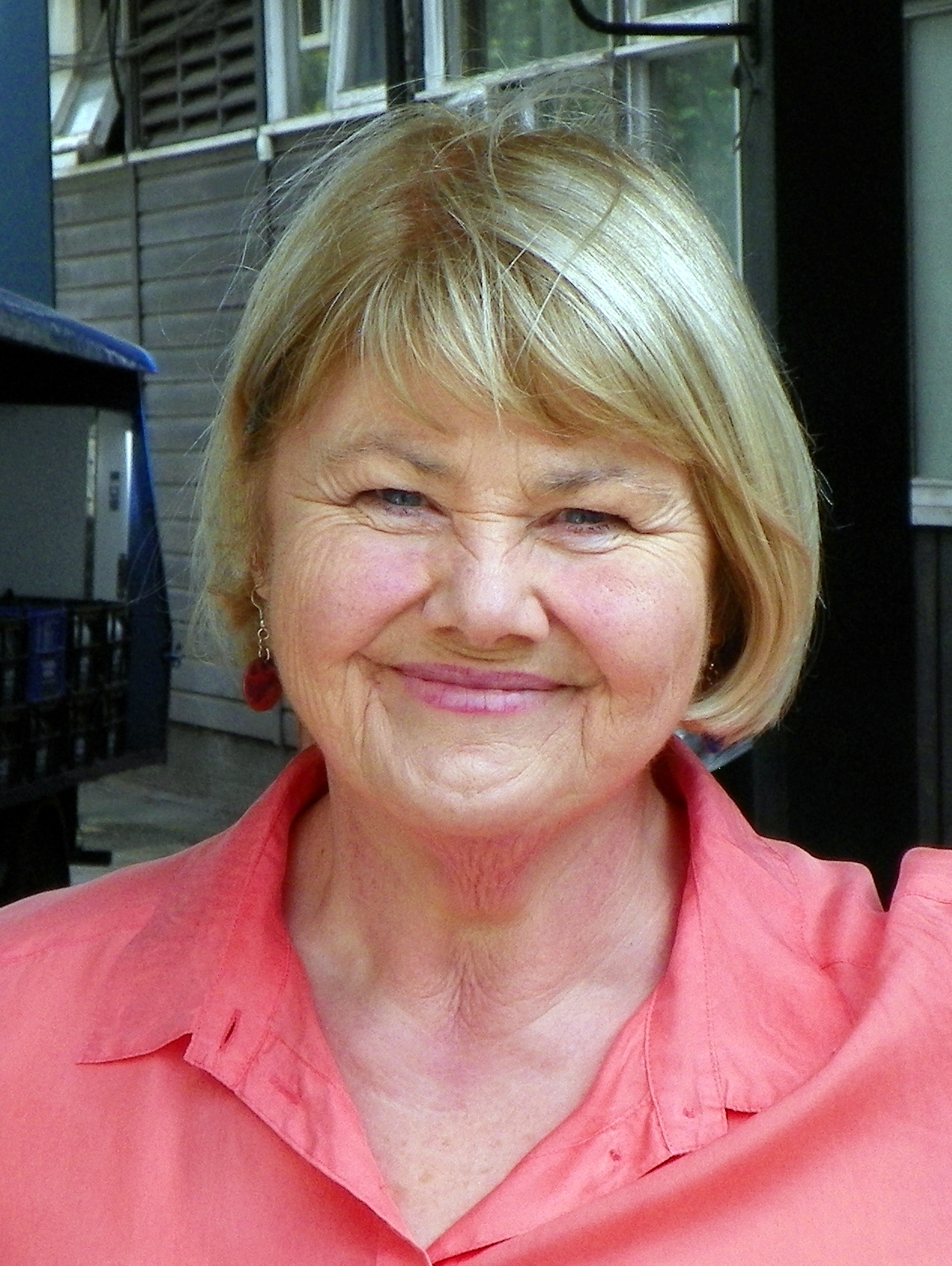
Annette Badland portrays Babe.

Babe was introduced as the maternal aunt of established characters Shirley (Linda Henry), Tina (Luisa Bradshaw-White), and Mick Carter (Danny Dyer), although Mick was later revealed to be Babe's great-nephew. The casting of Annette Badland was announced on 12 December 2013, when Badland commented, "I'm thrilled to be joining the cast of EastEnders as I've always admired the show and everyone involved in it seems so warm-hearted. Aunt Babe is a fabulous and complex woman and I can't wait to get stuck into the role."

Executive producer, Dominic Treadwell-Collins, introduced Babe as part of his plan to reinvigorate the show's older generation and teased Babe would "start to fill in some holes in the dark Carter family history." Treadwell-Collins later revealed that the billed personalities of Babe and Stan Carter (Timothy West) were actually swapped, with Babe actually being "manipulative". Laura Morgan of Digital Spy liked the swap in personalities, although found it surprising. She commented, "we've got to hand it to EastEnders for adopting this clever tactic."

Speaking of how she received the role, Badland recalled that she had previously worked with Treadwell-Collins on an independent film so she was requested for a "chat" with him, before they read through scenes from the show. She was subsequently offered the role of Babe, with Badland describing the process as "terrifying". When discussing plotlines for 2014, Treadwell-Collins said he wanted to see younger characters through the eyes of their parents and not the other way around and that was part of the reason behind Babe's introduction.

Badland was filming episodes for Wizards vs Aliens and Outlander during 2014 and so, Babe was slowly introduced to the show. She appeared in eleven episodes between February and July 2014, before eventually appearing permanently from 8 September 2014. Babe left the series again on 22 January 2015 when Mick exiled her from the family, but she since made various guest appearances until 5 May 2015. Radio Times then confirmed that Babe would return "later [that] year" and that the Carter family should "keep looking over their shoulders". Babe returned for the indefinite future on 3 September 2015, in a storyline which saw Shirley, Tina and Mick track her down to retrieve and scatter Stan's ashes, which she had previously stolen.

=== Characterisation ===
Busybody Babe is a good egg, a reliable and resilient lady who when the going gets tough, won't crack... Babe is the auntie you wish you had. Fun, big hearted, and a great cook. But underneath her bubbly exterior is a shrewd and intelligent woman who doesn't miss a trick – be warned, Aunt Babe knows everything! Babe will always feel guilty that she was away working in the Merchant Navy when Mick and Tina were taken into care and, like Shirley, she feels that she let them both down. After losing touch, Babe's very happy to be once again embroiled in the madness of the Carter clan! But is there more to this canny old bird? Scratch the surface and you'll find plenty of skeletons in Babe's closet...

— A reporter from the EastEnders website on Babe (2016)

Babe was billed as "a no-nonsense, bustling busybody with a big heart", who is also both shrewd and tough under her bubbly personality. Badland described Babe as "quite a private person" that would "protect her family", who she was "proud" to be in contact with again. She said she that Babe enjoys keeping "control in a social way" and that despite having a "front of being jolly", Babe could also get "very angry" and be "ruthless". She said that Babe is the kind of person who, when someone crosses her, just does and says the things that other people would not think of doing or saying until it is too late, and though she had tried to find trigger points that influence Babe's vengefulness, had realised that Babe was "wicked" just "for the joy of it". Rebecca Scroggs, who plays Tosh Mackintosh, described Babe as "a lovely woman" with a darker side that could make her the "most fearsome Carter of all". Badland also revealed that she never wanted Babe to be "modified into a more ordinary person" because she "relished" the character.

David Brown, writing for the Radio Times, called Babe "devious", a reporter from Inside Soap branded Babe "vindictive", and Adam Miller of The Daily Express described Babe as "twisted", "elusive" and "villainous". Additionally, Daniel Kilkelly from Digital Spy labelled Babe "spiteful", while Duncan Lindsay of the Metro said she was "scheming", a "deliciously wicked [...] villain", and "the villain we all love to hate". Claire Murphy of The Daily Mirror described Babe as "evil" and a "villain", and her colleague, Natalie Corner, named Babe "one of the most hated characters". Laura-Jayne Tyler of Inside Soap called Babe "wicked", while Sarah Deen of the Metro said that Babe is "that troublemaking, sinister little voice in people's ear that makes bad things happen" and branded her "Halloween personified". Johnathon Hughes of Digital Spy described Babe as a "sinister spinster" and "bitter". A Soaplife reporter labelled Babe as "ruthless", a "twisted witch" and a "devious little woman", while Morgan (Digital Spy) thought Babe is "rotten to the core" and not "a cuddly old dear".

=== Relationships ===
==== Carter family ====
Babe was introduced on-screen on 31 January 2014 when she visits the Carter family, having been called by Tina. She joins the family to assist them in preparation for their karaoke night at their pub, The Queen Victoria. More of the Carters' backstory was explored through Babe's introduction and at the end of episode, Babe was shown to have clear contact with her sister, Sylvie Carter (Linda Marlowe), despite telling the rest of the Carters otherwise. Babe was said to be "thrilled" to be back amongst her family, having felt "guilty" for how Sylvie left the family. Babe has a large amount of interaction with her family because she lives and works at the family's pub, The Queen Victoria. Babe is close with her niece Tina Carter, portrayed by Luisa Bradshaw-White, and Badland said that Babe has a "soft spot" for Tina and would always try to help her. Babe is wary of Tina's partner Tosh Mackintosh, portrayed by Rebecca Scroggs, so when Tina is attacked by Tosh, Babe becomes protective of Tina. Babe has a tense relationship with Tina's older sister Shirley Carter, portrayed by Linda Henry, as they share an emotional history. Badland believed Babe loves Shirley, but would protect herself over Shirley. Hughes (Digital Spy) described Babe as "the bad apple" of the Carter family.

Shirley and Tina's "brother" Mick Carter, portrayed by Danny Dyer, was revealed to the audience as Shirley's son. Badland explained that Babe and Shirley's mother, Sylvie Carter, portrayed by Linda Marlowe, knew this because they covered up Shirley's pregnancy and helped her give birth, which estranged Shirley from Babe. Babe threatens Shirley with her knowledge and promises to tell Mick if Shirley crosses her. Babe is unmarried and has no children so Shirley, Tina and Mick are the "closest thing she ever had" to children and her backstory states she was devastated when Tina and Mick were taken into care.

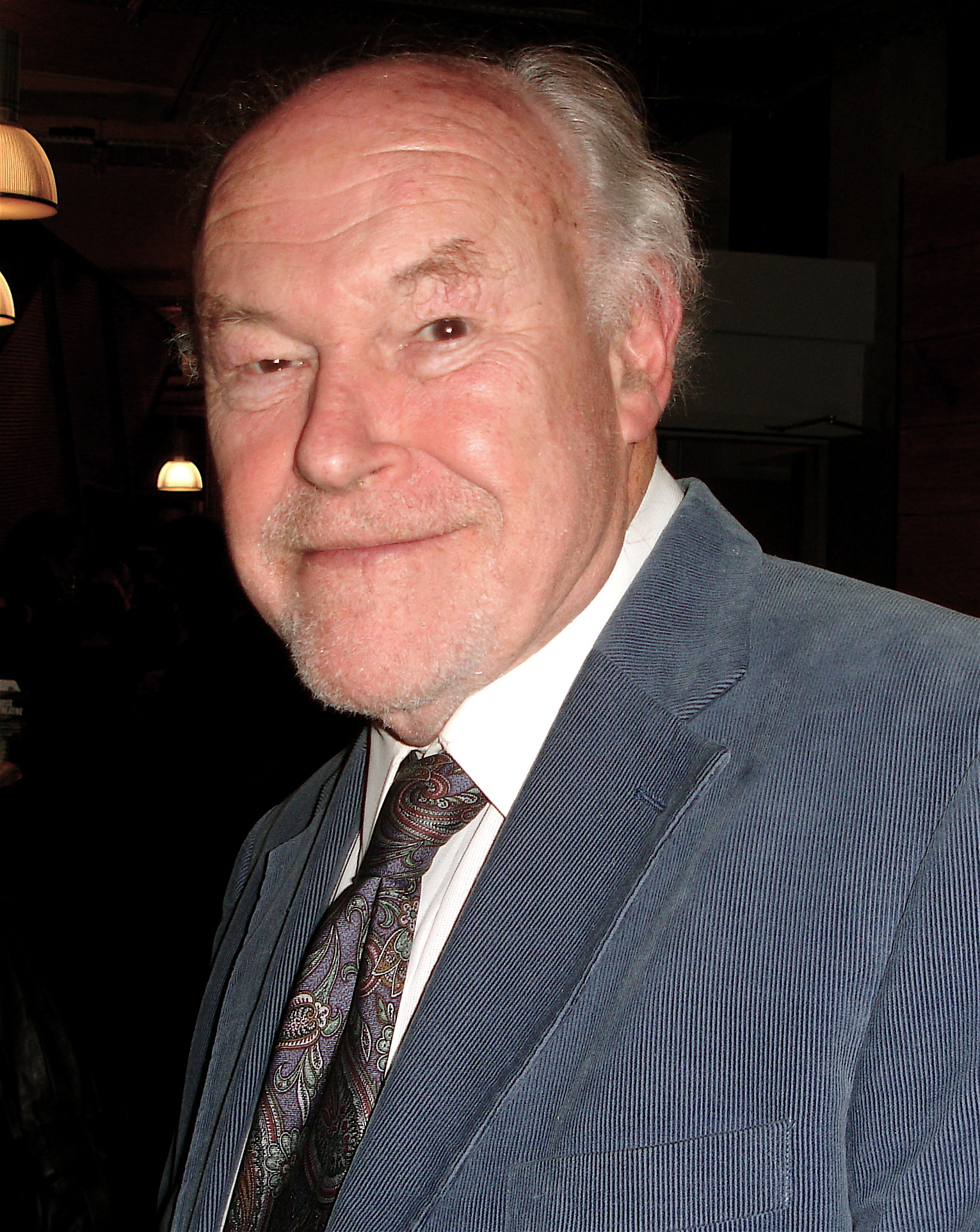
Babe had unreciprocated romantic feelings for her brother-in-law Stan Carter (played by Timothy West, pictured).

In her earlier episodes, producers set up a rivalry between Babe and her brother-in-law Stan Carter, portrayed by Timothy West. The reason for their shared hatred was not explained until Sylvie arrived, when it was revealed that Babe was in love with Stan and believed Sylvie stole Stan when they were younger. Vicky Prior of the Metro described that there is "no love lost" between Babe and Stan, and speculated that Babe and Stan may have had an affair. Katy Brent-Stacey of the Daily Mirror said Babe's life was "wasted" because she spent it "hoping that Stan would notice her". Miller (Daily Express) described Babe as being "madly in love" with Stan. All About Soap said that "all those years of unrequited love [...] made Babe pretty bitter". When Stan is diagnosed with terminal prostate cancer, Babe is devastated at the prospect of losing him. Stan becomes engaged to Cora Cross (Ann Mitchell) and when his health deteriorates, they decide to marry quickly. Babe attempts to ruin it by bringing Sylvie to see Stan, but they decide to marry nevertheless. Babe is delighted when Stan is physically unable to say his vows, but is devastated when he dies. Gary Gillatt of Inside Soap expressed his approval of Babe's rivalry with Cora and said, "there's a hot new rivalry in Walford – and we can't get enough if it!"

Babe dislikes Shirley's son Dean Wicks, portrayed by Matt Di Angelo, and Badland explained that Babe thinks Dean is "hot headed" and a "slippery fish". Babe falls out with Mick's son Johnny Carter (Ted Reilly) when he tries to stop her plans for a night at The Queen Vic, sparking tension between them. Badland revealed that off-screen she gets along well with the actors playing her on-screen family, describing them as "generous, kind and fun".

==== Sylvie Carter ====
Following Babe's arrival, it was speculated that she could be in contact with her sister, Sylvie (Marlowe). In her first episode, Babe was shown to be frequently in contact with her, despite telling Shirley she had not spoken to her. In a later episode, Babe claims to the Carter family that she lives alone and feels "lonely" without Sylvie, having not been in contact with her. Babe also claims that she misses having someone "to share half a beer with at the end of a long day." However, later scenes in the episodes depict Babe talking to an unknown person off-screen as she opens a bottle of beer for them to share.

On 1 August 2014, it was announced that Sylvie would be introduced to the show, but no character details or casting news were announced. Marlowe's casting was announced on 23 September 2014 and Treadwell-Collins promised that Sylvie's appearance would "open old wounds in the Carter family". He added that "watching Linda Marlowe, Annette Badland, Ann Mitchell and Timothy West going for it on screen is going to be electric." Marlowe explained that Babe had hidden Sylvie away because of her Alzheimer's disease and the behaviour that accompanies the illness. She noted that Babe and Sylvie were close because they were fond of each other, but opined that Sylvie is "a little bit intimidated" by Babe because she can be "very scary" and "a bit conniving". Hughes (Digital Spy) disapproved of Babe's treatment of Sylvie and noted that Babe struggled to overcome Stan choosing Sylvie instead of her, making her "a woman with issues."

==== Abi Branning ====
"Poor Abi just wanted some words of comfort and a confidence boost when she confided in Babe about her Ben blues. The next minute, she's inventing a pregnancy, having a special "Mitchell on board" t-shirt made up, and even seducing a random guy to cover her tracks. We know Abi's had her moments, but we bet she'd never have dreamt up half of this stuff if it wasn't for Babe's bizarre influence."

— Daniel Kilkelly of entertainment website Digital Spy on Babe's influence on Abi. (2016)

Producers created a friendship between Babe and Abi Branning (Lorna Fitzgerald) and used Babe to manipulate Abi. Fitzgerald believed that Abi was "easily manipulated by characters who are stronger than her" because she was "very vulnerable". Sophie Dainty, writing for Digital Spy, branded Babe "an unlikely ally" for Abi. Lindsay (Metro) described Babe and Abi as a "villanious double act" which was "genius" and "the most bonkers and outrageous double acts of all time in soap". Abi wants a family unit for her and her boyfriend, Ben Mitchell (Harry Reid), despite Ben being a closeted homosexual and hopes to get pregnant by Ben, but he stuns her by revealing he has contracted an STI. Babe comforts Abi and Fitzgerald explained, "Abi thinks Babe is looking out for her, and she trusts her". Tyler (Inside Soap) praised Babe's involvement in Abi's fake pregnancy, writing, "We're beyond thrilled that Aunt Babe is back to her wicked best – leading Abi into disaster just because Babe herself was once ditched by her true love Stan." She added that she "especially enjoyed Babe's assumption that Abi is a lesbian, and that she and Ben are each other's 'beards'" and thought the scene was funny.

Babe encourages Abi to tell Ben she is pregnant. Fitzgerald explained that when Babe suggests the idea, Abi decides to trust her. Lindsay believed the moment Abi tells Ben she is pregnant had "Babe written all over it", adding that "as a puppet of Aunt Babe's, there isn't much hope for Abi". Digital Spy named the moment "the bombshell of all bombshells". Viewers speculated that Abi had lied about the pregnancy and the Sunday Express questioned whether Babe had "put the idea in Abi's head". The speculation was confirmed in the following episode. Lindsay believed that in the weeks following the scene, viewers would "laugh at Babe and Abi, cry for them, feel for them, root for them and scream furiously at them while throwing plates at [their] televisions." Fitzgerald enjoyed Babe and Abi's friendship and said she "loved" working with Badland, while Badland also liked working with Fitzgerald, saying that she thought Babe and Abi had "genuinely connected" but their friendship was "inevitably soured with all the shenanigans". Lindsay praised the show for "recognising the qualities this insane partnership has" and suggested the portmanteau "Babi" for their pairing. In addition to his comments, Lindsay ran a poll asking readers for their opinions on Babe and Abi's friendship: 54% of people who answered described it as "fantastic", while the other 46% described it as "terrible".

Abi attempts to impregnant herself by having a one-night stand with Babe's relative, Lee Carter (Danny-Boy Hatchard), following encouragement from Babe to have a one-night stand. Badland explained that Babe regrets encouraging Abi, saying "She got a bit over-enthusiastic and she gave her bad advice. Babe saw herself in Abi and she really wanted to help her." Abi's attempt at getting pregnant is unsuccessful so when Abi suffers a fall in The Vic, Babe persuades Abi to fake a miscarriage. This leaves Ben "crushed" when he learns of Abi's miscarriage. This plot twist was criticised by Zoe Clark-Coates, co-founder and CEO of The Mariposa Trust, who said, "To regularly see TV shows using fake miscarriages as light entertainment could make people question genuine losses."

On 29 March 2016, Kilkelly (Digital Spy) reported that Babe and Abi would have a disagreement, causing Babe would post a letter addressed to Ben detailing Abi's lies. Babe regrets her decision and informs Abi, but before she can retrieve the letter, Ben's younger sister, Louise Mitchell (Tilly Keeper), intercepts it and blackmails Abi. Abi, believing that Louise has told Ben the truth, tries to explain her actions to him and he consequently realises the truth. Deen (Metro) opined that Abi created "a deal with the devil" when she asked for help from Babe. She noted that while it "all blew up in Abi's face", Babe "stood back and watched the fireworks." Dainty noted that the baby storyline concluded with "a somewhat dramatic end".

Babe threatens Abi and burns her as a way of keeping her in the clear. Deen included the scene where Babe deliberately burns Abi in her list of "12 times soaps were scarier than any horror movie". She described the moment as "chilling", writing, "The fact that the grim moment isn't seen (you just hear Abi's anguished scream) makes it even more terrifying." In a separate article, Deen also praised the scene where Babe forced her way into Abi's house and said, "the way she says 'watch your back' makes our blood run cold." In 2017, Lindsay opined that Babe should receive her comeuppance and that Abi "needs to be instrumental" in this.

When Whitney Dean (Shona McGarty), Lee's fiancée, contracts chlamydia, Babe reveals that he had sex with Abi, who had contracted an STI from Ben. On Babe's reasons for revealing the secret, Badland explained, "She's not sure where she stands, but she's desperate to get back inside the family. She loves Mick so much she wants to be around him. Linda and Mick have hurt her and you mustn't do that... Babe can get very upset!" Abi consequently reveals that Babe encouraged her to have a one-night stand, which causes Mick and Linda to reject Babe. However, after she is attacked, Mick and Linda try to fix their relationship with Babe. Of Mick and Linda making amends with Babe, Badland explained, "Although it might appear on the surface the Carters have forgiven her for playing a part in Abi's fake pregnancy lie and encouraging her to sleep with Lee, there could be repercussions further down the line."

==== Other relationships ====
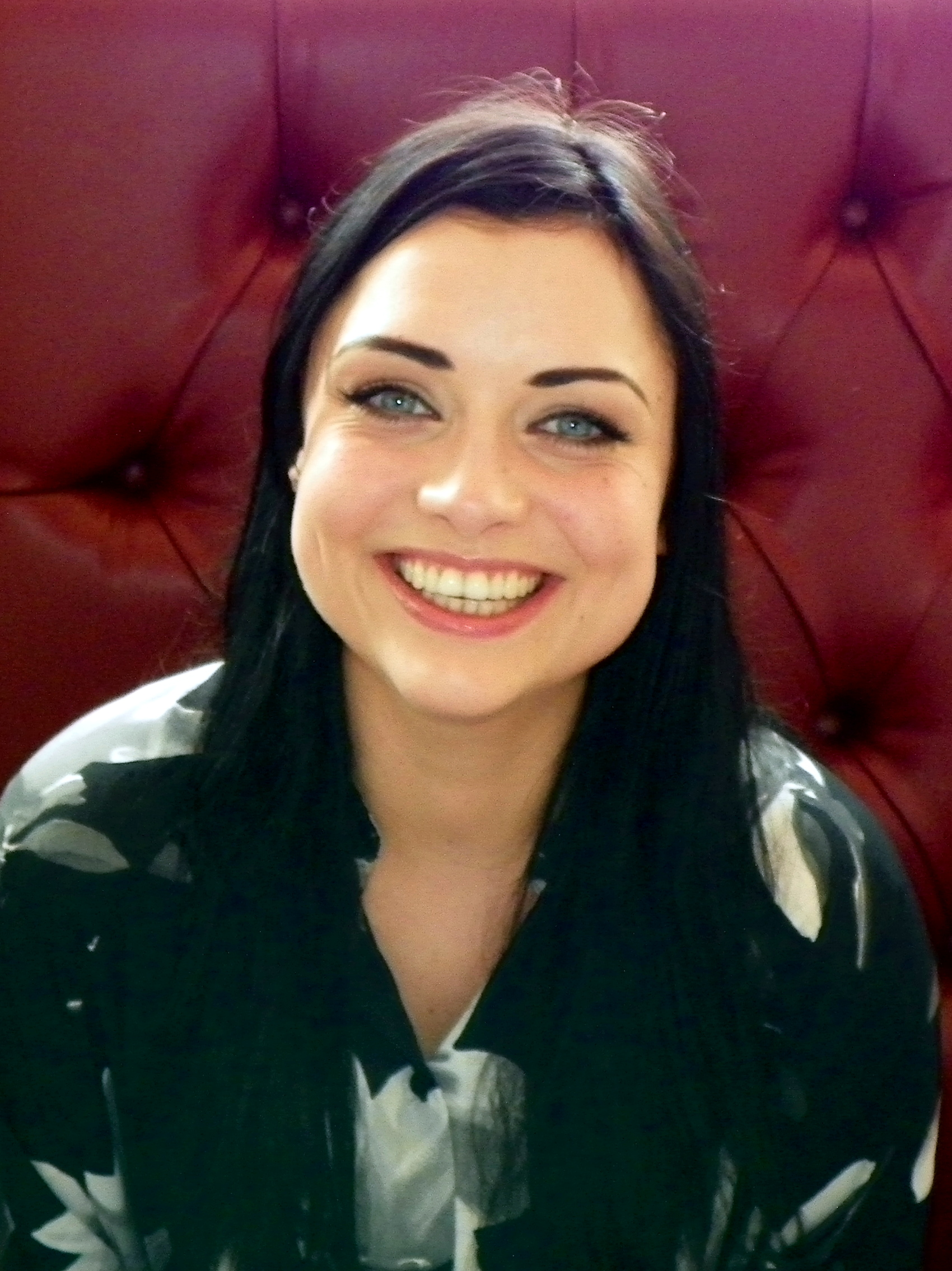
Babe frequently clashes with Whitney Carter, portrayed by Shona McGarty (pictured).

The show reintroduced Mick's mother-in-law Elaine Peacock (Maria Friedman) in October 2015 and introduced her "toy-boy lover" Jason Adams (portrayed by Scott Neal). It was reported on 29 September 2015 that Babe and Jason would be caught in a "state of undress" by Mick and Linda. Deen (Metro) did not enjoy Babe's fling with Jason, describing it as "a grim passionate clinch" and hoping that it was not referenced again.

Babe frequently clashes with Whitney Carter (McGarty). Whitney correctly believes Babe has concocted Abi's pregnancy and confronts her, but Babe threatens to reveal her kiss with Mick so Whitney backs down. McGarty enjoyed the rivalry between Babe and Whitney, adding that it is "so much fun to deliver all the sly little comments that [Whitney] gives to Babe." The actress praised Badland, branding her "scary" in character and said she was "a bit frightened" of her. Babe and Whitney clash again when Babe blames her for the Carter family's financial problems and tells her that she has "ruined" Lee's life. Babe is left annoyed when Whitney fights back against Babe. Kilkelly (Digital Spy) questioned whether Babe has "finally met her match" when she battles Whitney. Lindsay (Metro) praised the scene in which Babe blames Whitney for the family's financial problems and said, "we just love it when scheming Aunt Babe gets put in her place".

On-screen, Babe announced her plans to serve breakfast at The Queen Vic and it was reported that she would spark "stiff" competition from Kathy Beale (Gillian Taylforth), who runs the local café, when she launches her breakfast menu. Badland expressed an interest in filming with Steve McFadden (who plays Phil Mitchell) and suggested that Babe could become a mechanic, working for Phil. Speaking to Sarah Ellis of Inside Soap, Badland said, "I think she fixes her own car, you see, so I reckon she'd get her boiler suit on and go to work with Phil..." Badland believed Babe would "find [a] relationship incredibly difficult because she has known nothing but struggle and rejection all of her life."

=== Baby farming ===
Producers established a new secret from Babe's backstory in April 2015. When Babe slaps Sylvie, she threatens to report Babe to the police for her past with Queenie Trott (Judy Cornwell) but Babe reminds Sylvie she was involved as well. The storyline was revisted following Badland's return to the series in September 2015. Reports emerged of Badland, Dyer, Henry and Bradshaw-White filming Babe's return in Broadstairs and Ramsgate in June 2015. When Babe mentions to Shirley, Mick and Tina that Queenie helped her keep their family together, Shirley remembers something and returns to Babe's caravan. At the caravan, Shirley exposes Babe's secret and reveals that Babe and Queenie stole the babies of young women to sell. Dyer described the secret as "a huge revelation" and "a shock and very dark". Babe explains to her family that she and Queenie ran an illegal adoption service, selling babies that could not be terminated. To "move on" from Stan's death, Babe sets fire to her caravan so Mick invites her to live with him and his family in The Vic.

Babe's baby farming secret was met with shock and disgust by viewers on Twitter. All About Soap said that Babe's illegal baby-selling business run from a "grubby caravan in Ramsgate is pretty murky". Deen (Metro) said the storyline was "one of [Babe's] darkest storylines" and praised the scenes where Babe set her caravan alight, writing, "Like all good soap villains, Babe hit the self-destruct button in spectacular fashion, making her family believe (briefly) that she had perished inside the caravan fire." Comparing the baby farming storyline and Abi's fake pregnancy, Brown (Radio Times) questioned Babe's "baby-obsessed" nature, writing, "what is it with her keen interest in other people's newborns?".

=== Blackmail and feud with Claudette Hubbard ===
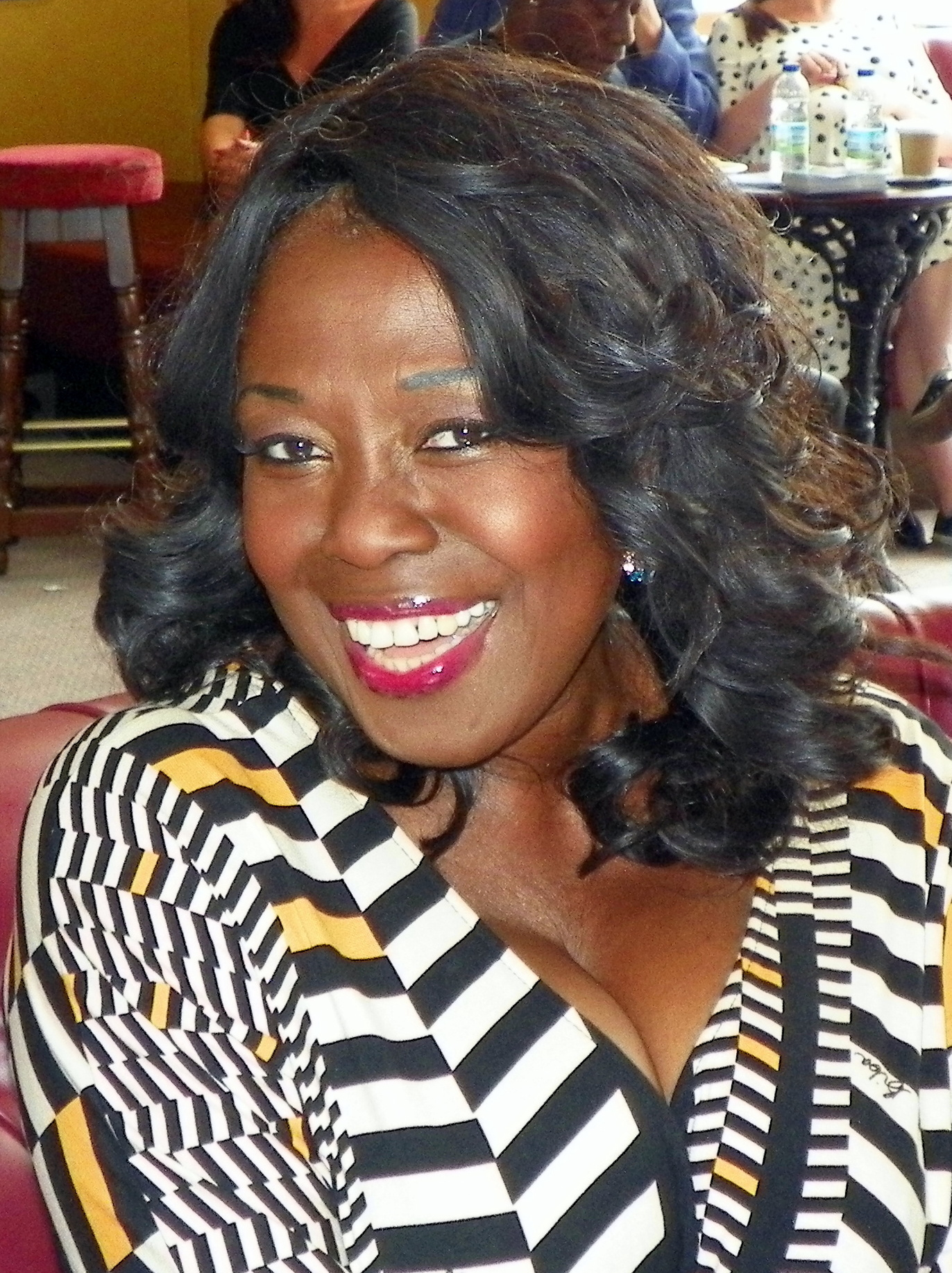
Babe clashed with Claudette Hubbard (played by Ellen Thomas, pictured) over her blackmail of Les Coker.

Producers created a new storyline in October 2015 when Les Coker (Roger Sloman) was revealed to the audience as a crossdresser, going by the name of Christine. Les's wife, Pam Coker (Lin Blakley), struggles with this and ends their marriage. In one of several attempts to win Pam back, Les burns all of Christine's belongings. Babe witnesses this and steals a half-burnt photograph of Christine. Badland said that Babe is "quite Dickensian in the way that she finds things and slips them into her pocket to use against people!" The storyline was revisited in May 2016 when Babe begins anonymously blackmailing Les and Pam in exchange for her silence. Of Babe's motivation to blackmail the Cokers, Badland said that "Babe hasn't got any respect for Pam and Les and she's using them to get money. It's as simple as that really." She also said that she "resents seeing [Les] and Pam together as a unit" after he rejects her romantic advances, because she has "never had what they have".

When Les threatens to inform the police about her blackmail, Babe increases the price of the blackmail so Pam tries to appeal to Babe's "better nature". A reporter from Soaplife believed that this would "get Pam absolutely nowhere" because Babe does not have a better side. Pam is unable to appeal to her better nature and a show insider explained that Pam "doesn't see that she has any other option but to pay up". Billy Mitchell (Perry Fenwick) discovers Les's secret, which made Kilkelly (Digital Spy) believe that "it's only a matter of time before more characters find out." He opined that it would "be refreshing to see Babe receive the backlash for putting the Cokers through months of misery". He also described Babe as a "vicious blackmailler" who should be "ashamed".

Following the death of their grandson, Les and Pam confess their blackmail secret to their friend, Claudette Hubbard (Ellen Thomas), who warns Babe to end the blackmail. However, despite Claudette's warnings, Babe continues to blackmail the Cokers. This sparks tension between Babe and Claudette, who tells Babe that she will be moving back to the square to keep a "closer eye" on her. Badland explained Babe's rivalry with Claudette: "Claudette's sticking up for Les and Pam. She's a fair match for Babe and it's interesting when they go head-to-head." Badland hoped that the feud would last a long time, opining that it was "fabulous", and that "neither [woman] will back down easily", and adding that she thought Babe would triumph over Claudette, though admitted she was biased and probably "the only person on Babe's side". An Inside Soap reporter said Babe and Claudette's feud was "exciting" because Claudette is "fearsome" and Babe is "equally terrifying", and suspected that "Cunning Babe [would not] be so easily intimidated". A reporter for All About Soap questioned if Babe had "finally met her match" in Claudette, and compared the two women. In terms of cunning, they said that Babe has it "by the bucketload", while Claudette may be "getting soft in her old age" and may not be "sharp enough to take on Babe". They also opined that Claudette had more "fighting strength" as she continues to come back after a "knock down" and would not go down without a fight, while Babe's craftiness "means she'd easily come up with a new way to destroy an enemy". They said that Claudette has a "nasty and murderous" history while Babe's past is "chequered" but she had never killed someone, concluding that Claudette would be the winner of the feud, but still saying that they "wouldn't mess with Babe!".

The storyline concludes in episodes broadcast in October 2016 when the Cokers leave Walford. At the conclusion of the blackmail storyline, Sarah Robertson of the Metro said that Babe was "on her way to becoming soap's most hated character".

=== Revenge attack ===
A new storyline began in August 2016 when Babe became the victim of a revenge attack, having accumulated several enemies over the months leading up to the attack. Several media outlets suggested a range of suspects, with the most prominent suspects being Claudette, Les and Pam, Abi and Sylvie. Other suspects included: Linda, Lee, Whitney, Ben Mitchell (Harry Reid), Steven Beale (Aaron Sidwell) and Lauren Branning (Jacqueline Jossa). The episode that aired in the United Kingdom on 15 August 2016 saw Babe argue with Claudette, Les, Abi and Sylvie with each suspect later seen going out, before someone confronts Babe in the Vic, locking her in the freezer. The scene where Babe is locked in the freezer received the episode's "duff-duff". Episodes following the attack showed Babe tell her family that Sylvie was responsible for the attack, but have a conversation with Abi revealing her as the true culprit. Badland said that the attack "takes Babe by surprise" as "she clearly didn't know there was somebody out there capable of doing this to her or else she'd have seen it coming." She opined that "Babe doesn't think for a minute that Abi could ever get the better of her."

=== Departure ===
On 18 September 2016, it was announced that Babe would be written out of the series in 2017, having appeared on the show for three years. A show spokesperson recalled that before moving to Walford, Babe was "seen coming and going from The Square with her own life" and stated that she would "still very much be in the wings" and could "cause aggro for the Carters." Ian Sandwell of Digital Spy hoped that Babe's exit storyline would see her receive her just deserts as punishment for her "despicable schemes", but believed that she would "get away without getting a proper comeuppance." The Metro ran a poll on their website to ask readers for their opinions on whether they would miss the character when she left the show: 71% of people who answered said they would not miss her because she is "awful", while the other 29% said they would miss her and agreed that "she brought brilliant drama" to the show.

"Babe tries to help but she always goes that step too far and her methods aren't always the most legitimate! She's trying very hard to help Mick – her family is so important to her; she wants to be their mother but she feels she is on the outside. She's never been loved by anyone for all of her life. She's constantly the outsider. She feels that she is their mother, but she has always remained on the peripheral."

— Annette Badland on Babe's reasoning for breaching The Vic's licensing laws. (2017)

When the Carter family begin to struggle financially, Babe decides to help by selling alcohol before the allocated hours, despite it breaching The Vic's licensing laws. Badland explained that Babe "deals with things in the way that she knows how but it doesn't always work out the way that she wants it to". Badland described Babe's actions as "instinctive", which makes her "often [act] on impulse". She questioned whether Babe could be "an optimist and doesn't fully consider the damage she can cause." Kathy decides to tip the authorities and after a series of undercover investigations, the police arrest Babe, Mick and Shirley. In her interview, Babe blames Mick and tells the police she was "only acting on instructions". Despite this, they all spend the night in police custody. Badland revealed that Babe "was assuming she could find a way out of it" when blaming Mick because "it's about staying alive in that moment." She explained that Babe's actions stem from a fear of being arrested and said, "For all she has ever been up to, she has never been in a prison cell so it was about her staying afloat in that precise moment." Badland believed that Babe would be able to "talk her way out of trouble with the Carters" again and explained that "the family have a lot to talk about – and a lot to find out about..."

Babe made her final appearance on 9 February 2017. In the episode, Babe tries to make amends with her family by taking care of Sylvie, but instead takes her to the canal and tells her that Stan is on the other side, before leaving her alone. Badland explained that Babe "would not have actually killed" Sylvie, but instead "enticed her to do something and then walked away from it". When Shirley discovers Babe's actions, she tells her to leave so Babe tries to steal money from the pub's safe. Shirley catches her in the act and announces her actions to Mick. Babe pleads with Mick for another chance, but when she calls Linda a "stuck-up cow", Mick escorts her out. Badland explained that Babe does this because she is "absolutely desperate". Outside the pub, Babe curses the family and exclaimed, "I hope you lose everything and your precious pub", which caused media outlets to question whether it foreshadows speculation the family would lose their pub. Badland believed that "with all the threats she made, Babe might be back at some point." She added that, "She's cursed the Carters, and you don't cross Aunt Babe and get away with it!"

Daran Little wrote Babe's final episode and Badland said he "really relished and summed up what [Babe] was about." She added that she was "so grateful" for the storyline and described her departure episode as "complex, moving, wretched". She described Babe as "vengeful", "powerful" and "a bit of a witch". Badland expressed an interest in reprising the role and said a potential return had been allowed for, before adding that she believes Babe will return. Badland said she would continue to watch the show as her on-screen family "are all part of [her] now" and she "will always be their auntie." She described the Carter family as the highlight during her time on the show. She added, "We all came together and formed this brilliant family which is pretty astounding – we are all very different but that bond that brought us all together was extraordinary."

== Storylines ==
Babe Smith arrives in Walford after being invited to The Queen Victoria public house by Tina Carter (Luisa Bradshaw-White). Babe tells Shirley Carter (Linda Henry) that she would like to spend more time with her and has not made contact with her sister, Shirley and Tina's mother, Sylvie Carter (Linda Marlowe), in months. However, she has missed three calls from her. Babe returns to visit the Carters and reveals that when the children were young, she sold marijuana to help out financially. She later provides Tina with marijuana to sell and she cooks it in brownies, which are stolen. When Mick and Shirley discover this, Shirley burns Babe's stash, so Babe threatens to reveal that Shirley is Mick's mother. After being introduced to Tina's girlfriend, Fiona "Tosh" Mackintosh (Rebecca Scroggs), Babe warns Tosh not to harm Tina. It becomes apparent Sylvie lives with Babe, and Sylvie's former husband, Stan Carter (Timothy West), becomes suspicious when he sees Babe buying lilies, Sylvie's favourite flower.

After Shirley separates from her flame, Phil Mitchell (Steve McFadden), Babe becomes her confidant and suggests that she take revenge. Shirley shoots Phil and flees Walford with Babe's help, although Babe lies to the Carters and tells them she has not seen Shirley. Babe discovers that Stan has terminal prostate cancer and urges him to inform their family, but he refuses so Babe tells them, annoying Stan. Babe leads Tosh to believe Tina is having an affair with Sonia Fowler (Natalie Cassidy), which causes Tosh to attack Tina. When Shirley and Mick visit Babe, intending to confront her, they find Sylvie, who has Alzheimer's disease. Following this, Mick discovers the truth about his parentage, while Shirley and Stan reconcile, upsetting Babe, who admits she had loved Stan herself and always resented Sylvie for "stealing" him. Babe later decides she cannot care for Sylvie alone, and persuades the family to put Sylvie into a care home. However, at a goodbye party, Sylvie and Shirley have an angry confrontation, causing Shirley to reveal that it was Babe who suggested the idea to pass Mick off as Sylvie's child. Mick is furious and tells Sylvie and Babe to leave.

Babe returns to The Queen Vic, but is rejected by Mick's wife Linda Carter (Kellie Bright) and leaves. When Stan loses the use of his legs due to his prostate cancer, Tina asks Babe to visit so she can persuade him to seek medical help. Stan is pleased to see Babe and reconciles with Tina. Although Babe is upset when Stan proposes to Cora Cross (Ann Mitchell), she encourages Cora to accept the proposal as Stan will never love her. After Stan's death, Babe excludes Cora from his funeral and encourages the rift between Mick and Shirley. After the funeral, Babe tells Sylvie, who is residing in a care home, that Stan has died, which frustrates Sylvie as she could not attend the funeral. Babe and Sylvie argue and exchange insults, leading to Babe slapping Sylvie. Sylvie then bites Babe's shoulder and threatens to report a criminal act that Babe and Queenie Trott (Judy Cornwell) committed several years earlier. Babe continues to create a rift between the Carter family and pays a teenager to throw a brick through the window of Shirley's son Dean Wicks's (Matt Di Angelo) salon. However, Dean's father, Buster Briggs (Karl Howman), learns the truth behind the attack and confronts Babe in front of the Carters, tipping a trifle over her head. After realising Babe's deceit, Mick and Shirley force Babe to leave Walford, but Babe warns that she will return.

A few months later, Mick and Tina go to Babe's house to confront her, as Stan's ashes have been replaced by custard powder, only to be greeted by a man who says that Babe has moved to Ramsgate. Along with Shirley, they track Babe down to a caravan in Ramsgate, where Babe states she was evicted from her house. Later, Shirley discovers a scrapbook of photos of young pregnant girls with due dates written on the back and realises that Babe and Queenie had kidnapped these girls and had their babies adopted out. Shirley is disgusted by Babe's actions and threatens to set her fire to her caravan, but Mick stops her. However, Babe burns the caravan down herself, realising that she needs to move on, and returns to Walford with Shirley, Mick and Tina. Linda's mother, Elaine Peacock (Maria Friedman), and her toyboy fiancé, Jason Adams (Scott Neal), temporarily move into The Queen Vic. Babe does not trust Jason, although they have a passionate encounter, which is caught by Mick and Linda. Linda asks Babe to ensure Jason leaves Walford without informing Elaine of the reason, but when Elaine teases Babe, she reveals that she had sex with Jason. Elaine refuses to believe this, while Jason suggests that he and Babe steal from the pub and leave together. Babe secretly records the conversation and plays it to the Carters, who force Jason to leave. Babe admits to Elaine and Linda that she and Jason did not have sex and that she feels lonely. Babe continues to clash with Cora and is humiliated when Cora exposes her baby farming past to the Carter family and the pub's customers. Linda contemplates evicting Babe, but after Babe successfully leads a protest to house Cora, Linda allows Babe to stay.

Babe hires Abi Branning (Lorna Fitzgerald) to work as her kitchen assistant after Abi confides in Babe about her jealousy towards her sister, Lauren Branning (Jacqueline Jossa), which she felt she could relate to. Babe notices Abi's boyfriend, Ben Mitchell (Harry Reid), flirting with Paul Coker (Jonny Labey), so helps Abi to take revenge. Abi later reveals to a busy pub, including Ben and Paul, that she is pregnant, however it transpires Babe encouraged Abi to fake her pregnancy until she becomes pregnant. However, Ben suspects he has caught an STI from having casual sex, so Babe suggests that Abi has sex with a stranger and she has sex with Babe's relative, Lee Carter (Danny-Boy Hatchard), but does not become pregnant. Babe later discovers that Les Coker (Roger Sloman) is a crossdresser. During an argument between Ben and his father, Phil Mitchell (Steve McFadden), Babe pushes Abi into Ben and she falls so Babe rushes her out of The Queen Vic, claiming to be taking her to the hospital. When they return, Abi tells her friends and family that she has miscarried. After Abi and Babe fall out, Babe writes a letter to Ben explaining the truth, and although it is intercepted by Ben's half-sister, Louise Mitchell (Tilly Keeper), Abi still inadvertently reveals the truth to Ben, ending their relationship.

The following month, Babe begins blackmailing Les anonymously. Les' wife, Pam Coker (Lin Blakley), realises Babe is the blackmailer, but is too ashamed to report it so Babe continues to increase the blackmail amount. Babe later threatens to reveal photos of Les crossdressing, causing Pam to humiliate herself while the stress of the blackmail causes Les to suffer a heart attack. When Babe discovers that Abi and Lee had sex and that Abi has passed on an STI to Lee's pregnant girlfriend, Whitney Dean (Shona McGarty), Babe badly burns Abi's hand. After the fling is exposed, Abi informs the Carter family about Babe's involvement and the family subsequently disown her. At a low ebb, Babe begins blackmailing the Cokers again, despite the recent death of their grandson, Paul, as well as threatening Abi. Pam eventually confides in Claudette Hubbard (Ellen Thomas) about the blackmail and she threatens Babe to stop it.

Babe is invited to return to work by Linda and is pleased when Abi is sacked after making an error. Babe visits Sylvie, who now lives with Tina, and belittles her. Later in the evening, Babe is locked in The Queen Vic's kitchen freezer by an unknown assailant, although Linda and Whitney discover Babe and she makes a quick recovery. Linda accuses Claudette of being the culprit so Claudette exposes Babe's blackmailer secret to her. Mick and Linda are mortified, but forgive Babe. She later informs her family that Sylvie locked her in the freezer, but it transpires that Abi is the culprit and Babe realises this, but wants to readmit Sylvie into a care home. Linda later demands Babe return the money to the Cokers to avoid police interference, but Babe neglects the task so Mick warns her. She tries to earn the money by gambling and blackmailing Abi, but she mocks Babe's desperation. Linda issues Babe with a final warning so Babe decides to go to the bank, however she is delayed by Lee. Linda grows tired and evicts Babe, despite her returning all of the money. They later have a heart-to-heart where Babe explains that the money was placed into a bank account for Linda's infant son, Ollie Carter (Charlie) and says how she is cruel because it makes her feel better. Linda subsequently allows Babe to move back into the Vic.

Babe starts serving breakfasts in the pub, putting her in direct competition with the local café, which starts a feud with its owner, Kathy Beale (Gillian Taylforth). Babe tries to sabotage Kathy's business by poisoning her coffee machine, disgusting the Carter family. Babe creates a scheme to illegally serve alcohol with breakfast and unwittingly serves beer to a police detective who is working undercover. Days later, Babe, Mick and Shirley are arrested for breaching the licence laws, but Babe lies to the police that it was Mick's plan that she was following. Mick, Shirley and Babe are ordered to pay a fine. When Sylvie belittles Babe after telling her that she is the reason why Stan didn't love her, she leaves Sylvie by the canal in the rain, although Sylvie is found and Shirley realises that Babe left Sylvie to die and orders her to leave. When Shirley finds Babe stealing from The Queen Vic's takings, she physically throws her out and explains this to Mick. Babe pleads with him to let her stay, but Mick rejects her so she insults Linda. Mick ejects Babe from The Queen Vic, warning her to never come back again. Standing in the rain, an angry Babe curses the Carter family, stating she hopes they lose The Queen Vic and everything else they love, before then leaving the Square for good.

== Reception ==
"EastEnders have definitely created a monster with Babe Smith. Annette Badland's Babe, aunt to Shirley and Tina Carter, has been terrorising the Square since 2014. The soft-voiced cook with a terrifying mean streak could easily be the star of a horror film, and that's what makes her a classic soap villain. With some of the stunts she's pulled in order to 'make herself feel better' as she puts it, Babe is a better friend than an enemy. And even then... you can't really be sure that she actually is your friend."

— Critic Sarah Deen on Babe (2016)

Badland received two award nominations for her portrayal of Babe, both Inside Soap Awards for "Best Bad Girl" in 2015 and 2016 respectively. For her 2015 nomination, she was longlisted but did not make the viewer-voted shortlist. She made the shortlist in 2016, but lost out on the award to Hollyoaks' Persephone Swales-Dawson, who played Nico Blake.

Laura Morgan of Digital Spy praised Babe's introduction, writing that her addition "worked beautifully". Sally Brockway, writing for magazine Soaplife, wrote, "She may rustle up a mean trifle, but you'll pay the price if you get on the wrong side of Aunt Babe Smith." Ellis (Inside Soap) said, "Of all the villains in Walford, we never would have thought that a trifle-making, Reliant-Rialto-driving, apron-wearing aunt would turn out to be the most fearsome! She may not have the brute force of Phil Mitchell or the steely determination of Gavin Sullivan, but Babe is not someone we'd ever want to do battle with." A reporter from Soaplife noted that "[it is] Babe's own desperation that makes her the monster of the woman she is..."

On Babe's evil streak, Morgan (Digital Spy) said that Babe was "about as bad as they get". She observed that Babe began by "fooling people her smiles and tasty looking trifles", but her family soon realised "her wicked ways". In June 2016, Dainty (Digital Spy) included Babe in a list of soap opera villains she hoped would get their comeuppance, stating, "Cold, callous and cruel Aunt Babe is fast emerging as one of Walford's most unexpected villains, but we think it's time she got her just deserts. [...] Babe has got away with many a manipulative scheme over the years, but her treatment of lovely Les and Pam is just one step too far. Because we are very much Team Coker over here, we'd like to see Aunt Babe brought down a peg or two. And soon."

Badland explained in an interview with Lindsay (Metro) that some fans of the character have cried at her actions and sympathise with her. Members of the Digital Spy forums labelled Babe the show's current (June 2016) most hated character, adding that Babe was "compelling to watch" and an "evil character that people will remember in years to come". One member also praised Badland's "spot on" performance. In a 2017 storyline, Babe hosted a 'Twelfth Night' event at The Vic where she secretly served pigeon pie. Justin Harp of Digital Spy expressed his disgust at this and demanded a "lifelong Queen Vic ban" was handed to her. Deen (Metro) described Babe swapping Stan's ashes for custard power as "a seriously grim move that only Babe could have thought of." She also praised the scene where Buster Briggs (Karl Howman) threw a trifle over Babe's head and said, "She looked like a creature from the deep. Chilling."

Morgan (Digital Spy) disapproved of the Babe's "drawn out" departure and noted that she "lost count" with the amount of chances Mick and Linda provided Babe with. She also described the character as a "poisonous old cow" and a "cruel cook". Babe's departure appeared in an article published by Digital Spy, which compiled ten unmissable soap storylines airing the week the episode was broadcast. Its reporter, Kilkelly, warned that viewers could expect to see Babe's "recent bad behaviour" catching up with the Carter family. Lindsay (Metro) described Babe's final episode as "dramatic" and opined that he would "certainly miss her antics and deliciously poisonous dialogue." Kate White (Inside Soap) said that EastEnders should "hang on" to Babe, giving the reasons that "she always makes things happen", "she's genuinely very sinister" and "she's so entertaining", stating that her various scams show that she is "totally fearless when it comes to taking on the locals" and can be "relied upon to generate entertaining storylines—something Walford has been short of lately". White went on to say that Babe "can do more than [other soap villains] in a week with just one evil look" and called her "properly unhinged", saying that "Babe is the sort of silent threat that many underestimate at their peril". Finally, White said that Badland had "used every look and gesture to build up Babe's eccentric personality, and has been able to skip lightly frin dark to hilarious in a hearbeat. Babe has had us in stitches over the years, as well as frightening us silly. Surely you'd be mad to let go of a character that versatile?" Writing about Babe's final words, where she curses the Carter family and The Queen Victoria, an Inside Soap writer said, "The departing Aunt Babe, raging into the storm like some Disney witch, was the undoubted highlight of our soap week." Tyler (Inside Soap) said that Babe's departure "was the most wonderfully outrageous episode of EastEnders in months. Annette Badland's roar, as Babe cursed the entire Square, was camp, shameless, preposterous—and soap gold. We sincerely hope this isn't the last we see of her. Babe's revenge plot is too much fun to waste!" In February 2025, Radio Times ranked Babe as the 11th best EastEnders villain, with Laura Denby describing her as "the Carters' evil aunt".

== See also ==
- List of soap opera villains
