= Dominic Treadwell-Collins =

British television producer (born 1977)

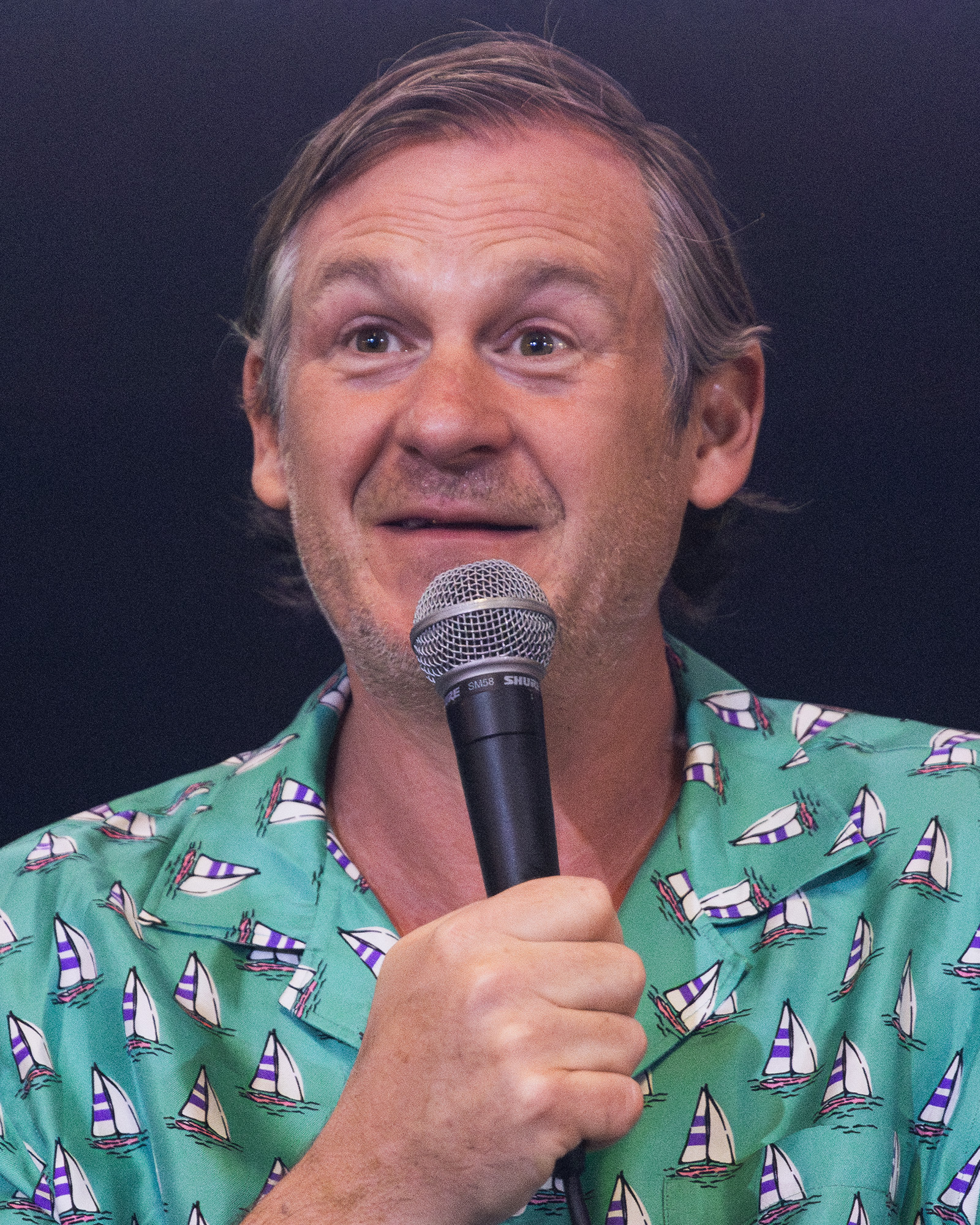
- Treadwell-Collins in 2026
- Born: Dominic Charles C.T. Collins; 26 August 1977 (age 49); Brent, London, England, UK
- Education: Merton College, University of Oxford
- Occupations: Television producer and writer

Dominic Treadwell-Collins (born 26 August 1977) is a British television producer and writer, known for his work on Rivals the Jilly Cooper adaptation for Disney+ and Hulu, the soap operas Family Affairs and EastEnders, creating the EastEnders spin-off series Kat & Alfie: Redwater and producing the award-winning A Very English Scandal for the BBC and Amazon. In 2020, he set up his own television company, Happy Prince, under ITV Studios.

== Early life ==
Born Dominic Charles C.T. Collins, Treadwell-Collins adapted his mother's maiden as a double-barreled compound surname.

Treadwell-Collins' father, Michael J. Collins, was an Irishman who emigrated to London from Skibbereen, West Cork, in the mid-1960s. His mother, Linda (née Treadwell), is a hairdresser from Kilburn. The couple married in Brent, London in 1975.

When Treadwell-Collins was in his teens, his father died in a drowning accident on holiday at the family home in Fort Lauderdale, Florida, USA. As a child, Treadwell-Collins had ambitions to work for the BBC. He lived in Radlett, Hertfordshire, near the BBC Elstree Centre, and used to look in through the gates.

== Education ==
Treadwell-Collins attended Edge Grove School, an independent school in Aldenham, Hertfordshire, followed by Harrow School. He then attended Merton College, part of the University of Oxford.

== Career ==
=== Early work ===
Treadwell-Collins' first job in television was for the ITV crime drama series Midsomer Murders, devising means of killing off characters. He moved to Talkback Thames for four years, working as a story producer on the Five soap opera Family Affairs, where he was taught to storyline by Ian Aldwinckle. In 2007, he named the show winning the 2005 British Soap Award for "Best Storyline" the biggest achievement of his career. Family Affairs was cancelled in 2005, which surprised Treadwell-Collins, who had expected that several award wins meant the show would be extended. He felt that viewers remained "incredibly loyal" to the series, and that it would have had greater longevity had it aired on a different channel, or been better publicised by Five.

=== EastEnders ===
Treadwell-Collins began working on the BBC soap opera EastEnders in October 2005, as a senior story editor under Brigie de Courcy, before becoming story producer in January 2007. He was responsible for running the EastEnders story department, working with the show's writers to devise future storylines.

In his first year on the show, he created the characters Ronnie and Roxy Mitchell, played by Samantha Womack and Rita Simons. In response to criticism of the show's lack of characters with disabilities, EastEnders producers planned to introduce several actors with disabilities in early 2009. Treadwell-Collins felt such characters are often portrayed as being unduly "noble" or "worthy", and suggested that EastEnders subvert this stereotype by making the new characters flawed. He created the storyline in which the Muslim character Syed Masood struggled to reconcile his faith and sexuality, and his relationship with Christian Clarke, as well as "The Secret Mitchell" and the "Who Killed Archie?" whodunnit, which culminated in the show's first live episode in February 2010.

Treadwell-Collins stood down from his EastEnders role on 25 June 2010, becoming head of development at Kudos' Lovely Day production company. The company is run by former EastEnders executive producer Diederick Santer, who commented: "Dominic is a brilliant and original talent, bursting with great ideas and gripping stories. Many of EastEnders' best storylines and characters of the last few years have come directly from his imagination and design, and he played an integral part in conceiving and plotting the hugely successful 25th anniversary episodes. I'm delighted to be resuming our creative partnership at Lovely Day." Treadwell-Collins stated: "I have had an amazing time at EastEnders and I couldn't have dreamed of a better place to work. Working on EastEnders has enabled me to create some fantastic storylines and characters that have been received so well but after four-and-a-half years of life in Walford, I feel that it is time to move on and try something new."

==== As executive producer ====
On 29 July 2013, it was announced that Treadwell-Collins would be returning to EastEnders as executive producer, taking over from Lorraine Newman, who resigned from the role after sixteen months on the job. He assumed the position on 19 August 2013 and his first episode as executive producer aired on 9 December 2013.

His first major cast change was to introduce Shirley Carter's (Linda Henry) extended family, who took over The Queen Vic – her brother (later revealed to be her son) Mick Carter (Danny Dyer), sister Tina (Luisa Bradshaw-White), Mick's common-law wife Linda (Kellie Bright) and their children Lee (Danny Hatchard), Nancy (Maddy Hill) and Johnny (Sam Strike).

The family was later expanded to include Shirley and Tina's father Stan Carter (Timothy West), their maternal aunt Babe Smith (Annette Badland) and their estranged mother Sylvie (Linda Marlowe), plus Shirley's son Dean Wicks (Matt Di Angelo) who returned to the show after several years. Other major characters introduced by Treadwell-Collins include Dot Branning's (June Brown) grandson Charlie Cotton (Declan Bennett), Pam (Lin Blakley) wife of established recurring character Les Coker (Roger Sloman), Donna Yates (Lisa Hammond), Vincent Hubbard (Richard Blackwood) as Kim Fox's husband, Claudette Hubbard (Ellen Thomas) as Vincent's mother and Donna's adoptive Mother, and the Kazemi family - Kush (Davood Ghadami), Carmel (Bonnie Langford) and Shakil Kazemi (Shaheen Jafargholi).

He reintroduced several characters who had previously featured in the show, including Sonia Fowler (Natalie Cassidy) Stacey Branning (Lacey Turner), Dean Wicks (Matt Di Angelo), Les Coker (Roger Sloman), Jane Beale (Laurie Brett), Kathy Beale (Gillian Taylforth), Honey Mitchell (Emma Barton) Jack Branning (Scott Maslen), and Steven Beale (Aaron Sidwell) who all returned permanently, while the likes of Peggy Mitchell (Dame Barbara Windsor), Nick Cotton (John Altman), Grant Mitchell (Ross Kemp) and Sam Mitchell (Danniella Westbrook) returning for guest appearances. The characters of Shabnam Masood, Bex Fowler, Ben Mitchell, Martin Fowler, Louise Mitchell, Jordan Johnson and Belinda Peacock were also reintroduced, but the roles were recast to Rakhee Thakrar, Jasmine Armfield, Harry Reid, James Bye, Tilly Keeper, Joivan Wade and Carli Norris respectively.

Treadwell-Collins also created a spin-off for the EastEnders characters Kat Moon (Jessie Wallace) and Alfie Moon (Shane Richie) set in Ireland called Kat & Alfie: Redwater, which started on BBC One and RTÉ One in May 2017.

Treadwell-Collins' decision to leave the show was announced on 18 February 2016. He described his choice as "not one I have taken lightly" and citied his reasons for leaving as wanting to "move on to other things". His final work on the show saw him produce the conclusion to the Who Killed Lucy Beale? storyline and produce the death of Peggy Mitchell (Dame Barbara Windsor). Of Windsor's request that he produce her exit storyline, Treadwell-Collins said "When Dame Barbara comes to you to produce her final episodes, you cannot say no." His final day at EastEnders was 6 May 2016.

=== Post EastEnders ===
Treadwell-Collins' new post as Head of Television at Blueprint Television was announced on 7 June 2016. Treadwell-Collins stated his admiration of films produced by Blueprints and his excitement to "develop their television arm". The co-chairman of Blueprint Pictures, Graham Broadbent, added that the company were "excited to have someone of his experience and calibre to launch Blueprint's TV side". Whilst at Blueprint, he developed and produced A Very English Scandal for the BBC and Amazon, starring Hugh Grant and Ben Whishaw, written by Russell T Davies and directed by Stephen Frears, winning Golden Globe, Emmy, Critics Choice, Rose D'Or, RTS and BAFTA awards.

He left Blueprint in 2019 to set up his own label, Happy Prince, at ITV Studios. In 2022, he wrote and produced Holding for ITV and Virgin Media, based on the novel by Graham Norton and directed by Kathy Burke.

Happy Prince’s second production – YOU&ME – was developed with new writer Jamie Davis. Executive Producer Russell T Davies, who brought Jamie’s script to Happy Prince, worked with Dominic and Head of Development Pia Masters to turn one film script into a three part returning television format about love and loss. Filmed over the summer of 2022 for ITV, You&Me aired on ITVX in February 2023.

In March 2023, Happy Prince began filming the eight part adaptation of Jilly Cooper’s RIVALS for Disney+ and Hulu. With a diverse writers room, the drama explored 1980s sexual and racial politics under the cover of a glossy romp. Executive produced by Dominic, Alexander Lamb, Laura Wade, Felicity Blunt, and Jilly Cooper RIVALS proved phenomenally popular with audiences becoming Disney+ UK’s biggest drama launch to date and winning critical acclaim with 9 BAFTA nominations securing wins for Hair & Makeup and Production Design and winning Dominic an RTS Award for writing.

Rivals received Programme of the Year and Best Drama Programme at The Broadcast Digital Awards, and was named 53 in The TIMES Top 100 British TV shows of the 21st century, and has just been nominated for an International Emmy for Best Drama Series. The highly anticipated second series is currently being filmed in and around Bristol for TX in 2026.
