= Stanley Carter =

Stanley Carter is the name of:

- Stanley B. Carter (1853–1888), lawyer and politician
- Stanley Carter, a fictional character in Marvel Comics also known as Sin-Eater
- Stanley Carter (composer), pen name of Frederick J. Redcliffe, who composed the music for "She Was Bred in Old Kentucky" and other songs during the 1890s
- Stan Carter, a fictional character from the soap opera EastEnders

== See also ==
- Carter Stanley
