= Tina Carter =

Fictional character from EastEnders

- EastEnders character
- Portrayed by: Luisa Bradshaw-White
- Duration: 2013–2022
- First appearance: Episode 4747; 18 November 2013
- Last appearance: Episode 6315; 29 July 2021 (appearance); Episode 6315; 24 February 2022 (skeleton hand)
- Created by: Dominic Treadwell-Collins
- Introduced by: Lorraine Newman
- Spin-off appearances: The Queen Vic Quiz Night (2020)
In-universe information
- Occupation: Waitress; Barmaid; Bar manager
- Father: Stan Carter
- Mother: Sylvie Carter
- Sisters: Shirley Carter
- Husband: Mark Reynolds (backstory); Andy (until 2010)
- Daughters: Zsa Zsa Carter
- Aunts: Babe Smith
- Nephews: Mick Carter; Dean Wicks; Jimbo Wicks
- Nieces: Carly Wicks
- Other relatives: Frankie Lewis; Lee Carter; Nancy Carter; Johnny Carter; Ollie Carter; Jade Masood

Tina Carter is a fictional character from the BBC soap opera EastEnders, portrayed by Luisa Bradshaw-White. The character first appeared on 18 November 2013, and was introduced as the sister of established character Shirley Carter (Linda Henry). She was the first of a set of new characters that expanded the Carter family in 2013. Tina was created by incoming executive producer Dominic Treadwell-Collins (although Tina was introduced by Lorraine Newman, a month before prior to Treadwell-Collins took over the executive producer role). Tina and Bradshaw-White's casting were announced on 19 September 2013. The character was previously mentioned on-screen due to her daughter, Zsa Zsa Carter (Emer Kenny), appearing on the show in 2010.

Tina's storylines mostly revolve around her relationship with her sister Shirley and relationships with Tosh Mackintosh (Rebecca Scroggs), who physically abuses her, and Sonia Fowler (Natalie Cassidy), which ends when Sonia falls out of love with her. Tina also accidentally runs over Janet Mitchell (Grace) and has several flings with Janet's father, Billy Mitchell (Perry Fenwick). In a later storyline, Tina feuds with Stuart Highway (Ricky Champ) when it emerges that he drugged and attacked her when she was a teenager. It was announced on 16 October 2020 that Bradshaw-White had quit her role and she made her last appearance on 28 December 2020, when Tina was murdered by Gray Atkins (Toby-Alexander Smith), with her corpse hidden underneath the floorboards of the Argee Bhajee restaurant, which remained undiscovered for over a year. She appeared in a flashback in an episode that aired on 29 July 2021. Her body was found by Phil Mitchell (Steve McFadden) on 24 February 2022, and her funeral aired on 6 April 2022.

== Creation and development ==
=== Casting and introduction ===
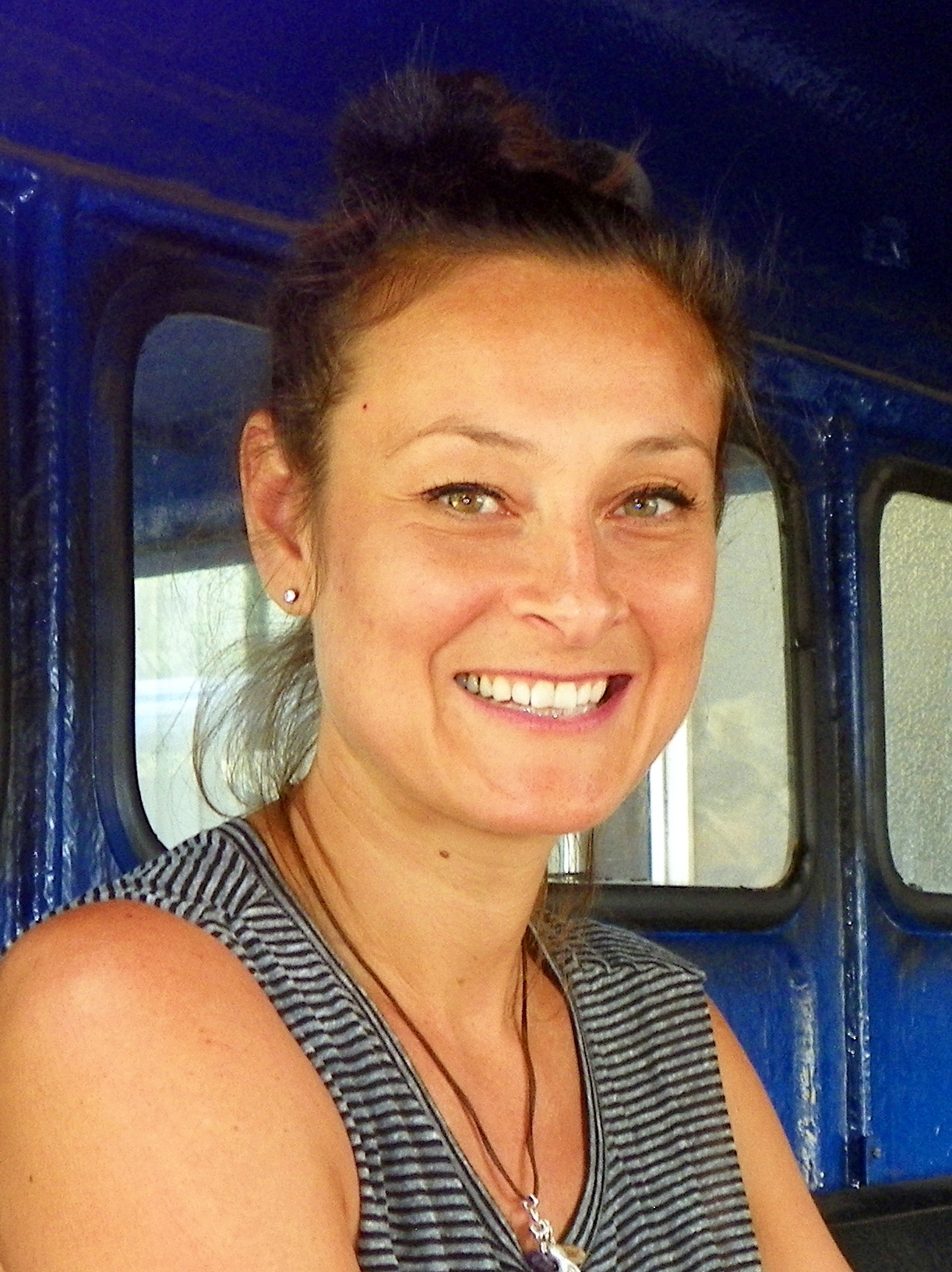
Luisa Bradshaw-White (pictured) played Tina.

Tina was introduced as the sister of established regular character Shirley Carter (Linda Henry), who has appeared on the show since 2006. Tina's daughter Zsa Zsa Carter (Emer Kenny) previously appeared in 2010, and mentioned her mother as living in Spain with her new husband. Two days before the character's arrival was announced, Treadwell-Collins posted a photo to Twitter of a bomber jacket with the name Tina on the back, sparking speculation that Shirley's sister had been cast. The casting of Luisa Bradshaw-White was announced on 19 September 2013, around two months before her first on-screen appearance.

Tina is described as 'loud, brash, cheeky and full of energy', with the potential to lead Shirley astray. Bradshaw-White expressed her excitement over the role, commenting that she was particularly excited as 'the energy between Tina and Shirley is explosive'. The role was changed for Bradshaw-White; Tina was initially described as 'an overweight 50-year-old who's past it'. Tina first appeared when Phil Mitchell (Steve McFadden) tracked her sister Shirley to her rundown flat, after she had been forced out of Walford by Carl White (Daniel Coonan). He convinced Shirley to return with him, and Tina followed soon after, escaping an abusive ex-girlfriend, Tosh Mackintosh; Rebecca Scroggs was introduced in this role in February of the following year.

=== Relationships ===
==== Carter family ====
Tina was introduced as the first of a new set of Carters, the family of Shirley, and therefore has a large amount of on-screen interaction with her family. Executive producer Dominic Treadwell-Collins compared Tina to her sister Shirley, saying that she was 'loud and brash' like her. She also seems to be a liability like Shirley, having parented Zsa Zsa badly and letting her fly off the handle at times. Despite this, Tina is more forgiving than her sister; for example, she forgives their father Stan Carter, played by Timothy West, for his bad parenting and alcoholism when they were children, whereas Shirley still holds a grudge against him. She has a good relationship with her nephew Mick (Danny Dyer) and his family, and shares a flat at one time with Shirley's son Dean Wicks (Matt Di Angelo).

==== Sonia Fowler ====
Tina became friends with Sonia Fowler, played by Natalie Cassidy, when she returned to the soap. Sonia, who was experiencing troubles in her marriage, received counsel from kindly Sonia and they shared a kiss, as Sonia is bisexual. However, due to her relationship with Tosh Mackintosh, the kiss went no further. Their friendship ended when Tosh found out about the kiss and ordered them to cut ties.

==== Tosh Mackintosh ====
Tina's past relationship with an abusive ex-girlfriend was hinted at when she was introduced. On 9 February 2014, it was announced Rebecca Scroggs would play Tosh Mackintosh, her firefighter ex-girlfriend who she would reconcile with. Tina tracked down Tosh after realising she still loved her. About their relationship, Scroggs said that 'there's something about Tina that Tosh is really drawn to', but Tina's family 'put pressure' on their relationship. Shirley was Tosh's main adversary and locked Tina in the lounge of The Queen Vic to try to stop her seeing Tosh after a showdown in which Tosh sprayed Shirley to the ground with her fireman's hose.

Several months into their relationship, Tosh was seen pushing to Tina to have a baby. Bradshaw-White said that Tosh pressures Tina into having a baby, telling her 'either they start a family – or she goes'. Tina was a bad mother to her daughter Zsa Zsa due to being addicted to drugs at the time, but Tosh insisted that Tina would be a better mother now as she 'really mothers everyone in the family'. It was reported that Tosh would become pregnant, but she was seen to lose the baby soon afterwards. This caused Tosh to become violent towards Tina again, hitting her on two separate occasions. Of the latter, more extreme attack, Jo Harvey Barringer of the Broken Rainbow UK commented that 'the violent punch Tosh (dealt) was calculated to put Tina in her place and to punish Tina for challenging Tosh's dominance in the relationship; a reminder that Tosh was in control and held all the power'.

=== Departure ===
In October 2020, confirmation surfaced that Bradshaw White would be departing from the show, with her final scenes slated to air around December. Tina met her demise on 28 December 2020, succumbing to Gray Atkins, who murdered her upon her discovery of his involvement in his wife Chantelle's death. Gray disposed of Tina's body by transporting it out of the square in the trunk of his car. Subsequently, Tina was reported missing, leaving uncertainty over whether she had perished or somehow survived.

Shirley fervently searched for her, eventually abandoning hope in an episode broadcast in January 2022. On February 4, it was unveiled that Gray had concealed Tina's remains beneath the floorboards of the Argee Bhajee. Viewers witnessed her decomposed body onscreen, confirming her tragic demise. Tina's body is found later that month, which sparks an investigation into her death. Tina's funeral then takes place in the episode airing on 4 April 2022.

== Storylines ==
Tina Carter was first mentioned in 2010 by her daughter Zsa Zsa Carter. However, she first came to Walford after her sister Shirley (Linda Henry) was tracked down by her ex-boyfriend Phil Mitchell (Steve McFadden). It turns out that Shirley has been residing in Tina's rundown flat, after she has been forced out of Walford and threatened by his enemy and ex-convict Carl White (Daniel Coonan) not long ago. Shirley agrees to return with Phil, and gives Tina money to escape her abusive girlfriend. She does this, and joins Shirley in Walford. They struggle to find somewhere to live as Tina and Phil do not get on, and end up sleeping on the floor of the house owned by Phil's cousin Billy (Perry Fenwick). At some point, Billy develops a crush on Tina; however, she rejects his advances before admitting that she is a lesbian – despite having been married to a man in the past and having a teenage daughter, Zsa Zsa Carter (Emer Kenny), who previously lived with Shirley in Walford.

Sometime later, Tina encourages Shirley to reconcile with her estranged son Mick (Danny Dyer) – who is initially thought to be Shirley's brother. They visit his wife Linda Carter (Kellie Bright) at her mother's pub in Watford but she is sceptical towards them. Tina later responds by stealing money from a bingo competition one night. Shirley finds out about this and returns the money before going on to reconcile with Mick, who then moves his family to Walford by buying The Vic from Phil at the end of 2013.

In 2014, Tina and Shirley help Mick run the pub, though Tina later gets a second job at the local café soon after. Tina befriends her colleague Sonia Fowler (Natalie Cassidy). Tina sleeps with Billy when drunk, but tells him that she does not have feelings for him and they agree to be just friends. She is delighted when her father Stan Carter (Timothy West), who the rest of the family are estranged from, makes amends with his children and moves into the Vic with them.

Tina realizes she is still in love with her abusive ex-girlfriend, Tosh Mackintosh (Rebecca Scroggs), and reconciles with her. She brings her to a family dinner, but Tosh and Shirley argue and after Shirley tries to stop Tina from seeing Tosh. Tina rebels and starts a full relationship with Tosh again, with them eventually moving into a flat nearby with Aleks Shirovs (Kristian Kiehling) and Jake Stone (Jamie Lomas). Tina supports Sonia with marital issues, and passes up a night out with Tosh to be with her. They share a passionate kiss, but afterward decide to just be friends. Tosh demands that Tina and Sonia end their friendship when she finds out, and accidentally causes Tina to hit her head on a door frame in a rage. They reconcile and Tosh tells Tina she wants to have a baby. Tina is reserved at first due to her bad parentage of Zsa Zsa, but eventually agrees and supports Tosh when she is inseminated. This is expensive and Tina begins dealing drugs from the café with the help of her aunt, Babe Smith (Annette Badland), but they are forced to stop when Mick and Shirley find out. Tosh is upset when Tina's colleague Carol Jackson (Lindsey Coulson) tells her about the drug dealing, and convinces Tina to raise the money by working extra shifts instead.

Tosh becomes pregnant through the insemination and they announce this at Stan's birthday party, although she loses the baby soon after. Depressed at this, Tosh accepts Tina's nephew Dean Wicks' (Matt Di Angelo) offer of being a sperm donor, without Tina's knowledge or consent. Tina is angry when she finds out, but forgives Tosh and supports her when she discovers she is not pregnant again. They fall out when Tosh accuses her of not wanting a baby, and Tosh punches her after taunting her. Tina again forgives her and decides to try to reconcile Tosh with her family by arranging a lunch for them. Her mother Judy (Jo Martin) comes, but her father makes an excuse, uncomfortable with Tosh's sexuality due to his Christian faith. Judy storms out when Tina tells her about their attempts to have a baby, upsetting Tosh further. Tina is devastated when Stan reveals that he is dying from prostate cancer, and is even more upset when she learns that Stan knew about his illness 3 years prior to him telling the family. She and Tosh urge Stan to see a private doctor, however he reveals that Stan's cancer is too aggressive to be cured, which leaves Tina distraught. Tina supports Sonia when she falls ill, and she confides in her that she spent the money from the charity calendar she organised on a gastric band in Bulgaria, to impress her husband Martin (James Bye). Tosh returns home while Sonia is hiding in Tina's room, but she manages to sneak out before Tosh realizes. When Martin fails to turn up to the Christmas party for Sonia's group "Fat Blasters", Sonia decides to announce her actions but Tina urges her not to; however, before she can, she collapses. When the paramedics arrive, Tina reveals Sonia has had an operation to fit a gastric band, which shocks Carol and Martin. Babe leads Tosh to believe that Tina is having an affair with Sonia and when Tina denies this, Tosh viciously beats her. The next day, Tina decides that she cannot forgive Tosh for what she has done and thinks it best to move back to the Vic, while Tosh leaves Walford when Tina breaks up with her. Mick stops Tina assisting Stan's requested suicide. Tina is devastated by Stan's death and delivers the eulogy. Tina and Sonia become partners, splitting up briefly when Tina finds out Sonia cheated with her estranged husband Martin. They reconcile when Sonia helps Linda after she goes into premature labour.

Tina and Sonia enjoy their relationship despite Tina's jealously. Sonia realizes that she wants another child and tells Tina. Tina is shocked and tells Sonia that she does not want children after messing up with Zsa Zsa. Sonia is angry when Tina drunkenly embarrasses Sonia's daughter Bex Fowler (Jasmine Armfield) when she is singing in public. When Sonia and her co-workers win a Pride of Walford award, Sonia decides she does not want to speak but Tina, drunk again, takes the microphone and humiliates Sonia by revealing she had previously stolen charity money. Tina and Sonia argue, and Tina then confides in Sophie Dodd (Poppy Rush) and they kiss and then have sex. She goes to Mick for advice and when she returns home, she starts packing but Sonia then appears and reveals that she has found a lump on her breast so decides not to tell Sonia about Sophie. However, when she goes home, Sophie is with Sonia, asking why Tina has not replied to her messages and has told Sonia everything. Sonia shouts at Tina to leave, but after they talk, they reunite and Tina promises to discuss her feelings and help out more. Sonia tells Tina that she wants a double mastectomy regardless of the result of her tests.

Tina is fired from the café when her bosses Ian Beale (Adam Woodyatt) and Jane Beale (Laurie Brett) decide to sell their restaurant, but eventually they decide not to sell and Tina gets her job back. Sonia starts to have doubts about her relationship with Tina. Sonia returns from a doctor's appointment to discover that Tina has moved her mother, Sylvie Carter (Linda Marlowe), who has Alzheimer's disease, into the house. Sonia vows to tell Tina their relationship is over but when Tina says she wants to care for Sylvie, Sonia promises to help. However, when Sonia arranges a Carter family dinner for Sylvie's sake, Martin tells her that Tina is not treating her properly. Martin tells Tina to be there for Sonia, mentioning Sonia's elective breast surgery that Tina did not know about. Tina asks Sonia about it, and Sonia says she cannot talk to Tina as she never acts grown up, so Tina insists that she can change. Tina considers asking Social Services for more help caring for Sylvie, but after a good day with her mother, Tina believes the family are the only people who should help, leaving Sonia frustrated. When Tina is forced to leave Sylvie alone, she becomes scared and bites Sonia when she gets home, but Sonia hides this from Tina. Later, Sonia admits to Dot Cotton (June Brown) that she no longer loves Tina, and the next day, Sonia ends their relationship saying she has fallen out of love; Tina is devastated and cries to Linda. Sonia then leaves for a new job. Tina struggles to cope with caring for Sylvie and tells Shirley how lonely she feels; Shirley invites Tina and Sylvie to move in with her. Tina is later annoyed when she discovers Shirley is allowing Sylvie to sleep all day to avoid caring for her, and when Shirley goes to prison to help alleviate Mick's debts, Tina accuses her of doing so just to avoid Sylvie. Tina then struggles on her own, and eventually decides to place her in care. The day before she is due to be assessed, Tina throws Sylvie a party. After Tina puts Sylvie to bed that night, she gets in the bath and ends up being electrocuted. Tina is devastated by her mother's death and is then forced to move out of the flat, so she stays with Michelle Fowler (Jenna Russell) for a while, before moving into The Vic.

Tina was attacked by a group of men with knives but she escapes in her car. Shaken, Tina accidentally hits someone with her car but she drives off, thinking it was Dot's cat, Dave, unaware the person she hit was Billy's daughter, Janet Mitchell (Grace). When Tina finds out that she ran over Janet, she becomes plagued with guilt. She confides in Shirley, who orders Tina not to go to the police. When Billy and his fiancée, Honey Mitchell (Emma Barton), have an argument, Billy finds solace in Tina and they spend the night together. The next morning, Billy feels guilty and begs Tina not to tell Honey. Tina agrees, not wanting to destroy Billy's relationship after putting his daughter in hospital. Tina confesses to Billy that she hit Janet. Billy agrees to accompany Tina to the police station, but Shirley stops them, declaring that if Tina confesses to the police, she will tell Honey about their one-night stand. Shirley later gives Tina a ticket to Spain for two weeks. Although Tina doesn't want to go, Shirley forces her to leave, saying she needs to clear her head. When she returns, Tina tells Shirley she could be pregnant by Billy, but a pregnancy test is negative.

Tina is involved in the break-up of Billy and Honey after a mix-up in the launderette when Honey receives Linda's underwear with her own washing, and sees Billy and Tina hugging, then accuses Billy of having an affair with Tina, forcing Billy to admit to the one-night stand. Shirley sees Honey and Tina talking and assumes that Honey knows Tina hit Janet so reveals this. Tina helps a pregnant girl, Georgi (Holly Donovan), in the café and finds out she is a friend of Zsa Zsa's. Tina delivers Georgi's baby and then calls Zsa Zsa. Tina tries to reunite Billy and Honey but it backfires when Honey flirts with Jack instead. Tina then visits Zsa Zsa and when she returns, Stuart Highway (Ricky Champ), an old friend of Mick's, is visiting the Carters. She goes with him to a 1980s night and he is annoyed when she gets a woman's phone number instead of him so he requests the song "We Call It Acieed" and when it plays, Tina has a terrifying flashback. Tina breaks down at work; she tells Sonia that when she was 19 or 20, she would play a game with Stuart and his friends that involved mild "torture", but once she was locked in a car boot, tied up and gagged, and feared she would die when she smelt burning; Tina realizes that the same song was playing in the car that day and believes that Stuart is responsible. She tells Stuart this, but he says it must have been someone else and he will find out who it was, to which Tina agrees. Sonia encourages Tina to tell Mick about what happened to her but when she goes to tell him, Stuart has already spoken to him and Linda. Mick says he will help find out who did it, Stuart mentions that Tina was called a "slag" by the person who did it despite her not telling him, so she accuses him again but he still denies it. Tina gets drunk in the club and gets angry when someone calls her a "slag", she goes missing and Billy tells the Carters what happened in the club. Linda later finds Tina at the police station. Mick then overhears as Tina tells Linda that it was Stuart. Mick finds Tina's old diary and they recall what else happened that day; they remember getting new football kits and Tina recalls her abuser wearing shirt number 9, which Mick says Stuart was wearing that day. Mick confronts Stuart who still denies everything. Stuart keys his own car, claiming that Tina has done it, and accuses her of starting a hate campaign against him. He makes various threats and teases her, saying she is lying about everything and that one day she will wake up in the boot of a car again. He sings "We Call It Acieed" whilst goading her with a wrench, which she takes and whacks him on the head with it, knocking him out. Tina is arrested and tells the police about being locked in the car but they ignore this as she has no witnesses. Tina is released while Stuart tells various people that Tina attacked him. Stuart decides to flip a coin to decide if he should retract his statement, while Mick tries to track down old friends to find witnesses for Tina. Stuart comes to the Vic and says he was going to withdraw his statement but Shirley attacks Stuart and he proclaims that Tina will go down. However, one of Mick's old friends, Dylan Box (Ricci Harnett), visits and says Stuart once did the same to him as he did to Tina and has already reported him to the police. Stuart is arrested but continues to deny everything.

When Linda struggles with alcoholism, Mick decides that they need to sell the Queen Victoria pub and move out, leaving Tina homeless. She and Shirley are taken in by Gray Atkins (Toby-Alexander Smith), who begins to be annoyed by Tina's laziness. Tina blames Ian Beale (Adam Woodyatt), who bought the pub, for her situation, and confronts him. When Ian is later found attacked and unconscious, Tina is a suspect. As Gray is a lawyer, he acts as her defence. However, when Tina begins to damage his reputation by talking about his controlling nature, Gray pays a man to say that he saw Tina at the crime scene. Gray suggests that Tina leaves Walford to avoid being sentenced, but when she discovers that the witness' statement is unreliable, she confronts Gray on his lies. She questions him over the death of his wife Chantelle (Jessica Plummer), and when she learns that Gray abused and murdered her, she attempts to escape, a chase ensues until Gray grabs her as she attempts to get out the front door and strangles her to death. A year later, it is revealed that Gray buried Tina's body under the floorboards of the Argee Bhajee. In February 2022, Tina's body is discovered by Phil.

== Reception ==
In a poll from Digital Spy soon after Tina's introduction, Tina was voted the fourth favourite new Carter, behind Mick (Dyer), Johnny (Sam Strike) and Nancy (Maddy Hill). EastEnders and Bradshaw-White have been praised for the Tina and Tosh domestic violence story by the charity Broken Rainbow UK, who said that the story helped "portray the very real experiences our service users tell us about" in the LGBT community. In July 2018, Bradshaw-White was longlisted for the "Best Actress" award at The Inside Soap Awards. She did not progress to the viewer-voted shortlist.

== See also ==
- List of soap operas with LGBT characters
