= Stan Carter =

Fictional character from EastEnders

- EastEnders character
- Portrayed by: Timothy West
- Duration: 2014–2015
- First appearance: Episode 4793; 27 January 2014
- Last appearance: Episode 5048; 10 April 2015
- Created by: Dominic Treadwell-Collins
- Introduced by: Dominic Treadwell-Collins
In-universe information
- Other names: Stanley Reginald Carter
- Occupation: Retired fishmonger
- Wife: Sylvie Carter (backstory)
- Daughters: Shirley Carter; Tina Carter
- Grandsons: Mick Carter; Dean Wicks; Jimbo Wicks
- Granddaughters: Carly Wicks; Zsa Zsa Carter
- Other relatives: Lee Carter; Johnny Carter; Nancy Carter

Stan Carter is a fictional character from the BBC soap opera EastEnders, played by Timothy West. He first appeared in the show's 4793rd episode, originally broadcast in the United Kingdom on 27 January 2014, and was introduced as the father of established characters Shirley (Linda Henry) and Tina Carter (Luisa Bradshaw-White). He was introduced as part of a set of new characters that expanded the Carter family across 2013 and 2014, headed by executive producer Dominic Treadwell-Collins. Stan and West's casting were announced on 12 December 2013.

Stan's storylines have mostly revolved around his relationships with Shirley, Tina and grandson Mick Carter (Danny Dyer), a sour relationship with his sister-in-law Babe Smith (Annette Badland), being involved in a love triangle between his estranged wife Sylvie Carter (Linda Marlowe) and established character Cora Cross (Ann Mitchell), and a terminal battle with prostate cancer. On 5 October 2014, it was announced that West would be leaving his role, less than a year after his debut. His final appearance aired in the 5048th episode, originally broadcast on 10 April 2015, when Stan died.

== Creation and development ==
=== Casting and introduction ===
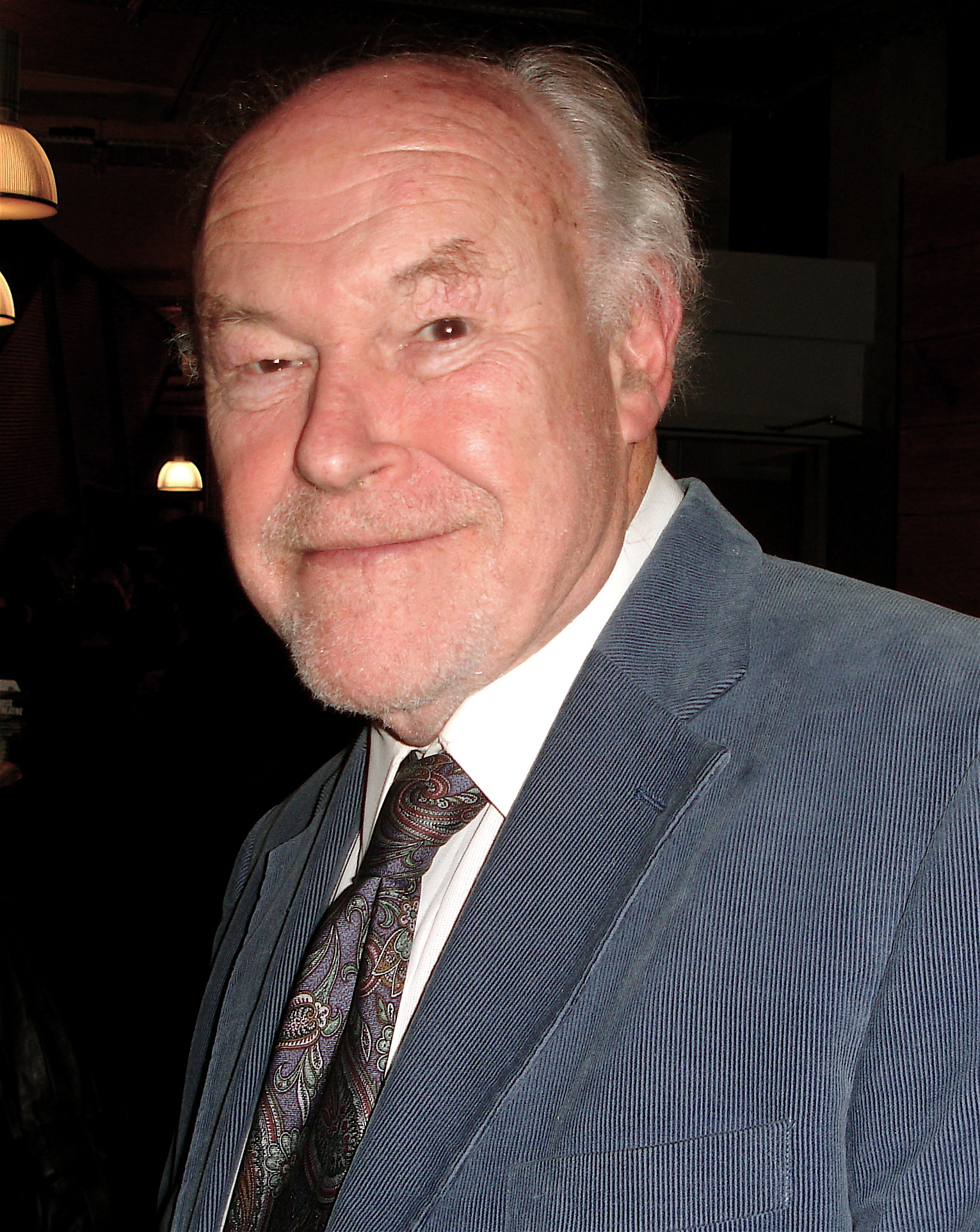
Timothy West portrayed Stan.

Stan was introduced as the father of established regular characters Shirley (Linda Henry), Tina (Luisa Bradshaw-White), and Mick Carter (Danny Dyer), although Mick was later revealed to be Stan's grandson. The casting of Timothy West was announced on 12 December 2013, when West commented, "I am excited to be joining EastEnders for the first time. Stan is a wonderful character and I look forward to seeing what is going to happen to him."

Stan is described as "opinionated and curmudgeonly" retired Billingsgate fishmonger with a manipulative side. He is said to be "delighted" to be around his children again, as he has been lonely since his wife left him 30 years ago. A show spokesperson said, "Stan is no fluffy old man in a cardigan, and it won't be long before he starts manipulating the whole Carter clan from the comfort of his armchair." Executive producer, Dominic Treadwell-Collins, introduced Stan as part of his plan to reinvigorate the show's older generation and teased Stan would "start to fill in some holes in the dark Carter family history." Treadwell-Collins based Stan on his own grandfather, saying "Stan Carter is my grandfather, a former Billingsgate fish porter who was a big powerful man and now sits in his chair still trying to rule his family."

Stan Carter was Canning Town born and bred, telling anyone who'll listen that he learnt everything he knows at the school of hard knocks; life is tough and a man gets on with it. Stan was an arch manipulator; he'd lie and cheat to get what he wanted, taking down anyone who stood in his way. And although he might have been wary of Shirley and Mick, he knew where their weak spots lay and would do anything he could to get them back under his control...

— A reporter from the EastEnders website on Stan (2015)

West described Stan as "tough and lonely" and "concerned" that there is nobody around him as he ages. He said he was attracted to the role of Stan because he liked the "foundation of Stan as a character" and he feels he will have a "wonderful time" on the show. Speaking of his first scene, West said he had to film two "quite heavy scenes" on his first day on set, which he felt was "very intense". When discussing plot lines for 2014, Treadwell-Collins said he wants to see younger characters through the eyes of their parents and not the other way around and that was part of the reason behind Stan's introduction.

Stan was introduced on-screen on 27 January 2014 when Shirley, Mick and Tina visit him at his rundown flat needing money to fix the rising damp in their pub, The Queen Victoria. Mick and Tina arrive at his door, but he demands to see Shirley if they want their money. Speaking of Stan's intentions behind giving the money to Shirley, West said, "He's got the money to spare and he wants to see them all together in the pub. If he knows where they are, he can use it as a way to get back into their lives. Also, giving someone money gives you a certain hold over them, which is what Stan wants." Stan appeared again on 20 February 2014, before arriving permanently on 31 March 2014.

=== Relationships ===
==== Carter family ====
Stan has a large amount of on-screen interaction with his family, living at the centre of the family, The Queen Victoria when he permanently arrives on Albert Square. Stan is shown to have an estranged relationship with his eldest daughter, Shirley Carter, played by Linda Henry, with West saying there is "tension" between father and daughter and that makes Stan "very wary of her." Despite this, Stan has a good relationship with his youngest daughter, Tina Carter, played by Luisa Bradshaw-White, and West felt that they had the "best relationship out of the lot of them". West also said how Stan enjoys the warmth and kindness that Tina provides. West felt Stan was "delighted" to see "son" Mick Carter, played by Danny Dyer, again, even though they slightly avoided each other. Mick blames Stan for "things that have gone wrong to him – as well as things that he doesn't know about, things that he is confused about and things he's unhappy about." Dyer praised West and his role as Stan, saying "Tim has brought something to the part that we never thought he would." West revealed in an interview with Claire Webb of Radio Times that he originally hated his on-screen family, but "now absolutely adores them". When Stan meets Mick's children, Johnny and Nancy, played by Sam Strike and Maddy Hill, in April, he manages to insult Johnny's sexuality, which Johnny does not take well. Speaking of the meeting, West said: "He likes Johnny but can't really cope with the fact he is gay, but after an initial, very rude couple of outbursts about both Tina and Johnny being gay, he warms to them both." West said that Stan's relationship with his ex-wife, Sylvie Carter (Linda Marlowe), was "stormy". Marlowe said that Sylvie's arrival is a "big shock" for him because "one minute she's saying something like wanting to run away with him and the next minute she's saying, 'Who?'"

==== Cora Cross ====
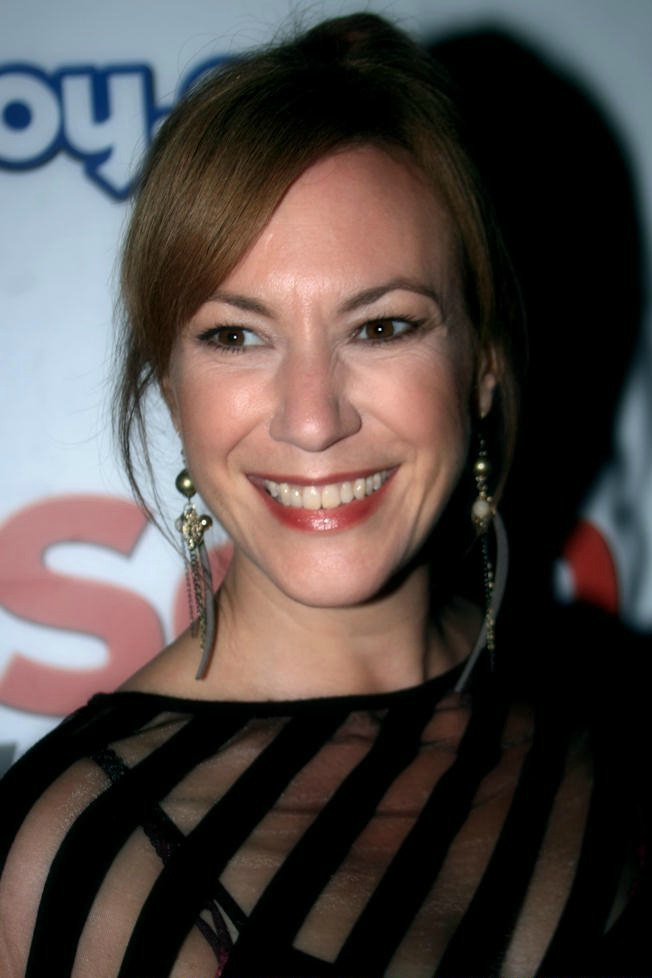
Tanya Franks (pictured) portrayed Rainie Cross, Cora's daughter who caused problems in Stan and Cora's relationship.

An on-screen storyline begun in May 2014 when Stan decided to loan Cora Cross (Ann Mitchell), money in order for her to move into a flat. Cora and Stan's friendship progressed, to the amusement of his family and sometimes annoyance of their friend, Patrick Trueman (Rudolph Walker). At the 2014 British Soap Awards, Mitchell teased that there is "some interesting stuff" with Cora, including her relationship with Stan. Cora and Stan's relationship enters a rough patch when Cora discovers that Mick was arrested for kerb crawling and realises her daughter Rainie Cross (Tanya Franks) was the prostitute involved. This puts strain on the relationship when Stan is unable to choose between Cora and Mick and when Stan tries to get Cora to clear Mick's name, it causes tension between them. Mick later reveals that he was covering for Ian Beale (Adam Woodyatt) and Stan and Cora resume their relationship. Stan's prostate cancer storyline affected his relationship with Cora, as she struggled to cope owing to her own past with cancer. It was announced on 6 December 2014 that Stan's final Christmas would see him transform the pub's barrel store into a "winter wonderland" for him and Cora to spend time together. It was revealed that the elderly couple would spend a poignant moment dancing together. It was later announced that Stan's ex-wife, Sylvie (Marlowe), would return to Albert Square on Christmas Day when Mick invites her to dinner. Cora becomes uncomfortable with Sylvie and decides to leave, annoying Stan who was hoping to enjoy his final Christmas. On 27 December 2014, it was announced that Cora would decide to leave Walford with her grandson, Dexter Hartman (Khali Best), to live with her daughter, Ava Hartman (Clare Perkins) in Newcastle and that Stan would "beg" Cora not to leave Walford. Stan will reportedly go to the tube station to say a final goodbye, but try persuading Cora to stay by admitting he wants to spend his final months with her. The scenes aired on 2 January 2015, where Cora decided to stay with Stan in Walford.

On 30 December 2014, it was revealed that Stan would share a kiss with Sylvie, sparking trouble in his relationship with Cora. Digital Spy reported that Sylvie would believe that her grandson, Dean Wicks (Matt Di Angelo) is Stan until the song, Unforgettable by Nat King Cole begins playing and she recognises her ex-husband, before dancing with him. They revealed that Cora would devastated by this and furious when Sylvie leaves the following day and Stan returns to her. The show announced on 10 March 2015 that Stan would propose to Cora after asking Tina to bring him a ring from home. They announced that when Stan manages to see Cora alone, he proposes and on 19 March 2015, viewers saw Cora agree to marry Stan. On 31 March 2015, details of Stan's death were announced. It was announced that Babe Smith (Annette Badland) would try to ruin Stan and Cora's wedding day by bringing Sylvie to share a final farewell with Stan and that Shirley and Mick would reunite, before Shirley sits with Stan as he dies. Stan will also decide to bring his wedding day forward owing to his short time left and they prepare to marry. Viewers watched Stan unable to marry Cora owing to poor health on 9 April 2015, but plan to reschedule for the following day. However, Stan was still too ill and did not marry Cora. Stan's death began a new storyline for Cora which saw her 'leave' Walford, but actually become homeless.

=== Prostate cancer and departure ===
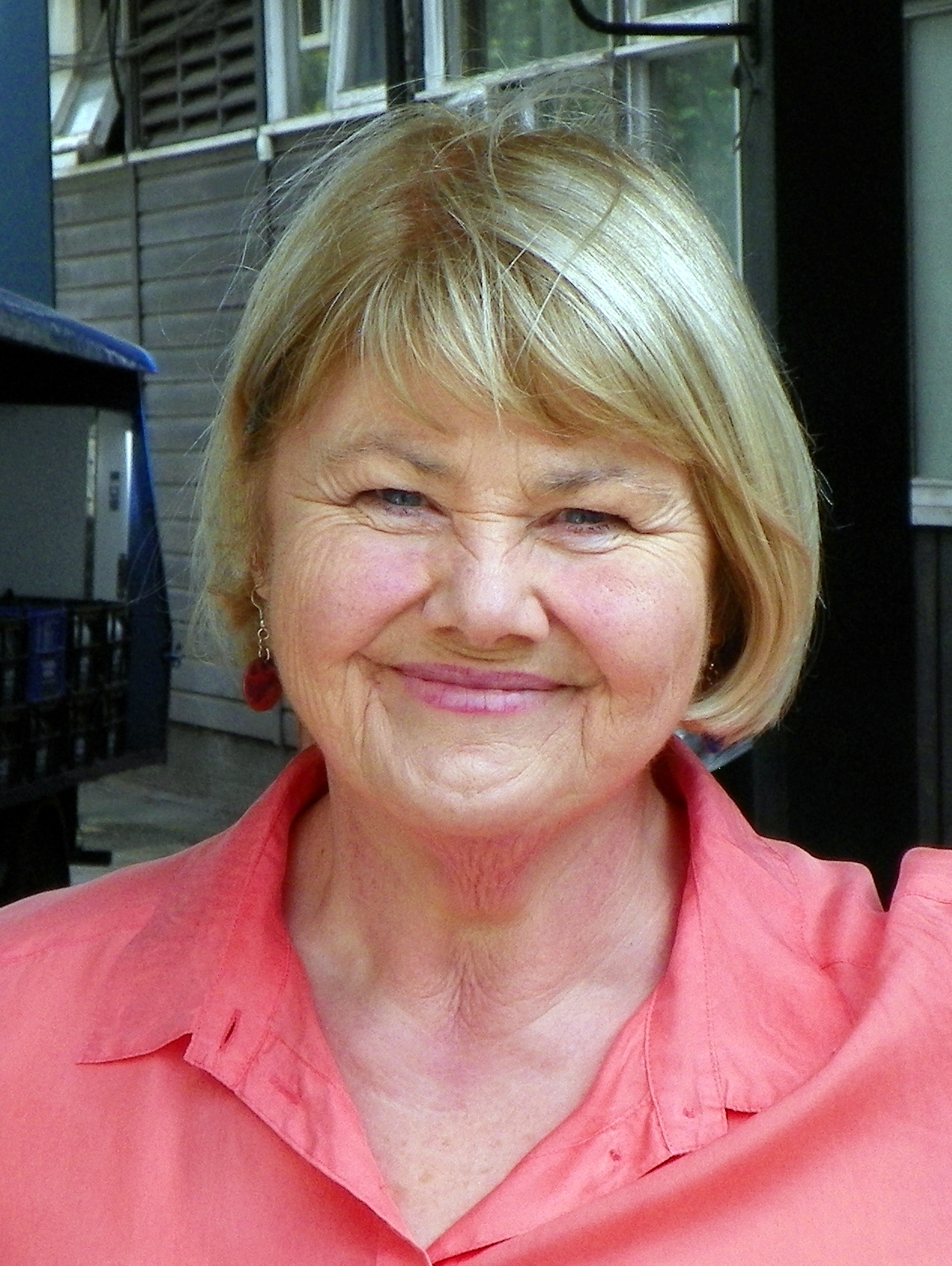
Babe Smith, played by Annette Badland (pictured), revealed Stan's cancer to his family.

On 5 October 2014, it was announced that West would be leaving the show in a "dramatic" storyline. Dominic Treadwell-Collins, executive producer, said of West's departure, "When you have an actor of Tim's calibre joining your cast, you treasure every day that you have him – and we knew from the start that Stan's stay with the rest of the Carter family would be a finite one. But what a stay – and as we draw towards Stan's exit from the show, the audience should get ready as one of Britain's finest actors pulls out all the stops and gives his King Lear..." It was reported on 2 November 2014 that Babe Smith (Annette Badland) would grow suspicious of Stan's whereabouts and when she discovers the truth, order him to tell his family. Over a week later, it was announced that Stan would confirm he has terminal prostate cancer to his family after Babe hastily tells them at Lee's birthday meal. These scenes were praised by Prostate Cancer UK. On 20 December 2014, Dyer revealed on The Graham Norton Show that Stan would ask Mick to help him die in a new euthanasia storyline. Dyer said, "I'm juggling about eight storylines at the moment. My old man is on his way out. My mother's got Alzheimer's – she's not my mother, my sister's actually my mum. My dad dying – he's not my dad, he's actually my grandad – he wants me to smother him." The prostate cancer began taking its effect on Stan's health on 23 January 2015 when Stan collapses in mid-commotion. Digital Spy's Sophie Dainty reported in January 2015 that the Carters would clash over Stan's request to be killed by his family as Tina agrees to helping him, but Mick firmly disagrees. Mick even informs the family of Stan's request and they strongly disagree. Stan's request was made following his collapse. West praised show bosses for handling Stan's cancer storyline the way they have and their way of handling West's decision to leave the show, "They very kindly said I could have some time out and they would send me to South Africa or prison. But I suggested something finite like death so they decided it would be good for me to have a disease of which I would know about and one where it could be arranged for me to die in six months' time."

On 19 February 2015, it was revealed West had already filmed his final scenes and left the show. Former Fawlty Towers star, Andrew Sachs, was announced to be joining the show on 10 March 2015 as Cyril Bishop, roommate of Stan when he is admitted to hospital. Sachs' first scenes were announced to air on 18 March 2015. Cyril died in the following episode, saddening Stan. Bradshaw-White teased Stan's exit week in an interview with Inside Soap, saying that Tina would take over Stan's care when Mick and Shirley become too embroiled in arguing to notice the pain he is going through. Discussing Stan's death, Bradshaw-White said, "Stan has another one of his episodes and Tina just falls apart. So the rest of the family end up sending her home – they think she's not going to be able to cope with him dying. Tina goes back to The Vic thinking that she'll come in and see her dad again in the morning, but then he tragically dies that night." Stan's final scenes aired on 10 April 2015 when after an emotional heart-to-heart with Shirley, he peacefully died in a hospice. Rather than the regular "Doof Doofs" that feature at the end of each episode, "Fly Me to the Moon", as sung by Tony Bennett, was played over the credits in tribute to Stan. Following his on-screen exit, West spoke out in support of Prostate Cancer UK and signed up for the Men United campaign, "Stan was probably the archetypal bad patient. He was very slow in thinking about his condition and recognising what it might be. He was slow to seek diagnosis, slow to act on the diagnosis and reluctant to see doctors. He was terrible really, something we should all look at and not do the same. What Men United seeks to do, and it's terribly important, is to hold out a hand to people to say, 'Come on, you will see people here with whom you can swap experiences, swap ideas, swap thoughts, swap feelings'. You don't have to stand there and wait for people to come, because they won't. You just need a little push and you will like it when you get there."

== Storylines ==
Mick Carter (Danny Dyer) visits Stan with Shirley Carter (Linda Henry) and Tina Carter (Luisa Bradshaw-White) as he is in desperate need of money. Stan forces Shirley, who he has been estranged from him the longest, to accept the money, and their angst is revealed to have started when Stan's drinking meant a young Mick and Tina went into care. Stan gives Shirley Deano's (Matt Di Angelo) mobile number, saying that he is now going by the name of Dean. A few weeks later, Shirley learns from her aunt Babe Smith (Annette Badland) that Dean has been staying with Stan. Shirley visits him, expecting to see Dean but Stan tells her that Dean went away a few days ago. A few weeks later, Mick receives news that Stan has been involved in an accident and broken his ankle. He visits him in hospital and Tina brings him to the pub, where they agree to stick it out for three weeks. After Mick's wife Linda Carter (Kellie Bright) forbids Stan to smoke in the house, he secretly smokes out of the window whilst the family is out, accidentally causing a small fire when the cigarette is not stubbed out properly. He is rescued by his great-grandson Lee Carter (Danny Hatchard) who the rest of the family believed was still serving in Afghanistan. It is revealed Lee has been staying with Stan for a week. After Mick believes Stan has been wetting the bed, a furious Stan demands to be taken back home. Whilst there, he is visited by Dean, who is in trouble with the law for handling stolen goods. When the police arrive, Stan takes the blame and is arrested. Mick later collects him and returns him to Walford.

Stan later flirts with Cora Cross (Ann Mitchell), and offers her a loan when he learns that she is struggling for money. When Nancy Carter (Maddy Hill) has an epileptic seizure, Stan and Shirley unite to help her and successfully deal with the issue. Wanting to reconcile with Shirley further, Stan calls Dean to The Vic. However, the reunion does not go well and Mick ends up punching Dean when he turns nasty with Shirley. Shirley blames Stan for the situation and threatens to throw him out, but he tells her if she does that he will reveal that it was her, not Shirley's mother Sylvie, that tried to drown Mick when he was very young. When the Carters decide to re-paint the exterior of The Vic, Tina tells Mick that she can remember when they were decorating and when Mick nearly drowned in a bath, and that their mother Sylvie was not present. Mick believes that Stan was the culprit who tried to drown him, and orders him to leave The Vic immediately. Mick later violently grabs him and taunts him with drowning in the bath, although Shirley stops with the truth. Stan helps Linda allow her son, Johnny Carter (Sam Strike), some independence after he reveals he is gay. Stan grows closer to Cora when he holds her a late birthday celebration as everyone forgets the date. He refuses to believe Mick is guilty of soliciting a prostitute when he arrested for the crime, despite his plea in court. Cora reveals the offence to the whole pub, and distances herself from Stan. He is suspicious and realises when speaking to Cora's granddaughter Lauren Branning (Jacqueline Jossa) that Cora knows the prostitute involved. Cora apologises to the Carters when her daughter Rainie Cross (Tanya Franks), the prostitute, confesses that she lied about Mick.

Babe becomes suspicious when Stan frequently vanishes off the square. She follows him to the hospital, where she discovers he has terminal prostate cancer. She urges him to tell his family, but he insists he wants to deal with it alone. However, an upset Babe reveals the cancer at Lee's 22nd birthday celebrations. He is angry with her and tries to lie his way out of the truth, but later confesses that this Christmas is likely to be his last. Cora is very upset to realise the truth as well, as her husband died of cancer several years ago. Stan confronts Babe and reveals he knows she is hiding Shirley; this leads Mick and Dean to bring her back to Walford. Christmas lunch is unsettled when Stan's ex-wife Sylvie Carter (Linda Marlowe) visits. Cora storms off upset and the day is later upset when Shirley admits that she is Mick's mother. Stan throws Babe out and urges Mick and Tina to carry on as normal, but he is left reeling when Mick tells him that Dean has raped Linda. After he collapses in the Square, Stan tells Tina and Mick he would like them to help him end his life. Although Mick furiously refuses, Tina eventually agrees, but Mick stops her before she can. This causes Mick and Stan to fallout. Stan tries to arrange a trip to the dogs for the Carters, but they are concerned for his health. Before they can leave, he loses feeling in his legs and is rushed to hospital, where he tells them he does not want them to visit and wants the money he loaned Shirley and Dean for Blades' back. He learns that he will never be able to walk again owing to his cancerous tumour pushing on his spine. Babe and Cora visit him, and he proposes to Cora, which upsets Babe as she reveals she never stopped loving him. Cora accepts after Babe gives her her blessing, delighting Stan.

Stan returns home temporarily, but is sent into a hospice against his own will as his health continues to deteriorate. On Good Friday 2015, Dean returns to Albert Square alongside his father Buster Briggs (Karl Howman), insisting on visiting Stan at the hospital before he flees the country. Shirley calls the police to stop Dean leaving, and he is arrested for breaking his bail conditions, which saddens Stan. The following week, Stan attempts to bring his family together by asking Mick to make amends with Shirley, but although he tries, she refuses to show up at Stan and Cora's wedding ceremony. The ceremony is interrupted when Stan appears to be in pain, and the nurses give him pain relief. He promises Cora that they will marry the next day and she sleeps over in his room. Shirley also shows up there to be with him in the middle of the night, having had a change of heart after hearing of Jim Branning's (John Bardon) death. Stan's health rapidly deteriorates over the night, and the Carters and Cora keep a bedside vigil by his side. When Mick and Shirley argue, Stan advises them to make peace for his sake. Mick leaves while Shirley stays with Stan. Shirley reminisces the times she had with Mick when he was young. Stan hints to Shirley that she should put her family problems to rest, before dying peacefully.

== Reception ==
Following the airing of West's first episode, he received praise through the social networking site, Twitter. Viewers called West "bloody brilliant", "amazing" and a "great actor", with others saying how they enjoyed the pairing of West and Linda Henry (Shirley) and how the casting of West was "genius" and "another great signing". Katy Brent-Slater of Daily Mirror praised a June episode of the show, which featured Stan and Linda Carter (Kellie Bright) opening up to each other over the death of Linda's father, Johnny. Prostate Cancer UK praised the show for its handling of Stan's prostate cancer storyline, saying that the show is helping to "break down one of the biggest taboos around men's health" with the plot. Karen Sumpter, the organisation's clinical lead, praised the storyline, "I think EastEnders has done a fantastic job of presenting the real issues men face, whilst building a believable drama." Duncan Lindsay from the Metro said, "Stan becomes infuriated by Cyril's presence but something tells us that before the inevitable heartbreaking finale of the tale, the pair could become good friends a la Morgan Freeman and Jack Nicholson in The Bucket List", and said that Sachs' appearance in the show is "a treat for viewers".

Following the airing of his final episode, West received further praise through Twitter, with one user stating "What a wonderful piece of acting by the cast of Eastenders tonight, especially Timothy West.", "Timothy West is a fantastic actor! RIP Stan." and "Crying so much at tonight's @bbceastenders Timothy West was so so amazing, he will be truly missed! #RIPStan" Danny Walker of the Daily Mirror felt the cast made "stellar performances" in the build-up to Stan's death and thought Stan's death was "emotional" and "brilliant". Lindsay said that Stan's death was "devastating" and praised West, Henry and Dyer for their acting in the final scenes. In a "farewell" feature for Beamly, Brent-Slater described Stan as "wonderful, grumpy and generally brilliant". Dyer and Bright featured in an EastEnders special feature, EastEnders: Back to Ours, in which they watch clips of their time on the show; during this, both Dyer and Bright praised West and his acting, with Bright calling him a "legend".

== See also ==
- List of soap opera villains
