= Dean Wicks =

Soap opera character

- EastEnders character
- Portrayed by: Matt Di Angelo
- Duration: 2006–2008, 2014–2016, 2023–2024
- First appearance: Episode 3076; 2 January 2006
- Last appearance: Episode 6973; 4 September 2024
- Introduced by: Kate Harwood (2006); Dominic Treadwell-Collins (2014); Chris Clenshaw (2023)
In-universe information
- Other names: Deano Wicks
- Occupation: Market trader; Barman; Hair stylist; Businessman; Restaurant owner
- Father: Buster Briggs
- Mother: Shirley Carter
- Adoptive father: Kevin Wicks
- Stepmother: Denise Fox (adoptive)
- Brothers: Mick Carter
- Half-brothers: Jimbo Wicks
- Half-sisters: Carly Wicks
- Daughters: Jade Masood
- Grandfathers: Stan Carter
- Grandmothers: Sylvie Carter
- Aunts: Tina Carter
- Nephews: Lee Carter; Johnny Carter; Ollie Carter; Jimmy Wicks
- Nieces: Frankie Lewis; Nancy Carter
- First cousins: Zsa Zsa Carter
- Other relatives: Babe Smith

Dean Wicks (also known as Deano) is a fictional character from the BBC soap opera EastEnders played by Matt Di Angelo. He made his first appearance on 2 January 2006. It was announced on 18 August 2007 that the characters of Deano and his sister Carly Wicks (Kellie Shirley) were being axed by executive producer Diederick Santer. Deano made his final appearance on 7 February 2008. On 15 January 2014, it was announced that Deano, now called Dean, would be returning and he first reappeared on 11 April of that year. Di Angelo took a three-month break from the soap from January to April 2015, with a one-off appearance in February to tie in with the show's 30th anniversary celebrations. In October 2015, it was announced that Di Angelo would leave the show in early 2016. The character is arrested for attempted rape with his final scenes set in court airing on 4 and 5 February 2016. On 19 August 2016, Dean is acquitted of attempted rape after standing trial off-screen. On 30 October 2023, Di Angelo made an unannounced return as Dean. On 15 July 2024, it was announced Di Angelo had finished filming with the show and Dean departed on 4 September 2024.

Since returning in 2023, Dean's storylines have included going into business with Ian (Adam Woodyatt) and Cindy Beale (Michelle Collins), continuing to deny that he raped Linda Carter (Kellie Bright), building a relationship with his daughter Jade Masood (Elizabeth Green), a brief romance with Cindy's daughter Gina Knight (Francesca Henry), tampering with Jade's medication to prevent her from moving to Pakistan, blaming Jean Slater (Gillian Wright) for Jade's subsequent failing health, and being framed by Linda, Sharon Watts (Letitia Dean), Stacey Slater (Lacey Turner), Denise Fox (Diane Parish), Kathy Beale (Gillian Taylforth) and Suki Panesar (Balvinder Sopal) for the murder of Keanu Taylor (Danny Walters) on Christmas Day 2023 during The Six storyline. During his trial, Dean finally admitted to raping Linda which led to his exit from the show, after receiving a nine year prison sentence.

== Creation and development ==
=== Character creation ===
In September 2005, an official BBC press report announced the arrival of a new family of characters joining the soap early in 2006. The Wickses were an extension of Brian Wicks's (Leslie Schofield) family, a minor character that had appeared briefly in the 1980s as the second husband of the more prominent character Pat Butcher (Pam St Clement) and father of Simon Wicks (Nick Berry). The first of the trio of characters to arrive was Deano, played by Matt Di Angelo, branded by the press as a "heart-throb". Deano was described as "cocky, charismatic [with] an eye for the ladies and doesn't see anyone as out of his league". Di Angelo commented on his casting, "I can't wait to join EastEnders to play Deano. He's a combination of a young Alfie Moon (Shane Richie) and Del Boy (David Jason). He rates himself quite highly too so he's going to have lots of fun in the square."

Di Angelo began filming for the soap at the end of 2005 and was first seen on-screen as Deano in January 2006. The character was quickly joined in the soap's setting of Walford by his father Kevin Wicks (Phil Daniels) and sister Carly Wicks (Kellie Shirley). Executive producer Kate Harwood commented, "The Wicks family is going to be a force to be reckoned in Walford". The characters' introduction was branded by the press as an attempt to "spice up the show", following the announced departures of many popular and long-running characters, such as Sharon and Dennis Rickman (Letitia Dean and Nigel Harman), Chrissie Watts (Tracy-Ann Oberman), Kat and Alfie Moon (Jessie Wallace and Shane Richie), Sam Mitchell (Kim Medcalf), Johnny Allen (Billy Murray), Jake Moon (Joel Beckett) and Little Mo Mitchell (Kacey Ainsworth).

=== Storyline development ===
Following his introduction, the character was involved in few high-profile storylines until September 2006, when his estranged mother Shirley Carter (Linda Henry) was introduced in a special week of off-set episodes, filmed in Weymouth, Dorset. In the storyline, the Wicks family went on holiday and were traced by Shirley, who liaised with her unsuspecting children and, despite Kevin's best efforts, later revealed her true identity. The revelation was shown to have a negative effect on the Wicks family, in particular Deano who was involved in a car accident shortly afterwards and was hospitalised after driving recklessly. The storyline progressed further, when it transpired that Shirley was hiding a secret for Kevin, that he was not the biological father of Deano or Carly. When revealed, Deano was shown to "go off the rails". Commenting on the storyline, Di Angelo has said, "I don't think you can ever forget about things like that. But at the same time, Kevin's looked after him since he was a baby so why does that make him not his dad, just because he's not his biological father? In my view, your father is [the person] who looked after you since you were born." Describing his character's relationship with his mother Shirley in 2007, Di Angelo said, "I think he's very fond of his mum, he's a bit of a big kid. He's not the big tough guy, he's not aggressive and he's quite a placid guy. That's because he does have this longing for a mum that he never had [...] he'd like to get to know her".

=== Reintroduction and second departure ===
On 15 January 2014, it was announced Di Angelo would be returning to EastEnders. The actor started filming in February. Of his return to the show, Di Angelo commented, "It's such an exciting time for the show and the Carter/Wicks family that I just couldn't pass up the opportunity to reprise the role of Dean! I'm looking forward to getting back on the Square." Executive producer Dominic Treadwell-Collins added "Deano left angry with his mother. The Dean who returns is angrier. Dean returned on 11 April. "

During his time on the square, he formed a sexual relationship with Lauren Branning (Jacqueline Jossa) and performed sperm donation for Fiona "Tosh" Mackintosh (Rebecca Scroggs). On 31 August 2014, it was revealed that Dean would rape Linda Carter (Kellie Bright), after having developed an obsession for her in the months following his return. EastEnders bosses worked with charity Rape Crisis to develop the storyline, which took place in the week commencing on 6 October 2014. Dean's father Buster Briggs, played by Karl Howman, was introduced in mid November.

In October 2015, it was announced that Di Angelo would be leaving the show for a second time sometime in 2016. He made his final appearance on 5 February 2016.

=== Return (2023) ===
In October 2023, rumours that Di Angelo will reprise his role of Dean were reported after he was apparently pictured in a behind the scenes photograph. Dean made his return on 30 October 2023.

== Storylines ==
=== 2006–2008 ===
Deano as he appeared in 2006.

When Deano arrives in Walford in 2006, he persuades his great-aunt Pat Evans (Pam St Clement) to take him in and is soon joined by his stepfather Kevin Wicks (Phil Daniels) and sister Carly (Kellie Shirley). Deano causes trouble by spiking Stacey Slater's (Lacey Turner) alcohol with drugs and allowing Bradley Branning (Charlie Clements) to take the blame, stealing The Queen Victoria public house's bust and driving recklessly, crashing a car – behaviour prompted by the anniversary of his brother Jimbo's (Lloyd Richards) death. Deano is unwittingly reunited with his estranged mother, Shirley Carter (Linda Henry), during a family holiday in Dorset. Despite Kevin's efforts to stop her, Shirley makes herself known to Deano and Carly and eventually reveals that she is their mother. Deano struggles with this and after seeing Shirley behave promiscuously, he behaves recklessly and crashes a car at high-speed injuring himself, his passenger Chelsea Fox (Tiana Benjamin) and a pedestrian, Abi Branning (Lorna Fitzgerald). Deano nearly dies from his injuries but bonds with Shirley during his recovery. Kevin is opposed to this and during many arguments, the truth about Deano and Carly's paternity is revealed by Shirley: Kevin is not their biological father. Deano is devastated and threatens suicide by almost setting himself on fire but is stopped before going through with it.

Unlucky in love, Deano has sex with Stacey and has unrequited crushes on Dawn Swann (Kara Tointon) and Chelsea. Chelsea forces Deano into getting involved in a feud against Sean Slater (Robert Kazinsky). Deano tries to assault Sean but is conquered and battered. Chelsea and Deano swear revenge and frame Sean for the assault of Patrick Trueman (Rudolph Walker), stealing CCTV footage that would have exonerated him. Sean is imprisoned, but he gets revenge on Deano by having him attacked by a gang of thugs. When Carly finds the stolen CCTV footage featuring the real culprit, Craig Dixon (Rory Jennings), she gives it to the police and Sean is released. Deano and Chelsea are arrested for perverting the course of justice and released on bail. Sean attacks Deano again, flushing his head down a lavatory. Afraid of spending time in prison, Deano attempts to run away twice before his trial but eventually faces up to his responsibilities and is sentenced to six months imprisonment. He finds prison hard. On visits, his family discover that he is being bullied by the other prisoners and, after getting into trouble, he is denied early parole. Deano is permitted to attend Kevin's funeral under police supervision.

When Deano is released from prison, he has changed vastly, behaving in a morose manner having been traumatised by his incarceration. He brings a prostitute back to Shirley's flat and then forces his mother to pay for her services. He headbutts Sean and when Shirley says she wants to rebuild their relationship, Deano responds with exasperation, violently pinning her against a wall, shouting in her face, showing her his prison injuries, and stealing cash and jewellery from her. After rejecting his mother, Deano leaves Walford. In September 2012, Carly returns to Walford for two days and tells Shirley that Deano is doing well, owns a bar and lives with his girlfriend in Australia.

=== 2014–2016 ===
Dropping his former nickname, Dean returns to the UK and develops a relationship with his maternal grandfather, Stan Carter (Timothy West). He follows Stan back to Walford, opening a salon there named Blades, funded by Stan, and briefly dating Lauren Branning (Jacqueline Jossa). He acquaints himself with his mother's family, who now own The Queen Vic, but is unkind towards Shirley, verbally abusing her for her poor parenting, leading to Shirley's thought-to-be brother Mick Carter (Danny Dyer) punching him. Dean slowly bonds with his mother and begins to integrate into his newfound family. He is attracted to, then, later, obsessed with Mick's partner, Linda Carter (Kellie Bright), who maternally hugs him after Shirley hurts him by stealing from him because she owes Phil Mitchell (Steve McFadden). Dean breaks into Phil's house, reclaiming the money. Dean also gropes Linda's buttocks during a photoshoot at Blades. Although Dean helps clean Shirley up after she shoots Phil, Shirley's aunt Babe Smith (Annette Badland) refuses to let Shirley take Dean with them as she flees from the police, leaving Dean distraught. Linda comforts him and Dean attempts to have sex with her. When Linda protests, Dean rapes her. Linda tells no one about the ordeal but is mentally traumatised, more so when she discovers she is pregnant and fears that the baby is Dean's. Dean continues as if nothing has happened and begins dating Stacey after she moves into a flat shared with him. Stacey, herself a rape survivor, starts to notice Linda flinch whenever Dean is present and works out what has happened. She ends her relationship with Dean, throwing him out and refusing to believe his version of events: that sex with Linda had been consensual and that Linda's reaction stems from guilt. Stacey persuades Linda to tell Mick, which she finally does on Christmas Day 2014. Mick responds by pummelling Dean and is only stopped by Shirley's confession that Mick and Dean are, in fact, brothers. It transpires that Shirley is Mick's mother, not his sister, as he has grown up believing.

The revelations cause a split amongst the family, with Shirley and Stan siding with Dean and refusing to believe Linda. Fights occur between Dean and the Carters, culminating in Dean being arrested by the police for rape and being released on bail. When the community finds out what Dean is being accused of, his social life and business are ruined. He goes to stay with his sister, Carly, in York, but later returns and attempts to exact revenge on the Carters by breaking into The Queen Vic's cellar and trying to set it on fire. He is stopped by Mick, who assaults him so intensely that Mick's daughter, Nancy (Maddy Hill), fears her father has murdered Dean. When Dean's body goes missing from the cellar, Nancy suspects that Mick has disposed of Dean's body. However, Dean returns two months later in the company of Buster Briggs (Karl Howman), whom Shirley has recently revealed to be the biological father of both Dean and Mick. Buster announces that he has booked tickets to Greece for Dean, Shirley and himself to start a new life together. Not wanting a life as a fugitive for Dean, Shirley calls the police and informs them of his whereabouts and he is arrested for breaking his bail conditions. He is released weeks later, without charge, due to a lack of evidence and agrees to remain in Walford with his parents, despite being made a local pariah. After Linda gives birth, Dean insists the baby, Ollie, is his. However, Mick shares the baby's blood type while Dean does not, meaning Dean is not the father. Shortly after, Dean discovers that a one-night stand with Shabnam Masood (Rakhee Thakrar), years earlier, resulted in her becoming pregnant with his daughter, Roya Masood, renamed Jade Green (Amaya Edward). Shabnam claims that the baby died, not wanting Dean to know the child has been adopted, but Dean suspects she is lying. Dean confronts Shabnam at her engagement party, then has sex with Roxy Mitchell (Rita Simons). Shirley tells Dean that Jade has cystic fibrosis, leaving Dean infuriated that she lied. Devastated, Dean trashes Blades until Buster intervenes, then Shirley convinces him that Jade needs her father, so they carry out a DNA test to confirm paternity. He embarks on a relationship with Roxy. The DNA results prove Dean is the father. He reveals Jade's existence to a contemptuous Mick and Linda.

Linda rejects Dean when he offers to put the past behind them. Buster talks Dean out of trying for custody of Jade, so Shirley decides she will. Dean doesn't know how to relate to his daughter. Jade's visit is a disaster as Dean unknowingly reveals Jimbo died and she rushes out when she overhears. Mick takes her back. Her foster father tells Shirley and Buster they are unsuitable custodians. Roxy tells Dean she wants their relationship kept hidden, but when Roxy's sister Ronnie Mitchell (Samantha Womack) finds out, she forces Roxy to end it. However, they resume it again in secret, and Dean finds Ronnie's hidden spy camera, and sees Ronnie kissing Vincent Hubbard (Richard Blackwood). He deletes a message from Ronnie to Roxy. Dean's insecurity over Roxy's feelings for her missing brother-in-law, Charlie Cotton (Declan Bennett), leads him to burn her with hair straighteners, and later he cuts a chunk out of her hair. Dean proposes to Roxy to distance her from Ronnie's influence and then reveals to the Carters and Roxy that Ronnie tried to poison him. Dean and Roxy get engaged but when his anger causes her to get a cut on her face, she ends their relationship. Dean refuses to accept her decision and attempts to rape her, only prevented by Shirley's timely interruption. Roxy then flees for the police station, while Shirley attempts to drown Dean in the bath out of desperation, however she is unsuccessful and Dean strikes Shirley. During a heated argument with Linda over Roxy, Dean admits he raped Linda, then flees and hides. The next day, he arrives at Mick and Linda's wedding, where he attempts to kill Shirley by jumping into a lake with her. Mick saves them both, and the police arrive and arrest Dean for the attempted rape of Roxy. The following day, a letter arrives for Shirley from Dean, asking her to visit. Shirley and Buster both visit Dean in prison – where he tells them he needs help getting a good lawyer with the money from Blades. However, Shirley and Buster instead make it clear to Dean they do not want any further contact with him, and Buster warns Dean he knows people in prison who could make his life hell. One month later, Shirley hears that Dean has his plea hearing so visits him, urging him to plead guilty, threatening to disown him if he does not. However, in court, he pleads not guilty, but, as he has failed to surrender to bail previously, he is remanded in custody until his trial. In August 2016, off-screen, Dean is acquitted of attempted rape, due to lack of evidence, and Buster pays him off, warning him not to return to Walford again.

After Mick disappears and is presumed dead on Christmas Day 2022, Shirley decides to stay with Carly and her grandson. Off-screen, she also reunites with Dean when staying with Carly and it is revealed through a social media photo posted by Carly which Linda sees in February 2023, leaving her horrified.

=== 2023–2024 ===
In October 2023, Cindy Beale (Michelle Collins) tells her partner Ian Beale (Adam Woodyatt) that she has gone into business with a man who previously lived in Walford. This is revealed to be Dean and Cindy is shocked when Ian informs her of Dean's rape crimes. Dean sneaks into The Queen Vic kitchen, horrifying Linda. He tells her that Jade is awaiting a lung transplant due to her cystic fibrosis and he therefore needs to stay near her and Shabnam. Linda refuses to believe Dean and confronts Ian and Cindy for going into business with him. Ian and Cindy attempt to end their partnership with Dean, but he refuses. Whitney Dean (Shona McGarty) confirms from Shabnam that Jade is indeed ill and informs Linda. Dean moves into the brewery apartments and tries to reacquaint himself with residents, including his former stepsister Chelsea (now Zaraah Abrahams), but is rejected. After a series of harassments, Dean confronts Linda in The Queen Vic and is punched by her mother Elaine Peacock's (Harriet Thorpe) fiancé, George Knight (Colin Salmon), causing him to fall down the stairs. Dean decides to press charges against George for assault, but in a bid to stop George from going to prison, Linda agrees to Dean's proposition that she retracts her allegations that he raped her. However, she is unaware that Dean has taped it. Jade (now played by Elizabeth Green) returns to Walford to spend time with Dean. They initially struggle to bond and their brief bliss is ruined when Linda and Keanu Taylor (Danny Walters) reveal Dean's history of rape in front of Jade. Jade decides she wants nothing to do with Dean and leaves Walford. As revenge, Dean decides to play Linda's false confession in The Queen Vic, but no one believes him. He later publicly announces he is dating Cindy and George's daughter Gina Knight (Francesca Henry), shocking Linda. Cindy offers Dean money to sell his shares of Beales Eels to her and Ian, and to leave Gina and Walford. Dean refuses and continues seeing Gina. However Gina discovers Dean's true colours when he reveals his misogyny, and she dumps him. Jade soon returns to Walford and moves in with Dean. They bond well, but Dean is livid when Jade announces that she plans to move to Pakistan with Shabnam. In order to prevent this, he tampers with her medication so Jade will be too ill to go.

When Jade decides to do a charity auction for cystic fibrosis patients, she receives assistance from Jean Slater (Gillian Wright). When Jean can't find a venue for the auction, Linda grants her permission to hold it in the Queen Vic, provided Dean will not come. Jean agrees, but Dean arrives anyway with Jade on an oxygen cylinder. Dean is furious when Jade mentions moving to Pakistan again and he secretly pulls out her oxygen tube and leaves. As a result, Jade faints. Pretending to be oblivious, Dean rushes Jade to the hospital and Jean follows him there. She is suspicious when Dean refuses to show Jade's doctor her medication. Jean confronts Dean who lies that the discrepancies in the medication are due to Jade wanting to take them herself and doing so incorrectly. Jean is momentarily pacified, but her suspicions are heightened when Jade arrives home from the hospital and tells Jean that Dean is the one who has been administering her medication. Jean confronts Dean again but is stunned when Dean blames her for Jade's ill health and asks Jean why she has been hurting Jade.

Unbeknownst to Dean, Linda is trying to cover up the fact that she murdered Keanu on Christmas Day 2023, and has helped bury his body underneath the cafe floor. When the floor collapses, Keanu's body is discovered. Although Sharon Watts (Letitia Dean) is initially arrested for the crime, Stacey suggests to the others that since Dean never faced justice for what he did to Linda and Roxy, framing him for Keanu's murder would give him a semblance of comeuppance. She plants the meat thermometer, which was used to kill Keanu, in Dean's flat while Linda makes a false statement to the police that she saw Dean drag what has turned out to be Keanu's body into the cafe at Christmas. She is able to convince DCI Peter Arthurs (Ian Burfield) by revealing that Dean raped her nearly a decade ago and she has been terrified of him ever since. Arthurs arrives on the square and subsequently arrests Dean while Sharon is released. Dean insists that he is being framed, but the meat thermometer is found in Dean's flat and the fact that he booked a flight to New York with no return is also used against him. Jean and Harvey tell Jade that Dean was the one tampering with her medication. They inform the police and are corroborated by Jade. Arthurs also arrests Dean for neglect and he is charged with Keanu's murder. During the trial, Dean finally publicly admits the rape but stresses he is innocent of Keanu's murder. He is then sentenced to nine years imprisonment, following his confession.

== Reception ==
For his role as Dean, Di Angelo was longlisted for "Best Villain" at the 2024 Inside Soap Awards.

In February 2025, Radio Times ranked Dean as the 9th best EastEnders villain, with Laura Denby writing that his rape of Linda cemented him as "one of the biggest offenders of the genre".
