= Luisa Bradshaw-White =

British actress (born 1974)

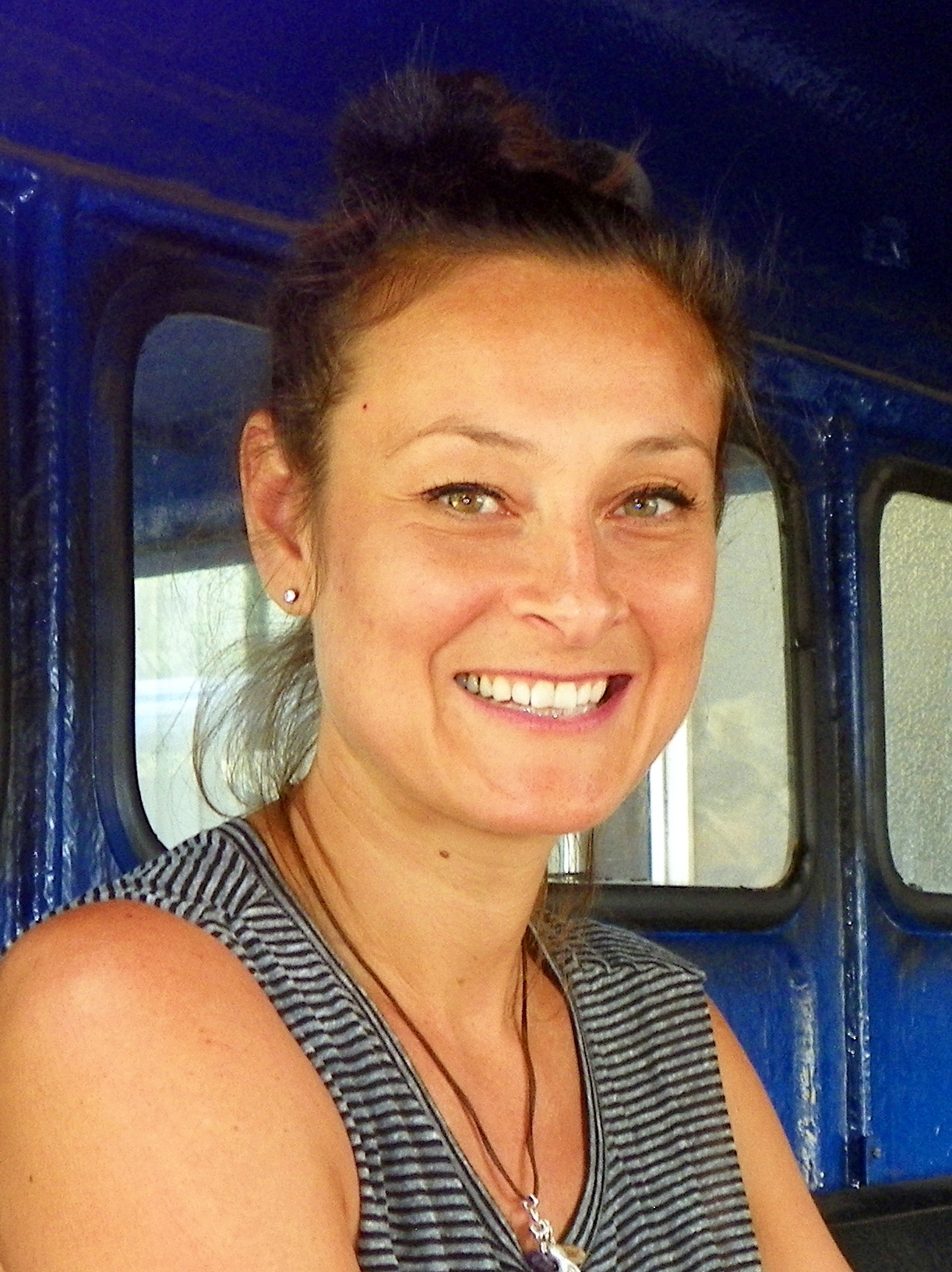
- Bradshaw-White in 2016
- Born: 9 December 1974 (age 51); Eastcote, London, England
- Education: Haydon School
- Occupation: Actress
- Years active: 1988–2021
- Spouse: Annette Yeo (m. 2015)
- Children: 2

Luisa Bradshaw-White (born 9 December 1974) is an English former actress. She is known for her roles in many British television series, including Grange Hill as Maria Watts, This Life as Kira, Bad Girls as Lorna Rose, Holby City as Lisa Fox, and an eight-year run in EastEnders as Tina Carter which was her final role.

== Career ==
Bradshaw-White played Maria Watts in the BBC children's programme Grange Hill (1991–1994). She went on to act in several other television programmes including The Brittas Empire (1997); London's Burning (2001), A Touch of Frost (1997), the ITV police drama The Bill (1995; 1996; 1997), Birds of a Feather (1997; 1998), and Lorna Rose in Bad Girls in 1999.

In 1996, she played Kira in the BBC drama This Life. Film credits include Wonderful World (1998), The Escort, A Friendship in Vienna and playing Evita (the Hostess) in Mauvaise Passe (1999). Other television credits include roles in Big Bad World (1999); Bad Girls (1999) and Meaningful Sex (2000). She played nurse Lisa Fox in the BBC hospital drama Holby City (2001–2005).

Stage credits include Godspell (2001), Solitary Confinement, The Shagaround and playing Lady Anne in Richard III (1998). In 1997, Bradshaw-White along with fellow This Life cast member Ramon Tikaram (who played Ferdy) were invited by Elton John to appear in his music video for the song "Something About the Way You Look Tonight". On 18 November 2013, Bradshaw-White made her first appearance in the BBC soap opera EastEnders as the younger sister of established character Shirley Carter (Linda Henry). In October 2020, it was announced that she would be leaving the programme with her final scenes airing on 28 December 2020 when she was killed off by Gray Atkins (Toby-Alexander Smith).

== Personal life ==
Bradshaw-White came out as gay when she was 19. She is married and has children.

== Filmography ==
Year	Title	Role	Notes
1988	A Friendship in Vienna	Herte	Television film
1991–1994	Grange Hill	Maria Watts	Main role
1995	The Bill	Shelley Bates	Episode: "Old Habitats"
1995	Faith in the Future	Groupie	Episode: "Food of Love"
1996–1997	This Life	Kira	Main role
1996	The Bill	Judy Killick	Episode: "Known to Someone"
1997	The Brittas Empire	Angie	Episode: "Exposed"
1997	A Touch of Frost	Joanna Lawson	Episode: "No Other Love"
1997	The Bill	Paula Davies	Episode: "Force"
1997–1998	Birds of a Feather	Dawn	Episodes: "Reservoir Birds" and "Nuptials"
1998	Wonderful World	Natalie	Short film
1998	Grafters	Debbie	1 episode
1999	Big Bad World	Samantha	3 episodes
1999	Bad Girls	Lorna Rose	Main role; 7 episodes
1999	The Escort	Evita the Hostess	Feature film
2000	In Defence	Jackie Ellmann	1 episode
2000	Meaningful Sex	Sadie	Short film
2001	London's Burning	Lynne Bailey	1 episode
2001–2005	Holby City	Lisa Fox	Regular role; 130 episodes
2005	Casualty@Holby City	Lisa Fox	Episode: "Something We Can Do"
2011	Doctors	Hannah Hampson	Episode: "Pretending to See the Future"
2012	Homefront	Nicki	2 episodes
2013–2021	EastEnders	Tina Carter	Regular role; 673 episodes
2020	EastEnders: Secrets from the Square	Herself	Episode: "Shirley and Tina"
2021	Loose Women	Guest panellist	1 episode

== Awards and nominations ==
Year	Award	Category	Result	Ref.
2014	Inside Soap Awards	Funniest Female	Nominated	
2015	Inside Soap Awards	Funniest Female	Nominated	
2018	Inside Soap Awards	Best Actress	Nominated	
