= Zainab Masood =

Fictional character from EastEnders

- EastEnders character
- Portrayed by: Nina Wadia
- Duration: 2007–2013
- First appearance: Episode 3400; 16 July 2007
- Last appearance: Episode 4584; 8 February 2013
- Created by: Diederick Santer
- Introduced by: Diederick Santer
- Spin-off appearances: EastEnders: E20 (2010–2011)
- Crossover appearances: East Street (2010)
In-universe information
- Other names: Zainab Khan
- Occupation: Post office owner; Caterer; Restaurateur; Shop assistant
- Husband: Yusef Khan (backstory, 2011); Masood Ahmed (until 2011)
- Sons: Syed Masood; Tamwar Masood; Kamil Masood
- Daughters: Shabnam Masood
- Stepdaughters: Afia Masood
- Grandsons: Zaair Kazemi
- Granddaughters: Yasmin Masood; Jade Masood
- First cousins: Haroon

Zainab Masood (also Khan) is a character from the BBC soap opera EastEnders, played by Nina Wadia. She made her first appearance on 16 July 2007. Zainab is the mother of Syed (Marc Elliott), Shabnam (Zahra Ahmadi), Tamwar (Himesh Patel) and Kamil Masood (Arian Chikhlia). She is the wife of Masood Ahmed (Nitin Ganatra), who divorces her, and of Yusef Khan (Ace Bhatti), whom she remarries after a divorce decades earlier, and who abuses her in both of their marriages. Wadia quit her role in 2012 and departed the series in the episode shown on 8 February 2013.

== Character creation ==
=== Background ===
Zainab Masood was one of several British Asian characters introduced in 2007 by the executive producer of EastEnders, Diederick Santer. She made her first appearance in July 2007 as "a strong-willed woman in her early 40s who owns a string of post offices". Zainab was the first member of the Masood family introduced. The rest of her family, including Masood Ahmed, Shabnam Masood, Syed Masood and Tamwar Masood (Zainab's husband, daughter and two sons), have since joined the programme. The Masoods (without Syed) moved to a property on Albert Square in October 2007, and became regular characters. The Masoods were the first Muslim family to join the show since the Karims, who appeared between 1987 and 1990, and they were the first Asian family to be introduced since the unsuccessful Ferreira family in 2003. Panned by critics and viewers, the Ferreiras were dismissed as unrealistic by the Asian community in the UK, and were eventually axed in 2005.

The introduction of more ethnic minority characters was part of producer Diederick Santer's plan to "diversify", to make EastEnders "feel more 21st century". Prior to 2007, EastEnders was heavily criticised by the Commission for Racial Equality (CRE), for not representing the East End's real "ethnic make-up". It was suggested that the average proportion of visible minority faces on EastEnders was substantially lower than the actual ethnic minority population in East London boroughs, and it therefore reflected the East End in the 1960s, not the East End of the 2000s. Furthermore, it was suggested that an element of "tokenism" and stereotyping surrounded many of the minority characters in EastEnders. The expansion of minority representation in EastEnders provides "more opportunities for audience identification with its characters, hence a wider appeal." Trevor Phillips, CRE chair, has said: "balanced representation of ethnic minority communities in the media matters. The industry has a key part to play in this, it is a powerful tool and can go a long way towards helping to build an integrated society."

=== Casting ===
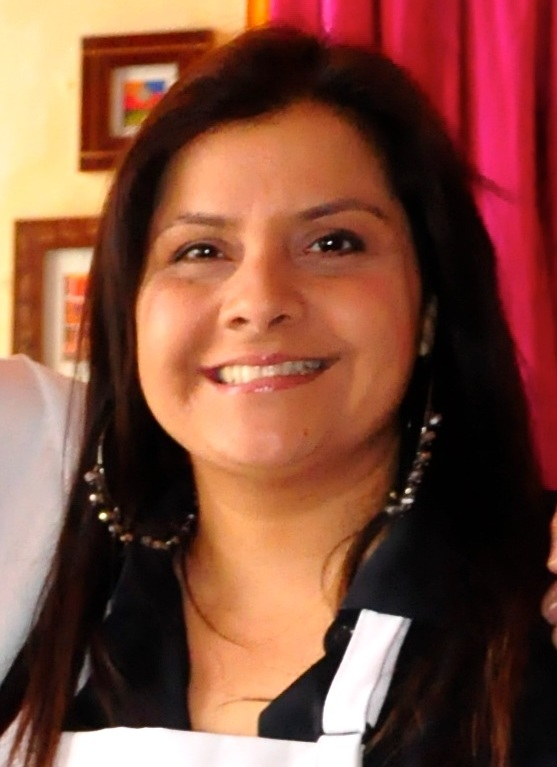
Nina Wadia (pictured) originally auditioned to play Gita Kapoor before landing the role of Zainab.

Actress and comedian, Nina Wadia—best known for starring in the sketch show Goodness Gracious Me—was approached and subsequently cast in the role of Zainab. This was Wadia's second role in EastEnders. She had previously played a nurse, who tended to Michelle Fowler after she was shot in 1994. She had also auditioned for the role of Gita Kapoor, but lost the part to Shobu Kapoor. Wadia has commented: "I'm thrilled to join the show and I can't wait for Zainab to come to the Square and cause some trouble." "It's so nice to come to work and have some adult conversation, as at home I spend most of my day chatting to a three-year-old or my three-and-a-half-month-old baby." EastEnders executive producer, Diederick Santer, added: "I'm enormously excited to welcome Nina Wadia to EastEnders. She's a brilliant comedy actress and I'm sure her character Zainab will showcase all her comic and dramatic talents."

=== Personality ===
Zainab is portrayed as a "tough-talking businesswoman". Described as "Walford's answer to Sir Alan Sugar", Zainab has a "direct manner" with "a tongue that could cut glass", which can be "hugely intimidating". This became evident shortly after the character's introduction, when Zainab become embroiled in an ongoing feud with her employee Denise Wicks (Diane Parish). An EastEnders spokesperson has commented: "[Zainab's] not there to make friends".

Despite her "fierce manner", Zainab is a "devoted mother", and she is also described as "great fun" with a "wicked sense of humour." Wadia has said that Zainab's relationship with her husband, Masood (Nitin Ganatra), allows for her character to show a "softer side". She adds "with him, you will get to see her smile!". Santer also said that she will be the new battle-axe on the show (replacing Pauline Fowler) — the "Asian" matriarch of the Square. Wadia later described Zainab as someone she would not want to meet in real life: "I constantly say on set, 'I annoy myself' when I play Zainab. She's really irritating — the kind of woman that I'd never want to meet. I was on holiday last week, I went up to the Lake District, and every place that I stopped, people came up to me and said, 'Oh, you made me laugh last night'. One woman said to me, 'My husband screams at the television screen when you come on!' and I know then that I'm doing my job." Wadia later said "Zainab is quite the bitch, isn't she? I certainly wouldn't want to meet her in a dark alley at night, but she is such good fun to play."

Wadia has also said that Zainab is the more traditional of the Masood family but is also conflicted: "She's the more devout Muslim, even though she was married when she was younger to another man before falling in love with Masood. [...] Being in this country at the age she's at, she has her traditional values but she fights terribly to be modern and to fit into Western society. Look at the way she dresses for a start. She only wears the traditional clothes when it's to her advantage, like if she has to meet the imam. So she does play the game, but deep down, Zainab's someone who'll come across as traditional but inside, she's a free spirit. That's what makes her so angry and conflicted, because she's constantly fighting herself."

== Development ==
=== Pregnancy ===
In August 2009, Zainab is forced come to terms with the fact that she is 15 weeks pregnant in her mid-40s. Zainab and Masood are ready to settle down as Shabnam has left home, Tamwar is going to university and Syed is preparing for marriage. An EastEnders source told entertainment website Digital Spy: "Zainab's in her mid-40s and was looking forward to spending some quality time with Masood, but the news certainly throws a spanner in the works. Their plans to see the world instantly fall apart and she faces a dilemma as to what to do." Wadia said she cried on hearing about the storyline, saying that she was not looking forward to wearing a pregnancy suit: "From a purely aesthetic point of view, the thought of having to come in early to put on foam and then sweat while filming... I get very hot on set and we have to pretend that it's winter before it is, so we have to wear extra clothing. Just the thought of it made me cry! Because I'm quite a new mum in real life, to have to have kids at work as well also made me tear up!" The storyline also includes EastEnders' first scenes filmed in a mosque, which Wadia said was "huge" and "stunning". She said that Zainab is terrified due to her age and the fact it will interfere with her career, and she feels trapped because she does not want the baby but abortion is forbidden by her faith, adding "At this point, though, she's questioning whether she should go against her faith and abort. That's a huge thing for her." Finally Wadia said that she feels Zainab will be a "very funny mother".

=== Domestic violence ===
In late 2011, Zainab reunites with her former husband Yusef. After months of manipulating Zainab, Yusef manages to marry her. A short-time before the marriage, Yusef begins abusing Zainab mentally and physically. He starts to confine her to the house uses Zainab's son Kamil to control her. Wadia explains that she wants the storyline to have a positive impact against real-life violence. She told BBC News :"I think the idea behind showing a strong woman like Zainab changing like this is to show that it can happen to even the strongest of women. They can change and they can be manipulated - especially if they're isolated from their friends and family. The manipulator can take advantage, so it's to prove that it can even happen to people like her. To be honest, if even one woman rings that Action Line at the end of the show and there's some difference made to her life, I'll feel like we've done our job," she continued. "It is a serious issue and I'm glad it's being highlighted. I hope that it wakes anyone up - not just women, I know that there are abused men out there as well. So if it gives anyone the strength to leave a relationship like that, we'll have done our job."

Wadia admitted that she was feeling "emotionally drained" from her scenes with Ace Bhatti. She told The People: "It's very draining. I'm putting myself into this very dark place which I know sadly is a reality for so many women. Zainab's confidence has been steadily eroded. She's feeling isolated and has fallen under Yusef's control. He wants revenge. She is totally in his power. I had to show this can happen to any woman, no matter how strong she seems. Zainab was strong and not naive, but a woman is vulnerable if the man hits the right psychological weak spots. But both Ace and I have found it hard to do. I've known Ace for a long time and we're good friends. He has been wonderful to work with on this and very concerned about me all the way through." Wadia has been given advice on the storyline from the Roshni refuge in Birmingham, which specializes in abuse within Asian families.

Wadia warns that Yusef will get worse as time goes on. Wadia told Inside Soap: "I was filming out on location recently with Ace and a bunch of women came over to him and said, 'God, you're such a horrible man!' It's funny because Ace is such a sweet man - and you haven't even seen the worst of Yusef yet!" Wadia continued: "Let's just say that what happens is the complete opposite of what you want to see. Zainab and Yusef share a dark and twisted love, and she definitely has feelings for him. It's not true and pure like what she used to have with Masood - and if Yusef manages to get her back to Pakistan, it will be the end for her. I wouldn't be surprised if Zainab ends up in some sort of home to recover from everything that's going to happen."

=== Departure ===
On 16 December 2012, Susan Hill from the Daily Star reported that Wadia had quit her role. Zainab left the show 8 February 2013. Wadia had not expected the news story to break, so went on Twitter to put the story in her own words, saying that playing Zainab had been "a gift and a privilege", adding "I'll always be hugely proud of the talented friends I've worked with... And I'm so grateful for the special bond with our audience who watch, care and talk to us every day. We're a family of millions... Letting go of something you love is never easy but the time has come to move on and every ending brings a new beginning... Here's to future loves." The remaining members of the Masood family are to stay on EastEnders, despite Zainab's exit and the separation of her and Masood. The show's producer Lorraine Newman stated that "For the past five years Nina has brought to life the wonderful Zainab—the formidable, fun-loving, opinionated, fiercely competitive matriarch. Nina's range as an actor is quite exceptional, from her comedic double acts right through to her ability to pull on our heart strings with incredibly moving drama. We are very sad to be losing Nina and wish her well in ventures new. She will be missed by the production as much as the audience."

Wadia has since said she would return if she was asked by producers, saying: "I miss EastEnders a lot, but after doing it for five and a half years it was time for me to go back to comedy and have a bit of a change. But if they asked me I would love to go back. I asked to be killed off, because I wanted a big story end. But they didn't want to kill the character, which was much loved by the audience. They didn't want me to go. I love that show and it did a lot to my career. I will always be thankful to EastEnders and if they asked me to, I would absolutely go back for a bit."

== Storylines ==
=== Backstory ===
Born and raised in Pakistan, Zainab brought shame upon her family when she had an affair with Masood Ahmed (Nitin Ganatra), while married to Yusef Khan (Ace Bhatti). As punishment, Zainab was set on fire by Yusef and his family. Masood rescued her and she divorced her husband to marry Masood, joining him in the UK, where they had three children, Syed (Marc Elliott), Shabnam (Zahra Ahmadi/Rakhee Thakrar) and Tamwar (Himesh Patel). Family members still treated Zainab with contempt, however, particularly her brother-in-law Inzamam Ahmed (Paul Bhattacharjee). Inzamam pestered her to sleep with him for years: he considered her a "fallen woman". The Masoods ran their own business until 2004, when Syed stole from the family, nearly bankrupting them. Masood initially took the blame and banished him from their lives to save Zainab's feelings. The Masoods decided on a career change, working in the postal service.

=== 2007–2013 ===
Zainab arrives as the owner of Walford's Post Office, clashing with employee Denise Wicks (Diane Parish) immediately, though they later become friends. The post office flounders in debt, and Zainab turns to Inzamam for a loan, but he wants sex in return for the money, which disgusts her, and Masood banishes Inzamam from his life when he discovers what his brother has done. Despite the Masoods' best efforts, they are forced to close the post office. The Masoods attempt to turn their fortunes around, starting a catering business. Ian Beale (Adam Woodyatt) invests £2000 and the company merges with Ian and Christian Clarke's (John Partridge) catering company, becoming Masala Queen, with Zainab elected manager. Problems emerge when money goes missing and Zainab suspects Masood, thinking he has done this before. Tamwar admits to taking the money, lending it to his older brother, Syed. Masood reveals that Syed's actions are why he was banished from the family; he stole money from the family business and is continuing to do so. Despite this, Zainab contacts Syed and after reconciling with Masood, Syed moves to Albert Square and is joined by his fiancé Amira Shah (Preeya Kalidas). Zainab plans an extravagant wedding for Syed but she grows suspicious of the way Christian acts around him, and is incensed to discover they are having a homosexual relationship. Zainab orders Syed to marry Amira regardless, which he does. Zainab gives birth to another son, Kamil, in 2010, but the family's joy is short-lived as Amira discovers Syed's affair with Christian, and Syed comes out as gay. Amira leaves, and Christian's sister, Jane Beale (Laurie Brett), reveals to Masood that Zainab knew about the affair since before the wedding. Masood and Zainab argue; he packs her belongings and physically throws her out. When the couple reconcile, they cut-off ties to their son, unable to accept his relationship with Christian.

Tamwar starts seeing Afia Khan (Meryl Fernandes) and her father, Yusef, turns up and shocks Zainab as he is her ex-husband, whose family set her on fire. Tamwar is forbidden from seeing Afia, but disobeys his parents, and invites her to the opening of his parents' restaurant, Argee Bhajee. Zainab is forced to accept the Khans into her family when Tamwar announces he is marrying Afia. Yusef, who moves to Walford as the new GP, attempts to reconcile with Zainab, suggesting that he was not involved when his family set her on fire in Pakistan. He offers her money so she can pay off debts, and supports her through marital difficulties with Masood; Zainab begins to soften towards Yusef and in doing so she grows distant from Masood. Yusef manipulates Zainab, drugging her and causing her to pass out; she is hospitalised, with her family believing she took a deliberate overdose in a suicide bid. Concerned that he is causing Zainab's problems and that she is in love with Yusef, Masood divorces her by saying the triple talaq.

Vulnerable, Zainab agrees to reunite with Yusef and accepts his marriage proposal; he continues to manipulate her, becoming violent towards her. Afia discovers that Yusef did start the blaze that burned Zainab in Pakistan; she demands he either tell Zainab the truth, or she will. Yusef confesses to Zainab, who is angry, but she eventually decides the future is what matters and marries him anyway. Yusef turns nasty, suggesting Zainab should give Kamil to Masood, as he sees him as an outcast. When Zainab slaps Yusef, he slaps Zainab back. Yusef then hastily arranges to take Zainab and Kamil to Pakistan, and when Zainab tries to postpone this, Yusef kidnaps and threatens Kamil, forcing Zainab to do his bidding. Yusef violently beats Zainab when he discovers that she has been liaising with Masood in an attempt to escape him. Zainab says she would rather die than go with Yusef to Pakistan; she considers jumping from the window, but instead hits Yusef in the groin and escapes, while Masood retrieves Kamil from Yusef's relative. The police are called, but Afia allows Yusef to escape. Yusef confronts Masood at the B&B he is staying at during a Christmas party. He tries to kill Masood by starting a fire which engulfs the B&B. When Zainab sees a gloating Yusef, she deceives him into thinking Afia is trapped in the fire. Yusef enters the burning building to save Afia, but to Zainab's distress, so does Tamwar. Yusef is killed by the fire and although Masood and Tamwar escape, Tamwar is severely burnt, requiring skin grafts. In the wake of this, a reunited Zainab and Masood help Tamwar through recovery, but Zainab's guilt eventually forces her to confess that Tamwar's scars and Yusef's death are her fault. The following upset ultimately causes Tamwar and Afia's marriage to break down, and she leaves him. Despite initial upset, the family overcome the trauma, and Zainab finally accepts Syed and Christian as a couple, welcoming them both back into her family. Masood later proposes to Zainab. Zainab takes money from Kamil and Tamwar's trust funds to lend to Syed for his debts. Syed causes the family lose the restaurant because he has not paid the mortgage, and Masood finds out that Zainab took the money so asks her to leave because she promised never to lie after Yusef.

Zainab returns and she and Masood reconcile, setting a date for their wedding. Zainab's friend Ayesha Rana (Shivani Ghai) stays with them so she can get to know her suitor, Rashid Kayani (Gurpreet Singh), but Zainab tries to get her to date Tamwar instead. This does not work, and Ayesha develops a crush on Masood. Zainab and Denise both apply for the same job at the Minute Mart. Zainab is angry to discover that Masood's brother AJ Ahmed (Phaldut Sharma) has informed the interviewer (Jonathan Sidgwick) that she has short-term memory loss. However, AJ and Zainab later apologise to each other via a note. Neither Zainab nor Denise get the job. Zainab buys an expensive water feature so that her neighbours will not think the family is poor, and she appears to care more about that than Masood. When the water feature is sabotaged by Tiffany Butcher (Maisie Smith) and Morgan Butcher (Devon Higgs), Zainab blames Masood, who smashes the water feature in frustration. Masood later tells Zainab he is unhappy in their relationship and calls off their wedding. Zainab says she has always loved Masood over their marriage, but admits to her sins. She and Kamil then leave, returning to Pakistan.

In December 2013, it is revealed that Zainab is in a relationship with her cousin, Haroon, and they are planning to get engaged. However, Shabnam returns to Walford the following month, and tells Masood that their relationship has ended. In August 2015, Zainab is unable to return from Pakistan for Shabnam's planned wedding to Kush Kazemi (Davood Ghadami). When they do marry in November, Zainab cannot attend, but Masood convinces her to send Kamil to attend the wedding, so Zainab can have a break from motherhood. Masood later tells Tamwar that Zainab has been planning on cutting off all ties to her family for a while. When prodded by Tamwar, Masood calls Zainab and refuses her access to Kamil unless she comes back to Walford to collect him herself. In April 2016, Zainab telephones Masood to say she is getting married in Pakistan and she wants Tamwar and Kamil to attend, though Tamwar and Masood agree they should not go, as she has not been there for them. Masood later learns that Zainab's husband has left her and is divorcing her. After much persuasion from girlfriend Belinda Peacock (Carli Norris), Masood calls and comforts Zainab. Eventually, he and Kamil leave Walford and fly over to Pakistan so that Kamil can be with his mother in her time of need. In 2024, Zainab falls ill and Shabnam plans to move to Pakistan with her daughter Jade Masood (Elizabeth Green) to care for her.

== Other appearances ==
Zainab also makes cameo appearances in the Internet spin-off series EastEnders: E20. In episode 1 of series 1, Zsa Zsa Carter (Emer Kenny) runs past her, then Andy (Steve North), who is chasing Zsa Zsa, runs into her. In episode 3 of series 2, she attends a dance class run by a man named Roger (Eddie Elliott), but assumes Asher Levi (Heshima Thompson) is Roger as Roger is late. When Roger arrives, Asher runs off with the money and Zainab finds him, telling him to keep the money but advising him to stick to dancing rather than stealing. She also appeared in series 3.

== Reception ==
Zainab, along with the rest of the Masood family, was criticised by actor Deepak Verma, who played Sanjay Kapoor between 1993 and 1998. He said that EastEnders had failed to portray Asian families in a realistic manner, branding the family "two-dimensional and ill-conceived". A BBC spokesperson responded by saying "It's a shame Deepak feels that way but that's clearly his personal opinion. The Masood family have proved to be hugely popular with EastEnders viewers."

EastEnders was criticised by Location, Location, Location host Kirstie Allsopp for a scene broadcast on 1 January 2010, in which Zainab told gay Christian Clarke, "Take your perverted obsession elsewhere. What you do makes me feel sick." Allsop said the scene was "totally unsuitable for 6.30pm" and added "I don't want kids watching that kind of rant – in time they'll know about bigots but please not yet." The BBC responded by saying "Since this storyline began, EastEnders has always shown a balance of opinions to ensure that we capture the many different views of the characters involved. Zainab has always been an extremely opinionated character but her views do not go unchallenged and it is within these conflicts that the drama unfolds. We have taken great care in portraying this sensitive storyline and we always ensure that our episodes are suitable for the timeslot in which they are shown".

In March 2011, Wadia was nominated for the second year running in the British Soap Award for Best Actress category at The British Soap Awards. She was shortlisted for the same award in 2013 in addition to "Best Actress" for the 2013 Inside Soap Awards. In 2020, Sara Wallis and Ian Hyland from The Daily Mirror placed Zainab 42nd on their ranked list of the Best EastEnders characters of all time, calling her a "Demanding matriarch" who had a "rocky" marriage to Masood.

== See also ==
- List of EastEnders: E20 characters
- List of fictional postal employees
