= Masood Ahmed =

Fictional character from EastEnders

- EastEnders character
- Portrayed by: Nitin Ganatra
- Duration: 2007–2019
- First appearance: Episode 3453; 16 October 2007
- Last appearance: Episode 5871; 19 February 2019
- Created by: Diederick Santer
- Introduced by: Diederick Santer (2007); John Yorke (2017)
- Spin-off appearances: EastEnders: E20 (2010–2011); The Walford Apprentice (2012); Tamwar Tales – The Life of an Assistant Market Inspector (2013)
- Crossover appearances: East Street (2010)
In-universe information
- Occupation: Postman; Caterer; Minicab driver; Restaurateur; Teaching assistant; Market trader; Chip shop assistant
- Brothers: Inzamam Ahmed; AJ Ahmed
- Wife: Zainab Khan (until 2011)
- Sons: Syed Masood; Tamwar Masood; Kamil Masood
- Daughters: Shabnam Masood
- Grandsons: Zaair Kazemi
- Granddaughters: Yasmin Masood; Jade Masood
- Uncles: Arshad Ahmed
- Nephews: Ali Inzamam
- Nieces: Jamila Inzamam
- Other relatives: Iqra Ahmed; Habiba Ahmed; Tyrion Ahmed

Masood Ahmed is a fictional character from the BBC soap opera EastEnders, played by Nitin Ganatra. The character made his first appearance in episode 3452, first broadcast in the United Kingdom on 16 October 2007. Masood was introduced as part of the Masood family, a Pakistani-Muslim family gradually introduced across 2007 as part of plans to "diversify" the serial. This marked Ganatra's first role in soap opera and he was "nervous but excited" about joining the serial. His problematic marriage to Zainab Masood (Nina Wadia), who he had previously starred alongside, served as a key storyline for the character throughout his tenure. Early storylines for the character include bankruptcy and struggling to accept his son Syed Masood's (Marc Elliott) homosexuality. Wadia and Ganatra received positive reception from viewers and critics and were nominated for several awards.

In 2011, the interference of Zainab's ex-husband Yusef Khan (Ace Bhatti) led to the end of Masood's marriage to Zainab, and he begins a relationship with Jane Beale (Laurie Brett). Masood later begins dating Carol Jackson (Lindsey Coulson), which develops into a love triangle following the return of Carol's former partner, David Wicks (Michael French). The character has since entered into relationships with Carmel Kazemi (Bonnie Langford), Belinda Peacock (Carli Norris) and Kathy Beale (Gillian Taylforth).

Ganatra's departure was announced on 1 September 2016, becoming the last member of the Masood family to leave. Masood made his departure in episode 5388, broadcast on 17 November 2016. In October 2017, it was announced that Masood would be returning to the show full-time, along with members of his extended family. He made a brief appearance on 28 November 2017 and returned permanently on 1 January 2018. On 26 January 2019, it was announced Ganatra had quit the soap again and Masood departed in episode 5871, originally broadcast on 19 February 2019, when Masood left Albert Square to live in Australia.

== Creation ==
=== Background ===
Masood was one of several Asian characters introduced in 2007 by executive producer Diederick Santer. He was first seen in October 2007 as Walford's new postman. Masood was the fourth character in the Masood family to make an appearance on-screen, joining his wife Zainab Masood (Nina Wadia) and daughter Shabnam Masood (Zahra Ahmadi) who appeared in July 2007, and his son Tamwar Masood (Himesh Patel) who appeared in October 2007. They are later joined in 2009 by their eldest son Syed (Marc Elliott). The Masoods were the first Muslim family to join the show since the Karims, who appeared between 1987 and 1990, and they were the first Asian family to be introduced since the unsuccessful Ferreira family in 2003. Panned by critics and viewers, the Ferreiras were dismissed as unrealistic by the Asian community in the UK, and were eventually axed in 2005.

The introduction of more ethnic minority characters is part of Santer's plan to "diversify", to make EastEnders "feel more 21st century". Prior to 2007, EastEnders was heavily criticised by the Commission for Racial Equality (CRE), for not representing the East End's real "ethnic make-up". It was suggested that the average proportion of visible minority faces on EastEnders was substantially lower than the actual ethnic minority population in East London boroughs, and it therefore reflected the East End in the 1960s, not the East End of the 2000s. Furthermore, it was suggested that an element of "tokenism" and stereotyping surrounded many of the minority characters in EastEnders. The expansion of minority representation in EastEnders provides "more opportunities for audience identification with its characters, hence a wider appeal." Trevor Phillips, CRE chair, said: "balanced representation of ethnic minority communities in the media matters. The industry has a key part to play in this, it is a powerful tool and can go a long way towards helping to build an integrated society."

=== Casting ===
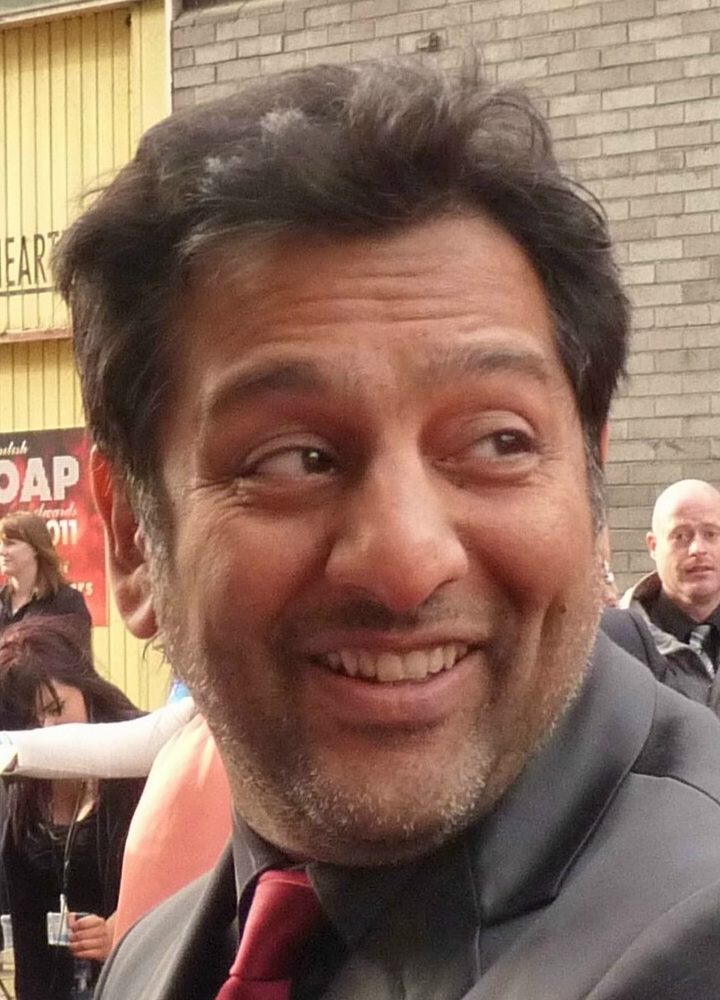
Nitin Ganatra (pictured) portrayed Masood.

Ganatra, who appeared in Bride and Prejudice and Charlie and the Chocolate Factory, was cast in the role of Masood Ahmed. Ganatra had never acted in a soap before his role in EastEnders. He commented: "I have grown up with this show and it seems to have become a part of the British fabric. But friends in America, Canada and India have all seen it or heard of it so it ain't [sic] just this island that it has an impact on... The executive producer, Diederick [Santer], along with casting agent Julia, have been very open and welcoming. I am nervous but excited. I have been watching the show and it is really gripping me. The quality of actors are great, so I am really looking forward to working with them."

Ganatra and Wadia have previous experience of playing a married couple. Both starred alongside each other in the play D'Yer Eat With Your Fingers? Wadia commented: "I'm absolutely thrilled as he's a fantastic actor. It's great fun working with Nitin as we both speak Gujarati which means we can have a bit of fun on set!... He is a good friend. Another good thing about Mrs Masood's great relationship with her husband is that he shows her softer side — with him, you will get to see her smile!"

=== Personality ===
Ganatra discussed his character in 2010, suggesting that Masood is very flexible: "You'll get a different response from him in almost every situation. He's not predicable. He has his lighter moments and then his darker moments. It gives a lot of colour to play with."

== Development ==
In December 2009, Max Branning (Jake Wood) and Phil Mitchell (Steve McFadden) attempt to con Masood and Ian Beale (Adam Woodyatt), but they realise and double bluff them. Ganatra revealed that he enjoyed the storyline, "as I got to shout at Phil and Max a lot. As [Masood] I never get to act with anyone else other than his batty family. It was the first time I’ve exchanged any dialogue with Jake Wood and I’ve only said one line to Steve McFadden in two years."

The character was indirectly involved in a storyline about Muslim homosexuality in 2010, when he discovered that his eldest son Syed was having an adulterous relationship with a man, Christian Clarke (John Partridge). Discussing his character's reaction, Ganatra said, "Masood's world falls apart. [...] Masood has no idea what to do with what he's seen and ends up looking for advice from the imam at the mosque. [...] Masood's given a choice – either the community will disown the family or the family will have to disown Syed. [...] Masood [says] predatory things to Syed and Christian, teasing them about knowing. So in a very subtle way, he lets them both know that he's aware of what's going on and they'd better stop. [...] At first, it's not about what Syed's going through at all. It's about how it makes the family look. It's a very different dilemma to Zainab's. She's a reactive character, whereas Masood's pointing out that there's a bigger picture. Although Zainab appears to be the head of the household, they come from a patriarchal background. It's up to the father of the family to sort situations like this out - and in their culture, you're left with two choices: reject him or be rejected as a family. The whole community could turn on the Masoods."

Masood begins a relationship with Carol Jackson (Lindsey Coulson) which is later troubled by the arrival of her ex-boyfriend David Wicks (Michael French). Ganatra told Jon Peake from TV Choice that Masood is not threatened by David's arrival. But David's manipulative and clever personality develops a rivalry. The actor explained that Carol's theme of falling in love with David soon becomes "Masood's anguish". He wants reassurance but Carol is oblivious to Masood's concerns. Ganatra had worried that Wadia's departure would leave his character without direction. But he was delighted to receive the chance to work with other actors. The actor concluded that Masood had left a thirty-year relationship and wanted him to develop unlikable traits and be bad enough to stop David from winning Carol.

=== Departures and returns ===
In September 2016, it was announced that Ganatra had quit his role. His exit meant that there were no members of the Masood family left in the show at that time. Speaking of his decision to leave, Ganatra stated: ‘When I trained as an actor, I set out to play many different characters and never did I know that I would be so fortunate to have found a character that I have loved playing for nine years. However, after thinking long and hard, I have decided that it is time to get back out there and take on some other roles. I will of course miss everyone at EastEnders – I have had a brilliant time there, and who knows, one day Masood may be back." Ganatra also tweeted: "Genuinely touched by the response to news of my leaving #EastEnders. And thank you for the #masood love!!!" His final scenes aired on 17 November 2016 with Julia's Theme being played over it. On 3 October 2017, it was announced that Ganatra would return to the show a year after his departure. Masood's return includes new Ahmed family members. Of his return, Ganatra said that it was a "lovely surprise" to be asked back and explained that he had been told that Masood "has still much to give to the show and is missed by the audience", saying he found it "hard to refuse". Masood's return aired on 28 November 2017.

On 26 January 2019, it was announced that Ganatra had chosen to leave the show once again. The actor said: "When I was asked to return to EastEnders, it was always with the intention of helping set up new Asian characters that continue the Masood family adventures," he explained. "With Arshad and Mariam at the helm and with the arrival of the feisty sisters Iqra and Habiba, I can now venture off to new horizons as an actor. I am still deeply attached to Masood and have invested much emotion into making this character memorable," Nitin continued. "I am in awe of how loved he is by audiences and fans of all ages, from all cultures and religions and walks of life. Thank you. I am humbled by the love. I will of course miss EastEnders and the wonderful people that work tirelessly to bring audiences dramatic, funny and compelling stories." An EastEnders spokesperson added: "Nitin has been a wonderful addition to the cast and we wish him all the very best for the future." He departed on-screen in the episode broadcast on 19 February 2019, during the show's 34th anniversary. Arshad and Mariam left the show later in 2019, while Habiba and Iqra departed in 2020 and 2022 respectively. Masood's granddaughter, Jade, returns in 2023, but departs in 2024, being the last Masood family member to appear on the soap.

== Storylines ==
When Masood arrives in Albert Square with Zainab, Shabnam and Tamwar in October 2007, both Masood and Zainab are active in the postal industry: Masood is a postman and Zainab is the new owner of the post office in Walford. Masood goes to Pakistan to look after his sick father, but when he returns he discovers that his family are in serious debt. He attempts to resolve the problems to no avail. Due to their financial problems the Masoods are forced to close down the post office. They lie to the local residents that the government has closed them down, and they are then forced to reveal the truth when the residents start protesting. As well as this, daughter Shabnam decides to leave Walford in October 2008 to travel in Pakistan. The Masoods attempt to turn their fortunes around, starting a catering business called "Masala Masood". Ian Beale (Adam Woodyatt) invests £2,000 and the company merges with Ian and Christian Clarke's (John Partridge) catering company "Fit for a Queen", becoming "Masala Queen". Zainab accuses Masood of stealing money from the business, but Tamwar admits taking the money – lending it to his older brother, Syed. Masood reveals that Syed's actions are why he left the family; he had stolen money from the family business and is continuing to do so. Despite this, Zainab contacts Syed and meets him away from Walford, making Masood think she is having an affair. However, the truth is revealed, and Syed moves to Albert Square. Syed also gets engaged to his girlfriend Amira Shah (Preeya Kalidas). Masood plans to take Zainab on a trip around the world. However, Zainab tells Masood she is pregnant, scuppering their plans. In order to earn extra income and money, Masood works an extra shift at the taxi firm, despite being exhausted. When he drives Rachel Branning (Pooky Quesnel) home to Tring, he falls asleep at the wheel and crashes the car. PC Henderson (Jem Wall) questions Masood about the incident and Amira says he swerved to avoid someone on a moped. The police leave and Amira says she lied because she does not want two fathers in prison.

Before Syed and Amira's wedding, Masood visits his brother Inzamam (Paul Bhattacharjee) to ask if he can help pay for the wedding. Zainab reveals that Inzamam has made advances towards her many times. Angry, Masood returns Inzamam's money and tells him he and his family are not welcome in their home any more. A month after the wedding, Masood is unaware that there have been problems in Syed and Amira's relationship. Zainab goes into labour, and Masood delivers the baby, Kamil. Masood's line manager David Hensler (Jonty Stephens) arrives with a colleague, saying there has been an allegation of stolen post and they must search the house. They find a package of Max Branning's (Jake Wood) and Masood receives a caution. Masood walks in on Syed and Christian kissing on the floor of Syed and Amira's new flat and quickly leaves. When Syed admits to his parents that he is gay, Masood attempts to convince Syed that he has a loving wife and a child, but Syed ignores this, and leaves his home. Masood believes that he is no longer part of the family and doesn't even want to hear his name, unlike Zainab who misses him dearly. Amira's father Qadim (Ramon Tikaram) arrives looking for Syed, and after Qadim and his associates beat Christian up, Christian sees Masood outside and begs for help, but Masood leaves him. The next day, Masood regrets his actions, saying that he should've helped Christian but is soon found out by Christian's sister, Jane Beale (Laurie Brett). Jane reveals that Zainab knew about Syed's sexuality even before his wedding. Masood and Zainab argue, and he packs her belongings and physically throws her out. The couple reconcile, however, and Syed moves back into the family home. However, he eventually reunites with Christian, and Masood and Zainab cut off their son again.

Tamwar starts seeing Afia Khan (Meryl Fernandes) and her father, Yusef (Ace Bhatti), turns up and shocks Zainab as he is her former husband whose family set her on fire. He reveals he tried to save her life and he came to make peace, but Masood attacks him and throws him out. Masood discovers that Zainab is planning to buy the Argee Bhajee restaurant against his wishes. Masood meets Jane and they console each other about their respective partners. They meet again and go to a hotel with the intention of sex. However, they both change their minds and decide to remain friends. Zainab continues to defy Masood, and proceeds with her bid for the restaurant. She is successful, but only after paying an inflated price for it. Feeling guilty, he supports her purchase. Ian learns of Masood and Jane's encounter, and confronts him, punching Masood in the face. Tamwar invites Afia to the opening of the Argee Bhajee, Zainab and Masood agree to let Tamwar see Afia in the hope it will fizzle out. When Tamwar and Afia says they are in love, Yusef blesses them to marry, which Zainab and Masood are very displeased about, as they do not want Yusef to become a part of their family. After the roof of the Argee Bhajee collapses and the restaurant is forced to shut, the Masoods find themselves in debt. Zainab finds out that Phil loaned money to Masood for Tamwar's wedding and is furious. Masood is forced to admit that he is gambling by playing poker for Phil in an effort to pay their debt. This angers Zainab as Masood had previously sworn that he would never gamble again, as lost family money to gambling many years ago. Masood kidnaps Yusef in an attempt to scare him off, but when Yusef returns, he claims that Masood beat him and covered him in petrol, when he did not. Zainab kicks Masood out and he is banned from Afia and Tamwar's mehndi. At the mehndi, Afia's aunt tells everyone that Yusef and Zainab are having an affair, having misunderstood and overheard conversation, and Zainab denies this. She invites Masood to dinner, and there is a chance that they might reconcile until Denise Fox (Diane Parish) reveals that Yusef stayed at Zainab's house overnight, so Masood leaves. As part of his plan to destroy the Masood family, Yusef crushes up a bottle of pills and conceals them in Zainab's food. Zainab passes out and is hospitalised, with her family believing she took a deliberate overdose. Concerned that he is causing Zainab's worries, Masood divorces Zainab by saying the triple talaq.

Yusef persuades Zainab to go on holiday with him to Pakistan, and while they are away, Amira returns with her and Syed's daughter, Yasmin. Masood is delighted to learn that he is a grandfather, and vows to reunite and repair his family, especially when it emerges that Yusef has falsified a paternity test to show that Syed is not Yasmin's father. However, Masood despairs when he sees Zainab talking to Yusef again, and declares that he has given up on her. Yusef later tells Masood that he has moven in with Zainab. Masood goes to Jane, who has now returned to Walford divorced from Ian, and tells her he cannot be just friends with her and they kiss. The pair then begin a discreet relationship. On the day that Masood and Zainab's divorce is finalised, Syed and Amira spot Masood together with Jane. Zainab then learns of the relationship. She wishes Masood well, but also tells him that she is marrying Yusef. Masood is shocked, but supports her decision. When Yusef tells Masood and Jane about them taking Kamil to Pakistan, Zainab and Jane argue. Later, Masood and Jane go to dinner at Ian and Mandy's house. At the dinner, Ian asks how Masood and Jane's relationship can develop if Jane is not a Muslim. A drunken Jane replies that she will convert, to the amazement of Masood. Masood talks to Jane about the sacrifices she will have to make to become a Muslim, and tells her he does not expect her to convert. Jane is relieved and decides not to convert after all. Masood finds a letter from Zainab asking for help, and discovers that Yusef has kidnapped Kamil. He plans with Zainab to stop Yusef taking her to Pakistan, and eventually tracks down Kamil and the police are called on Yusef. However, Afia lets him go and he escapes to the B&B where Masood stays during a party. Yusef reveals to Masood that it was not his family who started the fire which nearly killed Zainab but he himself, before setting the building on fire. Masood is caught in the fire with Yusef but tries to save him, however, Yusef is killed while Masood is rescued. Masood and Zainab then reunite, and he later proposes. Masood's brother AJ Ahmed (Phaldut Sharma) arrives in Walford and Masood makes sure AJ avoids Zainab. AJ later proves to be a bad influence on Masood when they damage Derek Branning's (Jamie Foreman) car with a shopping trolley. Derek later warns Masood that he has until the following day to repair the damage. When AJ discovers that Masood and Zainab are divorced, AJ later admits to Masood that he came to Walford because his wife has left him. Masood decides to catch up with AJ and tell him all about what had happened with Yusef. AJ leaves after taking Masood and Zainab's advice to reunite with his wife, but later returns when they split up for good. Zainab is unhappy when Masood says he wants to become a teaching assistant, but she eventually comes around to the idea and he starts his new job.

Christian and Syed marry, but bailiffs arrive as the mortgage for the restaurant is four months in arrears. Masood and AJ try to get money from Kamil and Tamwar's trust funds to pay them but Masood finds the bank accounts are empty. He is angry at Zainab for keeping further secrets, and Syed reveals she took the money for him, and that the business is in ruins because of him. Masood then forces Zainab to leave Walford. When she returns, Masood is angry that she was not around during financial problems. However, they reconcile. Ayesha Rana (Shivani Ghai) comes to stay so she can meet Rashid Kayani (Gurpreet Singh), her suitor. However, Ayesha develops a crush on Masood, which he keeps hidden from Zainab. Masood makes it clear to Ayesha that he is not interested. Zainab buys an expensive water feature so that her neighbours will not think the family is poor, and she appears to care more about that than her relationship with Masood. When the water feature is sabotaged by Tiffany Butcher (Maisie Smith) and Morgan Butcher (Devon Higgs), Zainab blames Masood, who smashes the water feature in frustration. Ayesha tells Zainab she loves Masood and says he feels the same. Zainab tells her to leave, which she does. Masood and Zainab have several discussions and arguments, and eventually split, with Zainab taking Kamil and moving back to Pakistan.

Masood becomes close to Carol Jackson (Lindsey Coulson) and they arrange a date. It is put on hold when Ayesha returns, but Masood rejects her advances and she leaves. He tries again with Carol, but David Wicks (Michael French) comes back to Walford and Carol takes him in. When David attempts to come between Masood and Carol, Masood invites Carol to live with him, which she does, but returns to live with David after one night. Masood takes the breakup badly and loses Tamwar's university fund in a poker game to Alfie Moon (Shane Richie). When Tamwar discovers that his savings are missing, Masood lets Tamwar's friend Fatboy (Ricky Norwood) take the blame. When Masood is found in an alleyway after being mugged, Tamwar is left to look after him. Tamwar's new boss, Aleks Shirovs (Kristian Kiehling), arrives at his house and accuses Tamwar of stealing money from the workplace, when it was actually Masood. Tamwar discovers this after Aleks leaves, and shouts and insults Masood, who retaliates by punching Tamwar in the mouth. The next day, Tamwar tries to throw Masood out of the house, but he throws a drink over him and refuses to move out. Fatboy then calls Shabnam (now played by Rakhee Thakrar) and reveals that Masood punched Tamwar, so she returns to Albert Square permanently.

Much to Shabnam's disapproval, Masood and Jane begin dating again when she returns to Walford. Shabnam attempts to reunite Jane with her ex-husband Ian, even though Ian is now engaged to Denise. When Ian's daughter, Lucy (Hetti Bywater) is murdered (see Who Killed Lucy Beale?), Jane and Ian find solace together and have sex. Jane then breaks up with Masood and abruptly leaves Walford. Masood, having found out what had transpired between Ian and Jane, angrily accuses Ian of stealing his girlfriend but later feels remorse about confronting Ian while he was grieving. Weeks later, Masood helps Ian out at Ian's restaurant and the two make amends. Ian then offers Masood a job. Masood starts gambling once again after being denied the chance to acquire the Arjee Barjee, he uses his family's money to fund his habit

Following Shabnam's engagement to Kush Kazemi (Davood Ghadami), Masood overhears them talking about her daughter, Roya, who she gave up for adoption seven years previously. He confronts her and she admits it is true. Inzamam's wife Fatima Inzamam (Anu Hassan) tells Masood the child, now called Jade Green (Amaya Edward), was not adopted and she knows where she is. Following a heated exchange with Shabnam over Jade's welfare, Masood is banned from her wedding although they later reconcile. Shabnam is shocked when she catches Masood and Kush's mother Carmel Kazemi (Bonnie Langford) in bed together. When Zainab cannot attend Kush and Shabnam's wedding, Masood goes to Pakistan and convinces her to send Kamil to attend the wedding. Masood later tells Tamwar that Zainab has been planning on cutting off all ties to her family. When prompted by Tamwar, Masood calls Zainab and refuses her access to Kamil unless she comes back to Walford to collect him herself. Masood later visits Carmel to tell her this, and the two agree to go out for drinks as just friends, though they have sex with Carmel is feeling lonely. Masood finds out that Kush is the father of Stacey Branning's (Lacey Turner) baby son Arthur and that Carmel knew about this, so he accuses Carmel of lying to him and punches Kush. Shabnam leaves Walford, and later, Masood learns that Zainab is getting married in Pakistan and she wants Tamwar and Kamil to attend, sending him money for plane tickets. Masood gives the money to Tamwar, who is planning to travel with his girlfriend Nancy Carter (Maddy Hill). Tina Carter (Luisa Bradshaw-White) sets up a dating profile for Masood and he arranges a date but she leaves when she sees him, and he blames Carmel, calling her jealous. He tells Tamwar he has failed in life, prompting Tamwar to decide not to leave. However, he apologises to Carmel and she advises him to face Zainab and then go on holiday so he can move on with his life. Masood agrees to do so and books three tickets to Pakistan and Thailand, telling Masood and Nancy that the three of them can travel together. However, this does not happen and after sharing an emotional goodbye with Masood, Tamwar leaves with Nancy alone.

Masood mistakes Denise's encourages to find romance as flirting and holds her hand, upsetting Carmel, but Masood is embarrassed when he realises his mistake. Carmel later suggests she and Masood enter a casual sexual relationship as friends. Masood, although flattered, declines the offer. After he, Denise and Carmel make a pact to make the most out of life, Masood reveals that he has booked for him and Kamil to go travelling for 10 months. Carmel and Denise tell Masood that that is not a good idea as it would mean taking Kamil out of school and Carmel will miss Masood. However, Masood is adamant on going and Carmel is later stunned when she notices Masood's house is up for let, but she and Denise put it down to Masood suffering a midlife crisis. Denise sets Carmel and Masood up on a date so that their arrangement can become more romantic, and Carmel tells Denise that Masood has cancelled his travelling plans for her, but Denise hears that Masood is still planning to go, and Carmel is upset, so Denise tells Masood that he has been leading Carmel on. After learning that Denise is pregnant, Masood becomes her confidante when she reveals that the father is Phil Mitchell (Steve McFadden), which leaves him stunned, but he promises not to reveal her secret before leaving. Masood returns a few weeks later with Kamil, and is shocked to find that Carmel and her youngest son Shakil Kazemi (Shaheen Jafargholi) have moved into his house. Masood is forced to move in with them but claims that he is back because Kamil was homesick, though he admits to Jane that he missed Carmel, however, Masood and Carmel end up arguing over Carmel's furniture and things between them grow tense when she accuses him of being lazy and badly influencing Shakil.

Masood later grows close to Belinda Peacock (Carli Norris) when attempting to help her salon business, "Elysium", out of financial difficulty. They later agree they are attracted to each other, but she wants him to invest money so he makes her choose either the money or a relationship, so she opts for the latter. Carmel and Belinda's cousin, Stacey, disapprove of the relationship, especially when Belinda attempts to change Masood's dress sense. However, Belinda and Masood have sex on the salon floor. Masood hears that Zainab is getting divorced and calls her in Pakistan to comfort her and he books two tickets to Pakistan, while Belinda leaves Walford to go travelling with a friend. Carmel tries to stop Masood leaving but he insists he is doing what is best for Kamil. Denise is against him leaving and they have a falling out, but Carmel warns her not to let things end badly, so they make amends and he explains that all he sees in Walford is ghosts of the past. Masood says goodbye to his friends and leaves Walford with Kamil, with Jane saying they will always be here if he needs them. He and Kamil then leave, returning to Pakistan.

A year later, Masood visits the Square to tell Carmel he is evicting her at the end of the year. Several months later, he moves in his uncle Arshad (Madhav Sharma) and aunt Mariam Ahmed (Indira Joshi), to give them more space for fostering. When Masood returns to the square, he speaks to Jack Branning (Scott Maslen) about renting a flat and borrows money from Arshad to pay the deposit. He also tries to con Carmel out of her security deposit but she threatens him into returning it. Masood sleeps in his ice cream truck as business is failing and he is homeless. Mariam and Arshad's foster daughter, Daisy (Amelie Smith), moves in and Masood is left to look after her but she goes missing when he leaves the room. The police are contacted, and in the search for Daisy, Masood's ice cream van is found and he is forced to reveal his lack of success to his family. Ian finds Daisy and returns her to the Ahmeds, but delays taking her back because Masood joked to him that Arshad and Mariam religiously brainwash children. The police are unimpressed and a report has to be filed about Daisy's disappearance, which Masood worries will harm his family's fostering. Masood moves in with Arshad and Mariam, who want Masood to pay rent despite owning the house, and Masood gains a job as a barman at The Vic, pretending to Arshad and Mariam he is a salesman. Masood quits his job from The Vic when Arshad finds out he is a barman, though he is taken on at Ian's fish shop, though customers do not like Masood's Indian twist. However, Robbie Jackson (Dean Gaffney) who has mistakenly eaten Masood's samosas thinking that it was a bonus lunch, tells Masood to sell them on the market. Masood is ashamed to ask Mariam for the recipe to the samosas and lies that he needs her to cook them for his date. Mariam makes them but discovers that Masood is lying and she believes that he wants a new wife. Mariam arranges a date between him and a lawyer named Noor, but he eventually tells Mariam the truth and she agrees to help him. Masood sells the samosas in the chip shop in secret but Ian's mother, Kathy Beale (Gillian Taylforth), finds out and sacks him, however, she gives his job back when she realises the samosas are increasing trade. However, when Ian returns from a trip, he sacks Masood after Masood requests a cut of the profits from the samosa sales.

Masood then plans to sell street food but his old van has been vandalised and he asks Mo Harris (Laila Morse) to set up an online fundraiser. It is successful but he is forced to delete it because Mo has falsely claimed that Masood has neurocysticercosis. Masood and Ian both arrange to meet Alison Smith (Julianne White), a woman who is looking to invest in local businesses, but Ian accidentally takes Masood's business plan into his meeting. Alison is impressed but when Masood realises the error, Alison offers double the investment if they are a partnership, and they both accept. Masood plans to use his van while Ian will reopen his restaurant. However, Ian continuously attempts to push Masood out of the decision-making process. When Mariam and Arshad give Masood a large sum of cash, Masood decides he no longer needs Ian's help but is unable to tell him after Ian finds Shakil Kazemi (Shaheen Jafargholi), who has been stabbed, and puts him in the recovery position. Ian and Masood argue over the restaurant, especially when Ian's flyers barely mention Masood's side of the business and Masood lies about getting the cheque from the investor. Ian is humiliated when he gets locked inside Masood's van due to a broken lock, especially after not realising the passenger works and Kathy lets him out. Club manager Mel Owen (Tamzin Outhwaite), who Ian is trying to impress, clashes with Ian and Masood over where their van is parked, and is unhappy every time it is moved. She tells Ian that parking it in a commercial street violates a rule and she will report them to the council. Ian lies to Masood that Mel complained to the council, but Masood realises and tells Ian to stop cutting him out of the business, and Ian tells Mel that they can work together to increase each other's business. Ian pretends to be ill to Masood so he can discuss business with Mel and when Masood finds out, he him the van will be called "Masood at Walford East" and Ian cannot object.

While working together in the restaurant, Masood and Kathy share some lingering looks and touches. When the restaurant launches, Ian catches Masood and Kathy kissing, which causes an argument and a Walford Gazette photographer captures Ian throwing cake at Masood. Ian is humiliated by the news report and decides to cut Masood out of the business and change the menu. Ian accuses Kathy of never listening to him, breaking her promise to "be his mum again" and always wanting something else than her family, so Kathy ends things with Masood. Masood finds out Tamwar and Nancy are to marry in Australia. When Kathy returns from a holiday, she tells Masood she wants a proper relationship with him; he says he wants the same and they kiss. They tell Ian about their relationship, and Masood asks Kathy to be his guest at Tamwar and Nancy's wedding and then says he wants them both to live in Australia. However, Kathy says she needs to stay in Walford because Ian's son, Bobby Beale (Clay Milner Russell), is due to be released for prison and her family need her. Masood decides to sell his share of the restaurant to Max, and when Kathy finds out, she confronts Masood but he says he cannot make her choose between him and her family and he also has to be with his family, so they cannot continue their relationship. Mariam and Arshad's granddaughters, Iqra (Priya Davdra) and Habiba Ahmed (Rukku Nahar), arrive and tell Masood they will look after the restaurant and his house while he is in Australia and Masood allows it because he knows Ian and Max will not like it. Masood and Kathy share one last kiss before he leaves Walford to live in Australia.

In July 2024, Jane is seen on the phone to Masood and it is revealed that the two have reunited.

== Other appearances ==
Masood appears in the spin-off series EastEnders: E20. In episode 1 of series 1, Fatboy (Ricky Norwood) attempts to sell him Zsa Zsa Carter's (Emer Kenny) belongings that he found but he leaves when Leon Small (Sam Attwater) interrupts. In episode 2 of series 2, Masood is on the tube clutching his rucksack and Stevie Dickinson (Amanda Fairbank-Hynes) suspects he is a terrorist, and tells him that love can heal his pain but Naz Mehmet (Emaa Hussen) pulls her away. Later, a drunken Stevie apologises and when Masood notices she is cold and wet, he offers her his coat. In episode 4, Stevie returns the coat while Masood is working on the market, and attempts to flirt with him, but her tactics fail. She later returns and flirts again, asking if she has any work going and he asks her to come back the next day. She thinks her flirting has worked so goes back but ends up flashing her bra, so Naz ushers her away. In episode 6 he comes out during the power cut caused by Stevie and Sol Levi (Tosin Cole) and asks why Stevie's is the only flat with electricity. In episode 10, Stevie kisses Masood, saying one day they will have tea together.

== Reception ==
Masood, along with the rest of his family, was criticised by actor Deepak Verma, who played Sanjay Kapoor between 1993 and 1998. He said that EastEnders had failed to portray Asian families in a realistic manner, branding the family "two-dimensional and ill-conceived". A BBC spokesperson responded by saying "It's a shame Deepak feels that way but that's clearly his personal opinion. The Masood family have proved to be hugely popular with EastEnders viewers."

Ganatra has received a number of award nominations for his portrayal of Masood, including Best Actor at the 2010 and 2011 British Soap Awards and Best Actor at the 2010 and 2011 Inside Soap Awards. Additionally, Ganatra and Wadia shared the award for 'Best On-Screen Partnership' at the 2009 British Soap Awards. In 2011 Inside Soap readers voted Masood their least favourite member of his family.
