= 2016 British Soap Awards =

Annual British TV awards ceremony

- Date: 24 May 2016
- Location: Hackney Empire, Hackney
- Country: United Kingdom
- Presented by: Various
- Hosted by: Phillip Schofield
- Most awards: EastEnders; Emmerdale (both 5)

Television/radio coverage
- Network: ITV; STV
- Runtime: 120 minutes

The 2016 British Soap Awards honoured the best in British soap operas throughout 2015 and 2016. The ceremony was held on 24 May 2016 at the Hackney Empire theatre in Hackney, London, and was broadcast four days later on ITV and STV. The publicly voted categories were announced on 4 April 2016, with the vote opening that same day. This included a longlist for the Best Actress and Actor awards. The shortlist, including panel nominations, was released on 2 May 2016.

ITV soap Emmerdale won two of the three viewer-voted categories including Best British Soap, tying with BBC soap EastEnders for taking home the most awards of the night. ITV soap Coronation Street won three awards, with both BBC soap Doctors and Channel 4 soap Hollyoaks winning one each. EastEnders cast member Steve McFadden won the British Soap Award for Outstanding Achievement for his role as Phil Mitchell. The Outstanding Achievement Award (Off Screen) was renamed to the Tony Warren award, in memory of Coronation Street creator Tony Warren, who died in March 2016. It was given to casting director James Bain, who worked on both Coronation Street and Emmerdale. EastEnders' executive producer at the time, Dominic Treadwell-Collins, called out the ceremony on Twitter for having "all white" winners, criticising the lack of diversity.

== Winners and nominees ==
=== Publicly voted ===
Award	Winner	Shortlisted (Note: These nominees were voted through to the shortlist round.)	Longlisted (Note: These nominees were unsuccessful in being voted through to the shortlist.)
Best British Soap	Emmerdale	Coronation Street; Doctors; EastEnders; Hollyoaks	—N/a
Best Actor	Danny Miller (Aaron Livesy in Emmerdale)	Jack P. Shepherd (David Platt in Coronation Street); Danny Dyer (Mick Carter in EastEnders); Charlie Clapham (Freddie Roscoe in Hollyoaks); Kieron Richardson (Ste Hay in Hollyoaks)	Alan Halsall (Tyrone Dobbs in Coronation Street); Ben Price (Nick Tilsley in Coronation Street); Matthew Chambers (Daniel Granger in Doctors); Owen Brenman (Heston Carter in Doctors); Ian Midlane (Al Haskey in Doctors); James Bye (Martin Fowler in EastEnders); Davood Ghadami (Kush Kazemi in EastEnders); Dominic Brunt (Paddy Kirk in Emmerdale); John Middleton (Ashley Thomas in Emmerdale); Ashley Taylor Dawson (Darren Osborne in Hollyoaks)
Best Actress	Lacey Turner (Stacey Fowler in EastEnders)	Alison King (Carla Connor in Coronation Street); Rakhee Thakrar (Shabnam Masood in EastEnders); Lucy Pargeter (Chas Dingle in Emmerdale); Jennifer Metcalfe (Mercedes McQueen in Hollyoaks)	Kate Ford (Tracy Barlow in Coronation Street); Paula Lane (Kylie Platt in Coronation Street); Lorna Laidlaw (Mrs Tembe in Doctors); Jan Pearson (Karen Hollins Doctors); Laura Rollins (Ayesha Lee in Doctors); Diane Parish (Denise Fox in EastEnders); Charlotte Bellamy (Laurel Thomas in Emmerdale); Zoë Henry (Rhona Goskirk in Emmerdale); Nadine Mulkerrin (Cleo McQueen in Hollyoaks); Nikki Sanderson (Maxine Minniver in Hollyoaks)

=== Panel voted ===
Award	Winner	Nominees
Best Comedy Performance	Patti Clare (Mary Taylor in Coronation Street)	Sarah Moyle (Valerie Pitman in Doctors); Tameka Empson (Kim Fox-Hubbard in EastEnders); Matthew Wolfenden (David Metcalfe in Emmerdale); Ross Adams (Scott Drinkwell in Hollyoaks)
Best Female Dramatic Performance	Lacey Turner (Stacey Fowler in EastEnders)	Tina O'Brien (Sarah Platt in Coronation Street); Sarah Moyle (Valerie Pitman in Doctors); Charlotte Bellamy (Laurel Thomas in Emmerdale); Zöe Lucker (Reenie McQueen in Hollyoaks)
Best Male Dramatic Performance	Danny Miller (Aaron Livesy in Emmerdale)	Jack P. Shepherd (David Platt in Coronation Street); Adrian Lewis Morgan (Jimmi Clay in Doctors); Steve McFadden (Phil Mitchell in EastEnders); Jeremy Sheffield (Patrick Blake in Hollyoaks)
Best Newcomer	Bonnie Langford (Carmel Kazemi in EastEnders)	Shayne Ward (Aidan Connor in Coronation Street); Bharti Patel (Ruhma Hanif in Doctors); Isobel Steele (Liv Flaherty in Emmerdale); Duayne Boachie (Zack Loveday in Hollyoaks)
Best On-Screen Partnership	Joe Duttine and Sally Dynevor (Tim and Sally Metcalfe in Coronation Street)	Ian Kelsey and Dido Miles (Howard Bellamy and Emma Reid in Doctors); Danny Dyer and Kellie Bright (Mick and Linda Carter in EastEnders); Danny Miller and Ryan Hawley (Aaron Livesy and Robert Sugden in Emmerdale); Ashley Taylor Dawson and Jessica Fox (Darren and Nancy Osborne in Hollyoaks)
Best Single Episode	"The Heart of England" (Doctors)	"The Live Episode" (Coronation Street); "Shabnam's stillbirth" (EastEnders); "Aftermath of Village Hall explosion" (Emmerdale); "Patrick's right to die decision" (Hollyoaks)
Best Storyline	Stacey's postpartum psychosis (EastEnders)	Callum's reign of terror and Sarah's baby (Coronation Street); Treehouse (Doctors); Aaron's abuse (Emmerdale); The McQueen's cycle of abuse (Hollyoaks)
Best Young Performance	Ruby O'Donnell (Peri Lomax in Hollyoaks)	Elle Mulvaney (Amy Barlow in Coronation Street); Grace (Janet Mitchell in EastEnders); Amelia Flanagan (April Windsor in Emmerdale)
Outstanding Achievement	Steve McFadden (Phil Mitchell in EastEnders)	—N/a
Scene of the Year	Val's death (Emmerdale)	Callum's death (Coronation Street); Valerie leaves Barry at the altar (Doctors); Mick and Linda finally get married (EastEnders); Nico kills Patrick (Hollyoaks)
The Tony Warren Award	James Bain (Coronation Street and Emmerdale casting director)	—N/a
Villain of the Year	Connor McIntyre (Pat Phelan in Coronation Street)	Adam Astill (Anthony Harker in Doctors); Ellen Thomas (Claudette Hubbard in EastEnders); Ryan Hawley (Robert Sugden in Emmerdale); Sophie Austin (Lindsey Roscoe in Hollyoaks)

== Wins by soap ==
Soap opera	Wins
EastEnders	5
Emmerdale	5
Coronation Street	3
Doctors	1
Hollyoaks	1
