= List of fictional postal employees =

This is a list of fictional post office employees with a significant role in notable works of fiction.

- Il Postino - Italian postman in the film of the same name
- Carl Schliff - A letter carrier in Dead Rising 2 who is more concerned with completing his route than getting bit by a zombie
- Choo-Choo Curtis (sometimes "Chug-Chug Curtis") - Pogo comic
- Gordon Krantz - The eponymous protagonist of The Postman
- Gordon Smith - See Spot Run
- International Express Man - Good Omens; played by Simon Merrells in the television adaptation
- Jack Danger (pronounced Donger) - An obnoxious postal inspection worker in season 2 of Brooklyn Nine-Nine.
- Jaimito the Mailman - A recurring character in El Chavo del Ocho (1979–1981; 1982–1992)
- Jamie - A postman in Steven Universe.
- Albert Lippincott - The protagonist of J. Robert Lennon's 2003 novel Mailman
- Mary Minor 'Harry' Harristeen - The postmistress of Crozet in a series of mystery novels by Rita Mae Brown
- Mr. Wilson - Retired mail carrier from the American comic strip Dennis the Menace
- Norris Cole - Postmaster at The Kabin newsagents and post office, Coronation Street
- Parcel Mistress - Also known as PM from Homestuck
- Pat Clifton - Postman Pat in the eponymous children's television series (postman)
- Pete - The mail carrier in Animal Crossing.
- Ray the mailman - A recurring character on 227
- Rita Sullivan - Postmistress at the Kabin newsagents and post office, Coronation Street
- Sam Porter Bridges - The player-character in Death Stranding, portrayed by Norman Reedus.
- Sister - The protagonist of Eudora Welty's "Why I Live at the P.O."
- Snail - A Year with Frog and Toad
- Special Delivery Kluger - Santa Claus is Comin' to Town (1970)
- Stan - The postman in Wizadora
- Stanley Stupid - The Stupids
- The Courier - The player-character in Fallout: New Vegas.
- Vince Parker - A postman played by Peter Brookes and featured in the television soap opera Crossroads
- Viv Hope - Postmistress at the village post office in Emmerdale
- Clive James - Writer and broadcaster; had a walk-on part in Neighbours as Ramsay Street's postman
- Jamie Hope - Emmerdale
- Herman Post - Jon Arbuckle's mailman, whom Garfield constantly torments in the Garfield comic strip
- Masood Ahmed - EastEnders
- Mr. Zip - A cartoon character used by the United States Postal Service
- Shabnam Masood - EastEnders
- Zainab Masood - EastEnders
- Evil Mailman - Olive, the Other Reindeer
- George the tortoise - Playhouse Disney's The Koala Brothers
- Lag Seeing - Delivery boy from the manga and anime Tegami Bachi
- Manic Mailman - A mailman in Itchy & Scratchy, Bart Simpson's favorite show on The Simpsons
- Miss Maccalariat - Going Postal
- Mr. Beasley - Blondie
- Myron Larabee - Jingle All the Way
- Pechkin - Three from Prostokvashino
- Reba - The mail woman in Pee-wee's Playhouse
- Sam Drucker - Petticoat Junction and Green Acres; runs a post office in his general store
- Agent K - Played by Tommy Lee Jones in Men in Black II; within the MiB universe, most postal workers are aliens
- Stanley Howler - Going Postal
- Cliff Clavin - Cheers
- Denise Fox - EastEnders
- Anghammarad - Going Postal
- Tolliver Groat - Going Postal
- Henry Chinaski - Charles Bukowski's alter ego in the book Post Office
- Moist von Lipwig - Going Postal (postmaster)
- Mr. McFeely - Mister Rogers' Neighborhood
- Mrs. Goggins - Postman Pat (postmistress)
- Newman - Seinfeld
- Willie Lumpkin - Mailman of the Fantastic Four in Marvel Comics
- Jheng Jhi-tao - Story Palace
- UPS Guy - Legally Blonde
- Harvey - Hey Arnold! (voiced by Lou Rawls)
- Jesper - Klaus (voiced by Jason Schwartzman)
