= Rakhee Thakrar =

English actress (born 1984)

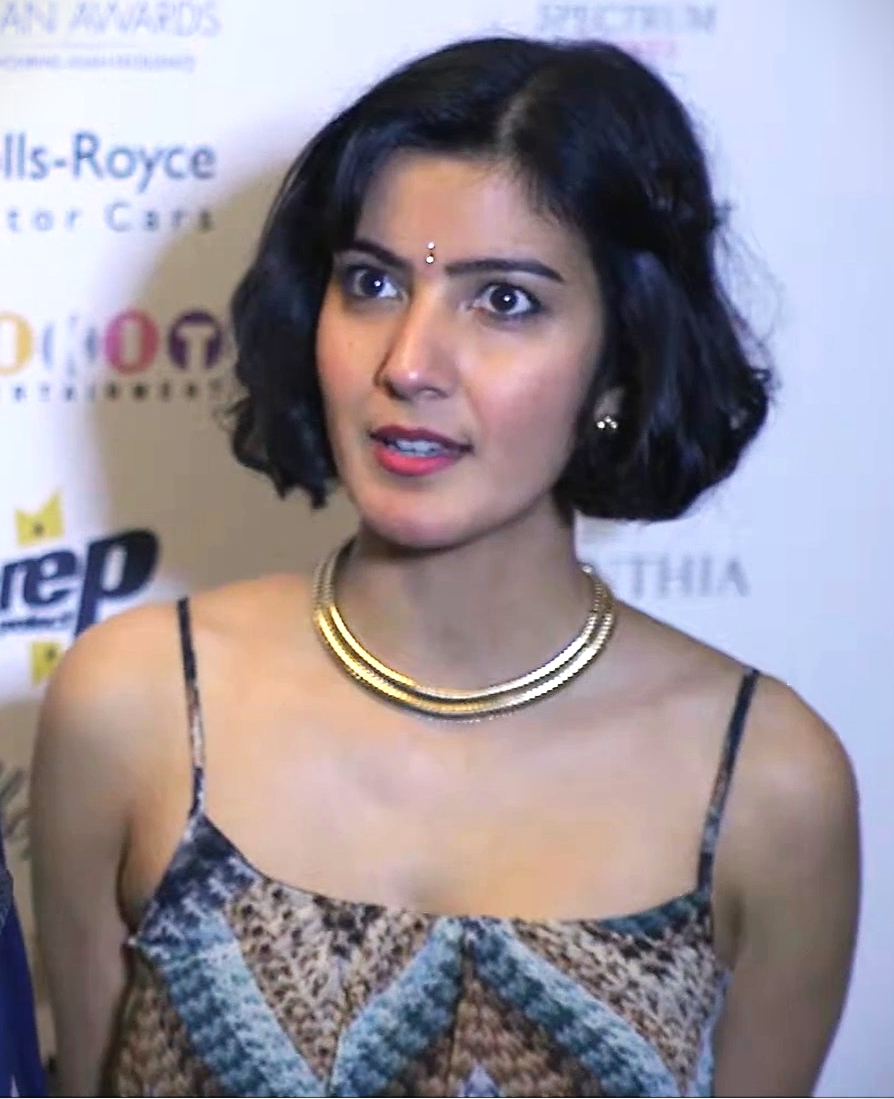
- Thakrar at The Asian Awards in 2016
- Born: 29 February 1984 (age 42); Leicester, Leicestershire, England
- Occupation: Actress
- Years active: 2004–present
- Television: EastEnders; Sex Education

Rakhee Thakrar (born 29 February 1984) is an English actress. She is known for her roles as Shabnam Masood in the BBC One soap opera EastEnders (2014–2016) and Emily Sands in the Netflix comedy-drama Sex Education (2019–2023). She also voices the Eighth Doctor's companion Bliss in Big Finish's Doctor Who: The Time War audio dramas.

== Early life and education ==
Thakrar was born on a Leap Year Day in 1984, and grew up in the St Matthew's area of Leicester, England. She is of Indian descent, and both parents worked in factories.

She attended Taylor Primary School and Soar Valley College. She took drama as a GCSE subject and acted in a play at the Phoenix Theatre. As a teenager, Thakrar became involved with Hathi Productions, a theatre club based in Leicester run by Jez Simons, her drama teacher, who has written for EastEnders.

She was going to study textile design, but decided to take a year out, which led to several roles on the stage as well as learning a lot about the theatre production.

== Career ==
=== Acting ===
In 2004, Thakrar landed the role of Roopa Chauhan in the radio drama Silver Street, which was broadcast on the BBC Asian Network. Thakrar played the role from the first episode in 2004, to the last episode in 2010. In 2006, Thakrar made her first TV appearance in BBC drama Banglatown Banquet. Thakrar went on to feature in a number of TV series including Doctors, Holby City, Peep Show and, notably, played a lead character in the British-Asian drama Cloud 9.

Thakrar was cast in EastEnders in 2013 and made her first on-screen appearance on 13 January 2014. Her character, Shabnam Masood, had previously been played by Zahra Ahmadi from 2007 to 2008. Thakrar's most famous storyline while portraying Shabnam was when the character gave birth to a stillborn son, with viewers, critics and co-workers praising her performance throughout the storyline. Due to her performance in the storyline, Thakrar has subsequently become an ambassador for the stillbirth charity, Sands. Thakrar left EastEnders in 2015 and was last seen onscreen on 5 February 2016, following Shabnam's failed marriage to Kush Kazemi (Davood Ghadami).

In 2019, she began portraying the role of Emily Sands in the Netflix comedy drama series Sex Education. (2019–2023).

She also voices the Eighth Doctor's companion Bliss in Big Finish's Doctor Who: The Time War audio dramas.

=== Journalism ===
In 2004, Thakrar was one of 20 young people recruited to the Leicester Mercury's Pathfinder scheme. Run in conjunction with Leicester City Council, it enabled a team of young journalists to spend 10 months gaining an introduction to print journalism and reporting on their communities. During this time, Thakrar wrote articles on subjects such as the influence Bollywood has had on Leicester, as well as the peculiar situation of being born on 29 February.

== Filmography ==
=== Film ===
| Year | Title | Role | Notes |
|---|---|---|---|
| 2006 | Tourettes Haiku | Sunny | Short films |
| 2007 | Circle | Tina Parekh | Short films |
| 2012 | TYU's Company | GGS Voice | Short films |
| 2016 | Juliet Remembered | Deena | Short films |
| 2017 | Those Four Walls | Neha | |
| 2018 | Love, Sex and Side Effects | Rosie | Short films |
| 2019 | Extinction | (unknown) | Short films |
| 2019 | End-O | Dr. Womaan | Short films |
| 2020 | 23 Walks | Registrar | |
| 2020 | Summerland | Mrs. Evans | |
| 2020 | Running Naked | Jade | |
| 2023 | My Happy Ending | Imaan | |
| 2023 | Wonka | Lottie Bell | |
| 2024 | September Says | Sheela | |
| 2024 | Spirit of Place | (unknown) | Short films |
| 2024 | Mouse! | Priya | Short films |

=== Television ===
| Year | Title | Role | Notes |
|---|---|---|---|
| 2006 | Banglatown Banquet | Rozena | Television film |
| 2007 | Doctors | Safeena Abbasi | Series 9; episode 37: "Losing It All" |
| 2009 | No Signal! | Various | Episode 7 |
| 2010 | Doctors | Jasmin Sharma | Series 12; episode 30: "Pound of Flesh" |
| 2010–2011 | Holby City | Sarita Dubashi | Series 13; episodes 3, 4 & 17 |
| 2011 | Page Eight | Muna Hammami | Television film |
| 2011 | DCI Banks | Lab Assistant | Series 1; episode 3: "Playing with Fire: Part 1" |
| 2011 | The Jury | Rashid's Sister | Series 2; episode 1 |
| 2012 | Peep Show | Waitress | Series 8; episode 2: "Business Secrets of the Pharaohs" |
| 2012 | Bollywood Carmen | Tannishta - The Fiancée | Television film |
| 2013 | Cloud 9 | Simran | Regular role; 112 episodes |
| 2013–2014 | Invizimals | Jazmin (voice) | Episodes 1–13 |
| 2014–2016 | EastEnders | Shabnam Masood/Kazemi | Regular role; 172 episodes |
| 2014, 2015 | Children in Need | Shabnam Masood/Kazemi | 2 television specials |
| 2019–2023 | Sex Education | Emily Sands | Series 1–4; 18 episodes |
| 2019 | Four Weddings and a Funeral | Fatima | Miniseries; episodes 4–8 & 10 |
| 2020 | Criminal: UK | Nasreen Shah | Series 2; episode 1: "Julia" |
| 2021 | The Girl Before | Mia | Miniseries; episodes 1–4 |
| 2022 | Rules of the Game | Maya Benshaw | Episodes 1–4 |
| 2022, 2025 | Karen Pirie | Bel Richmond | Series 1 & 2; 6 episodes |
| 2024 | Finders Keepers | DS Carole Doyle | Miniseries; episodes 1 & 2 |
| 2025 | I, Jack Wright | Laura Johnstone | Episodes 1–6 |
| 2025 | Man Like Mobeen | Leila | Series 5; episodes 1 & 2: "Tainted Love" & "No Diggity" |

=== Video games ===
| Year | Title | Role | Notes |
|---|---|---|---|
| 2013 | Invizimals: The Alliance | Jazmin (voice) | |

== Stage ==
| Year | Title | Role | Notes |
|---|---|---|---|
| 2017 | Astronauts of Hartlepool | Nadia | Vault Festival |
| 2018 | There or Here | Neera | Park Theatre, London |
| 2022 | Paradise Now! | Laurie | Bush Theatre, London |
| 2026 | The Oresteia | Chandra | Bridge Theatre, London |

== Awards and nominations ==
| Year | Award | Category | Result | Ref. |
|---|---|---|---|---|
| 2014 | TV Choice Awards | Best Soap Newcomer | Nominated | |
| 2015 | Inside Soap Awards | Best Actress | Nominated | |
| 2015 | Asian Media Awards | Best TV Character | Won | |
| 2015 | Digital Spy Reader Awards | Best Actor | Third | |
| 2016 | 21st National Television Awards | Serial Drama Performance | Shortlisted | |
| 2016 | 2016 British Soap Awards | Best Actress | Shortlisted | |
