= Kush Kazemi =

Fictional character from EastEnders

- EastEnders character
- Portrayed by: Davood Ghadami
- Duration: 2014–2021
- First appearance: Episode 4945; 20 October 2014
- Last appearance: Episode 6257; 19 April 2021
- Introduced by: Dominic Treadwell-Collins
- Spin-off appearances: The Queen Vic Quiz Night (2020)
In-universe information
- Other names: Khouroush Kazemi
- Occupation: Market trader
- Father: Umar Kazemi
- Mother: Carmel Kazemi
- Brothers: Darius Kazemi; Shakil Kazemi
- Wife: Safirah Kazemi (backstory); Shabnam Masood (2015–2016)
- Sons: Zaair Kazemi; Arthur Fowler

Kush Kazemi is a fictional character from the BBC soap opera EastEnders, played by Davood Ghadami. Ghadami's casting was announced in August 2014 before Kush was introduced by executive producer Dominic Treadwell-Collins in episode 4945, broadcast on 20 October 2014, as a friend of established character Martin Fowler (James Bye). Kush was created to be a new main character who would "spice up" Albert Square and was initially billed as a hunky, energetic, funny, and kind-hearted market trader who masked a tragic backstory.

Across his stint, his storylines focused on his various romances and flings with female characters such as Shabnam Masood (Rakhee Thakrar), Stacey Slater (Lacey Turner), Denise Fox (Diane Parish), Kat Slater (Jessie Wallace), and Whitney Dean (Shona McGarty). In September 2020, it was announced that Ghadami had left the soap after over six years, with the character being killed-off in episode 6257, broadcast on 19 April 2021, where he is pushed in front of an oncoming train by Gray Atkins (Toby-Alexander Smith). Ghadami received multiple awards and nominations for his performance and Kush's character was generally praised for his good-natured personality; However, he was often deemed to be underused and the character's death scene was panned by critics.

== Creation and introduction ==
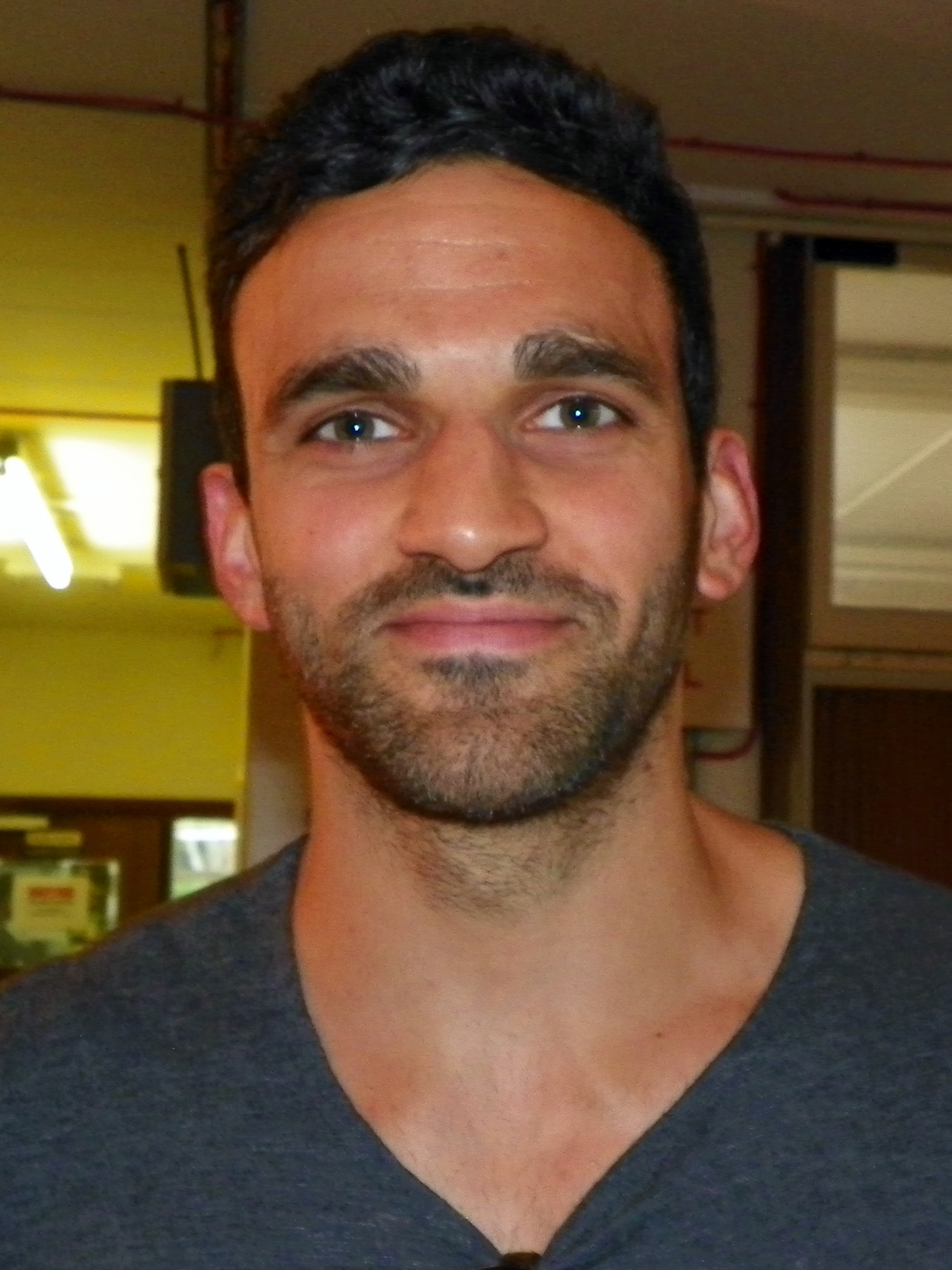
Kush (Ghadami, pictured) was initially envisioned as a "good guy" and "a new leading man to spice up the market".

The character was announced on 19 August 2014, where he was "set to cause a big stir in Walford" as he would open a stall at Walford's market, sparking a competitive rivalry with Kat Moon (Jessie Wallace). Kush is initially billed as a "good guy" who is "funny and full of energy", but hides a tragic past underneath his "brash exterior". Executive producer Dominic Treadwell-Collins explained that the show's bosses had "had Kush in [their] minds for a while" prior to the character's announcement, envisioning him as "a new leading man to spice up the market and set some female hearts fluttering". Treadwell-Collins also teased that it wouldn't be long before he had a female character "firmly in his sights". When asked about Kush's character, Ghadami said that the viewer would quickly get a "good idea" of Kush's personality, saying that the character originated from Essex and was a bit of an "Essex boy". He added that Kush is a "genuinely a nice guy [...] and he wants to get on with people", despite adding that Kush would "ruffle feathers" around Walford at first.

Kush is established to have connections in Walford, namely Sonia Fowler (Natalie Cassidy), as he was once close friends with her husband Martin (James Bye). Ghadami said of Kush's introduction that "He turns up on the Square and is setting up a market stall. He's in direct competition with a few others on the market. That's not a bad thing, though – there are some interesting relationships there and he manages to ruffle a few feathers from very early on". When talking about the character's relationship with the Masood family, Ghadami revealed that they would be present during his character's first scene and that Kush would get along well with Masood Ahmed (Nitin Ganatra) and begin an unexpected relationship with Shabnam Masood (Rakhee Thakrar). Speaking of the relationship, Ghudami said "His personality isn't completely compatible with Shabnam's and early on that shines through. He doesn't see it as a bad thing though and kind of enjoys it. He likes to speak his mind which isn't always appreciated".

Speaking of his role, Ghadami said he was "excited to be joining the cast of EastEnders" as he had been a fan of the show for a very long time. He continued by calling it "surreal" to work with actors that he had "spent so many evenings watching on television". Treadwell-Collins added that Ghadami was a "brilliant actor and a proper gentleman". Ghadami felt that Kush's personality similar to his own, which he commented was "easy to bring to the role". Kush went on to make his first appearance on 20 October 2014.

== Development ==
=== Romance with Shabnam Masood ===
==== Relationship, stillbirth and marriage ====
The relationship between Kush and Shabnam was first teased in December 2014, as Fatboy (Ricky Norwood) would challenge Kush to kiss her. Shabnam would initially be hesitant to embark on a relationship with Kush, causing her father to berate her for not having fun. Thakrar teased in early January 2015 that Kush would "tame" Shabnam, explaining that her character "doesn't want to want Kush because he is not the type of guy she would go for" as he is "cheeky and frivolous". Thakrar noted that during the early stages of Kush and Shabnam's relationship, her co-stars would sometimes tell her to "give him a chance". It was announced in late January 2015 that the characters would begin their relationship after sharing their first kiss. Thakrar revealed that the storyline of Kush and Shabnam's relationship was loosely based on the 1999 romantic comedy film 10 Things I Hate About You. Ghadami and Thakrar appeared on the ITV talk show Good Morning Britain to discuss the kiss after it aired. They believed the show had built up to it well and teased that there was more to come for the couple in the near future. In March 2015, the previously concealed relationship would become public knowledge in the Square.

Ghadami explained that Kush being a "nice guy" and Shabnam being a "hard nut to crack" was the base of their relationship, as his character enjoyed looking for Shabnam's more vulnerable side. Thakrar believed that Shabnam would eventually adopt Kush's more laid-back nature. The show announced that Kush and Shabnam would hold their engagement party in June 2015, with Shabnam's secret that she had a daughter, Jade Green (Amaya Edward), the whole time set to be revealed. Thakrar explained that Shabnam wanted the event to be "low key" and that Shabnam wanted a family more than marriage. During the engagement party, Kush proposed marriage to Shabnam, which Thakrar deemed "really romantic". Shabnam was announced to become pregnant from Kush in June 2015. In August 2015, the show announced that their baby was stillborn, with a stoyline focusing on Kush and Shabnam's grief set to follow. The storyline was described as "heartbreaking" before it commenced. The show worked with the charity Sands to help portray the story accurately. Despite struggling with the trauma of the ordeal, Shabnam remained excited to marry Kush, hastily planning the event.

Kush does have an optimism about the future and hopes that things will work out – as do I! Kush and Shabnam have been through a horrific trauma in losing their baby Zaair and you can't really have a bigger test in a relationship. But they see getting married as a way to rekindle what they had. They've come a long way together and even after everything, they're still standing hand in hand. The wedding is more conservative and low-key than originally planned. It's a way of keeping everything relatively under wraps after everything that's happened, which is a good thing in Kush's mind. Now he just wants to be able to move on and be a husband without any hindrance. But this is EastEnders we're talking about!

— Ghadami on Kush and Shabnam's relationship following the stillbirth of their son (2015)

==== Affair with Stacey Slater ====
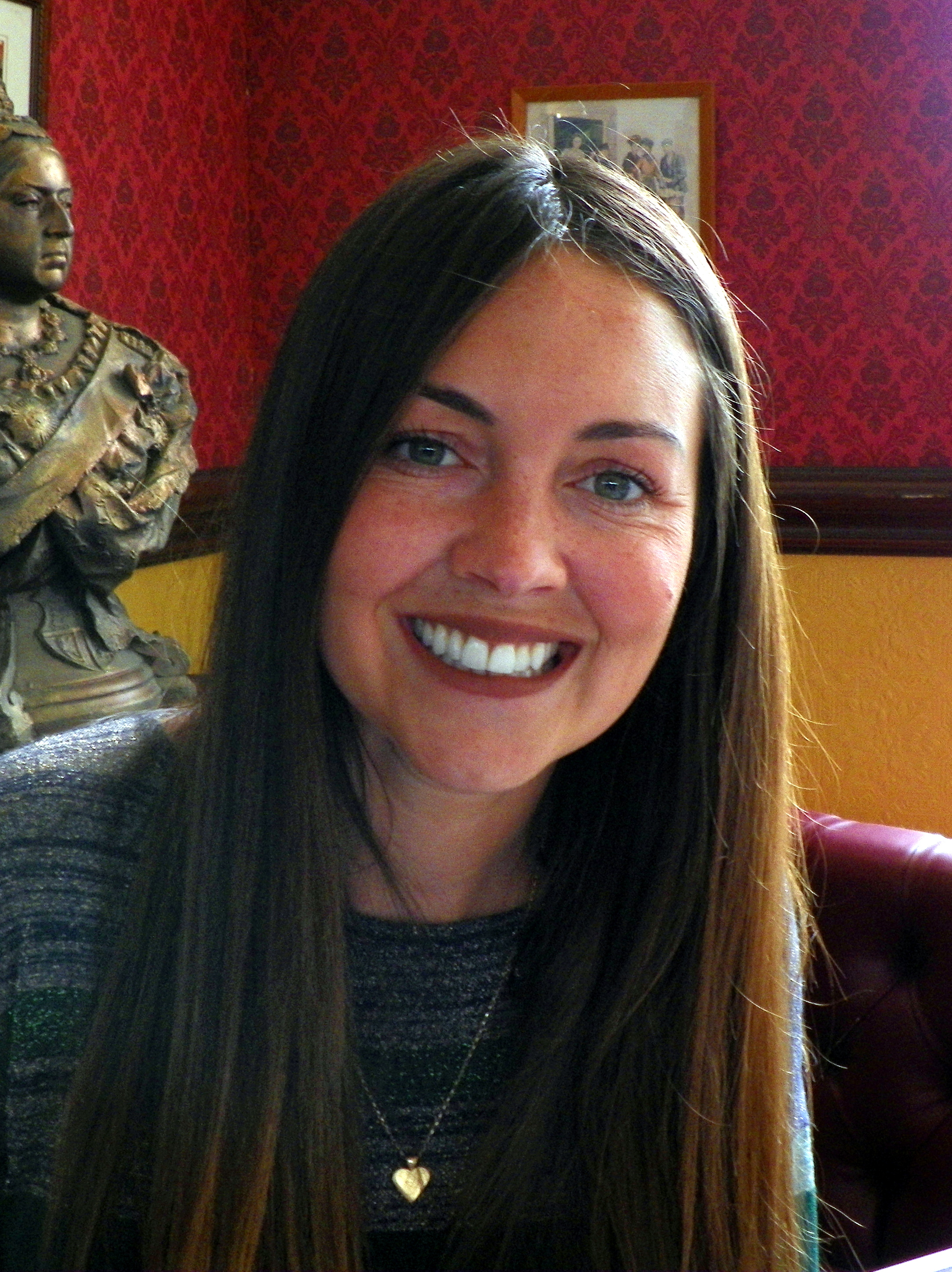
Kush's affair with Stacey (Turner, pictured) reportedly left Thakrar "jealous".

In May 2015, during Kush and Shabnam's engagement, Kush kissed Stacey Branning (Lacey Turner). Thakrar joked that she was "jealous" of Kush and Stacey's fling and that she was shocked when Treadwell-Collins told her about it. Ghadami noted that Thakrar could not look at or talk to him the same way after he shot the scenes with Turner, due to each actor's closeness with their character, as Thakrar added, laughing: "He came to me afterwards and I'd be like, 'Don't look at me'". The affair would result in Stacey becoming pregnant at the same time as Shabnam, believing her fiancé Martin Fowler was the father. Kush and Stacey's son, Arthur Fowler (Hunter Bell), was born in December 2015, with Martin and Shabnam set to discover the truth in January 2016. Thakrar made an unannounced exit in February 2016, as the affair with Stacey caused her character to no longer trust Kush and seek a fresh start. Thakrar explained the reasoning behind her character's decision to leave was because "she knows too well you can only avoid your child's [Jade's] existence for so long, and actually it's very damaging. She loves Kush, and when you truly love someone you do what's right for them, even if they don't know it at the time. Not to mention what it'd be like for Arthur to grow up not knowing the truth about his own blood. It's the right thing to do, and she wants to make things right".

=== Connection with Carmel Kazemi ===
In April 2015, the show announced that Kush's mother, Carmel Kazemi (Bonnie Langford), would join the show. She was described as a "loud and embarrassing" mother. Ghadami commented that he believes Kush and Carmel work well together and that Kush was used to having "strong women around him" as a result. Treadwell-Collins described the relationship between Kush and Carmel as Carmel being "A thoroughly modern Essex divorcée who isn't quite ready to cut the apron strings firmly attached to her son Kush. Even if it means clashing spectacularly with an already prickly Shabnam." The BBC Website detailed "Family is everything to Carmel – after her relationship ended badly with Umar, her husband, she is determined to ensure her 'little Kushy' settles down with the right woman". After Carmel became promoted to series regular, Ghadami hoped Kush's father Umar would also be introduced, teasing "We may well meet Kush's father at some point in the future. He's certainly there in the background, because of the way in which Carmel has come to Walford. But casting him would be a tough task, wouldn't it? Particularly after how well Bonnie has fitted in". He added that "if Kush's dad were ever to turn up, then bring it on! It would add another great aspect to Kush and Carmel's relationship".

=== Problem gambling and robbery ===
Throughout 2020, Kush became the centre of a storyline about problem gambling. The gambling storyline caused Kush to fall deep into debt. Ghadami explained that Kush enjoyed the "buzz" of gambling and that "He genuinely believes he's got what it takes to beat other people". The actor suggested that Kush's addiction was born as "certain people can get drawn to certain things to get by – even if you have a slight sensitivity towards something". He added that: "Being in a situation like lockdown is going to exacerbate that problem, With Kush, he found that little buzz that he was looking for. That little escape that maybe he needed. And one thing leads to another. It got to the point where it got a bit serious and he started to feel that buzz more strongly than he was expecting". Ghadami also noted that Kush didn't know he had an issue, believing his character was in denial.

In an attempt to fix his financial issues, Kush embarked on a robbery with the Mitchell family. The storyline saw Kush turn himself in to the police afterwards, which Ghadami attributed to Kush's love for his son, explaining: "I think Kush would rather serve his time and still see his son than to be on the run for the rest of his life, when it comes to it, he has a lot of love for his boy and I don't think he wants to miss seeing him grow up". After Kush was detained, Ghadami addressed that Kush was "caught between a rock and a hard place" between Arthur and doing the right thing.

=== Final fling and departure ===
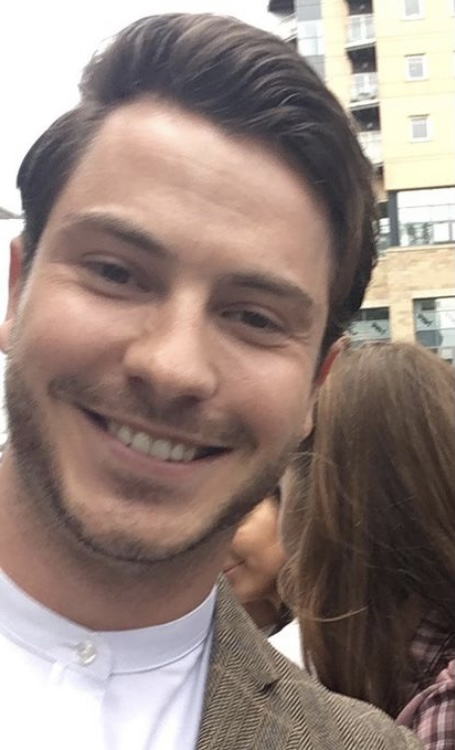
Gray (Smith, pictured) murdered Kush by shoving him in front of an oncoming train.

In September 2020, the show announced that Ghadami would depart from the show after six years as his contract wouldn't be renewed in 2021. Ghadami was informed of the news in January 2020. Kush's departure was set to be the culmination to a "huge plot" set to unfold "well into" 2021, with a show insider explaining: "Bosses have a huge plot planned, but although Davood was told in January, his departure is not for a very long time yet. In fact Kush will be on screen until well into 2021. It's a shame and he will be missed by everyone at Elstree but sometimes the cost of having a big storyline means losing big characters". Kush began dating Whitney Dean (Shona McGarty) in February 2021, to the rage of Gray Atkins (Toby-Alexander Smith), who had developed an obsession with Whitney beforehand. After Gray and Whitney had a shotgun wedding, and as Gray had murdered two characters, viewers feared Kush would also succumb to the same fate as his exit was on the horizon. The suspicions would prove to be correct as Gray would kill Kush by pushing him in front of a train after accusing him of ruining Whitney's life.

Ghadami filmed his final scenes in March 2021, admitting he was glad that he "couldn't hug his co-stars" due to Covid-19 social distancing as he "probably wouldn't let go" due to feeling sad about leaving. The actor disclosed that CGI was used in the episode, which is unusual for a soap opera, explaining: "It was very exciting to film this storyline, the set had been made specifically for this story and the CGI gave it an extra edge. To be part of something like that, that bold and that different, was a real privilege and a nice way to end my time on EastEnders". Speaking of his experience filming the scenes, Davood wrote: "Not going to lie, today was bittersweet. I had to say goodbye to some of THE best people I could ever wish to know. Not being able to do the usual hugs was tough, though probably for the best as I might not have let go. I'm a very lucky lad. Thanks to the ones who made the 6 and a half years so special. You know who you are. The pic might even hint subtly at who one of them is… thanks for the ride".

Ghadami said he found it "hard to say goodbye" and considered his character to be "best mate [he'd] ever had". He continued that he would miss working on the show and that being a regular had been a "blast", concluding by describing Kush as a "silly sausage" with "too big a heart" and noting that "it's in the bits just before and after they call 'action' where my favourite memories are". Despite feeling sad about his departure, Ghadami admitted he was happy to be leaving with a bang and hoped it would be a shocking moment for audiences, commenting: "I'll be sad to see Kush go, but I've loved every minute of playing him and I have really enjoyed this final storyline, I hope it surprised a few people because I don't think viewers were expecting it. The way and manner in which he leaves the show will hopefully be memorable for people and they'll be able to look back on it as a real shocking moment".

== Storylines ==
Kush causes disruption on his first day by trying to drive his van down Bridge Street, but ultimately makes friends due his laid-back personality. He is attracted to Shabnam Masood (Rakhee Thakrar), despite her coy nature, in an attempt to give Shabnam some Christmas spirit, he kisses her, but keeps this from his peers. Kush pushes Shabnam on her feelings for him, and she later has a one-night stand with him as she is upset over losing her job. She rejects him afterwards, feeling guilty for betraying her religious views, until Kush convinces her to start a relationship. They keep it a secret at first but when Shabnam's father Masood Ahmed (Nitin Ganatra) hears it from Donna Yates (Lisa Hammond), he is angry at them for keeping a secret. Shabnam persuades Masood to accept them but ends up lying that Kush has proposed to her. When he tells her that it is happening too fast, as they have only been dating a short while, Shabnam is devastated at her actions and Masood throws him out. Afterwards, Kush confides in Martin Fowler (James Bye) that he is not ready for another marriage after the death of his first wife, Safirah. At Donna's 30th birthday party, he gets drunk and when Shabnam tries to talk to him, he tells her that he is still grieving over the loss of his wife. Eventually, Shabnam admits that she does not want to get married; she only lied about the proposal because she loves him. They decide to take things more slowly. Masood comes round to this, but tells them that he does not want to see Shabnam getting heartbroken. However, Kush later proposes to Shabnam after learning of her daughter from Stacey Branning (Lacey Turner), whom he had earlier kissed.

After kissing Stacey a second time and regretting it, Kush finds out that Shabnam is five months pregnant with their child. He has initial doubts about this, but they soon begin planning their wedding. Seven months into her pregnancy, Shabnam's baby dies, leaving Kush heartbroken. Shabnam gives birth to their son, Zaair, but Kush is unable to cope and leaves the room. He visits Zaair later, cuddling him and telling him how proud he is. Shabnam and Kush argue because he was not there for her and she plans to move to Pakistan, while he considers returning to Essex with his mother Carmel Kazemi (Bonnie Langford). However, Carmel and Masood get them to reunite. Shabnam rearranges their wedding, hoping that being married will help them gain custody of her daughter Jade Green (Amaya Edward). Kush thinks they are marrying for the wrong reasons, but they agree that they love each other and want to marry. Before the wedding, Shabnam tells Kush that Stacey's baby is not Martin's, and Stacey tells him she thinks he could be the father. Stacey swears a reluctant Kush to secrecy and he marries Shabnam and departs with her for their honeymoon. When Kush and Shabnam return, Kush learns on the day of Jade's hearing that Shabnam took Jade without permission. Kush and Shabnam decide not to go for custody of Jade when they realise they have not come to terms with Zaair's death.

When Stacey's son Arthur Fowler is born, Shabnam thinks Kush could be the father from his behaviour, and confronts Stacey, worried she will lose her husband, but Stacey tells her he is not the father, so Shabnam finds Kush and passionately kisses him. However, Shabnam later hears Kush talking to Carmel about Arthur being his son, and Shabnam begins to re-evaluate her marriage. She wants to tell Martin the truth about Arthur's paternity, but when Stacey's mental condition worsens, she and Kush agree to wait and Kush vows to prioritise Shabnam over Arthur. Kush suggests to Shabnam that they move away, but she decides to leave on her own, urging Kush to stay for Arthur. Masood finds out about this and Arthur's paternity, so punches Kush and threatens to kill him if he comes near Shabnam again, and tells him that Shabnam has already decided to leave Walford. Kush then breaks down in Carmel's arms, thinking he has lost Shabnam for good. Despite Kush's pleas, Shabnam leaves Walford with Jade after planting a tree in Zaair's memory, telling Kush that they must lead separate lives, but she still loves him. Kush then starts drinking heavily and Martin finds out that Kush is Arthur's father. Stacey tells Kush that he can be a part of Arthur's life, but Martin disagrees and breaks his friendship with Kush. An emotional Kush has sex with Nancy Carter (Maddy Hill), but she suffers an epileptic fit in his bed. Kush calls Nancy's former boyfriend, Tamwar (Himesh Patel), who calls Kush selfish. Kush realises he is a bad role model so tells Stacey and Martin that he wants nothing to do with Arthur. Tamwar calls Carmel, who agrees to move in with Kush. Carmel then reveals to Kush that his father, Umar (Selva Rasalingam), has sold their house and she is homeless.

Kush develops feelings for Carmel's best friend Denise Fox (Diane Parish). They admit their feelings to each other and they have a brief fling, however, she ends it, fearing it will ruin her friendship with Carmel. Kush later discovers from Carmel that Denise is pregnant and believes he is the father, but Denise tells him he is not as she is 18 to 19 weeks pregnant. Kush later advises his younger brother Shakil Kazemi (Shaheen Jafargholi) when he wants to have sex with his girlfriend, Bex Fowler (Jasmine Armfield), who is Martin's daughter. When the explicit image Shakil sent to Bex goes viral around Shakil's school, Bex is blamed, even though Louise Mitchell (Tilly Keeper) was the one who sent it. This causes things to become fraught yet again between the Kazemis and the Fowlers. Kush pursues Denise again but she turns him down due to her friendship with Carmel. However, when Kush is in the fish and chip shop after having a drink with Denise, Martin's sister Michelle (Jenna Russell) crashes into it, leaving him unconscious. Denise helps rescue Kush, and while he is in hospital, she admits her feelings for him and they start a relationship. Back home, Carmel interrupts Kush and Denise one morning, but assumes that Kush has met a doctor from the hospital, which he confirms. Denise tells Kush that they should admit to their relationship from the start, so they tell Carmel, who is shocked, and says that when the relationship ends, she would be forced to take Kush's side and would lose her friend forever. Kush asks Denise to move in with him but she declines where Kush accuses her of comparing him to her controlling ex-husband, Owen Turner (Lee Ross). Kush storms off and goes into cardiac arrest in the middle of the market, and is diagnosed with Brugada Syndrome. Denise regrets rejecting him and spontaneously proposes to him in the hospital; he accepts. Later, Kush's other brother, Darius Kazemi (Ash Rizi), offers him work in Dubai, but Kush and Carmel are left devastated when Shakil, while returning a stolen bike taken by his friend Keegan Baker (Zack Morris), dies after being stabbed by a gang. When Kush and Denise end their relationship, he begins having a secret sexual relationship with Kat Moon (Jessie Wallace). The pair decide to keep it a secret due to the complicated relationship Kush has with the Slaters and Fowlers, but when they are caught having sex, they admit to being together. When Kush sees Whitney Dean (Shona McGarty) being harassed on a balcony by Leo King (Tom Wells), he rushes to her defence, and accidentally pushes Leo over the balcony. After being paid by Ruby Allen (Louisa Lytton) to run away with Arthur, Kat ends their relationship and he starts a new relationship with Whitney. Kush is killed on 19 April 2021 after being pushed in front of an oncoming train by Gray Atkins (Toby-Alexander Smith) as he attempts to flee to Dubai with Whitney and Arthur after informing the police of a car heist that took place in November 2020 involving the Mitchell family and Shirley Carter (Linda Henry). As Whitney took Arthur to the toilet, Gray confronted Kush and the two men had harsh words with Gray telling Kush that Whitney is his life. After a brief tussle Gray falls onto the track as a train approaches, Kush frantically tries to save Gray and pulls him up to safety, but Gray turns and shoves Kush onto the tracks where he is killed by the oncoming train. The next day, the residents mourn Kush, especially Whitney, Martin and Denise. Later, in The Queen Vic, Mick Carter (Danny Dyer) invites all of Kush's friends to raise a glass to their friend. Kush's body is flown to Dubai to buried near his family and Martin and Sonia fly over to attend the funeral. In March 2022, Gray is arrested for Kush's murder, as well as for the murders of his first wife Chantelle Atkins (Jessica Plummer) and Tina Carter (Luisa Bradshaw-White).

== Reception ==
Ghadami received several awards and nominations for his portrayal of Kush. At the 2015 British Soap Awards, he was nominated for "Best Newcomer" but lost to Jessica Regan (Niamh Donoghue, Doctors). At the 2015 Inside Soap Awards, Ghadami was nominated for "Sexiest Male" and shortlisted for "Best Affair" with co-star Lacey Turner, losing "Sexiest Male" to Michael Parr (Ross Barton, Emmerdale), and "Best Affair" to Parr and Charley Webb (Debbie Dingle, Emmerdale). In 2015, he won the TV Choice Award for "Best Soap Newcomer (Actor)". In 2016, Ghadami was nominated at the 21st National Television Awards for "Serial Drama Performance", but lost to Danny Dyer (Mick Carter, EastEnders). At the 2016 Inside Soap Awards, Ghadami was nominated for "Sexiest Male", losing to Charlie Clapham (Freddie Roscoe, Hollyoaks). He was also nominated for "Best Actor" at the 2016 British Soap Awards, losing to Danny Miller (Aaron Dingle, Emmerdale). At the 2017 British Soap Awards, he was again nominated for "Best Actor" but lost to John Middleton (Ashley Thomas, Emmerdale). He won "Sexiest Male" at the 2017 Inside Soap Awards. He was nominated for "Best Soap Actor" at the 2018 TV Choice Awards, losing to Danny Dyer. In 2019, he was nominated for "Serial Drama Performance" at the 24th National Television Awards, again losing to Dyer.

Tamara Hardingham-Gill of Metro reported that fans on Twitter were excited to see Kush and Stacey kiss. Danny Walker of Mirror called Shabnam and Kush's stillbirth "heartbreaking". Danny Walker of Mirror described Kush as a sex symbol, noting many viewers were pleased during scenes where the character was shirtless. Kush was described as a "hunk" and a "womaniser" by Dan Wiggins of MyLondon. Claire Lindsay of Metro called Kush "one of the few generally amiable guys in the [soap] genre". Sharnaz Shahid of Hello! considered Kush to be a "beloved" character. Kate Oates stated that Kush had been "hugely popular" across his stint.

Kush's death scene received generally negative reception. It received 106 viewer complaints due to "horrifying scenes". The topic of the complaints was listed as "violence". Louise Griffin of Metro called the scene a "shock". The decision for Kush to be killed by Gray was criticised by Calli Kitson of Metro, who labelled it a "complete mistake", expressing frustration with how it required Kush's problem gambling storyline to be dropped. Viewers were reportedly "devastated" by Kush's exit. Claire Lindsay (Metro) described the scene as "a quick gasp which served to further undermine a powerful story" and "unnecessarily gruesome", continuing that "the dispatching of Kush to give Gray a few more months of shelf life is just one in a long line of botched up death stories". After the scene aired, many viewers voiced their criticisms on Twitter about the death being too gruesome. Some criticised the plot device of CCTV cameras malfunctioning, believing it was too convenient to be plausible. Writing for Irish Mirror, Rose Hill reported that fans "were left sickened" by the scene, opining that the scene was "tragic".
