= Shabnam Masood =

Fictional character from the BBC soap opera EastEnders

- EastEnders character
- Rakhee Thakrar as Shabnam Masood (2014)
- Portrayed by: Zahra Ahmadi (2007–2008); Rakhee Thakrar (2014–2016)
- Duration: 2007–2008, 2014–2016
- First appearance: Episode 3401; 17 July 2007
- Last appearance: Episode 5224; 5 February 2016
- Created by: Diederick Santer
- Introduced by: Diederick Santer (2007); Dominic Treadwell-Collins (2014)
- Zahra Ahmadi as Shabnam Masood (2007)
In-universe information
- Other names: Shabnam Kazemi
- Occupation: Post office worker; Shop assistant; Pharmacist
- Father: Masood Ahmed
- Mother: Zainab Masood
- Stepfather: Yusef Khan
- Brothers: Syed Masood; Tamwar Masood; Kamil Masood
- Husband: Kush Kazemi (2015–2016)
- Sons: Zaair Kazemi
- Daughters: Jade Masood
- Uncles: Inzamam Ahmed; AJ Ahmed
- Nieces: Yasmin Masood
- First cousins: Jamila Inzamam; Ali Inzamam

Shabnam Masood (also Kazemi) is a fictional character from the BBC soap opera EastEnders, played by Zahra Ahmadi and later Rakhee Thakrar. Shabnam's first appearance was on 17 July 2007. Ahmadi made her final appearance as Shabnam on 24 October 2008. Shabnam returned to the show on 13 January 2014, after Thakrar assumed the role on 1 December 2013. After two years on the show, Thakrar made an unannounced exit as Shabnam on 5 February 2016.

Shabnam's storylines during her first stint in the show include a feud with her mother, Zainab Masood (Nina Wadia); friendships with Dawn Swann (Kara Tointon) and Carly Wicks (Kellie Shirley); her failed engagements with Muslim men; and her difficulty acknowledging her family and religious roots. During her second stint on the show, her storylines include a friendship with Stacey Branning (Lacey Turner); a relationship with Kush Kazemi (Davood Ghadami); the revelation that she has a secret daughter, Jade Green (Amaya Edwards), whose father is Dean Wicks (Matt Di Angelo); delivering a stillborn son named Zaair with Kush; and suspecting an affair between Kush and Stacey. Shabnam left Albert Square with Jade, leaving Kush behind, after she made the decision for him to stay with his son Arthur Fowler, whom he fathered with Stacey.

== Creation and development ==
=== Background ===
Shabnam Masood was one of several Asian characters introduced in 2007 by executive producer, Diederick Santer. She was first seen in July 2007, the episode after the introduction of her mother, Zainab (played by Nina Wadia), who became Walford's new postmistress. An EastEnders source commented: "Shabnam's definitely going to turn heads. She's 21, fresh from university and has no idea what she wants to do with her life. To keep her going, her mum gives her a job at the Post Office." Shabnam appeared intermittently until October 2007, when the Masood family, including Masood Ahmed and Tamwar Masood (Shabnam's father and brother), moved to a property on Albert Square and became regular characters.

The Masoods were the first Muslim family to join the show since the Karims, who appeared between 1987 and 1990, and they were the first Asian family to be introduced since the unsuccessful Ferreira family in 2003. Panned by critics and viewers, the Ferreiras were dismissed as unrealistic by the Asian community in the UK, and were eventually axed in 2005.

The introduction of more ethnic minority characters is part of producer Diederick Santer's plan to "diversify", to make EastEnders "feel more 21st century". Prior to 2007, EastEnders was heavily criticised by the Commission for Racial Equality (CRE), for not representing the East End's real "ethnic make-up". It was suggested that the average proportion of visible minority faces on EastEnders was substantially lower than the actual ethnic minority population in East London boroughs, and it therefore reflected the East End in the 1960s, not the East End of the 2000s. Furthermore, it was suggested that an element of "tokenism" and stereotyping surrounded many of the minority characters in EastEnders. The expansion of minority representation in EastEnders provides "more opportunities for audience identification with its characters, hence a wider appeal." Trevor Phillips, CRE chair, has said: "balanced representation of ethnic minority communities in the media matters. The industry has a key part to play in this, it is a powerful tool and can go a long way towards helping to build an integrated society."

=== Casting ===
Actress Zahra Ahmadi, a graduate from the Royal Welsh College of Music & Drama, was cast as Shabnam. She has commented: "I've watched EastEnders as long as I can remember and I'm really excited to be joining the cast. It was very surreal walking into the Square and seeing all the faces I'd grown up watching. I felt like I knew them". EastEnders executive producer, Diederick Santer, has said "Newcomer Zahra is a real find. She's warm and great fun. I'm confident the Masoods will be a big hit with viewers."

=== Departure ===
It was reported on 8 September 2008 that Zahra Ahmadi had quit her role as Shabnam. Ahmadi was quoted as saying: "I've made the tough decision to leave as I'm still young and I want to try other roles. But I'm really happy the door has been left open for me to return as it has been a great experience." Diederick Santer added: "Zahra is a fine actress, even though she's leaving, the door is always open for her to return. The Masood family have been a great addition to Albert Square so there's plenty more to come from them in future." The character made her exit in October 2008, leaving England to find her roots in Pakistan.

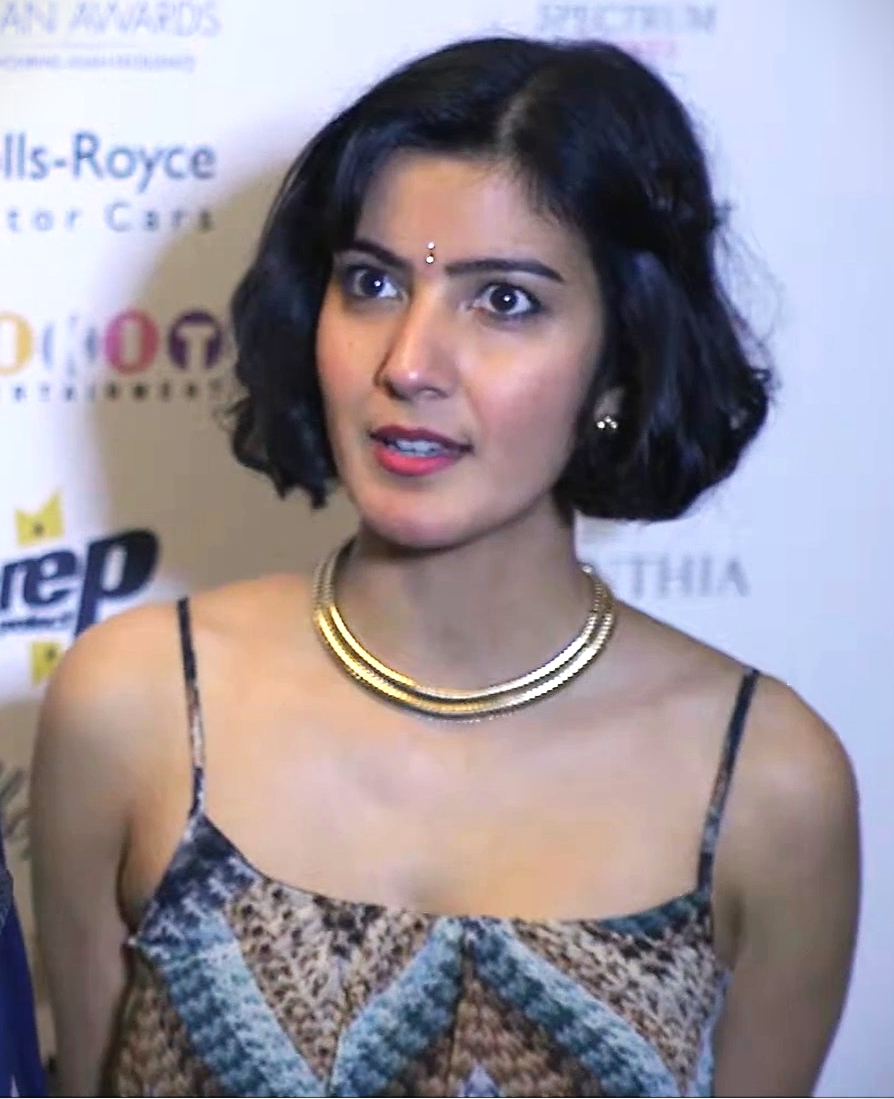
Rakhee Thakrar (pictured) was cast to play Shabnam in 2013.

=== Reintroduction and recast ===
It was announced on 1 December 2013 that Shabnam would return to EastEnders in January 2014, played by Rakhee Thakrar. Thakrar said of her casting: "Having grown up watching EastEnders with my family, I'm really excited to now be joining the show. I can't wait to become part of the Masood family and start working with the rest of the amazing EastEnders cast and crew." Shabnam returned to EastEnders on 13 January 2014.

=== Stillbirth ===
On 1 August 2015, Thakrar confirmed a stillbirth storyline for Shabnam and father-to-be Kush Kazemi, in which she realises that her baby has stopped moving. EastEnders worked with the Stillbirth and Neonatal Death Society (Now known as Sands) to produce the storyline. Speaking of the nature of the storyline, Thakrar commented: "In the UK, 3628 babies were stillborn in 2013, that's one in every 216 births; a shocking fact I've come to learn during my preparation for telling this story." She added: "It is an experience that profoundly changes a person's life forever, and we feel a heavy responsibility to tell the truth of this. Our hope is that we can encourage people to talk about their experiences and their babies that have died." Erica Stewart, Bereavement Support Services Manager at Sands, stated: "The death of a baby is rarely talked about. Many people shy away from the issue, others have a misconception that this is a thing of the past. We hope that with a TV drama as popular as EastEnders covering this heartbreaking experience, it will help to lift the taboo, and raise awareness of all the issues that surround the death of a baby. We worked closely with the writers and actors on this storyline. We really appreciate their dedication to ensuring that they portray the impact that the death of a baby has on bereaved families as truthfully as possible. Everyone involved has approached this storyline with incredible sensitivity."

The scenes featuring the stillbirth of baby Zaair took place commencing from 31 August 2015. The episode was watched by 6.2 million viewers on the night of its broadcast, and was met with a positive reception from fans. The episode in which Shabnam has a stillbirth was nominated for 'Best Single Episode' at the 2016 British Soap Awards but lost out to 'The Heart of England' from Doctors. Thakrar was also nominated for 'Best Actress' but lost the award to co-star Lacey Turner.

=== Second departure ===
On 5 February 2016, viewers saw Shabnam depart Walford with her long-lost daughter, Jade following the ending of her marriage to Kush. Thakrar's departure from the show was not announced. After the episode aired, Thakrar commented: "Every now and again a job and a group of people change your life. I can definitely say that about EastEnders. I'm so grateful for the chance to play Shabnam Masood and particularly her story. It feels like the right time for both myself and the character to move on. I'm very thankful for my time on the show. It's been brilliant." Thakrar also extended her thanks to executive producer, Dominic Treadwell-Collins and said she would miss co-stars Ganatra, Patel, Ghadami and Turner. She did not rule out a return to the show.

== Storylines ==
=== 2007–2008 ===
Shabnam, the daughter of Masood Ahmed (Nitin Ganatra) and Zainab Masood (Nina Wadia), appears initially as a university graduate, who is undecided what career path she wants to follow. She has aspirations to travel and makes plans to leave Walford but is forced to rethink when she discovers her parents are struggling financially. Shabnam's lack of direction, friendship with Dawn Swann (Kara Tointon) and recreational activities anger Zainab, causing friction between mother and daughter. Zainab tries to set Shabnam up with Jalil Iqbal (Jan Uddin) and invites him to stay with the family and work in their post office for a while. Shabnam is initially against this as she remembers Jalil as a "geek" from her childhood, though when she sees him, she is attracted to him. Zainab sets them up with a romantic meal, listening in on their conversation using a baby monitor. Shabnam discovers that Jalil has a girlfriend, though Zainab sees a picture of her and jokes that she is ugly and that her make-up looks like it has been done by Edward Scissorhands. Shabnam later bumps into Jalil on a night out in R&R nightclub, where they flirt. Jalil and Shabnam later share a kiss, but during a conversation with the Masood family, he comments that he thinks modern Muslim women like Shabnam provide "great entertainment" but are not marriage material. Zainab is greatly offended by this and sends him away.

Shabnam and Zainab have an argument about Shabnam's behaviour after Zainab catches her dancing in a club. Zainab is disappointed that Shabnam seems to want to embrace British culture more than her family's traditional Muslim culture. Zainab warns Shabnam about the dangers of going against her people's culture and society's rules, relaying an incident in Pakistan, where a girl was burnt as punishment by her family for secretly dating a boy her family felt was unsuitable. After hearing this story, Shabnam is unable to feel proud of her culture; however, Zainab has many positive things to say about the Muslim culture too. Shabnam feels confused; she does not know where she really belongs, so she leaves Walford to find her roots in Pakistan.

=== 2014–2016 ===
Shabnam returns to Walford after attending her grandmother's funeral, but leaves after arguing with Masood. She soon returns when she hears about Masood's downward spiral so she moves in with him and Tamwar. She gets a job working with Denise Fox (Diane Parish) at the local Minute Mart. A market worker, Kush Kazemi (Davood Ghadami), tries to impress her, but she is not interested. She befriends Stacey Branning (Lacey Turner). She soon gets closer to Kush, and they kiss and have sex. She tells Stacey that she had a daughter named Roya who she left on her aunt's doorstep and was adopted. The father is Dean Wicks (Matt Di Angelo). Shabnam develops feelings for Kush and when he gets her to admit it, he says he feels the same. They date in secret but Stacey finds out, and then Masood also finds out through gossip. Masood is against this, so Shabnam lies that Kush has proposed to her. Kush says it is happening too fast and Masood orders him to leave. Kush later admits that he is unable to commit as he is still mourning his dead wife. Shabnam admits that she only pushed their relationship through lying because she loves him. They resume their relationship and take things more slowly, and tell Masood of their plans, who comes round to the idea.

When still Kush refuses to commit, Shabnam enlists her aunt Fatima Inzamam's (Anu Hasan) help to find a husband, but she is dismissive of her suitor, Asim Hussain (Nitin Kundra), when he mentions children. Fatima tells Shabnam she knows about her child. When Shabnam sees Dean upset, she assumes that Stacey has told him he fathered her daughter. Shabnam shocks Dean by falsely claiming that their daughter died but he soon guesses that she is lying. Kush and Stacey grow closer and they kiss, and she tells him about Roya, which shocks him. After Kush asks Shabnam why she did not tell him, she decides to marry Asim but Kush interrupts and proposes marriage to her; she accepts. Dean's mother Shirley Carter (Linda Henry) finds out about Roya and tells Masood, who is furious with Shabnam. Fatima tells him where Roya, who is now called Jade Green (Amaya Edward), is. Shabnam meets Kush's mother Carmel Kazemi (Bonnie Langford) and gets on well with her but is angry when Masood reveals her secret, though Carmel is understanding. Dean exposes Shabnam's lies at her engagement party. She has a bitter argument with Masood and bans him from the wedding though they soon reconcile.

Shabnam is attacked by a gang of girls, and is found lying injured by Jade. In hospital, Shabnam tells Stacey that she felt no connection to her daughter when she saw her. Following an examination, Shabnam is informed that she is five months pregnant. She worries that Kush will leave her and believes she will be a bad mother, especially after Shirley's boyfriend and Dean's father Buster Briggs (Karl Howman) asks for her help in gaining custody of Jade. After Shirley tells her she will regret not knowing anything about her daughter, she tells Kush she is pregnant. Shabnam is unaware that Kush and Stacey have kissed. After she and Kush announce the pregnancy to their families, Shabnam decides to make a statement to the police about the girl gang, and tells Shirley she will support her and Buster in their attempt to gain custody of Jade.

Following Kush's stag party, Shabnam tells Masood she has not felt the baby move for a few days. Masood takes Shabnam to the hospital, where a doctor confirms the baby has died. Following an induction, Shabnam gives birth to her stillborn son, whom she names Zaair (which she states means "the visitor"). Grieving, Shabnam decides to return to Pakistan. Kush tries to comfort her, but she says they have no future and they fight about it. In anger, Kush tells Shabnam to leave and never come back. However, Carmel and Masood persuade them to reconcile for Zaair's funeral. When Shabnam sees Jade visiting Dean, she realises she wants Jade in her life. Kush protests over her suddenly making that decision so soon after Zaair's stillbirth, but she goes to Jade's social worker anyway and tells her that she wants Jade back. Shabnam and Kush marry, shortly after Shabnam discovers that Martin Fowler (James Bye) is not the father of Stacey's unborn baby. Unbeknownst to Shabnam, Kush has discovered that Stacey thinks he could be the father.

Shirley and Buster learn that Shabnam took Jade without permission and Shabnam pleads with them not to tell the judge, to which they agree. However, Shabnam and Kush decide that they are not ready to look after Jade as they are still grieving Zaair. Shabnam informs Shirley of her decision, and Shirley and Buster win custody of Jade. Shabnam sees Carmel give Stacey a gift and becomes suspicious. Shabnam secretly checks the gift, one of Kush's old babygros, and Stacey gives birth a son named Arthur Fowler. When Kush holds the baby, his behaviour makes Shabnam realise that he could be the father. She confronts Stacey about it, but Stacey says that Kush is not the father. Shabnam finds out that she has severe scarring in her uterus and is unlikely to conceive naturally. She turns to Jade for comfort.

Stacey disappears with Arthur, and Shabnam overhears Carmel and Kush talking about Arthur being his son. She tells Kush that he will resent her for not giving him the family that he desires, and although he pledges his love for her, she says she needs to be alone and tells him to be with Stacey, Martin and Arthur. Kush begs her not to leave, insisting that his love for her is real, so she decides that they should tell Martin the truth about Arthur's paternity. However, when Stacey's mental condition worsens, Shabnam and Kush decide to wait. Shabnam visits Stacey at the hospital and realises that Stacey wants to see Arthur, so she goes to Martin and proposes that they move Stacey and Arthur to a mother and baby care unit. While Martin and Shabnam begin to look for an available unit, Kush suggests they move away to start a new life together. Shabnam realises that Kush needs Arthur and urges him not to make the same mistakes that she made with Jade. She tells Kush that she will leave on her own, and tells Masood she plans to go to Pakistan. Carmel tells Masood it is Kush's fault because of Arthur's paternity. When Shabnam tells Jade that she is leaving, Jade says she is being abandoned again and dismisses Shabnam as her mother. Masood urges Shabnam to stay for her last chance to be a mother to Jade or she will never forgive herself. However, she changes her mind and tells Shirley, Buster and Jade that she is moving to a nearby borough so Jade can visit her at any time. She then plants a tree in Zaair's memory, and says her goodbyes to her family, after which Shirley and Buster tell her that they want Jade to live with her, which she accepts. Shabnam makes Kush recite the triple talaq to end their marriage, and although Shabnam says that they must lead separate lives, she admits she still loves him. Shabnam and Jade leave Walford in a cab.

In 2023, Dean tells Linda Carter (Kellie Bright) that Jade is in need of a transplant due to her cystic fibrosis. At first, Linda doesn't believe him. However, Whitney Dean (Shona McGarty) tells her that Stacey has phoned Shabnam, who has confirmed that Jade is indeed ill, and unless she gets a transplant, she may not live for much longer. Jade moves to Walford to be with Dean but Shabnam decides that she wants Jade to move with her to Pakistan, as Zainab is not well.

== Reception ==
Laura-Jayne Tyler from Inside Soap was disappointed to see Shabnam and her portrayer leave in 2016, but was happy that the character "won a happy ending with her daughter" and thought it was "remarkable" that Shabnam had not left Kush weeks ago. In 2016, Daniel Kilkelly from Digital Spy put Shabnam on his list of seven characters that left EastEnders too soon, writing, "EastEnders' rising star Rakhee Thakrar left our screens for good in February after deciding to quit the show, and we were absolutely gutted to see her go. Rakhee's popular character Shabnam Masood said her goodbyes after realising that it was time for a fresh start away from her cheating hubby Kush. And while it was refreshing to see Shabs refusing to be a doormat, we can't help but feel that she had so much more to offer." In 2020, Sara Wallis and Ian Hyland from The Daily Mirror placed Shabnam 66th on their ranked list of the best EastEnders characters of all time, writing that she had a "series of gritty storylines" in her second stint on the soap.

== See also ==
- List of fictional postal employees
