= 21st National Television Awards =

British awards ceremony in 2016

- Date: 20 January 2016
- Location: The O2 Arena, London
- Country: United Kingdom
- Presented by: Dermot O'Leary
- Website: http://www.nationaltvawards.com/

Television/radio coverage
- Network: ITV

The 21st National Television Awards were held at The O2 Arena on 20 January 2016. The awards were hosted by Dermot O'Leary.

== Performances ==
- Gloria Gaynor – "I Will Survive/Survivor"
- Fleur East – "More and More"
- Raya Yarbrough - "The Skye Boat Song"

== Awards ==
Category Presenter(s)	Winner	Nominated
"Challenge Show"; Presented by Ant & Dec	The Great British Bake Off (BBC One)	Bear Grylls: Mission Survive (ITV); MasterChef (BBC One); The Apprentice (BBC One)
"Drama"; Presented by Aidan Turner and Heida Reed	Downton Abbey (ITV)	Broadchurch (ITV); Casualty (BBC One); Doctor Who (BBC One)
"Entertainment Programme"; Presented by Lee Mack	I'm a Celebrity...Get Me Out of Here! (ITV)	Ant & Dec's Saturday Night Takeaway (ITV); Celebrity Juice (ITV2); The Graham Norton Show (BBC One)
"Serial Drama Performance"; Presented by Shane Richie and Jessie Wallace	Danny Dyer (Mick Carter, EastEnders)	Alison King (Carla Connor, Coronation Street); Michael Parr (Ross Barton, Emmerdale); Rakhee Thakrar (Shabnam Masood, EastEnders)
"Comedy"; Presented by Greg James	Peter Kay's Car Share (BBC One)	Benidorm (ITV); Birds of a Feather (ITV); Not Going Out (BBC One)
"Live Magazine Show"; Presented by Nadiya Hussain	This Morning (ITV)	BBC Breakfast (BBC One); Loose Women (ITV); The One Show (BBC One)
"Newcomer"; Presented by Rylan Clark-Neal	Shayne Ward (Aidan Connor, Coronation Street)	Gemma Atkinson (Carly Hope, Emmerdale); Richard Blackwood (Vincent Hubbard, EastEnders); Parry Glasspool (Harry Thompson, Hollyoaks)
"New Drama"; Presented by Maisie Williams	Doctor Foster (BBC One)	Humans (Channel 4/AMC); Ordinary Lies (BBC One); Poldark (BBC One)
"Daytime"; Presented by Piers Morgan and Susanna Reid	The Chase (ITV)	Pointless (BBC One); The Jeremy Kyle Show (ITV); The Paul O'Grady Show (ITV)
"TV Presenter"; Presented by Boy George	Ant & Dec	Graham Norton; Mel & Sue; Rylan Clark
"International"; Presented by Fred Sirieix	The Big Bang Theory (E4/CBS)	Game of Thrones (Sky Atlantic/HBO); Orange is the New Black (Netflix)
"Drama Performance"; Presented by James Nesbitt	Suranne Jones (Doctor Foster)	Aidan Turner (Poldark); David Tennant (Broadchurch); Sheridan Smith (Black Work)
"Factual Entertainment"; Presented by Jamie Oliver	Gogglebox (Channel 4)	DIY SOS: The Big Build (BBC One); Paul O'Grady: For the Love of Dogs (ITV); Top Gear (BBC Two)
"Serial Drama"; Presented by Ian Lavender and Blake Harrison	EastEnders (BBC One)	Coronation Street (ITV); Emmerdale (ITV); Hollyoaks (Channel 4)
"Talent Show"; Presented by Martin Kemp and Tony Hadley	Strictly Come Dancing (BBC One)	Britain's Got Talent (ITV); The Voice UK (BBC One); The X Factor (ITV)
"Impact Award"; Presented by Dermot O'Leary	Aidan Turner (Poldark)	
"Special Recognition"; Presented by Dustin Hoffman	Billy Connolly	
