= Davood Ghadami =

English actor (born 1982)

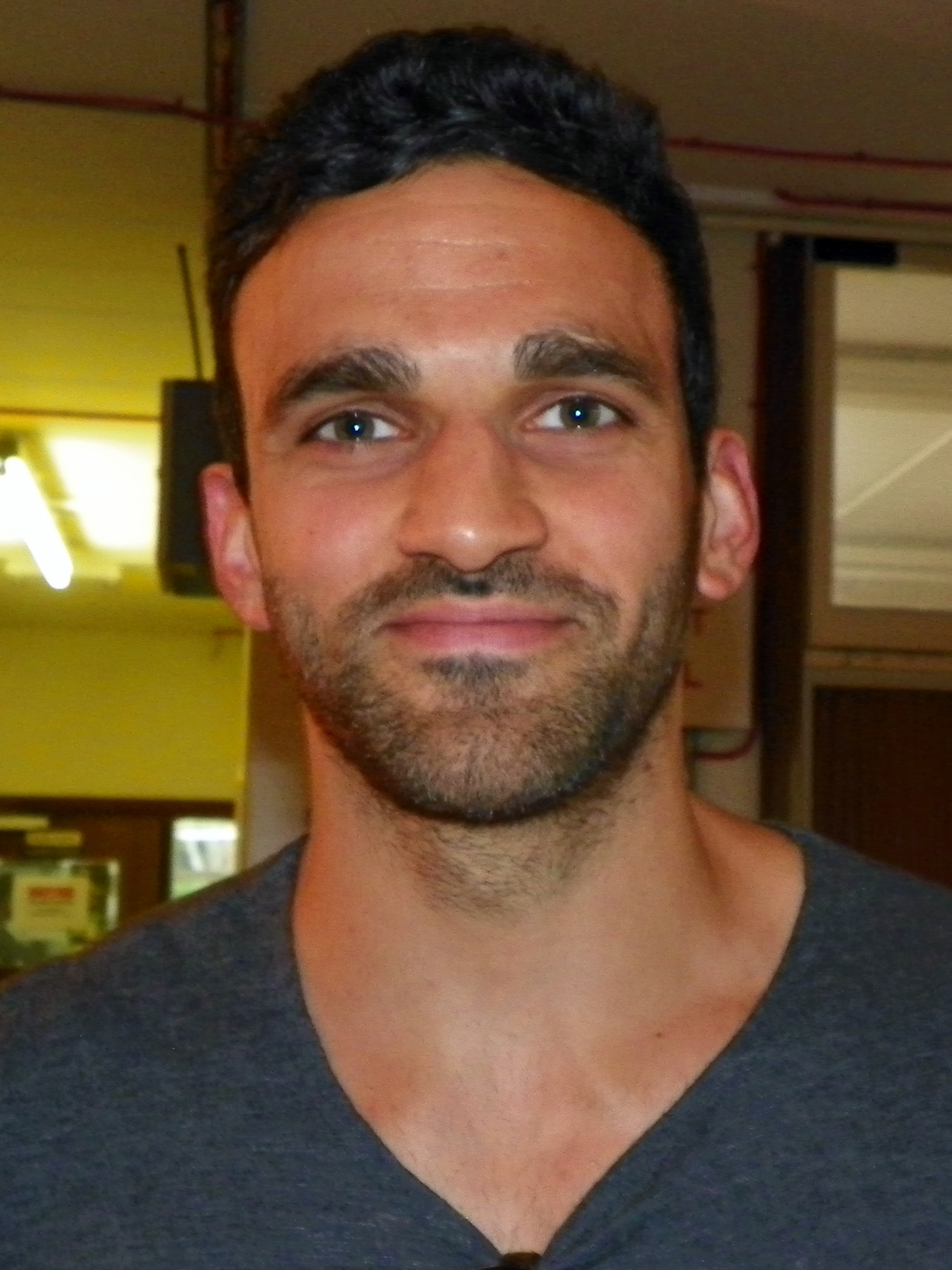
- Ghadami in 2016
- Born: 13 June 1982 (age 44); Harlow, Essex, England
- Occupation: Actor
- Years active: 2004–present
- Known for: Taggart; Doctors; Casualty; EastEnders; Holby City
- Spouse: Isobel Ghadami (m. 2010; sep. 2023)
- Children: 2

Davood Ghadami (Persian: داوود قدمی; born 13 June 1982) is a British actor. Following his appearances in Taggart in 2010, he appeared in the BBC medical programmes Doctors and Casualty in recurring roles. In 2014, he began playing Kush Kazemi in the BBC soap opera EastEnders, a role he stayed in until 2021 when the character was killed off. Following Ghadami's departure from EastEnders, it was announced that he had joined the cast of the BBC medical drama Holby City as Eli Ebrahimi.

== Early and personal life ==
Ghadami was born on 7 August 1982 in Harlow, Essex. He is of Iranian descent. He found it difficult at school, since being mixed race led to verbal bullying. He subsequently moved to Saint Nicholas School in Old Harlow. From 2010 to 2023, he was married to Isobel, they have two daughters.

== Career ==
In 2010, Ghadami played Duncan Clark in the final series of the ITV detective drama Taggart. He found the role challenging, since it involved looking at photos of genuine crime scenes. Following this, he appeared in the BBC soap opera Doctors in the recurring role of Aran Chandar from 2012 to 2013.

From 2013 to 2014, he appeared in the BBC medical drama Casualty as Ramin Tehrani. Other television credits include Life's Too Short, Law & Order, Skins Redux, Doctor Who, Top Boy, Fast Freddie, Silent Witness, Criminal Justice and Spooks.

On stage, he has played Amir in 13 at The National, as well as working for York Theatre Royal and Pilot Theatre.

In 2014, Ghadami joined the cast of EastEnders as series regular Kush Kazemi, for which he won the award for Best Newcomer at the TV Choice Awards. He was also nominated for Best Newcomer and Best Actor at The British Soap Awards.

In August 2017, Ghadami was announced as a contestant for the fifteenth series of Strictly Come Dancing. He was partnered with professional dancer Nadiya Bychkova. They were eliminated in week 11 of the competition, in the quarter-finals.

In April 2021, it was announced that Ghadami had joined the cast of the BBC medical drama Holby City as Eli Ebrahimi.

== Filmography ==
Year	Title	Role	Notes
2005	Casualty	Mero Hashid	2 episodes
2005	The Bill	Faz	Episodes: "Confessions of a Killer" and "Inferno"
2006	Spooks	Prince Wissam	Episodes: "Hostage Takers: Parts 1 & 2"
2006	Dream Team	Izmet	Episode: "Trust"
2007	The Omid Djalili Show	Mafia Guy	4 episodes
2009	Doctors	Tariq Kalbasi	2 episodes
2009	Criminal Justice	Josh Hughes	2 episodes
2010	Bloody Foreigners	Plautinianus	Episode: "The Untold Invasion of Britain"
2010	Taggart	Duncan Clark	Series 27; 6 episodes
2011	Doctor Who	Jim	Episode: "Let's Kill Hitler"
2011	Top Boy	Teacher	1 episode
2012–2013	Doctors	Aran Chandar	Recurring role
2013	Silent Witness	Ali Kolathi	Episodes: "Trust: Parts 1 and 2"
2013	Life's Too Short	Waiter	Episode: "Easter Special"
2013	Skins	Raj	Episodes: "Fire: Parts 1 & 2"
2013	Law & Order: UK	Russell	Episode: "Paternal"
2013–2014	Casualty	Ramin Tehrani	Recurring role
2014–2021	EastEnders	Kush Kazemi	Regular role; 641 episodes
2015	Valentine's Kiss	Greg	Miniseries; 1 episode
2017	Strictly Come Dancing	Himself	Contestant (series 15)
2020	EastEnders: Secrets from the Square	Himself	Episode: "Martin and Kush"
2021–2022	Holby City	Eli Ebrahimi	Regular role
2022	The Chelsea Detective	Nitin Shamsie	Series 1
2023	Beyond Paradise	Ben Tyler	1 episode
2023	Casualty	Eli Ebrahimi	Episode: "How to Save a Life"
2025	House of David	Eliab	Main cast
2026	Father Brown	Howie Brooks	Episode: "The Hole in My Heart"

== Awards and nominations ==
Year	Award	Category	Work	Result	Ref.
2015	2015 British Soap Awards	Best Newcomer	EastEnders	Nominated	
2015	Inside Soap Awards	Sexiest Male	EastEnders	Nominated	
2015	Inside Soap Awards	Best Affair (with Lacey Turner)	EastEnders	Shortlisted	
2015	TV Choice Awards	Best Soap Newcomer	EastEnders	Won	
2016	21st National Television Awards	Serial Drama Performance	EastEnders	Nominated	
2016	2016 British Soap Awards	Best Actor	EastEnders	Nominated	
2016	Inside Soap Awards	Sexiest Male	EastEnders	Nominated	
2017	2017 British Soap Awards	Best Actor	EastEnders	Nominated	
2017	Inside Soap Awards	Sexiest Male	EastEnders	Won	
2018	TV Choice Awards	Best Soap Actor	EastEnders	Nominated	
2019	24th National Television Awards	Serial Drama Performance	EastEnders	Nominated	
