= Zahra Ahmadi =

British actress

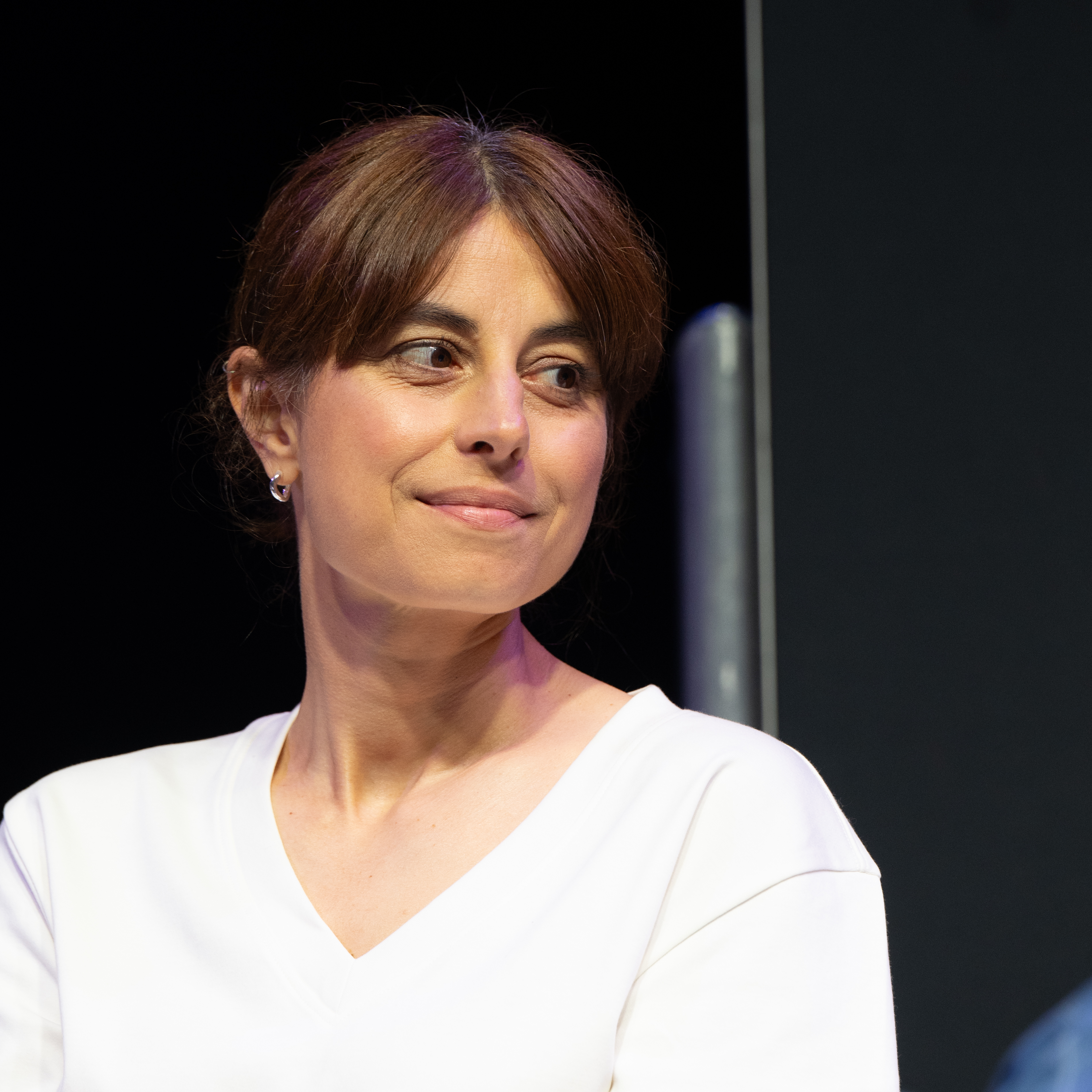
- At MCM London Comic Con, 23 May 2026
- Born: 1982 (age 43–44); Plymouth, Devon, England
- Education: Royal Welsh College of Music & Drama
- Occupation: Actress
- Years active: 2003–present

Zahra Ahmadi (Persian: زهرا احمدی; born 1982) is a British actress. She is best known for playing the original Shabnam Masood in EastEnders (2007-2009) and DS Esther Williams in Beyond Paradise (2023–present).

== Career ==
She is of Persian descent. She is known for her role as Shabnam Masood in the British television series EastEnders from 2007–2008. In 2008, she appeared on an EastEnders-themed episode of The Weakest Link where she was voted off in the seventh round.

She played Sabia in Britz following which she played Nasreen in King of Hearts at the Hampstead Theatre. She appears in the IFC series The Increasingly Poor Decisions of Todd Margaret and also appeared in the 2010 film Tamara Drewe. In 2013 she appeared in a small role in Doctor Who episode "Nightmare in Silver", and in 2014 she portrayed the role of Gita in the feature-length Christmas special of Black Mirror entitled "White Christmas".

From 2013 to 2017, she played Sinem in all three series of the BBC Two sitcom Count Arthur Strong.

In 2016, she appeared in 5 episodes of Berlin Station. In 2018, she played Sameera in Bliss, a Sky One comedy drama about a cheating travel writer who tries to balance his two chaotic family lives. Also in 2018, she played Daisy Anderson in season 7, episode 5 of Death in Paradise before taking on the role of DS Esther Williams in the 2023 spin-off series, Beyond Paradise.

== Filmography ==
=== Film ===
Year	Title	Role	Notes
2010	Tamara Drewe	Nadia Patel	
2013	Closed Circuit	Woman on Cellphone	
2018	A Bad Penny	Card Woman	
2022	Scale	Eden (voice)	French animated short film

=== Television ===
Year	Title	Role	Notes
2006–2007	Trial & Retribution	DC Imedla Folks	2 episodes: "Sins of the Father: Parts 1 & 2"
2007	Britz	Sabia Iqbal	2-part serial: "Part One: Sohail's Story" and "Part Two: Nasima's Story"
2007–2008	EastEnders	Shabnam Masood	64 episodes
2009	Doctors	Keera Chaudhury	Episode: "The Wall"
2010	Bellamy's People	Various	6 episodes
2010–2016	The Increasingly Poor Decisions of Todd Margaret	Mehtap	6 episodes
2012	The Thick of It	Nurse	Episode: "#4.4"
2013	The Mimic	Police Woman	Episode: "#1.3"
2013	Love Matters	Priya	Episode: "A Nice Arrangement"
2013	Doctor Who	Missy	Episode: "Nightmare in Silver"
2013	The Job Lot	Karen Ellwell	Episode: "#1.4"
2013–2017	Count Arthur Strong	Sinem	Main role, 20 episodes
2014	Black Mirror	Gita	Episode: "White Christmas"
2014	Babylon	Yasmina	Mini-series, Episode: "London"
2016	Josh	Gemma	Episode: "Bed & Breakfast"
2016	Berlin Station	Clare Itani	Recurring role (season 1); 5 episodes
2016–2017	Porridge	Dr. Tessa Marsden	3 episodes: "Porridge", "The Minder" and "The Listener"
2016–2018	Tracey Ullman's Show	Various	7 episodes
2017	Love Youn Be Hota Hay	?	Mini-series
2017–2018	Tracey Breaks the News	?	4 episodes
2018	Death in Paradise	Daisy Anderson	Episode: "Murder on the Day of the Dead"
2018	Innocent	DS Mari-Luz Garcia	Mini-series, 4 episodes
2018	Bliss	Sameera	Episode: "#1.1"
2018	Sky Comedy Shorts	Diana	Episode: "Kris Marshall's Whodunnit"
2018	Informer	Naeemah Jones	Episode: "Ruby Tuesday"
2020	Marcella	Sadie	Episode: "#3.4"
2020–2021	The Beast Must Die	Saima	3 episodes: "#1.1", "#1.3" and "#1.5"
2022	The Bay	Shazia Riaz	Series 3; 5 episodes
2022	Dodger	Fatima	Episode: "Mummy"
2022	Kate & Koji	Melanie	Episode: "Lockdown Legends"
2022	Riches	Parul	Episode: "Wrong and Strong"
2023–present	Beyond Paradise	DS Esther Williams	Main role, 27 episodes
2026	Betrayal	Mehreen Askari-Evans	
