= Mick Carter =

Fictional character from EastEnders

- EastEnders character
- Danny Dyer as Mick Carter (2014)
- Portrayed by: Danny Dyer (2013–2022); James Roberts (2020 flashback)
- Duration: 2013–2022
- First appearance: Episode 4769/4770; 25 December 2013
- Last appearance: Episode 6615; 25 December 2022
- Created by: Dominic Treadwell-Collins
- Introduced by: Dominic Treadwell-Collins
In-universe information
- Other names: Michael Carter
- Occupation: Pub landlord; Barman
- Father: Buster Briggs
- Mother: Shirley Carter
- Brothers: Dean Wicks
- Half-brothers: Jimbo Wicks
- Half-sisters: Carly Wicks
- Wife: Linda Carter (2016–2022); Janine Butcher (2022)
- Sons: Lee Carter; Johnny Carter; Ollie Carter
- Daughters: Frankie Lewis; Nancy Carter
- Stepdaughters: Annie Carter; Scarlett Butcher
- Grandsons: Michael Carter
- Grandfathers: Stan Carter
- Grandmothers: Sylvie Carter
- Aunts: Tina Carter
- Nephews: Jimmy Wicks
- Nieces: Jade Masood
- First cousins: Zsa Zsa Carter
- Other relatives: Babe Smith

Mick Carter is a fictional character from the BBC soap opera EastEnders played by Danny Dyer, making his first appearance in the show in the episode originally broadcast in the United Kingdom on 25 December 2013. Dyer's casting was announced on 1 October 2013 with that of his on-screen partner, Linda Carter (Kellie Bright). He is the son of established character Shirley Carter (Linda Henry) and is a member of the Carter family. Mick immediately becomes the new landlord of The Queen Victoria public house, bringing Linda, their son Johnny Carter (Sam Strike) and pet bulldog Lady Di (Hot Lips) with him. They are later joined by daughter Nancy Carter (Maddy Hill), son Lee Carter (Danny Hatchard) and other members of the extended family. In January 2022, it was announced that Dyer had quit the show after nine years in the role of Mick, and his final scenes aired on 25 December 2022.

The character was created by Dominic Treadwell-Collins, who came up with the idea of the Carter family before he became the executive producer of EastEnders. The character was influenced by Treadwell-Collins' own father. Dyer was asked to play Mick and he accepted because the role was not typical of other roles he has played, and he was happy that Mick's partner would be played by Bright. Mick is described as a family man who is patriotic and kind, and it was said that he has a good partnership with Linda but they fight "like teenagers". Dyer has based the character of Mick on former Queen Vic landlord Frank Butcher (Mike Reid).

Mick's storylines have included overcoming his fear of water, taking the blame for soliciting after being arrested, the discovery that Shirley is not his sister but actually his mother, coping with Linda's rape by his brother Dean Wicks (Matt Di Angelo), the death of his grandfather Stan Carter (Timothy West) from terminal cancer, becoming a father to Ollie Carter, blaming Nancy when Ollie is seriously injured during a fight between her and Lee, discovering that Lee instigated a robbery at The Queen Vic, ongoing financial issues and developing feelings for his daughter-in-law, Whitney Carter (Shona McGarty). Dyer took a short break from the show in early 2017. Mick has also feuded with former friend Stuart Highway (Ricky Champ) and was framed by Stuart for his attempted murder. Since then, he has supported his wife through her alcoholism, leaving the Queen Vic and finding out he has a daughter after he was sexually abused as a child by Katy Lewis (Simone Lahbib). In 2022, Mick's marriage to Linda finally ended after she sent him divorce papers, at the instigation of Janine Butcher (Charlie Brooks), with whom Mick develops a relationship. He then married Janine in December 2022, but reunites with Linda on Christmas Day after Janine's lies are exposed. Their happiness, however, is short lived when Mick is lost at sea after attempting to rescue Linda during a car accident. In November 2026, Mick's body is allegedly discovered off-screen, effectively confirming his death, though this was revealed as a lie, in a scam orchestrated by Janine.

Dyer's casting received a mixed response, with Daniel Kilkelly from Digital Spy feeling positive about the new character but calling it a risk, as Dyer is so well known, Vicky Prior from the Metro saying Dyer could be "the saviour of the soap". Several critics, as well as Dyer himself, hoped that he would help increase the show's ratings, but the casting was criticised by domestic violence charities because of previous comments Dyer was alleged to have made. Dyer has won several awards for the role, including the TV Choice Award for Best Soap Actor in 2014 and the National Television Award for Outstanding Serial Drama Performance in 2015, 2016 and 2019.

== Development ==
=== Casting and introduction ===
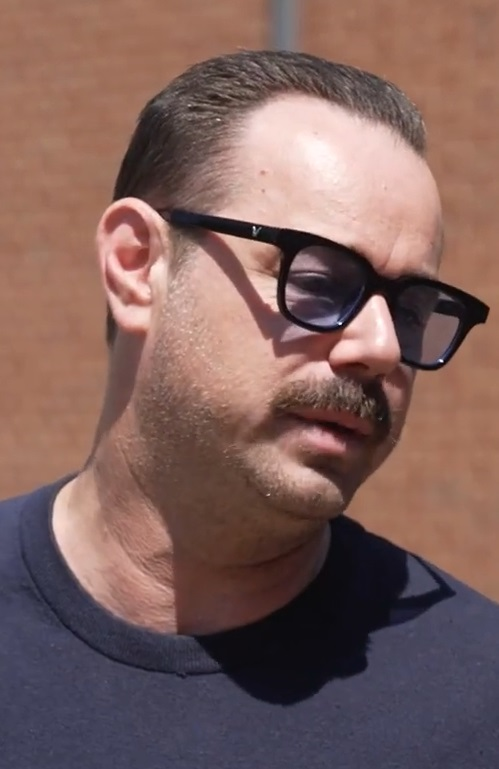
Danny Dyer was cast as Mick Carter in 2013.

On 1 October 2013, it was announced that Danny Dyer had been cast in the role of Mick Carter, the younger brother of established character Shirley Carter (Linda Henry), who joined EastEnders in 2006, and Tina Carter (Luisa Bradshaw-White), whose casting was announced 12 days earlier. Dyer was asked to be in EastEnders, and said that production staff "told me how brilliant I was" and "I felt really honoured", but he said he "thought long and hard" about accepting the role, doing so because it was "at the right time in my career." He also said he accepted the role because it was not "too obvious" and would be a double act with Mick's wife Linda Carter, saying, "it was a big deciding factor when they [said] that my screen wife Linda was going to be played by Kellie Bright." He began filming later in October, along with Bright. The character was to be the new landlord of the "iconic" Queen Victoria public house (also known as The Vic), appearing from Christmas Day, 25 December 2013. The Carters are the first new family to join the series and immediately take over the pub, and it was said that the family would become "a new EastEnders dynasty."

Dominic Treadwell-Collins was appointed executive producer of EastEnders in August 2013, but in December 2013, he said that Mick and Linda "were in my head about a year and a half ago", adding that they are influenced by his own parents. For Mick's announcement, Treadwell-Collins said: "I'm so excited to have actors of Danny and Kellie's calibre joining what is an already strong and talented company of actors." Dyer said at the time of the announcement, "I am so excited about starting a new chapter in my career and cannot wait to become part of the East End family." Later in the same month, Dyer said that becoming the new pub landlord was "like the perfect marriage. To take over The Queen Vic on Christmas Day, to be on primetime TV on the BBC's flagship show... I want to show people what I can do." Dyer said that he was not nervous joining EastEnders, but that he was excited and "can't wait for everyone to see me in the Vic". The programme had suffered falling ratings in 2013, and Dyer told Inside Soap that he wanted to "help turn EastEnders around". When asked by Heat if he would be "the saviour" of EastEnders, he said that he would, and said, "a lot of people were excited about me going to EastEnders [but] there's a lot of people who want to see me fail", adding that it was a risk that "could work or couldn't work". Controller of BBC One, Charlotte Moore, said in December 2013 that Dyer "is an extraordinary presence on the set of EastEnders—it's very exciting. He's just a big, big character and bringing him into the Vic is going to change a lot of the dynamics of EastEnders". Shane Richie, who plays previous landlord Alfie Moon, said Mick and the rest of the Carters would "change the dynamics of the Queen Vic", confirming that their arrival was "the big Christmas storyline".

Other members of the EastEnders cast, including Rita Simons (Roxy Mitchell), Jake Wood (Max Branning), Jacqueline Jossa (Lauren Branning) and Adam Woodyatt (Ian Beale), welcomed Dyer to the cast via social networking website Twitter. Jamie Lomas, who plays Jake Stone, said he was "absolutely made up" that Dyer was joining the show, while Samantha Womack (Ronnie Mitchell) said she "can't wait to see [him] pulling pints at the Vic" Womack later said Dyer's casting was a "bold move" by Treadwell-Collins, opining that this was "exactly what the show needs", adding "we need proper East End characters, we need larger than life personalities. [Dyer's] a fantastic actor but he's also incredibly charismatic." Shona McGarty, who plays Whitney Dean, said she "can't wait to work with Danny Dyer. I have an inkling that Whitney will have some scenes with the Carters. I've been chatting with Danny on Twitter, and he's such a legend." Dyer took to Twitter to thank people for their support, stating that "my dreams have come true".

Dyer, who is from East London where EastEnders is set, had previously been offered a role in the soap in 2009, but turned it down, fearing the level of publicity it would bring. He also said he turned down a 10-episode role in EastEnders because it was an "obvious gangster bully" who would be "blown up by Phil Mitchell". Dyer also revealed that he was approached to play Carl White, but turned it down. He said, "if I'd gone down that route, then I wouldn't be playing the role I am now." Richie, experienced at playing a landlord in the show, mentored Dyer and helped him on the pub set because he "couldn't even open the f***ing till". He was also trained in how to use a beer engine. After Dyer had been filming for a month, he stated that he was "bringing something to soap land that's never been seen before" and said that taking over The Queen Victoria was "a big responsibility" that he was ready for, adding "I don't want to let them down". He said that his character's entrance to the show was "flawless, but it's not going to be what you expect", and felt that he would have the same impact as original landlord Den Watts (Leslie Grantham). He also thought that his role would be controversial, because of the baggage that comes with him as an actor. Inside Soap said that the success of Mick, the Carter family and the pub all rest on Dyer's shoulders, of which Dyer said put pressure on him but he added that "there should be pressure coming into a show like this. I didn't want to come in as some peripheral character". He hoped that people would find Mick believable and loveable.

Three "sting" trailers for Christmas in EastEnders were released on 5 December 2013, one showing Dyer's face and the caption "It's all about to change". Two pictures from Dyer's first episode were also released on 5 December, one showing Mick and members of his family outside The Queen Victoria, and the other showing Mick holding open the pub's doors. Further pictures from Dyer's first episodes and more promotional shots were released on 7 December. A 45-second trailer for the Christmas 2013 storylines was released on 10 December, showing Dyer in his role.

=== Characterisation and appearance ===
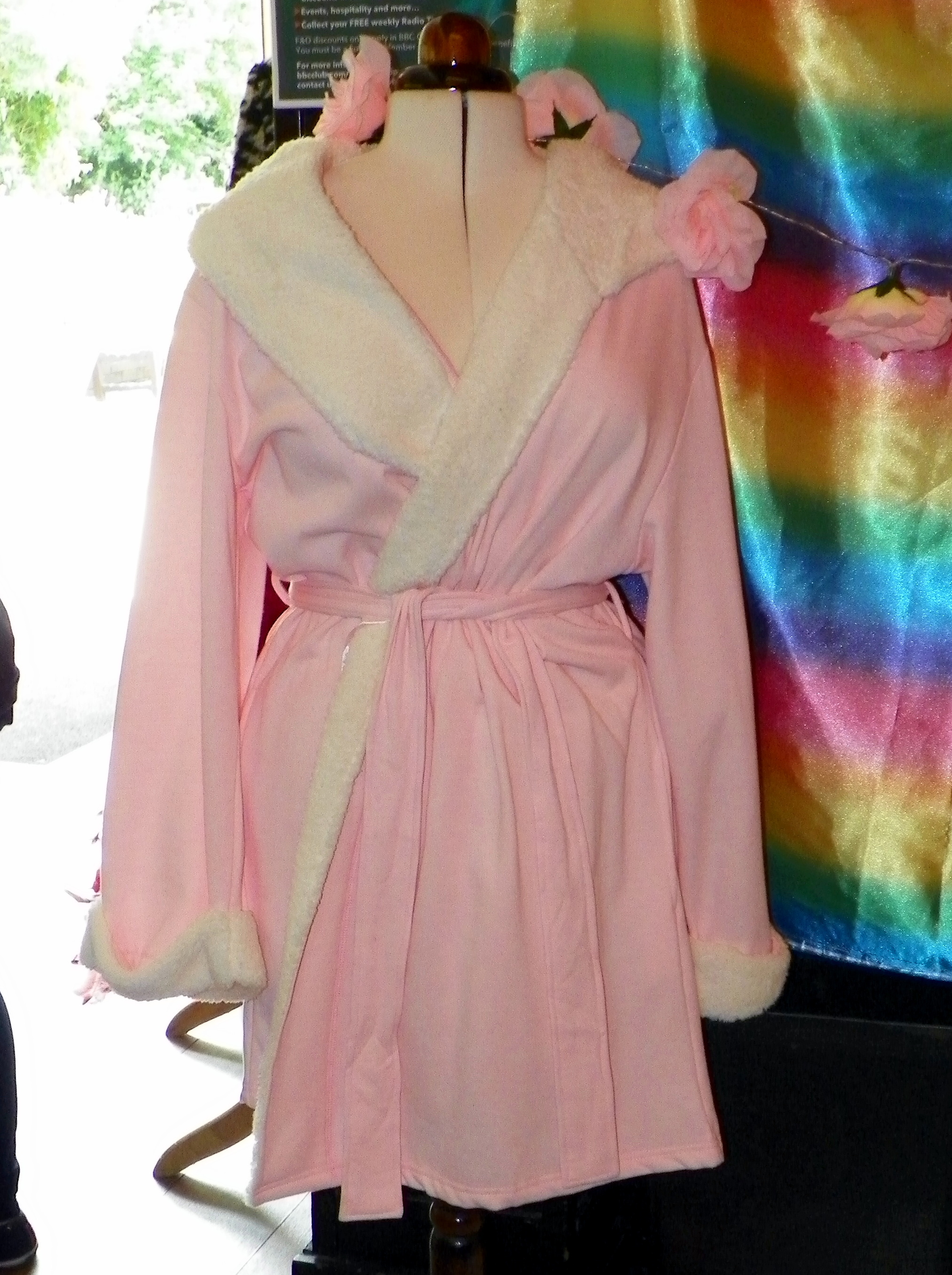
Pink dressing gown costume from EastEnders, said to belong to Linda Carter (Kellie Bright) but usually worn by Mick, including for their wedding, on display at the EastEnders Meet and Greet event.

Mick was described by the BBC as a patriotic family man, who is a "big softie" after spending most of his life around women. He was called a "bloke's bloke" and "kind hearted". Dyer said that Mick is in touch with his feminine side, and is "the alpha male of the show without being a bully", and said it was "not in an obvious way". He felt it was important that Mick was a family man, and called him a "grafter". He called him a "normal guy" who is protective of his family. When he appeared on ITV panel show Celebrity Juice, he described Mick as "a lovely fella" who is "not a villain." He said that Mick would be a "completely different landlord" to Alfie, and said the character has "a bit of [Frank] Butcher about [him]". All About Soap stated that he was "no bad boy". Shane Richie said that Mick is "not the hardman, but there is an element of that just underneath". Inside Soap said that Mick's battles are only verbal. They reported that Mick is enthusiastic about running his pub and has a "proper, old-school cockney attitude". Dyer said that he wanted viewers to be confused by Mick's use of cockney rhyming slang and wanted to get as much "cockney-ness" into the role as he could. He said that his own use of slang was sometimes "too out there" for the show but he had tried to stop it being taken out.

With the publication of the first photo of the entire Carter family together, Heat's Olivia Cooke said she loves "the excellent way that Danny's character has been styled", adding that he looks "hot". Kirsty McCormack from the Daily Express said Dyer "looks like the ultimate East End hard man". Claire Hodgson from the Daily Mirror said Dyer was "making a poor attempt at looking harder than his dog", while The List said that in the photo, Dyer looks "smug and hard-nosed". Hello thought Mick and the rest of his family look like "they're going to cause a stir". Mick wears a Pea coat and ASOS.com said he "looks like he might be the most stylish landlord of the Vic ever."

=== Family relationships ===
Upon the character's announcement, Treadwell-Collins explained that in their fictional backstory, Mick and Linda have been married for over twenty years, and have been together since they were teenagers. Hello called them "childhood sweethearts". They were called "a tight family unit", and Treadwell-Collins said they have a "good marriage" and "an easy shorthand with each other—but can also still fight like teenagers." He said that the characters would laugh, cry, argue and make up, which would embarrass their children, but would delight their neighbours. It was said that the couple "still love each other, no matter what life throws at them", and that after moving to the fictional setting of Walford from Watford, "life's about to throw them a few curve balls." Inside Soap said that Mick and Linda have a passionate relationship and adore each other. Bright explained that Mick and Linda have grown up together, and said: "It's a weird thing when you've known someone your whole life—you're more than just husband and wife. You're something else." She later said that Mick and Linda have known each other since they were five or six years old, and can finish each other's sentences and know how the other is feeling by the look on their face. Dyer and Bright both said that Mick and Linda are passionate and lustful, with Bright saying they are "madly in love" and describing a "real fizz between them". She said, "they're kind of tearing each other's heads off or tearing each other's clothes off." Dyer said there is a "Den and Angie [Watts] feel" to the relationship. Jane Simon from the Daily Mirror said that the fact Mick and Linda are happily married is a "rare thing in soapland". However, in July 2014, it was revealed in storylines that Mick and Linda are not married, yet all their families believes they are, a fact that left Carena Crawford from All About Soap wondering why they never got married and why they kept this a secret, but she hoped for a big wedding.

It was said that Mick is the youngest of three Carter siblings, and has always adored Shirley, who brought him and Tina up when they were children after their mother walked out, but Shirley and Mick were estranged for many years because Shirley and Linda did not like each other. It was later revealed that Mick has not spoken to Shirley because she caused an accident that burnt down Mick and Linda's pub 15 years previously. Dyer said that Mick is always in the middle of Linda and Shirley's arguments. He explained that Mick's reason for coming to Walford is to be close to Shirley and Tina, because "Mick has been out of his sisters' lives for far too long and this is his call to bring the family together. He's missed them terribly."

Two of Mick and Linda's children, Johnny and Nancy, were announced on 29 October 2013, with Sam Strike and Maddy Hill taking on the roles, and the first photo of the whole family of Mick, Linda, Johnny, Nancy, Shirley, Tina and the dog, was released. It was also revealed that Mick and Linda have a third child, Lee, who is a soldier in Afghanistan. Treadwell-Collins released a statement saying: "My team have worked incredibly hard over the past few months to create the Carters—a contemporary British family with cracks, knocked edges and a touch of darkness that is going to make them very special to watch. A family of strong characters who love and hate each other, all rooted in the best traditions of EastEnders. Starting with Shirley, the Carters are slowly going to creep into Albert Square as Christmas approaches and by New Year, there will be a new vibrant EastEnders clan, firmly ensconced in the Queen Vic. Watch out Walford, The Carters are coming!" Dyer said that Mick is protective of Nancy and does not think her fiancé, Wayne Ladlow (Malachi Kirby), is good enough for her.

Further details of the family's dog were revealed on 10 November. The dog is called Lady Di, named after Diana, Princess of Wales. Inside Soap reported that Lady Di is "the apple of [...] Mick's eye", would help show a softer side to his character, and adds credence to his patriotism. Mick's grandfather (originally thought to be his father), Stan Carter, played by Timothy West, and maternal great aunt (originally thought to be his aunt), Babe Smith, played by Annette Badland, were announced on 12 December 2013, and the casting of Lee was announced in January 2014, with Danny-Boy Hatchard taking on the role. It was said that Lee was "a chip off his father's block". Dyer said that Mick and Stan have "a bit of a mad relationship."

=== Other relationships and storylines ===
Mick buys the pub from Phil Mitchell, who does not know he is related to Shirley, which Inside Soap said "causes conflict". Richie said that his character, Alfie, would become friends with Mick because Mick "will want Alfie's help as the ex-landlord. Alfie does help him out and there is a friendship happening there."

In June 2014, Mick develops a friendship with Ian Beale (Adam Woodyatt) as Mick is attempting to overcome his fear of water and learn to swim. It was reported that this would "help a grieving Ian just as much as Mick." It was then reported that Mick would be arrested when he helps Ian track down Rainie Cross (Tanya Franks), a prostitute that Ian had sex with on the night his daughter Lucy Beale (Hetti Bywater) was murdered. A show source said, "Mick has no idea what he's getting into when he agrees to help Ian. We all know that Mick is one of the good guys and would never try to pick up a prostitute. He'll be praying that Linda trusts him enough to believe he's innocent." The episodes where Mick takes part in a charity swim and is arrested for kerb-crawling were originally broadcast from 4 to 8 August 2014. A promotional trailer for the episodes was released on 30 July.

=== Temporary departures ===
On 17 February 2017, it was announced that Dyer would be taking an "extended hiatus" from the show. Tabloid reports claimed Dyer had been "enforced to take a break" in order to "sort his life out" after reports that he was drunk at a National Television Awards afterparty. A BBC spokesperson confirmed Dyer is on a "short break" from the show and denied claims that he was suspended and said the break was "not enforced by bosses, nor has [Dyer] quit the show", while Digital Spy confirmed that Dyer did not attend the NTAs afterparty. Dyer departed onscreen on 23 March 2017 and Mick reappeared from 18 May 2017.

In September 2017, it was announced that Dyer's contract had been renewed for at least another two years, which secures Mick to continue appearing on the show until 2019. Dyer took another break from the soap in 2018 and Mick left the serial on 5 October 2018 while he was in prison off-screen. He returned on 17 December 2018 after he was released. Dyer took a short break from the soap on 21 September 2021 as part of Linda's temporary exit storyline. He returned on 2 November 2021.

=== Departure ===
On 8 January 2022, it was announced by an EastEnders spokesperson that Dyer was leaving. Speaking on his departure they said, "Danny will be leaving EastEnders when his contract comes to an end later this year. Danny has made Mick Carter an iconic character which we shall always be grateful for, however we won't be saying goodbye just yet as there's still quite some time – and plenty of explosive drama for Mick – to come before he departs Walford."

== Storylines ==
Mick is first mentioned when his sisters, Shirley Carter (Linda Henry) and Tina Carter (Luisa Bradshaw-White), visit his partner Linda Carter (Kellie Bright) at Linda's mother, Elaine Peacock's (Maria Friedman) pub in Watford. Linda reveals that Shirley caused Mick and Linda's pub to be destroyed by fire 15 years earlier. Tina steals money from the pub, but the next day decides to return it, telling Shirley she wants Mick back in their family. Shirley agrees and returns the money, but then informs Tina that Mick said she can keep it. Mick is the buyer of The Queen Victoria public house, and moves in with Linda, their son Johnny Carter (Sam Strike) and bulldog Lady Di (Hot Lips) the next day. Mick, Linda and Johnny attend the wedding of daughter Nancy Carter (Maddy Hill) to Wayne Ladlow (Malachi Kirby), but Mick disapproves of their relationship, so carries her away before they are married. During an argument, Nancy reveals to her parents that Johnny is gay. Mick supports Johnny, saying he is proud of him. Mick tries to get Linda to accept Johnny's sexuality.

When the Carters discover that The Queen Vic has a problem with rising damp, Tina convinces Mick and Shirley to visit their father, Stan Carter (Timothy West), who they have a less than amicable relationship with after he left the Carter children in care. After Stan suffers a fall, Linda persuades Mick to check on Stan. Mick discovers there has been a break in and disturbs the thief, who punches him and flees. Mick suspects that it was his son Lee Carter (Danny Hatchard), who may have run away from serving in the army in Afghanistan. Mick visits Stan in the hospital and enquires about Lee, and Stan assures him that he has not seen Lee. Mick leaves the hospital angry after Stan asks to stay at The Queen Vic, but Tina is angry to find out that Stan is in hospital and Mick has not told her. Tina brings Stan to The Queen Vic to stay for three weeks. Mick reluctantly agrees and is further angered when Stan makes derogatory comments about both Tina and Johnny's homosexualities and about the dangers faced by Lee in the army. Stan also tells Mick about a time when his mother tried to drown him in the bath when he was an infant.

Mick and Stan's relationship starts to thaw, annoying Shirley. Mick attempts to reunite Shirley with her estranged son, Dean Wicks (Matt Di Angelo), with little success. Tina refers to the incident involving a young Mick in the bathtub, citing the event as happening after their mother left. This confuses Mick, and he concludes that it was Stan who tried to kill him and attacks him, prompting Shirley to admit that she had attempted to drown him. Phil Mitchell (Steve McFadden) finds out from Shirley that Mick is actually her son, his father is a man named Andy and her mother Sylvie Carter (Linda Marlowe) concealed the pregnancy and brought Mick up as her and Stan's son. Shirley warns Phil not to tell Mick. Despite not being able to swim and having a phobia of water, Mick signs up to a sponsored swim in aid of his friend Billy Mitchell's (Perry Fenwick) young daughter, Janet Mitchell (Grace), who has Down syndrome. He starts to learn at the local swimming pool, and confesses his fear to his friend, Ian Beale (Adam Woodyatt). Ian helps him overcome this fear and he makes progress. Linda tells Mick she wants another baby after she realises her children are too old to require her constant attention. Mick convinces Linda that this is not a good idea, but proposes to her, as they are not actually married, though their families think they are. Linda turns down the proposal, liking things as they are, and then she finds out that Dean has overheard this conversation.

Mick successfully completes his swim for charity, but on his way home, he sees Ian talking to Rainie Cross (Tanya Franks) through the window of Ian's car. Mick pulls up behind them but Ian drives away, so Rainie, a prostitute, propositions Mick. He says he is not interested, and then the police arrive. Rainie claims Mick is a regular punter, so he is arrested for soliciting. Later, Ian explains that he had sex with Rainie on the night his daughter Lucy Beale (Hetti Bywater) was murdered (see Who Killed Lucy Beale?), so Mick agrees not to tell anyone, though he is forced to tell Linda when she receives a call from his solicitor. Cora Cross (Ann Mitchell) overhears this and supports Linda at the court. Mick pleads guilty, and Cora discovers that the prostitute is her daughter. She reveals Mick's alleged crime to everyone in The Queen Vic. Linda hates that Mick has put Ian before his own family, so Mick resolves to make Ian tell the truth to his partner Denise Fox (Diane Parish).

Mick is upset when Shirley leaves Walford after accidentally shooting Phil. Linda becomes cold towards him and refuses to have sex; Mick deduces that she is pregnant. She denies this, but he discovers Linda is pregnant and is planning to have a secret abortion. Following a discussion, they agree to keep the baby. Stan reveals he has terminal prostate cancer, leading Mick to enlist Dean's help in tracking down Shirley to try and convince her to return. They find her staying in a caravan with Buster Briggs (Karl Howman) and she soon returns. Mick and Shirley find that Shirley and Tina's mother, Sylvie, is staying with her sister Babe Smith (Annette Badland). Babe reveals that Sylvie has Alzheimer's disease.

Mick plans to propose to Linda, but Linda reveals to Mick that Dean raped her. Dean claims that he and Linda had an affair, so Mick attacks Dean. To stop the attack, Shirley reveals that Dean and Mick are brothers and she is Mick's mother, and it emerges that Buster is Mick's father as well as Dean's. Linda claims that their relationship can survive as long as nobody else finds out that she was raped. She eavesdrops while Mick, Tina, Shirley, Babe and Stan argue, only to hear Mick deny that Dean is part of the family. Mick tells Stan and Tina that Dean raped Linda. When he realises Linda has left, a despairing and devastated Mick smashes up the bar. Mick and Linda later report the rape to the police. When Mick learns that Shirley was forced to keep the secret of being his mother out of fear that she would never see him again, he decides to give her another chance, as long as Dean keeps his distance from him. He is shocked to learn that Stan wants him and Tina to help him die and stops Tina from doing so. The next week, Dean is arrested and released on bail. He refuses to leave Walford on Shirley's insistence until Mick orders him to.

Dean returns and sneaks into the pub's cellar, intending to set fire to it, and taking Nancy hostage. Mick stops him and chokes him until he is unconscious, but Dean goes missing after this. Linda proposes to Mick and he accepts. Nancy believes Mick has killed Dean, until Dean returns. Linda gives birth prematurely to Ollie Carter after falling down the stairs. Dean believes the baby is his until Mick discovers he, Linda and Ollie share the same blood group, but Dean's is different, meaning Dean cannot be Ollie's father. Mick and Buster then start to bond. Mick and Linda bring Ollie home, where Mick ejects Dean after he attempts to shake Linda's hand. Mick and Shirley reunite when they scatter Stan's ashes. Dean starts a relationship with Roxy Mitchell (Rita Simons), so her sister Ronnie Mitchell (Samantha Womack) tries to get Mick to help her get rid of Dean, but he refuses to help. Mick lies to his family so he can take Ollie to see Shirley, but they soon find out and Linda is initially not happy. Dean attempts to rape Roxy when she ends the relationship; Shirley witnesses this and realises Dean did rape Linda, and she tries to drown him but is unsuccessful. At Mick and Linda's wedding, Dean arrives and tries to drown Shirley in a lake, but Mick rescues Shirley and then resuscitates Dean after he nearly drowns, wanting him to face punishment. Dean is arrested, and Mick and Linda get married.

When they return from their honeymoon, they discover that Lee's girlfriend, Whitney Dean's (Shona McGarty), brother Ryan Malloy (Neil McDermott) has stolen £5,000 from the safe. Mick accompanies Whitney to meet Ryan and Mick convinces Ryan to return the money and hand himself to the police, because he is on the run from the police, to which Ryan agrees. Whitney tells Mick that she has feelings for him and kisses him. Mick tells Linda this, so Linda encourages Whitney not to give up on Lee.

When Nancy and Lee have an argument, Nancy pushes Lee, which results Ollie being knocked out of his high chair. Mick and Linda do not witness this, and Ollie seems fine so Linda says he does not need medical attention. However, she later finds him not breathing, and when she resuscitates him, he suffers a seizure. In hospital, the family are informed that Ollie could have brain damage; Mick blames Nancy and says he cannot forgive her, but Linda defends her and eventually forces them to work together to get Ollie the medical care he needs. Mick is devastated at Dean's acquittal but Linda reassures him. The Carters are later devastated when a pregnant Whitney suffers a miscarriage but are delighted when Lee and Whitney get married. Mick struggles look after his family when Linda goes to Spain to look after her ill mother Elaine who suffers a stroke during the Christmas break. Mick is then unhappy to learn that Lee's depression has made him contemplate suicide and that he is in debt, which Mick offers to pay. When Whitney is injured in a bus crash, Mick accompanies her to the hospital and after he assures her that she is a good wife to Lee, she kisses him, which is seen by Denise Fox (Diane Parish).

Babe breaches the pub licence when she sells alcohol in the morning, when the licence does not cover this. An undercover police officer becomes a regular customer, and eventually Mick, Babe and Shirley are arrested, charged and fined £20,000 in court. Babe leaves Sylvie near the canal, in an attempt to let her drown; when Sylvie is found, it is revealed Babe is responsible and Mick evicts her after she starts insulting Linda. The next day, Mick is disgusted to learn that Lee had hit Whitney during a row and confides in Shirley who suggest that Lee and Whitney should be separated for Whitney's safety, which he regretfully tells Lee. Lee leaves Whitney, leaving a note saying he no longer loves her, but Mick persuades him to explain to her his reasons before going. With Babe missing, Mick now is no longer required to pay her share of the fine; however, realising that Mick cannot pay the fine as well as other debts, including bills for the repair of leaks in the pub, Shirley decides to put the blame for the licence break on herself. As the fine is unpaid, Shirley is jailed and subsequently charged with perverting the cause of justice, which increases her sentence from six weeks to three months. A few days later, Ian's wife, Jane Beale (Laurie Brett) calls Linda, worried about Mick. Linda returns the following day and Mick informs her of Lee's departure and the debts he has left. Linda initially blames Whitney and an argument ensues, causing Whitney to storm out. Mick explains to Linda that it was Lee's fault, causing another argument between the two although they later make up and have sex. After a heart-to-heart with Whitney, Linda decides to return to Elaine, which angers Mick as Linda saw the state he was in and left anyway. Soon after Linda's departure, Mick receives a phone call from Tamwar saying that Nancy has been critically injured after being hit by a car while backpacking in Bulgaria. He immediately leaves Walford and flies to Bulgaria to be with her.

In Mick's absence, Linda hires a new bar manager, Woody Woodward (Lee Ryan) and agrees with Shirley to sell The Queen Vic's freehold in order to solve their financial problems. Mick returns and walks in on Whitney and Woody in bed after having sex. He then punches Woody and throws him out. He later learns that Shirley and Linda sold the freehold of The Queen Vic behind his back and forged his signature, and turns to alcohol to deal with the stress. He also learns that Max Branning (Jake Wood) set up the deal, and confronts him, branding him a snake and warning him to stay away from him. He then kisses a vulnerable Whitney who responds. Shirley learns of the kiss and tells Whitney to pack her bags and leave. When Mick learns that Shirley did this, he drunkenly throws a glass at her, but instantly regrets it and cries, saying he no longer knows himself. Mick tells Linda about the kiss on her return but is then left devastated when she tells him their relationship is over. Later, Linda agrees to give Mick another chance but when her admits he made a failed attempt to pay Whitney off with £200, Linda slaps him. Following a reconciliation and a holiday, Mick discovers Linda had cancer and did not tell him, so he leaves her. However, they get back together the following day. The freeholders of the pub, Grafton Hill, demand £60,000 for structural repairs, saying they will be evicted if they do not pay. Business consultant Fi Browning (Lisa Faulkner) tells them she has reduced it to £50,000, which they manage to raise. However, James Willmott-Brown (William Boyde) claims to own the pub, and Fi, his daughter, denies reducing the debt; the family are given a month to leave the pub. They tell James they will take the company to court, but James reveals that he knows Mick's signature was forged on the paperwork, so the Carters start looking for a new home. Mick turns down a pub in Stratford-upon-Avon after meeting Aidan Maguire (Patrick Bergin), who is arranging a robbery and he manipulates Mick into joining his team, along with Phil, Vincent Hubbard (Richard Blackwood) and Keanu Taylor (Danny Walters). Mick is shot in the arm by Callum Highway (Tony Clay) during the heist and is treated by Mariam Ahmed (Indira Joshi). Mick recovers, but the money they stole then goes missing. Halfway, who is an army friend of Lee's, moves into The Queen Vic, and the Carters are able to buy back the pub from Fi when Halfway gives them a ring he stole during the heist that is worth £200,000. This causes Aidan to suspect Mick of stealing the money, so he has a drug dealer start dealing from the Vic's toilets. When Mick tries to stop this, Aidan threatens to take The Queen Vic from them, as he has already taken The Albert bar from Vincent, and also threatens to hurt Johnny, who has moved away, and Nancy. Linda has the drug dealer arrested so Aidan threatens to have Mick killed. Mel Owen (Tamzin Outhwaite) gives Mick the number of a hitman, and when Mick discovers Aidan has covered The Queen Vic hallway as well as Ollie in petrol, the Carters agree to contact him to get rid of Aidan, but Linda stops it. The Carters then prepare to leave for Watford but Mick returns to The Queen Vic at the last minute to confront Aidan. He stands up to Aidan but Aidan beats him with his cane. He's stopped when Jack Branning (Scott Maslen), Billy, Linda, Shirley and Ted barge in and stop him. Aidan calls on his henchman and he threatens to set the pub on fire unless Mick makes an apology. He's forced to say sorry and Aidan leaves but gets punched by Phil and is warned off by Phil's knowledge that Aidan murdered Luke Browning (Adam Astill), giving back the Carters control of The Queen Vic.

Mick's childhood friend and Halfway's brother, Stuart Highway (Ricky Champ), arrives in Walford but Linda dislikes him. Mick tells Linda that Stuart went to a Young Offender Institute after covering for something Mick did when they were 13 and Linda has to accept their friendship. When Shakil Kazemi (Shaheen Jafargholi) is stabbed, Mick fails to realise he needs help so is devastated when he dies and blames himself. Mick sees pictures of and messages to schoolgirls on Stuart's phone and confronts Stuart, who says he has done nothing wrong, but Mick reports him to the police. Stuart explains that he poses as underage girls online to expose paedophiles and the police know about it. Stuart enlists Mick's help in confronting paedophiles, and Stuart reveals that he suffered sexual abuse from an officer when he was in the Young Offender Institute. Mick says Stuart should track the man down, but Stuart wants to protect girls from abuse now. Mick agrees to help but the confrontation goes wrong, but it emerges that the man is Stuart's friend and they were testing Mick. Mick is humiliated and Stuart says Mick cannot handle it and adds that he saved Mick from abuse by taking the blame for what Mick did when they were teenagers and calls Mick a coward. Mick and Stuart then have a physical fight. Stuart asks Halfway to help to confront someone but Mick urges Halfway not to go and joins them when he sees Halfway leaving. Stuart asks Halfway to confront the man, Fred Lewis, but Mick tries to stop him and the commotion causes Fred to run. Mick and Halfway follow Fred on the tube and Mick concludes that Stuart has made a mistake and Fred is not a paedophile. He tells Stuart this, but Stuart posts the confrontation video regardless. After Fred is assaulted and hospitalised, Mick gives Stuart an alibi but the police explain that Fred was trying to track down his daughter online. Stuart and Mick fight again and Stuart insists he is right about Fred. Mick tells Stuart to post a retraction video, which Stuart does but he believes that Mick needs to be hurt in the same way Stuart was in the Young Offender Institute. Stuart shoots himself and frames Mick, who is arrested and remanded. Linda starts to believe that Mick shot Stuart, ejects Tina from The Queen Vic, allows Stuart to move in and calls a solicitor to initiate divorce proceedings. However, this is actually part of Linda's secret plan to help get Mick out of prison. Linda records Stuart admitting that Mick did not shoot him and he is released from prison. Mick takes Stuart to an abandoned factory where he vows to kill him. Mick is diagnosed as suffering from panic attacks and both Mick and Linda struggle with Ollie's autism diagnosis.

Linda develops an alcohol problem, and despite Mick's several attempts to get her to stop drinking, she does not stop. He suggests that her behaviour is affecting Ollie, to which Linda responds by filing for a divorce, and she expresses an interest in getting full custody of Ollie. Mick agrees to the divorce, but the pair go back on their decision when they have a near-death experience in a boat accident. They agree to sell the Queen Vic in order to combat Linda's alcoholism, and find new jobs elsewhere. Mick begins to worry when he finds photos of the Carter family on Frankie Lewis' (Rose Ayling-Ellis) camera, and quizzes her about it. Frankie reveals that she believes she is Mick's daughter, and states that Katy Lewis (Simone Lahbib) is her mother. Katy is later revealed to be Mick's former social worker, who was 20 when involved with Mick, then aged 12, in 1989. Mick states that he pursued the relationship with Katy, but Frankie refuses to listen, stating that he is a victim of abuse. He is unable to confide in Linda, who genuinely thinks he no longer loves her and starts an affair with Max Branning (Jake Wood). Katy convinces Mick that what he remembers did not happen but he starts suffering flashbacks. He feels suicidal and calls The Samaritans while contemplating jumping from the rooftop of The Queen Vic. He then confides in Linda, who helps him come to understand that Katy did sexually abuse him. She apologises for her affair with Max and the couple reconcile. Katy is later arrested and stands trial for abusing Mick and is sentenced to ten years imprisonment. Hoping to win Linda back, Max blackmails Sharon into selling the Queen Vic back to the Carters. Linda stands by Mick and Max leaves for New Zealand; soon after his departure, Linda reveals to Mick that she is pregnant but Max is the father. Wanting to keep Max away from Walford, Mick agrees to raise the baby as his own. Nancy returns to Walford following the breakdown of her marriage and Mick helps her bond with Frankie. He disapproves when Nancy begins a relationship with Zack Hudson (James Farrar). Several of Mick and Linda's neighbours become suspicious of her pregnancy timings, including Max's ex-wife Rainie. She tries to expose the paternity of Linda's baby, hoping to lure Max back to Walford so she can be reunited with his granddaughter Abi. Linda gives birth to a daughter, Annie, and leaves Walford with Mick soon after in fear that Rainie will bring Max back to Walford.

Mick returns to Walford weeks later, leaving Linda and Annie with Elaine in Watford. New bar manager Janine Butcher (Charlie Brooks) falls for Mick and comes to live at the Vic when she's made homeless. Mick encourages her to bond with her estranged daughter Scarlett (Tabitha Byron). Janine kisses Mick but he initially rejects her and tells her to move out because his heart is with Linda. He invites Linda to attend a New Year's Eve party at the Vic, but Janine manipulates events so Linda believes Mick does not want her to return. Mick later learns Linda has fallen off the wagon once again and she leaves him a voicemail demanding a divorce.

After a few months, Janine moves in with Mick and they begin dating, eventually leading to them becoming engaged and Janine becoming pregnant with Mick's child. Janine's brother Ricky (Sid Owen) returns to Walford to support his sister. After bonding with Ricky, Mick persuades his ex-wife Sam Mitchell (Kim Medcalf) to go on a date with him, and she later agrees to accompany him to Mick and Janine's wedding. Mick then marries Janine, but soon ends the marriage after learning about Janine manipulating him. He also finds out about Janine setting up Linda by putting her in the driving seat of a car Janine was driving after it crashed, and Janine's role in Annie being briefly taken away by social services.

Mick then rekindles his relationship with Linda and confesses he has loved her all along. They both agree to try again after Mick forces Janine out. Janine escapes and gets in a car to Dover to catch a ferry to escape the police. Janine is followed by Mick and Linda, who want to bring her to justice. As Janine drives to Dover, she confronts and hurts Mick before driving off, whilst Linda quickly follows and ends up in the car too, attempting to stop Janine. The car is steered off the road towards the cliff. After the car falls off the cliff and into the sea, Mick later jumps in to save Janine and their unborn baby at Linda's plea. Mick runs back to save Linda, but is unaware that she escaped the car and managed to make it onshore. Mick dives back into the sea, heading for the car, but does not resurface, and is presumed dead. Janine is subsequently arrested on Boxing Day, and is later sentenced to five years imprisonment for perverting the course of justice. In June 2023, it is revealed that Janine has given birth to Mick's son in prison.

In November 2026, Linda receives news that Mick’s remains have been found. However, Janine later revealed to Max Branning that the body she identified wasn't Mick's.

== Other appearances ==
Mick appears in animated form, voiced by Dyer, in a Children in Need sketch called Tom and Jerry: A Fundraising Adventure, broadcast during the 2014 telethon on 14 November 2014, along with Linda in The Queen Victoria. In the sketch, cartoon cat and mouse duo Tom and Jerry visit several animated versions of BBC stars, tasked by Terry Wogan to raise cash.

== Reception ==
=== Announcement ===
When Dyer's casting in the series was announced, Daniel Kilkelly from entertainment website Digital Spy expected reactions to be mixed, as comments made by the website's readers about Dyer in the past have included both praise and derision, and felt the announcement would spark debate. Kilkelly felt positive about the casting, saying: "Dyer has a strong screen presence which is going to be crucial when it comes to taking over such an important role in EastEnders. Recent new characters to join the show have seemed to stay on the sidelines with no clear direction, while the plan for Mick is for him to join the Square and take on his new job straight away. Dyer should definitely be up to the task of hitting the ground running." He was relieved that Dyer would not be playing another hardman character, saying that "it should be interesting to see how he rises to the challenge." However, he opined that casting a well-known actor who divides opinions could be a risk, as fans of the show may see Dyer, rather than his character, moving into the show, and hoped that the actor's profile would not lead to him leaving the series after only a short stint. Alex Fletcher from the site said, "Danny Dyer. In EastEnders. The two things together still don't quite seem believable, but it really is happening", and predicted he would be "awesome".

Vicky Prior from the Metro said she was "thrilled" that Shirley's family was being extended, but wondered why Mick had not been mentioned before. She said the role of a "bloke's bloke with a soft heart" was unusual for Dyer, who normally plays gangster roles, and sounds similar to previous Queen Victoria landlord Alfie Moon, played by Shane Richie. Prior wondered if Dyer would fit into the show, as Mick's partner Linda sounds "a little dull", and Dyer is known for bad films. However, she concluded that Dyer's casting was "a coup" for EastEnders, and he could become "the saviour of the soap", though opined that "It's likely that EastEnders will prove to be the saviour of Danny Dyer's career." Simon Swift from the Metro thought Dyer was an "interesting" signing, saying he should be "a welcome addition" because of the number of "strong female characters", but added "so long as they veer more towards Dirty Den's landlord rather than, say, Alfie Moon's."

Ellen E Jones from The Independent thought Dyer in EastEnders seemed "inevitable" and called him "the cockney messiah [who has] come to save EastEnders". She said that Dyer walks the "thin line between national treasure and national laughing stock", so EastEnders—"which works best when it's an overblown cockney pantomime"—would be Dyer's "natural home". Kevin O'Sullivan from the Daily Mirror said that it would take more than hiring Dyer to "stop the rot", as fans were getting "fed up" of watching the show. Katy Brent from the Daily Mirror said: "I'm kind of intrigued to see what Danny Dyer is going to bring to the table, or bar in his case, but I think it's going to take me a little while to be convinced by him. No offence Dan, I'm sure you'll be great, but I'm a little sceptical when 'names' are brought in."

Olivia Cooke from Heat said "Danny Dyer being a cast member of EastEnders seems like such an obvious thing we can hardly believe it's taken until now for it to happen." Inside Soap noted that Christmas in EastEnders is "always an explosive time", so the Carters' arrival was "perfectly timed", and said it would be "a welcome gift for Shirley and Tina", going on to say, "We can't wait for this new era in the Vic to kick off!" All About Soap said they were "very excited" that Shirley's family were being introduced and taking over The Queen Victoria. Inside Soap's Kate White said she "can't wait to see the impant the Carters have on their new manor, as well as seeing Danny in action behind that bar." Rosie Gizauskas from Now said Dyer's casting was "the best idea ever", adding, "this will totally work. I literally can't wait to see original East End geezer Danny in [...] his spiritual home. [...] This was meant to be." Yahoo! TV UK said that Dyer joining EastEnders would be "interesting" because he "tends to divide viewers into those who think he's a ridiculous posturing fool and those who think he's a ridiculous posturing fool who can also act." Ben Dowell from the Radio Times thought the description of Mick sounded like comedian Al Murray's Pub Landlord character. Former EastEnders cast member Scott Maslen, who played Jack Branning, said of Dyer's casting in the show: "He will go there, give a bit of banter and he will embrace it, but it'll be a challenge for him. I think he is a good fit for the character and he would do really well in it."

On the day of the character's announcement, bookmaker Coral offered odds of 16–1 that Mick would be killed off within a year, and 3–1 that he would still be in the show by the end of 2014. The bookmaker also expected EastEnders to win the Christmas 2013 ratings battle against rival soaps Coronation Street and Emmerdale, with spokeswoman Nicola McGeady saying, "The battle of the soaps is heating up, and with new faces joining EastEnders, the odds suggest that the East End drama will win the ratings war this Christmas." William Hill also started taking bets on who would be the first character that Mick would eject from the pub, with Carl White (Daniel Coonan) the favourite with odds of 5–1, David Wicks (Michael French) and Max Branning (Jake Wood) on 6–1, Phil Mitchell (Steve McFadden) on 12–1, and Masood Ahmed (Nitin Ganatra) the outsider at 40–1.

As the public heard of Dyer's casting, his name began trending on Twitter. Mark James Lowe from All About Soap said that the casting had created an "amazing buzz" about EastEnders, and that the introduction of the Carters was one of many "great changes" to the show being made by Treadwell-Collins, saying that EastEnders was "finally becoming a show to look forward to watching again." The Daily Star published tweets from fans who said Dyer would "single-handedly turn EastEnders around" and hoped he could appear in the show sooner. Website EntertainmentWise ran a poll to ask readers for their opinions on Dyer's casting: 63.49% of people who answered said they were excited. A similar Digital Spy poll showed that 70.5% of respondents were looking forward to Dyer appearing in the show, while the other 29.5% did not think he would fit in. A Heat poll showed that 59% of those who took part thought Dyer could "save the show's flagging fortunes". The casting received further praise from fans on Twitter when the first family photo was released. It was reported on 17 December 2013 that Dyer's casting in EastEnders had helped the show become "the most searched for television show of 2013" on Google.

Dyer's casting was criticised by domestic violence charities because, in 2010, he was quoted in Zoo, for which he was an agony uncle, as advising someone to "cut your ex's face, and then no-one will want her." One volunteer said, "This man's arrival will horrify many female fans", while family campaigner Dr Adrian Rogers said, "This sends out completely the wrong message to viewers. Domestic violence is a major problem and the cause of pain and misery for many families. This man has spouted questionable opinions and gets rewarded." Dyer apologised at the time and took responsibility for saying "something stupid", and an EastEnders spokesperson responded to the criticism by saying, "Danny has stated many times that the comments previously published are not his views."

=== Arrival and storylines ===
Victoria Garo-Falides from the Daily Mirror described Dyer's scenes as Mick in his first episode as "180 seconds of smarm-filled, smooth talking", and expected him to have more screen time considering the anticipation of his arrival, adding that he failed to "leave much of an impression in his squint-and-you'll-miss-him appearance". Caroline Westbrook from the Metro said that although Mick's appearance in his first episode was "fleeting", he had "proven a popular addition to the EastEnders cast." Viewers reactions to Mick's first episode were mixed, with Dyer's name trending on Twitter for more than 12 hours. Ian Hyland from the Daily Mirror said that hiring Dyer was an "almighty gamble" but he was a "revelation".

The scenes in which Johnny comes out as gay to Mick in the 3 January 2014 episode were widely praised by viewers on Twitter. Jane Simon of the Daily Mirror said Dyer's performance was "absolutely superb" and anticipated that he would receive awards for it. David Brown from Radio Times called the scenes "tender and poignant" and praised the character, saying, "News that he wants to do a stretch as long as Adam Woodyatt's is very welcome." Hyland said that June 2014 scenes featuring Mick and Ian at the swimming pool were "nicely done". In 2021, Laura-Jayne Tyler from Inside Soap wrote that it was "sad" that Mick had never met former character Frank Butcher (Mike Reid), predicting that they would have had a "right old bubble together.

=== Awards and nominations ===
Since Mick's arrival in EastEnders, Dyer has received a number of award nominations for the role, and has so far won three. At the 2014 British Soap Awards, Dyer was longlisted in the public-voted categories for "Sexiest Male" and "Best Actor". He was shortlisted for both awards, and also received panel-voted nominations in the categories for "Spectacular Scene of the Year", for the scene in which Johnny comes out to Mick, and "Best On-screen Partnership", for Mick's relationship with Linda. All four awards were won by other soaps operas. Also in 2014, he was nominated and shortlisted for the best soap actor award at the TV Choice Awards, which he went on to win in September. He was nominated in the best actor and sexiest male categories at the 2014 Inside Soap Awards, which are also voted for by the public. Dyer said he could not understand being nominated for sexiest male, as he is "too fat and old", and opined, "Maybe it's the character people find sexy, because the kids I'm up against are like flipping athletes."

In 2015, Dyer won the award for best serial drama performance at the National Television Awards, beating his on-screen wife, Kellie Bright. He was then the winner of the Television and Radio Industries Club award for soap personality, and was shortlisted for the best actor award at the 2015 British Soap Awards, losing to his co-star, Adam Woodyatt (Ian Beale). In May 2015, Dyer was once again nominated and shortlisted for the "Best Soap Actor" award at the TV Choice Awards. In July 2015, Dyer made the Inside Soap Awards longlist, again, in the "Best Actor" and "Sexiest Male" categories. In August 2017, Dyer was longlisted for Best Actor and Funniest Male at the Inside Soap Awards, while he and Bright were longlisted for Best Partnership and the showdown between Mick and Linda were longlisted for Best Show-Stopper. Dyer made the shortlist for the Best Actor accolade, but lost out to Danny Miller, who portrays Aaron Dingle in Emmerdale.

Dyer was nominated for Best Soap Actor (Male) at the 2018 Digital Spy Reader Awards; he came in seventh place with 6.4% of the total votes. Mick's pairing with Linda came second in the "Best Soap Couple" category with 10.6% of the total votes, while Stuart's shooting came ninth in the "Best Soap Storyline" category with 4.3% of the total votes, and the "heist saga" where Mick is shot came sixth in the "Most Bizarre Soap Storyline" category with 8% of the total votes. In 2019, Dyer received his fifth National Television Awards nomination in the Serial Drama Performance category for his portrayal of Mick. In a 2021 Radio Times poll, Mick and Linda were voted as the joint sixth "soap pub landlord", receiving 6% of the votes.
