= Ronnie Mitchell =

Fictional character from EastEnders

- EastEnders character
- Samantha Womack as Ronnie (2013)
- Portrayed by: Samantha Womack (2007–2017); Lucia De Wan (2022 flashback)
- Duration: 2007–2011, 2013–2017, 2022
- First appearance: Episode 3405; 24 July 2007
- Last appearance: Episode 6550; 5 September 2022
- Created by: Dominic Treadwell-Collins
- Introduced by: Diederick Santer (2007); Lorraine Newman (2013); Chris Clenshaw (2022)
- Spin-off appearances: EastEnders: E20 (2010)
In-universe information
- Other names: Veronica Elizabeth Mitchell; Ronnie Branning
- Occupation: Barmaid; Bar manager; Nightclub owner; Businesswoman; Career criminal
- Family: Mitchell/Branning
- Father: Archie Mitchell
- Mother: Glenda Mitchell
- Stepmother: Peggy Mitchell
- Sisters: Roxy Mitchell
- Half-brothers: Danny Mitchell
- Husband: Jack Branning (2010–2012, 2017); Charlie Cotton (2015–2016)
- Sons: James Branning; Matthew Mitchell Cotton
- Daughters: Danielle Jones
- Stepsons: Ricky Branning
- Stepdaughters: Penny Branning; Amy Mitchell
- Grandfathers: Phillip Mitchell
- Grandmothers: Sandra Mitchell
- Uncles: Eric Mitchell; Clive Mitchell
- Nieces: Amy Mitchell
- First cousins: Phil Mitchell; Grant Mitchell; Sam Mitchell
- Other relatives: Billy Mitchell; Ben Mitchell; Louise Mitchell; Ricky Branning; Janet Mitchell; Will Mitchell; Lola Pearce; Lexi Pearce

Ronnie Mitchell (also Branning) is a fictional character from the BBC soap opera EastEnders, played by Samantha Womack. She and her younger sister Roxy Mitchell (Rita Simons) were introduced by executive producer Diederick Santer in July 2007. Ronnie is described as the "ice" to Roxy's "fire". As an extension to the already established Mitchell family, Ronnie quickly became a prominent character, taking over the square’s local nightclub. She later formed an on-off relationship with her business partner, Jack Branning (Scott Maslen).

The character is introduced during the episode first broadcast on 24 July 2007. Her first major storyline saw Ronnie clash with her villainous father, Archie Mitchell (Larry Lamb), after it transpired that he forced his eldest daughter — at the age of 14 — to give up her newborn baby just moments after she gave birth. This escalates in "The Secret Mitchell" and "Who Killed Archie?" scenarios, wherein the former explores Ronnie's friendship with her employee Danielle Jones (Lauren Crace) — who later turns out to be her long-lost daughter — and the latter reveals that Archie had raped Ronnie when she was 13. Soon afterwards, Ronnie becomes the subject of a controversial storyline where she swaps her dead baby with that of Tommy Moon (Shane and Ralfie White) — the son of her close friend Kat Moon (Jessie Wallace). This contributes to the development of Womack leaving the role in 2011, with the character departing in the episode shown on 7 July 2011. In May 2013, show bosses announced that Womack would return to EastEnders as Ronnie for six months. Womack returned on screen for two three-month-long stints, from 9 September 2013 to 1 January 2014 and from 3 March to 23 June 2014. She then returned full-time to screens on 25 September 2014. Womack's second stint on the show saw Ronnie involved in storylines such as killing Carl White (Daniel Coonan) in self-defence, marrying Charlie Cotton (Declan Bennett) and having a child with him, having an affair with Vincent Hubbard (Richard Blackwood), attempting to poison Dean Wicks (Matt Di Angelo), being stalked by Andy Flynn (Jack Derges), and remarrying Jack before drowning along with Roxy in a hotel swimming pool.

In August 2016, it was reported that Ronnie and Roxy would depart together in a "dramatic exit". The sisters were killed-off on 1 January 2017 after Ronnie's second wedding to Jack, although Ronnie appears on-screen for a final time when Jack visits her corpse on 19 January 2017. A younger version of Ronnie, (played by Lucia De Wan), appeared in a flashback episode broadcast on 5 September 2022, which focuses on the Mitchell family in the 1970s.

== Development ==
=== Creation and characterisation ===
Womack (called Janus until May 2009) and Simons were cast as Ronnie and Roxy respectively. They were the first major signings made by executive producer Diederick Santer, who told the Daily Mirror that the sisters were intended to bring "sexy, dramatic excitement" to the show. He stated, "They may be glamorous young women, but these girls are Mitchells and have all the strength of character and unique moral code the name implies." Simons deemed the two "the next generation" of the Mitchells, "A newer, younger, slightly more modern type". The characters were created by EastEnders' story producer Dominic Treadwell-Collins, who always intended for Ronnie to be played by Womack. In the 2009 documentary "The Secret Mitchell", he cited the actress' beauty, toughness and fragility as facets suitable for the character.

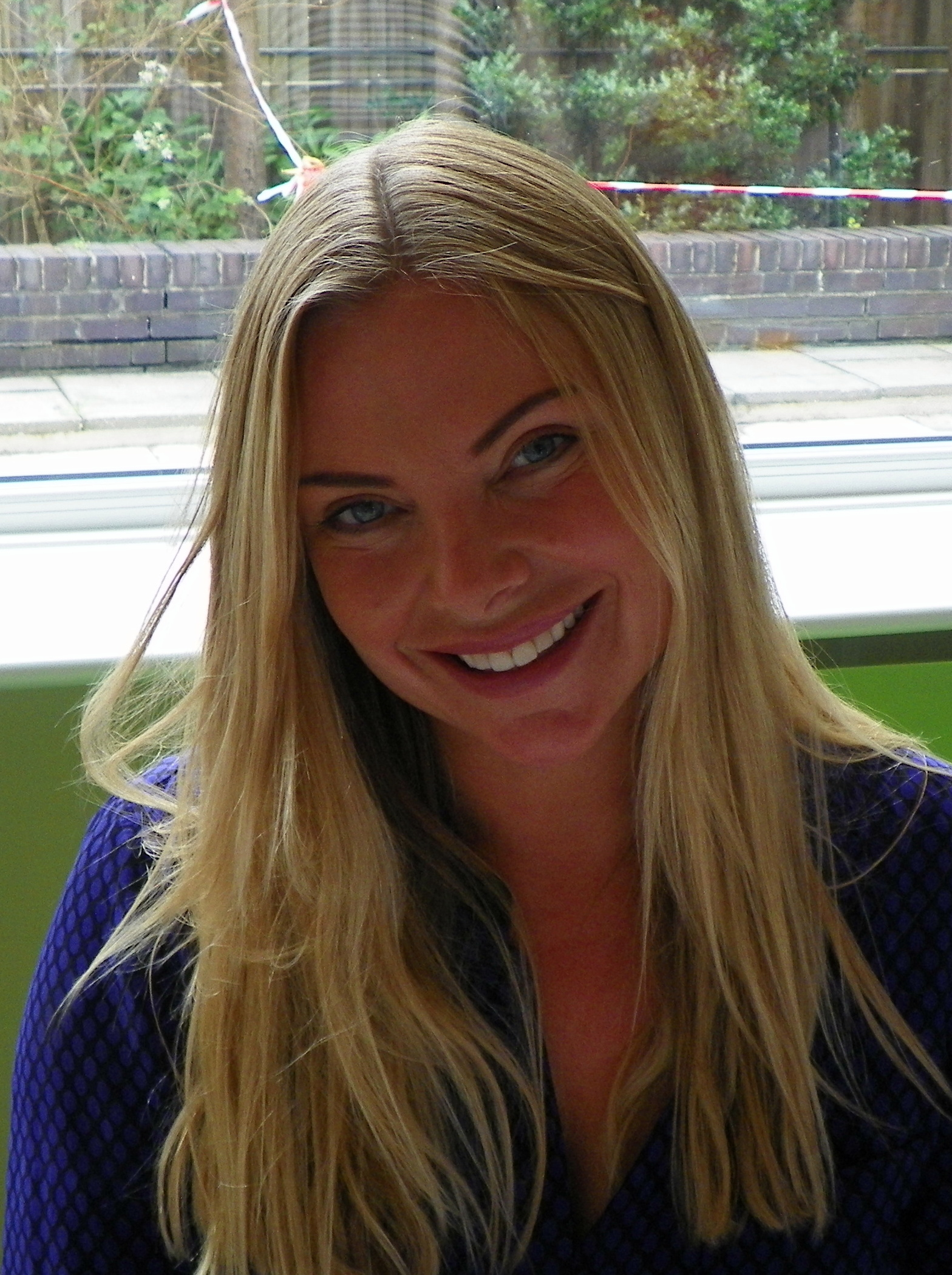
Samantha Womack played Ronnie from 2007 to 2011 and 2013 to 2017.

Ronnie is in her thirties, and the elder of the two sisters. Prior to her début, Womack described Ronnie as the more sensible and intelligent sister, stating that she has a "caustic tongue" and trust issues. She commented that the sisters are loyal to each other to the point that Ronnie would kill for Roxy, and attributed her "darker side" to her troubled childhood. A BBC source described Ronnie as the ice to Roxy's fire, and Simons deemed her "armoured", as well as the "less flamboyant, darker" sister, with a more controlling nature. Womack feels that Ronnie is "deeply damaged", describing her as unable to be honest with herself or others as a result of her guarded personality. She explained that she has been taught to hide her feelings and to be a survivor, which she accomplishes by controlling others, concluding that Ronnie is defined by her childhood trauma. The sisters have been compared to the Kray twins, Ronnie and Reggie. Treadwell-Collins initially intended for Ronnie to appear enigmatic, cool and guarded, hoping to intrigue viewers before introducing elements of her backstory to garner audience sympathy.

==== Promotion ====
Both Mitchell sisters featured heavily in a BBC marketing campaign preceding their arrival. Several promotional trailers aired on the BBC network in summer 2007. Using the slogan "The square, under new management", one such trailer depicted both sisters as party girls, dancing, serving tequila in The Queen Victoria public house, shocking the older residents with their raunchy antics and squirting men with a soda siphon to the tune of "The Girls" by Calvin Harris. This scene was recreated for the sisters' final episode in 2017. Two other trailers featured Ronnie and Roxy individually. To the instrumental sound of "Little Green Bag" by George Baker, each sister discussed their sibling, giving snippets of information on their personality and the dynamics of their relationship. Discussing Ronnie, Roxy stated that her sister would go to great lengths to prevent her from getting hurt. In turn, Ronnie said "Roxy will always be my kid sister. Fights, broken hearts, over the years we've had them all. She can be quite a handful, and she's definitely gonna stir things up around here. But remember, wherever Roxy Mitchell is... I'm right behind." The promotion was received favourably by Leigh Holmwood, television journalist for The Guardian, who referred to it as "a very slick marketing campaign indeed." Holmwood observed that the upbeat trailers contrasted EastEnders' reputation for depressing storylines, writing "Maybe the arrival of Roxy and Ronnie will herald a new golden age for the soap? Or maybe the BBC marketing department is just very good at putting a trailer together..."

In addition to the trailers, the BBC planned a "glitzy" EastEnders BBC Radio 1 competition to promote the sisters' arrival, called "I love R&R" (Ronnie and Roxy). It ran from the end of June 2007, and included online promotion and video via the website Iloverandr.com. The prize consisted of VIP tickets to a special party, which was to be attended by EastEnders actors and Radio 1 DJ Dave Pearce. Despite inviting the winners to attend, Radio 1 cancelled the event due to orders from BBC director general Mark Thompson, who called a halt to all BBC radio, TV and online competitions following a review of its programming, which uncovered scores of editorial breaches. Radio 1 reportedly decided to cancel the promotion as a "precautionary measure". Winners were instead told that they would receive a tour of the EastEnders set, and the website was closed down on 26 July 2007.

=== Family relationships ===
Upon her introduction, Ronnie's loss of a child was initially kept a secret. She was depicted reacting with jealousy to Roxy's pregnancy. The secret was linked to a photograph carried in Ronnie's locket, which was revealed in May 2008 to be of the daughter she had lost.

The animosity between Ronnie and her father was explored in July 2008, when Lamb made his first appearance as Archie. Womack believes that the introduction of Archie was "fundamental to Ronnie and how she was perceived by the audience. This was the underbelly of why everything had gone wrong in her life, and so these scenes were always going to be really, really important." Archie made a death threat against Ronnie, and told her that Amy had died 13 years previously. He believes Archie's relationship with Ronnie suffered when he realised that he could not control her. In the EastEnders Revealed documentary "The Secret Mitchell", an EastEnders storyliner suggested that Archie views Ronnie as damaged goods, and is somewhat disgusted by her. Santer stated that Archie told Ronnie her daughter had died as a way of controlling her.

In a plot twist, it was revealed to viewers that Archie had lied, and that Amy was alive. She was introduced to the series under her adopted name, Danielle Jones, in August 2008. Danielle arrived in Walford seeking Ronnie, but kept her true identity a secret through fear of rejection. Series writer Simon Ashdown described her as "hurt and broken by her life", and hoping to charm Ronnie into liking her before revealing the truth. Crace observed that Danielle was intrigued by Ronnie and the Mitchells, but also worried that she was too different from them and might be a disappointment to Ronnie. Danielle became pregnant, which was used as a plot-device to bring the two closer together, with Ronnie supporting her when she chose to have an abortion. The writers deliberately played on the tragedy of Ronnie being unaware that she was encouraging the abortion of her own grandchild. Ronnie failed to attend Danielle's second clinic appointment, which Crace stated left her character "hurt and distraught" and less willing to confide the truth in Ronnie than ever. On Ronnie's part, Womack assessed that her character was unaware why she had bonded with Danielle. She deemed her totally unaware of any physical resemblance between herself and Danielle, and stated that she had never entertained the notion that Danielle might be her daughter.

In the aftermath of her abortion, Danielle was depicted as being increasingly emotionally unstable and angry with Ronnie, believing that she deserved to belong to the Mitchell family. The writers had Archie discover her secret as a test of his character, experimenting with whether he would be despicable enough to conceal the truth. Lamb deemed Danielle "a huge threat" to Archie's position as patriarch of the Mitchell family. As such, Archie lied that Ronnie was suffering from depression and convinced Danielle not to reveal the truth for the sake of her mother's mental well-being. Danielle accepted the lie, believing it to explain Ronnie's "hot and cold" reaction to her, and attempted to care for Ronnie and help her recover. Crace explained that despite their turbulent relationship, Ronnie was all Danielle had ever wanted.

The ultimate revelation of Danielle's identity was set at Archie's wedding to Peggy. Santer explained: "Weddings are great because they bring the community together. A wedding gives you a stage, it gives you an event, the context to play things out, so it felt right that these big Mitchell stories would collide at Peggy's wedding." Writer James Payne concurred that setting the reveal at the wedding helped to make the moment "as dramatic and sensational" as it could possibly be. In the episode, Danielle announces that she is Ronnie's daughter in front of the entire wedding reception party. She is met with disbelief, and thrown out by Ronnie. Soon thereafter, however, Ronnie discovers that Danielle has an identical locket to her own. Having given the matching locket to her daughter, Ronnie realises that Danielle was telling the truth. She hurries to find her, but just as they are about to be reunited, Danielle is run down by local resident Janine Butcher (Charlie Brooks), and subsequently dies in Ronnie's arms. Although different outcomes to the storyline were considered, Santer explained that Danielle dying best preserved Ronnie's status as EastEnders' "tragic heroine character". Treadwell-Collins felt that to allow Ronnie to have her daughter, the "one thing that is key to her character" would serve to progressively weaken her character, and Santer agreed that while it may initially be touching, ultimately the relationship would become boring. In December 2009, Archie was murdered in a "whodunit" storyline. Santer hoped that his death would bring Ronnie closure, but suggested conversely that it might damage her further.

=== Relationship with Jack Branning ===
Jack Branning was introduced in October 2007, and his association with Ronnie was developed after he became her business partner at the soap's club, "R&R". A flirtatious romance was established, which led to the start of a relationship in early 2008. The on-screen affair between Ronnie and Jack has reportedly been hard for actors Samantha Womack and Scott Maslen, as off-screen they are close friends – Womack's husband is best friends with Maslen, and Womack is best friends with Maslen's wife. Womack has commented, "I was very honest and verbal about [being freaked out] [...] Our first kissing scene felt really uncomfortable, it was terrible, but we're over it now [...] Both our sons are slightly freaked out that one mummy seems to be kissing the other daddy, but they've been on so many film sets that they're used to us doing ludicrous things."

In the storyline, Ronnie's association with Jack caused aggravation with her family, due to Jack's rivalry with her cousin Phil, and resentment from her sister, Roxy. However, the relationship ended less than a month after it began. Roxy told Ronnie that Jack cheated on her with his ex-wife, Selina, she decided not to move in with him, and punched him. In an interview in the TV Times, Womack commented, "She [Ronnie] has a problem with physical violence. Any time she's up against it or feels she's been lied to, she lashes out".

Despite this, the characters' on/off romance was resurrected later in the year, facilitating a plot twist whereby Jack, angered after another break-up with Ronnie, was seduced by Roxy as revenge for Ronnie interfering in her love life. This resulted in a "who's the daddy?" storyline, which began in April 2008 and continued throughout the year, with both Jack and Sean Slater (Robert Kazinsky) potential candidates for the father of Roxy's unborn child, though Ronnie remained unaware of Jack and Roxy's liaison. In the storyline, Roxy and Jack agreed to keep their affair secret, while Roxy appropriated Sean Slater as the father, and married him.

=== Baby swap storyline and departure (2011) ===
"The storyline presented Ronnie with grief, disbelief and anger and the temporary breakdown of her relationship as well as her gradual coming to terms with her loss and the efforts to re-build her life following the tragedy. This underlined the fact to viewers that whilst the loss of baby James was a catalyst, Ronnie's reaction was born out of extreme personal trauma in her life and not as the direct and sole consequence of losing her baby. It is Ofcom's view that the broadcaster did not intend the storyline to suggest that her actions were a typical response of a mother who had experienced SIDS and therefore sufficient editorial context was provided to viewers."

— Ofcom's broadcast bulletin clearing the storyline

At the end of 2010, Kat Moon (Jessie Wallace) and Ronnie both give birth on the same day, but Ronnie's baby, James, dies and while Kat is in hospital and her baby, Tommy, is unattended, Ronnie swaps the infants. The storyline received over 6,000 complaints, making it the second most complained about EastEnders storyline. It was then decided to end the storyline earlier than originally planned. It was reported by the Daily Star Sunday that Ronnie experiences a change of heart after visiting relatives in hospital and seeing the midwife who delivered her son. An EastEnders spokesperson said, "We do not comment on future storylines but we have always said Ronnie will do the right thing and Tommy will be reunited with Kat." Wallace revealed that she doesn't regret her involvement of the baby-swap storyline, saying that she was "just doing her job". Wallace told Bang Showbiz:"I stand by it. We're actors at the end of the day, we do our job and then we go home. It's drama, that's it." She also praised Womack's acting and vowed to move on to "bigger and better things" after she departed. She added: "[Samantha is] a fantastic actress who played a brilliant role in a fantastic storyline so I wish her all the best."

Co-star Nina Wadia praised Womack and Wallace for their "acting skills" during the storyline. Marc Elliott added: "The storyline got whipped up into a massive frenzy. It's not representative in any way, shape or form of mothers who have lost their babies." EastEnders actress Patsy Palmer has also praised the plot for its "great acting". In an interview with Take It Easy, asked whether the show's bosses handled the storyline well, Palmer replied: "I think they did. I know there's been loads of bad press, but something like that is always going to be sad to watch and it will upset people. But at the end of the day, it's a drama and it's not real. I think it got blown out of all proportion. Unfortunately, things like that do happen in real life. Babies get swapped and snatched in hospitals. I'm sure that any parent who has lost a child will find even talking about their experience very difficult, let alone watching it being acted out on television. Even my daughter got upset but she is only 9 so maybe I shouldn't have let her watch it. I just didn't realise it was going to be so heart-wrenching, which was down to the great acting."

Womack admitted that she thought the plot was "implausible". She commented: "I thought it was implausible. Most women who lose a child would not go out and abduct one," she told the Daily Mirror. "But Ronnie is a soap character and she is not necessarily representing real life. Soap is based on controversy and sensationalism because bosses are trying to get high ratings and they can't write things like 'Ronnie had a cup of tea'. Otherwise people wouldn't watch it." On 1 August 2011, Ofcom cleared the storyline. The baby swap storyline prompted a huge 1,044 complaints reported to Ofcom. Ofcom also added that many of the complaints were made because the storyline was presented "in an offensive manner" because it "appeared to suggest that a mother who has suddenly and tragically lost a baby through cot death would react by stealing another baby to replace that loss". Kym Marsh supported Ofcom's decision to clear the storyline. Marsh wrote in her magazine section: "Last week, EastEnders was cleared of wrongdoing by Ofcom, the media regulator, over its baby swap storyline, and I think that's the right decision. It's just a storyline, like any other. I understand why people got upset about it, but no-one meant to upset anybody. Soaps are supposed to portray real life to a certain extent, but it's meant to be high drama for entertainment purposes. I mean, how many murders can you have in one square? There's a nod to real life but, for the most part, soaps help take people out of the real world."

On 6 January 2011, it was reported that Womack had quit her role in the series due to her unhappiness with the baby swap storyline. Her departure was later confirmed by the BBC and she was to leave the role in May 2011. However, Womack denied that her decision had anything to do with the storyline. Her contract ends in May 2011 and she will take a break from the series that had already been agreed. Womack's agent said in a statement: "There's no truth whatsoever in any suggestion that Sam is 'quitting' Eastenders [sic] over the current storyline. Her contract comes to a natural end later this year and she will be taking a break from the show; this has been agreed with the producers for several months. Sam has had an incredibly happy and fulfilling time on EastEnders over the last few years. She has huge respect for the show, writers and producers and has thoroughly enjoyed playing such a complex role that has been involved in so many tough and challenging storylines."

It was reported by the Daily Star Sunday that when Max Branning (Jake Wood) and his daughter Abi (Lorna Fitzgerald) are injured in an accident, Ronnie visits Max in the hospital where she gave birth to James, sees the midwife who delivered the child and it triggers the start of the baby swap reveal storyline.

It was reported that her last storyline would evolve around Michael Moon becoming obsessed with her and stalking her, which will build up to her on-screen exit later in the year. However this was not the case and Ronnie departed on 7 July 2011 after being sent to prison for kidnapping Tommy.

In April 2013, Womack said of her departure, "I think it was definitely the right time to give the character a break. The danger is that if you get one character who is subject to so much trauma, angst and depression, it becomes difficult to play it realistically."

In September 2012, Inside Soap named Ronnie's exit as their number 8 happy ending, "Bit of an odd [exit] this. Yes, Ronnie's first child died in her arms on the day they were reunited. And yes, her baby James tragically died very soon after birth. And yes, she was eventually sent to jail for nicking off with Kat's [child], Tommy. But on the day that prison door slammed shut, Ronnie sat down, sighed and finally smiled. She'd found her peace at last."

=== Reintroduction (2013) ===
In April 2013, Womack said that she would not rule out a return to EastEnders, and even though Maslen was due to leave, she said that Ronnie would still have reasons to return with Roxy still in the cast. She said, "I think she could go back if Jack wasn't there, because it was always the Mitchell sisters. I know Ronnie had a love affair and she got married, but what I loved about the character was her relationship with her sibling. It was nice being with another woman and doing most of our scenes together. That was a relationship on the show I really enjoyed. There are no plans [for Ronnie to return] at the moment but I definitely wouldn't rule it out. I love the show and I love the character. I miss the character enormously." On 17 May 2013, show bosses announced that Womack would return to EastEnders as Ronnie for six months. It was said that Ronnie's return will form a major part of summer and autumn storylines. Speaking of her comeback, Womack said: "I am thrilled to be returning to the role of Ronnie for the next six months. Ronnie is coming out of prison and her reappearance in [Albert] Square is going to create havoc. I can't wait to be a Mitchell once again!" EastEnders' executive producer Lorraine Newman added: "We're delighted to announce Samantha Womack's return to Albert Square. The Mitchell sisters are a fabulous pairing and it will be an absolute delight to have Ronnie and Roxy back together on screen. However, Ronnie's departure wasn't without controversy for many residents in Walford, and her return will be sure to ruffle quite a few feathers."

Womack filmed her first scenes in summer 2013 and returned on screen from 9 September 2013 for two three-month-long stints. She returned to filming full-time on 24 July 2014 and returned to screens on 25 September 2014.

=== Departure and death (2017) ===
On 13 August 2016, it was reported that new producer Sean O'Connor had offered Womack a "dramatic ending" to Ronnie's storylines and that Womack had accepted. Her departure scenes were broadcast on 1 January 2017.

Following the New Year's Day episode in which Ronnie and Roxy were killed off after drowning in a swimming pool, the BBC released a 10-second alternate ending clip on their Snapchat account, in which Ronnie survives, finding Roxy's corpse on a pool table with Jack. It then cuts to a hospital, where Ronnie is shown grieving when Roxy dies in hospital from a suspected drug overdose. Ronnie's death episode aired on 1 January 2017, but she made a further appearance on 5 January, in the wedding video which Jack watches. She was also credited in another episode on 19 January 2017, making her last appearance as a corpse when Jack says goodbye to her.

== Storylines ==
=== 2007–2011 ===
Having been running a bar in Ibiza, Ronnie Mitchell and her younger sister Roxy (Rita Simons) visit Walford to support their cousin Phil (Steve McFadden) on his wedding to his fiance Stella Crawford (Sophie Thompson). It discloses that the sisters have also come to see their aunt Peggy Mitchell (Barbara Windsor) and stay to run The Queen Victoria while she is on holiday.

Ronnie goes into partnership with businessman Jack Branning (Scott Maslen), purchasing a nightclub, R&R, together, and begin an on-off relationship. During a period of separation, Roxy becomes pregnant by Jack after a one-night stand. Ronnie, unaware of who the father is, offers to support her sister and they briefly return to Ibiza. After an argument, Roxy visits their estranged father, Archie Mitchell (Larry Lamb), to Ronnie's horror. She is relieved when Roxy returns to the Square but horrified when Peggy announces that she and Archie are engaged. Roxy gives birth to a daughter, Amy Mitchell, named after Ronnie’s daughter who had died, according to Archie. Ronnie is hurt when she learns of Amy's paternity but eventually forgives them both.

Ronnie has a tumultuous relationship with employee, Danielle Jones (Lauren Crace), eventually leading to Danielle being sacked and Ronnie publicly berating her. Danielle is devastated, and is later seen clutching a locket containing a photograph of Ronnie, revealing herself to be Ronnie's daughter. It transpires that Danielle is the result of a teenage romance between Ronnie and her first boyfriend, Joel Reynolds (Cavan Clerkin). Archie disapproved of the pregnancy and put Danielle—named Amy by Ronnie—up for adoption against Ronnie’s wishes. Danielle was adopted by Lizzie and Andy Jones (Aneirin Hughes), and is now trying to locate her birth mother. On Archie and Peggy's wedding day, Danielle tells Ronnie that she is her daughter. Ronnie does not believe her because Archie told her that her daughter is dead, and throws her out. She later realises that Danielle was telling the truth and tries to apologise to Danielle, but she is hit by a car driven by Peggy's ex-stepdaughter Janine Butcher (Charlie Brooks) and dies in Ronnie's arms. Danielle's adoptive father, Andy, comes to takes her body back to Telford and bans Ronnie from the funeral, blaming her for Danielle’s death. Despite this, Ronnie goes to Telford and Danielle's best friend Stacey Slater (Lacey Turner) convinces Andy to talk to Ronnie about Danielle. Grieving for the daughter she was not allowed to raise, Ronnie becomes obsessed with having a baby. She tries tricking Jack into getting her pregnant and rekindles her romance with Joel until she learns that he has had a vasectomy. She gets pregnant by Owen Turner (Lee Ross), but miscarries when Archie pushes her into the bar during an argument. On Christmas Day 2009, Archie is murdered and Ronnie is arrested as a suspect, but released without charge. Danielle’s best friend, Stacey, is later revealed as Archie’s killer, and Ronnie learns that Archie raped Stacey. Ronnie tells a disbelieving Roxy that he had also raped her when she was 13. Stacey's late husband Bradley Branning (Charlie Clements) is posthumously assumed guilty of the murder after falling from the roof of the Queen Vic while trying to evade police arrest.

On Ronnie's birthday, Jack proposes and she accepts. When the issue of Archie raping Ronnie arises again, Peggy refuses to believe it but later learns that Ronnie is telling the truth, and that Ronnie and Roxy's mother, Glenda (Glynis Barber), knew but did not stop it. Ronnie learns of this and disowns her, though later when Ronnie reveals to a departing Peggy that she is pregnant with Jack's child, Peggy advises Ronnie to give Glenda another chance. Ronnie's cousin Sam (Danniella Westbrook) gives birth to a son, Richard. She learns that Jack is Richard's father, following a brief relationship. When Sam feels unable to cope with motherhood, they agree that Richard will live with Jack and Ronnie but, having given a child up for adoption, Ronnie can see that Sam is having doubts. Consequently, Ronnie gives Sam money so she and Richard can leave Walford together. She and Jack marry and prepare for the birth of their child. Ronnie bonds with a pregnant Kat Moon (Jessie Wallace) over being sexually abused as children and have given up their first child. When Ronnie learns that Stacey killed Archie, she allows her to leave the country after the police are called, feeling that Stacey has suffered enough.

With Jack abroad on business, Ronnie gives birth to a boy called James Branning, but he dies of sudden infant death syndrome within a day of being born. In a moment of desperation, Ronnie swaps her dead child with Kat's newborn son - Tommy. Almost instantly, Ronnie regrets her actions. She then tries to swap the babies back, but it is too late as James has been found and Jack has met Tommy upon returning - thinking he is his son. Kat is left distraught, believing her son is dead. Ronnie struggles to bond with Tommy and refuses to let anyone see him. She is refused permission to attend James's funeral but goes anyway. At the wake, she gives Tommy to Kat but her intention is misunderstood and leads Jack to think she needs psychiatric help. Ronnie discovers that Kat's cousin-in-law and Roxy’s boyfriend, Michael Moon (Steve John Shepherd) is Tommy's birth father, and tries to sabotage his relationships with Roxy and Jack so he will leave Walford, but Michael convinces Jack that Ronnie is obsessed with him. Unable to explain her actions, Ronnie agrees that she needs professional help and visits a counsellor, but leaves before the session and lies to Jack about it. Glenda realises that Ronnie is not attending counselling but is forced to leave Walford, after she is exposed for sleeping with her nephew by marriage, Phil. Ronnie briefly goes missing, and after Jack brings her home, her behaviour becomes increasingly erratic. After visiting the hospital where James was born, she finally admits the truth and returns Tommy to Kat.

Questioned at the police station about her mental health, Ronnie admits that she has been having flashbacks since Danielle's death. She is remanded in custody and asks Jack to forget about her and move on. Roxy convinces Ronnie to apply for bail, which she is granted. Jack forgives her and they resume their relationship. When Ronnie refuses Michael’s repeated advances, he attempts to frame Ronnie for kidnapping Tommy a second time, so she will get a custodial sentence. She is sentenced to three years and as she is being taken away, Kat tells her that she forgives her. Ronnie then says goodbye to Roxy, telling her that she was the one looking after her for the last few years. Ronnie sits alone in her cell, holding Danielle's locket, having finally found peace. Jack tries to visit Ronnie but she refuses to see him and in December 2011, she files for divorce.

=== 2013–2017 ===
In September 2013, Roxy, Jack and Kat are notified that Ronnie is being released from prison. Roxy wants to meet her, but Tommy's stepfather Alfie Moon (Shane Richie) - who Roxy is now engaged to - protests. Kat goes instead and brings Ronnie back to Albert Square. Alfie insists Ronnie keep her distance, when he finds the sisters reminiscing with Tommy, nearby. As a result, Roxy cuts ties with Ronnie and spends time healing things with Alfie, away from the Square. During this time, Ronnie reconciles with Jack, but when it comes to going public, Jack cannot do it and decides to leave Walford. Ronnie's cousin, Phil, puts Ronnie in charge of his businesses, while he recovers from a car accident. She makes an enemy in Carl White (Daniel Coonan), when he attempts to muscle in on the businesses. When Roxy returns to the Square, she and Ronnie make peace but Ronnie becomes suspicious about Alfie's feelings for Kat. She is proved right when he leaves Roxy just after their wedding ceremony. Roxy then starts dating Carl and when Ronnie fails to pull her back together, she convinces Phil to sell The Queen Vic, the pub that Kat and Alfie lease from him, to force them out of Walford. However, Roxy continues to see Carl and Ronnie decides to take Roxy and Amy to Ibiza. When Carl learns about this, he threatens to rape Ronnie and, when he attacks her, she kills him in self-defence by slamming the boot of the car onto his head. She and Roxy then leave for Ibiza, after disposing of the body and only Phil is aware of her actions.

When they return, two months later, Ronnie reveals that she has bought the local gym. She learns that Sharon Rickman (Letitia Dean) and Shirley Carter (Linda Henry) know what happened to Carl and tells Roxy the truth, who accepts Ronnie's explanation of the incident. Carl's family put pressure on Ronnie as they ask about Carl's whereabouts. When they realise that Ronnie has something to do with his disappearance, Carl's brother, Adam White (Ben Wigzell), snatches Lola Pearce's (Danielle Harold) daughter, Lexi Pearce, while she is in the care of Ronnie and Roxy. Ronnie and Phil track her down and Ronnie hires Aleks Shirovs (Kristian Kiehling) to beat Adam up. The following month, Ronnie accidentally runs Lola over, in the same spot where Danielle died. Ronnie is full of remorse for her actions and Lola soon forgives her, realising that Ronnie never intended to harm her.

Ronnie has a brief relationship with Charlie Cotton (Declan Bennett), the grandson of local gossip Dot Branning (June Brown), after confiding to him about her ordeal with Danielle's death. Ronnie and Roxy buy 27 Albert Square, after deciding that Phil's house is too crowded, but after revealing that she is pregnant to Phil, Ronnie decides to leave. Ronnie returns several months later, as requested by Peggy to try to stop Phil and Sharon's wedding, revealing that she is five months pregnant with Charlie's baby. She moves back in with Roxy. Dot, disappointed about the idea of her great-grandchild being born out of wedlock, persuades Charlie to propose to Ronnie. She admits that she has killed a man and, in return, he admits that he is not a police officer and has been lying to Dot about Nick Cotton's (John Altman) death. Nick returns to Walford and reveals himself to Dot. Ronnie tells Charlie that she wants him gone. She threatens Nick, saying that he doesn't know what she's capable of. She asks Phil to give her the money stolen from her and Roxy so she can get rid of Nick, but he refuses. Ronnie steals all the money in his safe. On their wedding day, Phil finds out about the money, and agrees to kill Nick. He overhears this and angrily cuts the brakes on Ronnie's car. She goes into labour during the wedding reception, and Roxy and Charlie rush her to hospital, but crash the car in the square due to the cut brakes. Ronnie is rushed to hospital in a critical condition, where her son Matthew is delivered by an emergency Caesarean section. She is revived at the last minute, but is placed in a coma for several weeks, before she is finally woken up.

After two further months of rehabilitation, Vincent Hubbard (Richard Blackwood), a man who it is revealed Ronnie was seeing in the autumn of 2013, visits her. Roxy breaks down and admits that, while she was in her coma, she slept with Charlie in their upsets. Ronnie forgives her and tries to move forward, but has doubts about her marriage. When Vincent's wife Kim Fox-Hubbard (Tameka Empson) discovers that Ronnie and Vincent had dated before, she accuses Ronnie of having an affair with him, but she assures her that they are no longer together. On returning home, Ronnie sets up cameras to spy on Charlie and Roxy, paranoid they might sleep together again. Roxy starts a secret relationship with Dean Wicks (Matt Di Angelo), and Ronnie is furious when she finds out, as Dean raped Linda Carter (Kellie Bright). Dean finds Ronnie's hidden cameras, and Roxy moves out, feeling violated. Ronnie kisses and sleeps with Vincent again, despite them both being married. Ronnie admits she doesn't love Charlie, and ends their marriage. Charlie and Roxy come up with a plan to flee to France with Matthew, but Roxy secretly tells Ronnie and they plan to double cross Charlie and get him arrested. However, events backfire and Ronnie nearly loses Matthew, though Charlie returns to Walford soon after. Ronnie asks Vincent to help her get rid of Charlie, and he disappears, with Roxy finding his discarded wallet. She later asks Honey Mitchell (Emma Barton) to move in with her.

When Dean becomes increasingly controlling over Roxy, Ronnie asks Linda's help to get rid of him. Linda turns her away, but her fiancé, Dean's brother Mick Carter (Danny Dyer), later visits Ronnie and agrees to help her. However, he cannot go through with the plan at the last minute. Dean and Roxy decide to move away, upsetting Ronnie, so she gets Billy to rob his salon. However, Dean realises she was behind it, so proposes to Roxy in front of Ronnie. She tries to pay him off to leave, but he realises she is recording their conversation, so plays it to Roxy at their engagement party. They argue, and Ronnie smashes up the Albert bar, before she tells her relative Billy Mitchell (Perry Fenwick) she is going to kill Dean. He warns Mick, and eventually Dean's parents Buster Briggs (Karl Howman) and Shirley, who arrive after Ronnie has given him a drink full of crushed up drugs. She reveals it was only a plan to scare him, but it is enough to make Roxy confess to Dean that Ronnie is a murderer, so he convinces Roxy to go to the police. Ronnie is seemingly arrested during a family dinner with the Mitchells. However, Ronnie realises they aren't police, and they drop her off in a wasteland, only for her to be picked up by Vincent. He tells her the police are going to charge her for Carl's murder, and she needs to get out of the country. She decides to confess to the police, but Vincent admits that he is a police informant, and Ronnie agrees to leave. However, Fatboy (Ricky Norwood) gives her a file he found in Vincent's safe, revealing he is working to take down the Mitchells. Vincent tries to blackmail her into framing Phil for drug trafficking, using a confession of her admitting to killing Carl. Phil, who has returned to drinking, disowns Ronnie, but she still protects him when Vincent plants a gun on him and calls the police. After, Ronnie destroys the copies of her confession and keeps the gun, threatening to kill Vincent if he threatens her again.

Ronnie learns that Vincent is seeking revenge on Phil because Phil's father Eric (George Russo) killed Vincent's father Henry. The tensions between the Mitchells and the Hubbards increase when Phil snatches Vincent's infant daughter, Pearl Fox-Hubbard. Ronnie helps negotiate what she thinks is a truce between the two men, but Fatboy informs her that Vincent is still planning to kill Phil. She organises for men to take Vincent, lock him in the boot of his car and have it crushed. She is distracted when Jack returns to spend Christmas with Amy. When Ronnie sees Vincent and he has no knowledge of the car, she realises the men put someone else in the car boot, but finds it has already been taken to be crushed. After Ronnie tells Vincent what she had planned, he goes to the scrapyard and finds Fatboy is dead. He decides not to tell Ronnie this, and lies that the boot was empty. Ronnie then rekindles her relationship with Jack. She learns from Mick of Dean's attempted rape of Roxy, and Roxy plans to move to Portugal. Glenda returns and tells Ronnie to stop Roxy from leaving but they are unsuccessful when Roxy says Ronnie has controlled her and she needs to be alone. Ronnie re-evaluates her life and, believing that this is the reason why she and Jack are no longer together, asks Jack to leave with Amy as she too needs to be alone. Glenda tells Ronnie that Eric could not have killed Henry and that Vincent's mother, Claudette Hubbard (Ellen Thomas), must be lying to him. Ronnie tells Claudette to remain civil towards the Mitchells or she will tell Vincent what she knows.

Ronnie later persuades Phil to come to Billy and Honey's engagement party where he coughs up blood and in hospital, the Mitchells are told Phil will be dead within twelve months unless he stops drinking and has a liver transplant. Ronnie then discovers that Joel has died. Ronnie learns that Phil must remain sober for at least six months before he can undergo the liver transplant, so she vows to help him regain his sobriety. She is stunned when Joel's daughter, Hannah Reynolds (Mia Jenkins), arrives, accusing her of killing Joel. Feeling remorseful, Ronnie tries to give Hannah's uncle Tim Reynolds (Charlie Baker) a cheque of £5,000 to help look after Hannah and her sisters, but Hannah tears it up. Jack later returns after Honey persuades him to but leaves again after Ronnie tells him they would not be together again. Tim also returns and tries to kiss Ronnie. She decides she still loves Jack, but believing he is getting married, she decides to stop the wedding but when she gets there, Jack is simply a guest at the wedding. Jack and Ronnie have sex but she returns to Walford alone, fearing she will break Jack's heart. However, Jack follows her and says he wants to spend his life with her. Unknown to Ronnie, a stalker leaves a wreath outside her house saying "RIP Ronnie Mitchell". Funeral director Les Coker (Roger Sloman) informs Ronnie that someone emailed him that she had died, so Jack wonders who might want revenge on her and Sharon tells him she killed Carl, which angers him until Ronnie says it was self-defence. Ronnie receives flowers with a card reading "RIP", and discovers the person who sent them gave their name as Danielle Jones. Ronnie confronts Hannah, who denies it all and Ronnie believes her, but Jack discovers Hannah's name was on the credit card that paid for the flowers, so Ronnie tells Hannah she knows she sent the flowers. Hannah steps into the road while holding Matthew and is nearly hit by a car. She is arrested for harassing Ronnie. However, Ronnie is still being watched by someone else. Ronnie becomes friends with Andy Flynn (Jack Derges), a builder who is helping Jack to renovate Max's old house into flats. Ronnie speaks in Hannah's defence in court and the charges are dropped. Hannah insists that she did not send Ronnie any death threats and she must have another enemy. Ronnie is concerned when Roxy returns, having been beaten up. Ronnie gives Roxy cash to pay off a debt, but Roxy leaves. Andy is then seen looking at newspaper stories about Ronnie that he has collected. Andy is exposed as the stalker but also revealed as Danielle's adoptive brother, Gareth Jones; Ronnie and he make amends after a heart to heart. He remorsefully leaves Walford. Ronnie and Jack get engaged. Ronnie supports Roxy through Dean's trial, comforting her when he is acquitted.

Ronnie and Jack decide to move to Ongar, Essex, to Roxy's displeasure, as Amy would be moving with them. However, Ronnie then suggests that Roxy move to a nearby house in the same town. Roxy suspects that Jack and Honey are having an affair, and tells Ronnie, who confronts Jack. He denies this, and later, Roxy decides Amy should move without her and then asks Ronnie to adopt Amy. After an emotional discussion, Ronnie agrees, but later, the sisters secretly plan for Roxy to join the couple in Essex.

However, on her wedding day, Roxy packs her things, as she reveals she is moving away to live with Glenda and Danny, feeling as if she will ruin Ronnie's happiness. After an argument, Ronnie convinces Roxy to give her away, and she agrees. While on the way to the wedding, Ronnie and Roxy visit Phil for a final time and take a picture with him, unbeknownst to him that it will be the last time he sees them. At the wedding, Roxy begins to break down, says she cannot give Ronnie away, and runs out.

Ronnie is unable to face Jack and runs off in tears, later revealing she wishes Roxy to move with them, and will not accept any other outcome. Jack eventually accepts, and they marry on New Year's Day 2017, after Roxy gives her away. Later, the two sisters get drunk after a happy day and wander outside the hotel; precariously perched on the hotel roof, still drinking champagne, they discuss their time in the square and the start of a new era. Looking for Ronnie's lost bridal shoe, they accidentally find the hotel swimming pool, and Roxy jumps in. Ronnie is unable to remove her wedding dress, and sees Roxy motionless, having sunk to the bottom of the pool. Ronnie jumps in to rescue her, but is entangled by her wedding dress and drowns alongside her sister just before midnight as Jack reads Cinderella to the children.

The following morning, police find their bodies in the pool, and inform Jack's brother Max Branning (Jake Wood), who then breaks the news to a devastated Jack. A few days later, Jack receives their wedding video, and watches Ronnie saying how much she loves him; he is emotional watching it. Jack later visits her body in the chapel of rest, a day before her and Roxy's funerals, and says an emotional farewell to her. At the inquest into Ronnie and Roxy's deaths, their deaths are ruled as misadventure.

== Reception ==
=== Critical response ===
Following their introductory episode in July 2007, both Mitchell sisters were received favourably by Mark Wright of The Stage. He commented that they established themselves quickly, deeming them "in the same tradition of strong soap women that 'Enders seems to have been lacking since the exit of Kat Moon", a popular character who left the serial in 2005, but returned along with Alfie Moon in 2010. He added that Womack "brings a calm but firm presence to the table as Ronnie."

Radio Times included Ronnie in their November 2009 feature profiling bunny boilers. As Ronnie's behaviour has grown more desperate on-screen they stated: "Initially the more sensible of the Mitchell sisters, Ronnie has spiralled into instability since daughter Danielle's death, becoming E20's own succubus, trying to trick any man into getting her pregnant." They commented on the fact she has tried to fall pregnant with Jack, Ryan, Joel and Owen and joked that she should try it on with Darren Miller. Holy Soap recall Ronnie's most memorable moment as being finding out Danielle is her daughter and her subsequent death. In 2020, Sara Wallis and Ian Hyland from The Daily Mirror placed Ronnie 26th on their ranked list of the Best EastEnders characters of all time, calling her an "Ice queen".

=== Accolades ===
Womack won the 2008 Daily Star Soaper Star "Best Newcomer" award for her portrayal of Ronnie. She and Simons were awarded the "Best On-Screen Partnership" accolade at the 2008 Digital Spy Soap Awards, and were nominated in the same category at The British Soap Awards, where the following year, Womack was nominated "Best Actress". Ronnie and Danielle's relationship was named "Best Storyline" at the 2009 Inside Soap Awards, and "Best Soap Storyline" at the TV Quick and TV Choice Awards, where Womack was additionally shortlisted for the "Best Soap Actress" accolade. At the All About Soap Bubble Awards, Ronnie and Jack were nominated for the "Fatal Attraction" award in 2008, and Ronnie was nominated in the "I'm a Survivor" category in 2010. In August 2017, Womack and Simons were longlisted for Best Exit at the Inside Soap Awards, while Ronnie and Roxy's deaths were longlisted for Best Show-Stopper. Both nominations made their shortlists, but they did not win any awards.
