= Carl White =

British fictional TV character

- EastEnders character
- Portrayed by: Daniel Coonan
- Duration: 2013–2014
- First appearance: Episode 4660; 20 June 2013
- Last appearance: Episode 4775/4776; 1 January 2014
- Introduced by: Lorraine Newman
In-universe information
- Mother: Nora White
- Brothers: Adam White

Carl White is a fictional character from the BBC soap opera EastEnders, played by Daniel Coonan. He first appears in the 4660th episode, originally broadcast in the United Kingdom on 20 June 2013. Carl is the ex-fiancé of Kirsty Branning (Kierston Wareing), and his storylines include tracking down cash owed to him by Derek Branning (Jamie Foreman) – which Ian Beale (Adam Woodyatt) has used to open a restaurant; trying to win Kirsty back; a relationship with Roxy Mitchell (Rita Simons); his feuds with Roxy's cousin Phil (Steve McFadden) and Derek's brother Max (Jake Wood); blackmailing Ian for money; and developing a conflict with Roxy's sister Ronnie (Samantha Womack) that ultimately results in his downfall. He became the show's main antagonist up until his death on 1 January 2014. The character was axed in September 2013 and departed in the episode first broadcast in the UK on 1 January 2014, a joint broadcast of episodes 4775 and 4776, after being killed by Ronnie.

== Development ==
=== Casting ===
Coonan's casting as Carl was announced on 6 May 2013, when it was revealed that the character is Kirsty Branning's (Kierston Wareing) ex-boyfriend and has been in prison, where he had shared a cell with Derek Branning (Jamie Foreman). Coonan said of his casting, "EastEnders has been a part of my life since I was 12 years old. I even remember talking about the storylines in school playgrounds in Tottenham and I am very happy and proud to now be a small part of its life." Executive producer Lorraine Newman said: "It's wonderful to have Daniel Coonan joining us in Walford to play Carl White. Oozing confidence and with a dangerous edge, will Kirsty be able to resist his bad boy charms for long, or can [Kirsty's husband] Max [Brannning] save her from the lure of the dark side?" This is Coonan's second role in EastEnders, as he played David Priors in 2011. Coonan said the four-episode role helped him prepare for a bigger role in the programme, though describing his first day on set as Carl, he said, "it still hits you when you walk on to the Square for the very first time. It's like walking into your TV." Coonan filmed his first scene on the Bridge Street market set. Heat reported that Carl's introduction was part of a "rescue plan" to increase ratings for EastEnders, especially with the announced departures of popular characters Tanya Branning (Jo Joyner), Jack Branning (Scott Maslen) and Michael Moon (Steve John Shepherd), saying "with ever-dwindling ratings and an unusually bare trophy cabinet, producers have been forced to plan some major shake-ups in an attempt to revive the ailing drama with new characters, returning familiar faces and exciting storylines." Coonan later said of being cast, "When they offered the part of Carl to me, I thought about it as long as it takes to blink your eyelids. I knew it would be a great character and fun to play. Something like this can massively raise your profile. I'm beaming into thousands of people's homes four times a week." Coonan was originally contracted to appear in 28 episodes over a six-month period, but instead filmed over 60 episodes. After Danny Dyer was cast as Mick Carter in the show, he revealed that he was approached to play Carl.

=== Characterisation ===
Carl is characterised as an unemployed man who has spent five and a half years in prison for drug offences. His backstory on the EastEnders website states that he grew up on a tough south London estate with his brothers. Upon his announcement, he was described as confident, dangerous and charming, while many news reports referred to him as a "bad boy" character. Coonan called the character a dark horse, very clever, manipulative and "slippery", and said that Carl is "exciting to play" because he is unpredictable, adding that you should always expect the unexpected with Carl. He compared the character to other villains from the series, saying he is "right up there with them." Inside Soap called Carl "nasty" and "evil", and said that he fills the "super-villain" role last taken by Derek, hoping that he would "shake the Square to its foundations." Heat said of Carl, "there's a new baddie in town and he's proper scary." Soaplife reported that Carl would be the show's "toughest bad guy yet". Digital Spy called him "cunning and ruthless".

Coonan hoped that Carl would be as devious as original villain Den Watts (Leslie Grantham), hoping for "spicy storylines" for his character, who is "a bad guy" and "pretty nasty" with "a dark way of going about things." However, he hoped that Carl would have redeeming qualities and that he would not be "a total arch-villain". He also compared Carl to William Shakespeare's Iago (from Othello), and said Carl is a film fan who would compare himself to Al Pacino in films such as Scarface and The Godfather. He also said Carl presents "different fronts to different people" and opined that there is "a bit of nice in him", but he likes to dominate, make money and have influence, and would not be good until he achieves that. He wondered if Carl would be capable of settling down and starting a family. On playing a villain, Coonan said, "It is good fun playing the bad guys. They are the always the best to play. They do not care how people perceive them. They do not have the normal social restrictions." He said that Carl is "slightly psychotic" and is "the sort of person who finds it genuinely heartwarming to see people suffer". In October 2013, Coonan said that Carl had been "an absolute bastard" during his six months in the show.

Carl's profile on the official EastEnders website says he is "seductive" and can draw people to him, especially women, and can easily fool people. He can read people quickly, understanding what they want, and can tell who has power, but is waiting for a moment when he can take it for himself because he enjoys having power. He rarely gets into fights, is unsympathetic and angry, becoming suspicious of everybody. He is entrepreneurial, pragmatic and ingenious, and could have been a successful businessman if he did not choose a life of crime, though it was the only way he knew to get women, cars and money. He will do whatever he can to get what he wants. In August 2013, Coonan said, "I wouldn't mess with a man like Carl—I would stay indoors a lot more if I'd got on the wrong of someone like him. He's someone who doesn't care and who'll go to any lengths to take people out." In the run-up to Carl's departure, All About Soap called him "a horrible bloke". Heat said Carl "thinks he's hard as nails, but compared to [Ronnie, who attacks him], he's just a big old pussycat."

=== Storylines and relationships ===
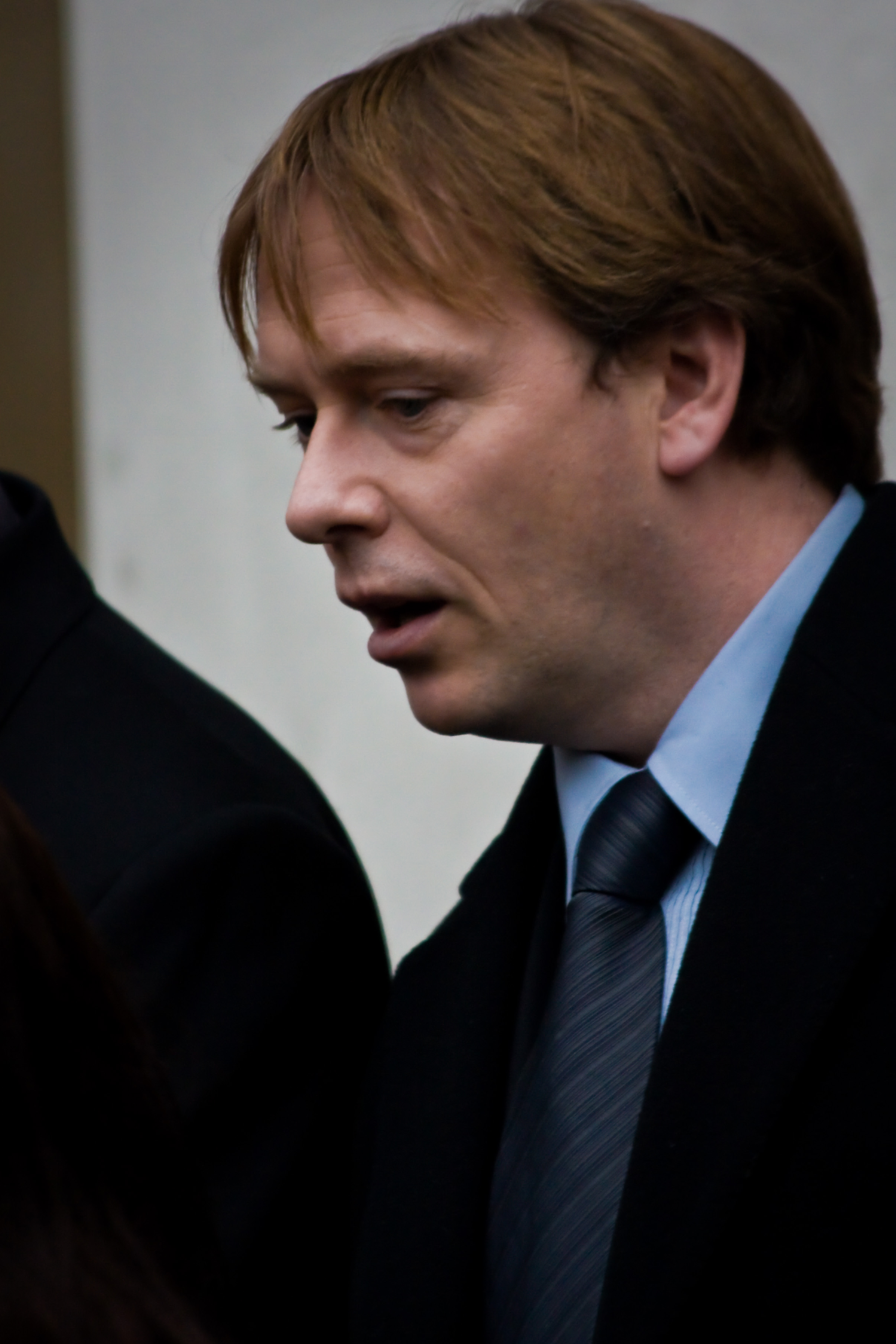
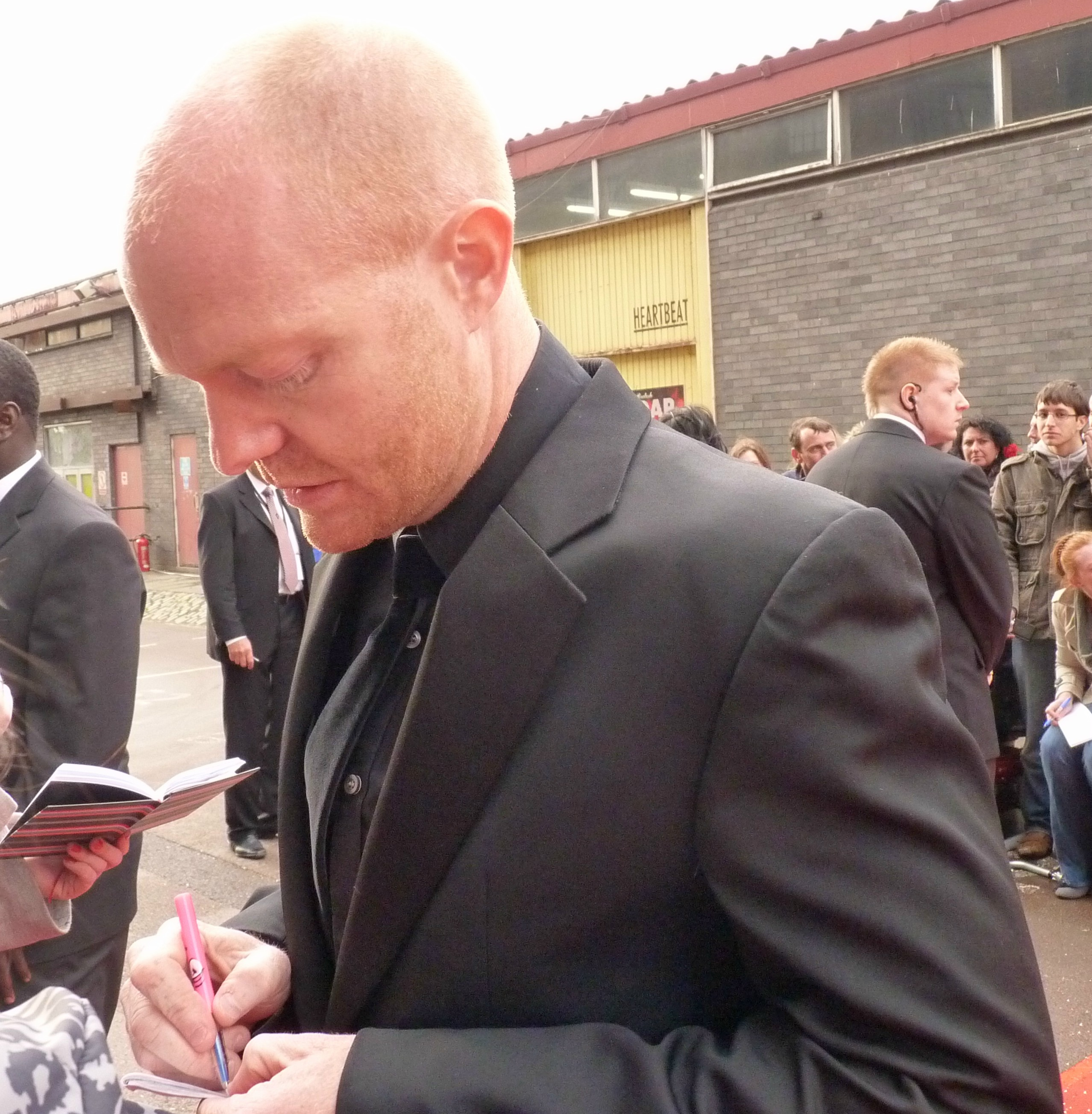
Adam Woodyatt (left) and Jake Wood (right) play Ian Beale and Max Branning. Ian is fearful of Carl.

Carl is brought to Walford by Bianca Butcher (Patsy Palmer) after she finds his telephone number in her uncle Derek's belongings. Derek had stolen Carl's money and Carl wants it back, though it has been found by Ian Beale (Adam Woodyatt) following Derek's death, and he has spent it. Coonan said, "the only way Carl knows how to get that cash back is to threaten people." He said that getting the money back is his first mission in Walford. Digital Spy said that Carl "leaves Ian Beale fearing for his life".

Carl is Kirsty's ex-boyfriend, and Coonan explained that they were in a relationship before he went to prison. Carl was in his early 20s and Kirsty was 16 when they met and he became obsessive of her. Their relationship was based on hedonism and excess, rather than tenderness. When he went to prison, Kirsty promised to wait for him to be released, but she realised their relationship was toxic and ceased all contact. She then went on to marry Max. Carl is still in love with Kirsty, believing her to be "the only woman for him" and his second mission in Walford is to get her back. Coonan said this would cause problems between Carl and Max. He later said that "In Carl's head, he's coming in on a white horse to save Kirsty from a bad marriage", and explained that while Carl was in prison he focussed on Kirsty, and she "become an object of this freedom he was dreaming about. [...] Now he sees she's poodling after Max and that he isn't treating her right." However, he thought that Kirsty may not want to reunite with Carl because "he's not the type of guy who's just going to change overnight" and he is probably not "the knight in shining armour" he thinks he is. Coonan went on to say that Carl would treat Kirsty "like a goddess" but would probably have a problem with her independence, and he would want to provide for her, being "old-fashioned and a bit misguided", and they would have a "fiery" relationship because they are both "strong-willed". Kierston Wareing, who plays Kirsty, opined that her character is more suited to Carl than to Max, and hoped they could be a "manipulative, power couple".

In July 2013, Carl's mother Nora White is introduced for a single episode, played by Lynn Farleigh, when he and Kirsty visit her in a nursing home. Inside Soap said that Nora is "pure, unbridled evil" and her introduction might show why Carl is a menace, giving viewers a "glimpse into [his] twisted upbringing". They said there is tension between Carl and Nora, and compared her digging her fingernails into his hand to his burning of Ian's hand, asking "has Carl learnt everything he knows from his evil mum?" Coonan said that Nora is "dominating and horrible" and shows that Carl has "demons within his own family" and a "troubled background".

Inside Soap hoped that Carl would "give notorious bad boy Phil Mitchell a run for his money", and Coonan said that he had filmed scenes with Steve McFadden, who plays Phil, saying that "You can only have so many alpha males in one place before it kicks off!" On 11 July 2013, it was reported that Carl and Phil would be involved in a "massive car accident which leaves both men unconscious", caused by Carl. The storyline involves a flipped car and a helicopter, from which a birds-eye view of the crash scene is seen. It is reported to have cost £1 million to make. The crash was filmed over two days and was directed by Michael Owen Morris, who had to create what was originally scripted as "car hits wall" and compared it to a James Bond film. Newman said the crash was "A suitably explosive start to a jam-packed autumn and winter full of love, romance and reprisals", while a show insider said, "The crash is going to change things for many residents in Albert Square. There will be serious repercussions and with the twists and turns we have planned for the aftermath, everything might not be as it seems."

Coonan spoke to David Brown from Radio Times about the crash, where it was said that Carl would "show just how evil he can be" by causing it. Coonan said that Carl causes the crash because he wants to depose Phil as "top boy" in Albert Square, saying it is "such an insane thing to do. You get to see how nuts Carl is. He doesn't care if Phil dies yet he risks damaging himself as well. [...] He realises he will have to get rid of him." He also said that Phil is a "major barrier" for Carl getting what he wants, so he could either go into business with Phil or eliminate him. On filming the crash, Coonan explained that he was inside the car when the glass was detonated, and he suffered cuts on his leg and hand. Brown said the crash looks "visceral and intense" on screen, and said that Phil is not scared of Carl because he sees him as a "wannabe" and a "young pretender", but added that "there is obviously more to [Carl] than [Phil] realises."

On 3 September 2013, it was reported in the Daily Star that Carl would be buried in a shallow grave by Phil and Max. Danny Walker from the Daily Mirror said, "if you try and kill a Mitchell and blame Max Branning for cutting the brakes, it will have repercussions."

Coonan revealed that in the run-up to his departure, Carl becomes a "bit of a lone wolf" after giving up trying to win Kirsty back, and said he has no friends because he has threatened everyone. Coonan shares scenes with actresses Samantha Womack, who plays Ronnie Mitchell, and Rita Simons, who plays Roxy Mitchell, but the actor explained that both characters realise that Carl is "a bit too dark to get involved with" and he is "probably going a bit mad because he can't get Kirsty back". It was reported on 1 December 2013 that Roxy would "seek solace" in Carl after her marriage is annulled, but Shane Richie, who plays Roxy's ex-husband Alfie Moon, said Roxy is doing it because she has "her freedom back—and she'll be throwing it in Alfie's face", despite being warned off Carl by Ronnie and Phil. Soaplife said that Roxy is "hooked on the excitement of being with Carl." Ronnie and Carl then start a feud, and it was reported that it would "come to a head with some dark twists", and that "One last showdown then sees Ronnie get rid of Carl forever."

=== Departure ===
On 24 September 2013, it was announced that Carl, along with three other characters—Kirsty Branning (Kierston Wareing), Poppy Meadow (Rachel Bright) and AJ Ahmed (Phaldut Sharma)—had been axed from the series by the new executive producer Dominic Treadwell-Collins. It was reported that Treadwell-Collins was "determined to get EastEnders back to its best" and a spokesperson confirmed the departures. Reports said that it was hoped the move would increase ratings, and a show source added that "[Treadwell-Collins] didn't feel the characters who are leaving fit with the direction he is taking the show so he quickly decided to write them out. He has only been in a month but he is already making big changes. He knows what he wants for EastEnders and is putting plans in place quickly." Coonan filmed his final scenes before Christmas 2013 and departed in 2014.

Coonan hoped the character would "go out in a blaze of glory", saying "That would be a kind of logical end for him. Either marry him off or blow him up!" He felt that the producers no longer wanted bad characters in EastEnders, saying "they want [it] to be about love and deceit." He had hoped that other sides to the character could have been explored, such as Carl winning Kirsty back and then trying to stay out of trouble but failing, or turning them into a criminal couple while showing Carl's "more human side".

== Storylines ==
Carl arrives at Bianca Butcher's (Patsy Palmer) house, after she telephones him thinking his number belonged to her father David Wicks (Michael French). Bianca assumes Carl is the plumber, but when the real plumber arrives, Carl says he is the friend of Derek Branning (Jamie Foreman) that Bianca called. He learns that Derek is dead, and claims to know his daughter Alice Branning (Jasmyn Banks), so Bianca gives him her address. He visits Alice, who gives him the box that contained the phone number, which Alice says was found by Ian Beale (Adam Woodyatt). Bianca's friend Kat Moon (Jessie Wallace) realises that Carl lied about knowing Alice and warns Alice and Bianca to be wary of him. Carl visits Ian, who denies knowing Derek. Carl realises Ian took £10,000 from the box that Derek owed him, and Ian is terrified of Carl. The next day, Carl sees his ex-girlfriend, Kirsty Branning (Kierston Wareing), who says she is now married and pregnant, and he has no reason to stay. At the restaurant, Carl makes Ian confess to taking his money, and tells Ian to pay him £500 a week for the foreseeable future. He then tells Kirsty he is not leaving. Ian soon realises the situation between Carl and Kirsty, so he threatens to tell Kirsty about Carl's blackmail. Carl responds by burning Ian's hand.

Joey Branning (David Witts) catches Carl dealing drugs in the nightclub, R&R and informs Phil Mitchell (Steve McFadden) and Kirsty's husband Max Branning (Jake Wood), who confront and threaten Carl and his brother Adam. Max calls the police because he thinks Carl is involved in Kirsty nearly getting mugged by Carl's brother Adam White (Ben Wigzell) and Carl is checked for drugs by the police in front of Kirsty. Carl has none, and later tells Max that in three weeks' time, he will end Max and Kirsty's relationship. Three weeks later, Carl deliberately cuts the brakes on his car, then takes Phil as his passenger, and crashes it after releasing Phil's seatbelt. Phil is hospitalised and Carl frames Max for cutting the brakes after forcing Ian to become a false witness, promising to cancel the debt. Max is arrested and released on bail, until Carl goads him into attacking him, and he is remanded in custody. Max ends his relationship with Kirsty under Carl's instructions, who has threatened to harm his daughter Lauren Branning (Jacqueline Jossa).

Carl attempts to take over Phil's businesses while he is in hospital, and after Shirley Carter (Linda Henry) challenges him, she mysteriously disappears. Carl attempts to reconcile with Kirsty but she rejects him. However, she later approaches him and they have sex, but he sees her stealing £1000 from him the next morning. On the day of Max's trial, Ian fails to turn up, and Max is released without charge, to Carl's fury. Max and Phil then kidnap Carl and Phil offers Max the chance to kill him. Max declines and leaves, so Phil prepares to kill him instead until Carl implies that he caused harm to Shirley and knows where she is. He leads Phil to a block of run-down flats where Shirley is staying with her sister, Tina Carter (Luisa Bradshaw-White). It is revealed that Carl threatened Shirley to stay away from Walford or he would harm Phil's family. Carl leaves, but Phil confronts him later. Carl declares that he has contacts inside prison who can harm his son if Phil does anything to him. Carl then tells Max that he had sex with Kirsty while he was in prison, leading to Max ending his relationship with Kirsty.

When Roxy Mitchell (Rita Simons) splits from her husband Alfie Moon (Shane Richie) immediately after their wedding, Carl flirts with a drunken Roxy. She insists she is not interested, but later waits outside his new flat and they have sex when he returns. They start a relationship, which Roxy's sister Ronnie Mitchell (Samantha Womack) disapproves of and tries to split them up. She confronts Carl, who is violent towards her and a final threat leads to her hitting him over the head with a champagne bottle; he falls unconscious. She ties him up in Phil's garage and the next day tells him to leave Walford and never return, but he ignores her and attempts to rape her, kissing her forcefully. She slams the boot of a car onto his head, killing him, and has the car crushed with his body inside.

== Reception ==
Carl's first episode, broadcast on 20 June at 7:30 pm on BBC One, received overnight ratings of 6.64 million, an audience share of 33.7%, while the BBC Three repeat, shown at 1 am on 21 June, was watched by 210,000 people, 8.3% of the total viewing audience at that time.

Gary Gillatt from Inside Soap wrote of Carl's arrival, "Walford's new super-villain shows big promise. We loved how Kat boldly shoved up her boobs the moment she saw Carl, but then had him pegged as a wrong'un in seconds. And [Ian is] scared—and so are we!" David Brown from the Radio Times said the character is "shaping up nicely" as the latest bad-boy character. He later stated that Carl could help increase ratings if viewers feared him, saying, "We're making some headway here with bad boy Carl, whose Robert De Niro routine is unsettling the locals. But, let's face it, his mother was ten times more intimidating and she was only in one episode. EastEnd life should always be a combination of charm and menace: for every Jack Branning, there should be a Trevor Morgan. Get Carl and his old ma to join forces—then we'd be getting somewhere."

Filipa Jodelka from The Guardian said, "Carl is an EastEnders speciality, a new character shoehorned in with a backstory that's not so much shadowy as completely obscured. Everyone seems to be scared of him, though, because apparently wandering around the Square silently pulling faces counts as menacing these days." Victoria Garo-Falides from the Daily Mirror said Carl is "on track to be the shortest, scariest man ever to walk the Square".

Coonan received a nomination for "best bad boy" at the 2013 Inside Soap Awards, on which he said "I was massively surprised to be nominated [...] because the story involving Carl and Max was only just starting to kick in." Coonan was not shortlisted for the award. He said that he was being recognised in public and that "everybody seems to really love the character".

When it was announced that Coonan would be leaving the show in 2014, Yahoo! TV UK said, "It's been enjoyable for a while—but there's only so many hardmen that the Square can handle." Vicky Prior from the Metro said, "I shall be glad to see the back of [Carl]." After Carl was killed off, Brown from Radio Times said Carl "won't be missed" because "His poor-man's Robert De Niro shtick was starting to grate and EastEnders has never really thrived when it's put pre-watershed gangsters centre stage."

== See also ==
- List of soap opera villains
