= Ecstasy (play) =

1979 play by Mike Leigh

- Daniel Coonan, Claire-Louise Cordwell, Sinead Matthews (detail of Tristram Kenton's photo of Leigh's 2011 production).
- Written by: Mike Leigh
- Original language: English
- Genre: Drama

Premiere
- Date premiered: 26 September 1979
- Place premiered: Hampstead Theatre; London Director - Mike Leigh

Ecstasy is a 1979 play by British playwright Mike Leigh with a six-character cast. It covers the life of four blue-collar friends living in a ratty area of London near Kilburn High Road and the drunken frustration in their lives, particularly that of the lead character Jean.

Jean is a suicidal garage attendant who sleeps with unsuitable men, like Roy, drinks heavily and has abortions. Her friend from Birmingham, Dawn, who has had three children, brings back her husband Mick, an Irish labourer, and his quiet friend, Len, to Jean's bleak Kilburn bedsitter, - 'their second act ensemble trumpets the dark night of the soul, in what is at once one of the best and gloomiest party scenes in contemporary drama.'

The play opened at the Hampstead Theatre on 26 September 1979. The production was designed by Alison Chitty, and the cast comprised Sheila Kelley as Jean, Ron Cook as Roy, Rachel Davies as Val, Julie Walters as Dawn, Stephen Rea as Mick, and Jim Broadbent as Len. For both Broadbent and Rea, this was the first of several collaborations with Leigh. A new production directed by Leigh, and starring Sian Brooke, Daniel Coonan, Claire Louise Cordwell, Allen Leech, Sinead Matthews, and Craig Parkinson opened on 10 March 2011 at the Hampstead Theatre, and transferred to the Duchess Theatre in Covent Garden on 12 April 2011.
