= Daniel Coonan =

British actor

Daniel Coonan is a British actor.

== Early life ==
Coonan was brought up in Haringey, in north London, moving to Plymouth, Devon in his teens, where he took up acting lessons. He trained at the London Academy of Music and Dramatic Art.

== Career ==
After graduating, Coonan spent over ten years working almost exclusively in theatre, working with companies including The National Theatre, The Royal Court Theatre and Howard Barker's theatre company, The Wrestling School. Coonan then had roles in various television series, including a wrongly convicted murderer in Silent Witness, an investigating policeman in the BBC crime drama Mayday, and a violent alcoholic in Mike Leigh's revival of his classic play Ecstasy, which Leigh directed.

In 2013, Coonan joined the cast of the BBC soap opera EastEnders, playing Carl White, having previously played David Priors in 2011. He was originally contracted to appear in 28 episodes as Carl over a six-month period, but filmed over 60 episodes. Coonan departed the show in January 2014. Since leaving, Coonan has again returned to the stage, playing 'Marco' in Arthur Miller's classic play 'A View From the Bridge' at The Liverpool Playhouse and 'Black Dog' in The Royal National Theatre's 2015 production of 'Treasure Island'.

In 2016 Coonan appeared in the Discovery Channel miniseries Harley and the Davidsons playing William A. Davidson, one of the founders of the Harley Davidson motorcycle company. He will be involved in filming History Channel's eight part drama documentary 'The War on Drugs' in early 2017 as well as the BBC drama 'Hard Sun', created by Neil Cross, the writer of 'Luther'.

== Selected theatre ==
Title	Location	Director
Storming: Young Writers Festival	Royal Court Theatre	Various
King Lear	Royal National Theatre	Richard Eyre
Peter Pan	Royal National Theatre	John Caird
Scenes from an Execution	The Wrestling School	Howard Barker
He Stumbled	Almeida Theatre	Howard Barker
Stop Kiss	Soho Theatre	Abigail Morris
The Woman in Black	West End	Robin Herford
The Way of the World	Northampton Theatre	Selina Cadell
Ecstasy	Hampstead Theatre	Mike Leigh

== Selected television ==
Year	Title	Role
1998	The Vanishing Man	Dominic
2000	Britannic	Seamus
2003	Seven Wonders of the Industrial World	Philippe Buñau-Varilla
2004	Casualty	Alec Facer
2005	Life Isn't All Ha Ha Hee Hee	Dean
2005	Sugar Rush	David
2007	Recovery	Electrician
2009	FM	Joe
2011	EastEnders	David Priors
2012	Inside Men	Kevin
2013	Mayday	PC Simmons
2013	Silent Witness	Simon Marshall
2013	Dancing on the Edge	Policeman
2013–2014	EastEnders	Carl White
2016	Harley and the Davidsons	William "Big Bill" Davidson
2018	Hard Sun	DCI Alex Butler
2020	Doctors	DI Mark Warrington
