= Mila Marwa =

Fictional EastEnders character

- EastEnders character
- Portrayed by: Ruhtxjiaïh Bèllènéa
- Duration: 2020–22
- First appearance: Episode 6182; 15 December 2020
- Last appearance: Episode 6427; 3 February 2022
- Introduced by: Jon Sen
In-universe information
- Other names: Robi Marwa
- Occupation: Barmaid
- Mother: Nyangi Marwa
- Sisters: Kioni Marwa

Mila Marwa is a fictional character from the BBC soap opera EastEnders, played by Ruhtxjiaïh Bèllènéa. She made her first appearance on 15 December 2020. Mila was initially introduced competition for Kim Fox (Tameka Empson) for a job in Walford's gay bar, the Prince Albert. Mila wins the job after impressing the bar's owner Kathy Beale (Gillian Taylforth), and she later moves in with Kathy and her family. Kim sets Mila up with Iqra Ahmed (Priya Davdra) and the pair begin dating. Mila's backstory was then explored when she reveals to Iqra that she is hiding from her homophobic family. Mila's mother, Nyangi Marwa (Lucy Vandi), was introduced and she attempts to get Mila to leave Walford and sets her up to marry a man, but Mila stands up to her.

Mila's sister, Kioni Marwa (Florisa Kamara), was then introduced in order for EastEnders to explore the issue of FGM. In the storyline, Mila reveals to Kathy and Iqra that she was a victim of FGM and she attempts to stop her sister from going through the same thing. Bèllènéa was glad to be involved in the story as she felt that it was an important topic that most people would not want to handle, and she felt a lot of responsibility to portray it with care and commitment. Mila and Iqra later seek custody of Kioni following Nyangi's arrest. In January 2022, it was announced that Bèllènéa would be departing the role, with it being reported that Mila and Kioni had been brought into the soap to explore FGM and thus would be departing at the result of the storyline's conclusion. Mila's departure saw her gain custody of Kioni and the sisters leaving to join Iqra in Bristol, with their last episode airing on 3 February 2022. Mila's FGM storyline was praised by critics and viewers for raising awareness around FGM. However, Mila and Kioni's departure was criticised for being disappointing.

== Development ==
=== Introduction and romance with Iqra ===
Bèllènéa made her first appearance as Mila on the episode airing on 15 December 2020. Mila is introduced as competition for Kim Fox (Tameka Empson) as they are both applying for a job at Walford's gay bar, the Prince Albert. Tensions "flare up" between the pair and they end up breaking a bottle after fighting for it. The bar's owner, Kathy Beale (Gillian Taylforth), is impressed when Mila takes responsibility for the incident and gives Mila the job. Mila would later move in with Kathy and her family. In February 2021, Mila is impressed by Kim's matchmaker venture, The Fox Catcher, and Kim offers to match her up with Iqra Ahmed (Priya Davdra), who has recently broken up with her girlfriend. The pair enjoy spending time together and their relationship later grows fast.

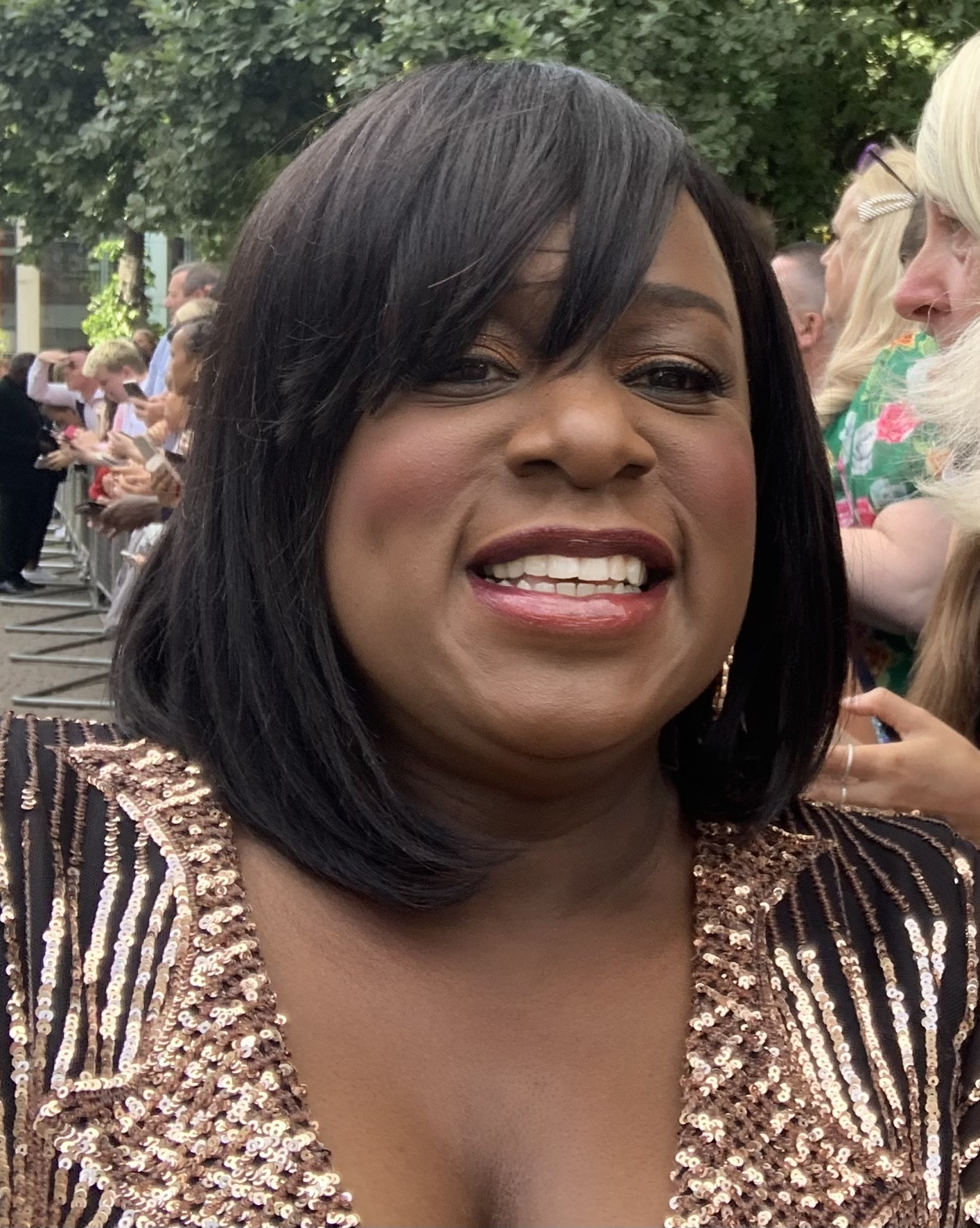
Tameka Empson portrays Kim Fox, who sets Mila up with Iqra.

Kim later decides to use the couple's success story as a feature in the Walford Gazette profile; Mila reluctantly agrees despite being "filled with dread", but she leaves when a photographer takes photos of her and goes into "meltdown". This storyline began the exploration of Mila's backstory, as it is revealed that Mila's family is homophobic and that Mila ran away from them and changed her name as she did not feel safe due to their extreme religious beliefs and homophobia. Discussing this, Davdra explained that Iqra does not what is happening with Mila and is confused as she initially agreed to do the featured and thus Iqra is shocked and "blames herself due to her past relationship". Davdra then revealed that Iqra learning about Mila's family's homophobia changes Iqra's perspective and allows the couple to connect, explaining, "Iqra has been through a similar thing, she came out only recently to her family so she definitely understands what Mila is going through and can advise her based on her experience". The actress added, "They share a similar experience of coming out and their cultural backgrounds. I feel like they are similar in certain areas, and then very different – opposites attract, but Mila does bring Iqra out of her shell". When Iqra finds out that the photo was posted online, she demands for it to be taken down; Mila is very panicked by this news as she does not want her family finding her, but she is also "touched" that Iqra is so apologetic. Verity Sulway from Digital Spy speculated that Mila could be hiding something as Mila's "smile" faded when Iqra promises to have no more secrets.

=== Introduction of family and FGM ===
Kim later accuses Mila of cheating when she spots her with a man, but Mila reveals that her mother has set her up to marry a man after seeing the picture of Mila and Iqra online. Mila is then left "in tears" after being made homeless by her flatmate and not being able to confront her mother, so Kathy ends up taking her in. Mila's mother, Nyangi Marwa (Lucy Vandi) refuses to accept Mila and ends up tracking Mila her down and orders her daughter to leave with her, but Kathy stands up to her and so does Mila, telling her mother that she is not going to get married and wants to stay in Walford. An "emboldened" Mila then sees Nyangi off and she ends up staying with Kathy.

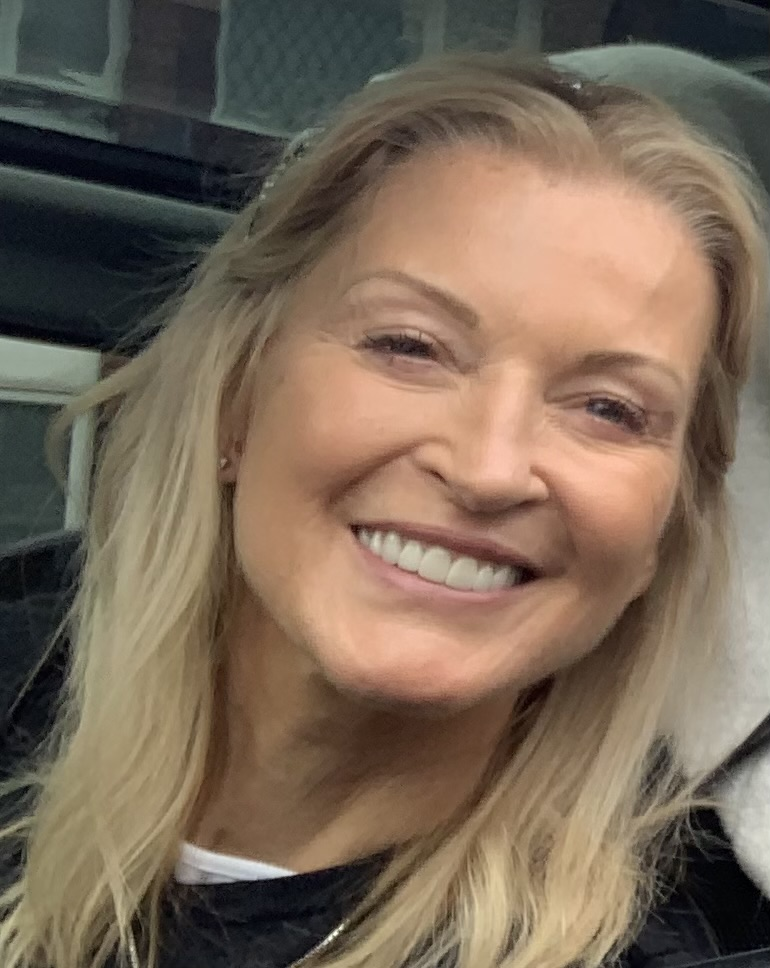
Gillian Taylforth portrays Kathy Beale, Mila's boss who lets her move in with her.

In May 2021, EastEnders spoilers revealed that Mila would become "confused and worried" when someone from her past shows up in her life. When Iqra is angry at Kim for putting their relationship on her website, she notices a girl stealing a candle and Mila realises that it is her sister, Kioni Marwa (Florisa Kamara). Mila becomes very worried when Kioni tells her that their mother is going to take her away for a "holiday" trip in a few weeks time. Feeling tensed and "filled with fear", Mila desperately asks Kathy if Kioni can stay with them for a while, which she initially refuses. It was reported that Kioni's debut would lead to Mila's "huge" secret being revealed. It was then announced that EastEnders would be exploring the effects of Female genital mutilation (FGM) through Mila's character. In the storyline, a desperate Kathy demands to know why Mila is desperate to keep Kioni away from Nyangi, and although Mila struggles to get "the words out", she tells Kathy that the upcoming trip is not actually a holiday as Kioni is being taken away "to be cut". Kathy is horrified when she realises that Mila is referring to FGM, and Mila reveals that she underwent FGM herself and knows that Nyangi is planning to do the same to Kioni as Mila was told the same lie about going on holiday when she was a child herself. Kioni is unaware of her mother's true intentions and asks Mila to come on the trip with them. Mila becomes determined to protect Kioni, and is alarmed over her family's influence over her sister.

Bèllènéa was glad to tackle the storyline and wanted to portray the story through the eyes of women of young women who have been affected by it due to it being the "reality" of many people "living and walking by us every day". She stated, "I hope EastEnders have made a brave and needed step in reflecting our society and hopefully it encourages people to look out for each other, learn about each other and ask questions to bring awareness." Bèllènéa explained that Mila is scared that Kioni will go through what Mila had to go through and "still goes through till this day". The actress explained that Mila wants to protect Kioni from FGM in order to protect her innocence and let Kioni have "all the things" that Mila did not have. She added, "Mila is someone who doesn't want to see people unhappy or not living their full life, especially because she knows what that feels like to be trapped by something that is out of your control". Bèllènéa also believed that Mila feels that Kathy and Iqra sympathise but that they do not really understand her culture, explaining, "They haven't focused on the culture and why there’s such a strong belief, but more on the impact, and that children are being forced into a damaging procedure against their will".

"I immediately felt a weight of responsibility, but in the best possible way. I was so glad that a current topic that most people wouldn't want to handle – because of its fragility and cultural identity – was being brought to the forefront on such a massive platform. I was honoured to know I'd be able to give it the respect, care, and commitment to truth it deserved. I was ready for the challenge, though aware that I wanted to get it right."

— Bèllènéa on how she felt when she was told about the FGM storyline (2021)

Following Mila's reveal, Kathy allows Kioni to stay at her house and tells her grandson Bobby Beale (Clay Milner Russell) to keep an eye on her, but Nyangi comes to collect Kioni and Mila is "horrified" to have lost track of her sister, who is unaware of what their mother is planning, and is in a "race against time" to find her. Kathy wants to go to the police, but Mila begs her not to as it would result in Mila's adult family and members of their communities being sent to prison. Meanwhile, Iqra breaks up with Mila as she is unhappy with the way that she is being treated, having been shut out and wondering whether Mila actually cares about her, so Mila decides to open up to Iqra about what she went through as a child with FGM and how she still deals with the effects to this day and that she still experiences pain, nightmares and infections, despite her mum's claims that it is "over". Mila begs Iqra to help her stop her mother taking Kioni and Iqra, realising how much Mila has been through, promises to help Mila and Kioni. Mila is left in tears when Kioni tells her on the phone that the trip has been moved forward and Kathy demands that they need to go the police. Mila tells Kathy that her mum is not a bad person and begs Kathy to sort it out herself first, so Kathy says that she will call the police "with or without" Mila's approval after 24 hours if she does not manage to sort things out. Bèllènéa revealed that Mila is reluctant involve Kathy and Iqra due to their instant response being to call the police, adding that Mila "appreciates them allowing her a safe space to be vulnerable" but does not feel comfortable enough bringing them into "that world".

When Nyangi and Kioni return to the square, Mila tries to talk to talk to her mum but she shuts her daughter down, insisting that FGM is tradition. Kathy tries to talk to Nyangi and the situation becomes "heated" when Kathy snaps at her for what she is planning to do to Kioni. Mila then warns her mother that Kioni will be staying with her from now on and that she will call the police if Nyangi does not leave. Mila, hoping to change her mother's opinions on FGM, talks about her own beliefs on the subject and begs her mother to not allow the same thing that happened to her happen to Kioni, but this conversation is overheard by Kioni, who rushes off. As Iqra and Mila are searching for Kioni, Mila insists that her mother is not "evil" and can change and begs Iqra to not call the police, who is sceptical. Mila believes that she was finally to get through to her mother and is worried that Kioni will now think the worst of her. Kioni is told to come home by Kathy and she is "devastated" when she sees her mother being taken away by the police. Mila confronts Iqra for calling the police but Kathy insists that she was actually the one to phone them and Iqra lets Kathy take the blame. A social worker later visits Mila at Kathy's house to tell her that they found Kioni safe and the sisters briefly reunite, but Mila is then told that the social worker is trying to find a new place for Kioni to live in temporarily. Mila quickly volunteers to be Kioni's guardian but she is told that Kioni cannot currently stay with any of her family members for her own safety. Mila later tells Iqra that she is embarrassed that all the other residents now know what she had endured and also that she let it rip her family apart, but Iqra insists that she has nothing to feel bad about. Feeling "more guilty by the minute" for involving the police, Iqra makes a "life-changing" decision and invites Mila to move in with her so they can figure out how to get permanent custody of Mila.

Iqra later admits to Mila that she was the one who called the police on her mother, as she feels that the truth will come out in order for the pair to move on properly. Tom "Rocky" Cotton (Brian Conley) tries to reconcile the couple and gathers them together and steals their phones. The pair talk and Mila tells Iqra that she has taken steps to become Kioni's guardian, and Kathy tells Mila that Iqra decided to stay in Walford to help Mila rather seeing her sister Habiba Ahmed (Rukku Nahar) and her new nephew Tyrion. This revelations leads to Mila apologising to Iqra and the pair reunite and take the "next step" by agreeing to move in together. Months later, Mila is on "tenterhooks" as she is awaiting news of her mum's sentencing, and she and Kioni fall out as Kioni wants to go to the court but Mila decides not to. The sisters then find out that Nyangi has been sentenced to prison and whilst Iqra offers her support, an upset Kioni focuses on a fundraising event at the Prince Albert. Mila also stands up to Waseem Qureshi (Faraz M. Khan) when he complains about the gay bar being used for the fundraising and kicks him out after he makes a "clueless" comment that upsets Kioni. After Kioni tells Mila that she loves her, Mila tells her sister that she now has a new family. This makes Iqra feel guilty for having called the police but Mila assures her that she did the right thing.

=== Departure ===
In January 2022, it was announced that Bèllènéa would be departing the soap opera as Mila. This came weeks after announcement of Davdra's departure as Iqra, though it was not confirmed whether the exits were connected. It was also announced that Kamara would be departing as Kioni. It was reported that Mila and Kioni had been written out of the soap following the conclusion of the FGM storyline, with a source explaining, "Ruhtxjiaïh was brought into the soap last year to be part of a very important FGM storyline. Her character’s time has run its course so it's time for her to move on". Due to Mila being one of the several characters being written out, some news outlets reported that the soap opera cast were fearing a "mass axing", though EastEnders rejected this as "speculative nonsense". Mila and Kioni's exit storyline included Kioni revealing to Kathy that she will be departing Walford with Kioni to join Iqra in Bristol, after having gained custody of her with Iqra. The pair last appeared on the episode originally airing on 3 February 2022, which sees Kioni and Mila briefly attend the Albert Square LGBTQ+ party and Kathy encouraging them to celebrate with the residents before leaving Walford, with Mila joking that it is their "leaving party". Following the airing of the episode, Digital Spy confirmed that this was the pair's "low-key" exit. Offscreen, Kioni and Mila leave Walford to join Iqra in Bristol.

== Storylines ==
Mila competes against Kim Fox (Tameka Empson) for a barmaid job at the Prince Albert, Walford's gay bar. When Mila takes the blame for dropping a bottle on the floor, the bar's owner Kathy Beale (Gillian Taylforth) is impressed by her honesty and gives Mila the job. Kim later sets Mila up romantically with Iqra Ahmed (Priya Davdra) and the pair begin dating. Mila reluctantly agrees to be in a feature as a success story for Kim's matchmaking services, but she freaks out when the photographer takes a photo of her and leaves. Mila later confides in Iqra that she is worried about her homophobic family finding her, and that she changed her name from Robi to Mila to prevent them tracking her down. Mila later moves in with Kathy and her family when she is made homeless by her family. After the photographs of Mila and Iqra are posted online, Mila's mum Nyangi Marwa (Lucy Vandi) tracks Mila down and tries to set her up to marry a man. Kim accuses Mila of cheating when she sees her with the man but Mila tells Kim the truth. Nyangi tries to get Mila to come home but Kathy sticks up for Mila, telling Nyangi that Mila is gay and is staying here. Mila then kicks Nyangi out.

Mila's sister, Kioni Marwa (Florisa Kamara), arrives in Albert Square and whilst Mila is happy to be reunited with her, she is horrified when Kioni tells her that Nyangi is taking her on a special trip. Mila asks Kathy if Kioni can stay with them and hides her sister in the house when Kathy refuses. When Kathy finds out the truth, Mila tells Kathy that her mother is taking Kioni to have FGM and that she knows because it happened to her when she was younger, having been told the same deceptive lie. Kathy is shocked and allows Kioni to stay. Iqra breaks up with Mila after believing that she does not care about her but Mila tells her the truth and Iqra supports her. Mila begs Kathy and Iqra to not call the police as she does not believe that her mother is an evil person and does not want the adult members of her family and community being sent to prison. Mila stands up to Nyangi and tells her about her experience with AGM and how she still feels pain to this day. Nyangi is then arrested after Iqra calls the police, and Kathy takes the blame. Mila finds out the truth but forgives Iqra and they begin working to gain custody of Kioni. Mila and Kioni later find out that Nyangi has been sentenced to prison. Iqra leaves Walford to take a new job in Bristol and Mila leaves with Kioni to join her after being granted custody of her sister.

== Reception ==
For her role as Mila, Bèllènéa was nominated for "Best Soap Newcomer" at the I Talk Telly awards. Hannah Lovejoy from Digital Spy noted how Mila was enjoying her "fast-growing" relationship with Iqra, but called her concern for Kioni's trip "mysterious" as the FGM storyline had not been announced at that point. David Brown from Metro believed that Mila "took a sizeable step forward in life" by standing up to her mother's demands to marry a man and leave the square, and noted how the storyline saw Mila "come into the spotlight". He added, "Let's hope that this show of independence results in Mila embedding herself more into Walford life and brings her out from behind that bar more often..." Calli Kitson from the same news outlet believed that there was an "awful lot of mystery" around Mila prior to the reveal of the storyline. Kitson later called the scenes where Mila tells Kathy that she was genitally mutilated "emotional". Kitson's colleague, Stephen Patterson, called the scenes where Mila opens up to Iqra about her experience "devastating". Patterson noted how fans were left "horrified" and shocked by the Mila's revelation, but also reported how some fans had speculated that soap would tackle the topic of FGM through Marwa. He later referred to the storyline as "FGM horror" following Nyangi's sentencing.

Jaymi McCann from i reported how EastEnders was praised by fans for tackling the "difficult" FGM storyline on social media, adding how the soap had never "shied away" from portraying difficult but important subjects. McCan also called the storyline "hard hitting" and sensitive. Sarah Ellis from Inside Soap called the storyline "important and eye-opening" and wrote that viewers were "left horrified" when Mila admitted that she had been a victim of FGM. Angie Quinn from MyLondon reported how fans were "horrified" and shocked by Mila's "horrifying revelation" but also were praising the soap for tackling the storyline. Quinn also called the storyline "dark". Megan Davies from Digital Spy believed that Mila was brave when she spoke to her mother about her beliefs about FGM. Her colleague, Justin Harp, called the scenes where Kioni opens up about her FGM abuse and tries to protect Kioni "heartbreaking". Harp later called Mila and Kioni's exit "low-key" and noted that whilst Mila, Kioni and Iqra had featured "prominently" during the FGM storyline, they had "faded into the background" in the months before their exits due to other characters taking more focus. Harp's colleague Sophie Dainty called the news of Mila and Kioni's departure "somewhat unsurprising" and noted that it was "Hot on the heels" of Iqra's exit. Dainty also called the FGM storyline "powerful".

Sara-Aisha Kent from the Daily Mirror wrote that Mila "had her fair share of dramatic storylines" despite only being in the soap opera for little over a year. James Rodger from the Birmingham Mail called Mila a "fan favourite". Grace Morris from What to Watch reported how fans were "furious" and "less than impressed" by Kioni and Mila's "rushed", disappointing and "very underwhelming" exit, which she compared to Iqra's departure. Norris wrote how some fans were confused as to whether the pair had left due to their "rather disappointing" departure scenes, and noted how unhappy fans had fans expressed on social media that the sisters had an "unimpressive" and could have been developed more. However, Morris also wrote that Mila winning custody of Kioni was "happy news".
