= List of EastEnders characters introduced in 2021 =

EastEnders logo

EastEnders is a BBC soap opera that first aired on 19 February 1985. The following is a list of characters that first appeared in 2021, in order of first appearance. All characters are introduced by the show's executive producer, Jon Sen. The first character to be introduced in 2021 is Caleb Malone (Ben Freeman), who joined as part of a storyline involving Chelsea Fox (Zaraah Abrahams) and Lucas Johnson (Don Gilet). Zack Hudson (James Farrar) made his debut in March, followed by Dana Monroe (Barbara Smith) and Estelle Jones (Sue Holderness) in April. Vi Highway (Gwen Taylor) was then introduced in May. Tom "Rocky" Cotton (Brian Conley) made his first appearance in May pretending to be Terry Cant, the father of Sonia Fowler (Natalie Cassidy). Dani Dyer guest-starred as Jeanette in June and Harvey Monroe (Ross Boatman) made his debut in July. Kate Robbins was then cast in the guest role of music agent Jen Glover, making her first appearance in August. In October, Delroy Atkinson, Charlie Wernham and Heather Peace made their debuts as Howie Danes, Aaron Monroe and Eve Unwin, respectively, as well as Alyssa, the child of Jada Lennox (Kelsey Calladine-Smith) and Dennis Rickman Jnr (Bleu Landau). Additionally, multiple other characters appear throughout the year.

== Caleb Malone ==
Caleb Malone
- EastEnders character
- Portrayed by: Ben Freeman
- First appearance: Episode 6209; 25 January 2021
- Last appearance: Episode 6238; 16 March 2021
- Introduced by: Jon Sen

Caleb Malone, played by Ben Freeman, first appears in episode 6209, originally broadcast on 25 January 2021. The character and Freeman's casting details were announced on 12 January 2021. Caleb is introduced as part of a story with Chelsea Fox (Zaraah Abrahams) and her father, Lucas Johnson (Don Gilet), although details regarding the story were embargoed. Rianne Houghton from Digital Spy suggested that Caleb could be involved in Chelsea's plot against her father. Freeman was contracted for multiple episodes, appearing in a small stint. A Heart reporter called Caleb "a very mysterious new character". The character departs in episode 6238, originally broadcast on 16 March 2021.

Caleb arrives in Walford to meet Chelsea, having spoken previously on the phone about a "job" in which Cheslea is using Lucas as a "courier". Caleb comments to Chelsea that her clothes appear expensive so she clearly knows how to spend the money she took from him. She insists he will get it back and he says to make sure nothing goes wrong, making a veiled threat towards her.

== Stan "Stas" Saunders ==
Stan "Stas" Saunders
- EastEnders character
- Portrayed by: Adam Young
- First appearance: Episode 6225; 22 February 2021
- Last appearance: Episode 6280; 28 May 2021
- Introduced by: Jon Sen

Stan "Stas" Saunders, played by Adam Young, is an associate of Phil (Steve McFadden) and Ben Mitchell (Max Bowden), who first appeared in Episode 6225, which originally aired 22 February 2021. He comes to the Mitchell's to launder money but also speaks to Kheerat Panesar (Jaz Deol), who offers to do it cheaper and faster. However, Phil's girlfriend, Kat Slater (Jessie Wallace), tells him that Stas met Kheerat so Phil is able to secure the business with Stas by revealing that his meeting was leaked. Kat sees Stas and later, Stas does not go to his meeting with Ben, revealing that he dislikes the Mitchells' nickname for him, "Shell Suit Stan", which he heard from Kat, who was upset by something Phil said about her. Phil tells Ben to let Kheerat have the deal with Stas because he will mess it up. Stas increases the amount of money to be laundered from £50,000 a week to £100,000 and Kheerat agrees. Kheerat allows Ben to work with him and Stas because the Panesar name is not well known but the Mitchells are. Stas says he cannot trust Ben because of his relationship with a police officer, Callum Highway (Tony Clay) and asks Ben if he and Phil have called him "mad" behind his back, threatening to shoot someone if he does not tell the truth. Ben admits that they have, so Stas then says because he cannot trust Ben, he now cannot trust Kheerat and the deal is off, demanding his money back or he will shoot someone. Kheerat calls his brother, Vinny Panesar (Shiv Jalota) to bring the cash but Vinny is confronted by a thief. With Callum's help, Vinny escapes the thief. Stas threatens to shoot someone when Vinny arrives, giving Stas his cash. Stas agrees to keep to the deal but confirms to Ben that Kat told him about the Mitchells' "mad" comments about him. Later, Kheerat decides to give Vinny a job to look after one of Stas's associates. Vinny agrees to drive the man and sees he has gold bars in a bag in the boot of the car. Vinny then sees the man has died suddenly so he calls Callum and shows him the gold. Callum contacts Ben, who delivers the gold to Stas. When Ben returns, he says Stas thinks the man stole some of the gold and it will not be found and he congratulates Vinny on his good job. Vinny then reveals to his family that he stole the gold. Kheerat's mother, Suki Panesar (Balvinder Sopal), later agrees to launder money for Stas but Kheerat says it is too much and turns him down. He made his final appearance in Episode 6280, which originally aired on 28 May 2021.

== Zack Hudson ==
Zack Hudson, played by James Farrar, first appears in episode 6237, originally broadcast on 16 March 2021. The character and Farrar's casting details were announced on 31 January 2021. Zack is introduced as the son of Gavin Sullivan (Paul Nicholas) and half-brother of established character Sharon Watts (Letitia Dean), although this is embargoed until his first appearance. The character is billed as a "unpredictable troublemaker who lives life in the fast lane". He is described as "forever the ladies' man" and Jon Sen, the show's executive producer, called him a "charming rogue". Farrar noted that Zack becomes a "heartthrob" who causes tension with the Carter family. The character's backstory states that he experienced a challenging childhood which gave him attachment issues and turned him into a "lone wolf". Farrar expressed his delight at joining EastEnders and hoped to bring his experience as "a born and bred Londoner" to the role. He liked Zack's backstory and commented, "there is a real depth to him that I can't wait to explore." He found the role of Zack different to other roles he has portrayed. Sen dubbed Farrar "a wonderful addition" and teased that "trouble is always just round the corner" for Zack.

== Dana Monroe ==
Dana Monroe (initially credited as Dana Adams), played by Barbara Smith, first appears in episode 6247, originally broadcast on 1 April 2021. She is introduced as a love interest for Bobby Beale (Clay Milner Russell), who meets her under a false alias. Smith previously appeared on EastEnders in 2019 as Ellie. Smith auditioned for the role of Dana over Zoom due to the impact of the COVID-19 pandemic on television and despite thinking that she had not performed well, Smith was cast as Dana. She was initially cast in a 6-month guest stint, but was promoted to a regular cast member and had her family introduced to the soap. Dana has been shown to be a bubbly and likeable character and critics have noted that it has been refreshing to have a character with good intentions on EastEnders.

As well as her on-off relationship with Bobby, her tumultuous relationships with her relatives have been central to Dana's storylines. Father Harvey Monroe (Ross Boatman) is shown to be a strict father to Dana and attempts to control her, while brother Aaron Monroe (Charlie Wernham) disgusts Dana with his racist and Islamophobic attitudes. Smith noted that despite Dana being at the bottom of the Monroe family's power hierarchy, it would not stop her from attempting to change their family's old-fashioned mindsets. Smith's departure was announced in June 2022, having been written out by new executive producer Chris Clenshaw. Dana made her departure in episode 6549, originally broadcast on 1 September 2022. The character's relationship with Bobby has been well received by viewers and critics, with one of their scenes nominated for Feel Good Moment at the 2021 Inside Soap Awards. Smith was also nominated in the newcomer categories at the 2021 I Talk Telly Awards and the Digital Spy Reader Awards for her portrayal of Dana.

== Molly Ellis ==
Molly Ellis
- EastEnders character
- Portrayed by: Juliette Alexandra
- Duration: 2021–2022
- First appearance: Episode 6250; 6 April 2021
- Last appearance: Episode 6470; 18 April 2022
- Introduced by: Jon Sen

Molly Ellis, played by Juliette Alexandra, is the owner of a dog that Bailey Baker (Kara-Leah Fernandes) and Bernadette Taylor (Clair Norris) have been taking care of. She first appears in Episode 6250, which originally aired 6 April 2021.

After retrieving her dog, Molly asks Bernadette on a date and the two of them strike up a friendship over the coming months and even become co-workers at KJP Pest Control. However, she learns that Bernadette has plans to be a surrogate mother for Rainie (Tanya Franks) and Stuart Highway (Ricky Champ), which Molly vocalises her disagreement with. Bernadette explains that their payment is to benefit her family, who come first for her, and she tells Molly that they are done. Molly made her last appearance in Episode 6470, which originally aired on 18 April 2022, however she was mentioned once more on 18 August 2022 when Bernie mentioned going out clubbing with her and some others for her 20th birthday.

== Estelle Jones ==
Estelle Jones
- EastEnders character
- Portrayed by: Sue Holderness
- First appearance: Episode 6261; 26 April 2021
- Last appearance: Episode 6264; 30 April 2021
- Introduced by: Jon Sen
In-universe information
- Occupation: Theatrical agent

Estelle Jones, played by Sue Holderness, first appears in episode 6261, originally broadcast on 26 April 2021. The character and Holderness' casting details were announced on 26 March 2021. Holderness was contracted for a guest stint and appears in four episodes. The actress expressed her delight at her casting and found filming on the EastEnders set a "surreal" experience. EastEnders marks Holderness' first time filming a soap. Estelle is introduced as a love interest for Billy Mitchell (Perry Fenwick). Holderness described her character as "a good time girl" who adopts a carefree attitude to money and enjoys "fine dining". The character is a theatrical agent who works with children. She arrives for a photoshoot with Billy's daughter, Janet Mitchell (Grace). Estelle meets Billy and becomes "very intrigued" by him. Holderness did not think that Estelle and Billy were well suited, but felt Billy needed "some fun in his life". Estelle departs in episode 6264, originally broadcast on 30 April 2021. Holderness expressed an interest in reprising the role again.

Estelle is theatrical agent who Billy meets at when dropping his daughter Janet off for a photoshoot. They go on a date and Estelle asks Janet's mother and Billy's ex-wife, Honey Mitchell (Emma Barton), if she is okay with them dating. Honey approves but is upset to learn that Estelle is paying Janet less than the other children, believing it to be because Janet has Down syndrome. Estelle states that this isn't the case and that she is paid less because of her inexperience. Estelle goes on another date with Billy and Honey appears, refusing to take Janet to any more photoshoots.

== Nyangi Marwa ==
Nyangi Marwa
- EastEnders character
- Portrayed by: Lucy Vandi
- First appearance: Episode 6264; 30 April 2021
- Last appearance: Episode 62; 1 June 2021
- Introduced by: Jon Sen
In-universe information
- Daughters: Mila Marwa; Kioni Marwa

Nyangi Marwa, played by Lucy Vandi, is the mother of Mila Marwa (Ruhtxjiaïh Bèllènéa), who first appeared in Episode 6264, which first aired on 30 April 2021. She finds Mila in Walford and tries to persuade her to marry a man named Joseph. However, Kathy Beale (Gillian Taylforth), who Mila is living with, affirms that Mila is gay and that the marriage would not be good for her. Nyangi continues to tell Mila that she will marry Joseph until Mila states that she has done enough for their family.

Mila learns that Nyangi plans to take her sister Kioni Marwa (Florisa Kamara) away on a supposed holiday. Mila recalls to when her mother told her the same story when she was Kioni's age and realises that Nyangi is having Kioni undergo female genital mutilation. Kathy calls the police on her and Nyangi is subsequently arrested. Nyangi made her last appearance in Episode 6282, which aired on 1 June 2021 and is sentenced to imprisonment in December 2021. Mila and her girlfriend Iqra Ahmed (Priya Davdra) gain custody of Kioni and the three of them subsequently move to Bristol in February 2022.

== Vi Highway ==
Vi Highway
- EastEnders character
- Portrayed by: Gwen Taylor
- Duration: 2021–2023
- First appearance: Episode 6265; 3 May 2021
- Last appearance: Episode 6660; 9 March 2023
- Introduced by: Jon Sen
In-universe information
- Husband: Freddie Highway
- Sons: Jonno Highway; Christopher
- Grandsons: Stuart Highway; Callum Highway
- Other relatives: Zara Highway; Roland Highway

Violet "Vi" Highway, played by Gwen Taylor, first appears in episode 6265, originally broadcast on 3 May 2021. The character and Taylor's casting details were announced on 17 March 2021. Vi is billed as the "quick-witted and blunt" grandmother of established characters Callum Highway (Tony Clay) and Stuart Highway (Ricky Champ). She is described as a "steely" and dependable woman with a "very warm heart" deep down. Taylor characterised Vi as "sharp but honest" and said that she places importance on her family. Johnathon Hughes from the Radio Times dubbed Vi a "plucky pensioner" who is "no-nonsense, takes no prisoners and has absolutely no filter".

When developing the character, Taylor took inspiration from her own mother who would regularly share her opinions. Hughes felt that Vi could fill the void of the "cockney matriarch" missing from the show. Taylor liked the idea of developing Vi into this character and hoped writers would explore this. Taylor first auditioned for EastEnders in 1984 for one of the show's original characters, but was rejected due to not being from the area. Jon Sen, the show's executive producer, was pleased with Taylor's casting, calling her "the perfect actress to play the multi-faceted Violet Highway".

The character is introduced in the build up to Callum's wedding to Ben Mitchell (Max Bowden). She arrives after Ben informs her about the wedding and when she meets him, Vi warns Ben that Callum was a good person until he met Ben. Vi then arranges a chat with Ben's father, Phil Mitchell (Steve McFadden); Taylor explained that Vi is not in "fighting mode" when she meets Phil, which meant he did not need to fear her. The actress enjoyed working with McFadden, who helped her adjust to the filming schedule. Sen teased that Vi is "a grandmother not to be messed with", which he said Callum and Stuart would quickly learn. On Vi's relationship with her grandchildren, Taylor commented, "She loves those boys and is incredibly protective of them." In her backstory, Vi spent a lot of time caring for Stuart as a child, but did not do the same with Callum. As a result, she favours Stuart.

Discussing future storylines for her character, Taylor told Hughes that Vi has a secret, which would explain how her life has panned out. She wanted the character to be well-embedded in the show before the secret was explored. The secret was revealed in November 2021 when it emerges Vi has another son, Christopher, who she gave away because she feared she couldn't provide enough support as he has Down syndrome.

== Tom "Rocky" Cotton ==
Tom "Rocky" Cotton, played by Brian Conley, first appears in episode 6274, originally broadcast on 18 May 2021. The character and Conley's casting details were announced on 15 February 2021. The character is introduced as Terry Cant, the father of established character Sonia Fowler (Natalie Cassidy). Whilst the concept of Terry Cant had been referenced since Sonia's introduction, it received more focus in June 2020 when Sonia decides to search for him. The character is billed as the "ultimate people pleaser" and a charmer. His arrival creates "a huge shock" for Sonia, who had given up looking for her father. Conley expressed his delight at joining the cast, calling it "an incredible moment for me". His father was a big fan of EastEnders, so the actor was proud to be a part of the show. Jon Sen, the show's executive producer, thought Conley was the perfect casting for Terry Cant and called him "a talented performer whose charm, wit and charisma are exactly the qualities we want for Terry".

On 12 September 2023, it was confirmed that Conley had quit the show, and his last appearance aired on 29 December 2023 which saw Rocky in police custody admitting to the fire at the cafe after an emotional goodbye to Kathy.

== Kioni Marwa ==
Kioni Marwa
- EastEnders character
- Portrayed by: Florisa Kamara
- Duration: 2021–2022
- First appearance: Episode 6277; 24 May 2021
- Last appearance: Episode 6428; 3 February 2022
- Introduced by: Jon Sen
In-universe information
- Mother: Nyangi Marwa
- Sisters: Mila Marwa

Kioni Marwa, played by Florisa Kamara, is the sister of Mila Marwa (Ruhtxjiaïh Bèllènéa). She first appears in Episode 6277, which first aired on 24 May 2021, when she informs Mila that their mother Nyangi Marwa (Lucy Vandi) plans to take her on a trip to see an unnamed aunt.

Mila later reveals that Nyangi is planning to have her taken to be genitally mutilated, as she was when she was younger. Mila's girlfriend, Iqra Ahmed (Priya Davdra), gets Nyangi sent to prison and Mila is given custody of Kioni. The three of them then move to Bristol. Kioni last appeared in Episode 6428, which originally aired on 3 February 2022.

== Jeanette ==
Jeanette
- EastEnders character
- Portrayed by: Dani Dyer
- Appears in: Episode 6289; 15 June 2021
- Introduced by: Jon Sen
In-universe information
- Occupation: Taxi driver
- Sons: Michael

Jeanette, played by Dani Dyer, appears in episode 6289, originally broadcast on 15 June 2021. The character and Dyer's casting details were announced on 5 May 2021. Jeanette is introduced as a pregnant taxicab driver who drives Mick Carter, portrayed by her real-life father Danny Dyer, to his wife's baby scan appointment. Dyer was contracted for a cameo appearance in one episode. She enjoyed filming with her father and admitted that he would try making her laugh during filming. For the role of Jeanette, Dyer had to learn how to drive a taxi. She admitted to not being a confident driver, so she did test runs before filming. While taxiing Mick, Jeanette's waters break and he has to help her give birth. Dyer initially researched how to act pregnant, before deciding to use her own experiences when portraying the character. She also had to wear a fake baby bump, which she enjoyed.

Jeanette is flagged down by Mick after his car suffers a flat tyre in his attempts to get to the hospital where his wife Linda Carter (Kellie Bright) is having a baby scan. Jeanette is heavily pregnant herself, and when they stop for her to use the loo, her waters break. She panics as her partner is away, but Mick takes charge of the situation and drives her to the hospital. Once there, she pleads with Mick not to leave her, calling him her guardian angel (something which Mick called her when they first met), and Mick accompanies her as she has the baby. She gives birth to a boy, who she names Michael.

== Harvey Monroe ==
Harvey Monroe, played by Ross Boatman, first appears in episode 6311, originally broadcast on 22 July 2021. The character and Boatman's casting details were announced on 9 June 2021. Harvey is introduced as the father of newcomer Dana Monroe (Barbara Smith), who is in a relationship with Bobby Beale (Clay Milner Russell). He is billed as "traditional and a real family man". Boatman described him as "an old-school East Ender with traditional values". Harvey is a taxi driver. The character's backstory states that he was brought up in Bow, London and has raised Dana on his own. Subsequently, they have a close relationship.

== Jen Glover ==
Jen Glover, played by Kate Robbins, first appears in episode 6319, originally broadcast on 5 August 2021. The character and Robbins' casting details were announced on 11 July 2021. Jen is introduced as the music agent friend of Terry "Rocky" Cant (Brian Conley). She is billed as "no-nonsense" and an "old-school rocker". Jen arrives to work with singer Whitney Dean (Shona McGarty) on the recommendation of Rocky and becomes "determined" to make Whitney famous. Robbins was contracted to the soap for a guest role. The actress expressed her joy at appearing in EastEnders and called it "a dream".

== Annie Carter ==
Annie Carter
- EastEnders character
- Portrayed by: Uncredited (2021–2022, 2023–2025); Savannah Keir (2022–2023); Lois Hawkins (2025–present)
- Duration: 2021–present
- First appearance: Episode 6342; 13 September 2021
- Introduced by: Jon Sen
In-universe information
- Family: Branning/Carter
- Father: Max Branning
- Mother: Linda Carter
- Stepfather: Mick Carter
- Stepmother: Cindy Beale
- Half-brothers: Bradley Branning; Oscar Branning; Lee Carter; Johnny Carter; Ollie Carter
- Half-sisters: Lauren Branning; Abi Branning; Nancy Carter
- Grandfathers: Jim Branning
- Grandmothers: Elaine Peacock; Reenie Branning
- Uncles: Derek Branning; Jack Branning
- Aunts: Carol Jackson; Suzy Branning; April Branning
- Nephews: Louie Beale; Jimmy Beale; Michael Carter
- Nieces: AJ Branning
- First cousins: Bianca Jackson; Sonia Fowler; Robbie Jackson; Billie Jackson; Joey Branning; Alice Branning; Penny Branning; Amy Mitchell; Ricky Branning; James Branning
- Other relatives: Liam Butcher; Tiffany Butcher; Morgan Butcher; Bex Fowler; Julia Fowler; Sami Jackson; Charli Slater; Ethan Branning-Panesar

Annie Carter is the daughter of established characters Max Branning (Jake Wood) and Linda Carter (Kellie Bright) born in episode 6342, first broadcast on 13 September 2021. Annie is a result of a short-term affair between her parents, which is a major factor in her mother's declining marriage to Mick Carter (Danny Dyer), in addition to Linda's alcoholism. Annie is later raised in Sharon Watts's (Letitia Dean) home; Sharon is Linda's best friend, who lets Linda stay with her following the breakdown of her marriage, under the condition that she stay sober. Linda mostly manages this, and is falsely reported to social services by Jada Lennox (Kelsey Calladine-Smith) after being blackmailed into it by Janine Butcher (Charlie Brooks), in a desperate attempt to keep Mick away from Linda.

Mick disappears on Christmas Day 2022, following an attempt to save Linda after she is driven off a cliff by Janine, and is presumed dead. Linda takes back control of The Queen Vic, struggling with grief over Mick, but continues to hang on for her youngest children, Annie and Ollie Carter (Harry Farr). They are later joined by their maternal grandmother, Elaine Peacock (now Harriet Thorpe), her fiancé, George Knight (Colin Salmon), and his two daughters Gina (Francesca Henry) and Anna (Molly Rainford). In January 2024, Annie's half-sister Lauren Branning (Jacqueline Jossa) returns to Walford alongside Lauren's son Louie Beale (Jake McNally) and cousin Penny Branning (Kitty Castledine). Lauren does not know of Annie's existence until a brief conversation with another cousin, Sonia Fowler (Natalie Cassidy), in a bid to stop her from departing Walford again. Lauren storms into The Queen Vic and demands to meet Annie. Linda later allows Lauren to meet Annie, and they soon bond as Lauren is still struggling with the death their sister Abi Branning (Lorna Fitzgerald).

== Howie Danes ==
Howie Danes
- EastEnders character
- Portrayed by: Delroy Atkinson
- Duration: 2021–present
- First appearance: Episode 6357; 11 October 2021
- Introduced by: Jon Sen
- Spin-off appearances: Kimfluencer (2022)
In-universe information
- Other names: Howie Fox-Danes; Vince Hubbard (false name)
- Occupation: Security guard Party entertainer Postman
- Wife: Kim Fox (2026–present)
- Sons: Denzel Danes
- Stepsons: Mica Fox
- Stepdaughters: Pearl Fox

Howie Danes (also Fox-Danes) portrayed by Delroy Atkinson, first appears in episode 6357, originally broadcast on 11 October 2021. The character was first publicised in advanced spoilers released on 4 October 2021, where he was named Vince Hubbard. Howie is introduced as part of a story exploring the disappearance of established character Vincent Hubbard (Richard Blackwood) as his wife, Kim Fox (Tameka Empson), searches for him. The character is a children's entertainer and had been using Vincent's identity. Atkinson described his character as vulnerable, which he thought was "refreshing".

Writers then integrated Howie into the Fox-Trueman family unit by developing a romance between him and Kim. Atkinson was pleased to be involved in the group and liked working with Empson, Diane Parish (Denise Fox) and Scott Maslen (Jack Branning). Howie's son, Denzel Danes (Jaden Ladega), was introduced in August 2022. Atkinson thought it would be interesting to see how Howie responds to being a parent and could offer a deeper exploration of the character. For his portrayal of Howie, Atkinson was nominated for Best Newcomer at the 2022 Inside Soap Awards.

Kim overhears Mitch Baker (Roger Griffiths) cab booking for someone using the name "Vince Hubbard" and decides to investigate it as she believes it is her husband, Vincent. She traces the booking to Walford East restaurant, where she finds children's entertainer Howie. He reveals that he was a security guard at a junkyard and found Vincent's wallet. Kim learns that Vincent is dead and pleads with Howie to accompany her to report his death to the police. Phil Mitchell (Steve McFadden) realises their plan and scares Howie away, leaving Kim devastated. Kim later visits the junkyard to seek answers and spots Howie, who explains that Phil threatened him. At Christmas, Howie visits Kim with presents for her children and agrees to join Kim in reporting Vincent's death.

He then returns to help Kim film a scholarship video for her daughter, Pearl Fox (Arayah Harris-Buckle). Howie decides to change the video without Kim's permission and she orders him to leave. She comes around when Pearl gets the scholarship. Kim assumes that Howie is gay and does not realise that he has feelings for her; she sets up him on a date with another man until Howie confesses his feelings. Kim is initially not keen on a relationship with Howie and he leaves. However, when Howie injures his leg, Kim decides to help him and invites Howie to move in with her at 20 Albert Square. Howie struggles with Kim's eagerness to help and decides to move back home to Walford Towers after recovering. Kim drops a bag on his leg resulting in him staying longer. Howie pursues a relationship with Kim once again and they start dating.

Howie starts receiving phone calls from an unknown person and he tells the caller that he loves them. He meets with a woman, Delilah (Chereen Buckley), who is revealed to be his ex-girlfriend and mother to his son, Denzel. She leaves Denzel to stay with Howie and Kim and they struggle to bond together. Denzel causes trouble and when Amy Mitchell (Ellie Dadd) collapses after taking drugs, Denzel is accused of providing her with the drugs until Lily Slater (Lillia Turner) admits the truth.

== Aaron Monroe ==
Aaron Monroe, played by Charlie Wernham, first appears in episode 6363, originally broadcast on 21 October 2021. The character and Wernham's casting details were announced on 9 August 2021. Aaron is introduced as the eldest son of Harvey Monroe (Ross Boatman) and brother of Dana Monroe (Barbara Smith). The character's introduction establishes the family as a new unit in the show, with connections to the Beale family through Dana's relationship with Bobby Beale (Clay Milner Russell). The character is billed as "a confident and fiercely loyal individual". He is described as a "wayward son". Aaron's backstory states that he was raised by Harvey, who he shares a close relationship with, and left home as soon as he got a job in finance in inner-city London. Wernham expressed his happiness at being cast and called joining the soap "a childhood dream". Jon Sen, the show's executive producer, was pleased with Wernham's casting and teased that there is "more to Aaron than his bravado lets on".

== Eve Panesar-Unwin ==
Eve Panesar-Unwin
- EastEnders character
- Portrayed by: Heather Peace
- Duration: 2021–present
- First appearance: Episode 6369; 29 October 2021
- Introduced by: Jon Sen
In-universe information
- Other names: Eve Panesar-Unwin
- Occupation: Lawyer; Market trader
- Mother: Norma Unwin
- Sisters: Erica Unwin
- Wife: Stacey Slater (2021–2024); Suki Panesar (2025–present)
- Adoptive daughters: Ria Virdi (foster)
- Stepsons: Arthur Fowler; Kheerat Panesar; Jags Panesar; Vinny Panesar
- Stepdaughters: Lily Slater; Hope Fowler; Ash Panesar

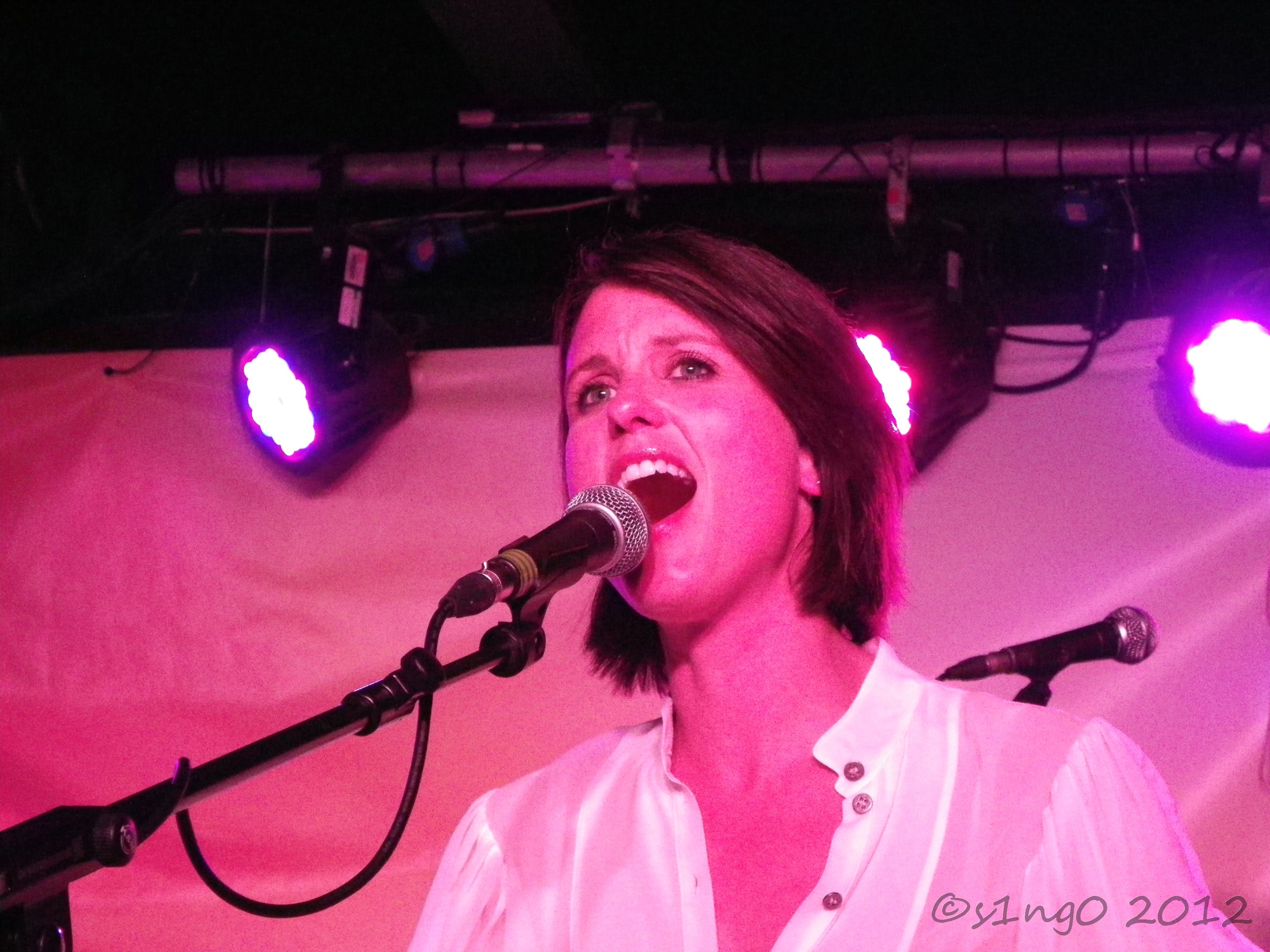
Heather Peace has portrayed Eve Unwin since 2021.

Eve Unwin (also Panesar-Unwin), played by Heather Peace, first appears in episode 6369, originally broadcast on 29 October 2021. The character and Peace's casting details were announced on 29 August 2021. Eve is introduced as the cellmate and wife of established character Stacey Slater (Lacey Turner), who recently returned to the show, following her third maternity leave. The character is billed as "tough-as-nails" and Peace described her character as "tough, but fair; super bright and cheeky". She dubbed her a "loveable and quick-witted" woman with a short temper. The actress thought that any of Eve's illegal and immoral behaviour is often justified and understandable. Turner called Eve "hot-headed". The character, like Peace, is a member of the LGBT community. The actress was proud to create representation of the community on the soap. Peace expressed her delight at joining the cast and enjoyed working opposite Turner. On Peace's casting as Eve, executive producer Jon Sen commented: "Heather brings the perfect amount of boldness and wit to the role". Eve was credited as Eve Unwin from 2021-2024 and Eve Panesar-Unwin from 2025 onwards after marrying Suki

The character's backstory states that she was imprisoned for a short sentence but it was repeatedly extended after committing crimes in prison. She then met Stacey in prison and they became friends, marrying for convenience to secure a permanent residence for Eve. Sen explained that Eve and Stacey share a "very unique friendship", stemming from their shared prison experience. Turner told Sophie Dainty from Digital Spy that Eve and Stacey have "a great chemistry", reflected in her working relationship with Peace. The friendship between Eve and Stacey was tested by Stacey's mother, Jean Slater (Gillian Wright). Kate Oates, the show's senior executive producer, explained that Jean thinks Eve will create trouble for Stacey. She teased that Jean may go to "extreme" lengths to protect Stacey from Eve.

== Alyssa Lennox ==
Alyssa Lennox
- EastEnders character
- Portrayed by: Uncredited
- Duration: 2021–2022
- First appearance: Episode 6368; 29 October 2021
- Last appearance: Episode 6614/5; 25 December 2022
- Introduced by: Jon Sen
In-universe information
- Family: Watts
- Father: Dennis Rickman Jnr
- Mother: Jada Lennox
- Grandfathers: Dennis Rickman; Phil Mitchell (adoptive)
- Grandmothers: Sharon Watts
- Uncles: Albie Watts; Ben Mitchell (adoptive)
- First cousins: Lexi Pearce (adoptive)
- Other relatives: Zack Hudson; Dolly Dean-Hudson

Alyssa Lennox is the baby daughter of Dennis Rickman Jnr (Bleu Landau) and Jada Lennox (Kelsey Calladine-Smith), who first appears in Episode 6368 on 29 October 2021, when she is left on Zack Hudson (James Farrar) and Sharon Watts' (Letitia Dean) doorstep. They initially believe her father to be Zack. Martin Fowler (James Bye) also suspects that he is the father of Alyssa; to clear up their beliefs, they both participate in a paternity test. The test results conclude that neither of them are the father of Alyssa, however, when mother Jada was first seen, it was revealed that it was Sharon's son Dennis who was the father.

Alyssa was born on 22 August 2020 and was conceived when her parents were only 13 and 14 years old. When Dennis drowned in a boat accident, Jada was three months pregnant, meaning she never got the chance to tell him about the pregnancy. When Jada revealed that Dennis was the father of Alyssa, Sharon did a DNA test, which proved she was telling the truth. After a while, Sharon tried to go for full custody of Alyssa, with the help of her ex-husband Phil Mitchell (Steve McFadden), however when Zack tells Jada about this, her convinces her to move in with him, Sharon, her son Albie (Arthur Gentleman) and Martin. When Linda Carter (Kellie Bright) moves into the Watts' household, Jada, Martin and Zack are against this due to her being a recovering alcoholic and having Alyssa, Albie and Linda's daughter Annie Carter living there. Jada ends up being blackmailed by Janine Butcher (Charlie Brooks) into planting empty bottles around the house and calls social services. The guilt causes her to move to live with her aunt, taking Alyssa with her. However, Alyssa returns on Christmas Day when Jada returns to tell Sharon the truth about the blackmail. In 2025, following Martin's funeral, Sharon leaves Walford in order to stay with Alyssa and Jada.

== Jada Lennox ==
Jada Lennox
- EastEnders character
- Portrayed by: Kelsey Calladine-Smith
- Duration: 2021–2022
- First appearance: Episode 6373; 8 November 2021
- Last appearance: Episode 6614/6615; 25 December 2022
- Introduced by: Jon Sen (2021); Chris Clenshaw (2022)
In-universe information
- Occupation: Hairdresser
- Father: Sonny
- Daughters: Alyssa Lennox

Jada Lennox, played by Kelsey Calladine-Smith, first appears on episode 6373, originally broadcast on 8 November 2021. The character and Calladine-Smith's casting was first publicised in advanced spoilers released on 2 November 2021. Jada is introduced as the mother of 1-year-old Alyssa, who was left on the doorstep of 29 Albert Square in earlier episodes. This sparked a new story as Zack Hudson (James Farrar) and Martin Fowler (James Bye) were considered as possible fathers. The character's arrival reveals the truth: established character Sharon Watts (Letitia Dean), Zack's half-sister, is the grandmother of Alyssa, via her deceased son Dennis Rickman (Bleu Landau).

On 10 June 2022, the character's departure was announced, having been written out alongside three other characters by new executive producer Chris Clenshaw. A show insider explained that the decision was part of "a creative decision" from Clenshaw, who wanted to "take the show back to its roots". Calladine-Smith reflected on her tenure in a social media post, commenting, "My EastEnders experience has brought me nothing but smiles". The character departs after being blackmailed by Janine Butcher (Charlie Brooks) into framing Linda Carter (Kellie Bright) and having her daughter, Annie Carter, removed from her care. Jada exits in episode 6548, originally broadcast on 31 August 2022. Calladine-Smith's return was confirmed on 13 December 2022; Jada returns during the show's Christmas episodes as part of the conclusion to Janine's story. Brooks explained that Jada's return would cause "shock and fear" for Janine. The character appears in episode 6614/6615, originally broadcast on 25 December 2022.

Jada first appears whilst watching Alyssa from a distance. When Alyssa drops her teddy, Jada keeps it and tries to leave it on Sharon's doorstep. Zack notices her and when she tries to run, she is chased by Zack and Sharon. Jada reveals that she is Alyssa's mother and that Sharon's deceased son, Dennis, is Alyssa's father, but Sharon accuses Jada of lying. When Jada reveals intimate details of Dennis' life, including Sharon's affair with Keanu Taylor (Danny Walters), she comes around and takes Jada in. Sharon later gets a DNA test which proves that Alyssa is Dennis' daughter. Dennis' adoptive father Phil Mitchell (Steve McFadden) believes that Jada is struggling to look after Alyssa and convinces Sharon to go for full custody. Zack overhears their plan and tells Jada, who flees with Alyssa.

Months later, Zack meets her to return Alyssa's toy after seeing them in Bethnal Green. He persuades her to return to Walford, and whilst outside the train station, Jada is inattentive to Alyssa, causing her pram to roll into the path of an oncoming car. Sharon saves her and asks Jada and Alyssa to move in with her, promising to let Jada keep Alyssa. Jada starts working for Denise Fox (Diane Parish) at her salon, Fox & Hair. She befriends Will Mitchell (Freddie Phillips) and bumps into her old friends Chess Newland (Liani Samuel) and Melody Wiles (Niamh Longford). When Sharon decides to go on holiday with her infant son Albie Watts, Chess and Melody plan a party at Sharon's house without Jada's permission. Jada persuades Zack and Martin to leave the house, however, Sonia Fowler (Natalie Cassidy) overhears the music and ends the party after catching Will smoking. Zack and Martin decide to tell Sharon but change their mind. Jada learns that Denise is selling her salon, causing Jada to lose her job. She is comforted by Zack and they spend time together; Jada tries kissing Zack, but he rejects her. Jada lies to Sharon that Zack had kissed her instead, so Sharon decides to evicts him until Jade admits the truth. When Linda buys into the salon, Jada is reemployed.

When Jada sees Stuart Highway (Ricky Champ) purchasing pills, they have a heart-to heart and he realises his mistake. He asks Jada to dispose of the pills but Denise discovers the pills on Jada, and confiscates them. Lily Slater (Lillia Turner) steals them and gives them to Amy Mitchell (Ellie Dadd), who collapses after taking them. Jada is confronted by residents, including Linda, and she sacks Jada, who struggles to find another job. Janine convinces Jada to help her scheme against Linda, but when Linda rehires her, Jada refuses to help Janine. However, Janine has recorded Jada admitting her intentions for revenge and blackmails her into planting alcohol on Linda and reporting her to Social Services for neglecting and harming her daughter Annie. Jada is guilt-ridden and confesses the truth to Sharon before fleeing Walford with Alyssa. Jada agrees to return for Christmas Day with Alyssa and confesses to Sharon that Janine blackmailed her. Together, they reveal the truth to Linda and Mick Carter (Danny Dyer). In 2025, following Martin's funeral, Sharon leaves Walford in order to stay with Jada and Alyssa.

== Neil Hughes ==
Neil Hughes
- EastEnders character
- Portrayed by: Thomas Coombes
- Duration: 2021–2022
- First appearance: Episode 6387; 2 December 2021
- Last appearance: Episode 6470; 18 April 2022
- Introduced by: Jon Sen

Neil Hughes, played by Thomas Coombes, is a childhood friend of Aaron Monroe (Charlie Wernham) who is part of a far-right terrorist group. He first appears in Episode 6387, which originally aired on 2 December 2021.

Neil arranges numerous crimes to be committed against minority groups, including having Keegan Butcher-Baker (Zack Morris) beaten up, a bomb being planted at a mosque in Albert Square and assaulting a group of LGBTQ+ people including Ben Mitchell (Max Bowden), Callum Highway (Tony Clay), Stacey Slater (Lacey Turner), Eve Unwin (Heather Peace) and Ash Panesar (Gurlaine Kaur Garcha). He last appeared in Episode 6470, which originally aired on 18 April 2022, after he tried giving Harvey Monroe (Ross Boatman) a phone to keep in contact with Aaron, but Harvey decides to cut complete contact.

== Jordan Fox ==
Jordan Fox
- EastEnders character
- Portrayed by: Uncredited (2021–2024); Izaiah Hagan-Brown (2024–2026); Jahsaiah Williams (2026–present)
- Duration: 2021–present
- First appearance: Episode 6404; 27 December 2021
- Introduced by: Jon Sen
In-universe information
- Other names: Jordan Atkins
- Father: Gray Atkins
- Mother: Chelsea Fox
- Half-brothers: Mackenzie Atkins
- Half-sisters: Mia Atkins
- Grandfathers: Lucas Johnson; Alex Atkins
- Grandmothers: Denise Fox
- Uncles: Jordan Johnson; Raymond Fox
- Aunts: Libby Fox
- Other relatives: Sheila Atkins; Kim Fox; Pearl Fox; Mica Fox

Jordan Fox (also Atkins) is the son of established characters Chelsea Fox (Zaraah Abrahams) and Gray Atkins (Toby-Alexander Smith) who is born prematurely at 24 weeks. He is named after Chelsea's deceased half-brother, Jordan Johnson (Joivan Wade). Just before his birth, Chelsea discovers Gray's abuse towards his previous wife, Chantelle Atkins (Jessica Plummer) and attempts to escape from him.

Chelsea goes with Kheerat Panesar (Jaz Singh Deol) to get Jordan registered as 'Jordan Fox', without Gray's name on the birth certificate. However, she learns that he has already registered him as Jordan Atkins, with both his and Chelsa's name on the certificate, which devastates Chelsea as Gray now has full control and if they did split he has parental rights. Gray later attempts to flee Walford, taking Jordan along with his other two children, Mia (Mahalia Malcolm) and Mackenzie (Issac Lemonius) with him, but Karen Taylor (Lorraine Stanley) stops him after he admits to murdering Chantelle and is subsequently arrested and imprisoned. Jordan has a meningitis scare, due to Chelsea not having him vaccinated, but got the all clear.

In 2026, after the character had been uncredited since his debut, Jahsaiah Williams was cast as five-year-old Jordan. His casting coincided with a storyline which sees Jordan accidentally run over by Ian Beale (Adam Woodyatt).

== Other characters ==
Character	Episode date(s)	Actor	Circumstances
DS Latham	1 January	Kumbi Mushambi	A police officer who asks Stuart Highway (Ricky Champ) to talk in his car; Stuart is taken to the police station and Latham is present while Stuart is questioned by DI Steve Thompson (Philip Wright) off the record about Stuart's attack on Thompson.
Elspeth	7 January	Jo Coffey	Lucas Johnson's (Don Gilet) parole officer. He meets with her and says a recent attack on him was a coincidence and not targeted towards him. He tells her he is sticking to his parole conditions and she says she is impressed that he is not looking for revenge.
Dr Robinson	11 January	Jane Garda	A doctor who Jean Slater (Gillian Wright) visits after finding a lump in her breast. Dr Robinson is due to take a biopsy but Jean says she knows it is cancer. While Dr Robinson is out of the room, Jean leaves before having the biopsy.
Dr Shah	14 January	Bhawna Bhawsar	A doctor looking after Patrick Trueman (Rudolph Walker) following his stroke. She tells Patrick there should be no lasting damage. Patrick refuses to take his blood thinning medication but his wife, Sheree Trueman (Suzette Llewellyn) tells Dr Shah that she will make sure he does.
Dr Ibrahim Ramzen	15 January	Valmike Rampersad	A GP who Ian Beale (Adam Woodyatt) visits with his wife, Sharon Beale (Letitia Dean), when he is feeling unwell. He thinks he is struggling to recover following an attack the previous month and Sharon suggests it could be his mental health rather than something physical, so Dr Ramzen offers to give him blood tests and a mental health assessment.
Dr Hobbs	18–22 January (2 episodes)	Tim Lewis	A private doctor who Ian Beale (Adam Woodyatt) visits when he is feeling unwell. Dr Hobbs offers a toxicology examination in case Ian has taken an overdose. The next day, Dr Hobbs leaves Ian a voicemail saying the test results are concerning and asking Ian to call him.
Jed	25 January	James Backway	A man who Frankie Lewis (Rose Ayling-Ellis) introduces to Linda Carter (Kellie Bright) as the paternal half-brother of her dead maternal half-brother, Harry, on the anniversary of Harry's death. Jed says that his father never wanted anything to do with Harry but allowed him to keep in touch, which raises suspicions in Linda because her husband, Mick Carter (Danny Dyer), was raped by his carer, Katy Lewis (Simone Lahbib), when he was 12, resulting in Frankie's birth. Linda presses Jed for details on his connection to Harry, asking if he is actually Harry's father but Jed denies this and calls Linda sick, but then becomes angry and says he did as he promised and never mentioned Harry or what happened between Katy and "any of us", revealing that he and other boys were victims of Katy's and he is indeed Harry's father.
PC Turner	28 January	Poppy Roe	A police officer who takes a statement from Mick Carter (Danny Dyer) about the abuse he suffered as a child.
Darien	29 January	Alex Austin	A man who watches Lucas Johnson (Don Gilet) and Chelsea Fox (Zaraah Abrahams). Darien leaves something on some flowers, which Chelsea takes. Lucas then confronts Darien as a man who had previously attacked him. Darien asks if Lucas is the person who will be delivering drugs for Chelsea, to which Lucas says he is but does not know many details so Darien tells him details.
Bea	10 February	Maria Leaf	A clairvoyant who visits Max Branning (Jake Wood), however, he changes his mind about seeing her and accuses her of being a con artist. Bea talks about Max's daughter, Abi Branning (Lorna Fitzgerald) and says she can sense her presence. She says that Abi forgives Max for what happened in the past.
Simone Garner	12 February	Teresa Zaylor	A solicitor hired by Ian Beale (Adam Woodyatt) to finalise his annulment from Sharon Watts (Letitia Dean) and to make her the sole proprietor of The Queen Victoria public house.
DI Pine	12 February – 13 December (3 episodes)	Seabert Henry	A police colleague of Jack Branning (Scott Maslen), who tells Jack he is interviewing a victim of child sexual abuse. Jack sees Mick Carter (Danny Dyer) in the interview room.
Nurse Novia Fernandez	16 February	Yvonne Wickham	A nurse who treats Peter Beale (Dayle Hudson) after a fall but has to leave before she can administer pain relief.
Mrs Tenadii	16 February – 14 October (3 episodes)	Michelle Huirama	A hospital consultant who arrives to give Peter Beale (Dayle Hudson) pain relief after a fall but sees it has already been administered. Peter says he did it himself but she assumes his friend, Ash Kaur (Gurlaine Kaur Garcha), an off-duty nurse who has been drinking, has done it, and suspends Ash from her job pending an investigation.
Fern Driscoll	23 February	Carrie Bunyan	A pregnant woman that Ruby Allen (Louisa Lytton) meets at a clinic. She carries around a photo of her 12-week scan photo, which Ruby steals to pretend that she is pregnant.
Mike	4 March	Charlie MacGechan	Two men at the E20 nightclub that harass Tiffany Butcher-Baker (Maisie Smith) whilst she is serving them drinks.
Tony	4 March	Lewis Rainer	Two men at the E20 nightclub that harass Tiffany Butcher-Baker (Maisie Smith) whilst she is serving them drinks.
Amelia	8 March	Lydia Piechowiak	A talent scout who wants to audition Janet Mitchell (Grace) for a commercial.
Kel	11 March	Matt Tedford	
Jade	11 March	Libbi Fox	
Sally	16 March	Jill Stanford	Gavin Sullivan's (Paul Nicholas) sister. She informs Gavin's ex-wife Kathy Beale (Gillian Taylforth) of his death and later meets Kathy and Gavin's daughter, Sharon Watts (Letitia Dean), at his wake.
Fiona	22 March	Suzy Cooper	
Pricilla Madden	25 March	Chevin Dash	
Miss Bellamy	25 March	Maisie Greenwood	
Dr Cheng	25 March	Meryl Griffiths	
Richard	29 March	Nico Tatarowicz	
Alanagh	30 March	Shala Nyx	
Kam	30 March	Luke Kidd	
Paul Chewins	1 April – 16 June (3 episodes)	Scott Baker	
Tom	1 April – 21 May (3 episodes)	Richard Pryal	
Clara	5–6 April (2 episodes)	Chelsea Smith	
PC Murray	6 April	Charlotte Bradford	
Rafe Vaughan	12 April – 20 July (5 episodes)	Daniel Boys	
Chloe	15–16 April (2 episodes)	Saskia Chambers	
Billie	15–16 April (2 episodes)	Keturah Chambers	
Greg	15–19 April (3 episodes)	Lloyd Morris	
Judge Doherty	15 April	Lin Sagovsky	
DC Ahmed	15 April	Shelley McDonald	
DC Abrahams	15 April	Sophie Cartman	
Alex (Alexander) Oakton	16 April	Luke Higgins	
Leah	27 April	Amie Buhari	
DS Haden	30 April – 3 May (2 episodes)	Jo Napthine	
Dr Sakura Mori	4 May	Haruka Kuroda	
Jeremy	10–11 May (2 episodes)	Alim Jayda	
Reg	10–11 May (2 episodes)	Geoffrey Freshwater	
Rita	13 May	Madelyn Smedley	
Dr Nitesh Devi	13 May	Armaan Kirmani	
Georgina Barnes	24 May	Uncredited	
Cassie	17 May	Rhiannon Bailey	
Shanice	17 May	Siobhan Bevan	
Dwayne	25–28 May (3 episodes)	Emmanuel Ogunjinmi	A man that Kim Fox (Tameka Empson) meets at The Queen Victoria public house selling hand sanitiser. She approaches him and asks if he would like to go on a date, to which he says yes. When Kim's niece Chelsea Fox (Zaraah Abrahams) meets him, she informs Kim that he previously dated her best friend and cheated on her with four other women. The two pair up against Dwayne and mess up his car.
Fitzy	3–8 June (4 episodes)	Sam Buchanan	
Damon Ives	3 June – 13 August (3 episodes)	Ekow Otoo	
Mya	10 June	Lily Howkins	
Angela	15 June – 11 March 2022 (4 episodes)	Lisa Gorgin	
Ella	16 June	Maisey Bawden	
Chloe	16 June	Hannah Brian	
PC Johnson	15 July	Derek Oppong	
Nina	15 July	Mariah Louca	
Beth	19–23 July (2 episodes)	Natalie Spence	
Luce	29 July	Amelia Cavallo	
Liv	30 July	Grace Frost	
Jodie	2 August	Antonia Rita	
Nurse Teresa	5–13 August (2 episodes)	Brede McDermott	
James	10–24 August (2 episodes)	Ben Dilloway	
Waseem Qureshi	12 August – 3 December (3 episodes)	Faraz M. Khan	Imran Qureshi's (Reda Elazouar) brother. He helps Bobby Beale (Clay Milner Russell) to open a Mosque in Walford, but disagrees with the Mosque being located next to a gay bar.
Dr Spears	12–13 August (2 episodes)	Jacqueline Tate	
Jackie	13–20 August (4 episodes)	Suzanna Hamilton	
Imogen	16 August	Athena Stevens	
Glen Tilson	30 August	Neil Smye	
Carrie Walsh	6–10 September (3 episodes)	Lisa Cawthorne	
Dr Cole	7 September – 25 October (3 episodes)	Basienka Blake	
Judge Hallett	7–14 September (2 episodes)	Amanda Osborne	
DS Foden	14–17 September (3 episodes)	David Schaal	
Helen Baxter	16–17 September (2 episodes)	Louise Barrett	
Ethan	16–21 September (4 episodes)	Richard Bennett	
Alex Atkins	17 September	Charlie Roe	The father of Gray Atkins (Toby-Alexander Smith) who walked out of his life when Gray was young. Alex calls Gray and tells him that he is currently dying in hospital. Alex later dies from natural causes.
Omari	20 September	Michael Amariah	
Tyler Richards	20 September	Uncredited	
Lenny	23 September	Ben Nelson	
Mr Chris Hancock	24 September	Simon Tcherniak	
Nathan Wood	27 September – 1 October (3 episodes)	Tyrone Huntley	
Curtis	1 October	Adam Jackson-Smith	
Jamal	12 October	Aaron Phinehas Peters	
Alfie	12 October	Uncredited	
Mrs Davis	14 October	Jean Warren	
Troy	19 October – 18 November (2 episodes)	Craig Nash	
PC Goddard	26 October	Esther Shanson	
George	28–29 October (2 episodes)	Paul Albertson	
Justine Simpson	28–29 October (2 episodes)	Debra Michaels	
Maria Connor	2 November	Samia Longchambon	The Coronation Street character makes an uncredited cameo appearance as part of a week of crossover episodes to coincide with the 2021 United Nations Climate Change Conference (COP26).
Freddie	9 November	Samson Ajewole	
Mr Anderson	9 November	Jack Thomson	
Sophie	11 November	Francesca Williams	
Leanne	11 November	Camille Ucan	
Harriet	15 November	Alison Dowling	
Magda	15 November	Michelle Jeram	
DS Hawkins	16 November	Gunnar Cauthery	
Anna	30 November – 2 December (2 episodes)	Alice May Simpson	
Mr Pandit	6–9 December (3 episodes)	Andrew Joshi	
Cliff	13 December	Darren Clarke	
Woody	13 December	Phil Atkinson	
Erica	14 December	Libby Liburd	
Cody Harris	14 December	Joshua Lyster	
Derrick	14–16 December	Adam Achour	
Bill	16 December	Uncredited	A customer in The Queen Victoria pub.
Dr Reuben	28 December	Helene Maksoud	
Paula	31 December	Lisa Geoghan	
