= Delroy Atkinson =

British actor (born 1975)

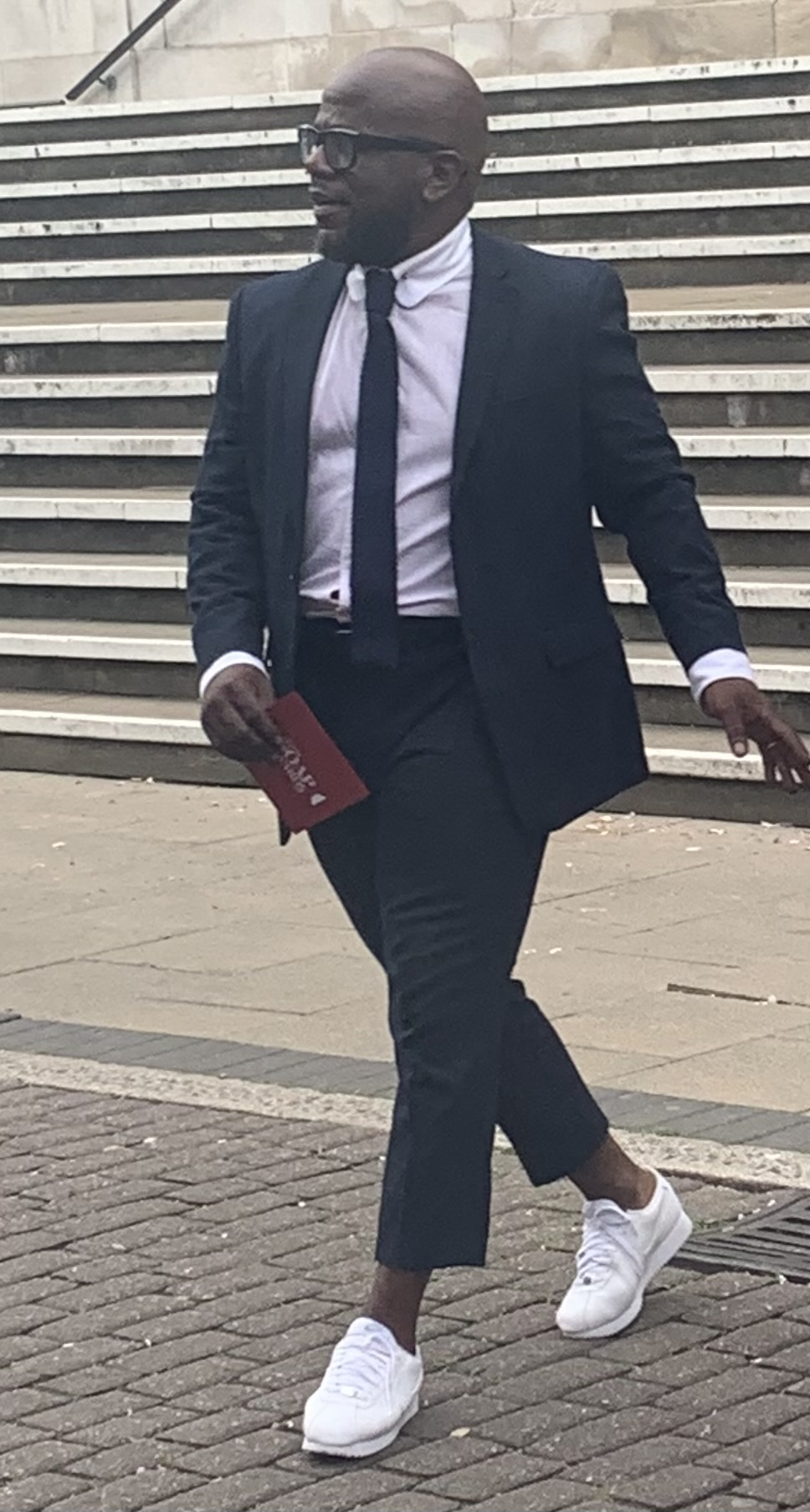
- Atkinson in 2022
- Born: Delroy Hugh Atkinson; 30 September 1975 (age 50); Surrey, England
- Education: Guildford School of Acting
- Occupation: Actor
- Years active: 1998–present

Delroy Hugh Atkinson (born 30 September 1975) is an English actor. He has appeared in an array of productions on both stage and screen, and since 2021, he has portrayed the role of Howie Danes on the BBC soap opera EastEnders.

== Early life and education ==
Delroy Hugh Atkinson was born on 30 September 1975 in Surrey, England to parents of Nigerian and West Indian descent.

He embarked on a three-year BA acting course at Guildford School of Acting.

== Career ==
Atkinson made his acting debut as Jason in the 1998 comedy film Still Crazy, and subsequently ventured into television roles, the first being Nathan Joseph in an episode of The Bill in 2000.

He went on to appear in several stage productions including Treasure Island, The Tempest and The Lion, the Witch and the Wardrobe. Over the next decade, he portrayed guest roles in Moonmonkeys (2007), After You've Gone (2008), Small Island (2009) and My Family (2010).

In 2017, Atkinson portrayed Pike in the 2017 film Pirates of the Caribbean: Salazar's Revenge. In 2019, he appeared in Luther and A Christmas Carol for the BBC. In 2021, Atkinson appeared in an episode of Death in Paradise and four episodes of Holby City as terminally ill patient Delroy Jones.

Later in 2021, he was cast in the BBC soap opera EastEnders as Howie Danes. His character was introduced as part of a story exploring the disappearance of established character Vincent Hubbard (Richard Blackwood) and later becomes a love interest for Kim Fox (Tameka Empson).

== Filmography ==
Year	Title	Role	Notes	Ref.
1998	Still Crazy	Jason	Film	
2000	The Bill	Nathan Joseph	Episode: "Carnival"	
2007	Moonmonkeys	Policeman #2	Television film	
2008	No Heroics	Newspaper vendor	Episode: "Supergroupie"	
2008	After You've Gone	Man in queue	Episode: "The Lure of the Rings"	
2009	Small Island	Fulton	Television miniseries	
2010	My Family	Karaoke D.J.	Episode: "Ben Behaving Badly"	
2011	Driver: San Francisco	Additional voices	Video game	
2017	Pirates of the Caribbean: Salazar's Revenge	Pike	Film	
2017	Fighter	Len	Short film	
2018	Star Cops	Charles Hardin	Main role	
2019	Luther	Derek Hayes	2 episodes	
2019	Circus Act	Unknown	Short film	
2019	A Christmas Carol	Mr Thwaites	Television miniseries	
2020	Enola Holmes	Porter	Film	
2020	Blithe Spirit	Reverend Green	Film	
2021	It's a Sin	Mr. Ibisu	2 episodes	
2021	Death in Paradise	Godrell James	Episode: "Fake or Fortune"	
2021	King Gary	Lenny	1 episode	
2021	Holby City	Delroy Jones	Recurring role	
2021	Getting Better - The Fight for the NHS	Teddy Laburn	Podcast series	
2021	For Love	Andy	Short film	
2021–present	EastEnders	Howie Danes	Regular role	
2022	Screw	Kyrel Mackenzie	1 episode	
2022	Dodger	Smuggler	Episode: "Mudlarks"	
2022	The Last Bus	Bethan's Dad	1 episode	
2022	Choose or Die	Officer Carpenter	Film role	
2022	The Kimfluencer	Howie Danes	Television miniseries	
2022	Mrs. Harris Goes to Paris	Chandler	Film role	
2022	Whitstable Pearl	Lawyer	Episode: "Night Terrors"	
2022	Slow Horses	Bus Driver	Episode: "Last Stop"	
2022	Riches	Pastor	Episode: "What Needs To Be Done"	
2023	Silo	Apartment Custodian	Episode: "The Relic"	
2023	Not Going Out	Neighbour	Episode: "Wilfred"	
2024	Secret Level	Luzum	Episode: "Dungeons & Dragons: The Queen's Cradle"; voice	
2026	Ted Lasso	Matt	Episode: "Follow the Anger"	

== Stage ==
Title	Role	Venue	Ref.
Treasure Island	Captain Smollett	Southampton Nuffield Theatre	
The Tempest	Trinculo	Southampton Nuffield Theatre	
The Lion, the Witch and the Wardrobe	Grumpskin	West Yorkshire Playhouse	
Poison	Ensemble, u/s Lucky	Tricycle Theatre	
Our Country's Good	Cpt. Tench/Aborigine	Nuffield Theatre	
The Enchanted Pig	Sun/King of the West	Young Vic	
Lautrec	Chocolat	Shaftesbury Theatre	
Bomb-itty of Errors	Antipholus	New Ambassadors Theatre	
The Harder They Come	Longa	Theatre Royal Stratford East	
Twelfth Night	Sebastian	Southampton Nuffield Theatre	
Porgy and Bess	Nelson	Andrew Fell Ltd.	
Come Dancing	Hamilton	Theatre Royal Stratford East	
Lost in the Stars	Johannes Parfuri	Royal Festival Hall	
Shrek	White Rabbit, u/s Donkey	Theatre Royal, Drury Lane	
Dick Whittington	Shirley the Cook (Dame)	Theatre Royal Stratford East	
Jerry Springer: The Opera	Dikhembe Olayjoan - Muthumbo	Royal National Theatre/Cambridge Theatre	
Wah Wah Girls	Cal	Sadler's Wells	
The Harder They Come	The Preacher	Theatre Royal Stratford East	
Avenue Q	Gary Coleman	Noël Coward Theatre/Gielgud Theatre/Wyndham's Theatre	
The Amen Corner	Brother Washington	Royal National Theatre	
All My Sons	Frank Lubey	Manchester Royal Exchange	
Albion	Kyle	Bush Theatre	
The Book of Mormon	The General	Prince of Wales Theatre	
Kiss Me Kate	Gangster	Sheffield Crucible	
The Firm	Trent	Hampstead Theatre	
Present Laughter	Fred	Chichester Festival Theatre	
Sylvia	Winston Churchill	The Old Vic	
Edmond de Bergerac	Honoré	Birmingham Repertory Theatre	
The Man in the White Suit	Mr Hoskins	Wyndham's Theatre	
Hex	Bruiser Thorn	Royal National Theatre	
