= Iqra Ahmed =

Fictional character from EastEnders

- EastEnders character
- Portrayed by: Priya Davdra
- Duration: 2019–2022
- First appearance: Episode 5871; 19 February 2019
- Last appearance: Episode 6410; 3 January 2022
- Introduced by: John Yorke
In-universe information
- Occupation: Restaurateur
- Sisters: Habiba Ahmed; Sakina Ahmed
- Grandfathers: Arshad Ahmed
- Grandmothers: Mariam Ahmed
- Nephews: Tyrion Ahmed
- Other relatives: Masood Ahmed

Iqra Ahmed is a fictional character from the BBC soap opera EastEnders, played by Priya Davdra. Davdra's casting as Iqra was announced on 20 December 2018, along with that of Habiba. Both characters were called feisty and the BBC stated that they would both make an impact on Walford. Iqra is the elder sister of Habiba, and is described as "no-nonsense, bold and intelligent". Iqra makes her first appearance in episode 5871, originally broadcast on 19 February 2019. Alongside sister Habiba Ahmed (Rukku Nahar), Iqra is introduced as a relative of established character Masood Ahmed (Nitin Ganatra). Iqra's final appearance aired on 3 January 2022.

Iqra's initial storylines revolve around taking over the local restaurant with Habiba and exposing family friend Adam Bateman (Stephen Rahman-Hughes) for cheating on his partner, Honey Mitchell (Emma Barton) but as senior executive producer Kate Oates developed her character, her later storylines have involved coming out as a lesbian to her family and local residents, the introduction of her long-term girlfriend Ash Kaur (Gurlaine Kaur Garcha), her and Ash's eventual breakup and forming a relationship with Mila Marwa (Ruhtxjiaïh Bèllènéa). Iqra has been praised by the media for being the first Muslim lesbian to be featured on EastEnders.

== Casting and characterisation ==
Davdra's casting and details surrounding the character were announced on 20 December 2018. The role of Iqra marks Davdra's television debut. Her prior roles include a film, short films, advertisements and a voiceover on a video game. After the announcement of her casting, Davdra confirmed on Instagram that the characters would begin appearing on the series from February 2019. She voiced her excitement at being able to join the soap due to enjoying it in her youth, as well as wanting to see the viewers' reaction to Iqra.

The BBC described Iqra as "no-nonsense, bold and intelligent" and added that "she arrives in Walford with a clear goal but she soon learns that life in the Square is never simple, especially when her sister is involved." Aidan Milan of Metro wrote that Iqra would soon make an impression due to her bold and assertive qualities. Senior executive producer Kate Oates stated that the Ahmed sisters are "a force to be reckoned with". She hinted that they would be a "nightmare" for their relatives Mariam (Indira Joshi) and Arshad Ahmed (Madhav Sharma) as well as other characters on EastEnders.

== Development ==
=== Sexuality and religion ===
Iqra is initially portrayed as heterosexual, with the media reporting a possible romance with Kush Kazemi (Davood Ghadami). However, throughout her first few weeks on the series, Iqra hints at a secret that could threaten her time in Walford. Then in a scene with Habiba, it is revealed that Iqra has run away from an arranged marriage. Habiba asks if she has met another man, to which Iqra comes out as lesbian by saying she has met a woman. An EastEnders source stated that Iqra had been "fighting to keep her sexuality quiet" but that the truth needed to emerge eventually. Later scenes see her come out to her grandparents, where she reveals her relationship with long-term girlfriend Ash Panesar (Gurlaine Kaur Garcha). When asked about the storyline, Davdra commented: "It was amazing. I think EastEnders has done amazing bringing this storyline out. I'm so proud to be presenting this storyline."

Iqra is the first lesbian Muslim to appear on EastEnders. In an episode broadcast on 18 February 2020, Iqra, Habiba and Bobby Beale (Clay Milner Russell) are the victims of an islamophobic attack. Iqra's religion is made a topic of conversation in the series, as Ash is a Sikh. The media reported that fans of the soap suspected that Ash's mother, Suki Panesar (Balvinder Sopal), would kill Iqra in an act of honour, due to the difference in religion, with Jessica Williams of the Daily Express stating "Iqra in danger as Suki plots dark revenge".

=== Relationships ===
Iqra's sisterhood with Habiba has been a key relationship for her character since Iqra's introduction. Before their arrival on the programme, Habiba accompanied Iqra to run from their parents and Iqra's arranged marriage. Worried about being found, Iqra closes herself off, and Habiba encourages her to live her life to the fullest, stating "this is about us standing up for the lives we want to live". When Iqra comes out as lesbian to Habiba, she is initially shocked but supportive, and when Iqra wants to keep her sexuality a secret, Habiba covers for her with Mariam and Arshad.

Iqra's relationship with Ash begins exploration on 29 August 2019 when Iqra introduces her to Mariam and Arshad. It is explained that Iqra and Ash have been in a relationship since 2018, but were unable to be publicly together due to Iqra's arranged marriage. Initially, Iqra struggles to express her relationship with Ash in public due to not being open about her sexuality. Not wanting to upset Ash, Iqra pulls her in for a kiss in front of the residents. Later scenes see Iqra wanting to meet Ash's family, but Ash being secretive about them. Radio Times gave the couple the portmanteau "Ashra".

In March 2021, months after her breakup with Ash, a potential romance with Mila was hinted. Joe Anderton of Digital Spy believed that the romance would be well-deserved for Iqra. Speaking on the potential pairing, actress Davdra explained that her character begins to see Mila as a chance to build a strong relationship without secrets. She described Iqra's relationship with Ash as untrustworthy and hoped that the pairing with Mila would be the opposite. Davdra also explained that Iqra sees getting to know Mila as a chance to do something for herself, as she typically does things for other people such as Habiba, her grandparents and Ash. She opined that Mila would be a good match for her character, stating: "Iqra is more sensible and level headed and Mila is a form of excitement that has come into her life. They share a similar experience of coming out and their cultural backgrounds. "I feel like they are similar in certain areas, and then very different – opposites attract, but Mila does bring Iqra out of her shell." It was stated by Digital Spy that Iqra would learn a "heartbreaking" secret about Mila in forthcoming scenes. Davdra explained that Iqra initially suspects it is something regarding her due to her failed relationship with Ash. However, she learns that Mila's family is homophobic which led to her changing her name and running away. Davdra stated that Iqra understands how Mila feels, since she has been through a similar thing. She explained: "[Iqra] came out only recently to her family so she definitely understands what Mila is going through and can advise her based on her experience."

=== Departure ===
On 3 January 2022, in previously unannounced scenes, Iqra made the decision to take a job offer away from Albert Square. Following the episode airing, both Davdra and an EastEnders spokesperson confirmed that Davdra had exited her role as Iqra. Digital Spy described her exit as a "low-key departure" due to having no final scenes with Mila or Kioni. Posting about her exit on social media, Davdra said that it was "an absolute pleasure" to play the role of Iqra and that she would miss it, but confirmed that she had left to pursue other acting projects.

== Storylines ==
Before moving to Walford, Iqra was preparing to marry a man through arranged marriage, but runs away with her sister Habiba Ahmed (Rukku Nahar). When Iqra learns that family friend Adam Bateman (Stephen Rahman-Hughes) is having an affair with Habiba behind Honey Mitchell (Emma Barton)'s back, she threatens to expose him. Having seen texts from an unknown person called Ash on Iqra's phone, he counteracts her threat by saying he will expose her secret relationship. Alone, Habiba asks Iqra if it is true, and Iqra nods. Habiba asks who he is, and Iqra replies by saying she is in a relationship with a woman. Rather than letting Adam expose her, she introduces her girlfriend, Ash Kaur (Gurlaine Kaur Garcha), to her grandparents, Mariam (Indira Joshi) and Arshad Ahmed (Madhav Sharma). When they are in a club, men make comments about the pair, with Robbie Jackson (Dean Gaffney) flirting with Ash. Initially wanting to hide that she is a lesbian, she insists they are friends, which Ash is uncomfortable with. Iqra then pulls Ash in for a kiss in front of a crowd.

Iqra teams up with Keegan Baker (Zack Morris) by setting up a sandwich business to rival the business of Ian Beale (Adam Woodyatt) and when he tries to sabotage the pair, Iqra insists on making the business a success. She receives a van from her uncle Masood Ahmed (Nitin Ganatra), and the pair begin delivering sandwiches. When leaving mosque with Habiba and Bobby Beale (Clay Milner Russell), the three are attacked in an Islamophobic assault. The gang tear Iqra's headscarf from her head and strangle Bobby with it, and throw Iqra to the ground, shouting Islamophobic remarks at the three of them. Iqra expresses that she wants to meet the Panesars, but Ash avoids the subject. When Ash's brothers Jags (Amar Adatia), Vinny (Shiv Jalota) and Kheerat Panesar (Jaz Deol) arrive in Walford with mother Suki Panesar (Balvinder Sopal), Iqra is excited to get to know them. However, due to her Muslim faith conflicting with their Sikh faith, they ignore her friendly attempts.

When an innocent Jags is jailed for a crime he did not commit, Habiba decides to leave Walford to live nearby to his prison. Iqra comes to the realisation that Ash is more dedicated to the Panesars than to her, and after Ash confides in her that she knew Jags is innocent, Iqra blames her for Habiba moving away. She ends their relationship and later begins getting to know Mila Marwa (Ruhtxjiaïh Bèllènéa). She feels Mila is being secretive and withholding information from her, so presses her for information. Mila confides in Iqra that her family are homophobic leading to her running away from home, and that her genitals were mutilated during childhood. Iqra phones the police on Mila's mother Nyangi Marwa (Lucy Vandi) when she suspects that Nyangi is doing the same to Mila's sister Kioni Marwa (Florisa Kamara). Before the same can happen to Kioni, Iqra calls the police and reports Nyangi, leading to her arrest. Although Mila is initially angry with Iqra, she later forgives her. Iqra, Bobby, Mila, Kioni and Bobby's girlfriend Dana Monroe (Barbara Smith) plan to turn the Argee Bhajee restaurant into a mosque. However, their plans are consistently thwarted by Islamophobic individuals. On one occasion, the group is confronted by a racist gang. While Iqra and Kioni escape, Dana is viciously attacked. Iqra is later sorry for leaving her on her own. Iqra is unaware that Dana's brother Aaron Monroe (Charlie Wernham) is also Islamophobic and he is planning to bomb the Argee Bhajee. However, the restaurant backs on to The Prince Albert gay bar. On New Year's Eve 2021, Aaron plans to set the bomb off, with a packed bar celebrating New Year. However, he cannot go through with it. The entire community, including Iqra, are shaken at what could have happened when they find out about the bomb. A few days later, Iqra confides in Bobby that she has succeeded in obtaining her dream job in a hotel. However, she is unsure about leaving Walford behind. She also is hesitant to say goodbye to him, Mila and Kioni. Bobby assures her that everything will be okay and he encourages her to follow her dreams. Buoyed by his advice, Iqra leaves the Square.

== Reception ==
Upon their arrival, viewers' opinions on Iqra and sister Habiba were mixed, with Angie Quinn of My London stating that "some viewers love them, others are less keen". Initially, viewers deemed the characters "annoying", "irritating" and "wooden". Helen Fear of Entertainment Daily commented: "Hopefully viewers will warm to the new characters", and added "Bad news for haters, as the pair are definitely sticking around." However, opinions on Iqra changed as her tenure on the programme developed her character, with Duncan Lindsay of Metro tweeting "Habiba and Iqra are fantastic characters [...] you have to give characters time to breathe, settle in and become their own." The changing opinion has been accredited to senior executive producer Kate Oates, who took over from John Yorke. When details of the coming out storyline were reported, Stonewall praised it, commenting: "We're really hoping these reports are true because we need to see more LGBT Muslims on screen, and better representation of lesbians." Justin Harp described Iqra's relationship with Ash as a "powerful love story", as well as praising Iqra's involvement with Mila's female genital mutilation storyline.

== See also ==
- List of fictional lesbian characters
- List of LGBT characters in television and radio
- List of LGBTQ characters in soap operas
