= Kim Fox =

Fictional character from EastEnders

- EastEnders character
- Portrayed by: Tameka Empson
- Duration: 2009–present
- First appearance: Episode 3898; 24 November 2009
- Created by: Dominic Treadwell-Collins
- Introduced by: Diederick Santer (2009); Bryan Kirkwood (2010)
- Spin-off appearances: EastEnders: E20 (2011); The B&B (2012); Tamwar Tales – The Life of an Assistant Market Inspector (2013); Kimfluencer (2022)
In-universe information
- Other names: Kimberley Harmony Angelica Fox; Kim Fox-Hubbard; Kim Fox-Danes
- Occupation: Beautician; B&B owner; Businesswoman; Barmaid; Cruise ship singer; Shop assistant; Matchmaker; Social media influencer; Bar manager; Salon owner; Hairdresser
- Mother: Emerald Fox
- Half-sisters: Denise Fox; Daphne Fox
- Husband: Vincent Hubbard (2013–2018); Howie Danes (2026–present)
- Sons: Mica Fox
- Daughters: Pearl Fox
- Stepsons: Denzel Danes
- Nephews: Raymond Fox
- Nieces: Chelsea Fox; Libby Fox
- Other relatives: Jordan Fox; Colm

Kim Fox (also Fox-Hubbard and Fox-Danes) is a fictional character from the BBC soap opera EastEnders, played by Tameka Empson. She is the half-sister of Denise Fox (Diane Parish), and aunt to Chelsea (Tiana Benjamin/Zaraah Abrahams) and Libby Fox (Belinda Owusu). She first appeared as a guest character on 24 November 2009, and was reintroduced in June 2010 as a regular character after piquing the interest of new executive producer Bryan Kirkwood. Empson took maternity leave in October 2013 and after appearing several times during her break via webcam, Kim returned to Albert Square on 30 December 2014. It was announced on 16 July 2019 that Empson would be taking a break from the show but will return at some point in the future. She departed on 23 July 2019. Kim made a special appearance via webcam on 25 December 2019. Empson returned following her maternity break in the episode broadcast on 16 November 2020. Empson took a brief break in early 2024, with Kim departing on 25 January 2024, returning on 10 June 2024.

Kim is described as "viscous and bubbly" on the outside, but hiding vulnerability and low self-esteem. The EastEnders website describes Kim as having big hair, a loud personality, hyperactive and a big heart. She is sharp, family-orientated and cares about her appearance, having a loud dress sense and being the life and soul of any party. She chooses the wrong men to have relationships with, but knows what she wants when it comes to love. Kim makes her first appearance for Denise's wedding to Lucas Johnson (Don Gilet). She briefly returns after Denise is presumed dead, but makes a more permanent return when she separates from her boyfriend Dexter Mulholland (Robbie Gee). Kim kisses Ricky Butcher (Sid Owen), sparking a brief feud with his wife, Bianca (Patsy Palmer). She establishes a short-lived speakeasy and later opens a bed and breakfast. Kim also goes through an HIV scare and has a relationship with Ray Dixon (Chucky Venn). Kim gives birth to her daughter, Pearl, prematurely during EastEnders Live Week, which celebrated EastEnders' 30th anniversary. In later storylines, Kim suffers a miscarriage, has to cope with becoming a single mother to her and Vincent Hubbard's (Richard Blackwood) children, Pearl and Mica, following Vincent's mysterious disappearance, has a relationship with Howie Danes (Delroy Atkinson), becomes a social media influencer, and develops post-traumatic stress disorder from a car accident with Howie's teenage son Denzel (Jaden Ladega).

Kim is often shown in a comedic light and as a result, Empson earned a nomination for "Best Comedy Performance" at the 2011 British Soap Awards. That same year she won the "Funniest Performance" award at the Inside Soap Awards and again the following year. Ruth Deller from entertainment website Lowculture praised the character during her guest appearance in 2009 and later said Kim is a "big, ballsy, whirlwind", who provides some light relief to the show. Daniel Maier from The Guardian has criticised Kim's B&B venture, calling it a "holding pen for characters who are 'between homes' within Albert Square's hermetically sealed biosphere."

== Creation and development ==
=== Introduction ===
Kim was referenced multiple times following Denise's arrival in EastEnders. She initially appeared as a guest character, along with her boyfriend Dexter, between 24 and 27 November 2009. In December 2009, executive producer Diederick Santer was asked by entertainment website Digital Spy if there were plans for Kim and Dexter to return. He said, "There's nothing currently storylined for Kim and Dexter, but they really caught my eye. I know they've caught [incoming executive producer] Bryan [Kirkwood]'s eye, too, because we were only talking about them recently. They work brilliantly with the rest of the family. I hope that if the actors are up for it and if me or Bryan find the right moment, we'll see them again." Kim was subsequently brought back as a regular character by Kirkwood in 2010, on which he said, "I'm a huge fan of Tameka. She is a real talent and will bring a fresh, funny and exciting new flavour to the show." Empson said "I'm really thrilled and excited to be returning to EastEnders. I've always loved the show and working with such fantastic actors makes the whole experience even sweeter. Kim Fox is such a great character to play and gives me scope to do things I usually wouldn't get away with." Kim's return was aired on 4 June 2010. Empson also believes that she is different from Kim, commenting : "I don't know if I am, you know! In a way yes, and no. She's bolder than myself. She can go on all night – I need a break in between dancing and stuff! I like good shoes, comfortable shoes. But it all works [for Kim], from the toes right the way up." Empson managed to win the 'Funniest Female' award at the 2012 Inside Soap Awards.

=== Characterisation and style ===
With the announcement of Kim's permanent return to Albert Square, the character was described as "viscous and bubbly" on the outside, but hiding vulnerability and low self-esteem by Kris Green of Digital Spy. The EastEnders website describes Kim as having "big hair", a "loud personality" and a big heart to match." It continues to read: "With dress sense louder than Bianca Jackson's brood and an unsuitable boyfriend in toe, you will definitely know when Kim Fox enters the building! With her big hair and loud personality she is always the life and soul of the party. Kim's appearance is important to her, but she's not concerned about labels – for her it is 'upkeep on the cheap'. She might look like a long in the tooth ghetto princess, but scratch beneath the surface and you will find a sharp, family-orientated person with a big heart." Kim has also been described as "feisty".

When it comes to love, Kim knows what she wants – a hunk with a good heart. But somehow always ends up choosing the wrong man – like her last boyfriend Dexter who cheated on her with some of his restaurant staff. But Kim knows love does exist, she has seen in magazines!

— The BBC describes Kim's view on love (2010)

While speaking to the Press Association, Empson said she felt good about bringing humour to EastEnders through her character. The actress explained "I think people want to smile, people want to have a laugh and I love Kim. You get so much theatre with Kim. I'm not actually like her but I love it. I like to party like Kim, but Kim can out-drink me any time." Empson said of the character and her style: "I like to have a good time but Kim's like ten times more full-on than me. Her outfits—I could only dream about wearing her outfits. The tighter the better for Kim! I like a bit of comfort and to be able to breathe. [...] Kim knows no bounds—she feels no shame. Kim's very feminine and she's all about 'the look' and pampering herself."

=== Storyline development ===
Speaking in July 2010 about the storyline where Denise is discovered to be alive, Empson told Digital Spy that finding out was "crazy" for Kim, but said that "It's the start of a new direction for Kim and Denise, though." Speaking about Kim's relationship with Denise, Empson said that they are "chalk and cheese—and the macaroni's yet to be made. You'll start to see—even more than you can now—that Denise and Kim are very different. You'll start to wonder how they can be sisters! They're Foxes by blood, though. They'll watch each other's backs but at the same time, they'll tear each other down. They won't let anyone else tear the other down, though—that's their job!"

In September 2010, Empson teased that Kim would stir things up with her kiss with Ricky Butcher (Sid Owen): "Well put it this way, all the men are in my eyesight. [...] I don't think anybody is safe from Kim."

Empson revealed in December 2011 that both Kim and Denise will stand up to Phil Mitchell after they receive incriminating evidence about him on Christmas Day. They are both shocked when they find a USB stick which contains a recording of Phil confessing the role he had in Kevin's death. Speaking to Inside Soap, Empson commented: "When all the information about Kevin Wicks and Phil blows up, it comes out of nowhere for the Fox girls. Kevin's death was way before Kim's time, so she's bewildered by the whole thing. They wonder why someone would tell them about such a thing on Christmas Day. Kim knows no fear. It might be Phil, but she's not afraid to take him on. The Mitchells think that they're the big guns in the Square – but as far as Kim's concerned, the Fox family are the same. They might not have the same numbers as the Mitchells, but they won't shy away from a fight." Empson added that she gets on much better with McFadden when not filming. She commented: "He's such a great actor because he's not like his character Phil at all. He's so lovely."

=== Temporary departure (2019) ===
On 16 July 2019, Empson announced that she would be taking a break from the soap. She did not specify the length of her break, but confirmed that she would return to EastEnders at some point in the future. In response to her break, Kim was written to have a job offer in Scotland as a tour guide. Despite still being on a break, Empson featured as Kim for a special webcam appearance in December 2019, talking to her family at Christmas dinner. Then in July 2020, it was confirmed on This Morning that Empson would be reprising her role of Kim, and would return to filming in the near future. She also confirmed on Loose Women that the break was her maternity leave for her second child, and that she did not deliberately keep it a secret, but she "just wanted to enjoy it".

== Storylines ==
Kim visits Walford to attend the wedding of her half sister, Denise Fox (Diane Parish). She is disappointed by her plans for a low-key hen night, so organises a livelier event. During her visit, Kim's partner, Dexter Mulholland (Robbie Gee), makes a pass at her niece, Chelsea Fox (Tiana Benjamin), but she chooses to forgive him. She makes a repeat visit seven months later and reveals that she has broken up with Dexter, as he was unfaithful to her. The following month, Kim is told that Denise has 'committed suicide'. She returns to Walford for the funeral, as does her sister, Daphne Fox (Emi Wokoma). It later transpires that Denise is still alive, as her death was staged by her husband, Lucas Johnson (Don Gilet). Kim comes to stay with her, having once more separated from Dexter. She begins working at the local beauty salon and establishes a short-lived speakeasy. Kim causes trouble by kissing her married neighbour, Ricky Butcher (Sid Owen). His wife, Bianca (Patsy Palmer), finds out and is initially furious, but she and Kim forge a bond and become friends. Despite earlier conflict over her speakeasy, Kim also becomes friends with Kat Moon (Jessie Wallace), landlady of the local pub. When Dexter buys Kim out of their restaurant business, she purchases the house next door to Denise's and opens a bed and breakfast, called "Kimberley's Palace". It becomes her sole source of income when she is fired from the beauty salon for her lax attitude to work. Walford's new GP, Yusef Khan (Ace Bhatti), makes a long term booking at the B&B. Kim is initially attracted to him, but refrains from pursuing him as Denise is also interested in him. She accidentally tells Masood Ahmed (Nitin Ganatra) that Denise and Yusef haven't had sex yet which Masood uses to his advantage by telling Denise. Denise is at first annoyed with Kim for telling people about her private life, but they later reconcile. The next day, Kim helps out at Tommy Moon's christening.

Kim wakes up in a skip and after initially lets Patrick and Denise believe she may have been attacked. However, Patrick find CCTV footage of a drunken Kim entering the local shop, the Minute Mart, late at night and taking alcohol. Kim explains to Denise that her erratic behaviour is due to a former boyfriend telling her that he has contracted HIV. Denise persuades Kim to take a HIV test which comes back negative, leaving Kim relieved. After Yusef sets the B&B on fire, Kim, Patrick and Denise are left homeless, so they move in with brothers Anthony (Matt Lapinskas) and Tyler Moon (Tony Discipline) and borrow clothes from friends. Kim starts spending money, thinking that insurance will cover the damage, but Patrick tells her that he was holding illegal alcohol and fireworks in the B&B, which made the fire worse, and the insurance may not pay out. Kim is angry and says she no longer wants to live with Patrick, but Denise later convinces Kim that her material possessions are not what matters and they should be a family. After the insurance company refuse to pay for the damage, Patrick decides to retire and offers Kim and Denise the Minute Mart. Kim arranges a blind date, and on her way to it, is saved by Ray Dixon (Chucky Venn) from a falling ladder. She is attracted to him, and later when he sees she has been stood up, he offers to get her another drink. However, she is disappointed to learn that he has two children, saying she is fed up of men with "baggage". She then tries to chat up Gethin Williams (Bradley Freegard), but he harshly rejects her.

She turns her attention back to Ray after seeing him running and tells him she has started a fitness venture called "Kimba". She enlists some people to come to the class but Ray does not come. Ray asks Kim out but she says she has a date, and then meets Sinclair (Colin Michael Carmichael) from the Internet. Sinclair makes inappropriate comments about Kim's race. Ray calls Kim easy so she slaps him, and she then slaps Sinclair for his comments. When Zainab Masood (Nina Wadia) inherits all of Yusef's money, she gives it to Kim and Denise but is unhappy when they start spending it frivolously. Kim and Ray eventually reconcile and they share a kiss, although Kim continues to play hard to get, pretending she does not like him. Kim dislikes it when she sees Ray and Roxy Mitchell (Rita Simons) playfight in the kitchen. She also becomes jealous when she overhears him flirting with Bianca whilst helping in the kitchen. As a result, she accidentally slices off the top of Ray's finger when he tries to help her fillet some fish. She accompanies him to the hospital where they open up to one another and decide to start a relationship. Ray is upset when his son, Morgan (Devon Higgs) moves away. To cheer him up, Kim organises an intimate evening for them, however Ray arrives with his daughter, Sasha (Rebecca Sanneh). Kim is shocked and tells Ray that, although she is interested in him, she does not think she can take on his children. Denise convinces Kim that she needs to accept Sasha and arranges for Kim to look after her. It goes well and she promises to do it again.

Meanwhile, a man from the local council tells Kim that the new name for the B&B, Kim's Olympic Palace, infringes copyright. The next day, Kim is disappointed as the B&B's sign is taken down. Kim and Sasha start to bond and Kim and Ray declare their love for one another. When the B&B opens, Denise is annoyed by Kim's apathetic approach to running the place and quits. Kim struggles to run the B&B by herself and they later reconcile. When playing basketball with Sasha and Morgan, Kim smashes a window in the charity shop. Sasha takes the blame and works there, but she is unhappy, so Kim says she will organise some work experience for Sasha with a forensic scientist. Kim later admits this was a lie, leading to Ray moving out. Kim then gets Sasha a placement with Les Coker's (Roger Sloman) firm of funeral directors, and Ray and Kim make up. Kim discovers that Ray has been looking for flats locally and she assumes that Ray is looking for somewhere for them both to live. However, she is left upset and humiliated when Ray reveals that the flat is actually for Sasha's mother, Deanne, so that they can both be closer to Sasha. Ray affirms his love for her and they reconcile. A few months later, Ray kisses Denise, and when Kim finds out, Ray says Denise initiated it. Kim slaps Denise and disowns her, however they soon reconcile. Ray ends his relationship with Kim, who is devastated and blames Denise, saying she does not want to see her again. Kim and Denise reconcile again when Ray admits he kissed Denise. A few months later Kim and Ray resume their relationship. Ray learns that Deanne has been in an accident and so decides to move to Essex to be closer to Sasha. Kim agrees to move with him, but at her birthday party she realises they do not have much in common and decides to stay, saying a tearful goodbye to him. Kim departs to work on a cruise ship, and during her time away, she marries Vincent Hubbard (Richard Blackwood).

Kim returns to Walford after splitting from Vincent and reveals to Denise that she is pregnant. Kim struggles with caring for Patrick, who has suffered a stroke. Kim goes into premature labour and gives birth to a girl, Pearl. She briefly falls out with Denise when she insults Kim's failed marriage, and leaves a voicemail and a text message for Vincent, informing him that he is a father. She regrets this afterwards and confides in Kat, Patrick, Linda Carter (Kellie Bright) and Shirley Carter (Linda Henry) that after the cruise, she visited Vincent to tell him she was pregnant but discovered he was a criminal when she saw him covered in blood and fled. Pearl develops an infection and is ill in hospital for several months, and when she brings her daughter home, Kim finds Vincent waiting for her. He explains that he was helping the victim of a mugging when she saw him, and although she is still suspicious, she reunites with him. She provides him with a false alibi for the assault on a drug dealer and key witness at Dot Branning's (June Brown) trial, and later discovers from his foster sister Donna Yates (Lisa Hammond) that he did this for Ronnie Mitchell (Samantha Womack), a former girlfriend of his. She confronts Ronnie thinking she is having an affair with Vincent, but they explain they are no longer together, although Kim tells Ronnie to stay away from Vincent. Vincent cons Phil Mitchell (Steve McFadden) into giving him his wife, Sharon Mitchell's (Letitia Dean) bar, The Albert. Sharon reinvests in the bar and Kim competes with Sharon to manage it. Vincent surprises Kim with news that he has bought them a house, but Denise tells Kim that he is just sweetening her up and Patrick throws him out of the house. Vincent tries to win Kim back by saying the new house is for Pearl. Kim decides to move on from Vincent but soon changes her mind and they kiss. Kim and Vincent's mother, Claudette Hubbard (Ellen Thomas), then realise that Vincent has invited them both to live with him without telling them. When Claudette accuses Kim of freeloading, Kim decides to sell her share of her house, where Denise and Patrick live, which leaves them with a smaller home.

Kim is shocked to discover Vincent has taken delivery of a large amount of drugs, but he tells her that it is so he can set up Phil by planting them in his house as revenge for his father, Eric (George Russo), killing Vincent's father, Henry. Vincent tells Kim how this happened, and Claudette confirms it, but convinces Kim not to tell anyone. When Phil deliberately scares Kim, Kim and Sharon attempt to end the feud and with Ronnie's help, Phil and Vincent agree. However, Phil later kidnaps Pearl from the house, and Vincent refuses to call the police, instead revealing he has a gun and will end it his own way. However, it soon emerges that Claudette killed Henry, not Eric, and Kim is reunited with Pearl.

Kim and Claudette clash at Pearl's first birthday party, and when Claudette's foster son Linford Short (Leon Lopez) announces that she is a finalist in the Pride of Walford Awards, Kim tries to take the attention away by jumping on Pearl's bouncy castle, which Claudette then punctures; Denise tells Kim that Claudette did this deliberately. Kim is horrified when Donna decides she wants Vincent to be a sperm donor so she can have a baby, but Vincent convinces her it is the right thing to do, however, it does not work and Donna changes her mind. When Kim finds out that Denise is pregnant but wants the baby adopted, Kim decides she and Vincent should adopt the child, but Denise is against this. Vincent discovers that Kim has received a parking fine in his car for parking in a bus lane; she discovers that Donna has a disabled parking permit so Kim uses Claudette as a way into Donna's flat and steals the permit to go shopping. Vincent discovers this and tells Donna, who tells her it is wrong; Patrick reveals Kim has never passed her driving test so Vincent bans her from driving his car. Vincent then gives Kim driving lessons, but she is angry that people are taking bets on whether she will pass or fail her test. She also worries when Denise does not want to tell her daughters that she is pregnant; Kim tells Libby, prompting her return to Walford. She passes her driving test but breaks her arm, so she is annoyed that she is unable to drive. Kim and Vincent travel to Montserrat and Denise is upset to learn that Kim has told their mother, Emerald Fox (Doña Croll), that Denise is pregnant. Denise gives birth to a boy, but Kim becomes angry when she discovers that Denise still plans to have her son adopted and tries to reason with her. Denise refuses to change her mind, so Kim brands her a "cold-hearted bitch". Vincent comforts Kim but advises her to accept and respect Denise's decision otherwise she would lose her sister, however, Kim stands by her own decision and decides to cut all ties with Denise. When Denise survives a bus crash, Denise rejects Kim's support. Kim throws Emerald a farewell dinner and invites Denise but Emerald and Patrick suspect that she has planned it for the same time as Denise's class to make her look bad. Kim embarrasses Denise by interrupting her class and revealing that Denise abandoned her son. An angry but defiant Denise eventually goes to the dinner but confronts Kim, telling her that she realises that Kim still sees Denise as a mother and fears being abandoned by her. At Emerald's leaving party, Kim and Denise stand up for each other against Emerald when she criticises Kim's parenting, and when Kim says she is thankful for her sister, Emerald declares that they are not really sisters, explaining that Denise was brought to her as a baby. This causes Kim and Denise to reunite. After learning that Denise's friends know the identity of her son's biological father, Kim decides to find out the truth herself, concluding that Denise's former fiancé Ian Beale (Adam Woodyatt) is the father. Kim confronts Ian but his wife Jane Beale (Laurie Brett) informs her that he has had a vasectomy so cannot father any more children. Denise eventually tells Kim that Phil is the father, which shocks Kim; Denise begs her not to tell anyone. When Kush Kazemi (Davood Ghadami) suffers a cardiac arrest, Kim assists Sonia Fowler (Natalie Cassidy), who performs CPR. Kim is interviewed by a local radio station and plans to use the opportunity to advertise The Albert, but changes her mind after seeing Ian, who has lost his son and business in a fire.

Kim thinks she has food poisoning but later finds out she is being sick because she is pregnant. She tells Vincent but he refuses to show interest of the idea of having another child, which hurts and confuses Kim, but they later are both excited by this. However, Kim suffers a miscarriage, which devastates her. She continues to pretend she is pregnant and tries to get pregnant but this fails and she eventually tells Denise and Carmel Kazemi (Bonnie Langford) the truth. After much consideration, Kim decides to have a DNA test to confirm whether she and Denise really are sisters. The DNA results confirm that Kim and Denise are in fact biological sisters, and that had Emerald lied to them out of spite. Kim suspects Vincent is cheating on her but he is selling The Albert, which he has been forced to do by Aidan Maguire (Patrick Bergin). Aidan buys it from Vincent for £1, and Kim discovers that she and Vincent risk losing their home due to Vincent's loss of income. Vincent decides to return to his police informant days, offering information on the heist in return for cash. However, Phil discovers Vincent is talking to the police and has a corrupt officer threaten Vincent. Vincent disappears and Kim is forced to move in with Denise and get a job at the Minute Mart. While searching for Vincent, Kim collapses and is informed that she is pregnant again. Her search for Vincent becomes desperate as she wants him to have a role in their baby's life, however Phil continues to warn Kim and Denise that pursuing Vincent is dangerous. On Christmas Eve 2018, Phil and Kim find themselves locked in the staff room of the Minute Mart during an argument over Vincent, only for Kim to go into labour. Phil is forced to deliver Kim's baby son, who she decides to name Mica.

== The B&B ==
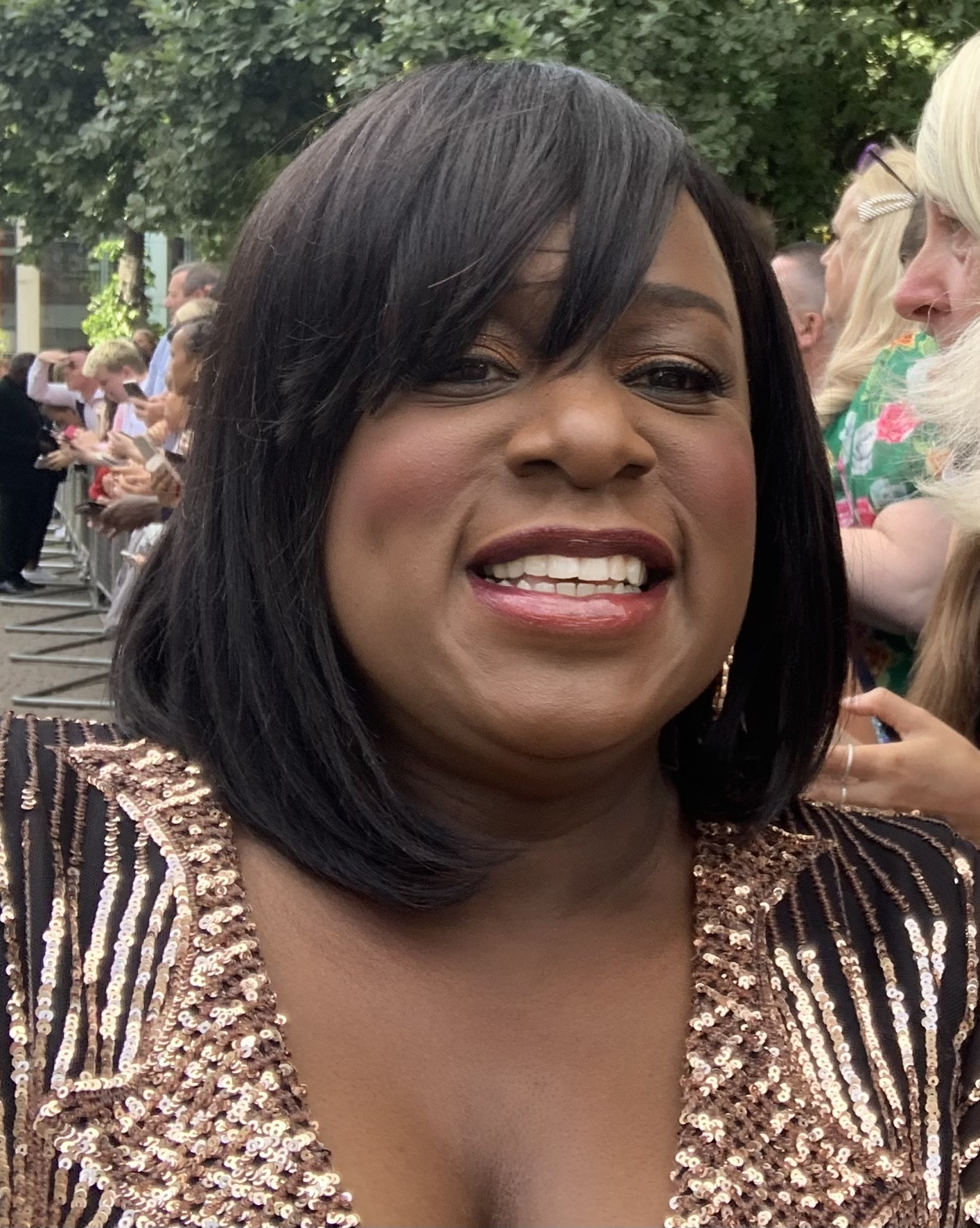
Tameka Empson (pictured) wrote the whole of "The B&B", the spin-off given to her character, Kim.

The B&B (also called The B&B – Kim's Palace) is a mock–documentary focussing on Kim and her life running her bed and breakfast. There have been four episodes, plus one video featuring outtakes. Empson wrote the entire series, which was produced by Matt Taylor. Kim's sister Denise features in two of the episodes, and Lorna Sinclair plays a B&B guest in the third episode. The official synopsis says: "A camera crew is given access to all areas of 'Kim's Palace'. The team focus on her adventures (and mishaps) as she strives to raise her small business from the ashes of disaster, catapulting her into the realm of the Alan Sugars and Richard Bransons of this world. With Kim at the helm, surely nothing can go wrong. Can it?! Watch this space..." Empson revealed in an interview with Digital Spy that she came up with the idea for the spin-off when she was on set thinking that the B&B should be used more, and more people should be seen staying there, but as most regular characters have their own homes, Empson though of a "behind-the-scenes" look at the B&B. Bryan Kirkwood was EastEnders' executive producer at the time, and Empson had heard the B&B would be burnt down, but she was reassured that it would be refurbished. Lorraine Newman took over from Kirkwood and agreed to Empson's idea. Empson worked with the EastEnders web team to create the series, and they wanted it to be shorter than she did, so her scripts were edited but all her jokes were kept. Empson said of the series: "It's still EastEnders, but at the same time it's going to be its own show. It's a standalone thing and Kim is showing how to run a successful business. She thinks that she's a bit like Hilary Devey, but she would give Hilary Devey a run for her money! It's a bit of Dragons' Den, a bit of The Apprentice and The Hotel Inspector all rolled into one."

No.	Title	Length	Original release date
1	"Do Not Disturb"	8m 58s	12 October 2012
Kim attempts to contact a guest who is locked in their room.
2	"The Deadline"	9m 31s	19 October 2012
Kim has to sign and return her insurance forms by 5pm.
3	"Sunny Side Up"	5m 2s	26 October 2012
A guest has requested an egg "sunny side up" but Kim has other ideas.
4	"Branching Out"	10m 35s	2 November 2012
Kim wants to expand her business empire.
5	"The Outtakes"	3m 6s	14 November 2012
Outtakes from filming.

== Reception ==
Daniel Maier from The Guardian criticised Kim's B&B, saying, "There's been a [...] futile relaunch afoot in EastEnders, in which the B&B has reopened as Kimberley's Palace. Who stays there? Really, though? Tourists? Escaped convicts? Delegates for Whelk 2011, Europe's leading mollusc expo at Walford International Conference Centre? By the look of it, the place is actually a holding pen for characters who are "between homes" within Albert Square's hermetically sealed biosphere.

Ruth Deller from Lowculture praised Kim on her guest appearance in 2009 saying, "Denise Johnson's sister, Kim, has only been in the show five minutes and has already stolen the limelight big style. Tameka [Empson] is a joy in everything she appears in and she was the only thing that made those terrible wedding episodes worth watching. A new Aunt Sal type recurring character, perhaps? She's a much more interesting prospect than yet another new Mitchell/Branning/Slater/etc, though I'd fear for her if she was made a permanent fixture and had to complete the obligatory Phil Mitchell shagging initiation ritual. Some people are just too good for all that nonsense". Deller later praised Kim when she had returned saying, "It's widely acknowledged that EastEnders can't do comedy very well, but that's only because it tries to do comedy the way Coronation Street or Neighbours do, which just won't wash in Britain's most miserable postcode. What it can do is provide characters who offer some light relief to the show, whilst still functioning (just about) as believable human beings. Kim Fox is one such character—a big, ballsy, whirlwind, she brings a sense of fabulousness to all her scenes and works well as the kind of character that can sympathise with those going through the usual Walford misery whilst encouraging them to embrace their inner fag/hag. Cherish her before she succumbs to the inevitable marriage to Phil/Ian/Max/Whoever."

Empson received a nomination in the "Best Comedy Performance" category at the British Soap Awards 2011, 2012, 2015, 2016 and 2017 for her portrayal of Kim. She later won "Funniest Performance" at the 2011 Inside Soap Awards. Of her win, she said "It feels amazing. All those days in the bedroom practising with the hairbrush, now I've finally got my award and it feels great." In October 2011, Empson was nominated for one award, at the Screen Nation Awards which celebrate the best British Black talent. She was nominated for the Favourite Female TV Star. In August 2017, Empson was longlisted for Funniest Female at the Inside Soap Awards. She made the viewer-voted shortlist, but lost out to Dolly-Rose Campbell, who portrays Gemma Winter in Coronation Street. That same year, Empson was longlisted for "Funniest Performance" for the Inside Soap Awards. She was later longlisted for "Best Comic Performance" at the 2024 Inside Soap Awards. She was also longlisted for the same award at the 2025 Inside Soap Awards.

Claire Crick of All About Soap said "Blimey, that Kim Fox is a feisty one isn't she?" She said that Kim has a good "right hook" and said that Kim and Ray should just get together as soon as possible. Lucy Mangan of The Guardian said that Kim "walks and talks like an actual warm, funny, normal person", adding that she "has dropped into Walford like manna-with-comedy-chops from heaven". Mangan also said that Kim "moves across [Albert Square] like a shaft of sunlight, piercing the gloom. She laughs. She cracks jokes. She is warm, funny, vivacious and we must enjoy her while we can. Because eventually the dank, fetid air of Walford will poison her lungs and the cold, clammy hand of 'Enders-doom will lay itself upon her soul and quieten it forever."

In 2020, Sara Wallis and Ian Hyland from The Daily Mirror placed Kim 79th on their ranked list of the best EastEnders characters of all time, writing that she is "big hearted with a big mouth to match" and that she "brings much-needed comic relief". Marianna Manson from Closer Online called Kim "hilarious" and opined that the soap would not be the same without her or Denise.

== See also ==
- List of EastEnders: E20 characters
