= Tameka Empson =

English actress and comedian (born 1977)

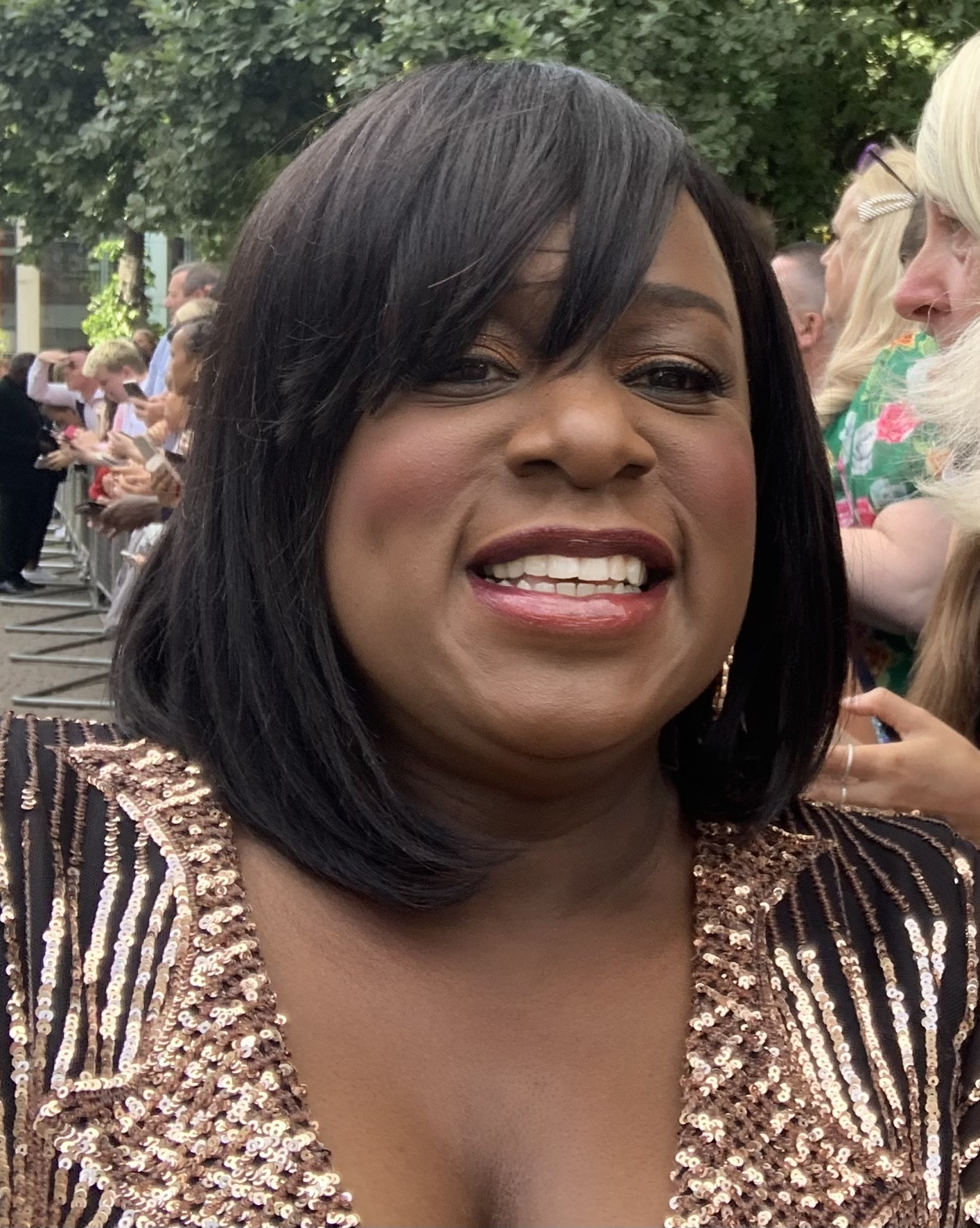
- Empson in 2022
- Born: Tameka Lydia Empson; 15 April 1977 (age 49); London, England
- Occupations: Actress; comedian
- Years active: 1996–present
- Notable work: 3 Non-Blondes; Beautiful Thing; Beautiful People; EastEnders; The Celebrity Traitors
- Children: 2

Tameka Lydia Empson (born 15 April 1977) is an English actress and comedian. She appeared as one of the three protagonists in the hidden-camera comedy sketch show 3 Non-Blondes. In 2009, she began playing Kim Fox in the BBC soap opera EastEnders.

== Career ==
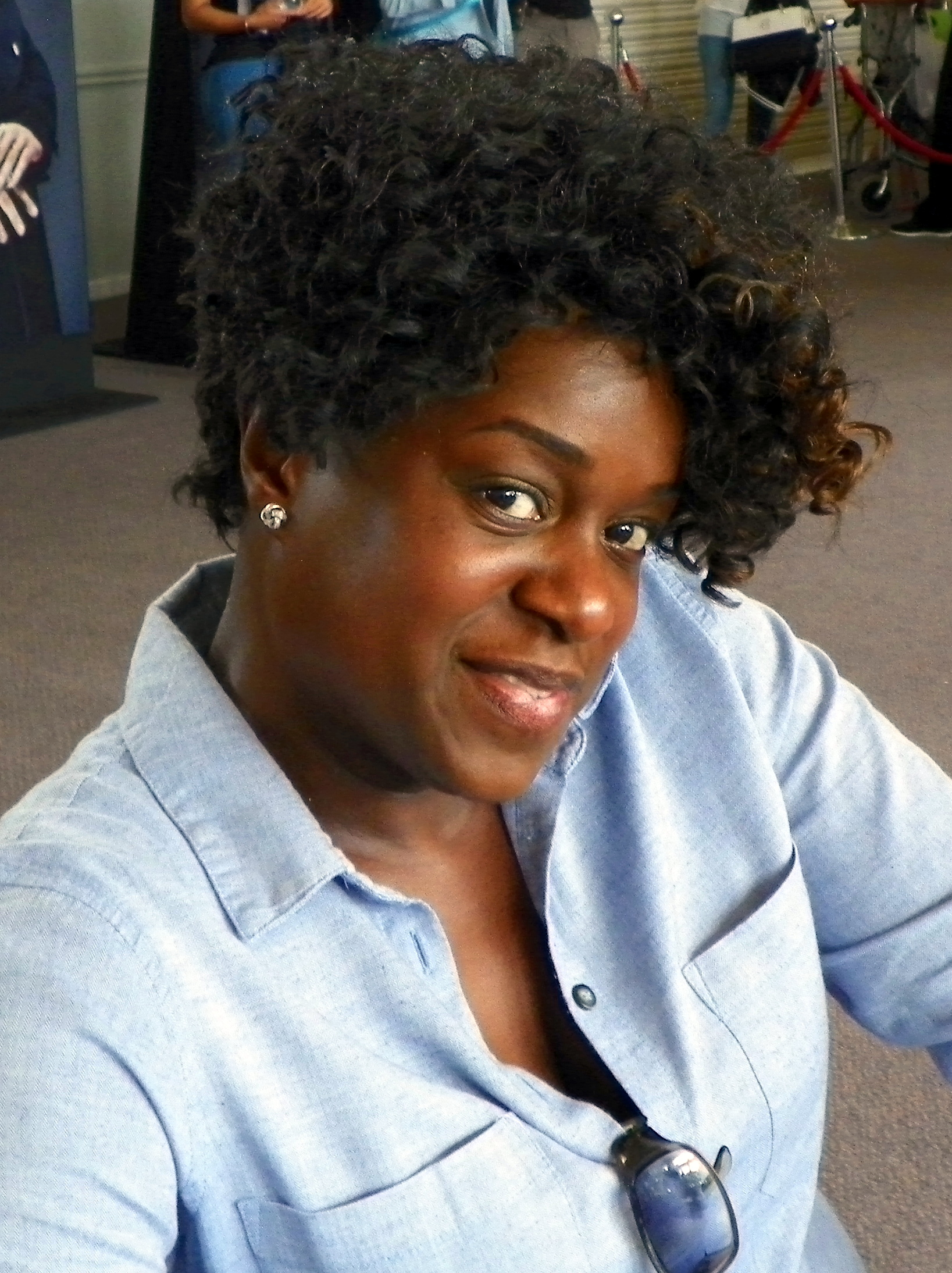
Empson at the EastEnders Meet and Greet event in 2016

As well as her television work, Empson has appeared in a number of films. In 1996, she appeared in the film Beautiful Thing as Leah Russell, the next-door neighbour of the main characters. Empson worked alongside Linda Henry, both of whom would eventually join the cast of EastEnders; in 1998 she appeared as the love rival to the main character in the film Babymother. Empson is an experienced theatre actress having performed as Billie in the original cast of Our House, a musical featuring songs from the ska/pop band Madness, which premiered at The Cambridge Theatre in October 2002 and ran on until August 2003. She has since been a mainstay of the Hackney Empire annual pantomimes.

In 2008, Empson appeared in the BBC sitcom Beautiful People and in the ITV1 thriller Whitechapel. In 2009, she joined the cast of EastEnders, playing Kim Fox, the half-sister of Denise Fox (Diane Parish). As a result, she has won several awards including an Inside Soap award in 2012 for "Funniest Female Performance". She took maternity leave from EastEnders and returned to screens August 2014. On 16 July 2019, it was announced that Empson would be temporarily leaving the series, with her return set to air in 2020. Empson confirmed on Loose Women that the break was her maternity leave for her second child, and that she did not deliberately keep it a secret, but that she "just wanted to enjoy it".

Empson is a regular performer at the Hackney Empire starring in the theatre's annual pantomime since 2004; she has also starred in Anansi and the Magic Mirror and has a live sketch and comedy show (The Kat and Tameka Show) with Choice FM DJ Kat B. She has also voiced Tickbird in Tinga Tinga Tales, and Jojo's mother in the series JoJo & Gran Gran. On 22 August 2016, Empson was revealed as a contestant participating on the fourteenth series of Strictly Come Dancing. She was partnered with professional dancer Gorka Márquez. They were the second couple to leave the competition. In 2019, she appeared on Comic Relief Does The Apprentice to raise money for Comic Relief. Later that year, she appeared as a panellist on The Apprentice: You're Fired!, and voiced the role of Pearl the Police Horse on the Disney Channel series 101 Dalmatian Street.

In 2025, Empson appeared as a contestant on the first series of The Celebrity Traitors. Empson competed as a Faithful but was ultimately the second player to be banished in episode 4. When asked how she would summarise her experience on the Traitors in three words she said, "Amazing. Stressful. Brilliant.".

Empson was awarded the Honorary Game Changer Award by the Comedy Women in Print Prize in 2025, "in recognition of Tameka’s work which sits across all areas of comedic input from writing, curating a TV series, comedic acting and ‘being herself’ but always with wit at the forefront."

== Filmography ==
- 2025: The Celebrity Traitors – Herself / Contestant / Series 1
- 2019: 101 Dalmatian Street – Pearl the Police Horse
- 2016: Strictly Come Dancing – Participant
- 2014: Lily's Driftwood Bay – Hatsie (2014)
- 2011: EastEnders: E20 – Kim Fox
- 2010: StreetDance 3D – Sharonda
- 2009: EastEnders – Kim Fox (Regular role, 2009–present)
- 2008: Beautiful People – Tameka/Johoyo (6 episodes, 2008–2009)
- 2009: Skellig – Nurse 1
- 2009: Whitechapel – Mrs. Buki (3 episodes, 2009)
- 2007: Learners – Gloria
- 2007: MI High - Sergeant Raynor
- 2006: Notes on a Scandal – Antonia Robinson
- 2003: 3 Non-Blondes – Herself
- 2002: Babyfather – Sherene (3 episodes, 2002)
- 2002: Silent Cry – Hairdresser
- 2002: Out of the Game – Karen
- 2002: Long Time Dead – Girl student
- 2001: The Martins – Mo
- 2001: Lava – Maxine
- 2001: Sam's Game – Marcia (6 episodes, 2001)
- 2001: Goodbye Charlie Bright – Kay
- 1998: Babymother – Dionne – her rival
- 1998: I Want You – Cut Ear Salon Woman
- 1997: Food of Love – Alice
- 1996: Beautiful Thing – Leah Russell

== Awards and nominations ==
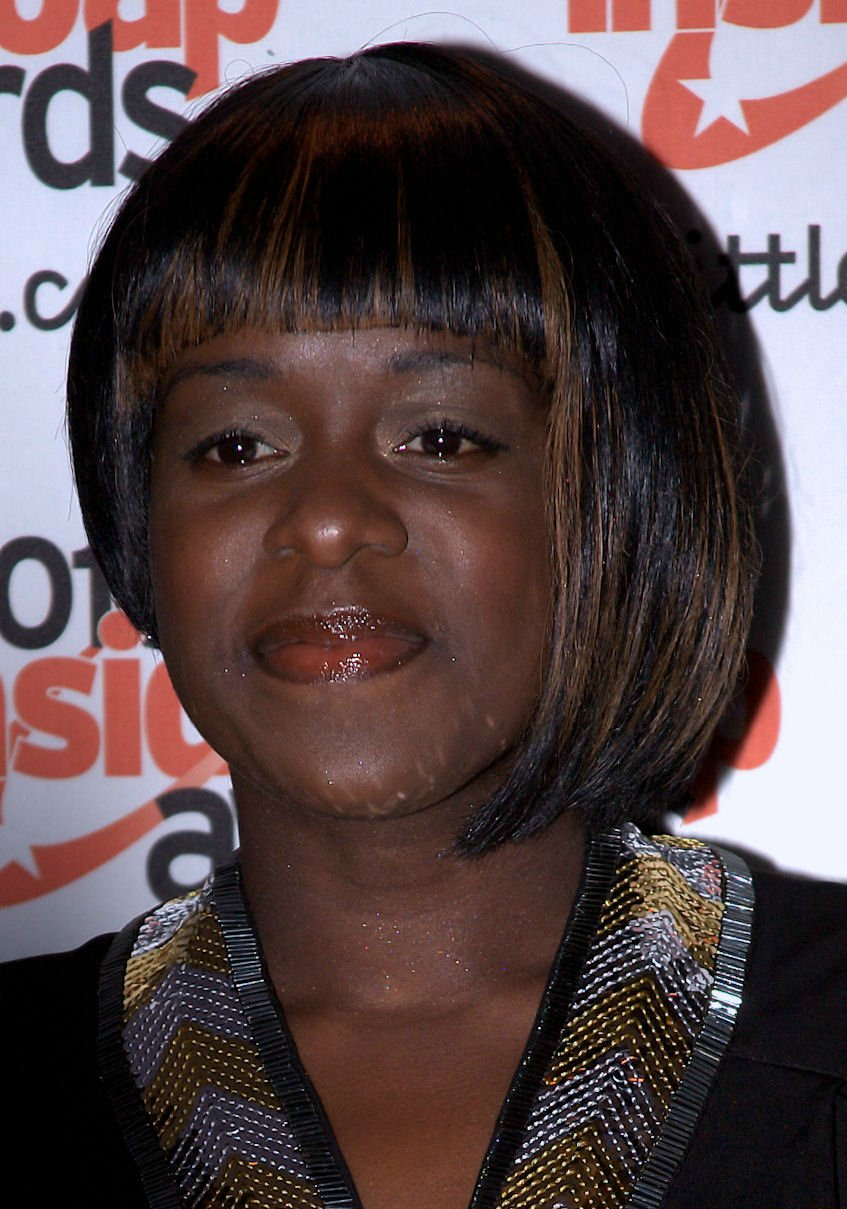
Empson at the Inside Soap Awards in 2010

Year	Award	Category	Result	Ref.
2011	The British Soap Awards	Best Comedy Performance	Nominated	
2011	Inside Soap Awards	Funniest Performance	Won	
2012	British Soap Awards	Best Comedy Performance	Nominated	
2012	Inside Soap Awards	Funniest Female	Won	
2013	Inside Soap Awards	Funniest Female	Won	
2014	Inside Soap Awards	Funniest Female	Shortlisted	
2015	British Soap Awards	Best Comedy Performance	Nominated	
2015	TV Choice Awards	Best Soap Actress	Nominated	
2015	Inside Soap Awards	Funniest Female	Won	
2016	British Soap Awards	Best Comedy Performance	Nominated	
2016	Inside Soap Awards	Funniest Female	Won	
2017	2017 British Soap Awards	Best Comedy Performance	Nominated	
2017	Inside Soap Awards	Funniest Female	Shortlisted	
2018	Inside Soap Awards	Funniest Female	Shortlisted	
2019	2019 British Soap Awards	Best Comedy Performance	Nominated	
2019	Inside Soap Awards	Funniest Female	Nominated	
2021	Inside Soap Awards	Funniest Performance	Nominated	
2021	I Talk Telly Awards	Best Soap Partnership (with Diane Parish)	Nominated	
2022	2022 British Soap Awards	Best Comedy Performance	Won	
2022	Inside Soap Awards	Best Comic Performance	Shortlisted	
2022	I Talk Telly Awards	Best Soap Partnership (with Delroy Atkinson)	Nominated	
2023	TVTimes Awards	Favourite Soap Actor	Nominated	
2023	I Talk Telly Awards	Best Soap Partnership (with Atkinson)	Nominated	
2025	Comedy Women in Print Prize	Honorary Game Changer Award	Won	
