= Priya Davdra =

British actress (b. 1987)

- Born: Priya Davdra; 12 April 1987 (age 39); London, England
- Education: International School of Screen Acting
- Occupation: Actress
- Years active: 2016–present
- Television: EastEnders

Priya Davdra (born 12 April 1987) is an English actress. She is known for her role as Iqra Ahmed in the BBC soap opera EastEnders (2019–2022), the first Muslim lesbian character to appear on the show. She has since starred in the ITVX horror comedy series Count Abdulla (2023).

== Early life ==
Davdra was born on 12 April 1987 in London, England. Davdra is British of Indian Gujarati descent and Hindu heritage. After leaving school, Davdra initially pursued a career in banking, a job she stayed in until the age of 30. From 2016 to 2017, she attended the International School of Screen Acting.

== Career ==
While at drama school, Davdra made her professional acting career in the feature film Naan Yaar as lead role Shivani in 2016. Then in 2017, she appeared in a short film titled The Chapati Flower and an internet advertisement for Think. After making guest appearances in various projects, Davdra was cast as a series regular in the BBC soap opera EastEnders in December 2018. She made her first appearance as Iqra Ahmed on 19 February 2019. Davdra's character was involved in a coming out storyline where she became the first Muslim lesbian to appear on EastEnders. Davdra made her final appearance as Iqra in January 2022. In 2023, she was cast in the ITVX horror comedy series Count Abdulla.

== Filmography ==
Year	Title	Role	Notes	Ref.
2016	Naan Yaar	Shivani	Film	
2017	The Chapati Flower	Rani	Short film	
2017	Think	Driver	Advertisement	
2018	Hitman 2	Karisma Haasan, Sinhi "Akka" Venthan, various NPCs (voices)	Video game	
2018	The Colour of Milk	Jaswinder	Short film	
2018	Macquarie Bank	Brooke	Advertisement	
2019–2022	EastEnders	Iqra Ahmed	Regular role	
2023	Count Abdulla	Simran	Main role	
2024	Queenie	Noor Malik	Episode: "New Year, Old Problems"	
