= Battle for Earth =

Battle for Earth or Battle of Earth may refer to:

- Alien invasion
- Transformers: Battle for Earth, a book in the Transformers franchise.
- Marvel Avengers: Battle for Earth, a 2012 motion-controlled fighting video game.
- Planet of the Apemen: Battle for Earth, a 2011 BBC documentary.
- Maelstrom: The Battle for Earth Begins, a 2007 real-time strategy game.
- Godzilla vs. Mothra, or Godzilla and Mothra: The Battle for Earth, a 1992 Japanese kaiju film.
- Battle for Terra, a 2007 animated science fiction film.
- Battle for Earth (Wing Commander), a fictional event in the Wing Commander novel series.
- "Episode 3: The Battle for Earth", a level in the 2011 video game DC Universe Online.
- Battle of Earth (Marvel Cinematic Universe), a fictional event depicted in the 2019 film Avengers: Endgame.
