= List of EastEnders characters introduced in 2014 =

EastEnders logo

EastEnders is a BBC soap opera that first aired on 19 February 1985. The following is a list of characters that first appeared in 2019, in order of first appearance. All new characters in 2014 were introduced by executive producer Dominic Treadwell-Collins. Nancy Carter (Maddy Hill) arrived in January with her fiancé, Wayne Ladlow (Malachi Kirby), Stan Carter (Timothy West), Babe Smith (Annette Badland) and new market inspector, Aleks Shirovs (Kristian Kiehling). February saw Stacey Branning (Lacey Turner) return with her daughter Lily (Aine Garvey) and also her new boyfriend, Luke Riley (Matt Willis), followed by Tosh Mackintosh (Rebecca Scroggs). On 10 March, Charlie Cotton (Declan Bennett) and on 4 April, Lee Carter (Danny Hatchard). Donna Yates (Lisa Hammond), a new market stallholder and Pam Coker (Lin Blakley), Les Coker's (Roger Sloman) wife, both arrived on 14 April. DC Emma Summerhayes (Anna Acton) was introduced on 21 April, as the Police Family Liaison Officer for the Beales after Lucy Beale (Hetti Bywater) is murdered. Yvonne Cotton (Pauline McLynn) made her debut on 12 May. Kat Moon (Jessie Wallace) and Alfie Moon's (Shane Richie) twins, Bert and Ernie Moon, arrived in August, as did Beth Williams, the daughter of teenagers Cindy Williams (Mimi Keene) and TJ Spraggan (George Sargeant). Elaine Peacock (Maria Friedman) appeared from 14 October as Linda Carter's (Kellie Bright) mother and Kush Kazemi (Davood Ghadami) first appeared on 20 October. Buster Briggs (Karl Howman) made his first appearance on 18 November and Sylvie Carter (Linda Marlowe) made her first appearance on 11 December.

== Nancy Carter ==
Nancy Carter, played by Maddy Hill, is the daughter of Mick Carter (Danny Dyer) and Linda Carter (Kellie Bright). She made her first appearance on 1 January 2014 when about to marry Wayne Ladlow (Malachi Kirby) in Watford. Wayne is instantly disliked by Mick who carries the intended bride over his shoulder to their family-owned pub, The Queen Victoria where Nancy will live. Nancy continues to see Wayne in Walford. Nancy departed from the serial on 22 April 2016. She returned five years later in 2021. She then left unannounced on 23 June 2022.

== Wayne Ladlow ==
Wayne Ladlow
- EastEnders character
- Portrayed by: Malachi Kirby
- First appearance: Episode 4775/4776; 1 January 2014
- Last appearance: Episode 4791; 23 January 2014
- Introduced by: Dominic Treadwell-Collins
In-universe information
- Sisters: Chanelle Ladlow

Wayne Ladlow, played by Malachi Kirby, appears in episodes first broadcast in the UK between 1 and 23 January 2014. He is Nancy Carter's (Maddy Hill) fiancé and first appears at his wedding to Nancy. Her parents Mick (Danny Dyer) and Linda Carter (Kellie Bright) arrive, and Mick dislikes the fact that Nancy is marrying Wayne so much that he picks her up and carries her out. Nancy's brother Johnny Carter (Sam Strike) locks the remaining guests inside the community centre where the wedding is taking place. Wayne soon arrives in Walford where he and Nancy resume their relationship in secret. Wayne stays in the local bed and breakfast, and flirts heavily with some of Walford's other women, including Denise Fox (Diane Parish). Mick hires Wayne to fix a damp problem in The Queen Victoria public house, but while he is doing the job Nancy discovers he has been showing private pictures of her to other boys in the pub, leading to her humiliating Wayne by showing everyone similar pictures of him. An angry Wayne then leaves Walford.

Inside Soap reported that Nancy's parents Mick and Linda hate Wayne, and called him "feckless". Dyer said that Nancy is probably planning to marry him just to rebel against Linda. Hill opined that Wayne's exit scenes were "too satisfying to film". She said, "Nancy's not too bothered about Wayne at this point. She knows her parents don't like him so Nancy was basically just vying for their attention. In any case, I think that Nancy's always known she was too bright for Wayne".

== Aleks Shirovs ==
Aleks Shirovs, played by Kristian Kiehling, made his first appearance on 24 January 2014. Kiehling auditioned for the role and said he was "so excited" when he learned he had won the role. Of his casting, Kiehling told from Digital Spy, "I'm very glad to be here. First of all I was thrilled and terrified to be joining the show! I was thrilled because it's a great honour for me to be here, but then terrified because Britain is a country of such great talent in terms of directors and actors, so it was overwhelming." On 16 April 2015, Treadwell-Collins confirmed that Kiehling had left the show. Commenting on the decision of his departure, Kiehling said: "Well that's a tricky one! Let's put it this way, we negotiated a new contract but we couldn't come to an agreement. I did get the hint that I would always be welcome back, so I can only say that I would be honoured if the situation arises and I get a second invitation. Never say never!" Kiehling was nominated for Best Bad Boy at the Inside Soap Awards in 2014 for his portrayal as Aleks.

== Stan Carter ==
Stan Carter, played by Timothy West, is the father of Shirley (Linda Henry) and Tina (Luisa Bradshaw-White), and the grandfather of Mick Carter (Danny Dyer), although Mick believes Stan to be his father. He made his first screen appearance on 27 January 2014. The character and casting were announced on 12 December 2013, when West commented, "I am excited to be joining EastEnders for the first time. Stan is a wonderful character and I look forward to seeing what is going to happen to him." Stan is characterised as a retired Billingsgate fishmonger, who is "delighted" to be around his children again, as he has been lonely since his wife left him 30 years ago. Stan has been billed as "opinionated and curmudgeonly", and having a manipulative side. A spokesperson said, "Stan is no fluffy old man in a cardigan, and it won't be long before he starts manipulating the whole Carter clan from the comfort of his armchair." On 5 October 2014 it was announced that West had decided to leave EastEnders. On 19 February 2015, it was revealed that West had already filmed his final scenes, and he departed in the episode broadcast on 10 April 2015 when his character dies following his battle with terminal prostate cancer.

== Babe Smith ==
Babe Smith (also known as Aunt Babe) played by Annette Badland, is the maternal aunt of Shirley Carter (Linda Henry) and Tina Carter (Luisa Bradshaw-White), and great-aunt of Mick Carter (Danny Dyer). The character and casting were announced on 12 December 2013. Babe's first on-screen appearance was on 31 January 2014. On 18 September 2016, it was announced that Babe had been axed from the serial by the new executive producer Sean O'Connor and the character and Badland would depart EastEnders in early 2017. She made her final appearance on 9 February 2017.

== Luke Riley ==
Luke Riley
- EastEnders character
- Portrayed by: Matt Willis
- First appearance: Episode 4802; 13 February 2014
- Last appearance: Episode 4811; 27 February 2014
- Introduced by: Dominic Treadwell-Collins

Luke Riley, played by Matt Willis, is the boyfriend of Stacey Branning (Lacey Turner), who returned to EastEnders in February 2014 after an absence of three years.

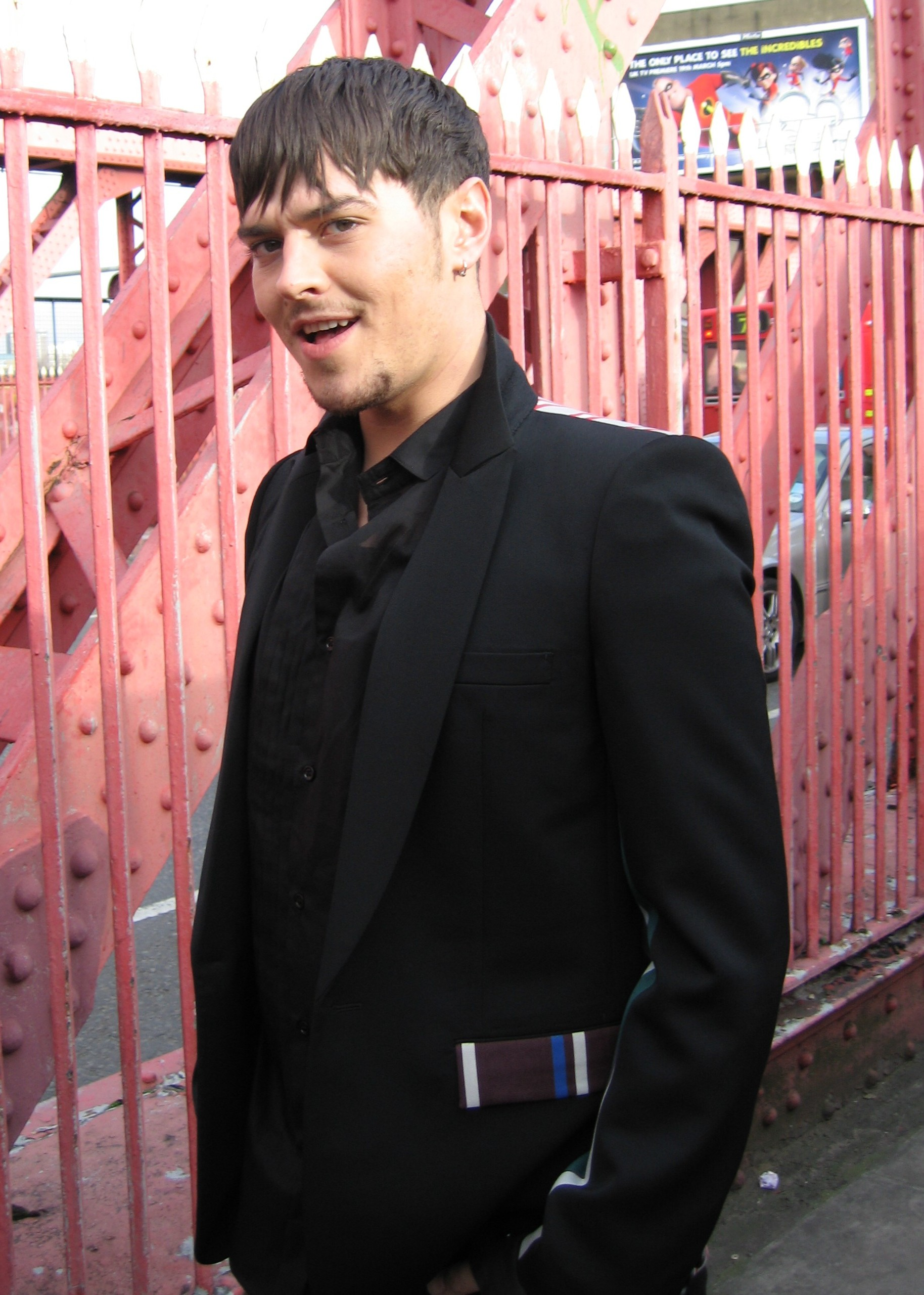
Busted band member Matt Willis portrayed the character.

When Kat Moon (Jessie Wallace) sees Stacey from the top of a bus in central London after three years thinking Stacey was living in Mexico, she enlists the help of Max Branning (Jake Wood) to find her. Eventually tracking her down to a flat in West London, she meets Luke, who is revealed to be Stacey's long-term boyfriend. However, he has no idea of Stacey's past life, including the fact she was responsible for the murder of Archie Mitchell (Larry Lamb), and believes she is called Jenny Smith. Kat pretends to be the cleaner Luke and Stacey have hired, but when he works out she is an imposter, she flees believing he will call the police. Stacey convinces Luke not to involve the police before visiting Kat, where she realises she cannot keep living a lie with Luke. After briefly fleeing, she returns to Luke, who has since discovered who she really is from Kat. He ends the relationship and she returns to Walford to live with Kat, but continues to leave messages for Luke in an attempt to reconcile with him. Realising he still loves Stacey, he visits Walford and meets Kat's husband, Alfie Moon (Shane Richie). Luke is appalled when he hears that Stacey killed Archie and flees, leaving Stacey heartbroken.

Luke is described as ambitious and is said to be "deeply in love" with Stacey. Willis said of his casting, which was announced on 19 December 2013: "I am so thrilled to be a part of such an iconic show. I grew up watching EastEnders so this is really exciting for me!" Executive producer Dominic Treadwell-Collins added: "I've always loved Matt and it will be a real treat for viewers to watch him and Lacey together on screen as part of her return to the Square. Luke gives as good as he gets, so is a great foil to Stacey. Pity she's been lying to him since the day she met him..." Willis started filming his role in December 2013. EastEnders confirmed on Twitter that Willis would be joining for "a short stint".

== Tosh Mackintosh ==
Tosh Mackintosh
- EastEnders character
- Portrayed by: Rebecca Scroggs
- First appearance: Episode 4810; 25 February 2014
- Last appearance: Episode 4974; 11 December 2014
- Introduced by: Dominic Treadwell-Collins
In-universe information
- Occupation: Fire fighter
- Mother: Judy Mackintosh
- Sisters: Faith Mackintosh

Fiona "Tosh" Mackintosh, played by Rebecca Scroggs, made her first screen appearance on 25 February 2014. The character and casting was announced on 9 February 2014. Tosh is the actress's first major television role. Of joining the show, Scroggs commented "I'm very excited to be joining EastEnders in my first major television role. I grew up watching the show and it feels amazing to actually be a part of it now! I'm really going to enjoy working with the Carter family, they've brought such great energy to the Square." Tosh is Tina Carter's (Luisa Bradshaw-White) former girlfriend. She comes to Walford to see Tina and try and work on their relationship. Tosh is a firefighter who is as billed "as strong, feisty and bright". It was reported in 2014 that Tosh would leave the soap permanently. The character departed the show on 11 December 2014.

After arguing with her sister Shirley Carter (Linda Henry), Tina decides to reconnect with Tosh after realising that she still views Tosh as "a loved one". She brings Tosh to a family dinner, where she instantly clashes with Shirley, who knows that Tosh can be violent and previously beat Tina when they were together, while befriending Tina's sister-in-law Linda Carter (Kellie Bright). Shirley visits Tosh at the fire station to warn her to stay away from Tina, but is humiliated by the firefighter who soaks her using a fire hose. Still determined to stop Tina from seeing Tosh, Shirley locks her in the upstairs lounge of The Queen Victoria pub, but Tosh rescues Tina with a fire ladder. As they prepare to spend some time together as a couple, Tina is called to help Cindy Williams (Mimi Keene) who has drunk herself paralytic despite being pregnant. Tosh, unwilling to give up her time off, leaves Tina to deal with the situation alone.

Tosh later feels insecure about Tina's friendship with Roxy Mitchell (Rita Simons) despite the fact that she is not a lesbian. In late April 2014, Tosh and Tina agree to spend the night in town. but Tina is caught up with her friend Sonia Fowler (Natalie Cassidy), and tells Tosh to leave without her. The following day, Tosh shouts at Tina in The Queen Vic and is told to leave by Shirley. She later talks to Aleks Shirovs (Kristian Kiehling) in The Vic, and they come to a decision that Tosh will move in with him and fellow flatmate Jake Stone (Jamie Lomas), which delights Tina. Later on, Tina also moves in with them. Tosh overhears Sonia and her half-sister Bianca Butcher (Patsy Palmer) talking about a kiss between Tina and Sonia. She is furious with Tina and confronts her, leading to her knocking Tina's head against the door frame. The pair later reconcile and decide to start a family together. Desperate for cash to fund IVF treatment, Tina starts dealing her aunt Babe Smith's (Annette Badland) drugs. Tosh discovers this and struggles to trust Tina again, but eventually forgives her. They choose a sperm donor, and Tosh is inseminated though she worries that their child will not know its father.

She becomes pregnant, news which they share with Tina's supportive family. When Alfie Moon's (Shane Richie) house is burnt to the ground, Tosh actively stops people from entering the fire. She later reveals to Tina she has miscarried, but plans to try for another baby. She becomes suspicious that Alfie started the fire himself as insurance fraud, and shares her belief with the fire investigation officer before going to the police, despite Tina's brother Mick Carter (Danny Dyer) actively trying to stop her, aware that her suspicions are correct but knowing Alfie's actions were out of desperation. Afterwards, when a drunk Dean approaches Tosh and offers to be a donor for her and Tina's baby, they agree on the condition of not telling Tina; however, the next day at Sharon and Phil's wedding, Tosh confesses to Tina about Dean and she is furious. Tina later forgives her, when Tosh discovers she is not pregnant, she punches Tina after accusing her of not being supportive. Tosh becomes paranoid that Tina is having an affair with Sonia when she helps her through body image issues, and she finds Sonia's watch in the flat. She confronts Tina and viciously beats her. Afterwards, she tries to apologise but Tina rejects her, telling her to take a job and a new flat in Croydon. Tosh then leaves Walford, after telling Tina that she was the best thing that ever happened to her.

== Charlie Cotton ==
Charlie Cotton, played by Declan Bennett, is the grandson of Dot Branning (June Brown) and the eldest son of Nick Cotton (John Altman). The character first appeared on 10 March 2014. Notable stories included his relationship and marriage to Ronnie Mitchell (Samantha Womack), and the birth of his son Matthew Mitchell Cotton. Bennett, and Charlie, left the show in September 2015, after being ordered to leave Walford by Vincent Hubbard (Richard Blackwood). In 2017, Bennett reprised the role for guest stints between 5 May and 15 December.

== Lee Carter ==
Lee Carter
- EastEnders character
- Portrayed by: Danny Hatchard
- Duration: 2014–2017, 2019–2020, 2024, 2026
- First appearance: Episode 4832; 4 April 2014
- Introduced by: Dominic Treadwell-Collins (2014); Jon Sen (2019); Chris Clenshaw (2024); Ben Wadey (2026)
In-universe information
- Occupation: Soldier; Car salesman; Fish salesman; Barman; Telesales representative
- Father: Mick Carter
- Mother: Linda Carter
- Stepmother: Janine Butcher
- Brothers: Johnny Carter; Ollie Carter
- Sisters: Nancy Carter
- Half-sisters: Frankie Lewis; Annie Carter
- Wife: Whitney Dean (2016–2017)
- Sons: Michael Carter
- Grandfathers: Buster Briggs; John Peacock
- Grandmothers: Shirley Carter; Elaine Peacock
- Uncles: Dean Wicks; Jimbo Wicks
- Aunts: Carly Wicks
- First cousins: Jade Masood
- Other relatives: Sylvie Carter; Stan Carter; Babe Smith; Tina Carter; Zsa Zsa Carter

Lee Carter, played by Danny Hatchard, made his first appearance on 4 April 2014. He is the eldest son of Mick Carter (Danny Dyer) and Linda Carter (Kellie Bright). Hatchard's casting was announced on 21 January 2014, while the character has previously been mentioned by members of his on-screen family. Hatchard began filming with the show that February. Of his casting, the actor said "I'm incredibly excited to be a part of EastEnders, a show that my family and I have watched for years. It's an honour to have the chance to share the camera with such talented actors and I can't wait to get cracking and join the Carter family." Lee comes to Walford having served a tour of duty as a soldier in Afghanistan. Digital Spy's Meg Drewett reports that Lee is a "Jack-the lad" character with parents that are happy to have him home, but they soon become frustrated by Lee's "reluctance to pull his weight" with their pub. Executive producer Dominic Treadwell-Collins commented that "Lee Carter is going to pelt into the Square, ruffle some feathers and immediately prove that he's a chip off his father's block.". In late April 2014, Hatchard took a short break from the soap, and returned in July. On 21 August 2016, it was announced that Hatchard had been axed by the new executive producer Sean O'Connor and would be leaving the soap after completing his three-year contract. He departed on 17 February 2017. In August 2017, Hatchard was longlisted for Best Exit at the Inside Soap Awards. The nomination did not progress to the viewer-voted shortlist. On 13 September 2019, it was announced that Lee would return later in the year for a short stint for Linda's storyline. He returned on 24 December 2019 and departed on 3 January 2020, and appeared again on 31 December 2020 in a previously unannounced return. Hatchard was spotted filming with the cast and crew in October 2024, and returned for a one-off appearance on 16 December 2024. Two years later, Hatchard reprised the role once again for a short stint as part of the exit storyline of his mother, Linda, making his returning alongside his sister Nancy Carter (Maddy Hill) on 5 October 2026.

When the Carters move to Albert Square, Lee is serving in the Army and speaks with his mother Linda using the internet. Three months later, his father Mick visits Stan Carter (Timothy West), Mick's grandfather but before he can reach the flat he is punched by an unknown youth, and afterwards Mick discloses to Max Branning (Jake Wood) that he believes that the man was his son, Lee. A week later, it is Lee who saves Stan from a small fire at The Queen Victoria public house. The family meet at the hospital. When Mick asks him why he punched him, he confirms that he was in Stan's flat. Lee then has sex with Lucy Beale (Hetti Bywater); however, she insists it was a one-night stand. He begins pursuing Whitney Dean (Shona McGarty) instead, but later resumes his affair with Lucy. When Lucy is found dead after being murdered (see "Who Killed Lucy Beale?"), the police take a DNA sample from Lee before he returns to the army.

He returns as a surprise for Linda on her birthday. He bonds with his uncle, Dean Wicks (Matt Di Angelo), and becomes drunk at his mother's party. After passing out on Mick's bed, he tells his father he did something stupid in connection with Lucy. The next day, Lee reveals that he saw Lucy arguing with Billy Mitchell (Perry Fenwick). Lee, along with his great-aunt Tina Carter (Luisa Bradshaw-White) and her girlfriend Tosh Mackintosh (Rebecca Scroggs), confront Billy, but he angrily tells them to leave. In Dot Branning's (June Brown) memorial to the commemorate the centenary of World War I, Lee raises and lowers the Union Flag as a memorial. He tries to win back Whitney, but she is still upset about how he abandoned her for Lucy. Eventually, she forgives him, and they begin a relationship. Whitney's adoptive mother Bianca Butcher (Patsy Palmer) protests to the relationship until Lee wins her round. Lee and Whitney have sex, and she confides in him that her estranged brother Ryan Malloy (Neil McDermott) is trying to get back in contact with her.

Lee is later unhappy when Ben Mitchell (Harry Reid) returns to Walford after serving time in prison for killing his father Phil Mitchell's (Steve McFadden) ex-girlfriend Shirley Carter's (Linda Henry) best friend, Heather Trott (Cheryl Ferguson). Lee's brother Johnny Carter (Sam Strike) shows an interest in him, knowing that he is gay, but Ben tells him he is no longer homosexual and insults Johnny with homophobic names, resulting in Lee viciously attacking him. Lee realises that Lauren Branning's (Jacqueline Jossa) alibi is suspicious when he views her outside Lucy's house on a video taken on the night of Lucy's death. He also later shares this information with the police investigating Lucy's murder. Lee and his sister Nancy Carter (Maddy Hill) later learn that Mick and Linda are not actually married as they had previously thought.

During Christmas and the New Year following Johnny's departure to go travelling, Lee and Nancy become paranoid about the situation between their parents and Dean, who believe that Dean has done something wrong. Lee and Nancy are left in charge of The Queen Vic for several weeks while Mick and Linda go on holiday. Nancy is determined to know what Dean has done, but Shirley and Tina refuse to talk to Nancy without Mick and Linda's consent. When Shirley moves Dean in, Nancy is upset by this and Lee tries to talk Nancy into accepting Dean's presence while Mick and Linda are away. After throwing a party, Mick and Linda later return and are horrified to see Shirley behind the bar and Dean drinking in The Queen Vic. After reporting Dean to the police, Linda finally reveals to Lee and Nancy that Dean raped her and it is possible that he could be the father of Linda's unborn baby. Lee is angry to learn of this news and is determined to make Dean pay. Both Lee and Mick's tempers worsen when Dean continues to harass them and their family. Lee and Dean fight in the street when Dean denies attacking Linda and Mick makes it clear to Dean and Shirley to stay away from The Queen Vic, although Shirley decides to instead stand by him when Dean disappears for a few weeks. Lee is later happy when Linda proposes to Mick, who accepts.

Lee and his family are upset to learn that Stan has died after he was diagnosed with terminal prostate cancer. The feud between Dean, Shirley and Mick continues, which begins to cause disruption for the other members of the Carter family. Dean is arrested on suspicion of breaking his bail conditions, but he is later released from prison. Linda gives birth to a baby boy, later named Ollie (Jack Tilley), after falling down the stairs and Lee is struggling to come to terms with the possibility that the baby may only be his half-brother. Mick talks Lee round to accepting the fact that the baby may be Dean's but he will always be the baby's brother, half or not. Lee is later relieved when he learns that Ollie is not Dean's, and visits Linda and Ollie in hospital, with the company of Nancy and Whitney.

Lee begins to develop clinical depression, which leads to him missing work and being discharged from the Army when he punches one of his colleagues who flirts with Whitney. Lee is prescribed medication for his condition but he refuses take it. He gets a job at the local car lot, but Lee develops bitter feelings towards those around him, repeatedly shunning Whitney and his family. His worsening alcoholism nearly gets him sacked from the car lot, but Whitney convinces Fatboy (Ricky Norwood) to give Lee one more chance. Lee's mood improves when he makes a sale at the car lot and is invited to a Halloween party. However, a heavily pregnant Stacey Branning (Lacey Turner) is electrocuted by a broken socket that Lee did not fix properly. Stacey's boyfriend Martin Fowler (James Bye) punches Lee and threatens to kill him if Stacey's baby dies. Lee breaks down in Whitney's arms when he realises the baby could be dead because of him and confesses to being drunk when fixing the socket, but is relieved when Whitney tells him that the baby and Stacey are not badly injured. He and Whitney are later invited to have lunch with Martin, Stacey, Kush Kazemi (Davood Ghadami) and Shabnam Masood (Rakhee Thakrar) in The Queen Vic, where Martin apologises to Lee for punching him and forgives him for the incident. Days later, during Dean and Roxy Mitchell's (Rita Simons) engagement party, Lee gets drunk and confronts Shirley after finding out that she and Mick have been seeing each other secretly. During the argument, Lee tries to attack his grandfather Buster Briggs (Karl Howman), who escorts him out and takes him to the café. Buster tells Lee that he needs to start taking his anti-depressants and stay focused on his career. He then returns him home and Lee tells Mick that he has no problem with him and Shirley seeing each other. Lee later knocks himself unconscious while trying to eject Dean from the pub, so is carried upstairs by Mick and Whitney. When he regains consciousness, he overhears Whitney confess to Mick via the baby monitor that she intends to break up with him after Mick and Linda's upcoming wedding, unable to handle his depression. On New Year's Day 2016, the day of the wedding, Lee goes missing and Whitney and Mick find him drunk at the park. Lee then tells Whitney that he blames himself for her wanting to break up with him, and she promises him that they will work things out. Later, when Phil turns up at The Queen Vic drunk and demands more drinks, Lee tries to escort him out but Phil, being the owner of the car lot, sacks him. Lee later works alongside Buster at his local fish stall, but sneaks off one afternoon for an interview with local landlady Thelma Bragg (Lorraine Stanley), whom was initially interested in hiring Nancy. Lee gets the job, but when Nancy, who was covering his shift for Buster, finds out, she calls him a spineless traitor before assuring him that he will not last long given his history of failure. Although Whitney praises Lee for getting the job, he walks away in misery.

To assist with getting to work, Mick buys Lee a new car, which he takes Whitney for a drive in. During their drive, Whitney confesses to kissing Mick. An enraged Lee finds Mick and Linda at Ian Beale's (Adam Woodyatt) restaurant and tries to attack them both. He later gets drunk and is thrown out of The Albert by Vincent Hubbard (Richard Blackwood) for insulting his wife, Kim Fox-Hubbard (Tameka Empson). He then bumps into an equally drunk Abi Branning (Lorna Fitzgerald) and they end up having unprotected sex. Whitney goes to stay with Sonia Fowler (Natalie Cassidy), where the next day, Nancy drops the rest of Whitney's belongings off as Lee is unable to face her after what happened with Mick. However, he later sees Abi talking to Whitney, and fears she may have told them about their one-night stand. Abi denies doing so, but tells Lee that Whitney is planning to leave Walford. Lee rushes to Sonia's house and begs Whitney to stay, finally confessing that he has not been taking his anti-depressants. When his family finds out, Mick furiously denounces him for lying, but Lee promises to ensure he gets better from now on. Later, when Whitney comes down to The Queen Vic after talking to Nancy, Lee asks her to marry him, and she accepts. Lee's relationship with Nancy is further tarnished when he reveals he told Thelma about Nancy's epilepsy, which further jeopardised her chances of getting the job. She then leaves The Queen Vic to move in with Donna Yates (Lisa Hammond) and works on her market stall. Lee eventually quits his new job following what he believes to be sexual harassment from Thelma, and decides to work at The Queen Vic, taking Nancy's old bartending job. Nancy joins everyone for a Mother's Day meal, but when she finds out Lee took her old job, they have another argument. Lee tells her that he is not surprised her boyfriend Tamwar Masood (Himesh Patel) left her, prompting Nancy to angrily push Lee. He falls into Ollie's highchair, sending him and Ollie (now Charlie Harrington) crashing to the floor as Nancy and Whitney watch in shock. Mick and Linda rush back to find that Ollie has no apparent injuries, but Nancy and Lee continue to argue despite Mick and Linda's protests. Eventually, Mick loses his temper, smashing a chair and throwing Lee and Nancy out of The Queen Vic. When Linda later finds Ollie not breathing in his cot and later suffers a seizure, the Carters are told that Ollie may have brain damage, after hitting his head severely during Lee and Nancy's fight. Mick blames Nancy for the accident, and after months of feuding, he forgives her; however, Nancy and Tamwar leave Walford to go travelling.

When Whitney discovers she is pregnant, Lee worries that he would not be a good father due to his depression. They visit the doctors, but both Lee and Whitney are tested positive for chlamydia, which Lee caught from Abi. Lee lets Whitney wrongly believe that she had caught the STI during her past relationship with Rob Grayson (Jody Latham), who sexually exploited her. Abi confesses to Whitney about the one-night stand and she ends her relationship with Lee and considers leaving Walford, but after speaking to Linda, she decides to give Lee another chance, saying that having a baby with him would bring her the happiness that she needs. To make up for his mistakes, Lee takes Whitney to the registry office to book their wedding date. Two months later, Lee and Whitney are devastated when Whitney has suffers a miscarriage. Lee is agitated when he believes that him giving Whitney chlamydia may have caused the miscarriage. He cancels his stag party and promises Whitney that he will change and be a better boyfriend, only for her to tell him that she is moving to Milton Keynes to stay with Bianca. Lee is accepting of this and after Whitney reassures him that their relationship is not over, he watches her leave tearfully. However, Whitney returns the next day, admitting that she missed Lee. Lee tells her how much he wants to look after her and she tells him that she is sure that he will. Lee gets a job, telling everyone he is a sales executive in the city. However, he worries about how he will cope. After his first day at work, Lee uses a credit card to buy Whitney an expensive pair of earrings. Johnny (now Ted Reilly) worries about the amount of money that Lee is spending on his wedding, but Lee insists he is fine. Lee checks his bank account and sees he is £250 overdrawn, and then applies for a £2,000 payday loan. Lee realises he should be honest with Whitney about the money but he backs out of telling her. When Abi realises Lee is not over Whitney's miscarriage, she tells him she should have told him about the chlamydia as she read that it could have caused the miscarriage, leaving him worried. Lee confronts Whitney over her miscarriage lie, and she admits that she worried how he would cope but now wants complete honesty, to which he agrees. However, he ignores reminders about repaying the loan. Johnny discovers Lee's debts and tells him to be honest with Whitney before they marry the following day. He attempts to tell her but she thinks he is stressed over not spending time together and tells him not to worry. Lee calls in sick to work so that he and Whitney can marry. On the wedding night, Lee pretends to be asleep when Whitney wants to consummate the marriage.

It is revealed that Lee has lied about his job and he is working in a call centre and is the worst performer, and his boss realises (due to social media searching), he called in sick for his wedding, so docks his pay. Trapped in a depressed state, Lee cries at home but keeps the truth from his family. When Whitney surprises Lee at work, she assumes Lee's colleague Oz Bolat (Noah Maxwell-Clarke) is his employee. Whitney hopes to move to an expensive flat in Stratford and asks Lee to put a deposit on the flat but knowing he cannot afford it, he does not do so and tells her he was too late. However, Jack Branning (Scott Maslen) offers one of his flats on Albert Square at a reduced rate so Whitney is happy but Lee still knows he cannot afford it. He asks his boss for an advance on his wages but is refused due to his poor performance. Lee then steals a sentimental piece of jewellery from Linda, attempting to pawn it, but he is not offered what he expected. He tells Shirley he cannot afford a flat, so she tells him that Whitney will be happy as long as she has him. He cheers up following Shirley's comment, but when Whitney buys a picture reading "home sweet home" for the flat, he steals charity money from the pub and tells Jack he has a deposit. Whitney and Lee move in but he makes excuses not to have sex with her and she worries when his mood swings return. When Whitney seduces Lee, he suffers erectile dysfunction due to his depression, though Whitney comforts him. Whitney then suspects Lee is having an affair, and when she tries to surprise him by visiting him at work, she finds out he has called in sick. He spends the day hiding in the allotments, briefly encountering Patrick Trueman (Rudolph Walker), who tells him that relationships built on lies never last. Whitney confronts Lee, accusing him of having an affair, but he says he was buying her a Christmas present. Whitney believes him and they finally have sex. At work, Lee is continuously harassed and bullied by his aggressive colleague Oz, who tells him he knows he was not sick the previous day and can prove it. Lee pushes Oz, but later apologises, saying it will not happen again. Oz agrees, revealing that he has slashed Lee's suit jacket.

A few nights later, The Queen Vic is violently burgled by three masked men armed with baseball bats, who steal thousands of pounds of money and almost abduct Ollie during their thievery, while also striking Johnny across the face with a baseball bat. It is later revealed that the culprits are Oz and Lee's other colleagues and that Lee organised the robbery. However, Oz denies Lee his share of the money as he was supposed to make sure Whitney was not there as she could have recognised Oz, seeing this mistake as botching up the operation. Lee cries when he causes a paranoid Linda to jump. Whitney decides to host a Carter family Christmas lunch at her and Lee's home and refuses any financial contribution from Linda as Lee is doing well at work; when Lee hears the plan, he tries to secure another payday loan. When Whitney buys an expensive Christmas gift for Linda, Lee applies for a further loan but is refused. A package is delivered for his neighbour, which Lee opens to find a virtual reality headset, which he pawns for cash. On Christmas Day, Lee is arrested for conspiracy to commit robbery. The next day he is released without charge and tells Whitney and Mick that it was mistaken identity, but when Whitney angrily demands the truth, he admits that he told his colleagues that cash was kept in the pub overnight because he wanted to be liked and accepted. She calls him pathetic and says he disgusts her but says she will not tell Mick because he is dealing with the stress of Linda being in Spain with her mother Elaine Peacock (Maria Friedman), who has suffered a stroke.

Lee asks Whitney to take a pregnancy test but she says she cannot get over that he was involved in the robbery, calling him "spineless". Lee is frustrated when he is late for work, crying and shouting at a parking attendant, Karen Beckworth (Sally Rogers), when a machine will not take his money. At work, Lee gets a sale, but Oz says the old woman he convinced to change energy supplier will lose money and could die when she finds out. Lee passes his review with Haroon, who tells him to "man up" in 2017 and Lee then sees a fitness poster reading, "2017, time to be a man". Oz catches Lee crying and calls him a "cry-baby girl", trying to take a photo on his phone and telling Lee that he would lose everything if his family and friends knew the truth, calling him "spineless", and Whitney would leave if she met a "real man". Lee goes to his car where he vents his frustrations, writes a note saying "I'm sorry", and leaves his car, heading for the edge of the roof of the car park where he contemplates suicide. Karen finds him; he says that unlike other people, he finds life hard and is pretending all the time, feels worthless and has seriously let his family down; Karen tells him he is not a bad person, and tells him life has its ups and downs, convincing him to come down and go to her office where she gives him a card from the Samaritans; after he leaves, she cries in front of a photograph of a boy. At home, Whitney tells Lee she is not pregnant but she wants to be, and he says they will take things one step at a time.

Mick finds the Samaritans card in Lee's phone case and confronts him about it, asking why he would confide in a stranger and not his family. Lee finally confesses that he was in on the robbery of The Queen Vic alongside his colleagues, before also admitting he had thought about suicide because of how bad he felt about the robbery. An enraged Mick tells Lee he should have gone through with the suicide, but later says he did not mean it but admits that he cannot forgive Lee, who breaks down in tears. Lee offers to accompany Mick to Ollie's next appointment but Mick refuses. He then tells Lee that while he is still not ready to forgive him, he will lend him money to clear his debt for Whitney's sake on the condition that Lee tells Whitney the truth about his job. When Lee tells Whitney the truth, she is devastated to learn that Lee lied because he thought she would be disappointed due to the lack of money his real job brings, but chooses to forgive him. After she tells Mick this, Mick forces Lee to give him Oz's address and returns with blood on his knuckles, sparking concern from Babe. When Lee next sees Oz, he has a black eye and tells Lee they should keep away from each other from now on.

Lee and Whitney begin to argue over money and he blames Whitney for his financial difficulties. This causes much tension for the couple and he becomes increasingly jealous when Danny Mitchell (Liam Bergin) tries to kiss her. Whitney decides to stay at The Queen Vic and Lee apologises to Whitney the next day for his behaviour. Babe gets the Carters into trouble with the law and when everyone turns against her, she reveals Lee's involvement in the robbery; resulting Johnny to become hostile to Lee. Whitney decides to pawn her wedding rings so she and Lee can afford a night out. She invites one of Lee's ex-army friends ("Beanbag") and persuades him to offer Lee a job in security after informing them that he is in Dover doing such a job. Lee thinks that Whitney is flirting with his friend which causes a row. When Whitney admits that she pawned her wedding ring, she tells Lee that she wishes that he was more like Mick. Lee hits her in a rage of anger and is instantly wracked with guilt. He begs Whitney for forgiveness, but she lies on their bed in silence clearly frightened of Lee. The next day, Whitney decides to forgive Lee on the condition that he will never assault her again, therefore he should seek anger management therapy. Lee gratefully accepts for the sake of working out their marriage.

On Valentine's Day, Mick tells Lee that the best thing he can do for Whitney is to leave her. Despite this, on his way to work, Lee talks to Patrick, who gives him advice on his marriage. Lee then treats Whitney to a romantic dinner, and just after asking for the bill, Lee tells Whitney that he has left a surprise for her back at the flat and insists he should go back. While waiting for him to return, Whitney realises that Lee has gone for a long time, so she returns to their flat, only to find all of his belongings are gone and reads a handwritten note from Lee saying he no longer loves her. Whitney attempts to contact him, to no avail, not knowing that Lee has called Mick requesting to see him. Mick meets Lee, who tells him that he is going to remain in Dover because he cannot stay in Walford. He returns to Walford briefly to see Whitney and tearfully explains the situation. An upset Whitney, realising that Lee plans to leave on his own to figure himself out, tells him to leave and she watches him from the window as he drives off. After saying a tearful farewell to his family, Lee leaves after Mick tells him that Walford will always be his home.

Several weeks later, Lee attempts to call Whitney but the pub's new manager Woody Woodward (Lee Ryan) tells Lee that she does not want to speak to him, so Lee sends his friend Moose (Sam Gittins) to see her, who says that Lee wants a divorce. Whitney receives a letter from Lee's solicitor, citing her unreasonable behaviour as grounds for the divorce, but Woody tells her it is not a big deal and Whitney agrees, deciding it is time to move on from Lee.

In 2019, during Christmas, Mick contacts Lee and asks him to come back to Walford to surprise Linda. However, he returns to find her in a drunken, unconscious state on the ground. Lee rushes Linda to hospital and questions her and Mick repeatedly about her behaviour. He also confesses that he is in a relationship with a woman named Sophie. Linda denies having a drinking problem. Lee soon discovers that Mick has been having panic attacks and is shocked to see the animosity between his parents. He admits to Linda that he once tried to commit suicide as he felt he could not talk to anyone, and he urges her to talk to Mick. Meanwhile, Whitney is angry with Lee for not talking to her about their divorce and blaming her for the breakdown of their marriage. Lee apologises to her, saying that she did not deserve the way he treated her. Whitney then admits that she is scared to leave her house, due to being stalked by Leo King (Tom Wells). Lee advises her to fight back. Buoyed by Lee's advice, Whitney dresses up for New Year's Eve and Lee is proud of her and they agree to be friends. On New Year's Eve, Linda becomes unhealthily drunk and is even disorderly with Mick and Lee. Lee departs Walford once again after advising Linda to stop arguing with Mick.

In his absence, Linda's alcoholism continues to worsen, brought on by the guilt of killing Keanu Taylor (Danny Walters) in self-defence and the threats made against her by his half sister, Bernadette (Clair Norris). In 2024, after being banished from The Queen Vic by Lee's grandmother Elaine Peacock (Harriet Thorpe), Linda experiences an epiphany where she imagines her death and funeral. Within it, Nancy and Lee return to say goodbye, in which Nancy blames Elaine for not doing enough to stop Linda's drinking while Lee is more supportive. After Nancy slaps Elaine outside the church, she and Lee decide to take a now alcoholic Johnny (now Charlie Suff) along with Ollie and Annie away from Walford. The epiphany finally breaks through to Linda and she agrees to seek help for her addiction.

== Donna Yates ==
Donna Yates, played by Lisa Hammond made her first appearance on 14 April 2014. Donna was not originally a disabled character, but this was changed when Hammond, who has dwarfism, impressed producers during her audition. Donna is the second regular disabled character to appear in EastEnders after Adam Best (David Proud). Donna is a market trader, who clashes with rival stall holders Bianca Butcher (Patsy Palmer) and Kat Moon (Jessie Wallace). In an interview with Inside Soap, Hammond said, "there will be a humorous side to Donna." Despite being billed as aggressive and difficult, Hammond insists that she will not be totally unlikeable. She continued, "Initially, Donna is very opinionated. But there is a humorous side to her. I don't want her to just be a hard-faced cow. There needs to be a glint in her eye, tinged with a bit of sarcasm as well. It was hard to launch into being such a fiery character. Once I settled in, I thought, 'This is fun – people will hate me!'" It was reported that her character would get on the wrong side of Bianca and Kat immediately, following their assumption she is from the council. Hammond was nominated for Best Bitch at the Inside Soap Awards in 2014 for her portrayal as Donna. In August 2017, Hammond was longlisted for Funniest Female at the Inside Soap Awards. She did not progress to the viewer-voted shortlist.

== Shrimpy ==
Shrimpy
- EastEnders character
- Portrayed by: Ben Champniss
- Duration: 2014–present
- First appearance: Episode 4837; 14 April 2014
- Introduced by: Dominic Treadwell-Collins
- Spin-off appearances: Tracey: A Day in the Life (2024)
In-universe information
- Occupation: Market stall holder

Shrimpy, played by Ben Champniss, is a market trader on Bridge Street after it is merged with the Spring Lane market. Champniss was first credited in the role on 15 October 2015.

Shrimpy begins working on the market in Albert Square alongside Pam Coker (Lin Blakley) and Donna Yates (Lisa Hammond) following the Spring Lane merge and owns a clothing stall, often helping out his co-workers when they are busy running their own errands. He is impressed by Donna and goes on a date with her after she fails to bond romantically with her roommate, Alfie Moon (Shane Richie); however, their relationship does not progress any further. In 2016, he annoys market traders when there is no market inspector by bringing a van onto the market. He is also paid by Babe Smith (Annette Badland) after she is fired from her chef job at The Queen Victoria, to ask for her specials and refusing to eat when they are not available, so that she can get her job back. In December 2016, Shrimpy attends a party for the market traders, where Roxy Mitchell (Rita Simons) dances with him but he rejects her because of the state she is in, making her realise she needs help. Later, when Carmel Kazemi (Bonnie Langford) realises that Donna likes Shrimpy, she gets them to kiss under the mistletoe. In January 2017, he is among those injured when a bus crashes into the market. He, however, helps those in worse condition. In April, Shrimpy wins the Mr Walford contest at the Easter fair.

David Brown from Radio Times called Shrimpy a "hat-wearing, mod-haired market trader".

== Pam Coker ==
Pam Coker
- EastEnders character
- Portrayed by: Lin Blakley
- Duration: 2014–2019, 2022
- First appearance: Episode 4837; 14 April 2014
- Last appearance: Episode 6417; 14 January 2022
- Introduced by: Dominic Treadwell-Collins (2014); Sean O'Connor (2017); John Yorke (2018); Jon Sen (2019, 2022)
In-universe information
- Occupation: Funeral director; Market stallholder
- Sisters: Miriam Crabbe
- Husband: Les Coker
- Sons: Lawrie Coker
- Grandsons: Paul Coker

Pam Coker, played by Lin Blakley, made her first appearance on 14 April 2014. The character and casting was announced on 4 April 2014. Pam is the wife of established character Les Coker (Roger Sloman) who was made a regular in April 2014. Of her casting, Blakley said "Being part of EastEnders is like going to work and being with another family. I'm really enjoying myself. Working with Roger has been wonderful from the word go, we have a laugh together and I feel like I have known him forever." Executive producer Dominic Treadwell-Collins said "Les and Pam are part of our plans to rejuvenate the show's older generation. It's already so exciting to watch the chemistry between Roger and Lin on set, playing characters who have been together for so long, they know each other inside out. Or so they think."

It was announced on 28 July 2016 that Pam and Les would leave later in 2016 after the both of them were written out by then-newly appointed executive producer Sean O'Connor. Pam and Les made their final appearances on 14 October 2016. Pam then began appearing on a recurring basis without Les. She made an unannounced guest appearance on 25 May 2017, to attend Billy and Honey's housewarming party. She made another guest appearance on 22 June 2017 and another on 5 February 2018. Blakely reprised the role for two episodes on 7 and 8 November 2019. She reprised the role again in January 2022.

A reporter writing for the Inside Soap Yearbook described Pam and Les as a "soap favourite" and hoped they would "hurry home soon".

Pam makes her first appearance on 14 April 2014. She is delighted that her husband Les has bought 53 Turpin Road for their funeral parlour. The following week, the couple move into the upstairs flat, and Pam opens up her flower stall as the Spring Lane street market has been merged with the Bridge Street market. Pam is not in competition with anyone. She enjoys listening to the arguments and gossip between other rival stall holders. While Pam babysits for Billy Mitchell (Perry Fenwick) and Lola Pearce (Danielle Harold), she discovers photographs of the recently murdered Lucy Beale (Hetti Bywater) behind Billy's fridge (see "Who Killed Lucy Beale?"). Pam confronts Billy who explains that the photographs of Lucy are not his but are her twin brother Peter's (Ben Hardy). Pam befriends Sonia Fowler (Natalie Cassidy) and helps her organise a naked charity calendar, posing nude herself with Mo Harris (Laila Morse) for the month of April. She becomes upset when DC Emma Summerhayes (Anna Acton) tells her that secrets always have a habit of revealing themselves. On the anniversary of her son, Lawrie's, death, she goes missing with Janet. When she returns with Janet, Billy is upset with her. Pam discloses to Emma that she used to be a social worker until accusations were made that she brought about the death of Lawrie, her terminally ill son; telling Emma that the accusations were false, but confessing to Billy that they were true. When Billy discovers the funeral parlour is in trouble because Les cannot bring himself to push bereaved families to pay overdue bills, Billy insists Les tell Pam the truth. Les is unwilling to upset Pam on their anniversary, but eventually confesses, and the pair agree to have no more secrets. However, Les is then revealed to be secretly meeting another woman to whom he gives a necklace. When Pam organises a 30th birthday party for Donna Yates (Lisa Hammond) soon afterwards, she secretly invites Donna's foster mother Claudette Hubbard (Ellen Thomas) – the same woman Les is secretly meeting. It is then revealed that Pam placed Donna in Claudette's care when she was a social worker and that the two are good friends.

Les and Pam's grandson, Paul Coker (Jonny Labey), comes to stay in Walford with them after a two-year absence, despite animosity between him and Les as he believed he had found out Les and Claudette were having an affair before his departure. Two months later, Paul tells Pam that Les is having an affair with Claudette. Pam tries to confront Claudette about the affair, but loses her nerve. Pam uneasily tells Paul to stop thinking about the affair but later freaks out when she sees Claudette in the photo with her and Les in the newspaper, and admits to Paul that he is, in fact, right about it. Pam tries to arrange a dinner with Les and Claudette, but they both decline, secretly meeting up at Claudette's house. Pam finds Les' tie at Claudette's house and they both give conflicting explanations to her. She later goes to stay with her sister Mim Crabbe (Helen Cotterill), returning to find Les and Claudette together, with Claudette encouraging Les to tell Pam the truth. Les tries to explain that he and Claudette grew close after Lawrie's death when he needed someone to talk to, but it has only ever been platonic. Pam seeks advice from single mother Carol Jackson (Lindsey Coulson), who encourages her to work on her marriage and seek some more answers from Les. Pam then issues Les an ultimatum: he must stop seeing Claudette or she will leave him. On Lawrie's birthday, Pam is too upset to speak to Les, so he visits Claudette. Donna finds Les in his underwear at Claudette's house, and tells Pam what she has seen. Pam then goes to Claudette's house and sets about destroying Les's gifts until Claudette says they are not hers and Pam should ask Les about Christine. When Pam confronts Les, she is horrified to discover that Christine is his feminine alter-ego and that he enjoys wearing women's clothes, and tells Les he disgusts her, but restrains herself from telling Paul. The next day, she is still not coping with the revelation, but Donna and Claudette encourage her to speak to Les about it. After speaking to Les, she decides she wants to "meet" Christine. Whilst preparing Les for the "meeting", Claudette comforts a worried Pam, telling her the first time she "sees" Christine will be easier than she thinks. Upon "meeting" Christine, Pam is initially cautious, but after Les, as Christine, explains that this is how he can cope with things, as Christine is more open than Les, and he is still the same person, she becomes slightly more reciprocate. However, when Paul walks in on them and is horrified, Pam realises she knows nothing about her husband in his feminine form, so leaves to get some distance from Les. She stays with Donna overnight and then makes plans to visit Mim again, although Paul arrives at the train station to stop her. She later returns home to talk to Les, but when she gets hesitant again, Les moves out to give Pam some space and time as her friends and her job are clearly in Walford.

Paul makes efforts to reunite Pam and Les but it is tense and awkward. When Paul suddenly becomes withdrawn from them, they both confront him and he confesses his relationship with Ben Mitchell (Harry Reid), revealing he is in love with him. Les urges Paul to tell Ben his feelings, leaving Pam impressed with Les' approach at advice. Les admits to Pam that he is still in love with her, and she says she loves him too, but she is not ready to get back together with him yet. After another encounter with Les at the pub, where she admits she is unable to get the image of Christine out of her head when she sees him, Les calls Pam, telling her to meet at the allotments where he plans to burn Christine's things. She reluctantly watches as Les burns the things and allows him to walk her home. Several days later, Pam allows Les to move back in with her, but as she is still not ready to consummate their marriage, she orders single beds for her and Les. However, Pam and Les starts being blackmailed by Babe Smith (Annette Badland) after she finds a photograph of Les dressed as Christine at the allotments and she regularly demands money from them. Pam is then shocked to see Paul's estranged biological mother Jenny Rawlinson (Amy Marston) in Walford and she demands to meet Paul, but Pam refuses. When Les suffers a heart attack, Pam and Les decide to let Paul and his boyfriend, Ben, to continue with the family business at the funeral parlour. Following a night out with Ben, Paul is later killed off-screen in a suspected homophobic attack. Initially, Pam denies that it is Paul, but later identifies him in the mortuary with Les. When everyone proposes a toast in Paul's memory, Pam blames Ben for causing Paul's death, wishing it was him who had died instead of Paul. Pam and Les are later relieved when Claudette helps them expose Babe's blackmail. At Paul's funeral, Pam makes a truce with Ben after hearing his emotional eulogy for Paul and later decides to allow Les to be Christine, realising that she may need him to show this side of his personality.

Before a bail hearing for Paul's murder, Pam meets a woman in the toilets and comforts her, but later realises she is actually the mother of one of Paul's killers. Paul's killers are refused bail and Pam escorts Les out of the courtroom. When they return home, Pam and Les consider leaving Walford together after the trial is over. Pam decides to visit Diane Atmore (Hazel Ellerby), the mother of Simon Atmore (Tom Palmer), one of Paul's killers, to try to get her to persuade him to plead guilty. Les thinks this is a bad idea as Pam could scupper the whole case. Pam messages Diane with Honey's assistance and arranges to meet her. Accompanied by Ben's mother Kathy Sullivan (Gillian Taylforth), Pam meets Diane who tells her she will not persuade Simon to plead guilty. However, she ends up doing so and at the hearing, Simon and the rest of Paul's killers plead guilty to killing Paul and to kidnapping Ben and Jay Brown (Jamie Borthwick). They are sentenced to thirty years in prison. Pam asks Ben to help her clear out Paul's bedroom. She then drops off his clothes to a homeless shelter where she is stunned to find Jay who has been sleeping rough. She persuades him to come back to the Square for Ben's sake, and she convinces Sharon Mitchell (Letitia Dean) to allow Jay back into the Mitchell household. At a farewell party for the Cokers in The Queen Vic, Pam confronts Babe—who has recently returned the money she took from them—and tells her that she is a sad, pathetic old woman who she feels sorry for and that she will never have what she and Les have. After making an emotional farewell to all their friends, handing over the funeral parlour to Billy to manage and persuading Billy to give Jay a job, Pam and Les depart Walford for a new life in Worthing. Pam returns for Honey's housewarming party and tells Ben that he needs to move on from Paul. Before leaving, Pam tells Billy that Les is very impressed with his running of the business and offers him a partnership and wants to rename the company Coker and Mitchell.

When Billy gets himself involved in a heist with former criminal Aidan Maguire (Patrick Bergin), he ends up illegally digging up a grave. The following month, Pam returns and tells Billy that his act has been caught on CCTV and has resulted in a bad reputation for the business. She appoints Jay as the new manager and fires Billy.

== DC Emma Summerhayes ==
DC Emma Summerhayes
- EastEnders character
- Portrayed by: Anna Acton
- Duration: 2014–2015
- First appearance: Episode 4841; 21 April 2014
- Last appearance: Episode 4990; 2 January 2015
- Introduced by: Dominic Treadwell-Collins
In-universe information
- Occupation: Detective Constable; Family liaison officer
- Father: Henry Summerhayes
- Mother: Margot Summerhayes

Detective Constable Emma Summerhayes, portrayed by Anna Acton, appears between 21 April 2014 and 2 January 2015. She is the Police Family Liaison Officer for the Beales after Lucy Beale (Hetti Bywater) is murdered.

Emma first appears with her colleague DS Cameron Bryant (Glen Wallace) to inform Ian Beale (Adam Woodyatt) that his daughter, Lucy, has been found dead on Walford Common. Emma supports the Beales as they mourn Lucy's death and becomes familiar with the residents of Albert Square during the early days of the investigation. However, she meets Max Branning (Jake Wood) in the Bridge Street café and they both strike a bond after she confides in him about the breakdown of her engagement. Emma and Max begin a relationship but they keep it secret because Max is a suspect in the investigation and Emma knows that it could put her job at risk. Emma gets a new boss, DI Samantha Keeble (Alison Newman), who dislikes Emma. She is further worried when she discovers Keeble had investigated Max before.

Max is suspicious of Charlie Cotton (Declan Bennett) and the two have a rivalry but Charlie discovers Emma and Max's relationship, which infuriates Max. Emma does a background check on Charlie and finds out that he is impersonating a police officer. Emma tries to arrest him but he tells Emma he is a Special Operations Officer and threatens to report her unless she breaks up with Max. Emma, frightened at the prospect of losing her job, ends her relationship with Max who retaliates by placing an anonymous call to the police about their affair. Emma is immediately taken off the case and is suspended from the force. Max tries to reconcile with Emma, but she reveals that she is still engaged to her fiancé, who turns out to be DS Cameron Bryant. Emma tells Max that she loves him and has left Bryant for good because of the way that he treated her when they were together. Emma then introduces Max and his daughters, Lauren (Jacqueline Jossa) and Abi (Lorna Fitzgerald), to her parents, Henry (Will Knightley) and Margot (Jill Baker), who initially dislike Max. However, they eventually accept him and Emma moves from Clapham into Max's home. Whilst she is facing a disciplinary hearing, Keeble asks Emma to hand over Lauren's laptop, something Emma refuses to do as it is breaks police rules. However, when reminded that she could lose her job, Emma gives Keeble the laptop, but soon regrets this and later confesses to Lauren what she has done. The police find suspicious activity on Lucy's social media site, which was down to Whitney Dean (Shona McGarty), but they also discover that Abi knew about Max and Lucy's affair. Despite helping Keeble, Emma loses her job.

Bryant tells Emma it was Max that placed the anonymous phonecall to the police about their relationship, and she angrily ends her relationship with him due to this. However, she finds an anonymous envelope addressed to her, which was posted by Lee Carter (Danny Hatchard), containing proof that Lauren was not truthful about her alibi. After viewing the clip, Emma shows it to Lauren, who tells her that she went to the Beale household because she wanted a drink and wanted to see Lucy. However, Lauren worries that Emma is just using her to spy on her family. Later that night, Max admits to Emma that her passion for her job is what made him fall in love with her, and that he only acted out of fear of losing her. She later admits to Max that she is also scared of their relationship not ending well, and both admit neither of them wants it to end, so agree to try to start again from scratch. Emma spends Christmas Day with the Branning and Beale families, but ends up asking questions about Lucy, which upset the others. She then arranges drinks in The Queen Victoria pub with both families, and uses it as an opportunity to pry. Jane Beale (Laurie Brett) takes umbrage and points out that Emma is no longer a police officer and the murder investigation is no longer any of her business. However, after an argument breaks out between Ian and Denise Fox (Diane Parish), Emma makes a discovery and rushes home. She finds the case notes of the murder investigation and solves the case. Emma makes a phonecall to an unknown person, telling them, "I know you killed Lucy". On New Year's Day 2015, Emma meets the suspect in the park in an attempt to convince them to go to the police. Emma later texts the suspect stating that she cannot keep the secret any longer. She is then hit by a car, driven by Roxy Mitchell (Rita Simons), that has been tampered with by Nick Cotton (John Altman). Emma initially appears to be fine but she later collapses. Max takes Emma to hospital after she bleeds from the ear but she later dies from a brain haemorrhage.

In February 2015, shortly after Ian's wedding to Jane, he finds out that his son Bobby Beale (Eliot Carrington) killed Lucy and that Jane has been covering for him. Jane admits to meeting with Emma at the park on New Year's Day in an attempt to stop her going to the police. She reveals that Emma suspected she lied about her alibi about her being at Masood Ahmed's (Nitin Ganatra) house at the time because Max had video footage showing that her car was not there. Jane states that her explanation of what happened caused Emma to hesitate on deciding whether to go to the police.

The car crash that killed Emma received a nomination at the Inside Soap Awards in 2015. In 2014, Katy Brent from the Daily Mirror called Emma "Walford's most useless family liaison officer".

== Cameron Bryant ==
DS Cameron Bryant
- EastEnders character
- Portrayed by: Glen Wallace
- Duration: 2014–2016
- First appearance: Episode 4841; 21 April 2014
- Last appearance: Episode 5302; 16 June 2016
- Introduced by: Dominic Treadwell-Collins
In-universe information
- Occupation: Detective Sergeant

Detective Sergeant Cameron Bryant, played by Glen Wallace, is a police sergeant investigating Lucy Beale's (Hetti Bywater) murder. He first appears in episode 4841, first broadcast on 21 April 2014, and makes his final appearance in episode 5302, first broadcast on 16 June 2016.

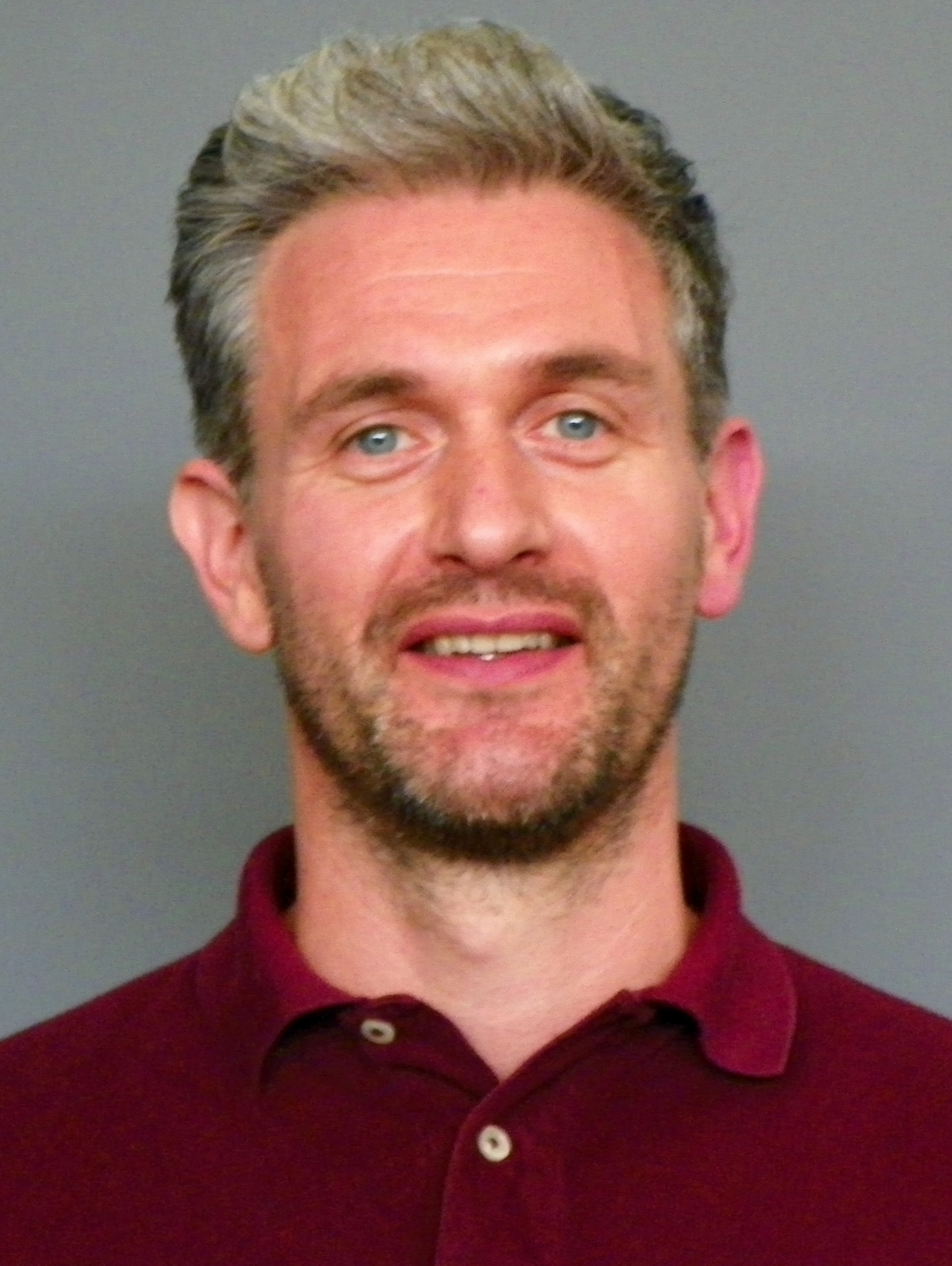
Glen Wallace portrays DS Cameron Bryant.

Cameron arrives with his colleague, DC Emma Summerhayes (Anna Acton), at the Beale household, when they inform Ian Beale (Adam Woodyatt) that his daughter, Lucy, is dead. He orders officers to search Lee Carter's (Danny-Boy Hatchard) bedroom and takes a DNA sample for forensics. When Max Branning (Jake Wood) changes his statement about his movements on the night of Lucy's death, Cameron returns with Emma to clarify Max and his daughter Abi's (Lorna Fitzgerald) statements. Cameron searches Phil Mitchell's (Steve McFadden) house in connection with a robbery committed by Jay Brown (Jamie Borthwick), the night Lucy was killed.

It emerges that Cameron is Emma's fiancé; when Cameron learns of Emma's affair with Max, he punches him. Emma leaves Cameron for Max. Suspecting Max's daughter Lauren Branning (Jacqueline Jossa) and Lucy's brother Peter Beale (Ben Hardy) to be involved in Lucy's death, Cameron keeps them under surveillance. When Emma is suspended from her job following her affair with Max, Cameron tells Emma that it was Max who reported her. When Emma dies, Cameron is sent to collect her things from Max's house, and tells him he is not welcome at her funeral.

When Max is wrongly found guilty of Lucy's murder, he escapes the courtroom, and punches Cameron when he tries to apprehend him. Max realises that Bobby Beale (Eliot Carrington) killed Lucy and as Cameron arrests Max, Max attempts to reveal this information but Cameron dismisses it as an act of desperation. When Max is sentenced to 21 years in prison, Lauren tells Cameron that Bobby did kill Lucy but Cameron refuses to believe her and insists that he swore when Emma died that Max would be punished for everything he did. Bobby later confesses to the police that he killed Lucy and is subsequently sentenced to three years in custody. Ian inadvertently reveals that he knew Bobby killed Lucy, but DI Samantha Keeble (Alison Newman) simply wishes him luck. Bryant asks about her inaction, so she says that Ian has suffered enough.

== Yvonne Cotton ==
Yvonne Cotton
- EastEnders character
- Portrayed by: Pauline McLynn
- Duration: 2014–2015
- First appearance: Episode 4853; 12 May 2014
- Last appearance: Episode 5067; 14 May 2015
- Introduced by: Dominic Treadwell-Collins
In-universe information
- Occupation: Nurse; Cleaner
- Husband: Nick Cotton (backstory)
- Sons: Charlie Cotton
- Grandsons: Matthew Mitchell Cotton

Yvonne Cotton, played by Pauline McLynn, made her first appearance on 12 May 2014. The character and McLynn's casting was announced on 25 April 2014. McLynn appears on a recurring basis as the mother of Charlie Cotton (Declan Bennett). Of her casting, the actress said "It is a thrill to join EastEnders, my favourite soap, and in particular any chance to be part of a Dot Cotton storyline is not to be passed up. June Brown is a legend and I feel privileged to act with her." Yvonne arrived in Albert Square to give Dot Branning some answers over the sudden appearance of her grandson. Executive producer Dominic Treadwell-Collins expressed his excitement about having another Irish character on the show and commented "I know that viewers are going to both love and be intrigued by Yvonne Cotton." Yvonne departed on 13 January 2015, but made a further appearance on 14 May 2015, to give evidence at Dot's trial for the murder of Nick. McLynn asked the writers of EastEnders not to include any "vocal offers" of tea in a scene, because she did not want it to remind viewers of her Father Ted character. She said "I had cause to give people tea in a time of crisis. I said to them, 'Can we just take out any vocal offer of tea? I'll put the tea in front of them'. I had to come in with the tray and teacups. People thought I was doing this as a nod to Father Ted, but I wasn't. It was in the script!"

Yvonne first appears when her former mother-in-law, Dot, and her friend Shirley Carter (Linda Henry) text her from her son, Charlie's, mobile phone and they agree to meet at the local launderette. They meet and Yvonne and Dot immediately clash, but later get on. She confirms that Charlie is her and Dot's son Nick's, son, after Dot believed that Charlie was lying to her about his identity. When Charlie and Yvonne leave, it is clear that something is suspicious, as Charlie asks whether Dot had believed what Yvonne has said. They also imply that Yvonne has been hurt by a member of Dot's family. Over the next few months, Charlie continues to see Dot and she gets used to having him around. It is revealed that Nick is alive, though Charlie and Yvonne have staged his death. Yvonne asks Charlie to stop seeing Dot, as she thinks that Nick has tracked them down. He agrees to go to Ireland with her, but later decides to move in with Dot, implying that Yvonne has left alone. Several months later, Yvonne returns again and is not very pleased when she finds out that Charlie is engaged to Ronnie Mitchell (Samantha Womack) and that she is pregnant with his child. When Nick returns to Walford and demands money, so that he can leave the country, Yvonne applies for a temporary cleaning job and moves in with Dot and Charlie, to help raise the cash. Dot decides to forgive Charlie for what he has done to her, but reveals to Nick that if he does not leave the country by New Year's Day, then she will hand him into the police. Yvonne and Nick warm to each other again, partly through their hatred of Ronnie. They begin sleeping together in secret, which Dot discovers, but she does not tell Charlie, as she does not want her family to fall apart, once again. When Ronnie suggests that Nick should be locked in his room, so that people do not discover that he is still alive, Yvonne and Dot refuse to go along with it, but Charlie persuades them to go ahead with Ronnie's plan.

On the day of Charlie and Ronnie's wedding, Nick escapes from his room and cuts the brakes of Ronnie's sister, Roxy's (Rita Simons) car, as revenge against Ronnie, who wants her cousin, Phil (Steve McFadden), to dispose of him. At Charlie and Ronnie's wedding party, Ronnie's waters break, but whilst Roxy is driving them to the hospital, they knock DC Emma Summerhayes (Anna Acton), down, killing her and the car crashes, placing Ronnie in a coma. Charlie and Ronnie's baby is safely delivered and Yvonne is delighted to be a grandmother, but Ronnie is still in a critical condition. The day after the accident, Yvonne discovers what Nick has done, but he convinces her to frame Phil, by putting the oil rag in his coat pocket. Phil is arrested and charged, but after witnessing Charlie beat up Phil's son, Ben (Harry Reid), she tells Charlie the truth about the accident. When Charlie discovers that Nick cut the brakes of Roxy's car and that Yvonne helped to frame Phil, he and Dot order them both to leave. Yvonne tells Charlie how much she loves him before packing her bags and leaving Walford.

Yvonne returns in May 2015 to give evidence against Dot during Nick's murder trial. She attempts to illustrate Dot as an evil, manipulative old lady who wanted Nick dead for years. She also informs the jury of Nick's plot to poison Dot, and suggests that this may be one of her motives to kill him. However, Dot's defence inform the jury of Dot and Charlie throwing Yvonne out of the house after it transpired that she helped frame Phil for the car accident, and they state that Yvonne is a bitter, jealous woman who is holding a petty grudge against Dot for throwing her out. It is also commented that Yvonne stole items from the care home that she used to work at, which damages her reputation. Afterwards, Yvonne meets Charlie in the waiting room and attempts to reconcile with him and tries to manipulate him into living with her again; however, Charlie declines and Yvonne leaves.

Following Ronnie and Roxy's deaths in January 2017, Dot tries to get in touch with Charlie about Matthew and contacts Yvonne to see whether she has been in contact with him.

== Ineta Shirovs ==
Ineta Shirovs
- EastEnders character
- Portrayed by: Octavia Alexandru (2014); Gledisa Osmani (2014–2015)
- Duration: 2014–2015
- First appearance: Episode 4872; 13 June 2014
- Last appearance: Episode 5051; 16 April 2015
- Introduced by: Dominic Treadwell-Collins
In-universe information
- Occupation: Student
- Father: Aleks Shirovs
- Mother: Marta Shirovs

Ineta Shirovs, played by Gledisa Osmani, is the daughter of Aleks Shirovs (Kristian Kiehling). She is first seen speaking to Aleks via a webcam over the internet asking him if he was going to return home to Latvia.

Ineta comes to Walford with her mother, Marta Shirovs (Noeleen Comiskey), to visit her father. Aleks sees them arriving and quickly leaves for a holiday with his girlfriend, Roxy Mitchell (Rita Simons) and her daughter Amy Mitchell (Abbie Knowles). Ineta and Marta visit Aleks' assistant Tamwar Masood (Himesh Patel) who is shocked to realise who they are; Ineta tells Tamwar that she and her mother are looking for Aleks. Ineta and Marta come back when Aleks returns from his holiday, and she reveals that she has been teaching her mother English and showing her the sights of London. Aleks gets Tamwar to take Ineta to the café to keep her occupied. Ineta later asks Aleks if she and Marta can come and live with him but he says that his accommodation is too small, and arranges for them to stay at a B&B away from the square.

Ineta returns with her mother and calls at Roxy's house where Aleks is living and discover Aleks and Roxy's relationship. Marta leaves Ineta with Aleks, telling her that there were better schools in London and could have a better life in England and leaves, returning to Latvia. Roxy throws Aleks out and he and Ineta move into a bedsit and spend Christmas together. Aleks later intends to move away from Walford with Ineta and when Roxy realises that she does not want him to go, she gives him a prospectus for Walford High School, in order for him to enroll Ineta. The couple reconcile and Ineta and Aleks then move in with Roxy and Amy, who is not pleased with Ineta's presence.

Ineta later abducts Roxy's infant nephew Matthew Mitchell-Cotton, who Aleks had been babysitting, and takes him to the hospital where his mother, Roxy's sister Ronnie (Samantha Womack), is in a coma and her husband, Matthew's father Charlie Cotton (Declan Bennett) is keeping a bedside vigil. Ineta later tells Aleks that she wanted to return Matthew to his parents so she could have her father back. Aleks realises that he has been neglecting Ineta and she tells him that she is being bullied at school. Ineta later refuses to go to school and Roxy discovers bruises on her arms and Ineta tells her that the bullying was getting worse and that she had hit the girl who was bullying her and Roxy comforts her. When the girl's mother confronts Ineta, Roxy defends her and punches the woman, bringing her and Ineta closer as a result. Ineta is happy when her mother attends her birthday party. Two days later, after Aleks has been discovered to be stealing from the Market Traders, he makes plans to flee and Ineta calls Marta and tells her what is happening. Aleks reunites with Marta and Ineta leaves with her parents back to Latvia.

== Gianluca Cavallo ==
Gianluca Cavallo
- EastEnders character
- Portrayed by: Gabriele Lombardo
- First appearance: Episode 4880; 27 June 2014
- Last appearance: Episode 4887; 10 July 2014
- Introduced by: Dominic Treadwell-Collins

Gianluca Cavallo, played by Gabriele Lombardo, appears in three episodes between 27 June and 10 July 2014. Johnny Carter (Sam Strike) meets Gianluca outside a gay pub in Soho where they start chatting and agree to attend Pride London together the next day. They stay in contact via text message. Johnny later invites Gianluca to his mother Linda Carter's (Kellie Bright) birthday party at The Queen Victoria public house. Gianluca reveals that he is returning home to Italy the following morning and suggests making their last night together an enjoyable one. At the pub, Johnny introduces Gianluca to his family. Johnny then loses his virginity to Gianluca. As Gianluca is leaving, Linda tells him he is welcome back anytime. Johnny walks Gianluca to the tube station and kisses him goodbye. He briefly considers going with Gianluca to Italy but Gianluca tells him to stay as his life is in London, and Johnny bids him farewell. However, in December, Johnny contacts Gianluca and asks to stay with him for a while. Johnny later reveals to his family that he is going to go travelling with Gianluca and he leaves on a motorbike soon after. When Johnny (now played by Ted Reilly) returns two years later, it is revealed that he has broken up with Gianluca.

Images of Johnny and Gianluca's first scenes emerged in June 2014. They were filmed on location outside the Duke of Wellington pub in Soho, with a gay pride event being recreated and the pub being filled with extras. All About Soap thought Gianluca looked "perfect" for Johnny, but said "his dress sense leaves a bit to be desired." The Daily Star welcomed the kiss between Johnny and Gianluca, as an earlier kiss between Johnny and Danny Pennant (Gary Lucy) had received complaints. An EastEnders insider said: "After Johnny meets Gianluca they have a full-on fling [...] and Johnny really falls for him. [...] He's so loved up that it doesn't take his family long to work out what's going on and he has no choice but to bring Gianluca home to meet them all. Johnny is on cloud nine and hasn't been this happy in months." The storyline received homophobic comments from a small minority of viewers before it had been broadcast.

== Chris Skinner ==
Reverend Chris Skinner
- Eastenders character
- Portrayed by: Mark Letheren
- First appearance: Episode 4898; 29 July 2014
- Last appearance: Episode 4918; 4 September 2014
- Introduced by: Dominic Treadwell-Collins
In-universe information
- Occupation: Hospital chaplain

The Reverend Chris Skinner, played by Mark Letheren, made his first screen appearance on 29 July 2014. Chris is a hospital chaplain who talks to Carol Jackson (Lindsey Coulson) when she is in hospital for a double mastectomy. Carol admits she is scared, so Chris shows her an operation scar and explains he spent 10 weeks in hospital once following a motorbike accident, and he encourages her to pray. He visits Carol after her operation and she thanks him for his support. Carol sees him again whilst waiting at the hospital for her final appointment and he offers to listen to her if she wants to talk to someone. After Carol receives her results which are positive, she returns to the hospital and finds Chris just as he is leaving and thanks him again for supporting her. She gets upset and Chris comforts her and does his best to reassure her. He then gives her a bible to consult if she has any worries in the future.

Kate White from Inside Soap praised the character, saying "There's no doubt Carol had a rotten week – but at least she got a shoulder to cry on from a properly sexy vicar. Who says the Lord wasn't listening? We hope to see more of him!" White later branded Chris "the Hipster Hospital Vicar".

== Bert and Ernie Moon ==
Bert and Ernie Moon
- EastEnders character
- Portrayed by: Freddie and Stanley Beale (2014–2016); Elliot and Cody Briffett (2018–present)
- Duration: 2014–2016, 2018–present
- First appearance: Episode 4904; 8 August 2014
- Introduced by: Dominic Treadwell-Collins (2014); John Yorke (2018)
- Spin-off appearances: EastEnders: The Podcast (2018)
In-universe information
- Family: Slater/Moon
- Father: Alfie Moon
- Mother: Kat Slater
- Stepfather: Phil Mitchell
- Half-brothers: Dermott Dolan; Tommy Moon
- Half-sisters: Zoe Slater; Cherry Slater
- Grandfathers: Alfred Moon; Charlie Slater
- Grandmothers: Cherry Moon; Viv Slater
- Uncles: Spencer Moon
- Aunts: Lynne Hobbs; Belinda Peacock; Little Mo Mitchell
- Nephews: Josh Goodwin
- Nieces: Jasmine Fisher
- First cousins: Freddie Slater
- Other relatives: Mo Harris; Harry Slater; Sean Slater; Stacey Slater; Lily Slater; Arthur Fowler; Hope Fowler; Hayley Slater; Michael Moon; Tommy Moon; Scarlett Butcher; Charli Slater

Bert Moon and Ernie Moon, are the twin sons of Alfie Moon (Shane Richie) and Kat Moon (Jessie Wallace). They were played by Freddie and Stanley Beale from 2014 to 2016. On 25 November 2018, it was announced Bert and Ernie, and their half-brother, Tommy Moon, would be returning. Bert is played by Elliot Briffett, and Ernie by Cody Briffett.

They are born on 8 August 2014, though the first baby to be born is not breathing and has to be resuscitated. During the pregnancy the babies are nicknamed "Bert and Ernie" after The Muppets, and although Kat insists the names are temporary Alfie eventually wins her round and they decide to register them as Albert and Ernest when they are unable to come up with alternative names. When the twins are one month old their home is burned down by Alfie as part of an insurance scam; this results in Kat being badly burned and spending a month apart from the twins to recuperate in hospital. Their parents later separate when the twins are four months old after Kat finds out Alfie was responsible for the fire and as a result they move in with Kat's cousin Stacey Branning (Lacey Turner), her daughter Lily (Aine Garvey), and their great-grandmother Mo Harris (Laila Morse). Their parents reunite and after they win the lottery Kat and Alfie relocate to Spain with the twins and their older half-brother Tommy Moon (Ralfie White/Shay Crotty/Sonny Kendall). They return briefly with the family in December 2015 and January 2016. In 2018, Kat returns from Spain and though she misses the children, she ignores Alfie's calls. It is revealed that Ernie was scalded by hot water while Kat was having an affair, and Alfie blamed Kat and sent her back to England, but did not know about the affair at the time.

It was reported on 22 July 2014 that the babies would be named Bert and Ernie, after the Muppets characters. Sarah Deen from the Metro said of the twins' arrival: "The lovely scene with Kat and Alfie cuddling their healthy newborn sons is probably the most positive thing EastEnders viewers have seen in months. The mass outpouring of love on Twitter for two fictional characters was quite something."

Bert and Ernie do not appear in the spin-off series Kat & Alfie: Redwater, in which Kat and Alfie travel to Ireland, because Dominic Treadwell-Collins knew that having two small children in the series would have "limited Kat and Alfie and they wouldn't have been able to do as much", though revealed that they were originally due to appear, but "suddenly you ended up having storylines about who is looking after the twins and on a show like this we needed to tell other stories" and confirmed that Kat and Alfie have only left them for a few weeks and check on them during the series.

== Beth Williams ==
Beth Williams
- EastEnders character
- Portrayed by: Uncredited
- Duration: 2014–2015
- First appearance: Episode 4915; 28 August 2014
- Last appearance: Episode 5080; 5 June 2015
- Introduced by: Dominic Treadwell-Collins
In-universe information
- Family: Beale
- Father: TJ Spraggan
- Mother: Cindy Williams
- Grandfathers: Terry Spraggan; Nick Holland
- Grandmothers: Nikki Spraggan; Cindy Beale
- Uncles: Peter Beale; Steven Beale
- Aunts: Lucy Beale; Rosie Spraggan; Gina Knight; Anna Knight
- First cousins: Louie Beale; Abi Branning
- Other relatives: Bev Williams; Gina Williams

Beth Williams is the daughter of Cindy Williams (Mimi Keene) and TJ Spraggan (George Sargeant). Her first appearance is in the episode broadcast on 28 August 2014 and her last is on 5 June 2015.

Beth is born in late August 2014 and is delivered by Ian Beale (Adam Woodyatt) in the Beale household, and for the first few months of her life, Cindy bonds with her well, but struggles with motherhood after a few months. Cindy admits to Liam Butcher (James Forde) that she does not miss Beth while she is away with Ian and his wife Jane Beale (Laurie Brett), who Cindy lives with. When Cindy looks after Beth, she cannot cope with her crying and leaves her in the park. Cindy later returns but Beth is gone but is later found with Liam as he found her and took her home. Feeling that Cindy needs a change, Jane drops Cindy and Beth off at Masood Ahmed's (Nitin Ganatra) house and admits to the Masood family that she abandoned Beth. Shabnam Masood (Rakhee Thakrar) tells Cindy that she has to think of what is best for her too and when Jane collects Cindy and Beth, Cindy says she wants Beth adopted. Ian and Jane plan to adopt Beth and Cindy initially agrees, but struggles to cope with the idea of her daughter becoming her sister and also worries that she will still be asked to look after Beth, so changes her mind. She tells Ian and Jane to drop their case to adopt Beth or she will tell everyone that their son Bobby Beale (Eliot Carrington) killed their half-sister Lucy Beale (Hetti Bywater). Jane arranges for Beth to live with TJ so he can become a father and Beth is collected by TJ's father, Terry Spraggan (Terry Alderton) to live in Milton Keynes. Cindy's behaviour results in an enraged Ian throwing her out onto the streets.

== Tom Pepper ==
Tom Pepper
- EastEnders character
- Portrayed by: Tristam Summers
- Duration: 2014–2017
- First appearance: Episode 4936; 3 October 2014
- Last appearance: Episode 5432; 26 January 2017
- Introduced by: Dominic Treadwell-Collins
In-universe information
- Occupation: Paramedic

Tom Pepper, played by Tristam Summers, is a paramedic who has appeared in 11 episodes since 3 October 2014. The character is initially unnamed until 30 October 2015. Inside Soap speculated that Tom could become a full-time character as he had been given a name, a friend in Sonia Fowler (Natalie Cassidy) and less clothes to wear, referring to his scenes dressed as a gladiator.

In Tom's first appearance, he treats Phil Mitchell (Steve McFadden) after he is shot by Shirley Carter (Linda Henry). On New Year's Day 2015, he tends to a pregnant Ronnie Mitchell (Samantha Womack) after she is injured in a car crash and she begs him to save her baby first over her. In April, he treats Kat Moon (Jessie Wallace) after she overdoses on painkillers in a suicide attempt. In October, along with his colleague, Holly, he takes Stacey Branning (Lacey Turner) to hospital after she suffers an electric shock at her flat. In January 2016, Tom treats Charlie Slater (Derek Martin) when he suffers a heart attack, but he is unable to save Charlie and he dies. In March, Tom is called to The Queen Victoria pub when Ollie Carter stops breathing and suffers a seizure. In April, Tom takes part in the Walford half marathon dressed as a gladiator, running with nurse Sonia and her girlfriend Tina Carter (Luisa Bradshaw-White). Tom helps give Tina first aid after she injures her ankle. Before Tom attends the Pride of Walford Awards, he gives Johnny Carter (Ted Reilly) his mobile number. He then attends the awards where he, Sonia and their colleagues win an award after raising money for charity from the half marathon. He later treats Jane Beale (Laurie Brett) after she is assaulted by her adoptive son Bobby Beale (Eliot Carrington), who has beaten her with a hockey stick. Tom reveals to Jane's husband Ian Beale (Adam Woodyatt) that she has suffered spinal injuries which are making breathing difficult and calls for spinal specialist surgeons to be ready at the hospital for their arrival. Tom then treats Babe Smith (Annette Badland) after she is locked in the freezer at The Queen Vic overnight, and rushes her to hospital. In January 2017, Tom treats Whitney Carter (Shona McGarty) after she is trapped under a bus that crashes into the market and the viaduct.

== Elaine Peacock ==
Elaine Peacock is the mother of Linda Carter (Kellie Bright) and played by Maria Friedman until 2017. She comes to The Queen Victoria pub following her daughter's rape by Dean Wicks (Matt Di Angelo). She is described as being larger than life, glamorous, and loves to be the centre of attention, and has a 'fraught' relationship with her daughter due to their similar personalities. Friedman initially signed up for a guest stint, with Elaine appearing from October to December 2014. The character returned for another guest stint from February to March 2015 and returned for three months from September 2015 to January 2016. She returned for a single episode in March 2016. The character made an unannounced one–off return on 30 June 2017. On 28 March 2023, it was announced that Elaine would be returning as the new landlady of the Queen Vic with the role recast to Harriet Thorpe. Elaine returned on 10 May 2023.

== Kush Kazemi ==
Khouroush "Kush" Kazemi, played by Davood Ghadami, made his first appearance on 20 October 2014. He is a friend of Martin Fowler (James Bye). The character and casting were announced on 19 August 2014, when it was said the character was a "good guy" who is "funny and full of energy". He is said to have a "brash exterior" underneath which hides "a tragic past that he is keen to escape from". Ghadami said of his casting, "I'm so excited to be joining the cast of EastEnders as I've been a fan of the show for as long as I can remember." The name Kush is short for Khoroush. It was confirmed on 26 September 2020 that Ghadami would be leaving the show in the new year with his final scenes airing in April 2021. Kush was killed off on 19 April 2021 after being pushed in front of an oncoming train by Gray Atkins (Toby-Alexander Smith).

== Buster Briggs ==
Buster Briggs
- EastEnders character
- Portrayed by: Karl Howman
- Duration: 2014–2016
- First appearance: Episode 4961; 18 November 2014
- Last appearance: Episode 5356; 23 September 2016
- Introduced by: Dominic Treadwell-Collins
In-universe information
- Occupation: Market stall holder
- Sons: Mick Carter; Dean Wicks
- Grandsons: Lee Carter; Johnny Carter; Ollie Carter
- Granddaughters: Frankie Lewis; Nancy Carter; Jade Masood

Andrew "Buster" Briggs, played by Karl Howman, is the father of Mick Carter (Danny Dyer) and Dean Wicks (Matt Di Angelo), the sons of Shirley Carter (Linda Henry). He made his first appearance on 18 November 2014, credited only as "Biker". He departed on 23 September 2016.

In his second episode, Buster is revealed as a convict serving time in a prison. On a day release, he stays overnight in Shirley's caravan, but is unknowingly kidnapped when Mick and Dean tow the caravan away, believing Shirley to be inside. In Walford, after talking with Buster about his longtime association with the Carters, Dean works it out that Buster is his father. They bond and plan with Shirley to escape together. Mick alerts the authorities and Buster is arrested for not reporting back after his day release and is given a month's extra prison sentence. Buster then realises that Mick is his son as well. Buster later returns to Walford on with Dean and explains that Dean visited him in prison and that after he got released, he booked a one-way ticket to Greece for him, Shirley and Dean to start a new life together. Later, when Dean decides to visit his grandfather, Stan Carter (Timothy West), at the hospital, Buster takes him there, while Shirley packs at home. When the police arrive at the hospital and arrest Dean for breaking bail conditions following his arrest for raping Mick's fiancée Linda Carter (Kellie Bright), Buster thinks that Mick called them, and confronts him and Linda the next day. When they explain that they did not call the police, Buster works out that it was, in fact, Shirley who called the police, and confronts her at home. Furious, he goes to the train station to leave for Greece alone, where Mick and Linda's children, Nancy Carter (Maddy Hill) and Lee Carter (Danny-Boy Hatchard), follow him and explain that they need to be there for Stan. Later that night, Buster unexpectedly shows up at Shirley's flat, having had a change of heart and deciding to be there for Dean. He subsequently visits and supports Dean throughout his time in prison, informing him when Stan dies and helps keep Dean's salon, Blades, afloat with Shirley. After Dean is released without charge, Shirley's aunt Babe Smith (Annette Badland) organises a party for him in Blades, during which a man throws a brick through the window. Buster discovers that Babe paid the man, so he visits Babe at the Carters' pub, The Queen Victoria, and pours her trifle over her head. When Mick's son Ollie Carter is born, Buster begins to bond with Mick when he helps him build a cot. Buster discovers that he has another grandchild from Dean and Shabnam Masood (Rakhee Thakrar). Upon discovering that she has cystic fibrosis, Dean breaks down in Buster's arms. After Dean attacks his fiancée Roxy Mitchell (Rita Simons), Buster realises he is a rapist and disowns him. He later visits him in prison where he and Shirley warn him not to contact them and Buster says that he has friends in prison that could make Dean's life hell. When Ian Beale (Adam Woodyatt) decides to sell his restaurant to a supermarket chain, Buster leads a campaign to stop from him selling, during which he and Ian's mother, Kathy Sullivan (Gillian Taylforth), become attracted to each other. Buster later propositions Kathy for a secret relationship as he believes he is with the wrong woman and begins secretly meeting her without telling Shirley. When he sees Kathy's estranged husband Gavin Sullivan (Paul Nicholas) take Kathy in his car, he tells Gavin's daughter Sharon Mitchell (Letitia Dean), and fearing for Kathy's safety, they go to Gavin's address. When they get there, a woman falls from the balcony onto the car and lies dead on the ground, and Buster thinks it is Kathy. However, it is Gavin's sister Margaret Midhurst (Jan Harvey), and Buster finds Kathy hiding in one of the rooms and helps her escape Gavin's house. Later, Kathy tells Buster she needs to end their relationship because she feels things between them are getting too serious. However, they passionately kiss and are seen by Kathy's former husband Phil Mitchell (Steve McFadden). They start to see each other secretly and eventually sleep together. However, when Kathy and Phil's son Ben Mitchell (Harry Reid) is attacked in a homophobic attack, she ends the affair, leaving Buster heartbroken. Lee realises Buster is cheating on Shirley and tells Mick, who confronts Buster, but Buster does not reveal Kathy's identity. Mick urges Buster to confess to Shirley or he will have nothing to do with him any more. Realising that he no longer loves Shirley, Buster opts for the latter and decides to leave Walford with Kathy. However, she leaves Buster heartbroken again when she chooses to remain with her family, so Buster leaves alone.

== Sylvie Carter ==
Sylvie Carter
- EastEnders character
- Portrayed by: Linda Marlowe
- Duration: 2014–2017
- First appearance: Episode 4974; 11 December 2014
- Last appearance: Episode 5467; 30 March 2017
- Introduced by: Dominic Treadwell-Collins
In-universe information
- Mother: Edna Smith
- Sisters: Babe Smith
- Husband: Stan Carter (until 2015)
- Daughters: Shirley Carter; Tina Carter
- Grandsons: Mick Carter; Dean Wicks; Jimbo Wicks
- Granddaughters: Carly Wicks; Zsa Zsa Carter
- Other relatives: Frankie Lewis; Lee Carter; Nancy Carter; Johnny Carter; Ollie Carter

Sylvie Carter, portrayed by Linda Marlowe, is the ex-wife of Stan Carter (Timothy West) and the mother of Shirley (Linda Henry) and Tina Carter (Luisa Bradshaw-White). Sylvie was also thought to be the mother of her grandson, Mick Carter (Danny Dyer), until May 2014. She initially appeared in 11 episodes, from 11 December 2014 to 22 January 2015, which later extended to 14 episodes, due to three further appearances on 10, 23 and 24 April 2015. Sylvie returned for a single episode on 1 January 2016 for Mick's wedding to Linda Carter (Kellie Bright), before reappearing as a regular from 14 June 2016 until the character's death on 30 March 2017.

Laura-Jayne Tyler of Inside Soap praised the 2017 scene where Sylvie told Tina about her childhood abuse, saying, "all praise to EastEnders for the beautifully written and acted scene where Sylvie recalled her brutal treatment at the hands of her mum. Bravo to all."

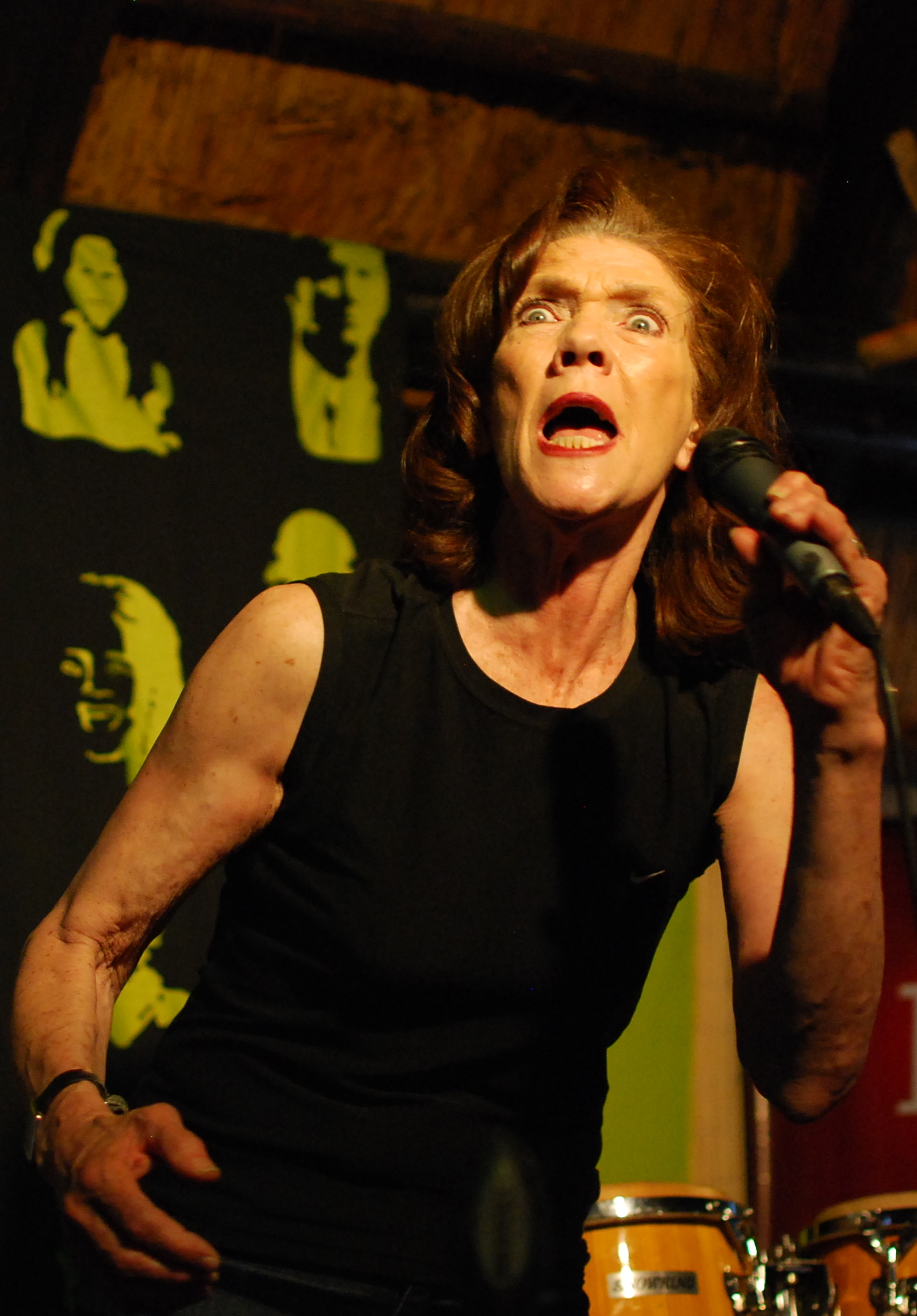
Linda Marlowe portrayed Sylvie Carter from 2014 to 2017.

Sylvie is first mentioned in January 2014, when Stan and Shirley reminisce about she left them when they were children, over 30 years ago. In December 2014, Shirley and Mick visit their aunt, Sylvie's sister, Babe Smith (Annette Badland), and discover that she has been living with her, since her diagnosis of Alzheimer's disease, five years previously. Although she is still hostile towards Shirley, she takes a shine to Mick and when he cannot get hold of Babe, he and Shirley take Sylvie back to their home in Walford. Babe is angry to discover this, especially when she goes missing and when Sylvie is found, Babe takes her home. On Christmas Eve, Mick, Shirley and Babe take Sylvie out for lunch, to which Mick gets her a present, but Sylvie remains hostile to Shirley. At the end of the meal, Sylvie tells Mick that she wants to spend Christmas with him and his family and Babe brings her to their public house, The Queen Victoria, the following day, upsetting Stan. When Stan learns the truth about Mick's parentage, as he is Shirley's biological son, he blames Babe, who then abandons Sylvie and she moves in with them. Later, Stan attempts to talk to Sylvie, but she ignores him and this causes him to snap at her. When Babe eventually decides to take Sylvie home, she informs Stan that he did make her happy, before leaving, returning briefly for a dance party at the local community centre, where she kisses Stan. Babe is angry that Sylvie has left home, without her permission and also reveals that she had a crush on Stan, before him and Sylvie became a couple. When Babe announces that she is struggling to take care of Sylvie and that she is going to put her into a care home, they arrange a leaving party for her and her and Stan reminisce, about how they used to love each other. When Shirley sits down and explains to Mick why she could not be a mother to him, revealing that it was Sylvie and Babe's fault, as they tried to cause her to miscarry, by pushing her down the stairs, and would not even let her hold him, when she had just given birth to him, he disowns them.

In April 2015, Babe takes Sylvie to see Stan, who is terminally ill with prostate cancer, in a hospice, in the hope of causing trouble between him and his new fiancée, Cora Cross (Ann Mitchell). However, Stan and Sylvie admit to each other that they made the right decision to separate and take off each other's wedding rings, before saying an emotional goodbye. Sylvie later appears when Babe returns from Stan's funeral and reveals to Sylvie that Stan has died. It transpires that Babe did not tell Sylvie about Stan's death straight away, because she wanted to attend his funeral without her. When Sylvie tries to visit the rest of the Carter family to comfort them, Babe becomes hostile and orders her to stay put. When Sylvie exclaims that no man would ever love her, Babe slaps her and she then pretends to be upset and holds her cheek in pain, leading to Babe hugging her, only for Sylvie to bite her neck as revenge for slapping her. Sylvie then tries to call the police on Babe, as she and Queenie Trott (Judy Cornwell) broke the law when they lived in Ramsgate. Babe then manipulates Sylvie into not going through with it.

Tina brings Sylvie to Mick and Linda's wedding, though Shirley is angry about this. When asked, Sylvie does not remember why she is there and after being told, she then mistakes Mick's eldest son Lee Carter (Danny-Boy Hatchard) for Mick. In June, Sylvie is escorted to The Queen Vic by the police because she was found and would only say the name of the pub. Sylvie's social worker visits and reveals that Sylvie has made unwanted sexual advances to other residents at her care home, though the home would welcome her back. The Carters decide the home is not good enough and try to find a new one, but Sylvie is not considered a priority case, so they are forced to look after her. Linda becomes worried for the safety of her infant son Ollie Carter when Sylvie calls him a slug and threatens to pour salt on him, so Tina allows Sylvie to move in with her and her girlfriend Sonia Fowler (Natalie Cassidy), which Sonia finds difficult adapting to. After Babe is locked in the freezer at The Queen Vic, Sylvie makes a trifle and attempts to replace Babe's status in the family. Babe's memory from the attack eventually returns, and tells Mick and Linda that it was Sylvie who locked her in the freezer. After Sylvie seemingly confesses to attacking Babe and arguing with Shirley, it is revealed that Abi Branning (Lorna Fitzgerald) was the real culprit, with Babe framing Sylvie in an attempt to have her sent back to a care home. Eventually, Sonia breaks up with Tina and moves to Kettering, so Tina and Sylvie move out of the house and in with Shirley, after her relationship with Buster Briggs (Karl Howman) ends.

Babe looks after Sylvie, who insults Babe, so Babe convinces her they are meeting Stan and takes her in the rain to a canal, leaving her there. Sylvie is later found and brought back home, where she is scared of Babe. Babe denies any involvement but eventually rants that she is more family than Sylvie and rants at Sylvie, saying she should have drowned. Mick ejects Babe from the pub and tells her never to return, which delights Sylvie. Soon, Tina realises Shirley is tricking Sylvie into sleeping for most of the day to avoid caring for her. Shirley admits she is struggling and Sylvie should go into care, but Tina insists she belongs with them. Tina insists on celebrating Sylvie's 75th birthday, though Shirley says she will not remember and it will be a waste of time. On Sylvie's birthday, Sylvie is unaware of what is going on and Shirley says that her dementia is getting worse. The next day, Sylvie shares a memory with Shirley and Tina about her mother being abusive towards her, leaving Shirley angry because Sylvie was abusive to her. Tina accuses Shirley of avoiding the flat and her responsibility towards Sylvie, so Shirley walks out. Shirley then decides to go to prison to solve the Carters' debt problems, and as a way to avoid caring for Sylvie. A few days later, Tina leaves Sylvie at the café while she and Mick visit Shirley in prison. On their return, a confused Sylvie is attacking Kathy Beale (Gillian Taylforth), so Tina considers care for Sylvie, which scares Sylvie. A few days later, Tina leaves Sylvie alone most of the day and when she gets home, Sylvie is in the bath and scared. Kathy realises that Tina hates the idea of someone else caring for Sylvie and makes her realise that it is what is best for Sylvie, so Tina makes a call about getting her into a care home. The day before Sylvie is due to be assessed by social services, Tina, Johnny Carter (Ted Reilly) and Whitney Dean (Shona McGarty) arrange a 1960s-themed party for her in The Queen Vic. Sylvie has a moment of clarity when some men harass Tina in the pub and she defends her daughter, but later she tells Tina, believing her to be a stranger, that she was a bad mother but never stopped loving her children, despite not knowing where they are now; Tina cries. Sylvie enjoys the party, and at the end of the night, Tina puts her to bed with a CD. Sylvie wakes in the night, confused, and runs herself a bath, taking the CD player with her, plugged into the mains. After The Queen Vic closes, the power goes out, so Tina, Johnny and Whitney investigate, and Tina is distraught to find Sylvie electrocuted in the bath.

== Other characters ==
Character	Date(s)	Actor	Circumstances
Garvey	17 January	Thomas Aldridge	A builder who informs the Carters they have a severe case of rising damp in the barrel store of The Queen Victoria public house.
Mr Brewer	24 January	Uncredited	An environmental health officer who arrives at The Queen Victoria public house following complaints about their meat. The next week he tells Linda Carter (Kellie Bright) that the meat is lamb, though the Carters suspected it might be dog.
Verity	10–11 February (2 episodes)	Saskia Butler	The owner of a salon which is frequented by Stacey Branning (Lacey Turner). When Kat Moon (Jessie Wallace) sees Stacey going inside, she questions Verity on Stacey's whereabouts but Verity refuses to give her any information. The next day, Max Branning (Jake Wood) poses as an IT technician and prints off the salon's customer details behind Verity's back.
Shelley Cram	11 February	Jane Jeffery	Janine Butcher's (Charlie Brooks) solicitor, who informs Ian Beale (Adam Woodyatt) that Janine is selling her share of their restaurant, Scarlett's. She then tells Danny Pennant (Gary Lucy) and Lucy Beale (Hetti Bywater) that Janine is closing her property business, Butcher's Joints, leaving them both unemployed.
Muneer	13 February	Nicholas Prasad	A man who Shabnam Masood (Rakhee Thakrar) meets online. They meet in Scarlett's for a date but he ditches her when she talks too much, leaving Fatboy (Ricky Norwood) to break the news to a distraught Shabnam.
Sandra Dinsdale	25 February 2014– 17 April 2015 (4 episodes)	Donna Combe	A prison guard present when Stacey Branning (Lacey Turner) and Kat Moon (Jessie Wallace) visit Janine Butcher (Charlie Brooks) in prison. Later, she escorts Stacey, now a prisoner herself, to the hospital when she visits her mother Jean Slater (Gillian Wright). She later appears when Charlie Cotton (Declan Bennett) visits his grandmother Dot Branning (June Brown) in prison and when Max Branning (Jake Wood) and Carol Jackson (Lindsey Coulson) visit Dot the same day.
Nicole	17–20 March	Tamsin Caroll	A woman who Alfie Moon (Shane Richie) conned in Australia. She arrives in Albert Square and takes back the fast-food van, which was worth £15,000, that he had tricked her into giving him. This leaves Alfie and Jake Stone (Jamie Lomas) out of work.
Tim Stevens	24 March–20 May	Joe Claflin	The vicar who conducts the funerals of Nick Cotton (John Altman) and Lucy Beale (Hetti Bywater). Tim is the nephew of regular vicar Reverend Stevens (Michael Keating).
Curtis	24 March	Winston Showan	A barman hired by Sharon Rickman (Letitia Dean) to work at her new wine bar, The Albert.
Dr Rose Sutton	11 April 2014– 31 March 2017 (3 episodes)	Sakuntala Ramanee	A doctor who treats Lola Pearce (Danielle Harold) after she is run over by a car driven by Ronnie Mitchell (Samantha Womack). She assumes that Ronnie is Lola's mother. She then tells Lola that she needs to stay in hospital overnight. Two years later, she treats Phil Mitchell (Steve McFadden) after he collapses after being assaulted by a gang who kidnapped his son Ben Mitchell (Harry Reid). She tells Phil's wife Sharon Mitchell (Letitia Dean) that Phil's liver is not producing enough clotting agents to stop his bleeding and he needs a CT scan to find out if he is suffering from bleeding on the brain. When Michelle Fowler (Jenna Russell) is involved in a car crash, Dr Sutton informs Michelle's brother, Martin Fowler (James Bye), of how Michelle's operation went and that they have spared some of her spleen, which was damaged.
Marvin	14 April	Elroy Spoonface Powell (uncredited)	A trader from Spring Lane market who arrived with Donna Yates (Lisa Hammond), Shrimpy (Ben Champniss) and Pam Coker (Lin Blakley).
Maude	21 April	Rhiannon Hall	A young girl who discovers the body of Lucy Beale (Hetti Bywater) when walking through Walford Common with her grandfather.
DCI Irving	24 April	Colin McFarlane	A police officer in charge of the investigation into Lucy Beale's (Hetti Bywater) death. He arrives at the Beale household and explains that forensics will need to examine Lucy's bedroom. He questions Lucy's father Ian Beale (Adam Woodyatt) and her half-sister Cindy Williams (Mimi Keene), and learns that Lucy was a user of cocaine. Off screen, Irving is assigned to another division and DI Samantha Keeble (Alison Newman) takes over from him.
DS Holt	25 April–22 May	Shaun Prendergast	A police officer investigating the murder of Lucy Beale (Hetti Bywater). He questions Lauren Branning (Jacqueline Jossa) along with DC Emma Summerhayes (Anna Acton) about Lucy's last known movements, the night she was killed. He later informs the Beales that her former lover Danny Pennant (Gary Lucy) has an alibi for the night of her death. He is later approached by Lauren about an anonymous email Lucy responded to the night she died, but Holt tells her they are already investigating the matter. The week after, Holt arrests Jake Stone (Jamie Lomas) on suspicion of murder and questions him along with DC Summerhayes. Holt later speaks to Max Branning (Jake Wood) after it is revealed that he was having a secret relationship with Lucy. Holt tells Max that he is not a suspect in the investigation.
Helen	2 May	Gina Murray	A wig specialist who visits Carol Jackson (Lindsey Coulson) to provide her with a wig after undergoing chemotherapy for breast cancer.
Nurse Beth	5 May 2014– 1 January 2015 (4 episodes)	Johanne Murdock	A nurse who looks after a cancer-stricken Carol Jackson (Lindsey Coulson) after she collapses in the middle of Albert Square. She later treats Alfie Moon (Shane Richie) for burns after he is injured in a fire at his home. She also treats a pregnant Ronnie Mitchell (Samantha Womack) after she is injured in a car crash and helps deliver her baby.
Rajinder Singh	29 May	Narinder Samra	A chemist who Ian Beale (Adam Woodyatt) orders a prescription of sleeping tablets from.
Mr Frank Cavendish	30 May 2014– 30 June 2015 (4 episodes)	Simon Hepworth	A consultant who informs Carol Jackson (Lindsey Coulson) that she has responded well to treatment for her breast cancer. He later talks Carol and her daughter Bianca Butcher (Patsy Palmer) through the details of her mastectomy operation and the other options available. He later examines Carol at her last hospital appointment and he reveals to Carol, Bianca and Carol's other daughter Sonia Fowler (Natalie Cassidy) that the chemotherapy has worked and that the cancer has gone and Carol has made a full recovery. He appears again when Carol attends a check-up appointment. After examining Carol, he tells her that there is no sign of the cancer returning. He then puts forward the suggestion of breast reconstructive surgery but Carol turns down the offer and leaves.
Arsim Kelmendi	13 June 2014– 21 July 2015 (4 episodes)	Tomasz Aleksander	An unlicensed taxi driver who drove Lucy Beale (Hetti Bywater) and Jake Stone (Jamie Lomas) to George Street on the night that Lucy was murdered. He tells Lauren Branning (Jacqueline Jossa) that Jake was too drunk to stand and he advised Lucy to leave him in the gutter. He later comes forward as a witness and tells the police he saw Ben Mitchell (Harry Reid) with Lucy the night she died, and identifies him from a video line-up. DI Samantha Keeble (Alison Newman) promises to help with his immigration tribunal appeal, and as they discuss this, Arsim witnesses Max Branning (Jake Wood) arrive at the police station and tells Keeble that he also saw Max with Lucy on the night of her death. He explains to Keeble and DCI Jill Marsden (Sophie Stanton) that he saw Max help Lucy take Jake back to his flat and Marsden tells Keeble to take a statement from him.
Gary Hardcastle	13–16 June	Gary Finan	One of the bouncers hired by Phil Mitchell (Steve McFadden) for The Albert bar. Sharon Rickman (Letitia Dean) disapproves of their presence after they frighten employee Johnny Carter (Sam Strike). Whilst working, Gary hassles Nancy Carter (Maddy Hill) and intimidates Johnny into giving him free alcohol, leading to Sharon firing both bouncers.
Nurse Varley	17 June	Sam Alexander	A nurse who treats Sharon Rickman (Letitia Dean) in hospital after she is assaulted. He explains to her partner Phil Mitchell (Steve McFadden) that Sharon has ruptured her spleen and must be taken for surgery.
Reza Khan	20 June	Pasha Bocarie	A doctor who treats Sharon Rickman (Letitia Dean) at the hospital, following her assault. He tells Sharon's partner Phil Mitchell (Steve McFadden) that they managed to stop the bleed on her brain during surgery and that she was now in a stable condition. He later tells Sharon that she will be transferred to a general ward.
Dr Hugh Thompson	24 June 2014– 18 April 2016 (2 episodes)	Mark Cameron	Johnny Carter's (Sam Strike) university tutor who is met by Johnny's mother Linda Carter (Kellie Bright) after he fails some of his modules. Linda believes there must be a mistake but Hugh assures her that he marked the papers correctly and refuses to discuss exam results with anyone other than Johnny. Two years later, Hugh visits Johnny (now played by Ted Reilly) at home after he returns from Italy and tells him that he will not be able to sit his exams due to missing too many lectures. He leaves and Johnny follows him to the tube station and begs him for another chance, telling Hugh that he grew up whilst away and knows that he definitely wants to be a lawyer. Hugh changes his mind and allows Johnny to continue with his studies.
Mr Turner	3 July	Sean Blowers	A bailiff who visits Bianca Butcher (Patsy Palmer) and Carol Jackson (Lindsey Coulson). He shows little sympathy towards Carol, who has been diagnosed with breast cancer, and is only interested in getting the money that Bianca took from the loan company.
Ali, Gerard and Philip	15 July	Uncredited	Ali is a make-up artist, Gerard is her assistant and Philip is a photographer, who all arrive for a photoshoot at Dean Wicks' (Matt Di Angelo) salon, Blades.
Dr Callow	18 July	Max Dowler	A doctor who prescribes Sharon Rickman (Letitia Dean) pills for her anxiety, as he believes she is suffering from post-traumatic stress disorder following an attack that left her severely injured.
Kate Hughes	25 July	Nimmy March	A woman from Walford Children's Services who visits Bianca Butcher (Patsy Palmer) after her daughter Tiffany Butcher (Maisie Smith) brings brownies into school with marijuana baked into them. Bianca's son Liam Butcher (James Forde) tells Kate that he found the cakes. Kate says the matter will be passed onto the police.
PC Gregg Preston	5 August 2014– 8 June 2018 (7 episodes)	Matt Slack	A police officer who arrests Mick Carter (Danny Dyer) for soliciting the services of a prostitute, after seeing him speaking to Rainie Cross (Tanya Franks). After Sylvie Carter (Linda Marlowe) dies from electrocution in The Queen Victoria public house, PC Preston attends the scene and does not let Whitney Carter (Shona McGarty) or Johnny Carter (Ted Reilly) back into the pub until the forensic team have finished. He is seen again, policing a demonstration against council cuts held during the Walford in Bloom competition, attended by the mayor and several other local dignitaries. A gas explosion then occurs, injuring several people, and Preston assists with the rescue efforts. On Boxing Day, Preston appears when sisters Lauren (Jacqueline Jossa) and Abi Branning (Lorna Fitzgerald) fall from the roof of The Queen Vic and are seriously injured. Preston interrupts Martin Fowler (James Bye) and his wife Stacey Fowler (Lacey Turner) when they are having sex in his van, saying there has been a complaint about them.
Ross Abernethy	7–12 August (2 episodes)	William Tapley	A police press officer who prepares Ian Beale (Adam Woodyatt) for his upcoming televised appeal for witnesses regarding the murder of his daughter Lucy Beale (Hetti Bywater). He refuses to allow Ian's family and friends to sit in on the appeal, saying that only Ian and his son Peter Beale (Ben Hardy) can sit with the press.
Imogen Phipps	8 August 2014– 11 September 2017 (3 episodes)	Janice Acquah	A midwife who delivers Kat (Jessie Wallace) and Alfie Moon's (Shane Richie) twin babies Bert and Ernie. She appears again, credited only as "Midwife", when she examines a pregnant Shabnam Masood (Rakhee Thakrar) after she stops feeling her baby kick and tells Shabnam that she cannot feel the baby's heartbeat. She is later visited by Abi Branning (Lorna Fitzgerald) who is pregnant with Steven Beale's (Aaron Sidwell)'s baby, shortly after his death.
Beth Kennedy	12 August 2014– 5 October 2015 (3 episodes)	Jordan Baker	A journalist who attends a televised appeal for witnesses regarding the murder of Lucy Beale (Hetti Bywater). She criticises the progress of the investigation and upsets Lucy's father, Ian Beale (Adam Woodyatt), by suggesting that Lucy was an habitual user of drugs. The following year, she calls at the Beales' house and informs Ian that there is a new lead in the murder investigation after a witness had come forward. She later visits the café and tries to question Jane Beale (Laurie Brett) about her affair with Max Branning (Jake Wood), who has been convicted of Lucy's murder and also asks her about the trial verdict, which is overheard by Jane's adoptive son Bobby (Eliot Carrington), upsetting him.
Nurse Christine Lewis	22 August	Janet Walker	A nurse at a care home Ian Beale (Adam Woodyatt) and Denise Fox (Diane Parish) visit for Patrick Trueman (Rudolph Walker) whilst he recovers from his stroke. It is the same care home where Yvonne Cotton (Pauline McLynn) and Charlie Cotton (Declan Bennett) work and Charlie nearly bumps into Ian and Denise as Christine shows them round.
Fiona Payne	26 August 2014– 23 October 2018 (12 episodes)	Sandra James-Young	A social worker who assesses Ian Beale's (Adam Woodyatt) house following Patrick Trueman's (Rudolph Walker) stroke. She returns when Shabnam Masood (Rakhee Thakrar) contacts social services when she wants to make contact with her daughter Jade Green (Amaya Edward). Shabnam meets Fiona behind her husband Kush's (Davood Ghadami) back and Kush tells Fiona about the death of his and Shabnam's son Zaair and she is sympathetic to him. Fiona brings Jade to see Shabnam on supervised access visits. When Shabnam decides to apply for custody of Jade, Fiona visits her at work and arranges a meeting for them to discuss the residency application form. Fiona visits Shabnam and Kush again on the day of their wedding and informs them that a date has been set for the custody court hearing, which delights Shabnam. When Fiona brings Jade for another supervised visit, she tells Shabnam that the judge in the court hearing will need to speak to Jade and take her wishes into consideration. When Shabnam decides to let Jade's father Dean Wicks (Matt Di Angelo) and paternal grandparents Buster Briggs (Karl Howman) and Shirley Carter (Linda Henry) have custody of her, Fiona brings Jade to Dean's flat to help her move in. When Carmel Kazemi (Bonnie Langford) suspects her grandson Arthur Fowler is being deliberately hurt by his mother, Stacey Fowler (Lacey Turner), she reports it to social services, but tries to retract what she said. Fiona and the police visit Stacey and Martin and tell them they received a report about Arthur. Arthur and his half-sister Lily Fowler (Aine Garvey) are placed into Carmel's care until they have investigated. Arthur is looked over by a doctor, who has no concerns and Stacey and Martin can have Arthur and Lily back. Fiona tells Stacey and Martin she will be conducting further home visits. After speaking with Lily, Fiona tells Stacey and Martin that Lily feels pushed out with Arthur and is anxious about the new baby. The following year, Fiona oversees Harley being collected by his mother, Chloe (Lauren Fitzpatrick), from his foster parents Arshad (Madhav Sharma) and Mariam Ahmed (Indira Joshi).
Mark Harrison	1 September	Edward M Corrie	Stacey Branning's (Lacey Turner) solicitor who visits her in prison and prepares her for her appeal against her conviction for killing Archie Mitchell (Larry Lamb).
Tony Gallagher	5 September	John Webber	A friend of Mick Carter's (Danny Dyer) who Alfie Moon (Shane Richie) tries to sell his car to but is unsuccessful.
Colin Chalmers	5 September	Richard Cunningham	A bank manager whom Alfie Moon (Shane Richie) asks for a loan but turns him down, telling him that he believes Alfie would be unable to repay it.
Deborah Lake	18–19 September (2 episodes)	Charlotte Pyke	A consultant at the hospital who treats Kat Moon (Jessie Wallace) for severe burns after she is injured in a fire at her home. She then talks Kat through the likely stages of recovery and treatment for her injuries.
Neil Wallace	18–19 September (2 episodes)	Kevin Pallister	A fire service investigator who questions Alfie Moon (Shane Richie) about a fire at his home. He also questions Mo Harris (Laila Morse) and Stacey Branning (Lacey Turner) about the fire. He rules that the fire was started accidentally and tells Alfie that the insurance will probably pay out for the repairs to the damage.
Dr. Bruce Field	25 September	Matt Lacey	A hospital psychologist who helps Kat Moon (Jessie Wallace) recover from the trauma she suffered from her burns. He tells Kat the extent of her injuries after her bandages are removed.
Marta Shirovs	30 September 2014– 16 April 2015 (8 episodes)	Noeleen Comiskey	Aleks Shirovs' (Kristian Kiehling) wife who comes to Walford with their daughter, Ineta (Gledisa Osmani). Aleks sees them arriving as he leaves for a holiday with Roxy Mitchell (Rita Simons) and her daughter Amy (Abbie Knowles). Marta and Ineta return when Aleks comes back from his holiday. He takes Marta to his office and they have sex, and are nearly interrupted by Roxy, who is looking for Aleks. Aleks arranges for Marta and Ineta to stay at a B&B away from the Square. He later meets them at a café and tells Marta that he still loves her. Marta eventually discovers Aleks and Roxy's relationship when she sees them together in The Queen Victoria public house. Aleks claims that Roxy was a random woman who came on to him and Marta initially believes him but when she calls at Roxy's house with Ineta, where Aleks is living, Roxy answers the door and Marta realises that he has lied to her. Marta slaps Aleks when he returns home and calls Roxy a "prostitute". Marta then decides to leave Ineta with Aleks in London as there are better schools in England and Ineta will have a better life there. Marta then spits in Roxy's face and leaves, returning to Latvia. Marta returns for Ineta's birthday party. She tells Aleks that she misses him and asks him if he feels the same and he does not reply. Two days later, Marta returns after Ineta calls her and tells her that Aleks plans to flee Walford after he is discovered to have been stealing from the Market Traders. Marta tells Roxy to go with Aleks if she loves him but to leave Ineta with her. Roxy reveals that she does not love Aleks and tells him to go back to Marta. Aleks and Marta reunite and leave Walford with Ineta, returning to Latvia.
DC Tony Phipps	7–9 October 2014, 17 March 2016 (3 episodes)	John Lightbody	A police officer investigating Phil Mitchell's (Steve McFadden) shooting. He questions Phil in hospital and he claims not to remember anything about the incident. Phil's wife Sharon (Letitia Dean) gives him a false description of Phil's attacker, claiming that the shooting was committed by a burglar they had disturbed. Phipps returns when Ollie Carter is hospitalised with a head injury. He questions Ollie's sister Nancy Carter (Maddy Hill) and brother Lee Carter (Danny-Boy Hatchard) and Nancy tells him that she pushed Lee during an argument, knocking over Ollie's high chair in the process and causing his injuries.
Aubrey Charles	20–23 October (2 episodes)	Rob Compton	An estate agent who shows Alfie Moon (Shane Richie) and Mo Harris (Laila Morse) around Number 43 Albert Square, when Alfie puts in an offer for the house. Alfie later asks him to give him the keys to the house and for permission to stay in the property with his family, but he refuses and leaves.
Farida Hussein	23 October	Veejay Kaur	A housing official with Walford Council who Alfie Moon (Shane Richie) applies for accommodation for his family with. She arranges for Alfie and his family to stay for one night in a Bed and Breakfast.
Henry Summerhayes	7 November	Will Knightley	The father of DC Emma Summerhayes (Anna Acton). Along with his uptight wife Margot, he has dinner with Emma and her new partner Max Branning (Jake Wood), and is impressed by Max's genuinely caring nature.
Margot Summerhayes	7 November 2014– 27 January 2015 (2 episodes)	Jill Baker	The mother of DC Emma Summerhayes (Anna Acton). Along with her husband Henry, she attends dinner at Emma's partner Max Branning's (Jake Wood) house; she initially dislikes Max and his family but she is impressed by his cooking and how he genuinely seems to care about Emma. Margot later visits Max on the day of Emma's funeral and expresses her upset over his absence. She then comforts him and Max's sister Carol Jackson (Lindsey Coulson) witnesses this and accuses Max of making a pass at Margot.
Judy Mackintosh	7 November	Jo Martin	The mother of Fiona "Tosh" Mackintosh (Rebecca Scroggs). She is invited to dinner by Tosh's girlfriend, Tina Carter (Luisa Bradshaw-White), along with her husband, but she fails to convince him to come, due to his devout Christian nature being against Tosh's sexuality. She is offended when Tosh and Tina reveal they are trying for a baby, and leaves early.
Dr Govinder Purewal	20 November	Sartaj Garewal	A consultant who treats Stan Carter (Timothy West) for his prostate cancer. He informs Stan's daughter Tina (Luisa Bradshaw-White) that Stan has refused further treatment for his illness.
Melissa Phillips	1 December 2014– 12 March 2015 (2 episodes)	Martha Cope	The Minute Mart's regional area manager who visits the shop to do a stock take. She discovers that some items are missing and Denise Fox (Diane Parish) confesses to stealing them. She later returns to inform Shabnam Masood (Rakhee Thakrar) that the Minute Mart will not be closing and that she can keep her job.
Henry Chen	8 December 2014– 6 June 2024 (3 episodes)	Nicholas Goh	A doctor who treats Sonia Fowler (Natalie Cassidy) in hospital after she collapses from an infection caused by having a gastric band inserted. He tells her that she will make a full recovery but she cannot have the gastric band put back in. He is seen again when he assesses Stacey Branning's (Lacey Turner) mental health, and decides that she should be sectioned. Chen next appears when he performs an ultrasound on Sonia, who is pregnant, after she experiences some bleeding. He informs Sonia and her partner, Reiss Colwell (Jonny Freeman), that she was actually not pregnant and has a blighted ovum.
Dr Claire Hart	11 December	Hilary Jones	A doctor at an abortion clinic Linda Carter (Kellie Bright) visits. She gives Linda a consent form to sign after Linda explains to her why she wants to abort her baby.
PC Benjamin Kresge	16 December 2014– 28 December 2017 (5 episodes)	Matthew Ashforde	A police officer who evicts Kat (Jessie Wallace) and Alfie Moon (Shane Richie) from Terry Spraggan's (Terry Alderton) old flat where they had been squatting. He appears again when Ian Beale (Adam Woodyatt) reports Cindy Williams (Mimi Keene) missing. Ian gives Kresge a picture of Cindy, but Kresge tells him that as Cindy had gone voluntarily with two men she had met in a bar, there is little the police can do. Kresge later brings a homeless Cora Cross (Ann Mitchell) to Dot Branning's (June Brown) house after Cora claims to live there. Kresge brings Preston Cooper (Martin Anzor) home after he is found drunk and asks Michelle Fowler (Jenna Russell) if she knows who he is and she confirms that she does. Kresge later appears investigating Lauren (Jacqueline Jossa) and Abi Branning's (Lorna Fitzgerald) fall from the roof of The Queen Victoria public house.
Meena Mukerjee	18 December	Mia Soteriou	A council housing official who Kat (Jessie Wallace) and Alfie Moon (Shane Richie) apply for accommodation with. After telling them that the waiting list for council housing in London is too long, she finds them a property in Hull for them to live.
