= Rebecca Scroggs =

English actress

- Born: 1982 (age 43–44); London, England, UK
- Occupation: Actress
- Years active: 2010–present
- Notable work: EastEnders (2014)

Rebecca Scroggs is an English actress. She has performed numerous roles in the theatre including at the Royal National Theatre, Birmingham Rep and the Sheffield Crucible. She is known for playing Fiona "Tosh" Mackintosh for 63 episodes of BBC’s EastEnders in 2014.

More recent credits include Scarborough (2019), Flack (2019–2020), Alex Rider (2020), and Grace (2021–2023).

== Early life ==
Rebecca Scroggs is an English actress from London, England. Scroggs was a drama student at the University of Sussex during 2002, where she obtained a degree in European Drama and French. As part of her degree she spent a year at the Universite de Provence, Aix en Provence. Furthering her acting education, Scroggs was one of 32 students selected from 2000 applicants (approx.) to train at the Royal Academy of Dramatic Art (RADA) in London, where she graduated with a Bachelor of Arts in Acting Degree (H Level).

== Career ==
=== Theatre ===
Scroggs began her career at London's Tricycle Theatre appearing in Detaining Justice by Bola Agbaje, directed by Indhu Rubasingham. She appeared at the Royal National Theatre in George Buchner's Danton's Death directed by Michael Grandage in 2010 and again in 2016, as Maya in The Suicide, adapted from the Russian play by Maxim Gorky by Suhayla El-Bushra and directed by Nadia Fall. In 2017 she starred in the premier of Chris Bush's Steel at the Sheffield Crucible, a two hander directed by Rebecca Frecknall, doubling the roles of Vanessa Gallacher and Josie Kirkwood.

=== Television and film ===
One of first television programmes Scroggs worked on was the BBC’s Planet of the Apemen: Battle for Earth, where she played the character Byana in both Homo Erectus and Neanderthal episodes. The same year, she appeared as Michelle Bouchant in Death in Paradise episode "Music of Murder" alongside Ben Miller and Danny John-Jules. In 2014, Scroggs landed a regular role on BBC’s long running serial EastEnders, where she played Fiona "Tosh" Mackintosh for 63 episodes that year.

In 2019, Scroggs played Ursula Pittman in Smoke and Mirrors – final chapter of the Acorn TV comedy-drama murder-mystery series Queens of Mystery Later that year, Scroggs landed a regular role as WPC Treeves in the BBC comedy series Scarborough. In 2019 she appeared in 3 episodes of season one of Amazon's Alex Rider series. In 2018 and 2019 she had a recurring role in Flack, produced by and starring Anna Paquin.

In 2021, Scroggs secured a regular role playing Detective Chief Inspector Tina Carter in the Channel 4 crime drama Before we Die, alongside Lesley Sharp.

== Other interests ==
Scroggs was involved with the Forge Collective, supporting feminism and equality. Scroggs is also a keen athlete, running the Brighton Half Marathon in 2012.

== Filmography ==
=== Film ===
Year	Title	Role	Notes
2010	15 Seconds	Rachel	Short
2013	Dead Cat	Woman	Film
2015	Hard to Lose	Laura	Short
2021	Nation Your Nation	Adjudicator	Short
2022	Awakened Dreams	Pale	film

=== Television ===
Year	Title	Role	Notes
2011	Planet of the Apemen: Battle for Earth	Byana	2 episodes "Homo Erectus" and "Neanderthal"
2011, 2014, 2015	Doctors	Sophie Myerson (2011); Ally Lenton (2014); SGT Nadia Devlin (2015)	3 episodes
2011	Death in Paradise	Michelle Bouchant	Episode – "Music of Murder"
2014	EastEnders	Fiona "Tosh" Mackintosh	Series regular – 63 episodes
2015	Holby City	Tori Clifton	Episode 38 – "Losing Control of the Wheel"
2018	Casualty	Frankie Arnolds	Season 33, episode 12
2019–2020	Flack	Abigail Reese	Supporting role – 4 episodes
2019	Queens of Mystery	Ursula Pittman	"Smoke and Mirrors – final episode"
2019	Scarborough	WPC Treeves	Main role – 4 episodes
2020	Alex Rider	Snake	Recurring role – 3 episodes
2021	Before We Die	Tina Carter	Main - 6 episodes
2022	Professor T.	Anya Hallett	1 episode
2021–2023	Grace	Ari Branson	3 episodes

=== Video games ===
Year	Title	Role	Notes
2015	Soma	Julia Dahl	Voice
2020	Serious Sam 4	Michelle / Princess	Voices
