= Rogue (2020 film) =

American action film

- Official release poster
- Directed by: M. J. Bassett
- Written by: M. J. Bassett; Isabel Bassett
- Produced by: Kyle Ambrose; Delon Bakker; M. J. Bassett; Molly Hassell
- Starring: Megan Fox; Philip Winchester
- Cinematography: Brendan Barnes
- Edited by: Andrew MacRitchie; David Wigram
- Music by: Jack Halama; Scott Shields
- Production companies: Grindstone Entertainment Group; Mannequin Pictures; M-Net; Capstone Pictures
- Distributed by: Lionsgate
- Release date: August 28, 2020
- Running time: 105 minutes
- Country: United States
- Language: English
- Box office: $242,884

Rogue is a 2020 American action thriller film directed by M. J. Bassett, who wrote the screenplay with her daughter Isabella, and starring Megan Fox and Philip Winchester. It tells the story of a mercenary on a rescue mission whose team gets trapped in Africa and must fight to survive against both the local insurgents and a bloodthirsty lioness. The film was released on August 28, 2020.

== Plot ==
Within the grasslands of East Africa, a mercenary named Samantha "Sam" O'Hara is leading an operation with a team of multinational mercenaries which includes the loyal Elijah, the outgoing Joey and Bo, the confrontational Mike Barasa, and the Masaai and former jihadist Pata. They are dispatched on a rescue mission to retrieve Asilia Wilson, the teenage daughter of a governor who was abducted for ransom purposes alongside her two schoolmates Chloe and Tessa by Zalaam, the leader of a terrorist cell affiliated with al-Shabaab.

Going against the original plan, Sam decides to free the other two girls as well. Nonetheless, the mission is successful. Although the extraction helicopter gets shot down by an RPG. While pursued across the plains by Zalaam's militia, a violent gunfight ensues atop the cliffs in which several mercenaries are killed, forcing the survivors to escape by leaping into the river below, losing most of their equipment and their satphone. After regrouping on the shoreline, Chloe is killed by a crocodile and Sam urges the group to press on in order to reach a way to call their employers to arrange a new extraction.

While traveling, the team comes across an abandoned game farm that belonged to poachers who specialized in trafficking wild animals for the exotic pet trade and their body parts for traditional medicine. At nightfall, the group find themselves stalked through the ranch by a lone lioness who had slaughtered the previous occupants after escaping from her cage. Elijah is the first to be killed while Bo is seriously injured. Sam and Joey manage to find and power the farm's generator and call for the extraction, but Barasa is also mauled to death by the lioness while helping them avoid her. The group is told to wait until dawn for a new helicopter. Pata warns them that Zalaam is not going to let Asilia escape that easily because of the power that she represents over her father. Pata also admits his jihadist past, much to Tessa's shock, and recounts how the terrorists murdered his family and children in retaliation after he left the militant group.

Joey is attacked by the lioness, but the arrival of the terrorists scares her away. During the ensuing battle, Sam and Pata manage to kill most of the fighters. Asilia finds the courage to fight back and kills one of them, while Pata confronts Zalaam's second-in-command Masakh, the man who executed his family. With Sam's help, he manages to get his vengeance. Pata is too wounded to keep going and is finished off by the terrorists. Both too injured to fight, Joey and Bo witness the lioness coming back and assaulting Zalaam's men. Bo then succumbs to his injuries with Joey by his side.

Zalaam captures Tessa, but Sam convinces him to trade her life for Asilia, luring him into the barn where the lioness is waiting. Meanwhile, Joey finds a couple of lion cubs in another building. The lioness mauls Zalaam to death and then turns to face Sam. She spares Sam after hearing the cubs meowing outside. As the dawn breaks, Sam, Joey and the two girls walk towards the helicopter that's coming to extract them as the lions leave.

A postscript states that this film is fictional and addresses the illegal lion farms operating in South Africa which must be stopped.

== Cast ==
- Megan Fox as Samantha "Sam" O'Hara
- Philip Winchester as Joey Kasinski
- Greg Kriek as Mike Barasa
- Brandon Auret as Elijah Dekker
- Jessica Sutton as Asilia Wilson
- Kenneth Fok as Bo Yinn
- Isabelle Bassett as Tessa
- Adam Deacon as Zalaam
- Sisanda Henna as Pata
- Tamer Burjaq as Masakh
- Ashish Gangapersad as Nuru
- Calli Taylor as Chloe
- Lee-Anne Liebenberg as T.J.

== Production ==
M. J. Bassett originally co-wrote the screenplay with her daughter, with the intention of it being a small pet project. After the producers read the script, they thought it was more of a star vehicle, and sent the script to Fox's agent, who accepted the next day.

With physical production being helmed by South African Production Company, Mannequin Pictures, filming took place in December 2019 on a game farm about 40 miles from Johannesburg, South Africa.

== Release ==
Rogue was released in the United States digitally August 28, 2020, and then on Blu-ray and DVD September 1.

Through its first two weeks of release in the U.S., the film had totaled $1,789,726 in DVD and Blu-ray sales.

== Reception ==
On the review aggregator website Rotten Tomatoes, the film holds an approval rating of 64% based on 11 reviews, with an average rating of 5.2/10.
