= Lee-Anne Liebenberg =

South African actress and stuntwoman

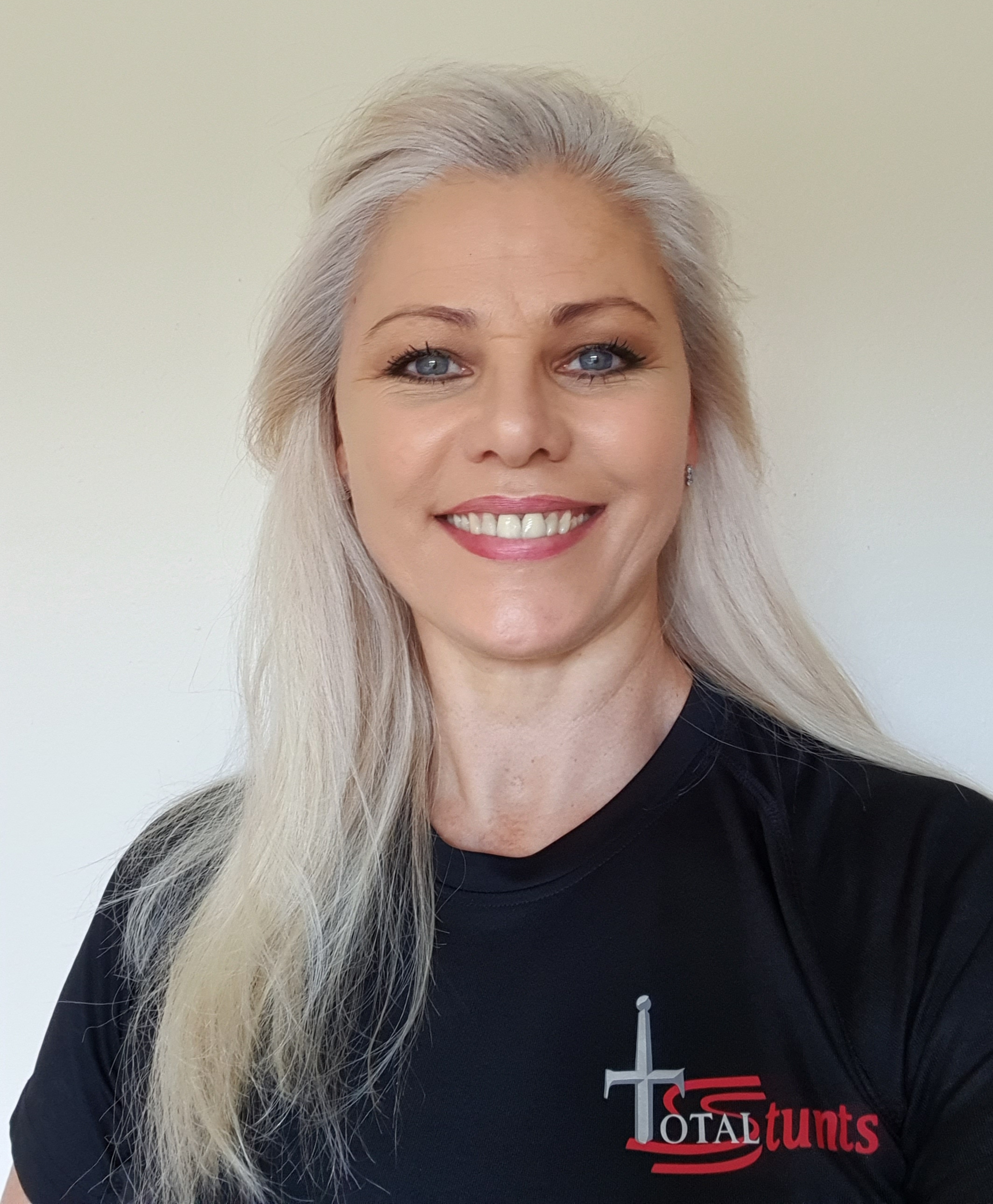
- Occupation: stuntwoman . actress
- Known for: Doomsday

Lee-Anne Liebenberg is a South African stuntwoman, actress, stunt coordinator and precision driver. She is best known for her work on Doomsday (2008), Chappie (2015) and District 9 (2009).

In 1995, she represented South Africa in International Gladiators 2.

== Filmography ==
=== As Stuntwoman ===
==== Film ====
- Bloodshot, stunt performer (2020)
- Revolt, stunt double of Bérénice Marlohe (2017)
- I Am Not a Witch, stunt coordinator (2017)
- Resident Evil: The Final Chapter (2016)
- Skorokoro, stunt coordinator (2016)
- Mignon Mossie van Wyk, stunt coordinator (2016)
- Avengers: Age of Ultron (2015)
- Chappie (2015)
- Stuur groete aan Mannetjies Roux (2013)
- Safari (2013)
- Layla Fourie, assistant rigger/precision driver (2013)
- Vehicle 19 (2013)
- Death Race 2 (2010)
- District 9 (2009)
- Ouma se Slim Kind, fight choreographer (2007)
- Prey, stunt coordinator/stunt double (2007)
- Primeval (2007)
- The Breed (2006)
- Consequence (2003)
- Sumuru (2003)
- Panic (2002)
- Askari (2001)
- Cold Harvest (1999)
- Sweepers (1998)
- Orion's Key (1996)
- Danger Zone (1996)
- Warhead (1996)
- Live Wire 2: Human Timebomb (1995)
- Lunarcop (1995)
- Never Say Die (1994)
- Cyborg Cop II (1994)
- Fleshtone (1994)
- Project Shadowchaser II (1994)
- Yankee Zulu (1993)

==== TV ====
- Vlug na Egipte, stunt coordinator (2015)
- Silent Witness (2008)
- Uncle Max (2006)
- Supernova (2005)
- Slipstream (2005)
- Home Alone 4 (2002)
- Operation Delta Force, assistant stunt coordinator (1997)

=== As actress ===
==== Film ====
- Rogue, TJ (2020)
- Impunity (2014)
- Death Race 2 (2010)
- Doomsday, Viper (2008)
- Straight Outta Benoni (2005)
- Wake of Death (2004)
- Merlin: The Return (2000)
- Cold Harvest (1999)
- Warhead (1996)
- Fleshtone (1994)

==== TV ====
- Blood Drive, Abby the Nun (2017)
- Planet of the Apemen: Battle for Earth (2011)
- Charlie Jade (2005)
- Shark Attack (1999)
- Tarzan: The Epic Adventures (1997)
