= Family liaison officer =

Police position in the United Kingdom

A family liaison officer (FLO; often pronounced as a word) in the United Kingdom is a police officer, either uniformed or Criminal Investigation Department (CID), trained to provide liaison between the police and families who have been victims of crime. Every territorial police force has a pool of trained FLOs. The FLO is assigned to the family by the senior investigating officer (SIO). FLOs are usually assigned in any situation where a point of contact between the family and the police is deemed essential, such as a murder investigation or a case of a missing child. Since 1999, British police forces have also assigned FLOs to assist families who have lost relatives in terrorist attacks or major disasters.

The FLO is key to gathering data that will assist in the identification and/or repatriation of relatives. They also keep the family updated on the progress of the investigation. FLOs need excellent communication skills, as they are often the person who reports investigative advances in the case. Sometimes, the FLO will give a statement to the media if the family do not wish to.

The key drivers for police family liaison in the United Kingdom have come from the public inquiries into the death of Stephen Lawrence (report published in February 1999) and the Marchioness disaster on the River Thames (report published in 2001).

== Non-police FLOs ==
Some private, fee-paying schools have FLOs, although the position differs from the one in the police. The British Armed Forces also have Royal Military Police-trained FLOs for families of deceased personnel. In the United States Family Liaison Officers are utilized by the National Park Service to support ongoing rescues, recoveries and investigations.

== Training ==
Students applying to be a trained FLO will continue day-to-day police work in their parent department and will only be brought in as a FLO and taken off normal duties when the need arises. Students initially undertake a five-day training module. Course content includes talks from surviving victims or their families, team building exercises, and studying of computer presentations. Upon completion of the first module, FLOs train further in three subjects, which may include major crime and road death. The course is made up of a total of seven days' training, divided into two modules held on consecutive weeks.
