= Planet of the Apemen: Battle for Earth =

Television series

- Genre: Nature documentary
- Written by: Colin Swash
- Directed by: Tony Mitchell; Dave Stewart
- Narrated by: Geraldine James
- Composers: Andrew Simon McAllister; Mark Gordon
- Country of origin: United Kingdom
- Original language: English
- No. of episodes: 1

Production
- Executive producers: Michael Mosley; Ailsa Orr
- Producers: Isabelle Helle; Stephen McDonogh; Fiona Scott
- Production locations: UK, Germany, South Africa
- Running time: 120 minutes
- Production companies: Moonlighting Atlantis Productions; Erste Weltweit Medien

Original release
- Network: BBC
- Release: 23 June – 30 June 2011

Planet of the Apemen: Battle for Earth is a dramatised documentary on the struggles of Homo sapiens with Homo erectus in the first episode, and Homo neanderthalensis in the second episode, broadcast on BBC One on 23 and 30 June 2011 respectively.

== Plot ==
Planet of the Apemen: Battle for Earth is a dramatised documentary on how Homo sapiens once shared the world with other species of hominid. The first episode concentrates on Homo erectus, set in India around 75,000 years ago, life after a catastrophic super-volcanic eruption made food animals scarce and Homo erectus encounters a different species of human.

The second episode focuses on the plight of the Homo neanderthalensis. The scene is set in Prehistoric London some 35,000 years ago, where migrating Homo sapiens looking for food animals, chance upon a community of Neanderthals. This series was first broadcast on BBC One on 23 and 30 June 2011 respectively.

== Cast ==
Narrator for both episodes - Geraldine James

=== Episode 1 Homo erectus ===
Homo sapiens

- Jothan Annan as Gamba
- Roger Nsengiyumva as Baako
- Ranya Campbell as Malika
- Angela Wynter as Wangari

Homo erectus

- Clayton Evertson as Mika
- Sang Lui as Heku
- Nathan Fredricks as Kiko
- Ryan Knoll as Dokka

=== Episode 2 Neanderthal ===
Homo neanderthalensis

- Justin Strydom as Gora
- Ethan Strydom as Gora's son
- Matt Rook as Tetah
- Lee-Anne Liebenberg as Tetah's Mate
- Troy Milenov as the Neanderthal Man -
- Rika Haasbroek as the Neanderthal Woman
- Johnny Everitt as the Old Neanderthal

Homo sapiens

- Rebecca Scroggs as Byana
- Ray Fearon as Kalay
- Gary Carr as Jala
- Jimmy Akingbola as Morda
- Ngobile Sipama as Sapiens Woman

Guest actors

- Sean Francis as Geron
- Damian Tomaselli as Radda
