= Claudette Hubbard =

Fictional character from EastEnders

- EastEnders character
- Portrayed by: Ellen Thomas
- Duration: 2015–2016
- First appearance: Episode 5031/5032; 12 March 2015
- Last appearance: Episode 5378; 1 November 2016
- Introduced by: Dominic Treadwell-Collins
In-universe information
- Occupation: Nurse
- Husband: Henry Hubbard (backstory)
- Sons: Vincent Hubbard
- Adoptive sons: Linford Short (foster); Glen (foster)
- Adoptive daughters: Donna Yates (foster)
- Grandsons: Mica Fox
- Granddaughters: Pearl Fox

Claudette Hubbard is a fictional character from the BBC soap opera EastEnders, played by Ellen Thomas. She made her first appearance on 12 March 2015. Claudette is introduced as a friend of Les (Roger Sloman) and Pam Coker (Lin Blakley), before being established as the mother of Vincent Hubbard (Richard Blackwood), as well as the foster mother of Donna Yates (Lisa Hammond) and several other children. Upon her introduction, the character was described as a "new steely matriarch".

During her time on the show, Claudette's storylines included being accused of an affair with Les, before it was ultimately revealed she was aiding his cross-dressing, her volatile history with the Mitchell family, a feud with Babe Smith (Annette Badland), and being left for dead and buried alive by her son Vincent after revealing she was responsible for the death of her husband. Thomas received two award nominations for her portrayal of Claudette; the British Soap Award for Villain of the Year and Best Bad Girl at the Inside Soap Awards. In September 2016, it was confirmed that Thomas would depart her role as Claudette and would leave the soap after being axed by the newly-appointed executive producer Sean O'Connor. Digital Spy wrote that they would miss "her boobs, blackmail and barmy antics" and Thomas herself stated that she would expect Claudette to return in the future.

== Casting and characterisation ==
It's so long ago I can't remember the name of the first character I was. Then I was Grace and now I'm Claudette. Third time lucky. Give me a wig, give me a new pair of shoes and it's a new character!

— Ellen Thomas discussing her experience of playing various characters in EastEnders

Thomas' casting was announced on 1 March 2015. The role of Claudette marks Thomas' fourth time on EastEnders, she previously appeared as Pearl Chadwick in 1990, Estella Hulton in 2002 and Grace Olubunmi between 2010 and 2011. Speaking of Thomas and her character, executive producer Dominic Treadwell-Collins stated: "Ellen Thomas belongs on EastEnders. Albert Square now has a new steely matriarch – with a few twisted secrets hidden behind her beaming smile." David Brown from the Radio Times added that Claudette had links to established regular characters and would be "a tough-talking resident of Albert Square".

Thomas revealed that Claudette's family would be introduced to the soap and was introduced as the mother of established character Vincent Hubbard (Richard Blackwood).. She explained: "Claudette is a foster mother, she's fostered children for the last 30 years. She's fostered the kind of children nobody else wants – tough cookies." She found it to be a "brilliant opportunity to bring new characters in".

== Development ==
=== Friendship with Les and Pam Coker ===
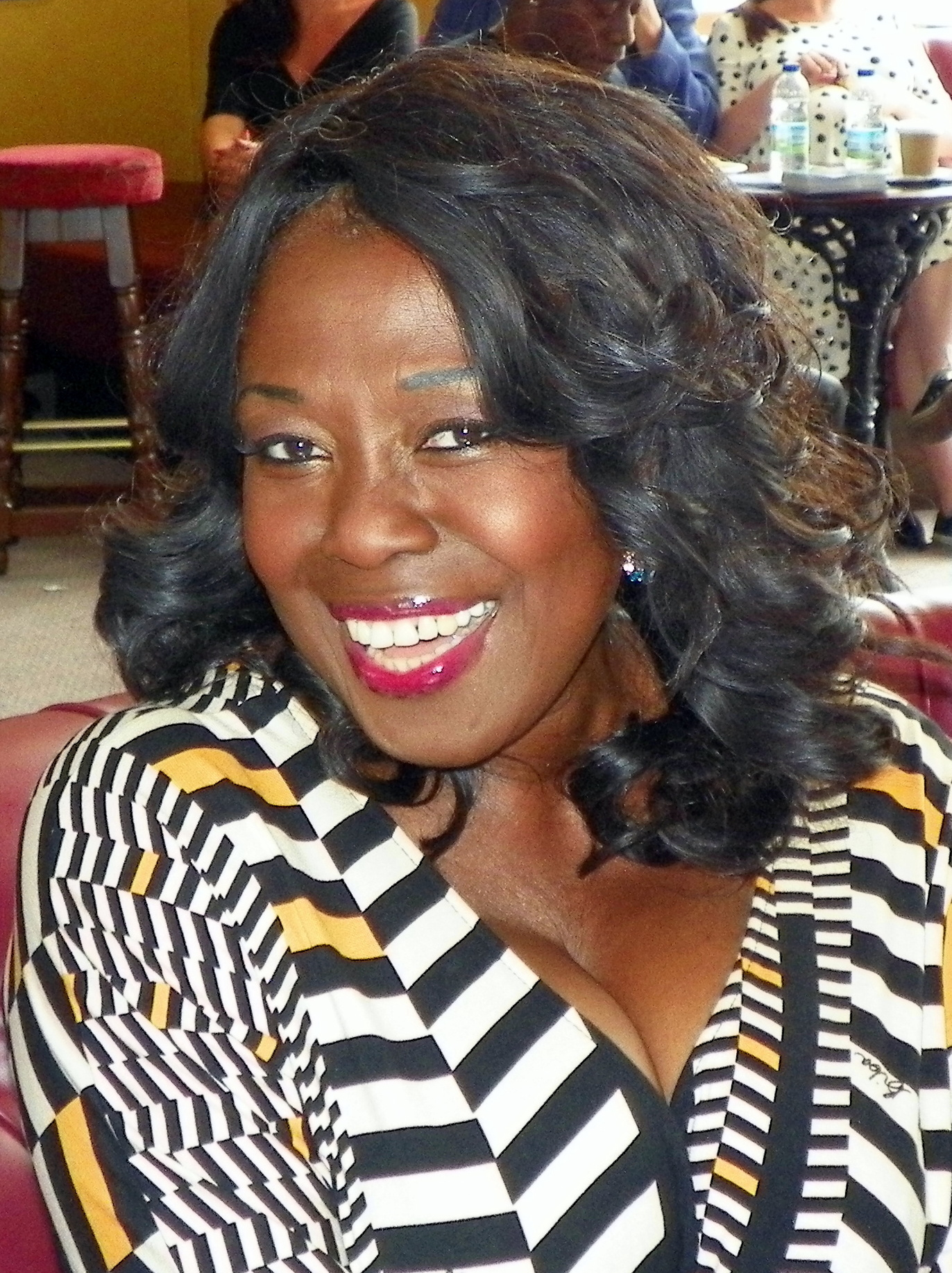
Claudette (Ellen Thomas, pictured) is introduced as a friend of the Coker family.

Claudette's identity was kept a secret from viewers upon her arrival. She is shown to be having what looks like an affair with Les Coker (Roger Sloman) when he visits her at a café and gives her a necklace. Later that night, while he and his wife, Pam Coker (Lin Blakley), are celebrating their wedding anniversary, Les gets a text from Claudette, thanking him for her necklace. Claudette and Les meet again a week later at the park, with Claudette later arriving for her foster daughter Donna Yates' (Lisa Hammond) birthday celebrations as arranged by Pam. It is revealed that she knows Les and Pam from when the latter worked as a social worker and placed Donna in Claudette's care. When Les' grandson, Paul Coker (Jonny Labey), arrives in Walford, he reveals that he knows Les and Claudette are having an affair. Les decides to stop meeting Claudette but she is not willing to conclude it and states that she will make it difficult for him to exit.

Thinking Claudette and Les are having an affair, Pam leaves. Claudette urges him to tell Pam the truth, just as Pam returns and walks in on them together. Shortly after Claudette leaves the house, Pam urges Les to end the affair or their marriage is over. Two days later, he calls Claudette, telling her he cannot stop thinking about her, and later makes an excuse to Pam to go and be with Claudette again. He is then caught at Claudette's house in his underwear by Donna, who concludes they are having an affair, though Claudette tries to explain it is not what she thinks. Donna tells Pam, who goes to Claudette's house and sets about destroying gifts from Les until Claudette says the presents are not hers, and Pam should ask Les about Christine. When Pam asks Les, he reveals that Christine is his secret feminine alter ego, and he likes wearing women's clothes, and that Claudette has been supporting this secret. Claudette later tells Pam that Les persuaded her not to reveal his secret and encourages Pam to speak to Les about it.

Claudette helps Pam and Les prepare for their "meeting" with Christine, and tells Pam that "seeing" Christine for the first time will be easier than she thinks. Thomas was "moved to tears" by the storyline when it aired. She explained: "When I watched Christine's first appearance, I got a bit teary. Even though I had been there and filmed it, when watching I just thought about the people going through the same thing in real life." She told Inside Soap that she hoped the storyline would affect the viewers in a similar way.

=== Relationships with the Mitchells and Patrick Trueman ===
Claudette, who knows the Mitchells, finds Vincent has been beaten by Phil Mitchell (Steve McFadden) and vows revenge on Phil. She starts working in the Albert and meets Phil's aunt, Sal (Anna Karen), who is visiting the Mitchells. It was hinted that Sal's return "could spark big trouble" for Claudette. Speaking to Inside Soap, Thomas said: "I can't wait for you to find out what little old Claudette has been up to. She thinks the past is long dead and buried - but unfortunately for her, some people return to dig it all up again." Sal reveals that Claudette used to work at a bar nearby and has known the Mitchell family for decades. She threatens to reveal secrets about Claudette, so she asks Vincent to speed up with his established plan to take down the Mitchells. Hinting towards the culmination of the storyline, Thomas said: "Christmas is magic. We've been filming some scenes recently that are off the hook. All I'll say is fasten your seat belts, because it's going to be a very bumpy ride."

It is revealed that Claudette's husband, Henry, was an associate of Den Watts (Leslie Grantham), Ted Hills (Brian Croucher), Gavin Sullivan (Paul Nicholas) and Eric Mitchell (George Russo), Phil's father. Vincent was told by Claudette that Henry was killed by Eric 34 years previously on Christmas Eve after a confrontation when Vincent was a child. A drunken Phil kidnaps Pearl which leads to an altercation between Vincent and Phil. Vincent says that Eric killed his father but Phil says Henry just left Walford. The feud between the Mitchells and Hubbards leads to the death of innocent Fatboy (Ricky Norwood), so Vincent tells Claudette that their feud killed him and they should end it, but this infuriates Claudette who then compares him to his father and accidentally reveals that Henry did not die when she said he did. When Ronnie's mother Glenda Mitchell (Glynis Barber) makes a brief visit, she recognises Claudette and Vincent, and later tells Ronnie that Eric did not kill Henry because he was drunk that night and did not leave the house. Ronnie then blackmails Claudette with the information, so Claudette tells Vincent to end the feud as it cannot bring back Henry or Fatboy. Claudette and Patrick flirt with each other and eventually begin dating; however it is hampered by Denise Fox's (Diane Parish) disapproval.

=== Husband's murder and being buried alive ===
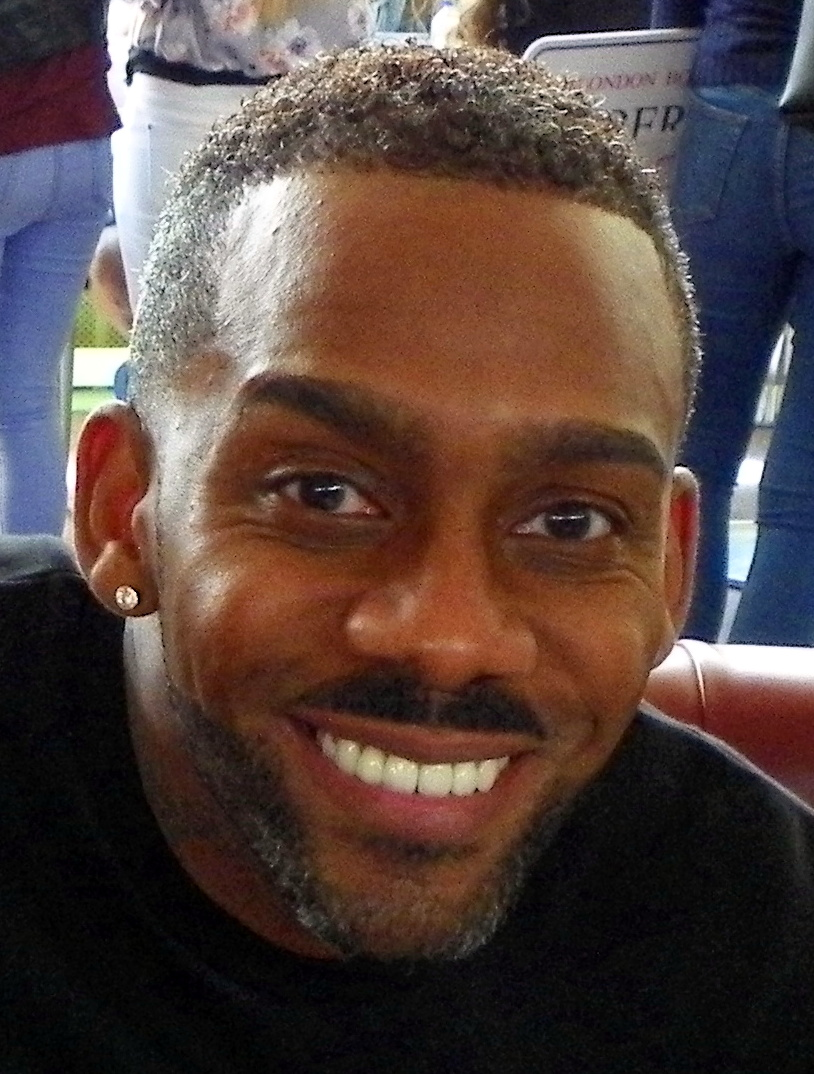
Claudette is buried alive after being presumed dead by her son Vincent Hubbard, played by Richard Blackwood (pictured)

Claudette and Kim Fox-Hubbard (Tameka Empson) have rivalry at Pearl's (Arayah Harris-Buckle) first birthday party, and when Claudette's foster son Linford Short (Leon Lopez) announces that he and Vincent have entered Claudette into the Pride of Walford Awards and she is a finalist, a jealous Kim jumps on Pearl's bouncy castle in an attempt to take attention from Claudette, which Claudette punctures in retaliation. Later that day, Gavin meets Claudette and blackmails her, saying he wants money to stop him revealing a secret from her past. She fails to get money from Les or Vincent, so she meets Gavin at her home and tries to pay him off with sex. However, he says that it is worthless as she used to be promiscuous, and asks how she killed Henry, so Claudette strikes him over the head with a candelabra. It was then confirmed that there was "big shocks in store" for the Hubbards. Vincent arrives, and she lies about the circumstances, but when Gavin escapes, her lies are revealed and Vincent works out he was blackmailing her and she killed Henry. When she insults Henry, Vincent chokes Claudette, as Patrick arrives and stops him.

Vincent reveals to Patrick that Claudette killed Henry, and as Patrick tries to call the police, Claudette tries to snatch the phone off him, but falls down the basement stairs, hitting her head on a brick. Patrick leaves to get help but when he returns, Vincent has buried Claudette underneath the basement and tells Patrick to forget it happened or they will both be arrested for murder. However, unknown to Vincent and Patrick, Claudette escapes from the basement in a "shock twist" and is brought into the hospital by paramedics after she was found by the side of a road. Before viewers could protest to the story's realism, Thomas tweeted to defend the twist. She insisted that Claudette's survival is plausible and posted a newspaper clipping about a woman who dug herself out of her own grave.

Patrick later sees Claudette. Realising that she is alive, he tells Vincent, who soon realises the truth. When Vincent goes to Donna's home, Donna reveals Claudette is with her and has told her what Vincent did to her. Donna refuses to believe that Claudette killed Henry, so Vincent reveals that Claudette killed Fatboy. Donna is distraught at being lied to and asks Vincent and Claudette to leave, but Patrick arrives and confirms that Claudette killed Henry. Claudette insists Henry's death was an accident and threatens to show the police her neck bruises if Patrick calls the police on her, but Donna sees past this, saying that Claudette's fostering her was just an attempt to lessen Claudette's guilt. Vincent tells Claudette to leave Walford for good or he will tell Gavin where she is. Claudette visits Pearl privately and says goodbye to her, promising that she will come back soon. However, Blackwood commented: "I doubt very highly that Claudette will rest easy and let this slide! We all know she is a woman of low remorse. We already saw that she said that she thought his dad was dirt under her feet."

=== Feud with Babe Smith and departure ===
On 13 September 2016, it was announced that Claudette had been axed. At the time, Sean O'Connor had been newly-appointed as EastEnders' executive producer, and as part of his changes, he axed a number of characters alongside Claudette. Speaking on her exit, an EastEnders spokesperson said: "As our regular viewers will know, Claudette has often been seen coming and going from the [Albert Square] to visit her family and friends" concluding that "this is the end of another stint for Claudette and we wish [Thomas] all the best for the future." She made her final appearance on 1 November 2016.

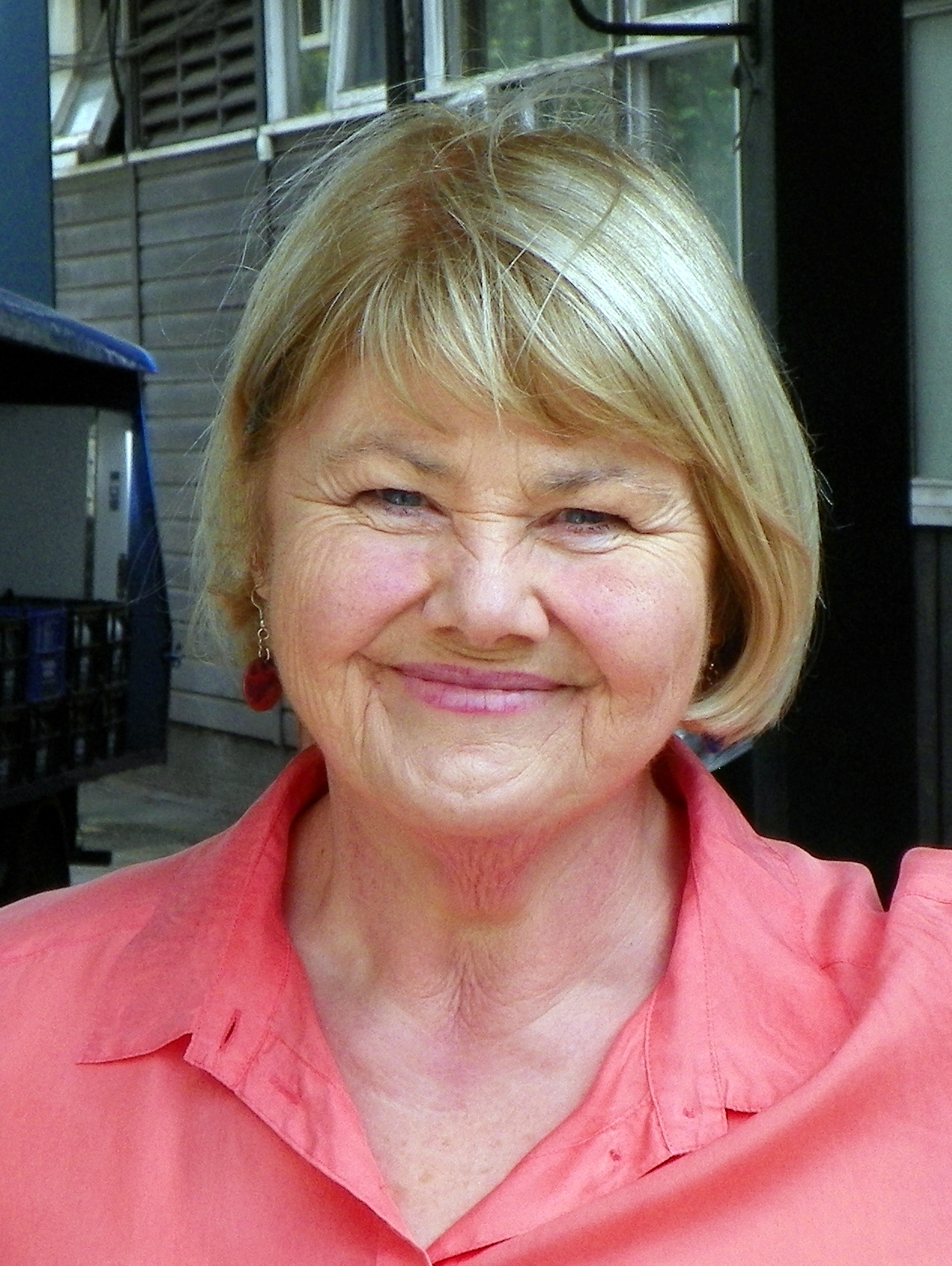
Claudette's final major storylines sees her feud with Babe Smith (Annette Badland, pictured).

At the Pride of Walford Awards, Donna accepts an award on Claudette's behalf, saying how she was not alone when Claudette took her in but now she is alone again. However, Thomas tweeted that viewers should be patient, adding that "revenge is a dish best served cold", hinting that Claudette's return would be imminent. Claudette is shown to be secretly watching Donna's speech, but decides not to come in. Claudette tries to visit Donna in Bridge Street Market but notices former enemy Peggy Mitchell (Barbara Windsor) who scowls at her, so Claudette walks away. Claudette later learns that Babe Smith (Annette Badland) has been blackmailing them over Les' cross-dressing, to which Digital Spy commented that "the gloves are off". It was confirmed that producers had lined up a "sinister feud" with Babe prior to Claudette's exit. However, it was made clear from the beginning that Claudette may be "fighting a losing battle" and that Babe would "come out on top".

Claudette threatens Babe and their argument is witnessed by Babe's relative Linda Carter (Kellie Bright). When Babe is locked in the Queen Victoria public house's freezer store, Linda accuses Claudette, as well as Vincent, Donna and Patrick being suspicious. This leads Claudette to become the "prime suspect" for the crime. Claudette exposes Babe's blackmail to Linda and her husband Mick Carter (Danny Dyer) and it transpires that the real culprit is Abi Branning (Lorna Fitzgerald). She later briefly reconciles with Patrick but her jealousy over his closeness with Dot Branning (June Brown) causes him to publicly break up with her. Humiliated and enraged, she asks Vincent to "take care" of Patrick for hurting her, but Vincent and Donna make her see the error of her ways and encourage her to stay with her foster son, Linford, to clear her head.

On her way out of Walford, she meets Patrick and tells him he was never good enough for her but Patrick says that Claudette does not think she is good enough for anyone. Thomas' final scenes as Claudette aired on 1 November 2016. Thomas said that she expected the character to return in the future, echoing producers' claims that [the door had been left open". Thomas added that [Claudette] would be coming back and if [the producers'] weren't interested [in her returning], they'd have killed the character off. When asked when she thought Claudette would return to the soap, Thomas said she expected the character to return in "six months, nine months – something like that."

== Reception ==
In 2016, Thomas was nominated for the British Soap Award for Villain of the Year for her role as Claudette. That same year, she was also nominated for Best Bad Girl at the Inside Soap Awards.

Laura-Jane Tyler from Inside Soap admitted to being a little scared by "steely" Claudette and said she made Vincent "look like a pussycat." Tyler also hoped that Claudette would turn out to be a big crime boss. Following Claudette's departure, Tyler felt that the character had wasted potential, writing that Claudette should have become an "iconic matriach", similar to Pat Butcher (Pam St Clement) and Peggy, and that more of her foster children should have been introduced, and opined that the soap made her way "too nuts". Richard Blackwood, who played Claudette's on-screen son Vincent, described the character as a "bit of a gangster" and teased that viewers would see her "darker side". Following her attack on Gavin, she was described as "fearsome" by Digital Spy. Following the news of her departure, Sophie Dainty of Digital Spy said that the character would be missed, noting that EastEnders would miss Claudette for "her boobs, blackmail and barmy antics". They also wrote that they would miss her feuds with Babe and Kim, her friendship with Les, her family establishments and the ability to bring new characters into the series.
