= Donna Yates (EastEnders) =

Fictional character from EastEnders

- EastEnders character
- Portrayed by: Lisa Hammond
- Duration: 2014–18
- First appearance: Episode 4837; 14 April 2014
- Last appearance: Episode 5745; 20 July 2018
- Introduced by: Dominic Treadwell-Collins
In-universe information
- Occupation: Market trader
- Adoptive mother: Claudette Hubbard (foster)
- Half-brothers: Vincent Hubbard (foster); Glen (foster); Linford Short (foster)
- Nieces and nephews: Pearl Fox-Hubbard (foster); Mica Fox (foster)

Donna Yates is a fictional character from the BBC soap opera EastEnders, played by Lisa Hammond. The character and casting was announced in March 2014 and she made her first appearance on 14 April of that year. Donna was introduced as a stallholder and a rival to her new colleagues Bianca Jackson (Patsy Palmer) and Kat Slater (Jessie Wallace). EastEnders executive producer Dominic Treadwell-Collins was happy that Hammond had been cast in the role as EastEnders had been trying to get her into the soap for a while. Donna was the second regular disabled character to appear in EastEnders and some of her storylines raised awareness of disabilities. The character was not intended to be in a wheelchair but this changed after Hammond impressed producers. Donna was characterised as being feisty, hardworking, opinionated and brash, and Treadwell-Collins teased that she would not be an easy character to like at first. However, Donna's loyal, fragile and funny sides to her personality were also explored.

Donna's initial storylines involved her clashes and friendships with her colleagues. Her foster mother Claudette Hubbard (Ellen Thomas) and her foster brother Vincent Hubbard (Richard Blackwood) were later introduced, and Donna was seen often clashing with Vincent's wife Kim Fox (Tameka Empson). Donna also formed friendships with several characters, including Nancy Carter (Maddy Hill) and Abi Branning (Lorna Fitzgerald), and she had short-term romantic encounters with Fatboy Chubb (Ricky Norwood) and Shrimpy (Ben Champniss). In 2016, a controversial storyline aired where Donna attempts to get pregnant with Vincent's sperm, though she is unsuccessful. In 2017, Donna develops a rivalry with Robbie Jackson (Dean Gaffney), but the pair later becomes friends and start a romantic relationship, even moving in together.

In April 2018, it was announced that Hammond had left the soap and she made her final appearance on 20 July of that year. Donna's final storyline involved a feud with Rainie Cross (Tanya Franks) and trying to plant drugs on her to prove that she is an unfit parent, which leads to Donna leaving Walford and ending her relationship with Robbie. Donna received positive reception from critics and viewers and Hammond was longlisted for two Inside Soap awards. Several critics called the character feisty and her romance with Robbie was well-received. However, Donna's departure was criticised for being lowkey. Hammond revealed that she had received abuse from viewers for using a wheelchair after they had seen her walk in scenes. On the day of the airing of Donna's departure, Sophie Dainty from Digital Spy wrote an article detailing reasons why she would miss the character.

== Casting and characterisation ==
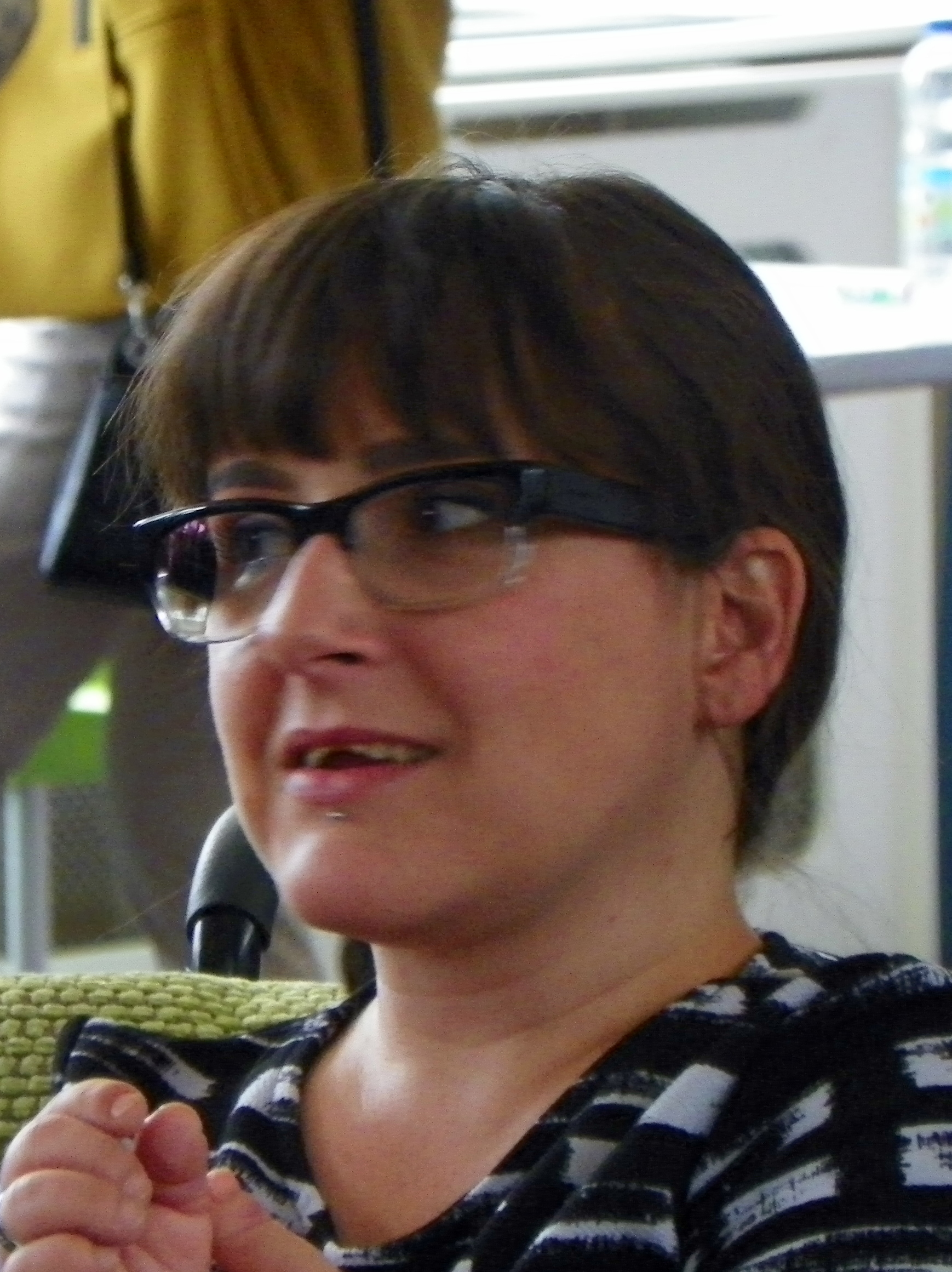
Lisa Hammond impressed producers during her audition for the role.

In March 2014, it was announced that Lisa Hammond had joined the cast of EastEnders as Donna Yates, who was described as a "tough" and "no-nonsense" market trader who would declare "war" and make enemies with her stall rivals Bianca Jackson (Patsy Palmer) and Kat Slater (Jessie Wallace). Hammond was excited to join the soap opera, saying, "It's a great opportunity to be a part of such a big and popular show. Donna is a bit of a handful but they're always the most fun characters to play! It feels good to be bad!" Executive producer Dominic Treadwell-Collins called Donna a "flinty, aggressive and difficult" character and admitted that she would not initially be an easy character to like, but that she would discover her to be a "funny, loyal but also fragile woman underneath" as viewers get to know her better. Treadwell-Collins called Hammond a "brilliantly comic and sharp actress" and was delighted that she had been cast as Donna as he and other EastEnders staff had been trying to get Hammond into the EastEnders cast "for a long time".

"Donna is an in-your-face loud mouth – your best friend or your worst enemy. Donna Yates is a brash woman – Queen of Spring Lane market. She's worked hard all her life and never taken a hand-out from anyone. Proud to a fault, Donna has fought tooth and nail for her independence and won't let anyone take it away from her. Her self-started business is her livelihood and success is everything. She wants to win. She wants respect. She'd rather be feared than loved."

— An excerpt from Donna's official BBC profile.

Donna was reported to be the second regular disabled character to feature in EastEnders after Adam Best (David Proud) from 2009 to 2010. Donna was also the first female actress in a wheelchair to feature in the soap opera. The character was not intended to be in a wheelchair, but this was changed when Hammond, who has a restricted growth condition, impressed producers during her audition among able-bodied actors. Hammond revealed in 2015 that she had received abuse from viewers over her disability, explaining, "when I get out of my [wheel]chair to do a scene on my feet, people don't like it. If I'm feeling good and want to walk in that scene, I will. But if I can't or pain levels are bad then I'll use my chair". Hammond added because of this, she has had viewers shout at her and ask her why she uses a wheelchair after they have seen her walk in episodes. Hammond added, "People always think I'm this feisty girl and I can hold my own but in those moments you just don't think of anything to say. It's shock and disbelief. I have to laugh it off".

Hammond told Inside Soap that whilst Donna is initially "very opinionated", there would be a humorous side to her. Hammond explained, "I don't want her to just be a hard-faced cow. There needs to be a glint in her eye, tinged with a bit of sarcasm as well". Hammond admitted that she found it hard to "launch into being such a fiery character", but when she settled in, she thought, "This is fun - people will hate me!" Donna's official profile on the BBC website revealed that "abrasive personality" covers her "hidden depths" and called her intelligent and opinionated. It also revealed that she works hard on her business and "swears by her unfaltering work", but teased that due to this, Donna's love life and other aspects of her life have "slid". They added that whilst Donna is hoping to find the right man, her "abrasive personality" may make it harder to find him. Metro reported that Donna would be a "loudmouth" who "always has to be top dog and will go to any lengths to achieve this"; they added, "Never one to let her guard down, Donna takes no prisoners and always has to have the last word. But is her in-your-face persona all a front?"

== Development ==
=== Introduction and relationships ===
Hammond made her first appearance as Donna in the episode that originally aired on 14 April 2014. Donna debuted during an ongoing storyline revolving around the potential closure of Bridge Street market, which worries many characters. Donna immediately gets on the wrong side of Bianca Jackson (Patsy Palmer) and Kat Slater (Jessie Wallace), who confront her after incorrectly assuming that she is someone from the council. Speaking of Donna's debut scenes, Hammond said, "Not only did I come in on my first day as someone who is difficult and a bit nosey, but I had to do it with Kat and Bianca! They are really strong women, so it was daunting. But Patsy and Jessie have always been a good laugh in between scenes, so it was very easy to settle in." Hammond called Palmer her "mentor" who offered to help her with any questions that she had. Donna's clothes stall is later moved from Spring Lane Market to Bridge Street, which angers many residents. Donna does not try to be nice to other residents, but she ends up bonding with Kat after the latter is scarred in a housefire. Hammond explained, "Because Donna's disabled – the way I am – she's used to getting looked at and dealing with negative comments around that, so I think there might be a holding of hands on that". Donna's friend Pam Coker (Lin Blakley) later tries to get Donna and Kat closer together but they are not "fooled for a moment".

In October 2014, Hammond teased that viewers would learn more about Donna's backstory, adding, "We'll get to know a little bit more about her life rather than the market stall and the bitchy-bitchy: more about who she is and where she has come from". In January 2015, Donna moves to Albert Square, with it being teased that viewers would be teasing more of the character. Donna's foster mother, Claudette Hubbard (Ellen Thomas), and her foster brother Vincent Hubbard (Richard Blackwood), were introduced later in 2015. Vincent and Donna were characterised as having a close bond and being "deeply loyal to each other". The following year, Donna is left with a "tough dilemma" when Claudette asks her to talk to Vincent for her, hoping that Donna will get him to forgive and bring the family back together; although she is initially torn, Donna does try to talk to Vincent but he responds angrily and leaves, saying that he does even want to talk about his mother. Hammond later explained that whilst Donna has not forgiven Claudette, she misses her and wants to see her fix things with Vincent and wants her family together.

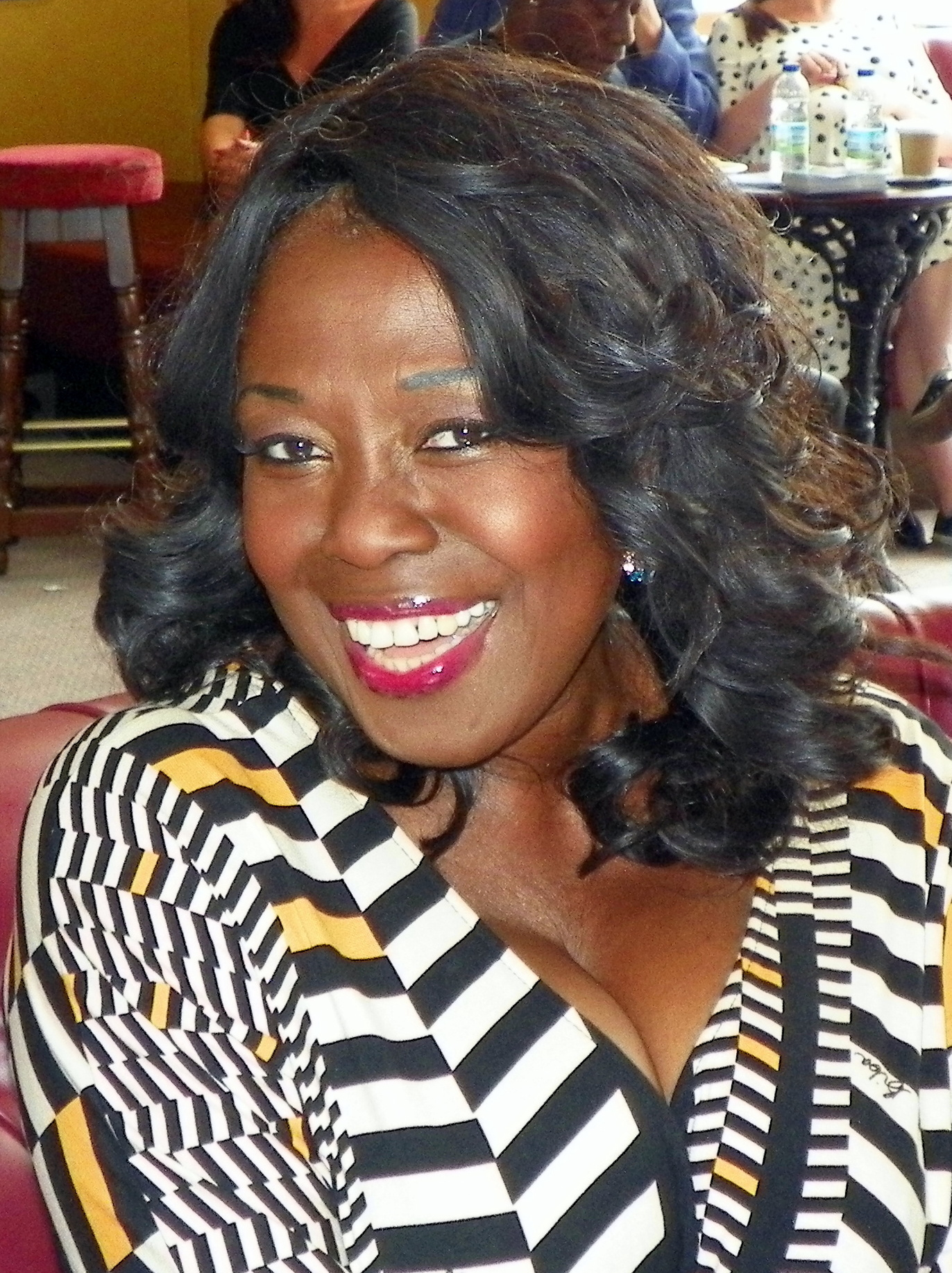
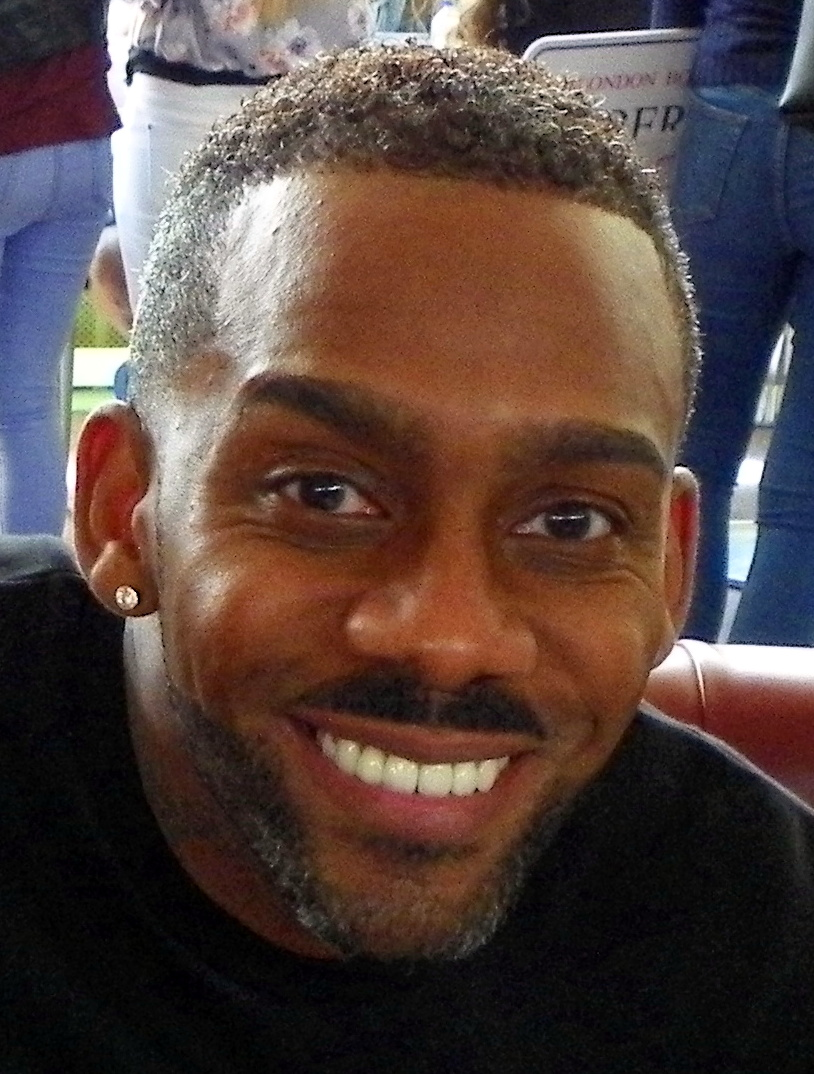
Ellen Thomas (left) and Richard Blackwood (right) portray Donna's foster mother and brother, respectively

Throughout her time in the soap, several of Donna's storylines focused on her loyalty to her friends, such as when she tells Pam that she suspects that her husband Less (Roger Sloman) is having an affair and when she stands up for Nancy Carter (Maddy Hill) when she is fighting with her family. In 2017, Donna moves into a house share with Abi Branning (Lorna Fitzgerald), Ben Mitchell (Harry Reid) and Jay Brown (Jamie Borthwick) and becomes especially good friends with Abi, sticking by her when she reveals that she is having an affair with her sister's boyfriend Steven Beale (Aaron Sidwell). Donna was often seen clashing with Vincent's wife, Kim Fox (Tameka Empson). In November 2016, Kim and Donna have an argument after she steals Donna's blue badge for her own use despite not being disabled. After this is discovered and Kim also admits to sometimes using the disabled toilets, so Donna berates her and tells her and tells her what life is like for her being disabled and tells her to not do it as it is wrong. This scene was praised by viewers on social media for highlighting disability awareness, with Digital Spy suggesting that it was part of EastEnders' attempt to incorporate some "down-to-earth storylines" into the soap.

=== Romances with Fatboy and Shrimpy ===
In 2015, Donna had a short-lived romance with Fatboy Chubb (Ricky Norwood), who she had been friends with beforehand. A writer from Bournemouth Daily Echo believed that viewers would see a softer side to Donna due to her romance with Fatboy. Hammond believed that the pair were well-suited for each other as they were already good friends. She added, "Fatboy has got a bit of an edge to him, but he’s very nice. Donna's probably gone for a flash guy in the past, but Fats is kind-hearted and he can handle her attitude as well". Hammond revealed that she and Norwood had to refilm their kissing scene several as things kept going wrong in the studio, such as a light cracking, which Hammond found humorous. She joked, "Myself and Ricky just resigned ourselves to the fact that we would have to keep kissing over and over!" Hammond had high emotions about the scene as it was her first onscreen kiss on EastEnders, but credited her "brilliant" director and Norwood's professionalism to making her feel comfortable. She added that she was happy that she had been able to get to know Norwood for over a year before kissing him in contrast to other projects where she had to kiss actors after only knowing them for a day.

In the storyline, Donna and Fatboy begin a close friendship, but Donna begins to develop feelings for him, which leads to her flirting with him; they then kiss and spend the night together. After this, it becomes clear that Donna and Fatboy want different things as the news about them spreads across Albert Square, as Fatboy sees Donna as just a friend. Fatboy ends up asking Donna out for a drink, but he later breaks things off with her. When Vincent – who was not a fan of the pairing – finds out how Fatboy treated Donna, he visits Fatboy's home and takes "shocking action" to teach him a lesson, which scares him. It was teased that Vincent's revenge could go "too far". Hammond had previously told Inside Soap that there would be some "interesting" scenes where Vincent would be a "bit too up in [Donna's] business" regarding men, which Hammond believed was "very authentic" to "tackle".

In December 2016, Donna dances and flirts with Shrimpy (Ben Champniss), an EastEnders extra, at a party. However, Donna's intoxicated friend Roxy Mitchell (Rita Simons) spots this and she tries to get his attention instead and they dance together. The following Valentines Day, Shrimpy attempts to ask Donna out, but he is too shy to do it himself, so Tina Carter (Luisa Bradshaw-White) gives her the chocolates from him instead.

=== Attempted pregnancy ===
In 2016, Donna was involved in a controversial storyline where she attempts to get pregnant with Vincent's sperm. In the storyline, Donna becomes desperate to start a family of her own but has to go to "extreme lengths" to do this as she does not have a boyfriend. Hammond explained to Inside Soap that Donna wants children of her own as not only has she always wanted children, but also because she feels lonely. Donna becomes so desperate that she even asks her good friend Kush Kazemi (Davood Ghadami) to father her child. Donna confides in her friend Pam about having a child, who tries to encourage her to apply to be the new market inspector to take her mind off it.

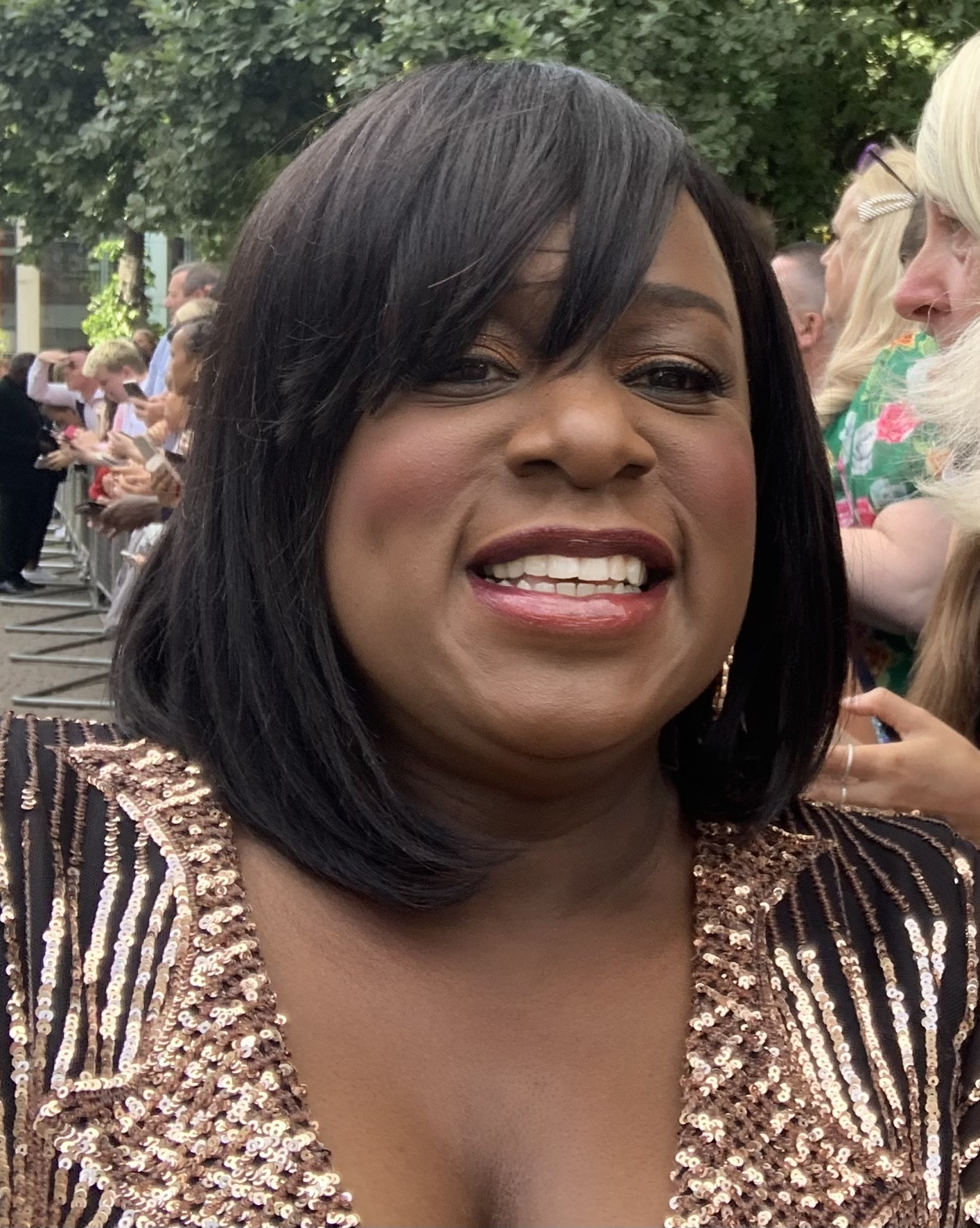
Tameka Empson portrays Kim, who is not supportive of Donna's idea.

Donna then decides to ask Vincent. Hammond explained that Vincent would be shocked by Donna's request, as he knew that Donna was seriously looking into having a child, he was not anticipating that she would ask him to help her. Explaining Donna's reasoning, Hammond explained, "Donna looks around at the men in her life and sees how Vincent is with Pearl. She loves the way he is with his daughter [Pearl], and regardless of some of the other things he might get up to, Donna believes he would always be there for her, no matter what". Vincent initially responds to Donna's suggestion by "flying off the handle" and refusing, but he later comes round to the idea after Donna explains her reasoning; however, he finds it difficult to persuade his wife and Pearl's mother, Kim, to agree to the idea. Hammond revealed, "Kim loses it! She thinks it's a ridiculous suggestion, and after considering all the logistics involved, she realises it would mean she'd be forced into some kind of relationship with Donna. And they've never been best of friends." Laura-Jayne Tyler from Inside Soap observed that Kim had not factored in Vincent and Donna's bond. Kim also tries to stop the plan by telling Claudette about what Vincent and Donna are planning as she believes that she will be against it and talk them out of it, although this is not the case.

=== Rivalry and romance with Robbie ===
Donna is given a new love interest – her colleague, Robbie Jackson (Dean Gaffney). Robbie, who had debuted in 1993, was reintroduced as a regular character in June 2017 and is revealed to be the new enforcement officer of Donna's market. The pair initially do not get on and argue, which Gaffney called a "clash of personalities". Speaking about the reason of Donna and Robbie's clash to Digital Spy, Gaffney said, "I think it's purely because [Donna] sees this anal character coming in throwing his weight about. And also there's a discrepancy with her stall – will she lose the stall? And Robbie is the reason why she might or might not". However, Gaffney also revealed that what they had been filmed afterwards "kind of rectifies that so we've come full circle in a short space of time". In the storyline, Robbie annoys his colleagues with his attitude and he briefly evicts Donna from her pitch when she does not pay her fees on time, leading to her colleagues getting revenge on her before he changes his mind.

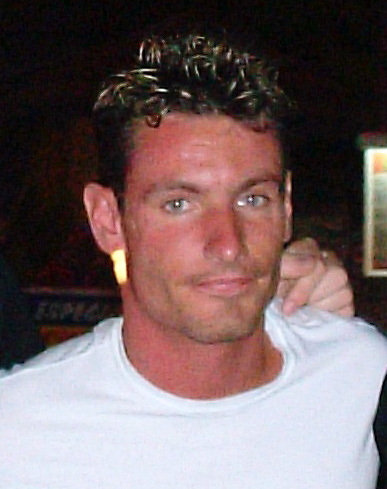
Dean Gaffney portrays Donna's love interest, Robbie.

Sophie Dainty from Digital Spy hinted later in 2017 that there could be a "spark" between Donna and Robbie when Donna winds him up and, trying to lift his spirits, "demands" that he takes her out on a date after he is jilted by a woman that he had met online. However, Donna then tries to "wreak havoc" for Robbie when he is given a chance to meet again with the woman that he met online. Gaffney had previously teased that Robbie would "find love". Robbie and Donna's "chemistry" is revisited in December 2017 when, after several more weeks of banter between the pair, Robbie tells Donna that he is fed up of always being made fun of by her. Whitney Dean (Shona McGarty) decides to matchmake the pair as she believes that there is an "underlying passion" between them, so she locks them in the kitchen of the Queen Vic pub in attempt to help them realise their true feelings. Whilst locked in, Robbie and Donna bond and Donna offers to help Robbie with his troubles, and the pair almost kiss before being interrupted by Whitney opening the door. Although the pair are embarrassed by their near-kiss, they end up helping each other when the market is threatened with closure and they then arrange to meet again, leaving Donna to go to big efforts as she believes that she is going on a date with Robbie. Donna supports Robbie as he is awaiting updates about the market closure and he buys her a "thoughtful" Christmas present, but he accidentally gives her the wrong gift. Donna is humiliated and throws a drink in his face and tells everyone that the market may be closing, but she regrets her actions when she finds out what Robbie really got her. Robbie and Donna later begin a relationship and later move in together. When Donna gets into an argument with Hayley Slater (Katie Jarvis) in the pub, Robbie calls Donna his girlfriend and tells Hayley to leave him alone, which leads to him accidentally getting into a fight with Stuart Highway (Ricky Champ) by accident.

=== Departure ===
On 10 April 2018, it was announced that Hammond would be leaving EastEnders as Donna. Speaking about her exit, Hammond said, "It's been so great to play Donna for the past four years. I've made lifelong friends at EastEnders and will really miss all of the brilliant cast and crew who have always been a pleasure to work with! I look forward to what the future brings". Hammond was one of several EastEnders cast members to announce their departures in 2018, including Blackwood as Vincent. An EastEnders spokesperson confirmed Hammond's departure and said "Lisa has been a fantastic addition to the cast and she will be missed. We wish her all the very best for the future". It was reported that at Hammond was still filming at the time of the announcement. Hammond wrote on Twitter that she was both happy and sad to leave the soap opera.

Hammond made her final appearance as Donna in the episode broadcast on 20 July of that year. In the storyline, Donna plants drugs on recovering drug addict Rainie Cross (Tanya Franks) to get her addicted again and make her appear to be an unfit carer for now-deceased Abi's daughter of the same name. Donna apologises to Rainie's husband Max Branning (Jake Wood) and blames Rainie's mother Cora Cross (Ann Mitchell) for making her doubt Donna's ability to look after Abi, and the pair sort things out, but Robbie confronts Donna after finding out what she did and is also angry that she did not tell him. Robbie contemplates their future but Max tells him to figure Donna as she is a good person. However, Robbie returns home to discover that Donna has taken her stuff and left without saying goodbye, whilst Donna departs Walford in her taxi and accidentally encounters Rainie, who tells Donna to take a long break from Walford. Donna's exit aired in the middle of the episode, and thus she did not get the traditional cliffhanger theme tune. After discovering that Donna has left him for good, Robbie is "crestfallen" and heartbroken and struggles with her departure.

== Storylines ==
Donna comes to Albert Square to assess her competition after it is decided to merge Spring Lane market with Bridge Street market and she later clashes with Kat Moon (Jessie Wallace) and Bianca Butcher (Patsy Palmer) as they also sell clothes. Donna causes controversy when she refuses to wear a black armband as a mark of respect for the recently murdered Lucy Beale (Hetti Bywater) as she does not want to put buyers off. Donna fancies Terry Spraggan (Terry Alderton) and dislikes his former wife, Nikki Spraggan (Rachel Wilde). Donna causes more controversy when she is rude about Patrick Trueman's (Rudolph Walker) stroke and clashes with fellow stallholder Fatboy Chubb (Ricky Norwood), but she is friends with stallholder Pam Coker (Lin Blakley), who used to be Donna's social worker and placed Donna with her foster family years ago. Pam helps Donna to see a brighter side to life, encouraging her to be friendly with Kat and getting her a Valentines Day date. Donna and Fatboy clash again but she tries to patch things up between them. Donna later lies that she has to go to a salon appointment when she is actually going to the hospital. When she cannot get a taxi, Fatboy drives her, and she tells him that she regularly gets goes there for blood tests and painkiller injections to prolong the energy she has before undergoing joint replacement, and that she lied so that Pam does not worry about her.

At Donna's 30th birthday organised by Pam, Martin Fowler (James Bye) shows in an interest in her, but Fatboy punches him when it becomes clear that he is just trying to annoy his estranged wife Sonia Fowler (Natalie Cassidy). An upset Donna leaves the party, but she is happy when Fatboy gives her his hoodie as a gift and when Pam reveals that she invited Donna's foster mother Claudette Hubbard (Ellen Thomas). Donna is shocked when she finds out that her foster brother Vincent Hubbard (Richard Blackwood) is married to her neighbour Kim Fox (Tameka Empson) and the father of her daughter. Kim incorrectly assumes that Donna is Vincent's girlfriend when she sees them together but Donna corrects her. She ends up getting into a fight with Kim when she calls her half-sister Denise Fox (Diane Parish) a dog, so Kim stabs her wheelchair with a fork. Donna upsets Kim when she reveals Vincent's involvement with Ronnie Mitchell (Samantha Womack).

Donna and Fatboy end up flirting and then kiss and have sex. However, whilst Donna wants something more with him, Fatboy feels that the gossip is making their friendship awkward and he tells Donna this, who does not take it well. She goes to Claudette's house in tears and says that she wants a long-term relationship with someone who loves her the way she is. There, she finds Pam's husband Les Coker (Roger Sloman) in his underwear and assumes that he is having an affair with Claudette, though they both deny it. Donna tells Pam what she saw, though it is later revealed that they are not involved romantically and Claudette was supporting Les with his cross-dressing. Vincent confronts Fatboy for his treatment of Donna and locks him in a staircase, but after taking Vincent's advice Fatboy tells Donna that he will be showing his true self to her. However, the relationship does not last and Fatboy leaves Walford. Donna is confused when Claudette disappears and Vincent lies that she left to stay with her sister. Donna reveals to Vincent that Claudette told her that he buried her in his basement after she fell down the stairs, so Vincent tells Donna that Claudette killed his father, Henry, and indirectly had Fatboy killed too. Claudette, who has returned, claims that Henry's death was an accident and Donna accuses Claudette of only fostering her to ease her guilt. Donna continues seeing Claudette in secret and tries to get her to reconcile with Vincent, which is initially unsuccessful.

Donna gets drunk and asks Kush Kazemi (Davood Ghadami) to father a child for her, but she regrets it the following day. Pam encourages Donna to apply to be market inspector, and she tells her that she wants to start a family. Donna asks Vincent to be the father of her child and he eventually accepts to Kim's horror. Kim tries to get Claudette to stop it but she does not. Donna inseminates herself with Vincent's donated sperm but she does not get pregnant. Donna wants to try again but she then decides that she will not be able to raise a baby by herself and Kim tells her that she will find the right man. Donna is injured when a bus crashes into the market but she is saved by Vincent, although her wheelchair is crushed. Donna moves into a house share with Abi Branning (Lorna Fitzgerald), Ben Mitchell (Harry Reid) and Jay Brown (Jamie Borthwick) and becomes close with them. Donna clashes with the market enforcement officer Robbie Jackson (Dean Gaffney) but the pair eventually become friends and make a lot of jokes. Donna and Robbie develop feelings for each other but do not act on them, so Whitney Dean (Shona McGarty) locks them in a room together and they confide in each other and almost kiss. Donna supports Robbie with some market issues and they eventually begin dating and even move in together.

Donna is upset when Abi dies and she develops a feud with Robbie's uncle and Abi's father Max Branning (Jake Wood) and his wife Rainie Cross (Tanya Franks), who are trying to get custody of Abi's daughter of the same name. After being convinced by Rainie's mother Cora Cross (Ann Mitchell) that Rainie is an unfit parent, Donna posts drugs through Rainie's letterbox to make it appear that she is using drugs again and is an unfit parent. When this is exposed, Rainie and Robbie are angry with Donna and Robbie contemplates their future. Donna apologises to Max and he convinces Robbie to give his relationship with Donna another chance; however, he discovers that she has left without saying goodbye, and Donna departs Walford in a taxi, devastating Robbie.

== Reception ==
For her role as Donna, Hammond was longlisted for "Best Bitch" at the 2014 Inside Soap Awards. She was later shortlisted for "Funniest Female" at the 2017 Inside Soap Awards.

Carl Greenwood from the Daily Mirror called Donna a "bolshie market stall holder" who was "desperate" to have her own child for "some time". He called Donna's attempt to have a baby with Vincent one of EastEnders' "most controversial storylines yet" and called Donna's idea "weird even for Walford". Greenwood and his colleague Danny Walker also reported that viewers had called Donna's request to Vincent to father her child "weird" on Twitter. The writers added that Donna was going to "extraordinary lengths" to get a potential father. Laura-Jayne Tyler from Inside Soap called Donna's "eye-opening request" a "massive shock" for Vincent, adding that whilst he might be devoted to his family, he did not expect Donna to ask him this. Tyler also thought it was to be expected that Vincent would be shocked by her request. In October 2014, Tina Campbell from Metro wrote that Donna had "hardly gone out of her way to be nice to anyone" since her debut, and called the potential friendship between her and Kat "unlikely". Campbell's colleague, Caroline Westbrook, wrote that Donna "wasted no time making her mark on Walford". Duncan Lindsay from the same website wrote that Hammond was "known" and "loved" by EastEnders fans as "feisty market stall holder" and noted that while she had "largely favourable" responses from viewers, Hammond had received abuse from viewers when she appeared in scenes without her wheelchair. Lindsay also believed that Donna was in the "centre of the action" after her night with Fatboy. Natasha Sporn from the Evening Standard wrote, "Stallholder Donna has become a fan favourite over the years with her wit and sharp tongue and has been involved in many emotional storylines including her discovery of foster mother Claudette Hubbard's true colours and her desire to have a baby". A writer from TV Times in 2017 called Donna a "fiery market trader". Sharnaz Shahid from Hello! called Donna "mouthy" and noted that she had been "integral in various storylines". In 2023, Angie Quinn from MyLondon opined that Donna was a "strong female force" who was "full of grit, intelligence and took no nonsense" from other characters, especially Robbie. Quinn also described Donna's rivalry with Kat "fierce".

"Never one to beat around the bush, Donna was certainly not backwards about coming forwards and didn't take any prisoners. But in a town full of secrets and lies, Donna' no-nonsense, abrasive and often quite blunt approach to life was a breath of fresh air in Walford. Donna didn't do tea and sympathy, didn't go round the houses, and didn't really care what people thought of her. And we champion her for that."

— Sophie Dainty from Digital Spy on Donna (2018)

Daniel Kilkelly from Digital Spy praised the scene where Donna berated Kim for using her blue badge and noted how viewers applauded the soap on social media for raising disability awareness. He also noted how "no-nonsense" Donna had made Kim speechless "for once". Kilkelly later called Roxy, Donna and Shrimpy's brief "love triangle" the "most surprising Christmas spoiler of all" and asked "Whatever happened to the girl code, Roxy?" Duncan Lindsay from Metro wrote that Donna was "only human" for wanting to get close to Shrimpy. Nicole Douglas from OK! reported how some viewers on social media wanted Shrimpy and Donna to get together after he attempted to ask her out on Valentines Day. Discussing the plot where Robbie and Donna were locked in the kitchen, Aoife Kelly from the Irish Independent reported how viewers were confused and "amused" that the pair did not use the fire door to leave; Kelly questioned whether Robbie and Donna "were simply ignoring the sign all along" as they ended up almost kissing. Nicole Douglas from OK! also reported this, and wrote how viewers were "desperate" to see Robbie and Donna together after their intimate moment together. Tess Lamacraft from Closer Online called Robbie and Donna "star-crossed lovers", believing that it was "obvious" that they liked each other but were too proud to make their "first move". Lamacraft was hopeful that the pair would start a romance and expressed disappointment that Whitney interrupted their near-kiss.

Following the news of Donna's departure, Matt Bagwell from HuffPost wrote "Another one bites the dust".Stephanie Chase from Digital Spy called Donna's departure "hasty" and noted how viewers bided a "not-so-fond farewell" to her, adding that some viewers did not have "much sympathy" on social media for her after what she did to Rainie. Chase believed that it was understandable that Robbie was upset at what she did. Chase also reported that some viewers expressed on social media that they were sad to see Donna depart. A writer from Entertainment Daily called Donna's departure a "heartbreaking twist" and reported how viewers were sad to see the character depart. Keeley Ryan from Her.ie also called Donna's exit "hasty" and reported how viewers were unimpressed and angry over her "low-key" exit, writing, "many believed Donna deserved a better storyline – and she didn't even get the famous duff duff duffs". Beth Allcock from OK! reported how viewers were disappointed with Donna's exit, with some criticising the fact that she left in the middle of the episode and thus did not get the "signature theme tune", the "famous" cliffhanger "doof doof". However, Allcock noted how Donna departed in EastEnders' "traditional London Black Cab method". Kyle O'Sullivan from the Daily Mirror called Donna's departure a "devastating end" as she was "so close to finding happiness for the first time", in addition to being a "low key but surprising twist of events".

Donna was considered to be one of the soap's "favourite personalities" by Emma Costello from RSVP Live. On the day of Donna's final episode, Sophie Dainty from Digital Spy released an article giving seven reasons as to why the character would be missed, which she attributed to Donna's one-liners, her "rebellious streak", her "no-nonsense attitude", her loyalty to the ones that she loves, her relationship with Robbie and her clashes with Kim and other characters. Dainty wrote that the soap would be a "quieter place" without Donna, and she noted how Donna would provide viewers with "some much-needed chuckles" with her dry humour amongst the "doom and gloom", even if it was not always intentionally, and how her "unpredictable nature" kept viewers gripped.
