= Vincent Hubbard =

Fictional British television character

- EastEnders character
- Portrayed by: Richard Blackwood
- Duration: 2015–2018
- First appearance: Episode 5015; 17 February 2015
- Last appearance: Episode 5693; 20 April 2018
- Created by: Dominic Treadwell-Collins
- Introduced by: Dominic Treadwell-Collins
In-universe information
- Occupation: Career criminal; Businessman; Barman; Police informant
- Father: Henry Hubbard
- Mother: Claudette Hubbard
- Wife: Kim Fox (2013–2018)
- Sons: Mica Fox
- Daughters: Pearl Fox

Vincent Hubbard is a fictional character from the BBC soap opera EastEnders, played by Richard Blackwood. He was introduced by executive producer Dominic Treadwell-Collins during the show's 30th anniversary celebrations, and was later revealed to be the husband of established character Kim Fox (Tameka Empson). He made his first appearance on 17 February 2015 during the show's 5015th episode, and returned on two occasions on 19 February, one of which was in a flashback episode in which he gives Ronnie Mitchell (Samantha Womack) a gun. During these appearances, he is only credited as "Vincent", concealing his connection to Kim. He returned as a regular character on 21 April 2015.

Blackwood praised bosses for the character of Vincent, stating he knew that his portrayal would surprise viewers given his comedy background. He is described on the BBC website as a smooth operator, whose easy charm and quick wittedness covers a steely, ruthless streak and a reputation as a bit of a bad boy. They also state that Vincent believes himself to be the "main man" in the room, and knows how to play people to his advantage. Despite not appearing until February 2015, the character was foreshadowed by Kim's off-screen marriage during 2014. Blackwood's departure from the series was confirmed on 19 March 2018. He made his last appearance on 20 April 2018. The character was confirmed dead in October 2021.

== Creation and development ==
=== Casting and introduction ===
Richard Blackwood's casting was announced on 17 January 2015, where it was revealed that Blackwood would make his debut in the show during a live scene on 17 February 2015. He admitted to being nervous, but welcomed into the show with open arms. "I've got to say Jessie [Wallace] and Letitia [Dean] and all the guys, they really made me feel at ease. Adam [Woodyatt] is the nicest guy. He was checking I was alright and all of them made me feel at home." When asked about rehearsing for his live debut, he explained: "They are very pedantic here. The opening scene you saw us do, we rehearsed 20 times. They don't play around and you've got to hit your mark. It has got to be spot on."

Vincent was described as being "connected to everybody" on the square. Commenting on his role, Blackwood said: "I [want to] thank Dominic [Treadwell-Collins] and Julia [Crampsie] for giving me this amazing opportunity. EastEnders is a show I've grown up watching, so to film on Albert Square is something I'll never get used to! To know my first-ever scene will be a live one hopefully means the team believe in me and I won't let them down!" Treadwell-Collins said that Blackwood would bring "warmth, humour and energy, which will add so many layers to this 21st century EastEnders villain." The character was described as "your best friend, and your worst enemy", with Blackwood adding that "he has just got layers, villain is just too basic of a word. He is connected to enough people." Blackwood later stated that Vincent isn't a psychopath, but said that he has a "dark side". He added: "If you are in that world, then he will be dark with you, but to anybody else he's cool. He has got a heart but to the villains, he is villainous."

Vincent is the son of Claudette Hubbard (Ellen Thomas) and has many ties to other characters. He was born and brought up in Walford and knew the Mitchell family, including Phil Mitchell (Steve McFadden). His father was infamous in the area and knew Eric Mitchell and Den Watts (Leslie Grantham). Vincent had a relationship with Ronnie Mitchell (Samantha Womack), who he had a lot of history with, said to have happened in 2013. It ended abruptly when Ronnie departed Walford for Ibiza, although they meet once more when Vincent gives Ronnie a gun on Good Friday 2014 (as seen in a flashback episode broadcast on 19 February 2015).

Vincent's recent history also included his marriage to established character Kim Fox (Tameka Empson), who had been off-screen during 2014 due to Empson's maternity leave. Kim had been on a cruise holiday, informing her family that she had married while away and returning to Walford alone and pregnant in December 2014. Following Vincent's introduction, it is explained that Kim had abandoned him after seeing him covered in blood.

=== Storyline development ===
On 14 April 2015, it was revealed that EastEnders would be revisiting Vincent's backstory. Following the character's permanent return to the square on 21 April, it transpired that he was the son and foster brother of established characters Claudette Hubbard (Ellen Thomas) and Donna Yates (Lisa Hammond) respectively. Blackwood told Radio Times that the character will get darker as his time on the show progresses. "There's a lot more. Wait until you see some of the scenes coming up - they raise the hairs." He began. "The writers on EastEnders know what they're doing. They grab you and keep you watching. I've just spoken to them actually and they said, 'we've got a lot more you'. So the audience is in for some trouble!" Speaking about the future of Vincent on the show, Blackwood said: "The thing about Vincent that I love is that he’s very human. He’s got a dark side, but he only acts that way with people who are in the same realm as him. So if you’re in the underworld, he’s very much like that. But if you’re an innocent person, then he won’t mess with you."

=== Notable relationships ===
Vincent's relationship with Ronnie Mitchell (Samantha Womack) was alluded to during his first screen appearance after he visited her whilst she was in a coma. It later transpired that he was married to established character Kim Fox (Tameka Empson). His relationship with the two characters added to the contrast of his dark and light personality, which was made clear following his original appearances. With Ronnie, he was shown to be more villainous having given her a gun and committed to several dirty deeds prior to meeting Kim; his scenes with Kim showed him to be more caring and laid-back, wanting to be a father figure for their daughter, Pearl.

=== Departure ===
It was announced on 19 March 2018 that Blackwood would depart the series in Spring 2018, after three years in the role. Writers pitched a storyline for Vincent which would conclude with his departure, and Blackwood accepted the idea. Blackwood felt it would be the correct time to leave the show, and told entertainment website Digital Spy that he had enjoyed his time on the show and felt "truly blessed" to have been given his storylines. He added, "when I was presented with my last story, I knew it was time for Vincent to depart Walford." A show spokesperson confirmed the news and wished Blackwood well for the future. His last scenes aired on 20 April 2018.

== Storylines ==
Vincent arrives in Albert Square having followed Phil Mitchell (Steve McFadden) home, confronting him and Billy Mitchell (Perry Fenwick) about the whereabouts of Ronnie Mitchell (Samantha Womack), a former flame. Phil recognises Vincent and warns Billy that he's bad news. Billy reveals to Vincent that Ronnie is in a coma at Walford General Hospital following a car crash on New Year's Day and, upon visiting the hospital, leaves a white rose for Ronnie so she knows he's visited. During the wedding reception of Ian (Adam Woodyatt) and Jane Beale (Laurie Brett), Denise Fox (Diane Parish) mocks her sister Kim Fox's (Tameka Empson) relationship with Vincent, her husband, as she goes into premature labour with his child. Vincent watches from afar as she is taken to hospital, and Kim later explains to Patrick Trueman (Rudolph Walker) that she ran away from Vincent after walking in on him covered in blood and, thus, chose not to tell him she was pregnant. She becomes wary when he tries to contact her again after witnessing her with their daughter, Pearl, and is scared when she finds someone has given Pearl a toy, instantly believing it was Vincent (though it is later revealed to be Denise). Kim tells Denise that Vincent never existed and Pearl was the result of a one-night stand, but later admits the truth and explains her experience when she went to tell him she was pregnant.

The following month, Vincent sends Ronnie a "get well soon" card after hearing she has awoken from her coma, and later visits her. He reminds her of the times they spent with each other when he owned a bar and attempts to romance her, but she quickly informs him that she is married to Charlie Cotton (Declan Bennett). He leaves, and Ronnie later explains to her sister, Roxy Mitchell (Rita Simons), that she and Vincent were in a relationship before they left for Ibiza. Vincent visits Kim, who reveals what she saw him getting up to at his flat and he explained that he was helping a victim of a mugging, giving her a news article stating he'd saved the man's life. Whilst in Albert Square, Vincent decides to pay a visit to his foster sister, Donna Yates (Lisa Hammond), and reveals to her that he is Pearl's father, leaving her shocked as she did not see Kim as his type. He also confesses to her that he is close with Ronnie. Following their conversation, he decides he wants to repair his marriage with Kim for the sake of their baby, but is thrown when Ronnie requests him to find some way of preventing a drug dealer from testifying against her former grandmother-in-law Dot Branning (June Brown) during her murder trial, which he refuses. However, Ronnie reminds him that she still has the gun he gave her, so he lends her the favour. Ronnie begins to repel Vincent and he begins visiting her more often in hospital, eventually revealing to her that he believes that it was Ronnie's cousin, Phil, who killed Carl White (Daniel Coonan), when it was actually her. When Ronnie finds out he has got the wrong end of the stick, she asks Phil to confront him. Phil approaches Vincent, threatening to kill one of his family members if he doesn't leave Ronnie alone. However, Vincent punches him and warns him to back off. Vincent later visits Kim and pledges he wants to be a father to Pearl, but is interrupted when the police arrest him in connection to the assault of the drug dealer, and later convinces Kim to give him a false alibi for the encounter. Following this, Kim forces Vincent to promise her no more lies, and Donna is disheartened to find they have reunited, bitterly revealing to Kim that Vincent had dated Ronnie.

Vincent reunites with Kim having promised her that he and Ronnie are no longer together. He later approaches Phil after finding out he was the cause of his arrest and blackmails him, threatening to reveal Ronnie as Carl's murderer if he does not hand The Albert over to him. Phil's wife Sharon Mitchell (Letitia Dean) disapproves of this, and she and Vincent are forced to share the business. Phil grows irritable about Vincent's involvement in the business and, when Vincent changes the name of The Albert to "Pearl's", Phil attacks him. Kim decides to end their marriage after seeing him covered in blood, but he soon is able to change her mind. Patrick is initially distrusting of Vincent, but they soon begin to bond slowly, especially after Vincent finds an old record Patrick recorded with his former band. Soon after, Vincent kisses Ronnie, but says it was only to show he still could.

After Ronnie and Vincent have sex, Ronnie tells Charlie that their marriage is over. When Charlie fights for custody of their son Matthew, he disappears after being confronted by Ronnie and Vincent. Kim becomes suspicious when Vincent spends long periods of time away from her, and Ronnie unintentionally arouses her suspicions while trying to assure her that she and Vincent are no longer together. Kim confronts Vincent, who later reveals to Kim that he has bought a new house for them and Pearl. Denise and Patrick believe it to be a way of keeping Kim quiet, and force him to leave. Kim misses Vincent, and although they initially agree to give each other some distance and share joint custody of Pearl, they rekindle their marriage and Kim moves in with him. Some time later, Roxy confronts Ronnie over Charlie's disappearance, so Ronnie calls Vincent to get Charlie to call Roxy, revealing that he is alive.

Ronnie is arrested for Carl's murder, but it emerges that the men who arrested her are not real police officers. Ronnie discovers that Vincent is working with the police as an informant, and used his contacts to stop her being arrested, and urges her to leave the country before she is arrested. Vincent reveals he is helping the police take down Phil, and Ronnie agrees to say nothing. When Kim finds Vincent has taken delivery of a large amount of drugs, Vincent tells her he is planning to plant them at Phil's house as revenge for Phil's father Eric (George Russo killing his own father, Henry. Phil has Vincent beaten up by a group of thugs following which Vincent blackmails Ronnie with a recording he took of her confessing to killing Carl to make her go along with the plan, but at the last minute, Ronnie turns on him, destroys the recording, and tells Phil the truth.

A feud erupts between Phil and Vincent, culminating in Phil kidnapping Pearl and Vincent threatening to shoot the Mitchells. When Pearl is found at the community centre, Vincent pretends to end the hostilities, but attempts to strangle Phil in his home the following night. He is stopped by his friend Fatboy (Ricky Norwood), so Vincent orders him to leave Walford in response. Ronnie tries to get rid of Vincent by hiring some men lock him in his car boot and have the car crushed, but Vincent is not driving the car so they get the wrong person. Assuming that Vincent's mother, Claudette Hubbard (Ellen Thomas), is in the car, he attempts to rescue her but finds Fatboy's phone and necklace amongst some blood in the boot of the crushed car at the scrapyard. He tells Ronnie the car was empty and Claudette that their feud with the Mitchells killed Fatboy and they should end it now. However, this infuriates Claudette who then compares him to his father and accidentally lets slip that Henry did not die when she said he did. When Ronnie's mother Glenda Mitchell (Glynis Barber) visits, she recognises Claudette and Vincent, and later tells Ronnie that Eric did not kill Henry because he was drunk that night and did not leave the house. Ronnie then blackmails Claudette with the information, so Claudette agrees to end the feud.

Vincent is suspicious when Claudette asks for money, and he later sees Claudette with an unconscious Gavin Sullivan (Paul Nicholas). Claudette lies that Gavin was an intruder but after Gavin escapes, Vincent finds an old photograph with Gavin, Henry and Eric, and Vincent works out Gavin was blackmailing her and she killed Henry. She also reveals that she knew Vincent would be killed so sent Fatboy in his car. When she insults Henry, Vincent chokes Claudette, as Patrick arrives and stops him before learning the truth about Henry. As Patrick tries to call the police, Claudette tries to snatch the phone off him, but falls down the basement stairs, hitting her head on a brick. Patrick leaves to get help but when he returns, Vincent has buried Claudette underneath the basement, and tells Patrick to forget it happened or they will both be arrested for murder. However, unknown to Vincent and Patrick, it is revealed Claudette is alive when she arrives in hospital brought in by paramedics after she was found by the side of a road. When Patrick says he cannot cope with covering up Claudette's death, Vincent says he can go to Trinidad until things settle down. When Patrick sees Claudette in the Square, he tells Vincent she is alive. Vincent visits Donna, and she reveals that Claudette is there and has told her that he buried her. Vincent reveals to Donna that Claudette killed Henry. He then tells her that Claudette caused Fatboy's death. Donna tells Vincent and Claudette to leave but Patrick arrives, confirming that Claudette killed Henry. Donna accuses Claudette of only fostering her as a way to ease her guilt, and Vincent tells her to leave or he will tell Gavin where she is. Patrick makes Vincent vow to protect his family and stop being involved in crime. Later, Vincent gives Donna Fatboy's necklace and she says they should stick together as he is the only family she now has.

Vincent walks in on Donna asking Kush Kazemi (Davood Ghadami) to father her baby and expresses his concerns. Donna then tells Vincent he is the only man she trusts and that she wants him to father her baby. Initially he is shocked by the idea and says no but after realising he can give Donna the thing she most wants in the world and can make her happy, he agrees, angering Kim. He convinces Kim, and Donna inseminates herself but does not get pregnant and soon after decides she needs to find a committed father. Later, Vincent realises that he misses Claudette and invites her to a family dinner and she promises that she has changed, but when Babe Smith (Annette Badland) is locked in a freezer overnight, Vincent wrongly thinks Claudette is the culprit. A few weeks later, Vincent discovers that Kim has caused him to have a parking fine. He then finds out that Kim never passed her driving test and bans her from driving until she does, deciding to teach her how to drive himself and Kim eventually passes her driving test. Vincent is distraught when he learns that Ronnie has died after drowning on her wedding day to Jack Branning (Scott Maslen) and confides in Mick Carter (Danny Dyer) about his feelings of her death.

Kim plans a holiday in Spain when Vincent informs her of a friend who owns a villa. Despite initially being reluctant, Denise agrees to accompany them along with Kush, who she is now dating. Kush's mother Carmel Kazemi (Bonnie Langford) also gets involved in the holiday. Carmel begins dating Max Branning (Jake Wood), who has recently been released from prison after being wrongly convicted of Lucy Beale's (Hetti Bywater) murder (see Who Killed Lucy Beale?). Carmel invites Max on the holiday and he agrees, but Max is secretly planning revenge on the community and just as they are all about to leave, the police turn up and arrest Vincent after they find cocaine in his car, which Max has seemingly deposited. However, Vincent manages to hush the matter up, but the arrest means that he is unable to go on holiday with Kim.

Phil is surprised to find Vincent meeting up with his old friend Aidan Maguire (Patrick Bergin). Aidan reveals that Vincent is part of a mysterious job that Aidan is leading. Phil joins them, though he is not keen on Vincent's involvement as he is a former police informant. Kim finds out that she is pregnant with her second child. However, when she suffers a miscarriage, Vincent tries to back out of the job but changes his mind when Aidan threatens to harm Pearl. Phil and Vincent are unimpressed to learn that Aidan has also hired Mick and Keanu Taylor (Danny Walters). But they are forced to go along with it by Aidan. On the day of the job, Vincent is cornered by Aidan and it is revealed that Aidan was actually seeking revenge on Vincent as his grassing to the police led to Aidan's brother killing himself. Just as Aidan is about to kill Vincent, Phil stops him. The men are later horrified to discover that the money they were going to get as a result of the job has gone missing. They dig up a coffin in a graveyard to find the money, but the coffin is empty. Aidan later tells Vincent that he wants money from him, so Vincent chooses to sell The Albert. He comes clean to Kim about Aidan's demands and the fact that they are broke. Kim is horrified to discover that Vincent has missed a mortgage payment and Aidan tells him he wants The Albert sold by the next day. Although Jack shows interest, Vincent is forced to refuse as Jack needs more time to go through with the sale. Fearing that he cannot keep up with Aidan's demands, Vincent leaves a note for Kim and abandons their house. Pearl finds Vincent's note and draws on it; Kim does not see Vincent's message but she displays Pearl's drawing on the fridge. With no buyer forthcoming, Aidan tells Vincent to sell him The Albert for £1; Vincent reluctantly agrees. Vincent tells Kim that the bar is sold, then secretly cuts up his credit cards to stop Kim spending, as she now believes their debt problems are solved. Phil then scares Aidan away from Walford.

Kim confronts Vincent over a letter saying they will be evicted due to not paying the mortgage. Vincent plans to sell his car but it is damaged in a hit-and-run; he visits a police officer saying he will exchange information on the heist for money. The officer says there has been no report of a heist but Luke Browning's (Adam Astill) body has been found and tells Vincent to find evidence that Phil was involved. Vincent is unable to do so. He then meets another police officer, who says if Vincent tells the police everything he knows about Aidan, he and his family can go into witness protection. However, he is told he needs to leave immediately, as Aidan has found out Vincent spoke to the police from Phil, who saw them talking. Vincent tries to convince Kim that they can leave immediately but she is against it and convinces him to stay. Vincent enters the car with the police officer to tell him he is not leaving, but the officer is corrupt and an ally of Aidan. The car speeds off as Phil watches on, making a phonecall telling them to only scare Vincent. The car comes to a stop and the police officer points a gun at Vincent. Vincent accepts what is about to happen but his fate is left unknown. After this, Kim finds the note from Vincent and thinks he has left her. A body is later found and Kim goes to identify it but it is not Vincent. While searching for Vincent, Kim collapses and is informed that she is pregnant again. Her search for Vincent becomes desperate as she wants him to have a role in their baby's life, however Phil continues to warn Kim and Denise that pursuing Vincent is dangerous. Kim later gives birth to Vincent's son, who is named Mica.

Over three years later, Kim overhears a call for a taxi from someone named Vince Hubbard. Thinking that Vincent is nearby, Kim comes across a children's entertainer (Delroy Atkinson) who identifies himself as Vince. Kim is rattled when she notices that he has the same wallet that Vincent had owned with his initials inscribed on it. Kim vows to find out what really happened to Vincent. Meanwhile, Phil reveals to Denise that Aidan did in fact have Vincent killed and he warns Denise to stop Kim from digging for more information about Vincent, as it could lead to fatal consequences. Vince reveals to Kim and Denise that he is actually called Howie Danes, and he has been posing as Vince to build a better life for himself. Howie says he used to work as a security guard at a site, and three years prior, he saw three men arrive on the site, but only two went back alive. Howie then retrieved the wallet from the remains of the crime. Kim later discovers that Vincent has been murdered, and breaks the news to Pearl. Kim is infuriated to discover that Denise knew of Vincent's fate and kept this from her, and vows revenge on Phil for his involvement in Vincent's death.

== Reception ==
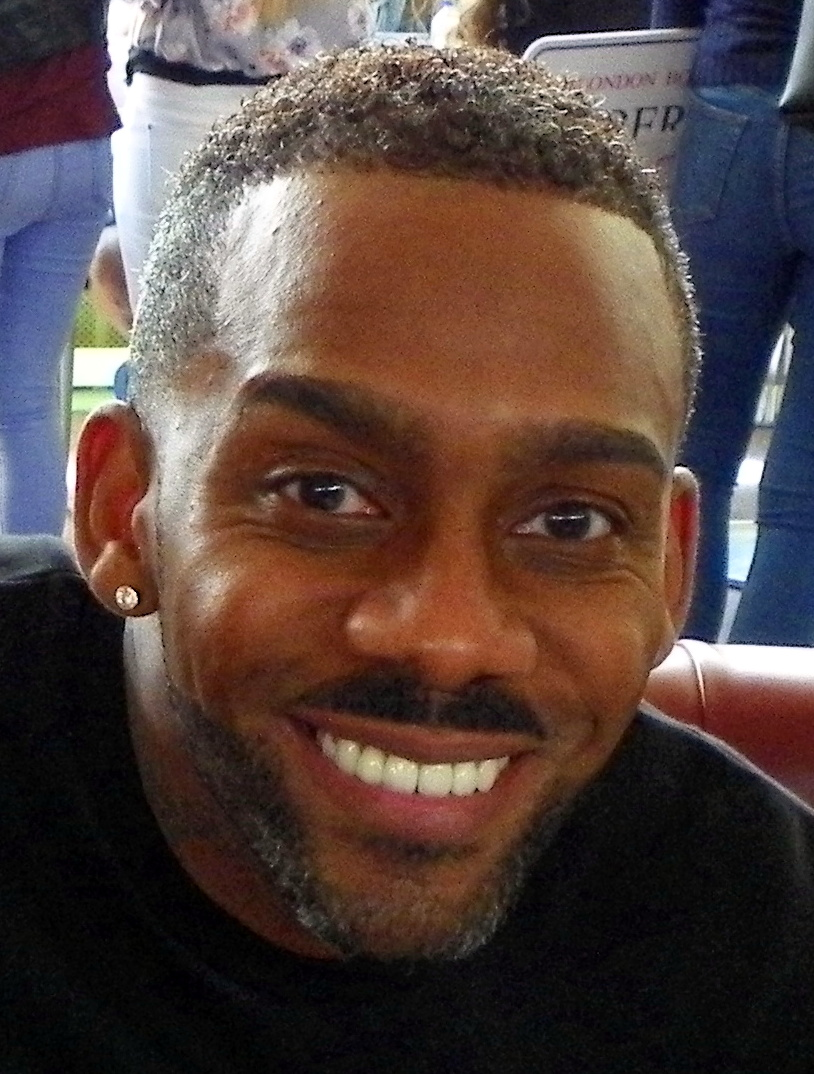
Richard Blackwood (pictured) had a mostly positive reception for his portrayal of Vincent.

Ryan Love from Digital Spy said that Vincent's backstory with Ronnie and Kim has been a "fascinating introduction", adding that "two separate characters are now linked and both under very different circumstances." He went on to say that "[the show] clearly has big plans for Vincent, and I for one can't bloody (sic) wait to see what these are after one of the most intriguing, slow-burn entrances in a long time."

Laura-Jayne Tyler from Inside Soap also commented on the character's name, saying "We love how EastEnders' Richard Blackwood still manages to be all brooding and sexy, even though he's been saddled with surely the most unsexy name in soap". The following year, Tyler bemoaned a lack of storylines for Vincent. She stated, "We love Richard Blackwood in EastEnders, but all Vincent seems to do these days is flap around after Kim. Give him a decent plot of his own, already!"

Blackwood was nominated for Best Newcomer at the TV Choice Awards and Inside Soap Awards in 2015 for his portrayal of Vincent. In August 2017, Blackwood was longlisted for Funniest Male at the Inside Soap Awards. He did not progress to the viewer-voted shortlist.

== See also ==
- List of soap opera villains
