= Fatboy (EastEnders) =

Fictional character from EastEnders

- EastEnders character
- Portrayed by: Ricky Norwood
- Duration: 2010–2015, 2023
- First appearance: Episode 3926; 5 January 2010
- Last appearance: Episode 6758; 29 August 2023
- Created by: EastEnders: E20 series 1 writing team
- Introduced by: Diederick Santer (2010); Chris Clenshaw (2023)
- Spin-off appearances: EastEnders: E20 (2010–2011); "All I Want for Christmas" (2012); Tamwar Tales – The Life of an Assistant Market Inspector (2013)
- Crossover appearances: East Street (2010)
In-universe information
- Other names: Arthur Chubb; Fat Boy (credited as)
- Occupation: DJ; Market trader; Car salesman; Fast food worker; Barman; Waiter
- Father: Ashley Chubb
- Wife: Mercy Olubunmi (2011)

Arthur "Fatboy" Chubb (also credited as Fat Boy) is a fictional character from the BBC soap opera EastEnders and its Internet spin-off EastEnders: E20, played by Ricky Norwood. He made his first appearance in EastEnders on 5 January 2010 before appearing in the spin-off. Fatboy is one of four main characters in the first series of E20 and makes cameo appearances in the second and third series. He was created by the EastEnders: E20 writing team during a BBC summer school in August 2009. He frequently uses London street slang and is described as brash, confident, caring, a hustler and a womaniser. Norwood won the Best Newcomer award at the 2010 Inside Soap Awards and Most Popular Newcomer at the 2011 National Television Awards for his portrayal of Fatboy, and has been nominated for two further awards. In 2014, Norwood was temporarily suspended from the soap for two months after a tape of improper conduct involving him leaked onto the internet. In November 2015, the character lost his nickname and was simply credited as Arthur Chubb from 20 November until his final appearance.

On 16 October 2015, it was announced that Norwood was to leave EastEnders at the end of his contract. Details of when or how Fatboy would leave were not revealed but Norwood filmed his final scenes later that month. He departed on 24 December 2015, but was killed off-screen in the next episode. In 2023, Norwood filmed an unannounced cameo appearance as part of a flashback sequence to coincide with the return of Cindy Beale (Michelle Collins), which aired on 29 August 2023.

== Creation and development ==
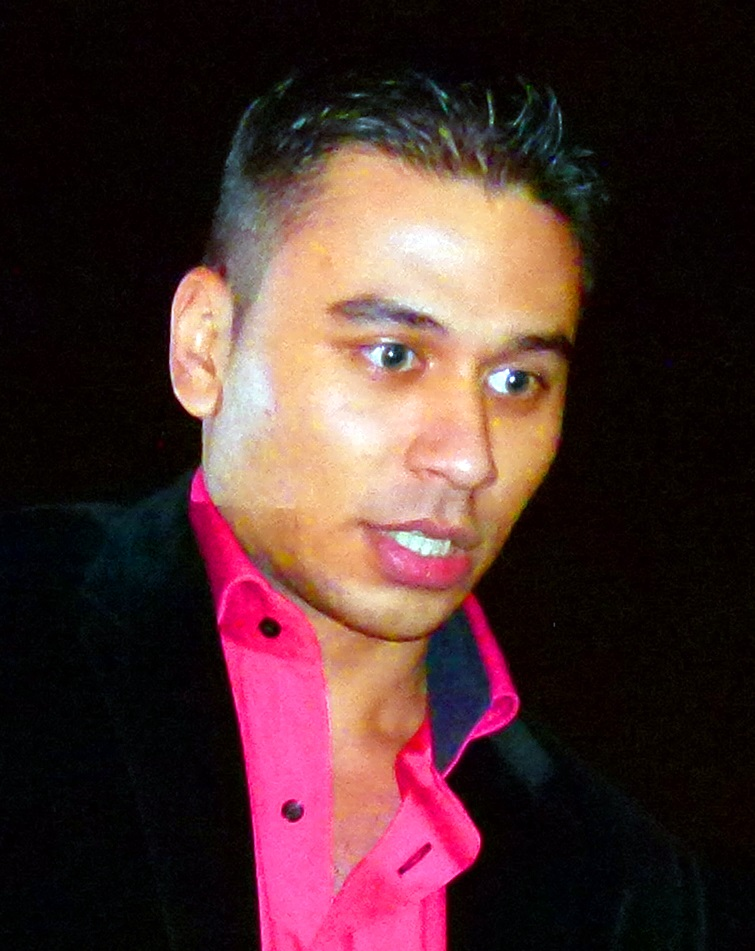
Ricky Norwood (pictured) was cast to play Fatboy in EastEnders: E20.

Fatboy is one of four characters created for the first series of the EastEnders online spin-off EastEnders: E20 who also appear in the main show, along with Zsa Zsa, Leon and Mercy. Fatboy, along with the other characters from E20, was created by the show's thirteen writers during a summer school run by the BBC in August 2009. Open auditions for the cast were held at Theatre Royal Stratford East. Norwood's casting was announced on 25 November 2009, on which he said "I am so excited to be on the show. It's an honour to now be part of a show that has been on in my house for as long as I have been alive. I am born and bred in the East End—a stone's throw from the real Albert Square. It feels like a homecoming. I love being part of a cast that feels like family and can't wait to have a scene in The Vic." Kenny, who was also one of the writers, said a character like Fatboy would not have appeared in EastEnders had he not been written by young people. Norwood stated in 2013 that being from east London and playing a character from east London meant that he could "bring the truth to that character from the knowledge I have. [I can] try and bring the truth out of that instead of doing it from an outside perspective."

Although his co-stars Attwater and Kenny were axed from the cast in May 2010, Norwood revealed his contract had been extended to December 2010, saying that the producers saw "some future in Fatboy". In January 2011 it was reported that due to the character's popularity, producers were planning to expand Fatboy's family and were in the process of casting his father, Ashley Chubb. An EastEnders insider is reported to have said "Fatboy has been a real hit with viewers and the bosses have decided that it's now time to bring in his dad so people can see what Fatboy is really all about." Norwood's contract was once again renewed in late 2013 for another year, by the new executive producer Dominic Treadwell-Collins, who promised "juicy storylines" for the character. One source from the programme said "Fatboy is a popular character and appeals to all ages. He's not had a decent storyline for a while but always provides much-needed humour in Albert Square. [...] He’s got some good stuff coming up and is an important member of the cast."

=== Characterisation ===
When the character was announced, he was described as a hustler who sees everything as an opportunity, and has created several personas since the age of seven to hide his real self. Norwood expanded on this, saying "when he was in school and the register was being read out and it got to his name it would be 'Chubb!' and all the kids in school would start taking the mickey out of it. What he did was create something even more ridiculous to take away from that. He took the mickey out of himself and took the power away from those that were taking the mickey out of him. [...] For the same reason most kids put on a front, it's to protect himself from the world. He doesn't like his real name so he tried to create something that would get away from that and Fatboy was that creation. The street and the slang stuff is not something that is far away from him, it is still from the area that he lives in. Fatboy was someone he adopted to put a brave face on, to put a mask on himself, to protect Arthur from the world." Before adopting the "Fatboy" persona, he would adopt personas of men he saw on television, and Norwood said Fatboy was "an awkward kind of child". Fatboy comes from a wealthy background, and gets what he wants from his parents, with whom he has a good relationship, but hustles to hide the fact. He often wears clothing brand Ed Hardy, and his speech has, according to Norwood, a "unique rhythm". Norwood is able to make viable changes to the script to make it sound more authentic.

Norwood said the character's introduction was "trying to bring the street to Albert Square" and that the street slang the character uses is what he grew up with himself. He described the character in an interview with entertainment website Digital Spy as "[wanting] to be a gangsta at times, a caring person, a player, a womaniser, the businessman... There are so many things that he wants to be and that shifts depending on the situation," adding that he is quick to solve problems and always has a plan. Additionally, a profile for the character on the official EastEnders website calls him brash, a wheeler-dealer, confident and a loveable soft-touch.

Norwood said in January 2011 that Fatboy has developed over time and is continuing to develop, with more sides to his personality being shown. Fatboy's caring side is shown in several EastEnders scenes, most notably his friendship with Dot, and a scene where Fatboy and Mercy bring a cake to Kat Moon (Jessie Wallace) after her child dies of cot death. Although Norwood said in January 2011 that Fatboy will always be a joker, he felt it was good to show Fatboy's softer, more intelligent side, saying that the character's "street" side drops quickly when he is around Dot and Mercy. Norwood said that Fatboy wants to improve himself, but fears that showing his caring side in London will get him beaten up.

=== Relationships ===
==== Mercy Olubunmi ====
In April 2011, Mercy faces deportation to Nigeria, and Fatboy plans to save her by proposing. Norwood revealed that Mercy is shocked by the proposal, adding "Mercy thinks he's lost his marbles, but soon comes round to the idea. Fatboy reckons that this isn't about his feelings, it's all about keeping her in the UK. Of course, he's also hoping that if she stays, maybe she'll end up liking him in the way he likes her. [...] You can get into a lot of trouble for [trying to fool immigration officials], [b]ut all Fatboy can think is, 'How can I save Mercy?' She's the girl he loves." Although Fatboy is in love with Mercy, he does not believe that Mercy sees him as more than a friend and may call off the wedding if he tells her. He does not think of the consequences, such as imprisonment. Norwood revealed that Fatboy has known Mercy since they were nine years old and he had feelings for her when EastEnders: E20 started, as he was upset when she got pregnant by someone else. He said that Fatboy would be heartbroken when Mercy leaves. Norwood told Inside Soap that the wedding creates more problems for the characters, rather than solving all their problems. The fact that they try so hard to prove they are genuine makes it "very hard for them to be friends." The wedding episode sees Fatboy have a dream come true, but at the same time it is a nightmare for him. Knowing the wedding is a sham he is "waiting for that monster to appear". Ashley turns up and is annoyed that Fatboy has kept the wedding a secret, and of this, Norwood stated: "When [Ashley] finds out what has happened he is pretty shocked. He tries to make Fatboy see the consequences of his actions, but Fatboy doesn't want to hear it—his dad has already betrayed him when it comes to Mercy." Mercy is shocked to learn that Fatboy did not tell her that Ashley reported her. Although Norwood concluded that Fatboy "will go to the ends of the earth to make this marriage work".

==== Denise Fox ====
In October 2012, it was confirmed by Daniel Kilkelly, a reporter for Digital Spy, that a new storyline would see Denise Fox (Diane Parish) and Fatboy spend the night together after he rescues her when she gets unwanted attention from a man. Norwood, who plays Fatboy, told Inside Soap, "Right now, I don't think Fatboy is looking for love - but he's happy to be swept off his feet by Denise, who's this hot older woman he never imagined he could be with."Denise is a scorching woman - she's got a dynamite body and a beautiful smile. She's way out of his league, but there is a lot of chemistry between them. I think they'd make a really good couple. That would be cool. Fatboy may be young, but he's got an old soul and he's not just some young boy messing about. There is potential there if Denise could see it, but because of the age thing, I think she might worry that people were saying things about her. Right now, she's just enjoying herself." Norwood added that while the pair's relationship was sexual, a serious future for them could be possible.

==== Poppy Meadow ====
In November 2012, Fatboy starts a relationship with his friend Poppy Meadow (Rachel Bright). This was teased by executive producer Lorraine Newman when it was announced Poppy was to become a full-time character. She said, "We'll see Poppy become involved in a relationship very soon, which is progressing very well in the material we're working on at the moment." Digital Spy said of the relationship that "viewers will have to wait and see who she falls for and how things pan out as the new plot develops". It was confirmed that Fatboy would be Poppy's new relationship when they kiss in 22 November's episode. The pair "grow close" after Poppy's sister Tansy Meadow (Daisy Wood-Davis) visits and Fatboy acts as Poppy's "high-flying" businessman boyfriend to help Poppy look good in front of Tansy. Bright said of the relationship: "It's really sweet. I don't think Poppy or Fatboy realised they liked each other as they've been friends for a while. She's unsure at first because she doesn't want to ruin a friendship. She's also been unlucky in love, so she's a little bit wary. But I think she can trust Fatboy. I think the pair of them need love."

In December 2012, it was announced that Fatboy and Poppy would have a BBC Red Button special episode, after Poppy decides to spend Christmas with Fatboy. The story continues on the Red Button. Bright said, "Poppy spends the day with Fatboy. She is under pressure to go back to her family, but realises she doesn't want that. [She] and Fatboy have a romantic day, but you don't see anything on screen [in the Christmas episode] because it is dominated by the Brannings. There will be an interactive section where viewers can press the red button and see a ten-minute film of how Poppy and Fatboy spent their day."

In January 2013, Norwood told Amy Duncan from Metro that the relationship with Poppy was "needed for Fatboy" as he had so far been unlucky in love and "to find somebody that liked him as much as he liked her has been a great boost for him and it's definitely put an extra spring in his step." He noted a comedy aspect of their relationship, calling it "quite sweet" and "funny". He opined that it would be "excellent" if they were to marry, saying their wedding would be "crazy".

=== Departure ===
On 16 October 2015, it was announced Norwood had been axed from EastEnders after nearly six years in the role of Fatboy, after show bosses chose to write the character out. It was revealed that Norwood would be filming his final scenes in the upcoming weeks and producers had chosen to keep details surrounding Fatboy's exit under wraps. A show spokesperson said: "We can confirm that Ricky will be leaving EastEnders. We wish him all the best for the future" whilst a show insider commented: "Ricky is a great guy and very popular on set. He's leaving the show as it's the end of Fatboy's storyline, but everyone wishes him well for the future." Fatboy's last appearance was on 24 December 2015.

On 7 December 2015, the show's executive producer, Dominic Treadwell-Collins, said that "Someone will die on Christmas Day that we haven't revealed to anyone, so that will be a surprise." This turned out to be Fatboy, who died off-screen in a case of mistaken identity prior to the episode broadcast on 26 December 2015. This was not well received by fans, and many set up petitions to bring the character back.

== Storylines ==
Fatboy meets with friend Mercy Olubunmi (Bunmi Mojekwu) to help with a project to encourage more young people to the church. They meet Leon Small (Sam Attwater) and Zsa Zsa Carter (Emer Kenny) and start squatting in a flat. On their last night in the flat, he arranges a party but leaves before the police arrive. Knowing they can no longer stay there, he invites Zsa Zsa, Mercy and Leon to stay at his house in Wanstead, but Mercy goes home to her grandmother. After several weeks, Leon and Fatboy return to Walford to look for Zsa Zsa, who has run away. They eventually settle in and make new friends. Fatboy, Leon, Zsa Zsa, Whitney Dean (Shona McGarty), Lucy Beale (Melissa Suffield) and Lucy's brother Peter Beale (Thomas Law) go to Hampshire and he attends a party with Peter while the others spend time in the woods. He is reunited with Mercy but a fight breaks out, so they escape and drive back to Fatboy's uncle's home. Peter hits something with the van and the next day they fear it was Leon, as he is missing, but he eventually turns up.

During a party at the community centre, Fatboy smuggles in alcohol and kisses Denise Fox (Diane Parish), angering her husband Lucas (Don Gilet), who throws Fatboy out and begins angrily preaching to him. This causes Fatboy to argue with Mercy. During the argument, Mercy pushes him and he falls onto a tree in the Square's gardens planted in memory of Lucas's ex-wife Trina (Sharon Duncan-Brewster), snapping it. Fatboy enlists the help of Mercy, Leon and Zsa Zsa to replace it, but as they dig it up, they uncover a dead body, that of Denise's ex-husband Owen Turner (Lee Ross), who Lucas murdered eight months previously. After he smashes Dot Branning's (June Brown) window, she makes Fatboy fix it. He does a bad job so she insists he pay for a professional, asking Fatboy to wait in her house for the professional to arrive. The two eventually become friends. After Leon and Zsa Zsa move away, he joins the local church choir with Dot.

Fatboy gets a month's trial on the market with his own stall, starting a repair business. He reveals that his father, Ashley Chubb (Colin Mace), has lost his job and his parents have split up. Ashley arrives in Walford, asking for his son's help, as he has spent Fatboy's inheritance on alcohol. Mercy reveals she may face exportation as her visa has expired and Fatboy tells Ashley he is in love with Mercy. Ashley reports Mercy to the UK Border Agency so that Fatboy will forget about her, and she decides to leave before she has been asked to. Fatboy and Mercy say an emotional goodbye, but Fatboy stops her taxi and proposes marriage, realising she can stay in the country if they are married. The pair get married, but Mercy feels guilty about the deception, so decides to go back to Nigeria anyway, and they say an emotional goodbye. Fatboy is distraught over his loss and eventually decides to move in with Dot. Mercy's sister Faith Olubunmi (Modupe Adeyeye) then arrives in Walford to tell Fatboy that Mercy has had their marriage annulled. Fatboy starts a relationship with Faith, but it soon ends.

Fatboy develops feelings for his friend Whitney Dean (Shona McGarty), though Whitney is involved with Tyler Moon (Tony Discipline). When Whitney and Tyler's relationship breaks down, Fatboy admits his feelings for Whitney and the pair start a relationship. Eventually, Whitney admits that she wants Tyler. Fatboy is heartbroken and punches Tyler. When Denise Fox (Diane Parish) gets unwanted attention from a man at a party, Fatboy defends her and they end up having sex. The next morning, an embarrassed Denise tells him it was a mistake, but he cannot stop thinking about her, and eventually plucks up the courage to go to her house, where she is unable to resist him. However, the relationship ends, and Fatboy then starts a relationship with Poppy Meadow (Rachel Bright). Eventually, Fatboy and Poppy both go to lodge with Dot. Fatboy and Poppy's relationship turns sour when Poppy suggests that they should buy a house together. He suggests to Poppy that they rent a flat to begin with and take it from there. However, when Denise feels uncomfortable with the way fiancée Ian Beale (Adam Woodyatt) is treating her, she gets comfort from Fatboy and the pair are unable to resist each other. When Poppy finds out that they shared a kiss, they realise that they are not right for each other and break up.

When Fatboy is told that he is no longer needed to work at The Queen Victoria public house, he accepts a job at Ian's restaurant as a waiter. Denise feels awkward and confesses the truth to Ian, but does not mention Fatboy's name. At The Queen Vic, Fatboy consoles Denise when their kiss during the engagement party is revealed. Fatboy begins running the car lot in Walford. His friendship with Donna Yates (Lisa Hammond) grows and they have a one-night stand, but, feeling it is making their friendship weird, he rejects her afterwards despite her thinking she might have deeper feelings for him. Things between them are awkward, and when Donna's foster brother Vincent Hubbard (Richard Blackwood) finds out, he confronts Fatboy and locks him in a cupboard. He returns the next day to find that Fatboy has not been discovered, and from how scared Fatboy is, realises something is wrong. Fatboy opens up about the fact his mother used to lock him up for extended periods of time, which led to him assuming the comedic persona of "Fatboy". Vincent convinces him to use his real name, Arthur, again, and gives him a job as DJ at his bar, The Albert, as long as he no longer puts on a false persona, starting with admitting to Donna that he will now be showing his true self to her.

Fatboy gets tangled in Vincent's vendetta against the Mitchell family and trying to kill Phil Mitchell (Steve McFadden). Fatboy repeatedly tries to convince Vincent to stop, and interrupts Vincent when as he is about to throttle Phil. Fed up with his interference, Vincent threatens Fatboy with violence against Dot if he does not leave Walford forever. Fatboy tells Dot that he is going to see his father for Christmas and shares a final dinner with her before saying goodbye. He confronts Vincent one last time, demanding that he stay away from Dot, and leaves Walford. The next day, Vincent discovers that Ronnie Mitchell (Samantha Womack) planned to have him killed and crushed in a car, but asked for the car's driver to be killed, assuming it would be Vincent. Fearing that his mother Claudette Hubbard (Ellen Thomas) has been kidnapped and could possibly be killed, Vincent rushes to the scrapyard to rescue her, only to find Fatboy's phone and necklace amongst some blood in the boot of the crushed car. Distraught about Fatboy's apparent death, Vincent tells Ronnie the car was empty and urges Claudette to end their feud with the Mitchells as it has caused Fatboy's death. Weeks later, Vincent confronts Claudette, who admits she knew that he would be killed if he was driving, so sent Fatboy instead. Ronnie never becomes aware that she caused Fatboy's death.

When Vincent discovers that Claudette killed his father Henry, he nearly strangles her to death for this and for Fatboy's death but is stopped by Patrick Trueman (Rudolph Walker), after which she falls down the stairs during a scuffle with Patrick. Vincent buries her in his basement afterwards, but Claudette escapes and tells Donna that Vincent tried to kill her. Vincent says Claudette killed her husband, Henry, but Donna does not believe him, so he reveals that Claudette had indirectly killed Fatboy. Donna tells Vincent and Claudette to leave, but Patrick arrives and confirms that Vincent is telling the truth about Henry. When Donna accuses Claudette of only fostering her to ease her guilt, Vincent tells Claudette to leave Walford, and gives Donna Fatboy's necklace to remember him by.

In December 2022, after Dot dies, a condolence card is sent to Dot's house, reading "Mrs B – Forever in my heart. Arthur x", hinting that Fatboy may have survived his apparent "death". In 2023, Fatboy is seen in a flashback to the night of Lucy Beale's (Hetti Bywater) murder in 2014, where he unknowingly crosses paths with Lucy’s mother, Cindy Beale (Michelle Collins), who was believed to be dead.

== Other appearances ==
Fatboy appears in extra content on the official EastEnders: E20 website. In one video, Fatboy gives his top ten tips for surviving life in Albert Square. Another features him recording a video on his mobile phone for Mercy, in which he admits he once thought he would end up in a romantic relationship with her. In other videos, he is filmed on a webcam singing along to the Destiny's Child hit "Bootylicious" and catches Leon posing, threatening to post the video on the Internet. In August 2010, an official account on the social networking site Twitter was created for Fatboy, along with three characters from series 2 of EastEnders: E20. Posts on Twitter revealed Fatboy has sold a fake ID to Naz Mehmet (Emaa Hussen) but the photo looked nothing like her and the age was wrong.

Fatboy makes cameo appearances in series 2 of E20, where his argument with Naz continues in episode 1, and she steals back her money. Fatboy attends a dance audition, and witnesses Asher Levi (Heshima Thompson) bribing Skolla (Tony Adigun) to let Asher's brother Sol (Tosin Cole) through even though he failed his audition. Asher threatens Fatboy with a knife, telling him that he saw nothing. In episode 5 Fatboy attends callbacks for the dance group, and in episode 7, he dances with the group again and helps break up a fight between Asher and Sol. In episode 10, Fatboy attends the dance-off between Skolla's crew and Flawless. He also appears in series 3. In episode 1, when Faith Olubunmi is homeless, she asks Fatboy if she can stay with him but he refuses.

Fatboy also appears in "East Street", a charity crossover episode between EastEnders and Coronation Street, broadcast on 19 November 2010 as part of the BBC One telethon for the children's charity Children in Need. In the non-canon episode, Fatboy is in Walford's café while Denise Johnson and Gail McIntyre (Helen Worth) from Coronation Street argue over their similar storylines. Fatboy says Gail is the winner after saying she has been in prison. He also appears in scenes in The Queen Victoria.

In "All I Want for Christmas", a mini-episode shown on the BBC Red Button service on 27 December 2012, Fatboy appears with his girlfriend Poppy, in which they are shown getting drunk on Christmas Eve, and having dinner on Christmas Day. Poppy is sick with food poisoning the next day, so Fatboy leaves her to look after herself. The next she is well again and Fatboy makes it clear that he wants sex with Poppy, as it would be their first time together. Poppy decides to spend the rest of Christmas with her family, and while she is gone, Fatboy buys food and gifts, but gives them to a homeless man who tells him Christmas is about love, not material things. As Poppy is about to leave with her sister Tansy Meadow (Daisy Wood-Davis), Fatboy stops the car. He later tells her he wants to wait to have sex with her and says he loves her, and she says it back to him.

Fatboy also appears in the third episode of the online spin-off Tamwar Tales – The Life of an Assistant Market Inspector, titled "Fatboy", which was first shown on 8 August 2013. In the episode, Tamwar Masood (Himesh Patel) tries to get Fatboy to turn his music down but they end up doing the Harlem Shake. Their full Harlem Shake dance was also posted online separately, prior to the spin-off.

== Reception ==
In April 2010, six main characters were axed from EastEnders by executive producer Bryan Kirkwood. Fatboy was not one of them, but Stuart Heritage from The Guardian felt that he should have been, calling him "A wodge of irritating comic relief [...] who is yet to serve a purpose other than making me genuinely dislike young people. [...] He must go, preferably in a scene where he falls down the world's largest flight of stairs." Heritage later called Fatboy an "obnoxiously two-dimensional dubstep-fixated stock [character] transparently modelled on Jar Jar Binks." A writer for the website Watch With Mothers called the character an asset to EastEnders, expressing pleasure that the show was trying to appeal to younger viewers, while another called him irritating and zany. A writer for The Northern Echo wondered if Fatboy, along with Leon and Zsa Zsa, brought a new injection of life into the soap or took away screen time from more established characters. Grace Dent from The Guardian changed her opinion of Fatboy over time, saying:

Fatboy has won my heart. What began as horrified staring at this huge, bug-eyed child in a fluoro Ed Hardy hoodie, the Venn diagram meeting point of Jar Jar Binks and Dappy from N-Dubz, has now shifted to deep love. I love Fatboy's "wheels", ie a retired, graffiti-splattered ice-cream van. I love his simple approach to life: making money, "checkin out batty", eating jollof rice. Get rich or die trying (though by "die", I really mean "get sulked at by Dot Branning and refused a last-minute service wash"). I love how much Fatboy infuriates old-fart viewers with the uncomfortable truth that he's actually quite authentic. [...] Without Fatboy, EastEnders right now is a wholly compelling, yet dark place.

Julie Emery from Heat criticised Fatboy's fashion sense, especially from the episode broadcast on 12 May 2011, saying "We know clashing prints are soooooo this season, but really, Fatboy, they do nothing for you. And while we're at it, stop wearing that tinny 'F' round your neck, for flip's sake. You're not a gangster rapper, and anyway your real name's Arthur." Emery also said the storyline where Fatboy asks Mercy to marry him so she can stay in the country sounded "somewhat familiar", as Coronation Street was featuring a similar storyline at the same time. Amy Duncan from the Metro said Fatboy was one of her favourite young characters in EastEnders and said that, with Poppy, he "bring[s] some much-needed light into the soap". Vicky Prior from the Metro said that Fatboy "is easily one of the best characters in EastEnders, able to interact seamlessly with other characters, both young and old."

Norwood has received four award nominations for his portrayal of Fatboy. In May 2010, he received a nomination in the "Best Soap Newcomer" category at the 14th TVChoice Awards, and in July he was nominated for "Best Newcomer" at the 2010 Inside Soap Awards, which he went on to win in September. In September 2010, he was nominated in the newcomer category of the 16th National Television Awards, which he won in January 2011. In May 2011, he was nominated for "Best Newcomer" at the 2011 British Soap Awards.

Following the character's death, "#Fatboy" trended on social network Twitter; a petition was set up online asking for Treadwell-Collins to revive the character; as of 30 December 2015, the petition received 2,780 signatures.

== See also ==
- List of EastEnders: E20 characters
