= The Richard Blackwood Show =

- Genre: Comedy; Talk show
- Presented by: Richard Blackwood
- Country of origin: United Kingdom
- No. of episodes: 23

Production
- Running time: 30 minutes

Original release
- Network: Channel 4
- Release: 22 September 1999 – March 2001

The Richard Blackwood Show is a UK television series starring comedian Richard Blackwood. The show was broadcast from 1999 to 2001 on Channel 4. It included features such as interviews, pranks and stand-up comedy routines. There were noticeable changes as the series progressed. The show was cancelled after one series.

== Production ==
Unlike many other talk shows, The Richard Blackwood Show did not air in series/seasons and was instead aired all year long without any seasonal breaks, and twenty-three episodes of the show were aired.

== Casting ==
The show was presented by comedian, rapper and actor Richard Blackwood.

=== Guests ===
The guests on the initial 5 episodes were TQ, Melanie B (or Mel G as she was known at the time of the recording), LFO, LL Cool J, Will Smith and Don King.
