= Ellen Thomas (actress) =

Sierra Leonean actress (born 1964)

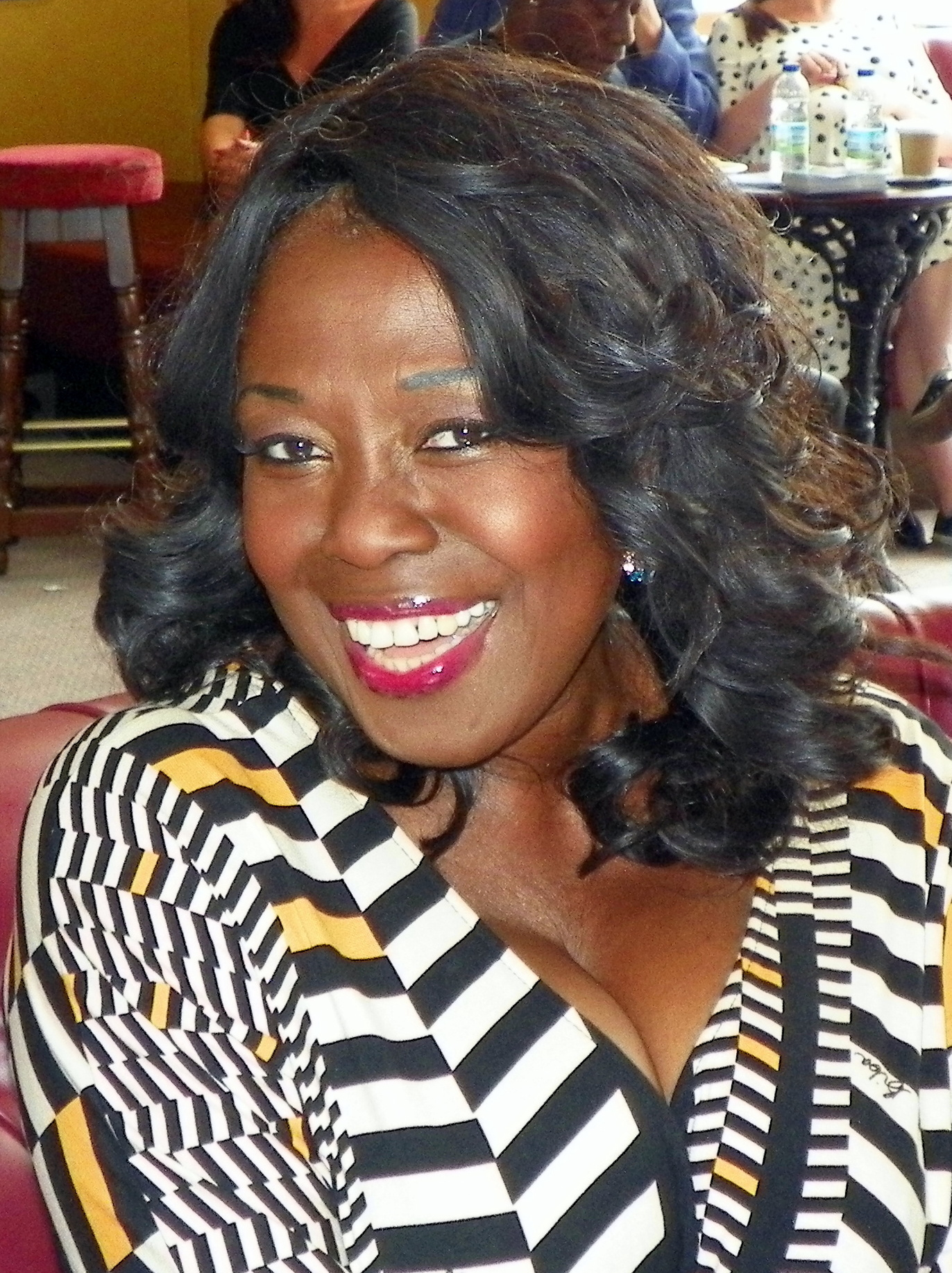
- Thomas in 2016
- Born: 3 February 1954 (age 72); Sierra Leone
- Occupation: Actress
- Years active: 1980–present
- Known for: Teachers; EastEnders; Mount Pleasant

Ellen Thomas (born 3 February 1954) is a Sierra Leonean actress, known for her roles as Liz Webbe in the Channel 4 sitcom Teachers and Claudette Hubbard in the BBC soap opera EastEnders. She is also known for her recent voice role in the Netflix animated show Arcane as Noxian warlord, Ambessa Medarda.

== Career ==
In Teachers, Thomas played Liz Webbe, a school secretary, and appeared in all four series, from 2001 to 2004. She was a regular cast member in BBC Radio 4's Clare in the Community and in BBC Three's Coming of Age, in which she portrayed the principal. For her role in Rev, she was nominated for "Best TV Comedy Performance" at the Black International Film Festival and Music Video & Screen Awards. In 2010, she had a minor role in Come Fly with Me, as Mrs Mbutu.

Thomas is known for the number of characters she has portrayed in the BBC soap opera EastEnders. She initially played Pearl Chadwick in 1990, Estella Hulton in 2002, Grace Olubunmi from 2010 to 2011, and most notably Claudette Hubbard from 2015 to 2016. From 2018 to 2019, Thomas appeared in the medical drama by the BBC Casualty, in the recurring role of Omo Masters. In 2020, she appeared in an episode of Death in Paradise. In 2021 she appeared in the first season of Netflix's Arcane, voicing Ambessa Medarda and reprised the role for season 2 in 2024. In 2023, she appeared in The Madame Blanc Mysteries. In 2024, she appeared in two episodes of the BBC crime drama Silent Witness.

On stage, Thomas made her debut in July 1981, in London, playing Madam Irma in the ground breaking multi-racial performance of Jean Genet's revolutionary The Balcony, presented by Internationalist Theatre She also played the role of Enid Matthews in Leave Taking at its debut at the Liverpool Playhouse in 1987 and in a run at the Lyric, Hammersmith in 1990.

== Filmography ==
Television roles
Year	Title	Role	Notes
1980	The Gentle Touch	Laura	Series 5, Episode 4
1981	Sunday Night Thriller	Assistant	1 episode
1982	O.T.T.	Herself, various	12 episodes
1983	Don't Wait Up	Receptionist	Series 1, Episode 5
1984	Shroud for a Nightingale	Staff Nurse	3 episodes
1987	The Lenny Henry Show	Rose	Series 1, Episode 1–6
1988	French and Saunders	Various characters	Christmas special
1988	The Lenny Henry Show	Rose	Series 2, Episode 1–6
1989	CBS Summer Playhouse	Mrs. Holmes	Series 3, Episode 10 "Outpost"
1990	Hallelujah Anyhow	Unnamed Character	
1990	EastEnders	Pearl Chadwick	3 episodes
1991	Grange Hill	Pregnancy Advisor	Series 14, Episode 14
1993	Screenplay	Aunt Mafe	1 episode
1994–1996	Cardiac Arrest	Sister Jackie Landers	14 episodes
1994	The Bill	Iris Davareux	"Lesson to Be Learned"
1994	Home Away from Home	Miriam	
1995	London Bridge	Diane Symmons	Series 2, Episode 1–2
1996	The Ruth Rendell Mysteries	Laurette Akande	3 episodes
1997	Holding On	Florrie	Series 1 Episode 1–8
1997	Kavanagh QC	Chief Usher	Series 3, Episode 1 "Mute of Malice"
1998	Ultraviolet	Maria	Series 1, Episode 5 "Terra Incognita"
2000	The Bill	Mrs. Okin	"White Lies"
2000	In Defence	Mrs. Hope	Series 1, Episode 1
2000	Where There's Smoke	Counsellor Edwards	
2000	Never Never	Brenda	Short drama
2001–2004	Teachers	Liz Webb	Series 1–4 (39 episodes)
2002	Doctors	Mrs. Foster	1 episode
2002	The Bill	Aisha Danvers	
2002	Holby City	Marcia Lyme	1 episode
2002	The Jury	Ruby Thomas	Series 1, Episode 1–4
2002	EastEnders	Estella Hulton	1 episode
2003	Strange	Mrs. Andoh	Series 1, Episode 2 "Kaa-Jinn"
2003	Lenny Henry in Pieces	Unnamed Character	Series 2, Episode 2
2003	Good Food Live	Herself	1 episode
2005	Casualty	Stephanie Mellor	Episode: "Aftermath"
2005	William and Mary	Mrs. Morris	Series 3, Episode 2
2006	Doctor Who	Clockwork Woman	Series 2, Episode 4 "The Girl in the Fireplace"
2006	Little Miss Jocelyn	Unnamed Character	Series 1, Episode 1 and 3
2006	Trial & Retribution	Judge Joyce Addo	"Sins Of The Father"
2006	Doctors	Marie Crossley	Series 7, Episode 140 "Ashes to Ashes"
2006	The Play's the Thing	Herself	Series 1, Episode 2
2007	Outnumbered	Jehovah's Witness	Series 1, Episode 4
2007	One of Us?	Mum	Short film
2008	Coming of Age	The Principal	All episodes since series 1, episode 3
2008	New Tricks	Cora Trimble	Series 5, Episode 8 "Mad Dogs"
2009	Off the Hook	Angela	Series 1, Episode 1
2009	Doctor Who	Carmen	Easter 2009 special; "Planet of the Dead"
2009	Moses Jones	Libby Jones	Series 1, Episodes 2 and 3
2010–2011	EastEnders	Grace Olubunmi	Recurring role
2010-2014	Rev.	Adoha Onyeka	All episodes
2011	Come Fly with Me	Mrs. Mbutu	Episode 2
2011	EastEnders: E20	Grace Olubunmi	
2012	Doctors	Mrs Francelle Ndebele	"Paradise Lost"
2012	Casualty	Florence Asike	2 episodes
2015–2016	EastEnders	Claudette Hubbard	Regular role
2015	Humans	Lindsey Kiwanuka	Episode 1–2
2015–2017	Mount Pleasant	Nana Miller	Regular role
2016	New Blood	Joan Philips	Episode 1
2018–2019	Casualty	Omo Masters	Recurring role
2018–2019	In the Long Run	Mama	5 episodes (voice role), 2 episodes
2018	Midsomer Murders	Ruth Crane	1 episode
2018	The Queen and I	Philomena Troussaint	Television film
2019	Doctors	Liz Maberry	1 episode
2019	Dark Money	Maggie Mensah	Main role
2020	Death in Paradise	Georgine Perault	Series 9, Episode 7
2021–2024	Arcane	Ambessa Medarda	Voice, 9 episodes
2022	A Birthday Party	Aunty Fatou	Short film
2022	Say Nothing	Ms Araali Mabele	Short film
2022	Murder, They Hope	Nanny	Episode: "A Midsummer Night's Scream"
2022	A Birthday Party	Aunty Fatou	Short film
2023	Such A Lovely Day	Claude	Short film
2024	The Madame Blanc Mysteries	Reme Benson	Episode: "Kidnap"
2024	Silent Witness	Esther Daniels	2 episodes
2024	The Cleaner	Jennifer	Episode: "The Committee"
2026	Dragon Striker	Nurse Volgora	Voice, 2 episodes
TBA	Finding Forever		

Film roles
Year	Title	Role
2001	South West 9	Mrs. Ashware
2001	Buried Treasure	Martha
2002	Jeffrey Archer: The Truth	First Judge
2006	Basic Instinct 2	Prosecutor
2006	Losing It	Paula
2006	Breaking and Entering	Judge
2008	Clubbed	Mrs. Smith
2010	The Future Wags of Great Britain	Auntie Deborah
2010	The Santa Trap	Tooth Fairy
2011	Johnny English Reborn	Colin Tucker's mother
2016	Golden Years	Thelma
2022	Mrs. Harris Goes to Paris	Vi Butterfield
2022	The Pay Day	Ms Boomer

== Audiobooks ==
- 2025: C. L. Clark: Ambessa: Chosen of the Wolf. A League of Legends: Arcane Novel, Little, Brown Audio

== Awards and nominations ==
Year	Award	Category	Result	Ref.
2016	The British Soap Awards	Villain of the Year	Nominated	
2016	Inside Soap Awards	Best Bad Girl	Longlisted	
