= Richard Blackwood =

English actor

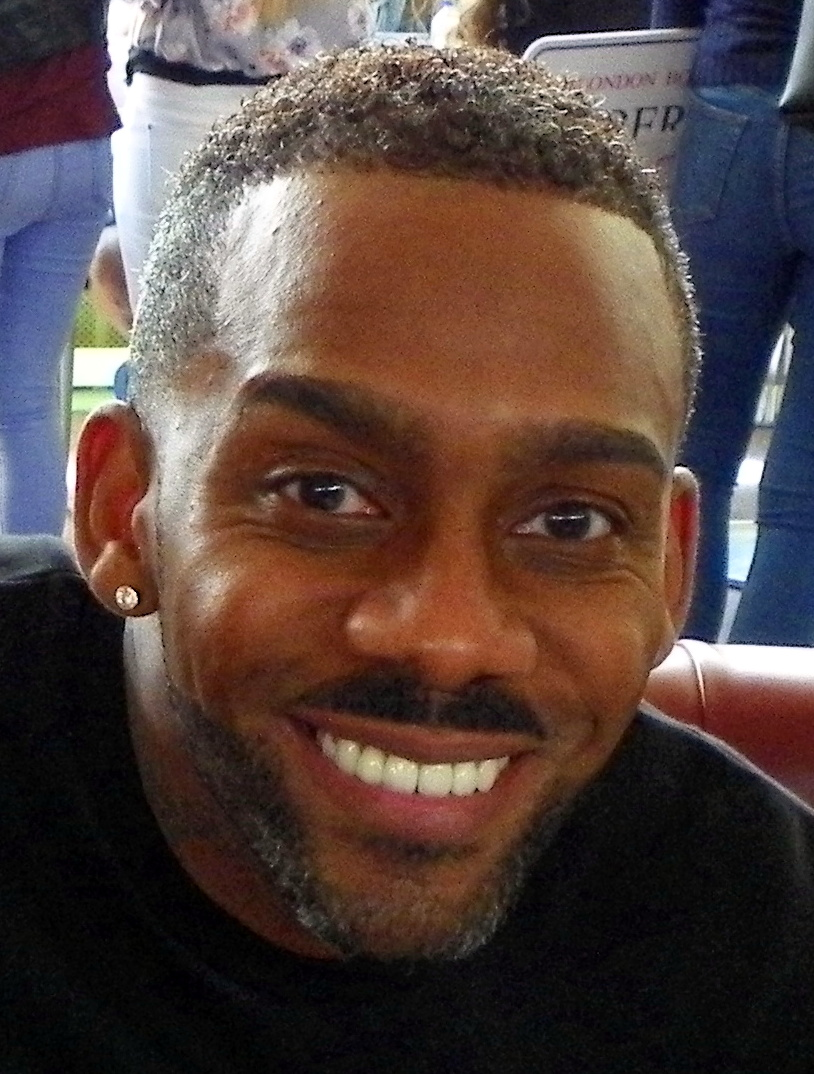
- Blackwood in 2016
- Born: Richard Clifford Blackwood; 15 May 1972 (age 54); Clapham, London, England
- Children: One
- Relatives: Junior Giscombe (uncle); Vas Blackwood (cousin)

Comedy career
- Years active: 1993–present
- Medium: Comedian; actor; presenter; rapper

Richard Clifford Blackwood (born 15 May 1972) is a British comedian, actor, presenter, and rapper. From 2015 to 2018 he played Vincent Hubbard in the BBC soap opera EastEnders. In 2020 he began playing Felix Westwood in the Channel 4 soap opera Hollyoaks. For his role as Felix, he was nominated for a TRIC Award and a National Television Award.

== Career ==
Blackwood began his career in stand-up comedy in the early 1990s, performing at venues including The Spot in Covent Garden, where he made his debut in 1993. He quickly gained recognition on the UK comedy circuit for his energetic style and natural stage presence, touring nationally and establishing himself as a rising performer before transitioning into television presenting. He continues to perform stand-up comedy regularly.

Blackwood presented the UK version of Singled Out on Channel 5, and in 1999, he presented his own series, titled The Richard Blackwood Show. He was also a presenter on Top of the Pops and the MTV television show, MTV Select with Donna Air. In 2000, Blackwood had a number three single on the UK Singles Chart with the song "Mama Who Da Man", based on "Mama Used to Say" by his uncle Junior Giscombe. He later followed it up with two singles, "1.2.3.4 Get with the Wicked" (number 10) and "Someone There for Me" (number 23) and released the album You'll Love to Hate This (number 35) in 2000.

Blackwood was tricked into being interviewed on the satire comedy series Brass Eye in 2001, during the episode "Paedogeddon". Blackwood then had acting appearances in Holby City, and played the title character in the 2002 television series Ed Stone Is Dead. During May 2003, Blackwood appeared in Channel 5's Celebrity Detox Camp, which involved him being filmed "pumping 18 litres of coffee solution through his anus into [his] stomach". In March 2007, he acted in the Bollywood film Don't Stop Dreaming. In 2005, Blackwood appeared in Princes of Comedii DVD release. In 2010, he played Brightie in the Tennessee Williams play Cat on a Hot Tin Roof, alongside Adrian Lester and James Earl Jones at the Novello Theatre in London. In 2011, he played the role of Donkey in the West End production of Shrek the Musical. The show opened at the Theatre Royal Drury Lane on 14 June 2011. Blackwood appeared with the rest of the Shrek cast on Britain's Got Talent for ITV on 31 May 2011. They performed "I'm a Believer".

On 17 January 2015, it was announced that Blackwood would be joining the cast of EastEnders as character Vincent Hubbard. He made his first appearance on 17 February 2015, and his last appearance aired on 20 April 2018. In 2019, Blackwood took part in the eleventh series of Dancing on Ice, partnered with professional skater Carlotta Edwards. They were eliminated in Week 3, following a skate off against Saira Khan and Mark Hanretty. In 2020, it was announced that he would be joining the cast of the Channel 4 soap opera Hollyoaks. Since joining Hollyoaks, Blackwood has been nominated for a TRIC Award for Soap Actor of the Year, as well as a National Television Award for Serial Drama Performance.

It was announced on 19 September 2026, that Richard would star as Long John Silver in the 2026/27 pantomime Treasure Island at the Wolverhampton Grand Theatre.

In October 2026, Blackwood presented the National Curry Week Cook-Off alongside Tommy Sandhu.

== Personal life ==
In a 2000 interview, Blackwood claimed that if he had not made it in show business he would have been "a graphic designer, designing buildings". He became the stepbrother of supermodel Naomi Campbell when his father married her mother in the 1980s, until their divorce several years later. His uncle is singer Junior Giscombe and his cousin is the actor and comedian Vas Blackwood.

Blackwood has said he once attempted suicide after filing for bankruptcy in 2003. He has a son, Keaun, born in January 2001.

== Discography ==
=== Studio album ===
Title	Details	Peak chart positions
Title	Details	UK
You'll Love to Hate This	Released: 11 September 2000; Label: Warner	35

=== Singles ===
Title	Year	Peak chart positions	Album
Title	Year	UK	Album
"Mama Who Da Man"	2000	3	You'll Love to Hate This
"1.2.3.4 Get with the Wicked"	2000	10	You'll Love to Hate This
"Someone There for Me"	2000	23	You'll Love to Hate This

== Awards and nominations ==
Year	Award	Category	Work	Result	Ref.
2015	TV Choice Awards	Best Soap Newcomer	EastEnders	Nominated	
2015	Inside Soap Awards	Best Newcomer	EastEnders	Shortlisted	
2016	21st National Television Awards	Newcomer	EastEnders	Nominated	
2017	Inside Soap Awards	Funniest Male	EastEnders	Nominated	
2018	British Soap Awards	Best Actor	EastEnders	Nominated	
2021	26th National Television Awards	Serial Drama Performance	Hollyoaks	Nominated	
2021	Inside Soap Awards	Best Actor	Hollyoaks	Nominated	
2021	Inside Soap Awards	Best Partnership (shared with Kéllé Bryan)	Hollyoaks	Nominated	
2022	27th National Television Awards	Serial Drama Performance	Hollyoaks	Nominated	
2022	Inside Soap Awards	Best Actor	Hollyoaks	Nominated	
2023	British Soap Awards	Best Leading Performer	Hollyoaks	Nominated	
2023	British Soap Awards	Best On-Screen Partnership (shared with Jamie Lomas)	Hollyoaks	Nominated	
2023	National Film Awards UK	Best Actor in a TV Series	Hollyoaks	Won	
