= Gavin Sullivan =

Fictional character from the BBC soap opera EastEnders

- EastEnders character
- Portrayed by: Paul Nicholas
- Duration: 2015–2016
- First appearance: Episode 5124; 21 August 2015
- Last appearance: Episode 5312; 8 July 2016
- Introduced by: Dominic Treadwell-Collins
In-universe information
- Mother: Ivy Sullivan
- Sisters: Margaret Midhurst; Sally
- Wife: Kathy Beale (2001–2016)
- Sons: Zack Hudson
- Daughters: Sharon Watts
- Stepsons: Ian Beale; Ben Mitchell
- Grandsons: Dennis Rickman Jnr; Albie Watts; Barney Mitchell
- Granddaughters: Dolly Dean-Hudson
- Other relatives: Alyssa Lennox

Gavin Sullivan is a fictional character from the BBC soap opera EastEnders, played by Paul Nicholas. He first appeared on 21 August 2015. Gavin is the third husband of Kathy Beale (Gillian Taylforth) and is also revealed as the biological father of Sharon Watts (Letitia Dean). He is first mentioned as Sharon's father in 1990 and as Kathy's husband in 2001, but does not appear on screen until 2015 and it is not known that Sharon's father and Kathy's husband are the same Gavin until October 2015. Viewers are informed in a 2006 episode that Kathy and Gavin are dead, but Kathy returns in February 2015, revealing that Gavin is also alive. Billed as "an EastEnders villain like no other", Gavin has been described as "dangerous", "sinister", "nasty" and "evil". His storylines include his "abusive", "controlling" and "manipulative" relationship with Kathy, kidnapping recovering alcoholic Phil Mitchell (Steve McFadden) and getting him drinking again, and blackmailing Claudette Hubbard (Ellen Thomas). His departure involves kidnapping Kathy, causing the death of his sister Margaret Midhurst (Jan Harvey) and being arrested after threatening to kill himself and Sharon. He appeared in 30 episodes, and his final appearance is on 8 July 2016. In January 2021, Gavin was killed-off off-screen.

== Development ==
=== Introduction ===
After it was confirmed that Taylforth was returning to EastEnders, executive producer, Dominic Treadwell-Collins teased about Gavin in May 2015 when he said of Kathy's return: "It's a big, big story with lots of twists and turns. We know that there was a man named Gavin, who Kathy went off with to South Africa. So there's Gavin, Kathy—and lots of Phil [Mitchell] involved." Then, on 17 June, Treadwell-Collins posted on Twitter a photo of part of a script, featuring Gavin, and the caption "He's on his way...". The following day, 18 June, Paul Nicholas's casting in the role was announced, and it was confirmed that the character would play a major part in Kathy's return storyline. Nicholas said of his role: "I am delighted to be joining the wonderful cast of EastEnders for what is going to be an exciting time ahead. I can't wait to get started and seeing what's in store for my character." Executive producer Dominic Treadwell-Collins said: "We are all thrilled that Paul has agreed to join our cast to play Gavin. So many British television viewers have grown up with Paul Nicholas so it's brilliant to have him back on our screens, playing a major part in Kathy's explosive return to the Square, while also holding the key to many more of the Square's secrets." Nicholas later said it was "great" for him to join a "brilliantly produced and very well acted" show, but said it was "quite daunting" as he had not acted in a soap opera before. He said that when he joined the cast, he met the writers who explained the character to him and gave him a "really good insight into where they wanted it to go" and added, "It is nice to be involved in something so successful and that people actually watch." Two days after Nicholas's casting was announced, Nicholas and Taylforth were seen filming on location at King's Cross station, for Gavin's introduction scene that aired on 21 August 2015, and on 30 June, on-location photos emerged of Nicholas, Taylforth, Steve McFadden (Phil Mitchell) and Samantha Womack (Ronnie Mitchell), filming at an airfield in Essex, for Gavin's third episode, broadcast on 11 September 2015.

=== Villainy ===
During an EastEnders press event, Treadwell-Collins stated that it was hoped Gavin would be "an EastEnders villain like no other", and described him as "modern, complex and he will have a little foot in the past and a foot in the present." Treadwell-Collins later said, "Paul Nicholas has created the most manipulative and dangerous EastEnders villain we've ever had. He makes Archie Mitchell look like a Care Bear." Discussing this comparison, Rachel McGrath of The Huffington Post UK said, "He makes the murderous, abusive, rapist Archie look like a child's cuddly toy. We're genuinely terrified." Vicky Prior from the Metro called Treadwell-Collins' claim "bold [...] for a show that has produced some of TV's most iconic villains", and included in her list Nick Cotton (John Altman), Archie (Larry Lamb), Lucas Johnson (Don Gilet), Trevor Morgan (Alex Ferns), Phil Mitchell, Grant Mitchell (Ross Kemp), Vincent Hubbard (Richard Blackwood), Janine Butcher (Charlie Brooks), Chrissie Watts (Tracy-Ann Oberman), Ronnie Mitchell, Michael Moon (Steve John Shepherd), Yusef Khan (Ace Bhatti) and Babe Smith (Annette Badland), saying that "I don't think Gavin will find it easy to earn a place in Walford's Rogues Gallery. I expect EastEnders to have some extra dramatic plots coming up to help Gavin out though." Digital Spy's Daniel Kilkelly said that the script snippet posted online by Treadwell-Collins "hinted that the character will be a formidable force".

Nicholas said about Gavin: "I wouldn't say he was the most charming man I've ever played." However, Taylforth said that he is a "charming character, who can turn menacing, dark and deep", and called him "horrible". Taylforth also said that Gavin is "very cunning" and "knows everyone's weakness and uses it", and called him a "tyrant". Harry Reid, who plays Kathy and Phil's son Ben Mitchell, called Gavin "a nasty bloke with an edge to him." Additionally, Danny Walker from the Daily Mirror called him "moody", James Leyfield from the Daily Mirror called him an "east end bad boy", Nigel Pauley from the Daily Mirror called him a "psycho gangster", and Inside Soap called Gavin "wicked" and "Walford's new baddy", with Kate White from the magazine calling him "sinister". Amy Duncan from the Metro called him "calculated", Duncan Lindsay from the Metro called him "scheming", and Soaplife called him "mysterious", "slippery", "grim", and a "ruthless operator". What's on TV described him as a "vicious gangster", "threatening" and "dodgy", and All About Soap called him "evil". A show insider told Inside Soap that Gavin is "a nasty piece of work". Nicholas later said that the fact that Gavin comes in and out of the show "makes him more unpredictable, I think. Unpredictable villains are the best."

=== Relationship with Kathy ===
Speaking of Gavin and Kathy's relationship, Taylforth said that he is so manipulative towards her that "She can't function without [him]" and she has "been brainwashed". She said that Gavin has "a hold on her" and has "knocked her down so much" and explained that he has convinced her she is a bad mother, adding "she's really frightened of him". She claimed that Kathy loves Gavin and "he convinces her that he loves her, too" and makes her believe that everything is her fault. She also said that Gavin has reasons for controlling everything Kathy does and has "little ways of getting round her." Kate White from Inside Soap said, "Kathy is fighting for survival and knows how twisted Gavin is." Inside Soap said the script snippet "seems to indicate that Gavin is one step ahead of his wife", saying that the reason Kathy always seems to look nervous is because of Gavin. Inside Soap also said that Kathy is scared because of "her marriage to the dangerous Gavin Sullivan". David Brown from Radio Times said Gavin and Kathy have a "poisonous marriage", and a show insider told Inside Soap that Gavin and Kathy's marriage was "built on mind games and his twisted ability to control her." Soaplife said that "Kathy will testify [that] he's not the sort of [man] to take rejection lying down."

=== Phil Mitchell ===
In relation to Gavin's first scenes with Kathy's former husband Phil, it was said that Gavin "will not be taking no for an answer" and he "doesn't take things quietly", with Treadwell-Collins calling the storyline "a really exciting thriller". Further scenes between Phil and Gavin prompted Daniel Kilkelly from Digital Spy to think that Phil "may have met his match". A show insider told Inside Soap, "He's not afraid to get his hands dirty, even [if] it means butting heads with the notorious Mitchell family. Phil should watch out—this one's a real handful!" On the storyline where Gavin has Phil kidnapped and demands money to spare his life, an EastEnders insider told Inside Soap, "Gavin knows which buttons to push to frighten Kathy into doing exactly what he wants. He wants that money, he wants her by his side, and if things don't go as he wants, Phil is going to pay a high price." Treadwell-Collins said of the kidnap storyline: "What Gavin does to Phil while he's off screen will take Phil in a whole new direction that will run into next year [2016]." Taylforth confirmed that what Gavin does to Phil is the reason Phil starts drinking again, saying "Gavin knows that drinking is Phil's weakness". This has an ongoing impact on Phil and the Mitchells, with Treadwell-Collins calling Phil "a broken man" and confirming it was the start of a storyline that would continue until Easter 2016.

=== Ben Mitchell ===
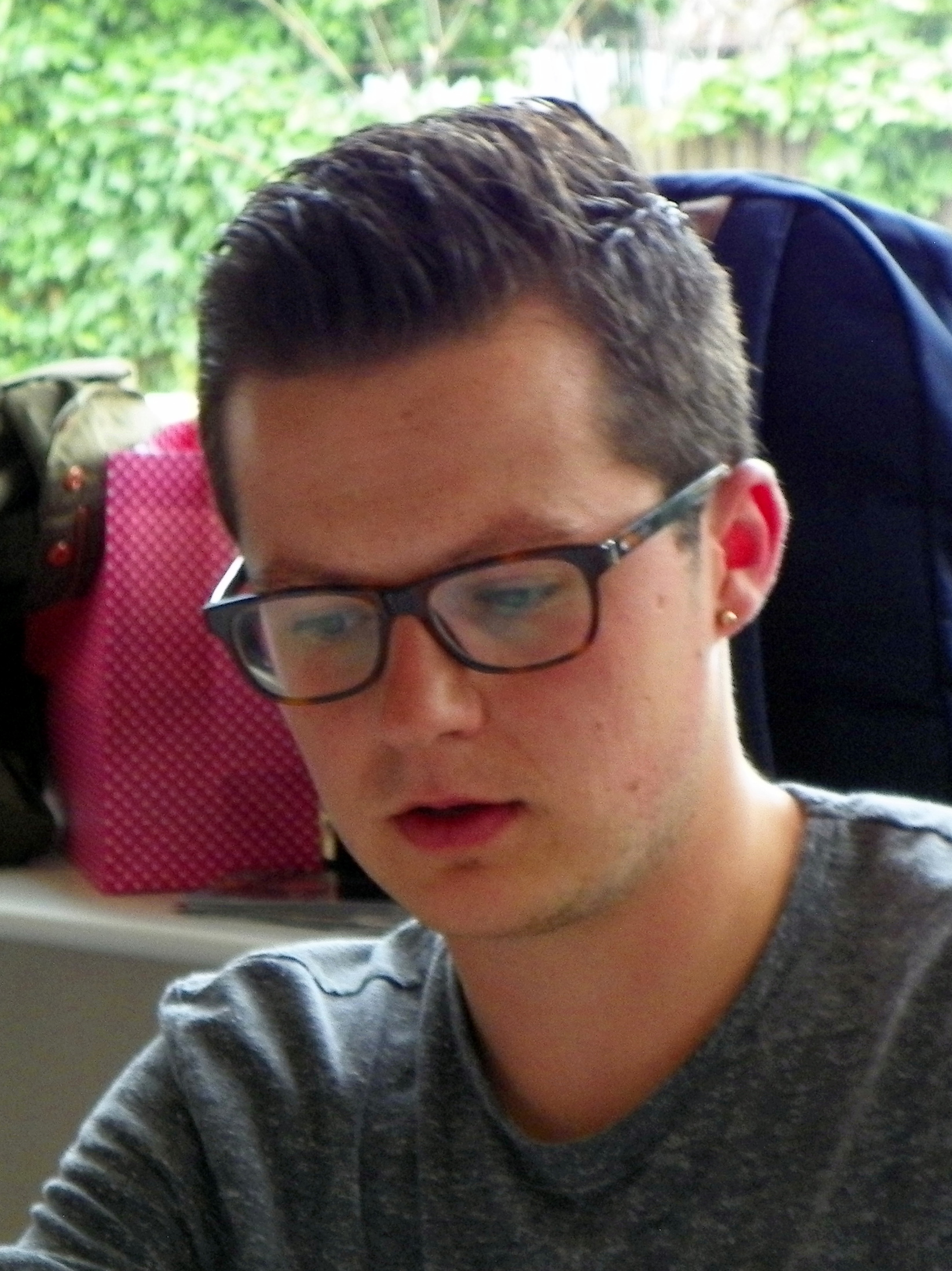
The relationship between Gavin and his stepson Ben (played by actor Harry Reid, pictured) was described as "an interesting dynamic".

Ben actor Reid spoke of his character's relationship with Gavin, saying that Gavin was a father figure to Ben for several years, adding, "He grew up with him and there will be a lot of love there. Ben came back [from South Africa, after Kathy and Gavin faked their deaths] a happy child, so you think Gavin is a perfect dad as he helped create that kid. There's a real connection there between them, having spent time together and loved each other." Reid also said that Gavin "clearly didn't do a bad job" of raising Ben, Ben does not blame Gavin for being lied to about Kathy and Gavin's fake deaths, and Ben finds Gavin more understanding than his own father. However, he said that Ben knows Gavin has a "nasty edge". Treadwell-Collins promised "an interesting dynamic" between Ben and Gavin, saying that Gavin would "manipulate Ben as well as Kathy".

=== Paternity of Sharon Watts ===
Several news outlets reported speculation that Gavin could be the birth father of Sharon Watts (Letitia Dean). Treadwell-Collins' comment that the character would "have a little foot in the past and a foot in the present" and is "holding the key to many more of the Square's secrets" caused David Brown, writer for Radio Times, to wonder what Gavin's connection to the past would be, saying "it's surely no coincidence that Sharon has recently been searching for her birth dad—a man who we know to also be called Gavin." Brown said it would "make for some intriguing family dynamics." Inside Soap said that they had a hunch that Kathy's husband Gavin and Sharon's father Gavin could be the same person, making Sharon Kathy's stepdaughter. All About Soap said it "cannot be a coincidence" that Sharon's real father has the same name.

Speculation increased when on-location photos emerged, showing Kathy with police outside a house, which looks similar to scenes already shown of Sharon visiting the street where her father lives, and both scenes took place in Notting Hill. Carl Greenwood from the Daily Mirror said that "Two huge EastEnders storylines could be set to converge" if Gavin is Sharon's father. An EastEnders source said: "Eagle-eyed viewers will spot police are in the same area as Sharon was looking for her dad". Brown later said that it would "be a treat" to see Gavin revealed as Sharon's father, as it would also make him the grandfather of Dennis "Denny" Rickman Jnr (Bleu Landau), Sharon's son with Dennis Rickman (Nigel Harman), and said "Something tells me that Gavin wouldn't be cheery grandpa offering up the Werther's Originals to Denny while they watch the Antiques Roadshow together. More likely, he'd be getting him down Basher Jim's for a bit of boxing training before introducing him into his criminal empire." However, All About Soap wondered if Phil had actually sent Sharon to a fake address. Amy Duncan from the Metro said, "perhaps there are just two Gavins with links to Albert Square living in Notting Hill." Duncan Lindsay from the Metro wondered if Phil might know that Gavin is Sharon's father, which is why he did not want Sharon to track down her real father and also speculated that Gavin could be related to the character Dan Sullivan, who was played by Craig Fairbrass between 1999 and 2001 and was one of Phil's enemies.

Gavin was confirmed to be Sharon's birth father in the episode broadcast on 30 October 2015, in which he repeated Sharon's adopted father Den Watts's (Leslie Grantham) iconic line "Hello, princess". Digital Spy's Daniel Kilkelly said EastEnders had "delivered the daddy of all cliffhangers". Taylforth confirmed that her character Kathy is unaware of the connection between Sharon and Gavin, and said, "[Sharon]'s always said that she would walk into a room and know straight away [when she meets her father], and especially when he said those words: 'Hello princess'. We had the full scripts for the episode, but the other cast members didn't know what was going on. Paul was just fantastic delivering that line." Nicholas said that the "hello, princess" line was used because it was a definite way of linking Gavin and Den. Inside Soap said that Sharon discovering Gavin is her father "has to be the biggest [bombshell] of all" for Sharon, but added that viewers had already guessed before the episode was broadcast. Soaplife thought it was the "most shocking reveal" of 2015 in all British soap operas, saying they were "stunned". They also opined that Gavin seemingly genuinely wants to reconnect with Sharon and be a father to her and seems very fond of Dennis, and that if Sharon were to reject him, he would probably try to kidnap Dennis.

=== Claudette Hubbard ===
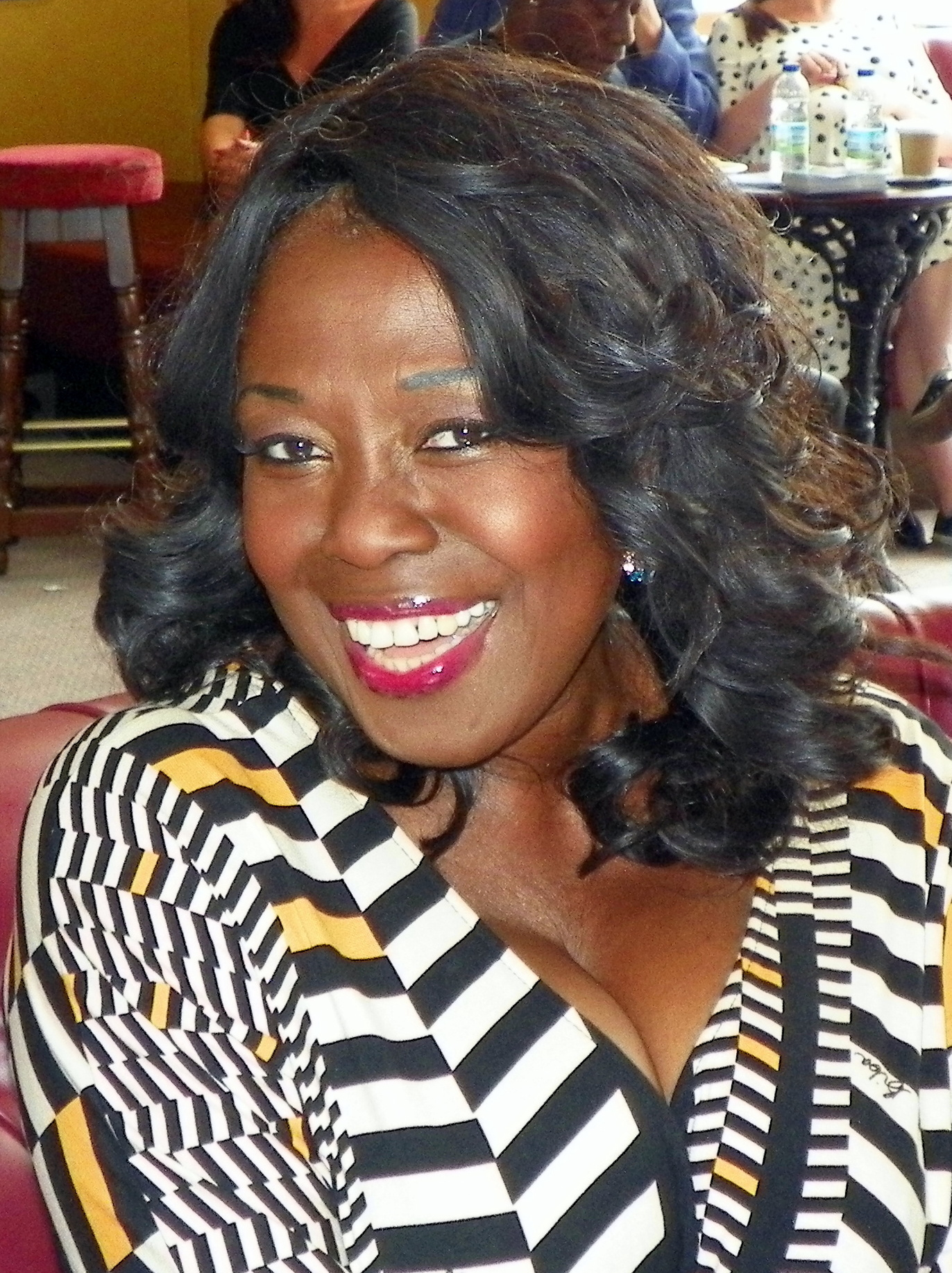
Gavin and Claudette (played by Ellen Thomas, pictured)

In scenes broadcast in February and March 2016, Gavin blackmails Claudette Hubbard (Ellen Thomas). The episodes are set on Mother's Day, which was called "the mother of all Mother's Days" by EastEnders. The Daily Mirror said that Gavin would get his comeuppance in the episodes and he would "meet his match" in Claudette, adding that "He may have destroyed Phil Mitchell's long-standing sobriety, but he won't get one over on the fearsome Claudette." An EastEnders source explained that Gavin could "rip her family apart" and said, "Gavin is used to being the one who dishes out the pain—but oh, how the tables have turned. Viewers will be on the edge of their seats waiting to find out if she has killed him." They also said that "Claudette and Vincent's relationship will never be the same again" because of what has happened with Gavin. The Metro compared the scene where Claudette hits Gavin over the head with a candelabra to "a live-action version of Cluedo" calling Claudette "Miss Scarlett" and Gavin "Dr Black".

=== Departure and off-screen death ===
Gavin's final storyline sees him kidnapping Kathy, killing his sister Margaret Midhurst (Jan Harvey) and being arrested. Nicholas said of the storyline, "Gavin will be up to the usual sullied, nasty things", while Taylforth explained, "He is coming back to cause the usual mayhem that he always does. Paul is great playing a villain, we all love him to bits! He still controls Kathy in a certain way. She thought last time that she could control him – as soon as starts talking to her, he wins her over again—as he always does!" The storyline includes a cliffhanger where it is not known if it is Margaret or Kathy who has been killed. Kilkelly said the end of the episode was a "sinister surprise" and that "Gavin Sullivan appeared to reach villainous new heights". Duncan Lindsay from the Metro said of Gavin, "He's clearly lost it and with a body on his hands and the control slipping from his grasp, there's no telling what Gavin might do next", adding that "The final chapter of the saga is about to unfold in dramatic fashion."

While promoting the storyline, Nicholas said he had enjoyed working on EastEnders but did not know if he would return again. Nicholas also said that Gavin is "trying to get [Kathy] back and he is trying to stay in control. He is very much how the mood takes him—whether he tips over to being nice or being nasty. It could go very badly wrong". Following the episode on 5 July 2016 in which Gavin lures Kathy to his mansion under false pretences, Sarah Deen from the Metro said that Gavin "must have a head made of concrete" after surviving being hit on the head with a vase, and called the episode "tense and creepy" and like a "horror movie". Lindsay said that Gavin made a "shock exit" in the following episode, and said "he remained a villain to the very end." In February 2021, Dean and Taylforth were photographed filming on-location scenes which depicted Gavin's wake, and Digital Spy confirmed that the character had been killed off off-screen.

== Storylines ==
Having faked her own death, Gavin's wife, Kathy Sullivan (Gillian Taylforth), makes plans to escape Gavin and asks Phil Mitchell (Steve McFadden) for money on several occasions, saying she is willing to go to prison so she can eventually reunite with her family in Walford. Kathy and Phil arrange to meet at St Pancras International, but she cannot meet him because her son, Ian Beale (Adam Woodyatt), is there. As she leaves, Gavin surprises her, revealing he knows what she has planned. After Kathy makes attempts to contact someone at The Queen Victoria public house, Gavin arrives on Albert Square. He texts Phil, pretending to be Kathy, and meets him, revealing that after St Pancras, he and Kathy planned to fly themselves to Spain but Kathy escaped by crashing the car. Phil discovers that Kathy is staying in a guest house in Kent, but Gavin follows Phil there and finds Kathy first. Phil realises they have gone to a local airfield, so he stops them from leaving and convinces Kathy to go back with him, leaving Gavin behind. When Phil meets Kathy at her hotel room, she agrees with him that there should be no more contact between them. After Phil leaves, it is revealed that Gavin has manipulated her into saying this. Phil goes missing after Gavin and two men confront him at his garage. After Kathy's sons, Ian and Ben Mitchell (Harry Reid), discover she is alive, Gavin finds Kathy in Walford. He tells Kathy to stick to their plan and Phil will stay alive. When Kathy reunites with Ben, Kathy says that she needs all of Phil's money or Gavin will kill him, and Gavin later tells Kathy he will harm Ian and Ben if she does not get the money that night. Kathy decides to go to the police to confess to fraud and to report Phil's kidnapping. When Ian finds out, he calls Gavin, saying he knows what Gavin has done, but Gavin now knows that Kathy has not stuck to their plan. Kathy realises Gavin probably has Phil at his sister's house, but when they get there, Gavin and Phil are gone, but Phil's blood is found. Phil, a recovering alcoholic, gets back home but is covered in cuts and bruises and has broken bones, and reveals to Ben that Gavin deliberately got him drinking alcohol again.

Phil has a panic button installed and Kathy helps the police trace Gavin via his mobile phone. Ben tells Gavin to leave or be arrested, as the police have arrived. Ben tells his family that Gavin has left, but Gavin returns, where Cora Cross (Ann Mitchell) apparently recognises him and appears fearful. On Halloween, Kathy is on edge, and she fears Gavin has gone into Ian's house. Ben and Kathy then see Gavin, but are unsure it was him. They go to Phil's house, where Gavin locks Phil and Dennis Rickman Jnr (Bleu Landau) in a bedroom. When Kathy attempts to call the police, Gavin appears. He threatens to light fireworks inside the house, hoping to kill himself, Kathy, Ben, Phil and Dennis. Sharon Mitchell (Letitia Dean), Phil's wife and Dennis's mother, arrives and Gavin reveals he knows that Sharon is the adoptive daughter of Den Watts (Leslie Grantham) and Angie Watts (Anita Dobson). Gavin surprises Kathy by saying that Walford was once his home and he had a child. Sharon realises Gavin could be her birth father, and he confirms it when he says, "Hello, princess", which Den used to say to her. Kathy pleads with Gavin not to light the fireworks and promises to leave with him again. Phil escapes, knocks Gavin unconscious and ties him up. While Sharon talks to Kathy, she realises that Margaret Midhurst (Jan Harvey), the solicitor who arranged her adoption and who she has been visiting to track her father, is Gavin's sister. When Gavin wakes up, Sharon asks about her adoption; Gavin says he had a fling with Carol Hanley (Sheila White), who had a breakdown after Sharon's birth, and Gavin was not paternal but Den was, so he traded Sharon for part in a bank raid that Den was working on. Phil then tells Sharon that Gavin previously had him locked in a room with no windows and just a bottle of whisky, meaning Phil turned to alcohol. Sharon decides to call the police so presses Phil's panic button. Sharon then confronts Gavin, who tells her that he asked Den to greet Sharon for him occasionally by calling her "princess". When the police arrive, Gavin has gone. Sharon reveals she took money from Phil's safe to let Gavin go, and when she meets Margaret again, she confirms she helped Gavin fake his death and gives Sharon his phone number. Sharon calls and leaves a message, and later receives a text message, saying they will see each other soon.

On Christmas Day, Gavin texts Sharon and later arrives at her house, saying he has missed her. Sharon hurries him out and he leaves her a present. He also visits her in hospital when Dennis is involved in a car accident. He invites her to Hong Kong but she declines, promising to still keep in touch and thanking him for the present. When Sharon tells Gavin that she is ending her marriage to Phil, he visits her, offering his support. She rejects him and the gift he has left for Dennis, saying she does not want liars in her life, but he insists he has never lied to her and reminds her of his offer to join him overseas, insisting that he will have a steady job and that he wants a second chance of having a family. Sharon and Dennis later join Gavin.

The following month, Kathy is shocked when Gavin appears in her home. She threatens to call the police, but he asks her to pass on a message to Sharon, revealing that he has been on holiday with her and Dennis, but she left. Dot Branning (June Brown) then arrives, and eventually she remembers Gavin from his childhood in Walford, saying that he was a troublemaker who stole money from Ethel Skinner (Gretchen Franklin), and warns Kathy off getting involved. Gavin simply says he wants the opportunity to be a good father and grandfather, and cries when he remembers that he was unwanted by his own mother. After Dot leaves, Kathy realises that Gavin does not like being on his own and promises to pass on the message. Before he leaves, he kisses Kathy as a thank you, saying he misses her. Kathy speaks to Sharon, who reveals that she left the holiday because Gavin hit Dennis. Sharon meets Gavin who says he did it out of love but Sharon wants nothing to do with him. Later, Sharon discovers that Gavin has collected Dennis from school and given him a mobile phone. She meets Gavin and offers him £100,000 to leave forever, revealing that she is selling her half of her bar to fund this. Gavin asks her for another chance but she rejects him and he leaves. After Sharon tells Gavin it will take some weeks to get the money, Gavin sees Claudette Hubbard (Ellen Thomas) and her family and concludes that they must be wealthy. Gavin blackmails Claudette, threatening to reveal a secret from her past. Claudette attempts to pay Gavin with sex, but afterwards he says it is not a payment and asks how Claudette killed her husband, Henry. When he demands more money, she strikes him over the head with a candelabra. She believes he is dead and takes him to the basement, and when her son Vincent Hubbard (Richard Blackwood) arrives, she lies about the circumstances, but when Gavin escapes, her lies are revealed to Vincent. Gavin returns to Claudette's home and meets Vincent, who says Claudette has left the country. Gavin says he will track her down, so Vincent offers to pay off the money Gavin claims she owes him. Sharon then meets Gavin and gives him the money from her sale of her bar (to Vincent), and he asks for a reconciliation but she rejects him. He meets Margaret, saying she will get her share of the money, and states that Sharon is now dead to him as he has another plan, which Margaret calls "insane".

Two months later, it is revealed that Dennis and Gavin are still in contact. After another six weeks, Margaret visits Sharon, saying that Gavin is acting strangely, but Sharon dismisses this and sends Margaret away. Later, Gavin tells Kathy he has Dennis so she reluctantly gets in his car and is seen leaving by Buster Briggs (Karl Howman). Sharon sees that Dennis has been in contact with Gavin and Buster tells Sharon what he saw so, fearing for Kathy's safety, they get Gavin's address from Dennis. Kathy and Gavin arrive at a large country house that he bought with Sharon's money, and he locks them in, saying they can live there together. Kathy realises that Dennis is not there, and then Margaret arrives. Gavin locks Kathy in a room as Margaret and Gavin argue, and Margaret knocks Gavin unconscious and lets Kathy out of the room. Gavin regains consciousness and the women try to escape. As Sharon and Buster arrive, a woman falls onto the windscreen of the car and lies dead on the floor. Sharon realises it is Margaret, and she and Buster break into the house where Buster finds Kathy while Sharon confronts Gavin, who is packing a bag with cash. Sharon locks the door and Gavin insists that Margaret's death was an accident. Sharon asks him why he stayed in contact with Dennis when she paid him to stay away, so he says he would never harm his grandson. She tells him to give himself up to the police and if he does so, she will visit him in prison with Dennis and they can be a family when he gets released. Police and paramedics then arrive, as Sharon called them and Gavin accuses her of stalling until they arrived, but she insists she called them for Margaret's sake. Gavin says he will give himself up to the police so Sharon unlocks the bedroom door, but he then tries to escape. He sees his only way out is via the balcony but he is too scared of harming himself to jump. Sharon joins him on the balcony and he asks Sharon to tell the police that Margaret fell. A police officer then arrives on the balcony and Gavin grabs Sharon, threatening to jump, killing them both. Sharon says he could never kill himself so he lets her go and she tells him it is over between them. Gavin is then arrested.

More than five years later, Gavin's sister, Sally (Jill Stanford) calls Kathy to inform her that Gavin has died. Kathy and Sharon attend the wake where they meet Sally and various other relatives. Zack Hudson (James Farrar) raises a scathing toast to Gavin and is chased by his cousins. In the ensuing distraction of the chase, Sharon snatches Gavin's urn and dumps it in the bin outside. Before they leave, Zack hides out in Sharon's car while Gavin's irate relatives look for him. When Sharon asks how Zack knows Gavin, he replies that he is his son, making him Sharon's half-brother. It emerges that Gavin has willed a safety deposit box to Sharon and the key to Zack, respectively. When Zack and Sharon open the box they find nothing of any value.

== Reception ==
Nicholas's casting in the role was praised by All About Soap, who said, "We reckon this is ace casting—doesn't he look like he belongs in Walford? We can just picture him in The Vic!" Frances Taylor, writing on BT Group's website, said that Gavin's introduction "got the nation talking about EastEnders for all the right reasons".

After the reveal that Gavin is Sharon's father, Inside Soap said, "Gavin cemented himself as Walford's Most Wicked when he subjected the Mitchells to the Halloween from hell. We've watched Kathy mither on about him for weeks, but the story only truly came to life when Gavin uttered the immortal wirds "'Ello Princess" to stunned daughter Sharon. Devilishly good." Former EastEnders writer Sarah Phelps was initially angry that Den Watts's catchphrase had been given to Gavin, saying in a post on Twitter, "Never ever piss on the memory of Den and Angie. Never. I wrote that f**king line [for Den's 2003 return]. That was Den. Not some turd in a syrup." However, the following day she posted, "[To be honest] now I'm not pissed as a stoat, [I] think Gavin manipulating Sharon will be cruel & intriguing". In July 2016, actor Leslie Grantham, who played Den between 1985 and 1989 and again from 2003 to 2005, said "I do find it strange that the show gave Den's catchphrase to someone else. Den is still remembered and people still ask me to say, 'Ello princess', because it was one of those bits that made him so popular! You do feel like you own it when you've made such an impact. Obviously the show moves on and there's a whole new generation now, but I think that's pretty poor writing."

In February 2016, Laura-Jane Tyler from Inside Soap said, "We're in awe of Gavin's ability to glide in and out of Walford houses undetected, as if he's wearing a magical raincoat of invisibility. He pops up all over the place! Is it because, like the shark he is, he needs to keep moving or else he'll die?" In June 2016, Sophie Dainty from Digital Spy included Gavin in a list of 10 soap opera villains she hoped would receive their comeuppance, opining that Gavin had not made "Archie Mitchell look like a care bear" as promised, adding that the fact that "he hasn't really done very much at all [...] leaves us feeling a little on edge", adding that "until he's humbled for good, we are fearful for those that have 'wronged' him." In December 2016, when reviewing the whole of 2016 in EastEnders, Tyler from Inside Soap said that "anything to do with Gavin" was "what went wrong" in 2016.

== See also ==
- List of soap opera villains
