= List of EastEnders characters introduced in 2015 =

EastEnders logo

EastEnders is a BBC soap opera that first aired on 19 February 1985. The following is a list of characters that first appeared in 2015, in order of first appearance. All characters were introduced by the show's executive producer Dominic Treadwell-Collins. January saw the arrival of the year's first baby, Matthew Mitchell Cotton, son of Ronnie Mitchell (Samantha Womack) and Charlie Cotton (Declan Bennett). The following month saw the show celebrate its 30th anniversary with a live week, which oversaw the live arrivals of Vincent Hubbard (Richard Blackwood), and the second baby born in 2015, Pearl Fox-Hubbard, Vincent's daughter with Kim Fox-Hubbard (Tameka Empson). In March, Claudette Hubbard (Ellen Thomas) arrived as Donna Yates' (Lisa Hammond) foster mother and an acquaintance of Les Coker (Roger Sloman) followed by Stan Carter's (Timothy West) friend Cyril Bishop (Andrew Sachs) and Sharon Mitchell's aunt Margaret Midhurst (Jan Harvey), whilst Denise van Outen joined in April as Karin Smart. May saw the arrivals of June Whitfield as Sister Ruth, Mick (Danny Dyer) and Linda Carter's (Kellie Bright) son Ollie Carter, the year's third baby, Mo Harris' (Laila Morse) business associate Fat Elvis and Kush Kazemi's (Davood Ghadami) mother, Carmel (Bonnie Langford). Paul Coker (Jonny Labey), the grandson of Les and Pam Coker (Lin Blakley), was introduced in June, as was Jade Masood (Amaya Edward), the long-lost daughter of Shabnam Masood (Rakhee Thakrar) and Dean Wicks (Matt Di Angelo). After Kathy Sullivan's (Gillian Taylforth) surprise return during the 30th anniversary in February, her husband Gavin Sullivan (Paul Nicholas) made his debut in August. September saw the arrivals of Max Branning's (Jake Wood) prosecution lawyer Hazel Warren (Clare Higgins) and Louie Beale, the baby son of Lauren Branning (Jacqueline Jossa) and Peter Beale (Ben Hardy). In October, Elaine Peacock's (Maria Friedman) toyboy lover Jason Adams (Scott Neal) was introduced, as well as first EastEnders transgender character to be played by a transgender actor, Kyle Slater (Riley Carter Millington). December saw the birth of the year's fifth baby, Kush and Stacey Branning's (Lacey Turner) son, Arthur Fowler. Additionally, multiple other characters appeared throughout the year.

== Matthew Mitchell Cotton ==
Matthew Mitchell Cotton
- EastEnders character
- Portrayed by: Zack Karbritz
- Duration: 2015–2017
- First appearance: Episode 4989; 1 January 2015
- Last appearance: Episode 5616; 15 December 2017
- Introduced by: Dominic Treadwell-Collins (2015); John Yorke (2017)
In-universe information
- Family: Mitchell
- Father: Charlie Cotton
- Mother: Ronnie Mitchell
- Stepfather: Jack Branning
- Stepmother: Liz Cotton
- Half-brothers: James Branning
- Half-sisters: Danielle Jones
- Grandfathers: Nick Cotton; Archie Mitchell
- Grandmothers: Yvonne Cotton; Glenda Mitchell
- Uncles: Ashley Cotton; Danny Mitchell
- Aunts: Roxy Mitchell; Dotty Cotton
- First cousins: Amy Mitchell
- Other relatives: Dot Cotton; Charlie Cotton; Phil Mitchell; Sam Mitchell; Ben Mitchell; Louise Mitchell; Ricky Mitchell; Billy Mitchell; Will Mitchell; Janet Mitchell; Lola Pearce; Lexi Pearce

Matthew Mitchell Cotton, portrayed by Zack Karbritz, is the son of Charlie Cotton (Declan Bennett) and Ronnie Mitchell (Samantha Womack). He is born during the episode broadcast on 1 January 2015 on his parents' wedding day.

Matthew is born after Ronnie is involved in a car accident. She is later placed in a coma, due to her injuries. Her sister, Roxy Mitchell (Rita Simons) and her boyfriend Aleks Shirovs (Kristian Kiehling) look after Matthew when Charlie refuses to see him, due to Ronnie's absence. Charlie's father, Nick Cotton (John Altman), takes Matthew from Roxy, attempting to force Charlie to see his son but Charlie refuses and gives him back to Roxy. Aleks suggests naming him Matthew after Nick's mother Dot Branning (June Brown) quotes from the Gospel of Matthew. Aleks's daughter Ineta Shirovs (Gledisa Arthur) becomes fed up with Aleks looking after Matthew and takes him to the bus stop, so they can go to the hospital. Charlie finds them and takes Matthew home. He and Roxy then share residency until Ronnie is discharged from hospital.

When Matthew is nine months old, he stays with Ronnie when she and Charlie separate, although Charlie vows to fight for custody. When Charlie tells Roxy he wants to take Matthew to France, she tells Ronnie. Roxy goes with Charlie but he soon realises that Ronnie and Roxy are working together when he sees Roxy constantly looking at her phone and Fatboy tells him that Vincent has told Ronnie, so he decides to leave with Matthew alone. However, Ronnie arrives before Charlie can board his train, and convinces him not to make the same mistakes as Nick did. Charlie leaves Matthew with Ronnie. Four days later, Charlie returns to Walford, having been persuaded by Dot to fight for custody, but Ronnie turns nasty when Charlie threatens to tell the police that she murdered Carl White (Daniel Coonan) and says that she will never see Matthew again. She and former boyfriend, Vincent Hubbard (Richard Blackwood), confront Charlie, who, in fear of his life, disappears. Matthew lives with Ronnie and her ex-husband, Jack Branning (Scott Maslen), when they reunite in March 2016 and Jack and Roxy's daughter, Amy Mitchell (Abbie Knowles) later moves in. Matthew is nearly hit by a car when Hannah Reynolds (Mia Jenkins) steps into the road whilst holding him, but is saved by Andy Flynn (Jack Derges), who pushes them out of the way of the approaching car.

On the night that Ronnie and Jack remarry on New Year's Day 2017, Ronnie and Roxy both die after drowning in the hotel swimming pool, leaving Matthew in Jack and his maternal grandmother Glenda Mitchell's (Glynis Barber) care when she moves in to help bring up the children. Glenda, Amy, Matthew and Jack's son Ricky Mitchell (Henri Charles) grow close but eventually she realises she is not what Jack, Amy, Ricky and Matthew need to get through Ronnie and Roxy's deaths so decides to leave Walford, while promising to remain a part of Amy and Matthew's lives. After taking Matthew to the garden centre in February 2017, Dot has an accident in her car due to her eyesight. She and Matthew are unharmed and taken home by the police. When Matthew goes missing, Jack's brother, Max Branning (Jake Wood), tells Jack that Matthew is at Dot's and when Jack goes to get him, Charlie answers the door, telling Jack they need to talk about Matthew. Jack reluctantly lets Charlie spend time with and look after Charlie. Charlie tells Dot that he has seen a solicitor about Matthew, who he plans to take back to Ireland with him. Dot tells Jack that Charlie is going to take Matthew back to Ireland and Charlie and Jack argue about it, with Jack later telling Charlie that he swore on Ronnie's grave to never leave Amy, Ricky and Matthew. When Charlie provokes Jack by saying Ronnie deserved to die, Jack punches him and Max tells Jack he may have lost his chances of keeping Matthew. Max learns that Jack still may get to keep Matthew despite the fight with Jack, so Max visits Charlie and beats him up to make it look like Jack did it. In April 2017, Jack is arrested and charged with assault. Dot attempts to mediate between Charlie and Jack, but they fail to come up with any solution and Jack plans to go on the run with Amy, Ricky and Matthew, but Dot tells Max and they talk him out of it. Charlie watches Honey Mitchell (Emma Barton) in the park with Amy, Ricky, Matthew and her children, Janet (Grace) and Will Mitchell (Freddie Phillips). Honey tells Charlie what a good father Jack is and Charlie informs Jack he has notified social services about applying for residency. Stacey Fowler (Lacey Turner) tells Jack he has to work things out with Charlie. Charlie's wife, Liz Cotton (Michelle Connolly) arrives in Albert Square in place of Charlie and tells Jack about her job and family, trying to assure him that Matthew would have a good life and that Amy and Ricky would be welcome to visit. Jack phones Liz to arrange a visit and agree rules for Matthew, letting Charlie have residency. Jack and Dot are heartbroken when Matthew leaves with Charlie and Liz.

Charlie and Matthew return in December 2017 and Charlie explains to Jack the reason for their return is that Matthew refers to Jack as "dad". Charlie also tells Jack that he just wanted contact and that having Matthew full-time was not part of the "plan", so Jack demands to know what the plan was. Charlie tells Jack that Max set him up. After initially denying it, Max admits that he was responsible for Matthew being taken away as payback and Jack throws Max out. Meanwhile, Charlie leaves Walford once again with Matthew.

Reporters for the Daily Mirror called Matthew an "unfortunate boy".

== Vincent Hubbard ==
Vincent Hubbard, played by Richard Blackwood, made his first screen appearance on 17 February 2015. The character and casting was announced on 17 January 2015. Blackwood praised bosses for the character of Vincent, stating he knew that his portrayal would surprise viewers given his comedy background. He is described on the BBC website as: 'a smooth operator, whose easy charm and quick wittedness covers a steely, ruthless streak and a reputation as a bit of a bad boy.' The BBC then go on to also state that Vincent 'believes himself to be the "main man" in the room, and knows how to play people to his advantage.'

== Pearl Fox ==
Pearl Fox
- EastEnders character
- Portrayed by: Arayah Harris-Buckle
- Duration: 2015–present
- First appearance: Episode 5017/5018; 19 February 2015
- Introduced by: Dominic Treadwell-Collins
In-universe information
- Other names: Pearl Fox-Hubbard
- Father: Vincent Hubbard
- Mother: Kim Fox
- Stepfather: Howie Danes
- Brothers: Mica Fox
- Grandmothers: Claudette Hubbard; Emerald Fox
- Aunts: Denise Fox; Daphne Fox
- First cousins: Chelsea Fox; Libby Fox; Raymond Fox
- Other relatives: Jordan Fox

Pearl Fox (also Fox-Hubbard), played by Arayah Harris-Buckle, is the daughter of Kim Fox-Hubbard (Tameka Empson) and Vincent Hubbard (Richard Blackwood). She was born during the live episode broadcast on 19 February 2015 during the show's 30th anniversary celebrations.

Pearl is born in the ladies' toilets of The Queen Victoria public house after Kim goes into labour two months early. She is placed in intensive care following her birth and Kim is told that she has an infection. A week later, Kim has Pearl christened with the middle names Denise and Patrice, named after her sister, Denise Fox (Diane Parish), and Denise's surrogate father, Patrick Trueman (Rudolph Walker) respectively, and is told that she has recovered from her infection. In March 2015, Kim is able to bring Pearl home to Albert Square. Eventually, Kim and Vincent reunite and Vincent moves in so he can become a proper father to Pearl. Kim and Vincent enter her in a baby contest, which she wins after Vincent pays the competition manager. As Vincent's feud with Phil Mitchell (Steve McFadden) escalates in December 2015, Phil kidnaps Pearl while she is being looked after by Vincent's foster sister Donna Yates (Lisa Hammond), but is safely being looked after by Honey Mitchell (Emma Barton).

Gary Gillatt from Inside Soap observed that Pearl's name was his favourite "subtle touch" for the show's birthday celebrations, as Pearl is the gift traditionally given on a 30th anniversary. While Heat's Kay Ribeiro was disappointed that Kim did not name her after Queen Victoria, considering where she was born. Ribeiro also thought that Kim would have chosen "something suitably flashy and fabulous but chose the surprisingly demure name, Pearl. Oh well, each to their own." Katy Brent from the Daily Mirror commented "You'd think that being born in Albert Square, in the Vic, on the 30th anniversary of the show, would be a good omen for any baby. Sadly, that doesn't seem to be the case for baby Pearl, whose little life is hanging in the balance." Brent hoped Pearl would come through her illness, so there would be a happy outcome for a change.

== Claudette Hubbard ==
Claudette Hubbard, played by Ellen Thomas, made her first appearance on 12 March 2015. Claudette is introduced as a friend of Les Coker (Roger Sloman) and Pam Coker (Lin Blakley), before being established as the mother of Vincent Hubbard (Richard Blackwood), as well as the foster mother of Donna Yates (Lisa Hammond) and several other children. Upon her introduction, the character was described as a "new steely matriarch".

During her time on the show, Claudette's storylines included being accused of an affair with Les Coker, before it was ultimately revealed she was aiding his cross-dressing, her history with the Mitchell family, a feud with Babe Smith (Annette Badland) and ultimately being left for dead and buried alive by her son Vincent after revealing she was responsible for the death of her husband. On 13 September 2016, it was confirmed that Thomas would depart her role as Claudette and would leave the soap after being axed by the new executive producer, Sean O'Connor along with several other characters. Speaking on her exit, an EastEnders spokesperson said ""As our regular viewers will know, Claudette has often been seen coming and going from the [Albert Square] to visit her family and friends" concluding that "this is the end of another stint for Claudette and we wish [Thomas] all the best for the future." She made her final appearance on 1 November 2016.

== Cyril Bishop ==
Cyril Bishop
- EastEnders character
- Portrayed by: Andrew Sachs
- First appearance: Episode 5034; 18 March 2015
- Last appearance: Episode 5035; 19 March 2015
- Introduced by: Dominic Treadwell-Collins

Cyril Bishop, played by Andrew Sachs, appears on 18 and 19 March 2015. He is a cancer patient who Stan Carter (Timothy West) befriends when he is admitted to hospital. Cyril is in a bed on the same ward as Stan. He is visited by his family, which Stan witnesses, having told his own family not to come and see him. He talks to Stan about his love of Carry On films and they share their thoughts on their situations. Their relationship turns sour when Stan realises that his family do not care for him like Cyril's family do. Later in the day, Cyril dies during an argument between Babe Smith (Annette Badland) and Cora Cross (Ann Mitchell).

Sachs' role as Stan's hospital roommate was revealed on 10 March 2015, when it was said he would be part of Stan's exit storyline. Duncan Lindsay from the Metro said, "Stan becomes infuriated by Cyril's presence but something tells us that before the inevitable heartbreaking finale of the tale, the pair could become good friends a la Morgan Freeman and Jack Nicholson in The Bucket List", and said that Sachs' appearance in the show is "a treat for viewers".

== Margaret Midhurst ==
Margaret Midhurst
- EastEnders character
- Portrayed by: Jan Harvey
- Duration: 2015–2016
- First appearance: Episode 5038; 24 March 2015
- Last appearance: Episode 5312; 8 July 2016
- Introduced by: Dominic Treadwell-Collins
In-universe information
- Occupation: Solicitor
- Mother: Ivy Sullivan
- Brothers: Gavin Sullivan
- Sisters: Sally Sullivan
- Nephews: Zack Hudson
- Nieces: Sharon Watts

Margaret Midhurst, played by Jan Harvey, appears in nine episodes between 24 March 2015 and 8 July 2016.

Margaret is the solicitor who handled Sharon Mitchell's (Letitia Dean) adoption. Sharon visits Margaret in a bid to find her biological father. Margaret tells Sharon that all the paperwork in connection with her case had been destroyed. She later visits Sharon at home after Sharon calls her, and asks Margaret if her adoptive father, Den Watts (Leslie Grantham), was her biological father, fearing that her son Dennis Rickman Jnr (Harry Hickles/Bleu Landau) could be a product of incest. Margaret assures Sharon that Den was not her biological father but reveals that Den had not wanted the adoption discussed at The Queen Victoria public house, making Sharon conclude that her biological father was someone Den knew. Sharon later arranges for Carol Jackson (Lindsey Coulson) to meet Margaret and she offers to represent Carol's brother Max Branning (Jake Wood) when he is charged with the murder of Lucy Beale (Hetti Bywater) (see "Who Killed Lucy Beale?"). Before Margaret goes to the prison to meet Max, Sharon informs her she has decided not to find her father, insisting that she needs to move on from her past. When Carol starts to believe Max is guilty, she relieves Margaret of her duties. Sharon offers to pay her for her services and Margaret reveals that she will inform Max that she is dropping the case and that he needs to find another lawyer to represent him. when Sharon visits Margaret to file for divorce from Phil, it is clear that Margaret is covering for someone when the police arrive at her offices. It later emerges that Margaret is Gavin Sullivan's (Paul Nicholas) sister, and Gavin is Sharon's birth father, making Margaret Sharon's aunt, and Gavin asked Margaret to make sure Sharon did not find out, after she told him that Sharon was trying to find him.

After Gavin gets money from Vincent Hubbard (Richard Blackwood) after attempting to blackmail his mother Claudette Hubbard (Ellen Thomas), a former associate of Gavin's, and from Sharon, who wants him to leave Walford forever, he meets Margaret and it is revealed she is in on his plan, but is against his next plan, which she calls "insane". Several months later, Margaret visits Sharon and tells her that Gavin is acting strangely, but Sharon dismisses it and sends Margaret away. Later, Margaret arrives at Gavin's house, where he has brought his wife, Kathy (Gillian Taylforth) under false pretences. Gavin locks Kathy in a room while Margaret questions Gavin's motives as Kathy now knows where he lives and she fears she will also be implicated in Gavin's crimes, however, Gavin tells her that Kathy will not be leaving. Margaret rescues Kathy from the room after hitting Gavin over the head with a vase, however, he regains consciousness and the two women try to hide from him. Sharon and Buster Briggs (Karl Howman) arrive, having seen Kathy leaving Walford with Gavin and got the address from Dennis, and then a woman falls onto the windscreen of their car and breaking her neck and is killed instantly. They see that it is Margaret who fell to her death from a balcony after a struggle with Gavin.

=== Development and reception ===
Harvey's casting was announced at the same time as that of June Whitfield in the role of Sister Ruth, on 5 March 2015. Harvey said of her initial filming, "I loved working on such an iconic show. Everyone was so welcoming. EastEnders is really like one big family." Executive producer Dominic Treadwell-Collins said, "We are extremely privileged to have two British television legends joining us for guest roles as Albert Square heads into the spring. Both June and Jan are class acts, bringing warmth and humanity to two characters who will shed some light on the pasts of two of our most iconic women—Sharon Mitchell and Kat Moon (Jessie Wallace)—changing both their lives in very different ways."

Inside Soap called Margaret "wicked" and hoped to see more of her, saying "what could be more fun than Sharon having an evil auntie?"

== Karin Smart ==
Karin Smart
- EastEnders character
- Portrayed by: Denise van Outen
- First appearance: Episode 5047; 9 April 2015
- Last appearance: Episode 5058; 28 April 2015
- Introduced by: Dominic Treadwell-Collins
In-universe information
- Occupation: Businesswoman
- Husband: Trevor Smart (widowed)

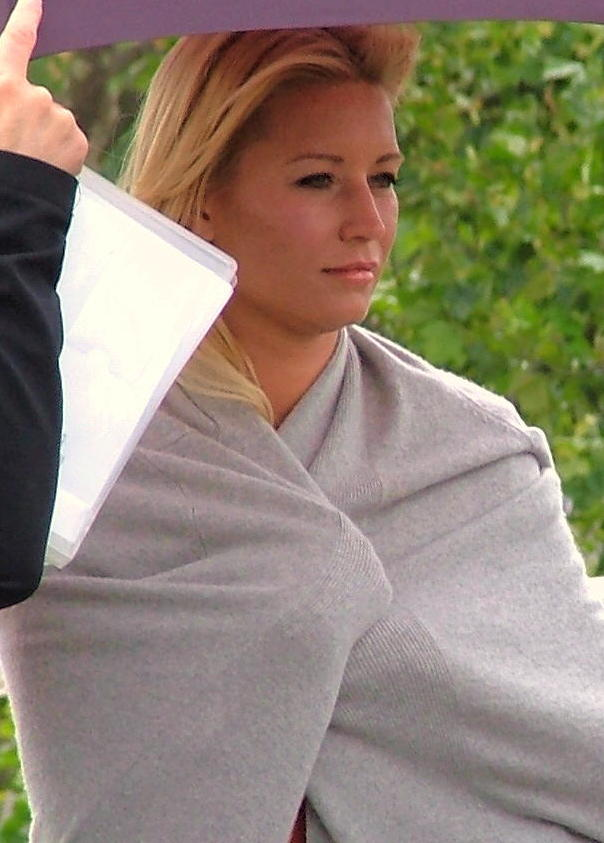
Denise van Outen guest starred as Karin Smart in April 2015.

Karin Smart, played by Denise van Outen, made her first screen appearance on 9 April 2015. Van Outen's casting was announced on 2 February 2015. Of her casting, she stated "I'm really excited to be joining EastEnders, as I've been a fan of the series for years. 2015 marks the show's 30th anniversary, so it feels even more special to be part of this year's celebration." Van Outen described Karin as manipulative, cheeky and mischievous and revealed that her character would "cause chaos for two men", adding that "it won't just be the men who Karin is winding up – the women of Walford won't like her either." Karin arrived in Albert Square for two episodes on 9 and 10 April, looking for Phil Mitchell (Steve McFadden). She then returned for a further two episodes from 27 April.

Max Branning (Jake Wood) is impressed by Karin when she approaches him asking for the whereabouts of Phil, and Jay Brown (Jamie Borthwick) warns him that Karin's deceased husband was involved in a dodgy business. Max dismisses Jay and goes on to form a deal with Karin at the car lot, and the two later end up having sex, though it is implied that Phil had meant this to happen. The following morning, Karin visits Phil and he pays her a large sum of money; she leaves. Jay later reveals to Max that the cars Karin has supplied him with are stolen, so Max orders Karin to return and collect them. However, he changes his mind after a conversation between him and his sister, Carol Jackson (Lindsey Coulson). Karin returns to tell Max that the police have begun seizing the cars and that some have drugs in them. She tells Max to dump the cars and then takes his clothes to stop the police tracing his involvement. Phil agrees to help Max on the condition he sign over all of his businesses to Phil. After Max does so, Phil and Karin tell Max they made the whole story up to con him out of his businesses. Karin collects her final payment. She assures Max it was not personal, tells him "Karin Smart" is not her real name and leaves.

== Sister Ruth ==
Sister Ruth
- EastEnders character
- Portrayed by: June Whitfield
- Duration: 2015–2016
- First appearance: Episode 5060; 1 May 2015
- Last appearance: Episode 5206; 6 January 2016
- Introduced by: Dominic Treadwell-Collins
In-universe information
- Occupation: Nun
- Sons: Tony
- Daughters: Barbara

Sister Ruth, played by June Whitfield, appears in three episodes on 1 May 2015, and 5 and 6 January 2016. Ruth is a nun at a care home for nuns that had previously been the nunnery where Kat Moon (Jessie Wallace) gave birth to her daughter Zoe Slater (Michelle Ryan) 31 years previously. Kat wants closure as Zoe was the product of rape by her uncle Harry Slater (Michael Elphick). Ruth was present at the birth and remembers it in detail. She and Kat discuss things and Ruth helps Kat to move on with her life. After Kat leaves, Ruth and Sister Judith (Sandy McDade) look at the birth record, seeing that Kat gave birth to twins, Zoe and a boy. When Kat returns from Spain after winning the lottery, she agrees to make a charitable donation to the convent. Judith arrives in Walford and finds Kat, telling her that Ruth could not come as she is unwell. Kat sees Ruth arrive later, so invites her into her house, and Ruth tells her the full truth about what happened at the convent. She reveals that Kat passed out before giving birth to the boy, and that her mother Viv Slater ordered that he be taken away from her, so he was adopted by a family in Ireland shortly after. Ruth then relays her experiences of losing her children to an airstrike in World War II. Ruth then reveals to Kat that Viv telephoned someone that night who must have known about the son, and Kat discovers that it was her grandmother Mo Harris (Laila Morse).

Whitfield's casting was announced at the same time as that of Jan Harvey in the role of Margaret Midhurst, on 5 March 2015. Whitfield was originally announced to be appearing in a single episode. She said of her initial filming, "I have watched EastEnders for years, and have been so impressed by the standard of acting. It was an absolute delight to work with Jessie Wallace and I am very excited to be part of the show." Executive producer Dominic Treadwell-Collins said, "We are extremely privileged to have two British television legends joining us for guest roles as Albert Square heads into the spring. Both June and Jan are class acts, bringing warmth and humanity to two characters who will shed some light on the pasts of two of our most iconic women—Sharon Mitchell (Letitia Dean) and Kat Moon—changing both their lives in very different ways." In July 2016, Whitfield said she thought Ruth was the first time she had played a nun, and when asked if she could return to EastEnders, said she thought that Ruth had since died because her ill health was mentioned in the show. Digital Spy writer Charlotte Whistlecroft said, "it would make sense given how desperate Ruth was to tell Kat the truth about her secret son."

== Ollie Carter ==
Ollie Carter
- EastEnders character
- Portrayed by: Jack Tilley (2015–2016); Charlie Harrington (2016–2017); Harry Farr (2017–present)
- Duration: 2015–present
- First appearance: Episode 5066; 12 May 2015
- Introduced by: Dominic Treadwell-Collins
In-universe information
- Father: Mick Carter
- Mother: Linda Carter
- Stepmother: Janine Butcher
- Brothers: Lee Carter; Johnny Carter
- Sisters: Nancy Carter
- Half-sisters: Frankie Lewis; Annie Carter
- Grandfathers: Buster Briggs; John Peacock
- Grandmothers: Shirley Carter; Elaine Peacock
- Uncles: Dean Wicks; Jimbo Wicks
- Aunts: Carly Wicks
- Nephews: Michael Carter
- First cousins: Jade Masood
- Other relatives: Tina Carter; Sylvie Carter; Babe Smith; Stan Carter; Zsa Zsa Carter

Oliver "Ollie" Carter is the youngest son of established characters Linda (Kellie Bright) and Mick Carter (Danny Dyer), born prematurely on 12 May 2015 after Linda experiences a fall down the stairs. Ollie is originally portrayed by Jack Tilley until 2016, after which he is portrayed by Charlie Harrington. Since 2017, Harry Farr has portrayed Ollie. Of the character's paternity, Laura-Jayne Tyler from Inside Soap commented "We knew, even at first sight, that EastEnders' adorable ickle new Carter couldn't have sprung from anyone as vile as Dean."

Linda falls pregnant with Ollie shortly after being raped by Mick's brother Dean Wicks (Matt Di Angelo). Concerned about the baby's paternity after the baby is born, Mick does a test which confirms that he and Linda both share the same blood group as Ollie. Mick tells Dean that his blood group does not match, and is happy to discover that he is the father. Linda names Ollie after Oliver Twist, from the musical of the same name. He is brought home by Mick and Linda. Following a fight between his older sister Nancy Carter (Maddy Hill) and his older brother Lee Carter (Danny Hatchard), Ollie is knocked out of his highchair, with Lee's girlfriend Whitney Dean (Shona McGarty) alerting Mick and Linda. He appears to be fine, despite Mick insisting they should take him to hospital. Linda later finds Ollie is not breathing, but successfully resuscitates him. He then suffers a seizure and is admitted to hospital where a doctor tells the Carters that Ollie has bleeding on his brain caused by a blow to the head, that Ollie could have brain damage, and that children's services must be informed. Mick blames Nancy, which causes tension in the family. Eventually, Mick realises Nancy is sorry and that she is not to blame and the family reconcile. Mick and Linda worry that Ollie does not respond in the way they expect and are frustrated by the lack of treatment as they have to wait to see the extent of the damage. After a heist involving Mick, he is suspected of stealing the money and Aidan Maguire (Patrick Bergin) frightens Linda when he lets himself into The Queen Vic when he has hold of Ollie. The Carters panic when Ollie and the pub is covered in petrol.

== Fat Elvis ==
Fat Elvis
- EastEnders character
- Portrayed by: Shenton Dixon
- Appears in: Episode 5072; 22 May 2015
- Introduced by: Dominic Treadwell-Collins
In-universe information
- Daughters: Tammy

Fat Elvis, played by Shenton Dixon, is a long-term business associate and love-interest of Mo Harris (Laila Morse). The character has been mentioned several times since 2004. He is usually mentioned when supplying Mo with dodgy goods to sell, or when the characters are involved in romance. Fat Elvis appears on 22 May 2015, after Mo reveals he has proposed marriage to her and she has accepted. However, several months later, Mo reveals that Fat Elvis has left her for his probation officer.

It was announced that his appearance would only be a one off for the time being, albeit with the option of additional appearances in the future. A source at EastEnders said, "Everyone on the show was really excited to finally put a face to the name of Fat Elvis. It's a one-off appearance for now, but who knows what could happen in the future..." ITV News called Fat Elvis a "cult character" and said that fans went "into meltdown" after his unannounced appearance in the show. The Daily Mirror said Fat Elvis's appearance was "a long, long, long time coming" and called the character "mysterious".

== Carmel Kazemi ==
Carmel Kazemi
- EastEnders character
- Portrayed by: Bonnie Langford
- Duration: 2015–2018
- First appearance: Episode 5074; 26 May 2015
- Last appearance: Episode 5806; 5 November 2018
- Introduced by: Dominic Treadwell-Collins
In-universe information
- Occupation: Market trader; Market inspector; Planning officer
- Husband: Umar Kazemi (until 2017)
- Sons: Kush Kazemi; Darius Kazemi; Shakil Kazemi
- Grandsons: Zaair Kazemi; Arthur Fowler

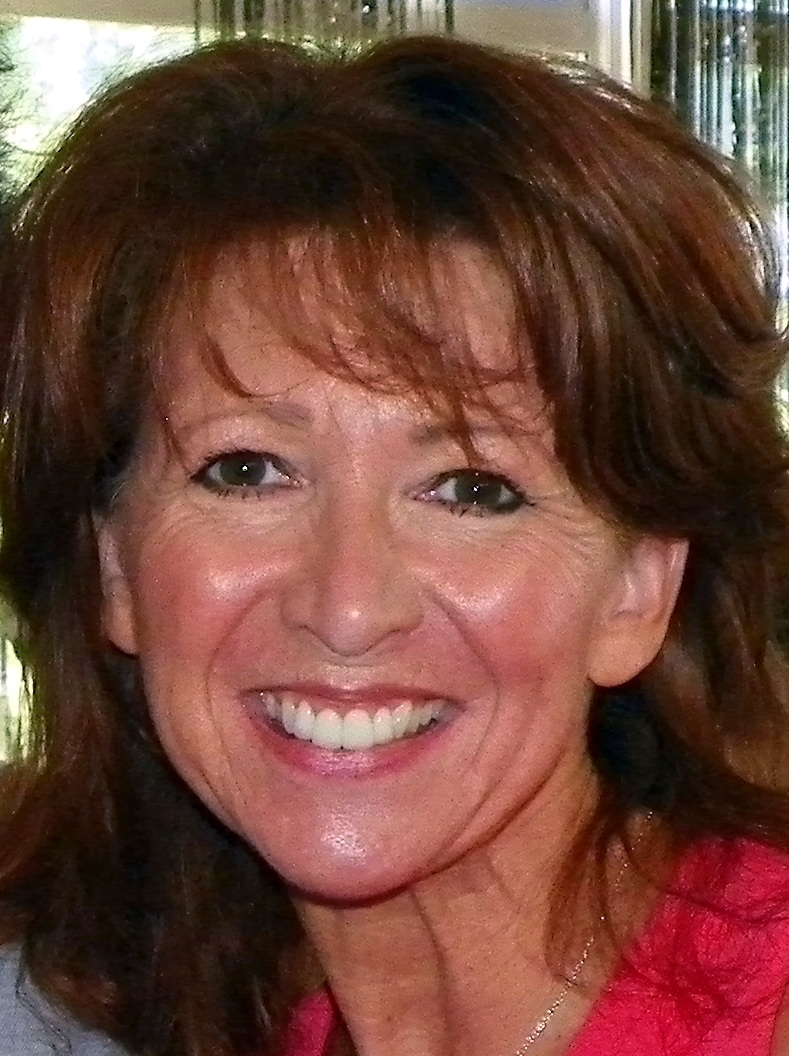
Bonnie Langford, who played Carmel from 2015 to 2018.

Carmel Kazemi, played by Bonnie Langford, made her first screen appearance on 26 May 2015. The character and Langford's casting was announced on 5 April 2015. The actress began filming her first scenes in the same month. Of her casting, Langford said "I'm so thrilled and delighted to be part of EastEnders. I'm a great fan of the show and think the recent 30th Anniversary was sensational and shows just how good British television can be. To be part of this family is an absolute privilege." Carmel is Kush Kazemi's (Davood Ghadami) mother. Executive producer Dominic Treadwell-Collins described the character as being a loud and embarrassing "modern Essex divorcée who isn't quite ready to cut the apron strings". He added that she would clash with Kush's fiancée Shabnam Masood (Rakhee Thakrar). Laura-Jane Tyler from Inside Soap praised Langford's first appearance and said "bright, bubbly and a touch inappropriate, Carmel has an air of Peggy Mitchell about her – but not half as irritating! More please EastEnders!" It was announced in August 2015 that Langford had signed a one-year contract with the show and that Carmel would become a regular character. Langford revealed her delight at this news. Laura-Jayne Tyler of Inside Soap was pleased with the news Carmel would be a regular character, "The shiny new plaque on Bonnie Langford's dressing room door suggest that Carmel is set for a long stay on the Square. We couldn't be happier!" It was announced on 12 July 2018 that Langford would be leaving the role at the end of the year. Carmel departed on 5 November 2018.

Carmel comes for dinner with Shabnam after she becomes engaged to Kush. She gets on well with her father, Masood Ahmed (Nitin Ganatra), and they go for a drink together, where Masood tells Carmel that Shabnam has a daughter that she abandoned seven years ago. Carmel is understanding and offers her support to Shabnam but this just angers Shabnam as it wasn't his place to tell anyone. Carmel visits frequently and Shabnam dislikes her interference with planning the wedding. She is delighted when Shabnam and Kush announce they are expecting. Carmel visits unannounced, distraught that Kush's father is selling her house and Shabnam begrudgingly allows her to stay with them but catches her in bed with Masood. After Kush learns that the baby is dead, Masood contacts Carmel and allows her to stay with him. Before returning to Essex, she and Masood help Kush and Shabnam reconcile for their stillborn son, Zaair's, funeral. Carmel returns in November for the wedding and before they leave for their honeymoon, she promises to run Kush's stall in his absence. She also befriends Denise Fox (Diane Parish).

Shortly after Kush and Shabnam return, Carmel sees Kush and a pregnant Stacey Branning (Lacey Turner) whispering and, after talking to Stacey, she realizes that Kush could be the baby's father. She confronts them but they persuade her not to tell Shabnam or Martin Fowler (James Bye), insisting it is not the right time. Carmel agrees, but warns Stacey that Kush may want access to the baby if it is his.

Carmel returns to the square in the spring, saying that her former husband, Umar Kazemi (Selva Rasalingam), is selling her house after all and that she has nowhere to live, so Kush allows her to move in with him and is joined by her youngest son, Shakil (Shaheen Jafargholi) a few weeks later. Shakil tells her that Umar wants to meet to discuss a possible reunion but it turns out that Shakil was lying, making Carmel feel unwanted but she and Shakil soon make up. Carmel is encouraged to apply for the job of market Inspector by Denise, and is overjoyed when she gets the job. She gets on the traders' nerves initially but soon learns to work with them. Carmel begins sleeping with Masood and she hopes that it will lead to a relationship but Masood leaves to travel the world, leaving Carmel devastated. She is later shocked to discover Denise is pregnant, telling her to book a scan and pressures her to tell her who the father is, infuriating Denise as the baby's father is Phil Mitchell (Steve McFadden). When she feels her flat is too crowded, she decides to rent No. 31 after Sonia Fowler (Natalie Cassidy) leaves the square. However, Martin opposes her as he wants the house for his family, so Carmel retracts her deposit and decides to rent No. 41, Masood's house instead. Whilst moving in, Masood returns unexpectedly, forcing them to share the house as she has already signed the contract. When Belinda Peacock (Carli Norris) begins a relationship with Masood, she doubts her motives and accuses her of only being with Masood for financial purposes, to save her debt ridden salon, "Elysium". However, Belinda leaves the square soon after. Carmel and Denise are later furious to discover that Masood is planning to move to Pakistan and accuses him of leaving to reunite with his former wife Zainab Masood (Nina Wadia). They all reconciled before Masood leaves, telling him they'll always be there for him, and watch him leave. Carmel tries to talk Denise out of her decision to give her newborn son up for adoption, but eventually decides to support her, not wanting to end their friendship. Carmel tries to reason with market traders when they hear that the market be relocated. During the dispute, a bus crashes into the market and the viaduct. Carmel survives the crash and worries over Shakil's welfare when she learns he is on board, but is later relieved when he jumps off the top deck safely with the help of the others at the bottom.

Carmel is shocked to discover that naked photos of Shakil have been sent around the school, and is angry to discover it was allegedly Shakil's former girlfriend, Bex Fowler (Jasmine Armfield) who sent them, although it was really Louise Mitchell (Tilly Keeper). Due to the tension between the Kazemis and the Fowlers, Martin and Stacey decide that Carmel should keep her distance from her grandson, which Carmel reacts badly to, and in the argument, she and Stacey physically fight after Carmel made a comment on Stacey's mental health. In April 2017, she becomes close to Max Branning (Jake Wood), after he helps her make amends with Stacey, and also helps her with an interview for the Walford Council planning committee. Although she remains oblivious to Max's scheming. When Masood returns from travelling, he informs Carmel that he is not going to renew her tenancy contract. Although disappointed, Carmel asks Max whether they should find a home of their own, which slightly displeases him. Carmel is then delighted that the council has dropped the investigation and decides to make her a full-time employee. Shortly after having sex with Max, Carmel finds an engagement ring while tidying up the house and mistakenly believes Max wants to propose to her, when in fact it is intended for his secret girlfriend Fi Browning (Lisa Faulkner). The following day Carmel still believes Max is going to propose to her and prepares to celebrate with him at The Queen Vic. However, when he walks into The Queen Vic, he deliberately ignores her and kisses Fi, humiliating Carmel in front of everyone and finally revealing his scheme. Realising she has been used, Carmel upsettingly storms out of the pub. Carmel and Shakil then moves in with Kush and Denise. While Carmel is at Windsor for the wedding of Prince Harry and Meghan Markle, Shakil is stabbed by a gang and the delay in finding him proves fatal. She rushes to the hospital to be told that her son has died. After hearing that Kush may still leave for Dubai, she feels helpless and tries to commit suicide by opioid overdose but she is then strengthened by the discovery of Shakil's watch. She attends Shakil's memorial in the Albert Square gardens and makes amends with Karen Taylor (Lorraine Stanley). Shakil's best friend, Keegan Baker (Zack Morris) takes her to where Shakil's killer, Bruno (Josh Fraser), lives and offers to square things but Carmel warns him against this and they have the police arrest Bruno; outside the police station, Carmel reveals herself to his mother, Sophie (Melanie Harris). When Carmel finds Keegan in possession of a knife, she anonymously hands it in and decides to campaign for a knife amnesty, where young people can hand in knives to a public knife bin and their identities remain secret. She then tries to start a youth club but fails. At Halloween, Keegan stabs a boy who disrespected Shakil and Carmel allows him to think that the boy died, Carmel and Karen have a heated argument leading to Keegan finally seeing sense. Carmel and Keegan make amends before she moves abroad.

In April 2021, Carmel discovers off-screen that Kush has died after being struck by a train. She is devastated to hear this and phones Martin to say that she will not be returning to Walford as it contains too many bad memories and would like Kush's body to be moved to her in Dubai.

Langford was nominated for the "Best Newcomer" award at The Inside Soap Awards 2015 for her portrayal of Carmel. She also won the "Best Newcomer" award at The British Soap Awards in 2016 for her portrayal of Carmel. In September 2016, Laura-Jane Tyler of Inside Soap described Carmel as the "life and soul of Walford" amid a time for the show when it was "on a low gas". In July 2018, Langford was longlisted for the "Best Actress" accolade at The Inside Soap Awards. She progressed to the viewer-voted shortlist in October 2018.

== Paul Coker ==
Paul Coker, played by Jonny Labey, made his first screen appearance on 1 June 2015. He is the grandson of Les Coker (Roger Sloman) and Pam Coker (Lin Blakley) and has a relationship with Ben Mitchell (Harry Reid). Labey was nominated, alongside Reid, for Best Affair at the Inside Soap Awards in 2015 for their portrayal of Paul and Ben's affair. On 19 April 2016, it was announced that Labey would be leaving the show, and Paul was killed-off on 19 July 2016 as part of a homophobia storyline.

== Jade Masood ==
Jade Masood
- EastEnders character
- Portrayed by: Amaya Edward (2015–2016); Elizabeth Green (2023–2024)
- Duration: 2015–2016, 2023–2024
- First appearance: Episode 5084; 12 June 2015
- Last appearance: Episode 6897; 25 April 2024
- Introduced by: Dominic Treadwell-Collins (2015); Chris Clenshaw (2023)
In-universe information
- Other names: Roya Masood (birth name); Jade Green
- Father: Dean Wicks
- Mother: Shabnam Masood
- Stepfather: Kush Kazemi
- Half-brothers: Zaair Kazemi
- Grandfathers: Buster Briggs; Masood Ahmed
- Grandmothers: Shirley Carter; Zainab Masood
- Uncles: Mick Carter; Jimbo Wicks; Syed Masood; Tamwar Masood; Kamil Masood
- Aunts: Carly Wicks
- First cousins: Frankie Lewis; Lee Carter; Nancy Carter; Johnny Carter; Ollie Carter; Yasmin Masood
- Other relatives: Tina Carter; Stan Carter; Sylvie Carter; Babe Smith

Jade Masood (also Green), originally played by Amaya Edward, is the daughter of Shabnam Masood (Rakhee Thakrar) and Dean Wicks (Matt Di Angelo). She first appears on 12 June 2015. On 2 December 2023, it was confirmed that Jade would make a return to the show, with the role recast to Elizabeth Green. She appeared in 35 episodes between 11 December 2023 and 25 April 2024.

She was conceived during a one-night stand in 2008 and Shabnam named her Roya and gave her up for adoption. However, she was fostered, not adopted and Dean's mother, Shirley Carter (Linda Henry), tracks Jade down after being given her address by Shabnam's father, Masood Ahmed (Nitin Ganatra).

Shabnam decides she wants to be part of Jade's life, following the stillbirth of her son, Zaair Kazemi. Shabnam and her husband, Kush Kazemi (Davood Ghadami) go into a custody battle with Jade's grandparents, Shirley and her boyfriend Buster Briggs (Karl Howman). However, Shabnam decides she is not ready to raise Jade as she is still grieving for Zaair and is persuaded not to go for custody. Shirley and Buster gain custody of Jade, but after Dean is arrested for attempted rape, they give full custody to Shabnam and she and Jade leave together for a fresh start on 5 February 2016.

In 2017, Jade's uncle Mick Carter (Danny Dyer) sends her an invitation for his wife Linda Carter's (Kellie Bright) 40th birthday, but Shirley tells him that Jade and Shabnam cannot make it due to flight conflicts.

In 2023, Dean returns to Walford and reveals that Jade is in urgent need of a lung transplant due to her cystic fibrosis and may not live for much longer. Jade returns to the Square shortly after in search of Dean. At first, she rebuffs him due to his absence through much of her life. She bonds with Gina Knight (Francesca Henry) who gifts Jade her bracelet. Just as it seems that Jade and Dean are breaking ice, Linda announces that Dean raped her, which shocks Jade. She tells Dean she wants nothing to do with him and leaves.

She returns to Albert Square in January 2024, and tells Dean she does not believe Linda and is fed up of Shabnam fussing over her. Jade later befriends Davinder "Nugget" Gulati (Juhaim Rasul Choudhury) and Avani Nandra-Hart (Aaliyah James). Jade finds a confidant in Jean Slater (Gillian Wright), who helps her organise an auction for a cystic fibrosis charity. Shabnam contacts Jade asking her to move to Pakistan with her. Dean is livid when he finds out and he begins tampering with Jade's medication so she will be too ill to go. He also books them a one-way trip to New York.

At the auction, Dean secretly pulls out Jade's oxygen tube and she faints. At the hospital, Jean grows suspicious of Dean and though he tries to blame her for harming Jade, Jean tells Jade that her father is the one responsible for her poor health. Meanwhile, Dean is framed by Linda, Stacey Slater (Lacey Turner), Sharon Watts (Letitia Dean), Kathy Cotton (Gillian Taylforth), Denise Fox (Diane Parish) and Suki Panesar (Balvinder Sopal) for the murder of Keanu Taylor (Danny Walters). Jade informs the police of Dean's neglect regarding her medication. Dean later sends Jade a prison visiting order. Accompanied by Jean, Jade visits him in prison, where she tricks him into admitting that he was the one messing with her medication, thereby endangering her life. A furious Jade disowns Dean and tells him to rot in hell. After saying goodbye to Jean, Stacey, Nugget and Avani, Jade leaves to go to Pakistan with Shabnam.

Following Jade's first appearance, in which Shirley sees her using a nebuliser, it was confirmed that EastEnders were pursuing a cystic fibrosis storyline, with the Cystic Fibrosis Trust confirming they were working with producers on the storyline. Oli Lewington, Engagement Director at the Trust, said that the organisation was "delighted that an often unseen condition like cystic fibrosis is finally getting the national recognition it deserves, and we're hugely grateful to the EastEnders team for helping to make it happen."

== Rosemary Kerr ==
Dr Rosemary Kerr, played by Jessica Guise, appears in two episodes on 26 June and 8 October 2015. She treats Shabnam Masood (Rakhee Thakrar) in hospital after she is assaulted by a gang. She informs Shabnam that she is pregnant. She later treats Ian Beale (Adam Woodyatt) after he is hit by a car.

Viewers took to Twitter saying that she looks like Ian's deceased daughter Lucy Beale (Hetti Bywater).

== Gavin Sullivan ==
Gavin Sullivan, played by Paul Nicholas, is the husband of established character Kathy Sullivan (Gillian Taylforth) and biological father of Sharon Mitchell (Letitia Dean). Gavin is first mentioned by name only as Kathy's husband after Kathy's departure in 2000. He and Kathy are supposed to have died in a car accident off-screen in 2006. The couple are revealed to be alive in February 2015, Gavin making his first screen appearance on 21 August 2015. He reveals he is Sharon's father in October 2015. Gavin made an unannounced departure on 8 July 2016.

== Hazel Warren ==
Hazel Warren, played by Clare Higgins, appears in nine episodes from 15 to 29 September 2015 (episodes 5138 to 5146) as the prosecution lawyer in Max Branning's (Jake Wood) trial for the murder of Lucy Beale (Hetti Bywater) (see "Who Killed Lucy Beale?"). Hazel is successful with her prosecution of Max and he is found guilty of Lucy's murder and sentenced to life imprisonment. Of her involvement in the show, Higgins said, "I had such a great time at EastEnders. It was a privilege to be part of such an exciting storyline and work with such a fantastic group of actors."

== Louie Beale ==
Louie Beale
- EastEnders character
- Portrayed by: Oscar Winehouse (2015–2018); Freddie Harrington (2023); Jake McNally (2024–present)
- Duration: 2015–2018, 2023–present
- First appearance: Episode 5139; 17 September 2015
- Introduced by: Dominic Treadwell-Collins (2015); Chris Clenshaw (2023–2024)
In-universe information
- Family: Beale/Branning
- Father: Peter Beale
- Mother: Lauren Branning
- Brothers: Jimmy Beale
- Grandfathers: Ian Beale; Max Branning
- Grandmothers: Cindy Beale; Tanya Branning
- Uncles: Steven Beale; Bobby Beale
- Aunts: Abi Branning; Cindy Williams; Gina Knight; Anna Knight; Annie Carter
- First cousins: Abi Branning
- Other relatives: Kathy Beale; Jack Branning; Ben Mitchell; Lexi Pearce

Louie Beale first appears in the episode broadcast on 17 September 2015. He was initially played by Oscar Winehouse. He is the son of established characters Peter Beale (Ben Hardy/Thomas Law) and Lauren Branning (Jacqueline Jossa). In September 2017, Jossa and Lorna Fitzgerald's departures were announced and Louie left alongside Lauren on 16 February 2018. He made an unannounced return on 22 June 2023 alongside his mother and father and was portrayed by Freddie Harrington. On 1 January 2024, Louie returned again, now played by Jake McNally.

Lauren returns to Walford when she discovers her father Max Branning (Jake Wood) is to stand trial for Peter's twin sister Lucy Beale's (Hetti Bywater) murder (see "Who Killed Lucy Beale?"). However, before she can clear Max's name she goes into labour and she gives birth to her son in September 2015, whom she names Louie, after Peter's late great-grandmother Lou Beale (Anna Wing). Max is convicted of Lucy's murder in October 2015 so Lauren returns to New Zealand with Louie. They return to Walford in May 2016 with Peter's older half-brother Steven Beale (Aaron Sidwell), who is now in a relationship with Lauren. Lauren and Steven's relationship begins to fall apart, with Lauren growing closer to her employer, Josh Hemmings (Eddie Eyre). Lauren decides to take Louie and return to New Zealand, but she changes her mind when Steven pretends he has a brain tumour in mid 2017. Steven asks Lauren if he can adopt Louie and sees a solicitor about obtaining parental responsibility of Louie. In September 2017, Steven dies from injuries caused by Max in a fire, and Lauren starts a relationship with Josh. Lauren and Josh plan to move to Glasgow but on Christmas Day 2017, Lauren and her sister Abi Branning (Lorna Fitzgerald) fall from a roof, Lauren breaks her pelvis and needs surgery however Abi dies. After Abi's funeral, Lauren and Louie leave to live in New Zealand for a fresh start.

Five years later, Louie returns in June 2023 when he briefly visits Peter in France, Louie also meets his paternal grandmother Cindy Beale (Michelle Collins) – although Louie knew her as her alias, Rose Knight. Lauren arrives in France and Louie speaks about "Rose" until Peter changes the topic. They then go and look at Louie's den in the woods. As the day progresses, Ian ends up in hospital and Lauren walks in and meets Cindy. After feeling betrayed by Peter, Lauren takes her things and her and Louie return to New Zealand.

In November 2023, Louie and Lauren go to France to be closer to Penny Branning (Kitty Castledine), and the two stay there until New Year's Day 2024 when Lauren decides to go back to Walford with Louie, however Penny decides to go back to Walford with them and plants drugs in Lauren's bag in hopes of smuggling them into England, however Lauren's handbag is smealt by a sniffer dog and security find the drugs and Lauren is arrested. Penny later tells the police that she planted the drugs in Lauren's handbag when Peter finds out and tells her to tell the police or he will. Lauren is released and goes to see Louie, Lauren and Peter reminisce about the past and he asks her to stay for longer but Lauren says that Walford reminds her too much of Abi. Penny and Lauren later meets and Penny admits that she planted the drugs in Lauren's bag, Lauren is furious and when she discovers that Peter knew she decides to leave Walford. Just as Lauren is about to leave Walford Whitney and Sonia tell Lauren that Annie is her half sister.

After Penny and Lauren make amends Lauren decides to stay in Walford and get a flat and move in with Penny. At first Peter objects to this not wanting his son to live with someone involved with drugs but Penny is able to get Peter onside so he agrees. Peter later helps Lauren and Penny and Louie move into 29 Albert Square. Lauren and Peter realise they still have feelings for each other. Ian encourages Peter to win Lauren back, while Cindy tells Lauren to only rekindle her relationship with Peter, if she is absolutely sure they will not break up again, for Louie's sake. Uncertain, Lauren rejects Peter's attempts to romance her. Later Louie is enrolled in Walford Primary School on his way home from his first day he was disappointed they didn't do rugby his mother revealing to Whitney he is more of a rugby fan than football Peter is helping Honey, Jay and Ben prepare for London Marathon Lauren is walking with Louie who talks to his dad who says he will see him later to ask about his first day at Walford Primary School.

In 2017, Aimee Jakes from Closer Online noted how viewers wondered what had happened to Louie after Lauren and Abi went to hospital after falling from the roof.

== Sami Jackson ==
Sami Jackson
- EastEnders character
- Portrayed by: Shiven Shankar
- Duration: 2015, 2019
- First appearance: Episode 5142; 22 September 2015
- Last appearance: Episode 5937; 13 June 2019
- Introduced by: Dominic Treadwell-Collins (2015); Kate Oates (2019)
In-universe information
- Family: Jackson
- Father: Robbie Jackson
- Mother: Nita Mistry
- Half-brothers: Anish Mistry
- Grandfathers: Gary Bolton
- Grandmothers: Carol Jackson
- Uncles: Billie Jackson; Kevin Bolton
- Aunts: Bianca Jackson; Sonia Fowler
- First cousins: Liam Butcher; Tiffany Butcher; Morgan Butcher; Bex Fowler; Julia Fowler
- Other relatives: Jim Branning; Reenie Branning; Derek Branning; Max Branning; Jack Branning; Lauren Branning; Abi Branning; Oscar Branning; Amy Mitchell; Ricky Branning; Samir Mistry

Sami Jackson first appears in the episode broadcast on 22 September 2015. He is the son of Robbie Jackson (Dean Gaffney) and Nita Mistry (Bindya Solanki).

Robbie returns to Walford in 2010 to attend his sister Bianca Jackson's (Patsy Palmer) wedding to Ricky Butcher (Sid Owen) and reveals to the family that Nita is six months pregnant. Robbie returns to Mumbai after the wedding where Nita later gives birth to Sami.

Following Robbie and Nita's separation in 2015, Robbie and Sami arrives in Walford and Robbie meets with his mother Carol Jackson (Lindsey Coulson), his half-sister Sonia Fowler (Natalie Cassidy), and his niece Bex Fowler (Jasmine Armfield) and introduces them all to Sami. Carol, Robbie and Sami move to Milton Keynes near the rest of Robbie's family.

However, when Robbie returns in 2017, Sami is living with Nita in India but mentions them on occasion.

In 2019, Robbie goes to India to see Nita and Sami and brings him back to Walford for a visit. When Nita phones for Robbie to return Sami, he ignores her phone calls. Robbie's flatmate Kush Kazemi (Davood Ghadami) notices the missed calls and tries to persuade Robbie to do the right thing but to no avail. Nita arrives in Walford and Robbie barricades himself and Sami inside the flat. Nita threatens to call the police but Sonia persuades her not to. Robbie eventually unlocks the door and returns Sami to Nita and allows Robbie to say goodbye to Sami before they leave for India. Several months later, Sami is injured in an accident and Robbie flies to India to see him.

== Wellard II ==
Wellard II
- EastEnders character
- Portrayed by: Panther
- Appears in: Episode 5148; 2 October 2015
- Introduced by: Dominic Treadwell-Collins
- Species: Dog
- Breed: Belgian Tervuren
In-universe information
- Owners: Robbie Jackson; Sami Jackson

Wellard II (or Wellard 2), played by Panther, is a Belgian Tervuren who Robbie Jackson (Dean Gaffney) gets for his young son, Sami Jackson, as Robbie never got over the death of the original Wellard. Wellard II made his first appearance in September 2015 during Robbie's guest return. Speaking of Wellard II, Gaffney said "Robbie and Wellard were inseparable, so it only seems right that there will be a Wellard 2. I think viewers are going to love him!" In an interview with Good Morning Britain, Gaffney revealed that Panther is the same breed as the dog who played the original Wellard, and said he is from the same family, possibly the grandson.

When Robbie returns to Walford in 2015, he intends to get a dog and name it after Wellard. On the day that Robbie and Sami are due to leave, they are disappointed when some puppies were sold, but Carol surprises them with a dog. Sami asks what he is called and Robbie reveals his name, Wellard II.

When Robbie returns in 2017 and has to live with Dot Branning (June Brown), she has doubts due to the dog but Sonia Fowler (Natalie Cassidy) says that Robbie has lost the dog but does not say if this means Wellard II has died, if he ran away or if he is living with Sami.

== Jason Adams ==
Jason Adams
- EastEnders character
- Portrayed by: Scott Neal
- First appearance: Episode 5148; 2 October 2015
- Last appearance: Episode 5151; 8 October 2015
- Introduced by: Dominic Treadwell-Collins

Jason Adams, played by Scott Neal, is the toyboy lover of Elaine Peacock (Maria Friedman). The character was confirmed on 3 September 2015 when executive producer Dominic Treadwell-Collins teased an upcoming storyline, saying "We've got some rare fun for the Carters as Maria Friedman returns for a three-month stint with Scott Neal in tow as her toy boy lover. All of which will add a little bit of fun for Mick (Danny Dyer) and Linda (Kellie Bright) in the pub." A show insider said "The Carters are shocked when Elaine returns home from holiday with Jase. He's certainly put a smile on her face, but is he all that he seems?"

Jason arrives with Elaine at The Queen Victoria pub, surprising her daughter Linda and her family, when Elaine announces that she and Jason are engaged. Mick's great-aunt, Babe Smith (Annette Badland), and Linda initially are cautious about trusting Jason. Linda's distrust of him grows when she catches Babe having a passionate encounter with Jason in the kitchen. Linda asks Babe to get Jason to leave or she will tell Elaine. When Elaine jokes about Jason having a crush on Babe, Babe snaps and tells her the truth, but Elaine does not believe this and accuses her of being jealous. When Babe tells Jason that Linda wants him to leave, he says he really likes her. Realising Babe has money, he says he wants to move away with her, but when she says it will take time to get the money, he suggests that they steal from the pub. Babe secretly records this and plays the recording in front of him, Elaine and everyone in the pub. Elaine then slaps Babe and Mick orders Jason to leave. After Babe explains herself to Elaine and Linda, Jason arrives for his belongings, leaving the three women shocked as to how remorseless he is for hurting the family, so Linda throws him out and sends his belongings to charity.

== Kyle Slater ==
Kyle Slater, played by Riley Carter Millington, is Stacey Branning's (Lacey Turner) half-brother. He made his first appearance on 30 October 2015 and left on 25 November 2016. EastEnders executive producer Dominic Treadwell-Collins had previously announced in February of that year that he wanted to cast a transgender actor to play a transgender character on the soap. Kyle was introduced as the transgender half-brother of Stacey Slater (Lacey Turner). Kyle's arrival in the show was nominated for the "media moment" award at the 2016 British LGBT Awards.

== Arthur Fowler ==
Arthur Fowler
- EastEnders character
- Portrayed by: Various (2015–2016); Hunter Bell (2016–2022); Rocco Brenner (2022–2025)
- Duration: 2015–2025
- First appearance: Episode 5196; 24 December 2015
- Last appearance: Episode 7200; 2 October 2025
- Introduced by: Dominic Treadwell-Collins
In-universe information
- Family: Slater/Fowler
- Father: Kush Kazemi
- Mother: Stacey Slater
- Adoptive father: Martin Fowler
- Stepmother: Eve Unwin
- Half-brothers: Zaair Kazemi; Roman Fowler (adoptive)
- Half-sisters: Lily Slater; Hope Fowler; Bex Fowler (adoptive)
- Grandfathers: Umar Kazemi; Brian Slater
- Grandmothers: Carmel Kazemi; Jean Slater
- Uncles: Sean Slater; Shakil Kazemi; Darius Kazemi; Kyle Slater
- Nieces: Charli Slater
- Other relatives: Charlie Slater; Kat Slater; Belinda Peacock; Zoe Slater; Hayley Slater; Freddie Slater; Tommy Moon; Bert Moon; Ernie Moon; Cherry Slater

Arthur Fowler is the son of established characters Stacey Slater (Lacey Turner) and Kush Kazemi (Davood Ghadami), and the adoptive son of Martin Fowler (James Bye). His first appearance is in the episode broadcast on 24 December 2015, in which his birth is depicted. It was revealed in a behind the scenes documentary, Stacey Branning – On the Edge, that 16 babies were licensed to play Arthur for filming of Stacey's illness storyline, due to legal boundaries. From 2016 until 2022, Arthur was played by Hunter Bell. The character of Arthur was portrayed by Rocco Brenner his first scenes aired on 21 March 2022.

Arthur is the result of a one-night stand between Stacey and Kush, before she starts dating Martin, and while Kush is on a break from his relationship with Shabnam Masood (Rakhee Thakrar). When Stacey finds out that she is pregnant, she tells Martin that he is the father but hides her baby scans from him. She later admits to her best friend, Shabnam, that Martin is not the father. On Shabnam and Kush's wedding day, Kush confronts Stacey and she tells him that she believes he could be the father. Arthur is born at Stacey's daughter, Lily Slater's (Aine Garvey) nativity play.

Martin names the baby after his father, Arthur Fowler (Bill Treacher), and Stacey's father, Brian Slater. After noticing how Kush is with Arthur, Shabnam asks Stacey if he is the father, but Stacey denies this. Stacey starts to fear for Arthur's safety, believing him to be the son of God, and climbs onto the roof of The Queen Victoria public house with Arthur, where she believes they are closer to God. Martin talks her down and she is hospitalised and diagnosed with postpartum psychosis. Arthur is left in Martin's care, though he regularly takes him to visit her. Due to stress of looking after Arthur and Lily and trying to find Stacey a place at a mother and baby unit, Martin crashes his van with Arthur in the vehicle. Arthur is unharmed. Martin finds a mother and baby unit, so Arthur moves in there to be with Stacey. Martin discovers that Kush is Arthur's father from a letter Stacey wrote, so leaves for America. When he returns, he publicly reveals that Kush is Arthur's father. During a home visit, Stacey tells Kush he can be involved in Arthur's life, but Kush realises he is a bad role model and decides that Arthur is better off without him.

Stacey and Martin decide to keep their distance from the Kazemis following Arthur's adoptive half-sister, Bex Fowler (Jasmine Armfield), being bullied. Arthur's paternal grandmother, Carmel Kazemi (Bonnie Langford), is hurt with being excluded from Arthur's life and Stacey and Carmel fight when Carmel makes remarks about Stacey's mental health. However, Max Branning (Jake Wood), Stacey's former father-in-law, persuades Stacey to let Carmel be involved with Arthur. Stacey allows Kush to look after Arthur, and Martin and Kush make up with each other. Kush is delighted when Martin tells him that he can look after Arthur for a night each week. When Kush suffers a cardiac arrest, he is diagnosed with Brugada Syndrome, which is hereditary. Stacey worries that Arthur could die and tells Bex about the possibility of Arthur having the syndrome. A doctor assures Stacey that the chance of Arthur displaying symptoms at a young age is small. Arthur undergoes an ECG and Stacey, Kush and Martin are told by the specialist that Arthur is at high risk at having the condition, but cannot have an operation or tests like Kush due to his age. Stacey is anxious that Arthur having a cardiac arrest is a sign of the condition and his parents are told about equipment that is not available on the NHS. Stacey is angry with Martin that he asked Kush for money to buy the equipment. Stacey and Martin panic when Arthur will not wake up, and when they receive Arthur's medical records at the hospital, Stacey and Martin are told that Arthur has swallowed Stacey's bipolar medication. Carmel is horrified when she finds bruises on Arthur's arms, and expresses her concerns to Kush that Stacey is unwell, while Stacey tells Michelle Fowler (Jenna Russell) that he gained the bruises in hospital. However, Lily tells Carmel that Stacey was responsible, so Carmel reports it to social services, but tries to retract what she said after realising it was a mistake. Social services visit Stacey and Martin and tell them they received a report about Arthur. Arthur and Lily are placed in Carmel's care until social services have investigated. Arthur is looked over by a doctor, who has no concerns and Stacey and Martin can have Arthur and Lily back. Social worker Fiona Payne (Sandra James-Young) tells Stacey and Martin she will be conducting further home visits.

After Stacey cheats on Martin with Max, Stacey leaves Walford with Arthur, Lily and his half-sister, Hope Fowler. Stacey returns a few weeks later and when Stacey is out, Martin accuses her of being with Max, so Stacey decides Martin should leave; he is hurt Stacey does not regard Arthur and Lily as his children, but he angrily throws her out and exposes her affair. Martin keeps the children inside, away from Stacey, though the pair support each other briefly when Lily holds Hope by the upstairs window, asking for Stacey. Martin rejects Stacey when she says the children need her and he decides he will not let Stacey near the children. Martin decides to go for custody and when Kush and Carmel find out, Carmel wants Kush to get custody of Arthur, but Kush attempts to get them to resolve their problems. Martin sees Stacey, offering her contact, but Stacey contacts Lily's biological father, Ryan Malloy (Neil McDermott), to help her and a locksmith changes the locks, devastating Martin. An unknown relative of Arthur's, Hayley Slater (Katie Jarvis), distracts Martin when he is looking after Hope and after finding out who she is, Stacey contacts Hayley again and when Martin is looking after Hope and Arthur, Hayley encourages Martin to take the children to a stay and play, buy them some tea and eat ice cream, disobeying Stacey's instructions. Hayley pretends to defend Martin in front of Stacey when she collects Arthur and Hope with police presence due to Martin not returning them.

== Other characters ==
Character	Date(s)	Actor	Circumstances
Dr Margaret Badini	1 January – 24 April (12 episodes)	Kim Vithana	A doctor who treats Ronnie Mitchell (Samantha Womack) after she is injured in a car accident. Dr Badini successfully delivers Ronnie's baby, but Ronnie goes into cardiac arrest. Dr Badini successfully resuscitates her and she is placed in a medically induced coma. Dr Badini then informs Ronnie's sister Roxy Mitchell (Rita Simons) that she and her team will try to bring Ronnie out of the coma, but she may have suffered brain damage. The procedure is initially unsuccessful. But Dr Badini tries again and Ronnie eventually breathes on her own. Dr Badini continues to treat Ronnie for the remainder of her stay in hospital as she recovers.
Dr Gary McLaughlin	2 January 2015– 19 July 2016 (3 episodes)	Duncan Casey	A doctor who treats Emma Summerhayes (Anna Acton) in hospital after she is struck by Roxy Mitchell's (Rita Simons) car. He later informs Emma's partner Max Branning (Jake Wood) of her death. He appears again when Phil Mitchell (Steve McFadden), Ian Beale (Adam Woodyatt), and Steven Beale (Aaron Sidwell) arrive at the hospital after discovering that Ben Mitchell (Harry Reid) has been injured in a fight. Dr McLaughlin informs Ian and Phil that Ben has died of his injuries. When Phil and Ian identify the body and discover that it is actually Paul Coker (Jonny Labey) who has died, McLaughlin apologises to them for his mistake.
Stuart Webb	9 January	Jack Daw	A man with whom Kat Moon (Jessie Wallace) has a one-night stand. Stacey Branning (Lacey Turner) catches him leaving Kat's bedroom the following day.
Velma Celli	16 January	Ian Stroughair	A drag queen who Shirley Carter (Linda Henry) hires to perform at The Queen Victoria public house's karaoke night. He flirts with Tamwar Masood (Himesh Patel) and sits on his lap whilst singing. He also invites Fatboy (Ricky Norwood) up onto the stage to sing with him.
PC Julian Walsh	20 January 2015– 18 August 2017 (4 episodes)	Luke Williams	A police officer who investigates Linda Carter's (Kellie Bright) rape by Dean Wicks (Matt Di Angelo) and takes her initial statement. He later arrests Bobby Beale (Eliot Carrington) for assaulting his adoptive mother Jane Beale (Laurie Brett). He is then present when Mick Carter (Danny Dyer), Shirley Carter (Linda Henry) and Babe Smith (Annette Badland) are arrested for breaching their pub licence and sits in on their interviews. Walsh also arrests Vincent Hubbard (Richard Blackwood) on suspicion of dealing drugs.
PC/DC Vanessa Jenkins	20 January 2015– 26 April 2016 (6 episodes)	Caroline Faber	A police officer who investigates Linda Carter's (Kellie Bright) sexual assault claim against Dean Wicks (Matt Di Angelo). She interviews Linda and takes her phone for evidence. Jenkins later informs Linda that Dean had been arrested and questioned but released on bail as there was not enough evidence to charge him. Mick Carter (Danny Dyer) angrily tells Jenkins that she is not doing her job properly and orders her out of the pub. Jenkins returns and informs Linda that Dean has been remanded in custody after assaulting a police officer. Jenkins visits Linda again and informs her and Mick that the charges against Dean have been dropped as there is not enough evidence to prosecute him. She also returns Linda's phone to her. She later questions Louise Mitchell (Tilly Keeper) about Jay Brown (Jamie Borthwick) after he is discovered to be in a relationship with 14-year-old Linzi Bragg (Amy-Leigh Hickman).
DC/DI Stephan Franklin	20 January 2015–13 April 2018 (4 episodes)	Tim Dantay	A police officer in charge of the investigation of Linda Carter's (Kellie Bright) allegation of rape against Dean Wicks (Matt Di Angelo). He arrests Dean on suspicion of sexual assault and questions him but is forced to release him on bail due to a lack of evidence. Three years later, Vincent Hubbard (Richard Blackwood), a former police informer, contacts Franklin saying he has information about a robbery in exchange for money. Franklin tells him that no crime was reported but asks him to find evidence that Phil Mitchell (Steve McFadden) murdered Luke Browning (Adam Astill).
Katie McCoy	30 January	Linda Armstrong	A duty solicitor, who represents Dean Wicks (Matt Di Angelo) when he is arrested and questioned on suspicion of sexual assault.
Nerys	3 March	Rhiannon Handy	A woman in charge of the nursery that Kat Moon (Jessie Wallace) sends her sons, Tommy, Bert and Ernie to. She has an argument with Kat after asking her to take Tommy home after he is sick.
Clinton Makepeace	5–6 March (2 episodes)	Nick Korsa	A man driving a car that Kim Fox-Hubbard (Tameka Empson) hides from, thinking that her estranged husband Vincent Hubbard (Richard Blackwood) has found her. Later, it is revealed during a phone call he makes, that he is actually looking for Kat Moon (Jessie Wallace). When he visits her the next day, she initially mistakes him for a social worker until he reveals that he is a private investigator who is working on a compensation case against Kat's uncle Harry Slater (Michael Elphick), who had raped four other women. Kat is too agitated to hear any more and orders him to leave. He leaves a card with his contact details in case Kat changes her mind.
Hilary Taylor	6 March 2015– 15 November 2018 (9 episodes)	Sadie Shimmin	A social worker who comes to visit Kat Moon (Jessie Wallace) after Linda Carter's (Kellie Bright) accidental telephone call about Kat's irresponsibility is processed. She receives directions to Kat's flat through Pam Coker (Lin Blakley), who is revealed to be an old friend of hers who often baked biscuits at her workplace. She leaves after Linda arrives to clear up the misunderstanding, and assures Kat that she and Tommy have a strong parental bond. Hilary later visits Ian (Adam Woodyatt) and Jane Beale (Laurie Brett) when they want to adopt Beth Williams. When Hilary visits again, Beth's mother Cindy Williams (Mimi Keene) says that she wants Beth to be adopted by a different family and asks Hilary to take Beth away. Hilary tells Cindy that Ian and Jane have a good case for adoption. Hilary is seen again when she visits Denise Fox (Diane Parish) and reveals that she has tracked down JJ Johnson's (Zayden Kareem) mother Amelle Ellington (Sophia Brown), who Denise believed to be dead. The following week Hilary brings Amelle to Denise's house to visit JJ, and attempts to arrange for Amelle to have regular access visits but Denise gives JJ to them and tells Hilary that she wants JJ to live with Amelle permanently and they leave together. Hilary visits a pregnant Hayley Slater (Katie Jarvis) after she contemplates suicide. Hilary initially receives a negative reception from Hayley until Hilary tells her about her own upbringing in care as well as reassuring her. Hilary visits Hayley in hospital after her baby daughter is born and again when the baby is taken to hospital as she is concerned about Hayley's abilities as a parent but is assured. She visits Hayley again after Hayley nearly sold her baby but Hayley asks for another chance.
Frances Kane	12 March	Penny Layden	A counsellor who visits Carol Jackson (Lindsey Coulson) when her daughter Sonia Fowler (Natalie Cassidy) calls her and explains that Carol has been acting out of character. When Carol states that she does not want to talk to somebody who doesn't understand what it is like to go through cancer, Frances explains that she was in Carol's position and had to have a double mastectomy, just like Carol. Afterwards, Frances and Carol get on well and Carol goes to The Queen Victoria public house with Frances and confides in her, how she is feeling and her fears that the cancer may return. Frances then invites Carol to join her weekly counselling group sessions.
Linzi Gallo	26 March	Jade Colucci	A woman who accuses Ineta Shirovs (Gledisa Osmani) of bullying her daughter, Theia, at school. Roxy Mitchell (Rita Simons) defends Ineta and punches Linzi in the face.
Irene Daniels	10 April	Lorna Gayle	A nurse at a hospice that Stan Carter (Timothy West) is admitted to when his prostate cancer becomes critical. She attempts to calm Stan's daughters Shirley (Linda Henry) and Tina (Luisa Bradshaw-White), his grandson Mick (Danny Dyer) and his fiancée Cora Cross (Ann Mitchell) when Stan begins to suffer with terminal agitation and she increases his morphine dose to make the final hours of his life as comfortable as possible.
Ginger Pete	20–21 April	John Merit (uncredited)	An old colleague of Stan Carter (Timothy West), who attends his funeral.
Gareth Hunt	27 April – 4 May (3 episodes)	Ojan Genc	A man who throws a brick through the window of Dean Wicks' (Matt Di Angelo) salon, with a piece of paper saying "rapist" attached to it. Dean's father, Buster Briggs (Karl Howman), chases Gareth down the street but loses him. It is later revealed that Dean's great aunt, Babe Smith (Annette Badland), had hired Gareth to throw the brick and he later meets up with her to collect his money. The following week, Buster encounters Gareth again on the street and he runs off when Buster recognises him. Buster chases him and catches up with him, pinning him to a wall and a frightened Gareth tells him about Babe's involvement in the brick throwing and that she had paid him to do it.
McManus	30 April	Matthew Wynn	A private detective hired by Phil Mitchell (Steve McFadden) to track down Sharon Mitchell's (Letitia Dean) birth father.
Sister Judith	30 April 2015– 5 January 2016 (5 episodes)	Sandy McDade	A nun at a care home for nuns that had previously been the nunnery where Kat Moon (Jessie Wallace) gave birth to her daughter Zoe Slater (Michelle Ryan) 31 years previously. Sister Judith opens the door to Kat, who wants closure as Zoe was the product of rape by her uncle Harry Slater (Michael Elphick). Judith introduces her to Sister Ruth (June Whitfield), who was present at the birth and remembers it in detail. After Kat leaves, Judith and Ruth look at the birth record, seeing that Kat gave birth to twins, Zoe and a boy. Sister Judith comes to Walford soon after looking for Kat, but leaves without speaking to her when she sees how happy Kat is. When Kat returns from Spain after winning the lottery, she agrees to make a charitable donation to the convent. Judith arrives in Walford and finds Kat at The Queen Victoria public house where Kat gives her a cheque, and Judith says Ruth could not come as she is unwell. Judith meets Stacey Branning's (Lacey Turner) son Arthur Fowler and calls him "an angel", telling Stacey to look after him.
Nurse Nina Barrett	4 May 2015– 8 September 2017 (4 episodes)	Sarah Hoare	A nurse who treats Ronnie Mitchell (Samantha Womack) in hospital. When Vincent Hubbard (Richard Blackwood) tries to kiss Ronnie, she presses her alarm and Nina comes rushing in, but Ronnie tells her that it was a false alarm. Lauren Branning (Jacqueline Jossa) later goes for a termination and Nina gives her the pills to do so. Lauren comes back the following day with her sister Abi Branning (Lorna Fitzgerald) for the second set of pills, and Nina calls Lauren in. Three months later, Nina treats Abi and Steven Beale (Aaron Sidwell) after they are injured in a fire that Steven started at his family's restaurant. Steven goes into cardiac arrest, and despite Nina's best efforts to save him, he dies of his injuries.
Helen Stritch QC	8–18 May (4 episodes)	Jaye Griffiths	The prosecution lawyer in Dot Branning's (June Brown) trial for the murder of her son, Nick Cotton (John Altman). Despite Helen's best efforts Dot is acquitted of murder but is convicted of manslaughter.
Adrian Quinlan QC	8–18 May (4 episodes)	Ben Turner	The defence lawyer in Dot Branning's (June Brown) murder trial. Adrian successfully defends Dot and she is acquitted of murder and convicted of manslaughter.
Judge St. John Redmond	8–18 May (4 episodes)	William Gaunt	The judge in Dot Branning's (June Brown) murder trial. After Dot is convicted of manslaughter, he sentences her to fourteen months imprisonment.
Midwife Jenni	12 May	Golda Rosheuvel	The midwife who delivers Linda Carter's (Kellie Bright) baby.
Nurse Esther	14–15 May (2 episodes)	Esther Mcauley	The nurse who looks after Linda Carter (Kellie Bright) and her newborn baby in the premature baby ward. She is quick to respond when Linda's rapist, Dean Wicks (Matt Di Angelo), turns up demanding to see the baby, and informs security to not let him anywhere near the building. She also urges Linda's partner, Mick Carter (Danny Dyer), to have a DNA test to establish if he is the baby's father.
Asim Hussain	15–25 May (4 episodes)	Nitin Kundra	A man introduced to Shabnam Masood (Rakhee Thakrar), by her aunt, Fatima Inzamam (Anu Hasan) as a suitor for an arranged marriage. Asim is a vet and he and Shabnam get on well until he mentions the possibility of having children, which Shabnam reacts badly to. Asim apologises for upsetting her but Shabnam tells him that she is not ready to get married. However, Shabnam later surprises her family and Asim by agreeing to marry him. Shabnam's on-off boyfriend Kush Kazemi (Davood Ghadami) then proposes to her and she accepts, so Asim calls off the engagement and leaves.
Dr Rupesh Dhiri	19 May	Amerjit Deu	A doctor who gives medical examinations to Alfie (Shane Richie) and Kat Moon (Jessie Wallace) when they arrange to move to Spain. Alfie tries to find out from the doctor if Kat passed, but he refuses to say due to patient confidentiality. He later rings Alfie and tells him to come back to the clinic as he has had an abnormal test result.
Dr Hazel Blake	21 May	Karen Ascoe	A doctor who Alfie Moon (Shane Richie) visits when he has abnormal results from a medical examination. She informs Alfie that he could have a brain tumour, and arranges for him to undergo an MRI scan. The scan confirms that Alfie has a suspicious mass on his brain and Dr Blake tells him he will need further tests.
DC Jim Glover	25 May 2015– 15 September 2017 (6 episodes)	Justin Pierre	A police officer who arrests Vincent Hubbard (Richard Blackwood) on suspicion of assault. He questions Vincent over a drug dealer who was due to attend court to testify against Dot Branning (June Brown) but was badly beaten and could not go as a result. Glover insists he knows Vincent was responsible for the attack, but has to release him due to a lack of evidence. He then arrests Mick Carter (Danny Dyer), Shirley Carter (Linda Henry) and Babe Smith (Annette Badland) for breaching the licence of The Queen Victoria public house and interviews them. He appears again one month later when Shirley changes her statement and tells him that she knew about Babe serving alcohol in the morning. Shirley is subsequently sentenced to three months in prison for perverting the course of justice. Glover appears again six months later when he investigates Johnny Carter's (Ted Reilly) shooting. Later in the week, he arrests Ted (Christopher Timothy) and Joyce Murray (Maggie Steed) for the shooting and also charges them with illegal possession of a firearm.
Gordon Cook	1–4 June (3 episodes)	Stephen Marcus	A man who Phil Mitchell (Steve McFadden) pays to pretend to be Sharon Mitchell's (Letitia Dean) father. Phil brings Sharon to see Gordon, and they see that he lives in a run-down flat, and witness him shouting at a group of children, putting Sharon off speaking to him. However, she changes her mind and later visits him alone, and Gordon is forced to reveal he is not her father and Phil has paid him. Sharon offers him more money to double-bluff Phil to get him to reveal the truth. Sharon invites Gordon to stay with them, and Phil tries to get him to leave. When Sharon gives Gordon money to renovate his home, Phil later takes it from him. Sharon then invites Phil's son Ben Mitchell (Harry Reid) to talk to Gordon about Ben's mother Kathy Sullivan (Gillian Taylforth), forcing Phil to admit the truth. Sharon orders Phil to repay Gordon, who calls the Mitchells "twisted" and leaves.
Richard Day	2 June 2015– 20 April 2017 (2 episodes)	David Broughton-Davies	Abi Branning's (Lorna Fitzgerald) boss. She meets him at the local restaurant with her boyfriend Ben Mitchell (Harry Reid). Ben talks to Richard to distract himself from Paul Coker (Jonny Labey), who is sitting nearby. Two years later, Richard tells the Carter family that their dog, Lady Di (Hot Lips) has pneumonia and will need an operation that will cost around £6,000 to £8,000.
Jez, Fiona and Kate	2 June	Uncredited	Abi Branning's (Lorna Fitzgerald) colleagues. She meets them along with her boss Richard Day (David Broughton-Davies) at the local restaurant with her boyfriend Ben Mitchell (Harry Reid).
Jonathan Malnet	11–26 June (5 episodes)	James Barriscale	Jade Green's (Amaya Edward) foster father. When Jade's maternal grandfather Masood Ahmed (Nitin Ganatra) attempts to visit Jade, he sees Jonathan with another girl. The following day, Jonathan is visited by Jade's paternal grandmother, Shirley Carter (Linda Henry), who discovers Jade has cystic fibrosis. Shirley later brings her son and Jade's father Dean Wicks (Matt Di Angelo) to see Jade but Jonathan tells them they should go through social services. Shirley then offers Jonathan cash so they can do a DNA test to prove Dean is Jade's father, and Jonathan accepts. Jonathan later meets up with Shirley and Buster Briggs (Karl Howman), Jade's paternal grandfather, and arranges for them to meet Jade. Later in the week, Jonathan brings Jade to see Dean and Shirley. He reads a newspaper whilst they play a game with her. Jade runs away during the visit and Jonathan is warned by Jade's uncle Mick Carter (Danny Dyer), who had found Jade, not to trust Dean with her. Jonathan is unimpressed with Shirley and Dean and refuses to allow them any further access to Jade. Off-screen, Jonathan's wife leaves him and he neglects to take care for his foster children and Jade is put with another foster family, until Shirley and Buster gain custody of her.
Seamus	30 June	Uncredited	A customer in Dean Wicks's (Matt Di Angelo) salon, Blades.
Sgt Major Adam Wallace	9 July – 4 September (4 episodes)	Jamie Maclachlan	Lee Carter's (Danny-Boy Hatchard) commanding officer who comes looking for Lee when he fails to show up for work at the army recruitment centre. He questions Lee's mother Linda Carter (Kellie Bright) and sister Nancy Carter (Maddy Hill) over his whereabouts. Lee later bumps into Wallace at the tube station and apologises for his absences. Wallace tells Lee he can tell something is wrong with him and advises him to get professional help. Wallace later returns to remind Lee that he has a meeting with his commanding officer, but Lee does not attend and ignores Wallace's calls. Wallace finds Lee in the café and tells him that he could face disciplinary proceedings if he fails to show up for the meeting. Wallace is later present at the army base when Lee arrives for the meeting with his girlfriend Whitney Dean (Shona McGarty) who tells Wallace that Lee wants to return to active service. Wallace ushers Whitney out for part of the appointment and tries to reassure Lee. Wallace and the commanding officer then witness Lee punch Lieutenant Harry Fielding (Robbie Jarvis) and he is discharged from the army as a result.
Dr Natasha Black	10 July 2015– 4 July 2017 (10 episodes)	Rachel Bavidge	A GP who Stacey Branning (Lacey Turner) visits for a medical check-up. Stacey tells her that she is pregnant and Dr Black explains that Stacey's medication for her bipolar disorder would render any contraceptive pills ineffective. Lee Carter (Danny-Boy Hatchard) later has an appointment with her whilst suffering from depression. She takes a blood test and suggests Cognitive Behavioural Therapy and prescribes him anti-depressants. Abi Branning (Lorna Fitzgerald) and Ben Mitchell (Harry Reid) later visit her for their first antenatal checkup. When Ben asks if they can find out when the baby is due and Dr Black asks Abi when her last period was, Abi says she does not feel well, so Dr Black asks Ben to get some water. Abi tells Dr Black she does not want Ben there, so when he returns, Dr Black asks him to leave. Abi then admits she is not pregnant and Dr Black encourages her to tell Ben the truth. Sonia Fowler (Natalie Cassidy) visits Dr Black when she finds a lump in her breast. She examines Sonia and refers her for further tests in hospital. Lee visits her again with his pregnant girlfriend Whitney Dean (Shona McGarty). Dr Black takes Whitney's blood pressure and arranges for her to return for her twelve-week scan. Lee and Whitney visit her again the following week and Dr Black informs Whitney that she has chlamydia. She prescribes Whitney pills for treatment and asks her and Lee if they have had any other sexual partners to inform them, which they deny. Denise Fox (Diane Parish) then visits her after discovering she is pregnant. Dr Black examines Denise and reveals that she is nineteen weeks gone, causing Denise to realise that Phil Mitchell (Steve McFadden) is the father of her baby. Ian Beale (Adam Woodyatt) visits her for the results of his check-up. She tells him that he is at risk of getting Type 2 diabetes. Ian is relieved as he believed he had cancer, but Dr Black warns him that he needs to take the situation seriously. When Ian returns to see Dr Black get test results, they show that he has crossed the threshold for diabetes, despite making lifestyle changes. Karen Taylor (Lorraine Stanley) takes her daughter Bernadette Taylor (Clair Norris) to see Dr Black when Karen figures out Bernadette is pregnant. Dr Black confirms the pregnancy and asks Bernadette if the sex was consensual. Bernadette refuses to name the father and she informs Karen and Bernadette she has to inform social services due to Bernadette being underage.
Muriel Rhodes	13 July	Morag Siller	A woman running a prenatal class, attended by Shabnam Masood (Rakhee Thakrar) and Stacey Branning (Lacey Turner), acting as her birthing partner. Muriel assumes they are a lesbian couple.
Simon Cray	13 July	Adam Slynn	Two men that Cindy Williams (Mimi Keene) meets in The Albert bar. She asks them to buy her a drink, and then they take her to their car. She thinks they are going to another bar, but they pull up and Simon starts drinking in the vehicle after Glen gives him a bottle of vodka. Cindy tells Simon that she wants to leave, but he replies that the party is just about to start. Later, Cindy tells Jane Beale (Laurie Brett) that she got away from them by crying and claiming she would be late for her school prom.
Glen	13 July	Uncredited	
Jamil Choudry	27 July – 3 August (3 episodes)	Neil D'Souza	Max Branning's (Jake Wood) duty solicitor, when he is arrested for the murder of Lucy Beale (Hetti Bywater) (see "Who Killed Lucy Beale?"). He sits in on Max's police interviews and visits him in prison, where he brings the wrong file, which he drops. Max is unimpressed and sacks Jamil.
Magistrate Beryl Todd	28 July 2015– 23 February 2017 (2 episodes)	Mary Ryder	A magistrate who tells Max Branning (Jake Wood) that he will not be granted bail and will be committed to Crown Court to stand trial for Lucy Beale's (Hetti Bywater) murder. She appears again when Denise Fox (Diane Parish) is charged for assaulting Keegan Baker (Zack Morris). She orders Denise to pay £200 for the assault.
Sarah Cutler	21 August – 23 December (2 episodes)	Vanessa Bailey	A midwife who tells Stacey Branning (Lacey Turner) what her options are regarding taking her bipolar medication during her pregnancy. She later visits Stacey at home to monitor her progress. Stacey argues with her boyfriend Martin Fowler (James Bye) in front of her and tells him to get Sarah a cup of tea and biscuits.
Floella Wilson	24 August	Mariam Haque	A nurse who performs a baby scan on Stacey Branning (Lacey Turner).
Dickie Ticker	25 August – 28 December (3 episodes)	Geoff McGivern	A comedian booked by Mick Carter (Danny Dyer) for Kush Kazemi's (Davood Ghadami) stag party. Dickie gets drunk and rants about his wife, and eventually Mick sends him home. Dickie returns for Mick's stag party, where he continues to moan about married life, but then flirts with Saucy Lil, who is entertaining at the party.
Dr Nicholas Forbes	28 August	Gary MacKay	A doctor who confirms that Shabnam Masood's (Rakhee Thakrar) baby has died in the womb and will be stillborn.
Daljit Singh	1 September	Ranjit Singh Shubh	A man who lives in Babe Smith's (Annette Badland) old house and tells her family she has moved to Ramsgate.
Lieutenant Harry Fielding	4 September	Robbie Jarvis	Lee Carter's (Danny-Boy Hatchard) former commanding officer, who flirts with Lee's girlfriend Whitney Dean (Shona McGarty). After Fielding goads him, Lee punches him and is thrown out of the army as a result.
Judge Anthony Abego	15 September 2015– 7 October 2016 (11 episodes)	Jeffery Kissoon	The judge presiding over Max Branning's (Jake Wood) trial for the murder of Lucy Beale (Hetti Bywater) (see "Who Killed Lucy Beale?"). He sentences Max to life imprisonment, off screen after he is found guilty of murder. Abego appears again at a bail hearing for Paul Coker's (Jonny Labey) killers. He denies bail for the suspects and orders them to be remanded in custody to await trial. Abego appears again at the gang's plea hearing when they admit the charges against them.
Thomas	18 September	Uncredited	A window cleaner who visits Dot Branning (June Brown) at her home to be paid for work he carried out.
DS Craig Pike	16 October – 11 December (4 episodes)	Charlie De'Ath	A "mystery man", who meets Vincent Hubbard (Richard Blackwood) in secret. Vincent tells him he is working with Ronnie Mitchell (Samantha Womack), to which Pike says that was not their plan, but Vincent says he has something better in mind. When Ronnie discovers Vincent is a police informant and has Vincent's folder of intelligence on the Mitchell family, Vincent calls Pike, saying they have a problem. They meet and Pike says he will deal with Ronnie if Vincent does not. Vincent then talks to Ronnie, when Pike arrives and introduces himself. He tells Ronnie that they are investigating her cousin, Phil Mitchell (Steve McFadden), and if she tells anyone, he will make sure she goes to prison for the murder of Carl White (Daniel Coonan). Vincent and Pike later meet and Vincent says they should be able to take Phil down, but Pike says they are not yet ready. When Vincent tries to have Phil arrested himself by planting a gun on him, Pike sacks Vincent as he did not stick to their plan and later attacks him in his house, witnessed by his wife Kim Fox-Hubbard (Tameka Empson), mother Claudette Hubbard (Ellen Thomas) and foster sister Donna Yates (Lisa Hammond).
PC Stuart Kent	23 October	Jamie Bannerman	A police officer who is present when Kathy Sullivan (Gillian Taylforth) and DCI Jill Marsden (Sophie Stanton) visit an address in Notting Hill, where Kathy claims Gavin Sullivan (Paul Nicholas) is holding Phil Mitchell (Steve McFadden) prisoner. Kent tells Marsden she needs to see something in the house, which turns out to be blood on the floor and wall.
Dr Michael Osoba	27 October 2015– 8 September 2017 (3 episodes)	Hainsley Lloyd Bennett	A doctor who examines Phil Mitchell (Steve McFadden) after his abduction by Gavin Sullivan (Paul Nicholas). He then treats Martin Fowler (James Bye) after he is trapped under a bus that crashes into the market and the viaduct. He tells Martin that there could be damage to his kidneys.
Dr Jo Mount	30 October 2015– 10 October 2016 (2 episodes)	Emma Davies	A doctor who treats Stacey Branning (Lacey Turner) after she suffers an electric shock at her flat. When Dr. Mount scans her unborn baby, Stacey asks her if it is a boy or a girl, but she tells her she cannot say, though confirms it is a boy by saying Stacey should go with her instinct. She later treats Whitney Dean (Shona McGarty) when she suffers a miscarriage. She tells Whitney and her fiancé Lee Carter (Danny-Boy Hatchard) that they can sign a book of remembrance for their lost baby.
Holly	30 October	Uncredited	A paramedic, who, along with her colleague, Tom Pepper, takes Stacey Branning (Lacey Turner) to hospital after she is electrocuted in her flat.
Burke	23–24 November (2 episodes)	Brett Allen	A man who arrests Ronnie Mitchell (Samantha Womack) for the murder of Carl White (Daniel Coonan), but when Ronnie is in his car, he says they are not going to a police station and she realises he is not a police officer. He later releases Ronnie miles from anywhere, and it is revealed that they are associates of Vincent Hubbard (Richard Blackwood) and he was saving her from being arrested.
Tony	24 November	Uncredited	A man who Denise Fox (Diane Parish) discovers in her house, and Denise's sister Kim Fox-Hubbard (Tameka Empson) reveals that she is looking to make cosmetic improvements to the house and Tony is measuring things, but it is later revealed that Kim plans to sell her half of the house and will restore it to two properties.
Glen	11 December	Uncredited	A foster son of Claudette Hubbard (Ellen Thomas), who attends Claudette's son Vincent Hubbard's (Richard Blackwood) birthday party.
Mr and Mrs Irvine	14 December	Uncredited	A couple who attend Les Coker's (Roger Sloman) annual Christmas party in The Queen Victoria public house.
Norman Grainger	15 December	Justin Edwards	The head of Walford Council's housing department. At the council's Christmas party at Beales' restaurant, Linda Carter (Kellie Bright) and Babe Smith (Annette Badland) lead a protest group of Walford residents to help homeless Cora Cross (Ann Mitchell) get a house. Market inspector Tamwar Masood (Himesh Patel) posts a photograph online anonymously, and shows it to Norman. With the threat that it would look like negative PR for the council, Norman is forced to give Cora a flat in Dalston.
Dr Nina Tan	21 December 2015– 6 January 2016 (2 episodes)	Wendy Kweh	A doctor who Shabnam Masood (Rakhee Thakrar) visits with her husband Kush Kazemi (Davood Ghadami) to see if her missed periods mean there will be any issues with them having another baby after the death of their son, Zaair Kazemi. After an ultrasound scan detects abnormalities in Shabnam's uterus, she recommends her to have hysteroscopy in the New Year to rule out any problems. After Shabnam has the hysteroscopy, Tan informs her that she has some scarring in her uterus, meaning that it is unlikely that she will be able to have another baby.
Dr Joe Yip	25–28 December (3 episodes)	Chike Chan	A doctor who treats Dennis Rickman (Bleu Landau) after he is left in a critical condition following a car accident. After noticing a large area of bruising on Phil Mitchell's (Steve McFadden) stomach, he recommends that he go in for a scan, and once it is done, diagnoses him with cirrhosis of the liver caused by his alcoholism. He warns him to stop drinking or else he will die, but Phil ignores him. Yip continues to urge Phil to seek treatment, but when he gives Phil a leaflet about cirrhosis, Phil bins it.
Debbie Frith	25 December 2015– 30 March 2017 (5 episodes)	Hester Ruoff	A paramedic who treats Dennis Rickman (Bleu Landau) at the scene after he is badly injured in a car crash. She later treats Les Coker (Roger Sloman) when he suffers a heart attack and takes him to hospital. She treats Martin Fowler (James Bye) after he is trapped under a bus that crashes into the market and the viaduct. Debbie attends the scene when Michelle Fowler (Jenna Russell) crashes her car into the chip shop.
Mr Colin McWerther	26 December 2015– 26 January 2017 (4 episodes)	Robert Hands	A hospital consultant who tells Sharon Mitchell (Letitia Dean) that her son Dennis Rickman (Bleu Landau) has a subdural haematoma following a car crash, and it needs an operation, after which they can assess him for possible brain damage. He later assures Sharon that Dennis has come through the operation well, but he is still sedated and cannot assess any brain damage until he is awake. He treats Whitney Carter (Shona McGarty) after she is trapped under a bus that crashes into the market and the viaduct. He tells her father-in-law Mick Carter (Danny Dyer) that she has received a blow to the head.
Saucy Lil	28 December	Lacey Bond	Mick Carter's (Danny Dyer) former girlfriend who is hired as a stripper for his stag party.
Clare Friday	29 December	Hattie Ladbury	A police civilian employee who speaks to Roxy Mitchell (Rita Simons) after she reports that Dean Wicks (Matt Di Angelo) has attempted to rape her. Roxy is photographed and examined, and then gives a statement to Clare.
