= Jan Harvey =

British actress

- Occupation: Actress
- Years active: 1973–present
- Spouse: Stephen Yardley (?–present)

Jan Harvey is a British actress. She is known for her regular television roles in Howards' Way (1985–1990), Bugs (1997–1999), and Family Affairs (2003–2005).

== Early life ==
Harvey grew up in Penzance, Cornwall. Her career began in 1970 with a theatre-in-education job attached to the York Theatre Royal. She went on to train as a teacher at the University of Cambridge, where she became involved student drama.

== Career ==
Harvey is best known as Jan Howard in the BBC television drama series Howards' Way from 1985 to 1990. The character ran a fashion boutique named Periplus. The boutique specialised in the sale of après sail wear (and was also the first UK headquarters of the German mail order franchise, Die Spitz). Subsequently, a partnership, Howard Brooke, was formed which ran multiple boutiques as well as producing its own designs. There followed the launch of an internationally renowned couture house (with attendant fragrance and cosmetics lines), the House of Howard, which was successfully floated on the stock exchange.

During the 1990s Harvey appeared in the action series Bugs, and later she was a regular cast member in the Channel 5 soap opera Family Affairs (in which she played Babs Woods). She has also guest-starred in many other high-profile British dramas, including A Touch of Frost, Inspector Morse, New Tricks and Lovejoy.

Harvey appeared in the 2010 UK tour of Calendar Girls and was due to appear in a second run of the show in late 2011.

From March 2015 to July 2016, Harvey appeared in the BBC soap opera EastEnders, as Margaret Midhurst, the family solicitor, and aunt of Sharon Watts (Letitia Dean). Her character was killed off when her on-screen brother, Gavin Sullivan (Paul Nicholas), pushed her over a balcony during a scuffle.

== Filmography ==
=== Television ===
Television
Year	Title	Role	Notes
1972	Harriet's Back in Town	Secretary	(TV Series), 2 episodes: "Episode #1.17" and "Episode #1.18"
1974	The Brothers	Briony	(TV Series), 1 episode: "Trade Wind"
1974–1981	Crown Court	Emma Lakeland (1974)/ Rosemary Davenport (1977 + 1981)	(TV Series), 9 episodes
1975	Space: 1999	Alpha News Service Girl (uncredited)	(TV Series), 1 episode: "Black Sun"
1975	Sam	Pat Barraclough	(TV Series), 11 episodes
1975	Edward the Seventh	Daisy, Princess of Pless	(TV Mini-Series), 1 episode: "Good Old Teddy!"
1975	Public Eye	Janet Frisby	(TV Series), 1 episode: "The Fatted Calf"
1975	Churchill's People	Edith	(TV Series), 1 episode: "The Saxon Dusk"
1975	Armchair Cinema	Receptionist	(TV Series), 1 episode: "When Day Is Done"
1976	Journey Through the Black Sun	Alpha News Service Girl (uncredited)	(TV Movie, compilation of Space: 1999 episodes)
1976	The Sweeney	Pat Knightly	(TV Series), 1 episode: "On the Run"
1976	Bill Brand	Woman Interviewer	(TV Series), 2 episodes: "In" and "August for the Party"
1976	Life and Death of Penelope	Elizabeth	(TV Series), 1 episode: "The Affair"
1977	Van der Valk	Margit	(TV Series), 1 episode: "In Hazard"
1978	Z Cars	Det. Sgt. Mayhew	(TV Series), 1 episode: "Prey"
1979	A Family Affair	Susan West	(TV Mini-Series), 9 episodes
1979	Rainbow	(Unnamed)	(TV Series), 1 episode,
1980	A Different Drummer	Mrs. Clemo	(TV Movie)
1981	Second Chance	Frances Sterling	(TV Series), 3 episodes:"January", "April II" and "August"
1981	Triangle	Rachael Gibson	(TV Series), 2 episodes: "Episode #1.9" and "Episode #1.10"
1981–1983	Angels	Evelyn Shaw (1981)/ Leslie Naples (1983)	(TV Series), 3 episodes: "Episode #7.26", "Episode #7.27" and "Episode #9.25"
1982	Bid for Power		(TV Series), 1 episode
1982	The World About Us	Fanny Sims	(TV Series documentary), 1 episode: "The Forgotten Voyage"
1983	The Winner	Val Stafford	(TV Movie)
1983	The Old Men at the Zoo	Harriet Leacock	(TV Series), 3 episodes: "A Tall Story", "Godmanchester's Plan" and "Exodus"
1984	Brookside	Erica Miller	(TV Series), 1 episode: "Episode #1.159"
1985	Me and My Girl	Helen	(TV Series), 1 episode: "Sam Who?"
1985	Fell Tiger	Susan Harvey	(TV Mini-Series), 6 episodes
1985–1990	Howards' Way	Jan Howard	(TV Series), 78 episodes
1987	Never Say Die	Beryl	(TV Series), 1 episode: "Episode #1.2"
1991	Inspector Morse	Friday Rees	(TV Series), 1 episode: "Greeks Bearing Gifts"
1992	Casualty	Claire	(TV Series), 1 episode: "Body Politic"
1992	Lovejoy	Mary Russell	(TV Series), 1 episode: "Benin Bronze"
1996	A Touch of Frost	Yvonne Newbiggin	(TV Series), 1 episode: "Fun Times for Swingers"
1997	Dangerfield	Nicola Gresham	(TV Series), 1 episode: "Adam"
1997	Holding On	Julie	(TV Series), 2 episodes: "Episode #1.5" and "Episode #1.6"
1997–1999	Bugs	Barbara 'Jan'	(TV Series), 20 episodes
1998	Norman Ormal: A Very Political Turtle	Barbara Vacant	(TV Movie)
1998	The Round Tower	Jane Ratcliffe	(TV serial), 1 episode
1999	Belfry Witches	Mrs. Abercrombie	(TV Series), 3 episodes: "Episode #1.1", "Episode #1.6" and "Episode #1.7"
2000	Perfect World	Isabelle Hudson	(TV Series), 1 episode: "Parents"
2001	Swallow	T. Palmer	(TV Series), 3 episodes: "Episode #1.1", "Episode #1.2" and "Episode #1.3"
2002–2003	Rockface	Dr. Jane Chamberlain	(TV Series), 13 episodes
2003	Hear the Silence	Dr. Mead	(2 Part TV Movie)
2003	The Royal	Mrs. Annette Cheriton	(TV Series), 1 episode: "Doing the Rounds"
2003	William and Mary	Mildred Summersby	(TV Series), 1 episode: "Episode #1.5"
2003–2005	Family Affairs	Babs Woods or Barbara 'Babs' Woods	(TV Series), 63 episodes
2004	The Final Quest	Annabelle	(TV Movie)
2006	Holby City	Candida Fitzgerald	(TV Series), 1 episode: "Crossing the Line"
2009	New Tricks	Miranda Carson	(TV Series), 1 episode: "Meat Is Murder"
2013	WPC 56	Helena Cole	(TV Series), 1 episode: "Nature of the Beast"
2015–2016	EastEnders	Margaret Midhurst	(TV Series), 9 episodes
