= Bleu Landau =

English actor (born 2005)

- Born: Bleu Louie Landau; 5 April 2005 (age 21); Bexley, London, England
- Occupation: Actor
- Years active: 2015–present
- Known for: Role of Dennis Rickman Jnr in EastEnders (2015–2020)

Bleu Louie Landau (born 5 April 2005) is an English actor, known for his role as Dennis Rickman Jnr in the BBC soap opera EastEnders from September 2015 to February 2020. In 2017 he appeared in Guy Richie's film King Arthur: Legend of the Sword as the role of Blue. He also appeared in Sky comedy drama Code 404 as Reece.

== Life and career ==
Bleu Louie Landau was born on 5 April 2005 in Bexley, London, in the United Kingdom and was raised on the Isle of Sheppey. In 2015, Landau replaced Harry Hickles in the role of Dennis Rickman in the BBC soap opera EastEnders. For his role, he was nominated for Best Young Performance at the 2017 British Soap Awards. The character was killed off in a boat accident aired over the 35th anniversary of EastEnders in February 2020; Landau's last scenes aired on 21 February. In 2017, he made his film debut in Guy Ritchie's film King Arthur: Legend of the Sword, he played Blue, Backlack's son. Landau is also a model, and has worked for Avon, M&S, La Petite, and River Island.

== Filmography ==
Year	Title	Role	Notes
2015–2020	EastEnders	Dennis Rickman Jnr	Recurring role
2017	King Arthur: Legend of the Sword	Blue	Film
2022	Code 404	Reece	2 episodes
2024	Grace	Young Clive Ellis	1 episode

== Awards and nominations ==
Year	Award	Category	Production	Result	Ref.
2016	Inside Soap Awards	Best Young Actor	EastEnders	Longlisted	
2017	Inside Soap Awards	Best Young Actor	EastEnders	Longlisted	
2017	The British Soap Awards	Best Young Performance	EastEnders	Nominated	
