= List of EastEnders characters introduced in 2009 =

EastEnders logo

EastEnders is a long-running BBC soap opera from the United Kingdom. This is a list of characters who first appeared on the programme during 2009, listed in order of their first appearance. They were all introduced by the show's executive producer, Diederick Santer.

== Debra Dean ==
Debra Dean
- EastEnders character
- Portrayed by: Ruth Gemmell
- First appearance: Episode 3714; 5 January 2009
- Last appearance: Episode 3829; 24 July 2009
- Introduced by: Diederick Santer
In-universe information
- Occupation: Waitress
- Husband: Nathan Dean (backstory)
- Sons: Ryan Malloy
- Daughters: Whitney Dean
- Granddaughters: Lily Slater; Dolly Dean-Hudson
- Other relatives: Charli Slater

Debra Dean, played by actress Ruth Gemmell, first appears on 5 January 2009. She is the mother of established character Whitney Dean (Shona McGarty), who she left along with Whitney's father, Nathan Dean, when Whitney was very young. Debra kept in touch with Nathan and his partner Bianca Jackson (Patsy Palmer) so Nathan and Bianca could keep her informed about Whitney. Debra is known to have worn a crucifix, which she gave to Whitney before she left. She also gave Whitney a porcelain doll that was broken by Whitney's sister, Tiffany Dean (Maisie Smith).

Debra is first mentioned in late December 2008 when Whitney decides to get in touch, only to discover Debra has not received the letter as Bianca gave her the wrong address. She claims not to have the right address when Whitney asks for it, wanting to protect her, but Janine Butcher (Charlie Brooks) discovers Bianca is lying and steals it from Bianca's address book, and gives it to Whitney.

Debra and Whitney meet on 5 January at a café where Debra works. Whitney tries to discuss when they had lived together but Debra is not interested. She shows no interest in Whitney, coldly rejecting her, upsetting Whitney so much that she breaks down in tears just after she leaves the café. She goes home and tells Bianca that she is her mother as Whitney felt visiting her birth mother was the biggest mistake she has made.

Whitney does not have any further contact with Debra until 5 June when she arrives unexpectedly. Bianca sends her away but Debra returns a few days later, insisting she wants to get to know her daughter. Bianca tells Ricky Butcher (Sid Owen) that Debra is not to be trusted and on Whitney's first birthday, she went on holiday with friends instead of being there for her daughter. Debra takes Whitney out for lunch at The Queen Victoria public house, where they start to bond, and Debra confesses that she is homeless. As a result, Whitney asks Bianca to let her stay with them. Whitney helps her sell some counterfeit DVDs. Their bond grows stronger and she surprises Whitney with her plan to move to Greece and asks if she will come. Whitney delightedly accepts, only to realise that Debra is using her when she leaves suddenly, passing her a sealed envelope and saying she will be back for it, and warning her not to open it or she would be "sorry".

Debra returns on 17 July with cuts on her face, just after Ricky leaves after failing to convince Whitney to go to Brighton with them. Debra says that someone is after her; it turns out to be her son Ryan Malloy (Neil McDermott). Whitney and Debra go to an abandoned school and retrieve a bag. Debra will not let Whitney see the contents and when they get home, a man who has been stalking Whitney is inside. The man is Ryan and he and Debra argue. When Whitney defends her mother, Ryan tells her she is his mother too. It is revealed that the bag contains a knife with which Ryan stabbed somebody. Ryan returns the next morning and argues with Debra again, causing Whitney to run out and throw the knife into the canal. When she returns, Debra plans to leave but when Whitney tells her about her abuser Tony King (Chris Coghill) and his upcoming trial and says she is going to cook them a family meal, she agrees to stay. When Ryan and Debra are alone he tells her to leave, insisting she is a bad mother and that Whitney is better off without her. Looking frightened, Debra leaves. In December, Debra sends Ryan a text message to say that she cannot attend Tony's trial to support Whitney and not to contact her again.

== Marissa Moore ==
Marissa Moore
- EastEnders character
- Portrayed by: Finn Atkins
- First appearance: Episode 3719; 13 January 2009
- Last appearance: Episode 3728; 29 January 2009
- Introduced by: Diederick Santer
In-universe information
- Occupation: Prostitute

Marissa Moore, played by Finn Atkins, makes her first on-screen appearance on 13 January 2009, working at the newly opened Gilly's Massage Parlour. The parlour is met with opposition from Peggy Mitchell (Barbara Windsor) and Dot Branning (June Brown), amongst other residents. Peggy tries to convince Patrick Trueman (Rudolph Walker) not to serve Marissa in his shop, but Jay Brown (Jamie Borthwick) sticks up for her and strikes up a friendship with her.

As Kris Green of Digital Spy reports, "Jay tries to take his friendship with Marissa to another level. [...] He plans to run away with Marissa. [...] When Jay meets with Marissa, however, he's confused by her behaviour. All's not what it seems with the young female as she brushes Jay off and makes a call and says into the mic: 'I did what you said. Now leave him alone.'"

Atkins discussed her role in an interview with the Nottingham Evening Post. When asked about her using her Nottingham accent in the show, Atkins said that she had had "nice feedback" about it and explained that she had prepared a London accent for her audition but was told the producers preferred her Nottingham accent, so she was pleased and felt like she was "representing the city". Atkins described the character at some length, noting, "My character, Marissa, was in a lot of scenes with Jamie Borthwick, who plays Jay Brown... Marissa was a runaway who had been let down by people. She arrived in London to stay with a friend, but found the friend wasn't there, so she'd been on her own and the hardship had forced her into prostitution. Obviously that wasn't something that EastEnders could delve too much into, but you got the idea that she was going through hard times. She could seem quite hard but she did have a softer side. I don't know if they'll return to the storyline or not... The character, Marissa, was only 16. Because I'm quite small I can play anything from 15 up to my age or even a bit older."

Grace Dent writes, "I feel sad for Marissa already. Gilly's brothel is a garish tribute to why this really is still a man's world and Marissa's just the faceless droid who masturbates him. I'm not sure that banning Marissa from the [café] so she can't have a bacon sandwich afterwards is really solving anything."

== Andy Jones ==
Andy Jones
- EastEnders character
- Portrayed by: Aneirin Hughes
- Duration: 2009, 2016
- First appearance: Episode 3721; 16 January 2009
- Last appearance: Episode 5326; 2 August 2016
- Introduced by: Diederick Santer (2009); Dominic Treadwell-Collins (2016)
In-universe information
- Wife: Lizzie Jones (backstory)
- Sons: Andy Flynn
- Adoptive daughters: Danielle Jones

Andy Jones, played by Aneirin Hughes, is the adoptive father of established character Danielle Jones (Lauren Crace). He is mentioned frequently when Danielle arrives in Albert Square in August 2008 to locate her birth mother Ronnie Mitchell (Samantha Womack) and makes his first on-screen appearance on 16 January 2009 after Ronnie phones him after Danielle confesses to her about her pregnancy. Hughes briefly reprised the role for a short stint beginning on 6 June 2016.

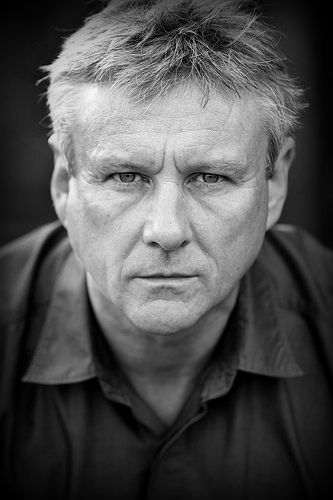
Andy Jones is portrayed by actor Aneirin Hughes.

Andy asks Danielle to return to their hometown Telford as her brother, Gareth, is getting married. He also says that they will support her through her pregnancy but she says she wants to stay in London. After he leaves, Danielle tells Ronnie that her father has said she should have an abortion and later that evening, books one at the hospital. Andy is mentioned a month later when Danielle visits him and Gareth after her bond with Ronnie begins falling apart. However, she soon misses Ronnie and Walford. Andy is upset and angry when Danielle tells him about her abortion and how she searched for her biological mother. Danielle decides to return to Walford because of this.

Two months later, Danielle finally reveals her true identity to Ronnie, but is accidentally knocked down by Janine Butcher (Charlie Brooks) and dies. Andy returns and talks to Danielle's friend Stacey Slater (Lacey Turner) about the life Danielle had in Walford. When he meets Ronnie again, he realises that she is the woman who gave Danielle up for adoption and blames her for Danielle's death. He returns for Danielle's funeral and does not allow Ronnie to attend but makes amends later at the house by telling her about Danielle's childhood and life up till she came to Walford. He gives Ronnie Danielle's childhood teddy bear and at first she declines, knowing Danielle means more to him than her, but later accepts for the sake of Danielle. As Ronnie leaves, he talks about Danielle's good nature, saying she must have got it from her adoptive mother, Lizzie. He then calls Ronnie back into the house before she leaves and gives her all of Danielle's photos. He tells her he was wrong to blame her for her death, and that he realises it was her father Archie Mitchell's (Larry Lamb) fault she died.

Seven years later, a bedridden Andy is visited in hospital by his son Andy Flynn (Jack Derges), who tells his father he is getting closer to Ronnie, who does not know his true identity. In August, Andy Jr brings Ronnie's son Matthew Mitchell Cotton, along with her partner, Jack Branning's (Scott Maslen) children, Amy Mitchell (Abbie Knowles) and Ricky Mitchell (Henri Charles) to see Andy Sr, and notes that Matthew looks like Danielle. Andy Jr is then revealed to be Gareth, when Andy Sr calls him such.

== Theo Kelly ==
Theo Kelly
- EastEnders character
- Portrayed by: Rolan Bell
- First appearance: Episode 3726; 26 January 2009
- Last appearance: Episode 3806; 15 June 2009
In-universe information
- Occupation: Researcher; Student

Theo Kelly, played by Rolan Bell, was scripted as a love interest for the character Chelsea Fox (Tiana Benjamin), who, it is claimed, was won over by his "good looks and impeccable manners". He appears between 26 January and 15 June 2009.

According to a BBC news release, "Theo's good looks and manners make him a hit with the ladies on the Square. He seems like the perfect gent". Discussing his casting, Rolan Bell said, "As a lifelong fan of EastEnders it is amazing to be part of the show – everyone has been so welcoming on set. Working with actors such as Rudolph Walker has been a dream come true and I can't wait to see how my character develops on screen." He added, "I auditioned for EastEnders a few years ago when I 'd just left drama school and, quite luckily, I didn't get the part because it was only a small walk-on role. When the audition for Theo came up, I just went for it and gave it all I could."

In an interview with media website Digital Spy, Bell revealed information about his character's personality: "He's a well-to-do guy [...] He's been raised with good manners and he's definitely a mummy's boy. He's the kind of guy that wants to do right by women, but at the same time, he's a bit of a ladies' man. He's quite a gentleman and definitely old-fashioned." According to Bell, the writers of EastEnders pitched Theo as "a young, charming guy with impeccable manners"; however, he revealed that not much about his character's background was revealed in the beginning, so development has been "an organic process".

In February 2009, the character was featured as part of EastEnders' first episode acted by an all-black cast, which received attention in the British media.

The character's backstory was revealed by Bell: "Theo's grown up in a one-parent family in Brixton [...] he's the eldest of his brothers and sisters – he's actually one of six children [...] The father/son relationship is quite distant – almost non-existent – and I think that's why he has the attitude towards women that he has. Theo's seen the pain his mother's been through and he has quite a compassion for women in that situation."

Theo arrives in Walford in search of Patrick Trueman (Rudolph Walker). He is looking for him on behalf of Tommy Clifford (Edward Woodward) in regard to the 1950s race riots that Patrick was involved with. He introduces Tommy to Patrick, not realising that Tommy is the man who killed Patrick's fiancée during the riots. Theo begins dating Chelsea, who is close to Patrick, but when Tommy's true identity is discovered, Theo falls out with Chelsea, although she eventually forgives him, believing that he was not a part of Tommy's deception.

Chelsea believes she is not intelligent enough for Theo, and she strays with a footballer named Ellis Prince (Michael Obiora) in June 2009. Theo is willing to forgive her, but Chelsea rejects him due to her insecurities. Chelsea later dumps Theo in favour of Ellis and leaves Walford with Ellis. However, she returns a few weeks later, admitting to her family that she has been the victim of domestic abuse. She has had no further contact with Theo and he has not been seen around Albert Square since.

== Roger Clarke ==
Roger Clarke
- EastEnders character
- Portrayed by: Geoffrey Hutchings
- First appearance: Episode 3731; 3 February 2009
- Last appearance: Episode 3733; 6 February 2009
In-universe information
- Wife: Linda Clarke
- Sons: Christian Clarke
- Daughters: Jane Beale
- Grandsons: Bobby Beale (adoptive)

Roger Clarke, played by Geoffrey Hutchings, is the husband of Linda Clarke (Lynda Baron) and father of Jane Beale (Laurie Brett) and Christian Clarke (John Partridge). He lives in Florida with his wife and rarely sees his children. He is first mentioned in November 2006 when Linda arrived in Walford for Jane's wedding to Ian Beale (Adam Woodyatt), explaining that Roger's absence was due to ill health. He is again mentioned by Linda when she turns up on Ian and Jane's doorstep in November 2008, announcing that Roger has left her and has been having an affair with a nurse named Marion for months. After a few months apart, Roger writes to Linda in January 2009 asking for a reconciliation.

Roger arrives in Walford on 3 February 2009 after being contacted by Ian to take Linda home. Upon his arrival, Roger and Linda reminisce over old times and, after he reveals that he and Marion have gone their separate ways, he declares his love for Linda and asks her to return to Florida with him. After initial doubts, Linda agrees and the couple leave Walford on 6 February 2009.

== Syd Chambers ==
Syd Chambers
- EastEnders character
- Portrayed by: Nina Toussaint-White
- First appearance: Episode 3733; 6 February 2009
- Last appearance: Episode 3909; 11 December 2009
- Introduced by: Diederick Santer
In-universe information
- Occupation: Nurse
- Sons: Noah Chambers

Sydney "Syd" Chambers is played by Nina Toussaint-White and appeared on screen between 6 February and 11 December 2009. After her first appearance, it was revealed that Syd has a deaf son named Noah.

In January 2009, it was announced that actress Nina Toussaint-White would join EastEnders playing Syd, a new love interest for Bradley Branning (Charlie Clements). Speaking of her part, Toussaint-White said: "I have been a fan of EastEnders for as long as I can remember and I am extremely excited to be working on such a great show. Finding out I got the job was exciting, but standing on the Square for the first time was amazing although very surreal." She added: "I'm looking forward to working with Charlie Clements and seeing what Syd is going to get up to."

Toussaint-White has subsequently claimed that the relationship between Bradley and Syd is an attempt to portray more interracial relationships in EastEnders. However, she and co-star John Partridge also urged the soap to go further in trying to accurately portray the diversity of modern London.

The result of Syd's relationship with Bradley is directly linked to the high-profile storyline of Stacey Slater's (Lacey Turner) ongoing battle with bipolar disorder, and her subsequent sectioning.

=== Storylines ===
Syd and her dog, Sugar, come to Walford in February 2009 to return Gumbo, Bradley Branning's (Charlie Clements) dog, who had gone missing. Upon meeting Bradley, she accepts his offer of a cup of tea and is seen again in March when Bradley finally plucks up the courage to phone her. Later that evening, they spend time together at his home but are briefly interrupted by Bradley's estranged wife, Stacey Slater (Lacey Turner). Liking the area, Syd moves into the flat above the bookmakers and begins dating Bradley. She finds herself attracted to him as he is different from the other men she has dated, and when Bradley confesses that he is unemployed, she admires his honesty and kisses him, cementing their relationship.

However, she disappears for some time, making Bradley worried that she is no longer interested. When she finally reappears, she insists that she has been busy with her job as a nurse. Bradley, however, remains unconvinced that Syd has feelings for him and, attempting to prove him wrong, she gives him a rose and they sleep together. Bradley is delighted by this but Syd breaks his heart when she finishes with him. After seeing a man leave her flat, Bradley decides to move to Edinburgh until Syd hears about it. She rushes to his house and begs him to reconsider, inviting him to her flat so she can explain her actions. Bradley relents and Syd introduces him to her deaf son Noah (Micah Thomas), informing him that the man he saw was her babysitter.

When Bradley is admitted to hospital, his father Max Branning (Jake Wood) urges Syd to visit him, but she refuses because she does not want to leave Noah. She changes her mind when Noah takes a shine to Bradley and asks about him.

In August, she receives a job offer in Canada. Excited, Noah announces that Bradley is coming with them, but Bradley is worried about leaving his family behind, particularly his grandfather, who has just returned from a nursing home. She is sad but understands his circumstances. Noah too is against the idea of moving to Canada as he has made friends in Walford. After arguing with Stacey, Bradley tells Syd that he will go to Canada with her and Noah whenever she wants. They leave on 9 October but return on 7 December to visit his mother, Rachel Branning (Pooky Quesnel), in hospital. However, Bradley tells Syd that he is still in love with Stacey and refuses to return to Canada. She tries but fails to convince him that Stacey is trying to split them up and that he cannot leave Noah. However, he insists he is staying in Walford and says goodbye to them after helping to put their luggage in the car. Heartbroken, she and Noah leave without Bradley.

Syd was not heard from again until February 2010 when her former roommate Amira Masood (Preeya Kalidas) contacted her to inform her of Bradley's death.

== Todd Taylor ==
Todd Taylor
- EastEnders character
- Portrayed by: Ashley Kumar
- Duration: 2009–2010
- First appearance: Episode 3735; 10 February 2009
- Last appearance: Episode 3948; 12 February 2010
- Introduced by: Diederick Santer

Todd Taylor, played by Ashley Kumar, is introduced as a love interest for Whitney Dean (Shona McGarty). The pair meet at the laundrette on 10 February 2009 when they are doing their laundry. They are later reacquainted when coincidentally Todd is working for Ricky Butcher (Sid Owen) as a car valet and Whitney accidentally picks up and washes a pair of Todd's boxer-briefs.

Todd is shy but asks her out on a date. Whitney initially is not interested, but later changes her mind. Their first date starts well, but when Todd tells Whitney about his past relationship with another girl, he puts pressure on her, wanting to know about her past relationship too. Whitney runs away when she feels haunted over her sexual abusive relationship with paedophile Tony King (Chris Coghill). Todd later bumps into Whitney and asks her what was bothering her, but she storms off, although he finds her later again and immediately contact Ricky, where he discovers her drunk in a dark alleyway. The next day Todd visits the Whitney's home to check on her and drops off some chocolates for her. This makes a good impression on Ricky as he states that Todd is a mature person that cares for Whitney, unlike Tony who took advantage of her.

Todd appears two months later after his new boss Darren Miller (Charlie G. Hawkins) buys the car lot back from Ricky's manipulative sister Janine Butcher (Charlie Brooks). He meets Whitney again when he comes to play on his Xbox 360. However things do not end as expected when Tiffany Dean (Maisie Smith), Whitney's adoptive sister's pet caterpillar crawls into his clothes and he takes off his shirt in a panic. When Ricky walks into the room, he thinks that Todd is stripping for Whitney and kicks him out. Later on, Todd helped Whitney down from the swing in the playground and she stumbles onto him, which leads her to think he was about to kiss her. Todd later turns up at her home where Ricky apologises for the misunderstanding, along with Whitney making up with him. They go to play on the Xbox again but Todd accidentally stands on the caterpillar, much to Tiffany's dismay. Whitney and Todd decide to just be friends, but Whitney discovers a condom in his wallet, which he left behind by mistake, discovering that he is still thinking of being more than just friends. After trying to apologise to Whitney and telling her his mother made him carry a condom, he is threatened into leaving by Whitney's older brother Ryan Malloy (Neil McDermott).

He returns in December 2009 when he bumps into Ricky in The Queen Victoria, who thinks Todd may help Whitney take her mind off Tony's abuse trial. Todd goes to see Whitney to give her a Christmas card, saying he hopes they are still friends, and she lets him in. He cooks mince pies and says he wants to be a mechanic like Ricky. Whitney realises that Ricky has put him up to spending time with her but they later play darts together in the pub. However, the next time he invites her out, she turns him down and he embarrasses himself and leaves. Whitney starts ignoring Todd's calls, and she is upset when Ricky invites him to his and Bianca Jackson's (Patsy Palmer) engagement party on New Year's Eve. When he turns up, Whitney apologises and they kiss after midnight.

Todd and Whitney find Darren asleep on a park bench and help him, as he is freezing cold. Todd reveals he is a first aider. Lucy Beale (Melissa Suffield) invites Todd to a house party and he invites Whitney. At the party, Lucy comes onto Todd so Whitney takes him off to a bedroom. He tells her about a girl whose life he once saved when she was choking. They plan to have sex but then change their minds and decide to wait. At a meal with Whitney, Janine and Ryan, Ryan sarcastically makes fun of Todd's anecdotes. When Whitney's step-uncle Billie Jackson (Devon Anderson) arrives for Bianca and Ricky's wedding in February 2010, Whitney shows a clear interest in him and once again starts shunning Todd, much to his jealousy. As her feelings for Billie start to deepen, she breaks up with Todd, despite his pleading with her to give him another chance, telling her that he loves her and that he will get a motorbike like Billie if that will impress her, but she remains cold with him, and he leaves the Square in tears.

== Pearl Rogers ==
Pearl Rogers
- EastEnders character
- Portrayed by: Su Elliot
- First appearance: Episode 3739; 17 February 2009
- Last appearance: Episode 3741; 20 February 2009

Pearl Rogers, played by Su Elliot, is a local homeless woman who takes shelter in fish and chip shop Beale's Plaice on 17 February 2009, much to the chagrin of owner Ian Beale (Adam Woodyatt). This prompts him to forbid his charitable employee Lucas Johnson (Don Gilet) to serve her. However, Lucas ignores him and gives her some chips for free. She has a conversation with Dawn Swann (Kara Tointon) when she confides in Pearl about her relationship with Garry Hobbs (Ricky Groves). During this conversation, Pearl states that she is a widow and her husband died of cancer. She is last seen on 20 February 2009 when Lucas is caught giving free food from Beale's Plaice to her and homeless friends. This leads to Ian and Lucas having an argument and Lucas decides to quit his job.

== Trina Johnson ==
Trina Johnson
- EastEnders character
- Portrayed by: Sharon Duncan-Brewster
- First appearance: Episode 3742; 23 February 2009
- Last appearance: Episode 3853; 4 September 2009
- Introduced by: Diederick Santer
In-universe information
- Husband: Lucas Johnson (backstory)
- Sons: Jordan Johnson
- Stepdaughters: Chelsea Fox
- Grandsons: JJ Johnson

Trina Johnson, played by Sharon Duncan-Brewster, is introduced as the wife of already established character Lucas Johnson (Don Gilet) and mother of his son Jordan (Michael-Joel David Stuart).

She first appears on 23 February 2009, unexpectedly to Lucas, Jordan and Lucas's fiancée Denise Wicks (Diane Parish). At first, Lucas is shocked to see her and tells her that their marriage is over and that he is going to marry Denise. It is revealed that Trina is also a drug addict. After being warned by Patrick Trueman (Rudolph Walker) to stay away from them, she shockingly tells him that Lucas spent Christmas with her. She is not seen after this and when Patrick confronts Lucas, he says he has applied for a divorce.

Patrick sees Trina spying on Lucas and Denise kissing, on 19 June 2009. A week later, Lucas reveals to Denise he dislikes Trina because she was a bad mother to Jordan. When he was a baby, he was born addicted to heroin – the reason why she abandoned him. The following week, Trina reveals that Lucas spent Christmas with her, which prompts Denise to throw Lucas out. After being rejected by Lucas, Trina is kicked out of The Queen Victoria public house by barmaid Roxy Mitchell (Rita Simons) for throwing a drink over Jack Branning (Scott Maslen). Trina goes to Pat Evans' (Pam St Clement) house where Lucas is staying and comes downstairs in her underwear, asking Lucas to come back to bed, witnessed by Denise who has only just forgiven Lucas.

Trina plays a trick on Denise by telling the police that Denise is abusing Jordan. However, the social worker can find no evidence of abuse. Despite all of her plans to drive them further apart, Trina tells Lucas and Denise that she has agreed to a divorce. However, she also tells them that she is planning to relocate to Walford with Jordan. A few weeks later she returns during an exciting day for Denise's daughter Libby Fox (Belinda Owusu). The family are planning to go to celebrate as Libby has a place to study at Oxford University. Trina turns up and Jordan is ecstatic, but Denise tells Lucas to get rid of her. Outside, he asks her if she is back on drugs to which she walked off, determined to have Lucas back. She sleeps with Lucas again and the next day arranges to meet him in the allotments. They meet in Charlie Slater's (Derek Martin) shed but as she tries to seduce him he pushes her away and her throat is impaled on a rake. Lucas leaves the shed as she lies bleeding to death. She attempts to phone Denise but dies before the call connects. When Lucas goes in to check on her, he sees she is dead and hears Denise on the phone. He ends the call and assembles evidence around Trina to make it look like she died in an accident whilst taking drugs.

Her body is discovered on 14 September by Jordan and his friend Abi Branning (Lorna Fitzgerald), with Lucas watching from a distance. Trina's death is pronounced as an accident by the police on 29 September 2009.

In October 2011, Duncan-Brewster received a special mention at the Screen Nation Awards for her portrayal of Trina, which celebrated the best British Black talent.

== Manda Best ==
Amanda "Manda" Best, played by Josie Lawrence, is an old friend and former girlfriend of Phil Mitchell (Steve McFadden). She was first seen on screen on 6 March 2009. Lawrence appeared in nearly 50 episodes as Manda between 2009 and 2010. It was announced in November 2009 that Lawrence had quit EastEnders and she made her final appearance on 12 February 2010. Most of Manda's storylines revolve around her former school friends and history, such as meeting Phil after their brief relationship in their teens and Minty Peterson (Cliff Parisi) with whom she went on to have a relationship. In June 2009, Manda's son, Adam Best (David Proud), a wheelchair user who has spina bifida, was introduced. Adam takes an instant dislike to Minty which causes friction between Manda and Minty. Manda is described as "loving, strange (in a good way) and creative". Lawrence described Manda as spiritual. She is also described as independent, but secretly yearns to meet "Mr Right".

== Tommy Clifford ==
Tommy Clifford
- EastEnders character
- Portrayed by: Edward Woodward
- First appearance: Episode 3757; 23 March 2009
- Last appearance: Episode 3776; 23 April 2009
In-universe information
- Occupation: Retired

Tommy Clifford, played by Edward Woodward, is a man who is interested in Patrick Trueman (Rudolph Walker). He is a neighbour of researcher Theo Kelly (Rolan Bell), who has already met Chelsea Fox (Tiana Benjamin) and confirmed that she lives with Patrick. Together they want to meet with Patrick and ask him about the 1958 Notting Hill race riots. He makes friends with Patrick, claiming to be an author writing about the riots.

However, it is revealed that Tommy is not an author and he was racist back then. He sincerely apologises and cries when Patrick realises Tommy is the person who started a fire that killed Patrick's fiancée, Ruth. He then goes on to reveal that the reason he is confessing now is because he is dying from kidney failure and does not have long left to live.

Patrick refuses to forgive Tommy, but Libby Fox (Belinda Owusu) says that Tommy deserves a chance to explain himself and that Patrick should visit him. He tells her to mind her own business but she later visits Tommy only to find he has been admitted to hospital. Patrick goes with Denise Wicks (Diane Parish) to visit Tommy in hospital, where Tommy begs for forgiveness, but when he mentions Ruth, Patrick storms out. Denise tells Patrick that the nurse said Tommy will most likely not make it through the night, so decides to go back in and forgive Tommy, who dies with Patrick by his side on 23 April 2009.

== Syed Masood ==
Syed Masood, played by Marc Elliott, first appeared on screen on 21 April 2009. Syed is a British Pakistani and is the eldest son of Masood Ahmed (Nitin Ganatra) and Zainab Masood (Nina Wadia), and brother of Tamwar Masood (Himesh Patel), Shabnam Masood (Zahra Ahmadi) and Kamil Masood (Arian Chikhlia). Syed's storylines see him fall in love with a man, Christian Clarke (John Partridge), and his eventual acceptance that he is gay. Syed initially marries girlfriend Amira Shah (Preeya Kalidas) but later comes out, and enters a relationship with Christian, despite the pressures of his family and his Muslim faith.

== Ryan Malloy ==
Ryan Malloy, played by Neil McDermott, was introduced to the show as a mystery character, who was credited simply as "Man" to keep his identity hidden but was revealed to be the half brother of established character Whitney Dean (Shona McGarty). He has a dark past and Santer called him "intriguing and complex". Ryan's first on-screen appearance was on 28 April 2009. He has been involved in a love triangle with his wife, Janine Butcher (Charlie Brooks) and Stacey Branning (Lacey Turner), the mother of his daughter, Lily Branning.

== Al Jenkins ==
Al Jenkins, played by Adam Croasdell, is introduced as the new general practitioner, arriving on 1 May 2009. Al is described as "a big kid [and a] free spirit", and Croasdell called him "outdoorsy, a good doctor and generally nice – but not too nice." Croasdell quit the role in 2010 to embark on a charity visit to Malawi, and Al's last appearance was on 4 February 2010. His storylines involved romances with Roxy Mitchell (Rita Simons) and Chelsea Fox (Tiana Benjamin).

== Amira Masood ==
Amira Masood (also Shah), played by Preeya Kalidas, is the girlfriend, and later wife, of Syed Masood (Marc Elliott), she first appeared on screen in the episode broadcast on 7 May 2009. The character was described as high maintenance, lonely and insecure. Amira and Syed's wedding on 1 January 2010 was watched by an average of 11.64 million viewers. Kalidas quit the show in January 2010 to concentrate on a career in music, filming her final scenes in March 2010. Her final episode was broadcast on 26 April 2010, after Amira discovered that her husband was gay and had been having an affair with Christian Clarke (John Partridge). Amira returned in October 2011, with her one-year-old daughter Yasmin Masood in tow. She left EastEnders again in early 2012.

== Noah Chambers ==
Noah Chambers
- EastEnders character
- Portrayed by: Micah Thomas
- First appearance: Episode 3791; 19 May 2009
- Last appearance: Episode 3909; 11 December 2009
- Introduced by: Diederick Santer
In-universe information
- Mother: Syd Chambers

Noah Chambers, played by Micah Thomas, is the deaf son of Syd Chambers. He first appears on 19 May 2009 when Syd introduces him to her boyfriend Bradley Branning in a bid to stop him leaving for Edinburgh, as he thinks she has been unfaithful. Syd is offered a job in Toronto, Canada, and Noah responds by running away.

Bradley and Syd find him at the arcade, playing car games. Syd, Noah and Bradley leave for Toronto on 9 October 2009, but return to Walford to see Bradley's mother Rachel who is in hospital after being involved in a car crash. Noah and Syd return permanently to Toronto on 11 December without Bradley as he wants to remain in Walford with his ex-wife Stacey Slater, leaving both Noah and Syd heartbroken.

== Viv Bates ==
Viv Bates
- EastEnders character
- Portrayed by: Dido Miles
- Duration: 2009, 2019
- First appearance: Episode 3794; 25 May 2009
- Last appearance: Episode 6011; 22 October 2019
- Introduced by: Diederick Santer (2009); Kate Oates and Jon Sen (2019)
In-universe information
- Husband: Terry Bates (until 2019)

Viv Bates, played by Dido Miles, first appears on 25 May 2009 for a guest stint. It was reported in the 12–18 October 2019 issue of Inside Soap that Miles had reprised the role while also appearing as a regular cast member in Doctors. She felt pleased to be invited back and enjoyed filming on the soap again. The character appeared in episode 6011, originally broadcast on 22 October 2019. Following her return, Laura-Jayne Tyler of Inside Soap dubbed her a "classic gangster moll" and "boss", demanding that she be promoted to the regular cast.

She first appears when she buys a newspaper and smiles at Billy Mitchell (Perry Fenwick). Billy meets her again in the café and knocks into her, spilling her tea over her, and he buys her another. She appears later on in The Queen Victoria public house where she buys Billy a drink and comes onto him flirtatiously. Billy walks away, and she follows him, revealing her identity as the wife of Terry Bates (Nicholas Ball), the man who murdered Jase Dyer (Stephen Lord). She threatens that if Billy testifies against Terry, she will hurt Jase's son, Jay Brown (Jamie Borthwick), who Billy is the legal guardian of. After Terry is found guilty of Jase's murder, Viv visits him in his holding cell, saying she will no longer take orders from him. She removes her wedding ring and throws it at him. Terry threatens her, but she absconds, leaving him incarcerated for life.

A decade later, Terry dies and Viv returns to organise his funeral. At first, Ben Mitchell (Max Bowden) refuses on behalf of Jay, who is now in charge of Coker and Mitchell funeral parlour, much to Viv's irritation but Jay relents and agrees to bury Terry after realising that Viv does not recognise him.

== Bushra Abbasi ==
Bushra Abbasi
- EastEnders character
- Portrayed by: Pooja Ghai
- Duration: 2009–2011, 2014–2015
- First appearance: Episode 3794; 25 May 2009
- Last appearance: Episode 5092; 26 June 2015
- Introduced by: Diederick Santer (2009); Bryan Kirkwood (2011); Dominic Treadwell-Collins (2014)
In-universe information
- Husband: Nadim Abbasi
- Daughters: Parveen Abbasi; Zulekha Abbasi

Bushra Abbasi, played by Pooja Ghai, is an old friend of Zainab Masood's (Nina Wadia). She and Zainab attempt to set Zainab's eldest son Syed (Marc Elliott) up with one of Bushra's three daughters. When this fails, they decide to set him up with her fourth daughter Parveen (Farzana Dua Elahe). She requests the services of the Masoods' business, Masala Queen, including for a party on 19 June 2009, where she is impressed with Amira Shah's (Preeya Kalidas) singing and books them for further events in July.

She is impressed with caterer Christian Clarke (John Partridge) and asks if his wife will be joining them at the party. She later tells her friend that she cannot believe Christian is single. When Christian said he just has not found the right man yet, Bushra is disgusted, says "your poor mother", and walks off. She later sees Zainab and her family at mosque and helps Zainab home after she suffers a dizzy spell.

In December 2009, she attends Syed and Amira's Mehndi celebration, and in April 2010, she attends their flat-warming party, where it is revealed that Syed is gay. In May, she and her husband Nadim (Kriss Dosanjh) visit Zainab and Masood, and Bushra tells Zainab she must show that she will never approve of Syed to be accepted by the community. She attends a meal at the Masoods' in July. In November, Zainab invites her to visit when she wants to find out some information about Afia Khan (Meryl Fernandes) and her family. In January 2011, she visits the Masoods when they are opening their new restaurant, bringing Zulekha to interview as a waitress. She returns in October 2011, where she finds out Syed and Christian are now living next door to Zainab as a gay couple. She insults the pair after seeing them kissing in the street and Zainab slaps Bushra, saying she is the sick one and she never wants to see her again.

Bushra returns on 20 February 2014 to visit the Masoods. She is delighted to see Shabnam Masood (Rakhee Thakrar), but is not very impressed to see Masood or Tamwar. Masood rages at Bushra over her behaviour, and throws her out of the house. Masood later reveals to Tamwar and Shabnam how good it felt to shout at Bushra.

In June 2015, Bushra attends Shabnam's engagement party to Kush Kazemi (Davood Ghadami) and is shocked to discover that Shabnam had a baby with Dean Wicks (Matt Di Angelo). She then gossips about the rest of the Masood family to Kush's mother Carmel Kazemi (Bonnie Langford), but Carmel calls her two-faced and threatens to slap her. Later in the month, Bushra attends a charity event for homeless people held at the community centre. She makes a speech and objects to Stacey Branning (Lacey Turner) being present at the event.

== Zulekha Abbasi ==
Zulekha Abbasi
- EastEnders character
- Portrayed by: Lisa Shah
- Duration: 2009–2012
- First appearance: Episode 3795; 26 May 2009
- Last appearance: Episode 4439/4440; 6 June 2012
- Introduced by: Diederick Santer (2009); Bryan Kirkwood (2011, 2012)
In-universe information
- Occupation: Optician's receptionist
- Father: Nadim Abbasi
- Mother: Bushra Abbasi
- Sisters: Parveen Abbasi
- First cousins: Afia Masood

Zulekha Abbasi, played by Lisa Shah, is one of Bushra Abbasi's (Pooja Ghai) three "beautiful" daughters that Zainab Masood (Nina Wadia) tries to set up her son Syed (Marc Elliott) on a date with on 26 May 2009. She appears alongside her two sisters who are unnamed and uncredited.

She returns on 29 December 2009 before Syed's wedding to Amira Shah (Preeya Kalidas), for their Mehndi where she shows an interest in Syed's younger brother Tamwar (Himesh Patel), writing a mobile number on his palm. Tamwar arranges a date but is surprised when Zulekha's friend Afia Khan (Meryl Fernandes) turns up as Zulekha gave him Afia's number instead. On 13 January 2011, Zulekha turns up in Walford as a potential waitress for the Argee Bhajee restaurant that Zainab and Masood Ahmed (Nitin Ganatra) bought for Tamwar, but Tamwar realises that all the waitresses are actually potential wives.

She appears again on 1 April 2011 when Masood gets an eye test where she works. She tells Masood that Afia could get any man she wanted. This leads Masood to believe that Afia has lied that she has not been with anybody before Tamwar, and to Afia and Tamwar marrying in secret. Zulekha attends Afia and Tamwar's mangni (engagement party) and apologises to Afia.

She visits Afia and Tamwar again on 1 June 2012 and asks them if they will host a speed dating event at their restaurant. Tamwar refuses initially but Afia agrees to host the event. Zulekha attends the event on 6 June, and tells Afia about her travels abroad.

== Parveen Abbasi ==
Parveen Abbasi
- EastEnders character
- Portrayed by: Farzana Dua Elahe
- First appearance: Episode 3796; 28 May 2009
- Last appearance: Episode 3804; 11 June 2009
In-universe information
- Occupation: Student
- Father: Nadim Abbasi
- Mother: Bushra Abbasi
- Sisters: Zulekha Abbasi
- First cousins: Afia Masood

Parveen Abbasi, played by Farzana Dua Elahe, is Bushra Abbasi's (Pooja Ghai) fourth daughter. She appears on 28 May 2009 when Zainab Masood (Nina Wadia) tries to fix her son Syed (Marc Elliott) on a date with her. She later dumps curry all over him during lunch, but after catching Zainab and Syed's father Masood Ahmed (Nitin Ganatra), she and Syed pretend they are getting on and want to live together and get married. They realise that Syed's parents have set up a hidden camera to spy on them, and eventually expose it, ending the pretence. She also mentions that she has a photographic memory. Her last appearance is on 11 June 2009.

In December 2009, it is revealed by Bushra that Parveen has gone to Washington D.C. to study for a PhD. In November 2010, it is revealed that Parveen is engaged to be married.

== James Mackie ==
James Mackie
- EastEnders character
- Portrayed by: Paul Keating
- First appearance: Episode 3806; 15 June 2009
- Last appearance: Episode 3867; 29 September 2009
- Introduced by: Diederick Santer

James Mackie, played by Paul Keating, is a childhood friend of Christian Clarke's (John Partridge) who visits for Christian's birthday on 15 June 2009. James, like Christian, is gay, but they both assert that they are just friends. After going out clubbing, Christian makes advances towards James, but he says he is in a relationship, and Christian asks him to leave. In September, he turns up at Christian's flat saying his partner broke up with him and Christian lets him spend the night. Christian's friend Amira Shah (Preeya Kalidas) says James and Christian would make a good couple. James confides in Amira's fiancée Syed Masood (Marc Elliott) that he has always been a little bit in love with Christian, but Syed, with whom Christian is having an affair, tells James that Christian doesn't want a relationship. James packs his bags to leave, but after breaking up with Syed, Christian kisses James and asks him to stay. James later thanks Syed for bringing him and Christian together. Christian breaks up with James after kissing Syed again. James is heartbroken and confides in Syed. He moves out of Christian's flat on 29 September 2009.

== Imam Ali ==
Imam Ali
- EastEnders character
- Portrayed by: Emilio Doorgasingh
- Duration: 2009–2011, 2015
- First appearance: Episode 3830; 27 July 2009
- Last appearance: Episode 5169; 6 November 2015
- Introduced by: Diederick Santer (2009); Bryan Kirkwood (2011); Dominic Treadwell-Collins (2015)
In-universe information
- Occupation: Imam

Imam Ali, played by Emilio Doorgasingh, is the imam at the Masoods' mosque. In July 2009 he speaks to Syed Masood (Marc Elliott) and Amira Shah (Preeya Kalidas) about arrangements for their wedding. In September, Syed confides in him that he has feelings for another man, Christian Clarke (John Partridge). He performs Syed and Amira's wedding ceremony on 1 January 2010. In April 2010, Syed's father Masood Ahmed (Nitin Ganatra) talks to him about Syed's sexuality. Ali tells Masood the family will be shunned by the community if it comes out. In May 2010 he overhears Nadim Abbasi (Kriss Dosanjh) tell Syed he should find another mosque so he tells Masood and his wife Zainab Masood (Nina Wadia) that Syed will always be welcome at his mosque. In May 2011, Zainab contacts him and they meet, and she talks about a "friend" who feels her husband has changed. Ali knows she means herself and says that she and Masood have been married for 28 years so it will not always feel the same.

In 2013, there is a new imam, also called Ali. The original Imam Ali returns in June 2015, to attend the engagement party of Shabnam Masood (Rakhee Thakrar) and Kush Kazemi (Davood Ghadami). Later in the month, he attends a charity event for homeless people held at the community centre. In November 2015, he marries Shabnam and Kush.

== Joel Reynolds ==
Joel Reynolds
- EastEnders character
- Portrayed by: Cavan Clerkin
- First appearance: Episode 3836; 6 August 2009
- Last appearance: Episode 3873; 9 October 2009
- Introduced by: Diederick Santer
In-universe information
- Occupation: Accountant
- Brothers: Tim Reynolds
- Wife: Stephanie Reynolds
- Daughters: Danielle Jones; Annabelle Reynolds; Hannah Reynolds; Molly Reynolds

Joel C. Reynolds, played by Cavan Clerkin, is the first love of character Ronnie Mitchell (Samantha Womack), having fathered her daughter, Danielle Jones (Lauren Crace), when they were both 14 years old. Danielle was killed off in the show in April 2009. Joel has been mentioned several times since Ronnie joined the show in 2007, most notably when she attends a school reunion hoping he will be there, and then goes to his house to talk, but one of his daughters answers the door, so she leaves. Ronnie also writes him a letter to tell him their daughter died 13 years previously, although this was a lie told by her father Archie Mitchell (Larry Lamb), and Joel writes back, but Archie destroys the letter before Ronnie can read it.

EastEnders executive producer Diederick Santer said on Clerkin's casting: "[He] is a delightful and subtle actor with a big funny bone. He's grabbed this enigmatic and rather odd character and made it his own." Clerkin said of Joel: "[He] is a nice guy who fantasises about a future with an amazingly beautiful woman, so that's something a lot of men may relate to!"

=== Storylines ===
Joel's introduction to the show begins when Janine Butcher (Charlie Brooks) phones him after stealing Ronnie's address book. She invites him to The Queen Victoria public house and is served by Ronnie. Ronnie sees and recognises Joel when he turns around, and drops their drinks in shock. Phil Mitchell (Steve McFadden) sends both Joel and Janine out of the pub. Joel's car breaks down and while Ronnie offers to fix it for him, they both talk about the memories of their past and he is reacquainted by Archie who fixes his car. Before he leaves, Joel gives his business card to Ronnie. He and Ronnie later meet up and, although Ronnie discovers a picture of his wife and children, they have sex. Archie warns Joel off the next day and gives him money to stay away from Ronnie. Ronnie goes to his office to ask why he has stopped speaking to her and discovers what Archie did. She tells him to meet her in The Queen Vic, but Stephanie turns up with their daughters instead to warn Ronnie off him. Ronnie visits Joel's house and forces him to choose between her and his wife. Joel chooses Ronnie and stays with her at The Queen Vic. Their happiness is then ruined by Ronnie's sister, Roxy (Rita Simons), who reveals that their daughter died four months ago, rather than years ago as he believed. Roxy urges Joel to ask Ronnie about Danielle. He comforts Ronnie, telling her he wishes he could have been there for her. Ronnie tells people she and Joel are trying for a baby, though Joel is unaware that she is trying to get pregnant. When she thinks she is pregnant, he shocks her by telling her he had a vasectomy. Ronnie says he lied to her, but he says he could not find the time to tell her. She admits she is only with him to get pregnant and throws him out. Joel tells Ronnie that she is "dead inside" and walks away with Ronnie's locket, which she had thrown out of her bedroom window. He returns to his family.

In January 2016, Billy Mitchell (Perry Fenwick) and his fiancée Honey (Emma Barton) learn that Joel and his wife Stephanie have died in a speedboating accident. Although Billy is reluctant to tell Ronnie, they eventually do, leaving Ronnie shaken. She and Honey later go and put flowers on Joel's grave.

== Stephanie Reynolds ==
Stephanie Reynolds
- EastEnders character
- Portrayed by: Claire Lubert
- First appearance: Episode 3838; 10 August 2009
- Last appearance: Episode 3843; 18 August 2009
- Introduced by: Diederick Santer
In-universe information
- Husband: Joel Reynolds
- Daughters: Annabelle Reynolds; Hannah Reynolds; Molly Reynolds

Stephanie Reynolds, played by Claire Lubert, is married to Joel Reynolds (Cavan Clerkin). She first appears on 10 August 2009 when she picks Joel up in her car outside The Queen Victoria public house. A week later, she turns up at Joel's office when he is talking to his childhood sweetheart, Ronnie Mitchell (Samantha Womack). She then goes to The Queen Vic with her three daughters, Annabelle, Hannah (Eloise Barnes/Mia Jenkins) and Molly, saying she recognised Ronnie from a photo that Joel had. She warns Ronnie off Joel, saying they will keep the money Ronnie's father Archie (Larry Lamb) paid him to stay away. Ronnie visits Joel's house and forces him to choose between her and his wife. Joel chooses Ronnie and leaves that night. Her last appearance is on 18 August 2009.

In January 2016, Ronnie learns from Billy (Perry Fenwick) and Honey Mitchell (Emma Barton) that Joel and Stephanie have died in a speedboat accident.

== Hannah Reynolds ==
Hannah Reynolds
- EastEnders character
- Portrayed by: Eloise Barnes (2009); Mia Jenkins (2016)
- Duration: 2009, 2016
- First appearance: Episode 3842; 17 August 2009
- Last appearance: Episode 5277/5278; 4 May 2016
- Introduced by: Diederick Santer (2009); Dominic Treadwell-Collins (2016)
In-universe information
- Father: Joel Reynolds
- Mother: Stephanie Reynolds
- Sisters: Annabelle Reynolds; Molly Reynolds
- Half-sisters: Danielle Jones
- Uncles: Tim Reynolds

Hannah Reynolds, played by Eloise Barnes in 2009 and Mia Jenkins in 2016, is the daughter of Joel Reynolds (Cavan Clerkin) and his wife, Stephanie Reynolds (Claire Lubert), and half-sister of Danielle Jones (Lauren Crace). She first appears on 17 August 2009 when Stephanie takes her and her sisters, Annabelle and Molly, to The Queen Victoria public house in Walford to warn Ronnie Mitchell (Samantha Womack) to stay away from Joel. Joel eventually leaves Stephanie for Ronnie and moves into the pub. On 11 September 2009, Hannah is seen when she goes for a picnic with her father in the park and on Joel's birthday on 29 September when it is revealed that it is Hannah's 10th birthday as well. Hannah dislikes Ronnie, saying she stole her father from her, and Ronnie tells Hannah about Danielle, becoming increasingly upset as she does so, which scares Hannah. Joel returns to his family after Ronnie rejects him.

Seven years later, after Joel and Stephanie are killed in a boating accident whilst on holiday, Hannah turns up on Ronnie's doorstep and accuses her of killing her parents. Hannah reveals that Stephanie had only recently forgiven Joel for his affair with Ronnie, they had renewed their marriage vows and were on honeymoon when they died. Ronnie attempts to apologise but Hannah is not convinced and tells Ronnie that she and her sisters are now living with their uncle, Joel's brother, Tim Reynolds (Charlie Baker). Hannah also tells Ronnie that she wants to leave school and get a job to take care of her sisters, before leaving. Ronnie later meets Hannah and Tim and gives Tim a cheque to help look after Joel's daughters. Hannah tears up the cheque and tells Ronnie that she does not want any "blood money" from her and tells her that her father had been right about Ronnie being "dead inside". She and Tim then leave. When Ronnie realises she is being stalked, she suspects Hannah and calls Tim, who brings Hannah to see her. Hannah denies being the stalker, and she and Ronnie bond over their memories of Joel. Ronnie offers support at any time, but Jack Branning (Scott Maslen) discovers that Hannah sent Ronnie flowers in Danielle's name with a message saying "RIP", and when Ronnie tells Hannah she knows this, Hannah, who is holding Ronnie's young son, Matthew Mitchell Cotton, steps into the road into the path of a car. They are saved by Andy Flynn (Jack Derges), and Hannah is arrested for harassing Ronnie. Hannah goes missing before her court appearance, and after she is found Ronnie decides to speak in her defence in court. Afterwards, Hannah and Tim tell Ronnie that the charges against Hannah have been dropped. Hannah insist that she did not send Ronnie any death threats. She and Tim then leave. It is later revealed that Andy, Danielle's adopted brother, is the stalker and had framed Hannah.

== Orlenda ==
Orlenda
- EastEnders character
- Portrayed by: Mary Tamm
- First appearance: Episode 3850; 31 August 2009
- Last appearance: Episode 3853; 4 September 2009
- Introduced by: Diederick Santer

Orlenda, played by Mary Tamm, is a Russian woman who Charlie Slater (Derek Martin) meets at the airport in Madeira after splitting up with Brenda Boyle (Carmel Cryan). She comes back to Walford with Charlie on 31 August 2009 but is accused by Mo Harris (Laila Morse) of being an illegal immigrant. She photographs Orlenda with another man and shows it to Charlie, who confronts her. She admits that she is a scammer but feels that Charlie is too nice for her to go through with it. She returns the money Charlie gave her and leaves Walford on 4 September 2009 along with the man she was seen with.

After her departure, Tamm told entertainment website Digital Spy: "I absolutely loved [being in EastEnders]. It's the Russian background [that got me the role]. My mother, despite spending most of her life in Estonia, was actually Russian. The director I worked with on EastEnders directed me on Brookside and he'd remembered this Russian background so that's why he cast me – because they love to have authenticity where possible. It was great to do and they were all lovely – very friendly and welcoming. It was a very happy experience and I absolutely loved it. Hopefully they'll ask me back, which would be nice."

== Adam Best ==
Adam Best, played by David Proud, is the son of Manda Best (Josie Lawrence). Proud is the first adult actor with a visible disability to appear regularly in the soap. Both Proud and his character live with spina bifida and are wheelchair users, and Adam was introduced to the show as part of a series of measures by the BBC to raise the profile of disabled actors. The character has been described as "self-obsessed" and "snobbish". He makes his first appearance in the episode broadcast on 10 September 2009, with his early storylines revolving around his dislike of his mother's boyfriend, Minty Peterson (Cliff Parisi) and his friendship with Libby Fox (Belinda Owusu). The character was axed by Bryan Kirkwood and made his final appearance on 19 July 2010.

== George Trott ==
George Trott
- EastEnders character
- Portrayed by: Joshua Jacobs (2009–2012); Harrison Stagg (2014)
- Duration: 2009–2012, 2014
- First appearance: Episode 3879; 20 October 2009
- Last appearance: Episode 4886; 8 July 2014
- Introduced by: Diederick Santer (2009); Dominic Treadwell-Collins (2014)
- Spin-off appearances: EastEnders: E20 (2010)
In-universe information
- Father: Darren Miller
- Mother: Heather Trott
- Grandfathers: Keith Miller
- Grandmothers: Rosie Miller; Queenie Trott
- Uncles: Mickey Miller
- Aunts: Dawn Swann; Demi Miller
- First cousins: Aleesha Miller; Summer Swann

George Michael Trott, played by Joshua Jacobs from 2009 to 2012, and Harrison Stagg in 2014, is the son of Heather Trott (Cheryl Fergison) and Darren Miller (Charlie G. Hawkins), named after his mother's favourite singer, George Michael. He is born in the show, in the episode broadcast on 20 October 2009, though it was actually set three days later. Heather discovers she is pregnant in May 2009, which comes as a shock to her as she is 41 years old. She decides to keep the identity of the father a close secret, however, the possible fathers are Darren, Phil Mitchell (Steve McFadden), Minty Peterson (Cliff Parisi) and Billy Mitchell (Perry Fenwick). George left the series when he returned to Darren after Heather's death. George returned to EastEnders on 7 July 2014, to visit Shirley.

After George is born, Darren gets used to having a son and continues to provide for him. In July 2010, Heather makes plans to have George christened. He is christened in September 2010 and his godparents are Minty, Patrick Trueman (Rudolph Walker) and Shirley Carter (Linda Henry). In February 2011, Heather leaves George alone one day and later suffers financial problems and suffers carbon monoxide poisoning from her faulty boiler. She is unable to look after George and leaves him with Darren as she feels he is better off there. Darren's fiancée Jodie Gold (Kylie Babbington) soon gives Darren an ultimatum, and when Darren struggles with George on his own, he returns George to Heather. When Darren announces he is moving away from Walford, he asks Heather to take good care of George, and gives her some money. The money enables Heather and George to move into their own flat. At one point, George is at nursery when he is hurt by Amy Mitchell after she scratches him. When Heather's new partner Andrew Cotton (Ricky Grover) moves into their flat, he looks after George. After Heather is murdered by Ben Mitchell (Joshua Pascoe), George is taken into emergency foster care. George is then returned to Shirley as she is his godmother, while social services attempt to track down Darren. Phil tries to locate Darren himself and eventually manages to get in contact with him. George is then collected by social services and taken to Darren. In July 2014, Shirley brings George back to Walford for a visit and takes him to the Queen Victoria pub where she is now living and introduces him to her family. She also takes him to visit Dot Branning (June Brown). Shirley's son Dean Wicks (Matt Di Angelo) is resentful of George's presence and accuses Shirley of using George to make up for being a bad mother to her own children. Shirley takes George and goes to stay the night at the B&B with Patrick.

=== Creation and development ===
Cheryl Fergison, who plays Heather, revealed to entertainment website Digital Spy how the crew attempted to make Heather's waters breaking appear realistic: "We had several ideas about balloons and gloves filled with water. In the end, I had this balloon between my legs and burst it with my nutcracker thighs. You just see this huge gush! I have to admit, I don't remember a gush myself, but in true EastEnders style, we have a water display! It's all a bit of a shocker and everyone starts panicking." Heather then decides to tell the father about the baby. Fergison commented, "This is where I think the writing's been really clever. When you watch it, you'll see what I mean. They have the suspects – Minty, Phil, Darren and Billy – and all their phones ring. Heather leaves a voicemail on the daddy's phone to let them know that they've become a dad. There are several cuts to all the various suspects and you see each of them flying to the hospital..." The father was revealed to be Darren, played by Charlie G. Hawkins.

Before the father was revealed on screen, Hawkins gave an interview in which he talked about what would happen if Darren was the father: "It would change everything. Darren would worry that [his girlfriend] Libby (Belinda Owusu) wouldn't marry him – and what about Libby's parents Denise (Diane Parish) and Owen (Lee Ross)? I think he'd be alright as a dad, but he wouldn't want the burden. It'd rock the boat if it was Darren." Darren was revealed to be the father of George in the episode broadcast on 23 October 2009. Fergison told Digital Spy, "Darren will be a good dad but he'll be very businesslike about it. He'll say that he doesn't really want to have anything to do with George but will pay his way for him. You'll see him change, though, and you'll start to see him getting attached. [Heather's friend] Shirley (Linda Henry) doesn't want Darren to go anywhere near George, though! It'll be interesting to see how they write it from here for Darren, especially with the Libby angle."

== Kim Fox ==
Kim Fox, played by Tameka Empson, is the half-sister of Denise Johnson (Diane Parish), and aunt to Chelsea Fox (Tiana Benjamin) and Libby Fox (Belinda Owusu). She is initially a guest character, appearing alongside her boyfriend Dexter Mulholland (Robbie Gee) between 24 and 27 November 2009. The character caught the eye of the new executive producer, Bryan Kirkwood, and Kim was subsequently brought back as a regular character in 2010. Kim is described as viscous and bubbly on the outside, but hiding vulnerability and low self-esteem.

== Dexter Mulholland ==
Dexter Mulholland
- EastEnders character
- Portrayed by: Robbie Gee
- First appearance: Episode 3898; 24 November 2009
- Last appearance: Episode 3901; 27 November 2009
- Introduced by: Diederick Santer

Dexter Mulholland, played by Robbie Gee, is the boyfriend of Kim Fox (Tameka Empson). They appear together between 24 and 27 November 2009 for Kim's sister Denise Wicks' (Diane Parish) wedding to Lucas Johnson (Don Gilet). Upon his arrival, Dexter instantly sets his eyes on Kim's niece Chelsea (Tiana Benjamin). At the wedding reception Dexter flirts with her but she turns him down and threatens to tell Kim about his advances. At this point he instantly feels threatened and backs off. Following the reception, Dexter and Kim stay overnight to see Denise and Lucas leaving for their honeymoon the next day. Chelsea tells Denise about Dexter's behaviour towards her and Denise tells Kim about this. Even though Kim already knows the way Dexter behaves to other women, she still loves him. After a family dinner and seeing Denise and Lucas off, Dexter and Kim return home. Several months later, Kim returns to Albert Square and reveals she has separated from Dexter.

In December 2009, executive producer Diederick Santer was asked by entertainment website Digital Spy if there were plans for Kim and Dexter to return. He said, "There's nothing currently storylined for Kim and Dexter, but they really caught my eye. I know they've caught [future executive producer] Bryan [Kirkwood]'s eye, too, because we were only talking about them recently. They work brilliantly with the rest of the family. I hope that if the actors are up for it and if me or Bryan find the right moment, we'll see them again."

== Becca Swanson ==
Becca Swanson
- EastEnders character
- Portrayed by: Simone James
- Duration: 2009–2010
- First appearance: Episode 3906; 7 December 2009
- Last appearance: Episode 4064; 3 September 2010
- Introduced by: Diederick Santer
In-universe information
- Occupation: Market trader (clothing)

Becca Swanson, played by Simone James, is a friend of Stacey Slater's (Lacey Turner) who Stacey meets when she is staying in a psychiatric hospital. When Stacey's mother Jean Slater (Gillian Wright) visits Stacey in hospital on 7 December 2009, Stacey is more interested in Becca. When Jean asks Stacey to come home for one day, Becca tries to convince her not to go. The next day, Stacey's boyfriend Bradley Branning (Charlie Clements) and Jean come to collect Stacey, and Becca and Stacey say an emotional goodbye. Stacey visits her on 19 January 2010 and Becca reveals she is coming out of hospital soon but will be living near Brent Cross, making it difficult for Stacey and Becca to see each other. Stacey later texts her, inviting her to stay in Albert Square.

When she arrives, she wants to meet everyone that Stacey has told her about, including Max Branning (Jake Wood), Bradley's father who Stacey once had an affair with when she was previously married to Bradley. Later, Becca wants to take Stacey out but Bradley does not think she should be going out as she is pregnant. Becca asks Bradley if she is welcome there but he does not answer. In the pub, Becca tells Stacey the doctors thought it was too soon for her to come out and wonders if she should go back. She asks Stacey to call her a taxi. The next day, Stacey will not eat anything, so Bradley brings Becca back to stay and Stacey cheers up. Becca tells Bradley that Stacey has told her that Archie Mitchell (Larry Lamb) raped her, but Stacey assures Bradley that Becca does not know about the attack or that Bradley punched Archie on Christmas Day. Later, Stacey tells Becca not to say anything about Christmas or the baby. However, when Stacey tries out for a barmaid job, she goes to drink a cocktail and Becca reveals to everyone that Stacey is pregnant. The next day, Becca and Stacey look for jobs. Becca suggests opening a stall on the market, but Stacey says the market inspector, Mr Lister (Nick Wilton), hates her. They ask Mr Lister for a chance but he says no. Becca then steals a suit from the launderette and dresses up in it. Posing as 'Amanda Swanson' from Walford Council, Becca tells Mr Lister that Stacey has lodged a complaint against him and makes legal threats. As she and Stacey work on their new stall, Mr Lister tells Becca that her "sister" can stuff her human rights.

Becca starts to think that Stacey does not want her around and thinks that Bradley and Stacey are planning something, but Stacey insists it is not about her. She steals Ronnie Mitchell's (Samantha Womack) hairbrush from The Queen Victoria public house and tells Stacey that she can take a DNA test to prove the baby is Archie's. Becca is upset when she is not invited to Bradley and Stacey's wedding, blaming it on her belief that Bradley hates her. After Becca tells Bradley that he cannot take her best friend away from her, Bradley tells her that he and Stacey are moving away. At Bradley and Stacey's wedding reception, Becca tries to sneak the hairbrush back into Ronnie's bedroom. However, Ronnie catches her and Becca tells her that Archie raped Stacey; "and now she's lumbered with his kid". Ronnie informs Stacey that Archie was infertile after undergoing chemotherapy. Becca then calls the police on Bradley, believing him to be Archie's murderer. Bradley and Stacey flee, but police chase him to a rooftop. Becca watches as Bradley falls from the roof of The Queen Vic to his death. After visiting him in the chapel of rest, Stacey runs away. In an attempt to track Stacey down, Max gives Becca the address of a flat they used during their affair. But after failing to find her, Becca decides to place an advertisement for Bradley's funeral service in The Walford Gazette in the hope that Stacey will see it and come to the funeral. On the day of the funeral, Jean prepares a dress for Stacey, but Becca wears it, leaving Jean furious. Stacey fails to turn up at the funeral. Becca comforts Max after the funeral; he is unable to resist her attempt to seduce him, and they kiss.

The next day Max tells her it was a mistake but she attempts to seduce him by stealing his daughter Abi Branning's (Lorna Fitzgerald) keys and laying naked on his kitchen table covered in cream and fruit. He tells her to get dressed and get out. However, after Max and the Slaters visit the body of a girl found in a river believed to be Stacey, Becca and Max have sex. Becca gets a phone call and leaves in a hurry, so a suspicious Max follows her to a flat where Stacey is staying. Max convinces Stacey to return home, and she and Becca decide to bring up the baby together after she tells Becca that Archie is not the father.

Refusing to allow Stacey to work on the stall due to her pregnancy, Becca comes up with a plan to make more profit. She asks Mo Harris (Laila Morse) to buy Whitney Dean's (Shona McGarty) stock of T-shirts that Fatboy (Ricky Norwood) has promised to sell for her, then sells them on her own stall. She then tells Fatboy she had no idea the T-shirts came from Whitney. Fatboy says he has ideas for T-shirt designs for Whitney's stall, so Becca asks to see them. He gives her a design so she has several T-shirts printed up, but fails to sell them and is humiliated when she realises that the design reads "chav" in the mirror.

Following the birth of Stacey's daughter, Lily, Becca grows increasingly paranoid of people trying to interfere with Stacey's life, leading her to accost Ryan Malloy (Neil McDermott) (who had helped Stacey while she was giving birth) when he shows up at the Slater house with a bouquet for Stacey. Becca is further devastated when Stacey throws her out of her room, as she thinks it is too crowded for her, Lily and Becca to share. Becca starts to manipulate Stacey by deleting a message from Max about the scattering of Bradley's ashes. She convinces Stacey to stop taking her medication and lies about Jean to cause a rift between mother and daughter. When Jean confronts Becca, she says if it was not for her, Stacey would be with a murderer, revealing that she was the person who called the police about Bradley. She tells Jean that if Stacey finds out, it will make her condition worse. Jean tells Stacey and Becca denies it, but Stacey says Jean has never lied to her, so Becca admits the truth. Stacey slaps Becca, causing her to pick up the urn containing Bradley's ashes and throw it at the wall. Becca then leaves Walford after Jean tells her to do so. She is never seen again.

== Qadim Shah ==
Qadim Shah
- EastEnders character
- Portrayed by: Ramon Tikaram
- Duration: 2009–2012
- First appearance: Episode 3912; 17 December 2009
- Last appearance: Episode 4353; 6 January 2012
- Introduced by: Diederick Santer (2009); Bryan Kirkwood (2011)
In-universe information
- Occupation: Businessman
- Wife: Shahana Shah (backstory)
- Daughters: Amira Masood
- Granddaughters: Yasmin Masood

Qadim Shah, played by Ramon Tikaram, is the father of Amira Shah (Preeya Kalidas). He appears in five episodes between 17 December 2009 and 1 January 2010, and again in April 2010. He appears again from 6 September 2011, when Amira returns to Walford. Qadim later leaves on 31 October 2011. Qadim returned for another episode on 6 January 2012.

Qadim is introduced when Amira visits him in prison. They hug and he says he wants to make up for lost time. She tells him she and her boyfriend Syed Masood (Marc Elliott) are back together and are now engaged. Qadim is instantly furious and refuses to give them his blessing. Amira later takes money for the wedding from his safety deposit box without him knowing, using a key she has hidden inside a photo album.

On the day of Amira and Syed's Mehndi celebration, Amira receives a call saying Qadim's lawyer has found a loophole in the law meaning that Qadim can be released. After his release, he interrupts the Mehndi. The next day, Syed's mother Zainab (Nina Wadia) is angry at his actions and Amira is forced to reveal that Qadim has not given his blessing and that she stole the money. Qadim arrives at the Masoods' home and says that Syed does not love Amira and will break her heart. Syed tells him they took his money but Amira interrupts and says it was her idea. Qadim orders her to pack her bags but she defies him and Syed says they will pay back the money. Qadim says angrily says he expects the money the next day in cash and leaves. He returns on the day of the wedding and talks to Amira. When he realises how much Masood has done for her, he gives his blessing and agrees to pay for the wedding.

Qadim returns as a guest at Syed and Amira's house warming party on 23 April, where Syed reveals that he is gay and has been seeing Christian Clarke (John Partridge). Qadim attacks Syed, saying he warned Amira not to marry him. After Amira packs her bags, Qadim takes her home with him. He returns days later with two associates, looking for Syed. Masood tells them he has been unable to contact him. They then break into Christian's flat and wait for him. When he arrives, Qadim demands to know where Syed is and refuses to believe him when he says he does not know. They then beat him up and leave.

In 2011, Syed and Christian decide to find Amira so Syed can get a divorce. They feel the only way to do so is to find Qadim first, but Zainab forbids it as he wanted to kill them both. Zainab's ex-husband and father of her daughter-in-law, Yusef Khan (Ace Bhatti), tells Zainab it may be a good idea to find Amira anyway. He then visits Qadim and says that if Syed can believe he is getting his way, then Yusef will be able to avenge Qadim's humiliation. It is revealed that Qadim has been keeping Amira prisoner in her own home. Amira secretly meets up with Syed, and introduces hers and Syed's daughter, Yasmin to the Masood family. When Yusef phones Qadim and tells him that Amira is at the Masood's house, he storms round there and demands that Amira and Yasmin return with him. Amira refuses, and Qadim leaves stating that Amira is no longer his daughter. The next day he sends round all of Amira and Yasmin's belongings to the Masood house. Qadim returns to Walford in the New Year after Syed phones him to convince Amira to divorce him. After Amira finally agrees to a divorce, Qadim tries to force her to return home, although Masood tells her she is welcome to remain in Walford. Qadim is livid when Amira turns her back on him and he leaves Walford.

=== Development ===
On being cast in the show, Tikaram said: "It's great to be joining a programme that represents a Muslim family in a positive light. It's also fantastic to be working with old friends including Nitin Ganatra (Masood Ahmed) and Preeya Kalidas." Qadim is described as an "intelligent and dynamic man" who "oozes charm and sex appeal", and it is said that the death of his wife left him a "bitter, controlling tyrant". Inside Soap described him as 'wicked' and 'violent', and said "Qadim would be a face Syed would rather forget".

Ganatra told entertainment website Digital Spy that he felt Qadim's attack on Christian was not homophobic, but that of a father venting his anger. Following the episode's broadcast, the BBC received around 40 complaints from viewers who felt the scenes were inappropriate for children and further complaints that the scenes may encourage anti-gay assaults. The BBC said they were careful to ensure their shows were "appropriate for their time slots".

== Afia Masood ==
Afia Masood (also Khan), played by Meryl Fernandes, appeared in five episodes between 29 December 2009 and 5 January 2010, and returned on 18 November 2010. This is Fernandes' second role in EastEnders, her first being a schoolgirl in 1993. The EastEnders website describes Afia as "adventurous and straight to the point, doesn't sugar-coat the truth, and doesn't follow everyone else. [...] She knows what she wants and cunningly knows how to get it". When Afia and Tamwar Masood (Himesh Patel) resume their relationship in 2010, Patel said that Tamwar is grateful for his second chance with Afia. He revealed that he was "very happy" when the producers revealed they were bringing Fernandes back, saying "We filmed together for about three or four weeks when she first came into the show, which was about this time [in 2009]. [...] I was always asking people if she was going to come back. Then she dropped me a text to say that they'd got in touch with her and were bringing her back, which was fantastic." Tamwar and Afia's wedding was voted best wedding at the Inside Soap awards 2011. Afia has been described by TV Pixie as "slightly erratic" and "aloof". When Afia and Tamwar married, the website said that the Afia and Tamwar storyline "ran out of steam" after leaving for their honeymoon. The Mirror states that Afia and Tamwar's wedding is "the kind of sensationally explosive event we have come to expect in Soapland."

== Others ==
Date(s)	Character	Actor	Circumstances
8 January	Mr Hathaway	Uncredited	Lauren Branning's (Madeline Duggan) social worker.
8 January	Sarah McCrea	Uncredited	A friend and fellow student of Libby Fox (Belinda Owusu) and Tamwar Masood (Himesh Patel) who sets up a book club, but is unable to use her home, so uses Tamwar's instead. While Sarah, Libby, Tamwar and their classmates take the club seriously, Libby and Tamwar's mothers, Denise (Diane Parish) and Zainab (Nina Wadia) crash the meeting and mess around.
16 January	Elaine Speight	Badria Timimi	Jean Slater's (Gillian Wright) care worker, who Jean's daughter Stacey (Lacey Turner) calls after her mother becomes depressed following the departure of her son, Sean (Robert Kazinsky). Elaine tells Charlie Slater (Derek Martin) and Mo Harris (Laila Morse) off for their intolerance of Jean. She returns a few hours later when Jean admits herself to a psychiatric unit.
23 January	Kieran	Sam Hoare	A member of a stag party at R&R nightclub, who gets angry when the stripper that Ronnie Mitchell (Samantha Womack) booked is late.
23 January	Andy	Uncredited	The groom of a stag party at R&R nightclub.
26 January	Mr and Mrs Poulton	Uncredited	A couple viewing 18 Albert Square.
29 January, 24–27 August (4 episodes)	Don	Geoff Leesley	A man who Bradley Branning (Charlie Clements) helps with fixing his car, only for him to break the wheel. When Bradley agrees to do something for him, Don leaves his dog Gumbo to Bradley's care. He returns on 24 August to take Gumbo back.
5 February	Dr Maynard	Eiry Thomas	A doctor who oversees Danielle Jones' (Lauren Crace) abortion.
13 February	Eddie	Will Chitty	A man who Heather Trott (Cheryl Fergison) meets at R&R nightclub, although it is assumed that he is the male escort secretly hired for her by best friend Shirley Carter (Linda Henry). It is not known whether he had left due to Shirley assuming that he was the escort that she had booked and berated him to leave.
13 February	Tim	Tarl Caple	A male escort hired for Heather Trott (Cheryl Fergison) by Shirley Carter (Linda Henry), who never actually meets Heather.
13 February	Les Finnis	Ben Homewood	A model scout who spots Dawn Swann (Kara Tointon) walking down Turpin Road, and takes her to a studio to take photo shots of her.
20 February	Bing	James Seager	A man who tries to chat up Dawn Swann (Kara Tointon) in The Queen Victoria.
19–23 March (3 episodes)	Polly	Julia Dalkin	Lauren Branning's (Madeline Duggan) case worker, who is taken for a drink by Max Branning (Jake Wood) so he can get information about his daughter.
10 April	Clive Robinson	Col Farrell	Brenda Boyle's (Carmel Cryan) brother. Jean Slater (Gillian Wright) and Mo Harris (Laila Morse) at first believe he is Brenda's boyfriend. He tells Brenda to tell her boyfriend Charlie Slater (Derek Martin) something as it is in two months' time. It is revealed in August 2009 that Clive is emigrating to Madeira with his family and Brenda is joining them.
21 April	Val	Sian Howard	Brown Owl in the Brownie group that Heather Trott (Cheryl Fergison) helps out with.
24 April	Roger	Matthew Douglas	Syed Masood's (Marc Elliott) landlord who comes to visit him. He introduces himself to Syed's father Masood Ahmed (Nitin Ganatra) who turns his back on Syed for helping him with his money troubles after Roger discloses the fact that Syed owes him the rent for his flat.
30 April	Mr McCormick	Paul Jerricho	Heather Trott's (Cheryl Fergison) doctor, after she suffers an asthma attack.
12–14 May (2 episodes)	Lily	Uncredited	A woman interested in Max Branning (Jake Wood).
8 June	Iqbal	Uncredited	A friend of Zainab Masood's (Nina Wadia) from the Mosque, who brings her a generator when the power in Albert Square goes out.
8–11 June (2 episodes)	Karn	Laura Matthews	A friend of Theo Kelly's (Rolan Bell) from university. When Chelsea Fox (Tiana Benjamin), Theo's girlfriend, becomes wary of her intentions towards Theo, he tells her Karn is a lesbian.
11–18 June (4 episodes)	Ellis Prince	Michael Obiora	A local footballer who plays for Walford Town F.C. who Chelsea Fox (Tiana Benjamin) cheats on Theo with and offers her drugs. She then starts dating him. Chelsea's father Lucas Johnson (Don Gilet) finds drugs in Chelsea's bag, so he assaults Ellis, then Ellis and Chelsea leave the Square. However, Chelsea returns several weeks later, revealing that Ellis hit her.
2 July	Gianfranco	Alexander Yepremian	A man employed to make coffee at Ian Beale's (Adam Woodyatt) café, who takes a liking to Christian Clarke (John Partridge).
3 July	Steve	Uncredited	A vehicle breakdown engineer (towman) who Minty Peterson (Cliff Parisi) gives permission to remove his boss Phil Mitchell's (Steve McFadden) Jaguar without Phil's authorisation.
6–7 July (2 episodes)	Adrian	Jeremy Swift	A man who works at the antenatal clinic visited by Heather Trott (Cheryl Fergison). He later brings Heather's baby scan image to her flat.
9–10 July (2 episodes)	Hugo	Tom Knight	A man who sells 27 Albert Square to Archie Mitchell (Larry Lamb) and takes a liking to Peggy Mitchell (Barbara Windsor).
9 July	Judy Webber	Uncredited	A woman giving facial filler injections using the name Marilyn. Mo Harris (Laila Morse) claims she is 62 years old but injections have made her appear to be in her forties. Pat Evans (Pam St. Clement) and Peggy Mitchell (Barbara Windsor) sign up for injections, but Pat recognises her as Judy Webber, a woman in her forties who used to date her son David Wicks (Michael French).
14–17 July (3 episodes)	Colin	William Keeler	A friend of Bobby Beale's (Alex Francis). He is bribed originally for £50 by Bobby's father Ian (Adam Woodyatt) in order for Bobby to win a talent contest. However the plan backfires when another contestant Dotty Cotton (Molly Conlin) deliberately unplugs a socket that Ian has also purposely plugged to make it sound like Bobby was singing, when it is actually Colin.
21 July	Dr Simmonds	Drew Carter-Cain	A psychiatric doctor who speaks to Stacey Slater (Lacey Turner) about the possibility of her having bipolar disorder.
28 July	Luke	Mark Wakeling	A man who targets Christian Clarke (John Partridge) in a homophobic attack, beating him up in his flat.
28 July	Mr Lambert	Uncredited	A man who applies to be Dot Branning's (June Brown) lodger. He upsets her when he puts his hand on her shoulder after thinking Dot is interested in him. He later attends the speed dating event in The Queen Victoria, where he upsets Roxy Mitchell (Rita Simons), who calls him a pervert. He is then ejected from the pub by Ricky Butcher (Sid Owen).
17 August	Leonie	Anna Niland	A woman who visits Dot Branning (June Brown) from a nursing home confirming that her husband Jim Branning (John Bardon) is ready to return home after recovering from a stroke.
17 August, 29 September (2 episodes)	Molly Reynolds	Uncredited	Joel (Cavan Clerkin) and Stephanie Reynolds' (Claire Lubert) daughters and half-sisters of Danielle Jones (Lauren Crace).
17 August, 29 September (2 episodes)	Annabelle Reynolds	Uncredited	Joel (Cavan Clerkin) and Stephanie Reynolds' (Claire Lubert) daughters and half-sisters of Danielle Jones (Lauren Crace).
24 August	Nikki	Katarina Gellin	A stripper at Garry Hobbs' (Ricky Groves) stag party.
15–18 September (3 episodes)	DC Deanne Cunningham	Zoe Henry	A police officer investigating the death of Trina Johnson (Sharon Duncan Brewster).
27 October	Dave	Paul Shearer	A man running an alcoholics' support group at the community centre that is drunkenly crashed by Ian Beale (Adam Woodyatt) looking for his wife Jane (Laurie Brett).
12 November	Ray	Merryn Owen	A colleague of Max Branning's (Jake Wood).
13 November	Lian	Klariza Clayton	A friend of Lucy Beale's (Melissa Suffield).
23 – 30 November; 1 – 3 December (5 episodes)	Isaacs	Tony Pritchard	A big-built man hired by a loan shark to collect assets belonging to Phil Mitchell (Steve McFadden) after he fails to pay back a loan. Isaacs and his colleagues also beat Phil up as a warning.
23 November	Colin Sydenham	Michael Webber	When Jordan Johnson (Michael-Joel David Stuart) tries to get a tree planted in his mother Trina's (Sharon Duncan Brewster) memory, he stages a protest at the council office, where Colin works. When Chelsea Fox (Tiana Benjamin) turns up and threatens to cause a scene, he promises the tree will be planted the next day.
4 December	Mark	Jamie Baughan	A friend of Tony King's (Chris Coghill) who approaches Whitney Dean (Shona McGarty) to give her an envelope containing a mobile phone so she can talk to him while he is in prison.
7–11 December (3 episodes)	Ms Gilroy	Clare Kissane	The witness service officer at Tony King's (Chris Coghill) trial who shows Whitney Dean (Shona McGarty) around the courtroom.
7–18 December (5 episodes)	Vivien Easley QC	Geraldine Alexander	Whitney Dean's (Shona McGarty) barrister at Tony King's (Chris Coghill) trial.
7 December	Fiona	Madeleine Bowyer	Ian Beale's (Adam Woodyatt) date he met through the internet. She leaves when Ian asks her to pay for their champagne as he brought no money with him, leaving him embarrassed.
7 December	Nurse Wilkins	Wendy Nottingham	A nurse at the psychiatric hospital where Stacey Slater (Lacey Turner) is staying.
8–11 December (3 episodes)	Tyler	Andrew Westfield	A county court bailiff who arrives at Max Branning's (Jake Wood) house along with his colleague Mickey. They put stickers on items they will collect at the end of the week if Max has not paid his debt. They return later to collect Max's assets.
8–18 December (4 episodes)	Mrs Taylor	Jacqueline Defferary	Tony King's (Chris Coghill) barrister at his abuse trial.
15 December	Barbara	Laura Doddington	A woman running an antenatal class attended by Masood Ahmed (Nitin Ganatra) and Zainab Masood (Nina Wadia).
