= Ryan Malloy =

Fictional character from EastEnders

- EastEnders character
- Portrayed by: Neil McDermott
- Duration: 2009–2011, 2014, 2016, 2023
- First appearance: Episode 3779; 28 April 2009
- Last appearance: Episode 6648; 16 February 2023
- Introduced by: Diederick Santer (2009); Dominic Treadwell-Collins (2014, 2016); Sean O'Connor (2016); Chris Clenshaw (2023)
- Spin-off appearances: Last Tango in Walford (2010)
In-universe information
- Occupation: Market trader; Barman; Bookmaker; Doorman; Drug dealer
- Mother: Debra Dean
- Half-sisters: Whitney Dean
- Wife: Janine Butcher (2010–2012); Helen Malloy (2017–present)
- Daughters: Lily Slater
- Granddaughters: Charli Slater
- Nieces: Peach; Dolly Dean-Hudson

Ryan Malloy is a fictional character from the BBC soap opera EastEnders, played by Neil McDermott. From his arrival on 28 April 2009, the character remained a mystery in the show for a number of months, until he was revealed as the half-brother of established character, Whitney Dean (Shona McGarty). Ryan departed on 26 August 2011, and made a surprise guest appearance on 2 September 2014. Following his former lover, Stacey Branning (Lacey Turner), being sectioned in the episode that aired on 22 January 2016, he then made a surprise cameo for a short stint to look after his daughter Lily Branning (Aine Garvey), before departing again on 11 February 2016. Seven months later, Ryan returned on 20 September 2016 after he was released from prison. Ryan returned again on 4 November for Whitney and Lee Carter's (Danny-Boy Hatchard) wedding. On 28 January 2023, it was announced that Ryan would return again and he reappeared for three episodes from 13 to 16 February 2023.

== Creation and development ==
=== Initial stint ===
Ryan was introduced to the show as a mystery character, who was credited simply as "Man" to keep his identity hidden. The show's executive producer, Diederick Santer, remained tight-lipped about the character, saying "I'm not saying too much about him. He's a character played by an actor... All I'll say at this point is that he seems to want to talk to Whitney..." The character's identity was revealed in July 2009 as Whitney Dean's half brother and the son of Debra Dean (Ruth Gemmell), and he was credited as "Ryan" for the first time on 21 July 2009. Santer then described the character as "intriguing and complex", adding, "While incognito, he made a big impression on EastEnders viewers. Now they know who he actually is, I'm sure things will get even more exciting." McDermott auditioned for the part, not knowing the character's relationship to Whitney, but admits he was "very excited", adding, "Sometimes you just really want to get a part and for me, this was one of those occasions." The character is nine years older than his half sister, and is described as having "something of a dark past". He is also said to be very moody, with an interest in women, setting his sights on Ronnie Mitchell (Samantha Womack). The character was involved in gangs, although McDermott said "Ryan's not a really aggressive or violent man, but he's a thief. He ended up moving away from that, though. He'd love to live a normal life, but he's never had the opportunity to." He has been compared to the character of Sean Slater, who was played by Robert Kazinsky, as their scenario and personalities are similar in certain ways. McDermott commented that he sees the character as having a big heart, but scared to show his emotions, saying, "That's where his aggression comes from — he doesn't want to get hurt. [...] All Ryan needs is a good woman, some sort of mother or father figure, and a good psychiatrist and he'll be alright!" He also said that the character has many secrets that will be revealed over time.

In July 2009, it emerges that the character is looking for his mother as he was involved in a gang and killed a gang member with a knife in self-defence. He asks Debra to hide the knife, but she uses it against him. McDermott revealed that one scene, where Ryan and Debra are constantly talking over each other, had to be filmed in several takes. Another scene features McDermott barechested, which prompted him to attend a gym: "I opened up a script after not being here very long and I just thought 'ah ok... I need to get down to the gym', Everyone's a bit vain when they've got to take their clothes off on screen!"

In December 2009, Santer teased about upcoming storylines involving Ryan and his flatmate Janine Butcher (Charlie Brooks), saying: "There's something really interesting with Ryan and Janine [...]. They're both people who don't know how to love. So will they fall in love? And if they do, can they cope with it? Will they understand the alien feelings coursing through their bodies?" McDermott stated in March 2010 that he believed Ryan was the right man for Janine, and that they could be perfect for each other, saying: "Janine's never loved any of the men she's been with before. She has only ever been in it for the money. Ryan understands her and knows why she does the things she does. They both forgive one another's mistakes very easily, and that's why their partnership works."

On 19 June 2011, it was announced that McDermott had quit EastEnders and that his character would exit in a dramatic storyline later in the year. An EastEnders spokesperson said, "We can confirm Neil is leaving EastEnders. It was a mutual decision that was made before Christmas when Neil's contract came up for renewal and we wish him all the best for the future."

=== Returns ===
Ryan made a brief appearance in the episode broadcast on 2 September 2014, after Whitney Dean made contact with him and arranged to meet with him in the park to let him make contact with his daughter. However, when Ryan arrived he saw Whitney with Stacey and decided not to approach them.

In January 2016, Ryan returned as part of Stacey Branning's (Lacey Turner) postpartum psychosis storyline. Ryan's stint concluded with him turning himself in to the police for accidentally killing Rob Grayson. Ryan made another to Albert Square in the episode broadcast on 20 September 2016 to surprise Whitney following his early release from prison. Later in the year, Ryan made his third return of the year for Whitney's wedding, broadcast on 4 November 2016.

In February 2023, Ryan returned as part of a storyline involving Lily's pregnancy. Ryan only appeared in three episodes from 13 February of that year.

== Storylines ==
Ryan first appears on screen on 28 April 2009 (credited as "Man") when he is seen in the park by Whitney Dean (Shona McGarty) and Shirley Carter (Linda Henry). He asks Whitney if she is all right, but she runs off calling him a "creep". Weeks later, he helps Whitney and others escape from a fire started in the café by Nick Cotton (John Altman). Whitney then sees Ryan as a mysterious hero. Whitney's mother, Debra Dean (Ruth Gemmell), turns up at Whitney's house, saying that a man is after her. Whitney demands to know why, and Debra says she has something belonging to him. They fetch it, but when they return home, Ryan is waiting for them; he is the man who is chasing Debra. Ryan reveals to Whitney he is her half-brother and says he killed someone in self-defence, giving the weapon to Debra to hide. He demands it back from Whitney, but she refuses, and later disposes of it in a canal.

Planning to leave Walford, Ryan spots Ronnie Mitchell (Samantha Janus) and asks Whitney about her. He decides to stay, and shares a flat with Janine Butcher (Charlie Brooks). Ronnie subsequently offers Ryan a day's trial at The Queen Victoria public house, during which they kiss and eventually go to Ryan's flat and have sex—but she stresses that it is just a one-off. Ryan then indulges in petty crime, including stealing from Ian Beale's (Adam Woodyatt) café and fish and chip shop. When Chelsea Fox (Tiana Benjamin) wins £2,000 on a scratchcard, Ryan mugs her. Janine finds the money, and tells Chelsea that Ryan mugged her, so Chelsea's father Lucas Johnson (Don Gilet) threatens him, and he returns the money. Despite this, Ryan and Janine soon start an on-off fling with each other. At the same time, Janine teams up with Archie Mitchell (Larry Lamb) to try to take over The Queen Vic. She reveals the plans to Ryan, and the pair plot to ultimately take the pub for themselves, double-crossing Archie in the process. Ryan sees Whitney crying in the Square; she is still in love with Tony King (Chris Coghill), her adoptive mother Bianca Jackson's (Patsy Palmer) onetime boyfriend who is currently in prison for sexually abusing Whitney. Ryan tries to convince Whitney that how Tony had treated her was completely wrong and she storms off; Ryan tells Bianca of Whitney's revelation. Ryan shows his hatred of Tony during the beginning of his trial by glaring at him from across the room; Tony is shocked. When Whitney's witness statement is shown in court, Ryan walks out in disgust when she says she was twelve-years-old when they first had sex. He storms back in calling Tony a monster and tells Whitney that Tony is sick and he will get out of prison when he is an old man.

On Christmas Day 2009, Ryan tells Janine that they are over; later he finds her drunk in the car lot. He tells her that Archie has been murdered, then panics when the police arrive to question everyone. When they question Janine, Ryan doesn't believe that she didn't kill Archie; he says she should win an award for her acting abilities. Ryan comforts Janine when she only gets a Newton's cradle in Archie's will but she says she is not finished. After trying to blackmail Ian, she tells the police that Ian murdered Archie. Ryan is angry with her and says it will draw more attention to herself. He says she makes him sick and storms out. When Janine is arrested after police find Archie's mother's engagement ring in her flat, Ryan protests that she has been set up.

Overdue with the rent, Ryan and Janine use Bianca's son Morgan Jackson-King (Devon Higgs) to raise money, pretending to be collecting for charity, but when Whitney discovers what they've done, she takes the money from them. Janine tells Ryan they should come up with a plan to get Archie's daughter Roxy Mitchell's (Rita Simons) inheritance from her, so Janine urges Ryan to get close to Roxy. However, he decides to end the plan when he tells Janine they should admit their true feelings to each other, and says he is in love with her even though she is the most horrendous human being he has ever known. Janine remains silent, so Ryan walks away. The next day, Ryan packs his bags but Janine tries to tell him he can't leave as he owes six weeks' rent. As he leaves on the tube, she regrets letting him go, follows him onto the train and tells him she loves him. He then finds employment as assistant manager of the bookmakers. However, Janine worries that Ryan will leave when she finds his passport with £500, and as he has no material possessions, she buys him a large television, telling him it is too large to fit in one of his bags so he will be unable to leave.

Ryan and Janine make a bet: Janine must kiss Lucas and Ryan must kiss Stacey Slater (Lacey Turner), and whoever does it first wins. Janine eventually kisses Lucas, much to his surprise and she takes Ryan's "going-away" money as her prize. After Ryan kisses Stacey, Janine reveals it was for a bet, leaving Stacey upset. Disgusted by Janine's cruelty, Ryan splits with her. However, they reunite soon after and go on holiday together. When they return, the couple decide to get married. Janine's brother Ricky Butcher (Sid Owen) throws Ryan a stag party where they get drunk and bond. The next day, Ryan attends his wedding, but Janine stops the service, and admits to Ryan that she almost had an affair as she is scared of commitment. Ryan assures her that he is scared too, and the pair marry anyway. They then attend their reception at The Vic, where Stacey attempts to tell Ryan about his paternity to her daughter, Lily Slater. However, Pat Evans (Pam St Clement) stops her from telling him, just minutes before a fire erupts in the pub (see Queen Vic Fire Week). Everyone leaves safely, except for Stacey and Lily. Ryan rescues the baby and an unconscious Stacey before the pub explodes. Upon seeing her daughter unharmed, Stacey admits to Ryan he is Lily's father. Ryan goes to see Stacey in the hospital when she and Lily recover from the fire, and Stacey tells Ryan she is not asking for anything and offers to let Ryan hold Lily, but Ryan declines and walks out. Then he goes on honeymoon with Janine.

When they return, Stacey tells Max Branning (Jake Wood) that Ryan is Lily's father and has been acting like he does not care. Max confronts Ryan, revealing to Janine that Ryan is the father. He then confronts Stacey saying that he wants nothing to do with his daughter. Stacey then tells Ryan to look at Lily, and he is visibly saddened. Janine later calls social services, saying Stacey is neglecting Lily. The allegation is proved to be false and Stacey attacks Janine. Ryan discovers what happened and stops Janine going to the police, saying she would not get away with it. The next day, Janine assumes Ryan has left her but they later reconcile and agree to forget about the recent events. While Stacey and Janine are in R&R nightclub and then arrested, Ryan is left to look after Lily for the first time. He struggles at first but the next morning tells Janine and Stacey he wants to be a father to Lily. Stacey does not want to let him but Ryan later agrees to pay maintenance and gets a job stealing cars for Phil Mitchell (Steve McFadden), so Stacey lets him hold Lily. On Janine's birthday, Ryan tells her he is getting her a surprise gift but finds out that he is with Stacey, having Lily's birth certificate changed, and Ryan later lies about where he was. They attend a party at the Slaters' house and Janine takes Lily, packs her and Ryan's things and takes Ryan on a trip, saying she wants to celebrate her birthday. Ryan hears Lily in the back of the car and orders Janine to stop but she says she is planning on going to France and never returning. They argue and eventually she stops on a level crossing, refusing to start the car until Ryan admits he cares more about Stacey. However, the barriers then lower and Janine is unable to start the car until the last second and the train just misses the car. Ryan takes Lily and Janine home and explains to Stacey that Janine heard Lily crying so took her to look after her but promises to Stacey he did not know Janine took Lily.

Ryan works as a barman at the newly refurbished The Queen Vic, and when alone with Stacey, they kiss. However, Stacey tells Ryan to forget it happened. Stacey goes missing and Janine stops him visiting her by locking him in The Queen Vic's walk-in fridge. Although Ryan thinks it was accidental and Janine saved him, Pat inadvertently reveals it was deliberate. After Stacey's cousin Kat Moon (Jessie Wallace) allows Ryan to visit Stacey, he realises she is planning to leave and stops her. He reveals he wants to be with Stacey, not Janine and they start an affair after she strips naked for him in the pub cellar. Pat discovers it and tells Janine, who starts to poison Ryan with pills. Eventually he escapes the flat and Stacey finds him as he collapses. Ryan is hospitalised and when he wakes up, Janine admits to overdosing him on sedatives and says she knows about his affair. She says if he loves her, he will not let her go to prison for her actions. Ryan allows Janine to believe he still loves her but then publicly declares his love for Stacey in The Queen Vic. Janine then walks in to see them kissing. She fears she has lost him until she discovers Stacey was Archie's real killer after receiving a taped confession from Lauren Branning (Jacqueline Jossa). Although the recording is wiped, Janine reveals the truth. Ryan wants to be with Stacey regardless and they plan to flee. However, Stacey is unsure of her feelings for Ryan and takes Lily, leaving without him. Ryan visits Janine in hospital, because she stabbed herself in an attempt to frame Stacey. Janine forgives Ryan but he is unable to forgive her so he removes her oxygen tubes and walks out as she struggles to breathe. Pat discovers this and tells Ryan to end the feud. He then gives his wedding ring to Whitney.

When Janine returns to Albert Square, Whitney moves in with her. Ryan tries to convince Whitney that Janine is not her friend but to no avail. Later, Ryan tells Whitney he is leaving Walford for a short time to do some work up North. Before he leaves, Ryan asks Kat to give Whitney a job in The Vic, which she agrees to. When Ryan returns, he is horrified to discover that Whitney has been sexually exploited by Rob Grayson (Jody Latham). He gets Whitney a job at The Vic but she turns it down. He urges her to get tested for sexually transmitted infections, which she agrees to, and to go to the police, which she says she is not yet ready to do.

Ryan starts working as a doorman at R&R. He turns down Lauren when she develops a crush on him and sneaks into his bedroom. She later tries to impress him by dressing up but he rejects her advances. Ryan then starts drug dealing and is sacked by Roxy, but then Phil reinstates him. Ryan misses Lily and realises he is in trouble because of the drugs and when Lauren later comforts him, he kisses her. Weeks later, Lauren's mother Tanya Jessop (Jo Joyner) finds out that Ryan and Lauren are having sex and disapproves of the relationship. When a drugs raid is carried out at The Queen Vic, Ryan is arrested by the police due to Janine alerting them of the drug activities and is later fired from his barman job. Next day later Ryan tries to break up with Lauren for Whitney's sake, but she wishes to carry on in secret. Ryan gets a phonecall from Fatboy (Ricky Norwood), who tells him Rob has found Whitney. Ryan goes to Southend-on-Sea and tracks down Rob. They fight on the pier and they both fall into the sea. The next day, the police pull Rob's body from the sea and Whitney thinks Ryan might be dead until he appears. Having killed Rob during the fight, realising Whitney has told the police the entire story and fearing he will go to prison, Ryan insists that he has to leave, so they say an emotional goodbye and he goes on the run.

In 2014, when Stacey is in prison for murdering Archie, Kat takes Lily (Aine Garvey) to see Stacey, and Whitney talks to Lily about Ryan. Stacey is released and tells Whitney that she wants Lily to have nothing to do with Ryan. Stacey then agrees that Lily needs to meet her father at some point, so Whitney arranges for them to meet at a playground. Ryan arrives late, and Stacey and Lily have already left, so he does not reveal himself.

Two years later in 2016, Whitney contacts Ryan to inform him that Stacey has been sectioned at the hospital after suffering from postpartum psychosis. He arrives at The Queen Vic, where Whitney is looking after Lily, and assures a sleeping Lily that he will be there for her. The following day, Ryan is determined to be a father figure in Lily's life, however Whitney desperately tries to persuade him not to tell her. Whitney later takes Lily to the park to meet Ryan, where Lily states that Ryan is not her father, however he reveals the truth to her. He then arrives at Stacey's house and tells Stacey's fiancé Martin Fowler (James Bye) that he is taking Lily away. After being talked down by Martin and Whitney, Ryan reluctantly hands Lily back over to Martin, but promises Lily that he will return to see her again. Whitney later asks her boyfriend Lee Carter (Danny-Boy Hatchard) and his sister Nancy Carter (Maddy Hill) if Ryan can stay the night at The Queen Vic and the pair reluctantly agree. However, after Whitney and Ryan argue when Whitney suggests that Ryan hand himself in to the police, Ryan steals the money from the safe and flees. This causes a catfight between Whitney and Nancy, as Nancy attempts to call the police on Ryan. The next morning, Whitney contacts Ryan and he asks to meet in the park. Lee and Nancy's father, Mick Carter (Danny Dyer) accompanies Whitney and assures a scared Ryan that he can trust him. It then emerges that Whitney told Mick that Ryan killed Rob, so Whitney and Mick convince Ryan to return the money and hand himself to the police for a lesser charge of manslaughter, to which Ryan agrees on the condition that Whitney and Lily visit him regularly. Whitney shares an emotional goodbye with Ryan as he heads into the police station. Whitney later visits Ryan in prison.

Several months later, Ryan surprises Whitney by returning to Walford. He explains that he has been released due to a lack of evidence and also reveals he is now in a relationship with a prison officer named Helen. Whitney suggests he move in with her and the Carters. However, Ryan declines and proposes that Whitney and Lee move with him to Wakefield. Initially accepting his offer, Whitney later declines as Lee's mother, Linda Carter (Kellie Bright) disapproves of her and Lee moving so far away. Ryan says the offer is always there and that he will keep a room in his house saved for her, Lee and their unborn baby. After sharing yet another emotional goodbye with Whitney, Ryan departs. He returns two months later for Whitney and Lee's wedding. He watches in delight as they get married. Ryan helps Lee deliver a speech dedicated to Whitney before leaving. Ryan later calls Whitney, informing her that he and Helen are engaged. He contacts Whitney in December 2022 to wish her a happy 30th birthday and sends her a large sum of money, which he also sends to Lily (now played by Lillia Turner).

In January 2023, it is revealed that Lily has fallen pregnant at twelve-years-old and she names Sam Mitchell (Kim Medcalf) and Jack Branning's (Scott Maslen) son, Ricky Mitchell (Frankie Day) as the father following a one-night stand. The following month, Whitney frantically reveals this to Ryan during a phone call, despite promising Stacey that she would not tell him yet. Ryan then returns to Walford to confront the Slaters. He asks Stacey why she did not tell him about Lily, and Stacey explains that he was not around when she had a lot going on. He is then reunited with Lily in the café, and he tells her that he would like to start supporting her and the baby financially. He then gives Lily money. Later in The Queen Vic, he has a row with Jack and Sam over Ricky's involvement. It is later revealed that Ryan is conspiring with his wife Helen to fight Stacey in court for full-custody of Lily, so she and the baby can live with them in Wakefield, as Ryan and Helen are unable to have children of their own.

Ryan, Stacey, Sam and Ricky all accompany Lily to her first baby scan. In the waiting area, Ryan suggests to Stacey that Lily and the baby may have a better life away from Walford with him and Helen. Stacey brushes it off, however, the midwife later asks Ryan and Stacey to leave the room when a row erupts between them, leaving Sam and Ricky alone with Lily. Whitney berates Ryan when she finds out about his motive to take Lily away from Stacey. Ryan proposes the idea to Lily without Stacey's permission, but she does not respond immediately. Lily later agrees to move away with Ryan and they inform Stacey together back at the Slater house. When Lily leaves the room, Ryan and Stacey have another argument and Lily orders Ryan to leave when she overhears him badmouthing Stacey's parenting. Ryan then leaves Walford after exchanging some harsh words with Stacey, Kat and Whitney.

Off-screen Ryan manages to patch things up with Lily and invites her to spend Christmas 2023 with him and Helen so that he can meet his granddaughter Charli Slater. However Kat puts a spanner in the works by setting her wedding to Phil to coincide with the Christmas period and asking Lily to be her bridesmaid. Following the breakdown of her relationship with Zack Hudson (James Farrar), Whitney decides she needs a fresh start from Walford and moves to Wakefield in May 2024, taking her newborn daughter Dolly as well as her foster daughter Britney Wainwright (Lola Campbell) with her, to stay with Ryan. In 2025, after Martin is killed, Lily and Charli go to stay with Ryan off screen as Stacey has had a breakdown.

== Reception ==
McDermott was nominated for the Most Popular Newcomer award at the 2010 National Television Awards for his portrayal of Ryan. In 2011, Ryan's love triangle with Stacey and Janine was nominated at the All About Soap Bubble Awards in the category "Best Love Triangle".
