= Tony King (EastEnders) =

Fictional character from the BBC soap opera EastEnders

- EastEnders character
- Portrayed by: Chris Coghill
- Duration: 2008–2009
- First appearance: Episode 3646; 12 September 2008
- Last appearance: Episode 3913; 18 December 2009
- Introduced by: Diederick Santer
In-universe information
- Sons: Leo King

Tony King is a fictional character from the BBC soap opera EastEnders, played by Chris Coghill. He was the partner of established character Bianca Jackson (Patsy Palmer), and a father-figure to her four children. Tony sexually abused Bianca's stepdaughter, Whitney Dean (Shona McGarty), and began grooming her school-friend Lauren Branning (Madeline Duggan), before his predatory nature was uncovered and he was arrested for his crimes. Tony appeared between 12 September and 12 December 2008 and returned in December 2009 to stand trial.

The child sexual abuse storyline marked the first time the subject matter had been broached in a UK soap opera, and was researched and developed with advice and approval from the National Society for the Prevention of Cruelty to Children. The abusive nature of Tony and Whitney's relationship resulted in over 200 complaints being made to the BBC and television regulatory body Ofcom by members of the public, with the storyline deemed "one of the darkest and most disturbing storylines EastEnders has ever attempted" by The Mirror's Beth Neil. The NSPCC however praised the storyline for "helping to raise awareness of the hidden nature of sexual abuse". The storyline also gained EastEnders a Royal Television Society Programme Award in March 2009 in the Soap and Continuing Drama category.

== Creation ==
Tony was first mentioned in EastEnders in April 2008, when Palmer returned as Bianca Jackson following a nine-year absence from the show. It was established that although Tony was currently in prison, he and Bianca were in a relationship, and that he acted as a father-figure to her children Whitney Dean, Liam Butcher (James Forde) and Tiffany Dean (Maisie Smith). It was originally stated that Tony was the biological father of Bianca's youngest son, mixed-race Morgan Jackson-King (Devon Higgs), which raised confusion with viewers when it was later announced that Coghill, who is white, had been cast in the role. The show's producers explained that Tony was not really Morgan's father, and that the reason behind this deception would be revealed soon after his arrival.

Although Tony did not appear in the show until September 2008, his arrival was anticipated from April of that year, when EastEnders executive producer Diederick Santer commented that the series was building a picture of his character, and that it would be interesting to see him on-screen. It was reported on 2 July 2008 that Tony would be arriving in the serial as part of a child sexual abuse storyline involving Whitney. BBC News described the plot as an ongoing "predatory paedophile storyline", noting that this was the first time this subject matter had been tackled by a UK soap opera.

"Programmes like EastEnders are increasingly helping to raise awareness of the hidden nature of sexual abuse. The NSPCC's work with the BBC on the forthcoming EastEnders storyline is aimed at ensuring the portrayal of child abuse accurately reflects the damage it can do to the victim, their family and the wider community. This is vital in persuading people to take action to stop it and encouraging children to speak out."

— John Grounds, NSPCC Director of Communications

An EastEnders spokesperson stated that programme-makers were working in close conjunction with the NSPCC in order to portray the subject matter accurately and sensitively, commenting that the show aims to raise awareness of real-life issues, and has in the past similarly drawn attention to issues such as domestic violence, rape and HIV. John Grounds, the NSPCC's director of communications, praised the soap for raising awareness of the issue.

The storyline was first conceived when EastEnders series consultant Simon Ashdown viewed a documentary about homelessness, featuring a mother and child at a bus stop with nowhere to go. Ashdown questioned what might happen if a child sex offender were to befriend the mother in order to grow closer to the child, and related the scenario to Bianca's return to the soap. BBC Head of Drama John Yorke explained that the idea when presented "drew a sharp intake of breath. Most EastEnders stories that have been good and successful have been the ones that caused the sharp intake of breath, so they're always the kind of stories you look for." Final approval for the storyline was sought from BBC Head of Fiction Jane Tranter on 2 June 2008. Tranter explained that: "I thought it was a fantastically good idea. The big moments in EastEnders, those iconic pieces of television history, tend to be the things that are incredibly near the knuckle, and are actually quite difficult subjects to raise in the context of a family sitting room. [...] Soaps are meant to hold up a mirror to our lives, and sometimes that mirror will show ugly bits, difficult bits, taboo bits. But if a soap doesn't hold up that mirror, then actually, what is it? It will have no depth."

== Development ==
Coghill was cast as Tony on 20 June 2008. He deemed the role the most challenging he had ever played, but hoped that it would help to raise public awareness of child abuse. Of his off-screen relationship with McGarty, Coghill explained that it helped that she does not look or act like a young child, deeming her "fantastic to work with", as well as "very natural, very instinctive and a natural actress", commenting: "There isn't any uncomfortable feeling at all." Having undergone a thorough characterisation session, Coghill began shooting on 30 June 2008, and first appeared on-screen on 12 September 2008.

Tony began grooming Whitney as soon as he met Bianca, ingratiating himself so as to become the family's "hero figure" and "saviour". Coghill elucidated: "The lie that Tony has spun to Whitney is that as soon as she's 16 they'll run away together and start a new life. But Tony's the type of paedophile who preys on younger children. Whitney is beginning to pass her sell-by date with him. [...] He feels like he's losing his little girl but needs to keep Whitney under his control and not speak out." As Tony began to lose interest in Whitney, he started grooming her 14-year-old school-friend Lauren Branning (Madeline Duggan). A show-insider commented that Tony had been getting away with abusing Whitney for years, but was escalating as one young girl was no longer enough to satisfy him.

Tony left the soap on 12 December 2008, after his true nature was exposed. It was announced on 7 September 2009 that he would return to EastEnders to be put on trial. Coghill was pleased to return, believing it right that Tony's story arc should conclude realistically, giving closure to the storyline and continuing to raise awareness of the issue. Santer commented: "One of the unique things about EastEnders is its ability to play stories over months and years. Chris agreeing to come back for these episodes will enable us to continue showing the long-term consequences of Tony's abuse of Whitney and – I hope – continue to do justice to the issue of child sex abuse." Grounds praised Tony's trial, stating that it demonstrated the importance for children of having their abusers brought to justice. Palmer felt that: "If one person out there who's been abused saw that [the legal system] go out of their way to make it easier on the victim – Whitney's evidence is given by video link – it will be worth it."

== Storylines ==
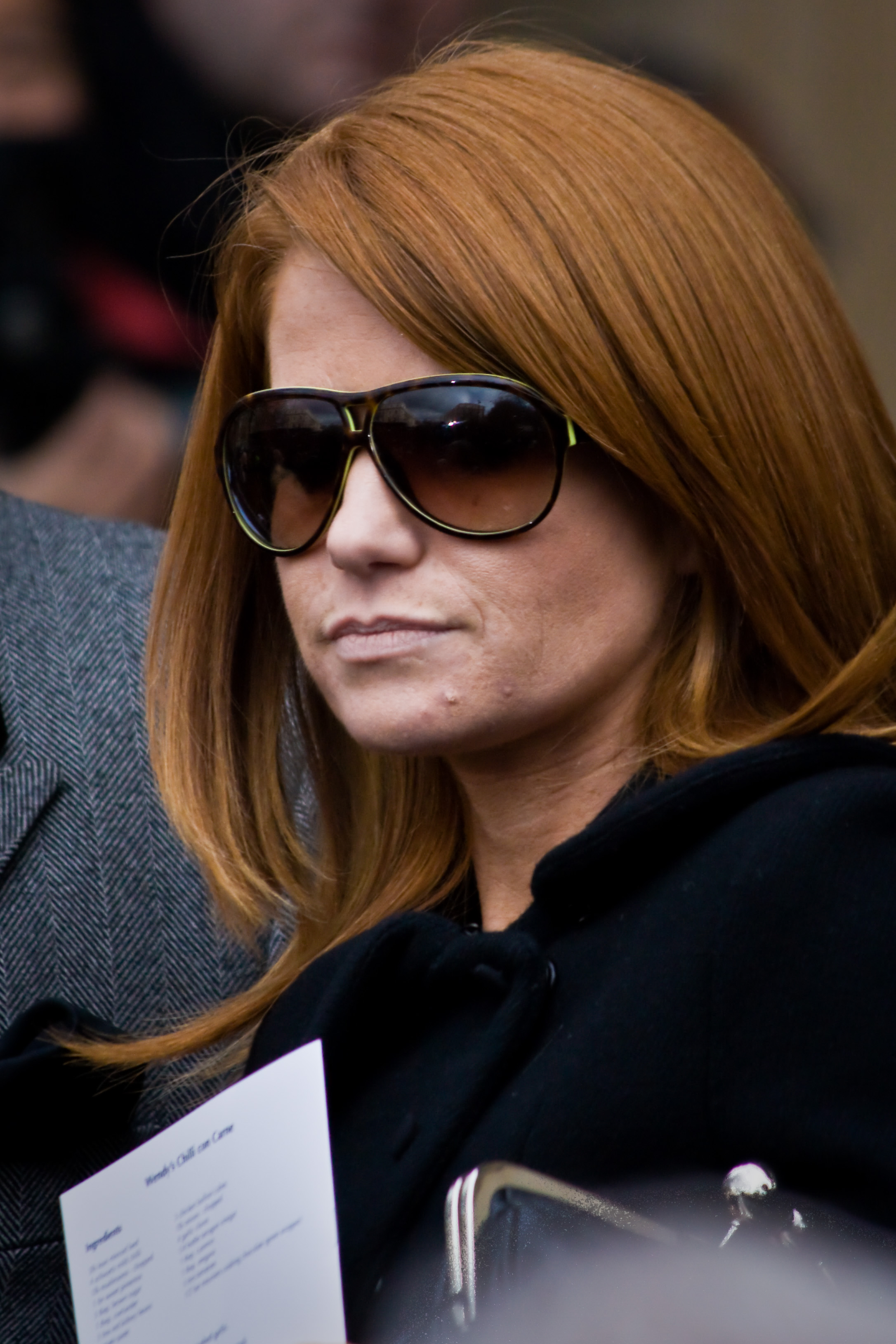
Patsy Palmer plays Bianca, Tony's partner and the adoptive mother of his victim Whitney Dean.

After being released from prison for assaulting a teenage boy who propositioned Whitney Dean (Shona McGarty), Tony joins his partner Bianca Jackson (Patsy Palmer) and her family in Walford, including her son Morgan Jackson-King, whom he has adopted. It is revealed that he is a predatory hebephile who has been grooming and sexually abusing Whitney, Bianca's adopted daughter, since she was 12. He immediately resumes his sexual relationship with Whitney, despite his displeasure at her more adult appearance, insisting she remove her make-up and jewellery. When Whitney gets a role in the school play, Tony is angry about having less time with her, becoming jealous of her co-star Peter Beale (Thomas Law). Tony deceives Whitney into believing they will run away and start a new life together when she turns sixteen. Whitney gives him money she has been keeping for his return, which he gives Bianca as a deposit for a flat. Tony assaults Peter as a result of his growing jealousy, and is nearly reported to the police by Peter's sister Lucy Beale (Melissa Suffield). Whitney convinces Lucy not to go to the police, but not before Lucy tells Bianca what happened. When Bianca angrily tells Tony that Whitney is not a child anymore, he realizes he is no longer attracted to her.

Tony begins grooming Bianca's fourteen-year-old cousin Lauren Branning (Madeline Duggan), supporting her when her mother Tanya Branning (Jo Joyner) is arrested for the attempted murder of her father. He plans to take her to a concert, but Lauren's father Max Branning (Jake Wood) uncovers her hidden clothes and refuses her permission to attend. When Whitney's sixteenth birthday arrives, she books flights so they can run away together. Attempting to foil her plan, Tony steals her passport but it is found and returned. On her birthday, Whitney tells Bianca about her relationship with Tony, believing that they are going to leave together. Horrified, Bianca calls the police, and Tony is arrested. He is later released on bail and visits their home in an attempt to convince Whitney not to give a statement to the police. He is attacked by Bianca's ex-husband Ricky Butcher (Sid Owen) and re-arrested for breaking his bail conditions.

Before his trial, Tony attempts suicide. Whitney tries to visit but is refused, and Bianca sees it as a form of manipulation. Tony repeatedly attempts to contact Whitney by phone, but after the first day of the trial, he flushes the SIM card down the toilet in his cell. When Whitney's brother Ryan Malloy (Neil McDermott) tries to attack Tony in court, Whitney says she will refuse to testify, claiming her witness statement was a lie and she was forced to say it. Bianca explains to Whitney that Tony will be set free and that he will target other children. Tony's barrister, Mrs Taylor (Jacqueline Defferary), cross-examines Whitney, trying to imply that she pursued him for several years, saying she refused to take 'no' for an answer and lied about the accusations. Tony shouts out that he is innocent but Whitney says she trusted him and he abused her, revealing the truth about the relationship. After leaving the courtroom, Whitney gives her barrister, Vivien Easley QC (Geraldine Alexander), a mobile phone with messages from Tony on it. A week later Tony is found guilty of all charges and sentenced to 13 years in custody. He smirks as the verdict is being read out but is taken away with his head in his hands.

Over three years later, Whitney receives a note from Tony via one of his former prison friends, saying that he always loved her. Whitney attempts to visit Tony in prison, but she is told that he killed himself in his cell.

== Reception ==
The BBC and television regulatory body Ofcom received upward of 90 complaints after Whitney's first scenes with Tony aired. However, they ruled that the scenes were not in breach of broadcasting rules.

The Guardian's Aida Edemariam said of the beginning of the storyline: "what is most disturbing, watching [Tony and Whitney's] first scenes together, is not the sexuality of the situation per se, though that is uncomfortable - it's the subtle blackmail with which he keeps her in line. As it's combined with the emotional manipulation native to soaps, the viewer starts to feel a bit bullied, too". Numbers of viewer complaints rose within days to over 200. New Statesman journalist Jeremy Sare commented on the public outrage and defended EastEnders decision to air the storyline, writing:

There may be some justification for the hundreds complaining about these distressing issues being presented in prime time: equally it is courageous for the Beeb to include a scenario which challenges the public’s perception of what is a ‘typical paedophile’. The repellent Tony’s grooming and seduction of his stepdaughter, Whitney, is a much more familiar pattern of abuse than the more commonly held image of predators lurking in parks. [...] The producers of Eastenders, labouring under a welter of tabloid protest and viewers’ complaints, are attempting to make people get past the initial revulsion of the act of abuse and accept the grim fact that ‘paedophiles’ are very often members of the same family.

Sare quoted a BBC spokeswoman as saying: "we appreciate that for some viewers this storyline will have particular resonance and significance. In running it, it's certainly not our intention to cause distress or upset, either to those who've suffered from sexual abuse or their families. Our aim is instead to raise awareness of this very sensitive issue", concluding his article with the summation: "The producers’ dilemma is instructive to children's charities and Ministers alike on how to confront the issue in a digestible manner which can stimulate an objective debate."

The Mirror's Beth Neil branded the plot strand "one of the darkest and most disturbing storylines EastEnders has ever attempted", with critic Jim Shelley deeming it to be a "new low" for EastEnders. Shelley wrote of Whitney's abuse: "You've really got to hand it to EastEnders. Just when you thought the show couldn't get any more miserable, the writers come up trumps and produce a new way of making us depressed - a paedophile storyline. Thanks for that! I realise now this is what the family meal has been missing three nights a week: gathering the telly to watch a grubby, greasyhaired thug drooling over a 15-year-old girl who (as luck would have it) spends her entire life in her school uniform even when she's not at school. And they say family entertainment's dead." Shelley refuted the BBC's claims that the storyline had educational value as "totally bogus", observing that "At 7.30 or 8pm, the "action" has to be so coded as to be pointless". Deborah Orr, writing for The Independent, similarly disagreed with the BBC's statement that the storyline was part of EastEnders' "rich heritage of tackling difficult social issues", writing that:

Actually, it's part of its rich heritage of leaping in to some horrific subject without any background or build-up at all. The implication is that Tony, the villain, had been grooming the child for some time before he went to prison, when she was only 12. But such a thing really would be too real, and too controversial, so the viewer only gets to see the result of those hinted-at dark machinations. It might be a public service to dramatise the manner in which a sex offender might worm his way into a vulnerable family. But such a storyline would have to be explored carefully and over a long period. All that this little adventure in broadcasting can possibly deliver is the message that a paedophile in the heart of the home is not a good thing. Who needs to be educated about this?

The Guardian's Julie Raeside has questioned: "Is this latest sexual abuse storyline a good thing to position in a pre-watershed soap opera, or should the EastEnders storyliners stick to a less controversial brand of misery?" However, in contrast to public and media dissent, the NSPCC's director of communications, John Grounds, has praised the storyline for "helping to raise awareness of the hidden nature of sexual abuse", deeming it to be "vital in persuading people to take action to stop it and encouraging children to speak out." Episodes from the storyline were submitted to the Royal Television Society Programme Awards 2008 for a panel to judge in the category Soap and Continuing Drama. EastEnders was presented with the award in March 2009, beating Coronation Street and The Bill. Members of the judging panel described the submitted episodes as "the culmination of a particularly challenging and controversial storyline which the production team, writers and cast pulled off triumphantly." In addition, the storyline was nominated for Best Storyline at the 2009 Inside Soap Awards and the character was nominated for the Villain of the Year award at the 2009 British Soap Awards.

== See also ==
- List of soap opera villains
