= Chelsea Fox =

Fictional character from EastEnders

- EastEnders character
- Zaraah Abrahams as Chelsea Fox (2024)
- Portrayed by: Tiana Benjamin (2006–2010); Zaraah Abrahams (2020–present)
- Duration: 2006–2010, 2020–present
- First appearance: Episode 3145; 2 May 2006
- Introduced by: Kate Harwood (2006); Jon Sen (2020)
In-universe information
- Other names: Chelsea Atkins
- Occupation: Waitress; Beautician; Shop assistant; Barmaid
- Father: Lucas Johnson
- Mother: Denise Fox
- Stepfather: Owen Turner; Kevin Wicks; Jack Branning
- Stepmother: Trina Johnson
- Half-brothers: Jordan Johnson; Raymond Dawkins
- Half-sisters: Libby Fox
- Husband: Gray Atkins (2021–2022)
- Sons: Jordan Fox
- Stepsons: Mackenzie Atkins
- Stepdaughters: Mia Atkins
- Grandmothers: Emerald Fox
- Aunts: Kim Fox; Daphne Fox; Gloria MacDonald
- Nephews: JJ Johnson
- First cousins: Pearl Fox; Mica Fox

Chelsea Fox (also Atkins) is a fictional character from the BBC soap opera EastEnders, played by Tiana Benjamin from 2006 to 2010, and then Zaraah Abrahams from 2020 onwards. Benjamin was cast in the role and left the Harry Potter film series to appear in the soap; she made her first appearance as Chelsea in episode 3147, broadcast on 5 May 2006, when she is introduced as part of the all-female Fox family alongside her mother, Denise Fox (Diane Parish), and half-sister, Libby Fox (Belinda Owusu).

Chelsea is introduced as feisty, vain, and indulged. She was featured in love triangles with Grant Mitchell (Ross Kemp) and Jane Collins (Laurie Brett), and with Sean Slater (Rob Kazinsky) and her stepsister Carly Wicks (Kellie Shirley). Later, she and Carly's half-brother Dean Wicks (Matt Di Angelo) frame Sean for an attack on Patrick Trueman (Rudolph Walker) as revenge, leading to their imprisonment. Other storylines included an addiction to cocaine, a relationship with Jack Branning (Scott Maslen), and discovering that her father Lucas Johnson (Don Gilet) was a serial killer who framed Denise for his crimes and led everyone to believe that she committed suicide. Benjamin announced her departure from the show in April 2010, and she left in episode 4047, broadcast on 5 August 2010. In October 2020, the character's return was announced alongside Abrahams' casting. Chelsea returns in episodes 6188/6189, broadcast on 25 December 2020.

Since her return, Chelsea's storylines have included reconciling with Lucas, in order to use him for smuggling; marrying Gray Atkins (Toby-Alexander Smith) and later discovering that he murdered several residents, including his previous wife Chantelle Atkins (Jessica Plummer); forming a friendship with Whitney Dean (Shona McGarty); entering a relationship with Ravi Gulati (Aaron Thiara) which ends when she discovers that he was romantically involved with Denise and killed his adoptive father, Ranveer Gulati (Anil Goutam); supporting Denise during a mental breakdown; feuding with Penny Branning (Kitty Castledine) over a managerial position at Peggy's wine bar, leading Chelsea to overbook the bar as revenge and accidentally cause a crowd collapse and crush; and coping with her son Jordan (Jahsaiah Williams) being accidentally run over by Ian Beale (Adam Woodyatt).

== Creation and development ==
=== Introduction ===
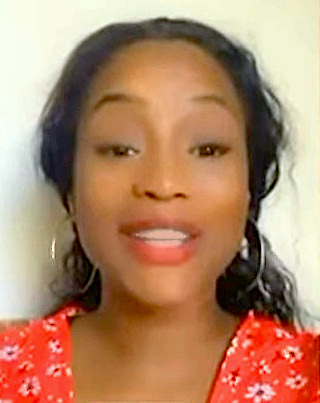
Tiana Benjamin was cast as Chelsea in 2006; she left the role in 2010.

On 12 January 2006, an official BBC press report announced the introduction of a new character to EastEnders, Chelsea Fox. Chelsea was due to be part of a new, all female family joining the show, with Chelsea's mother Denise and her sister Libby (played by Diane Parish and Belinda Owusu respectively) completing the clan. The role was cast to Tiana Benjamin, who was 21 at the time. Benjamin has revealed she was the second Fox to be cast, and on her final audition, she had a workshop and met Diane Parish there. Owusu was cast at a later date. Of her casting, Benjamin said "I've been a big fan of EastEnders since I was little and I'm very excited to join the show. I've always really admired Diane [Parish] and I can't wait to work with her – it really hasn't sunk in yet! [...] It's one of those jobs that's unlike any other. There's a lot that changes when you take on something as big as EastEnders. I [am] really happy and genuinely excited to be a part of the show." She added that the three actors who play the Fox family have a bond, commenting "We all respect and understand each other, and manage to have a good time while we're filming too. I felt that we clicked from our first few scenes together." Benjamin quit her role as Angelina Johnson in the Harry Potter film series in order to take the part. Chelsea made her first screen appearance in May 2006 and was the first of the Fox family to be seen by viewers.

=== Departure ===
In April 2010, it was announced that Benjamin had chosen to leave the show to pursue other projects. Of her decision, she said "I have had an amazing time at EastEnders and this has been a very difficult decision for me to make but now seems like the right time to move on and leave Chelsea behind even through she's been such a fantastic character to play." Her final episode was broadcast on 5 August 2010.

=== Recast and return ===
It was announced in October 2020 that the character would be reintroduced with the role recast to actress Zaraah Abrahams. The announcement followed the news that Don Gilet would reprise his role as Chelsea's father, Lucas Johnson. Abrahams expressed her excitement at joining the cast, while Jon Sen, the show's executive producer, praised Abrahams' casting and commented, "When Chelsea was around, trouble was never far away and that is as true as ever when she returns to Walford later this year".

== Storylines ==
=== 2006–2010 ===
Upon Chelsea's arrival, she is seduced by Grant Mitchell (Ross Kemp), unaware he is dating her to make Jane Collins (Laurie Brett) jealous. However, when Denise uncovers the truth, Grant ends the relationship. Chelsea becomes friends with Dean Wicks (Matt Di Angelo) and initially works for Billy Mitchell (Perry Fenwick) at his video shop, but is sacked. She then finds employment at Tanya Branning's (Jo Joyner) salon, Booty, and falls for Sean Slater (Robert Kazinsky). However, Sean is promiscuous and pursues other women, including Tanya and Carly Wicks (Kellie Shirley), while Chelsea wants a serious relationship. Attempting to keep Sean away from Carly, Chelsea sets her up on a date with Warren Stamp (Will Mellor), who tries to assault Carly. Sean rescues her and animosity between the girls escalates, particularly when Sean dumps Chelsea for Carly. Carly's brother, Deano, is attracted to Chelsea and, using this to her advantage, she and Deano sabotage Carly and Sean's relationship. When Patrick Trueman (Rudolph Walker) is attacked, Chelsea and Deano frame Sean, stealing CCTV evidence that clears Sean, but Carly finds it and gives it to the police. Sean is released, and the police charge Chelsea and Deano with perverting the course of justice. Sean gets revenge by cutting Chelsea's hair while she sleeps and having Deano beaten by a gang of thugs. She and Deano are sentenced to six months imprisonment and are released after three.

Chelsea befriends Shabnam Masood (Zahra Ahmadi) in hopes to get closer to Jalil Iqbal (Jan Uddin), but is devastated when he chooses Shabnam. Helped by her sister, Libby, Chelsea traces her father, Lucas Johnson (Don Gilet), who left her and Denise 20 years ago. She confronts him, revealing that she is his daughter but leaves before he responds. Lucas reappears and Chelsea is reluctant to see him but eventually agrees to go out for a birthday meal. However, she leaves on discovering that she has a half-brother, Jordan (Michael-Joel David Stuart). She buys drugs from Sean and steals money from work to buy more, but gets beaten up by a group of girls. Tanya fires her and Patrick catches her taking cocaine. He locks her in her room and calls Lucas to help. When he arrives, Chelsea has escaped through the bedroom window. Lucas finds her in R&R nightclub, high on cocaine, and takes her home. She falls in love with Theo Kelly (Rolan Bell), but upon dating, Chelsea feels excluded from Theo and his university friends. She later cheats on him with a footballer named Ellis Prince (Michael Obiora), who offers her drugs. A guilt-ridden Chelsea confesses her infidelity to Theo and despite his forgiving her, insists she cannot be with him and ends the relationship. She resumes her relationship with Ellis but Lucas finds the drugs Ellis gave her and confronts Chelsea. She runs away with Ellis, leaving a note for her family but returns on Libby's birthday.

Chelsea and Roxy Mitchell (Rita Simons) both pursue Dr. Al Jenkins (Adam Croasdell), becoming rivals as the doctor is dating them both secretly. Chelsea assists Jordan in his protest to get a tree planted in Trina's memory and manages to win Al. However, just before Chelsea and Al get together, Roxy turns up at his office dressed as a nurse, so Chelsea leaves, embarrassed. Despite this, when Roxy inherits The Queen Victoria public house, she employs Chelsea as a barmaid. Denise sets Chelsea up on a blind date with an associate of Lucas's called Matthew, but Chelsea does not enjoy the date and tells Jack Branning (Scott Maslen) she wants to leave. While she is in the toilet, Jack tells Matthew that Chelsea has a boyfriend so he leaves. Chelsea and Jack start dating and she returns to work at the salon, now named Roxy's. When Jack is shot and hospitalised, Chelsea declares her love for him and stays with him in hospital but Jack ends it as he is still in love with his ex-girlfriend and Roxy's sister, Ronnie Mitchell (Samantha Womack). Later, Chelsea and her colleague Amira Masood (Preeya Kalidas) worry that they are pregnant and take pregnancy tests. Amira's test is negative but Chelsea's test comes back positive. Chelsea decides to keep the baby but decides not to tell Jack, although she is scared of the prospect of becoming a single mother. She takes the test again and realises that she is not pregnant. She tells Amira that it was her test that was positive and promises to keep her secret when she leaves Walford after learning that her husband Syed (Marc Elliott) is gay.

When Owen's body is discovered buried under the Square, Denise is taken for questioning. Chelsea thinks that Denise may have killed Trina and Owen, as Lucas had told her that Denise was hiding Trina's bracelet in her bag. Chelsea tells Libby about the bracelet, and after Denise is released without charge, they see her leaving the Square alone and receive a text message from her saying "I'm sorry", unaware that Lucas killed Owen and confessed to Denise, took her to a canal and strangled her, sending the text message before he threw the phone in the canal. The police tell the family that Denise's car has been found by the canal and a body is pulled from the water along with Denise's mobile phone. Chelsea offers to go with Lucas to identify the body but she is unable to go in so he goes in alone and identifies it as Denise, leaving Chelsea devastated. Whilst celebrating Libby's birthday, Denise walks in, revealing that she is not dead but that Lucas has been keeping her prisoner, and that he killed Trina and Owen. Lucas enters and confirms that Denise is telling the truth and takes the family hostage, but when Jordan arrives, they escape and Lucas is arrested. Chelsea decides to move to Spain with Libby's grandmother, Liz Turner (Kate Williams), as people in Walford will only ever think of her as the daughter of a murderer. Denise initially argues with Chelsea about this, but eventually agrees, encouraging Libby to go too for a holiday before returning to university. After leaving drinks in The Queen Victoria pub, Chelsea, Libby, and Liz leave Walford in the back of a taxi.

In November 2011, Amira states that Chelsea is living in Málaga, Spain. In May 2014, Denise goes to Spain with Libby to celebrate Chelsea's birthday. In August 2015, when Libby returns to Walford for her birthday, Chelsea calls her, urging her to tell Denise something, but Libby cannot go through with it. In December 2015, Libby reveals to Denise that Jordan (now played by Joivan Wade) briefly lived with her and Chelsea in Spain; however he caused an endless amount of trouble for them, so Chelsea kicked him out.

=== 2020–present ===
In December 2020, Denise is surprised to see Chelsea (now played by Abrahams) with her father Lucas, who has recently been released from prison. Chelsea later returns to Albert Square, where she reveals to Denise that she has been in communication with Lucas for months and is upset with Denise for not telling her about her son, Raymond Dawkins. After an argument with Denise, Chelsea leaves with Lucas. Patrick, in cooperation with Raymond's father Phil Mitchell (Steve McFadden), meets Chelsea at The Queen Victoria public house to inquire about Lucas' whereabouts. Later that day, Lucas is attacked in front of Chelsea after they leave a restaurant. While Phil is initially blamed for the attack, it is revealed that Chelsea's ex-boyfriend Caleb Malone (Ben Freeman) is responsible. Chelsea is indebted to Caleb after fleecing him and plans to use Lucas to smuggle drugs for Caleb. Chelsea arranges a trip to Spain with Lucas, intending to use him for drug smuggling, but the plan fails. Denise confronts Lucas about upsetting Chelsea, and they both go missing. Chelsea finds blood in Lucas's flat and fears that Lucas has harmed Denise, but she later discovers that Caleb has taken Denise instead. Denise discovers Chelsea's plan and reluctantly agrees to help her trick Lucas into drug trafficking. They attempt to persuade Lucas to follow Chelsea to Ibiza, but he later discovers their true intentions. Lucas vows to kill Caleb but is stopped by Chelsea's threat to abandon Lucas if he proceeds to do so, having not forgiven him for faking Denise's death, and warns him that Caleb will kill her if he doesn't help her. When Denise's boyfriend and Chelsea's ex-lover Jack learns of Chelsea's scheme, she tries to seduce him to prevent him from reporting her to the police. Lucas agrees to do the job but changes his mind. However he is arrested after being caught, and Chelsea later tips the police off when Caleb asks her to meet him, and he is arrested.

Chelsea enters a relationship with lawyer Gray Atkins (Toby-Alexander Smith), which is met with strong opposition from his former mother and father-in-law, Karen Taylor (Lorraine Stanley) and Mitch Baker (Roger Griffiths). Throughout their relationship, Chelsea lives extravagantly off Gray's money and shows little interest in bonding with his children, Mia (Mahalia Malcolm) and Mackenzie (Isaac Lemonius). Their relationship ends when Chelsea witnesses Gray's volatile behavior and refuses to endure his mistreatment. Chelsea soon discovers she is pregnant and plans to have an abortion, but she is stopped by Gray's fling Whitney Dean (Shona McGarty), who accompanies her to an abortion clinic. After a scan reveals that she is further along than expected, Chelsea decides to keep the baby. She initially plans to raise the child alone but is encouraged by Whitney to inform Gray. When Gray learns about the pregnancy, he agrees to have no involvement but later decides he wants to co-parent. Gray and Chelsea become engaged, but on their wedding day, Whitney reveals that Gray had killed his previous wife Chantelle (Jessica Plummer) through domestic violence. Despite this revelation, Chelsea is manipulated by Gray and proceeds with the wedding. Later, Chelsea uncovers the truth about Gray's abuse of Chantelle when Whitney sends her screenshots of Chantelle's online posts about the abuse before her death. Determined to leave Gray, Chelsea steals money from Ruby Allen's (Louisa Lytton) nightclub Ruby's, and plans to flee to Ibiza, but is stopped in her tracks by Gray. During their confrontation, her waters break, and she is rushed to the hospital where she goes into premature labor. Gray supports her through the delivery, and she names their son Jordan Atkins, after her half-brother who had since died from a heroin overdose. Chelsea decides to stay with Gray for temporary support and she orchestrates a plan with Whitney and Chantelle's former fling Kheerat Panesar (Jaz Deol) to incriminate Gray for his crimes.

Chelsea is horrified by Gray's control over her and decides to secretly register Jordan's birth certificate without his knowledge. However, she faces a challenge when she discovers her passport has expired. With Kheerat's help, she obtains a new passport, only to find out that Gray has already registered Jordan's birth. As Chelsea develops Stockholm syndrome, she turns against Whitney and Kheerat when they try to help her. After Gray is hospitalised following a fight with Kheerat, Chelsea regains her confidence and becomes repulsed by him. It is soon revealed that Gray had murdered Tina Carter (Luisa Bradshaw-White) and buried her body beneath The Argee Bharjee. Gray then takes Jordan from the hospital with plans to flee Walford. When Chelsea finds him, he tries to persuade her to leave with him. During their conversation, Chelsea questions Gray about Chantelle's death, and he confesses to killing her, though he claims it was an accident. Chelsea pretends to forgive Gray but secretly records his confession and calls the police. When Chelsea accidentally drops the phone, Gray realises that he has inadvertently confessed to the police. He attacks her, choking her and attempting to stab her, but Chelsea fights back and tries to escape. Gray flees when the police arrive and is later arrested after Whitney and Mitch prevent him from committing suicide by jumping off a railway bridge. To protect Jordan from Gray's reputation, Chelsea decides to put him up for adoption, but Denise intervenes to stop her. Whitney offers to move in with Chelsea to help care for Jordan, but they discover Gray has fallen behind in paying the rent, leading to their eviction.

Chelsea moves back in with Patrick and her aunt Kim Fox (Tameka Empson), and begins working for Sam Mitchell (Kim Medcalf) after she takes over Ruby's nightclub and renames it Peggy's. Chelsea later moves back into Gray's house with Whitney, and she also allows Mitch's nephews, Finlay (Ashley Byam) and Felix Baker (Matthew James Morrison), to live there alongside Whitney's boyfriend Zack Hudson (James Farrar). Chelsea becomes close to Ravi Gulati (Aaron Thiara), unaware that he is using her to make Denise jealous. Chelsea has a brief fling with Keanu Taylor (Danny Walters) much to the annoyance of his ex-girlfriend Sharon Watts (Letitia Dean). Chelsea ends it when she realises that Keanu still has feelings for Sharon. Chelsea becomes close to Ravi once again and they resume their fling, but he is only using her to intercept Jack's criminal investigation of him. When Ravi is arrested for possession of stolen goods, Chelsea stands by him and offers him a false alibi. Denise later reveals her previous affair with Ravi to Jack, who then exposes it to Chelsea. Chelsea also realises that Ravi has been using her and ends their relationship, though they later reconcile. During their housewarming party, Denise reveals that Ravi had murdered his adoptive father Ranveer (Anil Goutam), and she ends their relationship once again. Chelsea supports Denise through her psychosis diagnosis and worries for Denise's safety when she disappears with her stepdaughter Amy Mitchell (Ellie Dadd). She is found and agrees to commit herself into a mental health facility. On Denise's release, after Jack's affair with Stacey Slater (Lacey Turner) is exposed by Martin Fowler (James Bye) at a family barbecue, Chelsea slaps Stacey then leaves with Denise. Chelsea is convinced by Yolande Trueman (Angela Wynter) to have Jordan baptised. Chelsea consults Pastor Clayton (Howard Saddler) but is unaware that he has sexually assaulted Yolande. During Jordan's baptism, Yolande leaves after being secretly groped by Pastor Clayton, and she later reveals this to the Fox-Truemans. Chelsea begins a brief friendship with Jack's daughter Penny Branning (Kitty Castledine), which turns into a feud when Penny shafts Chelsea to become the bar manager at Peggy's.

Gray decides to sell his house to Teddy Mitchell (Roland Manookian), leaving Chelsea and Jordan homeless, and she returns to live with Patrick and Yolande. Chelsea and Penny continue to feud as Penny enjoys making Chelsea work excessively. During the Notting Hill Carnival celebrations, Penny decides to host a Caribbean themed night at Peggy's. Chelsea decides to get revenge on Penny and oversells tickets, exceeding Peggy's capacity. Peggy's becomes overcrowded, causing a stampede that almost kills Amy and Lauren Branning (Jacqueline Jossa). Despite knowing that Penny is innocent, Chelsea allows her to take the blame for the incident, but struggles and confesses to Denise. Denise agrees to keep the secret but eventually reveals it to the Branning family. Despite this, Chelsea refuses to confess to the police, fearing that she will end up in prison and miss out on Jordan's life. However, following a conversation with Amy, Chelsea realises the impact of her actions and decides to come forward to the police. Before Chelsea can confess, one of the stampede victims wakes from a coma. Jack convinces Penny to take the blame, believing she will face less severe charges than Chelsea. Not long after, Chelsea's relationship with Denise becomes fractured when it is revealed that Denise has been sleeping with Ravi. Chelsea and Denise begin a feud and she goes to live with Jack, which upsets Denise. They soon call a truce and Chelsea encourages Denise to pursue Ravi, but Denise chooses to reunite with Jack.

Chelsea struggles to cope with motherhood, and during Vicki Fowler (Alice Haig) and Ross Marshall’s (Alex Walkinshaw) wedding reception, she loses her temper and shouts at Jordan (Jahsaiah Williams), causing him to run away. Jordan is accidentally hit by a car driven by Ian Beale (Adam Woodyatt). She is devastated when doctors inform her that Jordan may be left paralysed as a result of his injuries. She is also left further devastated by Denise's diagnosis of acute myeloid leukaemia. Chelsea lashes out at Libby when she contacts Gray's grandmother, Sheila Atkins (Sheila Ruskin), who had sent Jordan money, but reluctantly gets in contact with her when she begins struggling financially. Her aunt, Kim, is horrified to learn that Sheila is in touch with Chelsea. However, Chelsea is adamant that she trusts Sheila and offers her the chance to visit Jordan whenever she likes. Denise later confronts Sheila and tells her to stay away. Ian begs Chelsea to admit some responsibility for the accident by acknowledging that she failed in her duty of care, but she refuses. Eventually Chelsea tells Ian that she will testify on his behalf at court. However, she arrives late, and Ian is sentenced to eight months' imprisonment. Overcome with guilt, she reaches out to Sheila for support and offers financial help to Ian's mother, Kathy Beale (Gillian Taylforth) for his appeal. Unbeknownst to Chelsea, Sheila is secretly in contact with Gray, and takes Jordan to visit him in prison. Chelsea later discovers this from Kathy, causing her to confront Sheila and forbid her from seeing Jordan. Gray and Sheila formulate a plan for Sheila to abduct Jordan and take him abroad by manipulating Ian, who is in the same prison as Gray into calling Chelsea in for a visit. Gray causes a riot which causes the prison to go on lockdown, trapping Chelsea so she cannot intervene. Sheila snatches Jordan from the community centre while he is being looked after by Kim and her daughter Pearl (Arayah Harris-Buckle), and takes him to the airport. Kim and a frail Denise rush there to confront Sheila, who is then apprehended by the police.

== Reception ==
In 2021, Abrahams was longlisted for "Best Newcomer" for the Inside Soap Awards for her role as Chelsea. That same year, Laura-Jayne Tyler from Inside Soap wrote "We love Chelsea. She must be protected at all costs", adding that she would lose her mind if Chelsea was murdered by Gray at Christmas. Tyler praised the character further in 2022, writing, "The reintroduction of Chelsea has been a triumph for EastEnders. Star Zaraah Abrahams has seamlessly steered her character from 'proper madam' to a new mum navigating the challenges of life as a single parent; a far cry from the woman who plotted to use her killer dad for drug-trafficking! We love the sisterhood with Whitney too – and can't wait to see what life throws at them next."
