= Michael-Joel David Stuart =

British actor (born 1997)

Michael-Joel Stuart
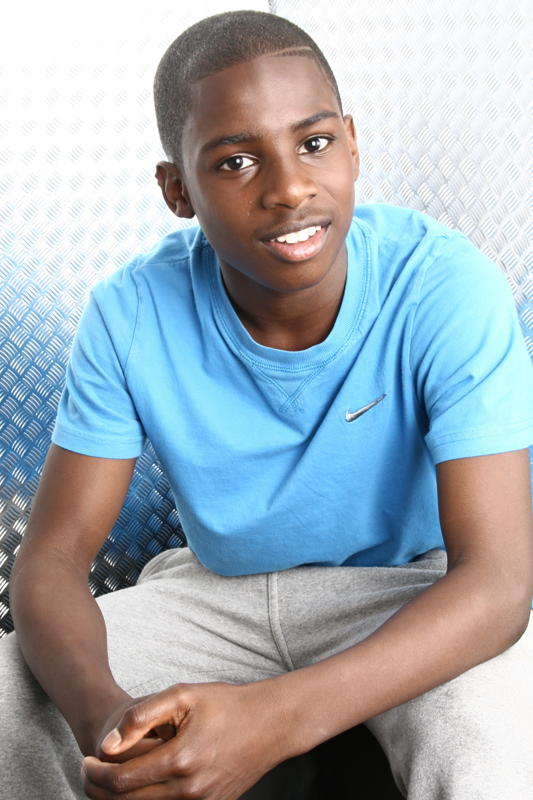
- Born: 29 November 1997 (age 28); London, England
- Occupation: Actor
- Years active: 2006–2012
- Notable work: EastEnders (2008–10)
- Website: mjstuart.wordpress.com

Michael-Joel David Stuart (born 29 November 1997) is a former English actor.

Stuart made his television debut in the BBC's award-winning drama production Shoot the Messenger in 2006. He also performed as young Sunny in the West-End musical Daddy Cool and as young Simba in the West-End musical The Lion King. In 2007, he played Buckwheat in the movie Mister Lonely by Harmony Korine. Between May 2008 and December 2010, he appeared as Jordan Johnson, the son of Lucas Johnson and the half-brother of Chelsea Fox, in the BBC soap opera EastEnders.
