= Rolan Bell =

British actor

- Born: Rolan Bell; 17 October 1983 (age 43); Chiswick, London, England
- Occupation: Actor
- Years active: 2006–present
- Spouse: Sophia Bell
- Children: 2
- Awards: Best Villain - UK pantomime association - 2022 Laurence Olivier Award Nominee- Best Actor in supporting role - 2015

Rolan Alfonso Bell (born 17 October 1983) is a Laurence Olivier Award nominated British actor who was born in West London, of Jamaican and Nigerian origin. He became known for appearing in the BBC One television soap opera EastEnders as Theo Kelly in 2009, and the role of Sgt King (Kingy) in the BBC drama Our Girl.

He is currently playing the part of Ike Turner in the musical Tina at the Aldwych Theatre in the West End. Prior to this, he played the part of Robert in The Play That Goes Wrong at the Duchess Theatre.

== Background and career ==
Bell was born in London, England, to Jamaican parents (the second oldest of their seven children). He began his training as an actor in 2000 at Hammersmith and West London College on a two-year performing arts course, before going on to the Drama Centre London. Bell was first seen professionally in Doctors in 2006 and also appeared in a number of theatre productions, including a stage adaptation of The Harder They Come in which he played the lead role, Jimmy Cliff. He has played the role of Scar in The Lion King and the lead Fela Kuti in the Broadway show Fela! in December 2010.

Bell has also appeared as Coalhouse Walker Jr in Ragtime, the Musical. He also had the role of Britney in the We Will Rock You world arena tour 2013. For his performance in the West End production of Memphis The Musical, he was nominated for an Olivier Award for Best Actor in a Supporting Role in a Musical in 2015.

Bell took a break from the West End to appear in BBC's military drama series Our Girl, alongside Michelle Keegan as "Kingy".

In 2022, Bell played the role of Robert in the West Ends The Play That Goes Wrong.

Currently, he is playing Ike Turner in the west Ends Aldwych Theatre in the musical Tina.

== Panto ==
Bell played Silly Billy in the pantomime Jack and The Beanstalk at the Cambridge Arts Theatre in December 2012, when Hugh Homan commented in The Stage: "Rolan Bell as Silly Billy is superb at involving the audience." More recently, Bell played "Abananzar" in Aladdin where he was awarded "Best Villain" at the UK Pantomime Awards in 2022.

== Voice-over artist ==
Bell has featured on many successful advertising campaigns as a voice-over artist.
