= Chris Coghill =

English actor (born 1975)

- Born: Christopher Coghill; 11 April 1975 (age 51); Prestwich, Greater Manchester England
- Occupations: Actor, screenwriter
- Years active: 1999–present
- Spouse: Lisa Faulkner (m. 2005; div. 2011)
- Children: 1

Christopher Coghill (born 11 April 1975) is an English actor from Prestwich, having had roles in Shameless, Burn It, Hotel Babylon, The Bill, New Tricks, Doctors, Holby City, Heartbeat, Secret Diary of a Call Girl, Waterloo Road and Cold Feet, and as Tony King in EastEnders. He most recently portrayed Kev Townsend in Emmerdale.

== Career ==
Coghill has appeared in many television programmes such as HolbyBlue, Shameless, Burn It, Hotel Babylon, The Bill, New Tricks, Doctors, Holby City, Heartbeat, Secret Diary of a Call Girl, Waterloo Road and Cold Feet. He has also appeared in films such as Someone Else, The Banker, Molly's Idle Ways, Slide and 24 Hour Party People.

In 2008, Coghill was cast in EastEnders in the controversial role of Tony King, Bianca Jackson's boyfriend. Over the course of three months, it emerged that the character had been having a relationship with Bianca's stepdaughter Whitney Dean for three years, starting when Whitney was just 12-years old, and was also seen 'grooming' Lauren Branning. The storyline ended in December 2008 when Whitney told Bianca, who then told the police, and Tony was arrested, thus ending Coghill's three-month stint in the show. Coghill reprised the role for the character's trial, which was screened in December 2009. After leaving EastEnders, Coghill noted that his storyline in the show had affected his career and was finding it more difficult to find roles. Coghill next appeared as ambulance driver Bobby Sheridan in the medical drama series The Royal, in 2008.

In 2016, Coghill appeared in BBC One drama series Moving On. He appeared in series 4 of Line of Duty on BBC One in 2017.

As of 2025, he is currently appearing in Emmerdale playing Kev Townsend.

== Personal life ==
Coghill married actress Lisa Faulkner in April 2005, having met her on the set of Burn It. Their wedding was held at Pembroke Lodge, in Richmond Park, London, and they honeymooned in Malaysia. The couple have an adopted daughter. They separated in 2011.

== Awards and nominations ==
- 2003 Royal Television Society North West Awards, Best Performance in a Network Drama, for Burn It
- 2003 British Academy Television Award for Best New Writer, for Clocking Off
- 2009 British Soap Awards for Villain of the Year, for Tony King (EastEnders)

== Filmography ==
=== Films ===
Year	Film	Role	Notes
2002	24 Hour Party People	Bez	
2004	The Banker	Smiling Man	Short film
2006	Someone Else	Matt	
2009	Nowhere Boy	Record Dealer	
2010	Freedom Day	Vince	Short film
2010	Honeymooner	Ben	
2011	Weekender		Writer
2011	Junkhearts	Banker	
2013	Spike Island	Uncle Hairy	Writer

=== TV ===
Year	Show	Role	Notes	Credit
1999	Cold Feet	Zac	1 episode: #2.4	
2001	Heartbeat	Des	1 episode: The Long Weekend	Christopher Coghill
2002	Holby City	Ash Hillier	1 episode: Sweet Love Remembered	
2003	Doctors	Rob White	1 episode: Cave Man	
2003	Burn It	Carl Redmond	1 episode: #1.6	
2004	New Tricks	Christopher Wells	1 episode: #1.6	Christopher Coghill
2004	Early Doors	Chris	1 episode: #2.6	Christopher Coghill
2005	Legless			
2005–2006	Shameless	Craig Garland	Recurring: 5 episodes	
2006	The Bill	Matt Finney	1 episode: #385	Christopher Coghill
2006	Magnolia	Terry		
2007	Hotel Babylon	Dan Edwards	1 episode: #2.7	
2007	Waterloo Road	Shaun	1 episode #3.7	Christopher Coghill
2007–2008	HolbyBlue	Roger Cooper	Recurring: 3 episodes	Christopher Coghill
2008	Doctors	Mark Sturridge	1 episode: Walking Wounded	Christopher Coghill
2008	Secret Diary of a Call Girl	Kai	1 episode: #2.1	
2008–2009	EastEnders	Tony King	Regular role	
2008–2009	The Royal	Bobby Sheridan	Recurring: 4 episodes	Christopher Coghill
2009	Who'll Age Worst	—	Narrator	Christopher Coghill
2009	Blue Murder	Liam Whittick	1 episode: This Charming Man	
2011	Hollyoaks Later	Johnny	Recurring: 5 episodes	Christopher Coghill
2014	Silent Witness	Linus Skinner	1 episodes	Christopher Coghill
2015	Home Fires	Stanley Farrow		Christopher Coghill
2016	Endeavour	Seth	1 episode: 4.4	Christopher Coghill
2017	Line of Duty	Kevin	1 episode: #4.4	Christopher Coghill
2017	Murdered for Being Different	Dave Maltby		
2018	Casualty	Karl Compson	1 episode: #32.32	Christopher Coghill
2022	The Walk-In	Chris Lythgoe	4 episodes	
2022-2023	Slow Horses	Hobbs	Recurring (season 1 and season 3).	Christopher Coghill
2023	The Bay	Alex Kirby	3 episodes	
2025–present	Emmerdale	Kev Townsend	Regular role	Christopher Coghill
2026	Silent Witness	Scott Ashton	Episode: "Grace of God"	
