= EastEnders Live =

2010 live episode of EastEnders

- EastEnders episode
- Stacey Branning confesses to killing Archie Mitchell
- Episode no.: Episode 3952
- Directed by: Clive Arnold
- Written by: Simon Ashdown
- Production code: DRAB183J
- Original air date: 19 February 2010
- Running time: 30 minutes

Episode chronology
← Previous; Episode 3951	Next → Episode 3953

"EastEnders Live" is a live episode of the British television soap opera EastEnders, broadcast on BBC One on 19 February 2010. It was also simulcast to Irish viewers on RTÉ One. The episode was commissioned as part of the show's 25th anniversary celebrations, and was the first EastEnders episode to be broadcast live. It was the series' 3,952nd episode, and was written by Simon Ashdown, directed by Clive Arnold and produced by Diederick Santer. The episode concludes a "Whodunit" storyline "Who Killed Archie?", about the murder of Archie Mitchell (Larry Lamb), revealing his killer to be Stacey Branning (Lacey Turner). It also sees the exit of Charlie Clements as Stacey's husband Bradley Branning, who dies after falling from the roof of The Queen Victoria public house.

Turner only learned that Stacey was Archie's killer half an hour before the episode aired, in a bid by the production team to maintain the storyline's secrecy. 51 EastEnders cast members appeared in the episode, with several expressing trepidation about performing live prior to the broadcast. Cast members had two weeks to rehearse the episode, with one rehearsal filmed in case of any serious problems during transmission. When Turner fell ill with the flu on the day of broadcast, it was feared the producers might need to use the pre-recorded tape, but in the event she recovered enough to appear.

"EastEnders Live" was Santer's final episode as EastEnders' executive producer. He expressed his pleasure with the episode, despite several errors during transmission, including mis-delivered lines and some problems with sound and camera shots. Viewers gambled on the identity of the killer, with bookmakers Ladbrokes experiencing record levels of gambling on a television series, and William Hill taking £500,000, surpassing the amount placed on the outcome of Dallas' Who shot J.R.? storyline in 1980. The episode was watched by 19.9 million cumulative viewers, becoming the most watched show of the year to date. EastEnders Live: The Aftermath, a documentary which followed the episode on BBC Three, was seen by 4.54 million viewers, drawing the station's highest ever ratings. "EastEnders Live" received mixed reviews from critics. It was described as "a triumph" by Shane Donaghey of The Belfast Telegraph, praised by Tom Sutcliffe of The Independent for including stunt work, and commended for Clements and Turner's acting by Tim Teeman of The Times. In contrast, however, The Guardian's Nancy Banks-Smith felt that viewers would be "incredulous" with the episode's outcome, and Cate Devine of The Herald criticised problems with lighting and sound effects.

== Plot ==
In the wake of their second wedding, husband Bradley Branning (Charlie Clements) and his wife Stacey Slater (Lacey Turner) prepare to flee Walford - with Bradley urged to do so by his father Max Branning (Jake Wood) and uncle Jack Branning (Scott Maslen) after becoming the prime suspect in the police investigation of the murder of local pub landlord Archie Mitchell (Larry Lamb) on Christmas Day 2009. Max distracts the police while Bradley and Stacey attempt to escape from Albert Square. Elsewhere, Archie's youngest daughter Roxy Mitchell (Rita Simons) suspects that her sister Ronnie Mitchell (Samantha Womack) is the murderer. She accuses Ronnie, who tells her that their father raped Stacey, and thereupon reveals that he did the same to her when she was a child. Ronnie and Roxy's cousin Phil (Steve McFadden) ransacks the home of his stepson Ian Beale (Adam Woodyatt), believing that Ian has in his possession a cufflink which would implicate him in Archie's murder. He exits without finding it, leaving Ian and their elderly neighbour Dot Branning (June Brown) to watch an old videotape of their family and friends from the past 25 years - reminiscing about the past.

Phil's mother Peggy (Barbara Windsor) is accused by her stepdaughter, Janine Butcher (Charlie Brooks), of attempting to frame her for the murder. As Janine prepares to flee Walford, Peggy finds Roxy and Ronnie fighting. She tells the girls that she too was present the night Archie was killed, arriving to find him injured but alive, however left without calling for medical help. Outside, Bradley and Stacey are about to take a taxi to St Pancras railway station when Bradley realises he has forgotten their passports at home. He tells Stacey to wait while he collects them, but is spotted by the police. A chase ensues, and Bradley climbs onto the roof of The Queen Victoria pub in an attempt to escape. He shouts for Stacey to run before losing his footing and falling from the roof to his death as the residents look on in horror. A distressed Stacey is comforted by Max, and confesses that she is the one who killed Archie.

== Cast and characters ==
- Nitin Ganatra as Masood Ahmed
- Adam Woodyatt as Ian Beale
- Laurie Brett as Jane Beale
- Melissa Suffield as Lucy Beale
- Thomas Law as Peter Beale
- David Proud as Adam Best
- Lorna Fitzgerald as Abi Branning
- Charlie Clements as Bradley Branning
- June Brown as Dot Branning
- Scott Maslen as Jack Branning
- Jake Wood as Max Branning
- Madeline Duggan as Lauren Branning
- Lacey Turner as Stacey Branning
- Patsy Palmer as Bianca Butcher
- Charlie Brooks as Janine Butcher
- James Forde as Liam Butcher
- Sid Owen as Ricky Butcher
- Maisie Smith as Tiffany Butcher
- Jamie Borthwick as Jay Brown
- Linda Henry as Shirley Carter
- Emer Kenny as Zsa Zsa Carter
- John Partridge as Christian Clarke
- Shona McGarty as Whitney Dean
- Pam St Clement as Pat Evans
- Ricky Norwood as Fatboy
- Tiana Benjamin as Chelsea Fox
- Jamie Treacher as DC Wayne Hughes
- Devon Anderson as Billie Jackson
- Lindsey Coulson as Carol Jackson
- Diane Parish as Denise Johnson
- Michael-Joel David Stuart as Jordan Johnson
- Don Gilet as Lucas Johnson
- Neil McDermott as Ryan Malloy
- Sophie Stanton as DCI Jill Marsden
- Preeya Kalidas as Amira Masood
- Marc Elliott as Syed Masood
- Himesh Patel as Tamwar Masood
- Nina Wadia as Zainab Masood
- Charlie G. Hawkins as Darren Miller
- Charlie Jones as Ben Mitchell
- Perry Fenwick as Billy Mitchell
- Barbara Windsor as Peggy Mitchell
- Steve McFadden as Phil Mitchell
- Samantha Womack as Ronnie Mitchell
- Rita Simons as Roxy Mitchell
- Cliff Parisi as Minty Peterson
- Derek Martin as Charlie Slater
- Gillian Wright as Jean Slater
- Sam Attwater as Leon Small
- Simone James as Becca Swanson
- Cheryl Fergison as Heather Trott

== Production ==
=== Origins ===
"Every time I think about this episode I get excited as well as a little nervous, but nonetheless we are all thrilled to be celebrating our 25 years on screen with a live episode. It's a big test for every member of the production here, and hopefully a big treat for the audience."

— Santer on "EastEnders Live"

On 15 September 2009, the BBC announced plans to broadcast the first ever live episode of EastEnders, to celebrate the show's 25th anniversary. The air date was set for 19 February 2010, with the episode to be broadcast from the BBC Elstree Centre in Borehamwood. EastEnders' executive producer Diederick Santer initially refrained from discussing the episode's plot, but commented that it would resolve a "big storyline" which would "keep the audience (as well as the cast and crew) guessing until the very last moment." EastEnders storylines saw Archie Mitchell, landlord of The Queen Victoria public house murdered on Christmas Day 2009, with many characters considered potential suspects in the crime. Santer confirmed that the killer would be revealed in the live episode, and that their identity would be kept secret until the night of broadcast, even from the cast member playing them. Another aspect of the episode is the remarriage of characters Bianca Jackson (Patsy Palmer) and Ricky Butcher (Sid Owen). Santer deemed it the "soap wedding of the year—and perhaps the soap wedding of the decade", commenting that playing the romance against the "thriller" of the "whodunnit" storyline provided a balance he hoped audiences would be "gripped by and satisfied with."

=== Cast ===
In November 2009, actor Charlie Clements, announced that he would be leaving the soap in 2010. It was rumoured that Bradley would be seen to commit suicide during the live episode, but this was refuted by an EastEnders spokesperson. Bradley made his last appearance in the live episode, urged to flee Walford by his father Max and uncle Jack (Scott Maslen) after becoming the prime suspect in the investigation into Archie's murder. Bradley's motive for murder came from the discovery that Archie raped his partner Stacey. In an interview with daytime television show This Morning, Clements stated it was possible that Bradley was responsible, but was unsure whether he "[had] it in him", though felt that it would be "quite historical to go down as the one who killed Archie Mitchell". In the event, Bradley exited the soap by falling to his death from the roof of The Queen Victoria public house during the live episode. Immediately after filming, Clements stated that he was "drained", referring to his character's death as "a big way to go out."

In total, 51 EastEnders cast members were involved in the live broadcast. Several cast members expressed trepidation at the prospect of the live episode. Before details of the episode's plot were confirmed, Turner hoped that she would not be involved in it, deeming herself "awful" at performing live, unable to even deliver speeches. Neil McDermott feared that he would lose his composure and laugh during the broadcast, while Palmer hoped that the episode would not turn into a pantomime, commenting: "I hope we're a bit more professional than that." Simons stated that she was looking forward to the challenge the episode presented, though she would be happier once she had seen the script. Clements denied any apprehension, likening the performance to acting in theatre, and Nina Wadia stated that she was "really looking forward to it", enjoying experiences with an "adrenaline rush." Once the script was released, Wadia was "disappointed yet relieved" to learn she did not have a speaking role, explaining: "You want to be in it, but not to mess it up." She expected to feel "uncomfortable" during the broadcast, as the episode is set the day before her character Zainab Masood gives birth, necessitating the wearing of a body suit with a large "baby bump" sewn in.

=== Rehearsals ===
The EastEnders cast and crew had two weeks to rehearse the episode prior to its live transmission. The script was issued on the afternoon of 5 February 2010, written by series consultant and lead show writer Simon Ashdown. The first read-through took place on 8 February 2010, though producers held back the part of the script revealing Archie's true killer. Eight different possible endings were rehearsed, with Santer reiterating that the actor playing the killer would only be told so on the night of broadcast. He revealed that the actor playing the killer would be informed of their actions at 7:30 pm on 19 February, 30 minutes before the episode's transmission, with their reaction filmed for the documentary EastEnders Live: The Aftermath, which aired on BBC Three immediately after "EastEnders Live" was broadcast, narrated by Lamb's son George.

Santer explained that the killer "may be revealed to the audience rather than the Square", preserving secrecy as the crew began filming episodes to be transmitted after the live broadcast. Actress Charlie Brooks, who plays Archie's former lover Janine Butcher, found the secrecy difficult to work with, explaining: "In the episodes to be shown afterwards, you’re being told to look or speak a certain way, but not why." Santer confirmed that the cast found the episode challenging, stating: "They are as desperate to know who did it as the viewers", though believed they were all capable of coping with the pressure of the live episode. He explained that the cast typically film scenes in one take anyway, and observed that several EastEnders actors had formerly appeared in live broadcasts for other series. Cast members had just two dress rehearsals in advance of the live episode, and only one read-through of the entire episode.

=== Directing ===
Arnold was initially sceptical when approached about directing "EastEnders Live", but agreed once it was explained that the impetus for the episode was motivated by the "whodunnit" storyline. He explained: "We pre-record TV drama for lots of very good reasons and doing a live episode can sometimes come across a little gimmicky, so for me, story is the one and only reason a drama should go live." Direction of the episode differed from typical episodes of EastEnders, whereby actors briefly run through their lines, block the scene to be filmed, then begin shooting with the director on the studio floor. For "EastEnders Live", cast and crew had two weeks to work on the episode, rehearsing, blocking scenes and discussing the characters' journeys at length.

Once technical rehearsals began and cameras were added in, Arnold moved from the studio floor to an outside broadcast truck. All cameras on set were cabled to the truck, allowing Arnold to oversee the entire episode remotely. Arnold approached the episode as though it were a theatrical performance, explaining: "We can work on performance and blocking early on, discussing issues and discovering the text as we go. Actors know to save their energy when technical rehearsals are taking place and then it's quite magical when all elements are combined close to the first performance. Of course, our theatre company will have it's [sic] opening and closing night on Friday, February 19!"

=== Filming ===
In case of any serious problems during transmission, a rehearsal for the episode was filmed, including each version of the reveal scene. Santer explained that the tape would not be used for minor problems such as cast members forgetting their lines, in which instance: "we'll power on using our improvisational skills. It's really just for technical backup in case of a proper crisis." The live broadcast took 400 camera shots to film, and 36 camera operators. Typical episodes of EastEnders utilise just four camera operators. Two outside broadcast trucks were hired to remotely direct and monitor the episode from, and three golf buggies were used to transport cast between sets, as the minimum length of time actors had to move from one set to another was just 131 seconds.

Arnold explained that filming "EastEnders Live" to look like a typical episode of EastEnders was difficult, giving the example of a scene involving a ringing mobile phone. In a usual EastEnders episode, the viewer would see a shot of the phone and know who was calling. In the live episode, the caller would have to be visually or audibly obvious, as a result of the camera set-up and inability to edit scenes. He described the episode's biggest limitation as the weather, explaining that "EastEnders Live" begins with a direct pickup from the previous episode of EastEnders, with the same characters in the same outside location, leaving the crew hoping for a dry night. Sound was also a problem, as sound quality is better using boom poles than radio microphones, but booms often dip into shot during the filming of EastEnders. Arnold commented that the production crew would be using booms where possible, but that all cast members with dialogue would be fitted with a wireless microphone pack as backup.

=== Broadcast ===
On the day of broadcast, The Mirror reported that EastEnders producers may have to re-write the episode or run a pre-recorded rehearsal tape rather than go ahead with the live transmission, as Turner was suffering from the flu and was unable to speak. In the event, Turner recovered enough to appear, though was given permission to whisper her lines if necessary. She was able to deliver her dialogue as planned, however was too ill to appear on EastEnders Live: The Aftermath following the episode. Turner commented that nothing could have stopped her from appearing in the episode, as the cast had worked so hard on it, and it was "such a big part of TV history". Several errors were made during the transmission. Barbara Windsor as Peggy incorrectly called Janine "June" and Maslen stumbled over several of his lines. During the final scene, a camera was visibly jostled, sound became muffled and some zoom shots "misfired". Following Bradley's fall, Wood was observed inserting his fingers into his throat to help him retch. The script called for Wood to be sick, though there was not enough time for him to put the liquid into his mouth, and he stated that a person would put their fingers into their throat anyway, "to get it all out". During a scene in which Roxy and Ronnie argued in the Minute Mart, Womack took a bottle of paint stripper from the shelves, but forgot to stop at the counter to pay for it before exiting.

Santer, who stood down as executive producer after the episode's transmission, succeeded by Bryan Kirkwood, commented that he was happy, relieved and proud with the broadcast. Santer stated: "I just think everyone did brilliantly tonight—the cast, the crew, everyone. It's everything I wished for and more. I'm thrilled with how it went. It was quite remarkable. Everything went to plan. I spotted a couple of little wobbles but what I was proudest of was the recovery. The technical crew, the cast—every time we maybe veered slightly off course, they pulled it back round." Santer explained that he had always intended for Stacey to be revealed as Archie's killer, and was never tempted to air a different conclusion, despite at least ten characters having strong motives. Turner was surprised to learn that Stacey was the killer, and hoped that viewers would sympathise with her character, observing: "She not only has to deal with the guilt of what she did but she also knows that she's inadvertently responsible for Bradley's death. I think that's going to hurt her more than anything."

== Reception ==
=== Pre-broadcast commentary ===
In the weeks preceding the transmission of "EastEnders Live", the episode prompted a series of retrospective articles in the British print media, examining EastEnders' development over its 25 years of broadcast. Critical commentary was mixed. The Guardian's Dan Sabbagh observed that the storylines which will culminate in "EastEnders Live"—Ricky and Bianca's remarriage and the Archie Mitchell "whodunnit"—have seen the show undergo a revival, overtaking rival soap opera Coronation Street in the ratings for the first time in over three years. Tim Teeman of The Times highlighted the Archie storyline as representative of male characters in EastEnders offering an "essential foil" to their female counterparts, who he appraised as being "key" to the show's success, using the example of Archie's relationship with his wife Peggy and daughter Ronnie. He felt that the episode deserved high viewership, deeming EastEnders "a brilliant drama".

Conversely, Alison Rowat of The Herald felt that the current storylines indicated "the best days of EE are over", commenting: "Contrast it with the ever sprightly Coronation Street, where the scenes featuring Gail "Black Widow" McIntyre and her lucky white heather husband have been perfect soap fare. What does EastEnders have? Another murder investigation in a place that has a higher homicide rate than The Wire's Baltimore. Andrew Billen of The Times refuted claims by the BBC that "EastEnders Live" was not a "gimmick" but in fact proof of the soap's "innovative vigour". Billen deemed the live episode a "reactionary move", observing that Coronation Street had aired a live episode for its 40th anniversary in 2000. He reminded readers: "live television drama is nothing new but rather harks back to the earliest days of television and, beyond them, to theatre itself." The Mirror's Jane Simon hoped for multiple errors during the transmission of "EastEnders Live", commenting: "It's time EastEnders gave us a laugh."

=== Gambling ===
"Betting is no longer just about football and horseracing, with odds offered on Big Brother, The X Factor and Britain's Got Talent, but to be betting live on a soap opera is taking it to a new level. Hat's [sic] off to the producers of EastEnders—it is a huge undertaking to do a show like that live and we hope we will be adding some spice to it as the odds change on different characters while the plot thickens."

— Keith McDonnell, Managing Director of Bodog Europe

In a world first, online gambling company Bodog offered live odds during the episode, allowing viewers to continue to bet on the identity of Archie's killer as events unfolded. Although "in-running" betting is common during sports events, it had never before been offered for a soap opera. Odds on the killer's identity changed frequently in the fortnight preceding the transmission of "EastEnders Live". On 5 February, the clear favourite was Stacey, with odds at Bodog of 2/1. By 9 February, Stacey's odds had shortened to 6/4, though the character dropped into third place by 12 February, usurped by her brother Sean Slater (Robert Kazinsky) at odds of 9/4, and Ben Mitchell (Charlie Jones) at 7/2. On 14 February, the unlikely favourite became Tracey the barmaid (Jane Slaughter), a background character whose odds shortened considerably from 40/1 to 11/4. Sean moved back into first place on 16 February, with odds of 2/1, and remained there until the eve of broadcast.

Bookmakers estimated that over £1 million would be spent gambling on the outcome of the storyline. Ladbrokes experienced its busiest ever 24 hours of gambling on a television series ahead of the episode's transmission, taking £100,000 in bets on 30 different characters, while William Hill took £500,000, surpassing the amount placed on Dallas' Who shot J.R.? storyline in 1980. Spokesman Rupert Adams commented: "The BBC were amazing keeping this quiet. We have broken even which in a market like this is amazing. We have had a roller-coaster but have enjoyed every minute."

=== Ratings ===
"EastEnders Live" was watched by a cumulative audience of 19.9 million viewers. Its original screening averaged 16.41 million viewers, attaining a 57% audience share. Three repeats on BBC Two and BBC Three in the week of broadcast lifted the televised total to 18.8 million viewers, with a further 1.1 million watching the episode on BBC iPlayer. The episode became the most watched show of the year to date. EastEnders Live: The Aftermath drew a total of 11.6 million viewers. It was watched by 4.54 million people on its initial airing, attaining a 15.9% audience share and becoming BBC Three's highest rated programme ever, as well as the most-watched multichannel programme of the day. The documentary drew a further 6.6 million viewers over four repeat broadcasts, and 0.5 million viewers via iPlayer. The original broadcast was the third highest rated television episode of 2010 in the UK, beaten by a 2010 FIFA World Cup match between England and Germany, and the final of the seventh series of The X Factor.

Santer was delighted by the viewing figures, stating: "To get this incredible response from the audience is truly remarkable—these numbers go far beyond what we ever hoped for. I am so proud of our cast and crew for their incredible performance last night. This rating is the icing on our silver anniversary cake." Jay Hunt, controller of BBC One commented: "[The] extraordinary live episode was a fitting celebration of 25 magnificent years for EastEnders. The audience were clearly gripped by one of the greatest soap whodunnits ever." Discussing the ratings for EastEnders Live: The Aftermath, controller of BBC Three Danny Cohen appraised: "It is an amazing testament to the EastEnders team and the brave and brilliant drama they provided." Yorke responded to the high consolidated ratings with the statement: "The best birthday present EastEnders could possibly have is to know that 25 years in it can still grab the biggest audience in the UK. It's a real tribute to the show's creators that a quarter of a century on, everybody's still talking about it."

=== Critical response ===
The episode won in the "Best Single Episode" category at the 2010 British Soap Awards, and was nominated in the "Best Live Event Coverage" category of the Broadcast Digital Awards 2010. It received mixed reviews from critics. Tom Sutcliffe of The Independent rated "EastEnders Live" 4 out of 5, noting that there were "a couple of moments where the seams showed", but that "half the fun in watching was seeing if you could spot them". He praised EastEnders for not "playing safe" by including stunt work, and commented that Ian Beale's line: "I wish we could go back and do it all again. Do it right this time." could potentially have been "a horrible hostage to fortune", however felt that: "in the end they more than got away with it." Tim Teeman of The Times also rated the episode 4 out of 5, calling the revelation of Stacey as Archie's killer a "genuine surprise", and commenting that "EastEnders Live": "sometimes creaked under the weight of its own ambitions – but who cares, gold stars for effort." Teeman praised Clements and Turner, feeling that they "excelled themselves despite the odd strained pause", though noted that in the aftermath of Bradley's fall, "the perils of live TV became apparent", commenting that: "The direction slackened at just the wrong moment, and you were left hoping someone would get to a bit of script to ward off any more bizarre shots of Jack and Max fighting to free themselves from a policeman's soft grip."

Mike Higgins of The Independent deemed the episode "a technical triumph", praising the "smooth, almost flawless" and "fluent" production. Shane Donaghey of The Belfast Telegraph also called the episode a "triumph", opining that it could not possibly have lived up to the hype surrounding the storyline, but that transmitting live gave EastEnders "an energy it normally lacks, with great violence, excellent direction". He summarised: "the story gripped so well you forgot to look for the cock-ups, before a genuinely shocking denouement that you never saw coming amid all of the hype." Pat Stacey of the Evening Herald felt that revealing Stacey as Archie's killer was "a slight let-down" and "a little bit predictable", calling the episode "a triumph of logistics over logic". However, Stacey wrote that aside from the "damp-squib" ending, "EastEnders Live" was "surprisingly enjoyable [...] even for a committed 'Endersphobe like [her]self." She felt that transmitting live "added a tangible layer of tension" to proceedings, lamenting: "If only EastEnders was this exciting all the time." The Guardian's Nancy Banks-Smith similarly felt that transmitting live made for "tension, not clarity", commenting that bookmakers would be "absolutely delighted" with the outcome, but that viewers would be "incredulous". Cate Devine of The Herald was similarly critical, describing the episode as "30 minutes of cheesy dramatic counterpoint", and highlighting the "ropey lighting and poor sound effects."

Bradley's death was voted the third most emotional moment in television entertainment in a 2010 poll of 3,000 British people conducted by Freeview HD.

== See also ==
- List of most-watched television broadcasts
