= Stacey Slater =

Fictional character from EastEnders

- EastEnders character
- Portrayed by: Lacey Turner
- Duration: 2004–2010, 2014–2025
- First appearance: Episode 2826; 1 November 2004
- Last appearance: Episode 7200; 2 October 2025
- Created by: Tony Jordan
- Introduced by: Louise Berridge (2004); Dominic Treadwell-Collins (2014)
- Spin-off appearances: Children in Need (2005); Last Tango in Walford (2010); TV Soundtracks EastEnders: The Six (2023)
In-universe information
- Other names: Stacey Branning; Stacey Fowler; Jenny Smith (false name)
- Occupation: Shop assistant; Market trader (clothing stall and food van); Barmaid; Hair stylist; Car salesperson; Nanny; Cleaner; Call centre worker; Market inspector; Businesswoman; Webcam model
- Family: Slater/Branning/Fowler
- Father: Brian Slater
- Mother: Jean Slater
- Brothers: Sean Slater
- Half-brothers: Kyle Slater
- Half-sisters: Siobhan Slater; Shannon Slater
- Spouse: Bradley Branning (2007–2009, 2010); Martin Fowler (2016–2020); Eve Unwin (2021–2024)
- Sons: Arthur Fowler
- Daughters: Lily Slater; Hope Fowler
- Stepdaughters: Bex Fowler
- Granddaughters: Charli Slater
- Grandfathers: Russell Hale
- Grandmothers: Violet Slater
- First cousins: Hayley Slater
- Other relatives: Charlie Slater; Lynne Hobbs; Kat Slater; Belinda Peacock; Little Mo Mitchell; Zoe Slater; Freddie Slater; Jasmine Fisher; Tommy Moon; Bert Moon; Ernie Moon; Cherry Slater

Stacey Slater (also Branning and Fowler) is a fictional character from the BBC soap opera EastEnders, portrayed by Lacey Turner. She first appeared in episode 2826, originally broadcast on 1 November 2004 before departing on 25 December 2010. Turner’s return was announced on 19 December 2013 and she temporarily reprised her role from 7 February until 24 March 2014, ahead of a permanent return on 1 September. On 12 May 2025, Turner announced her second departure from the show, which aired on 2 October 2025, while stating that she intends to return at a future date.

The character is introduced as a feisty and troublesome teenager and extension to the established Slater family. She was created by scriptwriter Tony Jordan with Turner in mind. Producers explored the character's backstory with the introduction of her mother, Jean Slater (Gillian Wright), who has bipolar disorder. They then paired Stacey with Bradley Branning (Charlie Clements) and writers developed a series of problems for their marriage, including an abortion and Stacey's scandalous affair with Bradley's father, Max Branning (Jake Wood). In 2009, the character was placed in an issue-led storyline when she was diagnosed with bipolar disorder; the show worked with various charities to develop the story. Writers also incorporated Stacey in the "Who Killed Archie?" plot and revealed her as his killer in a live episode, which was followed by a two-hander episode between Stacey and Max. Stacey became pregnant by Ryan Malloy (Neil McDermott) and gave birth to their daughter Lily Slater. This led to a feud between Stacey and Ryan's wife Janine Malloy (Charlie Brooks), and culminated in Stacey fleeing Walford on the episode broadcast on 25 December 2010, to avoid imprisonment after Janine stabbed herself and framed Stacey for attempted murder.

Following her return, Stacey embarked on an on-off relationship with Martin Fowler (James Bye). She became involved in another issue-led story exploring postpartum psychosis in 2016, following the birth of her son Arthur Fowler. She then married Martin and gave birth to their daughter Hope Fowler. Turner went on maternity leave in August 2019 and prior to her exit, Stacey became involved in a custody battle with Kush Kazemi (Davood Ghadami) and a brief feud with her cousin Kat Slater (Jessie Wallace). After attacking Phil Mitchell (Steve McFadden), Stacey flees the square and is off-screen for thirteen months, making a cameo appearance on 28 October 2019 in between before fully returning in September 2020. Turner took a second maternity leave in April 2021 and Stacey departed for six months, after being falsely imprisoned for GBH. While in prison, she marries her female in-mate Eve Unwin (Heather Peace) to secure her release from prison. She made two cameo appearances on 16 and 20 September 2021, before returning permanently on 25 October. Stacey's storylines since her return have focused on supporting Jean through another bipolar episode and discovering that her daughter Lily (Lillia Turner) is pregnant at the age of 12 amidst financial difficulties, causing Stacey to sell lingerie photos of herself for money on an OnlyFans-style website. Stacey is later stalked by Theo Hawthorne (William Ellis), who attempts to rape Stacey. On Christmas Day 2023, Stacey helps to cover up the murder of Keanu Taylor (Danny Walters) during "The Six" storyline, and later has an affair with Jack Branning (Scott Maslen).

The character has proven popular, and Turner has won 40 awards for her portrayal, the most for any actor or soap in the UK. Her accolades include four National Television Awards, six British Soap Awards and eight Inside Soap Awards.

== Creation ==
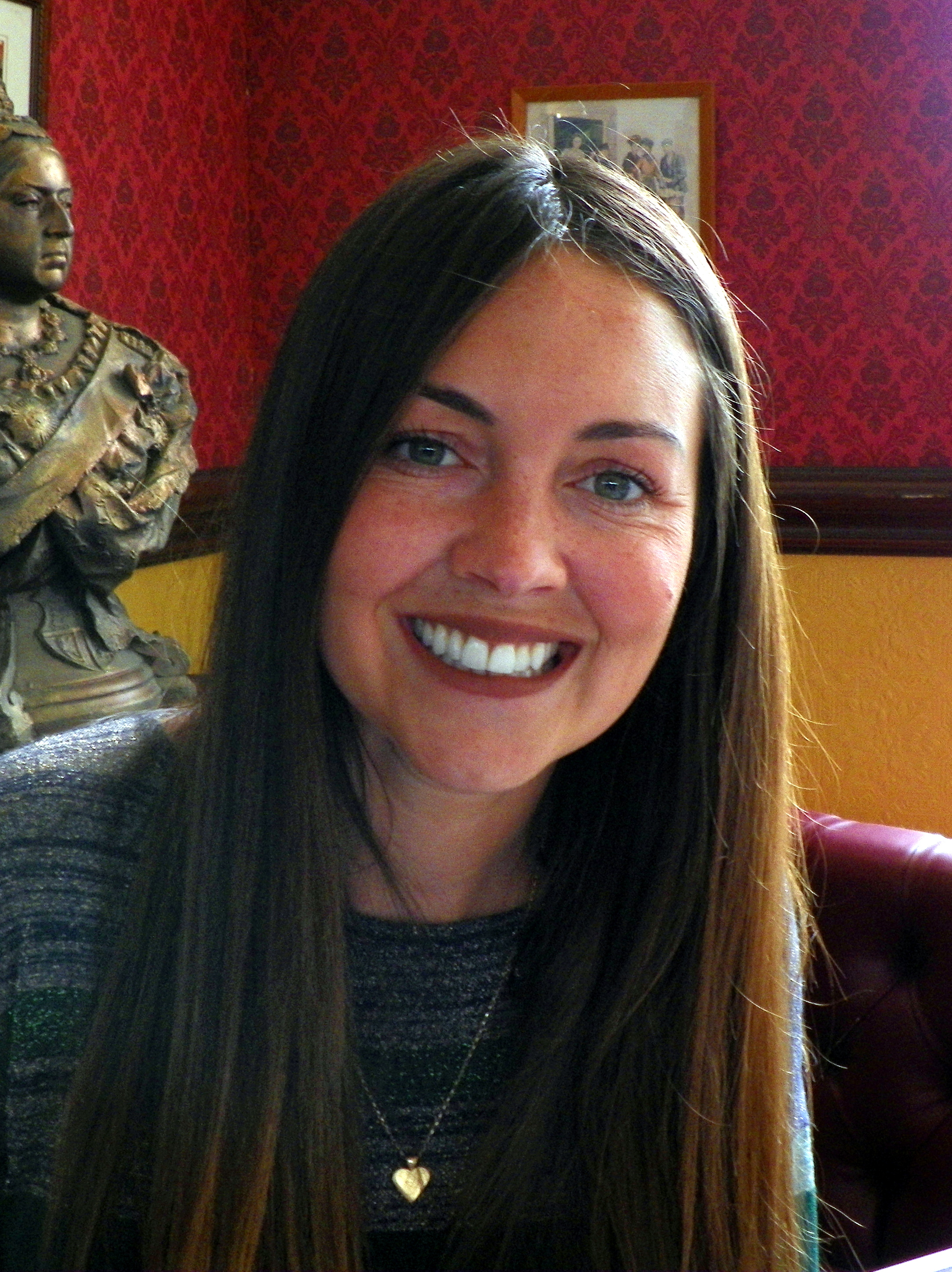
The role of Stacey was created for Lacey Turner (pictured) after she originally auditioned for the part of Demi Miller.

In September 2004, an official BBC press release announced an addition to the popular Slater family; the new "feisty female" named Stacey Slater, Charlie Slater's teenage great-niece and cousin-once-removed to Lynne, Kat, Belinda and Little Mo, and second cousin to Zoe. According to the report, Stacey "looks like a Slater and shares the same family attitude but with one difference—Stacey is one hell of a bitch! [...] She is going to be trouble!"

16-year-old actress Lacey Turner was cast in the role. Turner had originally auditioned for a part in the Miller family, but was given the part of Stacey instead. Commenting on her role, Turner said "I was speechless when I found out that I had been cast as Stacey Slater especially as I knew I would be working with Jessie Wallace who is my favourite actress. I've watched the show since I was about four years old, and I used to live in a house that backed onto the EastEnders set so I used to watch them filming all the time. I always dreamt of being on the show and so I can't believe that I've fulfilled my greatest ambition!" She added, "I'm not like Stacey at all although I love playing her! She's a real challenge [...] I think people are going to love to hate her like they did with [the character] Janine Butcher."

EastEnders scriptwriter Tony Jordan revealed that he created the character with Turner in mind: "I first met Lacey when she came to a casting workshop for the Miller family ... She was leaning against a wall and looked just like Kat Slater, played by Wallace. I thought she would be perfect for the Slater family so I wrote in Stacey's character especially for Lacey."

== Development ==
=== Personality and lineage ===
The character appears to be tough, stubborn, fiery and very "bitchy", however, as Turner explains, this is just a front and "underneath she's very vulnerable". Turner has described her character as a cross between two other EastEnders characters, Janine Butcher (Charlie Brooks) and Kat Slater (Jessie Wallace), saying: "She's very naughty, but she has her reasons for her nastiness."

Over the course of the character's narrative, it was revealed that one of the reasons for Stacey's tough and malicious exterior was her troubled family life — specifically the death of her father, disappearance of her brother, and her mother's bipolar disorder. Addressed in a storyline that aired in December 2005, Stacey returned to live with her "disturbed" mother Jean, played by Gillian Wright, during one of her breakdowns. Jean, who "sank into the dark despair of her illness", was living in squalor, off her medication, starved, suicidal, and being abused and ridiculed by her neighbours. Stacey was forced to admit her to a mental institution for her own safety. The storyline won a Mental Health Media Award in September 2006.

=== Romance with Bradley Branning and affair with Max Branning ===
In 2006, scriptwriters decided to pair Stacey with a new character, Bradley Branning, played by Charlie Clements. Explaining the characters' attraction, scriptwriter Sarah Phelps has said, "Bradley's gentleness makes Stacey a little bit gentler, and Stacey's toughness makes Bradley a little bit tougher."

The couple were shown to face problems in August 2006, when Stacey declared she was pregnant with Bradley's child, and on the advice of his father, Max (Jake Wood), Bradley convinced Stacey to have an abortion.

Scriptwriter Sarah Phelps has described Stacey's abortion as "a dagger in [her] heart ... Stacey thought that if this is what [Bradley] really wants ... 'OK I'll go through with it', but she really didn't want to. He broke her heart."

Although Stacey and Bradley split up at Christmas 2007 when her affair with Max is revealed, they reunite in December 2009 following Stacey's diagnosis with bipolar disorder (see below). Executive producer Diederick Santer commented on the storyline, saying "Bradley and Stacey are together – that's what I want, that's what the audience wants and that's what the characters want. Together, they're very strong and they can take on the world. She's good with him, she takes her medication and on the face of it, she's the Stacey Slater we've always known. As ever with Stacey, though, there's a lot hidden. There are a lot of vulnerabilities there but she and Bradley want to make a go of things."

The 2007 Christmas Day episode in which the affair was revealed is one of the most iconic episodes in EastEnders history and was watched by 14.34 million viewers, becoming the shows' biggest rating in three years and the highest watched TV programme that year altogether.

=== Bipolar disorder ===
After losing her friend Danielle Jones, Stacey began acting strangely in May 2009, and the character has to come to terms with the prospect that, like her mother, she also has bipolar disorder. The storyline was developed as of the BBC's Headroom campaign, which aims to encourage people to look after their mental wellbeing. Series Consultant Simon Ashdown had been developing the storyline for about a year. To accurately reflect the issue, EastEnders worked closely with various charities such as Mind and MDF The BiPolar Organisation, medical practitioners and bipolar sufferers when researching the storyline. The story was moulded around what Stacey would do in that situation and what the research led the team to believe was the most truthful way events would develop. Executive producer Diederick Santer said that the initial buildup of the storyline was an extension of how the character has always been, "a character of highs and lows, of great passions and dark moods," but these highs and lows would become more contrasted, and viewers would realise that Stacey's mood is more complex than just being upset over her losses, adding, "It's the beginning of us getting to really know and understand who Stacey is and what makes her behave the way she does." Turner hoped that she could do the storyline justice, saying that she believed it was great that EastEnders continued to raise awareness of the issue.

The first signs of Stacey's odd behaviour were subtle, eventually building up into more extreme acts. One of the earliest indicators was her paranoia over a poster for a fictitious video game, Deprivation, featuring two large eyes on a black background. Ashdown got the idea for this from his research notes, saying, "There were similar sorts of images described by bipolar sufferers when they were experiencing extreme paranoia."

Mind's Chief Executive, Paul Farmer, commented on the storyline, "It's fantastic that a high-profile soap like EastEnders has been prepared to tackle the challenge of exploring a mental health issue through the experience of Stacey — who is such a well-loved and popular character. The degree of research and consultancy they have undertaken to ensure an accurate and honest portrayal of how mental distress affects not only the individual but also family and friends is to be commended. ... We hope ... to dispel the myths about mental health problems and help the public to be more informed about this issue."

=== Pregnancy, Archie's murder and Bradley's death ===
On 25 December 2009, storylines showed the character of Archie Mitchell (Larry Lamb) murdered by an unseen person when the bronze bust of Queen Victoria was pushed from the bar of The Queen Victoria public house onto his head. Prior to this, Stacey had told Bradley that Archie raped her when she was suffering from bipolar disorder and she was pregnant with his child. A live episode broadcast on 19 February 2010 revealed Stacey as the killer, moments after Bradley fell to his death after becoming the prime suspect. Following this, a two-hander episode was announced for Stacey and Max, who became the only person to know Stacey was the killer. Santer promised "fascinating" stories for Stacey and Max, saying that the two-hander will explore Stacey's motives for killing Archie, and will be a test for Max as the murder led to his son's death. Santer explained that the murder was not a function of Stacey's bipolar disorder as she was lucid at the time, and she had several sound reasons to be angry with him – he took advantage of her, ruined her second chance with Bradley, caused a chain of events leading to the death of Stacey's best friend Danielle and drove her brother Sean out of Walford. The two-hander also explored the question of whether Stacey really meant to kill Archie. In an interview with magazine Soaplife, Turner said that the baby gives Stacey a reason to live following Bradley's death. However, she predicted in an interview on the official EastEnders website that Bradley's death would lead to a permanent change in Stacey's character, saying that Stacey would struggle with motherhood.

=== Departure (2010) ===
On 29 April 2010, Turner's decision to leave the show was announced after she expressed a desire to pursue other roles. She said of her departure: "I've had the most fantastic time at EastEnders. Stacey has been such a brilliant role for me to play, as has been part of the feisty Slater family. I'm so lucky to have had such challenging storylines, from the affair with Max and being diagnosed with bipolar to the complete shock of being revealed as Archie's killer during the live 25th Anniversary episode. I'll miss Stacey and everyone in Albert Square very much but the time has come to try something different." Executive producer Bryan Kirkwood added: "We'll be very sad to see Lacey Turner leave the show. Lacey is one of the best young actresses on TV at the moment and the fact that she's won 28 awards in the last five years is testament to this. It's only right that someone as talented and versatile as Lacey should pursue new challenges and we wish her the very best of luck. In the meantime, viewers can look forward to a typically dramatic Slater family exit when she leaves and the door will be left open for Stacey Slater to return to Albert Square in the future." During an interview on This Morning, Kirkwood revealed that Stacey will take centre stage at Christmas and will depart in a "dramatic plotline" and said "Christmas will be all about [Stacey]" and explained the storyline would be "a suitably dramatic and fitting departure for one of the all-time greats". Stacey departed on Christmas Day 2010.

=== Reintroduction ===
On 6 December 2013, it was announced that Turner would return to the soap to reprise her role as Stacey, and would begin filming in January 2014. Turner was quoted as saying: "I may have left EastEnders over three years ago but the show has always been in my heart, as has Stacey, and she has never really left my side. I am so excited about returning and seeing what the future holds for her. It's been a while since I set foot in Albert Square and I am looking forward to coming home." Executive producer Dominic Treadwell-Collins added: "Stacey is one of EastEnders best-loved characters, played by one of television's finest actors, and I am tremendously excited that Lacey has decided to return home to Walford. Stacey's last time on the Square was iconic. But that was just the first act. There is so much more to come for Stacey—and her return will send ripples of drama through the Square." Stacey confesses to the murder of Archie Mitchell. Lacey Turner took a break to play Molly Dawes in the new series of Our Girl. It was confirmed that Stacey will return to EastEnders once filming has finished.

=== Postpartum psychosis ===
On 7 December 2015, it was announced that Stacey would give birth at Christmas 2015 and would have postpartum psychosis, a storyline that would continue into "the beginning of 2016 as we explore Stacey's bipolar disorder and its effects on her and those closest to her." The storyline ran from December 2015 to February 2016. Executive Producer Dominic Treadwell-Collins described the storyline as an opportunity to "look at what we are doing as a country to help mothers experiencing this" and also an opportunity to allow Turner to get "her teeth into a really intense storyline." He added: 'We have always had a big commitment to Stacey's story and this time we want to explore the effects of postpartum psychosis on those with bipolar – something which, although a rare illness, is unfortunately more common when mothers with bipolar give birth – and look at what we are doing as a country to help mothers experiencing this.'

Clare Dolman, Bipolar UK's vice chair, said: 'As the national charity supporting people with bipolar, we've been glad to work closely with the BBC on Stacey's storyline. There is a very high risk that women with bipolar will become ill when they have a child and 20%–25% of them will have a postpartum psychosis so it's fantastic that EastEnders are raising awareness of this devastating condition.' The show worked with charities Bipolar UK and Mind to develop the storyline.

=== Custody battle and first maternity leave ===
On 25 February 2019, it was announced that Turner was pregnant with her first child and would be taking maternity leave, temporarily departing the soap during the year. James Bye, who portrays Stacey's husband Martin Fowler, teased that Stacey's exit would be "dramatic" and "a slightly different exit to what the audience may be expecting", while Davood Ghadami, who portrays Kush Kazemi, added that her departure would be "explosive". Producers created a custody battle storyline for Stacey, Martin and Kush as part of the character's temporary departure from the series. The story also incorporates a feud between Stacey and her cousin Kat Slater (Jessie Wallace), which Jon Sen, the show's executive producer, teased would demonstrate Turner and Wallace "at their finest". On the new story, Laura-Jayne Tyler of Inside Soap opined that Turner was unconventionally not "winding down" before her maternity leave.

When Stacey learns about Kush's plans to apply for joint custody of their son Arthur Fowler (Hunter Bell) from Kat, she goes "ballistic" and Kat realises she has made an error. A show insider explained that Stacey does not want Kush to have legal rights over Arthur and is annoyed that Kat did not inform her. Stacey's discovery leads to a confrontation between Stacey and Martin and Kush and Kat on the market. The insider told Inside Soap's Kate White that Kat is empathic towards Stacey, but when Stacey starts berating Kat, she returns the insults. They commented, "The problem with Slater fights is that they get nasty – and by the end of this, no one is speaking to anyone!" Turner explained that both Stacey and Kat are "headstrong" and "will not back down". Stacey then exiles Kat from the family, creating a "horrible and uncomfortable atmosphere" for the remaining family members. Turner stated that Stacey feels "betrayed" by Kat siding with Kush as they have been through so much together.

Writers developed the story by having Kush and Stacey involve legal services. A show insider found the story "daft" and noted that if the family could share custody of Arthur before, why has it become "such a big issue"? They added that the group "need their heads knocking together!" Turner told Tyler (Inside Soap) that Stacey is prepared to go to court to fight for Arthur because "there's [nothing] she wouldn't do for her kids". Kush struggles to pay for his legal fees, so Kat offers to help him by using the stolen money she received from her husband, Alfie Moon (Shane Richie). However, when Kat goes to collect the money, she discovers it missing and calls a family meeting to discuss it. Stacey then "blows her top" when she realises how Kat wishes to use the money. As Kat continues to search for the money, Stacey reveals that she took the money out of fear that Kat would give it to Kush.

The character is also written into another story as she becomes jealous of Max's new relationship with her friend Ruby Allen (Louisa Lytton), which Metro reporter Caroline Westbrook and Radio Times reporter Johnathon Hughes expected to play into Turner's temporary departure. Turner explained that Stacey is surprised to find Max and Ruby together and would not have paired them together, although the actress liked the pairing and thought it made "a great twist". The story also revisits Stacey's feelings for Max, despite her marriage to Martin. Turner noted that despite being secure in her future with Martin, Stacey will "always have a connection with Max", stemming from their past together. The plot was teased in a promotional trailer, released on 15 July 2019.

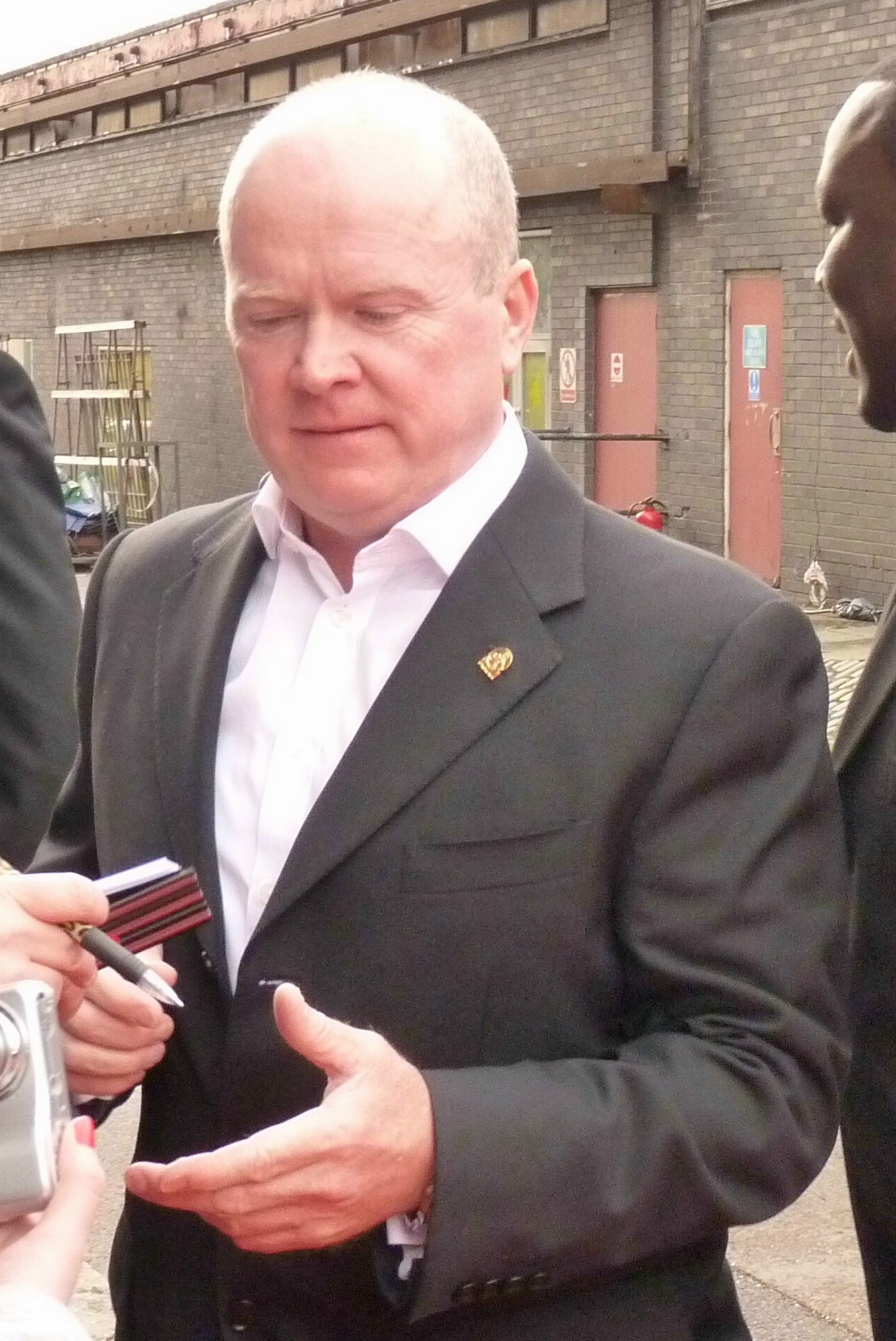
Stacey flees after attacking Phil Mitchell (Steve McFadden, pictured).

On 11 July 2019, it was reported that Phil Mitchell (Steve McFadden) would be attacked and "left for dead" in an upcoming story, with the assailant not revealed until transmission. Phil's son, Ben Mitchell (Max Bowden), and secret love rival, Keanu Taylor (Danny Walters), were set up as the main suspects for the attack. Daniel Kilkelly of Digital Spy listed Stacey as a potential assailant and thought it would be a good resolution to the character's feud with Kat and a "handy option" for writing Stacey out of the show. Producers made Stacey the attacker and the twist led to Turner's departure from the soap. In the episode, Stacey knocks Phil out with a spanner after witnessing him in a physical fight with Martin, who was protecting Kat. Turner explained that Stacey attacks Phil in a "blind panic" after spotting Martin in danger and is in "complete shock" afterwards, not processing what happens until she returns home. Ben discovers the situation and takes control, telling Stacey, Martin and Kat to leave. At home, Stacey decides to flee Walford with her children, which allows Turner to leave for maternity leave. The actress believed Stacey's decision stems from her history with the police, and added that she is "petrified" and thinks it is "her only option". Martin decides to go with Stacey, which surprises her. Turner explained that Stacey thought she was protecting Martin by leaving him, but his "true love for Stacey" is showcased as he decides to leave too. On Stacey and Martin's departure, Turner commented, "For now, Walford isn't safe for any of them so that's why they had to vanish." The character departs in episode 5965, originally broadcast on 2 August 2019.

Turner reprised the role for a single episode during her maternity leave and filmed her scenes in August 2019. Stacey returns for a cameo appearance in episode 6014, originally broadcast on 28 October 2019. In her return, Stacey meets Martin in a hotel, where he ends their marriage after Ben threatens to hurt Stacey and their children. Turner made another cameo appearance in episode 6118, originally broadcast on 26 May 2020. In the appearance, her voice was heard speaking to Kush over the phone about Arthur and Jean. On 30 June 2020, it was reported that Turner had returned to filming alongside Wallace, who had been suspended earlier in the year, marking the actress' full-time return after her maternity leave. Turner's return to filming coincided with the soap's return to filming following a break due to the COVID-19 pandemic, and Stacey returns in episode 6133, originally broadcast on 21 September 2020, two weeks after the soap's return to transmission. The narrative states that away from the show, Stacey enters a short relationship with Jerome (Chris Charles), which ends before the government-enforced lockdown. She decides to return after the lockdown, but has been in contact with Kat, who has informed her about Martin's new relationship with Ruby. The relationship features heavily in Stacey's return plot. Turner told Sophie Dainty of Digital Spy that Stacey views Martin and Ruby's relationship as "a bit of a joke" and thinks he is "there for the money". She added that Stacey is annoyed with Ruby because she is "supposed to be her best friend". The actress did not expect their friendship to recover quickly, dubbing it "bitter" with no "way out". Discussing her character's relationship with Martin, Turner explained that Stacey is still in love with him and would reconcile with him if he wished to. Despite this, the actress noted, "But in true Stacey style, she will just put on a front and pretend she doesn't care."

=== Second and third maternity breaks ===
Turner's second maternity leave was announced on 21 September 2020, prior to Stacey's return from the actress' first maternity leave. It was revealed that she would take a six-month break from the soap. Speaking to Annabel Zammit from OK! magazine, Turner pledged her devotion to staying with EastEnders and said that she hoped to remain there until she was 90-years-old. The actress received criticism from fans for leaving so soon after her first maternity leave. She was surprised by the comments, but took it as a compliment to her character. Turner gave birth to her son on 3 February 2021, a month before his due date. She had not finished filming on EastEnders and had two days left before going on maternity leave. Turner spoke with show bosses and informed them that she would be happy to film her exit scenes the following week. She praised them for accommodating to her availability.

Stacey departs in episode 6247, originally broadcast on 1 April 2021. Her exit story sees her being imprisoned for attacking Ruby, which she did not do. Despite efforts from Martin, Jean and Lily to change her mind, Ruby continues with her claim and Stacey pleads guilty in exchange for a lesser sentence. Scenes following the character's exit revealed that Stacey had been sentenced to one-year imprisonment. Turner confirmed that she would return to filming in August 2021. On 29 August 2021, senior executive producer Kate Oates teased Stacey's return revealing that it would tie in with Lytton's upcoming exit from the series. On 30 August 2021, it was announced that Heather Peace had joined the cast as Stacey's "tough-as-nails" prison cellmate Eve Unwin. Eve arrives in Walford following Stacey's release and clashes with Stacey's family and friends. Executive producer Sen looked forward to exploring Stacey and Eve's relationship, while Peace expressed her joy at working with Turner. On their connection, she commented, "We immediately got on and sparked off each other which makes going to work easy and fun."

On 4 September 2021, it was confirmed that Turner would make a cameo appearance for one episode. It was also later confirmed on 14 September 2021 that she would make a second cameo appearance. Stacey returned in episode 6343, originally broadcast on 16 September 2021 and again in episode 6345, originally broadcast on 20 September 2021, as Jean visits her in prison to tell her about Ruby's prison sentence and that she does not have cancer, as she had thought. Stacey returned full time in episode 6365, originally broadcast on 25 October 2021, as she is released from prison.

Turner took a third period of maternity leave in early 2025. While on her leave, she returned for the show's 40th anniversary live episode in which she reconciled with Martin only for him to die from crush injuries sustained after an explosion caused a beam to fall on him in The Queen Vic as well as filming the aftermath of his death. Turner was praised for returning in such a short time period.

=== Departure (2025) ===
In May 2025, whilst Turner was on her third maternity leave, it was reported that she would be departing the role as Stacey once again later in the year in order to explore other opportunities and spend time with family but that the "door would be left open" for Turner to return "when she's ready" according to an EastEnders spokesperson. It was also revealed that a "dramatic" exit storyline was being planned. In a video from her last day on set, Turner professed she would return.

== Storylines ==
=== 2004–2010 ===
Prior to her arrival, Stacey had a troubled childhood, due to her mother Jean Slater (Gillian Wright) suffering from bipolar disorder, and the death of her father, Brian, when she was 11. Stacey struggled to cope with her mother's suicidal and erratic behaviour, resulting from her illness. For a long time, Stacey was Jean's sole carer, as her older brother, Sean Slater (Robert Kazinsky), had disappeared, unable to cope with Jean's condition.

Stacey, age 15, follows her family to Walford in November 2004, to live with her great-uncle Charlie Slater (Derek Martin) and his mother-in-law Mo Harris (Laila Morse), who becomes a surrogate grandmother to Stacey, after being thrown out by her mother, Jean. She causes trouble through her promiscuous and immoral behaviour, which involves trying to seduce her cousin Lynne Hobbs' (Elaine Lordan) husband Garry Hobbs (Ricky Groves). Charlie, fed up with her behaviour, sends her back home to Jean. After Jean rejects her, she later returns to the Slaters, eventually growing close to them.

In early 2005, Stacey befriends Ruby Allen (Louisa Lytton), the daughter of local gangster Johnny Allen (Billy Murray), and they later become best friends, despite falling out a few times and disapproval from Johnny. Stacey also becomes heavily involved in the murder of Den Watts (Leslie Grantham) when she gives her cousin Zoe Slater (Michelle Ryan) a false alibi for his murder, landing an innocent Sam Mitchell (Kim Medcalf) in prison. Sam's family and Den's adoptive daughter Sharon Watts (Letitia Dean) pressure her into telling the truth, and eventually Den's wife Chrissie Watts (Tracy-Ann Oberman) is arrested for the murder. In 2006, Stacey becomes involved in her cousin Little Mo Mitchell's (Kacey Ainsworth) love life when she spots a romantic connection between Little Mo's boyfriend Oliver Cousins (Tom Ellis) and resident Dawn Swann (Kara Tointon). She informs Little Mo of this, resulting in Little Mo and Oliver abruptly splitting up.

Despite being initially unimpressed by Walford newcomer Bradley Branning (Charlie Clements), she eventually grows to like him and they start dating. Bradley becomes Stacey's first true love. Stacey is stunned when Sean appears back in her life after seven years, but is happy to have her brother back. Stacey's relationship with Bradley hits a rough patch when Stacey discovers she has been impregnated by Bradley and he urges her to have an abortion. Stacey reluctantly has the abortion and their romance sours. Bradley calls time on his relationship with Stacey when she embarrasses him at a work party. To get back at Bradley, Stacey seduces his father Max Branning (Jake Wood). Subsequently, they begin an affair. Although they agreed that it would only be about sex, Stacey falls in love with Max, but Max rejects her. Eventually, Max also falls for Stacey and agrees to leave his wife, Tanya Branning (Jo Joyner). However, Max has this on a halt as he learns that Tanya is pregnant. While Max and his family are out of town, Stacey reunites with Bradley and accepts his marriage proposal.

When Max returns, he declares his love for Stacey and wants to run away with her. Stacey tells Max they are over for good and she is marrying Bradley. Stacey feels overwhelmed on her wedding day and almost does not go through with the ceremony, but Bradley convinces her to marry him. Max propositions Stacey after the wedding ceremony and their kiss is recorded on Max's eldest daughter Lauren's (Madeline Duggan) hidden video camera. Lauren gives a DVD of the recording to Bradley as a Christmas present, revealing the fling to the entire family. Tanya and Bradley are devastated over their spouses' betrayal and both marriages end. Some time later, Bradley decides to give his marriage to Stacey another chance, suggesting that they start a family. Stacey is uncertain and secretly continues taking birth control pills. She has a one-night-stand with Callum Monks (Elliott Jordan). She immediately regrets cheating on Bradley. Stacey attempts to reignite the spark in her marriage, but eventually decides her and Bradley are over. She has a brief relationship with Callum, but they split up over his harsh treatment of her mother.

Following the death of her friend Danielle Jones (Lauren Crace), Stacey begins behaving erratically. She steals money from her family, sleeps with various men on the go and becomes a heavy drinker. She is diagnosed with bipolar disorder, but is non-compliant with her medication and becomes paranoid, experiencing hallucinations. Around this time, Stacey has a one-night-stand with Ryan Malloy (Neil McDermott) and is attacked and raped by Archie Mitchell (Larry Lamb) in the launderette. Stacey's illness convinces her that both men are planning to kill her and after attacking Archie with a broken glass, Stacey is involuntarily committed.

Stacey returns home with Becca Swanson (Simone James), a girl she befriended at the mental hospital. Upon her release, Bradley confesses his feelings for Stacey and they reconcile. Stacey then discovers she is three months pregnant, which means Bradley cannot be the father. On Christmas Day, Stacey tells Bradley that Archie raped her and he must be the father. Archie is murdered that night by an unknown assailant. Stacey and Bradley agree to pretend the baby is theirs, and remarry on 18 February 2010. A jealous Becca reveals the rape to Archie's eldest daughter Ronnie Mitchell (Samantha Womack), who tells Stacey that Archie cannot be the father as he was made infertile following cancer treatment. Becca informs the police that Bradley had a motive for killing Archie. He and Stacey attempt to flee Walford, but Bradley is caught by the police and falls to his death while trying to escape. A distraught Stacey confesses to Max that she was actually the one who killed Archie.

Stacey runs away from Walford, unable to cope with Bradley's death. Max tracks her down to an abandoned house, where Stacey explains that she was angry at Archie and was worried about what Bradley would do to him after he found out about the baby. A minute after Bradley confronted Archie, she found Archie on the floor and, lucid and angered at what he had done to her and to Danielle, pushed the bust onto his head, but ran after his fingers twitched, fearing he would call the police. She balked at telling Bradley the truth about what she did, fearing that he would take the blame for her. When she finally told him while they were packing on their wedding night, Stacey offered to confess to the police herself, but he convinced her to flee Walford with him, regardless, out of his love for her. Reasoning that Bradley only wanted Stacey to be happy, Max brings her back home.

Stacey realises Ryan is the father of her baby, but decides not to tell him. He exhibits a romantic interest in her, which is later revealed to be part of a bet with his girlfriend Janine Butcher (Charlie Brooks). Upset by this revelation, Stacey's water breaks. Ryan stays with her as she gives birth to her daughter, whom she names Lily. When Ryan later rescues them from a fire at The Queen Victoria public house, Stacey admits that he is Lily's father. Ryan initially refuses to act as a parent to her, but he eventually bonds with Lily when given the chance to look after her. Janine grows increasingly jealous and it eventually escalates to her kidnapping Lily, but Ryan gets her back. Stacey and Ryan grow closer, spending time together, and they share a kiss. During this time, Lauren (now played by Jacqueline Jossa) discovers Stacey murdered Archie and records a confession on her phone. Stacey attempts to flee to Palma, Majorca, but Ryan stops her and confesses his feelings for her. They start an affair after Stacey strips naked for him in the Queen Vic cellar, but, unbeknownst to them, Janine finds out and poisons Ryan in revenge. Ryan is hospitalised and on his return, he convinces Janine he loves her but later publicly declares his love for Stacey in The Vic. Janine concedes defeat until Lauren, who still believes Max is emotionally involved with Stacey, gives Janine the recorded confession. The next day, Janine attempts to play the recording in front of customers in The Vic, but it has been recorded over because Lauren warned Max. Janine says that Stacey killed Archie but no one believes her. Stacey leaves the pub in tears, followed by Ryan. She then breaks down and tells Ryan that Janine is telling the truth.

On Christmas Day, Stacey tells Jean she killed Archie, so a panicked Jean takes Lily away from her. Ryan convinces Stacey to leave with him as Janine will call the police. Stacey lets Janine in and she tries to set Stacey up for attempted murder by grabbing a knife, placing it in Stacey's hand and stabbing herself. Stacey runs out of the house covered in blood and Janine convinces Jean to call the police. Stacey contemplates suicide but Max stops her and says he will help her escape. Stacey convinces Jean that Janine has framed her and Ryan plans to run away with her. Stacey tells Ryan she does not want him to come with her, because she is not sure whether she really loves him. Ronnie and her younger sister Roxy Mitchell (Rita Simons) confront her over their father's murder, and Stacey confesses that she did kill Archie. Ronnie tells her to leave town, realising that she has suffered enough, and Max drives her to the airport as the police arrive on the Square. At the airport, Max tells her he loves her and offers to leave with her, but she tells him she only ever loved Bradley. She and Lily then board a flight and leave the country. The next day, Kat Moon (Jessie Wallace) receives a phone call from Stacey, saying that she and Lily are safe and well in Mexico.

=== 2014–2025 ===
Kat sees Stacey from the top deck of a bus in London. Kat finds out where she lives and visits, where she meets Lily (Aine Garvey) and Stacey's boyfriend, Luke Riley (Matt Willis). Luke believes that Stacey's name is "Jenny Smith" and is unaware of her criminal history. Stacey sees Kat leaving and returns to Albert Square to confront her. Kat later tells Luke about Stacey's identity so he ends their relationship and throws both Stacey and Lily out. Stacey and Kat visit Janine in prison to ask her to withdraw the statement she made accusing Stacey of stabbing her. Janine reluctantly agrees, so Stacey can return to Albert Square. Luke visits Stacey, but leaves, after discovering that she murdered a man. Stacey decides to clear Bradley's name and hands herself in for Archie's murder. She is arrested and later sentenced to five years in prison. After realising how much Lily is missing her, she appeals her sentence on grounds of diminished responsibility, because of her bipolar disorder; her appeal is successful. Stacey returns to Walford, moving in with Kat and Alfie and beginning work at Dean Wicks' (Matt Di Angelo) salon. Stacey and Dean start dating and she and Lily move into Dean's flat, but their relationship ends when Stacey learns that Dean raped Linda Carter (Kellie Bright).

Stacey talks to Sean over video chat, and he tells her to look after a key belonging to their late father Brian. Stacey is roughed up by Dean, who asks her about his daughter with Shabnam Masood (Rakhee Thakrar). Shabnam's boyfriend Kush Kazemi (Davood Ghadami) rescues her; they kiss and she tells him that Shabnam had a daughter she abandoned. Martin Fowler (James Bye) becomes her flatmate and they are set up by Stacey's friend Whitney Dean (Shona McGarty); they date briefly before she realises she has feelings for Kush, despite his engagement to Shabnam. Stacey and Kush kiss again but regret it. Stacey is jealous by Shabnam's pregnancy, and reconciles with Martin. Jean returns and is angry to find the key; Stacey is curious and tries to learn more, but Jean pretends to flush the key down the toilet. Stacey becomes pregnant, but Martin asks her to terminate it; however, she decides to keep the baby and Martin supports her decision.

Stacey is spooked when a man, Kyle (Riley Carter Millington), she does not know begins to follow her. When Stacey learns Martin is planning to propose, she tells him that she doesn't want to get married again; they commit to each other instead. Stacey is electrocuted by a faulty electric socket; at hospital, she learns that she is having a boy. When Shabnam finds the hidden baby scan, Stacey throws her out of the flat and tears up the scan photo. She later tells Shabnam that Martin is not the father and the real father was a one-night stand. When Kush confronts her, Stacey admits that he may be the father, which Kush's mother Carmel Kazemi (Bonnie Langford) also realises. Stacey attends a church service, where she sees Kyle, who leaves suddenly without explanation, causing her to become more suspicious. Stacey tells Martin and Jean that she has a stalker and realises that Jean knows who it is. Jean produces the key and explains that it is for Brian's safety deposit box in a bank. Stacey finds the box empty and confronts Jean, who reveals that Brian had another family with another woman, and that Kyle has been trying to contact her and Stacey through letters; Stacey realises that Kyle is her half-brother.

Stacey gives birth at Lily's nativity play and Martin names the baby Arthur Fowler, after his father. When Kush holds the baby, his behaviour makes Shabnam realise that he could be Arthur's father; she confronts Stacey, who denies Kush is the father. Kat learns that Martin is not Arthur's father and urges Stacey to tell him the truth. As Stacey prepares to, Kyle approaches and formally introduces himself as her half-brother. Stacey begins to fear for Arthur's safety and takes refuge in the church, where Dot Branning (June Brown) tells her the story of the Massacre of the Innocents, causing Stacey to believe that Arthur is in danger; she then unsuccessfully attempts to baptise Arthur. Stacey learns that Charlie has died, so flees and asks Kyle to join her; Martin calls her and claims that Kyle is lying about his identity, so Stacey accuses Kyle of being the devil. When she sees a vision of Charlie, Stacey returns to Walford. During a storm, she takes Arthur to the Queen Vic roof, believing God is coming for him. Martin finds them and Stacey explains that Arthur was sent from God and she is waiting for God to rescue them. Martin follows the story and convinces Stacey to come home. Martin convinces Stacey that a hospital would be the safest place for her and Arthur and she is sectioned after refusing to voluntarily admit herself without Arthur. Stacey is diagnosed with postpartum psychosis. Martin finds a mother and baby care unit for Stacey and Arthur in Essex. When Shabnam decides to leave Walford, Stacey admits that Kush is Arthur's father. She writes Martin a letter revealing the truth, devastating him. Although he immediately struggles, they later reunite.

On a home visit, Stacey meets Kyle again; he explains that he is transgender and Stacey invites him to stay at the flat. She also proposes to Martin and invites Kush to be part of Arthur's life, which he declines. Stacey is discharged from the mother and baby unit. Stacey invites Jean, Jean's husband Ollie Walters (Tony O'Callaghan) and her cousin Belinda Peacock (Carli Norris) for a family dinner, where Jean rejects Kyle and is told to leave. Belinda informs Stacey and Martin that they may have to move out as their pre-paid rent runs out soon. While Martin works away from home to earn money, Stacey befriends Andy Flynn (Jack Derges) and invites him to stay. Stacey receives forgiveness from Peggy before she dies. She and Martin then marry. The flat becomes overcrowded when Martin's teenage daughter, Bex Fowler (Jasmine Armfield), moves in with them, so they move into Number 31 Albert Square. After Martin is involved in a bus crash, he and Stacey decide to have a baby. When Carmel feels excluded from Arthur's life, she and Stacey fight; Carmel makes remarks about Stacey's mental health, so Stacey briefly bans her from seeing Arthur. Stacey tells Martin that she is pregnant and they agree to seek medical advice regarding her postpartum psychosis.

When Kush is diagnosed with the hereditary Brugada syndrome, Stacey becomes worried for Arthur; they learn he is at high risk of having it too but cannot be tested or operated on due to his age. Carmel is horrified to find bruises on Arthur's arms and expresses concern that Stacey is unwell. When Lily tells her that Stacey was responsible, Carmel reports her to social services, who place the children in Carmel's care pending investigation. They are cleared of any wrongdoing and a social worker tells Stacey and Martin that Lily feels pushed out by Arthur and is anxious about the new baby. Carmel admits to calling social services and as Stacey shouts at her and Kush, she suffers an eclamptic seizure and is rushed to the hospital. Stacey has to deliver the baby prematurely due to a lack of oxygen; they name their daughter Hope Fowler. Stacey supports Max after he is rejected by his family. Martin becomes worried about their history, so Stacey asks Max to leave; they then have sex. Tanya returns and realises that they had sex, so tells Stacey about Max murdering Steven Beale (Aaron Sidwell). Stacey confesses the affair to Martin and explains that they never have time for themselves. Although Martin decides to forgive Stacey, she takes the children to stay with Jean. When she returns, they argue and he throws her out, but she regains control of the house. Stacey's relative, Hayley Slater (Katie Jarvis), arrives and helps Stacey when Martin seeks a childcare arrangement. Stacey is devastated when Big Mo returns with news of Kat's death; she and Martin then have sex. A fundraiser is organised but Jean arrives and tells Stacey that Kat is not dead. It transpires that Mo is using Kat dying to raise money for a debt she owes. Kat returns and starts a cleaning business with Stacey, Jean and Mo. Stacey and Martin also reconcile.

Stacey and her former friend Ruby Allen reunite and attend Martin's school reunion. The following day, Ruby confides in Stacey that she was raped by one of Martin's friends. Stacey encourages her to report it to the police. Stacey supports Ruby through the process, and the perpetrators are eventually charged and sentenced. Jean is diagnosed with ovarian cancer and moves out. Stacey informs Sean about Jean's condition, prompting him to return to Walford. They argue, and Sean leaves suddenly. Stacey and Jean trace Sean to a barn, where he is about to commit suicide. Sean admits to killing their father, but Stacey and Jean forgive him and talk him out of taking his life. Kat begins dating Kush, and after learning of Kush's plans for joint custody of Arthur, Stacey and Kat fall out. Stacey disowns Kat as family and steals £50,000 from her, which belongs to Phil Mitchell (Steve McFadden), but she later returns the money. Kat and Martin argue with Phil over the money, and when Phil strangles Martin, Stacey hits Phil over the head with a wrench, leaving him almost dead. Stacey, Martin, Lily, and Hope then flee Walford. Martin returns alone and works for Phil's son Ben Mitchell (Max Bowden) in exchange for Stacey's safety. To protect Stacey, Martin ends their marriage and claims to have had sex with Sonia. Stacey's new boyfriend, Jerome (Chris Charles), later arrives to collect Stacey and the children's belongings. Martin then receives divorce papers from Stacey's lawyer.

A year later, Ruby discovers that Stacey has been illegally withdrawing money from her bank account after finding out about her relationship with Martin. Stacey returns to Walford, and Ruby blackmails her into staying until she repays the money. Stacey is surprised to learn that Martin lied about cheating to protect her and is upset when Martin and Ruby marry. Stacey and Ruby develop a feud, and Stacey is attacked by a man hired by Ruby but is found by Kheerat Panesar (Jaz Deol). They bond over their deceased partners and end up having sex. Kheerat offers Stacey a job as a receptionist at his business. Stacey mistakenly receives a Christmas present from Martin and kisses him, but Martin rejects her. Ruby fakes a pregnancy to save her marriage and, while arguing with Stacey, falls down the stairs and pretends to miscarry, blaming Stacey. Ruby fabricates evidence, leading Stacey to hand herself in to the police for a lesser sentence. She is subsequently sentenced to six months in prison. A few months later, Martin visits Stacey and apologises for believing Ruby, who is falsely imprisoned for drug dealing. Stacey is released from prison and reveals to Martin that she is married. When her probation officer visits, Stacey explains to Jean that she married a woman, Eve Unwin (Heather Peace), to secure her release from prison, but it is not a romantic relationship. Jean disapproves of the lie and seeks Sean's help in getting Eve to leave; however, Eve returns shortly after. Stacey and Kheerat bond, but their relationship is challenged by Eve's clashes with their landlord and Stacey's nemesis Suki Panesar (Balvinder Sopal), who is also Kheerat's mother. Stacey is hired as the market inspector but quits the job in favor of opening her own market stall, "Stacey's Baps," selling sandwiches. Stacey helps Kheerat to flee when he attacks Gray Atkins (Toby-Alexander Smith) and also learns that Gray killed Kush.

Stacey becomes concerned about Jean's erratic behavior and her relationship with Harvey Monroe (Ross Boatman). Jean begins to act nastily towards Stacey and takes Arthur to the tube station where Kush was murdered, explaining to him what happened. Jean disowns Stacey, who then tries to appeal to Harvey about Jean's manic episode. Jean becomes distant from Stacey but eventually attends a GP appointment with her, leaving midway through. She then escapes to Southend-on-Sea, where Stacey and Martin manage to stop her from drowning herself. Jean is involuntarily sectioned, but Stacey brings her home after realising that Jean is being bullied. Jean refuses to take her medication unless Lily gives it to her and convinces Lily that she has bipolar disorder too, leading Lily to take the medication as well. Stacey confronts Jean, who accidentally pushes her onto broken glass, causing Stacey to develop sepsis and collapse. Jean then decides to voluntarily admit herself to a psychiatric unit. Stacey is later devastated when Kheerat confesses to the murder of Ranveer Gulati (Anil Goutam), taking the blame for Suki and ending their relationship.

At a New Year's Eve party at number 30, Jean, Lily, and Eve suddenly collapse from carbon monoxide poisoning. At the hospital, Stacey learns that 12-year-old Lily is pregnant and names Ricky Mitchell (Frankie Day) as the father. Lily decides to keep the baby with support from Stacey and Martin. However, Ricky's father Jack Branning (Scott Maslen), tries to unsuccessfully scare Lily into having an abortion. Ryan returns after learning about the pregnancy and invites Lily to live with him in Wakefield. She agrees, worried about the financial burden on Stacey. Stacey and Ryan argue, and Lily orders him to leave when he insults Stacey; he then announces he will reduce his child maintenance payments. Stacey struggles with the cost of living crisis and rejects Kat's financial help. She borrows money from a loan shark Shifty Shiv (Peter Caulfield) but struggles to repay. He becomes aggressive and attacks Stacey, so Phil helps repay Shiv and orders him to leave Stacey alone. To make ends meet, Stacey begins selling lingerie photos of herself on SecretCam, an OnlyFans-style website. Lily's classmates find her page online and inform Lily, who exposes Stacey to the family. Stacey starts getting stalked and harassed by her SecretCam client, who is Lily's tutor, Theo Hawthorne (William Ellis). Stacey becomes increasingly paranoid and fearful as Theo continues to send her threatening messages, unwanted gifts, and breaks into her house.

Theo eventually confesses to Stacey that he is her stalker, leaving her horrified. Soon after, Lily goes into labour and Stacey manages to lock Theo out of the house, but he lets himself back in through the back door and angrily confronts her in the kitchen. Stacey then loses a court case against Theo to get a restraining order. After she tells him she never had feelings for him, he attempts to rape her, which is witnessed by her cousin Freddie Slater (Bobby Brazier), who attacks Theo and leaves him for dead. Stacey, Eve, and Freddie all panic after seeing Theo's lifeless body. Not wanting Freddie to go to prison, they plant a wrench in Theo's hands to suggest that Freddie was acting in self-defense. Theo is taken to the hospital, and Freddie is arrested but released on bail. Freddie then goes to stay with his mother Little Mo Slater (Kacey Ainsworth) in the aftermath of the incident, while Jack informs the Slaters that Theo has given a statement to the police that doesn't match theirs. On the day of Theo's sentencing, Stacey meets him and tries to trick him into pleading guilty for attacking her by promising him they will rekindle their romance once Theo serves his time. The plan works, and Theo pleads guilty.

Jack and Stacey grow closer as he supports her with their granddaughter Charli Slater. Stacey drunkenly reveals to Jack the truth about Theo's attack, and he risks his job by keeping her secret. Eve goes missing after being threatened by Ravi Gulati (Aaron Thiara), who has discovered her affair with Suki. Stacey asks Jack for help in finding Eve, and they develop feelings for each other. They end up having sex, and they decide to hide it from their families. However, Jack's wife Denise Fox (Diane Parish) sees them together. Eve later returns and reveals to Stacey that she had to fake her death to escape from Suki's husband Nish (Navin Chowdhry). Stacey hides Eve, but Jack, who is investigating her disappearance, sees her and warns her to leave Walford before he reports her to the police. After an argument with Stacey, Jack reports Eve to the police. On Christmas Day, Suki decides to leave Nish for Eve, and Stacey finds her escaping from the Panesar house. They hide in The Queen Vic, accompanied by Denise, Sharon Watts (Letitia Dean), Linda Carter, and Kathy Cotton (Gillian Taylforth). Nish soon arrives, and after Suki ends their marriage, he turns violent. Denise hits Nish over the head with a champagne bottle to protect Suki, believing she has killed him. Sharon's fiancé Keanu Taylor (Danny Walters) walks in and discovers Nish's unconscious body. After being humiliated by Sharon, Keanu strangles her, and Linda, trying to help, stabs Keanu with a meat thermometer, killing him. To cover their tracks, the women frame Keanu for Nish's attack and bury him under the floorboards of Kathy's Café. They lie to the police, claiming Keanu assaulted Nish and fled Walford. Stacey and Jack end up having sex again, and they begin an affair.

Denise's breakdown over Keanu's death leads Stacey to end her affair with Jack. However, their feelings rekindle at a family barbecue, and they kiss. They are seen by Martin who confronts them and reveals their affair to Denise's daughter Chelsea Fox (Zaraah Abrahams), who exposes it to the whole Branning family. Keanu's body is later found when the concrete cracks at the café, and when Sharon is arrested for his murder, Linda plans to confess. After learning that her ex-boyfriend and Linda's rapist, Dean Wicks, has framed Jean for tampering with his daughter Jade Masood's (Elizabeth Green) medication, Stacey suggests they frame Dean for Keanu's murder. She plants the meat thermometer in Dean's apartment, and Linda reports him to the police, leading to his arrest. During Dean's trial for Keanu's murder, Linda struggles and confesses to the police, who refuse to believe her. Linda then admits the truth to Keanu's sister Bernadette Taylor (Clair Norris), forcing Stacey and the other women to confess to concealing Keanu's body. Kathy accidentally reveals the truth to Nish, who plans to report them to the police. However, after Suki intervenes, Nish decides to take the blame for Keanu's murder and hands himself in to the police. Stacey later finds out that Martin has a son, Roman, with Ruby, and comes face to face with her once again. Martin tells Stacey he is going to apply for full custody of Roman, and Stacey agrees to support him; this plan is scuppered when Stacey accidentally reveals the truth. During this time, Stacey and Martin find themselves becoming closer; the night before Martin is due to undergo a liver transplant for Roman, he kisses Stacey. Stacey initially rejects him, but finds herself wanting a relationship with Martin again when he becomes closer with Ruby in the aftermath of the operation.

For the next few weeks, Stacey continues to deny that she still has feelings for Martin despite the pair almost sharing a kiss. However, Jean encourages Stacey to confess her feelings - she eventually does, but Martin refuses, accusing Stacey of always using him. On the same night, Reiss Colwell (Jonny Freeman) crashes his car into the barrel store, causing the pub to explode. Stacey is trapped in the rubble, while Martin helps everyone to get out. Martin decides to stay to rescue Stacey. Although Stacey and Martin successfully dig a way out, Stacey declines to leave without having a proper conversation with Martin about their relationship, in which he again refuses to get back together with her. A metal beam collapses near Stacey, prompting Martin to push her away. The beam crashes onto Martin, crushing his legs. As paramedics arrive, Stacey and Martin declare their love and plan to remarry. A paramedic then warns Stacey that Martin has crush syndrome and may suffer cardiac arrest when the beam is removed. When the beam is lifted, Martin initially appears to survive but soon loses consciousness and dies in Stacey's arms. Her anguished screams alert the crowd outside, with Ruby collapsing in tears. Stacey organises Martin's funeral along with Ruby, causing friction between them, and she leaves to stay with Sean for a while.

On the day of Martin's funeral, Stacey returns drunk and refuses to go to the funeral as she believes it is her fault Martin is dead. However, his ex–wife Sonia Fowler (Natalie Cassidy) manages to talk Stacey into attending. Lily confronts Stacey about how her abrupt departure has torn the family apart, and Stacey slaps her; Lily then runs away and doesn't attend the funeral. That evening Stacey is shocked by an arson attack on Martin's stall, and Priya Nandra-Hart (Sophie Khan Levy) claims that it was Ruby who was responsible for the fire. After Stacey clashes with Ruby, she sees a picture which reveals that Lily torched Martin's stall and convinced Priya and her daughter Avani Nandra-Hart (Aaliyah James) to say it was Ruby. Lily and Stacey remain at loggerheads as Stacey's mental health deteriorates. Lily misses school to look after her siblings, and the Slaters become concerned about Stacey. They discover that while Stacey has been locked away in her room, she has been having imaginary conversations with Martin on her phone. Lily takes Charli and decides to leave Walford to stay with Ryan as Stacey is struggling. Later, Stacey decides that she and the children need a break from Walford, and they go to stay with her cousin Lynne Slater (Elaine Lordan). She later returns, and it is revealed that she has been staying in a flat with Zoe, who appears to be struggling. Stacey tells Alfie, and despite their attempts to reconcile Zoe with Kat, Zoe refuses. She later flees to Barcelona with Stacey's credit card. Alfie goes to Barcelona to find her, but fails and returns to Walford. During this time, Stacey and Alfie keep this hidden from Kat, but Alfie is forced to tell her. After Zoe returns she is shot outside the Queen Vic, prompting Stacey to rethink her future in Walford. Sean invites her and the children to live in Brazil; however Lily turns the offer down. Stacey is subsequently encouraged by Zoe to leave, and, after finding out Zoe and Max are secretly together, she leaves Walford.

== Reception ==
Stacey has been proven very popular with fans and has been well received by critics. Kris Green from entertainment website Digital Spy responded to Shelley's 2009 article by saying "With hereditary connections and strong environmental conditions linked to the advancement of bipolar disorder, it's not surprising that Stacey, the daughter of Jean Slater (Gillian Wright) — a long-suffering manic depressive — has developed the same disorder. [...] Granted, the 21-year-old shoulders a fair whack of the programme, but this material is pushing her acting abilities to unseen levels. Lacey's one of the BBC soap's finest actresses and to be handed a story with scenes as powerful as those in last Tuesday's episode must be nothing short of a privilege. The subject matter, however, may be difficult and the portrayal of the condition quite probably more so. It's a given that Stacey's a superb specimen and one of the best female characters in soapland, but quite how the plot is doing the actress a disservice, I'll never know." According to MDF The BiPolar Organisation, calls made by young people to their helplines doubled in six months since the on-screen onset of Stacey's illness. The Bipolar Disorder Research Network also announced an increase in visitors to its website.

Between her introduction to the series in 2004 and the announcement of her departure on 29 April 2010, Turner won a total of 28 awards for her portrayal of Stacey. In 2005, she won best newcomer at the TV Quick Awards, and in 2006 she was awarded best actress at The British Soap Awards. Virgin Media named Stacey and Bradley as one of "Soaps' sexiest couples". In February 2011, the love triangle storyline between Stacey, Ryan and Janine was nominated in the "Best Love Triangle" category at the All About Soap Bubble Awards. Stacey's departure was nominated for 'Best Exit' at the 2011 British Soap Awards. Turner was voted "Most Popular Actress" at the 13th National Television Awards in 2007, and went on to receive the award for "Serial Drama Performance" three times in 2010, 2011 and 2017 respectively. Turner was nominated for "Best Actress" at the 2007 Inside Soap Awards. In August 2017, Turner was longlisted for "Best Actress" at the Inside Soap Awards. She did not progress to the viewer-voted shortlist. Turner was longlisted for "Best Actress" at the 2025 Inside Soap Awards.

Turner's portrayal of Stacey during the postpartum psychosis storyline earned her much praise from viewers with many commenting that Turner's acting was 'Oscar-worthy.' Turner's acting also won her multiple awards including "Best Actress" and "Best Female Dramatic Performance" at the 2016 British Soap Awards. At the same ceremony, Stacey's postpartum psychosis won the award for "Best Storyline". A reporter writing for the Inside Soap Yearbook 2017 (a review of the year 2016 in British soap) named Stacey's postpartum psychosis storyline as one of the "best bits of January". In 2022, Turner won the "All-Time Icon" award at the Inside Soap Awards for her portrayal of Stacey, which was voted for by the public in a category that allowed them to choose any soap actor. However, Stacey's 2017 birth and hospitalisation was criticised, with Lauren Meechan from the Daily Express explaining that fans felt that they had "missed an episode" due to Stacey being in intensive care in one episode and in "good health" the next.

Angie Quinn from MyLondon called Stacey a "Motormouth" who "keeps us all entertained with her no-nonsense attitude". In 2020, Sara Wallis and Ian Hyland from The Daily Mirror put Stacey 19th on their ranked list of the Best EastEnders characters of all time, writing that the character had "perhaps endured more misery and trauma than any other character in the soap's history", as well as noting that Turner had won "stacks" of awards for the role.
