= List of awards and nominations received by Lacey Turner =

Lacey Turner awards and nominations
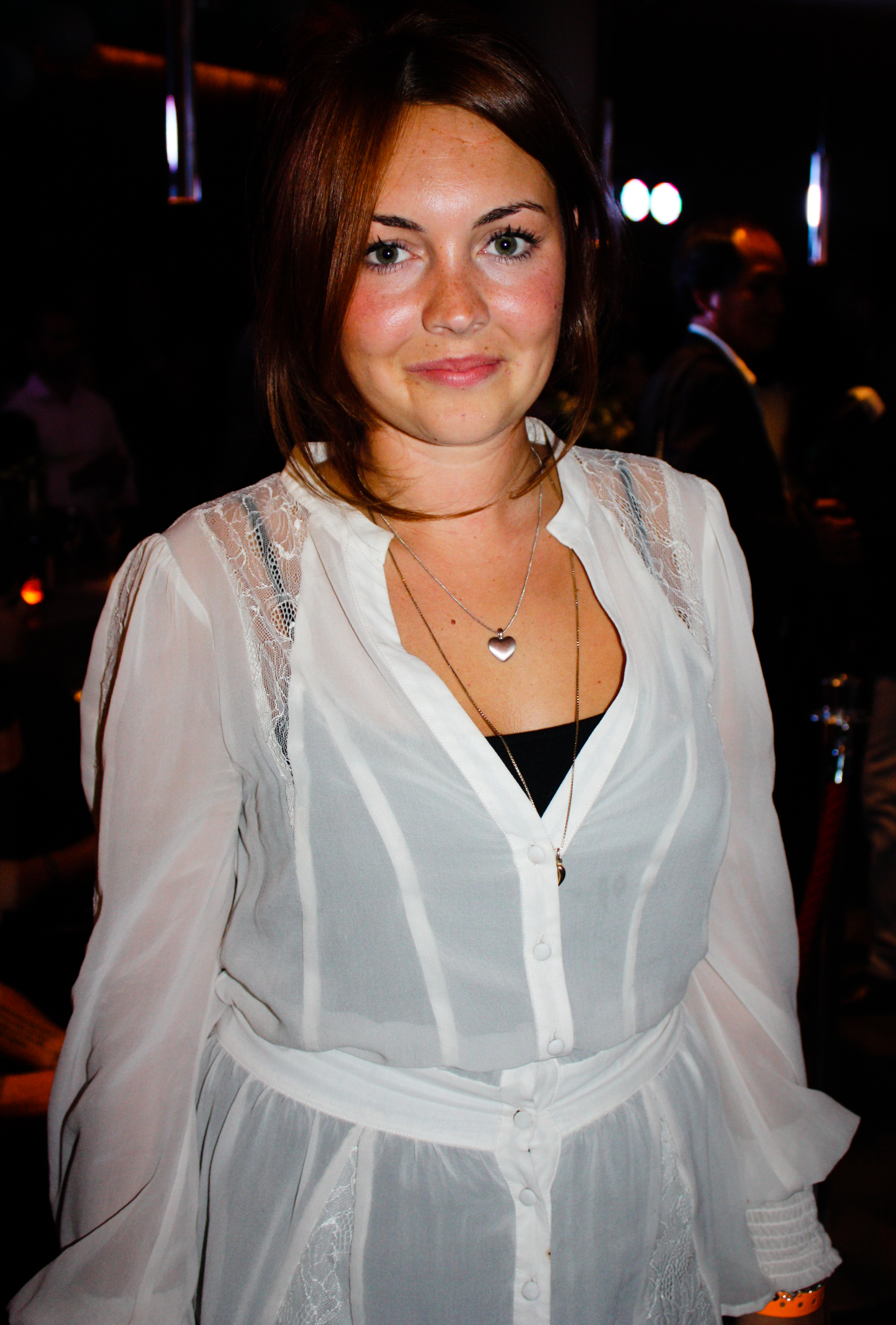
- Turner in 2010
Awards and nominations
Award	Wins	Nominations
All About Soap Bubble Awards	5	10
BBC Awards	0	2
The British Soap Awards	8	24
Digital Spy Awards	0	7
I Talk Telly Awards	1	2
Inside Soap Awards	11	27
National Television Awards	4	8
TRIC Awards	1	2
TV Choice Awards	3	7
TV Now Awards	1	4
TVTimes Awards	3	5
Other awards	3	8

Totals (Note: Certain award groups do not simply award one winner. They acknowledge several different recipients, have runners-up, and have third place. Since this is a specific recognition and is different from losing an award, runner-up mentions are considered wins in this award tally. For simplification and to avoid errors, each award in this list has been presumed to have had a prior nomination.)
- Wins: 40
- Nominations: 106

English actress Lacey Turner has won a total of forty awards for her portrayal of Stacey Slater in the BBC soap opera EastEnders, including four National Television Awards, eight British Soap Awards and eleven Inside Soap Awards.

== All About Soap Bubble Awards ==
Year	Category	Nominated for	Result	Ref.
2007	Tearjerker	EastEnders	Won	
2007	Christmas Cracker (Note: (with Jake Wood))	EastEnders	Nominated	
2007	Double Act (Note: (with Charlie Clements))	EastEnders	Nominated	
2008	Secret's Out (Note: (with Charlie Clements, Jake Wood and Jo Joyner))	EastEnders	Won	
2008	Soap Slap (Note: (with Jo Joyner))	EastEnders	Won	
2009	Celeb Style	EastEnders	Nominated	
2010	I'm a Survivor	EastEnders	Won	
2010	Killer Secret	EastEnders	Won	
2010	Celeb Style	EastEnders	Nominated	
2011	Best Love Triangle (Note: (with Neil McDermott and Charlie Brooks))	EastEnders	Nominated	

== British Broadcasting Corporation ==
=== BBC Audio Drama Awards ===
The BBC Audio Drama Awards is an awards ceremony created by BBC Radio to recognise excellence in the radio industry, in particular in audio dramas. The first awards were presented in 2012 and the ceremony has been located at BBC Radio's home Radio Theatre, Broadcasting House.

Year	Category	Nominated for	Result	Ref.
2014	Best Supporting Actress	The One About the Social Worker	Nominated	

=== BBC's "Drama Best Of" ===
BBC's "Drama Best Of" was a collection of end of year online polls at bbc.co.uk between 2002 and 2006.

Year	Category	Nominated for	Result	Ref.
2006	Best Actress	EastEnders	5th place	

== British Soap Awards ==
Year	Category	Nominated for	Result	Ref.
2005	Best Dramatic Performance	EastEnders	Nominated	
2005	Soap Bitch of the Year	EastEnders	Nominated	
2006	Best Actress	EastEnders	Won	
2006	Best Dramatic Performance	EastEnders	Nominated	
2007	Best Actress	EastEnders	Nominated	
2007	Best Dramatic Performance	EastEnders	Won	
2007	Sexiest Female	EastEnders	Nominated	
2008	Best Actress	EastEnders	Nominated	
2009	Sexiest Female	EastEnders	Nominated	
2010	Best Actress	EastEnders	Won	
2010	Best Dramatic Performance	EastEnders	Won	
2011	Best Exit	EastEnders	Longlisted	
2014	Best Actress	EastEnders	Shortlisted	
2016	Best Actress	EastEnders	Won	
2016	Best Female Dramatic Performance	EastEnders	Won	
2017	Best Actress	EastEnders	Shortlisted	
2017	Best On-Screen Partnership (Note: (with James Bye))	EastEnders	Shortlisted	
2018	Best Actress	EastEnders	Shortlisted	
2018	Best Female Dramatic Performance	EastEnders	Shortlisted	
2018	Best On-Screen Partnership	EastEnders	Shortlisted	
2022	Best On-Screen Partnership (Note: (with Gillian Wright))	EastEnders	Won	
2023	Best Family	EastEnders	Nominated	
2025	Best Leading Performer	EastEnders	Won	
2025	Best Family	EastEnders	Nominated	

== Digital Spy Awards ==
The Digital Spy Soap Awards were hosted by the entertainment website Digital Spy. The first awards were presented in 2008. In 2011, the website held the Digital Spy Readers' Awards instead.

=== Soap Awards ===
Year	Category	Nominated for	Result	Ref.
2008	Most Popular Actress	EastEnders	Nominated	
2008	Sexiest Female	EastEnders	Nominated	

=== Reader Awards ===
Year	Category	Nominated for	Result	Ref.
2016	Best Soap Actress	EastEnders	3rd place	
2017	Best Soap Actress	EastEnders	3rd place	
2017	Best Soap Relationship	EastEnders	3rd place	
2023	Best Soap Actress	EastEnders	2nd place	

=== 20th Anniversary Reader Awards ===
In 2019, entertainment site Digital Spy entered its 20th year, a special awards ceremony took place to find the most popular Film & TV choices from the previous two decades.

Year	Category	Nominated for	Result	Ref.
2019	Best soap star of the past 20 years	EastEnders	3rd place	

== I Talk Telly Awards ==
Year	Category	Nominated for	Result	Ref.
2016	Best Actress in a Soap	EastEnders	Won	
2023	Best Soap Performance	EastEnders	Nominated	

== Inside Soap Awards ==
Year	Category	Nominated for	Result	Ref.
2005	Best Newcomer	EastEnders	Nominated	
2005	Best New Talent	EastEnders	Nominated	
2006	Best Actress	EastEnders	Won	
2006	Best Couple	EastEnders	Won	
2007	Best Actress	EastEnders	Won	
2007	Best Couple	EastEnders	Won	
2007	Sexiest Female	EastEnders	Nominated	
2008	Best Actress	EastEnders	Won	
2008	Best Couple	EastEnders	Won	
2009	Best Actress	EastEnders	Won	
2010	Best Actress	EastEnders	Won	
2010	Best Dramatic Performance	EastEnders	Shortlisted	
2011	Best Exit	EastEnders	Shortlisted	
2015	Best Affair (Note: (with Davood Ghadami))	EastEnders	Shortlisted	
2016	Best Actress	EastEnders	Won	
2016	Best Partnership	EastEnders	Shortlisted	
2016	Best Showstopper	EastEnders	Shortlisted	
2017	Best Actress	EastEnders	Longlisted	
2021	Best Family	EastEnders	Longlisted	
2022	All Time Icon	EastEnders	Won	
2022	Best Actress	EastEnders	Longlisted	
2022	Best Double Act	EastEnders	Shortlisted	
2022	Best Romance (Note: (with Jaz Deol))	EastEnders	Shortlisted	
2022	Best Family	EastEnders	Shortlisted	
2024	Best Showstopper (Note: (with Balvinder Sopal, Kellie Bright, Letitia Dean, Diane Parish, and Gillian Taylforth))	EastEnders	Won	
2025	Best Actress	EastEnders	Nominated	
2025	Best Family	EastEnders	Nominated	

== National Television Awards ==
Year	Category	Nominated for	Result	Ref.
2005	Most Popular Newcomer	EastEnders	Shortlisted	
2006	Most Popular Actress	EastEnders	Shortlisted	
2007	Most Popular Actress	EastEnders	Won	
2008	Outstanding Serial Drama Performance	EastEnders	Shortlisted	
2010	Outstanding Serial Drama Performance	EastEnders	Won	
2011	Outstanding Serial Drama Performance	EastEnders	Won	
2017	Serial Drama Performance	EastEnders	Won	
2018	Serial Drama Performance	EastEnders	Shortlisted	

== TRIC Awards ==
Year	Category	Nominated for	Result	Ref.
2007	TV Soap Personality	EastEnders	Won	
2010	TV Soap Personality	EastEnders	Nominated	

== TV Choice Awards ==
Year	Category	Nominated for	Result	Ref.
2005	Best Soap Newcomer	EastEnders	Won	
2006	Best Soap Actress	EastEnders	Nominated	
2007	Best Soap Actress	EastEnders	Nominated	
2008	Best Soap Actress	EastEnders	Nominated	
2010	Best Soap Actress	EastEnders	Won	
2016	Best Soap Actress	EastEnders	Won	
2018	Best Soap Actress	EastEnders	Shortlisted	

== TV Now Awards ==
Year	Category	Nominated for	Result	Ref.
2007	Best New Talent	EastEnders	Won	
2008	Favourite Female Soap Star	EastEnders	Nominated	
2010	Favourite Female Soap Star	EastEnders	Nominated	
2010	Favourite Soap Family	EastEnders	Nominated	

== TVTimes Awards ==
Year	Category	Nominated for	Result	Ref.
2008	Favourite Soap Star	EastEnders	Won	
2009	Favourite Soap Star	EastEnders	Won	
2010	Favourite Soap Star	EastEnders	Won	
2022	Favourite Soap Star	EastEnders	Nominated	
2025	Favourite Soap Actor	EastEnders	Nominated	

== Other awards ==
Award	Year	Category	Nominated for	Result	Ref.
Cosmopolitan Ultimate Women Awards	2009	Ultimate TV Actress	Eastenders	Won	
Daily Star Soap Star Awards	2008	Best Actress	Eastenders	Nominated	
Daily Star Soap Star Awards	2018	Best Actress	Eastenders	Nominated	
Mental Health Media Awards	2009	Making a Difference	Eastenders	Won	
National Film Awards UK	2025	Best Actress in a TV Series	Eastenders	Nominated	
Radio Times Soap Awards	2024	Best Soap Moment	Eastenders	Won	
Virgin Media		Soaps' Best Couples	Eastenders	Nominated	
What's on TV	2012	Soap's Greatest Legend	Eastenders	Nominated	
