= Bradley Branning =

Fictional character from EastEnders

- EastEnders character
- Portrayed by: Charlie Clements
- Duration: 2006–2010
- First appearance: Episode 3089; 24 January 2006
- Last appearance: Episode 3953; 22 February 2010
- Created by: Simon Ashdown
- Introduced by: Kate Harwood
In-universe information
- Occupation: Banker; Estate agent; Market inspector; Property salesman; Car salesman
- Family: Branning
- Father: Max Branning
- Mother: Rachel Branning
- Stepmother: Tanya Branning
- Half-brothers: Oscar Branning
- Half-sisters: Lauren Branning; Abi Branning; Annie Carter
- Wife: Stacey Slater (2007–2009, 2010)
- Grandfathers: Jim Branning
- Grandmothers: Reenie Branning
- Uncles: Derek Branning; Jack Branning
- Aunts: Carol Jackson; Suzy Branning; April Branning
- Nephews: Louie Beale; Jimmy Beale
- Nieces: Abi Branning
- First cousins: Bianca Jackson; Robbie Jackson; Sonia Fowler; Billie Jackson; Joey Branning; Alice Branning; James Branning; Penny Branning; Amy Mitchell; Ricky Branning; Kevin; Rebecca
- Other relatives: Liam Butcher; Tiffany Butcher; Morgan Butcher; Bex Fowler; Julia Fowler; Sami Jackson

Bradley Branning is a fictional character from the BBC soap opera EastEnders, played by Charlie Clements. He made his first appearance on screen on 24 January 2006 and last appeared on 22 February 2010 after he was killed-off in the show's live 25th anniversary. Clements won multiple awards for his portrayal.

== Creation ==
In November 2005, the BBC announced the arrival of an upcoming character, Bradley Branning. Bradley was introduced as the grandson of the already established character Jim Branning (John Bardon). The character first appeared on-screen in January 2006. 18-year-old actor Charlie Clements was cast in the role. On his casting, Clements commented, "I'm very excited to be joining EastEnders and joining such a great family [...] it's wicked."

The character was allegedly conceived in the Hertfordshire town of Tring, where one of the EastEnders' storyline conferences was held. As a result, Bradley was said to have originated from Tring on-screen before his move to East London to develop a career as a banker. Bradley was portrayed as a character who had had a "sheltered life because his dad left him when he was young."

== Development ==
=== Romance with Stacey Slater ===
In 2006, scriptwriters decided to pair Bradley with the character Stacey Slater (Lacey Turner). Feeling them to be mismatched, one reporter commented, "geeky...goody-twoshoes Bradley doesn't seem like the type of lad [Stacey] would normally go for"; however, they added that the couple "may be chalk and cheese, but with [Stacey's] history of emotional turmoil, [Bradley] is probably just the stabilising influence she needs." The couple were hailed as the nearest thing Walford had to Romeo and Juliet. Explaining the characters' attraction, scriptwriter Sarah Phelps has said, "Bradley's gentleness makes Stacey a little bit gentler, and Stacey's toughness makes Bradley a little bit tougher." Discussing the union between her character and Bradley, Turner has said, "I love working with Charlie – he's such a laugh. They're such different characters. It's nice, because it's not what anyone expected for her."

The couple were shown to face problems in August 2006, when Stacey declared she was pregnant with Bradley's child and, on the advice of his father, Max (Jake Wood), Bradley convinced Stacey to have an abortion; Jane Simon of The Mirror described the episode as "incredibly powerful". Scriptwriter Sarah Phelps has described Stacey's abortion as "a dagger in [her] heart [...] Stacey thought that if this is what [Bradley] really wants [...] 'OK I'll go through with it', but she really didn't want to. He broke her heart." Bradley and Stacey were shown to grow steadily apart after this, as Bradley invested time in a new job he acquired in city bank, neglecting Stacey's needs and ignoring her depression over her lost baby. When Bradley purposefully excluded Stacey from a work function, she showed up anyway and humiliated him in front of his colleagues. In scenes shown directly after, Bradley dumped Stacey, declaring that the reason that he wanted to abort their baby was because he could not bear the idea of bringing up a child with Stacey. The end of Stacey and Bradley's relationship facilitated a plot twist that saw Stacey seducing Bradley's father Max. In episodes that aired on Christmas Day 2007, Stacey slept with Max as payback for Bradley's mistreatment. A BBC insider commented, "Stacey likes the idea that even if Bradley doesn't want her, his dad does."

In December 2009, Clements was asked if he wanted Bradley and Stacey to get back together. He replied: "Yes I do. I love working with Lacey. We have a great friendship and bounce off one another on screen."

=== Departure and death ===
On 13 November 2009, it was announced that Clements had quit the show and would depart in 2010, saying it is "time to move on and take on some new roles". Executive producer Diederick Santer promised "a big exit" for the character, saying "I know viewers will miss him hugely, just as all of us who have worked with him will miss him too." Santer commented in December 2009: "I always see departures as an opportunity. They're a shame if a much-loved actor wants to move on, but they're a chance to give characters an exciting and significant exit. Bradley's departure relates to some of the stories we're playing either side of the 25th anniversary and I can certainly promise a memorable exit for him."

Show producers denied that Bradley would kill himself after becoming a suspect for the murder of character Archie Mitchell, played by Larry Lamb, who was killed off on 25 December 2009. Bradley discovered that Archie had raped Stacey and got her pregnant so confronted Archie by punching him twice in the face. At the end of the live episode on 19 February 2010, Bradley died after falling from the roof of the Queen Victoria pub, while being pursued by a policeman.

== Storylines ==
=== Backstory ===
Bradley was conceived when his parents, Max (Jake Wood) and Rachel (Sukie Smith; Pooky Quesnel), were just 18 years old. The three of them lived happily as a family for nearly six years. However, Max could not cope with being a young husband and father and eventually began an affair with an 18-year-old girl, Tanya Cross (Jo Joyner). When Tanya became pregnant, Max left his wife and son to marry his mistress. Bradley never fully recovered from his father's abandonment.

=== 2006–2010 ===
Bradley moves to Walford from Tring to live with his grandfather Jim (John Bardon) and his step-grandmother Dot (June Brown) when he gets a job as a banker in the City. Later that year, Max moves to Albert Square, and at first Bradley wants nothing to do with him, but they eventually bond. Bradley befriends Stacey Slater (Lacey Turner) upon his arrival, and eventually a romance develops between them, despite Stacey initially being unimpressed by Bradley. Stacey discovers she is pregnant by Bradley, but he persuades her to have an abortion, and tells their friends and families that she had a miscarriage. They drift apart, and when Bradley does not invite Stacey to his employer's Christmas party, she turns up and embarrasses him, leading to their breakup.

Bradley has romances with his colleague Lydia Asler (Amy Noble) and beautician Preeti Choraria (Babita Pohoomull). Unbeknownst to Bradley, Stacey has embarked on an affair with Max in revenge. Max ends the affair by taking his family to Spain for six weeks, and while he is away, Bradley and Stacey reconcile and get engaged. They marry in November 2007, although Stacey has one last kiss with Max after the wedding, which is recorded by Max's daughter Lauren's (Madeline Duggan) hidden camcorder. Lauren makes a DVD of the recording, which is played on Christmas Day, revealing the affair. Bradley and Stacey separate, and he moves away from Walford.

Bradley returns after Stacey tracks him down, and he asks for a divorce. He grows close to Clare Bates (Gemma Bissix), but turns her down when she makes a pass at him. He is sexually harassed by his boss, Maggie Townsend (Angeline Ball), who sacks him after Dot berates her for her behaviour. In June 2008, Stacey's mother Jean (Gillian Wright) and Dot lock Bradley and Stacey in Dot's house, and Bradley reveals that he is still in love with Stacey. She says that she cannot reunite with him as she has not forgiven herself for the affair, but Bradley later kisses her and she responds, and they get back together. Their relationship runs smoothly until August 2008, when Stacey confesses to Bradley that she may be pregnant, which turns out to be untrue. They then decide to try for a baby, but Stacey is secretly taking contraceptive pills. They break up again when Bradley discovers that Stacey kissed Callum Monks (Elliott Jordan). Bradley falls into a state of depression, refusing to go to work and taking up drinking at home. He blames Max for all his problems and punches him.

Bradley becomes the owner of a St. Bernard dog named Gumbo, when his original owner abandons him and gives him to Bradley. He meets Syd Chambers (Nina Toussaint-White) and they eventually begin a relationship. She moves to the Square, but Bradley thinks he will lose her if she knows he lost his job due to the Great Recession. He eventually tells her, but does not hear from her for some time. He decides to leave Walford for Edinburgh, but is interrupted by Syd, who persuades him to stay, and introduces him to her son Noah (Micah Thomas).

Bradley is taken hostage by Nick Cotton (John Altman) in Ian Beale's (Adam Woodyatt) café with other diners. After a fire starts in the kitchen, Bradley helps the hostages to escape, and returns inside to help Nick. Nick refuses assistance and leaves by the back door, while Bradley falls foul to a gas explosion, knocking him unconscious. He has flash burns and glass in one eye, but makes a quick recovery, and is discharged the next day. In June 2009, he asks Stacey for a divorce.

Bradley is shocked when he discovers Gumbo's owner, Don, is in Walford, and wants Gumbo back. Bradley fights for Gumbo, but is devastated when the dog chooses to go with Don. Syd is offered a job in Canada, and Noah responds by running away. Bradley and Syd find him at the arcade, playing car games. Syd throws a party to celebrate her and Bradley leaving for Canada, despite Bradley not revealing this to his family yet. At the party, Stacey tells Bradley that she has bipolar disorder, to which Bradley responds by saying that he wishes he could have been there for her. He tells Syd he is not ready to leave his family and friends, and she suspects that Stacey put him off; however, he later tells Syd he wants to go to Canada. They hold a leaving party and leave on 9 October 2009, during which time Stacey is admitted to hospital, due to her mental health. When Rachel is injured in a car crash and hospitalised, Bradley, Syd and Noah return from Canada, whereupon Jean tells Bradley that Stacey would love to see him, but he says they are not staying for long.

As they prepare to return to Canada, he goes with Jean to pick up Stacey, telling Syd he is going to check on his mother. Bradley reveals that Syd has asked him to officially adopt Noah. Jean leaves Bradley and Stacey together at home where Stacey apologises for ruining Bradley's leaving party. He then tells her he cannot go back to Canada because he loves her. Stacey tells Bradley she thinks she loves him and they kiss. Stacey tells Bradley he should go back to Canada to think about it, but he goes to tell Syd it's over. Bradley tells Syd that he went to pick up Stacey and he had lied. He then says he is staying in Walford with Stacey. Syd angrily says it will not last, because she will just cheat on him again. She begs for another chance, and pleads with him not to stay with her for Noah. Bradley hugs Noah goodbye, and Syd and Noah leave; Bradley and Stacey resume their relationship. They go on a short break, and when they return, Stacey collapses, and Bradley finds work at Masala Queen. On Christmas Day, Stacey tells Bradley she is pregnant, and was raped by Archie Mitchell (Larry Lamb). Bradley confronts him, punching him twice. Later that night, Archie is murdered. Stacey asks if Bradley did it and believes him when he says he did not. They agree to say that the baby is hers and Bradley's. The police question Stacey and Bradley about the murder, and they lie about the last time they both saw Archie. Bradley then reassures Stacey that her ordeal is all over.

Jean finds out that Stacey is pregnant and works out that Bradley cannot be the father when she finds baby scan photos. Bradley worries that Jean will blurt it out but she says he can trust her not to say anything. Max overhears part of the conversation and Mo jokes that Bradley is about to confess to murder. Bradley then tells his family he cheated on Syd with Stacey. He goes for a job interview but Max is also being interviewed for the same job. They later agree to go into business together. When Bradley attends the reopening of The Queen Victoria, he feels uncomfortable, and leaves in a hurry. After Ian is arrested for murder, Bradley wonders why.

When Stacey invites her friend Becca Swanson (Simone James) from the hospital to stay, Bradley does not want her there and Becca goes back, but the next day Bradley brings her back to the Square because Stacey would not eat anything all day without her. Max starts renting the car lot for his and Bradley's new business. That night Bradley lets Becca sleep in his bed as she is paranoid about Archie's killer still being on the loose. The next morning, Bradley hides an engagement ring for Stacey.

Bradley and Stacey attend Archie's funeral, though Stacey does not want to. After the funeral, Stacey spits in the grave. Later, Becca overhears them talking about Christmas Day. Bradley leaves and Becca finds him in the Square, saying he should not be too hard on Stacey, and she has told her about what Archie did. However, Stacey tells Bradley that Becca only knows that Archie was a creep, and knows nothing about Christmas Day or the baby. Bradley proposes to Stacey; she accepts, and they have sex in the car lot. Becca lets slip that Stacey is pregnant, and everyone finds out; Bradley worries that it will ruin everything. Bradley begins acting strangely whenever someone mentions the police or the murder. Then, at Tiffany Dean's (Maisie Smith) birthday party, Tiffany tells Jack Branning (Scott Maslen), Max's brother and Bradley's uncle, that she saw Bradley washing blood off his hands on Christmas Day. Jack demands to know why he had blood on his hands, and Bradley breaks down and tells Jack and Max about punching Archie and Stacey's rape. Jack threatens to go to the police if Bradley does not, but Max stops him and convinces him not to. However, Bradley is scared when DCI Jill Marsden (Sophie Stanton) reveals that a new forensic profile has been found and DNA screening will start soon. Max says Bradley should stay with his mother until everything has blown over, but while Bradley is in the car lot, the police come in and ask him to give a DNA sample. Following this, Jack bribes DC Wayne Hughes (Jamie Treacher) to make the samples disappear. When Janine Butcher (Charlie Brooks) is arrested for Archie's murder, Stacey tells Bradley everything will be fine.

Bradley and Stacey announce they are getting married, and Becca feels left out, as only Max and Jean are invited. Becca is further upset by Bradley after the wedding, when he tells her he and Stacey are planning to live together, and that she should get a boyfriend. Becca tells Archie's daughter Ronnie Mitchell (Samantha Womack) about the rape, and Ronnie tells Stacey that Archie cannot be the father of the baby, as he was infertile, due to chemotherapy. Stacey tells Bradley that the baby is not Archie's, but she does not know whose it is, while Becca phones the police. The father is later revealed to be Ryan Malloy.

Jack receives a call from Hughes that Bradley is to be arrested, so he tells Bradley he must get out of Walford quickly. Stacey and Bradley sit down on a bed, and take some before coming downstairs. As he attempts to flee with Stacey, he realises that he has forgotten their passports, and goes to recover them from his home, telling Stacey to stay where she is until he returns. He successfully retrieves the passports without being noticed by the police; however, his phone rings as he walks back to Stacey, and DCI Marsden spots him. He attempts to flee up a fire escape, and subsequently across rooftops. When he reaches the roof of the Queen Vic, he shouts to Stacey to run, before losing his balance and falling to his death as the residents look on in horror. As Max pulls a distressed Stacey aside, Stacey admits to him that it is her fault Bradley is dead, and confesses that she is Archie's killer. Bradley is later visited in the hospital's chapel of rest by Max and the Slaters, after which an emotional Stacey goes missing, unable to cope with Bradley's death. On the day of Bradley's funeral, police close the investigation, and an inquest court finds Bradley guilty.

Five weeks after Bradley's death, Max tracks Stacey down to an abandoned house, where she confesses that she told Bradley the truth that she killed Archie when they were upstairs on the bed. She feared that Bradley would take the blame for her, and offered to confess to the police herself, but Bradley refused out of his love for her, and convinced Stacey to run away with him instead. Reasoning that Bradley would only want her to be happy, Max agrees to keep Stacey's secret, and sends her home.

Five months later, Stacey confesses to Peggy Mitchell (Barbara Windsor) that she is Archie's killer and not Bradley. When Stacey flees the country after she is exposed as Archie's killer, she tells a heartbroken Max – after he reveals that he still loves her and wants to run away with her – that Bradley is the only love of her life. In 2014, Stacey hands herself in to the police and confesses to killing Archie, finally clearing Bradley's name. She is subsequently sentenced to five years in prison, but she decides to appeal the sentence, taking her bipolar disorder into account. The appeal is successful, and Stacey is released.

Nearly eight years after Bradley's death, his half-sister Abi suffers the same fate when she falls from the Vic roof along with Lauren trying to save Max from committing suicide. Lauren survives the fall, but Abi is removed from life support after being declared brainstem dead.

== Reception ==
In 2006, Clements received a TV Quick and TV Choice award for Best Soap Newcomer for his role as Bradley. Clements was also nominated for "Best Actor" at the 2007 Inside Soap Awards.

EastEnders received criticism for their portrayal of Bradley from residents of the Hertfordshire town where the character allegedly hailed from, Tring. Some residents of Tring believed that scriptwriters of the east London-based soap had portrayed their town as "snobbish", and there were complaints to Tring's Mayor, Mike James, who claimed that a lot of people were quite offended by the new character, who plays golf and drinks soya milk. A spokesperson from the soap apologised for the offence caused: "The character of Bradley Branning was by no means set to cause offence to the residents of Tring. In fact Tring was chosen after one of our storyline conferences in Tring, as the production team thoroughly enjoyed their stay [...] Bradley is by no means a snob. He has led a sheltered life because his dad left him when he was young. His mother wanted to teach him the value of money so encouraged him to get a job, which is why he worked as a caddy at the local golf course. He has a dairy intolerance and is allergic to nuts".

Bradley's death was voted the third most emotional moment in television entertainment in a 2010 poll of 3,000 British people conducted by Freeview HD.
