= 13th National Television Awards =

British awards ceremony in 2007

- Date: 31 October 2007
- Location: Royal Albert Hall, London
- Country: United Kingdom
- Presented by: Various
- Hosted by: Trevor McDonald
- Website: http://www.nationaltvawards.com/

Television/radio coverage
- Network: ITV
- Runtime: 120 minutes

The 13th National Television Awards ceremony was held at the Royal Albert Hall on 31 October 2007 and was hosted by Sir Trevor McDonald.

== Awards ==
Category	Winner	Also nominated
Most Popular Actor; Presented by Amanda Holden	David Tennant (Doctor Who)	Antony Cotton (Coronation Street); Charlie Clements (EastEnders); James Sutton (Hollyoaks)
Most Popular Actress	Lacey Turner (EastEnders)	Sue Cleaver (Coronation Street); Kara Tointon (EastEnders); Freema Agyeman (Doctor Who)
Most Popular Drama	Doctor Who (BBC One)	The Bill (ITV); Shameless (Channel 4); Life on Mars (BBC One)
Most Popular Serial Drama; Presented by Al Murray	EastEnders (BBC One)	Coronation Street (ITV); Emmerdale (ITV); Hollyoaks (Channel 4)
Most Popular Entertainment Programme	Ant & Dec's Saturday Night Takeaway (ITV)	An Audience with Take That Live (ITV); Friday Night with Jonathan Ross (BBC One); Deal or No Deal (Channel 4); 8 Out of 10 Cats (Channel 4)
Most Popular Reality Programme; Presented by Kelly Brook and Brendan Cole	I'm a Celebrity...Get Me Out of Here! (ITV)	Shipwrecked: Battle of the Islands (Channel 4); The Apprentice (BBC Two); Big Brother (Channel 4)
Most Popular Entertainment Presenter; Presented by Sharon Osbourne	Ant & Dec	Fern Britton; Jonathan Ross; Graham Norton; Paul O'Grady
Most Popular Talent Show; Presented by Darcey Bussell and Katherine Jenkins	The X Factor (ITV)	Any Dream Will Do (BBC One); Dancing on Ice (ITV); Britain's Got Talent (ITV); Strictly Come Dancing (BBC One)
Most Popular Comedy Programme; Presented by Matt Lucas and David Walliams as Lou and Andy	The Catherine Tate Show (BBC Two)	My Family (BBC One); Ugly Betty (Channel 4/ABC); Harry Hill's TV Burp (ITV)
Most Popular Factual Programme; Presented by Kirsty Young	Top Gear (BBC Two)	This Morning (ITV); The Jeremy Kyle Show (ITV); The F Word (Channel 4)
Most Popular Newcomer; Presented by Jake Wood and Charlie Clements	Kym Ryder (Coronation Street)	Joseph Gilgun (Emmerdale); Gemma Merna (Hollyoaks); Jo Joyner (EastEnders)
Special Recognition Award; Presented by Lewis Hamilton	Jeremy Clarkson	
