= Neil McDermott =

British actor

- Born: 15 December 1980 (age 45); Southport, Merseyside, England
- Occupation: Actor
- Years active: 2002–present
- Television: EastEnders (2003, 2009–2011, 2014, 2016, 2023)
- Spouse: Michelle Edwards (m. 2007)
- Children: 3

Neil McDermott (born 15 December 1980) is a British stage and television actor, who is best known for portraying Ryan Malloy in the BBC television soap opera EastEnders.

== Career ==
McDermott appeared in the 2008 Doctor Who episode "The Next Doctor", as well as Casualty and Rosemary and Thyme, amongst others, the feature films Goal! and Blooded, and various stage productions including The Sound of Music in the West End. He trained at the Mountview Academy of Theatre Arts. He joined the cast of EastEnders in 2009. In June 2011, Digital Spy reported that McDermott was leaving EastEnders. An EastEnders spokesperson said, "We can confirm Neil is leaving EastEnders. It was a mutual decision that was made before Christmas when Neil's contract came up for renewal and we wish him all the best for the future. His exit storyline will be dramatic and fans will not be disappointed."

McDermott replaced fellow Enders actor Nigel Harman as Lord Farquaad in Shrek the Musical at the Theatre Royal, Drury Lane in London's West End on 29 February 2012. The production played its final performance 24 February 2013 with McDermott as Farquaad. McDermott briefly reprised the role of Ryan Malloy in EastEnders. in 2014, 2016 and reprised the role again for a short stint in Feb 2023.

In 2022, McDermott played Daedalus in the cast album for new musical The Minotaur.

== Personal life ==
McDermott is married to actress Michelle Edwards. They have two daughters and a son.

Neil and his wife Michelle opened Mishmak Youth Theatre in January 2010.

In September 2011 he ran the Great North Run with Charlie Brooks in aid of Marie Curie Cancer Care.

== Credits ==
=== Film and TV ===
Year	Title	Role	Notes
2003	EastEnders	Ben	7 episodes
2005	Goal!	Extra	
2005	Chopratown	Henry	
2006	Rosemary & Thyme	Ryan Stebbings	2 episodes
2006	Casualty	Ben Harold	1 episode
2008	Kiss of Death	John Doe	
2008	Doctor Who	Jed	Episode: "The Next Doctor"
2009–2011, 2014, 2016, 2023	EastEnders	Ryan Malloy	Regular role; 247 episodes
2009–2011	The Royal	Dr. Ralph Ellis	Regular role
2013	Doctors	Dr. Bradley Dash	2 episodes
2014	Casualty	Gavin Nicholson	1 episode
2014	Inspector George Gently	Gary Manners	1 episode

=== Theatre credits ===
Year	Title	Role	Theatre	Location	Notes
2004	Henry IV	Ordulf	Donmar Warehouse	Off-West End	
2005–2006	Aladdin	Aladdin	Old Vic	London	
2006	Bad Girls: The Musical	Justin Mattison	West Yorkshire Playhouse	Leeds	Original World Premiere Cast
2006–2007	The Sound of Music	Rolf Gruber	London Palladium	West End	
2007	Follies	Young Buddy	London Palladium	West End	
2007–2008	La Cage aux Folles	Jean-Michel	Menier Chocolate Factory	Off-West End	UK Revival Cast
2009–2011	Les Misérables	Ensemble / Cover Enjolras & Grantaire	Queen's Theatre	West End	
2011	Parade	Young Soldier / Frankie Epps	Donmar Warehouse	Off-West End	
2012–2013	Shrek the Musical	Lord Farquaad	Theatre Royal, Drury Lane	West End	
2017	The Wind in the Willows	Chief Weasel	London Palladium	West End	
2017–2018	The Sound of Music	Captain Georg von Trapp	—N/a	UK National Tour	
2018–2019	Eugenius!	Evil Lord Hector	The Other Palace	Off-West End	Original UK Cast
2020–2022	Pretty Woman	Philip Stuckley	Piccadilly Theatre; Savoy Theatre	West End	Original West End Cast
2024–	Matilda	Mr. Wormwood	Cambridge Theatre	West End	

== Awards and nominations ==
Year	Award	Category	Result	Ref.
2010	15th National Television Awards	Newcomer	Nominated	
2010	Inside Soap Awards	Sexiest Male	Nominated	
2011	All About Soap Bubble Awards	Best Love Triangle (shared with Charlie Brooks and Lacey Turner)	Nominated	
