= Lacey Turner =

English actress (born 1988)

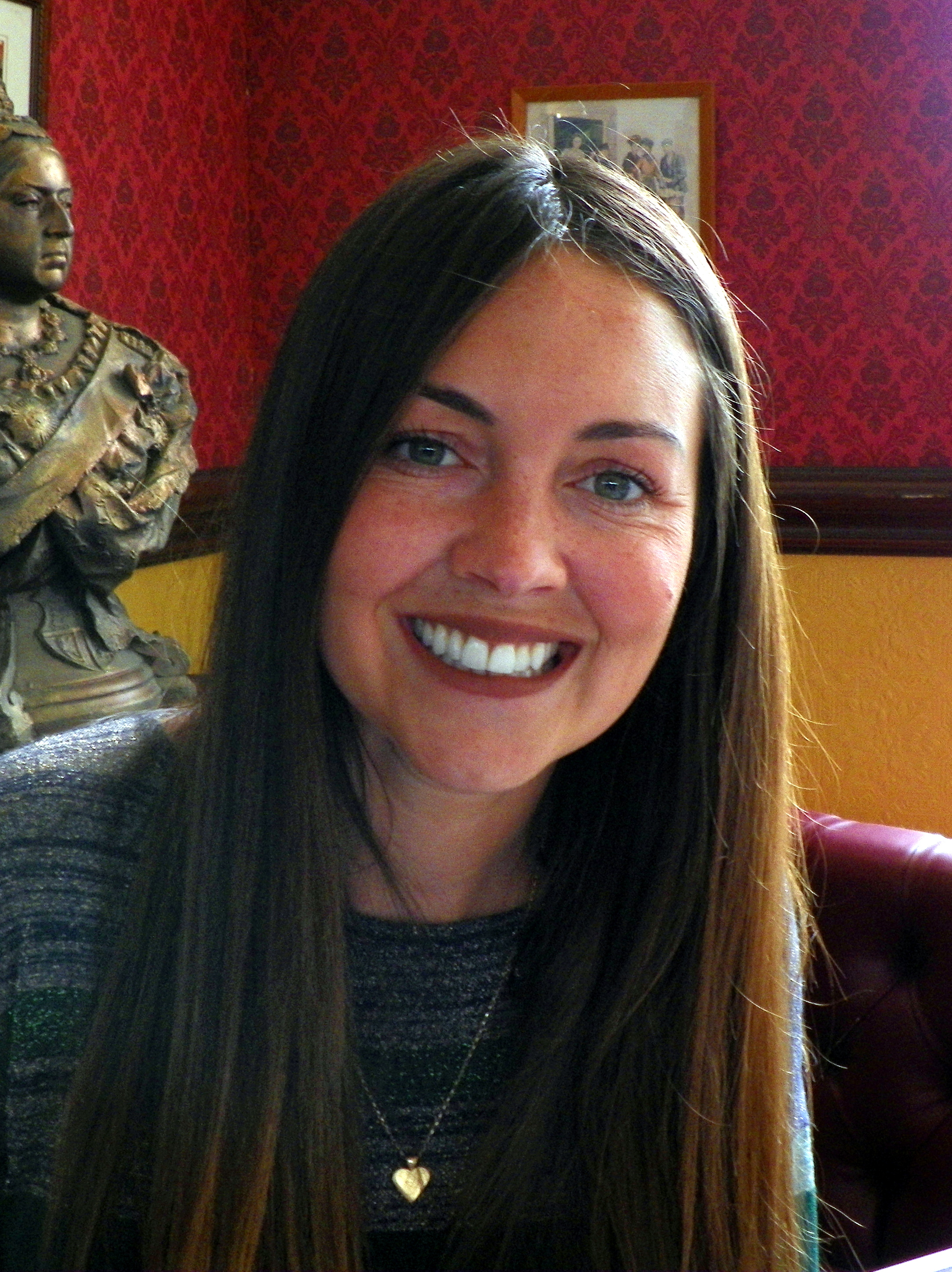
- Turner in 2016
- Born: Lacey Amelia Turner; 28 March 1988 (age 38); Barnet, North London, England
- Occupation: Actress
- Years active: 2004–present
- Spouse: Matt Kay (m. 2017)
- Children: 3
- Awards: Full list

Lacey Amelia Turner (born 28 March 1988) is an English actress. She rose to prominence and is best known for her portrayal of Stacey Slater in the BBC soap opera EastEnders, a role she initially played between 2004 and 2010, before returning in 2014 and departing again in 2025. Regarded as one of Britain's best soap opera actors, she has won over forty awards, more than any other soap actor, for her portrayal of the character, including four National Television Awards, eight British Soap Awards and eleven Inside Soap Awards.

During her break from the soap, Turner went on to appear in Being Human (2011), True Love (2012), Bedlam (2012), Switch (2012) and Call the Midwife (2014). Between 2013 and 2014, she starred in a leading role as Molly Dawes in the BBC military drama Our Girl. In 2026, she is appearing as a contestant on the twenty-fourth series of Strictly Come Dancing, as well as releasing a memoir, Gold Dust.

== Early life ==
Turner was born on 28 March 1988 in Edgware, in the London Borough of Barnet, to Catholic parents Les Turner and Beverly Harvey. She was raised along with her two younger sisters Daisy and Lily in Hertfordshire, near the BBC television studios in Elstree. She had commented: "From my bedroom window you could see part of the square [the external filming lot for EastEnders], and you could hear them all filming at night. I used to say to my mum: "I wanna be on that!" It was whilst living there that Turner decided to become an actress.

At the age of 10, Turner trained at the Sylvia Young Theatre School, but left after a year stating that it "wasn't [her] cup of tea". She later revealed she was bullied whilst at school for being "too geeky". Instead, she attended a local girls' private school, Peterborough and Saint Margaret's School in Bushey and continued to attend acting classes outside of school. Turner's earliest work included appearances on stage and in advertisements, notably a Haribo advert.

== Career ==
=== EastEnders ===
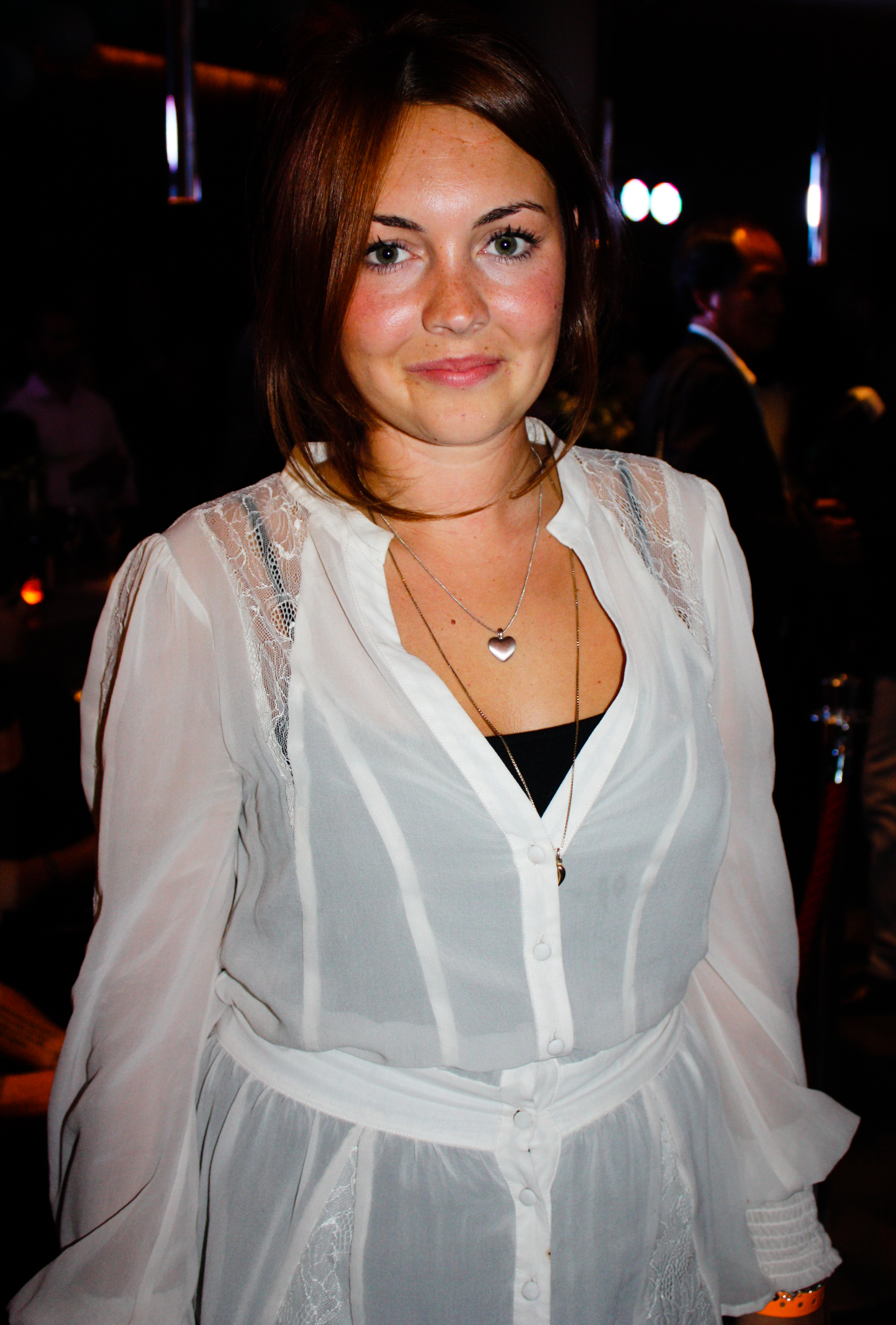
Turner in September 2010

In 2004, Turner auditioned for the role of Demi Miller on the BBC soap opera EastEnders. Though she failed to get that part, she was instead given the role of Stacey Slater, a new addition to the Slater family. She began working on the soap the day after leaving school and made her first appearance on-screen in November 2004. Commenting on the role, Turner said: "I always dreamt of being on the show and so I can't believe that I've fulfilled my greatest ambition!" Since joining the show, her character has featured in numerous high-profile storylines, including abortion, drug abuse, a troubled relationship with her mother, discovering she has bipolar disorder, an affair with her father-in-law and the murder of her rapist Archie Mitchell (Larry Lamb).

Turner starred in a live episode of EastEnders on 19 February 2010 to celebrate the 25th anniversary of the soap opera. The live episode gained over 16.6 million viewers which saw Stacey's husband die after falling from a rooftop during a police chase before Stacey's confession that she murdered Archie Mitchell. After her co-star Charlie Clements who played her husband left in February 2010, EastEnders bosses declared that they are keen to retain Turner after proving her popularity with viewers, however, she announced her decision to leave the show in April 2010. She stated: "I'll miss Stacey and everyone in Albert Square very much but the time has come to try something different." Turner later revealed that she had agreed with Charlie Clements to leave EastEnders at the same time as him. Of the decision, Turner said: "Charlie and I always said we'd go at the same time. For quite a while I'd been saying I was going to go and kept realising I wasn't ready. But when Charlie said he was going last year I was like, 'Right, OK, I'm going too'." She departed on-screen on 25 December 2010.

On 6 December 2013, it was announced that Turner would be returning to EastEnders, to reprise her role as Stacey. Turner began filming in January 2014. She made her on-screen return on 7 February 2014 and departed on 25 March 2014. She returned full-time in August 2014. Since returning to the show she has featured in a highly acclaimed postpartum psychosis storyline. Turner took maternity leave from the soap in August 2019 and April 2021 respectively. During her third maternity leave in February 2025, Turner returned a month after giving birth to star in a live episode celebrating the 40th anniversary of the soap opera.

In May 2025, whilst Turner was on her third maternity leave, it was reported that she would be departing the role as Stacey once again later in the year in order to explore other opportunities and spend time with family but that the "door would be left open" for Turner to return "when she's ready" according to an EastEnders spokesperson. It was also revealed that a "dramatic" exit storyline was being planned.

Turner's character has proven popular with fans and critics, whilst she is considered one of Britain's best soap opera actors, having won over forty awards for her portrayal.

=== Further roles and Our Girl ===
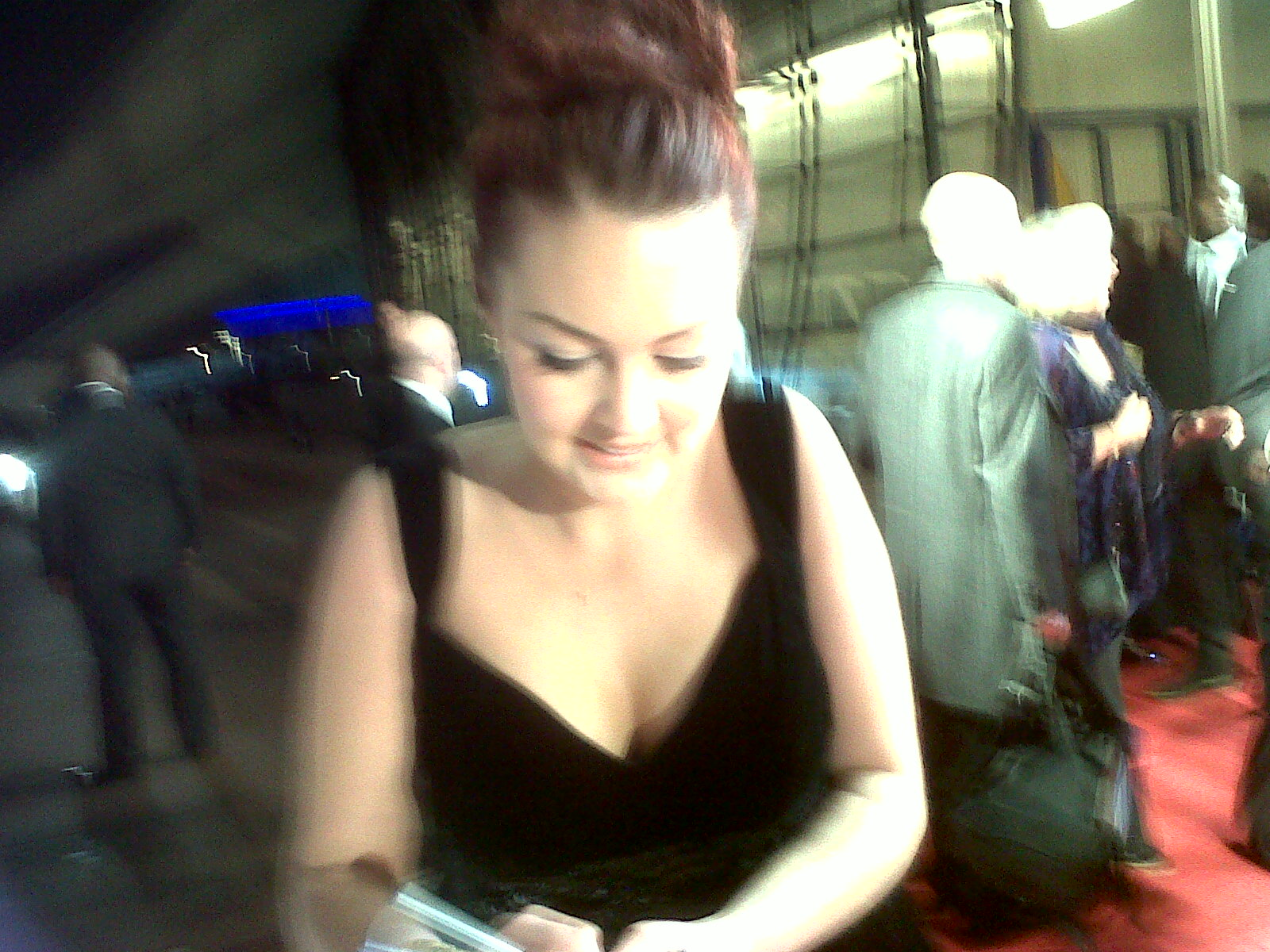
Turner signing autographs at the 16th National Television Awards in January 2011

Turner was cast as Lia Shaman in the third series of Being Human. She appeared in its first episode broadcast on 23 January 2011, watched by 1.37 million viewers (5%). She reprised her role for the series finalé. In March 2011, she played Elizabeth Lavenza, the bride of Victor Frankenstein (played by Andrew Gower), in an adaptation of Mary Shelley's 1818 novel Frankenstein; or, The Modern Prometheus titled Frankenstein's Wedding, which aired on BBC Three, live from the derelict Kirkstall Abbey in Leeds, in front of an audience of 12,000. The show was nominated for a national RTS award, but did win a RTS Yorkshire award.

Turner appeared alongside David Tennant, Billie Piper, David Morrissey, Jane Horrocks, Ashley Walters and Vicky McClure in the BBC One improvisational programme, True Love, which aired in June 2012. Also in June, she played the leading role of Ellie, a character who claims to see ghosts and spirits, in the second series of Bedlam. In October, she starred in the ITV2 supernatural drama series, Switch, which centres on the story of four young witches living in contemporary London. Turner's character is referred to as the "immaculately dressed" careerist Stella.

Turner later played Molly Dawes in a one-off 90-minute drama titled Our Girl. She began filming in BBC Elstree Studios in October 2012 and the film aired on BBC One on 24 March 2013. This was then followed by a five-part television series which began airing on BBC One on 21 September 2014. Michelle Keegan took over from the second series in a new role following Turner's decision to return to EastEnders.

=== Other work ===
In December 2010, Turner advertised Royal Mail's campaign to remind people of Christmas postal deadlines.

In October 2012, Turner joined Asda's Tickled Pink campaign. She has also done voice over work in the CITV programme, Goodbye Year Six and narrated BBC Three's Don't Just Stand There, I'm Having Your Baby. Turner also starred in radio dramas, The One about the Social Worker and Up the Junction, which aired on BBC Radio 4 in September 2013.

She later appeared in the Channel 5 documentary Miscarriage: Our Story in October 2020, where she spoke of suffering a miscarriage while at work.

In August 2024, it was announced that Turner would begin hosting a podcast, titled We Started Here, celebrating celebrities whose careers began on soap operas. The podcast aired between January and March 2025, and has featured guests including her EastEnders co-stars Jessie Wallace and Anita Dobson.

In June 2026, Turner was announced as the first contestant to be taking part in the twenty-fourth series of Strictly Come Dancing that September. After turning down the programme several times, Turner said she had finally "plucked up the courage" to sign up and that she was "excited and terrified at the same time" about competing, as well as "looking forward to meeting everyone and learning a new skill". She was partnered with Vito Coppola. Later that month, she announced her debut memoir, Gold Dust, which was released on 22 October.

== Personal life ==
Turner married Matt Kay in a private ceremony in Ibiza on 5 September 2017. On 25 February 2019, Turner announced that she was expecting a child with Kay, having previously suffered two miscarriages. On 12 July 2019, Turner gave birth to a daughter. On 21 September 2020, the couple announced that Turner was pregnant with their second child. On 3 February 2021, Turner gave birth to a son. On 30 September 2024, Turner announced that she was pregnant with her third child, later announcing she had given birth to a daughter on 17 January 2025.

In April 2021, she called for better support for parents who have suffered a miscarriage. Turner appeared on BBC Breakfast and said that the system "needs reforming".

Turner is friends with EastEnders co-stars Jessie Wallace and Natalie Cassidy, who play Kat Slater and Sonia Fowler on the soap respectively. She is also a close friend of James Bye who played Martin Fowler, her onscreen husband.

== Filmography ==
Year	Title	Role	Notes	Ref.
2004–2010, 2014–2025	EastEnders	Stacey Slater	Regular role; 1926 episodes	
2005	Children in Need	Stacey Slater	Episode: "Peggy vs Lauren"	
2010	Last Tango in Walford	Stacey Slater	EastEnders spin-off	
2011	Being Human	Lia Shaman	2 episodes	
2011	Frankenstein's Wedding	Elizabeth Lavenza	Television film	
2012	True Love	Michelle Booth	2 episodes	
2012	Bedlam	Ellie Flint	Main role; 6 episodes	
2012	Switch	Stella Munroe	Main role; 6 episodes	
2013–2014	Our Girl	Molly Dawes	Main Role; Pilot & Series 1	
2014	Call the Midwife	Stella Crangle	Series 3: Episode 3	
2020	EastEnders: Secrets from the Square	Herself	Episode: "Kat and Stacey"	
2020	Miscarriage: Our Story	Herself	Documentary	
2021	BBC Breakfast	Herself	Interview about miscarriages	
2023	EastEnders: The Six	Herself	2 episodes	
2026	Strictly Come Dancing	Herself	Contestant; series 24	

Radio
Year	Title	Role	Station	Ref.
2013	Up the Junction	Rube	BBC Radio 4	
2013	The One About the Social Worker	Tamsin Geraghty	BBC Radio 4	
2023	Gaslight	Tippi Griffiths	BBC Radio 4	

== Podcasts ==
- We Started Here (2025)

== Bibliography ==
- Gold Dust. Viking Books. 22 October 2026. ISBN 978-0-241-80985-3.
