= Charlie Clements =

English actor (born 1987)

- Born: 5 June 1987 (age 39); Sidcup, London, England
- Occupation: Actor
- Years active: 2004–present
- Known for: EastEnders (2006–2010)

Charlie Clements (born 5 June 1987) is an English actor known for the role of Bradley Branning in the BBC soap opera EastEnders from January 2006 to February 2010. He has won several soap and magazine awards for his performance.

== Early life ==
Clements was born in Sidcup, Greater London. Before joining EastEnders he was studying for his A-levels (which he finished in 2005, aged 18) and working part-time in a Waitrose supermarket in Bromley.

== Career ==
In addition to being in EastEnders he has appeared in a variety of theatre and film roles and in The Bill. He appeared in a documentary, F*** Off, I'm Ginger, on 29 April 2007.

He is a member of the band Brooks Lives, in which he plays the lead and rhythm guitar, and has been since he was in Year 9, when he got his first Squier Stratocaster.

In 2005, Clements appeared in an episode of the UK police drama The Bill, playing Adrian Bickman, a character with high-functioning autism.

In November 2005, it was announced by the BBC that Clements would be joining EastEnders as Bradley Branning in early 2006. He was first seen on-screen on 24 January 2006. Clements left EastEnders in 2009, commenting that it was "time to move on and take on some new roles". Although the character died during the EastEnders live 25th anniversary episode on 19 February 2010, Clements is credited at the end of the episode on 22 February 2010. The police wanted to question Bradley regarding the death of Archie Mitchell, and was attempting to escape when he was spotted by them. The chase led to the rooftop of the Queen Victoria public house, and he died after falling from it. A newspaper later reported that Clements left the soap because he disliked the attention he got from being in such a high-profile television series, although during an appearance on Loose Women in February 2011, he declared that this was totally untrue, and said that he simply wanted to move on. Clements admitted that he was worried that he would struggle to find work after such a high profile role: "I don't know what I'm going to do, it's scary thinking about life after EastEnders, it takes up so much of your life. I guess it's auditions, auditions, auditions for me. I just hope I get work."

Clements played the part of David Filde in a touring production of The Haunting, a play based on a story by Charles Dickens. He said of the role: "I play a young book-dealer who has been sent to a manor house in the middle of the country to catalogue the books of the late Lord Gray, who was the father of Paul Nicholas' character. Then strange noises start happening and books begin to fly off shelves. From there it's a quest to find out what is going on in the house".

From 23 May to 16 June 2012, Clements played the role of Mick in Meredith Oakes's controversial play Faith at the Courtyard Theatre in Hoxton, London. In preparation for this role Clements underwent full military training sessions, and was photographed performing drills and exercises in Central London as a part of the publicity for the show.

On 26 October 2013, Clements appeared in Casualty, playing the role of Jake O'Reilly, who gets into trouble after he and his father find a bag of cash. Clements also made a cameo in the CBC's Murdoch Mysteries, appearing in season 8 episode 14, "Toronto's Girl Problem". In March 2015, Clements appeared on stage in Lone Star as Ray with Lunchtime Theatre London. In 2017, Clements appeared in the television documentary Elizabeth and Her Enemies, in which he played the role of the Earl of Essex.

== Personal life ==
Following his departure from EastEnders in 2010, Clements has married and had three children. He previously retired from acting to focus on the upbringing of his children, but has since returned to acting again.

== Awards ==
2006:

- Won Best Newcomer at the British Soap Awards
- Won Best Newcomer at the Inside Soap Awards
- Won Best Couple with Lacey Turner also at the Inside Soap Awards
- Won Best Soap Newcomer at the TV Quick Awards
- Won Most Popular Newcomer at the National Television Awards

2007:

- Won Best Soap Actor at the TV Quick Awards.
- Won Best Couple, again with Lacey Turner, at the Inside Soap Awards.
- Nominated and shortlisted in the top four for Most Popular Actor at the National Television Awards, but lost out to David Tennant.

2008:

- Nominated and shortlisted within the top four for Best Actor at the British Soap Awards, losing to Chris Fountain.
- Won Best Soap Actor at the TV Quick Awards
- Won Best Couple with Lacey Turner at the Inside Soap Awards for the third consecutive year (a record).

2010:

- Won Best Exit at British Soap Awards
- Won Best Exit at the Inside Soap Awards

== Filmography ==
- Holby City – Hughie Marsh (2018)
- Henry VIII & His Six Wives – Henry VIII. Channel 5 scripted drama and documentary (2016)
- Murdoch Mysteries – Charlie Brackenreid (2015)
- Casualty – Jake O'Reilly (2013)
- Coward (2012) – Skinner (short film)
- Popcorn (2007)
- EastEnders – Bradley Branning (2006–2010; 404 episodes)
- The Car – Pizza Boy (2005) (short film)
- The Bill – Adrian Bickman (2005)
- YoungBlood Theatre Company.
- A Carpet of Broken Glass – Michael (2004) (YoungBlood Theatre Company, Riverside Studios)
- Falling Apart - Nathan (2013) (short film) (Made within 48hrs)
