= Danny Mitchell (EastEnders) =

Fictional character from EastEnders

- EastEnders character
- Portrayed by: Liam Bergin
- Duration: 2010, 2016–2017
- First appearance: Episode 3935; 21 January 2010
- Last appearance: Episode 5429; 20 January 2017
- Introduced by: Diederick Santer (2010); Sean O'Connor (2016)
In-universe information
- Occupation: Motorcycle courier Barman
- Father: Nick Winterton
- Mother: Glenda Mitchell
- Half-sisters: Ronnie Mitchell; Roxy Mitchell
- Nephews: James Branning; Matthew Mitchell Cotton
- Nieces: Danielle Jones; Amy Mitchell

Danny Mitchell is a fictional character from the BBC soap opera EastEnders, played by soap newcomer Liam Bergin, who appeared from 21 January 2010 to 18 June 2010. He, along with his mother Glenda Mitchell (Glynis Barber), made a previously unannounced return on 30 December 2016, before departing again on 20 January 2017.

== Creation and casting ==
Danny's arrival and casting were announced on 26 December 2009. He arrives for his father Archie's funeral to meet his sisters Ronnie and Roxy. Archie did not know of Danny's existence before his death, as his mother Glenda left Archie after discovering she was pregnant. A secret son for Archie was discussed by the programme's makers for almost a year before the character was announced. However, later episodes reveal that Danny is not Archie's son.

The character is described as a "loveable rogue" and "a charmer with an eye for the ladies, while guys instantly see him as competition in the alpha male stakes." Speaking of his role, Bergin said: "The first time I walked into Albert Square and saw the Queen Vic was a very special moment and I'll have that memory forever. All of my on-screen family have made me feel very welcome from the first moment that I met them and I am enjoying every minute working here." Executive producer Diederick Santer said "Liam is a fine young actor, and a proper East Londoner, who I've been keen to bring into EastEnders for quite some time. His character Danny Mitchell is something of an enigma. [...] Is he simply [Ronnie and Roxy's] kid brother, keen to get to know his exciting big sisters? Or is there something else that he's after?" Bergin previously auditioned for another part in EastEnders early in 2009. Then he auditioned again for the part of Danny, but was not told the character was part of the Mitchell family, and was offered the part within 90 minutes of the audition. He was surprised when he was offered the part as he felt his audition did not go well. He started filming about a week and a half later.

=== Departure ===
Bergin said of his departure: "I've had a great six months working on EastEnders playing Danny. He has been a great character to play and without giving too much away, he's sure to ruffle a few feathers before he leaves Walford." He said the conclusion of Danny's storyline was "satisfying for [him] as an actor" and that it was the ending the audience deserves. He added that he knew the length of his contract from the start, and although there is always a possibility of a contract being extended, he could never see that happening with Danny. He later told All About Soap that he would love to return as Danny, as his storyline was left on a cliffhanger, and explained that Danny's final scenes were emotional with a final twist, saying "his exit sums the character up perfectly." Bergin later said that people used to jeer at him in the street saying: "I would get booed in the supermarket but, because he did everything with a smile, he had that energy about him that he was not really like that. People would boo me, although it wasn't aggressive. It was in a panto spirit."

== Storyline development ==
Discussing his relationship with the rest of the Mitchell family, Bergin assessed that Peggy is "the one person he wants to get on with" as she is the family matriarch. He felt that Danny genuinely likes and respects Peggy, impressed by her ability to handle trouble in the pub, explaining: "Danny wants to be liked and loved by the Mitchells and, most importantly, by Peggy." Asked why Danny desires to become part of the Mitchell family, Bergin responded: "He has no one else so maybe he wants to be part of a family. Or maybe it's because Roxy has suddenly got a lot of money. Perhaps he thinks a portion of that is rightfully his..." Bergin had heard speculation that his character may not be a Mitchell at all, but hoped that he is as he enjoyed being part of the family. Bergin stated that Danny did not deserve to be trusted, and Simons said she was unsure how trustworthy Danny is but said that Roxy likes him, adding "He's their baby brother, so Roxy really takes him under her wing and it's Roxy and Danny against the world for a little while. He's got a great story. There's loads of mystery that comes with it, so it's definitely one to watch!" Simons also praised the casting, noting facial similarities between Bergin and Lamb, though she had expected a blond-haired actor to take the role. Bergin said that Danny likes Roxy but because of her money he sees it as a big game, as he is a "money-driven lunatic."

== Storylines ==
Danny Mitchell first appeared when he visits his mother, Glenda (Glynis Barber), at her house unannounced. Though she is startled, Glenda allows her son to stay with her and he soon learns that her late ex-husband Archie Mitchell (Larry Lamb) had recently been murdered. The next day, Glenda takes Danny to Archie's obituary and gives him the address of The Queen Victoria public house in Walford where his sisters Ronnie (Samantha Womack) and Roxy (Rita Simons) live. Danny goes to The Queen Victoria and interrupts an argument between Ronnie and Roxy. Roxy tells Danny to go away they have just buried their father, to which Danny says he thinks they have just buried his father too. After a visit from Glenda to prove that Danny is who he claims to be, Danny gets talking to his sisters who ask him to stay. Glenda wants him to have nothing to do with them because Archie is still "inside their heads". However, he goes against Glenda's wishes. Phil Mitchell (Steve McFadden) is unhappy, thinking he is possibly a younger version of Archie. Danny starts working behind the bar of The Queen Victoria where he meets Amira Masood (Preeya Kalidas). He compliments her, and they later kiss, but the next day she tells him it was a stupid mistake. Peggy Mitchell (Barbara Windsor) overhears Danny on the phone to Glenda and is furious, asking him to leave. Roxy insists that Peggy does not make the rules, but Danny decides to go anyway and packs his things. Before he leaves the Square, Amira's husband Syed Masood (Marc Elliott) confronts him about the kiss, but he assures Syed he will never be returning.

Several weeks later, Peggy receives a call from the police station. When she gets there, she finds Danny shouting to be let out, bloodied and bruised. He explains he had an argument with Glenda and left home, then got in a drunken fight and was put in cells to sober up. He tells her he hoped Roxy would come as Peggy hates him, but she confirms his identity and he is able to leave. He reunited with Roxy who is very pleased to see him, and after a heart-to-heart with Peggy, he vows to help her get The Queen Victoria back from Roxy. Roxy is angry with him for putting the bust of Queen Victoria back on the bar as it was used to kill Archie, but he tells her it is what Archie would have done and she should make him proud. He later sabotages a pump at the pub so Roxy is forced to ask for Peggy's help, and convinces Roxy to buy the beauty salon that is coming up for auction. He is befriended by Janine Butcher (Charlie Brooks), who wants to turn him against his family in order to get Roxy's inheritance. Ronnie tells Roxy he cannot be trusted, but he reveals Janine's plan, cementing his place in the Mitchell family. He and Glenda then plan to con Roxy out of her inheritance themselves. He later tells Ronnie that Roxy has hardly any money left because she is spending it on expensive things she hardly uses.

Roxy is curious when Danny asks her for a £700 investment, which he later returns in full, having apparently made a profit. She asks him if she can invest £1,000 for his friend to do the same for her, and she is satisfied when she sees him going into a building and meeting somebody. Danny speaks to Glenda on the telephone and tells her to pack a bag. Later, Roxy overhears him on the phone saying he can get a bigger return if he invested more money, so she offers to go halves with him. Danny thinks Ronnie may have figured out his plan when she asks to invest as well, and says he was too late and the deal is off. Glenda arrives in a taxi and Danny tells her he thinks Ronnie is on to him, to which Glenda says they cannot leave empty handed and Ronnie cannot stop them. Glenda urges Danny to find out if Ronnie knows. Ronnie denies overhearing Danny's telephone conversation with Glenda, though Danny tells Glenda that Ronnie is playing games with him. Danny gives Glenda a plane ticket to the United States and says he'll meet her at the airport. Ronnie tells Danny she has worked it out—that Danny is seeing someone. Danny agrees and says it is a married woman, and then calls Glenda to say Ronnie knows about their scheme and Glenda should leave on her own. However, she simply tears up the ticket. Danny convinces Roxy to open a joint-signature account so he can help control her money. Glenda returns reveal the plan to Ronnie, after which Roxy catches him putting her cash in a bag. He blames Glenda and Roxy believes him. Roxy attempts to evict her mother but she reveals bruises on her arm and says that Danny has been hitting her. Danny says he is entitled to a share of Archie's money, so Glenda reveals to her daughters that Danny knows Archie was not his father. Danny denies this but Glenda insists it is true, saying that Danny has lied about his middle name being Archie. Ronnie asks to see his driver's license for proof but he says he does not know where it is. Eventually Roxy tells Danny to leave, as she believes her mother over her brother. As Danny leaves, Glenda offers him a key to her flat, revealing her eviction was a lie. In 2011, when Glenda leaves Walford, she moves back into her flat with Danny.

In 2016, Glenda returns to Walford and receives a phonecall from Danny asking her of her whereabouts. A few months later, Glenda returns looking for Roxy, as she has borrowed £3,000 from her and Danny before disappearing. At the end of the year, Roxy calls Glenda to collect her from Walford because she realises she needs help because of her cocaine habit; Glenda and Danny both collect Roxy. The next day, Danny and Glenda bring Roxy back to Walford to collect her things, and Ronnie invites them to her second wedding to Jack Branning (Scott Maslen) that day. After the wedding, Ronnie and Roxy both drown in the hotel swimming pool. Danny supports an emotional Glenda when she identifies Ronnie and Roxy's bodies with Jack and his brother Max Branning (Jake Wood). Danny shows indifference to his half-sisters' deaths and asks about inheritance but is forced to end the subject when Glenda emotionally breaks down as a result of her grief. Danny flirts with Whitney Carter (Shona McGarty) but she pushes him away when he tries to kiss her. When Glenda intends to take custody of Matthew, Danny tells Jack that he can get Glenda to change her mind in exchange for £20,000, so Jack attacks Danny shortly before Glenda tells Jack that she is not doing it for financial gain. She slaps Danny upon learning of his plan and Jack throws him out.

== Reception ==
After Danny's departure was announced that Ruth Deller of website Lowculture opined that she would be glad to see him leave, as he was "introduced rather randomly, he has had little purpose ever since, other than to make everyone else's acting look better. There's no intrigue to him, no charisma, no character development—nothing except floppy hair and moping around like a teenager from 1993." In their 1 January 2011 issue, Inside Soap branded Danny as one of 2010's departed characters that would not be remembered.

== See also ==
- List of soap opera villains
