= Amira Masood =

Fictional character from EastEnders

- EastEnders character
- Portrayed by: Preeya Kalidas
- Duration: 2009–2012
- First appearance: Episode 3784; 7 May 2009
- Last appearance: Episode 4530; 12 November 2012
- Introduced by: Diederick Santer (2009); Bryan Kirkwood (2011); Lorraine Newman (2012)
In-universe information
- Other names: Amira Shah (maiden name)
- Occupation: Caterer; Beautician; Market stall holder
- Father: Qadim Shah
- Mother: Shahana Shah
- Husband: Syed Masood (2010–2012)
- Daughters: Yasmin Masood

Amira Masood (also Shah) is a fictional character from the BBC soap opera EastEnders, played by Preeya Kalidas. The girlfriend, and later wife, of Syed Masood (Marc Elliott), Amira first appeared on screen in the episode broadcast on 7 May 2009. The character was described as high maintenance, lonely and insecure. Amira and Syed's wedding on 1 January 2010 was watched by an average of 11.64 million viewers. Kalidas quit the show in January 2010 to concentrate on a career in music, filming her final scenes in March 2010. Her final episode was broadcast on 26 April 2010, after Amira discovered that her husband was gay and had been having an affair with Christian Clarke (John Partridge). She returned on EastEnders on 10 October 2011, but appeared in two extra scenes available on BBC Online and BBC Red Button called Amira's Secret, on 6 and 8 September 2011. The character departed on 8 March 2012. On 11 September 2012, it was confirmed that Kalidas would return to play Amira once more in a brief guest appearance, in the buildup to the permanent departure of Syed and Christian from the show. She returned on 6 November 2012, and departed once more on 12 November 2012.

== Casting ==
=== Introduction and first departure ===
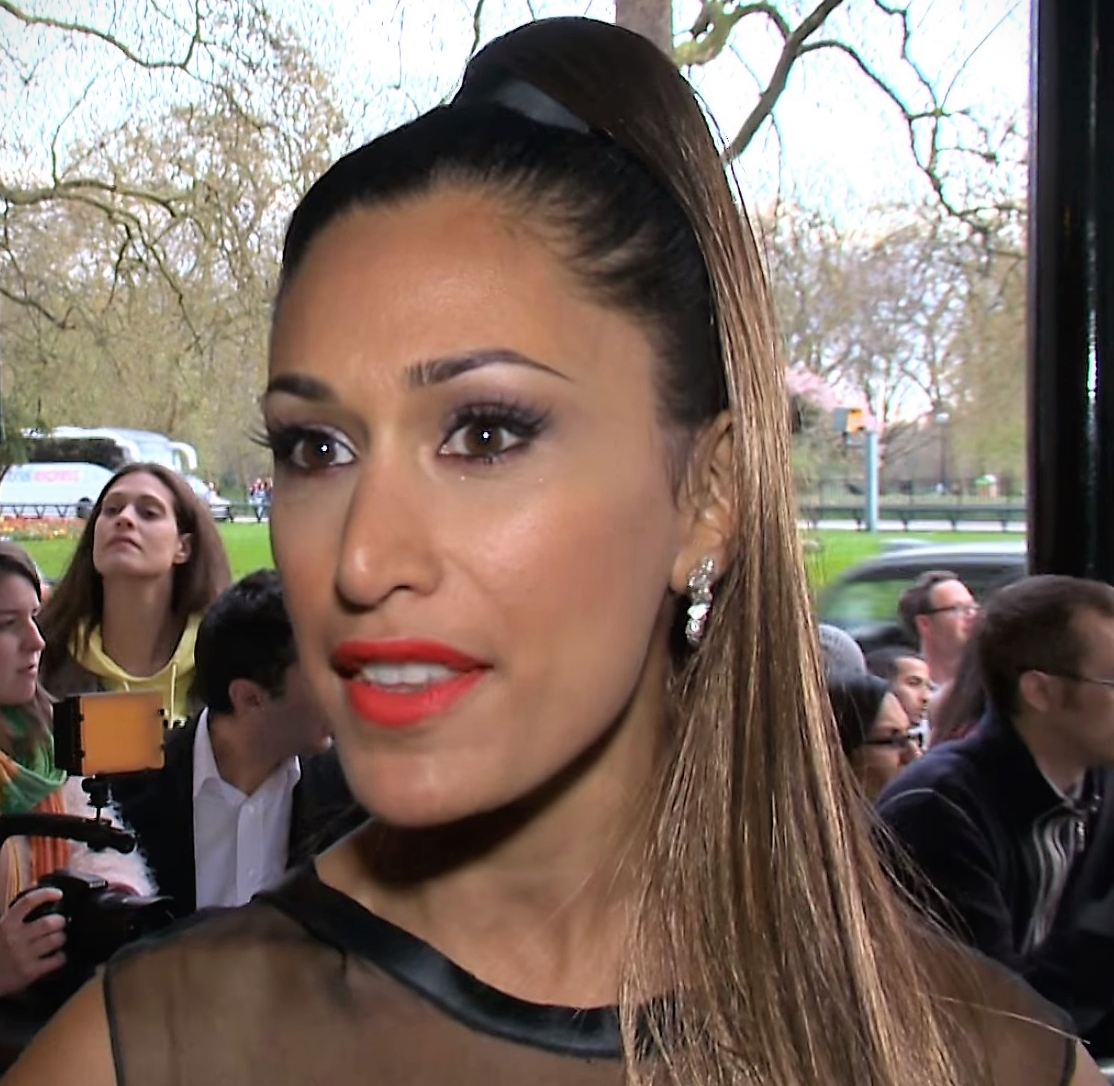
Preeya Kalidas (pictured) portrayed Amira.

Amira is introduced as the girlfriend of character Syed Masood, played by Marc Elliott. She made her first on-screen appearance on 7 May 2009. On 24 January 2010, it was announced that Kalidas had quit the show to concentrate on a career in music. According to Kalidas, her final scenes were filmed on 5 March and were shown on 26 April 2010. Kalidas teased about her exit the day it was transmitted. She told BBC News: "We were quite looking forward to this moment and we're both really excited about playing these scenes tonight. It was really emotional and really quite traumatic and really hard for us when we were doing it." She added: "She does leave but it's who she leaves with, and [under] what terms?" Marc Elliott commented: "I think the audience is ready now to see some sort of conclusion to a story that's been bubbling for a bit. John is brilliant and it's been fantastic building up to this moment, and we've had lots of emotion along the way." Kalidas said it was upsetting to watch her final scenes. Speaking to Holy Soap, Kalidas said: "I watched the aftermath of when Amira left because I had no idea what was going to happen. It was really upsetting. It was actually quite distressing. It was all very sad and everyone was down in the dumps. The moment that was really upsetting was when Zainab told Syed she would rather he died than being gay. That was so heartbreaking."

=== Return, second departure and final return ===
It was reported on 11 July 2011 that Kalidas would reprise her role as Amira from "autumn" 2011. A source for the show said, "Amira left Walford a heartbroken woman. When she finds out Syed is planning to marry Christian she is furious. Amira is manipulative and her presence looks set to turn the lives of the Masoods upside down. The question is, has she moved on from her husband or will she do whatever she can to get him back? Only time will tell." Amira returns with daughter Yasmin, of whom Syed is the father of. Nina Wadia said she can't wait for Syed's baby to come. She predicted that it will help Zainab and Syed get closer as she'll want her grandchild and it may make her feel like her son is a proper man. Amira eventually gives up on trying to win Syed back, and after he and Christian offer to buy her out of the business, Amira makes her exit. However, she leaves her daughter, Yasmin, behind. Amira departed on 8 March 2012. Speaking to Lorraine in April 2012, Kalidas said that it's possible that Amira would return again. She said that Amira has been through a lot and that her life needs to be sorted out. She added: "It was really difficult playing her because there were so many times when I thought, 'You poor thing — just be strong'. And by the end of it she was, and she left!" Kalidas also said that Amira needs some time out.

On 11 September 2012, it was confirmed that Kalidas would reprise the role again in a temporary appearance, in the buildup to the permanent departure of Syed and Christian from the show.

== Development ==
=== Personality ===
The character was described by actress Preeya Kalidas as "a bit of a socialite [who] kind of kicks up a bit of fuss in Albert Square." Elliot revealed that "she's a rich daddy's girl and it's hard not to make the association between Syed and money. There's certainly an honest attraction there and I think he does love her. But the money that her father has might be an additional aspect of their relationship. Amira comes in and ruffles a few feathers, especially [Syed's mother] Zainab's. Obviously with Syed being a mummy's boy, she has to have her say. I don't think Zainab would be happy with anyone that Syed's with — they'd have to be absolutely perfect. Mummy Masood will be doing a lot of meddling and locking horns with Amira." She has also been described as "very high maintenance", "spoilt and snobbish" and "a lonely and insecure girl". The BBC website describes Amira as "beautiful", "spoilt" and "unashamed snob" but also "charming and fun".

Princess Amira is stunning, spoilt and a snob to boot. Several Walford men have fallen under her spell, not least her brother-in-law-to-be Tamwar, who made an ill-conceived drunken lunge at her on his birthday – earning himself a smack across the face for his efforts. She might look like butter wouldn’t melt, but looks can be deceiving. Amira married heart-throb Syed, before realising his heart actually belonged to Christian. She left the square under a dark cloud, but watch out Chryed — she's back!

— The BBC's description of Amira (2011)

=== Storyline development ===
Kalidas insisted that "Amira truly loves Syed". She explained to Digital Spy at the British Soap Awards: "Her world collapses around her, so she ends up coming back to Syed, the man she truly loves. Amira does move in with [Janine] and we have some really great exchanges actually. Some very strong women together in one household."

Syed and Amira go on to marry on 1 January 2010. They have a traditional Pakistani wedding featuring horses, drummers and dancers. Scriptwriters researched by watching videos of a real British Pakistani wedding. The wedding and its build-up were filmed over a two-week period, and Kalidas was in full costume for one of them, including make-up and mehndi designs on her hands, which took two and a half hours to apply each day. BBC Asian Network reporter Shabnam Mahmood, who advised on the wedding, revealed "the mehndi was done by Pavan – the fastest mehndi artist in the world." Amira's dress and scarf were handmade and the costume was bought in an Asian boutique in East London and sent to India for a fitting. Kalidas described it as "really heavy" due to its beading detail. She said: "Although I really loved the outfit, after day five I couldn't wait to take it off." Although credited with the name Amira Masood on the BBC website after the wedding episode, actor Nitin Ganatra (on-screen father-in-law Masood Ahmed) has stated that according to naming convensions in Pakistani culture, her name should be Amira Syed.

When Amira returns to EastEnders, Kalidas explained that she will still have feelings for Syed. She told All About Soap: "She knows Syed has been in touch and I think, deep down, she still loves him. She wants to confront the man who broke her heart, no matter how much pain the situation causes her. She also doesn't want her daughter to grow up without knowing her father. A little part of her thinks they may end up back together — it's just a small glimmer of hope. Amira has this idealistic view that they could become a proper family unit. Finding out that Christian and Syed are due to get married is Amira's worst nightmare. She hasn't had a chance to move on from her life with Syed and the baby she had with him is a constant reminder of it."

Kalidas warned that Yusef Khan should be "more wary" of playing games with Amira. She told Inside Soap: "Amira would be devastated if she found out what Yusef was doing behind her back, because it's another barrier to her being with Syed," Kalidas told Inside Soap. Her reputation is already in tatters and she's an outcast in her community. And now Yusef is suggesting she was unfaithful. Everything's going wrong for her again. I'm sure Yusef thinks he's being really clever, but he doesn't know who he's messing with. Amira might just start some scheming of her own. She may have had a really tough time recently, but she's also a fighter and she's pretty defiant. When she really wants something, she'll go for it!"

== Storylines ==
=== Backstory ===
Amira's backstory was revealed in an interview with Kalidas: "Amira doesn't have a mother, as she died when she was really young. She lives with her father, who's a big businessman — she met Syed through him. Her dad works in property, so Amira comes from wealth. One day her father just disappears, so she has no one else and her house is repossessed. She only has her clothes."

=== 2009–2012 ===
Amira is the girlfriend of Syed Masood (Marc Elliott), the son of established characters Masood Ahmed (Nitin Ganatra) and Zainab Masood (Nina Wadia). She arrives when Zainab invites her for dinner. Syed's brother Tamwar (Himesh Patel) reveals to Amira that Syed is not as successful as she believes. She insults the family and Masood asks her to leave, and her relationship with Syed ends. She returns a month later to meet Syed in the park, and they talk until he becomes suspicious of her. The next day she arrives unexpectedly, claiming her father Qadim (Ramon Tikaram) has disappeared and she is homeless. Syed attempts to hide her upstairs but her presence is soon known throughout the family. She then rents a room in a nearby flat. Still trying to get into Zainab's good books, Amira takes over at Bushra Abbasi's (Pooja Ghai) event and sings beautifully to the guests. She begins to get to know Albert Square and its residents, and gets a job at Tanya Branning's (Jo Joyner) beauty salon.

Syed proposes to Amira and she readily accepts. However, she soon confesses to Zainab that her father is in Pentonville Prison for fraud. Zainab is initially angry, but says that if she keeps Syed happy, the wedding will go ahead. Amira then starts planning for the wedding, and enlists a reluctant Christian Clarke (John Partridge) to help her. She tells Masood that he should not pay for her wedding to Syed and she is going to visit Qadim. When she does, he reacts badly to the news that she is engaged to Syed and refuses to give them his blessing. She gives him the option of either accepting him as her fiancé or that he will not be contacted again. She later takes money from his safety deposit box for the wedding without his knowledge, saying he has no need for it. She worries about her wedding when Christian goes to Spain and when she finds out her father's legal team has found a loophole in order to free him. During the Mehndi celebration, Amira is shocked to see that her father has walked in. The next day, she is forced to tell Zainab and Masood that Qadim did not give his blessing and she stole the money. Qadim arrives and Syed reveals they took the money but Amira interrupts and says it was her idea. Qadim orders her to pack her bags but she defies him. Qadim says he will expect the money in cash the next day and leaves, after which, Amira says the Masoods are her family now. Qadim comes back the next day and agrees to give his blessing and pay for the wedding after realising how much Masood has done for Amira. She marries Syed, not knowing that he has come out to his mother as gay and is in love with Christian.

After their honeymoon, Amira applies for work at The Queen Victoria public house and meets Danny Mitchell (Liam Bergin), who compliments her, but she realises she is not cut out for that work. She decides to go back to work at Masala Queen, the family's curry business, and when she is alone with Syed, she dresses up sexily in an attempt to seduce him, as they have still not consummated the marriage. Syed tells her to get dressed as anybody could see her, so she leaves. Danny finds her in the Square and they kiss. The next day she regrets it and tells Danny it was a stupid mistake. Amira sleeps on the sofa and tells Zainab it is because Syed kicks her in his sleep. She tells Chelsea Fox (Tiana Benjamin) she kissed another man and says she is still a virgin and assumes Syed is too, and Chelsea encourages her to tell Syed about the kiss. Amira and Syed talk and she thinks he does not find her attractive, and tells him that she kissed Danny. Syed says it is not that but he is nervous about sleeping with her. After Syed confronts Danny, Syed and Amira sleep together and talk about starting a family. After the birth of Syed's brother Kamil, Syed again talks about starting a family, but is shocked to discover Amira taking birth control tablets. She says a baby was Zainab's idea and she is not ready for the responsibility of motherhood, but Syed tells her he cannot trust her. They later both agree to wait to try for a baby, but after spending time with Kamil, Amira tells Syed she is feeling broody and throws away her tablets.

Amira starts working back at the salon, this time for Roxy Mitchell (Rita Simons), who has taken over. She receives a cheque for £5000 from her father and decides to use it to put a deposit on a flat to rent with Syed. Amira's increasing frustration with her husband's distance from her leads her to confide in Christian and ask for advice. Christian's advice works and Syed and Amira make love, which the next day Amira tells Christian was "perfect". Shortly after this Amira believes she could be pregnant so announces to the family that she is. Chelsea tells her to take a pregnancy test, but it is negative. Amira eventually admits to Syed that she is not pregnant, and as they decide to try for a baby again, Amira sees the words "Syed loves Christian" painted on a wall in their bedroom unaware it was painted by Lucy Beale (Melissa Suffield). She refuses to believe it, even after Syed and Christian tell her Syed is gay, and runs to the Masoods' house. Syed follows, and Zainab and Masood calm the situation until Christian arrives. Amira is unable to control her emotions and breaks down. Qadim demands to know why Amira is scared of Christian, so Syed reveals that he's a gay man in a sham marriage. As a heartbroken Amira packs her bags, Chelsea tells her that she got the pregnancy tests mixed up. Amira asks her to keep the pregnancy a secret, and as she drives out of Walford with her father, she clutches her stomach and smiles. Three days later, Qadim returns to Walford, looking for Syed, and reveals that Amira is unable to eat or drink due to the recent revelation.

In 2011, Syed and Christian decide to try to find Amira so Syed can divorce her and marry Christian in a civil partnership. Amira is seen at home where her father says someone visited him with a message from Syed, which shocks Amira. She tries to call Syed behind her father's back, but he snatches the phone and drops onto the road. Amira then secretly calls an unknown source, giving Syed's address and surname. Amira confesses to Qadim that she phoned Zainab because she believes Syed wants to reconcile, and is devastated to learn Syed only wants a divorce so he can marry Christian. It is revealed that Amira has a daughter. Syed discovers that Zainab had Amira's contact details and phoned her, however when her father answers, he informs Syed that Amira had left two weeks ago without a forwarding address. Several weeks later, Amira leaves several messages for Zainab, although determined for Syed not to find Amira, Zainab ignores them. Later, Yusef Khan (Ace Bhatti) phones Amira and agrees to meet her in a park, although he is stunned when she turns up with her baby daughter, Yasmin, telling Yusef that Syed is the father. Shortly after, Amira arrives in Walford, wanting to speak to Syed and she is devastated when she walks in on Syed and Christian announcing their engagement. When Syed sees her, she storms out, although she later confesses that he is a father, showing him a picture of Yasmin. When Christian approaches her, she sprays perfume in his eyes.

Amira tells Syed that she will allow him to see Yasmin in the flesh, but Christian cannot come anywhere near her. Shortly after, she returns to Walford with Yasmin and introduces her to Masood, Tamwar and Tamwar's wife, Afia (Meryl Fernandes). When Syed and Christian come round to see her, she tells Syed that he must choose between Christian and Yasmin and a furious Syed tells her she will be hearing from their solicitor. As Amira is leaving, Syed runs out and meets his daughter for the first time. He agrees to secretly meet with Amira in a park so that he can spend more time with Yasmin, although he does not tell Christian. Both Syed and Amira are pleased when father and daughter bond and Amira tries to manipulate Syed into spending more time with them. When Yusef learns that Amira has been seeing Syed, he tells her that she is not wanted by the Masood family. Amira ignores him, and attends a family dinner where Zainab sees Yasmin for the first time. Amira and Zainab then both try to manipulate Syed into spending more time with his daughter, including organising a family party for Yasmin's birthday. Yusef phones Qadim and tells him that Amira has been seeing the Masoods, he storms round to the party and demands that Amira and Yasmin return with him. Amira refuses, and Qadim leaves stating that Amira is no longer his daughter. Christian then reveals that he had a paternity test performed, which proves that Syed is not the father of Yasmin. Syed is devastated, but Amira continues to claim that he is the father. However, it emerges that Yusef falsified the results of the paternity test. Amira and Yasmin then stay with Syed and Christian, having nowhere else to go. Christian eventually accepts them staying and although Amira says Christian can be a full part of Yasmin's life, she asks Yusef for help to get Syed back, and in return helps to get Zainab back on side with Yusef. Yusef orchestrates Christian being falsely accused of touching 15-year-old Ben Mitchell (Joshua Pascoe). Syed doubts Christian again, leading to Christian breaking up with Syed and leaving Walford. Though Amira is concerned by Yusef's scheming tactics, she is pleased that Christian has left. However, Yusef suggests that Christian may return at any time, and that Amira's best hope of keeping Syed would be to move to Pakistan with him. Amira then invents a phoney business opportunity in Pakistan to lure Syed there.

Christian returns to Walford to spend Christmas with his sister Jane Beale (Laurie Brett), and attempts to make Syed jealous by kissing other men. Syed realises he loves Christian, and attempts to phone him, however, before they meet, Amira pretends to fall down the stairs and hurt her ankle, using it as an opportunity to seduce Syed, though this fails. Syed gets Qadim involved and Amira eventually agrees to divorce Syed, but tells him she is not leaving Walford with Qadim, although this does not stop Syed and Christian reuniting. After Anthony Moon (Matt Lapinskas) removes a cockroach for Amira, he develops a crush on her and attempts to impress her. She invites him to a family dinner as a friend, but it becomes awkward. Later, Amira and Anthony get together on the stall and kiss, which starts a relationship between them both. After this, Amira moves into Anthony's after a candlelit dinner with him. After having a small argument with Christian, who tells Amira that her relationship with Anthony is merely a smokescreen to cover up the feelings she still has for Syed, Amira goes to Anthony and they have sex for the first time. However, she cries afterwards and appears to regret it. She tells Lauren Branning (Jacqueline Jossa) that the sex felt wrong, empty and cheap, and Anthony overhears this. She tells him that it is about how she feels and not him, but he gets angry. She says she is a bad mother, and has been unhappy all her life. She calls Anthony a fool for liking her, then goes to Syed and tells him she has to leave as she knows that he will never love her, and asks him to look after Yasmin for a while. She returns a few months later to ask Syed for Yasmin back, as she is getting married and moving to Birmingham. Syed eventually agrees but when Christian finds out he tries to stop her. Syed tells him that it is for the best and after agreeing to stay in touch, Amira and Yasmin depart after a tearful goodbye.

== Reception ==
The episode shown on 1 January 2010, in which Syed marries Amira, received overnight ratings of 11.64 million viewers, an average audience share of 39.3%. The final five minutes of the episode received a peak of 12.34 million viewers. The wedding was criticised by a writer for Asian Image, who said "With so much resources at hand they couldn't even get a Muslim wedding right. It was colourful and noisy but the priest couldn't speak the lingo properly and the wedding vows were all wrong. What was the priest doing sat between the bride and groom? At least attempt to make it as realistic as possible. It was Indian and then Pakistani – what on earth was going on! For a prime-time show which was watched by millions at least try to get as close to a real Pakistani Muslim wedding as possible. The whole thing reminded me of one of 1960s botched jobs put together by some middle-aged white man who 'thought it happened this way so it must!'"
