= Glenda Mitchell =

Fictional character from EastEnders

- EastEnders character
- Glynis Barber as Glenda Mitchell (2010)
- Portrayed by: Glynis Barber (2010–2017); Rose Reynolds (2022 flashback)
- Duration: 2010–2011, 2016–2017, 2022
- First appearance: Episode 3927; 7 January 2010
- Last appearance: Episode 6550; 5 September 2022
- Introduced by: Diederick Santer (2010); Dominic Treadwell-Collins (2016); Sean O'Connor (2016); Chris Clenshaw (2022)
In-universe information
- Occupation: Barmaid; Bookmaker; Club manager
- Family: Mitchell
- Husband: Archie Mitchell (backstory)
- Sons: Danny Mitchell
- Daughters: Ronnie Mitchell; Roxy Mitchell
- Grandsons: James Branning; Matthew Mitchell Cotton
- Granddaughters: Danielle Jones; Amy Mitchell
- Uncles: Daniel

Glenda Mitchell is a fictional character from the BBC soap opera EastEnders, played by Glynis Barber. The character first appeared in the programme on 7 January 2010. She left the show on 8 March 2011, and returned for two episodes in January 2016 and three in May 2016. She made an unannounced return on the 30 December 2016 episode for the departures of her two daughters. She made her second departure from the show on 10 February 2017. Glenda has been described as "complex", "vulnerable"," "demure, dynamic and assured". She is the former wife of Archie Mitchell (Larry Lamb); and mother of Ronnie (Samantha Womack), Roxy (Rita Simons) and Danny Mitchell (Liam Bergin).

Glenda is the estranged mother of Ronnie and Roxy Mitchell, whom she abandoned 21 years before her appearance in the series. In mid-2010, it transpires that Glenda knew about Archie sexually abusing Ronnie. She had sex with Archie's nephew Phil (Steve McFadden) and Phil's stepson Ian Beale (Adam Woodyatt), before later being accused of having stolen Roxy's money – although it is later revealed that Phil actually stole it. When Glenda reveals Phil's affair to Shirley Carter (Linda Henry), Shirley intimidates Glenda, leading her to leave Walford in March 2011. She returned in January 2016 after Roxy's attempted rape by Dean Wicks (Matt Di Angelo) and in December 2016 for Ronnie's wedding, before leaving again on 10 February 2017, following the deaths of Ronnie and Roxy from drowning in a hotel swimming pool.

A younger version of Glenda appeared in a flashback episode that aired on 5 September 2022, being portrayed by Rose Reynolds, with the episode focusing on the Mitchell family in the 1970s.

== Creation ==
=== Casting ===
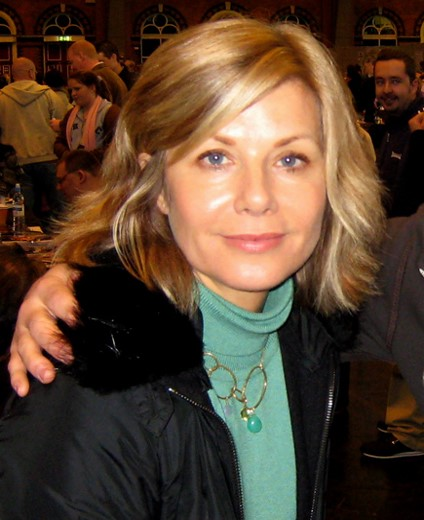
Glynis Barber (pictured) portrayed Glenda Mitchell.

On 17 October 2009, it was announced on the EastEnders website that veteran actress Jill Gascoine had been cast as Glenda, and would appear in 2010. She is the mother of established characters Ronnie (Samantha Womack) and Roxy Mitchell (Rita Simons), and former wife of Archie Mitchell (Larry Lamb). On casting, the show's executive producer Diederick Santer stated: "I'm so looking forward to welcoming the hugely talented Jill to EastEnders. I have a very clear memory of watching C.A.T.S. Eyes every Friday night, [and] Jill's character, Maggie Forbes, was always my favourite – tough, glamorous, and exciting – perfect qualities for Glenda Mitchell." On joining the show Gascoine added: "I'm thrilled to be joining the cast of EastEnders and I am really excited to be back on British TV." However, it was announced on 23 October 2009 that Gascoine withdrew from her filming commitments during her first day on set, as she felt that she "lacked the right experience to film such a big continuing drama". She said "I was so looking forward to playing Glenda but having spent the last 15 years working in America [...] I felt, on arrival, I lacked the right experience to film such a big continuing drama. I have tremendous respect for EastEnders and the cast, so I didn't want to let the show or my fellow cast members down."

"I rushed in, they gave me Glenda's back-story and I didn't even have time to read all the scripts before I started filming. I didn't even know all the storyline, so in the first week, I filmed the character on a need-to-know basis. Each day I filmed, I learned a little more about her, so I had to make decisions about how to play her based on the information I had each day. It was very interesting to do as I've never had to do that before."

— Glynis Barber describes her first day

The part was subsequently recast to Glynis Barber. Barber said in an interview with media website Digital Spy: "I think they originally cast Jill [Gascoine] because she's of a similar age to Barbara [Windsor] and on screen, they're sisters-in-law, so it made total sense. The fact that they then cast me was a sign of the complete desperation to get someone quickly! To be perfectly honest, though, I think it worked out really well." She added "Glenda's very important in the whole Mitchell saga and because I had to come in at such short notice, within 24 hours of meeting [the cast], I was on set shooting 38 pages of dialogue! If someone had said to me beforehand, 'You're playing this really important character, Ronnie and Roxy's mum, you're a Mitchell, you have tons and tons of dialogue', I'd probably have been so nervous and completely freaked-out. It's a real blessing that I had no time to have a single nervous thought. There was no time for nerves and no time to over-think it." She explained that on her first day, she was told Glenda's backstory and had no time to read all the scripts, filming the character "on a need-to-know basis." Barber initially appeared in nine episodes in January 2010, and returned again on 2 April 2010.

=== Characterisation ===
The character is described as "polished, demure, dynamic and assured"—a complete contrast to the nervous and quiet woman the Mitchell family knew previously—and is said to cause a shock when she turns up in Walford unannounced. In December 2009, Santer hinted that Glenda would provide intrigue for fans of the Mitchell family following Archie's murder, saying "The question for the audience—and for the rest of the Mitchells—is what does she want? On the face of it, she wants Archie's money because his will is read—and she's the original Mrs Mitchell. But is there more going on than just her being a gold digger? I'd suggest that there is." Barber described Glenda as having "a real edge, but at the same time, she's very vulnerable. She's such a complex character, too. Generally, what she's saying is true but the words she's encasing them in are lies." Soap opera reporting website Holy Soap describe Glenda as having "cougar qualities", being a "glamorous granny", "feisty" and a "blonde bombshell".

In August 2010, Barber told Inside Soap that although the character comes across "as devious or a bitch", she simply tries to portray her as genuine, but the more genuine she attempts to make Glenda appear, the more devious she appears. Barber later said that she dislikes her character and would not trust Glenda as a friend as she is only interested in men, and Glenda was described by Carol on screen as "not a woman's woman". However, Barber said that Glenda would be fun to be with on a night out.

== Development ==
"I found it a very difficult thing to get my head around, because if Glenda knew her child was being hurt all along, then she's a complete monster. So the way I played it was to try to justify why she pushed aside the uneasy feeling she had about what was taking place. She didn't want to think about anything that horrible."

— Glynis Barber

In August 2010, scenes reveal that Glenda already knew that Archie abused Ronnie as a child. Barber admitted: "Viewers say to me, 'Oh she's an absolute bitch,' before telling me how much they love her. What's funny is that I've never played Glenda as a baddy. But the more genuine I try to make her, the more devious she appears to the audience!"

Speaking of the storyline where Glenda and Roxy attempt to steal Roxy's money back from Phil, Barber explained that Glenda is "a woman scorned, and wants to fleece Phil for everything he's got." Phil frames Glenda for stealing the money, on which Barber told Inside Soap that Glenda is devastated that her daughter believes Phil: "Glenda doesn't think that Roxy will take Phil's word over hers, so she's devastated when she does. It makes no sense—Glenda is broke, so why would she leave a pile of money in her bedroom cupboard? She instantly knows that Phil planted the cash there. Glenda's so hurt that Roxy believes him instead of her." This leads to Glenda revealing her affair with Phil. When Shirley discovers the affair, she attacks Glenda.

Glenda's departure from the series was confirmed on 27 February 2011, with Barber writing on her official website, "2010 was a busy and exciting year for me playing Glenda Mitchell in EastEnders. After Glenda manages to alienate practically everyone on Albert Square, she makes her exit in March 2011. But will she be back in the future to wreak more havoc? Well 'she ain't dead' so anything is possible... watch this space!" Her final on-screen appearance is on 8 March 2011. Barber said that Glenda's exit was emotional to film and explained that the character is hurt and humiliated. As Glenda has been rejected by both Roxy and Ronnie, Barber said that Glenda is "all alone in the world" without them. The door was left open for Glenda to return in the future, and Barber hoped that if Glenda did return, it would be to exact revenge on Phil as she would not be able to let go of what he had done, or with a new man or much money.

== Storylines ==
=== Backstory ===
Glenda is the estranged mother of Ronnie (Samantha Womack) and Roxy Mitchell (Rita Simons), and estranged former wife of Archie Mitchell (Larry Lamb). Barber commented on Glenda's backstory in an interview with Digital Spy, saying "[Archie] was an abusive bully. An abused woman can be intimidated, but at the same time think they need the man and they're scared to leave because the bully convinces them that they need each other. That's different to love. Glenda didn't love Archie but she loved her girls. However, because she didn't love Archie, she was able to leave – she had to get away. She's a very strong-minded and tough woman. Leaving an opulent lifestyle, her daughters, her family, a big house and her protective husband behind was a risk. She had no qualifications and she's had to live by her wits." She also said, "When she lived with Archie, he was very controlling of her. Even though she lived in a beautiful house and had a glamorous lifestyle, life became unbearable and she had very genuine reasons for going off. She's never got back to the life she once had, and it's been very tough for her ever since."

Glenda married Archie in 1968 following which they had two daughters, Ronnie and Roxy, and lived in Limehouse and Romford. In a flashback episode to 1979, Glenda struggles with motherhood as well as with Archie's infidelities. As their marriage progressed, she watched as Archie controlled and abused Ronnie. She had an affair with a man named Nick Winterton, who promised to leave his wife, but never did. In 1989, Glenda became pregnant by Nick and left Archie, deciding she did not want him to control another of her children, leaving Ronnie when she was five months pregnant. Her son Danny (Liam Bergin) was born but she did not tell Archie, Ronnie nor Roxy about him. Since her departure from her daughters' lives, Roxy could not forgive her for abandoning them, but Ronnie was more understanding, as she witnessed the change that occurred in their mother through Archie's abuse. Archie told their daughters that Glenda was living in Australia and Ronnie wrote to her regularly, but this turned out to be another lie, because she was living in Brixton. She attempted to track Ronnie and Roxy down once, but finding they had moved on, she gave up looking for her daughters.

=== 2010–2011 ===
Glenda comes to Walford after reading about Archie's murder in a newspaper. She walks in just as Peggy Mitchell (Barbara Windsor) has said Ronnie and Roxy are still her girls, to which Glenda disagrees. Glenda explains that Peggy is not their stepmother as she and Archie never divorced. Ronnie is upset that Glenda has only talked about herself. Glenda stays overnight and the next day she tells her daughters about her life in France. Ronnie, Roxy and Glenda then start to get along. Peggy receives a phone call during Archie's will reading saying that Archie and Glenda were divorced. Glenda says she did not sign anything but Archie's lawyer, Emma West (Ellie Beaven), says if she was untraceable for two years then her signature would not have been needed. Glenda later reveals that she never lived in France, but instead lives in a council estate in London. Ronnie says she is just like Archie, and just before she leaves Ronnie asks her why she left them, and she reveals that she was pregnant. Ronnie, with the help of her former boyfriend Jack Branning (Scott Maslen), tracks Glenda down and pays her a visit, demanding to know if what she said was true. Glenda tells Ronnie about Danny, and says he does not know he has sisters, as she wanted a new life and kept no pictures of her daughters. Ronnie then tells Glenda about her daughter Danielle Jones (Lauren Crace) and shows her a picture but Glenda shows little interest. When she calls Ronnie by the name Veronica, this upsets her and she leaves and Danny appears, startling Glenda. Glenda shows Danny his father's obituary and gives him the address of The Queen Victoria public house where Ronnie and Roxy live. In April, Danny and Glenda plan to con Roxy out of at least £1 million.

Glenda arrives at The Queen Vic and states she has been evicted from her flat. She tells Danny that unless he persuades Roxy into letting her stay she will reveal their plan. After Roxy tries to evict her, she reveals bruises on her arm and says that Danny has been hitting her. Glenda tells Ronnie and Roxy that Danny is not Archie's son. They ask Danny to leave. Glenda offers Danny a key to her flat, revealing her eviction was a lie. Glenda decides to leave but Roxy and Ronnie want her to stay. Peggy tells Roxy that Glenda insulted Archie in front of Roxy's young daughter Amy (Amelie Conway), so Roxy throws Glenda out. Glenda attempts to befriend Peggy's son Phil Mitchell (Steve McFadden), but he is not interested. The next day, Glenda convinces Roxy and Ronnie to talk, and Roxy believes Ronnie about the rape, and the girls reconcile. The next day, Glenda moves in with Roxy and Amy, who has decided to move out of The Queen Vic because of Peggy's refusal to believe Ronnie. At the reopening of the R&R nightclub, Glenda and Peggy argue about Ronnie and Roxy, and Peggy says Glenda could have taken her daughters with her when she left Archie, and Glenda says it was too late as Archie had replaced her, revealing that she knew Archie was sexually abusing Ronnie.

Glenda returns on the night of the fire at The Queen Vic (see Queen Vic Fire Week) to comfort her daughters. When Peggy leaves Walford, she tells Ronnie to give Glenda another chance, and invites Glenda to her wedding. Glenda flirts with the much younger Leon Small (Sam Attwater) in the betting shop and they arrange to meet later, leading to them having sex. Roxy is unable to pay for Ronnie and Jack's wedding as someone stole Roxy's cash, so Glenda distracts the manager of the hotel where they are marrying, allowing them to marry without paying. She discovers that Phil and his partner Shirley Carter (Linda Henry) stole Roxy's money, so attempts to blackmail him by suggesting an affair. She then invites Ian Beale (Adam Woodyatt) back to her flat, and they kiss. Glenda tells Ian to wait for her while she buys wine, and is almost hit by Phil's car. She then has sex with Phil, while Ian continues to wait for her back in her flat. While at Ben Mitchell's (Joshua Pascoe) welcome home party, Glenda insults several people including Phil, Ronnie, Ian, Shirley and Ben before leaving early. Back at her flat, she hears a noise and goes to investigate, but is pushed down the stairs. When Ian's son Peter Beale (Thomas Law) discovers their affair, he confronts Glenda and warns her to keep away from Ian. This makes her believe that Peter was the person who pushed her down the stairs. However, she soon realises it was Ben and reports him to the police. However, Phil discovers Glenda's affair with Ian and blackmails him into giving Ben an alibi, and Phil forces Glenda to withdraw her complaint and their relationship ends.

Glenda helps Roxy get her money back by breaking into Phil's safe, but he catches them when Glenda decides she wants to take extra. Phil then dupes Roxy that Glenda stole the money, and Roxy finds cash in Glenda's wardrobe. Roxy refuses to believe Glenda when she says Phil planted it and accuses Glenda of only wanting Roxy for her wealth. To get Roxy to believe that Phil would set her up, Glenda reveals her affair with Phil to Roxy in front of Phil and Shirley. Nobody believes Glenda, and Roxy ejects Glenda from her flat. Ronnie wants nothing to do with Glenda until she threatens to tell Jack that she has been lying about missing her counselling sessions, so Ronnie allows Glenda to stay with her. When Ronnie fears that Glenda is getting close to discovering she swapped her deceased baby James Branning with Tommy Moon, Ronnie tells Jack about missing the counselling sessions and throws Glenda out. Glenda visits Ian's wife Jane Beale (Laurie Brett) to tell Jane about the affair but Jane already knows. Shirley, who has learned of the affair from Ben, arrives and physically threatens Glenda, but decides against hurting her further. Glenda leaves Walford after the confrontation, but not before reducing Shirley to tears by reminding her that she always goes back to Phil regardless of his behaviour.

=== 2016–2017 ===
Glenda returns to help Roxy after her attempted rape by her fiancé Dean Wicks (Matt Di Angelo). After helping Roxy pack up her belongings, she visits Ronnie and Jack, and with a reluctant Ronnie, tries to talk Roxy out of moving to Portugal. They fail, and Roxy walks out on them both. Glenda encounters Claudette Hubbard (Ellen Thomas), and when Ronnie tells her Claudette's story that Phil's father Eric Mitchell murdered Claudette's husband, Glenda claims that Claudette must be lying. Glenda leaves after a phone call from Danny. She returns in May, looking for Roxy, as she has borrowed £3,000 from her and Danny before disappearing. Glenda and Ronnie visit Roxy in hospital, as she has been beaten up, but find she has discharged herself. When she does return, Roxy reveals she needs money to escape drug lords, which Ronnie pays her. Glenda admits to Roxy she would not have returned if Roxy had not taken her money, leading Roxy to offer her £5,000, on the condition she does not return. Glenda takes the money and leaves, to Ronnie's disappointment, though Ronnie does not know Roxy has paid her.

Glenda returns seven months later with Danny after Roxy calls asking for help because of her cocaine habit. The next day, they take Roxy home to pack her things, but Ronnie asks Roxy to give her away at her wedding and invites Glenda and Danny to attend. Glenda tells Ronnie that she loves her. After the wedding, Ronnie and Roxy both drown in the hotel swimming pool. Glenda is informed of this by the police and she identifies their bodies, causing her to break down in tears with Danny, Jack and his brother Max Branning (Jake Wood). Glenda's presence at Jack's house causes tension when she watches Jack and Ronnie's wedding DVD, upsetting Jack as the children could have also seen it. After Ronnie and Roxy's funerals, Glenda tells Jack that she intends to take custody of Matthew as a replacement for not being in her daughters' lives. Danny uses this opportunity to attempt to extort £20,000 from Jack, saying he can get Glenda to change her mind; Glenda slaps him and she tells Jack that her motive is not for financial gain. Convinced that she is telling the truth, he asks Glenda to move in to help him look after the children when he decides to remain in Walford, and she delightfully accepts. Glenda tells Jack that Amy has been wetting the bed, so Jack allows Amy to sleep in his bed. He later feels uncomfortable when Glenda kisses him on the cheek. He and Max go to the inquest and Ronnie and Roxy's deaths are ruled as a misadventure. However, Jack still blames Roxy. Later, Jack is furious when he finds out that Glenda has allowed Amy to get her ears pierced and throws Glenda out. He later realises that Glenda's intentions were good, and he tells her she can be a part of Amy, Matthew and Ricky's lives. Glenda tells Max she knows what he is up to before leaving Walford. Months later, Jack takes the children to visit Glenda to escape facing Charlie Cotton (Declan Bennett) who has returned to Walford.

== Reception ==
In January 2011, Inside Soap branded Glenda as "Walford's cougar". They also assumed she would be a "mousey lady who couldn't stand up to her husband" because of the past references to her in the serial, but of her actual persona they stated: "Age hasn't mellowed Glenda! She's a man-eater whose standards are so low that she's bedding Phil and Ian!" In March 2011, Glenda was nominated for "Villain of the Year" at the 2011 British Soap Awards. 8.6 million people watched Glenda's 2011 departure episode according to overnight ratings.

== See also ==
- List of soap opera villains
