= Christian Clarke =

Fictional character from EastEnders

- EastEnders character
- Portrayed by: John Partridge
- Duration: 2008–2012, 2014–2016
- First appearance: Episode 3510; 17 January 2008
- Last appearance: Episode 5293; 30 May 2016
- Created by: Dominic Treadwell-Collins
- Introduced by: Diederick Santer (2008); Dominic Treadwell-Collins (2014)
- Crossover appearances: East Street (2010)
In-universe information
- Occupation: Caterer; Barman; Personal trainer
- Father: Roger Clarke
- Mother: Linda Clarke
- Sisters: Jane Beale
- Husband: Syed Masood (2012–present)
- Stepdaughters: Yasmin Masood
- Nephews: Bobby Beale (adoptive)

Christian Clarke is a fictional character from the BBC soap opera EastEnders, portrayed by John Partridge. He first appeared in the show's 3,509th episode, originally broadcast in the United Kingdom on 17 January 2008, and was introduced as the brother of established character Jane Beale (Laurie Brett). He was introduced as a new gay character for the show, following the popularity of Coronation Street's Sean Tully (Antony Cotton). Christian and Partridge's casting were announced on 20 November 2007.

Christian's storylines have mostly revolved around his relationship with Syed Masood (Marc Elliott), but his other storylines have included a friendship with Roxy Mitchell (Rita Simons) and being involved in the coming out storylines of Ben Mitchell (Joshua Pascoe). On 17 September 2012, it was announced that Partridge would be leaving his role, following Elliott's decision to leave the show. They left together in the 4,532nd episode, originally broadcast on 15 November 2012.

Partridge returned to the show for two episodes on 19 and 20 May 2014 which saw Christian attend the funeral of Lucy Beale (Hetti Bywater). In January 2015, it was confirmed that Partridge would be returning for the show's 30th anniversary celebrations in February 2015. Partridge appeared in four episodes between 17 and 20 February 2015, including a fully live episode, which saw Christian attend Jane's wedding to Ian Beale (Adam Woodyatt). On 8 April 2016, it was reported that Partridge would reprise the role again in "early summer" 2016. Christian returned on 26 May 2016 and departed again on 30 May.

== Creation ==
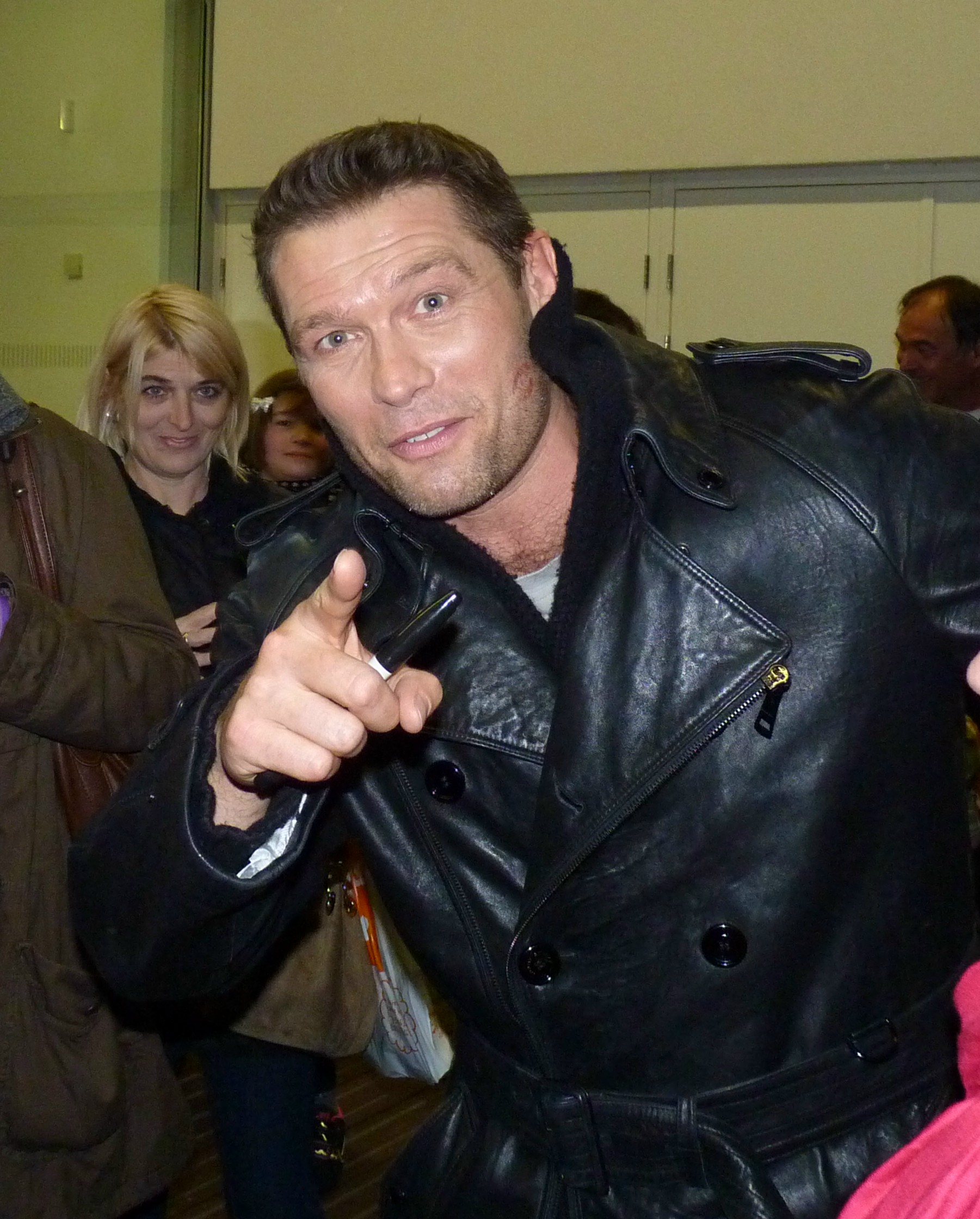
John Partridge (pictured) played Christian.

In November 2007, it was announced that a new gay character was to join the cast of EastEnders, as the show's bosses had seen how popular Antony Cotton was in the role of Sean Tully in rival soap opera Coronation Street. However, Partridge's character is not as camp as Cotton's, and is described as "very suave and a real charmer" and a "savvy, bright character [who is] very fun." Partridge commented that it would be "stupid" to copy Cotton's character, adding that "it's about time EastEnders had a gay character in the show." He later told Attitude that Cotton's character in Coronation Street is the reason Christian is in EastEnders due to his popularity, and that Christian was created to be the opposite of Sean. Partridge said of his character, "I think he's going to upset the apple cart at the Beales'" and "Christian, like me, is an openly proud gay man and he is certainly going to ruffle a few feathers when he arrives."

Christian 'kiss-my-guns' Clarke has the biceps of a god, and an innate inability to live a quiet life. It’s no surprise that he's Roxy Mitchell’s best mate, then. His put-downs are legendary, but Christian's brash exterior is very much that. The Christian that his friends and family know is sensitive, generous and fiercely loyal. If you're feeling down, he'll take you out for the best night of your life and provide a shoulder to cry on in the taxi home.

— A short description of Christian Clarke from the BBC (2012)

Talking about his casting in the role of Christian, Partridge has disclosed: "I'm slightly terrified when I come into work every day. It's an enormous machine. Plus, the actors I work with the most, Adam Woodyatt (Ian) and Laurie Brett (Jane), are such consummate professionals that I don't want to weaken the Beale family or bring anyone down. I want to stand up there with them and be seen as a good team player."

== Development ==
Partridge has commented that one aspect of his character he most enjoys is "that he weaves in and out of lots of characters' stories, so I have interaction with loads of different people. Take his friendship with Roxy, for example — I absolutely love it, and working with Rita Simons, who plays her, is such a pleasure. We're very natural in that set-up." In turn, Simons has commented that her own character, Roxy, would be "really lost without (Christian). He's her rock". Partridge has also denied that Christian is a stereotypical gay man, saying "Christian wears slightly brighter colours than I would normally wear but you know it is a BBC show and we have to show that I am gay you know? I don't think it's stereotypical at all because there are what I call seven shades of gay and that goes from real straight acting to camp and I like to think that Christian has all of those elements as I do as a gay man."

In June 2009, Christian begins an affair with Muslim character Syed Masood, played by Marc Elliott. The storyline is said to be controversial, as homosexuality is strictly forbidden according to mainstream interpretations of Islam. However, the show's executive producer Diederick Santer explained that the storyline will not be a moral tale, but one of human interest, adding: "[Syed] struggles with his sexuality when he finds himself drawn to Christian and he believes this goes against his faith. This is not a story about Syed and Christian's physical relationship — we don't see anything beyond one kiss." Santer also said that EastEnders always tries to "reflect modern life in multicultural Britain and [tell] social issue stories relevant to [its] diverse audience." Partridge commented on the storyline, saying: "I'm thrilled this storyline is being done. People fall in love in impossible circumstances all the time. Why are Christian and Syed any different?"

Partridge told entertainment website Digital Spy that lessons were learnt after a kiss between Christian and his then-boyfriend Lee Thompson in 2008 prompted 145 complaints from viewers, saying: "Even after [the gay kiss] story, Diederick [Santer, executive producer], Dominic Treadwell-Collins, series story producer] and the BBC were brave enough to push forward with this current storyline. Everybody learned lessons from that [gay kiss] as to how to tell this story... so as not to offend people, not to be gratuitous and not to let something like a kiss be something that overshadows the story we're trying to tell. I'm immensely proud of that and immensely proud of this storyline. I'm honoured that they've allowed me to be a face for it."

In December 2009, Santer was asked what his favourite storyline of the year had been. He replied "I'm really pleased with the Christian/Syed storyline. It's bold and we thought long and hard before we did it to make sure we got it right and I'm really proud with what we've done. Marc [Elliott] and John [Partridge] have absolutely stepped up to the plate and like all good EastEnders stories, we're not even half done with it yet. There's miles to go."

In 2010, Christian will get a beating once his and Syed's secret is revealed. A source explained: "It seems that Christian is going to take the brunt of Syed's problems. Syed and Amira's wedding achieved one of the highest ratings of the year, so we're expecting viewers to again be gripped when this storyline reaches its dramatic climax. "There will be lots of twists and turns along the way. And sadly for poor Christian, he'll be the one who ends up taking a battering. There will also be lots of complaints." Tahir Shah from the Muslim Public Affairs Committee criticised the storyline as soon as it was reported for portraying Muslims in a negative light."EastEnders is known for its gritty and realistic storylines but we cannot condone such violence from a Muslim character," he explained. However, gay rights campaigner Peter Tatchell described the plot as "groundbreaking", adding: "No storyline in any drama will ever reflect the totality of the many diverse gay lifestyles and experiences. Full credit to the BBC for having a gay Muslim character. The lives of gay Muslims are very rarely in the media."

=== Departure (2012) ===
On 7 September 2012, it was announced that Syed and Christian would be departing in November 2012 in an explosive storyline that bosses did not reveal at the time. Executive producer, Lorraine Newman said: "Marc and John have been a fantastic part of the show and their characters have been a huge success. Their storylines have broken boundaries that have not been seen in a soap before and the love for them by the viewers can be seen in their 'Chryed' fans. When Marc announced he had decided to move on, we had a tough decision to make. After numerous conversations, which included John, it was decided that there is only one outcome for Syed and Christian. We wish them both all the best for the future." Syed and Christian left together on 15 November 2012.

=== Returns (2014–2016) ===
On 7 April 2014, it was announced that Christian would be returning in May 2014 for the funeral of Lucy Beale (Hetti Bywater), who was to be killed as part of a new storyline (see Who Killed Lucy Beale?). It was revealed on 11 May 2014 that Christian would return when Jane's ex-husband, Ian Beale (Adam Woodyatt) visited him "in search of Jane". Christian returned for two episodes on 19 and 20 May 2014. On 17 January 2015, it was announced that Partridge would be returning again, this time for the show's thirtieth anniversary which would see Christian return for Ian and Jane's wedding. Of his return, Partridge said, "I am honoured to be returning to EastEnders at this most exciting time to celebrate 30 years of the show, and more importantly to find out who killed Lucy!" The show's executive producer, Dominic Treadwell-Collins, joked that Jane could not get married without having her brother at the occasion and said that the EastEnders team were "thrilled to have him [Partridge] back" for the anniversary. Treadwell-Collins then promised that Partridge's "extensive theatre experience" would be utilised as he "is plunged into EastEnders' live week." Spoiler images released on 10 February 2015 teased Partridge's return to the show, revealing that Christian would surprise Jane by initially telling her that he is unable to attend the wedding, before revealing himself to her. Partridge later teased another return to the show, saying, "I can always be lured back!"

On 8 April 2016, it was announced that Partridge would be "briefly" returning for a third guest stint in "early summer" 2016, alongside Lynda Baron who plays his on-screen mother, Linda Clarke. Their return storyline was billed as "explosive" for the Beale family, "unmissable", and something that would see "change in the Beale family forever". Partridge was confirmed to be filming EastEnders as well as touring with the production of Chicago The Musical. Of his return, Partridge said, "I am thrilled to be able to return to EastEnders whilst touring the UK with Chicago. Christian is never far from my mind – I turn my back for five minutes and look what happens." Partridge returned to filming on 14 April 2016, filming scenes which he believed would air "around June". He described returning to filming as "wonderful" and compared to "putting on a nice, comfortable pair of shoes." He also praised the EastEnders team for being "very welcoming", adding that it "seemed so natural to be back" and felt like he had "never been away". Partridge confirmed that he would feature in a lot of scenes with Brett as Christian will return to "look after Jane Beale". He teased that his return may involve the 'Who Killed Lucy Beale?' storyline and would be part of a "big year" for the Beale family.

== Storylines ==
=== 2008–2012 ===
Christian is first mentioned when his older sister Jane Beale (Laurie Brett) receives an invitation to his civil ceremony with partner Ashley Jennings (Tony Boncza). Jane throws the invitation away but it is later found by Jane's husband Ian (Adam Woodyatt). Jane refuses to tell Ian why she does not want to go to the ceremony but Ian wants to meet Christian, and invites him and Ashley to dinner at Fargo's Restaurant. Christian reveals that he was once in love with Jane's first husband David Collins (Dan Milne). Ashley storms out of the restaurant and the couple end their relationship. Christian is tricked by Ian's daughter Lucy (Melissa Suffield) into letting her use his flat so she can spend some "quality time" with her boyfriend, Olly Greenwood (Bart Edwards). Christian walks in on them about to have sex and stops them. Ian punches Christian over what happened with Lucy and Olly, but when he catches Lucy attempting to leave with Olly, he insists she move in with Christian again.

Christian is surprised to see his mother Linda (Lynda Baron) after having lost contact with her for nearly 20 years. At first, Christian dislikes her because she still disapproves of his sexuality, but when Ian's son Peter (Thomas Law) tells him how he lost his mother Cindy (Michelle Collins), Christian makes amends with her. Roxy unexpectedly goes into premature labour, and Christian offers to help raise the baby, Amy, as her marriage to Sean Slater (Robert Kazinsky) has ended. However, Roxy leaves Christian heartbroken when she gets back with Sean. She later tells Christian that he is to be Amy's godfather. Roxy gives her daughter the middle name Christina, after Christian. Christian's colleague at Masala Queen, Syed Masood (Marc Elliott), argues with him over his sexuality, saying that homosexuality goes against his God's will, but then unexpectedly kisses and has sex with Christian. Syed tries to avoid Christian, although Christian wants to begin a relationship with him. Syed refuses him although they continue with their affair, Syed eventually denies that he is gay and proposes to his girlfriend Amira Shah (Preeya Kalidas). On the day of Syed and Amira's engagement party, Christian takes a man called Luke back to his flat, but Luke beats Christian up after revealing he is not gay and hates gay men cottaging in public places. Following this, Christian becomes agoraphobic, but Syed helps Christian return to a normal life. Christian's friend James Mackie (Paul Keating) turns up, and Syed sees them together and is jealous. After James admits that he has feelings for Christian, Syed tries to put him off. Christian finds out and tells Syed that he will be with him but he must break up with Amira, but Syed cannot go through with it, so Christian starts a relationship with James. However, one day Christian takes Syed down an alleyway and kisses him, not realising they have been seen. Christian then breaks off his romance with James and restarts his secret affair with Syed. Christian and Syed are photographed looking cosy in an alleyway. Syed is blackmailed and Christian discovers it is Lucy. Syed soon breaks off the affair, and Christian tells Syed he cannot help arrange his wedding any more.

On the wedding day, Syed admits to Christian that he is gay but cannot come out because he is not just gay, but a son, a brother and a Muslim. When he runs away, distressed, Syed's mother Zainab (Nina Wadia) sees and confronts Christian who tells her everything, but she does not believe him and attacks him verbally and physically. She then goes to the wedding and confronts Syed who eventually confesses, and she tells him to marry Amira. When Syed and Amira return from their honeymoon, Christian introduces a man called Leyton (Daniel Crowder) as his boyfriend to make Syed jealous, which works as Syed is clearly upset. However, after Syed and Amira consummate their marriage, Syed tells Christian that they are planning a baby, and says he and Christian can both move on as Christian has Leyton and Syed has Amira. However, Christian tells Syed he has broken up with Leyton and was only with him to make Syed jealous. At Syed's and Amira's flat, Christian and Syed argue, but are then seen kissing on floor of the flat by Syed's father, Masood (Nitin Ganatra). This leads to the exposure of their affair, and Syed comes out to his family and friends, and Amira leaves Walford. However Syed rejects Christian again. Amira's father Qadim Shah (Ramon Tikaram) and his associates track down Christian, wanting to know where Syed is. Christian says he does not know, so they beat him and leave him outside on the pavement. When Syed returns, he apologises to Christian but Christian calls him a coward, saying he never wants to see him again. Syed has therapy to attempt to cure his same-sex attraction, and he tells Christian he no longer feels anything for him. However, Syed soon admits to Christian that his therapy has not worked and he wants to admit his true feelings. Christian pushes him away, but the next day he accepts Syed when he says he chooses Christian and turns his back on his family. The pair then move in with each other. On New Year's Eve, Christian attends a party at The Queen Victoria public house, and shares a kiss with a man. Christian tells Syed, and Syed is angry, but later forgives him. They decide they would like a child and a drunken Roxy offers to be the surrogate mother. However, despite their attempt, she does not become pregnant. Syed and Christian decide to adopt, and Christian later proposes to Syed, and Syed agrees. They continue with their plans to adopt and Christian finds a new flat for them. However, Syed almost changes his mind and the couple split up until Syed realises that he does want children.

Christian starts working at the local boxing club, and whilst there, 15-year-old Ben Mitchell (Joshua Pascoe) confides to him that he is gay. Christian gives advice to the teenager, but Ben develops a crush on Christian, which he discourages. Amira returns to Walford with hers and Syed's baby, Yasmin. She promptly tells Syed that she wants him to be a part of their baby's life but bans Christian from seeing her. Syed starts to secretly see Amira and Yasmin, and Ben reports this to Christian. Christian confronts Syed and declares that Syed has to choose between him and the baby. However, he relents and gives Syed his blessing to see his child. However, Yusef Khan (Ace Bhatti) suggests to Christian that Yasmin may not be Syed's child, casting doubt in Christian's mind. Christian then asks Yusef to perform a secret paternity test on Yasmin. The results of the test state that Syed is not the father of Yasmin, and Christian reveals this to Syed and Amira. Syed is devastated, but Amira continues to claim that he is the father. Syed doubts Christian, believing that he may have falsified the test. However, it emerges that it was Yusef who falsified the paternity test. Christian feels hurt that Syed suspected him of lying, but he reluctantly agrees to let Amira and Yasmin stay with him and Syed as they have nowhere else to go. Christian is annoyed to discover that Syed is helping Amira get a home in Walford. When Christian and Ben watch a film together, they talk about Christian and Syed's relationship and Ben misreads the signals, and tries to kiss Christian. Christian is horrified and Ben runs out of the flat, seen by Zainab and Yusef. Ben later lies to Yusef that Christian touched him inappropriately, and Yusef takes Ben to tell his father, Phil Mitchell (Steve McFadden). Phil confronts Christian in the pub, and Christian punches Phil when he calls him a "nonce". Phil leaves but later turns up at Christian's flat, smashing it up and hitting Christian with a baseball bat. Ben is forced to tell the truth so Phil leaves. However, Christian is upset with Syed for not trusting him, and when Amira tells Christian that he will be judged by the community, Christian decides to break up with Syed and leave Walford. Christian returns to Albert Square to spend Christmas with Jane. When he sees Syed and Amira, he mocks them for behaving like a couple. Syed is determined to win Christian back and asks Amira for a divorce. Christian and Syed reunite, but Amira vows to stay around. Amira later teases Christian that he will never be invited to Masood family occasions, and he tells her that her business with Syed is a smokescreen and she really wants him back. However, Amira soon tires of Walford without a husband, and leaves her daughter Yasmin in the care of Syed and Christian.

During a Masood family crisis, Christian is asked to look after Zainab on her own, and they talk. She tells him about how she lied to Yusef so that he would be killed (Zainab told him that his daughter Afia (Meryl Fernandes) was trapped in a burning building). She wonders who will forgive her, and Christian tells her that he does. He explains that they never chose to be the people they are, and she asks if he loves Syed. He says that he does and she realises that when he said it before, she never really listened. They make amends and Zainab invites Christian to a family dinner and to the mosque. When Christian decides to enter Yasmin into a "beautiful baby" competition, Syed is angry, and refers to Yasmin as his daughter, not his and Christian's, leading to an argument between them. Before their wedding, Syed reveals to Christian that he kissed Danny Pennant (Gary Lucy), but Christian says it was just a kiss and they marry. However, Syed is in debt to Danny, who texts him. Christian sees the texts and meets Danny, who reveals that he had sex with Syed. Christian punches Danny and Syed then finds Christian badly beaten. Christian lies that he was the victim of a homophobic attack, and refuses to give Syed any details. Syed calls the police to report the assault. However, Christian is arrested for the assault on Danny. Danny tells Syed he will only retract his police statement if Syed returns £500 he owes. However, Masood threatens to tell the police about Danny's dodgy investments, so Danny withdraws the allegations. Christian asks Syed for his reassurance of their love and marriage or he will end their relationship. Syed cannot give it, so Christian moves out. Amira returns, wanting to take Yasmin to live with her and her new fiancé in Birmingham. Syed allows Amira to take her, not telling Christian, who is angry when he finds out. He plans to move to America to live with Jane. Syed discovers this through Masood, and brands Christian a hypocrite. Zainab and Lucy lock the pair in the Masoods' restaurant where they reunite. Refusing to leave without Syed, Christian has Jane book them both tickets and they leave together to go to America, planning to live closer to Amira and Yasmin once they return to the UK.

=== 2014–2016 ===
In May 2014, Ian visits Christian at his home in Birmingham following Lucy's (now Hetti Bywater) death (see "Who Killed Lucy Beale?"), where Jane is also staying. Christian comforts Ian and expresses his condolences. Ian asks after his son Bobby (Rory Stroud/Eliot Carrington), who is also staying with them and meets Yasmin, who Christian is babysitting whilst Syed is at work. Christian promises to attend the funeral and after Ian has left, Jane returns home and tells Christian that she will not be attending the funeral. Christian is disappointed by her behaviour. The following day, Christian returns to Walford with Bobby to attend the funeral, travelling in the family car to the church with Ian, Peter and Bobby. Following the service, Christian catches up with Roxy and asks after Amy. He then returns to Birmingham with Jane and Bobby. In February 2015, Christian returns for Jane and Ian's wedding. He calls Jane pretending that he has to work, but he arrives in the salon where Jane is getting ready moments later to surprise her.

In May 2016, Christian returns alongside Linda after Jane is attacked by Bobby with a hockey stick. While Jane is comatose, Ian tells Christian that Bobby killed Lucy and Jane covered it up. The next day, Linda reveals that Christian has gone back to Birmingham.

== Reception ==
The character's introduction to EastEnders was welcomed by critics, with the Pink News deeming him to be "a realistic portrayal of a London-based, slightly older gay man." Gareth McLean of The Guardian praised the character, saying "he brings EastEnders a step closer to more accurately resembling London."

In October 2008, a kiss between Christian and new love interest Lee prompted 145 complaints from viewers who were displeased that homosexual kissing had been broadcast before the 9pm watershed. The BBC released a statement defending the incident, stating: "EastEnders aims to reflect real life, and this means including and telling stories about characters from many different backgrounds, faiths, religions and sexualities. We approach our portrayal of homosexual relationships in the same way as we do heterosexual relationships. In this instance, Christian is enjoying the first flush of romance and we've shown him being affectionate with his new boyfriend in the same way any couple would. We also aim to ensure that depictions of affection or sexuality between couples are suitable for pre-watershed viewing. We believe that the general tone and content of EastEnders is now widely recognised, meaning that parents can make an informed decision as to whether they want their children to watch."
