= Syed Masood =

Fictional character from EastEnders

- EastEnders character
- Portrayed by: Marc Elliott
- Duration: 2009–2012
- First appearance: Episode 3775; 21 April 2009
- Last appearance: Episode 4532; 15 November 2012
- Introduced by: Diederick Santer
In-universe information
- Occupation: Property developer; Caterer; Massage therapist; Market stall holder
- Father: Masood Ahmed
- Mother: Zainab Masood
- Stepfather: Yusef Khan
- Brothers: Tamwar Masood; Kamil Masood
- Sisters: Shabnam Masood
- Spouse: Amira Shah (2010–2012); Christian Clarke (2012–present)
- Daughters: Yasmin Masood
- Uncles: Inzamam Ahmed; AJ Ahmed
- Nieces: Jade Masood
- First cousins: Jamila Inzamam; Ali Inzamam

Syed Masood is a fictional character from the BBC soap opera EastEnders, played by Marc Elliott, and first appeared on screen on 21 April 2009. Syed is a British Pakistani and is the eldest son of Masood Ahmed (Nitin Ganatra) and Zainab Masood (Nina Wadia), and older brother of Tamwar (Himesh Patel), Shabnam (Zahra Ahmadi) and Kamil Masood (Arian Chikhlia). Syed's storylines see him fall in love with Christian Clarke (John Partridge), and his eventual acceptance that he is gay. Syed initially marries Amira Shah (Preeya Kalidas) but later comes out, and enters a relationship with Christian, despite the pressures of his family and his Muslim faith. In September 2012, it was announced that Elliott would be leaving EastEnders alongside John Partridge. He departed on 15 November 2012.

== Creation ==
Syed had been mentioned regularly since the Masoods arrived in Walford in 2007, but was not introduced on-screen until April 2009. In 2009, it was announced actor Marc Elliott would be joining the EastEnders cast. In an interview with Digital Spy, Elliott described his arrival: "It is so exciting to join the cast of EastEnders and to be working with actors such as Nina Wadia [Zainab] and Nitin Ganatra [Masood] who I have admired for many years. The Masood family have really made a name for themselves in the Square and it will be interesting see how Syed plans to stir things up!" Elliott was cast in the role after a successful reading with Ganatra and Wadia. Eliott was told he had been successfully cast just before Christmas 2008.

In an interview with entertainment and media website Digital Spy, Elliott commented on his casting, and the "responsibility" with regard to playing a character that viewers already had preconceived images about: "I hope I'm what everyone expects! I was given a biography when I got the part [...]. It's a process all characters go through to decide what they'd do in certain situations, given certain choices and basic things, for example who they'd like or dislike on [Albert] Square. That helped to cement the character in my head [...]. He's such a complex character. It's such a collaborative experience. I'm discovering things about Syed at the same time as the rest of the team." To prepare for the role, Elliott watched documentaries such as A Jihad for Love which focus on the ways in which gay Muslims reconcile their faith with their sexuality.

=== Characterisation ===
Elliott's character is apparently a smooth-talking natural charmer who knows how to get ahead in business. He is also described as "handsome, suave and sophisticated". Executive Producer Diederick Santer described Syed as "Entrepreneurial, reckless, dashing and complicated, [he's] set to bring surprises and chaos to the Masood family." Elliott revealed that the character is driven by money: "It's all about the cash. His drive is to be successful and there's nothing really Machiavellian about him – well, there potentially is – but he just wants the money because he believes he can use it to make more. [Syed]'s very cocksure and confident about himself but the absurd thing is that he hasn't learned from his past mistakes." He also says that "Syed manipulates people to his own ends. He's charming, confident and reckless." Wadia described the character as a "dark horse", saying, "What I like about the way they've introduced him is that you get to see the gentle side of him first – the repentant side. Then you see what he's really like over the subsequent weeks."

== Development ==
Shortly after his arrival, Syed's girlfriend, Amira Shah, was introduced played by Preeya Kalidas. Elliott has described the relationship between the characters and Syed's motivation: "Well, she's a rich daddy's girl and it's hard not to make the association between Syed and money. There's certainly an honest attraction there and I think he does love her. But the money that her father has might be an additional aspect of their relationship. Amira comes in and ruffles a few feathers, especially Zainab's. Obviously with Syed being a mummy's boy, she has to have her say. I don't think Zainab would be happy with anyone that Syed's with – they'd have to be absolutely perfect. Mummy Masood will be doing a lot of meddling and locking horns with Amira."

In June 2009, Syed begins an affair with gay character Christian Clarke, played by John Partridge, a storyline that will see Syed "torn between his feelings and [his] faith". The storyline is said to be controversial, as homosexuality is strictly forbidden in Islam. However, Santer explained that the storyline will not be a moral tale, but one of human interest, adding: "In this regard, it's not dissimilar to the story we told when Dot Cotton's deeply-held Christian beliefs came into conflict with her desire to alleviate Ethel's suffering [in a euthanasia plotline]. To all intents and purposes, Syed is a 'good' Muslim man: he doesn't drink, smoke or engage in sex before marriage. But he struggles with his sexuality when he finds himself drawn to Christian and he believes this goes against his faith. This is not a story about Syed and Christian's physical relationship – we don't see anything beyond one kiss. It's more about the inner turmoil and conflict Syed endures trying to remain true to his faith while questioning his sexuality. Syed has already been ostracised from his family and community once and if he's true to his heart he risks losing his family again." Santer also said that EastEnders always tries to "reflect modern life in multicultural Britain and [tell] social issue stories relevant to [its] diverse audience." Elliott commented on the storyline, saying: "I think EastEnders would be doing the programme a disservice if they didn't give a voice to various communities. I think that's really important because I think London is a very ethnically diverse multicultural place, and EastEnders has a job to reflect that in the story lines it gives people and the characters they have on board." This plot was researched with help from academics, gay Muslim support groups and members of the Muslim Council of Great Britain, and will contain a "balance of opinions" from various other characters, including Syed's mother Zainab.

When asked in a BBC interview in September 2009 if Syed is gay or bisexual, Elliott answered: "I think at this stage there's confusion about his sexuality. He knows he likes Christian but it hasn't really been stipulated. He wants to settle down and have children with Amira because that's what's expected of him, but he finds himself unavoidably attracted to Christian so that's what's going on in his head." He went on to say that Syed is still attracted to Amira but only because "that's what he’s meant to do", adding that "he's probably conning himself." Christian's friend James Mackie, played by Paul Keating arrives and when Syed refuses to break up with Amira, Christian starts a relationship with James to forget Syed. Elliott says that this is the moment when Syed realises his feelings for Christian go beyond sexual attraction. Elliot explains that Syed and Amira have never been intimate, in theory because of their religion, but adds that Syed is probably scared to get intimate with her and is merely hiding behind his religion.

In December 2009, Santer was asked what his favourite story line of the year had been. He replied "I'm really pleased with the Christian/Syed story line. It's bold and we thought long and hard before we did it to make sure we got it right and I'm really proud with what we've done. Marc [Elliott] and John [Partridge] have absolutely stepped up to the plate and like all good EastEnders stories, we're not even half done with it yet. There's miles to go."

Syed and Amira's wedding takes place on screen on 1 January 2010. They have a traditional Pakistani wedding featuring horses, drummers and dancers. Scriptwriters researched by watching videos of a real British Pakistani wedding. BBC Asian Network reporter Shabnam Mahmood also advised on the wedding. The wedding and its build-up were filmed over a two-week period and Elliott required three two-hour riding lessons before he could film the horseback scenes. He revealed: "I was quite proud of myself, though, as I managed to canter although I don't do that around the Square as it's not that big. During rehearsals the horse, Storm, was really well behaved and it all went fairly smoothly. But as soon as it came to the actual filming and all the drums and banners came out, it wasn't so easy. I think she walks sideways for quite a bit of the time. But I'm just pleased that I didn't end up impaled on the railings in Albert Square. I think avoiding that was quite an achievement." John Partridge choreographed the dance scenes and Elliott took six weeks to learn the dance, saying: "I couldn't have done it without him [Partridge]. He had me practising in every spare moment, even in the hallways by myself as he wanted to see a marked improvement on my routine. Preeya kept getting occasional glimpses of me practising in the hallways and she didn't look too impressed with what she saw. Johnny did a great job with that routine, although I added in the back flip myself! By the end of it, I ate, slept and dreamt that dance."

Before the wedding, Syed's affair with Christian is revealed to his mother Zainab and he admits to her that he is gay. She urges him to go ahead with the wedding and only a small number of people know about Syed and Christian. Elliot said he was pleased that the affair came out this way, as "it's far more realistic this way". He added that the writers would have "done the story a disservice" if Syed and Christian had ended up with their 'happily ever after', saying "they need to show the life after the wedding and show how Syed will cope living with a wife who he loves, but not in the way he loves Christian. He has to live with the fact that he's not being true to himself over his sexuality." Elliott noted a change in Syed's personality, saying "Syed's starting to show signs of being quite a cruel character but it's only through his own bitterness and resentment that he starts acting the way he does – it's the way he deals with it. Poor Amira's none the wiser, so Syed's not acting right and she has no idea why."

In 2011, a same-sex parenting storyline which sees Christian and Syed finding a surrogate mother was reported by the Daily Mirror. If true, it will form one of the year's biggest plots, expected to controversial and a ratings hit. In March 2011, it was reported that a Syed would be among characters sustaining injuries when the roof of his parents' restaurant, The Argee Bhajee, collapses. The scenes, to air in April 2011, were filmed in February, and a spokespoerson said "Despite the ill-feeling between him and his parents, Syed is in the building when the disastrous party takes place. But what the accident could mean for the family feud remains to be seen." The plot could see Syed and Christian share more screentime with the rest of the Masood family, as Partridge commented that the issues may start to be resolved, though not necessarily leading to the outcome viewers will want.

A scene showing Syed and Christian naked in bed together prompted over 100 complaints to the BBC. EastEnders executive producer Bryan Kirkwood was forced to defend the scenes. The mixed response from viewers to the scenes confirms the findings of a BBC survey last year, which showed that gay relationships are still a divisive issue. On the other hand, some other viewers praised the BBC for showing "the fabulous portrait of the relationship between Syed and Christian". The viewer said the gay bed scene was a "big step towards equality". The BBC stated in response The BBC's statement said: "EastEnders aims to reflect real life, and this means including and telling stories about characters from many different backgrounds, faiths, religions and sexualities".

=== Civil partnership ===
It was confirmed that newcomer Danny Pennant (Gary Lucy) would be romantically linked to Syed who is embroiled in a serious relationship with Christian Clarke (John Partridge). Elliott revealed Danny would return, saying: "He returns – he can't be punched in the face in the Argee Bhajee and leave without his dignity! He's got to come back and get some sort of revenge, and he does." Elliott also stated that Christian would get involved with the city banker, stating: "Christian becomes involved in a storyline with him, which involves the police and possibly arrests." Finally Elliott expressed his happiness on his parents accepting his relationship with Christian, explaining: "I think that's been really important. Obviously there's been a three and a half-year build to them getting married, and I think there has been a huge shift. But then I think when we started the story, we were surprised by how accepting the audience was and how ready they were to see something like that. It's been brilliant."

=== Departure ===
On 7 September 2012, it was announced that Syed and Christian would be departing in November 2012 in an explosive storyline that bosses did not reveal at the time. Executive producer Lorraine Newman said: "Marc and John have been a fantastic part of the show and their characters have been a huge success. Their storylines have broken boundaries that have not been seen in a soap before and the love for them by the viewers can be seen in their 'Chryed' fans. When Marc announced he had decided to move on, we had a tough decision to make. After numerous conversations, which included John, it was decided that there is only one outcome for Syed and Christian. We wish them both all the best for the future."

== Storylines ==
=== Backstory ===
Syed is a British Pakistani and is the eldest son of Masood Ahmed (Nitin Ganatra) and Zainab Masood (Nina Wadia), and brother of Tamwar (Himesh Patel) and Shabnam (Zahra Ahmadi). Prior to the Masoods' arrival in Walford, Syed was estranged from his family for four years. He stole from the family business, almost bankrupting them. His father took the blame, but exiled Syed from the family. Syed moved to the north of England and worked in the property industry.

=== 2009–2012 ===
Syed resumes contact with his family when he experiences financial difficulties. Although Masood reveals his previous theft, Zainab forgives her son, and invites him to move into the family home when he is evicted for failing to pay his rent. Syed introduces his family to his girlfriend, Amira Shah (Preeya Kalidas), who soon moves to Walford to be near him. He begins working for his parents' catering company, and develops an attraction to his colleague, Christian Clarke (John Partridge). The two have sex, and Syed admits that he has had one-night stands with men before. Conflicted by his Muslim faith, Syed proposes to Amira. He continues to see Christian, whose niece Lucy Beale (Melissa Suffield) sees them kissing and blackmails him. Christian and Syed declare their love for one another, but when Masood is involved in a car accident, Syed believes he is being punished and terminates their relationship. A hurt Christian tries to move away from Walford, but is unable to forget about Syed, and returns in an attempt to deter him from marriage. On his wedding day, Syed admits to Christian that he is gay and in love with him, but feels unable to come out because of his family and faith. Zainab discovers the truth, but implores Syed to go through with his marriage. He does so, but is initially unable to consummate it. He tells his mother that the thought of sex with Amira makes him feel physically sick. He wishes to confess his sexuality, but Zainab warns him against shaming the family and threatens to disown him. Syed attempts to commit to his marriage; he has sex with Amira, and suggests starting a family.

Despite his intentions, Syed resumes his relationship with Christian. Amira becomes pregnant but it was her misunderstanding and not real (but finally she will at the time she leaves, although she will not tell it to Syed). Syed intends to continue the affair, to Christian's displeasure. Syed accidentally ends up revealing to Amira that he is gay. Amira's father Qadim Shah (Ramon Tikaram) becomes very mad at him. Amira terminates their relationship and leaves Walford. Christian is attacked by Qadim, and rejects Syed when he visits him. He calls him a coward for trying to appease his family. Syed is later told to find a new mosque to attend, and implored to leave Walford by Christian's best friend Roxy Mitchell (Rita Simons). He takes an overdose, and regains consciousness to hear Zainab telling him it would be better if he was dead. She burns his belongings and attempts to evict him from the family home, but is stopped by Masood. Syed begins attending therapy which he believes will cure him of his homosexuality, though it proves unsuccessful. Syed knows Christian still has feelings for him, but when he visits Christian, he rejects Syed again. The following day, Syed tells Christian he chooses him and needs his help, and that he is both gay and Muslim. The two move in together, and Syed is disowned by his parents.

Syed becomes Christian's personal assistant and finds a new mosque. His parents help him escape from a fire, but they return to ignoring him in the aftermath. Trying to move on with his life, Syed starts his own massage business. He discovers that his father almost had an affair, and threatens to tell his mother, but decides against it. He is hurt when Christian kisses another man at a party, but is able to forgive him. They decide to have a child, although Syed is at first against the idea. A drunken Roxy offers to be the surrogate mother and although Syed tells Christian that it is happening too quickly, Roxy has already impregnated herself with Christian's sperm. The insemination is unsuccessful however. Syed rents a room at Roxy's salon for his massage therapy business, but steals her client list and plans to go into business with Roxy's manager, Tanya Branning (Jo Joyner). He and Christian attend Tamwar's engagement party together, much to the disgust of his parents. The roof of their restaurant collapses and knocks Syed unconscious, Christian and Yusef Khan (Ace Bhatti) come to his aid. Zainab is led to believe his condition is critical and visits him in hospital, but rejects him once he is discharged. Zainab visits Syed after being urged to by Yusef, but she leaves after a while admitting it was a mistake. However, when Masood lets Zainab down, she contacts Syed and they meet in a café. Masood discovers them but Syed says he cannot stop them seeing each other. Syed confronts Zainab and Masood in The Queen Victoria, telling them that if they do not accept Christian as Syed's lover then there is nothing more to say. Syed calls Masood a hypocrite for gambling and tells Zainab that they are in no position to judge him. He then tells them to live their lives and he will live his. Eventually, Syed and Zainab make amends. Christian and Syed try to pursue an adoption and Christian finds a new flat for them. However, Syed almost changes his mind and the couple split up until Syed realises that he does want a child. Syed tells his family he and Christian are engaged at a family meal, but they do not take the news well.

Syed decides to find Amira so he can get a divorce, but has trouble finding her and Christian worries about Qadim getting involved in their lives again. It is revealed Amira is practically being held hostage by her father and that she had Syed's baby, a girl called Yasmin. Eventually Amira comes to Walford and wants Syed to be part of Yasmin's life as long as Christian is not part of it. Syed and Christian agree that their relationship comes first and they will go through the courts to gain access. However, when Christian is asleep, Syed sneaks out to meet Yasmin. Syed continues to secretly see Yasmin and Amira, but when Christian learns of this, he confronts Syed and declares that Syed has to choose between him and the baby. However, he relents and gives Syed his blessing to see his child. Once Zainab knows about Yasmin, she and Amira both try to manipulate Syed into spending more time with his daughter, at the expense of Christian. Christian reveals that he had a paternity test performed, which proves that Syed is not the father of Yasmin. Syed is devastated, but Amira continues to claim that he is the father. It later emerges that it was Yusef who falsified the paternity test. Syed and Christian then let Amira and Yasmin stay with them, as they have nowhere else to go. When Christian is falsely accused of touching 15-year-old Ben Mitchell (Joshua Pascoe), Syed and Christian argue, which leads to Christian breaking up with Syed and leaving Walford. Amira tells Syed that she has a business opportunity in Pakistan, and invites Syed to join her and Yasmin there. Syed is initially reluctant, but after Christian's sister Jane Beale (Laurie Brett) says that Christian is unlikely to reunite with him, Syed considers the move. Christian returns to Walford at Christmas, and when he sees Syed and Amira, he mocks them for behaving like a couple. However, Syed is determined to win Christian back and insists on a divorce, though Amira refuses, so he brings Qadim back to convince her. Christian and Syed then reunite, and Amira agrees to a divorce, but tells Syed that she will not leave Walford with Qadim. Amira then starts a brief relationship with Anthony Moon (Matt Lapinskas), and Syed and Amira start their business. However, Amira soon tires of Walford without a husband, and leaves her daughter Yasmin in the care of Syed and Christian. Syed is relieved when Christian finally reconciles with the Masood family, and Zainab invites Christian to a family dinner and to the mosque.

Syed's business ventures fail and he is in debt to a supplier. When Zainab puts Syed in charge of Tamwar's restaurant, he forges Tamwar's signature on a cheque to pay off his debt, but leaves the restaurant in debt with the mortgage unpaid. Syed meets Danny Pennant (Gary Lucy), and they are attracted to each other. Syed invests money with Danny and borrows £500 back, but eventually the investment falls through, and Zainab also lends Syed money, taken from Kamil and Tamwar's trust funds. Syed and Danny kiss, but Syed regrets it and goes on to marry Christian in a civil ceremony after confessing the kiss. However, after the wedding, which takes place in the restaurant, bailiffs arrive as four months' mortgage is overdue. Syed tries to leave but eventually decides to stay, revealing that the debt is his fault and the money taken from the accounts was for him. Christian stays with him, saying they can sort the debts together. Syed is, however, under pressure from Danny to return the £500. Christian sees texts from Danny on Syed's phone and meets Danny, and Danny tells Christian he had sex with Syed. Christian punches Danny. Syed later sees Christian covered in blood and bruises. Christian lies that it was a homophobic attack, and Syed calls the police without Christian's knowledge. However, Christian is arrested for the assault on Danny. Danny tells Syed he will only retract his police statement if Syed returns £500 he owes. However, Masood threatens to tell the police about Danny's dodgy investments, so Danny withdraws the allegations. Christian asks Syed for his reassurance of their love and marriage or he will end their relationship. Syed cannot give it, so Christian moves out. Amira returns, wanting to take Yasmin to live with her and her new fiancé in Birmingham. Syed allows Amira to take her, not telling Christian, who is angry when he finds out. Christian plans to move to America to live with Jane. Syed discovers this through Masood, and brands Christian a hypocrite. Zainab and Lucy lock the pair in the Masoods' restaurant where they reunite. Refusing to leave without Syed, Christian has Jane book them both tickets and they leave together to go to America, planning to live closer to Amira and Yasmin once they return to the UK.

== Reception ==
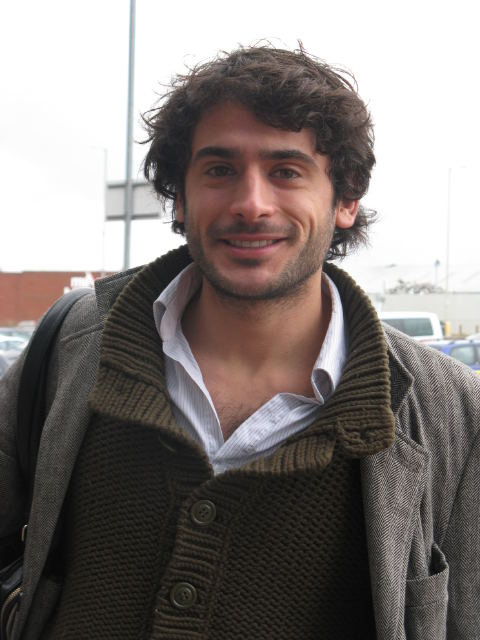
Marc Elliott (pictured) was praised by critics for his portrayed of Syed.

Critically, both Syed's gay storyline and Marc Elliott's acting were well received, with Elliott winning Best Newcomer at The British Soap Awards in 2010. From its inception, however, Syed's gay storyline was criticised by Asghar Bokhari of the Muslim Public Affairs Committee, who said "The Muslim community deserves a character that represents them to the wider public because Islamophobia is so great right now. There's a lack of understanding of Muslims already and I think EastEnders really lost an opportunity to present a normal friendly Muslim character to the British public." One British Muslim fan of EastEnders reportedly told the Al Arabiya news channel that the storyline "is not a true reflection of the majority of Muslims in the United Kingdom." Another British Muslim said "I think it's bad, it is going to give a bad impression about Islam. The type of people that watch EastEnders are going to be very naïve about such a portrayal of Muslims," but added that Muslims probably would not boycott the show as "generally practicing Muslims don't really watch EastEnders."

Diederick Santer responded to the criticisms of Muslim viewers by saying "It's really important that [...] we give the Masoods big stories. Sometimes there's a danger of being too careful with black or Asian characters that we might go into territories that might offend. But it seems to me if we steer away from any controversy, they don't stand a chance of being a great EastEnders family – they'll just be in their kitchen unit making curries for years and years and that's not going to be very interesting." Yusuf Wehebi from LGBT Muslim advocacy group Imaan said: "It is high time that the invisible minority became a visible minority. It is entirely possible to be Muslim and gay and there [are] many of us in Britain today. It is great that the BBC have had the courage to raise such an important social issue in our society today." The kiss between Syed and Christian was watched by 7.9 million viewers. Elliott told Soaplife magazine that he has received no negative feedback from the show's fans for the storyline.

The 1 January 2010 episode in which Syed marries Amira in a Pakistani wedding received overnight ratings of 11.64 million viewers, an average audience share of 39.3%. The ultimate five minutes of the episode, in which Christian and Syed share an emotional goodbye, received a peak of 12.34 million viewers. The wedding was criticised by a writer for Asian Image, who said "With so much resources at hand they couldn't even get a Muslim wedding right. It was colourful and noisy but the priest couldn't speak the lingo properly and the wedding vows were all wrong. What was the priest doing sat between the bride and groom? At least attempt to make it as realistic as possible. It was Indian and then Pakistani – what on earth was going on! For a prime-time show which was watched by millions at least try to get as close to a real Pakistani Muslim wedding as possible. The whole thing reminded me of one of 1960s botched jobs put together by some middle-aged white man who 'thought it happened this way so it must!'" A Channel Five retrospective on soap weddings in 2010, however, deemed the "dramatic Bollywood-style wedding" to be "spectacular".

In July 2010, viewers complained after Syed was seen dropping his Qu'ran in frustration. The BBC responded by saying "It was not intended to be a disrespectful act, rather a totally spontaneous one, symbolic of Syed's utter confusion and frustration at what feels like an impossible situation. It wasn't our intention to cause any offence." Additionally, Ofcom received 23 complaints from viewers who said the gay Muslim storyline was offensive to their faith. In the same month, the Syed-Christian storyline was commented on in Stonewall research, which found that positive and realistic gay characters appear in just 0.6% of broadcast television. Stonewall noted the romance storyline was a predominantly violent and unhappy one. Among readers of Inside Soap, Syed and Christian came second in a poll of characters favoured to marry on-screen in 2011.

In January 2011, Elliott was nominated for Serial Drama Performance at the 2011 National Television Awards for his portrayal of Syed. Inside Soap readers voted Syed their favourite member of the Masood family. Kate White from Inside Soap ran a feature on what Christmas presents she would give to soap characters. White said she would buy Syed a backbone in the hope he would stand up for himself, as his "lack of will power" drove Christian away. Following the storyline where Syed causes his family to lose their restaurant, Heat called him "clinically stupid".

=== Response from previous cast members ===
Syed, along with the rest of the Masood family, was criticised by actor Deepak Verma, who played Sanjay Kapoor between 1993 and 1998. He said that EastEnders had failed to portray Asian families in a realistic manner, branding the family "two-dimensional and ill-conceived". A BBC spokesperson responded by saying "It's a shame Deepak feels that way but that's clearly his personal opinion. The Masood family have proved to be hugely popular with EastEnders viewers." During Syed's gay storyline, actor Jimi Mistry, who played gay Asian character Fred Fonseca in EastEnders between 1998 and 2000, expressed surprise in October 2009 at another gay Asian storyline in the programme. Mistry said "It's amazing, isn't it? It was ten years ago when we did it and they're still going down that path. I can't really comment though. I did my stint and I did see they were going along that road again but it's their choice. They must think that people have forgotten the last time they did it, so maybe they're just redoing it in a different way."
