= Glynis Barber =

South African-British actress (born 1955)

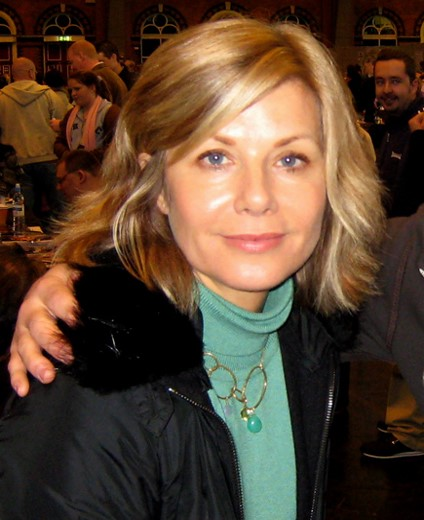
- Barber in 2007
- Born: Glynis van der Riet; 25 October 1955 (age 70); Durban, South Africa
- Education: Mountview Academy of Theatre Arts
- Occupation: Actress
- Years active: 1978–present
- Known for: Dempsey and Makepeace; EastEnders; Emmerdale; Night and Day; Blake's 7 Hollyoaks
- Spouse(s): Paul Antony-Barber (m. 1977; div. 1979) Michael Brandon (m. 1989)
- Children: 1
- Website: www.glynisbarber.com

Glynis Barber (born Glynis van der Riet; 25 October 1955) is a South African-British actress. She is known for her portrayals of Sgt. Harriet Makepeace in the British police drama Dempsey and Makepeace, Glenda Mitchell in EastEnders, DCI Grace Barraclough in Emmerdale, Norma Crow in Hollyoaks, Fiona Brake in Night and Day, and Soolin in Blake's 7.

== Early life ==
Barber was born in Durban, Union of South Africa, the daughter of Heather Maureen (née Robb) and Frederick Werndly Barry van der Riet.

== Acting career ==
=== Television ===
Barber studied at the Mountview Academy of Theatre Arts. Acting since 1978, securing small parts such as a secretary in 1980 in Bognor, her breakthrough came in 1981 with her role as Soolin in Series 4 of the BBC science fiction television series Blake's 7 although she had also played a different character in a Series 1 episode.

In 1982, she took the title role in the television series Jane playing a Second World War heroine. This series was filmed against a blue screen allowing for the addition of a cartoon background, an experimental technique in its day. However, Barber is best known for her mid-1980s role of Sgt. Harriet Makepeace in the police drama Dempsey and Makepeace, where she met her future husband, Michael Brandon.

Since 1987, Barber has appeared frequently in plays, films and television series. She also starred in the LWT drama series Night and Day as Fiona Brake. In 2006, she joined the cast of ITV soap, Emmerdale, playing the character of DCI Grace Barraclough, investigating the death of Tom King on Christmas Day. She exited the soap in September 2007, when her character was killed. In 2009, she appeared as hospital administrator Jean McAteer in The Royal, another ITV drama series set in Yorkshire. In the same year, she and Brandon both appeared in an episode of the BBC series New Tricks, entitled "The Truth Is Out There".

On 23 October 2009, it was announced she would play Glenda Mitchell the mother of Ronnie Mitchell, Roxy Mitchell and Danny Mitchell in EastEnders after Jill Gascoine withdrew from the role during her first day on set. On 27 February 2011, it was announced that Barber was to leave EastEnders in March 2011. In February 2015, Barber admitted that she would consider an EastEnders comeback. She commented: "I've always felt that Glenda left with a few unresolved issues. It would be fun to go back and create a little bit of havoc!". Glenda returned for two episodes on 1 January 2016. Barber returned to EastEnders full-time in January 2017 before leaving once again in February.

In September 2013, she appeared in the ITV dancing show Stepping Out with husband Michael Brandon. In August 2019, Barber narrated When Luxury Holidays Go Wrong on C5 and would later appear in the television series The Outpost. Since 2019, she has been narrating the Channel 5 series The Wonderful World of Chocolate. Then in 2022, she joined the cast of Channel 4 soap opera Hollyoaks as Norma Crow.

=== Theatre ===
Her stage work has included Macbeth, Killing Time with Dennis Waterman, High Flyers with Hugh Grant, Make Me a Match and The Graduate. In 2011, Barber starred alongside Christopher Timothy and Denis Lill in Alan Ayckbourn's Seasons Greetings, playing Belinda. In 2013, she played Melissa Gardner in Love Letters at Dundee Repertory Theatre along with Michael Brandon. Barber played Carole King's mother, Genie Klein, in the West End production of Beautiful – The Carole King Musical from its opening at the Aldwych Theatre on 24 February 2015 until 28 November 2015. In August 2025, she was cast in the 2025/26 UK and Ireland tour of Agatha Christie's Death on the Nile as Salome Otterbourne.

=== Film ===
Her early film roles included the horror film Terror, and the football drama Yesterday's Hero starring Ian McShane. She appeared as Lady Caroline in Michael Winner's 1983 remake of The Wicked Lady, which starred Faye Dunaway. In 1989, she appeared as Elisabeth Jekyll in Edge of Sanity, and the 1997 film Déjà Vu alongside Vanessa Redgrave. She appeared as Anthea Davis in On the Nose in 2001 along with Dan Aykroyd and Robbie Coltrane.

== Personal life ==
Glynis van der Riet married actor Paul Antony-Barber, whom she met at drama school, in 1977; the couple divorced in 1979. During the filming of Blake's 7 she had a relationship with co-star Steven Pacey.

She married her Dempsey and Makepeace co-star Michael Brandon on 18 November 1989; the couple have a son.

== Filmography ==
=== Film ===
Year	Title	Role	Notes
1978	Terror	Carol Tucker	
1979	Yesterday's Hero	Susan	
1982	Invaders of the Lost Gold	Janice Jefferson	
1982	Tangiers	Beth	
1983	The Wicked Lady	Caroline	
1989	Edge of Sanity	Elisabeth Jekyll	
1992	The Mirror Crack'd from Side to Side	Lola Brewster	
1995	The Apocalypse Watch	Janine Courtland	
1997	Déjà Vu	Claire	
1998	Beings	Nancy Preston	
2001	On the Nose	Anthea Davis	
2013	Hammer of the Gods	Astrid	
2014	Edge of Tomorrow	General Tiernan	Scene cut
2015	Point Break	FBI Head of Investigations	
2019	Passport to Oblivion	Simone	Voice
2025	Dream Hacker	Sue Hamilton	

=== Television ===
Year	Title	Role	Notes
1978, 1981	Blake's 7	Mutoid/Soolin	Episode: "Project Avalon", Season 4
1979	BBC Play of the Month	Ethel Voysey	Episode: "The Voysey Inheritance"
1980	The History of Mr. Polly	Christabel	Episode: #1.2
1980	The Sandbaggers	Margaret Muller	Episode: "To Hell with Justice"
1980–1981	Sherlock Holmes and Doctor Watson	Sophie/Meredith Stanhope	2 episodes
1981	Bognor	Secretary	Episode: "Deadline"
1981	A Fine Romance	Linda	Episode: "Unlucky in Love"
1981	Kelly Monteith	Various	Episode: #3.4
1982	The New Adventures of Lucky Jim	Lucy Simmons	Main cast
1982–1984	Jane	Jane	Title character
1983	The Hound of the Baskervilles	Beryl Stapleton	TV movie
1985–1986	Dempsey and Makepeace	Sgt (Lady) Harriet Makepeace	Title character
1986	Love and Marriage	Fiona Jebb	Episode: "Demons"
1987	Screen Two	Lucy	Episode: "Visitors"
1988	Tales of the Unexpected	Lilian / Sylvia Brett	Episode: "The Dead Don't Steal"
1989	Monsters	Dr. Jarris	Episode: "Mannikins of Horror"
1991	Palace Guard	Danielle	Episode: "Iced"
1994	Diagnosis Murder	Samantha Litvak	Episode: "Georgia on My Mind"
1994–1995	Turbocharged Thunderbirds	Tin-Tin; Sally; Lady Penelope	4 episodes
1998	Babes in the Wood	Angela	Episode: ##1.6
1999	Highlander: The Raven	Rachel	Episode: "The Rogue"
1999	The Bill	Victoria Smith	Episode: "Sleeping with the Enemy"
2000	Doctors	Miranda Stockton	Episode: "Love You Madly"
2001	Dark Realm	Mrs. Parker	Episode: "The House Sitter"
2001–2003	Night & Day	Fiona Brake / Gwen	Main cast
2003	The Afternoon Play	Brenda	Episode: "Turkish Delight"
2003	Murphy's Law	Patricia Morris	Episode: "Kiss and Tell"
2005	Family Affairs	Belinda Heath	5 episodes
2006–2007	Trial & Retribution	Dora Hills	2 episodes
2006–2007	Emmerdale	DCI Grace Barraclough	18 episodes
2009	New Tricks	Cheryl Brooker	Episode: "The Truth Is Out There"
2009–2011	The Royal	Jean McAteer	Main cast (Series 8)
2010–2011, 2016–2017	EastEnders	Glenda Mitchell	109 episodes
2013	Law & Order: UK	Sue Pendle	Episode: "Dependent"
2013	Comedy Feeds	Cynthia	Episode: "Bamboo"
2013	Casualty	Barbara Cullen	Episode: "Three's a Crowd"
2013	Marple	Cora Van Stuyvesant	Episode: "Endless Night"
2018	Royal Hearts	Joan	TV movie
2019	London Kills	Kirsten Pryce MP	Episode: "The Politician's Son"
2019–2020	The Outpost	Gertrusha	Main cast (seasons 2–3) (Note: Credited as main cast only in the 7 episodes of seasons 2–3 in which she appeared, of the 26 total episodes aired in those seasons.)
2022–2024	Hollyoaks	Norma Crow	Series regular
2022	Silent Witness	Caroline Bergqvist	2 episodes

=== Audio ===
Year	Title	Role	Notes
2018	Blake's 7	Magda	Episode: "The Way Ahead"
2019	Doctor Who: The Fourth Doctor Adventures	Kathy Blake	Episode: "The Sinestran Kill"
2022	Doctor Who: The First Doctor Adventures	Nicholaa de la Haye	Episode: "The Outlaws"

=== Video games ===
Year	Title	Role	Notes
1996	Goosebumps: Escape from Horrorland	Mrs. Morris	
2001	Hostile Waters: Antaeus Rising	Church	

== Awards and nominations ==
Year	Award	Category	Work	Result	Ref.
2002	The British Soap Awards	Sexiest Female	Night and Day	Nominated	
2008	Digital Spy Soap Awards	Best Exit	Emmerdale	Nominated	
2011	The British Soap Awards	Villain of the Year	EastEnders	Nominated	
2022	Inside Soap Awards	Best Villain	Hollyoaks	Nominated	
2023	Inside Soap Awards	Best Villain	Hollyoaks	Pending	
