= Liam Bergin =

English actor and entrepreneur (born 1985)

- Born: Liam Frank Bergin; 24 November 1985 (age 40); London, England
- Occupations: Actor, Entrepreneur
- Years active: 2009–2010, 2016–2017 (actor); 2014–present (entrepreneur)

Liam Bergin (born 24 November 1985) is an English actor and entrepreneur of Irish and Trinidadian descent. He trained at the Guildhall School of Music and Drama, graduating in 2008. He is currently best known for playing Danny Mitchell in EastEnders and Rupert in Trinity. He has also had minor roles in Doctors and the 2009 remake of Minder.

On 26 December 2009 it was announced he had been cast in the role of Danny Mitchell in the long-running soap opera EastEnders. The character was phased out by mutual consent from the show with executive producer Bryan Kirkwood in April 2010. He returned for a guest stint between December 2016 and January 2017.

Since the summer of 2014, he has been running an independent clothing brand called 'Boom Done Shop'.

== Filmography ==
Year	Show	Role	Notes
2009	Minder	Carlo Rocks	1 episode: "Till Debt Do Us Part"
2009	Doctors	Sid Harvey	1 episode: "Flimflam Thank You Man"
2009	Trinity	Rupert	Main cast
2010, 2016–2017	EastEnders	Danny Mitchell	Series regular; 44 episodes
