= Marc Elliott =

English actor (born 1979)

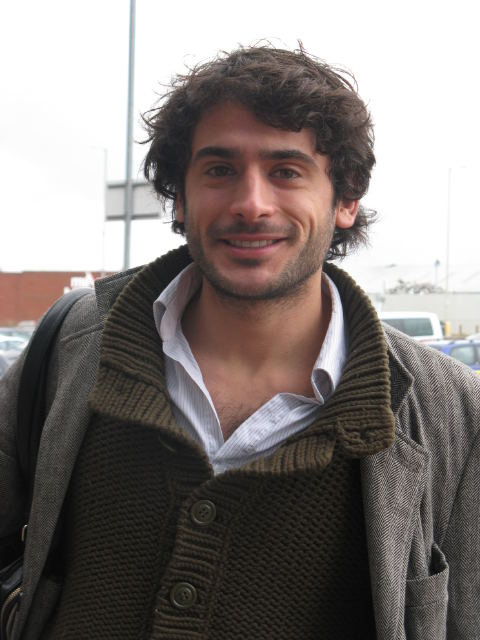
- Marc Elliott in 2011
- Occupation: Actor
- Years active: 1991–present
- Television: EastEnders (2009–12); Holby City (2016–17, 2019)

Marc Elliott (born 1979) is a British actor. He won a British Soap Award for his role as Syed Masood in the BBC soap opera EastEnders (2009–12). He has since played Isaac Mayfield in the medical drama Holby City (2016–19). He is also known for his theatre work.

== Personal life ==
Elliott was born to a Scottish father and an Anglo-Indian mother, and grew up in Stratford-upon-Avon. He has a twin sister and an older sister. Elliott attended Warwick School, an independent boys' school.

== Career ==
Before his television and stage debuts, Elliott's career began in radio hosting on various BBC radio stations.

Elliott has appeared in a number of productions at Stratford-Upon-Avon's Royal Shakespeare Theatre while studying at Warwick School. In 2006, he joined the cast of the acclaimed Royal National Production and following tour of The History Boys. With a mainly theatrical background before joining EastEnders he has appeared in Holby City and The Bill.

In 2009, Elliott was cast as Syed Masood in the BBC soap opera, EastEnders and he won the 2010 British Soap Award for Best Newcomer for this role. Syed was a gay Muslim struggling with his sexuality, family expectations and religion: his defining storyline was his gay affair with Christian Clarke. In September 2012, he announced he was leaving the soap, and on 15 November 2012 he made his last appearance.

After leaving EastEnders, Elliott joined the cast of Tape in the West End. In November 2013, Elliott appeared with The History Boys at the National Theatre 50 Years on Stage production, broadcast live by BBC Worldwide. In 2014 he appeared in Midsomer Murders: Wild Harvest and in the UK premiere of Urinetown: The Musical at St. James Theatre, as Mr. McQueen. He reprised his role in Urinetown with the West End transfer of the musical to the Apollo Theatre. In June 2016, Elliott made his first appearance as doctor Isaac Mayfield in the BBC medical drama Holby City. Since leaving Holby City in 2017, Elliot has continued to appear in stage productions across the UK. In 2019, he reprised his role in Holby City for a short stint. In 2022 he appeared in the BBC’s Call the Midwife as Anglo Indian train driver Lionel Corbett in a train crash disaster.

== Filmography ==
Year	Title	Role	Notes
2004	Mile High	Journalist	1 episode
2006	Lewis	Hal Bose	1 episode
2008	The Bill	Robbie Nash	1 episode
2008	The Invisibles	Lee Ellis	1 episode
2008	M.I. High	Jerome	1 episode
2009	Holby City	Nick Michaels	1 episode
2009	Diego's Story	Diego	Short film
2009–2012	EastEnders	Syed Masood	Series regular
2014	Midsomer Murders	Nick Iver	1 episode
2016–2017, 2019	Holby City	Isaac Mayfield	Series regular
2022	Call the Midwife	Lionel Corbett	2 episodes
2023	Juice	Dan	1 episode

== Stage ==
Year	Title	Role	Notes
1991–1991	Julius Caesar	Lucius	Royal Shakespeare Theatre, Stratford-upon-Avon / Theatre Royal, Newcastle
1992–1993	The Winter's Tale	Mamillius	Royal Shakespeare Theatre, Stratford-upon-Avon / Theatre Royal, Newcastle
1994	Macbeth	Fleance	Royal Shakespeare Theatre, Stratford-upon-Avon
1995	Lord of the Flies	Jack	The Other Place, Stratford-upon-Avon
2005–2007	The History Boys	Akthar	UK tour / Wyndham's Theatre, London
2012	Tape	Vince	Trafalgar Studios, London
2014	Urinetown: The Musical	Mr. McQueen	St. James Theatre / Apollo Theatre, London
2014	City of Angels	Pancho Vargas / Lieutenant Munoz	Donmar Warehouse, London
2015	See What I Wanna See	Thief / Reporter	Jermyn Street Theatre, London
2015	Into the Woods	Rapunzel's Prince	Royal Exchange, Manchester
2018	Othello	Roderigo / Lodovico	Everyman Theatre, Liverpool
2018	Sweet Chariot	Oscar	Nottingham Playhouse, Nottingham
2018–2019	Macbeth	Ross	Globe Theatre, London
2019	The Girl on the Train	Kamal Abdic	Duke of York's Theatre, London
2020	City of Angels	Pancho Vargas / Lieutenant Munoz	Garrick Theatre, London
2021–2022	She Loves Me	Ladislav Sipos	Crucible Theatre, Sheffield
2022–2023	The Father and the Assassin	Pandit Jawaharlal Nehru	National Theatre, London
2025	More Life	Victor	Royal Court Theatre, London
