= The Secret Mitchell =

Storyline in British soap opera EastEnders

Danielle Jones told Ronnie Mitchell that she was her mother during Peggy and Archie Mitchell's wedding day, broadcast on 2 April 2009.

"The Secret Mitchell" was a storyline in the BBC soap opera EastEnders involving the characters of Ronnie Mitchell (Samantha Womack) and Danielle Jones (Lauren Crace). The build-up to the storyline began in the episode broadcast on 18 August 2008 in which Danielle was introduced as a friend for Stacey Slater (Lacey Turner) and a love interest for Callum Monks (Elliott Jordan). The storyline gained more pace in October 2008 when it was revealed that Danielle was actually the daughter of Ronnie and that she came to Walford to find her.

Throughout late 2008 and early 2009, Danielle attempted to befriend Ronnie in the hope to build a relationship with her so she would accept her as her daughter when she told her about who she was. By spring 2009, Ronnie's father Archie Mitchell (Larry Lamb), who was responsible for Danielle, then called Amy, being put up for adoption when Ronnie was fourteen, discovers who she is, and attempts to persuade her to leave Walford and then plans to murder her which doesn't go through.

The storyline climaxed on 2 April 2009 when Danielle finally found the strength to tell Ronnie that she was her daughter, but Archie lies to Danielle about him telling Ronnie the truth. This proceeds Ronnie to throw her out, rejecting her. Ronnie shortly finds out that she was telling the truth and finally reunites with Danielle before being run over by Janine Butcher (Charlie Brooks), subsequently killing her, leaving Ronnie devastated and consumed with guilt for the way she treated her.

The episode which saw Danielle revealing to Ronnie that she was her daughter was watched by 11.46 million viewers. It became one of the most dramatic storylines in EastEnders and also impacted Stacey's bipolar diagnosis storyline and the "Who Killed Archie?" storyline.

== Plot ==
=== Build-up ===
In July 2007, two new characters were introduced into the show, Ronnie (Samantha Womack) and Roxy Mitchell (Rita Simons), as an extension of the Mitchell family and they arrived for the wedding of their cousin Phil Mitchell (Steve McFadden). Phil had discovered that his fiancée Stella Crawford (Sophie Thompson) had been abusing his son Ben (Charlie Jones) and she had killed herself after the reveal. Phil's mother Peggy Mitchell (Barbara Windsor) decided to take them all away to recover for a while and asked Ronnie and Roxy to look after their pub The Queen Victoria. This allowed the characters to develop and allowed the audience to get to know them. Roxy was depicted as being fun, impulsive and exciting, whereas Ronnie was seen as very closed, cold and guarded which became intriguing. A few months after their arrival, during an argument, Roxy implied there was a family secret between the two of them and a physical fight ensued.

In May 2008, during a quarrel with Roxy, Ronnie broke down and admitted to Peggy that she had fallen pregnant aged 14 and given birth to a daughter that she named Amy on 23 June 1989 and that her father Archie (Larry Lamb) had given Amy up for adoption just hours after she was born. Ronnie also revealed that she had given Amy a locket with a picture of herself as a 14-year-old in it, and kept an identical locket with a picture of Amy as a baby in it. Archie was introduced into the show in July 2008 when Roxy, Ronnie and Peggy went to visit him at his home in Weymouth. During a vicious row with Ronnie, Archie told her that Amy had died in an accident in the bath when she was a child. Archie later came to stay at Walford where he began a relationship with Peggy.

Then, in August 2008, a mysterious character, Danielle Jones (Lauren Crace), appeared, becoming friends with Stacey Slater (Lacey Turner). She later found work with the Mitchells and became caught up in the feud between Archie and Ronnie: Ronnie persuaded Danielle to steal Archie's letters; Archie in turn persuaded her to steal a reply to a letter Ronnie had sent to Amy's father, her former boyfriend Joel Reynolds (Cavan Clerkin). On 10 October 2008 when Ronnie discovered this, she sacked Danielle and called her pathetic. Danielle went home and burst into tears and was seen with an identical locket and photograph of a 14-year-old Ronnie in it, revealing to the audience that she was Ronnie's long-lost daughter Amy.

After this, Danielle frequently tried to get close to Ronnie, but something would always happen, leading to Ronnie shutting down and Danielle backing off. Feeling depressed, Danielle had sex with a barman called Paul at R&R on 23 December 2008. Then, in January 2009, she discovered she was pregnant. She confided in Ronnie about her pregnancy and how frightened she was at not knowing what to do. Ronnie comforted her and the pair became closer than ever before. Ronnie told her that she had given away a baby once, not realising that she was talking to that baby. Danielle and Ronnie then decided that she should have an abortion; even after her adoptive father, Andy Jones, tried to persuade her not to, she went ahead with it on 20 January 2009. She nearly told Ronnie her true identity, but Ronnie backed out of coming to her last appointment at the clinic, because Danielle's abortion brought back so many painful memories about Amy. She called Danielle, but instead told her that she backed out because R&R was busy, and when asked by Danielle if she regretted giving away her baby, she lied and said no and that she should have had an abortion, which crushed both Danielle and her. After deciding to leave Walford and return home to Telford, she left deciding that Ronnie would not want her in her life.

However, she returned in February. Danielle confided in Stacey that Ronnie was her mother, but stated that she was trying to find the right time to tell her. She was furious when Stacey kissed Paul and told him about her abortion, and also when Stacey threatened to tell Ronnie the truth. Danielle pinned Stacey to the wall and warned her off this course of action, but began to make attempts to reveal her true identity to Ronnie. She became increasingly angry with her mother, going as far as to paint "evil cow" on her front door.

Danielle decided that she would tell Ronnie who she really was, and then leave Walford for good, but was stopped by Archie, who found her locket. Initially assuming it was Ronnie's, and that Danielle had been trying to steal it, he opened it and saw the picture of Ronnie and realised that she was Ronnie's daughter and his granddaughter. During their talk, Danielle admitted she had discovered all about Ronnie from the adoption agency and was going to get in touch with her, but, because she didn't know what she was like, decided to get to know her first so came to Walford to have a look. Because of Archie's previous lie to Ronnie about Amy's death as an infant, Danielle (albeit unknowingly) posed a huge threat to him because things were going incredibly well between him and Ronnie, and the discovery that his story was a lie would destroy his relationship with Ronnie, and would also mean ostracism form the rest of his family, including Roxy and Peggy, to whom he was now engaged. In order to preserve his story, he told Danielle that Ronnie believed she was dead because of a letter from the adoption agency, and that Ronnie suffered from depression, so asked Danielle to keep quiet for a little while longer, in order to protect her mental health.

=== The reveal ===
During the end of March, Danielle grew more and more desperate to tell Ronnie, even believing that when she told her, she would be a bridesmaid at Archie and Peggy's wedding. Then on 31 March (although set on 1 April), Archie prepared to kill Danielle by strangling her to death. However, he failed, and told Danielle that he had told Ronnie, and that she had rejected her and given him money to get rid of her. This crushed Danielle, and Archie told her to leave for good. Danielle did not, however, and on the wedding day, placed her locket in Ronnie's champagne glass, before going upstairs to confront her. She then admitted to Ronnie that after a seven-month silence, she was her daughter, and was shocked to realise that Ronnie did not know who she was. Ronnie refused to believe her, and helped her father throw her out, proclaiming, "Who would want to have a daughter like you!"

Danielle then planned to leave. At the Queen Vic, Ronnie delivered a heartfelt toast to Archie, but then discovered the locket in her champagne glass, realising to her horror and shock that Danielle was her daughter. It dawned on her that Danielle was telling the truth, that Archie had lied to her, and that the daughter she had craved all her life had been under her nose for eight months. She tearfully declared this in front of the whole wedding reception, and then chased after Danielle. Archie caught up with her, and their exchange was overheard by Peggy. Ronnie caught up with Danielle, and tearfully called her Amy. Realising Ronnie now knew who she was, a delighted Danielle ran forward into the road and was suddenly hit by a car driven by Janine Butcher (Charlie Brooks). Ronnie cradled her in her arms and told her that she was sorry, that she never wanted to give her away and that it had cursed her whole life; she had always dreamed of finding her, and told her they would have a proper mother-daughter relationship. Danielle tearfully called her "Mum", moments before dying, as Roxy, Stacey and Janine watched.

=== Aftermath ===
Any chance of a reconciliation between Ronnie and Archie was destroyed forever. Horrified that Archie could lie to both Danielle and Ronnie - his own family - in such a way, Peggy threw Archie out and ended their marriage, while Roxy threw his belongings into the road, telling him to never come back. Peggy was upset to discover Archie was still in Walford, and determined to avenge Ronnie and Danielle, ordered Phil to kill him. Archie was bundled into the back of a van on 10 April, and bound and gagged in The Arches. Phil tricked Archie into believing he was going to kill him, but instead frightened him out of Walford; when Peggy found this out, she was furious. Meanwhile, Stacey began acting strangely towards everyone, and it was revealed that the death of Danielle was one of the events that triggered her bipolar disorder.

The Mitchells' continued resentment towards Archie provided several motives in the subsequent "Who Killed Archie?" storyline.

== Creation ==
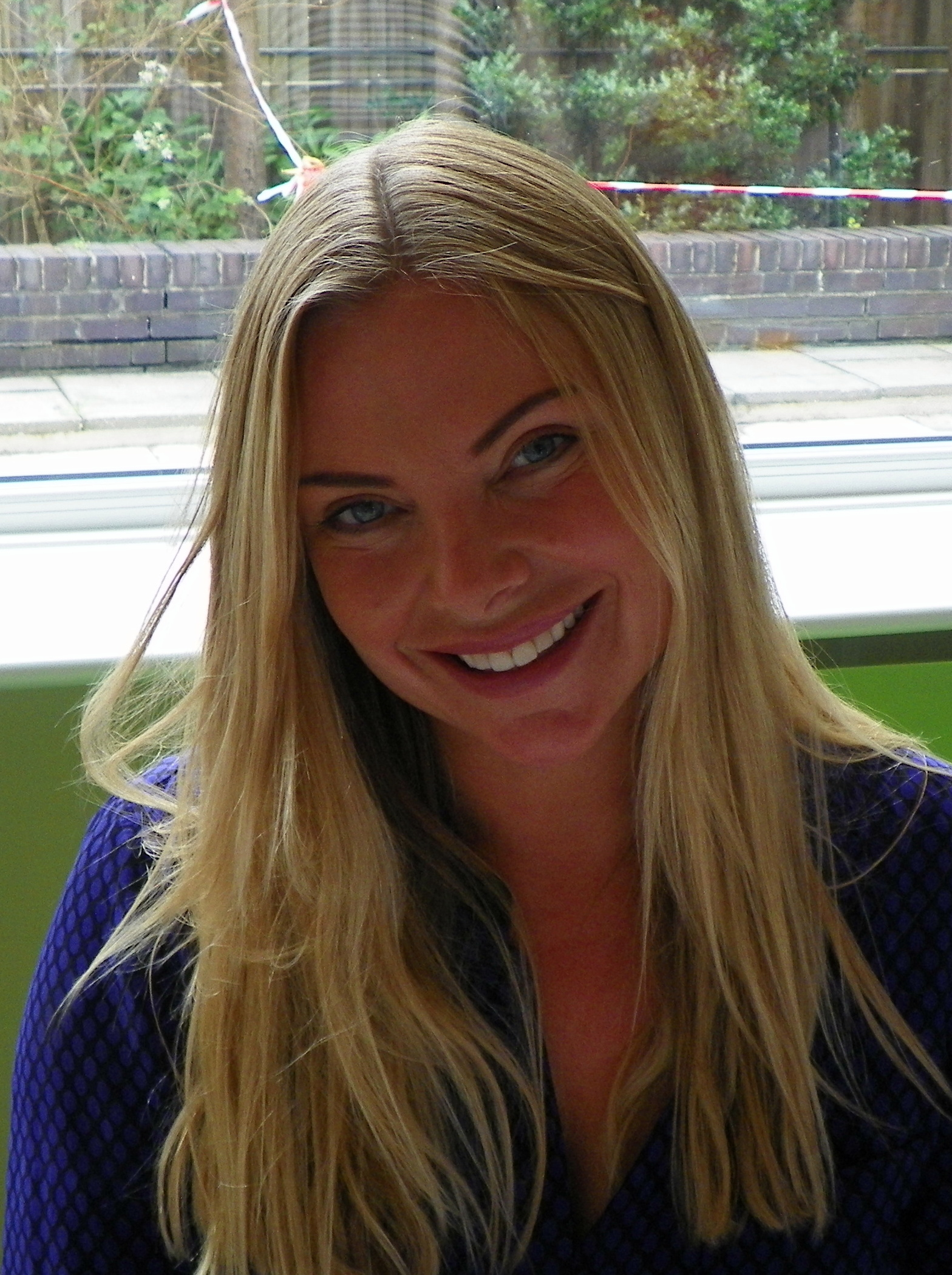
It was revealed that Samantha Womack's character Ronnie Mitchell had given a child up for adoption.

The "Secret Mitchell" storyline was conceived in 2007, when story producer Dominic Treadwell-Collins first developed the idea of two new Mitchell sisters, Ronnie and Roxy (Rita Simons). Ronnie was intended to come across as the more detached and icy sister and a hidden secret was first alluded to eight months after their introduction, when Roxy made a veiled reference to Ronnie's child and a physical fight ensued. Several months later, off-set episodes shot in Weymouth and dubbed "Mitchell Week" were aired, during which the audience were introduced to Ronnie and Roxy's father Archie (Larry Lamb), and learned that Ronnie had given a child up for adoption. Treadwell-Collins explained that it was necessary to introduce Danielle shortly after this revelation, but in such a manner that she would arrive "under the audience's radar", to preserve the later revelation of her identity as Ronnie's daughter. The role of Danielle was given to the then-unknown actress Lauren Crace, who commented: "I'm thrilled. It's a great first role and I just can't wait to see what is in store." Crace accepted the role whilst still in her third year at the Royal Academy of Dramatic Art. Crace's casting was announced on 19 July 2008, when Danielle was described as the future love interest of fellow newcomer Callum Monks.The show's producers attempted to deliberately deceive the audience into believing Danielle was nothing more than Callum's love interest, and a new friend for Stacey Slater. Crace herself was only told of Danielle's true identity after her successful audition, though as she only signed a six-month contract with the show, was always aware Danielle would only have a short arc. She has stated that some audience members guessed Danielle to be Ronnie's daughter almost as soon as she arrived, and that she found maintaining the secret to be difficult.

== Development ==
The revelation that Danielle was Ronnie's long-lost daughter was made to the audience when, after rowing with Ronnie, Danielle opened the locket she wore to reveal a photograph of her birth mother inside. Crace commented at the time that: "Being part of such a big storyline is exciting and challenging for any actress." Explaining the back-story from Danielle's point of view, she detailed: "When Danielle's adoptive mother died, she thought it was time to find out who her real mother was. She always knew she was adopted. She also had a locket with a picture of Ronnie in it that was given to her when she was put up for adoption. She went to the adoption agency and found out that Ronnie had also been looking for her - the agency then gave her details of her mother's whereabouts." Questioned on whether she thought Danielle hoped to have a relationship with Ronnie, she responded: "Deep down, absolutely... she's completely intrigued by Ronnie and the Mitchell clan, but at the same time very nervous of them. In her head she thinks they are too different and Ronnie would be disappointed to know she was her daughter". Series writer Simon Ashdown explained of why Danielle kept her identity secret: "The idea about Danielle was that she was hurt and broken by her life and being rejected by this mother that the thing she fears worst of all is being rejected again. So she holds off, she wants to get to know Ronnie, and charm her and make her like her and then tell Ronnie who she is."

=== Abortion ===
The relationship between the two began to develop when Danielle fell pregnant, and was supported in seeking an abortion by Ronnie. Treadwell-Collins has explained that Danielle's pregnancy was a plot-device to bring the two closer together, discussing the tragedy of Ronnie being unaware she was encouraging the aborting of her own grandchild. Of Danielle's emotions during this period, Crace illuminated: "Having Ronnie show her some affection and willingly offering to come with her and to help her and give her advice, it was a huge thing for Danielle, because from always being knocked back by Ronnie, from always being knocked back by everybody, suddenly someone out of the blue offered to help her, and it was the one person in the world that she wants to be there." When Ronnie failed to attend Danielle's second clinic appointment, Danielle was, in Crace's opinion, "hurt and distraught", describing the development as "a step back for Danielle" whereby "she probably feels less willing than ever to tell Ronnie the truth than before". On Ronnie's part, Janus assessed that "Ronnie knows she wants to help this young girl but she's not sure why they have this bond". She explained: "Ronnie knows that Danielle is very vulnerable and is in Walford with no family and only a few friends. As Ronnie gave her a job in R&R maybe she thinks that Danielle interpreted that as more than it was." Asked if Ronnie had noticed the resemblance between herself and Danielle, Janus responded: "She has never thought about any resemblance - why would she? As far as Ronnie is aware her baby died so the thought would never have crossed her mind." Following Ronnie's failure to attend her second appointment, the character briefly departed from the series, said to have returned to her native Telford.

=== Revelation ===
Danielle returned from Telford "on the edge emotionally", and increasingly angry with Ronnie, believing that she deserved to belong to the Mitchell family. The writers had Archie Mitchell discover her secret as "a test of character", posing the question: "would he be despicable and sick enough not to tell Ronnie?" He is capable of anything to maintain control over the family including manipulation. Lamb commented that his character felt Danielle posed "a huge threat" to his family, explaining why he lied that Ronnie was suffering from depression and Danielle ought not tell her. Crace commented that her character "thinks that's why [Ronnie] is always so hot and cold with her […] she takes it upon herself to try to look after Ronnie and help her to get well again." She offered the insight that although Danielle sees Archie as "a domineering figure", she initially trusts him and believes he will reunite her with her mother when the time is right. However, as time passes, "she starts to see Archie's true colours and is scared by this different side to him." Asked how Danielle feels about being accepted into the Mitchell family, Crace explained: "When she first came to Albert Square, Danielle didn't really know what to expect. For one thing, she never thought her mum would be so young and attractive and own a night club. That's pretty cool! But she is so pleased that Ronnie is her mother and can't wait for her secret to be revealed at last." On Danielle's developing relationship with Ronnie at the time, Crace expanded: "Those two have such a turbulent relationship - one minute Ronnie's really nice to Danielle, the next she's ignoring her and calling her a freak. But at the end of the day, Ronnie's her mum, and deep down, that's all Danielle has ever wanted."

The ultimate revelation of Danielle's true identity was set at Archie's wedding to Peggy (Barbara Windsor), matriarch of the Mitchell family. Crace deemed the wedding "the perfect opportunity" for the storyline to conclude, while Santer explained: "Weddings are great because the bring the community together. A wedding gives you a stage, it gives you an event, the context to play things out, so it felt right that these big Mitchell stories would collide at Peggy's wedding." Writer James Payne concurred: "There's no point making the reveal of the Mitchell secret in the caff at half past nine in the morning over a bacon sandwich, it's not EastEnders. EastEnders at its best will make that moment as dramatic and sensational as it possibly can be." The episode saw Danielle announce that she was Ronnie's daughter in front of the entire wedding reception party, in what Crace has named her favourite scene on the show. She opined that the disbelief Danielle was faced with was "heartbreaking" and served to highlight the fact that "she came as the outsider and she still is the outsider because no one steps in to help her".

=== Death ===
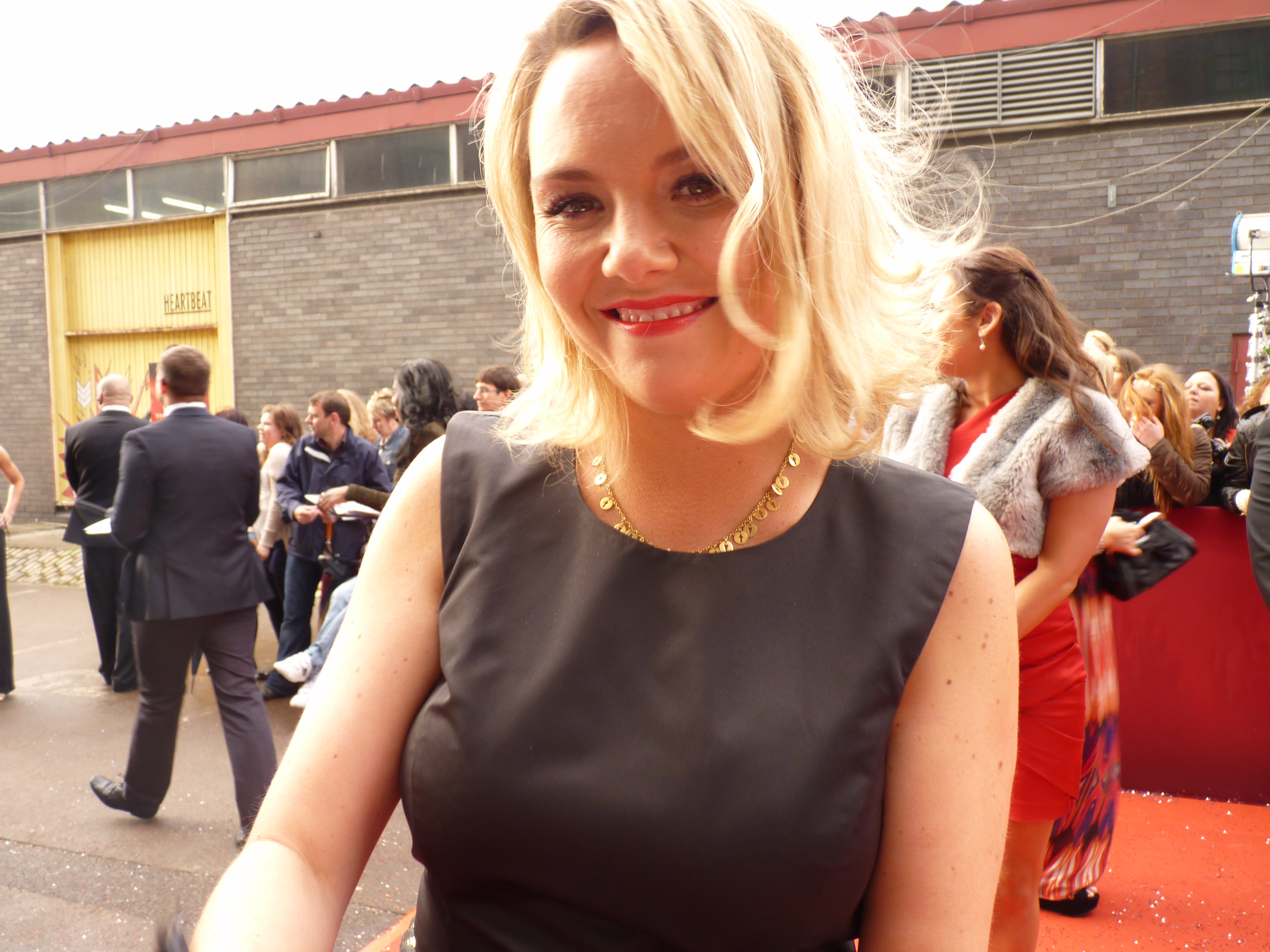
Danielle was killed-off by Charlie Brooks' character Janine Butcher

The character was killed off on 2 April 2009, run down by a car minutes after revealing her true identity to Ronnie, and subsequently dying in her mother's arms. Although different outcomes to the storyline were considered, Santer explained that "we always came back to [Danielle dying] because in the end, Ronnie is our tragic heroine character". Treadwell-Collins opined that "to give Ronnie her daughter at the last minute and then take her away suddenly is horrible, and the viewers could hate us for it. But if you have Ronnie have her daughter, this one thing that is key to her character, you weaken her character as you go along." Santer agreed that while having Ronnie and Danielle spend time together as mother and daughter would be touching, ultimately it would become boring. The scene in which Danielle dies was filmed during winter, but as it was set in early April, snow had to be cleared away from the set before filming could commence. A body double was used for the moment Danielle was run over. Crace deemed her final scenes: "Really tough, but great", expanding: "For so long you have so many scenes where you're just getting coffees in the caff or standing around in the back of Vic scenes, and then suddenly when you leave you get written for and you've got all these amazing scenes, and I had such great scenes with Larry and with Sam. And those last few scenes in the Vic with myself and Sam were so, so tough, it was such a hard day and I went home feeling like hell, but it was worth it." Although sad to leave, she felt that the story's conclusion was the right one, and was glad that Ronnie and Danielle finally shared a brief moment in the end, explaining: "It was so important that that tender moment was finally found, because that's all people wanted. It's all Danielle wanted, and it's all Ronnie wants." Crace concluded: "I think Danielle will leave quite a big mark on the Square and on the people in the Square - probably a bigger mark than she did when she was alive."

News of Danielle's death was subject to a media embargo, although several newspapers and magazines including the Radio Times leaked news of Crace's exit in advance of the event. Digital Spy's Kris Green reports that most of the online EastEnders community had anticipated the character's exit from the soap beforehand, some as early as January 2009. Danielle's death received a mixed reaction from the EastEnders fanbase. The decision was defended by Santer, who stated:

Last night's EastEnders contained all the elements of a classic soap episode – a wedding, high drama and tragedy. We acknowledge that we didn't deliver the happy ending that many of the audience may have been hoping for, and that for some people this was upsetting. We hope viewers understand that our aim is to deliver the best drama. That doesn't always lead to a happy ending. EastEnders - like all good drama - contains a balance of storylines, both happy and sad. We're proud of the episode, the storyline which built up to it and the way the audience have engaged with it.

— Diederick Santer, bbc.co.uk

== Reception ==
Throughout the storyline the ratings were around seven or eight million; rising to around 9 million for the episode in October 2008 revealing that Danielle was Ronnie's daughter. The climax episode on 2 April 2009 drew in an average figure of 11.5 million viewers; peaking to 13.1 million viewers, causing a power surge. The power grid usually sees a surge of 500 MW at the end of an average episode of EastEnders—at 20:30 the grid saw a surge of 1,270 MW. A special episode entitled "EastEnders Revealed: The Secret Mitchell" was broadcast on 3 April 2009, giving the background of the storyline.

The storyline won "Best Storyline" at the Inside Soap Awards. and won "Best Soap Storyline" at the TV Choice Awards In addition, Lauren Crace won "Best Newcomer" at the TV Choice Awards, for her portrayal of Danielle.

Duncan Lindsay, writing for the Metro, described the effect of Danielle's death as "an uproar of the kind soaps rarely ever see". Angie Quinn of MyLondon deemed her death "tragic", and said she had been "doomed". The scene has also been called one of the soap's "most shocking scenes".

== See also ==
- Chinatown
- Kat & Zoe
