= Who Killed Archie? =

Storyline from the BBC soap opera EastEnders

Stacey Branning confesses to her father-in-law Max Branning that she killed Archie Mitchell in the live episode broadcast on 19 February 2010.

"Who Killed Archie?" is a storyline from the BBC soap opera EastEnders. It began on 25 December 2009, Christmas Day, when the character Archie Mitchell, played by Larry Lamb, was murdered by an unseen person. Events leading up to and following the murder put several characters in the frame, in the style of a Whodunit mystery. The culprit was kept a tight secret within the production crew as well, with only seven people knowing the identity of the killer. The murderer was revealed as Stacey Branning (Lacey Turner) during a live episode titled "EastEnders Live", broadcast on 19 February 2010, the show's 25th anniversary. Turner was told thirty minutes before the broadcast that Stacey was the killer, and actors rehearsed several possible endings. Finally, a two-hander episode between Stacey and her ex-lover and father-in-law Max Branning (Jake Wood) on 26 March 2010 explained how she killed Archie - who had previously been the show's main antagonist prior to the character's death and murder storyline.

== Storyline creation and development ==
The storyline was created in spring 2009 during a story conference, where executive producer Diederick Santer, storyliner Dominic Treadwell-Collins, series consultant and lead writer Simon Ashdown, series producer Lorraine Newman, script producer Sharon Batten, and Controller of BBC Drama Production John Yorke were considering what to do for the Christmas Day 2009 and 25th anniversary episodes. They discussed the character Archie Mitchell and how everyone hated him, and decided on a storyline with characters' hatred and anger towards Archie building up before Christmas, with a peak on Christmas Day when he is killed and another for the reveal on the 19 February 2010 anniversary. They decided to keep the killer's identity a secret within the small group and decided to reveal it during a live episode so that the secret could be kept for as long as possible, and managed the story on a need-to-know basis. The live episode's director, Clive Arnold, became the seventh person to discover the identity of the murderer. They went through the characters to decide who would create a "shiver" moment, and decided against Janine, even though she could have done it, because she has killed before. The killer was going to be Archie's wife Peggy Mitchell (Barbara Windsor), until producers discovered Windsor had planned to leave the show, so they decided on Stacey. Although scripts initially diverted attention away from Stacey, Santer realised that drawing attention away from her too much might make it more apparent.

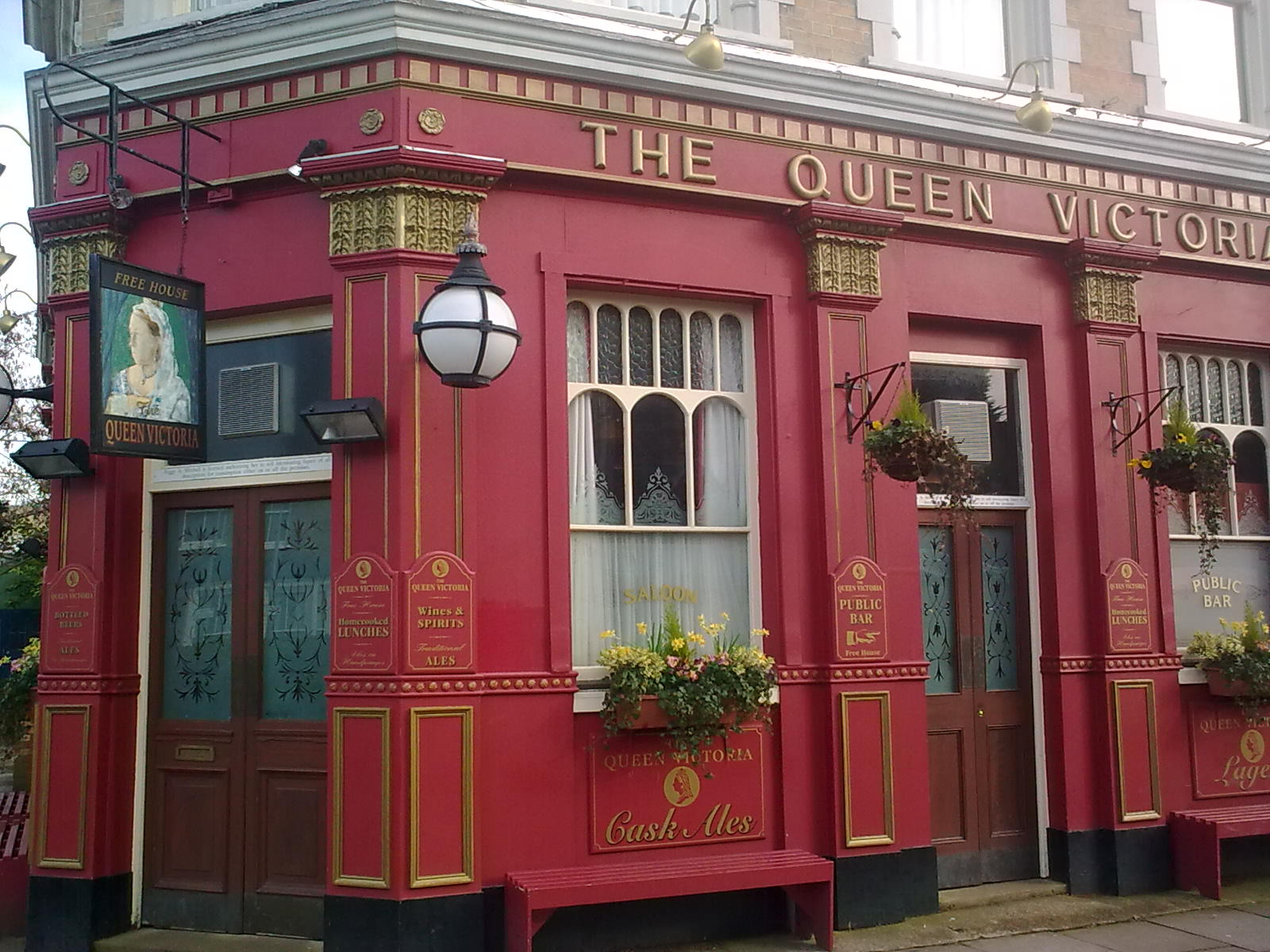
Archie Mitchell was murdered inside The Queen Victoria.

Santer said there were three big clues to the killer's identity, "one in the Christmas Day episode, one more recently than Christmas and there's another one that, if I were to tell you where it was, would perhaps give it away too easily," however, in a chat with Sharon Marshall shown on This Morning on 18 February 2010, he said the second clue was about halfway through the investigation and the third was "on screen but not necessarily in the programme". He also said that the outcome would be "surprising", "satisfying" and "in retrospect, inevitable", adding that "it makes sense". Santer confirmed the clues in an interview on the EastEnders website: on Christmas Day Stacey disappears and it is never explained why, and then reappears on Boxing Day appearing "not quite with it"; Stacey is the only character still sufficiently angry enough to spit on Archie's grave at his funeral; and Stacey is the first character to feature in the Christmas Day trailers.

Plans to broadcast the first ever live episode of EastEnders were announced by the BBC on 15 September 2009. Santer initially refrained from discussing the episode's plot, but commented that it would resolve a "big storyline" which would "keep the audience (as well as the cast and crew) guessing until the very last moment." Santer confirmed that Archie's killer would be revealed in the live episode, and that their identity would be kept secret until the night of broadcast, even from the cast member playing them. The EastEnders cast and crew had two weeks to rehearse the episode prior to its live transmission. The script was issued on the afternoon of 5 February 2010, written by Simon Ashdown. The first read-through took place on 8 February 2010, though producers held back the part of the script revealing Archie's true killer. Ten different possible endings were scripted and rehearsed, each showing one character confessing to the murder. The ten characters were Janine Butcher (Charlie Brooks), Jack Branning (Scott Maslen), Ronnie Mitchell (Samantha Womack), Max Branning (Jake Wood), Ian Beale (Adam Woodyatt), Phil Mitchell (Steve McFadden), Billy Mitchell (Perry Fenwick), Ryan Malloy (Neil McDermott), Peggy and Stacey. Santer reiterated that the actor playing the killer would only be told so thirty minutes before the broadcast. He explained that the killer "may be revealed to the audience rather than the Square", preserving secrecy as the crew began filming episodes to be transmitted after the live broadcast. Brooks, who plays Archie's former lover Janine, found the secrecy difficult to work with, explaining: "In the episodes to be shown afterwards, you're being told to look or speak a certain way, but not why." Santer confirmed that the cast found the episode challenging, stating: "They are as desperate to know who did it as the viewers." Actor Charlie Clements, who played Bradley Branning, announced in November 2009 that he would be leaving the soap in 2010.

The moment Turner was told Stacey was the killer was filmed for a live reaction show broadcast immediately after "EastEnders Live" on BBC Three, though it was not broadcast. EastEnders Live: The Aftermath was presented by Lamb's son George and included other behind-the-scenes material. Turner received a call to see Santer about 20 minutes before the broadcast, where she was told that Stacey was the killer. She explained that she had no idea her character was the murderer, even after receiving the call. She hoped viewers would sympathise with the character as she not only has to deal with the guilt of killing Archie but was also inadvertently responsible for Bradley's death. Wood was also told as he supported Turner in the final scene in which she was revealed as the killer. Santer also brought in Maslen and McDermott as decoys in case other cast and crew members realised. Following the live episode, a two-hander episode featuring Max and Stacey was announced. The episode, broadcast on 26 March 2010, explains how and why Stacey killed Archie.

=== Later development ===
Although the true identity of Archie's killer is kept a secret between Max and Stacey for several months, Max's daughter Lauren Branning (Jacqueline Jossa) becomes suspicious in November 2010 when Max tells her Bradley was innocent. Lauren suspects Max killed Archie as she becomes paranoid about his anger. Jossa said in an interview with website Digital Spy: "[Lauren]'s thinking about Archie's murder and realising that if Bradley didn't do it, it must have been someone else. As far as she knows, her dad is the only person who knows that Bradley didn't do it, so she's trying to put this puzzle together and it's all adding up to Max being the killer, because everything he does seems to lead to a lot of aggression." However, Lauren soon works out that Stacey is the murderer after speaking to her. Jossa said she was excited that her character was one of only a select few to know the true identity of Archie's killer.

== Suspects and motives ==
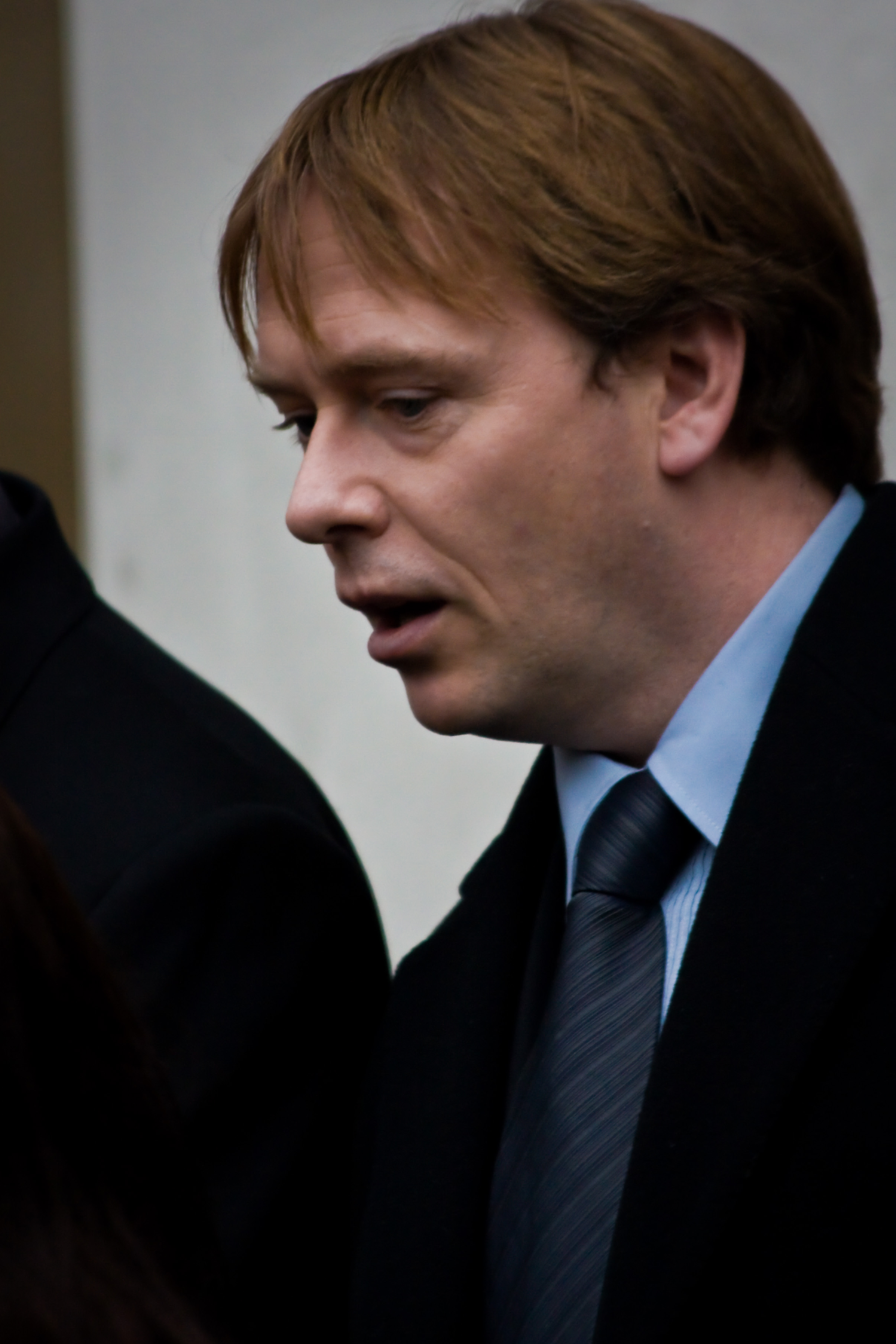
Adam Woodyatt (pictured) said it would have been plausible if his character Ian Beale had been the murderer.

There were officially ten suspects for the murder, though the ten were not known to viewers or cast members, who speculated about the identity of the killer. On Christmas Eve, storylines showed Archie evicting his wife Peggy, daughters Ronnie and Roxy, Peggy's son Phil and Phil's son Ben (Charlie Jones) from their home, The Queen Victoria public house, after he became the landlord. Ronnie had a further motive as Archie had caused her to suffer a miscarriage and she blamed him for the death of her daughter Danielle Jones (Lauren Crace) earlier in 2009. Peggy discovered that Archie had paid her daughter Sam Mitchell (Danniella Westbrook) to skip bail, thus plunging the Mitchells into debt, and Sam returned on Christmas Day to discover she had been manipulated. Phil was also a suspect after failing to kill Archie on Peggy's request earlier in 2009. Simons explained that the killer was likely to be the most unsuspecting person, and stated that Roxy was "pretty much the only non-suspect," but said she felt the character would not go so far as to kill her father, even though she had seen his true colours. Woodyatt said his character, Ian Beale, would have done anything to stop his wife Jane (Laurie Brett) from finding out that he had sex with Janine, so it would be plausible if it turned out that Ian had killed Archie. Archie had a laptop recording of Ian and Janine together that he had threatened to give to Jane. Janine, who was engaged to Archie, also had a motive as Archie had been using her to gain ownership of The Queen Victoria and threw her out on Christmas Day. She was seen holding a knife before Archie was killed.

McDermott said his character, Ryan Malloy, "probably would have the balls to kill Archie" and it would be a possibility due to the character's past, although he accused Janine of the murder, making it unlikely unless he was "quite conniving." He stated Ryan's only motive would be out of love for Janine. Glynis Barber, who plays Archie's first wife Glenda Mitchell and was not seen in the programme until after the murder, said her instinct was that Glenda did not kill Archie, even though she had been told it was possible. Bradley Branning's motive came from the discovery that Archie raped his partner Stacey, and Clements said that if other characters knew, it would give Bradley a motive and the fact that Bradley punched Archie would make him a prime suspect. He stated that he hoped Bradley was not the killer, though in an interview with daytime television show This Morning, he stated it would be "quite historical to go down as the one who killed Archie Mitchell". The rape also gave Stacey a motive, and before she was sectioned in 2009 for bipolar disorder she accused Archie of trying to kill her. Jack Branning's motive came from his love for Ronnie and hatred of Archie, and he threatened Archie on Christmas Day. Maslen said it would be "great" if Jack was the murderer, but added that he may have taken the blame if Ronnie was guilty. Other possible suspects included Peggy's son Grant Mitchell (Ross Kemp), Billy Mitchell and Tracey the barmaid (Jane Slaughter). Slaughter said Tracey's only motive would be to protect The Queen Victoria or one of the Mitchells.

Odds on the killer's identity changed frequently in the fortnight preceding the transmission of "EastEnders Live". On 5 February, the clear favourite was Stacey Slater, with odds at Bodog of 2/1. By 9 February, Stacey's odds had shortened to 6/4, though the character dropped into third place by 12 February, usurped by her brother Sean Slater (Robert Kazinsky), who was last seen in the soap on 1 January 2009, at odds of 9/4, and Ben Mitchell at 7/2. On 14 February, the unlikely favourite became Tracey the barmaid, a background character whose odds shortened considerably from 40/1 to 11/4. Sean moved back into first place on 16 February, with odds of 2/1, and remained there until the eve of broadcast. Stacey Slater's odds fell to 16/1. William Hill had Sean as the favourite on 18 February with odds of 4/7, though on the morning of 19 February, Ben became the bookmakers' favourite. Polls on both the BBC website and on Digital Spy that ran in the week leading up to the live episode showed Bradley Branning as the person viewers most expected to be the killer, followed by Jack Branning, Ben Mitchell, Sean Slater and Sam Mitchell.

== Plot ==
=== Events leading up to the murder ===
On Archie Mitchell (Larry Lamb) and Peggy Mitchell's (Barbara Windsor) wedding day, the true identity of Danielle Jones (Lauren Crace) as Ronnie Mitchell's (Samantha Womack) daughter is revealed. Archie has told Ronnie that her daughter, whom he gave up for adoption as a baby, has died. Just after Ronnie realises the truth, Danielle is hit by a car driven by Janine Butcher (Charlie Brooks) and dies in Ronnie's arms.

Peggy throws Archie out and asks her son Phil Mitchell (Steve McFadden) to kill him, but Phil just forces him to leave. The Mitchells also form a new rivalry with Janine, as she was the one responsible for hitting Danielle with her car and causing her death.

Ronnie is the most hurt about this and struggles to cope. She starts another relationship with Jack Branning (Scott Maslen), leading to their engagement. However, upon realising she wants another baby, she leaves Walford for a while, selling her portion of the club to Jack, who in turn gives it to Archie. After returning, Ronnie sleeps with Ryan Malloy (Neil McDermott) and Owen Turner (Lee Ross), and becomes pregnant with Owen's child.

Stacey Slater (Lacey Turner), Danielle's best friend in Walford, is also deeply affected by the incident, which triggers her bipolar disorder. She becomes non-compliant with her medication, has sex with Ryan, and is attacked and raped by Archie at the launderette. She believes both men are planning to kill her and is involuntarily committed to hospital, where she befriends Becca Swanson (Simone James). Upon her return to Walford along with Becca, Stacey restarts a relationship with Bradley Branning (Charlie Clements) when he rejects his girlfriend Syd Chambers (Nina Toussaint-White) for her.

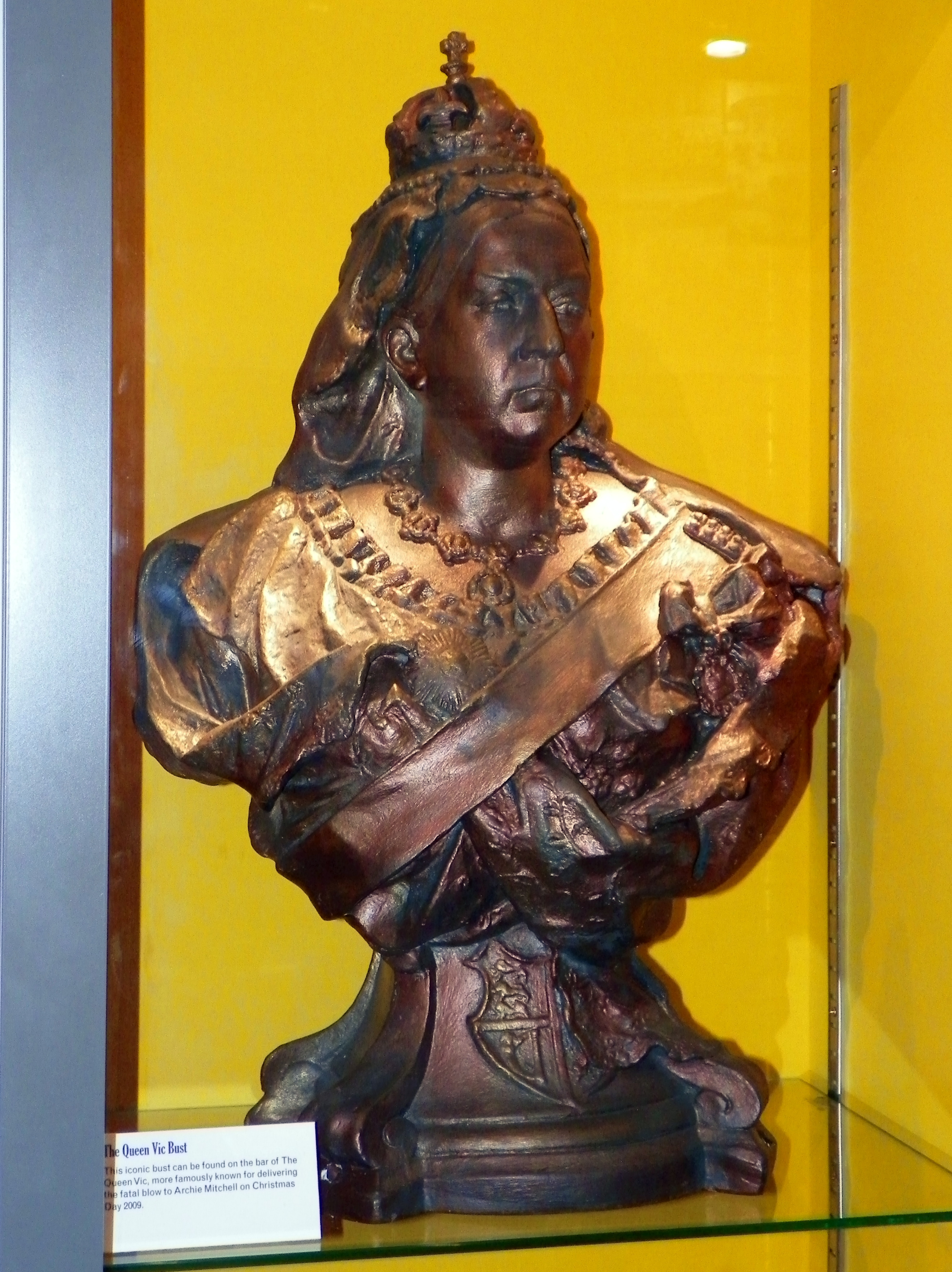
The Queen Victoria's bust of Queen Victoria (pictured on display at the Elstree and Borehamwood Museum) was the murder weapon in the storyline.

When Archie returns, he attempts to reconcile with Peggy, but comes up with a plan to steal the Mitchells' business, The Queen Victoria public house, with Janine's help. However, Janine, along with Ryan, whom she is dating, plans to steal it from Archie at the last minute. Peggy's daughter Sam Mitchell (Danniella Westbrook), who has been in Brazil on the run from police due to her involvement in the murder of Den Watts (Leslie Grantham), returns to Walford, thinking the charges have been dropped. She is subsequently arrested, and the Mitchells put up £250,000 bail to have her released. Archie convinces Sam to leave again, paying for her to go. Phil is then forced to take out a loan from Ian Beale (Adam Woodyatt). Ian accepts, on the condition that if the loan is not paid back within a certain time, he becomes owner of The Queen Victoria. Archie and Janine learn of this and try to get Ian to sell the loan to them. When Ian's wife Jane Beale (Laurie Brett) leaves him, Janine gets him drunk and has sex with him, making an audio recording of them together. Archie and Janine blackmail Ian into selling them the loan and Archie tells the Mitchells they are trespassing. Once Archie finds out that Janine plans to fleece him, he proposes to her to keep her from going astray. Ryan is hurt by this setback and ends his relationship with her. Ronnie stands up to Archie and he pushes her into the bar, not knowing she is pregnant, though Roxy Mitchell (Rita Simons) then reveals it. Ronnie has a miscarriage and Peggy tells Archie he has killed another of Ronnie's children, warning him to stay away from her. Peggy eventually hands over the keys and the family of Peggy, Phil, Ronnie, Roxy, Ben Mitchell (Charlie Jones) and Roxy's baby Amy Mitchell leave on 24 December 2009. They end up being taken in by Jack, who vows revenge on Archie.

On Christmas Day, Archie tells Ian the CD of the recording is under Ian's Christmas tree for Jane, but Ian fails to find it. Archie tells Janine that they should skip Christmas dinner as he has made a surprise treasure hunt for her. Janine eventually finds an envelope containing a one-way ticket to Gdańsk, Poland and Archie throws her out onto the street telling her he knows how she and Ryan tried to double-cross him. Archie is visited by Jack who threatens to kill him if he hurts Ronnie again. Archie finds Ian searching his living room for the CD and Archie says it is on his laptop and he can make copies at any time, threatening Ian with a phone call to Jane, before ejecting him from the pub. Ian leaves, though not before telling Archie that if he does call Jane he will wish he was dead. Sam then returns and attempts to confront Archie but he shuts the door on her. Ronnie subsequently arrives and tells him with no emotion that he will not make her care for him and she would not care if he died. Archie, after explaining how his father never smiled at him once and the impact had practically taught him to do the same, throws her out onto the street reminding her that it was the exact spot she pushed Danielle onto the night she died.

Shortly afterwards, Archie is visited by Peggy and he pleads with her to come home to him as she is the woman he loves. Peggy says she is not just a sweet and innocent old lady and that he has no idea who he is messing with. She tells Archie if he does not leave the pub that night he will regret every cruel and evil act he has ever done. He tells her that unless she returns he will have the pub converted to flats. He then becomes emotional as he tells Peggy that he will be waiting for her as she walks out on him. Bradley walks in and punches Archie in the face twice but accidentally punches the bar as well, cutting his hand. He tells Archie to stay away from his girlfriend Stacey because she has said Archie raped her three months previously which resulted in her becoming pregnant with his child, and Bradley leaves. As Archie picks up his snowglobe from the floor, the bust of Queen Victoria is pushed from the bar and hits him on the head.

=== After the murder ===
Ronnie finds Archie on the floor of The Queen Victoria and he apologises to her before he dies. When the police are notified of the death they arrest Ronnie, but later release her without charge. DCI Jill Marsden (Sophie Stanton) investigates the rest of the Mitchell family. Phil is given a false alibi by his friend Shirley Carter (Linda Henry), who finds a blood-stained shirt amongst his belongings. Phil explains that he found Archie dead and lost his balance, falling into the blood, but did not call the police because he panicked. They burn the shirt, and when Marsden visits them again, asking to see the clothes Phil was wearing at Christmas, Shirley produces a freshly laundered one. Shirley's flatmate Heather Trott (Cheryl Fergison) reveals that Phil was not really with Shirley on Christmas Day, prompting Shirley to make an anonymous call stating she saw Janine enter The Queen Victoria on the day of the murder, deflecting suspicion from Phil. Peggy and Phil attempt to pin the murder on Sam, who retaliates by blaming Peggy. Both are questioned by Marsden at the police station, and though Peggy is released without charge, Sam is arrested for breaking her bail.

Ian has Archie's laptop, and though he deletes the audio file of him and Janine from it, it later comes to light, and he and Jane throw the laptop into the canal. Janine attempts to blackmail Ian, and when he rebuffs her, she tells the police about the recording and the laptop, leading to his arrest. Ian admits to stealing the laptop from The Queen Victoria on Christmas Day, but denies murder. The police charge him with murder, but when Janine admits the truth, the charges are dropped.

Marsden and her colleague DC Wayne Hughes (Jamie Treacher) attend Archie's funeral, but do not see Stacey spit on Archie's grave. Jack, a former police officer, tells Hughes he can help out with any "local information" they might need. After the funeral, Bradley proposes to Stacey at the car lot, and she accepts. Jack later learns that Archie raped Stacey, that she is now pregnant with what she believes is Archie's baby, and that Bradley punched him on Christmas Day. Jack urges Bradley to tell the police what he did, desiring to keep Ronnie out of trouble. Marsden reveals she has a new forensic profile and a DNA screening process will begin. She asks all white males to volunteer for DNA screening, and when Bradley complies, Jack bribes Hughes to make the samples disappear.

A ring Roxy inherited from Archie, which went missing at Christmas, is planted in Janine's flat. Marsden receives an anonymous tip-off and Janine is arrested after the ring is found in her teapot. She is interviewed, but is released due to lack of evidence. She realises that Peggy planted the ring in an attempt to frame her. When Shirley thinks Phil is seeing another woman, she accuses him of only being interested in her for her alibi. He says it is not true, but she drunkenly threatens to withdraw the alibi, and walks to the police station.

Becca becomes hurt upon realising that Bradley and Stacey are getting married. While they are away at their own wedding, Becca steals a hairbrush with Archie's hair from The Queen Victoria, intending to have a DNA test done on Stacey's baby to prove if it is really Archie's. However, she has doubts and goes back with Stacey to return the brush, but is caught by Ronnie. Becca coerces Stacey to confess Archie raped her and the baby is his. However, Ronnie tells Stacey that Archie underwent an operation a few years back that left him infertile, meaning that Stacey's baby is not his. Roxy accuses Ronnie of murdering Archie. Ronnie denies it, but tells her she found out about Archie raping Stacey, and admits that Archie had also raped her as a child. Peggy tells the two of them that when Archie was murdered, she found him lying on the floor, took her divorce papers from the bar and left him to die. Phil tells Peggy about his alibi, the shirt and that he found Archie dead on Christmas Day. Shirley then returns and says Phil has got away with it as she has not told the police anything. Meanwhile, Becca anonymously reports to the police that Bradley had a motive for the murder.

Jack receives a call from Hughes to say that Bradley is about to be arrested and urges Bradley to leave Walford as quickly as possible. Bradley and Stacey quickly pack their bags at home. Max Branning (Jake Wood) says an emotional goodbye to his son and Jack agrees to help them escape. They leave via the back door as Max delays the police at the front, and hide a few streets away. Jack also leaves by the back door but Marsden sees him and he is unable to meet Bradley and Stacey, who are nervously waiting. Bradley says they should go without Jack, but when they go to get a taxi to St Pancras railway station, Bradley realises he has left the passports at home and goes back to get them, leaving Stacey to wait. However, Stacey grows impatient and phones him. The police notice him when his phone rings, and in a bid to escape them, he runs up a fire escape and crawls across the roof of The Queen Victoria with an officer following him. He shouts at Stacey to run, but stumbles and falls backwards from the roof to his death as the residents look on in horror. Max and Stacey are devastated, and he pulls her away from the body. She tells him it is her fault, as Bradley did not kill Archie, she did. The following day, Marsden says the police will no longer be pursuing the investigation. Stacey then goes missing, and on the day of Bradley's funeral, Jack receives news that a court has found Bradley guilty of Archie's murder.

Max tracks down Stacey to a flat where Stacey explains that she was angry at Archie and was worried about what Bradley would do to him after he found out about the baby. A minute after Bradley confronted Archie, she found Archie on the floor and, lucid and angered at what he had done to her and to Danielle, pushed the bust onto his head, but ran after his fingers twitched, fearing he would call the police. Stacey reveals that she did not initially tell Bradley the truth about what she did that night, fearing that he would take the blame for her. When she finally told him while they were packing on their wedding night, she offered to confess to the police herself, but he convinced her to flee Walford with him regardless. After forcibly trying to make her confess to the police, Max eventually tells Stacey that no one else needs to know that she killed Archie, reasoning that Bradley would want her to be happy, and sends her home. Becca continues to live with Stacey, and tries to exclude Stacey's mother Jean Slater (Gillian Wright) from her life. However, when Jean reveals Becca's involvement in Bradley's death, Stacey slaps Becca, which causes her to have a meltdown leading to getting kicked out by Jean as Stacey tells her mother she can trust her again. Later, Stacey figures out that Ryan must be her baby's father but decides not to tell him so as to not complicate his rekindled relationship with Janine, even when he is with her in the hospital as she gives birth to her daughter Lily. Several months later, at Janine and Ryan's wedding reception, Stacey confesses her fear about Archie still being alive to Peggy, who tells Stacey that Archie is dead and that Bradley killed him, accidentally causing Stacey to confess the truth to her. Peggy wants to call the police but after a fire at The Queen Victoria, Peggy tries to convince Stacey to admit to arson as the sentence would be a lot less than that for murder. She leaves Walford while letting Stacey take care of Lily who needs her. Stacey also tells Ryan that he is Lily's father, and although he initially refuses to acknowledge her, he later bonds with her and gets used to the idea of being a father while Janine and Stacey are arrested on a night out. Upset with this, Janine attempts to sabotage his relationship with Stacey, but her actions inadvertently cause them to realise their growing attraction to each other.

Max's daughter Lauren Branning (Jacqueline Jossa) becomes angry at Max for never mentioning Bradley, leading to his confessing that he knows Bradley did not kill Archie. Lauren starts to suspect Max as he has become violent towards other people, but he tells her he promised to look after the real killer, who is no longer a danger. When Lauren sees Stacey dancing with Max, she accuses her of flirting with Max, but Stacey says they are just friends and he promised he would always look out for her. Lauren realises that Stacey is the killer and tells Max she knows this. She confronts Stacey, who confesses, and Lauren records it on her mobile phone. Lauren later hands the recording to Janine as Stacey and Ryan have begun having an affair. Max wipes the recording so on Christmas Eve, Janine publicly announces in the pub after trying to play the recording that Stacey killed Archie. Outside, Stacey privately tells Ryan that Janine is telling the truth.

As Christmas Day runs through, Stacey experiences numerous upsetting thoughts about her role in Archie's death, and tells Jean about this. Upset, Jean takes Lily away from her, and things are made worse when Janine attempts to frame Stacey by stabbing herself while placing the knife in Stacey's hands and convincing Jean to call the police. Stacey considers suicide, but Max offers to help her flee the country. On the way, Stacey convinces Jean that Janine has framed her for the stabbing, and breaks off her romance with Ryan when he offers to come with her. Before Stacey and Max leave Walford with Lily, Ronnie and Roxy confront Stacey about the truth. Although Roxy wants her jailed, Ronnie quickly tells Stacey to go, feeling that she has suffered enough. Max drives Stacey to the airport, and tells her that he still loves her, offering to leave the country with her. Stacey tells him that the only man she has ever loved is Bradley. They share a teary and emotional goodbye with each other as Max watches Stacey leave for her flight. Stacey is last seen holding Lily in her arms while on the plane.

In 2014, Stacey is found living in London using a false name. Her cousin Kat Moon (Jessie Wallace) brings her back to Walford. Stacey is still wanted by the police for stabbing Janine, and is eventually seen by Ronnie and Roxy. Roxy threatens to call the police but Ronnie convinces her not to. However, after Janine drops the charges, Stacey decides that she needs to clear Bradley's name, so tells the police she killed Archie. She is subsequently sentenced to five years in prison, but she decides to appeal the sentence, taking her bipolar disorder into account. The appeal is successful and Stacey is released.

In 2019, while Stacey's old friend Ruby Allen (Louisa Lytton) tries to find some closure after being raped, she learns what Archie did to Stacey and they visit his grave together - with Ruby convincing Stacey to get the closure she needs in order to move forward with her life. Stacey does so by telling Archie off for his actions against her and ruining her life, before concludingly telling him he cannot hurt her anymore - nor does he deserve any sympathy from her or anybody else.

== Reception ==
Overnight figures showed that Archie's murder on 25 December 2009 was watched by 45.9% of the viewing audience for that time, an average of 10.9 million and a peak of 11.9 million. It was the most watched TV show on Christmas Day 2009 in the UK. The following episode where the murder was discovered was also the most watched show of the day, with overnight ratings of 8.1 million, representing a 37.9% audience share. The investigation storyline helped EastEnders become the most watched soap opera on British television for the first time in three years, with average viewing figures for January 2010 of 10.8 million (40.4% audience share) compared to Coronation Street's 10.4 million (38.2%). Overnight figures for the live episode indicated that it averaged 14.91 million viewers and a 54.6% audience share, peaking at 16.58 million with a 59.4% share in the final five minutes of broadcast when Stacey was revealed as the killer. The 10:30pm repeat of the episode on BBC Three drew a further 1.42 million viewers, attaining a 7.7% share. EastEnders Live: The Aftermath drew 4.3 million viewers and a 15.9% audience share, becoming BBC Three's highest rated programme ever, as well as the most-watched multichannel programme of the day. The documentary attained a further 1.21 million viewers and a 9.4% share upon its repeat at 11pm. Santer was delighted by the viewing figures, stating: "To get this incredible response from the audience is truly remarkable – these numbers go far beyond what we ever hoped for. I am so proud of our cast and crew for their incredible performance last night. This rating is the icing on our silver anniversary cake." Jay Hunt, controller of BBC One commented: "[The] extraordinary live episode was a fitting celebration of 25 magnificent years for EastEnders. The audience were clearly gripped by one of the greatest soap whodunnits ever." Discussing the ratings for EastEnders Live: The Aftermath, controller of BBC Three Danny Cohen appraised: "It is an amazing testament to the EastEnders team and the brave and brilliant drama they provided."

Archie's murder was compared to that of Den Watts in EastEnders in 2005 by Polly Hudson of the Daily Mirror, while Nancy Banks-Smith of The Guardian called it a rip-off of Citizen Kane. Andrew Grimes from Manchester Evening News said the Christmas Day episode was "in every sense compelling, and to my utter astonishment, a complete and utter joy", and John Gibson of Edinburgh Evening News gave the murder discovery episode on 26 December 2009 a negative review, saying "Hard to tell what was most horrific... the murder, which was bloody, the acting, which was dire, or the script, which was torture." Tim Teeman of The Times called the revelation of Stacey as Archie's killer a "genuine surprise", while Pat Stacey of The Evening Herald felt that revealing Stacey as Archie's killer was "a slight let-down" and "a little bit predictable". The storyline was nominated in the Killer Secret category at the 2010 All About Soap Bubble Awards. It also received a nomination in the Best Storyline category at the 2010 British Soap Awards and the Best Soap Storyline category at the 2010 TVChoice Awards. Real life police detectives criticised the portrayal of detectives in the show, saying that viewers who see them talking to residents about the case and accepting bribes may believe they operate that way in reality. The BBC insisted that a police consultant was used, adding that "this is heightened fiction and all the things that we show might not always represent real life." The storyline was referenced by Prime Minister Gordon Brown when referring to allegations of bullying, saying "The only thing I haven't been accused of is murdering that guy Archie Mitchell in EastEnders."

Bookmakers estimated that over £1 million would be spent gambling on the outcome of the storyline. Ladbrokes experienced its busiest ever 24 hours of gambling on a television series ahead of the episode's transmission, taking £100,000 in bets on 30 different characters, while William Hill took £500,000, surpassing the amount placed on Dallas's Who shot J.R.? storyline in 1980. Spokesman Rupert Adams commented: "The BBC were amazing keeping this quiet. We have broken even which in a market like this is amazing. We have had a roller-coaster but have enjoyed every minute."
