= Archie Mitchell =

Fictional character from EastEnders

- EastEnders character
- Larry Lamb as Archie Mitchell (2008)
- Portrayed by: Larry Lamb (2008–2009); Henry Garrett (2022 flashback)
- Duration: 2008–2009, 2022
- First appearance: Episode 3609; 8 July 2008
- Last appearance: Episode 6550; 5 September 2022
- Created by: Dominic Treadwell-Collins
- Introduced by: Diederick Santer (2008); Bryan Kirkwood (2010); Chris Clenshaw (2022)
In-universe information
- Other names: Archibald Lionel Mitchell
- Occupation: Businessman; Barman; Pub landlord
- Family: Mitchell
- Father: Philip Mitchell
- Mother: Sandra Mitchell
- Brothers: Eric Mitchell; Clive Mitchell
- Wife: Glenda Mitchell (backstory); Peggy Mitchell (2009)
- Daughters: Ronnie Mitchell; Roxy Mitchell
- Grandsons: James Branning; Matthew Mitchell Cotton
- Granddaughters: Danielle Jones; Amy Mitchell
- Aunts: Madge Mitchell
- Nephews: Phil Mitchell; Grant Mitchell
- Nieces: Sam Mitchell
- First cousins: Ted Mitchell; Stevie Mitchell
- Other relatives: Billy Mitchell; Will Mitchell; Janet Mitchell; Ben Mitchell

Archie Mitchell is a fictional character from the BBC soap opera EastEnders, played by Larry Lamb. He first appeared on 8 July 2008 as a newest member of the Mitchell family—who had first appeared on the soap in 1990—and became the show's main antagonist until the character was killed-off on Christmas Day 2009; with Archie making his last appearance as a corpse on 28 December 2009 and later serving as a posthumous impact throughout the majority of 2010, which involves making a brief voice appearance on 19 July 2010 on a family video tape overheard by his ex-wife Glenda Mitchell (Glynis Barber) and their daughters Ronnie (Samantha Womack) and Roxy Mitchell (Rita Simons).

The character's story arc began with Archie being reunited with both his daughters in Weymouth. While it quickly grew evident that Archie had seemingly shared a closer bond with Roxy, his relationship with Ronnie became volatile and tempestuous—after it had transpired Ronnie was previously forced by her father to give up her newborn baby, Amy, for adoption shortly after she gave birth to the child at the age of 14. He soon instigates trouble between his two daughters by scheming with Suzy Branning (Maggie O'Neill) to destroy Roxy's marriage with Sean Slater (Robert Kazinsky) and later manipulating Ronnie into disbelieving the fact that her employee Danielle Jones (Lauren Crace) is actually her long-lost daughter Amy—the latter of which consequently resulted in Danielle being killed in a hit and run on the day Archie married his sister-in-law Peggy (Barbara Windsor). He was then kidnapped by Peggy's son Phil (Steve McFadden) and subsequently forced to leave Walford for good, but Archie ended up returning with the intent of getting revenge on his family. His plans gradually came to light when Archie forged a romantic partnership with Peggy's hated stepdaughter Janine Butcher (Charlie Brooks); exploited Phil's sister Sam (Danniella Westbrook) while she was on the run for her involvement in the murder of the siblings' old enemy Den Watts (Leslie Grantham); and blackmailed Phil's stepson Ian Beale (Adam Woodyatt) with the knowledge that he cheated on his wife Jane (Laurie Brett)—which were all part of his scheme to successfully swindle his family from their beloved home, The Queen Victoria public house. He thereupon caused the death of Ronnie's unborn child and later betrayed Janine by leaving her temporarily homeless upon finding out that she and her boyfriend Ryan Malloy (Neil McDermott) plotted to defraud his wealth in their get-rich-quick scheme. Shortly afterwards, Archie got his comeuppance when he was murdered on Christmas Night 2009 after an unknown assailant pushed the Bust of Queen Victoria onto him. This had both ended the character's reign of terror in 2009 and triggered the events of his own whodunit storyline, dubbed Who Killed Archie?, that occurred in early 2010.

It was soon revealed two months later in the show's first live episode, "EastEnders Live", that Archie's murderer was in fact Sean's younger sister and Danielle's best friend: Stacey Slater (Lacey Turner)—whom he had raped on 6 October 2009 to cover-up his revenge scheme by escalating her bipolar disorder trauma, which led to Stacey being sectioned as a result of Archie raping her. During that same live episode, it also transpired that Archie had previously raped Ronnie back when she was 13; Ronnie would eventually describe this to her family on 20 July 2010.

A younger version of Archie appeared in a flashback episode that aired on 5 September 2022, being portrayed by Henry Garrett, with the episode focusing on the Mitchell family in the 1970s.

== Creation and development ==
The character of Archie was introduced in a group of episodes filmed on-location in Weymouth, Dorset. Viewers were made aware of his feud with daughter Ronnie after he made her give her baby up for adoption as a teenager. Larry Lamb discussed Archie and Ronnie's relationship in an interview with Radio Times: "He has a very chequered past - it's gone very wrong with Ronnie, while Roxy's his blue-eyed girl [...] he's a very family-oriented character and I think he finds the dissent between him and Ronnie a little bit tough to take." He has also said: "Ronnie brings out the worst in Archie, and he gets vicious. Archie wants to put right these long-standing problems he has with Ronnie. But things just get worse." An EastEnders source said of their relationship: "At the moment she has to play the game to get what she wants. But she is more than a match for Archie - and with Phil as back-up she is able to take him on. And one thing is for sure - it's going to be a spectacular war between these two."

The arrival of Archie was anticipated ever since the arrival of his daughters in July 2007, with several actors rumoured to be taking on the role. Janus told Digital Spy, "I would love the idea that this mad, iconic male [Archie] comes back into our lives. It needs to be someone dark – someone that gives a really wiry performance." Simons added, "I don't know why I've got this thing about Bob Hoskins. I've always wanted him to be my dad." Other actors mentioned by Janus and Simons include Terence Stamp, Malcolm McDowell, Michael Caine, Ian McShane and Ray Winstone. Winstone, a friend of Janus, denied claims that he would be playing Archie, joking "I'll play [Ronnie's] fella but I'm not playing her dad!" Veteran entertainer Lionel Blair was also rumoured to be playing Archie, but this was denied. The character's imminent arrival was announced in early March 2008, with Larry Lamb being cast in the role.

The character has been described by EastEnders executive producer Diederick Santer as "a Mitchell through and through, possessing the unique moral code which that legendary name implies", who will "set the cat amongst the Mitchell pigeons" and "[blow] the complex and darkly-veiled Mitchell world [...] apart." He is also described as "charismatic, authoritative, smart and proper old-school London" and an "archetypal Mitchell", and according to Digital Spy, his arrival will "shed new light on what made Ronnie and Roxy into the women they are and [...] provide some new insights into Peggy [Mitchell]'s history." Santer promised EastEnders' audience "stacks of excitement and drama" upon Archie's arrival.

Speaking of the casting of Lamb in the role, Santer commented: "Larry Lamb is an immensely talented, experienced and charismatic actor. [...] Barbara [Windsor], Rita [Simons], Sam [Janus] and I are very excited to be working with Larry." Lamb said: "I'm absolutely delighted to be joining the Mitchell clan and working with [...] Barbara Windsor and my new-found daughters Ronnie and Roxy. I can't wait to step into Archie's shoes – frankly, it's a badge of honour to join EastEnders. My roots are working class so becoming part of the Square feels right. It's like I've come full circle and am back where I started out." He also described Archie as "different [from Phil and Grant]. He's not [...] frightened to get involved, but he's become more worldly over the years. He's made a success of his life and he's learnt a lot on the way."

Archie is a love interest for Peggy, his brother's widow, despite reports that actress Barbara Windsor did not want any more romantic storylines. Windsor later commented that "she always thought Larry Lamb should star in the [...] soap" and that he is a "match made in heaven" for her.

The character was originally intended to stay on screen only for the duration of the Danielle Jones storyline, however, following the character's departure, it was confirmed he would return due to his popularity with viewers. Again, this appearance lasted for a single storyline, and Archie departed again at its conclusion. Archie returned in an attempt to win Peggy back. Lamb commented on his character's part in the storyline, saying "I do know this dream family is a figment of his imagination. Archie thinks he will prevail, but that's because he's a psychopath!" In June 2010, Lamb revealed that he based Archie on his own father.

== Storylines ==
Archie Mitchell made his first appearance when he is visited at his home in Weymouth by his estranged daughter, Ronnie (Samantha Womack) - whom he has not seen for just over fifteen years - and sister-in-law, Peggy (Barbara Windsor); they are looking for his younger daughter, Roxy (Rita Simons), who has disappeared after discovering she is pregnant. Peggy knows that Roxy is staying with Archie in Dorset but does not tell Ronnie, worried that she will refuse to go. Ronnie is furious to see her father, wanting nothing to do with him. Archie and Peggy catch up and he tells her he has survived cancer. Ronnie had given birth at the age of 14 to a daughter, Amy, fathered by Joel Reynolds (Cavan Clerkin), but Archie had Amy immediately put up for adoption. Archie then fabricates a story that the child had died 13 years ago, though Ronnie does not believe him. Roxy agrees to return to London if Ronnie and Archie make up, but Ronnie whispers in her father's ear that she will kiss his gravestone when he is dead. Archie persuades Peggy to start a relationship while they can and tells Ronnie he will see her in London in a few weeks.

Now engaged, Archie and Peggy return to The Queen Victoria public house. Ronnie tries to tell the family that Archie is evil, but only succeeds in turning them against her. At a family meal, Archie impresses Peggy when he helps her son Phil (Steve McFadden) mediate his relationship with his son Ben (Charlie Jones) - after Phil ends up revealing that his father, Eric (George Russo), had previously abused him back when he was a child; Archie calms Phil down by telling him of his own abuse at the hands of his own father, which also impacted Eric, and that Eric loved another woman. While happy to have Archie part of the family, Peggy realizes she needs to question his motives and tests him by sending texts from a mobile phone that belonged to Phil's girlfriend - Suzy Branning (Maggie O'Neill). When Archie learns about this, he postpones the wedding and considers ending his relationship with Peggy; however, they later reorganize the preparations after she accepts his proposal.

Archie soon begins controlling his daughters by persuading Ronnie's employee, Danielle Jones (Lauren Crace), to steal a letter from Joel that he later burns in front of Ronnie. Archie is still unhappy that his younger daughter Roxy is married to Sean Slater (Robert Kazinsky) – he feels that Sean is not good enough for Roxy. He causes trouble by manipulating both of them and stops Sean being there when Roxy prematurely gives birth to her daughter, Amy, by deliberately failing to phone him when Roxy goes into labour. He also controls Peggy, changing how she dresses and distancing her from her friends.

Worried about her daughter's paternity, Roxy has a DNA test done and Archie finds the results, discovering that Amy's father is actually Suzy's brother Jack Branning (Scott Maslen) - whom Ronnie has already embarked on a relationship with. After catching Suzy stealing from the Mitchells' safe, Archie tells her he will keep quiet providing she makes sure Sean finds the DNA test results, proving that he is not the father. This act leads to Sean kidnapping Amy, and trying to drown her, Roxy and himself, before he is stopped by Ronnie and Jack. Afterwards, Sean flees - his marriage to Roxy ruined. The discovery also leads to a huge falling out between Ronnie and Roxy, and between her and Jack, but they later reconcile.

Archie realizes that Danielle is Ronnie's daughter when he sees her locket and recognizes it as the one Ronnie gave her baby before giving her up for adoption. Danielle admits to him that she came to Walford to find Ronnie, get to know her, and tell her who she was - only Ronnie has ended up rejecting her and she cannot get close to anyone; with Ronnie secretly feeling guilty for giving Danielle away. Archie realizes that he will be disowned from the family when they find out he lied to Ronnie about her daughter, so he tells her that Ronnie has depression and to let him tell her that Danielle is her daughter when the time is right - wanting to protect himself from Ronnie finding out about his lies. He tells Danielle that he will tell Ronnie, but later contemplates strangling her. Unable to go through with it, he leaves Danielle heartbroken by telling her that Ronnie knows and had decided that she wants nothing to do with her - going as far as to get Archie to pay Danielle in leaving Walford for good. On his wedding day, Archie is angered by Peggy's decision not to wear the suit he chose for her. When challenged by Peggy at the altar, he decides he loves her regardless and the ceremony proceeds. At the reception, Ronnie sees Danielle about to snatch Amy and she tells her the truth. Danielle realizes Archie has lied to her, but Archie claims Danielle is mentally ill. Danielle tries to prove herself but Ronnie believes Archie and throws Danielle out. However, she later finds the locket upon toasting her father's marriage to Peggy - which causes Ronnie to realize that Danielle was telling the truth and that Archie had in fact been lying to both of them. Ronnie quickly goes to find Danielle, ignoring her father's efforts to stop her as she is disgusted by his lies. In response, Archie insists that her chance to get Danielle back is meaningless and that it will not affect his marriage to Peggy - not realizing that Peggy herself is right behind him, overhearing Archie dismissing Ronnie's claims about him. Once he turns to face his wife, Peggy realizes that Ronnie was telling the truth about Archie all along. Equally disgusted by his lies, she screams at their guests to leave and confronts Archie for his deceit. Her family and Jack are stunned by the news that Danielle is Ronnie's daughter, and that Archie is as evil as Ronnie always claimed. As Archie desperately defends his actions in front of Peggy and their ashamed family, Ronnie rushes to find and reconcile with Danielle. However, she ends up witnessing Danielle being struck by Peggy's stepdaughter Janine Butcher (Charlie Brooks) in her car; Danielle dies in her long-lost mother's arms, leaving Ronnie broken-hearted as Archie had robbed her of a life with her daughter. After Ronnie prevents her father from visiting Danielle at the morgue and then attending her funeral, Archie is thrown out of The Queen Vic and disowned by his family - with Roxy also turning on her father for ruining her sister's life. Peggy, wanting justice for Ronnie and Danielle, orders Phil to kill Archie - so he kidnaps him and threatens to bury him in cement. Archie falls for the blackmail and begs for his life, offering Phil money. However, the cement mixer only contains water. Phil tells Archie to leave, saying if he returns, he will be killed for real.

Archie soon returns on 10 July 2009, seeking to reclaim Peggy and reconcile with Roxy. He is revealed to have bought Suzy's old house on the Square, and refuses to leave at his family's insistence. Archie asks Roxy to pass on a gift to Ronnie: the baby blanket she bought for her daughter when she was born. Peggy eventually agrees to talk to Archie and believes he is sorry for his past actions. Phil sees him and breaks into his house with a gun, but sees him and Peggy kissing. Peggy tells Phil that Archie has changed, but Phil tells Archie to stay away from his family and drops a bullet into his glass. Phil later tells Archie he's going to kill him, but is stopped by Ben at the last moment. After returning from her holiday, Peggy refuses to recoup her broken marriage with Archie.

Roxy invites everyone to Archie's housewarming party, but Ronnie organises a party at The Queen Vic - so nobody turns up. Janine tells Ronnie that Archie paid her to spy on her and Roxy, prompting Ronnie to tell her sister about this. In response, Roxy - furious with her father - moves out. Archie later buys the car lot from Jack, upsetting Ronnie further. Danielle's biological father, Joel, comes to Walford and he and Ronnie rekindle their relationship. This irritates Archie, who later bribes Joel to leave Walford and never return. Joel refuses, saying he can stand up to him now. Archie then resorts to blackmail by proclaiming knowledge of his family. Joel leaves in response, but later returns at Ronnie's request. She later tells her father that Joel is back and there is nothing he can do about it.

At some point, Archie discovers that Peggy's daughter Sam (Danniella Westbrook) is back in Walford - having returned from Brazil despite being on the run for covering up the murder of the Queen Vic's original landlord and Phil's old enemy, Den Watts (Leslie Grantham). He soon observes a feud between Sam and Roxy, as the pair have never got on properly; with Roxy growing frustrated to learn that Sam's return has been kept from her. Archie later sees Roxy in the Square, following a row, and she tells him. He also learns of Sam's engagement to Janine's brother Ricky (Sid Owen) and gives them a gift - which they decline. When Sam is arrested, Archie puts up her bail money on the condition he can have his family back. He and Peggy celebrate, but their children return the money and their cousin Billy (Perry Fenwick) makes it clear to Archie that his family - including Peggy - still do not trust him. Outraged, Archie vows to get revenge on his family by taking The Queen Vic from them. He forms a partnership with Janine to carry out his scheme. He first plans to burn the pub down and frame Billy for the incident, but Peggy discovers this - though Archie is able to convince her that he was not involved and they kiss briefly. Archie later causes his family to lose the bail money for Sam by convincing her to abscond the country. This prompts Phil to borrow money from a loan shark named Isaacs, who later assaults him for not meeting the repayments; in response, Phil gets a loan from his stepson Ian Beale (Adam Woodyatt) - which is secured on The Queen Vic, thereby meaning that ownership of the pub would pass to Ian if Phil does not repay him in two weeks. Archie uses this opportunity to try and secure the Queen Vic by convincing Ian to sell the debt to him, but Ian refuses. Janine carries out Archie's scheme by seducing Ian, and recording them having sex. She then blackmails him into selling the debt to Archie, whom she claims to be in a relationship with; Ian is forced to agree when he fears the pair will expose the recording to his wife Jane (Laurie Brett) and threaten Ben should the latter get involved. Archie later proposes to Janine for her efforts, and she accepts. Billy soon discovers Archie's plot upon hearing him and Janine talking about their engagement. After discovering that Billy had overheard their plans, they convince Billy to let them make him an offer so he could be on their side; Billy reluctantly agrees when they persuade his ex-wife Honey (Emma Barton) to bring their children over for Christmas and New Year to spend time with their father.

When Archie and Peggy's divorce papers come through, Archie tells Peggy that he still loves her and wants her back. Peggy's employee and Janine's flatmate Ryan Malloy (Neil McDermott) soon overhears them, prompting him to inform Janine about it. Janine then shows her engagement ring to Peggy, who recognizes it as the same ring that belonged to Archie's mother. Upon realizing that she had been manipulated again, Peggy confronts Archie and signs the divorce papers and the Mitchells celebrate in the pub. However, their celebrations are cut short when Ryan alerts them to the fact that Archie and Janine are behind the bar. Their scheme is soon unraveled when Archie tells his family that the deadline has been overdue, and that Ian has already sold them the debt that basically grants Archie ownership of the pub. The Mitchells are outraged, but try to carry on as normal - prompting Archie to replace Peggy's name as licensee with his own; Archie then makes his ownership of the Queen Vic clear by telling his family that they are trespassing on his property. Ronnie later confronts and stands up to her father, which provokes Archie into slamming her into the bar. Roxy angrily tells him that Ronnie is pregnant, but the damage is done and Ronnie later miscarries. Peggy tells Archie that he killed another of Ronnie's children and warns him to stay away from her, but later invites him and Janine to The Queen Vic during a Christmas Eve party and gives them the keys; Archie and Janine celebrate as his family move out of the pub in defeat, though not before Phil warns Archie that he will be coming for him.

On Christmas Day 2009, Archie tells Ian he will give the CD to Jane - despite Ian's compliance. Archie later convinces Janine to skip Christmas dinner as he has a surprise treasure hunt for her. She eventually finds an envelope containing a one-way ticket to Gdańsk in Poland, and discovers that Archie has packed a bag for her to move out of the Queen Vic. Archie tells Janine that he is aware that she had been planning to defraud him in a conspiracy with Ryan, before taunting her with the fact that she is the reason why her father Frank (Mike Reid) always ran away and tells here that if she was his daughter he'd have run away too. He then proceeds to evict Janine out of the pub, leaving her upset and seething. Shortly afterwards, Archie is visited by a number of people whom he had antagonized throughout the year. Jack is the first to confront Archie, threatening to kill him if he hurts Ronnie again. At the same time, Ian breaks into the pub to extract the CD. Archie later catches him out and plans on calling the police. When Ian pleads for Archie to not get the police involved, Archie tells him that the CD containing his one-night stand with Janine does not exist but that there is a file on his laptop - which he then reveals he can make copies of anytime he likes. Archie then chucks Ian out of the pub and tells him that Jane will receive a phone call in half an hour when she will here some of Ian and Janine's dalliances, prompting Ian to tell Archie that he will wish he was dead should Jane find out from him about the secret. Ian then storms off as Archie gleefully watches. Sam tries to confront Archie but he shuts the door on her. Ronnie visits her father, telling Archie that he will not make her care for him anymore. Archie argues with Ronnie about the way he treated her, explaining that his father had never once smiled at him during childhood. Unmoved by her father's story, Ronnie tells Archie that she would be glad if he were to die right now. Archie throws her out, reminding her of the exact spot she pushed Danielle onto the night she died. Shortly afterwards, he starts drinking until Peggy visits him. Archie lets her in the pub, and she delivers an ultimatum; either Archie leaves the pub tonight, or he will regret all the evil things he had done to their family. Peggy further states that she is not just some sweet, little old lady and that Archie has no idea who he is messing with. Archie responds by telling Peggy to spend Christmas Night in bed together, otherwise he will have the pub converted to flats - leaving Peggy horrified. She leaves the pub distraught, though not before Archie emotionally tells her that he will be waiting for her to return the moment she leaves. Later on, Jack's nephew Bradley (Charlie Clements) visits Archie and punches him - hurting his fist and loosening one of Archie's teeth. Bradley warns him to stay away from his fiancee and Danielle's best-friend Stacey Slater (Lacey Turner); a couple of months ago, Archie raped Stacey and became the reason why she ended up getting sectioned in the first place. Once Bradley has left the pub, Archie picks up the snowglobe from the floor and shakes it around. As he does this, Archie does not notice the bust of the Queen Vic being pushed from the bar and coming straight towards him. Archie is struck on the head by the falling bust, and is left fatally injured. Moments later, his daughters find him - with Roxy arriving in the pub to see Ronnie crouching down behind their dying father. Archie then dies of the head injury, but not before blurting out "Veronica, I'm sorry." His body is taken away the next day, despite all he has done Roxy is left devastated by his death.

Archie's will is read, revealing that he has left:

- Billy, his "stool" and place at the end of the bar in The Queen Vic, as a place for him where he cannot be thrown out;
- Peggy, a silver framed photo of their wedding;
- Amy, and Ronnie's "first surviving child", the sum of £100,000 each to be held in trust until their 21st birthdays. Ronnie is unhappy, seeing this as Archie controlling her from beyond the grave, but is not allowed to decline legally;
- Phil, his father's "real" boxing trophy, which they had a fight about earlier regarding Archie giving fake ones;
- Roxy, his antique fountain pen which she always wanted as a child, as well as the residue of his estate, including his mother's antique diamond engagement ring, his house (27 Albert Square), Maserati sports car, The Car Lot a.k.a. Mitchell's Executive Motors (6 Albert Square), The Queen Victoria (46 Albert Square) and £3 million;
- Ronnie, his signet ring (as well as a note regarding him expecting her to not take any substantial gifts from him);
- Janine (who played the game better than anyone he ever knew), his Newton's cradle, "in the sure and certain knowledge that it will drive her absolutely nuts."

A pathologist's report shows that Archie had terminal cancer and only had weeks to live anyway. Peggy confesses to DCI Jill Marsden (Sophie Stanton) her regrets that she did not believe Archie when he had told her he was dying from cancer. On 19 February 2010, the killer is revealed to be Stacey - just moments after Bradley died while trying to evade police capture due to him being implicated as the killer; Bradley would later be posthumously found guilty of murder. Prior to Bradley's death, Ronnie learns that Archie raped Stacey, who is pregnant and believes that the baby is Archie's. Ronnie tells Stacey that Archie cannot be the father because he had chemotherapy several years earlier that had left him infertile. Ronnie tells Roxy about Archie raping Stacey when the two siblings have an argument over their father's murder. When Roxy asks her sister how she could be sure that Archie raped Stacey in the first place, Ronnie admits that their father had also raped her as a child.

Months later, Ronnie recaps on her rape ordeal with Archie after walking into Roxy and their mother Glenda (Glynis Barber) watching old videos of them together with Archie. She soon explains to Roxy how Archie sexually molested her back when she was 13, how he raped Ronnie on many occasions, and how he intended to do the same to Roxy had Ronnie never resolved to be in the same room as her sister - to protect her from the same fate that their father had put her through. At first both Roxy and Peggy refuse to believe this, but they realise that Archie had indeed raped Ronnie upon finding out that Glenda knew about it without telling anyone in the first place.

Eventually, the Mitchells and their neighbors all learn from Janine that Stacey was the one who killed Archie. The police are promptly called in to arrest Stacey, but Ronnie - knowing that Stacey has suffered just as she did through Archie's evil deeds - allows her to leave the square; Stacey manages to flee the country, though her mother Jean (Gillian Wright) is left devastated by this and she blames Archie for Stacey's departure. In 2014, Stacey returns to Walford and ends up confessing to the police that she killed Archie - in order to clear Bradley's name. She is sentenced to five years in prison, but later appeals the sentence on her mother's urging; Stacey is soon released due to her bipolar disorder, thus appearing to have put her ordeal with Archie to rest for good.

In 2019, while Stacey's old friend Ruby Allen (Louisa Lytton) tries to find some closure after being raped, she learns what Archie did to Stacey and they visit his grave together - with Ruby convincing Stacey to get the closure she needs in order to move forward with her life. Stacey does so by telling Archie off for his actions against her and ruining her life, before concludingly telling him he cannot hurt her anymore - nor does he deserve any sympathy from her or anybody else.

== Reception ==
After Lamb joined the cast, Diederick Santer commented "I've only seen a handful of scenes that Larry's done so far but I think he's giving a mesmerising and multi-layered performance. There's quite a buzz coming up from the set, and I'm really excited about him." Tim Teeman, critic for The Times, has described Archie as "a thousand times more terrifying than Nick Cotton" and "a psycho in a golf jersey." The Christmas Day episode in which Archie was killed attracted 10.9 million viewers. In February 2025, Radio Times ranked Archie as the 2nd best EastEnders villain, with Laura Denby writing: "Lamb perfectly embodied his hateful alter ego, and it's a testament to his talents that this role coincided with fellow BBC character Mick Shipman, loveable patriarch from Gavin & Stacey".

== See also ==
- Who Killed Archie?
- The Secret Mitchell
- List of soap opera villains
