= Mitchell family =

Fictional family from EastEnders

- EastEnders family
- First appearance: Episode 526; 20 February 1990
- Introduced by: Michael Ferguson
- Duration: 1990–present

The Mitchell family is a fictional family in the UK soap opera EastEnders. They were first introduced in February 1990, when brothers Phil (Steve McFadden) and Grant Mitchell (Ross Kemp) bought the local garage, the Arches. Their sister Sam (Danniella Westbrook/Kim Medcalf) was introduced later in 1990, and their mother Peggy (Jo Warne) shortly after in 1991, before being reintroduced as a regular character in 1994, with the role recast to Barbara Windsor. Since then, the family has been significantly expanded to include both the immediate and extended families. Phil has been the longest running Mitchell on the show, and the family has expanded significantly in the years since, remaining a large presence on the square.

The Mitchells have mostly been associated with the ownership of local pub The Queen Victoria; Peggy was periodically its landlady between 1995 and 2010. They have also been known for their thuggish ways and their tendency to break the law, most notably Phil and Grant, who have sometimes been compared to the Kray twins. The Mitchells have been in several of the show's memorable storylines, such as: their rivalry with the Watts family, and the "Sharongate", "Who Shot Phil?", the murder of their rival Den Watts which coincided with the show's 20th anniversary episode, "Get Johnny Week", "The Secret Mitchell", "Who Killed Archie?", and "Who Killed Lucy Beale?" scenarios. In 2010, EastEnders celebrated Windsor's exit from the soap with "Queen Vic Fire Week", in which a fire engulfs the long-standing pub and risks the lives of Walford regulars, including Peggy and Phil. In 2016, Windsor, Kemp, and Westbrook briefly reprised their roles as part of a major story line that follows Phil's ongoing battle with alcoholism and ends with Peggy's suicide due to terminal cancer. Throughout their time on the show, the Mitchells make several references to their late patriarch Eric (George Russo), who first appeared in 2022 during a flashback episode to 1979 and served as a recurring impact for most of the family members, especially Phil and Peggy. The flashback episode also introduced Billy's father Stephen (Dean Roberts/Alan Ford) and brother Charlie (Charlie Heptinstall); Charlie's son Jamie (Jack Ryder) becomes a ward of Billy and later is killed off on Christmas Day 2002.

As of 2026, a total of eleven Mitchell blood relatives appear on the programme: Phil; his sons Raymond Dawkins and Albie Watts; Ben's daughter Lexi Pearce (Isabella Brown),Ricky (Frankie Day) and his daughter Charli Slater; Roxy's daughter Amy (Ellie Dadd); Phil's cousin Billy (Perry Fenwick); Billy's children Janet (Grace) and Will (Freddie Phillips); and Harry (Elijah Holloway) and Barney (Lewis Bridgeman). There are others that have married into the family such as Phil's ex-wives Kat Slater (Jessie Wallace), Sharon Watts (Letitia Dean) and Kathy Beale (Gillian Taylforth); Billy's wife Honey Mitchell (Emma Barton); Teddy's ex-wife Nicola Mitchell (Laura Doddington); and Ben's husband Callum Highway (Tony Clay).

== Storylines ==
Following the Mitchells' arrival in 1990, Phil starts an affair with Grant's wife, Sharon Watts, in 1992 ("Sharongate"). Samantha "Sam" Mitchell (Danniella Westbrook) stays with her brothers to escape overbearing Peggy. Their father Eric had died five years earlier.

After the affair is discovered in October 1994, Sharon and Grant divorce, and Grant and Phil's mother Peggy is introduced as the new landlady of the Queen Vic, replacing Sharon, who had lived in the pub all her life, but leaves Walford to live in America with her mother.

In 1993, Phil marries Romanian immigrant Nadia Borovac (Anna Barkan) to let her stay in the country, but starts a relationship with Kathy Beale (Gillian Taylforth) at the same time. In order to marry her, Phil divorces Nadia, and he and Kathy marry in 1995. Their son, Ben, is born in 1996, but he contracts meningitis, which leaves him partially deaf. Whilst in France, Phil confesses to Kathy that he has slept with Lorna Cartwright (Janet Dibley), and they divorce in 1999. Kathy emigrates to South Africa with Ben in 1998.

Grant marries Tiffany Raymond (Martine McCutcheon) in 1996, and they have a daughter, Courtney, who is born in early 1997. After a problematic marriage, Tiffany is killed in a hit-and-run accident. Peggy marries Frank Butcher (Mike Reid) in 1999, but they divorce two years later due to Frank having an affair with Peggy's best friend and Frank's ex-wife Pat Evans (Pam St Clement). Soon enough Grant leaves in October 1999 to start a new life in Brazil with Courtney.

The extended Mitchell family is introduced in 1998; Jamie Mitchell (Jack Ryder) is taken in by Phil as he flees from his abusive guardian and uncle, Billy Mitchell (Perry Fenwick). Billy, Phil and Grant's cousin, moves to Walford as well, and becomes a lackey for the Mitchell brothers and their schemes. Jamie is killed off in December 2002, while Billy remains a regular after being reformed.

In the spring of 2001, Phil is at the center of the Who Shot Phil? story line. Phil had become a darker and more menacing character during the previous year, and five characters are suspected of being the culprit, who is revealed to be his ex-girlfriend Lisa Shaw (Lucy Benjamin). It is then Lisa gets pregnant with Phil's child, Louise. Lisa later takes Louise and emigrates to Portugal after her marriage to Mark Fowler (Todd Carty) ends. Phil follows her and returns with Louise in October 2002. Lisa is reported missing, which causes the police to suspect Phil of murdering her. Kate Morton (Jill Halfpenny), Phil's third wife, betrays her job as an undercover cop due to her feelings for Phil. He marries her in 2003 but Lisa returns on their wedding day, scheming to kill Phil despite her appearance as a reformed character. After convincing Lisa not to kill Phil, Den Watts (Leslie Grantham) helps her take her revenge by setting Phil up for armed robbery, and he is arrested in 2003. He escapes prison and goes on the run from the police for over a year.

Following Phil's departure, Sam (now Kim Medcalf) takes control of the Mitchell empire, and a feud forms between Sam and the remaining Mitchells against Den Watts and his family in 2004. The Mitchell empire falls when Den blackmails their old friend of the family, Marcus Christie (Stephen Churchett), into scamming them of all their assets. Den is murdered in 2005, but Sam witnesses the death and keeps it secret for several months. When Den's killer, his estranged wife Chrissie (Tracy-Ann Oberman), begins manipulating everyone into thinking Sam was insane, Sam digs up Den's body from the Vic cellar to try to expose Chrissie, only to be arrested for the murder herself. Phil and Grant return from Brazil to clear her name, and she follows them back to Brazil once that happens.

The Mitchell brothers return in October 2005 and become a dominating force in Walford, quick to avenge any misdoings towards them.

When Kathy fakes her death in early 2006 without anyone's knowledge, a 10-year-old Ben (now Charlie Jones) comes to England to live with Phil. Phil gets engaged to Stella Crawford (Sophie Thompson), unaware that she was physically and mentally abusing Ben behind his back, which gets revealed on their wedding day. Stella commits suicide in the aftermath. The wedding introduces Phil's cousins, Ronnie (Samantha Womack) and Roxy Mitchell (Rita Simons), as wild and fun-loving sisters from Ibiza, who buy the local club, R&R. They are the daughter of Eric's brother, Archie (Larry Lamb), who is introduced in 2008, and has a good relationship with Roxy but a bad one with Ronnie; the reason behind the latter is that Archie had the baby Ronnie had as a teenager adopted out against her will. Archie and Peggy, once his sister-in-law, start a relationship soon after he moves to Walford.

Roxy and Ronnie's relationship becomes complicated when Roxy has a one-night stand with Ronnie's on-off boyfriend, Jack Branning (Scott Maslen), and gets pregnant, giving birth to a daughter that she names Amy Mitchell that November. Suzy Branning (Maggie O'Neill), Phil's latest girlfriend, reveals on Christmas Day 2008 that Roxy's husband, Sean Slater (Robert Kazinsky), is not Amy's father, resulting in their divorce. Billy marries Honey Edwards (Emma Barton), and have two children together: Janet, who has Down's Syndrome, and William. Billy and Honey divorce several years later, and Honey moves away with the children.

Danielle Jones (Lauren Crace) arrives in the square in 2008, and is soon revealed to be the daughter Ronnie gave up for adoption many years earlier. Danielle keeps her identity a secret ("The Secret Mitchell"), until it is discovered by Archie. He manipulates her into thinking that Ronnie hated her and would reject her if she knew who she is. Archie and Peggy become engaged, and at the wedding reception Danielle reveals her true identity to Ronnie, who refuses to believe her, as Archie had stolen the locket that would have been proof to what Danielle was saying. However, Ronnie discovers the locket in her wine glass, and heads off to reunite with her daughter, who is killed by Janine Butcher's (Charlie Brooks) speeding car.

Sam (played by Danniella Westbrook again) returns in 2009. The Mitchells bail her out, but when she flees Walford a few months later, they lose their bail money, which cause them to go bankrupt. Archie and his new girlfriend, Janine, prey on their vulnerability and take over the Queen Vic pub. On Christmas Day 2009, Archie is murdered by an unknown assailant ("Who Killed Archie?"). Phil, Peggy, Sam, Ronnie, and Billy are all suspects in the murder, but in the following February Stacey Branning (Lacey Turner) is revealed to be the murderer.

Following Archie's death, Ronnie and Roxy's mother, Glenda (Glynis Barber) is introduced, having come to reunite with her girls after leaving them as teenagers due to the breakdown of her and Archie's marriage. Sam returns, is promptly arrested, and is sent to prison for her part in Den's murder. Louise is reintroduced when Lisa abandons her on Phil's doorstep. she is abused by Ben, who is still scarred by Stella's abuse. He is sent to juvenile detention when he attacks Jordan Johnson (Michael-Joel David Stuart). The stress of these events cause Phil to become addicted to cocaine, ending his long-term relationship with Shirley Carter (Linda Henry). Peggy takes Louise back to live with Lisa, which ruins her relationship with Phil. Determined to help her son break his addiction, she locks Phil in the Queen Vic, but he escapes and sets the pub on fire. Phil nearly dies and Peggy is devastated when the pub burns down ("Queen Vic Fire Week"). Realising how her controlling behaviour made Phil the way he is, Peggy leaves Walford and hands the pub over to Phil. He rents it out to Alfie (Shane Richie) and Kat Moon (Jessie Wallace).

Sam returns to Walford in late 2010 and reveals that she is pregnant; she initially lies and says that the child is Ricky Butcher's (Sid Owen) to try to reconcile with him, but Ronnie exposes that the baby is the son of her now fiancé Jack Branning: Ronnie and Jack married in November 2010 and Ronnie gave birth to their son James in late December. However, days after he was born he died of sudden infant death syndrome, and she swaps her dead child with Kat and Alfie's newborn son. She does not reveal her actions until April 2011; the storyline was initially intended to continue for a longer period of time, but the baby-swap storyline was brought to an early end due to a public outcry. Ronnie is sent to prison in June 2011.

Phil has an affair with Glenda behind Shirley's back. In January 2011, he has a heart attack, and asks Shirley to marry him, but on their wedding day he calls it off. Glenda leaves Walford after having been rejected by Ronnie and Roxy for her actions. Ben (now Joshua Pascoe) is released from prison in September, and began to stalk Phil when the latter refuses to accept that he is gay, sending him threatening notes for several months. Billy's granddaughter Lola Pearce (Danielle Harold) is introduced as a new teenage troublemaker, and is impregnated by Ben, her distant relative, when they test his sexuality.

Ben's stalking is revealed when D.C.I. Jill Marsden (Sophie Stanton) returns to arrest him and accuses him of murdering Stella Crawford after her abuse is exposed. Phil is sent to prison, but found not guilty. Ben panics about his father's return, and kills Shirley's best friend Heather Trott (Cheryl Fergison) while arguing with her. Phil covers up the death, despite Shirley's devastation at her friend's death. Ben's crime is exposed several months later and he is sent to prison, while Shirley ends her relationship with Phil.

Lola is accused of not being able to care for her baby, Lexi, and Phil takes custody of her when he finds out she is Ben's daughter. Phil forms an attachment to Lexi following Ben's arrest and double-crosses Lola, pretending to help her regain custody of Lexi while really wanting to keep Lexi himself. He eventually hands Lexi back.

Sharon, now Sharon Rickman, returns in 2012 and begins a relationship with Phil after her engagement to Jack fails. Ronnie is released from prison in 2013. Billy resumes custody of Janet in 2014 when Honey moves to Canada with William. Roxy briefly marries Alfie, but their marriage is annulled when she realises on their wedding day that he is still in love with Kat. In the aftermath of her rejection, Roxy enters into a relationship with Carl White (Daniel Coonan), who has a troubled relationship with Phil, after sending him to the hospital earlier in the year as part of his plan to put Max Branning (Jake Wood) in prison. Ronnie tries to warn Roxy about Carl, but he attacks her, being killed by her in self-defence when he threatens to rape her. She disposes of the body and tells Phil what she did. Phil sells the Queen Vic to Mick Carter (Danny Dyer), unaware that he is Shirley's brother. Phil and Sharon become engaged when she is badly injured in an attack on Phil's bar, The Albert, which she runs. Phil was behind the attack, and wanted to scare Sharon into becoming more reliant on him, and he proposes out of guilt. Ronnie discovers she is pregnant and leaves Walford.

Ben (now Harry Reid) returns for the wedding, along with Ronnie, who is sent by Peggy to stop the proceedings. She fails and Phil and Sharon marry. Their marriage is rocky; Kathy is revealed to have faked her death and returns, while her husband Gavin Sullivan (Paul Nicholas) makes Phil become addicted to alcohol again. Billy reunites with Honey when she returns from Canada, and Roxy leaves for a while to get over her attempted rape by Dean Wicks (Matt Di Angelo). Ronnie briefly marries Charlie Cotton (Declan Bennett), the father of her newborn son Matthew Mitchell-Cotton. She also discovers that Vincent Hubbard (Richard Blackwood) is a police informant working to take down the Mitchells, but she and Phil take him down. In his drunken downward spiral, Phil drunkenly causes a car crash which hospilatises Sharon's young son Denny. An enranged Sharon subsequently leaves Phil, who is told he had months to live due to cirrhosis. Phil then tracks down his daughter Louise (now Tilly Keeper) to right wrongs, and learns that Peggy is also dying from a relapse of breast cancer. Phil finds Louise, only to be rushed to a hospital shortly after. Phil's drinking worsens, and he destroys the car lot that leads to Louise nearly losing her life. In 2016, Peggy commits suicide rather than face a slow death from cancer; Grant discovers he has a son with Michelle Fowler (Jenna Russell), named Mark (Ned Porteous); and Phil remains sober for long enough to receive a liver transplant.

In 2017, Ronnie remarries Jack, but on the wedding night, she and Roxy drown in a hotel swimming pool. In April 2022, Sam (played by Kim Medcalf again) resurfaces to Walford. In January 2023, Sam's twelve-year-old son Ricky (Frankie Day) has a one-night stand with Stacey Slater (Lacey Turner)'s twelve-year-old daughter Lily (Lillia Turner) resulting in Lily's pregnancy.

== Family members ==
- Edward Mitchell (deceased); married to Betty Mitchell (deceased)
  - Phillip Mitchell (deceased); married to Sandra Mitchell (deceased)
    - Eric Mitchell (deceased); married to Peggy Martin (deceased)
      - Phil Mitchell, son of Eric and Peggy, married to Nadia Borovac, Kathy Beale, Kate Morton, Sharon Rickman and Kat Slater
        - Ben Mitchell, son of Phil and Kathy Beale, married to Callum Highway
          - Lexi Pearce, daughter of Ben and Lola Pearce (deceased)
        - Louise Mitchell, daughter of Phil and Lisa Fowler
          - Peggy Taylor, daughter of Louise and Keanu Taylor (deceased)
        - Dennis Rickman, son of Sharon and Dennis Rickman (deceased), adopted by Phil during his marriage to Sharon
        - Raymond Dawkins, son of Phil and Denise Fox
        - Albie Watts, son of Phil and Sharon
      - Grant Mitchell, son of Eric and Peggy, married to Sharon Watts, Tiffany Raymond (deceased) and Carla Mitchell
        - Mark Fowler, son of Grant and Michelle Fowler
        - Courtney Mitchell, daughter of Grant and Tiffany
      - Sam Mitchell, daughter of Eric and Peggy, married to Ricky Butcher and Andy Hunter (deceased)
        - Ricky Branning, son of Sam and Jack Branning
          - Charli Slater, daughter of Ricky and Lily Slater
    - Archie Mitchell (deceased), married to Glenda Mitchell and Peggy Mitchell
      - Ronnie Mitchell (deceased), daughter of Archie and Glenda, married to Jack Branning and Charlie Cotton
        - Danielle Jones (deceased), daughter of Ronnie and Joel Reynolds (deceased)
        - James Branning (deceased), son of Ronnie and Jack Branning
        - Matthew Mitchell Cotton, son of Ronnie and Charlie
      - Roxy Mitchell (deceased), daughter of Archie and Glenda; married to Sean Slater and Alfie Moon
        - Amy Mitchell, daughter of Roxy and Jack Branning
      - Danny Mitchell, son of Glenda and stepson of Archie
    - Clive Mitchell; married to Elaine Mitchell
  - Kenneth Mitchell; married to Barbara Mitchell
    - Ted Mitchell; married to Vie Mitchell
    - Stevie Mitchell; married to Val Mitchell (deceased) and Connie Mitchell (deceased)
      - Charlie Mitchell (deceased), son of Stevie and Val; married to Lynne Mitchell (deceased)
        - Jamie Mitchell (deceased)
      - Billy Mitchell, son of Stevie and Val, married to Little Mo Morgan and Honey Edwards
        - Dan Pearce (deceased), son of Billy and Julie Perkins
          - Lola Pearce (deceased), daughter of Dan and Emma Harding, married to Jay Brown
            - Lexi Pearce, daughter of Lola and Ben Mitchell
        - Janet Mitchell, daughter of Billy and Honey
        - Will Mitchell, son of Billy and Honey
      - Teddy Mitchell, son of Stevie and Connie, married to Nicola Hawkins
        - Harry Mitchell, son of Teddy and Nicola
          - Ethan Branning-Panesar, son of Harry and Penny Branning
        - Barney Mitchell, son of Zack Hudson and Nicola, legal son of Teddy
    - Renee Mitchell
  - Madge Mitchell

Peggy Mitchell's sister, Sal, occasionally appears but is not a blood relation to the main Mitchell family. Tucker Mitchell was referenced at Sal's funeral in 2024.

== Reception ==
The Mitchells won the Best Family accolade at the 2006 Inside Soap Awards. They received a nomination in the same category at the 2009 ceremony.

In 2019, Rebecca Koncienzcy of the Liverpool Echo called the Mitchells "one of the soap's most iconic families", and said: "The Mitchells have dominated storylines in the award-winning soap for decades and show no sign of stopping with the Sharon's affair with Keanu set to explode this Christmas."

The Mitchell family was longlisted for "Best Family" for the 2023 Inside Soap Awards.

== See also ==
- Get Johnny Week
