= Danielle Jones (EastEnders) =

Fictional character from EastEnders

- EastEnders character
- Portrayed by: Lauren Crace
- Duration: 2008–2009
- First appearance: Episode 3631; 18 August 2008
- Last appearance: Episode 3765; 3 April 2009
- Introduced by: Diederick Santer
In-universe information
- Other names: Amy Mitchell-Reynolds (birth name)
- Occupation: Market trader Cleaner
- Family: Mitchell
- Father: Joel Reynolds
- Mother: Ronnie Mitchell
- Adoptive father: Andy Jones
- Adoptive mother: Lizzie Jones
- Brothers: Andy Flynn (adoptive)
- Half-brothers: James Branning; Matthew Mitchell Cotton
- Half-sisters: Hannah Reynolds; Annabelle Reynolds; Molly Reynolds
- Grandfathers: Archie Mitchell
- Grandmothers: Glenda Mitchell
- Uncles: Danny Mitchell; Tim Reynolds
- Aunts: Roxy Mitchell
- First cousins: Amy Mitchell
- Other relatives: Phil Mitchell; Ben Mitchell; Billy Mitchell

Danielle Jones is a fictional character from the BBC soap opera EastEnders, played by Lauren Crace. The character appeared between 18 August 2008 and 3 April 2009. Crace's casting in the role was announced in July 2008, when she was described as a love interest for fellow new character Callum Monks (Elliott Jordan). In October 2008, it was revealed that Danielle was actually the long-lost daughter of established character Ronnie Mitchell (Samantha Janus). Crace has disclosed that even she was unaware of this fact upon being cast in the role, but always knew Danielle would only have a short arc. Danielle's feelings were further explored in a segment of the BBC EastEnders homepage entitled Danielle's Diary, documenting the character's thoughts on the storylines she was involved in, while a special episode of EastEnders Revealed entitled "The Secret Mitchell" further explored the character's impact on the show.

Danielle played a small but pivotal role in multiple storylines on the show, which focused on her friendship with local resident Stacey Slater (Lacey Turner), her crush on Callum Monks (Elliott Jordan), her adoption secret and seeking to find answers about her missing mother in Albert Square. She was deemed a welcome addition to the soap by members of Telford and Wrekin Council for raising awareness of the town (Telford) the character originates from; however, she was poorly received by The Guardian's Gareth McLean and Grace Dent, and dubbed "Drippy Danielle" by the Daily Mirror's Jane Simon. Her final episode was watched by 11.46 million viewers, and caused a notable power surge on the National Grid.

== Creation and characterisation ==
Danielle was created as the long-lost daughter of established character Ronnie Mitchell (Samantha Janus), and a member of the soap's long-running Mitchell family. Her introduction had been planned from 2007, when story producer Dominic Treadwell-Collins conceived the idea of two new Mitchell sisters, Ronnie and Roxy. Ronnie was depicted as the more detached and icy sister, and a hidden secret was first alluded to eight months after their introduction, when Roxy made a veiled reference to Ronnie's child and a physical fight ensued. Several months later, off-set episodes shot in Weymouth and dubbed "Mitchell Week" by the BBC were aired, during which the audience were introduced to Ronnie and Roxy's father Archie, and learned that Ronnie had given a child up for adoption.

Treadwell-Collins explained that it was necessary to introduce Danielle shortly after this revelation, but in such a manner that she would arrive "under the audience's radar", to preserve the later revelation of her identity as Ronnie's daughter. Lauren Crace, then a third year student at the Royal Academy of Dramatic Art, was cast as Danielle and began filming in June 2008. EastEnders was Crace's first professional acting role, and executive producer Diederick Santer expressed his pleasure that Crace had chosen to make her debut on the show. Upon her introduction, EastEnders's producers attempted to deceive the audience into believing Danielle was nothing more than a new friend for Stacey. Crace herself was only told of Danielle's true identity after her successful audition, though as she only signed a six-month contract with the show, was always aware Danielle would only have a short arc. She stated that some audience members guessed Danielle to be Ronnie's daughter almost as soon as she arrived, and that she found maintaining the secret difficult.

Crace initially portrayed Danielle as being shy and afraid of rejection, though felt that Stacey's friendship and living with the Slater family could have a positive impact on her confidence. Discussing her failure at romantic relationships, Crace assessed that Danielle's eagerness may scare men off. She came to find portraying Danielle depressing, explaining that she was bored by and had doubts about Danielle's constant naivety and passive personality. She suggested to the producers that Danielle should stand up for herself more, which was accepted and adapted into her personality, to the point that by the end of her tenure on the show, Danielle was "not a little mouse any more". Crace's view is that Danielle's Mitchell heritage manifested itself in an inner-strength and ability to "come back fighting", giving her a toughness beneath her "wet and pathetic" personality.

== Development ==
Series writer Simon Ashdown explained that Danielle initially chose to conceal her identity from Ronnie due to her fear of being rejected. He described her as "hurt and broken by her life", and hoping to charm Ronnie into liking her before revealing the truth. Crace observed that Danielle was intrigued by Ronnie and the Mitchells, but also worried that she was too different from them and may be a disappointment to Ronnie. Danielle's pregnancy was used as a plot-device to bring the two closer together. Crace deemed the development "a huge thing" for Danielle, as contrary to her constant rejection, the one person she most desired support from was finally showing her affection. However, Ronnie's failure to attend Danielle's second clinic appointment signified "a step back" for the character, leaving her "hurt and distraught" and less willing to confide the truth in Ronnie than ever.

In the aftermath of her abortion, Danielle was depicted as being increasingly emotionally unstable and angry with Ronnie, believing that she deserved to belong to the Mitchell family. The writers had Archie discover her secret as a test of his character, experimenting with whether he would be despicable enough to conceal the truth. Lamb deemed Danielle "a huge threat" to Archie's position as patriarch of the Mitchell family, explaining why he chose to lie that Ronnie was suffering from depression and Danielle ought not tell her. Danielle accepted the lie, believing it to explain Ronnie's "hot and cold" reaction to her, and attempted to care for Ronnie and help her recover. Crace explained that despite their turbulent relationship, Ronnie was all Danielle had ever wanted. Despite seeing Archie as "a domineering figure", Danielle initially trusted him and believed he would reunite her with her mother when the time was right. However, as time passed she became aware of Archie's "true colours" and grew afraid of him.

The ultimate revelation of Danielle's identity was set at Archie's wedding to Peggy (Barbara Windsor), matriarch of the Mitchell family. Crace deemed the wedding "the perfect opportunity" for the storyline to conclude, and Santer explained: "Weddings are great because they bring the community together. A wedding gives you a stage, it gives you an event, the context to play things out, so it felt right that these big Mitchell stories would collide at Peggy's wedding." Writer James Payne concurred that setting the reveal at the wedding helped to make the moment "as dramatic and sensational" as it could possibly be. The episode saw Danielle announce that she was Ronnie's daughter in front of the entire wedding reception party, in what Crace has named her favourite scene on the show. She opined that the disbelief Danielle was faced with was "heartbreaking" and served to highlight the fact that "she came as the outsider and she still is the outsider because no one steps in to help her".

Danielle was killed off minutes after revealing her true identity to Ronnie, dying in her mother's arms. Although different outcomes to the storyline were considered, Santer explained that Danielle dying best preserved Ronnie's status as EastEnders' "tragic heroine character". Treadwell-Collins felt that to allow Ronnie to have her daughter, the "one thing that is key to her character" would serve to progressively weaken her character, and Santer agreed that while it may initially be touching, ultimately, the relationship would become boring. The scene in which Danielle dies was filmed during winter, but as it was set in early April, snow had to be cleared away from the set before filming could commence. A body double was used for the moment Danielle was run over. Although sad to leave, Crace felt that the story's conclusion was the right one, and was glad that Ronnie and Danielle finally shared a brief moment in the end, explaining: "It was so important that that tender moment was finally found, because that's all people wanted. It's all Danielle wanted, and it's all Ronnie wants." Crace concluded: "I think Danielle will leave quite a big mark on the Square and on the people in the Square – probably a bigger mark than she did when she was alive.

News of Danielle's death was subject to a media embargo, although several newspapers and magazines including the Radio Times leaked news of Crace's exit in advance of the event. Digital Spy's Kris Green reported that most of the online EastEnders community had anticipated the character's exit from the soap beforehand, some as early as January 2009.

== Storylines ==
Danielle arrives in Walford, having left her hometown of Telford and is befriended by local resident Stacey Slater (Lacey Turner), who gives her a job on her market clothing stall and offers her the spare room in her family's home. Danielle quickly develops a crush on fellow stall-trader Callum Monks (Elliott Jordan), who leads her on in an attempt to make Stacey jealous, but he helps her get a second job, cleaning at The Queen Victoria public house, where she gets caught in the feud between the pub's landlord Archie Mitchell (Larry Lamb) and his daughter Ronnie (Samantha Janus). Both try to use Danielle to get information from the other, with Archie persuading Danielle to steal Ronnie's post. Ronnie is furious when she realises, and sacks Danielle after publicly berating her. Danielle is devastated by this, and is later seen clutching a locket containing a photograph of Ronnie, revealing herself to be Ronnie's long-lost daughter, Amy.

It soon transpires that Danielle is the result of a teenage romance between Ronnie and her first boyfriend, Joel Reynolds. Archie disapproved of the pregnancy and put Danielle – named Amy by Ronnie — up for adoption. Danielle was adopted by Lizzie and Andy Jones (Aneirin Hughes). She began trying to locate her birth mother after Lizzie's death in 2007. Following Ronnie's tirade, Danielle tries to leave Albert Square, but Stacey and her family persuade her to stay with them.

In late 2008, Ronnie's sister Roxy (Rita Simons) gives birth to a baby girl who she names Amy, in honour of the child Ronnie thought she had lost, to Danielle's surprise. When Danielle falls out with Stacey and ends up squatting in a flat owned by next-door neighbour Ian Beale (Adam Woodyatt), Ronnie convinces him not to call the police.

Danielle later breaks down and tells Ronnie that she is pregnant by Paul, a barman she had a one-night stand with. She intended to tell him about her pregnancy until he revealed he has a girlfriend. Ronnie comforts Danielle and contacts Andy, suggesting that he take Danielle home but she resists in favor of staying close to Ronnie. She is dismayed when Ronnie confides in her that having her own child was the biggest mistake of her life. Danielle makes up with Stacey and decides to terminate her pregnancy. She is delighted when Ronnie accompanies her to the clinic but dismayed when she backs out of attending her second appointment. Following her abortion, Danielle visits her family for a while, but soon comes to miss Ronnie and Stacey; she then returns to Walford. Danielle becomes increasingly angry with Ronnie for rejecting her. She decides that she will tell Ronnie who she really is and leave Walford for good but Archie stops her when he learns who she is. Unknown to Danielle, Archie has told Ronnie that her daughter died as an infant, so in order to preserve his story, he convinces Danielle that Ronnie has depression and she should keep quiet until he decides the time is right to make her revelation. Although Danielle continues to press Archie to reveal the truth, he repeatedly puts her off to maintain his lie. Eventually, believing that Archie has told Ronnie about her, Danielle tells her the truth, but Ronnie refuses to believe her. Distraught, Danielle intends to leave Walford, but Ronnie discovers that Archie has been lying, and chases her. They are about to reconcile when Danielle is run over by a car driven by Janine Butcher (Charlie Brooks). A tearful Ronnie cradles Danielle and apologises for not believing her, saying that if she had known, she would never have given her up. Danielle passes away in Ronnie's arms as Roxy and Stacey watch on helplessly, leaving Ronnie devastated. Danielle is buried and a grief-stricken Ronnie sings by her grave when alone.

In 2016, Danielle's adoptive brother Gareth arrives in Walford, using the alias Andy Flynn (Jack Derges). He secretly plots revenge on Ronnie, as he believes that she caused Danielle's death. However, when Ronnie discovers his true identity, she tells him that he has not grieved for Danielle properly; he subsequently blames himself, saying he encouraged her to find Ronnie in the first place.

== Other appearances ==
The BBC used viral promotion on the EastEnders homepage to further develop the character of Danielle. A new section named Danielle's Diary was launched, encompassing events in the show from 6 October 2008 onwards, written in diary style from Danielle's point of view. Insight was given into the character's thoughts and feelings on the events surrounding her each week, beginning with the introduction: "Bit new to all this. Need some way to clear my head though. Can't really talk to Stace. Or Callum. Or anyone. Maybe if I write it all down, my head won't explode... Anyway, welcome to my life in Walford."

"Wow. As much as a loose cannon Roxy is... she has a way with words. She told me not to let Ronnie walk over me... "get in her face. It's what you'd do if you were a Mitchell!" I am a Mitchell! My blood boiled. She was right! Get in R's face. Tell her. Why should she get off lightly? Then I'll leave – I'LL REJECT HER, just like she rejected me. Tell that woman just what she's done to me! I ran to the Vic. I didn't care if I fell over... I just ran for my life. @ 22.05

— extract from Danielle's diary, 19 March 2009

In this manner, viewers were able to keep up with the character during her temporary absence from the show in February 2009, when she returned home to Telford following her abortion: "Back in Dawley. Feels strange to be away from Stacey... away from R&R... away from Ronnie. Been sleeping a lot – so tired. When I was younger I never dreamt that I'd go through all of this. Stace keeps ringing, but I can't speak to anyone. I can't even listen to my voicemail", and were privy to Danielle's internal worries about her relationship with Ronnie: "It's like I scare R. It was as though she scared herself, as she actually admitted that she cared. For about ten seconds I felt close to her again. Like watching the sun appear from behind a cloud... feeling the warmth across your skin again. But, then it disappears as another cloud sweeps over it." The final entry, dated minutes before Danielle's on-screen death, reads: "All I ever wanted was for mum to look at me with love in her eyes. To call me her baby. To tell me she loved me. I have to leave now. I have to go back to Telford. Goodbye Walford." After the character had been killed off, the diary format gave way to a wall of memorial messages, supposedly penned by other EastEnders characters, including Abi Branning (Lorna Fitzgerald), Lucy Beale (Melissa Suffield), Callum and Stacey.

== Reception ==
Miles Hosken, a former mayor of Telford, welcomed the choice to give Danielle a Telford background due to the national exposure it gave the area. Sarah Raper, chief executive of economic development company Transforming Telford, commented: "We hope the new character will portray Telford in a positive light and increase national awareness of the town". Councillor Eric Carter, Telford and Wrekin Council cabinet member for regeneration, added: "There are a lot of people working to put Telford on the map and this will help".

The Daily Mirror sympathised with Danielle over the storyline which saw her manipulated by Archie, deeming it one of the more interesting EastEnders plot strands. Gareth McLean of The Guardian's described Danielle as a "wet weekend incarnate", criticising the drawn out nature of the secret Mitchell storyline. Fellow Guardian critic Grace Dent was similarly critical of the storyline, particularly the scripting. The Daily Mirror's Tony Stewart wrote that "when a downcast Danielle walks into a room, it's like all the lights have been switched off", and his colleague Jane Simon christened the character "Drippy Danielle", writing that "If she's half Mitchell, her father must have been a marshmallow." Duncan Lindsay, writing for the Metro, described the effect of Danielle's death as "an uproar of the kind soaps rarely ever see". Angie Quinn of MyLondon deemed her death "tragic", and said she had been "doomed".

Discussing the character's death, Digital Spy's Kris Green praised Crace's acting. He compared Danielle's revelation that Ronnie was her mother to the EastEnders storyline several years previously, when Kat Slater (Jessie Wallace) revealed she was actually the mother of her supposed sister Zoe (Michelle Ryan). Green opined: "Although it didn't quite capture the magic of [the Kat-Zoe scene] it definitely comes an extremely close second." He concluded: "I'd probably go as far as to say that it's one of the best episodes EastEnders has produced in a long time". The episode was selected as recommended viewing by The Guardian's Sarah Dempster. Simon called it "the EastEnders episode of the year", though was again critical of Danielle, writing: "As a nation we've been driven mad by Danielle screwing up her forehead, shrugging her shoulders and walking around like a wide eyed simpleton. She isn't the first person in the world to track down their biological mother and while it's seldom easy, I can't imagine it's ever been quite so hard as Danielle has made it." Writing for The Times, Tim Teeman was critical of the length of time it took for the storyline to conclude, calling it "the most drawn-out 'reveal' in soapland". He deemed Ashdown's scripting of Danielle's exit to be "mad crescendo after mad crescendo", and the storyline as a whole "implausible", concluding that by the time Danielle died in Ronnie's arms: "EastEnders had hit the misery mother lode."

Crace was pleased with public reaction to the mother-daughter storyline, commenting prior to the reveal: "Everyone seems desperate to know why Danielle hasn't told Ronnie yet, so I'm taking that as a sign they're enjoying the story. Viewers are always telling me that they love it when Danielle and Ronnie have a scene together – I think they're on the edge of their seats, waiting to see when Danielle is finally going to admit the truth about her identity." Danielle's death received a mixed reaction from viewers. The decision was defended by Santer, who stated: "We acknowledge that we didn't deliver the happy ending that many of the audience may have been hoping for, and that for some people this was upsetting. We hope viewers understand that our aim is to deliver the best drama. That doesn't always lead to a happy ending. EastEnders – like all good drama – contains a balance of storylines, both happy and sad. We're proud of the episode, the storyline which built up to it and the way the audience have engaged with it." Following Danielle's final episode, regulator Ofcom confirmed they had received a number of complaints from the public about the "violent nature of the show and the horrific death at the end", and the fact it was broadcast before the 9 p.m. watershed.

Danielle's final episode was watched by an average of 11.46 million viewers, and attaining a 48.3% audience share. A further 1.2 million viewers watched the episode's repeat on BBC Three later that evening. The high ratings caused a power surge more than double the national average, seeing a grid surge of 1270MW compared to the 550MW usually experienced during EastEnders episodes. A National Grid spokeswoman commented that the surge was "equivalent to around half a million kettles being switched on at once."
