= Lauren Crace =

English actress (born 1986)

- Born: Lauren Rose Crace; 25 May 1986 (age 40); Birmingham, England
- Occupation: Actress
- Years active: 2008–present
- Spouse: Michael Stevenson (m. 2016)
- Children: 3

Lauren Rose Crace (born 25 May 1986) is an English actress and radio presenter, known for her portrayal of Danielle Jones in the BBC soap opera EastEnders from 2008 to 2009.

== Early life ==
The daughter of contemporary writer Jim Crace and Pamela Turton, Lauren Rose Crace was born in Birmingham. She has an older brother, Thomas, born 1981. She attended Swanshurst School in Billesley, and then Cadbury Sixth Form College, where she took both a GCSE and an A-Level in Drama. She joined the Stage 2 Youth theatre aged eleven. and later went on to train at Royal Academy of Dramatic Art, she graduated in 2008.

== Career ==
Crace began her acting career as an extra in television series. She also appeared in theatre productions, including leading roles in Alice in Wonderland and Sweeney Todd. In 2008, she joined the cast of the BBC soap opera EastEnders portraying the role of Danielle Jones. The viewing figures for Crace's last EastEnders episode peaked at 11.5 million; due to this, there was a surge in the national power grid. Crace won the award for Best Newcomer for her role in EastEnders at the TV Quick and TV Choice Awards.

In February 2010, Crace filmed a role in the BBC television series Sherlock, which broadcast later that year. From 29 April to 22 May 2010, Crace appeared at the Salisbury Playhouse as Cecile Volanges in Les Liaisons Dangereuses. From 2013 to 2015, Crace portrayed the recurring role of Doris Millar in ITV drama Mr Selfridge. In January 2018, Crace joined Free Radio as one of four presenters of its Birmingham breakfast show. Later that year, she appeared in two episodes of ITV drama Vanity Fair. She portrayed the role of Betsey Horrocks.

== Filmography ==
=== Film ===
Year	Title	Role	Notes
2005	My Parents Are Aliens	Tanya	Main role
2008–2009	EastEnders	Danielle Jones	Series regular; 77 episodes
2010	Sherlock	Lucy	1 episode
2011	Silk	Lindsey Moxham	1 episode
2011	Holby City	Rose	2 episodes
2012	Room at the Top	Joan	2 episodes
2012	Shameless	Beccy	1 episode
2013–2015	Mr Selfridge	Doris Millar	Recurring role
2016	Doctors	Gemma Bowcott	1 episode
2017	Casualty	Daisy Ashcroft	1 episode
2018	Vanity Fair	Betsey Horrocks	2 episodes
2019	Harry Hill's Alien Fun Capsule	Herself	Series 3: Episode 7
2020	Doctors	Mel Brinkshaw	Episode: "Fire Proof"
2021–2022	Casualty	Chrissie	2 Episodes

2023- Phoenix rise Ms Benson

=== Audio ===
Year	Title	Role
2011-2013	The Minister of Chance	Kitty

=== Stage ===
Year	Title	Role	Venue
2010	Les Liaisons Dangereuses	Cecile Volanges	Salisbury Playbouse
2011	And I And Silence	Young Dee	Finborough Theatre
2013	Theatre Uncut	Various	Young Vic
2014	Khandan	Liz	Royal Court Theatre
2015	Foundry Showcase	Various	Birmingham Repertory Theatre
